= Lakes in Bengaluru =

Lakes in Greater Bangalore as listed below. Reservoirs in light blue are greater than 100 acres. The smaller blue markers depict reservoirs less than 100 acres. Not exhaustive.

Lakes and tanks in the metropolitan area of Greater Bangalore and the district of Bangalore Urban are reservoirs of varying sizes constructed over a number of centuries by various empires and dynasties for rainwater harvesting. Historically, these reservoirs were primarily either irrigation tanks or for the water supply, with secondary uses such as bathing and washing. The need for creating and sustaining these man-made dammed freshwater reservoirs was created by the absence of a major river nearby coupled with a growing settlement. As Bangalore grew from a small settlement into a city, both of the primary historical uses of the tanks changed. Agricultural land witnessed urbanization and alternate sources of water were provisioned, such as through borewells, piped reservoir water and later river water from further away.

The topography of the three main gentle natural valley systems allowed for the creation of interconnected tanks and wetlands where water flows downstream through a series of channels or drains. These tank cascades or chains have seen accelerated change and fragmentation caused by urbanisation in the past four decades. Some lakes have been redefined as recreational spaces. Some have been built upon. Other lakes have reduced in size and are in various stages of deterioration. While associated pollution is rampant such as the case of Bellandur Lake which is used as a sewage tank, numerous public and private efforts have been undertaken to address sewage treatment, prevention of dumping and encroachment.

== Terminology ==
Lakes are called keregalu (ಕೆರೆಗಳು) in Kannada language, and are traditionally referred to as tanks. Researcher Rohan D'Souza has suggested that the concept of 'kere' and 'lake' differ; for example the former also refers to the wetland and bund while the latter focuses more on a body of water surrounded by land. When the forest department started to have a larger role in the administration of these waterbodies in the 1980s the word 'lake' started to be used as compared to 'kere' or 'tank'. In accordance with this terminology, communication and practices related to these waterbodies were impacted. Anthropologist Smriti Srinivas writes that tank is also a simplification that incorporates both natural and manmade waterbodies into its context since identification of bodies of water in the region that were historically natural is a task. A 1986 report classifies some tanks as 'disused' tanks.

There is no specific definition for what a lake is in India. Urban lakes also have no specific definition. In Bangalore, smaller waterbodies 1-3 acre in size are called gokattes and waterbodies less than 1 acre are called kuntes. The words kere and katte go back to usage by the Hoysala's. Kaluves can be translated as canals, while in the context of Bangalore rajakaluves refer to bigger or large canals, channels or drains, specifically storm water drains, that connect the lake cascades. Kalyanis refer to square tanks used for immersion (see temple tanks). Other bodies of water include a well, 'bhavi', and pond for domestic use, 'kola'.

== History ==
Rainwater has been stored in reservoirs or irrigation tanks in the Indian subcontinent for many centuries. In Bangalore and the surrounding regions of Mysore these tanks numbered in the thousands and varied in size according to the rains. They were made primarily for the purposes of irrigation and drinking water, and secondary uses such as fishing, washing and other domestic needs. Inscriptions provide some insight into their history. The history and creation of the reservoirs is linked to different empires, dynasties and periods of the British Raj. The Ganga and Chola dynasty, the Hoysala Empire, the Vijayanagara Empire, Hyder Ali and Tipu Sultan and the Wadiyar dynasty are all associated tanks in Bangalore, including their creation, maintenance and use. These tanks or lakes along with open water wells constituted the water supply infrastructure. Socio-economic factors, population distribution, caste, and wealth affected interaction with water bodies. The neerganti were organised labour traditionally associated with regulating irrigation water. Voddas were the tank builders. The traditional well diggers are the Manu Waddar. The Vanniyakula Kshtriya or Thigala were horticulturists associated with lakes such as Sampangi. They brought the Karaga celebration to Bangalore. The roles of these communities have been diluted over time. Cultural and religious associations abound. Urbanisation has had diverse but mixed influence on these communities. It is often the case that when the history of these tanks is discussed it is idealized.

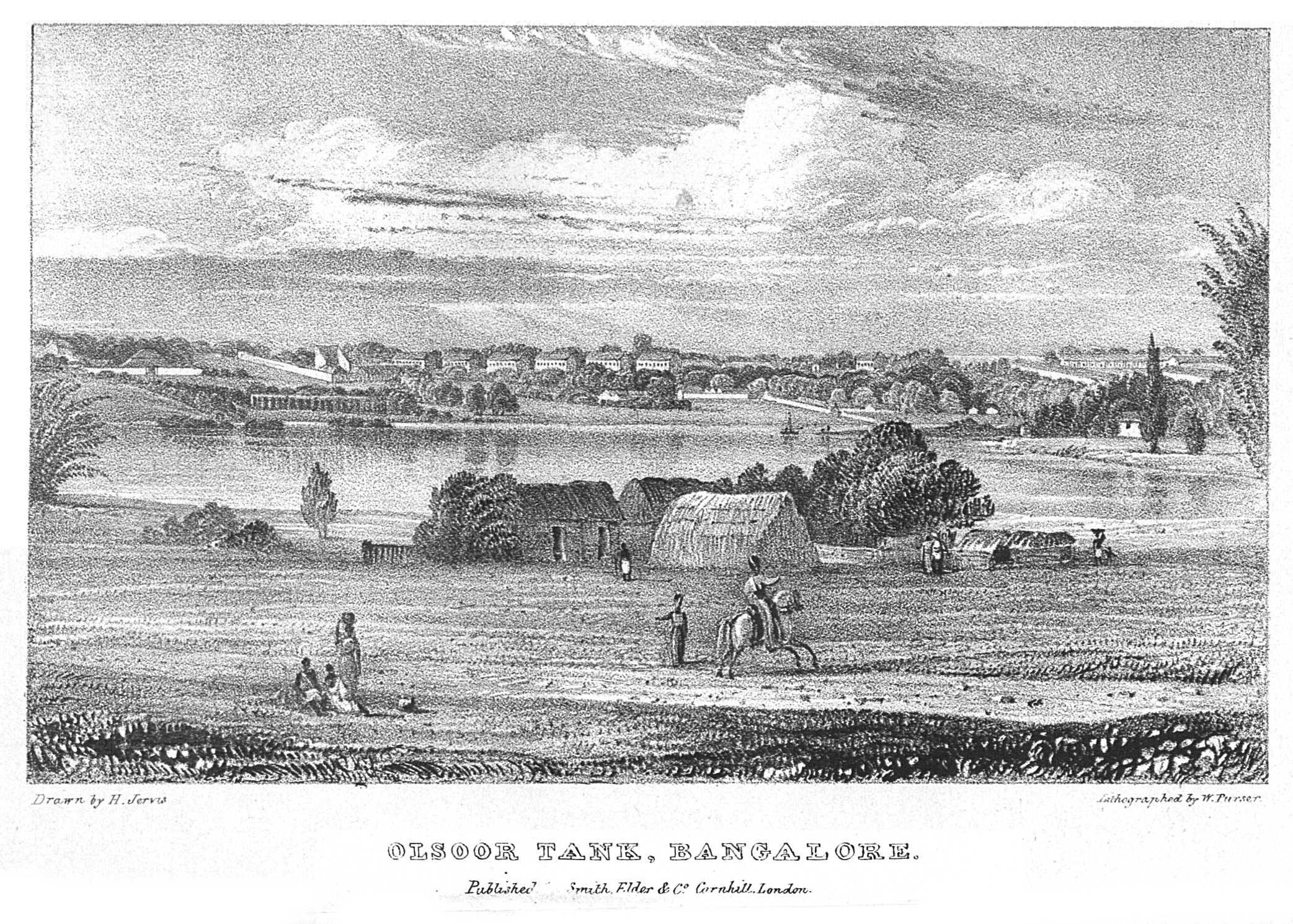
Ulsoor tank, 1834

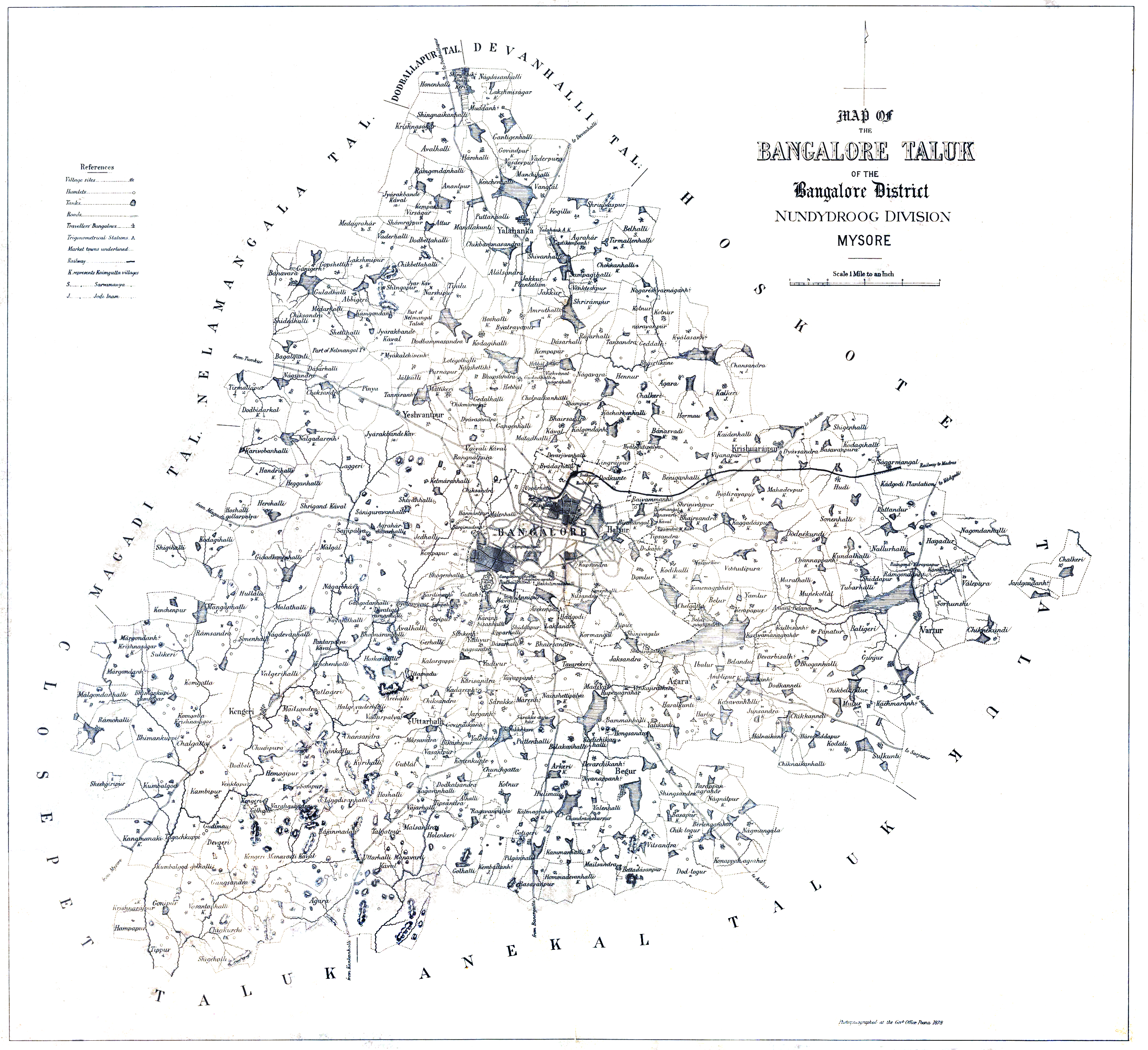
1878, Survey of India

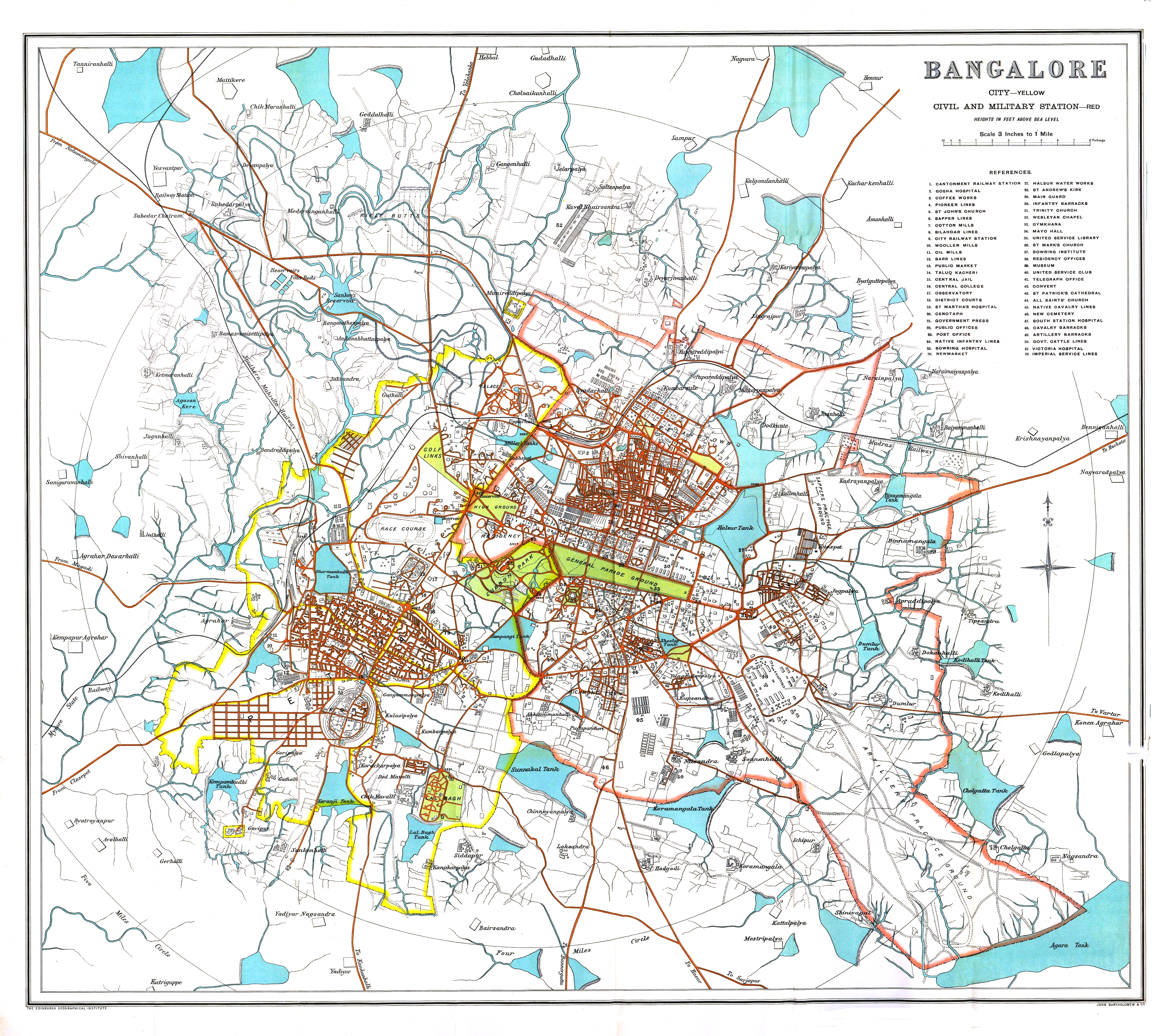
1900/1935, Bartholomew

View the georeferenced maps in the Wikimaps Warper

The dependence on tanks and other sources of water such as wells reduced with the implementation of schemes that brought water from Hesaraghatta Lake in 1894, T G Halli Reservoir in 1933, and Cauvery River from the 1970s. Borewells also reduced dependence on reservoirs. The Dharmambudhi Tank is used as an example to portray historical change, and change of a commons in Bangalore over the centuries. The tank goes back to at least the 16th century; some historical references point to a much earlier reservoir at the same location. The lake would be used until the end of the 19th century after which is saw unchecked decay as a waterbody. However its lakebed was located in prime area and continued to be used for various events, festivals, and gatherings. Part of the lakebed was still wetland and had wells. In the 1960s a portion of the lakebed was set aside for the construction of a bus stand. Of the many channels and lakes that were connected to Dharmabudhi in the past such as the former Sampangi Lake, Kempambudhi Lake and Sankey Tank remain.

Sampangi lake supported both the Pete and cantonment. It provided irrigation for millet and paddy cultivation. Construction in the area included a park in 1879, a hospital in 1886 and a school in 1898. Around 1895 the lake stopped being used officially as a water source and inflow channels severed. There were contesting claims as to how the lake and lakebed should be used. By 1935 all that remained was a small square tank. On the lakebed several constructions followed. An eponymously named stadium was constructed on a portion of Sampangi lake in 1946, now known as the Sree Kanteerava Stadium. This was followed by an increase in surrounding built up area. In 1995, another portion of the former wetland was used to build the Kanteerava Indoor Stadium.

Lakes or tanks, including dry ones, have been converted to commercial areas, industries, government buildings, bus stands, sports facilities, playgrounds and residential colonies, a few tanks were breached under a malaria eradication programme. When Bangalore Golf Course was formed in 1876, it was located in the center of the city, and then land was relatively easily obtained. In 1973 the Karnataka Golf Association was formed and the members started looking for a location to set up a golf course. Among the several locations Challaghatta lake or tank was suggested, then located on the outskirts of the city. At the time there were ample lakes in the city and not much fuss was made related to the lake itself. After a number of administrative processes involving multiple departments of the local administration and multiple Chief Ministers, and conversion of the area into a golf course designed by an Australian architectural firm, the first 9 holes were inaugurated in 1986. Multiple national and international golf tournaments have been held at the course.

In 1986 the Lakshman Rau committee (under a retired administrative officer; see N. Madhava Rao) came out with a report highlighting the failure to maintain various tanks and made comments covering lake boundaries, water quality, the construction of tree parks in areas breached, to monitoring and conducting further study for new tanks. The committee identified 127 lakes and transferred 90 to the forest department. Since the 1980s custody of the lakes in the city has seen numerous changes. The former Lake Development Authority experimented with public–private participation which included leasing out of four lakes. Government administration of the lakes in the city mainly fall under a few urban local and state regulatory bodies. Outside the city management is under the village and district Panchayats, and the Minor Irrigations department depending on the size of the lake. Others forms of participation in the form of corporate social responsibility, general public involvement, including coordination with government efforts, and formation of lake groups, has resulted in some lakes seeing successful attempts at conservation and rejuvenation. There are numerous measures undertaken, debated and contested by stakeholders in relation to the rejuvenation (restoration, revival, rehabilitation, conservation) of lakes. Failure of these processes has been observed. Urbanization has impacted the lakes in various ways, some lakes have completely disappeared, others have been reduced to pools, some have been encroached upon, some are in various stages of deterioration, some have dried up, and some have been leased. The Koliwad committee, set up by the Karnataka legislature in 2014, reported thousands of acres of encroachment of lake land.

== Topography and hydrology ==
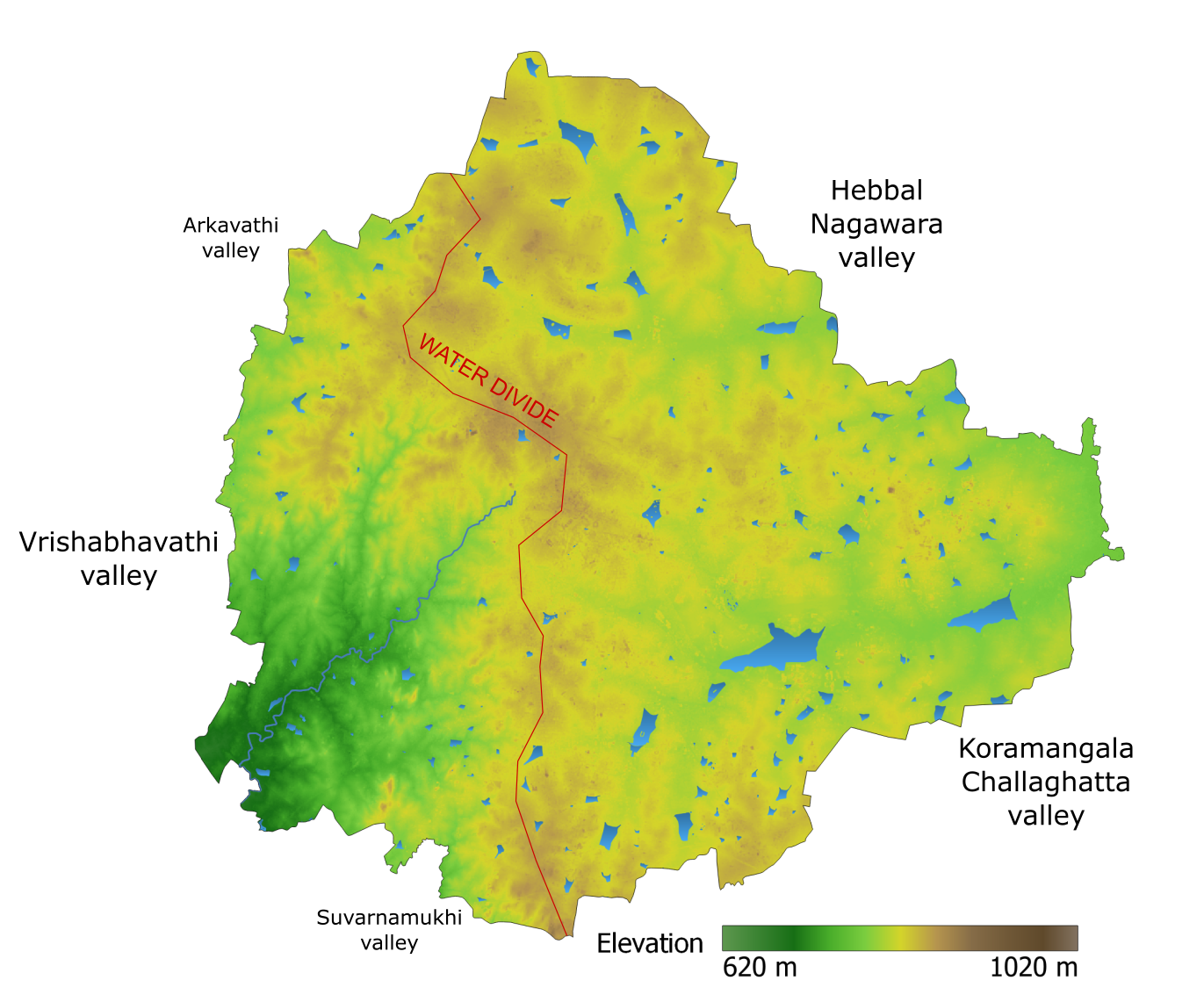

The topographic setting of the city has radial slopes towards east and west with a smooth ridge running north to south; rainfall over the ridge area gets divided and flows east or west into the three gentle slopes and valleys of Koramangala–Challagatta, Hebbal and Vrishabavathi. The average elevation is roughly 900 m (2,952.8 ft). These naturally undulating terrain of hills and valleys lends itself to the development of tanks that can capture and store rainwater. Small streams are formed by each valley starting with the ridge at the top. A series of shallow tanks varying in size are developed by the construction of bunds. A tank generally consists of a shallow inflow area and a relatively deeper outflow area where the bund is. The tank can further be zoned into a flooded area and a waterlogged zone. Monsoons recharge the tanks and the outflow can be regulated for irrigation of monsoon crops during the last six months of the year. Most tanks are dry a couple of months before the onset of the new monsoon. A second crop can be considered on the basis of water levels. Other seasonal changes affect the water level. Urban sewage inflow allows some lakes to retain their water spread for a longer period. Initially serving as a water source, these tanks over time also developed features of closed water lentic ecosystem habitats. The catchments on the east and west of the ridge belong to the Ponnaiyar River and Arkavathi River respectively. Both these rivers flow into the Kaveri.

The tank-canal linkages or rajakaluves (large canals or stormwater canals) were redefined by the colonial administration once they became the location for the sewerage network. Rajakaluves now refer to both the inter-lake linkages and the sewerage, and are translated as stormwater drains. In the 21st century there are 842 km in the drain network. Urbanisation has impacted these. Ensuring adequate water flow and no blockages is undertaken by the local administration. Encroachment of storm drains and catchment areas can cause both drying up and flooding of lakes. These drains often carry sewage in it, which results in the lakes getting polluted.

Bangalore has a mean annual rainfall of 859.6 mm (2.8 ft) with June to September seeing the majority of rainfall. 2022 was the wettest year with over 1700mm of rainfall. The city sees around 60 rainy days a year. The minimum rainfall is 587.8 mm/year. An estimate of the rain water potential is 45000 million litres. The annual mean temperature is 24 °C (75.2 °F) with extremes ranging from 37 °C (98.6 °F) to 15 °C (59.0 °F). The highest and lowest temperature ever recorded in Bangalore has been 38.9 °C and 7.8 °C. in 1931 and 1884 respectively.

=== Quantity ===
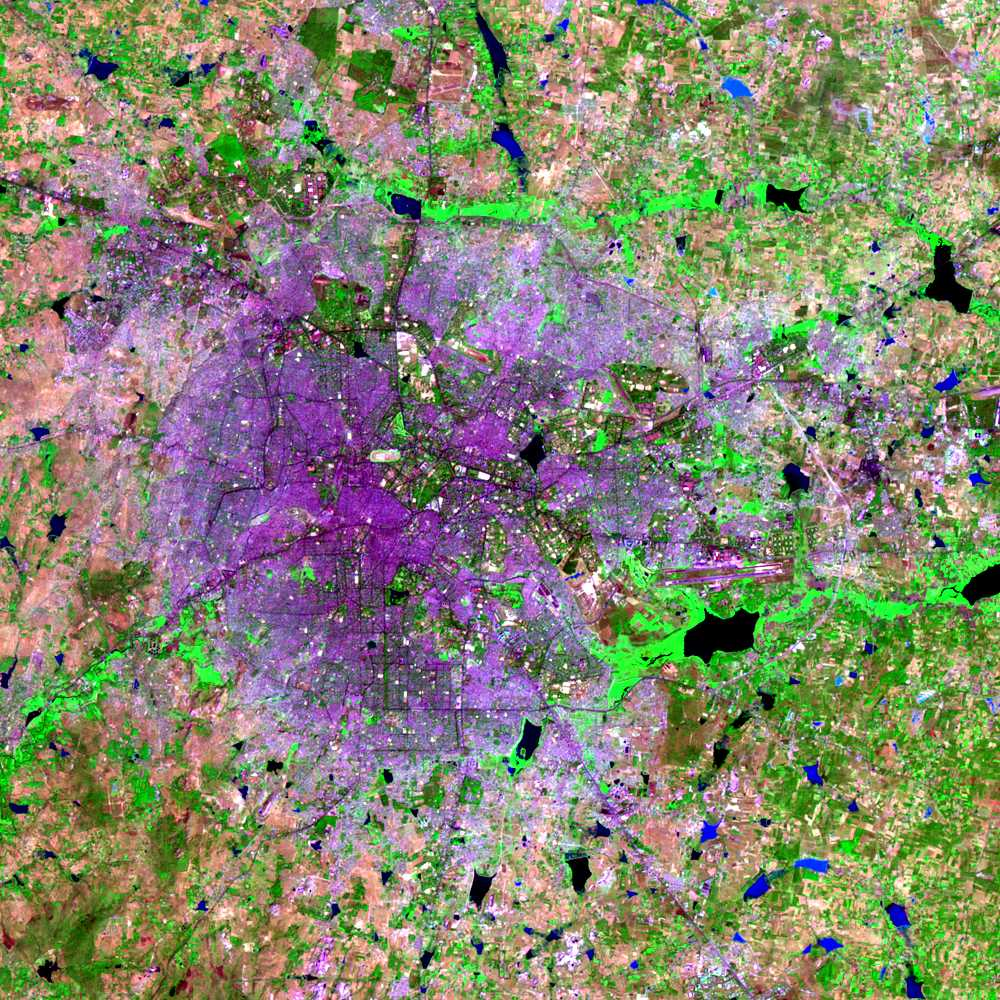
A 2006 false colour image

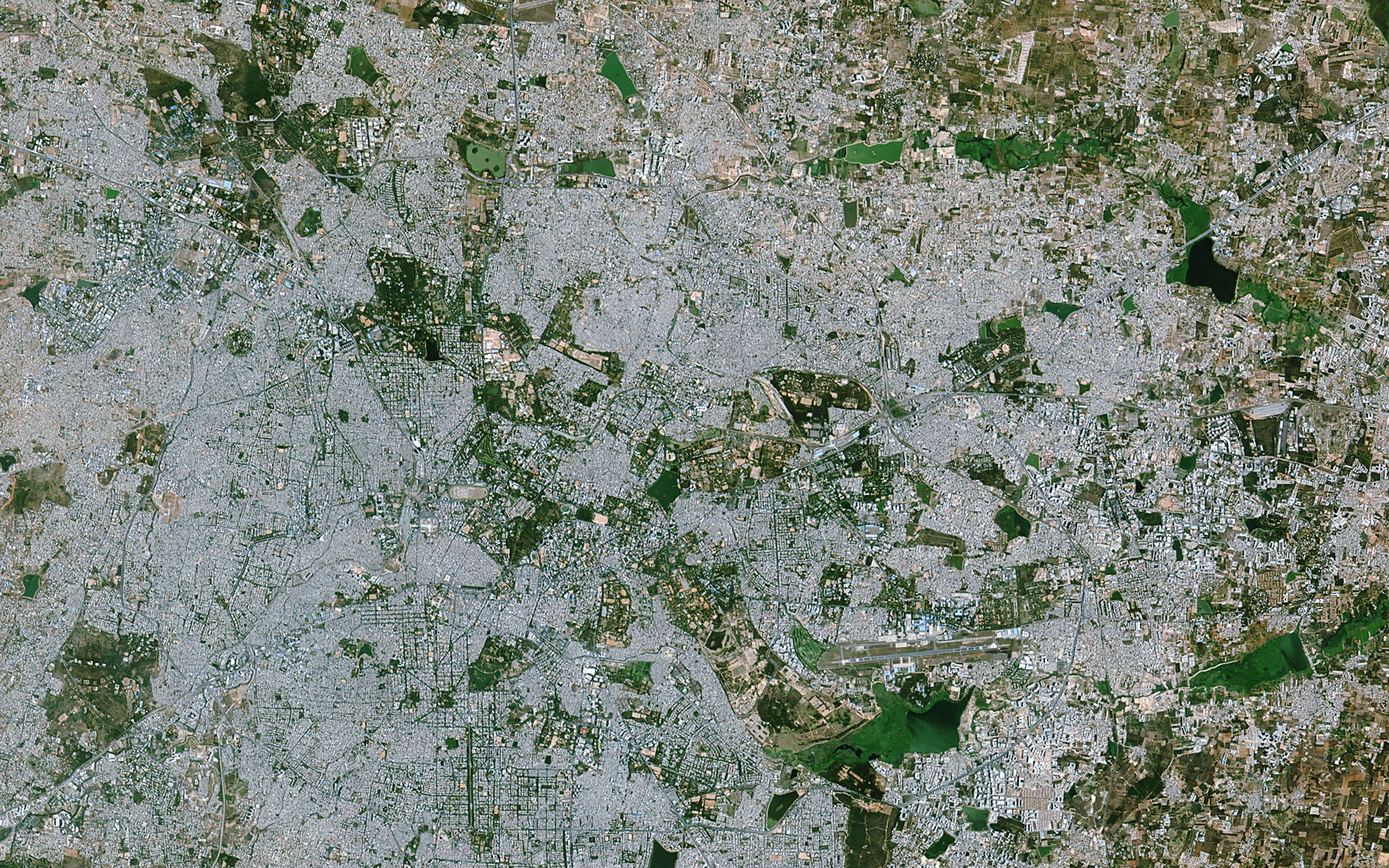
Bangalore city in 2018

There are various boundaries and methods that have been considered when counting lakes or tanks. This includes the different jurisdictions of concerned government bodies such as BBMP, BDA, BMRDA; the different limits of Bangalore Metropolitan Area, Greater Bangalore, Bangalore Rural district, Bangalore Urban district; and counts mentioned in reports such as the N Lakshman Rao report of 1986. Over time, the expansion of the limits of the city has resulted in a transfer of lakes in the rural district to the urban district.

Bangalore has grown in area from 69 km^{2} (17,000 acres) in 1949 to over 700 km^{2} (170,000 acres) by 2007. The area covered by water bodies in Greater Bangalore and Bangalore Urban has seen a sharp decline since the 1960s and 1970s. Greater Bangalore has seen a reduction in water cover from 20.8 km^{2} in 1965 to 12.5 km^{2} in 2018. A study published in 2008 found that in the heart of the city only 17 good lakes exist as against 51 healthy lakes in 1985. A 2020 report listed 211 lakes within BBMP boundary limits. There are six cascading lake series- Varthur, Puttenahalli, Hulimavu, Byramangala, Yellamallappa Chetty and Madavara.

In 2015, a survey of all lakes in Bangalore Urban totaling 834 was completed. BMRDA in 2001 identified 2789 lakes (2-50 hectares in size) within its limits. In 2013, the jurisdiction of the minor irrigation department, BMRDA and BDA was 3578, 2789 and 596 tanks/lakes respectively. The Koliwad committee (2014-2016) listed 1545 lakes. A 2018 study by an autonomous institute under the Karnataka government counted 1521 water bodies in the Bangalore Metropolitan Area, out of which 837 were disused.

=== Quality ===
The largest lake in the city Bellandur Lake is "severely polluted". The lake receives 520 million litres per day of sewage and other waste that amounts to about 40% of the city's total. Out of this roughly half is treated and diverted for irrigation. Otherwise the only inflow is rainwater. When aquatic systems around the world are taken into consideration, Bellandur Lake has methane emissions that are among the highest in the world. The lake has been in the news for its pollution, froth, and fire. Post-2015 deliberations with regard to what the end-goal of a rejuvenation of Bellandur lake would entail were held. The cause of the water quality situation in the lake was discussed. No simple solutions were found. Heavy metal contamination in Bellandur Lake impacts concentration of heavy metals in the soil and crop in areas irrigated using untreated lake water. Despite the numerous shortcomings presented by Bellandur and downstream Varthur lakes, these aren't representative of the many more shortcomings of water management in the rest of Bangalore. Byramangala Lake has also seen froth. A number of factors impact measurements and interpretation of water quality and pollution.

India's National Water Quality Monitoring Programme is implemented in Bangalore by the Karnataka State Pollution Control Board through a network of over 100 monitoring stations located at lakes and tanks. Monthly monitoring data is classified under pre-defined water quality criteria A-E. In 2022, according to this data water in all the lakes in Bangalore were undrinkable with no lake falling under categories A-C.

Water hyacinth, and other macrophytes and phytoplankton, are bioindicators of certain characteristics of water quality. Using satellite imagery between 1988 and 2019 (see #Ecology) significant areas of these have been observed covering various lakes in Bangalore, varying in coverage of the wetland according to lake, season and other factors. There have been occurrences of mass fish mortality. Immersion of Ganesha idols that are made with specific types of material has impacted water quality. Some types of painted idol immersion has had significant effects on aquatic life. Over 150,000 idols were submerged in 2022. Measures to minimize pollution during the festival include use of earthen idols and smaller disconnected artificial tanks.

Sewage treatment plants near lakes. Constructed wetlands.

Integrated wetlands, constructed wetlands, and floating wetlands have been utilized to improve water quality. The integrated wetland of Jakkur Lake consists of partially treating sewage inflow before entry into a constructed wetland adjacent to the main lake body. A 10 MLD treatment plant utilizes UASB technology and extended aeration. This is followed by a constructed wetland spread over about 11 acres consisting of shallow followed by deeper settling basins with a variety of aquatic plants. The constructed wetland at Agara Lake is spread over 9 acres. Floating wetlands have been used at multiple lakes with varying success, notably Hebbagodi Lake. Some lakes have wastewater treatment plants with direct inflow into the main lake area.

Urban flooding has been considered as a disaster by National Disaster Management Authority following major flooding events in cities in India in the 2000s including Bangalore. While there are similarities between cities in the causes of the floods, Bangalore has some unique exacerbating features with regard to its lake ecosystem.

== Ecology ==
=== Birds ===
The Birdwatchers' Field Club of Bangalore released their first list of birds in Bangalore in the 1970s. The revised list of 1994 also contains recorded sightings such as that of little grebe at Ulsoor tank in 1930 and data from the waterfowl census conducted since 1987. The 1994 list records over 220 regularly sighted birds. 109 birds are wetland birds and additional 30 species are favoured by the presence of water. A study conducted by the same group in 1989 observed economic activities in and around the tanks which affected their ecology. Out of 97 tanks that were observed in a radius of 30 km, unregulated mudlifting and brickmaking were practiced in a large number of the lakes. Micro-habitats for aquatic birds in Bangalore can be grouped into roughly five categories: open water birds, waders and shoreline birds, meadow and grassland birds, birds of reedbeds and other vegetation, birds of open airspace above wetlands. Some birds frequent multiple micro-habitats. The ninth and tenth edition of the census of wetland and water birds in 1995 and 1996 conducted by the Birdwatchers' Field Club in coordination with the state forest department found 29 lakes which had twenty or more species such as Hebbal, Hosakote and Kalkere. 25 lakes were found with over 500 birds. The pond heron was found to be the most prevalent species among all the lakes, however no one species was present in all the lakes. Common waders include egret, sandpiper and brahminy kite. Kingfisher was the most common open water bird. The most common duck was Garganey. Pintail and Coot were common reed and other vegetation birds.

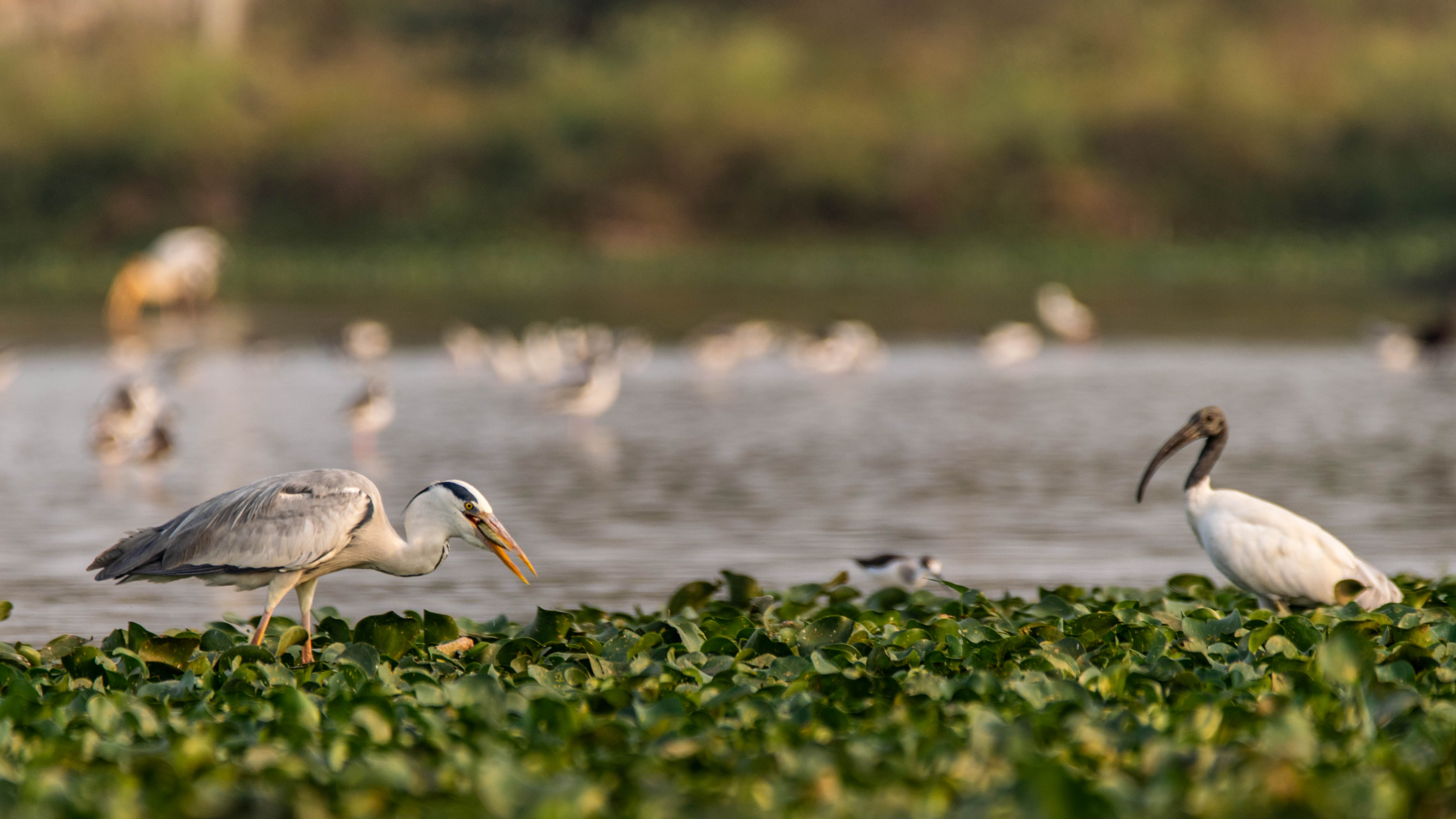
Hosakote lake

A study using eBird data from 2014 to 2019 from 44 lakes in the city had a sample size that included a total of 263 species. In this study, the area of the lake and its position in the city impacted bird richness. Most resident species saw an increase while most migratory species decreased. An earlier study of 15 lakes in the city identified birds such as kingfishers, purple moorhen, little grebes, darter, purple heron, grey herons and pond herons. A 2005-2007 study observed 112 bird species at seven lakes; Hebbal Lake had 74 species while Yediur Lake had 15 species. Another localised study of aquatic birds found that two of the most abundant species are Anas querquedula, a species of duck, and Bubulcus ibis, a species of heron. Bird poaching and hunting was rampant in 1989. It now occurs to a much lesser extent.

=== Fish ===
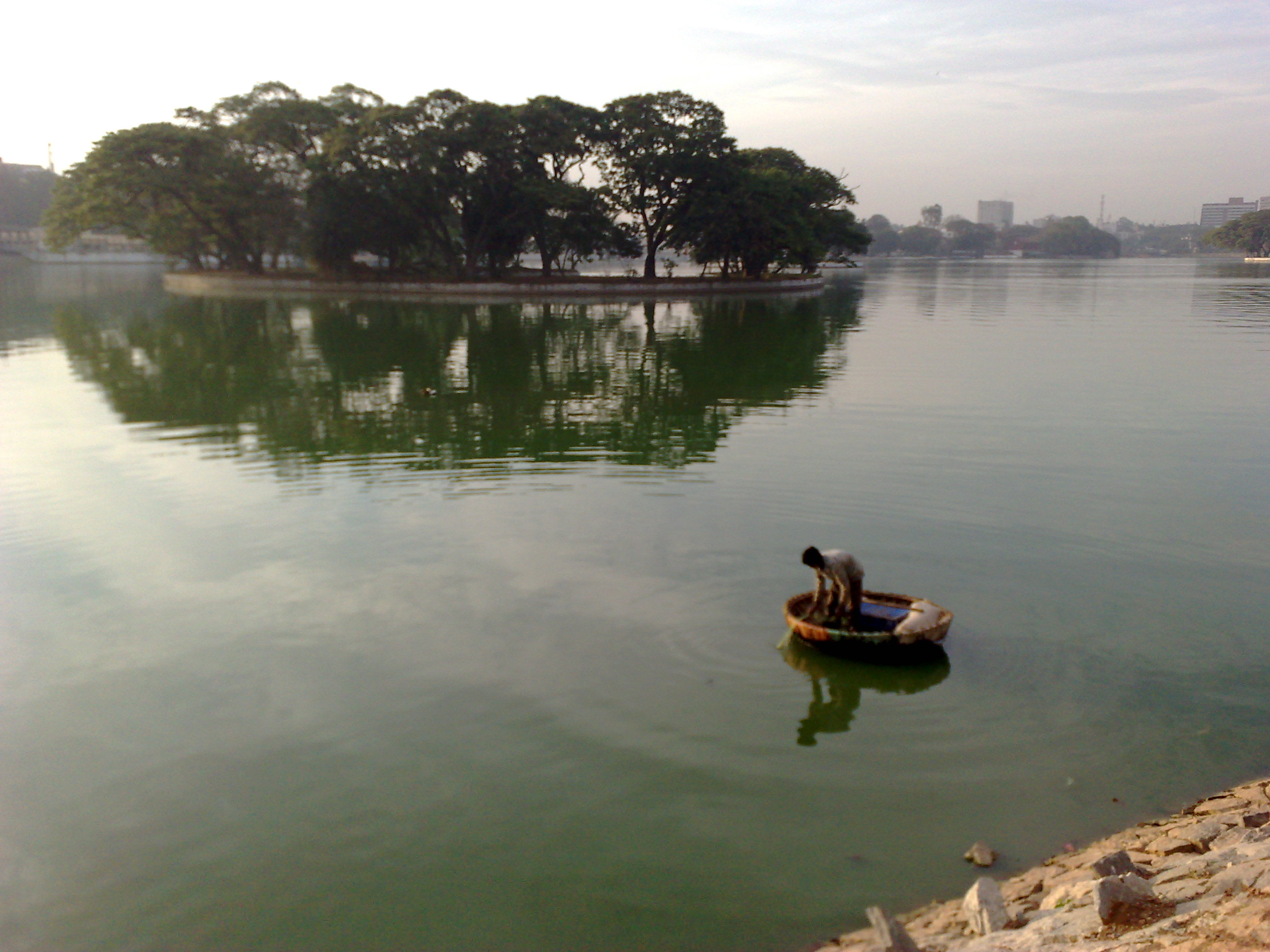
Ulsoor lake, fishing using a coracle and gillnet

20 types of fish have been observed in the lakes. Cyprinidae family is dominant. Fish diversity and bird biodiversity are impacted by fishing practices. Appropriate water bodies are leased out for fishing purposes. Fishes bred for food include carps such as catla, labeo, mrigal, and other types such as tilapia, catfish. Labeo rohita or rohu is the most commonly bred fish. In 2021 Jakkur Lake supported a number of fishing families. The lake provides up to 200 kg of fish per day. The catch can go up to 500 kg. There is a fish farm and research center beside Hebbal Lake.

=== Macrophytes ===
Imagery from the Indian Remote Sensing Programme for the years 1988-2001 were used to assess growth of water hyacinth in six lakes in Bangalore. Among the largest areas in this study under water hyacinth was observed in Hebbal Lake at 20 ha (49 acres) out of a total water spread of 30 ha (74 acres). Nagavara Lake had the highest ratio of water hyacinth to water spread; in March 1989 the lake was completely covered. In the mid-1980s Neochetina eichhorniae, used in the biocontrol of water hyacinth, was released on an experimental basis in a specific area of Bellandur Lake. An impact on water hyacinth was observed. The insect had also been recorded in the coming months in downstream Varthur Lake signifying a capability to migrate. Within a few months infestation of all water hyacinth in Varthur Lake was observed.

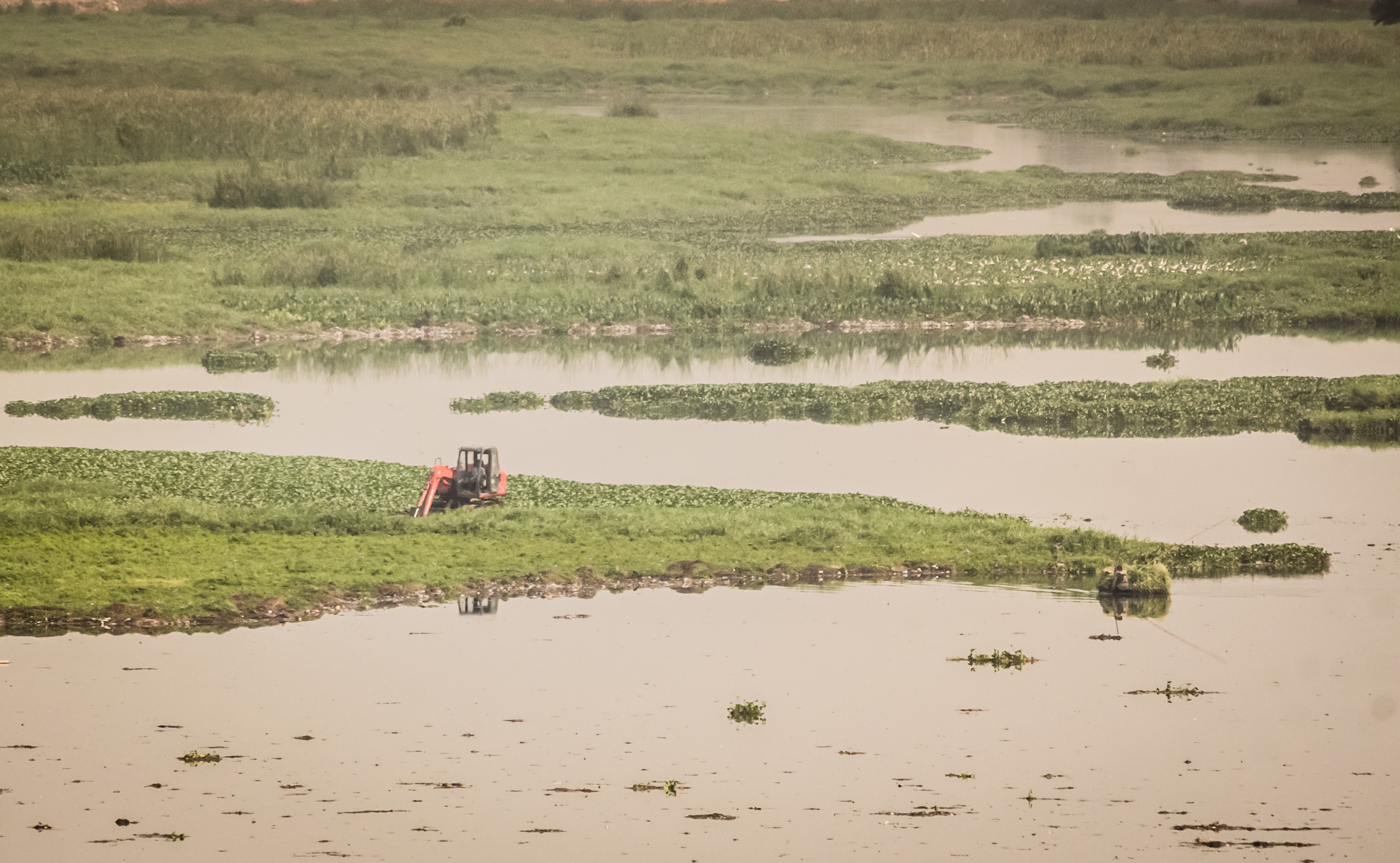
Bellandur lake

Analysis of freely available Google Earth imagery between 2002 and 2019 for macrophytes and phytoplankton cover in Bellandur and Varthur lakes showed that macrophyte cover never fell below 29% of the total wetland cover with a perennial average of nearly 60%. Algae was about half that of the macrophyte cover. Water hyacinth has favoured types of moorhen, heron, and egret, and has caused the loss of a type of wader. Aquatic weed harvesters are used on Bellandur lake.

Common emergent aquatic plants include alligator weed, pink morning glory and cattail. Common submerged aquatic plants include those from the genus Aponogeton, Potamogeton and the highly invasive Hydrilla, Elodea. Free floating Lemna, Wolffia and Eichhornia are common. Rooted floating plants include weeds, lilies and lotus. Around 22 types of aquatic weeds are found in the lakes including algae, duckweed, water hyacinth, musk grass, water thyme, pondweed.

=== Plankton ===
The 1989 Birdwatchers' Field Club study recorded 113 forms of plankton; in terms of plankton diversity six out of the 72 lakes showed high diversity. In a doctoral study on algae from 2017 to 2019 one downstream and one upstream lake from each of the 6 lake series were targeted. Algal diversity observed included 124 species belonging to 58 genera of the four classes Chlorophyceae, Cyanophyceae, Bacillariophyceae and Euglenophyceae. Dominant taxa includes the species Scenedesmus dimorphus and species from the genus Anabaena. In a targeted study of 7 lakes between 2010 and 2012 the dominant classes were the same. Microcystis aeruginosa was the most dominant algal bloom. The main zooplankton were rotifera, cladocera, ostracoda and copepoda.

=== Other ===
An inventory of lakes in Bangalore conducted between 2016 and 2018 identified 142 types of flora 191 types of fauna, belonging to nine categories of the biota (flora: trees, herbs and shrubs, aquatic flora; fauna: insects, macro benthic fauna, fish, herpetofauna, avifauna, mammals) in and around the water bodies.

Various trees, herbs and shrubs are found in and around the lakes. Aacia nilotica has been planted at various tanks. Floral diversity of wetlands include types of flowering and fruiting plants.

A 2016 study identified 116 butterfly species. Doddakallasandra lake and Madivala lake have seen efforts specific to butterfly biodiversity. Apharitis lilacinus has been spotted at Hesaraghatta Lake.

One of the, or the, most vital modern use of lakes is for the storage of freshwater and subsequent recharge of groundwater in Bangalore. This comes into question during efforts to enhance the biodiversity and aesthetics of the lakes through the creation of artificial islands and tree parks, and opposition to "soup bowl" structured restoration. Naturalist Zafar Futehally suggests a balance by restricting soup bowl structure to select lakes, and allowing the others to develop with more concern for aquatic birds and recreation. In 2023 The New York Times reported about conservationist Anand Malligavad who has restored 35 lakes in Bengaluru, with the help ancient Chola methods of water management, which don't need maintenance.

== List of lakes and tanks ==
=== Greater Bangalore ===
==== Larger than 100 acres ====
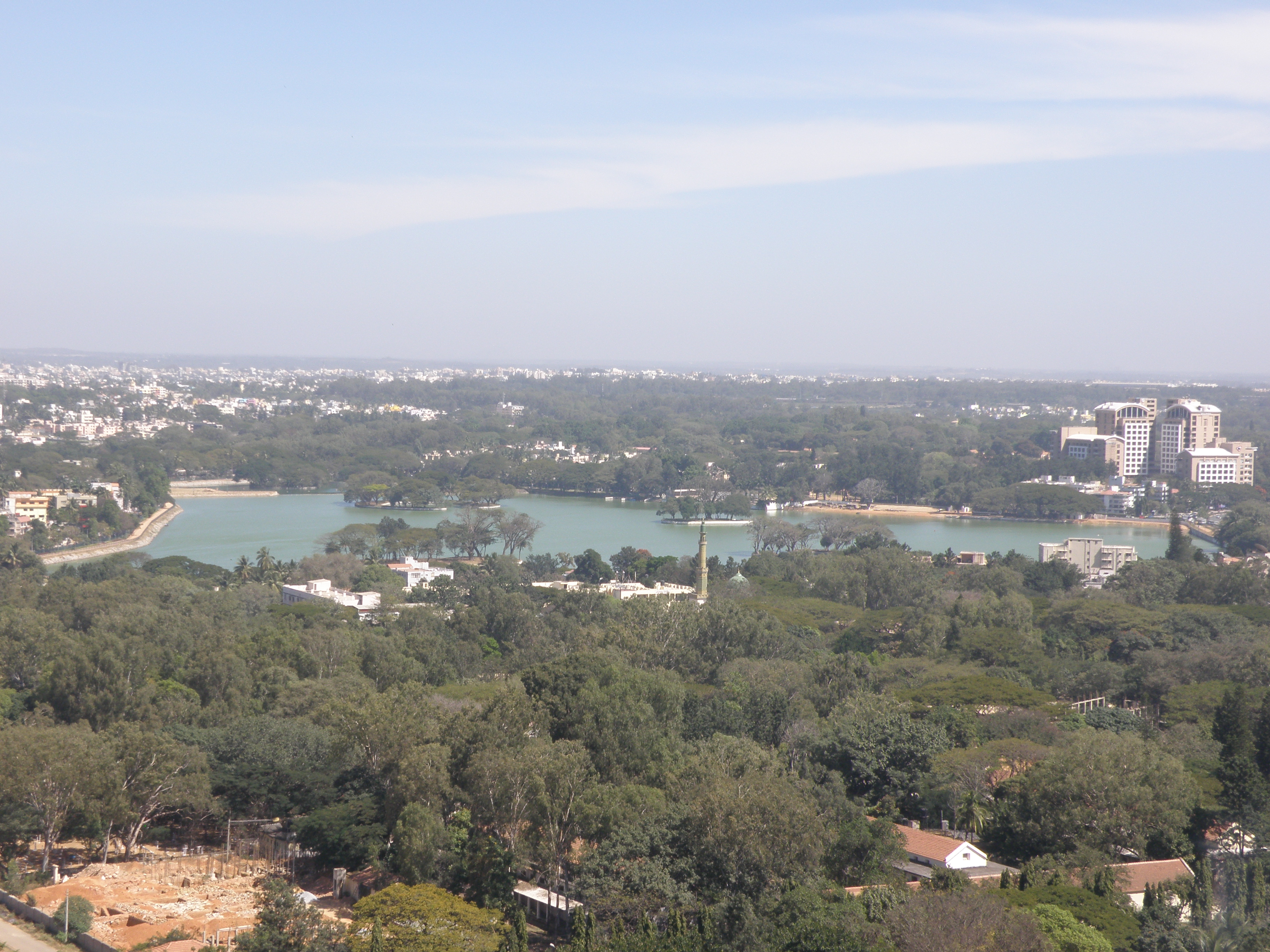
Ulsoor Lake

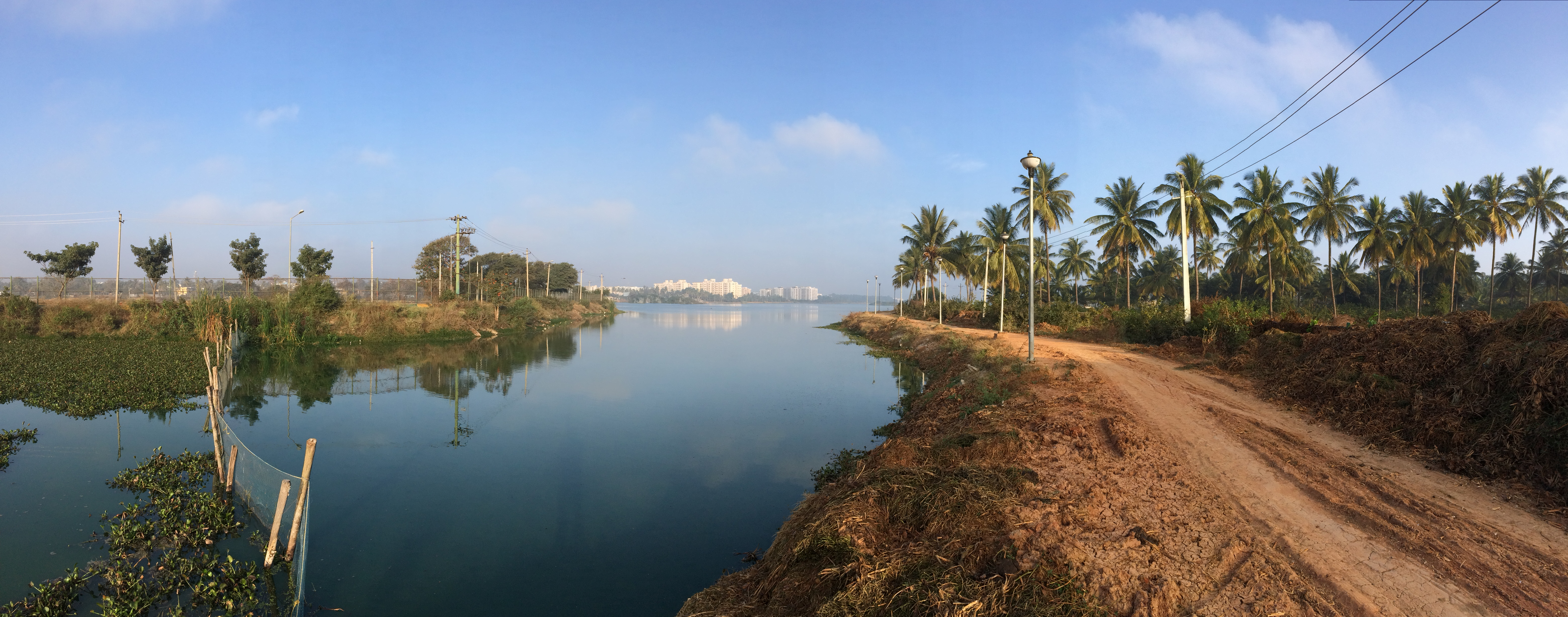
Jakkur Lake

Count	Name	Area (acres)	Coordinates
1	Begur	137	12.8754°N 77.6298°E
2	Bellandur	892	12.9347°N 77.6640°E
3	Chikkabanavara	170	13.0825°N 77.5068°E
4	Doddabommasandra	124	13.0650°N 77.5619°E
5	Doddanekundi	130	12.9750°N 77.6875°E
6	Hebbal	150	13.0469°N 77.5858°E
7	Hulimavu	127	12.8716°N 77.6036°E
8	Jakkur	157	13.0867°N 77.6101°E
9	Kalkere Lake	187	13.0473°N 77.6642°E
10	Madiwala	268	12.9069°N 77.6161°E
11	Maragondanahalli (Note: Also called Huvinane, Rampura-Kalkere)	187	13.0477°N 77.6841°E
12	Rachenahalli	104	13.0626°N 77.6134°E
13	Ulsoor	108	12.9825°N 77.6191°E
14	Varthur	445	12.9487°N 77.7392°E
15	Yelahanka	288	13.1108°N 77.5952°E
16	Yele Mallappa Shetty	490	13.0246°N 77.7274°E

==== 6 to 100 acres ====
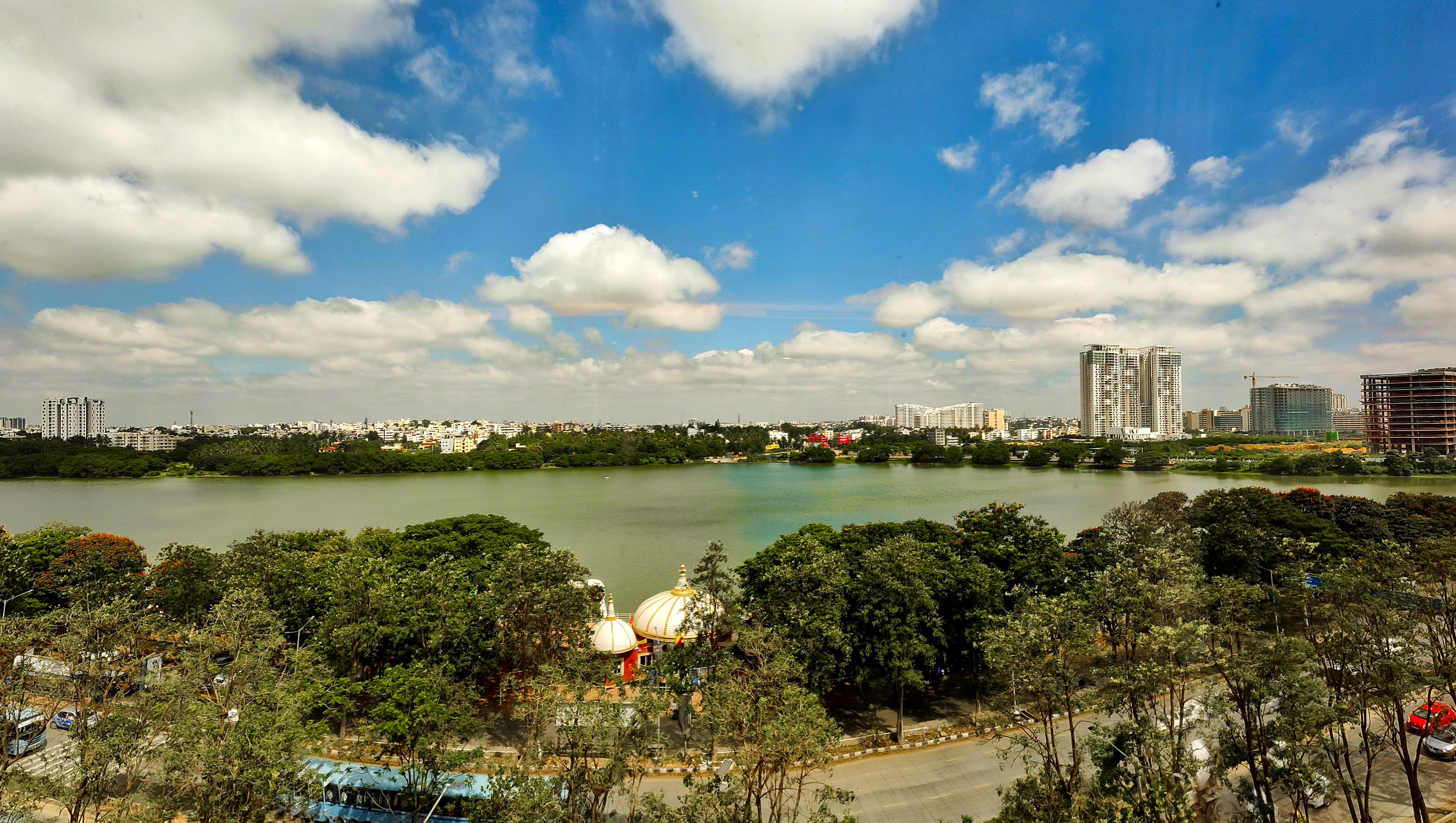
Nagavara Lake

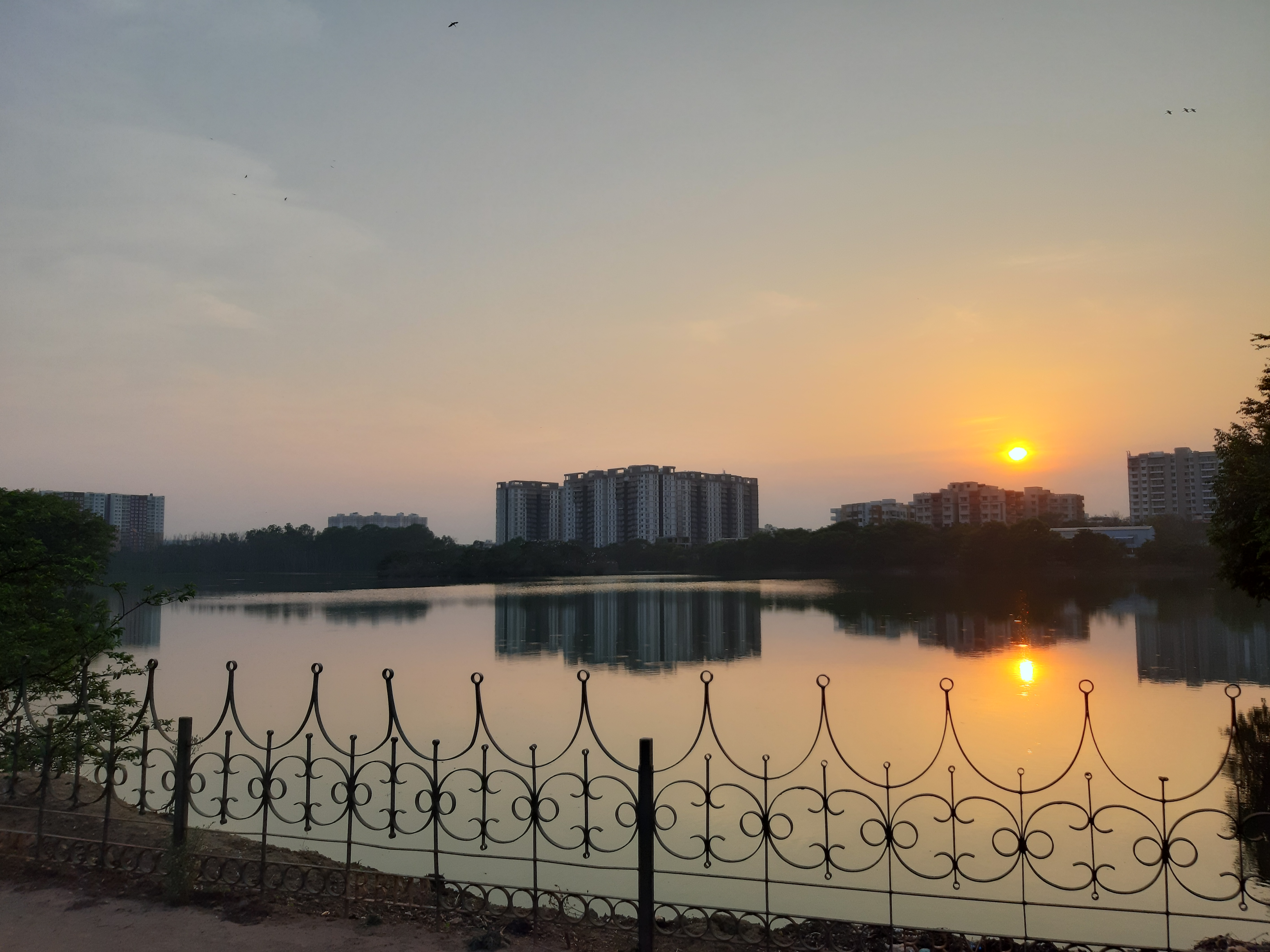
Kaikondrahalli Lake

Count	Name	Area (acres)	Coordinates
1	Abbigere	47	13.0793°N 77.5278°E
2	Agara	97	12.9212°N 77.6412°E
3	Akshayanagara	6	12.8716°N 77.6140°E
4	Allalasandra	35	13.0910°N 77.5871°E
5	Amrutahalli	23	13.0617°N 77.5977°E
6	Anchepalya	56	13.0515°N 77.4793°E
7	Are	29	12.8831°N 77.5986°E
8	Attur	81	13.1114°N 77.5629°E
9	Avalahalli	21	12.8651°N 77.5661°E
10	Bagmane	11	12.9792°N 77.6554°E
11	Banaswadi (Note: Has lost its former characteristics)	25	13.0128°N 77.6448°E
12	Benniganahalli	15	12.9974°N 77.6651°E
13	Byrasandra	14	12.9302°N 77.5958°E
14	Chele	25	13.0265°N 77.6446°E
15	Chinnappanahalli	11	12.9658°N 77.7068°E
16	Chunchanghatta	18	12.9658°N 77.7068°E
17	Dasarahalli	27	13.0409°N 77.5118°E
18	Devara	7	12.8977°N 77.5543°E
19	Devasandra	16	13.0049°N 77.6935°E
20	Doddabidarakallu	40	13.0431°N 77.4954°E
21	Doddakallasandra	21	12.8821°N 77.5615°E
22	Dore	28	12.9027°N 77.5504°E
23	Dubasipalya	22	12.9311°N 77.4945°E
24	Gangondanahalli	20	13.0179°N 77.4747°E
25	Garvebhavipalya	18	12.8964°N 77.6372°E
26	Gottigere	37	12.8530°N 77.5901°E
27	Halagevaderahalli	9	12.9240°N 77.5149°E
28	Haralur	27	12.8964°N 77.6624°E
29	Herohalli	25	12.9891°N 77.4896°E
30	Hoodi	15	12.9868°N 77.7227°E
31	Hormavu Agara	51	13.0355°N 77.6584°E
32	Hosa	38	12.8846°N 77.6649°E
33	Hosakerehalli	59	12.9262°N 77.5337°E
34	Hoskere	54	12.9259°N 77.4804°E
35	Iblur	10	12.9224°N 77.6668°E
36	Janardhana	7	12.8909°N 77.5568°E
37	Kacharkanahalli	53	13.0183°N 77.6263°E
38	Kaggadasapura	47	12.9819°N 77.6695°E
39	Kaikondrahalli	48	12.9133°N 77.6729°E
40	Kalena Agrahara	7	12.8655°N 77.5896°E
41	Kannuru	64	13.0999°N 77.6507°E
42	Kasavanahalli	53	12.9040°N 77.6665°E
43	Kelagina	12	12.9787°N 77.6618°E
44	Kempambudhi	36	12.9518°N 77.5593°E
45	Kengeri	38	12.9163°N 77.4874°E
46	Kogilu	73	13.1080°N 77.6189°E
47	Konasandra	37	12.8923°N 77.4834°E
48	Kothanur	18	12.8739°N 77.5789°E
49	Kowdenahalli	55	13.0125°N 77.6850°E
50	K R Puram	45	13.0165°N 77.6984°E
51	Kundalahalli	30	12.9693°N 77.7203°E
52	Lalbagh	40	12.9460°N 77.5826°E
53	Lakkasandra		12.9439°N 77.6007°E
54	Malathalli	72	12.9656°N 77.4946°E
55	Mathikere	80	13.0354°N 77.5508°E
56	Mahadevpura	26	12.9873°N 77.6921°E
57	Mestripalya	9	12.9322°N 77.6259°E
58	Munnekolala	15	12.9608°N 77.7080°E
59	Mylasandra	12	12.9082°N 77.4926°E
60	Nagavara	75	13.0449°N 77.6080°E
61	Narasappanahalli	37	13.0216°N 77.4950°E
62	Nayandahalli	15	12.9400°N 77.5213°E
63	Pattandur Agrahara	12	12.9760°N 77.7452°E
64	Puttenahalli Lake, Yelahanka	34	13.1113°N 77.5764°E
65	Puttenahalli Lake, J P Nagar	13	12.8903°N 77.5871°E
66	Sadaramangala	52	12.9995°N 77.7285°E
67	Sankey tank	40	13.0096°N 77.5738°E
68	Sarakki	82	12.8993°N 77.5792°E
69	Saul	61	12.9179°N 77.6796°E
70	Seegehalli	31	13.0172°N 77.7128°E
71	Seetharampalya	23	12.9819°N 77.7129°E
72	Singapura	66	13.0825°N 77.5351°E
73	Subramanyapura	18	12.8962°N 77.5427°E
74	Sunkalpalya	15	12.9064°N 77.4960°E
75	Talaghattapura	19	12.8664°N 77.5315°E
76	Thirumenahalli	7	13.0927°N 77.6284°E
77	Thubarahalli	27	12.9585°N 77.7246°E
78	Ullal	31	12.9611°N 77.4805°E
79	Uttarahalli	16	12.9081°N 77.5413°E
80	Vibhutipura	40	12.9680°N 77.6758°E
81	Yediyur	18	12.9336°N 77.5764°E

==== Former reservoirs ====
Former reservoirs. Not exhaustive.

Name	Detail	Coordinates	Refs
Akkithimmanahalli	sports stadium, Bangalore Hockey Stadium	12.9617°N 77.6004°E	
Challaghatta	Golfing	12.9522°N 77.6454°E	
Dasarahalli	sports complex, Dr. B.R. Ambedkar Stadium	12.9840°N 77.5437°E	
Dharmambudhi	Majestic bus stand	12.9779°N 77.5721°E	
Domlur	The Energy and Resource Institute (TERI), BDA layout	12.9637°N 77.6353°E	
Jakkarayana	sports ground	12.9867°N 77.5709°E	
Jaraganahalli*		12.9018°N 77.5720°E	
Kadugondanahalli	Ambedkar Medical College	13.0247°N 77.6136°E	
Kamakshipalya	sports ground	12.9843°N 77.5294°E	
Karanji	Gandhi Bazar area	12.9456°N 77.5693°E	
Konena Agrahara	multiple buildings	12.9578°N 77.6604°E	
Koramangala	multiple buildings, residential, National Dairy Research Institute	12.9492°N 77.6153°E	
Millers	multiple buildings, hospitals, IT companies, schools, residential buildings	12.9904°N 77.5962°E	
Nagashettihalli	multiple buildings, space department, residential	13.0346°N 77.5701°E	
Parangipalya	Kaggadasapura Lake	12.9092°N 77.6424°E	
Puttennahalli	J.P. Nagar 6th phase	12.8988°N 77.5704°E	
Ramshetty Palya Kere	sports playground, residential	13.0079°N 77.5580°E	
Sampangi	sports stadium, Sree Kanteerava Stadium, educational institutions, hospitals, Cubbon Park	12.9683°N 77.5905°E	
Saneguruvana halli	park, Karnataka State Pollution Control Board buildings	12.9907°N 77.5441°E	
Shoolay	sports stadium, Bangalore Football Stadium	12.9694°N 77.6112°E	
Siddikatte	KR Market	12.9656°N 77.5761°E	
Srinivagilu	residential, office, restaurants	12.9366°N 77.6311°E	
Sunkal	Sunnakal tank; Shantinagar bus stand, bus depot, residential	12.9551°N 77.5933°E	
Venkatarayana	residential layout	12.8902°N 77.5448°E	

=== Other lakes in Urban District ===
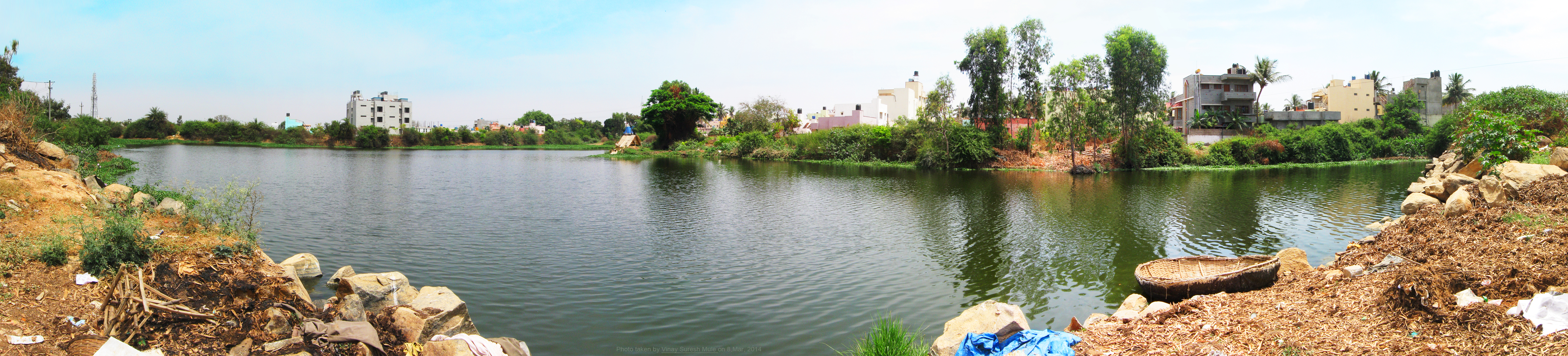
Varanasi Lake, Ramamurthy Nagar

Name	Area (acres)	Coordinates
Greater than 100 acres
Hesaraghatta	1912	13.1574°N 77.4888°E
Byramangala		12.7654°N 77.4244°E
Varanasi Lake		13.026383°N 77.686585°E
Muthanallur	600	12.8221°N 77.7282°E
Hennagara	172	12.7776°N 77.6614°E
