= Dharmambudhi Lake =

Former historic reservoir in Bengaluru, India

- Dharmambudhi Tank
- Interactive map of Dharmambudhi Lake
- Location: Bengaluru, Karnataka, India
- Coordinates: 12.9779°N 77.5721°E
- Type: Former tank
- Basin countries: India

Dharmambudhi Lake, also known as Dharmambudhi Tank, was a historic water reservoir in central Bengaluru, India. It was one of the principal sources of water for the city's Pete area from at least the 16th century through the 19th century. The reservoir was drained in the early 20th century, and its former bed was filled in during the early 1960s for construction of the city's central bus terminus, now the Kempegowda Bus Station.

The name is commonly explained from the Kannada words dharma, meaning donation or charity, and ambudhi, referring to a collection or body of water.

== History ==
An inscription from the 13th century referring to land below the "big tank of Vengaluru" may be the earliest surviving reference to a reservoir at the site. When Kempe Gowda I founded modern Bengaluru in the mid-16th century, Dharmambudhi was among the settlement's major water sources.

Dharmambudhi, together with the Karanji, Jakkarayana and Hanumanthapura tanks, supplied the Pete area. It was considered the most important of these reservoirs, and water was diverted to it from other tanks during droughts in the late 19th century. Its water was channelled to stone troughs in city streets for collection by residents.

The lake also had civic and religious uses. During the colonial period it was regarded as a feature of the city's landscape, and floating performances were staged there to welcome visiting dignitaries. It was associated with local festivals, including the Bengaluru Karaga. When the lake overflowed during the monsoon, residents celebrated a theppotsava, during which lamps were floated on the water.

== Decline and conversion ==
After piped water was introduced to the Pete, Dharmambudhi lost its importance as a water source and was drained in the early 1900s. The former lakebed became a seasonally wet maidan used for theatre, circuses, livestock fodder and political meetings. Jawaharlal Nehru addressed a gathering there in 1931.

In the early 1960s, the maidan was filled to make way for Bengaluru's central bus terminus. Construction of the bus station began in 1965, and the intercity terminus opened in 1969; the semicircular city-bus terminal was added in the 1980s. The site is now occupied by the Bengaluru Metropolitan Transport Corporation and Karnataka State Road Transport Corporation sections of Kempegowda Bus Station, commonly called Majestic.

== See also ==
- History of Bengaluru
- Lakes in Bengaluru
- Kempambudhi Lake
