= Sarakki lake =

Lake in India

- Sarakki lake in 2026
- Interactive map of Sarakki lake
- Location: Bengaluru, Karnataka, India
- Coordinates: 12°53′54″N 77°34′40″E
- Basin countries: India
- Surface area: 84 acres (34 ha)
- Settlements: Bangalore

Sarakki Lake and vicinity

Sarakki lake is a lake in the southern part of Bengaluru, India, in the suburb of the J. P. Nagar. It is one of the largest lakes in Bangalore and located on Puttenahalli main road. Sarakki is a portmanteau of the native Kannada language words, Saavira Hakki, which translates to "a thousand birds".

The lake formerly covered an area of 84 acres (34 ha), 34 acres (14 ha) of which had been encroached by private builders and other establishments as of 2013. According to a survey conducted by the tehsildar of Bangalore South, 135 encroachments were made into the lake area, following which the High Court of Karnataka, in the case filed by the People's Campaign for Right to water, ordered for clearing the encroached area in August 2014. A 10-day eviction drive began in April 2015 after having issued notices to encroachers. The land reclaimed put estimates at ₹2,000 crore (US$210 million).

In 2012, the Sarakki Lake Improvement Trust (SLAIT) was formed to make efforts towards reviving the lake.

== See also ==
- Lakes in Bangalore
