= Vibhutipura Lake =

- ವಿಭೂತಿಪುರ ಸರೋವರ (Kannada)
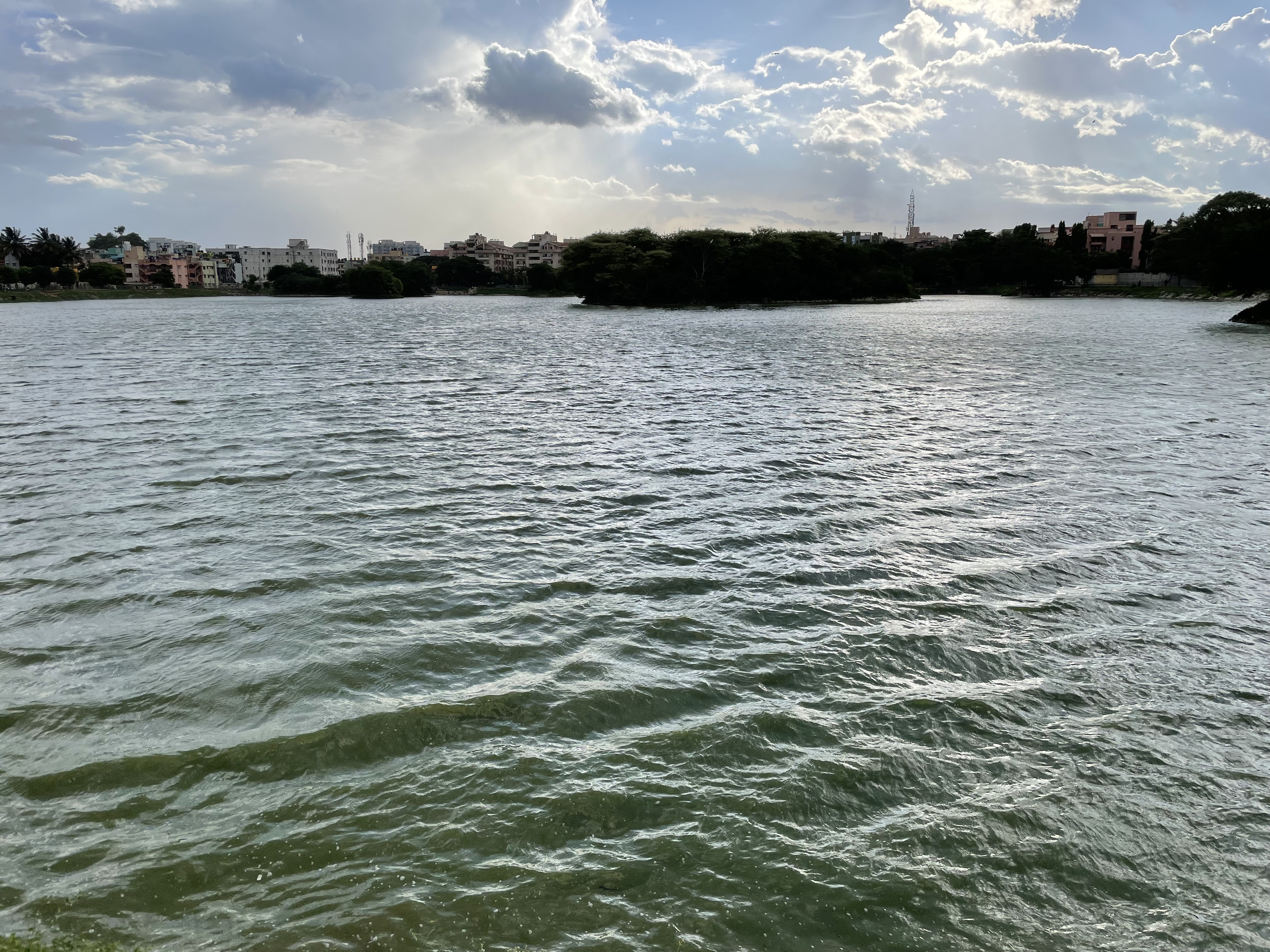
- Vibhuthipura Lake as on 10th June 2023

- Location within Bengaluru Location within Karnataka Location within India
- Location: Bangalore, Karnataka, India
- Coordinates: 12.9678°N 77.6761°E
- Type: Lake
- Primary inflows: Rainfall
- Managing agency: BBMP
- Built: 1903 by Hoysala Empire
- Surface area: 43 acres (17 ha)
- Max. depth: 3 metres (9.8 ft)

Vibhutipura Lake and vicinity

Vibuthipura Lake is a lake in the suburb of Hindustan Aeronautics Limited, in the southeast of the city of Bengaluru. The lake is the part of Bellandur-Varthur Lake series.

== History ==
A lake in Vibhutipura was built by the Hoysalas (10-14th century). An inscription from the 14th century describes the creation of a village and tank in the area.

The lake was maintained by the state forest department. Administration was handed over to Bangalore Development Authority (BDA) and then Bruhat Bengaluru Mahanagara Palike (BBMP).

Local populations became involved with the lake following sewage inflow, dumping and encroachment. This resulted in a populist approach to governance of the lake. Residential associations and Vibhutipura Kere Abhivridhi Mattu Samrakshane Samiti (VIKAS) have campaigned for lake restoration. Restoration activities have included construction of a walking path and construction of a fence. Recreational use has increased. The lake is seasonal. When dry, the lake bed was used for unofficial activities such as cricket and grazing. These have been highlighted in the media as well.

== 2023 ==
In April 2023, there was extensive cleaning of water hyacinths inhabiting the Lake. This led to its rejuvenation. The Lake filled with water, which is a sight to behold. It is unclear though how long this will remain. This is because sewage still flows to the Lake. The Sewage Treatment Plant, envisaged six years back is still pending completion. The walkway broken up during the weed removal is yet to be relaid.

== Encroachment ==
A recent development which is of graver concern is a construction happening on the Lake property. The fence has been broken, concreting done and the walls are coming up. A gathering is planned at 8 AM on Sat, 17 Jun in the Lake premises for wider publicity and force authorities to take notice.
