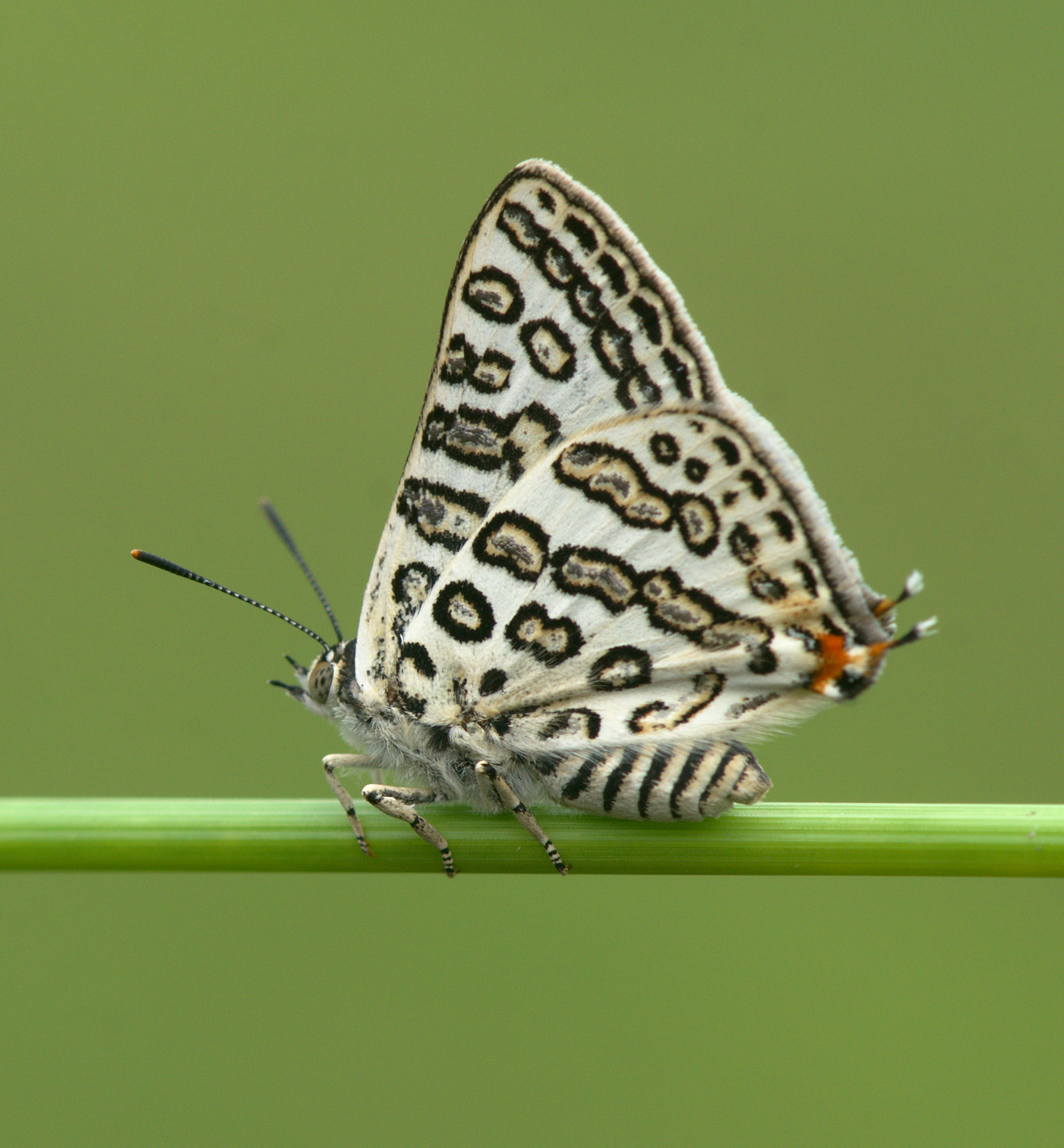

Scientific classification
- Kingdom: Animalia
- Phylum: Arthropoda
- Clade: Pancrustacea
- Class: Insecta
- Order: Lepidoptera
- Family: Lycaenidae
- Genus: Cigaritis
- Species: C. lilacinus

Binomial name
- Cigaritis lilacinus (Moore, 1884)

Synonyms
- Aphnaeus lilacinus Moore, 1884; Apharitis lilacinus (Moore, 1884); Spindasis lilacinus (Moore, 1884); Aphnaeus aestivus Swinhoe, [1887]

= Cigaritis lilacinus =

Lilac silverline

Species of butterfly

Cigaritis lilacinus, the lilac silverline, is a species of lycaenid or blue butterfly found in Asia.

== Range ==
The lilac silverline is found in India, Myanmar and N.Thailand. In India, this butterfly is found from Uttarakhand and Himachal Pradesh to southern Karnataka, with also one record each from Rajasthan and Assam. The species has been located in Rawalpindi in Pakistan, and the following Indian states: Andhra Pradesh, Assam, Karnataka, Madhya Pradesh, Punjab, Rajasthan, Telangana, Uttaranchal, Uttar Pradesh, and West Bengal. The only resident, breeding population discovered is in Hesarghatta Lake in Bengaluru, Karanataka.

== Description ==
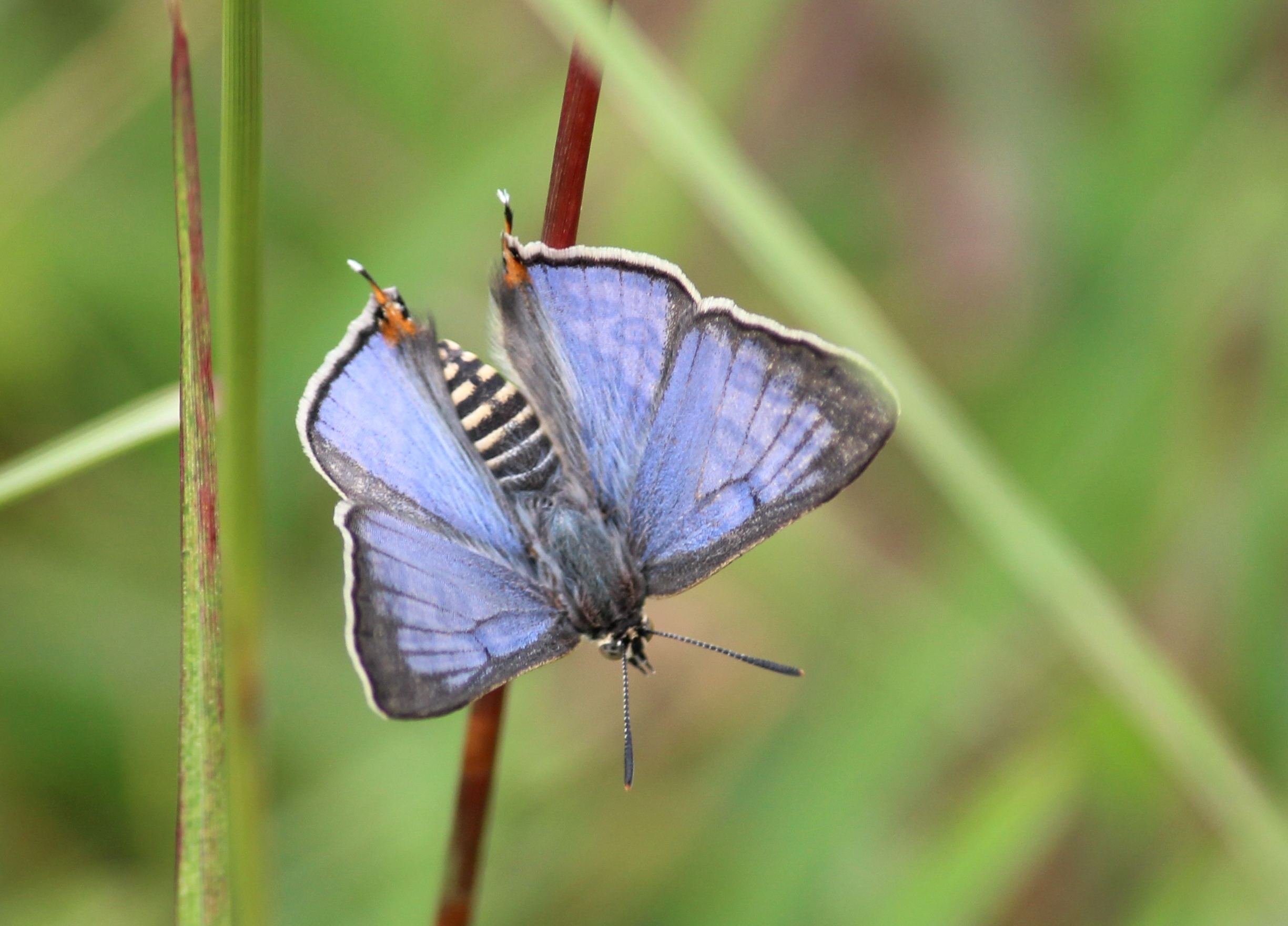
Cigaritis lilacinus male in Karnataka, India

=== Male ===
Upperside brown. Forewing with the basal and discal areas blue, somewhat iridescent blue in certain lights. Hindwing with the basal and inner space similarly blue, an orange-ochreous anal patch, a small black spot in the anal lobe, sometimes another on the margin in the next interspace; tails black, tipped with white, the orange-ochreous colour running half way up them; both wings with the outer marginal line blackish-brown. Cilia white. Underside pale brownish-ochreous, bands slightly darker than the ground colour, finely edged with black, with silvery scales down their middle. Forewing with a small sub-basal round ringed spot in the cell, an oval lajger spot in the middle and another at the end, the last joined on its lower side to a curiously shaped larger spot, of a jagged spear-sliape with a small nodule attached to its lower end, then four round ringed spots near the costa in an irregular triangular form, the outer two the larger, a sub-marginal chain-like macular band from near the costa, broadening gradually hindwards to vein 2, with a black suffused continuation to near the hinder margin, a line of black lunules close to the margin which has a blackish line. Hindwing with three sub-basal ringed spots in a line, well separated from each other, a medial nearly straight band of four conjoined longish and squarish spots, and a discal band of three similar spots, the sub-marginal band and marginal markings as in the forewing, but narrower and not so well pronounced.

— Charles Swinhoe, Lepidoptera Indica. Vol. IX

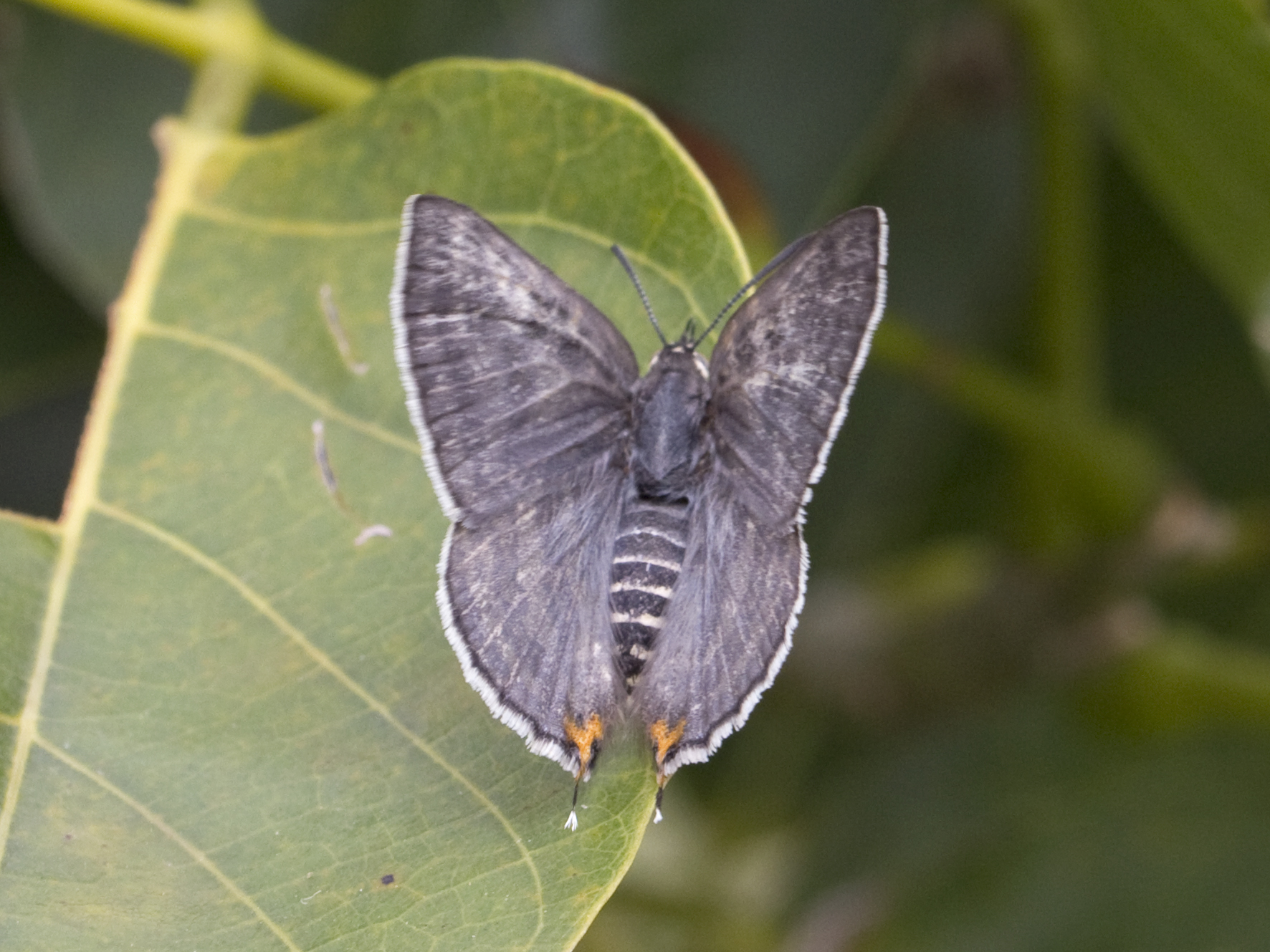
Cigaritis lilacinus female in Karnataka, India

=== Female ===
Upperside dull brown, larger than the male, the wings broader, the outer margin more convex, otherwise both above and below it is similar.

— Charles Swinhoe, Lepidoptera Indica. Vol. IX

== Ecology and conservation ==
The lilac silverline has been recorded from a wide variety of habitats that include protected wildlife reserves such as the Daying Ering Wildlife Sanctuary and Kumbhalgarh Wildlife Reserve, restored institutional campus such as the Agastya Campus in Chitoor, and open plains and gram fields in Uttar Pradesh. In all locations, except at Hessarghatta Lake, very small numbers of the species have been observed, with many observations being one individual. The lilac silverline has been sighted in relatively undisturbed reserves, but a majority of the sightings have been in areas that experience human activities such as grazing, agriculture, and regular visitations by bird photographers. Caterpillars of lilac silverline are tended by ants that offer protection from predators and parasitoids.

The lilac silverline is protected under Schedule II of the Indian (Wildlife) Protection Act. Uncontrolled visits to its breeding habitat in Bengaluru by photographers appear to be destroying its host plant due to the traversing of a large number of vehicles indiscriminately across Hesaraghatta Lake. No other threats have been recognized for this species across its distribution range.

== Gallery ==
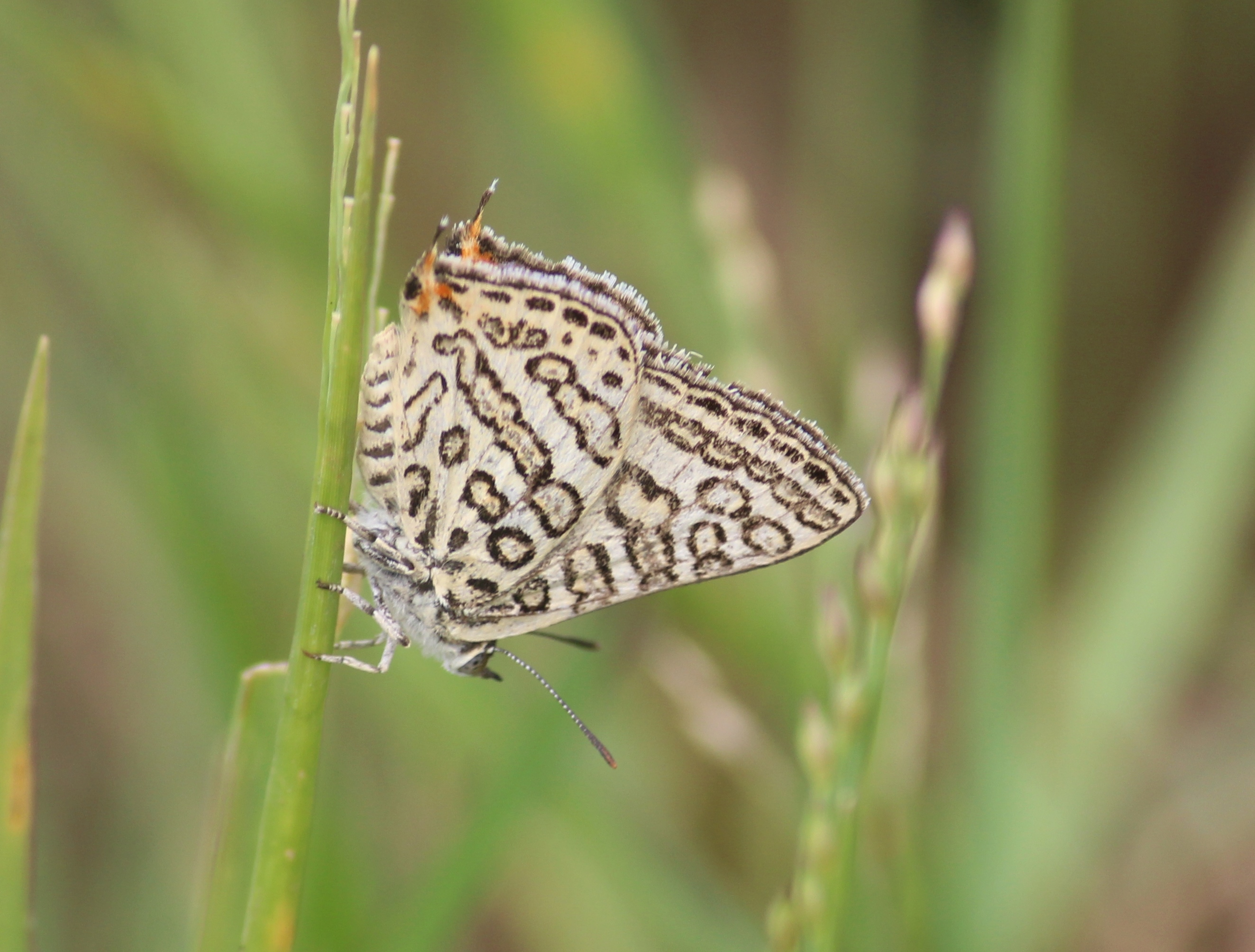
Ventral view (male)

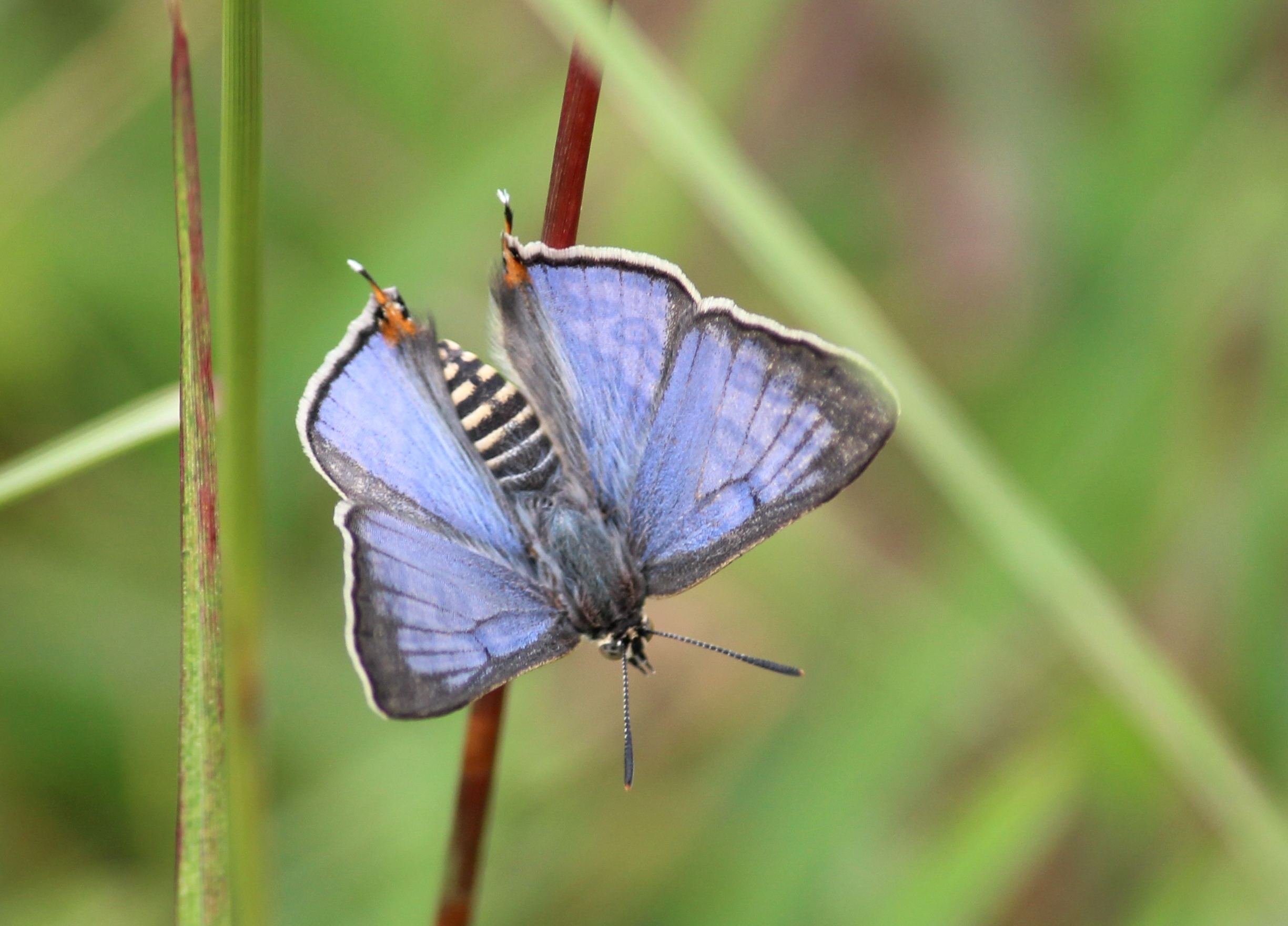
Dorsal view (male)

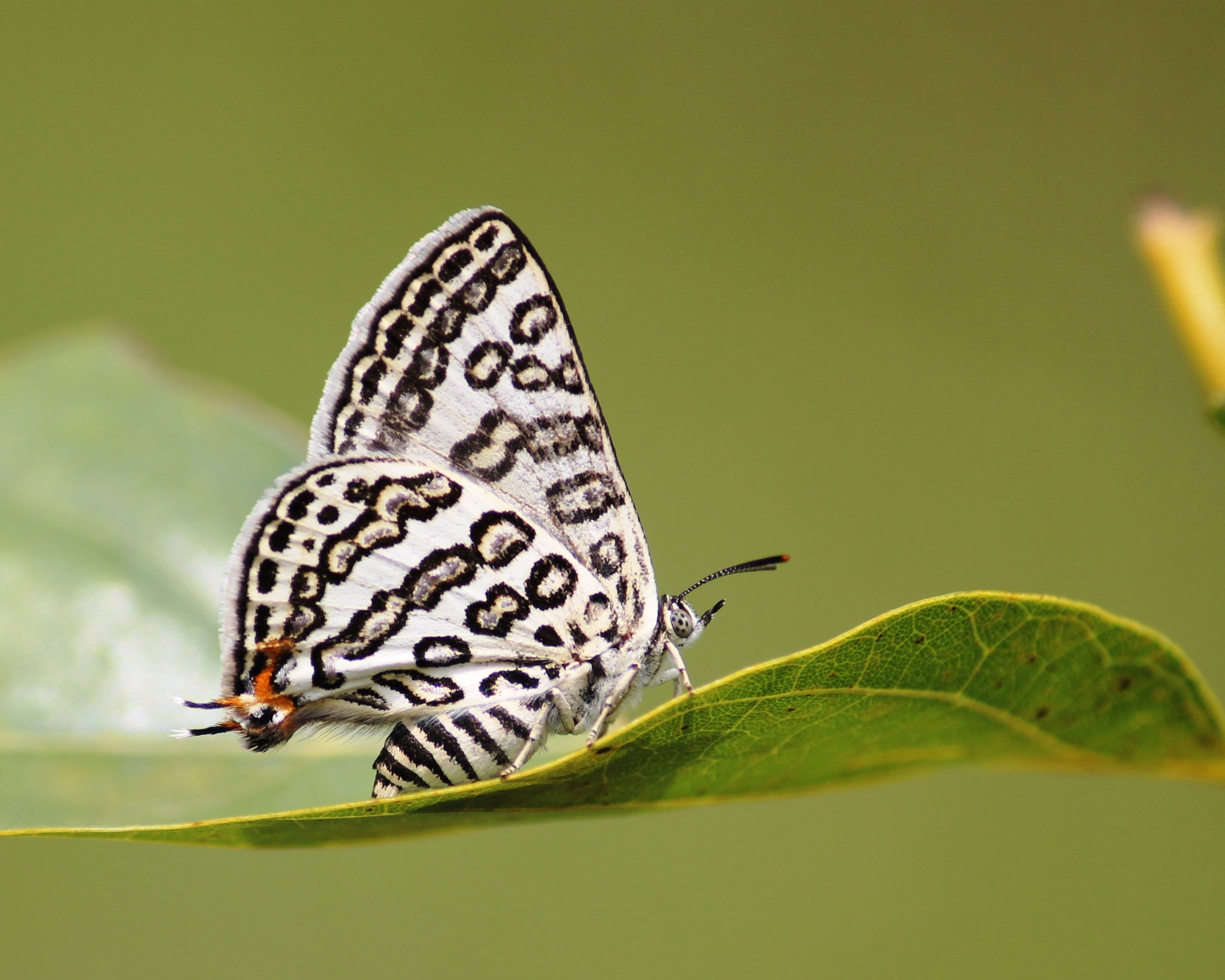
Ventral view (female)

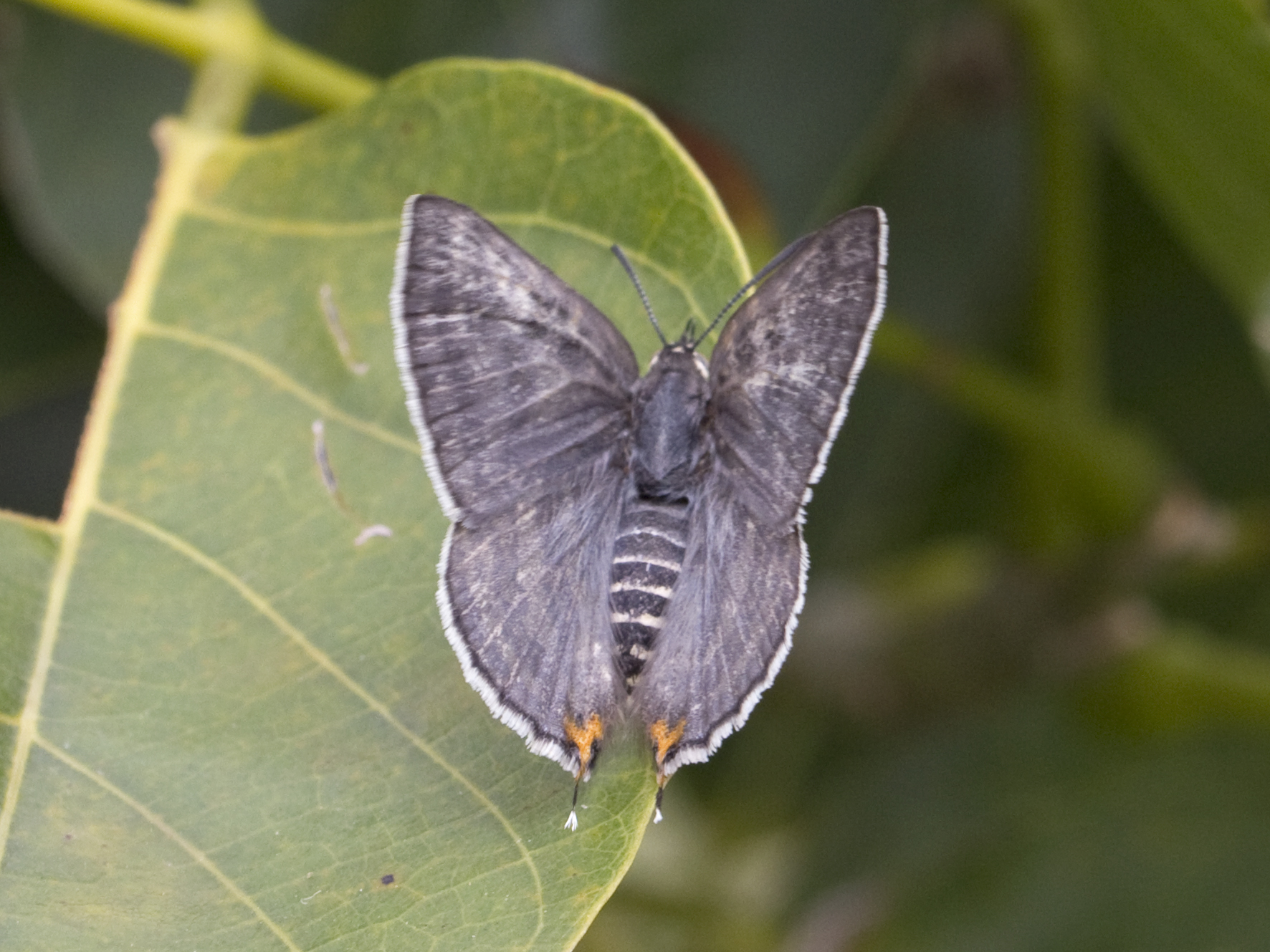
Dorsal view (female)

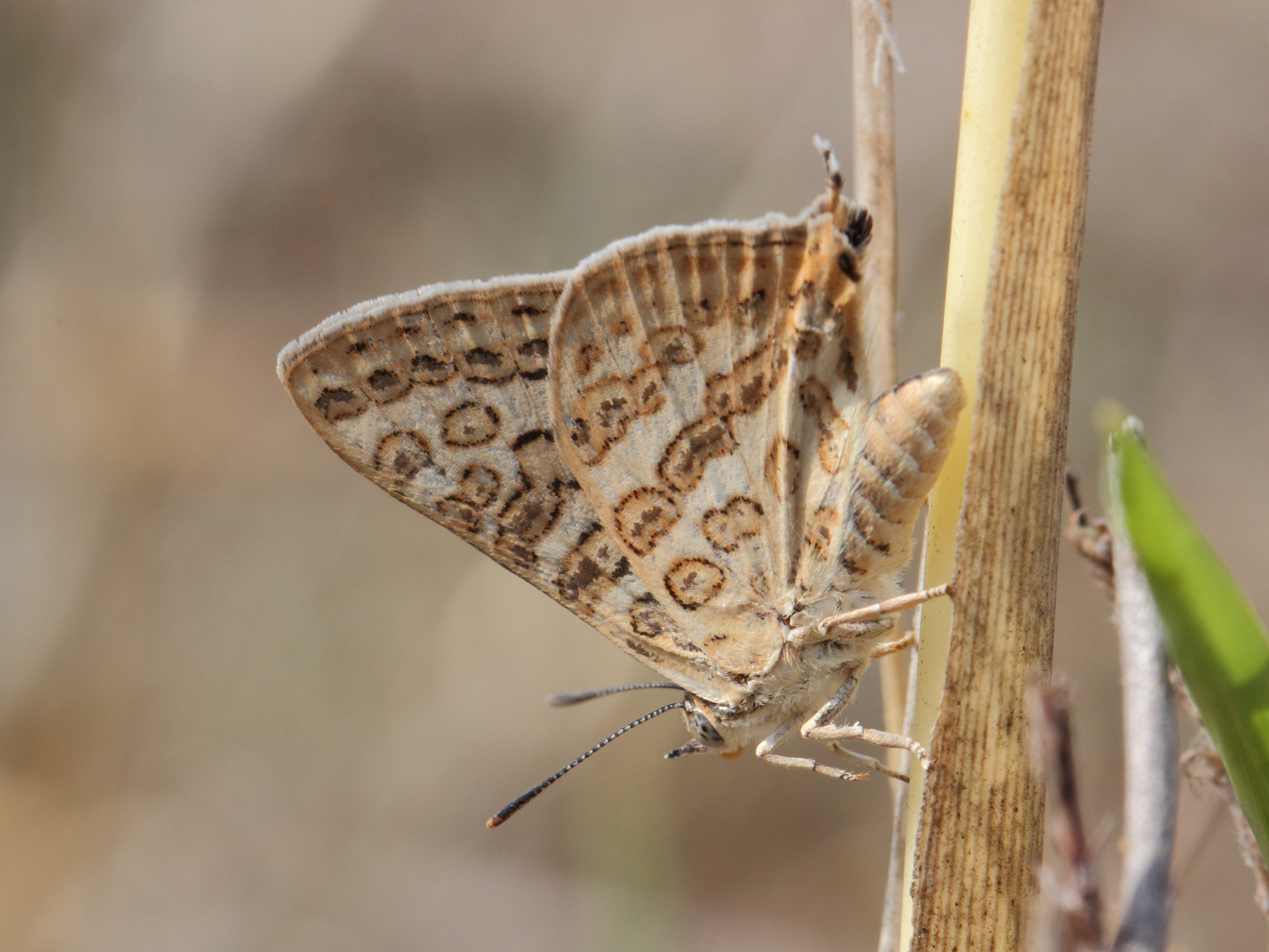
Dry season form
