= Rachenahalli Lake =

Lake in Karnataka

- Location within India
- Location: Bangalore, Karnataka
- Coordinates: 13°03′48″N 77°36′43″E
- Type: lake
- Surface area: 104 acres (42 ha)

Rachenahalli Lake, part of the Yellamallappa Shetty Lake series, a part of Hebbal valley system

Rachenahalli Lake is a lake in Bangalore, India. It is located in Thanisandra in North Bangalore. It is about 1.4km from Amruthahalli police station.

The 104-acre lake was a lifeline to many agricultural activities and livestock in the surrounding villages till the turn of the century. However, development activities including concrete constructions have disrupted the natural flow of water and during heavy rains it overflows. The upstream lakes of Rachenahalli lake include, Jakkur lake and the Sampigehalli lake while the downstream lakes are Nagavara lake and Kalkere lake.
