= Ulsoor Lake =

Lake in Bangalore, India

- Halasuru
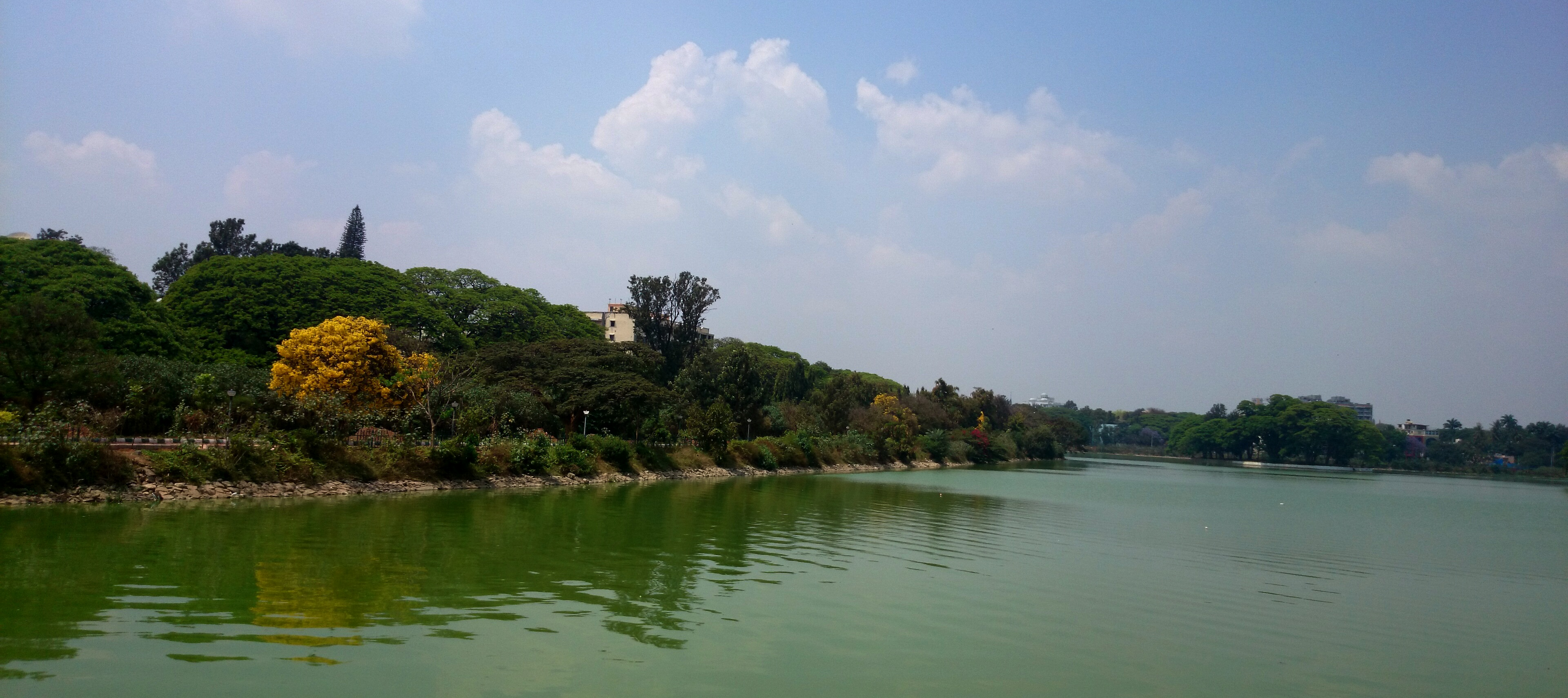
- Halasuru Lake

- Location within Bengaluru Location within Karnataka
- Location: Bangalore, Karnataka
- Coordinates: 12°58′53.3″N 77°37′9.17″E
- Type: Stalewater
- Primary inflows: Rainfall and city drainage
- Primary outflows: Nala
- Catchment area: 1.5 km^{2} (0.6 mi^{2})
- Built: ≈1537
- Surface area: 50 ha (123.6 acres)
- Average depth: 19 ft (5.8 m)
- Max. depth: 58 ft (18 m)
- Shore length^{1}: 3 km (1.9 mi)
- Surface elevation: 931 m (3,054.5 ft)
- Islands: 4
- Settlements: Bangalore
- ^{1} Shore length is not a well-defined measure.

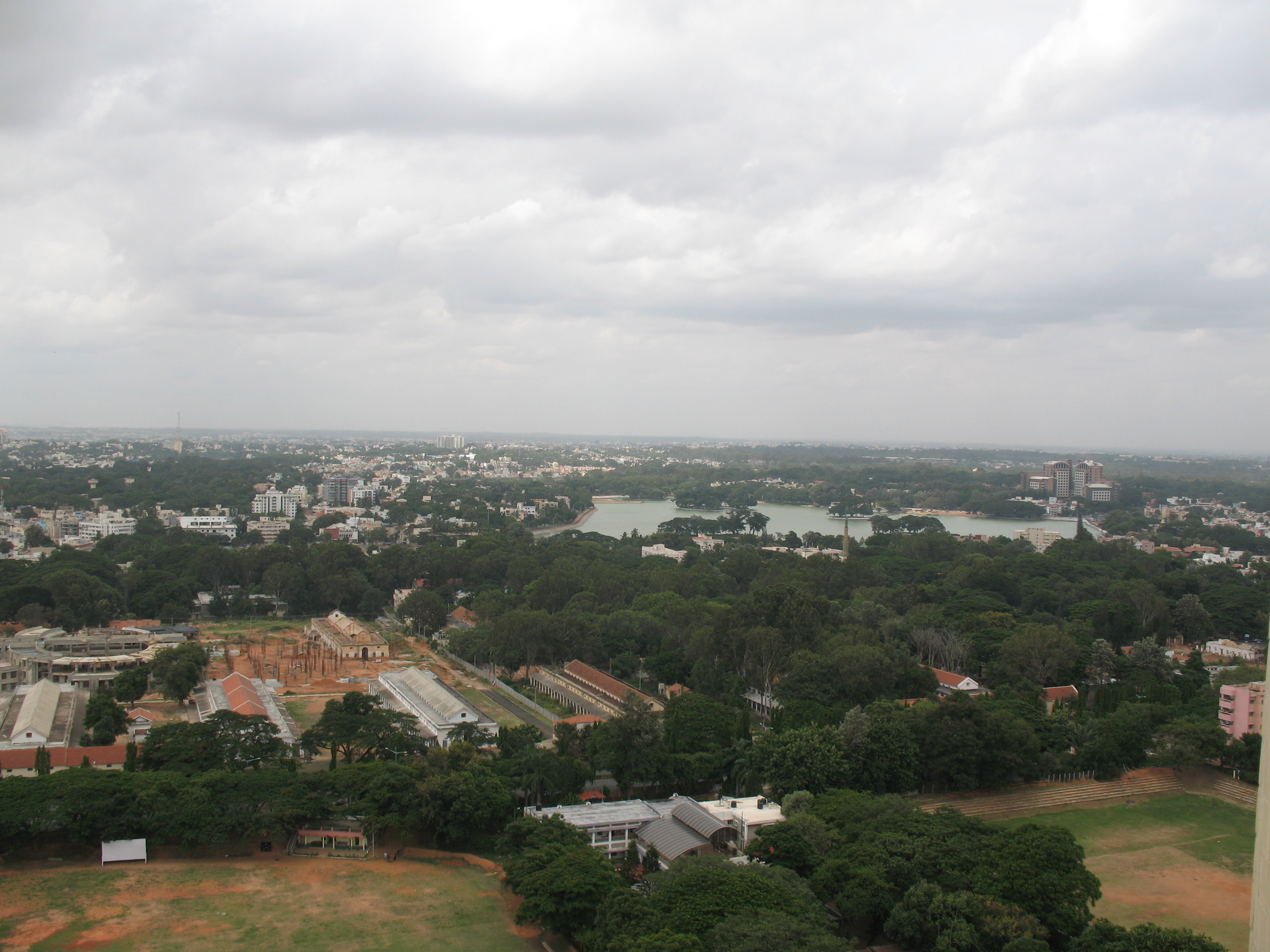
Halasuru Lake with the skyline

Ulsoor Lake or Halasuru Lake, one of the biggest lakes in Bangalore, is located on the eastern side of the city. It derives its name from the name of the locality it is situated, namely, Halasuru, close to M G Road. It is spread over 50 ha (123.6 acres) and has several islands. Even though the lake is dated to Kempe Gowdas's time, the present lake was created by Lewin Bentham Bowring, the then Commissioner of Bangalore. A part of the lake is controlled by the Madras Engineer Group, and the rest by the Bruhat Bengaluru Mahanagara Palike (BBMP)

The lake was subject to several types of pollution threats.

== Water quality ==
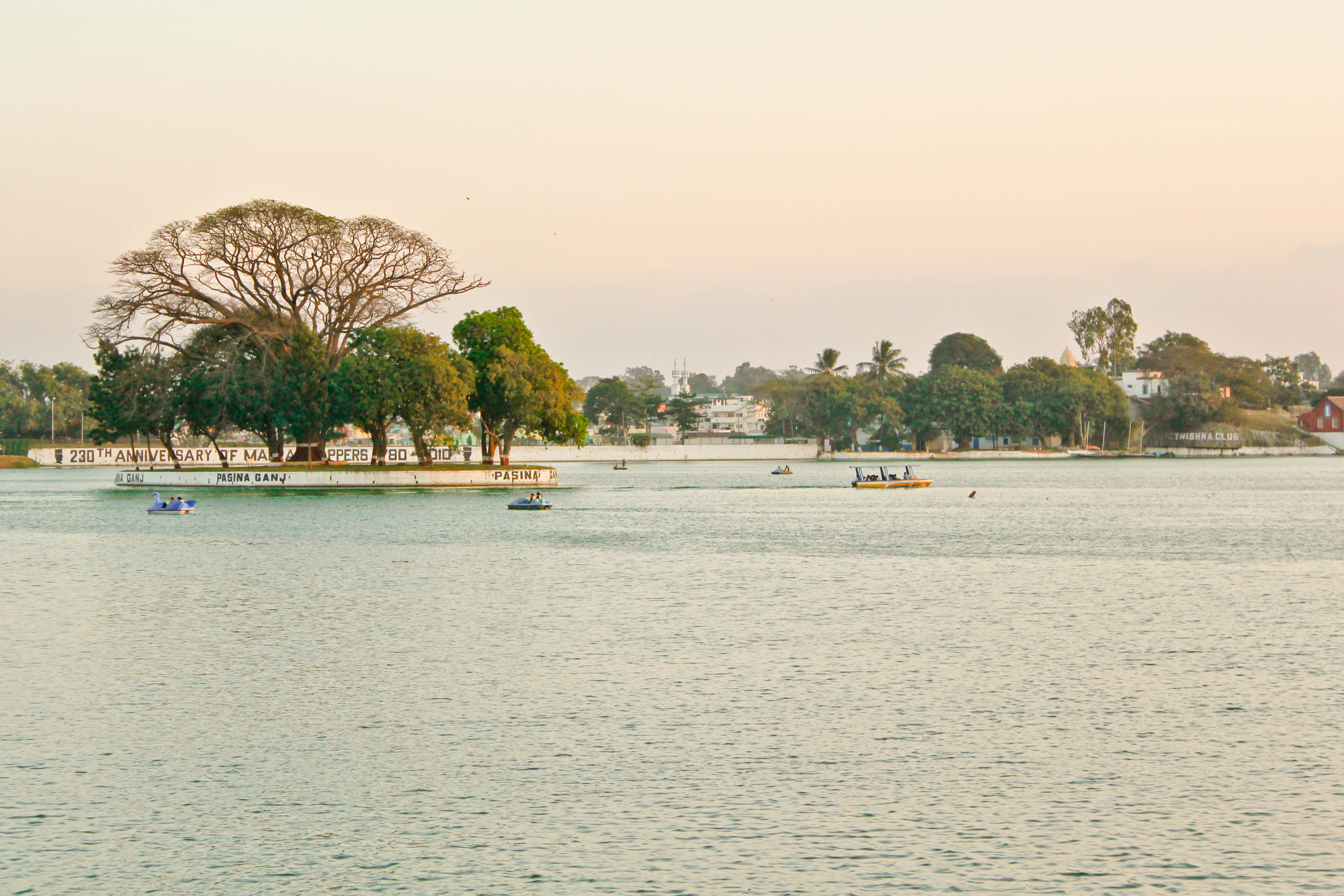

The health of the lake eco-system was, therefore, monitored at six monitoring points on the lake for light, temperature, oxygen, nutrients and the type of aquatic plants that grow in the lake. During the study, it was noted that the lake which has catchment area of 1.5 km^{2} (0.6 mi^{2}) is fed by three drains at different locations; the first drain is from the Madras Engineering Group (MEG) Centre (of the Army), the second drain is from Jeevanahalli and the third drain is from Doddigunta and traverses through Kattariyamma garden, Godhandappa garden, Munivenkattappa garden, Muthamma garden, Muniamma garden, Kempurayana Garden and New Corporation colony and all these areas are within 1 km (0.6 mi) from the lake and inhabited by slums dwellers. The study showed that the daytime DO was very high; varying between 0.2 and 4.5 mg/L. The saprobic nature of the lake water was confirmed by the P/R ratio which was less than one. Eutrophication of the lake was confirmed by further studies which indicated phosphate, nitrogen and chlorophyll levels to be high; with Blue green algae (which is toxic and utilises DO in the night) called the microcystis was noted from surface to bottom of the lake. This affected the aquatic plants and fish (only a few fish species remained). Further studies established the presence of high concentrations of zinc and the metal content in water samples, concentration of Zn, Cd, Cr, Pb and Cu content was found to be very high in sludge samples with depth of sludge recorded as about 1.55 m (5.1 ft).

These studies confirmed the need for urgent restoration and remedial actions in the form of:

- Desilting of the lake is to eliminate contaminants
- Stop all encroachments of the lake with suitable fencing
- Only storm water should be allowed into the lake
- Army units should discontinue effluents from cattle house wash, cowdung wash and army mess wash and consider installation of a biogas plant.
- Plastic bags to be prevented from draining into the lake
- Sewage/manholes at identified locations to be closed.
- Drain water from slum around the lake to be treated before draining into the lake. Preferably, connect the slum storm water and wastewater drain to the nearby Cox Town sewage drain as it is close to the slums
- Prohibit submergence of idols during the festival season
- Remove all slum dwellers from region
- Cultivate and harvest fishes and aquatic plants to deplete the nitrogen and phosphate content

== Restoration works ==
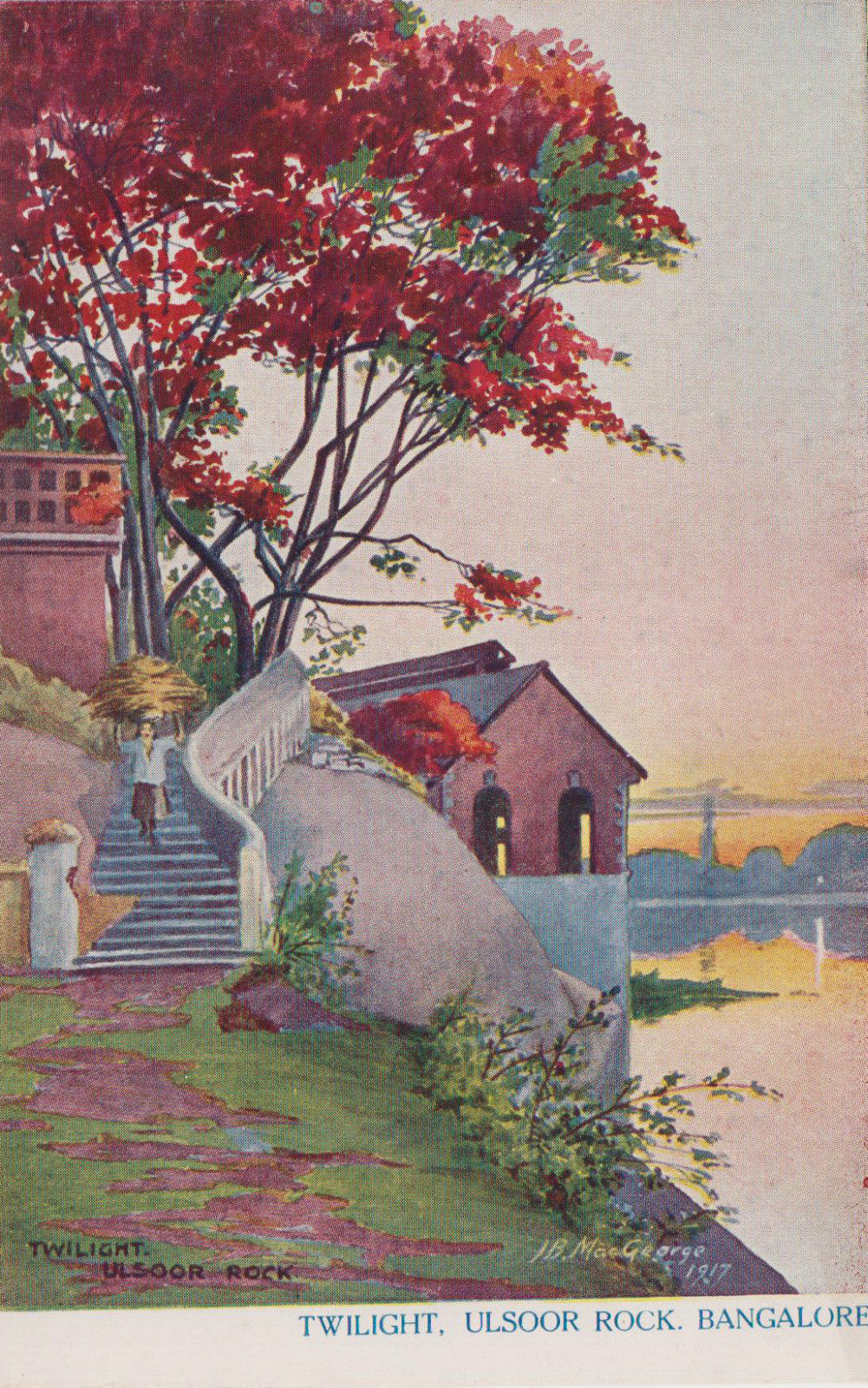
Twilight, Ulsoor Rock, Bangalore - J B MacGeorge, 1917

Restoration works, listed below, have resulted in improvements in the lake environment.

- Aeration of wastewater that is led into the lake
- Park and swimming pool improved
- Desilting of the lake bed and thus increasing depth and the capacity of the lake
- Installation of silt traps at the mouth of the storm water inlets
- Diversion of underground sewages lines from the eastern part of the City through 900 mm pipes bypassing the lake
- Restoration of Aquatic life by introduction of fish species natural to the lake and induction of suitable water plants
- Chain–link fencing to prevent people dumping garbage into the lake
- Boat training facility of Madras Engineering Group (MEG) improved
- Access to public from 9 am to 6 pm with holiday on Wednesday

It is reported that cleanliness drive has breathed new life to the lake.

=== Chinese Bell ===
The Eastern watch tower on Ulsoor Lake had a Chinese bell about 4'3" in height and 3'1.5" in diameter. The Chinese inscription read that the Bell was cast during the reign of Emperor Chien Lung in 1741 and dedicated to the San Yuan Kung temple. Investigations by B L Rice, led to a pensioner and veteran of the Opium War, T Cribb narrating the story of its presence in Bangalore. The bell was taken from a hill temple in Nanking, by C Troop of the Madras Regiment, and brought to St. Thomas Mount, Madras, from where it was shipped to the Bangalore Civil and Military Station, to be suspended near the Quarter Guard of the Troop. The bell was struck on the hour, day and night and the sound was heard for a distance of up to 3 miles. It cracked on being stuck with a 12lb shot one rainy night, making it useless, after which it was dismounted and given to Mr. Smith the Waterworks engineer to be placed at the Tower (p. 26,27). The bell is seen in old photographs, it has since been removed to the Madras Sappers Museum.

==== Chinese Inscription ====
In Bangalore, on a large metal bell in the watch-tower to the east of Ulsoor Tank. (Chinese).

Fa lun ch'ang chuan. Hain shili Waag Chih Lung Wang Chih Hung chiug ha'ien
San Yflan Kung Kung feng. Fo jili tseng hui. Ch'ien Lung Wu nien pa Yueh chi tan kuo tai miu
an. Feng tiao ^ii Shun. Huang t'u Kung ku. Ti tao hsia ch'ang. Wan Ming le yeh. Wu ku
feng teng.

==== English Translation ====
May the Wheel of the Law revolve for ever. A votive offering(2) reverentially made to the Sau Yiian Kung temple by the devotees Wang Chih Lung and Wang Chih Hung. May the Sun of Enlightenment increase in brightness. An auspicious day in the 8th month of the 5th year of the reign of the Emperor Ch'ien Lung. May the empire and the people enjoy peace. May the seasons be regular. May the Emperor enjoy consolidated power. May the Emperor's authority penetrate into the remotest corners of the empire. May the people be contented. May there be abundant harvests (2)A large metal bell.[6]
