= Karnataka State Pollution Control Board =

Indian state government agency

- ಕರ್ನಾಟಕ ರಾಜ್ಯ ಮಾಲಿನ್ಯ ನಿಯಂತ್ರಣ ಮಂಡಳಿ

Statutory body overview
- Formed: 21 September 1974; 51 years ago
- Jurisdiction: Karnataka
- Headquarters: Bangalore, Karnataka, India
- Elected Minister responsible: Eshwara Khandre, Minister of Forest, Ecology and Environment of Karnataka
- Statutory body executives: P. M. Narendra Swamy, Chairman; R Gokul IFS, Member & secretary
- Parent department: Ministry of Forest, Ecology and Environment of Karnataka
- Key document: Water (prevention and Control of Pollution) Act, 1974 (Section 4)
- Website: kspcb.gov.in

The Karnataka State Pollution Control Board (KSPCB) is a legal entity entrusted for control of pollution in the Indian State of Karnataka. The Board regulates air, water and environmental pollution.

== History ==
The Board was originally constituted as the Karnataka State Pollution Control Board for Prevention and Control of Water Pollution in 1974 as per section 4 of the Water (Prevention and Control of Pollution) Act, 1974. It was renamed the Karnataka State Pollution Control Board in 1985 after the enactment of Air (Prevention & Control of Pollution) Act in 1981. The Board was initially mandated only to implement the Water Act. Subsequently, it was empowered to enforce to enforce the Water (Prevention & Control of Pollution) Cess Act, 1977; the Water (Prevention & Control of Pollution) Cess Rules, 1978; and a series of Rules and Notifications framed under the Environment Protection Act, 1986.

== Structure ==
The headquarters of the KSPCB is located in Bangalore. The KSPCB also has 44 regional offices, with at least one office in each district of Karnataka.

== See also ==
- Environmental issues in India
