= Jaraganahalli Lake =

Lake in Bengaluru, India

- Interactive map of Jaraganahalli Lake
- Location: Bangalore, Karnataka
- Coordinates: 12°54′5.7″N 77°34′22.4″E
- Type: Former lake
- Part of: Vrishabhavathi River
- Surface area: 6 acres (2.4 ha)
- Settlements: Jaraganahalli, Yelachenahalli

Location of the disused Jaraganahalli Lake

Jaraganahalli Lake (Kannada: ಜರಗನಹಳ್ಳಿ ಕೆರೆ ) was a lake in the southern part of Bengaluru, India.

== Location ==
It was located on Kanakapura Road near JP Nagar metro station (Jaraganahalli Bus stop, metro pillar No. 75 to 90) on the borders of Jaraganahalli and Yelachanahalli Village. The lake was believed to originally have spread across 6 acres as mentioned in the survey maps. Later, 2 acres of the lake was converted into school playground for Jaraganahalli government school students in 1998.

There is no clear survey number given to this property, but some of the documents state that the lake is located in survey number 29/2C of the Jaraganahalli Village, and survey number 23 of Yelachenahalli, Uttarahalli Hobli, and Bangalore South Taluk.

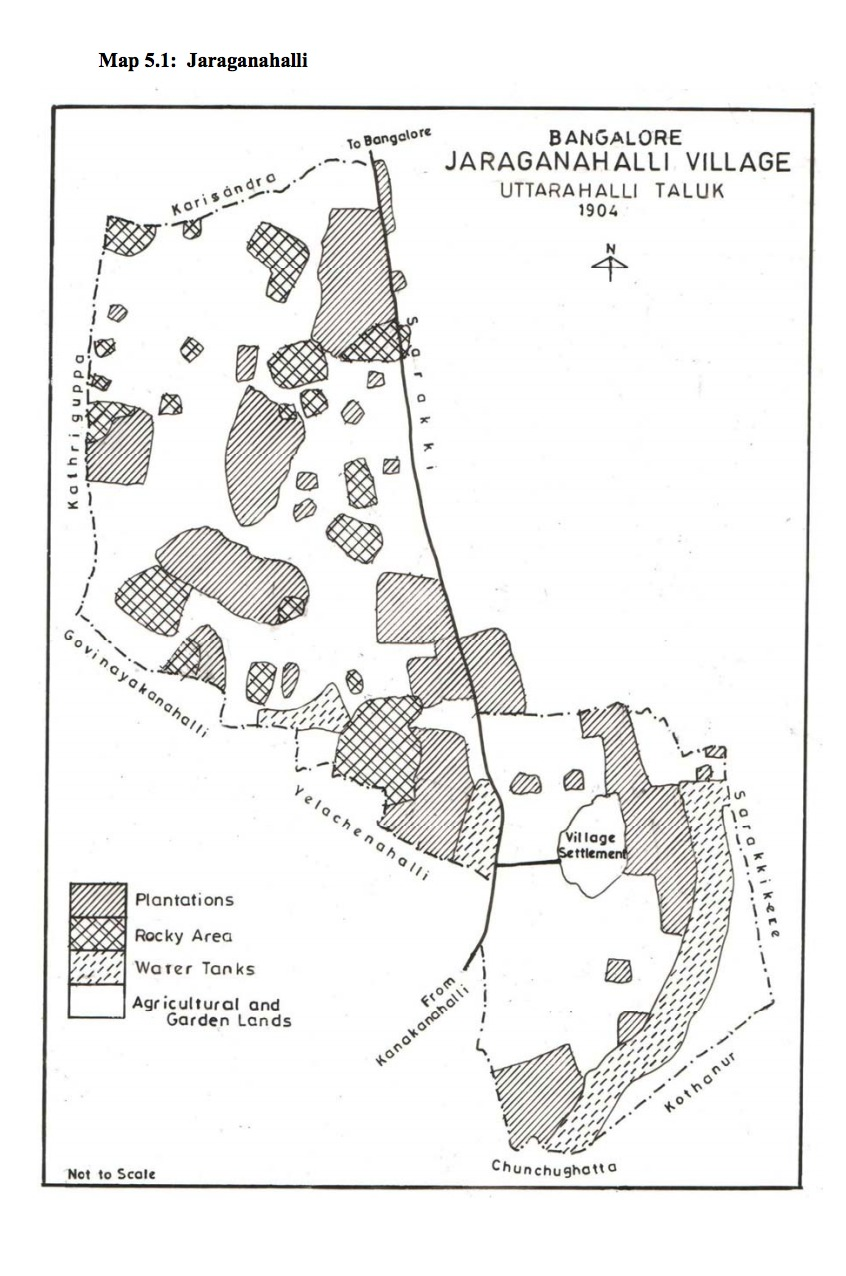
Jaraganahalli (Survey map of 1904 – Jaraganahalli lake on Kanakapura road is visible in the map)

The survey map of 1904 also shows the lake which clearly indicates that the lake existed for at least about 100 years. The google map of 2008 shows a partial existence of the lake. The BDA Revised Master Plan which was based upon the existing survey maps lists the lake as Jaraganahalli Lake D1 and Yelachenahalli Lake D1.

A map of lakes put under the Government of Karnataka website of all the lakes encroached under Uttarahalli Hobli, shows the extent of lake, the encroachment and the current situation of the lake. It compares SSLR maps generated by Revenue Department of Karnataka.

== About ==
In the chapter 5 of the thesis written by Dr. Sudarshan called "The expanding city land development and urban planning in Bangalore", he considers the case study of Jaraganahalli and explains how over a period of time, with an unplanned growth, the Bangalore city has lost its lakes. The thesis also quotes various sources for the same.

The article covered in Deccan Chronicle on 30 August 2018 reveals that the Tahshildar in 1995 had written a series of letters stating the encroachment of the lake.

In 1999, a PIL against dumping of debris and garbage into the lake by the parties who are interested in destroying the lake, the case was later dismissed as there was a case related to this in a lower court.

Over the years the government agencies have converted the place into a garbage dumping ground.
