= Anand Malligavad =

Indian water conservationist and environmentalist

- Born: Anand Malligavad; 1981 (age 44–45); Koppal district, Karnataka, India
- Occupation: Water conservationist
- Writing career
- Period: 2017–present
- Website: www.malligavadfoundation.org

Anand Malligavad, known as the Lakeman of India, is an Indian water conservationist and environmentalist from Bengaluru. He is known for his contribution to the revitalization of 23 deteriorating lakes in Bengaluru.

== Early life ==
He was born in 1981 in the Koppal district of Karnataka. In 2017 he started his conservation work with the Sansera Foundation, alongside B. Muthuraman, to initiate the restoration project for Kyalasanahalli Lake near Anekal.

In 2019, he founded the Malligavad Foundation and left his engineering profession for the cause of water conservation. He was awarded the Community Service Award by the Rotary Foundation.

== Controversies ==
As of April 2024, he and his foundation have been accused of causing “injury to works of irrigation or wrongfully diverting water” under Section 430 of the Karnataka Lake Conservation and Development Authority Act, 2014.

In March 2024, the Farmers Association at Heelalige, a village in Bengaluru Urban district, alleged that Malligavad had undertaken an unscientific process to revive the water body at Heelalige. The process was claimed to have impacted the lake's ability to impound rainwater from its catchment area, depleting the groundwater table completely and creating severe water shortages. An unapproved ring bund was created to block all the water coming to the lake, resulting in the lake being unable to hold rainwater from the catchment area. An inquiry by the Karnataka Chief Minister's office found many flaws in the unauthorized development work. Chandapura Town Municipal Council charged Malligavad and his Foundation for offences under The Karnataka Lake Conservation and Development Authority Act.

Malligavad admitted to creating a bund to divert water from the catchment area, but denied that he had not sought proper permission for this action. He accused the new Karnataka government of having ties with builders and local businessmen and acting upon their interests, but he did not elaborate on how these interests could have influenced the rift between him and the farmers.
