= Chowdeshwari Ward =

- Bruhat Bengaluru Mahanagara Palike Ward
- Chowdeshwari Ward Map 2009-2022 (2009 delimitation)
- Location within Karnataka
- Coordinates: 13.120177291258441°N 77.58216280123096°E
- Country: India
- State: Karnataka
- Metro: Bengaluru
- Parliamentary constituency: Chikballapur
- Assembly constituency: Yelahanka
- Corporator: R. Padmavathi
- Party: Indian National Congress
- Established: 2009
- Abolished: 2025

Government
  - Type: Ward
  - Body: BBMP

Area
  - Total: 6.5 km^{2} (2.5 sq mi)

Population (2011)
  - Total: 36,602
  - Density: 5,600/km^{2} (15,000/sq mi)

Languages
  - Official: Kannada
- Time zone: UTC+5:30 (IST)

Chowdeshwari Ward (Ward No. 2) is one of the 198 Wards, an administrative region of Bruhat Bengaluru Mahanagara Palike (BBMP). BBMP was the former administrative body responsible for civic amenities and some infrastructural assets of Bengaluru in the Indian state of Karnataka. The ward is named after Chowdeshwari Layout near Yelahanka.

== History ==
Detailed Ward Map of Chowdeshwari Ward as per 2020 delimitation

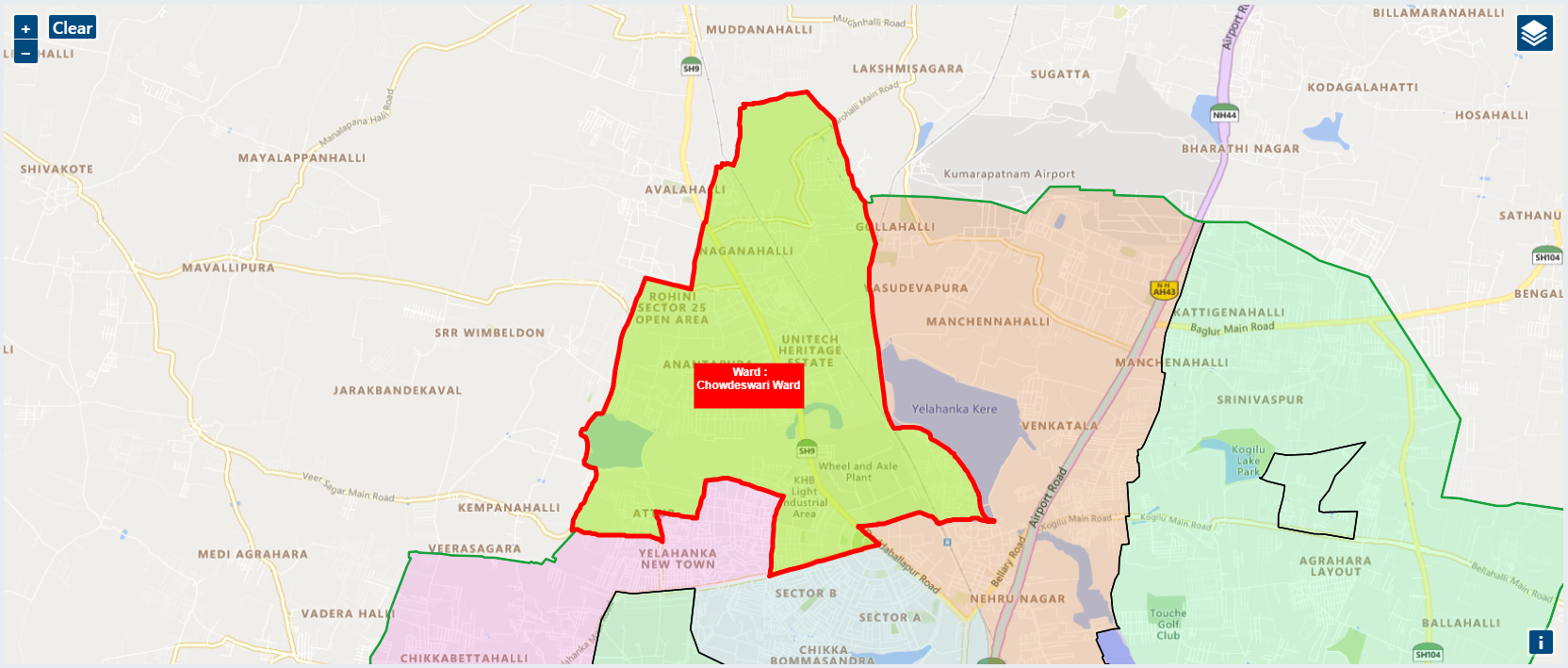
Preview of Chowdeshwari Ward Ward as per 2020 delimitation

The history of municipal governance of Bangalore dates back to 27 March 1862, when nine leading citizens of the old city formed a Municipal Board under the Improvement of Towns Act of 1850. A similar Municipal Board was also formed in the newer Cantonment area. The two boards were legalized in 1881 and functioned as two independent bodies called the Bangalore City Municipality and the Bangalore Civil and Military Station Municipality (Cantonment). The following year, half of the municipal councillors were permitted to be elected, property tax was introduced, and greater powers were given over to the police and local improvement.

In 1913, an honorary president was introduced, and seven years later it was made an elected position. An appointed Municipal Commissioner was introduced in 1926 on the Cantonment board as the executive authority.

After Indian independence, the two Municipal Boards were merged, creating the Corporation of the City of Bangalore in 1949, under the Bangalore City Corporation Act. The corporation consisted of 70 elected representatives and 50 electoral divisions with an office of the Mayor. The first elections were held in 1950.

The name of the council changed — first to Bangalore City Corporation (BCC) and then to Bengaluru Mahanagara Palike (BMP) in the year 1989. In 1989, the BMP expanded to include 87 wards and further increased to 100 wards in 1995, covering an extra area of 75 km^{2}. The council also included 40 additional members drawn from the parliament and the state legislature. BMP was the administering body of Bangalore until 2006.

On 6 November 2006, the BMP Council was dissolved by the State Government upon the completion of its five-year term. In January 2007, the Karnataka Government issued a notification to merge the areas under the BMP with seven City Municipal Councils (CMC)—Rajarajeshwari City Municipal Council, Dasarahalli City Municipal Council, Bommanahalli City Municipal Council, Krishnarajapuram City Municipal Council, Mahadevapura City Municipal Council, Byatarayanapura City Municipal Council, and Yelahanka City Municipal Council; one Town Municipal Council (TMC)—Kengeri Town Municipal Council—and 110 villages around the city to form a single administrative body, Bruhat Bengaluru Mahanagara Palike. (Note: 111 villages mentioned in initial notification; 2 villages later omitted from the list and another village added before final notification) The process was completed by April 2007.

The first elections to the newly created BBMP body were held on 28 March 2010, after the delays due to the delimitation of wards and finalizing voter lists. The second elections were held on 22 August 2015 with the Bharatiya Janata Party winning the majority with 101 Corporators, followed by 76 won by the Indian National Congress, 14 by the Janata Dal-S, and 7 by Independents.

== Salient features (2009 delimitation) ==
Identification	Details
Ward no.	2
Ward name	Chowdeshwari
Taluk	Bangalore North (Additional)
Hobli	Yelahanka‑1
Assembly constituency	Yelahanka
Lok Sabha constituency	Chikballapur
BBMP zone	Yelahanka
BBMP division	Yelahanka
BBMP sub‑division	Yelahanka
Area (km^{2})	6.5
Demographics
Population (2001)	19,626
Male (2001)	10,402
Female (2001)	9,224
Population (2011)	36,602
Population density (2001)	3,019
Population density (2011)	5,635
Population growth rate 2001–2011 (%)	86.5
Households (2001)	9,506
Households (2011)	4,505
Household growth rate 2001–2011 (%)	111
Infrastructure
Road length (km)	86
Street lights (no.)	2,508
Government schools (no.)	6
Police stations (no.)	0
Fire stations (no.)	0
Bus stops (no.)	19
BMTC TTMC (no.)	0
Bus routes (no.)	81
Police station	–
Natural features
Lakes (no.)	2
Lake area (m^{2})	416,208
Lake names	Puttenahalli Lake, Harohalli Lake
Parks (no.)	6
Park area (m^{2})	11,181.39
Playgrounds (no.)	0
Playground area (m^{2})	0
Localities
Harohalli, Harohalli Lake, Kanchenahalli, ISRO Layout, Naganahalli, Naganahalli new layout, KEB Layout Phase I, Balaji Layout, Vinayaka Layout, Ramanashree California Garden layout, Deo Marvel Layout, Mahalaxmi Layout, Nisarga Layout, CRPF Quarters, Puttanahalli, Puttanahalli Kere, Monte Carlo apartment, DG staff quarters, Central Excise quarters, Wheel and Axle plant, FM Goetze plant, Chowdeshwari Layout, Kamakshiamma Layout, East Colony, Yelahanka (P), KHB Colony.
Boundaries
North	By northern & eastern boundary of Harohalli village.
East	By part of eastern boundary of Harohalli village, Chikkaballapur Railway line up to Dodballapur Railway line, southern & western boundary of Yelahanka Tank, Tank Bund Road, Cross Road, Main Road, Bazar Road (extended to the railway line), railway line, NES Main Road.
South	By Dodballapur Road, Crossroad, Cross Road, Puttenahalli Road, Cross Road, Main Road, KHB Road, 4th B Cross (Yelahanka CMC ward boundary), 4th Main.
West	By Yelahanka CMC ward boundary, eastern & northern boundary of Ananthpura village, and southern & western boundary of Harohalli village (BBMP limits).

== Salient features (2020 delimitation) ==
*	Ward No.	1
*	Ward Name	Kempegowda
*	Assembly Constituency	Yelahanka
*	Lok Sabha Constituency	Chikballapur
*	Area (km^{2})	9.6905
*	Population (2011)	47075
*	Popn density (2011)	4858
*	Male Population (2011)	25023
*	Female Population (2011)	22052
*	SC Population (2011)	5105
*	ST Population (2011)	1403
*	Localities in the ward:	ISRO Layout, Naganahalli, Harohalli, Harohalli kere, Srinidhi Layout, KEB Layout 1st Phase, CRPF Campus, Balaji Layout, Kenchenahalli, Heritage Estate, Vinayaka Layout, Puttanahalli, DUO Marvell Layout, Anantapura, Nisarga Layout, Mahalakshmi Layout, Ramanashri California Garden Layout, Atturu, Muneshwara Layout, Ananda Nagar, Yelahanka 5th Stage, KSSIDC Industrial Estate, Airforce Quarters, Wheel & Axle Plant (P), Kamakshamma Layout, Yelahanka Satellite Town (P), Chowdeshwari Layout.
Boundary	North	By Existing Ward Boundary (2009 delimitation) BBMP Boundary Limit.
Boundary	East	By Existing Ward Boundary (2009 delimitation), Chikkaballapur Railway line up to Dodballapur Railway line, Yelahanka Lake Southside Boundary.
Boundary	South	By Tank Bund Road, Railway over bridge and joining towards Chikkaballapur Railway line and Dodballapur Railway line, Wheel and Axle plant Railway line from Yelahanka Junction, Jayaprakash Narayan Nagar Road, Dodballapur road, Yeshwanthpura Road (Major Sandeep Unnikrishnan Road), Puttenahalli Road (1st Main Road), 4th Main (Shiva Mandir Road), 6th Main, 5th Cross, Attur Road, Veerasagara Main Road.
Boundary	West	By Existing Ward Boundary (2009 delimitation) BBMP Boundary Limit.

== Salient features (2023 delimitation) ==
*	Ward No.	1
*	Ward Name	Chowdeshwari
*	Assembly Constituency	Yelahanka
*	Lok Sabha Constituency	Chikballapur
*	Area (km^{2})	3.37
*	Population (2011)	42775
*	Popn density (2011)	12693
*	Male Population (2011)	22369
*	Female Population (2011)	20406
*	Localities in the ward:	KSSIDC Industrial Area, Wheel and Axle plant, Chowdeshwari Layout, Air Force Quarters, Yelahanka Satellite Town (Part), Yelahanka (Part), Kamakshiamma Layout
Boundary	North	By Storm Water Drain
Boundary	East	Railway Line (Yelahanka to Chikballapur line), Yelahanka Lake Limits (western), Tank Bund Road (Existing Ward Boundary - 2009 delimitation), Main Road, (Existing Ward Boundary - 2009 delimitation), Majid Road, (Existing Ward Boundary - 2009 delimitation), Bazaar Road (Existing Ward Boundary - 2009 delimitation), Main Road, Cross Road, CMC Road, NES Main Road
Boundary	South	By Doddaballapura Road, Yelahanka New Town Main Road (Yeshwanthapura Road)
Boundary	West	Attur Road, 3rd Cross Road, Yelahanka 4th Phase Main (4th Main) Road, Shiva Mandir Road, 4th B Cross, KHB (6th Cross) Road, KHB Colony Road, Puttenahalli Main Road, Doddaballapura Road

== Demographics ==
Population Overview of Yelahanka Ward
Ward	Population	Census Year	Delimitation Year
Chowdeshwari	19626	2001	2009
Chowdeshwari	36602	2011	2009
Chowdeshwari	47075	2011	2020
Chowdeshwari	42775	2011	2023

== Elected representatives ==
Election Year	Ward Name	Name of Corporator	Party Affililiation	Reservation category
2010	Kempegowda	K. V. Yashoda	Bharatiya Janata Party	Backward Category A (Women)
2015	Kempegowda	R. Padmavathi	Indian National Congress	General (Women)
2024				

== See also ==
- List of wards in Bangalore (2010-2020)
- List of wards in Bangalore
- 2010 Greater Bengaluru Municipal Corporation election
- 2015 Greater Bengaluru Municipal Corporation election
