= Puttenahalli Lake =

Puttenahalli Lake may refer to:

- Puttenahalli Lake (Yelahanka), a lake in North Bengaluru, Karnataka, India
- Puttenahalli Lake (JP Nagar), a lake in South Bengaluru, Karnataka, India
