= Attur Ward =

- Bruhat Bengaluru Mahanagara Palike Ward
- Attur Ward Map 2009-2022 (2009 delimitation)
- Location within Karnataka
- Coordinates: 13.105624804732672°N 77.56562828073321°E
- Country: India
- State: Karnataka
- Metro: Bengaluru
- Parliamentary constituency: Chikballapur
- Assembly constituency: Yelahanka
- Corporator: Netra Pallavi
- Party: Indian National Congress
- Established: 2009
- Abolished: 2025

Government
  - Type: Ward
  - Body: BBMP

Area
  - Total: 8.8 km^{2} (3.4 sq mi)

Population (2011)
  - Total: 58,129
  - Density: 6,600/km^{2} (17,000/sq mi)

Languages
  - Official: Kannada
- Time zone: UTC+5:30 (IST)

Attur Ward (Ward No. 3), is one of the 198 Wards (an administrative region) of Bruhat Bengaluru Mahanagara Palike, the former administrative body responsible for civic amenities and some infrastructural assets of Bengaluru in the Indian state of Karnataka.

== History ==
Detailed Ward Map of Attur Ward as per 2020 delimitation

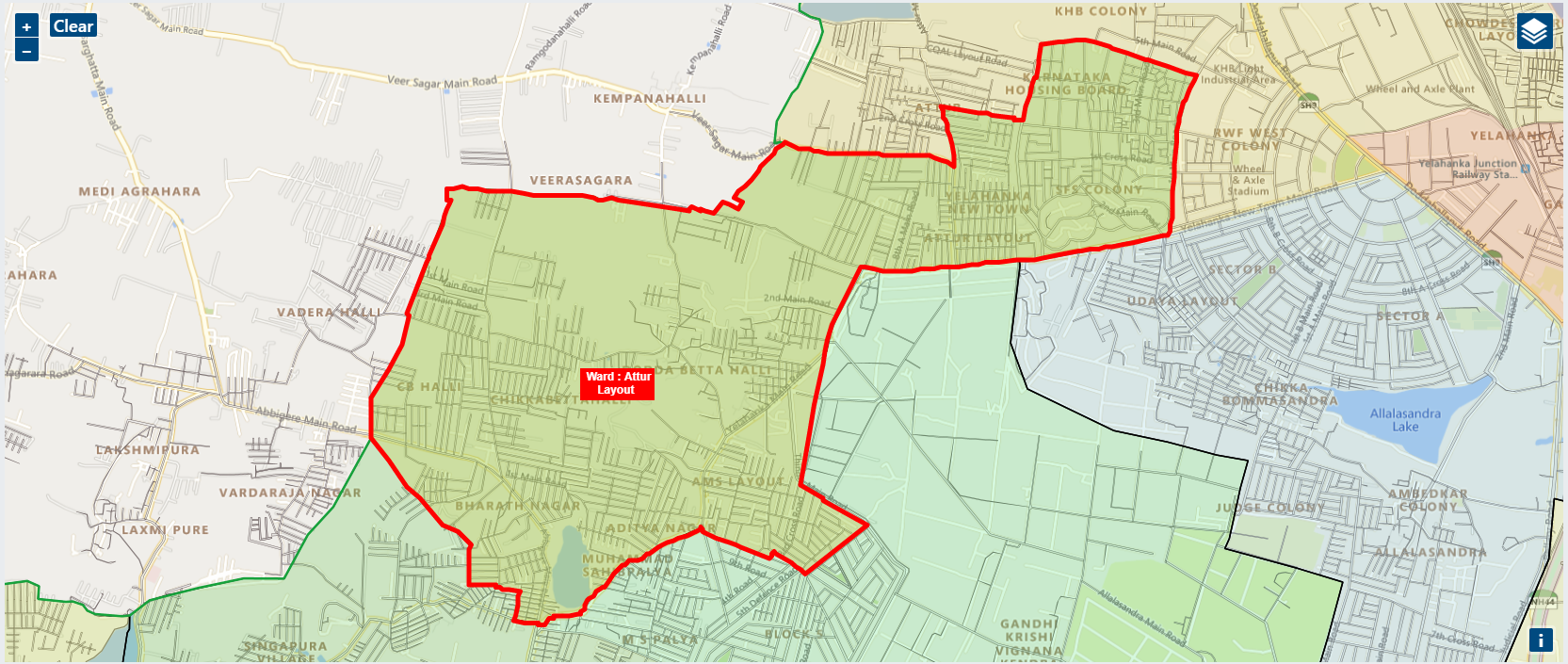
Preview of Attur Ward Ward as per 2020 delimitation

The history of municipal governance of Bangalore dates back to 27 March 1862, when nine leading citizens of the old city formed a Municipal Board under the Improvement of Towns Act of 1850 with a similar Municipal Board was also formed in the newer Cantonment area. The two boards were legalised in 1881, and functioned as two independent bodies called the Bangalore City Municipality and the Bangalore Civil and Military Station Municipality (Cantonment). The following year, half of the municipal councillors were permitted to be elected, property tax was introduced and greater powers given over police and local improvement.

In 1913 an honorary president was introduced, and seven years later made an elected position. An appointed Municipal Commissioner was introduced in 1926 on the Cantonment board as the executive authority.

After Indian independence, the two Municipal Boards were merged to form the Corporation of the City of Bangalore in 1949, under the Bangalore City Corporation Act. The corporation then consisted of 70 elected representatives and 50 electoral divisions and the office of Mayor introduced for the first time. The first elections were held in 1950.

In 1989, the BMP expanded to include 87 wards and further increased to 100 wards in 1995, covering an extra area of 75 km^{2}. The council also included 40 additional members drawn from the parliament and the state legislature.

Bangalore Mahanagara Palike (BMP), was the administering body of Bangalore till 2006. On 6 November 2006, the BMP Council was dissolved by the State Government upon the completion of its five-year term. In January 2007, the Karnataka Government issued a notification to merge the areas under then Bangalore Mahanagara Palike with seven City municipal council (CMC)'s (Rajarajeshwari City Municipal Council, Dasarahalli City Municipal Council, Bommanahalli City Municipal Council, Krishnarajapuram City Municipal Council, Mahadevapura City Municipal Council, Byatarayanapura City Municipal Council and Yelahanka City Municipal Council), one Town municipal council (TMC) (Kengeri Town Municipal Council) and 110 villages around the city to form a single administrative body, Bruhat Bengaluru Mahanagara Palike (111 villages mentioned in initial Notification. Later 2 villages omitted from the list and another village added before final Notification). The process was completed by April 2007 and the body was renamed Bruhat Bengaluru Mahanagara Palike (Greater Bangalore Municipal Corporation). The first elections to the newly created BBMP body were held on 28 March 2010, after the delays due to the delimitation of wards and finalizing voter lists. The second elections were held on 22 August 2015 with the Bharatiya Janata Party winning the majority with 101 Corporators (Indian National Congress won 76, Janata Dal-S won 14 and Independents - 7)

This ward is named after Attur Layout near Yelahanka.

== Salient features (2009 delimitation) ==
*	Ward No.	2
*	Ward Name	Chowdeshwari
*	Taluk	Bangalore North (Additional)
*	Hobli	Yelahanka-1
*	Assembly Constituency	Yelahanka
*	Lok Sabha Constituency	Chikballapur
*	Area (km^{2})	6.5
*	Household (HH) - 2001	9506
*	Household (HH) - 2011	4505
*	Population (2001)	
*	Male Population (2001)	
*	Female Population (2001)	19626
*	Population (2011)	36602
*	Popn density (2001)	3019
*	Popn density (2011)	5635
*	Popn growth rate (%) 2001 - 2011	86.5
*	HH growth rate (%) 2001 - 2011	111
*	BBMP Zone	Yelahanka
*	BBMP Division	Yelahanka
*	BBMP Sub-Division	Yelahanka
*	Road length (km)	169
*	Lakes #	2
*	Lake area (sq m)	307428
*	Parks #	30
*	Park area (sq m)	98281.4
*	Playgrounds #	4
*	Playground area (sq m)	40131
*	Govt Schools #	7
*	Police stations #	1
*	Fire stations #	0
*	Bus stops #	31
*	BMTC TTMC #	1
*	Street lights #	4227
*	Police station	Yelahanka Satellite Town
*	Lake name	Chikkabettahalli Lake, Attur Lake
*	Bus routes #	106
*	Localities in the ward:	Ananthapura, Chikka Bettahalli, Dodda Bettahalli, Bharat Nagar (M. S. Palya), Chandrappa Layout, Hillside Meadows Layout, Sai Nagar Phase I and II, Basavalingappa Layout, Netravathi Layout (P), Sai orchards, Best County 3, G. Ramaiah Layout, Jyothi Nagar, GPF Layout, Muneshwara Layout Ist and 2nd Phases, Hari Raju Layout, Vaderahallikere, AMS Layout, Veerasagara Kere, Thirumala Nagar, Atturu Layout, Muneshwara Layout (Atturu), Anand Nagar, Atturu, Atturu Kere, KHB apartments, Yelahanka 4th and 5th Stages, 208-SFS colony, Central excise and custom staff quarters, Air force quarters, Yelahanka new town, KSIDC industrial estate, WAP staff quarters
Boundary	North	By Northern and eastern boundary of Ananthapura village
Boundary	East	By eastern boundary of Ananthapura, 4th Main road, 4th B Cross, KHB road, other road up to Dodballapur road, Dodballapur road, Ballari Road, Existing CMC ward boundary, Eastern boundary of Dodda Bettahalli village
Boundary	South	By Vidyaranyapura main road, Southern boundary of Chikka bettahalli village, Main road, Cross road, Main road, Main road leading to MS Palya junction, Southern boundary of Chikka bettahalli village
Boundary	West	By Western boundary of Chikka Bettahalli and Dodda Bettahalli villages, northern boundary Dodda Bettahalli, Western boundary of Ananthapura village (BBMP limits).
	references	

== Salient features (2020 delimitation) ==
*	Ward No.	3
*	Ward Name	Attur Layout
*	Assembly Constituency	Yelahanka
*	Lok Sabha Constituency	Chikballapur
*	Area (km^{2})	5.158
*	Population (2011)	43071
*	Popn density (2011)	8350
*	Male Population (2011)	22453
*	Female Population (2011)	20618
*	SC Population (2011)	4396
*	ST Population (2011)	1132
*	Localities in the ward:	Yelahanka New Town 4th& 5th Stage, 208 SFS Colony, Attur Layout, L&T Nagar, Tirumala Nagar, Dodda Bettahalli, Bettahalli Extension, Sri Muneshwara Layout, Chik Bettahalli Village, AMS Layout, Aditya Nagar, MS Palya (P), Bharat Nagar (M.S.Palya), Hill Side Medows, Jyothi Nagar, Sai Nagar Phase I, Chandrappa Layout (P), Sai Orchards, Best county 3, G Ramaiah Layout (P), Hari Raju Layout.
Boundary	North	By Veerasagara Main Road, Atturu Main Road, 5th Cross, 6th Main, 4th Main (Shiva Mandir Road).
Boundary	East	By Puttenahalli Road (1st Main)
Boundary	South	By Yelahanka New Town Road (Major Sandeep Unnikrishnan Road), Existing Ward & AC Boundary, GKVK Road, 4th Cross(Vidyaranyapura Main Road), Lattic Network Road towards Devi Circle, Main Road, Cross Road, Vidyaranyapura Main Road, Yelahanka New Town Road (Major Sandeep Unnikrishnan Road), Existing Ward & AC Boundary, Singapura Main Road, Main Road, Cross Road, 6th Cross, Main Road, Existing Ward & AC Boundary.
Boundary	West	By Existing Ward Boundary (BBMP Boundary Limit )
	References	

== Demographics ==
Population Overview of Yelahanka Ward
Ward	Population	Census Year	Delimitation Year
Attur	24020	2001	2009
Attur	58129	2011	2009
Attur Layout (Bettahalli)	43071	2011	2020

== Elected representatives ==
Election Year	Ward Name	Name of Corporator	Party Affililiation	Reservation category
2010	Attur	K. V. Yashoda	Indian National Congress	General (Women)
2015	Attur	Netra Pallavi	Bharathiya Janata Party	Scheduled Tribe (Women)
2022				

== See also ==
- List of wards in Bangalore (2010-2020)
- List of wards in Bangalore
- 2010 Greater Bengaluru Municipal Corporation election
- 2015 Greater Bengaluru Municipal Corporation election
