= Yelahanka Ward =

- Bruhat Bengaluru Mahanagara Palike Ward
- Kempegowda Ward
- Yelahanka Ward Map 2009-2022 (2009 delimitation)
- Location within Karnataka
- Coordinates: 13.100875°N 77.594743°E
- Country: India
- State: Karnataka
- Metro: Bengaluru
- Parliamentary constituency: Chikballapur
- Assembly constituency: Yelahanka
- Party: Bharatiya Janata Party
- Established: 2009
- Abolished: 2025
- Named for: Kempegowda

Government
  - Type: Ward
  - Body: BBMP

Area
  - Total: 14.51 km^{2} (5.60 sq mi)

Population (2011)
  - Total: 42,913
  - Density: 2,957/km^{2} (7,660/sq mi)

Languages
  - Official: Kannada
- Time zone: UTC+5:30 (IST)

Yelahanka Ward (Ward No. 1), officially known as Kempegowda Ward is one of the 225 Wards (an administrative region) of Bruhat Bengaluru Mahanagara Palike, the former administrative body responsible for civic amenities and some infrastructural assets of Bengaluru in the Indian state of Karnataka.

== History ==
Detailed Ward Map of Yelahanka as per 2020 delimitation

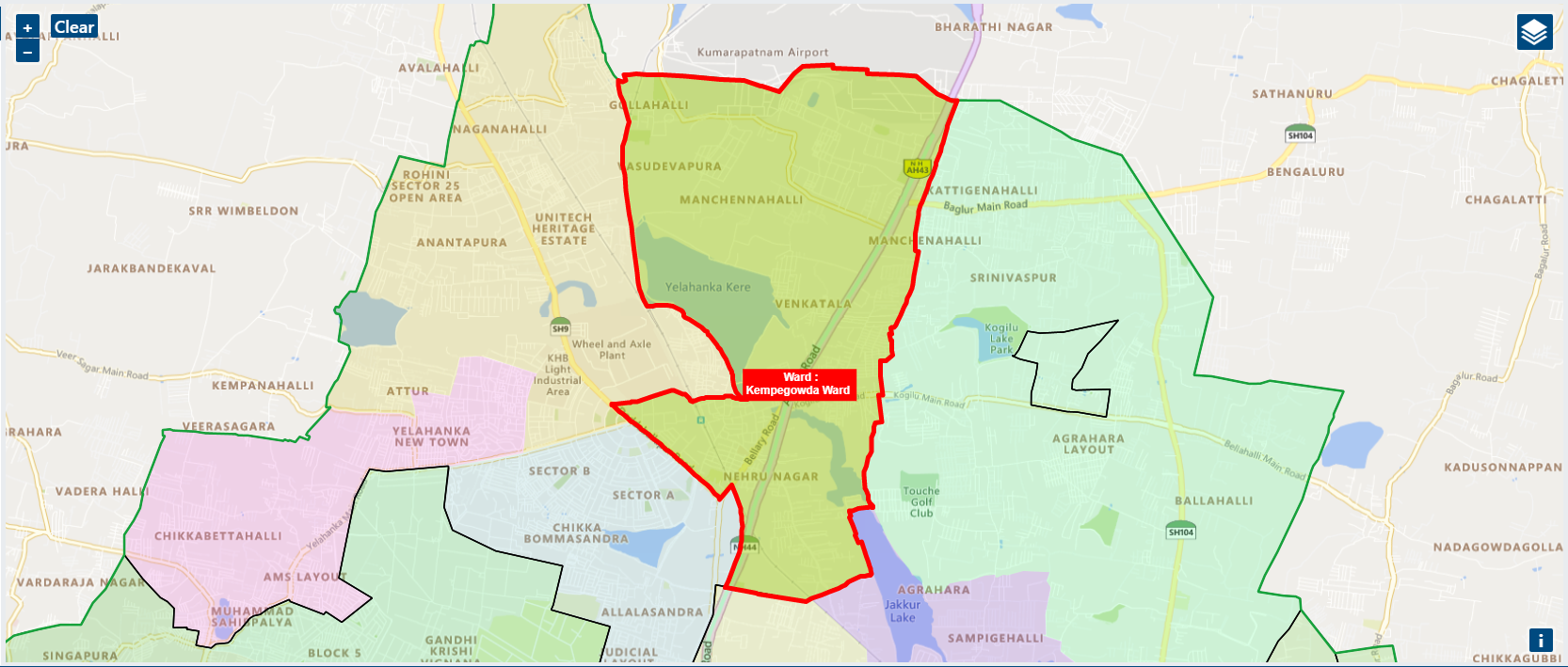
Preview of Yelahanka Ward as per 2020 delimitation

The history of municipal governance of Bangalore dates back to 27 March 1862, when nine leading citizens of the old city formed a Municipal Board under the Improvement of Towns Act of 1850 with a similar Municipal Board was also formed in the newer Cantonment area. The two boards were legalised in 1881, and functioned as two independent bodies called the Bangalore City Municipality and the Bangalore Civil and Military Station Municipality (Cantonment). The following year, half of the municipal councillors were permitted to be elected, property tax was introduced and greater powers given over police and local improvement.

In 1913 an honorary president was introduced, and seven years later made an elected position. An appointed Municipal Commissioner was introduced in 1926 on the Cantonment board as the executive authority.

After Indian independence, the two Municipal Boards were merged to form the Corporation of the City of Bangalore in 1949, under the Bangalore City Corporation Act. The corporation then consisted of 70 elected representatives and 50 electoral divisions and the office of Mayor introduced for the first time. The first elections were held in 1950.

In 1989, the BMP expanded to include 87 wards and further increased to 100 wards in 1995, covering an extra area of 75 km^{2}. The council also included 40 additional members drawn from the parliament and the state legislature.

Yelahanka was the capital of Kempegowda, founder of Bangalore. In the 1980s this locality was developed as a Municipal council with 32 Wards and was also the Taluk headquarters prior to the formation of BBMP. Bangalore Mahanagara Palike (BMP), was the administering body of Bangalore till 2006. On 6 November 2006, the BMP Council was dissolved by the State Government upon the completion of its five-year term. In January 2007, the Karnataka Government issued a notification to merge the areas under then Bangalore Mahanagara Palike with seven City municipal council (CMC)'s (Rajarajeshwari City Municipal Council, Dasarahalli City Municipal Council, Bommanahalli City Municipal Council, Krishnarajapuram City Municipal Council, Mahadevapura City Municipal Council, Byatarayanapura City Municipal Council and Yelahanka City Municipal Council), one Town municipal council (TMC) (Kengeri Town Municipal Council) and 110 villages around the city to form a single administrative body, Bruhat Bengaluru Mahanagara Palike (111 villages mentioned in initial Notification. Later 2 villages omitted from the list and another village added before final Notification). The process was completed by April 2007 and the body was renamed Bruhat Bengaluru Mahanagara Palike (Greater Bangalore Municipal Corporation).

Yelahanka Ward has been renamed after Kempegowda, founder of Bangalore city. Yelahanka was a part of the erstwhile Vijayanagara Empire and also the birthplace of King Kempegowda I.

== Salient features (2009 delimitation) ==
*	Ward No.	1
*	Ward Name	Kempegowda
*	Taluk	Bangalore North (Additional)
*	Hobli	Yelahanka-1
*	Assembly Constituency	Yelahanka
*	Lok Sabha Constituency	Chikballapur
*	Reservation category	Backward Category B
*	Area (km^{2})	10.9
*	Household (HH) - 2001	5010
*	Household (HH) - 2011	8647
*	Population (2001)	21866
*	Male Population (2001)	11490
*	Female Population (2001)	10376
*	Population (2011)	34783
*	Popn density (2001)	2006
*	Popn density (2011)	3182
*	Popn growth rate (%) 2001 - 2011	59.1
*	HH growth rate (%) 2001 - 2011	72.6
*	BBMP Zone	Yelahanka
*	BBMP Division	Yelahanka
*	BBMP Sub-Division	Yelahanka
*	Road length (km)	86
*	Lakes #	2
*	Lake area (sq m)	1441486
*	Parks #	3
*	Park area (sq m)	5899.74
*	Playgrounds #	0
*	Playground area (sq m)	0
*	Govt Schools #	4
*	Police stations #	1
*	Fire stations #	0
*	Bus stops #	35
*	BMTC TTMC #	0
*	Street lights #	2379
*	Police stn	Yelahanka
*	Lake name	Shivanahalli Lake, Yelahanka Lake
*	Bus routes #	136
*	Localities in the ward:	Govindapura, Vasudevapura, Manchenahalli, Yelahanka Airport, Sai spring field colony, Lake view residency, Venkatala, Venkatala Layout, Venkatappa Layout, Vikas layout, Sathyappa Anjanappa Kempamma Layout, Maruthi Nagar, Jayanna Layout, Bhadranna Layout, Shankaranna Layout, Kullappa Layout, Kendriya Vihar, Yelahanka (P), Maheshwari Nagar, Gandhi Nagar, Nehru Nagar, Surabhi Layout, Mantri township, Shobha Ultima villas, Yelahanka Kere, Shivanahalli, Sapthagiri Layout, Basaveshwara Nagar
Boundary	North	By northern boundary of Govindapura village & Yelahanka CMC ward boundary (BBMP limit)
Boundary	East	By western boundary of Kattigenahalli, Yelahanka CMC boundary (eastern boundary of 150-Yelhanka Assembly Constituency)
Boundary	South	By Yelahanka CMC boundary
Boundary	West	By Railway line (Yeshwantapur to Yelahanka junction), Dodballapur road, NES road, Devanahalli road from Rly over bridge to dodballapur road Bazar road, Tank bund road Southern and western Boundary of Yelahanka Kere, Chikkaballapur Railway line, Western boundary of Govindapura village.

== Salient features (2020 delimitation) ==
*	Ward No.	1
*	Ward Name	Kempegowda
*	Assembly Constituency	Yelahanka
*	Lok Sabha Constituency	Chikballapur
*	Area (km^{2})	11.385
*	Population (2011)	39368
*	Popn density (2011)	3458
*	Male Population (2011)	20580
*	Female Population (2011)	18788
*	SC Population (2011)	3736
*	ST Population (2011)	1231
*	Localities in the ward:	BSF & Airport Area (P), Sai Spring Field Colony, Vinayaka Nagar (P), Satyappa Annayappa Kempamma Layout, Vikas Layout, Venkatappa Layout, Venkatala, Venkatala Layout, Lake view Residency, Yelahanka Kere, Maruthi Nagar, Bhadranna Layout, Shankarena Layout, Kulappa Layout, Yelahanka, Maheshwari Nagar, Gandhi Nagar, Nehru Nagar, Jakkur Water Treatment Plant, Shivanahalli, Basaveshwara Nagar, Surabhi Layout, Vidyashilpa Academy, Wheel and Axle plant,
Boundary	North	By BBMP Boundary Limit
Boundary	East	By Existing Ward (2009 delimitation) & 150-Yelhanka Assembly Constituency Boundary, Compound wall, Yelahanka-Kannur Road (Kogilu Road), Existing Ward & AC Boundary, Cross Road, Storm Water Drain, Jakkur Tank Northern & part of Western periphery
Boundary	South	By Existing Ward (2009 delimitation) & 150-Yelhanka Assembly Constituency Boundary, Apartment Compound Wall, Plantation boundary (Existing Ward & 150-Yelhanka Assembly Constituency Boundary)
Boundary	West	By Railway line (Yeshwantapur to Yelahanka junction), Dodballapur road, Ballari Road, Jayaprakash Narayan Colony Road, Railway line (Yeshwantapur to Yelahanka junction), Railway overbridge and joining towards Tank bund Road, Tank bund Road, Yelahanka Lake South side Boundary, Chikkaballapur Railway line, Existing Ward Boundary (2009 delimitation)

== Salient features (2023 delimitation) ==
*	Ward No.	1
*	Ward Name	Kempegowda
*	Assembly Constituency	Yelahanka
*	Lok Sabha Constituency	Chikballapur
*	Area (km^{2})	14.51
*	Population (2011)	42913
*	Popn density (2011)	2957
*	Male Population (2011)	22239
*	Female Population (2011)	20674
*	SC Population (2011)	4047
*	ST Population (2011)	1426
*	Localities in the ward:	KSSIDC Industrial Area, Wheel and Axle plant, Chowdeshwari Layout, Air Force Quarters, Yelahanka Satellite Town (Part), Yelahanka (Part), Kamakshiamma Layout
Boundary	North	By Storm Water Drain
Boundary	East	Railway Line (Yelahanka to Chikballapur line), Yelahanka Lake Limits (western), Tank bund Road (Existing Ward Boundary - 2009 delimitation), Main Road, (Existing Ward Boundary - 2009 delimitation), Majid Road, (Existing Ward Boundary - 2009 delimitation), Bazaar Road (Existing Ward Boundary - 2009 delimitation), Main Road, Cross Road, CMC Road, NES Main Road
Boundary	South	By Doddaballapura Road, Yelahanka New Town Main Road (Yeshwanthapura Road)
Boundary	West	Attur Road, 3rd Cross Road, Yelahanka 4th Phase Main (4th Main) Road, Shiva Mandir Road, 4th B Cross, KHB (6th Cross) Road, KHB Colony Road, Puttenahalli Main Road, Doddaballapura Road

== Demographics ==
Population Overview of Yelahanka Ward
Ward	Population	Census Year	Delimitation Year
Yelahanka	21866	2001	2009
Yelahanka	34783	2011	2009
Yelahanka	39368	2011	2020
Yelahanka	42913	2011	2023

== Elected representatives ==
Election Year	Ward Name	Name of Corporator	Party Affililiation	Reservation category
2010	Kempegowda	Y. N. Ashwath	Bharatiya Janata Party	Backward Category B
2015	Kempegowda	Chandramma Kempegowda	Bharatiya Janata Party	Backward Category A (Women)
2024				

== See also ==
- List of wards in Bangalore (2009-2023)
- List of wards in Bangalore
- 2010 Greater Bengaluru Municipal Corporation election
- 2015 Greater Bengaluru Municipal Corporation election
