= Zangalapalle railway station =

Railway station in Andhra Pradesh, India

Zangalapalle

General information
- Location: Zangalapalle, Andhra Pradesh; India
- Coordinates: 14°16′30″N 77°37′50″E
- Elevation: 372 metres (1,220.5 ft)
- System: Indian Railways station
- Owner: Indian Railways
- Operator: South Coast Railway
- Line: Guntakal–Bangalore section
- Platforms: 2

Construction
- Structure type: Standard on ground
- Parking: Yes
- Cycle facilities: No

Other information
- Status: Functioning
- Station code: ZPL
- Division(s): Guntakal
Location
- Location within Andhra Pradesh Location within India

Zangalapalle railway station is located in Anantapur district in the Indian state of Andhra Pradesh and serves Zangalapalle village in Anantapur district. It lies on Guntakal–Bangalore section. It halts 8 trains Everyday.

== History ==
The Guntakal–Bangalore line was opened in 1892–93. The metre-gauge Guntakal–Mysore Frontier Railway was opened in 1893. It was operated by Southern Mahrata Railway.

== Electrification ==
The Gooty-Bangalore railway line is fully electrified and commissioned on 14 July 2016.
