= Yelahanka Lake =

Lake in Karnataka, India

- Kasaba Amanikere
- Location within Karnataka Location within India Location within Asia
- Location: Yelahanka, Bengaluru, Karnataka, India
- Coordinates: 13°06′41″N 77°35′43″E
- Type: Perennial lake
- Primary inflows: Puttenahalli Lake
- Primary outflows: Jakkur Lake
- Built: ≈1904
- Max. length: 1.5 km (0.93 mi)
- Max. width: 600 m (2,000 ft)
- Surface area: 310 acres (130 ha)
- Max. depth: 6 m (20 ft)
- Surface elevation: 895 m (2,936 ft)
- Islands: 2

Yelahanka Lake and vicinity

Yelahanka Lake is a water body near Yelahanka, a suburb of Bangalore.

== Location ==
This lake located at Yelahanka and very near to Puttenahalli Lake which was rejuvenated to along with Yelahanka Lake in 2018.

== Rejuvenation ==
The lake was highly polluted and emanated foul smell because of discharge of industrial effluents and sewerage water & garbage. It had even contaminated the groundwater table. People living in the low-lying areas were forced to clear the drain water that had entered their house during continuous downpour in Yelahanka. The lake was overflowing threatening to flood the buildings nearby Rejuvenation was planned in 2010 when S. K. Nataraj (then Mayor) visited Allalsandra, Yelahanka and Atturu Lakes. A Necklace road connecting Yelahanka with the Airport road stretch at a cost of Rs 54 crore. A water fountain and a bird watching island in the centre of the lake, also a Toy train around the lake was planned at a cost of 60 crore. However rejuvenation was realised in 2019 at a cost of Rs 18 crore, a 6 km jogging track, sitout areas and many varieties of plants were put up. Bruhat Bengaluru Mahanagara Palike's (BBMP's) Yelahanka a musical fountain, gym facilities and sculptures around Yelahanka and Allasandra Lakes. The lake had received Rs 315 crore under Chief Minister's Nava Nagarothana scheme for taking up about 65 works pertaining to the lakes The water holding capacity of the lake has been increased by desilting, the groundwater table in the surrounding areas have improved and dependency on Cauvery water came down.

== Boat ride ==
Karnataka State Tourism Development Corporation (KSTDC) initiated boat ride at Yelahanka lake after the water body was handed over by Bruhat Bangalore Mahanagara Palike (BBMP) in 2019.

The Bruhat Bangalore Mahanagara Palike (BBMP) in association with private firms organized a massive plantation drive at the Yelahanka Lake with volunteers planting of thousand saplings. The drive is part of 'Wake the Lake' campaign which focuses on rejuvenating dying lakes. Palike officials said the initiative aims at sensitizing the community living around the lake and mobilize their efforts to revive the lake.

== Administration ==
This Lake is a part of Yelahanka Ward, Yelahanka Zone, Yelahanka division and Yelahanka sub-division
