= Puttenahalli Lake (Yelahanka) =

Lake in Yelahanka, India

Puttenahalli Lake Bird Sanctuary
- IUCN category IV (habitat/species management area)
- Interactive map of Puttenahalli Lake Bird Sanctuary
- Location: Yelahanka, India
- Nearest city: Bangalore
- Coordinates: 13°06′40″N 77°34′34″E
- Area: 10 ha (25 acres)
- Established: proposed, 2007
- Governing body: Karnataka Forest Department
- Website: Yelahanka Puttenahalli Lake and Bird Conservation Trust

Puttenahalli Lake and vicinity

Puttenahalli WS Lake also spelled as Puttanahalli Lake is a 10-hectare water body near Yelahanka, 14 km north of Bangalore.

This lake is not to be confused with another lake having similar name viz Puttenahalli lake, in J.P Nagar South Bangalore.

== Lake rejuvenation ==
Eight residents from the neighbourhood have started a trust called "Yelahanka Puttenahalli Lake and Bird Conservation Trust" to protect the birds and work towards increasing bio-diversity in the lake with the help of the government. The government and trust are working towards making the lake a bio-diversity spot and to declare the lake to be a bird reserve.

Yelahanka Lake (which is near Puttenahalli Lake): The Bruhat Bangalore Mahanagara Palike (BBMP) in association with private firms organized a massive plantation drive at the Yelahanka Lake with volunteers planting of thousand saplings. The drive is part of 'Wake the Lake' campaign which focuses on rejuvenating dying lakes. Palike officials said the initiative aims at sensitizing the community living around the lake and mobilize their efforts to revive the lake.

BBMP has tied up with the United Way of Bengaluru, a network partner of the 126-year-old US based charity-United Way Worldwide, for the purpose. The BBMP has drawn up a mandate clearing encroachments by demolishing as many as 15 buildings on the lake bed and recovering 7 acres and 13 guntas of land worth Rs 3 crores to plant a thousand saplings in an attempt to address this pressing issue of the 'Garden City'. Environmentalist Saalumarada Thimmakka was also a part of this initiative and encouraged the volunteers through her speech to participate in such causes. The eminent environmentalist recognized world over for her work in planting 284 banyan trees in the city and tending to them single handed was the guest of honor at the event. John Devaraj, a renowned art director, choreographed a puppet-o-thon with the students to put more enthusiasm for the drive.

== Lake habitat ==
=== Birds ===
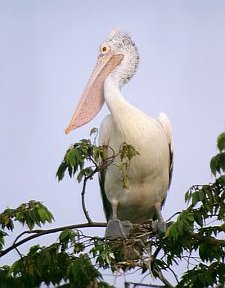
Spot-billed pelican Pelecanus philippensis

Biodiversity experts have discovered 49 species of birds breeding here. Among those birds are darters, painted storks, black-crowned night herons, purple herons, pond herons, egrets, Asian openbill storks, Eurasian spoonbills, spot-billed pelicans, little grebes, little cormorants, Indian spot-billed ducks, purple moorhens and common sandpipers.

== See also ==
- Lakes in Bangalore
- Puttenahalli Lake is also the name of a small rejuvenated lake (area: 13 acres 25 guntas) in Puttenahalli, Bangalore South. This lake is presently being maintained by Puttenahalli Neighbourhood Lake Improvement Trust.
