= 2010 Bruhat Bengaluru Mahanagara Palike election =

Indian local election

- 28 March 2010

198 of 198 seats in the Bruhat Bengaluru Mahanagara Palike 100 seats needed for a majority
- Registered: 69,77,008
- Turnout: 44.04% (▲0.67%)

| | Majority party | Minority party | Third party |
|---|---|---|---|
| Party | Bharatiya Janata Party | Indian National Congress | Janata Dal (Secular) |
| Seats won | 111 | 65 | 15 |
BMP majority before election
Council dissolved
Elected BBMP majority
BJP

The 2010 Bruhat Bengaluru Mahanagara Palike (Greater Bengaluru City Corporation) election was held on 4 April 2010 in all 198 Wards of Bangalore

== Background ==
The tenure of the Bangalore Mahanagara Palike ended on 6 November 2006. A new election was necessary to elect new Corporators and Mayor. On 6 November 2006, the BMP Council was dissolved by the State Government upon the completion of its five year term. In January 2007, the Karnataka Government issued a notification to merge the areas under then Bangalore Mahanagara Palike with seven City municipal council (CMC)'s, one Town municipal council (TMC) and 110 villages around the city to form a single administrative body, Bruhat Bengaluru Mahanagara Palike. The process was completed by April 2007 and the body was renamed Bruhat Bengaluru Mahanagara Palike (Greater Bengaluru City Corporation).

=== Organization ===
New Mayor will be elected for a term of one year and Corporators will be in office for 5 years

== Schedule ==
The schedule of the election was announced by the State Election Commission on 6 March 2010. It announced that polling would be held in a single phase on 28 March and that results would be declared on 5 April 2010. It also declared that the provisions of the Model Code of Conduct came into force with immediate effect" with the said announcement.

| Event | Date | Day |
| Date for Notification of Election | 8 March 2010 | Monday |
| Last date for filing nominations | 15 March 2010 | Monday |
| Date for scrutiny of nominations | 17 March 2010 | Wednesday |
| Last date for withdrawal of candidatures | 19 March 2010 | Friday |
| Date and Time of poll shall if necessary be taken | 28 March 2010 | Sunday (From 7:00 AM to 5:00 PM) |
| Date of Repoll wherever necessary | 4 April 2010 | Sunday (From 7:00 AM to 5:00 PM) |
| Date of counting | 5 April 2010 | Monday |
| Date before which the election shall be completed | 6 April 2010 | Tuesday |

== Candidates ==
| Ward number | Ward name | Reservation category | Assembly constituency | Lok Sabha constituency | Indian National Congress | Bharatiya Janata Party | Janata Dal (Secular) | Independent | Winner |
|---|---|---|---|---|---|---|---|---|---|
| 1 | Kempegowda Ward | Backward Category B | Yelahanka | Chikballapur | Rajkumar | Y Ashwath | N Harish | | Bharatiya Janata Party |
| 2 | Chowdeshwari Ward | Backward Category A (Women) | Yelahanka | Chikballapur | K Mallamma | K V Yashodha | Adilakshmi | | Bharatiya Janata Party |
| 3 | Attur | General (Women) | Yelahanka | Chikballapur | Renuka Gopalkrishna | Dr Geeta Shashikumar | BS Sudhjanvaakumari | | Bharatiya Janata Party |
| 4 | Yelahanka Satellite Town | Backward Category A | Yelahanka | Chikballapur | M Krishnamurthy | Muniraju M | BT Kadamaba | | Bharatiya Janata Party |
| 5 | Jakkur | General | Byatarayanapura | Bangalore North | T Venkatarama Reddy | Munindrakumar | JM Chandrappa | | Bharatiya Janata Party |
| 6 | Thanisandra | Backward Category A (Women) | Byatarayanapura | Bangalore North | Fahamidunnisa | Mamata Suresh | Lalitha Bai MukundaRao | | Janata Dal (Secular) |
| 7 | Byatarayanapura | Scheduled Tribe | Byatarayanapura | Bangalore North | Indira | Mangala Sridhar | Muniratnamma | | Indian National Congress |
| 8 | Kodigehalli | Backward Category B | Byatarayanapura | Bangalore North | Nataraj | Ashwathnarayan Gowda | H Ashwathnarayana | | Bharatiya Janata Party |
| 9 | Vidyaranyapura | General (Women) | Byatarayanapura | Bangalore North | Lakshmi Hari | Nandhini Srinivas | N Sarojamma | | Bharatiya Janata Party |
| 10 | Doddabommasandra | General | Byatarayanapura | Bangalore North | RL Vasudeva | Pillappa | C Srinivasamurthy | | Bharatiya Janata Party |
| 11 | Kuvempunagar | Backward Category A (Women) | Byatarayanapura | Bangalore North | Vijayakumari | Gangamma Mariswamy | Shobha V | Yashodamma R | Independent |
| 12 | Shettyhalli | Scheduled Caste (Women) | Dasarahalli | Bangalore North | Vijayalaxmi | Sharadanna | Prema | | Bharatiya Janata Party |
| 13 | Mallasandra | Backward Category A (Women) | Dasarahalli | Bangalore North | Nagaveni | RP Shashi | Bhagyamma Siddaraju | | Bharatiya Janata Party |
| 14 | Bagalagunte | General | Dasarahalli | Bangalore North | R Manjunath | BR Chandrashekar | G Chandrashekar | | Bharatiya Janata Party |
| 15 | T. Dasarahalli | General (Women) | Dasarahalli | Bangalore North | Sharadha | Puttama Thamanna | AV Sheela Jagadish | | Bharatiya Janata Party |
| 16 | Jalahalli | Scheduled Caste | Rajarajeshwarinagar | Bangalore Rural | R Narayanaswamy | Manjunath | N Shamanna | | Indian National Congress |
| 17 | J. P. Park | General | Rajarajeshwarinagar | Bangalore Rural | Ganga | BR Nanjundappa | D Shivanna | | Bharatiya Janata Party |
| 18 | Radhakrishna Temple | Backward Category A | Hebbal | Bangalore North | NM Giri | D Venkatesh | Keshava Murthy | | Bharatiya Janata Party |
| 19 | Sanjaynagar | Backward Category B | Hebbal | Bangalore North | Nagaraj | NM Krishnamurthy | Nanjappa | | Bharatiya Janata Party |
| 20 | Ganganagar | General | Hebbal | Bangalore North | V Rajanna | Anand V | Dr K Harish | | Bharatiya Janata Party |
| 21 | Hebbala | General | Hebbal | Bangalore North | Ramachandra | Jayappa Reddy | Rudrappa | | Bharatiya Janata Party |
| 22 | Vishwanathnagenahalli | Backward Category B | Hebbal | Bangalore North | Muniratnamma | Mamata Ravi | Annamarie F | | Indian National Congress |
| 23 | Nagavara | General (Women) | Sarvagnanagar | Bangalore Central | Irshad Begum | Kalpana Muninarayana | Uma | | Indian National Congress |
| 24 | HBR Layout | Backward Category A | Sarvagnanagar | Bangalore Central | Ravindra Prakash | Govindaraju | Pillaraju | | Bharatiya Janata Party |
| 25 | Horamavu | General (Women) | Krishnarajapuram | Bangalore North | Veena Ananda Reddy | Tejasvini Raju | Vijaya | | Bharatiya Janata Party |
| 26 | Ramamurthynagar | Backward Category A | Krishnarajapuram | Bangalore North | BS Suresh | A Revanna | R Krishnamurthy | | Bharatiya Janata Party |
| 27 | Banaswadi | General | Sarvagnanagar | Bangalore Central | Prabhakar Reddy | KodandaReddy | C Venkatachalapathy | | Bharatiya Janata Party |
| 28 | Kammanahalli | General | Sarvagnanagar | Bangalore Central | BNR Amaranath | MC Srinivas | Anthonyswamy | | Bharatiya Janata Party |
| 29 | Kacharakanahalli | General | Sarvagnanagar | Bangalore Central | KP Murthy | MN Reddy | Padmanabha Reddy | | Janata Dal (Secular) |
| 30 | Kadugondanahalli | General (Women) | Sarvagnanagar | Bangalore Central | Shaheen Taj | Veena Radha Krishna | Dilshad Begum | | Indian National Congress |
| 31 | Kushalnagar | General (Women) | Pulakeshinagar | Bangalore North | Noorjahan Sharif | Thangamani | Gowharjan | | Indian National Congress |
| 32 | Kavalbyrasandra | General | Pulakeshinagar | Bangalore North | Nethra Narayan | Gowramma | Ashwathamma | | Bharatiya Janata Party |
| 33 | Manorayanapalya | Backward Category A (Women) | Hebbal | Bangalore North | Fouzia Wazid | Durga V | Khammar Taj | | Indian National Congress |
| 34 | Gangenahalli | General | Hebbal | Bangalore North | Muniraju | M Nagaraju | VM Raju | | Bharatiya Janata Party |
| 35 | Aramanenagar | General | Malleshwaram | Bangalore North | Srinivas | Dr ShivPrasad | H Kalappa | | Bharatiya Janata Party |
| 36 | Mathikere | General | Malleshwaram | Bangalore North | Harish Bopanna | Muniswamy Gowda | Subhash BS | | Bharatiya Janata Party |
| 37 | Yeshwanthpura | General | Rajarajeshwarinagar | Bangalore Rural | Munirathana | BK Venkatesh | BR Manjunath | | Indian National Congress |
| 38 | H. M. T. | General (Women) | Rajarajeshwarinagar | Bangalore Rural | S Asha | Manju Manjunatha Babu | Neetu | | Indian National Congress |
| 39 | Chokkasandra | Backward Category A | Dasarahalli | Bangalore North | S Shivanna | CM Nagaraj | M Munishyamappa | | Janata Dal (Secular) |
| 40 | Dodda Bidarkallu | General (Women) | Yeshvanthapura | Bangalore North | Usha K | Kalpana Shivkumar | Gayathri JavareGowda | | Janata Dal (Secular) |
| 41 | Peenya Industrial Area | General | Dasarahalli | Bangalore North | G Rajanna | JV Srinivas | - | KL Thimmanajaiah | Independent |
| 42 | Lakshmidevinagar | Backward Category A | Rajarajeshwarinagar | Bangalore Rural | M Loganathan | Thimmaraju | C Hanumarangaiah | | Bharatiya Janata Party |
| 43 | Nandini Layout | Backward Category A | Mahalakshmi Layout | Bangalore North | M Nagaraju | KV Rajendra Kumar | P Thippeswamy | | Indian National Congress |
| 44 | Marappana Palya | General (Women) | Mahalakshmi Layout | Bangalore North | SD Jayamma | Kalavathi Nagaraj | Lakshmi | | Janata Dal (Secular) |
| 45 | Malleshwaram | Backward Category A | Malleshwaram | Bangalore North | N jayapal | V Srinivas | Lingaraju L | | Indian National Congress |
| 46 | Jayachamarajendranagar | General | Hebbal | Bangalore North | Govindaraju | Ganesh Rao Mane | V Ramanand | | Indian National Congress |
| 47 | Devarajeevanahalli | Scheduled Caste | Pulakeshinagar | Bangalore North | R Sampath Raj | Srinivas | Rajini Murthy | | Indian National Congress |
| 48 | Muneshwaranagar | Scheduled Caste | Pulakeshinagar | Bangalore North | R Manjula | Chitra | Shailaja S | | Janata Dal (Secular) |
| 49 | Lingarajapuram | General (Women) | Sarvagnanagar | Bangalore Central | Lavanya Ganesh | Sulochana Jaganath | Suguna Muniraju | | Indian National Congress |
| 50 | Benniganahalli | Scheduled Caste | C. V. Raman Nagar | Bangalore Central | UmaShankar | Dayanand | Rakesh Kumar | | Bharatiya Janata Party |
| 51 | Vijinapura | Scheduled Caste | Krishnarajapuram | Bangalore North | N Somesh | Sukumar | CM Muniraju | | Bharatiya Janata Party |
| 52 | Krishnarajapuram | General | Krishnarajapuram | Bangalore North | PJ Anthony Swamy | Veeranna | Rajkumar | | Bharatiya Janata Party |
| 53 | Basavanapura | General | Krishnarajapuram | Bangalore North | Poornima | BalaKrishna | Sunil Kumar | | Indian National Congress |
| 54 | Hoodi | Backward Category A | Mahadevapura | Bangalore Central | BA Basavaraj | AnandKumar | BS Sridhar | | Indian National Congress |
| 55 | Devasandra | Backward Category B | Krishnarajapuram | Bangalore North | Bharathi Reddy | Manjula Srinivas | Subbalakshmi K | | Bharatiya Janata Party |
| 56 | A. Narayanapura | Backward Category A | Krishnarajapuram | Bangalore North | DA Gopal | Prasad | HS Amanullah | | Bharatiya Janata Party |
| 57 | C. V. Raman Nagar | Backward Category A | C. V. Raman Nagar | Bangalore Central | Ramachandra | M Krishna | V Shamanna | | Bharatiya Janata Party |
| 58 | Hosathippasandra | General (Women) | C. V. Raman Nagar | Bangalore Central | Shilpa S | Sumitra Vijaykumar | Manjula Devraj | | Bharatiya Janata Party |
| 59 | Maruthisevanagar | Scheduled Caste | Sarvagnanagar | Bangalore Central | Rajendran | Venkatesh | K Ramesh Babu | | Indian National Congress |
| 60 | Sagayarapuram | Scheduled Caste | Pulakeshinagar | Bangalore North | Palaniamma | Muniswamy | Marimuthu | | Indian National Congress |
| 61 | S. K. Garden | Scheduled Caste | Pulakeshinagar | Bangalore North | Devika Rani | Usha Mahesh | Manjula | | Indian National Congress |
| 62 | Ramaswamypalya | Scheduled Caste | Shivajinagar | Bangalore Central | Chandra | Jayareem | O Gundlappa | | Indian National Congress |
| 63 | Jayamahal | General | Shivajinagar | Bangalore Central | MK Gunasekhar | SuryaKanth Rao | Mohammed Iqbal | | Indian National Congress |
| 64 | Rajamahal | General (Women) | Malleshwaram | Bangalore North | Uma Bai | M Vijayakumar | R Lakshmi | | Bharatiya Janata Party |
| 65 | Kadumalleshwara | Backward Category A | Malleshwaram | Bangalore North | Krishna raju | Manjunath Raju | Rajeev BK | | Bharatiya Janata Party |
| 66 | Subrahmanyanagar | General (Women) | Malleshwaram | Bangalore North | R Meena | Shashi kala KrishneGowda | B Lalitha | | Bharatiya Janata Party |
| 67 | Nagapura | Backward Category A | Mahalakshmi Layout | Bangalore North | ML Ravishankar | Harish | Arun Kumar | | Bharatiya Janata Party |
| 68 | Mahalakshmipuram | Backward Category B | Mahalakshmi Layout | Bangalore North | Keshavamurthy | Shivanandamurthy | BhadreGowda B | | Indian National Congress |
| 69 | Laggere | General | Rajarajeshwarinagar | Bangalore Rural | L Shivanna | Lakshmikanth Reddy | Narayanaswami | | Bharatiya Janata Party |
| 70 | Rajagopalanagar | General | Dasarahalli | Bangalore North | K Nagabhushan | HN Gangadhar | N Narsimhamurthy | | Bharatiya Janata Party |
| 71 | Hegganahalli | General | Dasarahalli | Bangalore North | S Manjunath | HR Prakash | Krishnaiah | Govinde Gowda | Independent |
| 72 | Herohalli | Backward Category B | Yeshvanthapura | Bangalore North | B Gowramma | Anantha Raju | Hanumantha Gowda | | Janata Dal (Secular) |
| 73 | Kottigepalya | General | Rajarajeshwarinagar | Bangalore Rural | Honnagiri Gowda | Venkatesh Babu | Ravi Gowda | | Bharatiya Janata Party |
| 74 | Shakthiganapathinagar | General (Women) | Mahalakshmi Layout | Bangalore North | Narasamma | Roopa Puttaraj | Padmavathi Srinivas | | Janata Dal (Secular) |
| 75 | Shankara Matha | General | Mahalakshmi Layout | Bangalore North | M Shivraj | Jayasimha | BK Gopal | | Indian National Congress |
| 76 | Gayathrinagar | General (Women) | Malleshwaram | Bangalore North | Chandrakala | Chethana Gowda | CR Shobha | | Bharatiya Janata Party |
| 77 | Dattathreya Temple | General | Gandhi Nagar | Bangalore Central | RS Sathyanarayana | S Prakash | Anil Kumar | | Indian National Congress |
| 78 | Pulakeshinagar | General | Pulakeshinagar | Bangalore North | Abdul Jakeer | Sardar Surana | Anthony Selvam | | Indian National Congress |
| 79 | Sarvagnanagar | Scheduled Caste | C. V. Raman Nagar | Bangalore Central | Selvi | Bhuvaneshwari Tulsiram | P Vidyakumari | | Bharatiya Janata Party |
| 80 | Hoysalanagar | Scheduled Caste | C. V. Raman Nagar | Bangalore Central | G Amudha Gopichander | Savitha Ramesh | TM Navaneethamma | | Bharatiya Janata Party |
| 81 | Vignananagar | General (Women) | Krishnarajapuram | Bangalore North | D Surekha | Geeth Vivekanada Babu | N Prema Sriram | | Bharatiya Janata Party |
| 82 | Garudacharpalya | General | Mahadevapura | Bangalore Central | Pillappa N | Kiran Babu BK | C Nagaraju | | Indian National Congress |
| 83 | Kadugudi | General | Mahadevapura | Bangalore Central | Anjaneya Reddy | Ashwathanarayan Reddy | KP Shivshankar | | Indian National Congress |
| 84 | Hagadooru | Backward Category B | Mahadevapura | Bangalore Central | HV Srinivas | HK Narayana Swamy | M Narayana Reddy | | Indian National Congress |
| 85 | Doddanekkundi | General | Mahadevapura | Bangalore Central | K Vasudev Reddy | Sridhar | HR Suresh | | Bharatiya Janata Party |
| 86 | Marathahalli | Backward Category A (Women) | Mahadevapura | Bangalore Central | J Varalakshmi | DR Annapurna Lokesh | N Kalavathi | | Indian National Congress |
| 87 | HAL Airport | General | Krishnarajapuram | Bangalore North | Syed Hussain | Siddalingaiah | L Jayaram | | Bharatiya Janata Party |
| 88 | Jeevanabima Nagar | Scheduled Caste | C. V. Raman Nagar | Bangalore Central | KV Gautham | K Chandrasekhar | Suresh | | Bharatiya Janata Party |
| 89 | Jogupalya | General | Shanthinagar | Bangalore Central | Rubim Moses | Gautham | GK Muralidhara | | Bharatiya Janata Party |
| 90 | Ulsoor | Scheduled Caste | Shivajinagar | Bangalore Central | Uday Kumar | Chandrashekhar | Someshwaran R | | Indian National Congress |
| 91 | Bharathinagar | General | Shivajinagar | Bangalore Central | Shakeel Ahmed | Rudramurthy | M Ramamurthy | | Indian National Congress |
| 92 | Shivajinagar | General (Women) | Shivajinagar | Bangalore Central | Naheema Begum | Farida | Nazreena Mujib | Farida I | Independent |
| 93 | Vasanthnagar | General | Shivajinagar | Bangalore Central | BR Naidu | Katta Jagish | R Mallikarjuna | | Bharatiya Janata Party |
| 94 | Gandhinagar | General | Gandhi Nagar | Bangalore Central | Nataraj S | Ramachandra | R Murugan | | Indian National Congress |
| 95 | Subhashnagar | Scheduled Caste | Gandhi Nagar | Bangalore Central | T Mallesh | SP Subramanyam | BR Udaykumar | | Indian National Congress |
| 96 | Okalipuram | Scheduled Caste | Gandhi Nagar | Bangalore Central | S Queen Elizabeth | Sharmila | Mohanavalli | | Indian National Congress |
| 97 | Dayanandanagar | Scheduled Caste | Rajaji Nagar | Bangalore Central | Shakeela Muniraj | Vanitha Lokesh | D Shashikala | | Indian National Congress |
| 98 | Prakashnagar | General | Rajaji Nagar | Bangalore Central | G Padamavathi | Ravindra | S Ganesh | | Bharatiya Janata Party |
| 99 | Rajajinagar | Backward Category A | Rajaji Nagar | Bangalore Central | S Kiran Kumar | Krishnappa | Suresh BT | | Bharatiya Janata Party |
| 100 | Basaveshwaranagar | Backward Category A | Rajaji Nagar | Bangalore Central | Mangala Raju | H Padmaraj | Asha Devi | | Bharatiya Janata Party |
| 101 | Kamakshipalya | General | Rajaji Nagar | Bangalore Central | RadhaKrishna | Rangamma | R Jayakumar | | Bharatiya Janata Party |
| 102 | Vrishabhavathi | Backward Category A (Women) | Mahalakshmi Layout | Bangalore North | Dr R Janaki | Vijayalakshmi | L Nagarathna | | Janata Dal (Secular) |
| 103 | Kaveripura | General | Govindraj Nagar | Bangalore South | G Krishnappa | Manjunath NB | R Prakash | | Janata Dal (Secular) |
| 104 | Govindarajanagar | Backward Category A | Govindraj Nagar | Bangalore South | G Ramachandra | Mohan Kumar | D Umashankar | | Bharatiya Janata Party |
| 105 | Agrahara Dasarahalli | Backward Category A (Women) | Govindraj Nagar | Bangalore South | Shanthakumari | Roopa Devi | SV Prabhavathi | | Bharatiya Janata Party |
| 106 | Dr. Rajkumar | General | Govindraj Nagar | Bangalore South | H Ramesh | GangaBhairaiah | Raghu AR | | Bharatiya Janata Party |
| 107 | Shivanagar | General | Rajaji Nagar | Bangalore Central | H Ramakrishnaiah | Manjunath | Mr Shashikumar | | Bharatiya Janata Party |
| 108 | Srirama Mandir | Backward Category A (Women) | Rajaji Nagar | Bangalore Central | Hemalatha | MG Jayarathna | Krishnaveni | | Bharatiya Janata Party |
| 109 | Chickpete | General | Gandhi Nagar | Bangalore Central | BS Vishwanath | Al Shivakumar | V HariPrasad | | Bharatiya Janata Party |
| 110 | Sampangiramanagar | Backward Category A | Shivajinagar | Bangalore Central | G Shekhar | Gopi M | K VijayaLakshmi | | Bharatiya Janata Party |
| 111 | Shanthalanagar | Backward Category A | Shanthinagar | Bangalore Central | Salam Outbridge | Ramesh Yadav | Abdul Karim | Shiv Kumar | Independent |
| 112 | Domlur | General (Women) | Shanthinagar | Bangalore Central | Rajaakshmi | Geetha Srinivas Reddy | HN Suguna | | Bharatiya Janata Party |
| 113 | Konena Agrahara | General | C. V. Raman Nagar | Bangalore Central | Ekambarish Reddy | Chandrappa Reddy | Jagadish Chandra M | | Bharatiya Janata Party |
| 114 | Agaram | Scheduled Caste | Shanthinagar | Bangalore Central | Sarala | Sridevi | Gayathri L | | Indian National Congress |
| 115 | Vannarpet | Scheduled Caste | Shanthinagar | Bangalore Central | Vijayan S | Raju | MS Nandakumar | | Indian National Congress |
| 116 | Neelasandra | Scheduled Tribe | Shanthinagar | Bangalore Central | Lokesh | KV Nagendra | C Lakshmi Balakrishna | | Indian National Congress |
| 117 | Shanthinagar | General (Women) | Shanthinagar | Bangalore Central | Soumya | Nagarathana Nagaraj | Jayanthi G | | Indian National Congress |
| 118 | Sudhamanagar | Scheduled Caste | Chickpet | Bangalore South | Avvay | Surendra | M Subramani | | Indian National Congress |
| 119 | Dharmarayaswamy Temple | Backward Category A | Chickpet | Bangalore South | TV Prabhu | P Dhanraj | M Ramakrishna | | Bharatiya Janata Party |
| 120 | Cottonpet | Backward Category A (Women) | Gandhi Nagar | Bangalore Central | Vandana | Vasanth Kumari | Uma | | Bharatiya Janata Party |
| 121 | Binnipete | Backward Category A (Women) | Gandhi Nagar | Bangalore Central | SriVidya | R Vimala | Komathi Devaraj | | Indian National Congress |
| 122 | Kempapura Agrahara | Backward Category A (Women) | Vijay Nagar | Bangalore South | Nirmala | Geetha | K Bharathi | | Indian National Congress |
| 123 | Vijaynagar | General | Vijay Nagar | Bangalore South | Nagaraj BTS | Ravindra H | N Vasudev | | Bharatiya Janata Party |
| 124 | Hosahalli | Backward Category A | Vijay Nagar | Bangalore South | Jayaram H | Dr S Raju | MP Bhaskar | | Bharatiya Janata Party |
| 125 | Marenahalli | Backward Category A (Women) | Govindraj Nagar | Bangalore South | Lalitha Ramappa | Shakuntala | Mangala Gowramma | | Bharatiya Janata Party |
| 126 | Maruthi Mandira | General | Govindraj Nagar | Bangalore South | Siddharatha | Vagish Prasad | Nagendra Prasad | | Bharatiya Janata Party |
| 127 | Moodalapalya | Backward Category A (Women) | Govindraj Nagar | Bangalore South | M Geetha | Shanthakumari | Prema Bai | | Bharatiya Janata Party |
| 128 | Nagarabhavi | General | Govindraj Nagar | Bangalore South | Lakshman Gowda | Umesh Shetty K | D Muniraju | | Bharatiya Janata Party |
| 129 | Jnanabharathi | Backward Category B | Rajarajeshwarinagar | Bangalore Rural | Govindaraju | Manjunath | Krishnamurthy V | | Indian National Congress |
| 130 | Ullalu | Backward Category A | Yeshvanthapura | Bangalore North | D Rajanna | Nagaraj | Sathyanarayan | | Indian National Congress |
| 131 | Nayandahalli | General (Women) | Govindraj Nagar | Bangalore South | Shashi Balaraj Gowda | Rajeshwari | Vijaya D Muniraju | | Bharatiya Janata Party |
| 132 | Attiguppe | General | Vijay Nagar | Bangalore South | K Doddanna | Venkatesh | BR Prakash | | Indian National Congress |
| 133 | Hampinagar | General | Vijay Nagar | Bangalore South | Srinath S | Chandrasekharaiah | A DeveGowda | | Bharatiya Janata Party |
| 134 | Bapujinagar | Backward Category A | Vijay Nagar | Bangalore South | Abdul Mallik Beig | V Krishna | Imran Pasha | | Bharatiya Janata Party |
| 135 | Padarayanapura | General (Women) | Chamrajpet | Bangalore Central | Tahira Begum | Noorunissa | Zarina Begum | Nazni Begum | Independent |
| 136 | Jagjivanram Nagar | General (Women) | Chamrajpet | Bangalore Central | Seema Khanum | Naveed Banu | BT John | | Indian National Congress |
| 137 | Rayapuram | Scheduled Caste | Chamrajpet | Bangalore Central | M Lakshminarayan | MN Srirama | CS Radhakrishna | | Janata Dal (Secular) |
| 138 | Chalavadipalya | Scheduled Caste | Chamrajpet | Bangalore Central | D Srinivasan | Rekha Kadiresh | R Suri | | Bharatiya Janata Party |
| 139 | Krishnarajendra Market | Scheduled Caste | Chamrajpet | Bangalore Central | Sampanigiraj | Swaaroopa | Ashwath | | Janata Dal (Secular) |
| 140 | Chamarajapet | Backward Category A | Chamrajpet | Bangalore Central | BS Vijaykumar | BV Ganesh | M Shivakumar | | Bharatiya Janata Party |
| 141 | Azadnagar | General (Women) | Chamrajpet | Bangalore Central | Gowramma | Shylaja Srinivas Murthy | Mustam Begum | | Indian National Congress |
| 142 | Sunkenahalli | General | Chickpet | Bangalore South | KiranKumar BS | PN Sadashiva | S Ramesh | | Bharatiya Janata Party |
| 143 | Visvesvarapuram | General | Chickpet | Bangalore South | PR Ramesh | Anil Kumar | Latha Sukumar | | Bharatiya Janata Party |
| 144 | Siddapura | General | Chickpet | Bangalore South | Uday Shankar | Vedavyasa Bhatt | Sardar Pasha | | Indian National Congress |
| 145 | Hombegowdanagar | General | Chickpet | Bangalore South | Imtiyaz Pasha | Sadashivaiah BC | MZ Ali | D Chandrappa | Independent |
| 146 | Lakkasandra | General | B.T.M Layout | Bangalore South | TM Venkataswamy | Mahesh Babu | Waris Pasha | | Bharatiya Janata Party |
| 147 | Adugodi | General | B.T.M Layout | Bangalore South | Murugesh | Mohan | Sumathi | | Indian National Congress |
| 148 | Ejipura | General (Women) | B.T.M Layout | Bangalore South | PM Saroja | Lakshmi Gundappa | Jayashree | | Indian National Congress |
| 149 | Varthur | General | Mahadevapura | Bangalore Central | Uday kumar | Raja Reddy | K Anandra Reddy | | Indian National Congress |
| 150 | Bellandur | Backward Category B | Mahadevapura | Bangalore Central | Babu Reddy | Jagannatha | Mahesh P | | Indian National Congress |
| 151 | Koramangala | Backward Category A (Women) | B.T.M Layout | Bangalore South | Kokila BN | Bhagyamma | Florence | | Indian National Congress |
| 152 | Suddaguntepalya | General | B.T.M Layout | Bangalore South | CR Gopal | Manjunath | HE Krishnappa | | Bharatiya Janata Party |
| 153 | Jayanagar | General (Women) | Chickpet | Bangalore South | Gangambike | Bhagaya Amaresh | ShahTaj Khanam | | Indian National Congress |
| 154 | Basavanagudi | General | Basavanagudi | Bangalore South | GR Murali | Katte Sathyanarayana | SV Jnanesh | | Bharatiya Janata Party |
| 155 | Hanumanthanagar | General | Basavanagudi | Bangalore South | K Chandrashekar | Jagadeesh | PVS Prasad | | Indian National Congress |
| 156 | Srinagar | General | Basavanagudi | Bangalore South | KG Manjunath | C Mayanna Gowda | T ThimmeGowda | | Janata Dal (Secular) |
| 157 | Gali Anjaneya Temple | General | Vijay Nagar | Bangalore South | Avalahalli Chandrappa | Anand | Geetha Shankar | | Bharatiya Janata Party |
| 158 | Deepanjalinagar | Backward Category A (Women) | Vijay Nagar | Bangalore South | Ningarajamma | Malathi Venkataswamy | - | | Bharatiya Janata Party |
| 159 | Kengeri | General | Yeshvanthapura | Bangalore North | L Nagaraj | Anjanappa | - | | Bharatiya Janata Party |
| 160 | Rajarajeshwarinagar | General | Rajarajeshwarinagar | Bangalore Rural | M Rajkumar | Ramchandra | V GovindRaju | | Bharatiya Janata Party |
| 161 | Hosakerehalli | General | Padmanabhanagar | Bangalore South | KempeGowda HA | Narayana | Narayanaswami | | Bharatiya Janata Party |
| 162 | Girinagar | General (Women) | Basavanagudi | Bangalore South | Kokila Murthy | Latha Vijaykumar | Shantala MS | | Bharatiya Janata Party |
| 163 | Kathriguppe | Backward Category A | Basavanagudi | Bangalore South | Lingaraju | Venkatesh Murthy | Mukunda | | Bharatiya Janata Party |
| 164 | Vidyapeetha | Backward Category A | Basavanagudi | Bangalore South | G Nagaraj | M Venkatesh | R Chandrakant | | Bharatiya Janata Party |
| 165 | Ganesh Mandira | Backward Category A | Padmanabhanagar | Bangalore South | L Govinda Raj | AH Basavaraju | - | | Indian National Congress |
| 166 | Karisandra | General (Women) | Padmanabhanagar | Bangalore South | Jyothi S Reddy | Gayathri Venkatesh | Mumtaz | | Indian National Congress |
| 167 | Yediyur | Backward Category A | Padmanabhanagar | Bangalore South | Shamanna | NR Ramesh | Lakshmikanth | | Bharatiya Janata Party |
| 168 | Pattabhiramnagar | General | Jayanagar | Bangalore South | TS Kamal Kumar | C. K. Ramamurthy | Usha Srinivas Gowda | | Bharatiya Janata Party |
| 169 | Byrasandra | Backward Category A | Jayanagar | Bangalore South | Joseph M | N Nagaraj | A Mohammed Rasool | | Bharatiya Janata Party |
| 170 | Jayanagar East | Backward Category A | Jayanagar | Bangalore South | Munisanjeevaiah | N Lakshmikanth | Samiullah | | Indian National Congress |
| 171 | Gurappanapalya | General | Jayanagar | Bangalore South | Mohammed Rizwan | Tafasullah Ahmed | Shakibullah Khan | | Indian National Congress |
| 172 | Madiwala | General | B.T.M Layout | Bangalore South | BN Manjunath Reddy | Gopal Reddy | RamaKrishna Reddy | | Indian National Congress |
| 173 | Jakkasandra | General (Women) | B.T.M Layout | Bangalore South | N Sunitha | Saraswathamma | Shilpa Keshav Gowda | | Bharatiya Janata Party |
| 174 | HSR Layout | General (Women) | Bommanahalli | Bangalore South | Prof Amaravathi | Latha Narasimha Murthy | - | | Bharatiya Janata Party |
| 175 | Bommanahalli | General | Bommanahalli | Bangalore South | Papaiah Reddy | Manjunath Reddy | Murugesh L | | Bharatiya Janata Party |
| 176 | BTM Layout | General | B.T.M Layout | Bangalore South | GNR Babu | HK Muthappa | T Dayananda | | Indian National Congress |
| 177 | J. P. Nagar | Backward Category A | Jayanagar | Bangalore South | Prakash Kumar | Chandrasekhar raju | Deshi Venkatesh | | Bharatiya Janata Party |
| 178 | Sarakki | General | Jayanagar | Bangalore South | R Arun Kumar | SK Nataraj | Swarnalatha | | Bharatiya Janata Party |
| 179 | Shakambarinagar | Backward Category A | Jayanagar | Bangalore South | Chandrashekar Raju | B Somashekar | Srinivas | | Bharatiya Janata Party |
| 180 | Banashankari Temple | General | Padmanabhanagar | Bangalore South | Mohammed Ayub | M G Rajanna | Diwan Ali | | Janata Dal (Secular) |
| 181 | Kumaraswamy Layout | Backward Category A | Padmanabhanagar | Bangalore South | S Harish | S Suresh | Munithimanna | | Bharatiya Janata Party |
| 182 | Padmanabhanagar | General | Padmanabhanagar | Bangalore South | HS Murali | L Srinivas | M Anjanappa | | Bharatiya Janata Party |
| 183 | Chikkalasandra | General | Padmanabhanagar | Bangalore South | Pramod Kumar | BS Venkataswamy Naidu | R Muniraju | | Bharatiya Janata Party |
| 184 | Uttarahalli | Backward Category A | Bangalore South | Bangalore Rural | Shiva kumar | Ramesh Raju | Shobha Jayaram | | Bharatiya Janata Party |
| 185 | Yelachenahalli | Backward Category A | Bangalore South | Bangalore Rural | O Manjunath | Balaji Singh | CB Nagaraju | | Indian National Congress |
| 186 | Jaraganahalli | General (Women) | Bommanahalli | Bangalore South | Sujatha | Suguna Balakrishan | Savithri Krishna Reddy | | Bharatiya Janata Party |
| 187 | Puttenahalli | Backward Category A | Bommanahalli | Bangalore South | KS Dushyant | L Ramesh | N Srinivas | | Bharatiya Janata Party |
| 188 | Bilekahalli | General (Women) | Bommanahalli | Bangalore South | BV Madhu | Roopa | Manjua | | Bharatiya Janata Party |
| 189 | Hongasandra | Backward Category B | Bommanahalli | Bangalore South | R Padma | Sukanda Ramachandra Reddy | Anu Shree Devi | | Bharatiya Janata Party |
| 190 | Mangammanapalya | Backward Category A (Women) | Bommanahalli | Bangalore South | Reshma | Sayed Hasina Taj | Chandrika Mallesh | | Bharatiya Janata Party |
| 191 | Singasandra | General (Women) | Bangalore South | Bangalore Rural | Kavitha Raj | Rani Srinivas Reddy | Usha | | Indian National Congress |
| 192 | Begur | Backward Category B | Bangalore South | Bangalore Rural | - | Nagaraj | M Srinivas | | Janata Dal (Secular) |
| 193 | Arakere | General | Bommanahalli | Bangalore South | C Krishnareddy | Purushottam | - | | Bharatiya Janata Party |
| 194 | Gottigere | Backward Category B | Bangalore South | Bangalore Rural | Pushpa SK | J Shantha | Bhagyamma | | Indian National Congress |
| 195 | Konanakunte | General (Women) | Bangalore South | Bangalore Rural | Rajeshwari Krishna | ShashiRekha Jayaram | Chenamma Subbanna | | Bharatiya Janata Party |
| 196 | Anjanapura | General | Bangalore South | Bangalore Rural | Gangadhar | Munniraju | Zulfikar Ahmed Khan | | Indian National Congress |
| 197 | Vasanthapura | General (Women) | Bangalore South | Bangalore Rural | Shobha | Vijaya Ramesh | Bhagyamma Devraj | | Bharatiya Janata Party |
| 198 | Hemmigepura | Backward Category A (Women) | Yeshvanthapura | Bangalore North | Pushpa | Veena Nagaraj | Nagamma P | | Bharatiya Janata Party |

== Results ==
=== List of successful candidates ===
| Ward No. | Ward Name | Reservation category | Winner | Party | Assembly Constituency | Lok Sabha Constituency | Area (km²) | Household (HH) - 2011 | Population | | Popn density | | Popn growth rate (%) 2001 - 2011 | HH growth rate (%) 2001 - 2011 |
| Ward No. | Ward Name | Reservation category | Winner | Party | Assembly Constituency | Lok Sabha Constituency | Area (km²) | Household (HH) - 2011 | 2001 | 2011 | 2001 | 2011 | Popn growth rate (%) 2001 - 2011 | HH growth rate (%) 2001 - 2011 |
|---|---|---|---|---|---|---|---|---|---|---|---|---|---|---|
| 1 | Kempegowda Ward | Backward Category B | Y.N Ashwath | Bharatiya Janata Party | Yelahanka | Chikballapur | 10.9 | 8647 | 21866 | 34783 | 2006 | 3182 | 59.10 | 72.60 |
| 2 | Chowdeshwari Ward | Backward Category A (Women) | K.V. Yashoda | Bharatiya Janata Party | Yelahanka | Chikballapur | 6.5 | 9506 | 19626 | 36602 | 3019 | 5635 | 86.50 | 111.00 |
| 3 | Attur | General (Women) | K.N Geetha ShashiKumar | Bharatiya Janata Party | Yelahanka | Chikballapur | 8.8 | 14605 | 24020 | 58129 | 2729 | 6606 | 142.00 | 171.3 |
| 4 | Yelahanka Satellite Town | Backward Category A | M. Muniraju | Bharatiya Janata Party | Yelahanka | Chikballapur | 4.6 | 10583 | 25782 | 41986 | 5604 | 9224 | 62.90 | 70.30 |
| 5 | Jakkur | General | K.A. Muneedra Kumar | Bharatiya Janata Party | Byatarayanapura | Bangalore North | 23.5 | 12387 | 20964 | 52025 | 892 | 2215 | 148.20 | 168.80 |
| 6 | Thanisandra | Backward Category A (Women) | Lalitha | Janata Dal (Secular) | Byatarayanapura | Bangalore North | 10.0 | 16470 | 20402 | 71855 | 2040 | 7161 | 252.20 | 301.90 |
| 7 | Byatarayanapura | Scheduled Tribe | Indira | Indian National Congress | Byatarayanapura | Bangalore North | 10.0 | 18691 | 31400 | 72154 | 3140 | 7198 | 129.80 | 151.30 |
| 8 | Kodigehalli | Backward Category B | Ashwath Narayan Gowda | Bharatiya Janata Party | Byatarayanapura | Bangalore North | 3.8 | 12036 | 21635 | 47546 | 5693 | 12369 | 119.80 | 134.50 |
| 9 | Vidyaranyapura | General (Women) | K. Nandini | Bharatiya Janata Party | Byatarayanapura | Bangalore North | 9.9 | 14448 | 23136 | 57195 | 2337 | 5753 | 147.20 | 165.50 |
| 10 | Doddabommasandra | General | M.E. Pillappa | Bharatiya Janata Party | Byatarayanapura | Bangalore North | 4.2 | 8379 | 21640 | 36396 | 5152 | 8673 | 68.20 | 66.60 |
| 11 | Kuvempunagar | Backward Category A (Women) | K.R. Yashodamma | Independent | Byatarayanapura | Bangalore North | 7.1 | 8519 | 25295 | 37128 | 3563 | 5207 | 46.80 | 53.20 |
| 12 | Shettyhalli | Scheduled Caste (Women) | Sharadamma | Bharatiya Janata Party | Dasarahalli | Bangalore North | 8.1 | 15530 | 28309 | 61071 | 3495 | 7521 | 115.70 | 131.10 |
| 13 | Mallasandra | Backward Category A (Women) | R.P Shashi | Bharatiya Janata Party | Dasarahalli | Bangalore North | 1.3 | 11221 | 26253 | 41482 | 20195 | 31753 | 58.00 | 93.20 |
| 14 | Bagalagunte | General | B.R Chandrashekar | Bharatiya Janata Party | Dasarahalli | Bangalore North | 4.3 | 17117 | 28306 | 65113 | 6583 | 15203 | 130.00 | 137.00 |
| 15 | T. Dasarahalli | General (Women) | Puttamma | Bharatiya Janata Party | Dasarahalli | Bangalore North | 0.9 | 8849 | 26050 | 33042 | 28944 | 37474 | 26.80 | 32.10 |
| 16 | Jalahalli | Scheduled Caste | R. Narayana Swamy | Indian National Congress | Rajarajeshwarinagar | Bangalore Rural | 5.2 | 9191 | 29037 | 37959 | 5584 | 7354 | 90.70 | 37.30 |
| 17 | J. P. Park | General | B.R. Nanjundappa | Bharatiya Janata Party | Rajarajeshwarinagar | Bangalore Rural | 2.0 | 12553 | 35174 | 49610 | 17587 | 24203 | 41.00 | 54.10 |
| 18 | Radhakrishna Temple | Backward Category A | D. Venkatesha | Bharatiya Janata Party | Hebbal | Bangalore North | 1.9 | 9058 | 26211 | 35122 | 13795 | 18014 | 36.30 | 48.20 |
| 19 | Sanjaynagar | Backward Category B | N.M Krishnamurthy | Bharatiya Janata Party | Hebbal | Bangalore North | 1.5 | 8153 | 24178 | 32491 | 16119 | 21096 | 34.40 | 45.10 |
| 20 | Ganganagar | General | V. Anand | Bharatiya Janata Party | Hebbal | Bangalore North | 2.3 | 6592 | 26256 | 27361 | 11416 | 12096 | 34.40 | 45.10 |
| 21 | Hebbala | General | C.R. Jayappa Reddy | Bharatiya Janata Party | Hebbal | Bangalore North | 1.2 | 8181 | 24161 | 32516 | 20134 | 26455 | 34.60 | 43.40 |
| 22 | Vishwanathnagenahalli | Backward Category B | Munirathnamma | Indian National Congress | Hebbal | Bangalore North | 1.5 | 12704 | 25697 | 51592 | 17131 | 34772 | 100.80 | 117.60 |
| 23 | Nagavara | General (Women) | Irshaad Begum | Indian National Congress | Sarvagnanagar | Bangalore Central | 2.1 | 12295 | 35264 | 60483 | 16792 | 29205 | 71.50 | 89.50 |
| 24 | HBR Layout | Backward Category A | B Govindaraju | Bharatiya Janata Party | Sarvagnanagar | Bangalore Central | 4.6 | 13612 | 32156 | 58967 | 6990 | 12717 | 83.40 | 108.00 |
| 25 | Horamavu | General (Women) | Tejaswini N Raju | Bharatiya Janata Party | Krishnarajapuram | Bangalore North | 17.5 | 23999 | 28167 | 95368 | 1610 | 5437 | 238.60 | 288.00 |
| 26 | Ramamurthynagar | Backward Category A | M Revanna | Bharatiya Janata Party | Krishnarajapuram | Bangalore North | 7.3 | 11674 | 21999 | 47358 | 3013 | 6523 | 115.30 | 143.50 |
| 27 | Banaswadi | General | A. Kodanda Reddy | Bharatiya Janata Party | Sarvagnanagar | Bangalore Central | 3.4 | 12922 | 31998 | 51268 | 9411 | 14940 | 60.20 | 75.60 |
| 28 | Kammanahalli | General | M.C. Srinivas | Bharatiya Janata Party | Sarvagnanagar | Bangalore Central | 1.0 | 11479 | 34819 | 47074 | 34819 | 45494 | 35.20 | 46.30 |
| 29 | Kacharakanahalli | General | Padmanabh Reddy | Janata Dal (Secular) | Sarvagnanagar | Bangalore Central | 1.7 | 8700 | 29018 | 33588 | 17069 | 19916 | 15.70 | 28.40 |
| 30 | Kadugondanahalli | General (Women) | Shaheen Taj | Indian National Congress | Sarvagnanagar | Bangalore Central | 0.7 | 9758 | 34842 | 45748 | 49774 | 65514 | 31.30 | 49.70 |
| 31 | Kushalnagar | General (Women) | Noor Jahaan | Indian National Congress | Pulakeshinagar | Bangalore North | 0.6 | 8192 | 34046 | 41936 | 56743 | 65065 | 23.20 | 35.20 |
| 32 | Kavalbyrasandra | General | Y.R. Gowramma | Bharatiya Janata Party | Pulakeshinagar | Bangalore North | 1.6 | 9540 | 26550 | 39334 | 16594 | 24771 | 48.20 | 56.80 |
| 33 | Manorayanapalya | Backward Category A (Women) | Foujiya Begum | Indian National Congress | Hebbal | Bangalore North | 0.8 | 10572 | 34777 | 47926 | 43471 | 59123 | 37.80 | 48.48 |
| 34 | Gangenahalli | General | M. Nagaraja | Bharatiya Janata Party | Hebbal | Bangalore North | 1.1 | 6058 | 24954 | 24308 | 22685 | 22226 | -2.60 | 3.90 |
| 35 | Aramanenagar | General | Dr. M.S Shivaprasad | Bharatiya Janata Party | Malleshwaram | Bangalore North | 7.5 | 8825 | 30397 | 36738 | 4053 | 4919 | 20.90 | 33.30 |
| 36 | Mathikere | General | Muniswamy Gowda | Bharatiya Janata Party | Malleshwaram | Bangalore North | 0.9 | 9592 | 35882 | 37036 | 39869 | 41069 | 3.20 | 11.80 |
| 37 | Yeshwanthpura | General | Munirathna | Indian National Congress | Rajarajeshwarinagar | Bangalore Rural | 0.8 | 10326 | 35972 | 41107 | 44965 | 53039 | 14.30 | 28.60 |
| 38 | H. M. T. | General (Women) | Asha Suresh | Indian National Congress | Rajarajeshwarinagar | Bangalore Rural | 5.2 | 9524 | 29764 | 36879 | 5724 | 7053 | 23.90 | 31.70 |
| 39 | Chokkasandra | Backward Category A | M. Muniswamy | Janata Dal (Secular) | Dasarahalli | Bangalore North | 3.8 | 16537 | 30117 | 59289 | 7926 | 15752 | 96.90 | 106.40 |
| 40 | Dodda Bidarkallu | General (Women) | T.A.Gayithree | Janata Dal (Secular) | Yeshvanthapura | Bangalore North | 12.9 | 19506 | 19349 | 72794 | 1500 | 5649 | 276.20 | 309.60 |
| 41 | Peenya Industrial Area | General | K.L Thimmananjayya | Independent | Dasarahalli | Bangalore North | 5.5 | 15805 | 27467 | 57814 | 4994 | 10423 | 110.50 | 121.20 |
| 42 | Lakshmidevinagar | Backward Category A | Thimmaraju | Bharatiya Janata Party | Rajarajeshwarinagar | Bangalore Rural | 1.5 | 10620 | 25578 | 41352 | 17052 | 27235 | 61.70 | 71.00 |
| 43 | Nandini Layout | Backward Category A | M Nagaraj | Indian National Congress | Mahalakshmi Layout | Bangalore North | 1.4 | 13291 | 34318 | 51200 | 24513 | 36191 | 49.20 | 57.90 |
| 44 | Marappana Palya | General (Women) | Lakshmi | Janata Dal (Secular) | Mahalakshmi Layout | Bangalore North | 2.0 | 10051 | 34002 | 40212 | 17001 | 19785 | 18.30 | 28.50 |
| 45 | Malleshwaram | Backward Category A | N. Jayapala | Indian National Congress | Malleshwaram | Bangalore North | 1.8 | 8503 | 36321 | 34196 | 20178 | 18939 | -5.90 | -0.2 |
| 46 | Jayachamarajendranagar | General | N. Govindraju | Indian National Congress | Hebbal | Bangalore North | 0.9 | 7696 | 30743 | 31449 | 34159 | 35246 | 2.30 | 14.50 |
| 47 | Devarajeevanahalli | Scheduled Caste | Sri.R. Sampath Raj. | Indian National Congress | Pulakeshinagar | Bangalore North | 1.4 | 8941 | 33483 | 42135 | 23916 | 30833 | 25.80 | 35.20 |
| 48 | Muneshwaranagar | Scheduled Caste | S. Kriyaa Shylaja | Janata Dal (Secular) | Pulakeshinagar | Bangalore North | 0.5 | 7419 | 30508 | 35814 | 61016 | 74511 | 17.40 | 26.90 |
| 49 | Lingarajapuram | General (Women) | Lavanya Ganesh Reddy | Indian National Congress | Sarvagnanagar | Bangalore Central | 0.9 | 8850 | 32375 | 37955 | 35972 | 43274 | 17.20 | 29.70 |
| 50 | Benniganahalli | Scheduled Caste | N. Dayanand | Bharatiya Janata Party | C. V. Raman Nagar | Bangalore Central | 4.9 | 12384 | 31985 | 49094 | 6528 | 9980 | 53.50 | 67.40 |
| 51 | Vijinapura | Scheduled Caste | Sugumar (Sugun) | Bharatiya Janata Party | Krishnarajapuram | Bangalore North | 2.1 | 11087 | 35087 | 46159 | 16708 | 22464 | 31.60 | 42.50 |
| 52 | Krishnarajapuram | General | N.Veeranna | Bharatiya Janata Party | Krishnarajapuram | Bangalore North | 4.8 | 8961 | 26485 | 35168 | 5518 | 7308 | 32.80 | 52.80 |
| 53 | Basavanapura | General | K Poornima | Indian National Congress | Krishnarajapuram | Bangalore North | 6.3 | 11936 | 22012 | 48585 | 3494 | 7740 | 12.70 | 134.00 |
| 54 | Hoodi | Backward Category A | B.A. Basavaraju | Indian National Congress | Mahadevapura | Bangalore Central | 15 | 12579 | 20700 | 50191 | 1380 | 3349 | 142.50 | 168.20 |
| 55 | Devasandra | Backward Category B | R. Manjula Devi | Bharatiya Janata Party | Krishnarajapuram | Bangalore North | 3.5 | 8638 | 22057 | 33946 | 6302 | 9754 | 53.90 | 69.70 |
| 56 | A. Narayanapura | Backward Category A | S. S. Prasad | Bharatiya Janata Party | Krishnarajapuram | Bangalore North | 2.1 | 11039 | 29420 | 43443 | 14010 | 20286 | 47.70 | 62.30 |
| 57 | C. V. Raman Nagar | Backward Category A | M Krishnappa | Bharatiya Janata Party | C. V. Raman Nagar | Bangalore Central | 3.6 | 16710 | 29760 | 58815 | 8267 | 16379 | 97.60 | 125.80 |
| 58 | Hosathippasandra | General (Women) | Sumithra | Bharatiya Janata Party | C. V. Raman Nagar | Bangalore Central | 3.4 | 12200 | 34577 | 43983 | 10170 | 13085 | 27.20 | 44.60 |
| 59 | Maruthisevanagar | Scheduled Caste | R. Rajendran | Indian National Congress | Sarvagnanagar | Bangalore Central | 2.4 | 10113 | 35811 | 40362 | 14921 | 16942 | 12.70 | 26.50 |
| 60 | Sagayarapuram | Scheduled Caste | V.Palaniyammal | Indian National Congress | Pulakeshinagar | Bangalore North | 0.8 | 7340 | 34874 | 35334 | 43593 | 45792 | 1.30 | 16.80 |
| 61 | S. K. Garden | Scheduled Caste | Devikarani Sridhar | Indian National Congress | Pulakeshinagar | Bangalore North | 1.3 | 7941 | 33939 | 38050 | 26107 | 29129 | 12.10 | 26.50 |
| 62 | Ramaswamypalya | Scheduled Caste | N. Chandra | Indian National Congress | Shivajinagar | Bangalore Central | 0.8 | 7530 | 32400 | 34394 | 40500 | 41334 | 6.20 | 14.50 |
| 63 | Jayamahal | General | Sri.M.K Gunashekar | Indian National Congress | Shivajinagar | Bangalore Central | 1.4 | 4808 | 24065 | 21728 | 17189 | 14986 | -9.70 | 4.20 |
| 64 | Rajamahal | General (Women) | M. Vijaya Kumari | Bharatiya Janata Party | Malleshwaram | Bangalore North | 0.7 | 7641 | 33964 | 31118 | 48520 | 43530 | -8.40 | -1.00 |
| 65 | Kadumalleshwara | Backward Category A | G.Manjunath Raju | Bharatiya Janata Party | Malleshwaram | Bangalore North | 1.4 | 9823 | 34053 | 35609 | 24324 | 26086 | 4.60 | 15.70 |
| 66 | Subrahmanyanagar | General (Women) | S. Shashikala Kiran | Bharatiya Janata Party | Malleshwaram | Bangalore North | 0.9 | 9383 | 34833 | 35709 | 38703 | 37919 | 2.40 | 10.00 |
| 67 | Nagapura | Backward Category A | S.Harish | Bharatiya Janata Party | Mahalakshmi Layout | Bangalore North | 1.8 | 8667 | 35553 | 34575 | 19752 | 19260 | -2.80 | 6.90 |
| 68 | Mahalakshmipuram | Backward Category B | S. Keshavmurthy | Indian National Congress | Mahalakshmi Layout | Bangalore North | 0.9 | 11563 | 35976 | 44615 | 39973 | 47275 | 24.00 | 33.00 |
| 69 | Laggere | General | Lakshmikanth Reddy | Bharatiya Janata Party | Rajarajeshwarinagar | Bangalore Rural | 1.6 | 15178 | 25370 | 57077 | 15856 | 36245 | 125.00 | 137.40 |
| 70 | Rajagopalanagar | General | H.N. Gangadhara | Bharatiya Janata Party | Dasarahalli | Bangalore North | 2.2 | 17262 | 28604 | 61479 | 13002 | 28249 | 114.90 | 134.50 |
| 71 | Hegganahalli | General | Sri.M.B Govindegowda | Independent | Dasarahalli | Bangalore North | 1.8 | 18438 | 30889 | 66314 | 17161 | 37639 | 114.70 | 133.00 |
| 72 | Herohalli | Backward Category B | A.M. Hanumanthegowda | Janata Dal (Secular) | Yeshvanthapura | Bangalore North | 7.8 | 16215 | 19668 | 62272 | 2522 | 8035 | 216.60 | 240.00 |
| 73 | Kottigepalya | General | S. Venkatesh Babu | Bharatiya Janata Party | Rajarajeshwarinagar | Bangalore Rural | 5.8 | 17739 | 29100 | 68922 | 5017 | 11784 | 136.80 | 148.70 |
| 74 | Shakthiganapathinagar | General (Women) | Padmavathi Srinivas | Janata Dal (Secular) | Mahalakshmi Layout | Bangalore North | 0.7 | 11074 | 34530 | 43844 | 49329 | 62588 | 27.00 | 37.40 |
| 75 | Shankara Matha | General | M. Shivaraju | Indian National Congress | Mahalakshmi Layout | Bangalore North | 1.1 | 12433 | 35679 | 48734 | 32435 | 44963 | 36.60 | 48.60 |
| 76 | Gayathrinagar | General (Women) | Chetan Gowda | Bharatiya Janata Party | Malleshwaram | Bangalore North | 0.6 | 8489 | 35389 | 33236 | 58982 | 51465 | -6.10 | 0.90 |
| 77 | Dattathreya Temple | General | R. S. Sathyanarayana | Indian National Congress | Gandhi Nagar | Bangalore Central | 0.7 | 8325 | 34236 | 33388 | 48909 | 46485 | -2.50 | 4.40 |
| 78 | Pulakeshinagar | General | Abdul Rakeeb Zakir | Indian National Congress | Pulakeshinagar | Bangalore North | 1.7 | 6595 | 28149 | 28835 | 16558 | 16761 | 2.40 | 13.00 |
| 79 | Sarvagnanagar | Scheduled Caste | G. Bhuvaneshwari | Bharatiya Janata Party | C. V. Raman Nagar | Bangalore Central | 3.6 | 9052 | 34943 | 37291 | 9706 | 10218 | 6.70 | 17.10 |
| 80 | Hoysalanagar | Scheduled Caste | Savitha Ramesh | Bharatiya Janata Party | C. V. Raman Nagar | Bangalore Central | 2.1 | 8877 | 35890 | 35228 | 17090 | 17131 | -1.80 | 11.60 |
| 81 | Vignananagar | General (Women) | Geetha Vivekananda | Bharatiya Janata Party | Krishnarajapuram | Bangalore North | 5.7 | 15419 | 24757 | 57062 | 4343 | 9935 | 130.50 | 165.30 |
| 82 | Garudacharpalya | General | N. Pillappa | Indian National Congress | Mahadevapura | Bangalore Central | 6.8 | 13453 | 20920 | 49631 | 3076 | 7316 | 137.20 | 154.90 |
| 83 | Kadugudi | General | K.N Anjaneya Reddy | Indian National Congress | Mahadevapura | Bangalore Central | 11.2 | 11423 | 22205 | 43942 | 1983 | 3934 | 97.90 | 122.80 |
| 84 | Hagadooru | Backward Category B | H.A.Srinivasa | Indian National Congress | Mahadevapura | Bangalore Central | 12.6 | 13419 | 25915 | 50556 | 2057 | 4003 | 95.10 | 124.10 |
| 85 | Doddanekkundi | General | N.R. Sridhar Reddy | Bharatiya Janata Party | Mahadevapura | Bangalore Central | 12.0 | 17755 | 22016 | 63083 | 1835 | 5270 | 186.5 | 235.80 |
| 86 | Marathahalli | Backward Category A (Women) | J. Varalakshmi | Indian National Congress | Mahadevapura | Bangalore Central | 3.1 | 11051 | 22489 | 39768 | 7255 | 12679 | 76.80 | 107.30 |
| 87 | HAL Airport | General | Siddalingaiah (Siddu) | Bharatiya Janata Party | Krishnarajapuram | Bangalore North | 6.8 | 10044 | 33066 | 39926 | 4863 | 5888 | 20.70 | 35.20 |
| 88 | Jeevanabima Nagar | Scheduled Caste | K ChandraShekar | Bharatiya Janata Party | C. V. Raman Nagar | Bangalore Central | 1.9 | 9741 | 36152 | 38251 | 19027 | 20286 | 5.80 | 17.50 |
| 89 | Jogupalya | General | M. Gowtham Kumar | Bharatiya Janata Party | Shanthinagar | Bangalore Central | 0.9 | 8806 | 34611 | 33793 | 38457 | 37452 | -2.40 | 8.40 |
| 90 | Ulsoor | Scheduled Caste | R. Uday Kumar | Indian National Congress | Shivajinagar | Bangalore Central | 1.7 | 7771 | 35891 | 35090 | 21112 | 20803 | -2.20 | 10.10 |
| 91 | Bharathinagar | General | Shakeel Ahmad | Indian National Congress | Shivajinagar | Bangalore Central | 0.8 | 7074 | 32632 | 32689 | 40790 | 41815 | 0.20 | 13.40 |
| 92 | Shivajinagar | General (Women) | Fareeda | Independent | Shivajinagar | Bangalore Central | 0.4 | 7276 | 35740 | 37506 | 89350 | 87856 | 4.90 | 22.00 |
| 93 | Vasanthnagar | General | Katta Jagadish | Bharatiya Janata Party | Shivajinagar | Bangalore Central | 3.1 | 5304 | 25632 | 22815 | 8268 | 7286 | -11.00 | -3.40 |
| 94 | Gandhinagar | General | S Nataraj | Indian National Congress | Gandhi Nagar | Bangalore Central | 1.9 | 6599 | 35310 | 31208 | 18584 | 16334 | -11.60 | -3.90 |
| 95 | Subhashnagar | Scheduled Caste | T. Mallesh | Indian National Congress | Gandhi Nagar | Bangalore Central | 1.3 | 8711 | 35427 | 37693 | 27252 | 28599 | 6.40 | 21.50 |
| 96 | Okalipuram | Scheduled Caste | Queen Elizebeth | Indian National Congress | Gandhi Nagar | Bangalore Central | 0.8 | 8693 | 35875 | 38110 | 44844 | 46279 | 6.20 | 16.70 |
| 97 | Dayanandanagar | Scheduled Caste | Smt.M Shakeela | Indian National Congress | Rajaji Nagar | Bangalore Central | 0.4 | 8253 | 34595 | 35721 | 86488 | 80035 | 3.30 | 14.50 |
| 98 | Prakashnagar | General | K Raveendran | Bharatiya Janata Party | Rajaji Nagar | Bangalore Central | 0.6 | 8276 | 35465 | 32913 | 59108 | 57730 | -7.20 | 1.20 |
| 99 | Rajajinagar | Backward Category A | H.R Krishnappa | Bharatiya Janata Party | Rajaji Nagar | Bangalore Central | 0.9 | 8398 | 33231 | 33084 | 36923 | 38388 | -0.40 | 11.10 |
| 100 | Basaveshwaranagar | Backward Category A | S.H. Padmaraj | Bharatiya Janata Party | Rajaji Nagar | Bangalore Central | 0.8 | 7495 | 27002 | 30333 | 33753 | 36191 | 12.30 | 21.90 |
| 101 | Kamakshipalya | General | K. Ranganna | Bharatiya Janata Party | Rajaji Nagar | Bangalore Central | 0.9 | 7482 | 25742 | 30051 | 28602 | 33135 | 16.70 | 27.90 |
| 102 | Vrishabhavathi | Backward Category A (Women) | L Nagarathna | Janata Dal (Secular) | Mahalakshmi Layout | Bangalore North | 1.0 | 13443 | 34339 | 50893 | 34339 | 51187 | 48.20 | 63.70 |
| 103 | Kaveripura | General | R. Prakash | Janata Dal (Secular) | Govindraj Nagar | Bangalore South | 1.7 | 14168 | 35256 | 53532 | 20739 | 32357 | 51.80 | 62.90 |
| 104 | Govindarajanagar | Backward Category A | Mohan Kumar | Bharatiya Janata Party | Govindraj Nagar | Bangalore South | 0.8 | 6678 | 25773 | 26873 | 32216 | 34956 | 4.30 | 13.80 |
| 105 | Agrahara Dasarahalli | Backward Category A (Women) | Roopadevi | Bharatiya Janata Party | Govindraj Nagar | Bangalore South | 0.8 | 7192 | 26587 | 28355 | 33234 | 35597 | 5.60 | 15.30 |
| 106 | Dr. Rajkumar | General | Gangabyrayya | Bharatiya Janata Party | Govindraj Nagar | Bangalore South | 1.0 | 6077 | 24752 | 24181 | 24752 | 24492 | -2.30 | 6.50 |
| 107 | Shivanagar | General | Manjunath | Bharatiya Janata Party | Rajaji Nagar | Bangalore Central | 0.8 | 9260 | 35797 | 36461 | 44746 | 46943 | 1.30 | 8.60 |
| 108 | Srirama Mandir | Backward Category A (Women) | M.G. Jayarathna | Bharatiya Janata Party | Rajaji Nagar | Bangalore Central | 1.1 | 8156 | 33613 | 33866 | 30557 | 31973 | 0.80 | 9.70 |
| 109 | Chickpete | General | A.L Shivakumar | Bharatiya Janata Party | Gandhi Nagar | Bangalore Central | 0.7 | 6842 | 33698 | 33292 | 48140 | 46929 | -1.20 | 10.60 |
| 110 | Sampangiramanagar | Backward Category A | M. Gopi | Bharatiya Janata Party | Shivajinagar | Bangalore Central | 4.4 | 6423 | 33120 | 27504 | 7527 | 6185 | -17.00 | -7.40 |
| 111 | Shanthalanagar | Backward Category A | K. Shivakumar | Independent | Shanthinagar | Bangalore Central | 4.0 | 5493 | 30225 | 22995 | 7556 | 5745 | -23.90 | -13.90 |
| 112 | Domlur | General (Women) | Geetha Srinivasareddy | Bharatiya Janata Party | Shanthinagar | Bangalore Central | 1.7 | 7844 | 34703 | 30638 | 20414 | 17557 | -11.70 | -4.30 |
| 113 | Konena Agrahara | General | M. Chandrappa Reddy | Bharatiya Janata Party | C. V. Raman Nagar | Bangalore Central | 2.1 | 10725 | 29344 | 38108 | 13973 | 17919 | 29.90 | 48.00 |
| 114 | Agaram | Scheduled Caste | Sarala | Indian National Congress | Shanthinagar | Bangalore Central | 11.0 | 7734 | 35632 | 36916 | 3239 | 3345 | 3.60 | 12.10 |
| 115 | Vannarpet | Scheduled Caste | S. Vijayan | Indian National Congress | Shanthinagar | Bangalore Central | 0.8 | 8466 | 35532 | 37060 | 44415 | 48898 | 4.30 | 12.50 |
| 116 | Neelasandra | Scheduled Tribe | Lokesh | Indian National Congress | Shanthinagar | Bangalore Central | 0.5 | 10743 | 36279 | 48534 | 72558 | 94287 | 33.80 | 46.00 |
| 117 | Shanthinagar | General (Women) | P Sowmya | Indian National Congress | Shanthinagar | Bangalore Central | 2.7 | 9465 | 36426 | 42095 | 13491 | 15494 | 15.60 | 24.30 |
| 118 | Sudhamanagar | Scheduled Caste | Kumari Avvayi | Indian National Congress | Chickpet | Bangalore South | 1.0 | 5953 | 32202 | 28784 | 32202 | 28586 | -10.60 | 0.30 |
| 119 | Dharmarayaswamy Temple | Backward Category A | P. Dhanaraj | Bharatiya Janata Party | Chickpet | Bangalore South | 1.1 | 5485 | 33199 | 27076 | 30181 | 24561 | -18.40 | -11.10 |
| 120 | Cottonpet | Backward Category A (Women) | Vasanth Kumari | Bharatiya Janata Party | Gandhi Nagar | Bangalore Central | 0.8 | 8652 | 36582 | 37344 | 45728 | 49463 | 2.10 | 14.00 |
| 121 | Binnipete | Backward Category A (Women) | N. SriVidya | Indian National Congress | Gandhi Nagar | Bangalore Central | 0.8 | 9061 | 33946 | 37354 | 42433 | 48081 | 10.00 | 24.20 |
| 122 | Kempapura Agrahara | Backward Category A (Women) | Nirmala | Indian National Congress | Vijay Nagar | Bangalore South | 0.4 | 10051 | 33736 | 40032 | 84340 | 113291 | 18.70 | 32.30 |
| 123 | Vijaynagar | General | Sri.H. Raveendra | Bharatiya Janata Party | Vijay Nagar | Bangalore South | 0.7 | 9943 | 36077 | 40331 | 51539 | 55298 | 11.80 | 22.70 |
| 124 | Hosahalli | Backward Category A | Dr. S. Raju | Bharatiya Janata Party | Vijay Nagar | Bangalore South | 0.9 | 9068 | 32103 | 37347 | 35670 | 55298 | 11.80 | 22.70 |
| 125 | Marenahalli | Backward Category A (Women) | N. Shakuntala | Bharatiya Janata Party | Govindraj Nagar | Bangalore South | 0.7 | 5423 | 20068 | 21171 | 28669 | 30709 | 5.50 | 15.50 |
| 126 | Maruthi Mandira | General | V. Vagish | Bharatiya Janata Party | Govindraj Nagar | Bangalore South | 0.8 | 7716 | 21784 | 29319 | 27230 | 37155 | 34.60 | 46.70 |
| 127 | Moodalapalya | Backward Category A (Women) | N. Shanthakumari | Bharatiya Janata Party | Govindraj Nagar | Bangalore South | 1.0 | 11125 | 24487 | 43729 | 24487 | 45077 | 78.60 | 64.60 |
| 128 | Nagarabhavi | General | K. Umesh Shetti | Bharatiya Janata Party | Govindraj Nagar | Bangalore South | 1.6 | 8255 | 20269 | 35780 | 12668 | 22406 | 76.50 | 84.80 |
| 129 | Jnanabharathi | Backward Category B | Govindaraju | Indian National Congress | Rajarajeshwarinagar | Bangalore Rural | 11.9 | 17410 | 25889 | 68132 | 2176 | 5743 | 163.20 | 187.90 |
| 130 | Ullalu | Backward Category A | Rajanna | Indian National Congress | Yeshvanthapura | Bangalore North | 8.7 | 14511 | 20332 | 58199 | 2337 | 6688 | 186.20 | 208.70 |
| 131 | Nayandahalli | General (Women) | H.S. Rajajeshwari | Bharatiya Janata Party | Govindraj Nagar | Bangalore South | 2.1 | 10285 | 22878 | 42785 | 10894 | 20860 | 87.00 | 98.10 |
| 132 | Attiguppe | General | K. Doddanna | Indian National Congress | Vijay Nagar | Bangalore South | 1.4 | 10576 | 26806 | 41487 | 19147 | 29971 | 54.80 | 72.00 |
| 133 | Hampinagar | General | R. ChandraShekarayya | Bharatiya Janata Party | Vijay Nagar | Bangalore South | 1.1 | 8456 | 30355 | 35113 | 27595 | 31659 | 15.70 | 25.50 |
| 134 | Bapujinagar | Backward Category A | V. Krishna | Bharatiya Janata Party | Vijay Nagar | Bangalore South | 0.7 | 10647 | 36234 | 49484 | 51763 | 72549 | 36.60 | 45.40 |
| 135 | Padarayanapura | General (Women) | Najini Begum | Independent | Chamrajpet | Bangalore Central | 0.3 | 7273 | 35213 | 37599 | 117377 | 118059 | 6.80 | 17.00 |
| 136 | Jagjivanram Nagar | General (Women) | Seema Kanum | Indian National Congress | Chamrajpet | Bangalore Central | 0.6 | 7751 | 33758 | 38639 | 56263 | 60762 | 14.50 | 22.20 |
| 137 | Rayapuram | Scheduled Caste | C.S. Radhakrishna | Janata Dal (Secular) | Chamrajpet | Bangalore Central | 0.4 | 7549 | 32949 | 36039 | 82373 | 81770 | 9.40 | 26.90 |
| 138 | Chalavadipalya | Scheduled Caste | Rekha Kadiresh | Bharatiya Janata Party | Chamrajpet | Bangalore Central | 0.4 | 4896 | 25319 | 24801 | 63298 | 62762 | -2.00 | 5.10 |
| 139 | Krishnarajendra Market | Scheduled Caste | G. A. Ashwath Narayana | Janata Dal (Secular) | Chamrajpet | Bangalore Central | 0.8 | 5903 | 28514 | 29344 | 35643 | 36068 | 2.90 | 7.60 |
| 140 | Chamarajapet | Backward Category A | B.V Ganesh | Bharatiya Janata Party | Chamrajpet | Bangalore Central | 1.0 | 7500 | 33398 | 32213 | 33398 | 30976 | -3.50 | 5.30 |
| 141 | Azadnagar | General (Women) | Gowramma | Indian National Congress | Chamrajpet | Bangalore Central | 0.7 | 9246 | 35741 | 38825 | 51059 | 57539 | 8.60 | 20.30 |
| 142 | Sunkenahalli | General | P. N. Sadashiva | Bharatiya Janata Party | Chickpet | Bangalore South | 1.5 | 8643 | 36158 | 34666 | 24105 | 23137 | 4.10 | 3.40 |
| 143 | Visvesvarapuram | General | S. Anil Kumar | Bharatiya Janata Party | Chickpet | Bangalore South | 2.5 | 7361 | 36093 | 32462 | 14437 | 13186 | -10.10 | -2.50 |
| 144 | Siddapura | General | M. Udayshankar | Indian National Congress | Chickpet | Bangalore South | 0.7 | 7396 | 32194 | 34879 | 45991 | 52299 | 8.30 | 14.60 |
| 145 | Hombegowdanagar | General | D. Chandrappa | Independent | Chickpet | Bangalore South | 1.4 | 8948 | 36455 | 38309 | 26039 | 27202 | 5.10 | 16.40 |
| 146 | Lakkasandra | General | K. Mahesh Babu | Bharatiya Janata Party | B.T.M Layout | Bangalore South | 1.3 | 7229 | 28303 | 30667 | 21772 | 23689 | 8.40 | 21.80 |
| 147 | Adugodi | General | S.N. Murugesh Modaliyaar | Indian National Congress | B.T.M Layout | Bangalore South | 1.6 | 8236 | 29945 | 34299 | 18716 | 21559 | 14.50 | 26.00 |
| 148 | Ejipura | General (Women) | P.M Saroja | Indian National Congress | B.T.M Layout | Bangalore South | 1.9 | 12575 | 29105 | 47004 | 15318 | 25093 | 61.50 | 84.00 |
| 149 | Varthur | General | S. UdayKumar | Indian National Congress | Mahadevapura | Bangalore Central | 28.3 | 14256 | 25067 | 54625 | 886 | 1929 | 117.90 | 160.20 |
| 150 | Bellandur | Backward Category B | B.P. Babu Reddy | Indian National Congress | Mahadevapura | Bangalore Central | 26.4 | 22368 | 20526 | 80180 | 778 | 3041 | 290.60 | 374.50 |
| 151 | Koramangala | Backward Category A (Women) | B.N. Kokila | Indian National Congress | B.T.M Layout | Bangalore South | 3.7 | 9719 | 35359 | 38316 | 9556 | 10323 | 8.40 | 17.10 |
| 152 | Suddaguntepalya | General | G. Manjunath | Bharatiya Janata Party | B.T.M Layout | Bangalore South | 1.7 | 10933 | 35910 | 39997 | 21124 | 23063 | 11.40 | 31.00 |
| 153 | Jayanagar | General (Women) | Gangambika | Indian National Congress | Chickpet | Bangalore South | 2.5 | 8427 | 35963 | 38151 | 14385 | 15288 | 6.10 | 17.80 |
| 154 | Basavanagudi | General | B.S. Sathyanarayana | Bharatiya Janata Party | Basavanagudi | Bangalore South | 1.2 | 8624 | 36015 | 32640 | 30013 | 28071 | -9.40 | -2.70 |
| 155 | Hanumanthanagar | General | K. Chandrashekar | Indian National Congress | Basavanagudi | Bangalore South | 1.0 | 9483 | 35065 | 36982 | 35065 | 37440 | 5.50 | 13.10 |
| 156 | Srinagar | General | T. Thimmegowda | Janata Dal (Secular) | Basavanagudi | Bangalore South | 0.8 | 10574 | 36045 | 41379 | 45056 | 51685 | 14.80 | 22.70 |
| 157 | Gali Anjaneya Temple | General | B.S. Anand | Bharatiya Janata Party | Vijay Nagar | Bangalore South | 1.1 | 8668 | 27264 | 34653 | 24785 | 30439 | 27.10 | 36.70 |
| 158 | Deepanjalinagar | Backward Category A (Women) | Malathi | Bharatiya Janata Party | Vijay Nagar | Bangalore South | 2.1 | 11676 | 30924 | 45928 | 14726 | 21980 | 48.50 | 59.50 |
| 159 | Kengeri | General | R. Anjanappa | Bharatiya Janata Party | Yeshvanthapura | Bangalore North | 5.1 | 10168 | 24870 | 40771 | 4876 | 7980 | 63.90 | 74.40 |
| 160 | Rajarajeshwarinagar | General | G.H.Ramachandra | Bharatiya Janata Party | Rajarajeshwarinagar | Bangalore Rural | 11.1 | 14408 | 23282 | 56897 | 2097 | 5112 | 144.40 | 160.90 |
| 161 | Hosakerehalli | General | H. Narayana | Bharatiya Janata Party | Padmanabhanagar | Bangalore South | 1.3 | 12122 | 21185 | 46805 | 16296 | 34776 | 120.90 | 137.60 |
| 162 | Girinagar | General (Women) | H.S. Lalitha (deceased) | Bharatiya Janata Party | Basavanagudi | Bangalore South | 1.8 | 11180 | 34912 | 43195 | 19396 | 24537 | 23.70 | 33.40 |
| 163 | Kathriguppe | Backward Category A | D. Venkatesha Murthy | Bharatiya Janata Party | Basavanagudi | Bangalore South | 1.1 | 11997 | 35736 | 45572 | 32487 | 41071 | 27.50 | 35.50 |
| 164 | Vidyapeetha | Backward Category A | M. Venkatesh | Bharatiya Janata Party | Basavanagudi | Bangalore South | 1.2 | 11425 | 34535 | 43483 | 28779 | 35279 | 25.90 | 39.20 |
| 165 | Ganesh Mandira | Backward Category A | L. Govindraj | Indian National Congress | Padmanabhanagar | Bangalore South | 1.6 | 6472 | 23101 | 25998 | 14438 | 15979 | 12.50 | 21.00 |
| 166 | Karisandra | General (Women) | Jyothisri Hari Reddy | Indian National Congress | Padmanabhanagar | Bangalore South | 1.1 | 6492 | 30206 | 27040 | 27460 | 24444 | -10.50 | 3.30 |
| 167 | Yediyur | Backward Category A | N. R. Ramesh | Bharatiya Janata Party | Padmanabhanagar | Bangalore South | 1.2 | 8455 | 34591 | 32756 | 28826 | 26683 | -5.30 | 3.70 |
| 168 | Pattabhiramnagar | General | C. K. Ramamurthy | Bharatiya Janata Party | Jayanagar | Bangalore South | 1.7 | 7163 | 30989 | 28353 | 18229 | 16438 | -8.50 | 1.60 |
| 169 | Byrasandra | Backward Category A | N. Nagaraju | Bharatiya Janata Party | Jayanagar | Bangalore South | 0.9 | 7423 | 30638 | 32066 | 34042 | 36971 | 4.70 | 15.10 |
| 170 | Jayanagar East | Backward Category A | Muni Sanjeevayya | Indian National Congress | Jayanagar | Bangalore South | 1.0 | 7961 | 30846 | 33927 | 30846 | 32869 | 10.00 | 22.50 |
| 171 | Gurappanapalya | General | Mohammad Rizwan Navab | Indian National Congress | Jayanagar | Bangalore South | 0.7 | 11517 | 35828 | 42624 | 51183 | 72068 | 36.70 | 53.90 |
| 172 | Madiwala | General | B.N. Manjunath Reddy | Indian National Congress | B.T.M Layout | Bangalore South | 1.2 | 11517 | 35155 | 42694 | 29296 | 36612 | 21.20 | 41.30 |
| 173 | Jakkasandra | General (Women) | Saraswathamma | Bharatiya Janata Party | B.T.M Layout | Bangalore South | 1.5 | 9040 | 24088 | 33521 | 16059 | 22020 | 39.20 | 59.70 |
| 174 | HSR Layout | General (Women) | Smt.K. Latha | Bharatiya Janata Party | Bommanahalli | Bangalore South | 7.1 | 16847 | 24749 | 63033 | 3486 | 8879 | 154.70 | 182.90 |
| 175 | Bommanahalli | General | B.S. Manjunath Reddy | Bharatiya Janata Party | Bommanahalli | Bangalore South | 1.8 | 11368 | 24307 | 43585 | 13504 | 23819 | 79.30 | 92.80 |
| 176 | BTM Layout | General | G.N.R. Babu | Indian National Congress | B.T.M Layout | Bangalore South | 2.1 | 14540 | 34436 | 52250 | 16398 | 24688 | 51.70 | 77.10 |
| 177 | J. P. Nagar | Backward Category A | N. Chandrashekar Raju | Bharatiya Janata Party | Jayanagar | Bangalore South | 1.8 | 7566 | 28508 | 28846 | 15838 | 15915 | 1.20 | 14.00 |
| 178 | Sarakki | General | S.K. Nataraj | Bharatiya Janata Party | Jayanagar | Bangalore South | 1.3 | 7985 | 26707 | 31034 | 20544 | 23305 | 16.20 | 28.30 |
| 179 | Shakambarinagar | Backward Category A | B. Somashekar | Bharatiya Janata Party | Jayanagar | Bangalore South | 1.9 | 6537 | 23239 | 25871 | 12231 | 13946 | 11.30 | 19.80 |
| 180 | Banashankari Temple | General | Deewan Ali | Janata Dal (Secular) | Padmanabhanagar | Bangalore South | 0.7 | 9461 | 34022 | 42171 | 48603 | 61696 | 24.00 | 32.10 |
| 181 | Kumaraswamy Layout | Backward Category A | H. Suresh | Bharatiya Janata Party | Padmanabhanagar | Bangalore South | 1.8 | 11881 | 35384 | 47182 | 19658 | 25514 | 33.30 | 44.00 |
| 182 | Padmanabhanagar | General | L. Srinivas | Bharatiya Janata Party | Padmanabhanagar | Bangalore South | 1.7 | 10771 | 25454 | 41037 | 14973 | 24311 | 61.20 | 75.60 |
| 183 | Chikkalasandra | General | B. S. Venkataswamy Naidu | Bharatiya Janata Party | Padmanabhanagar | Bangalore South | 1.1 | 11403 | 24677 | 43364 | 22434 | 39948 | 75.70 | 87.80 |
| 184 | Uttarahalli | Backward Category A | K.Ramesh Raju | Bharatiya Janata Party | Bangalore South | Bangalore Rural | 9.9 | 14675 | 21845 | 57209 | 2207 | 5759 | 161.90 | 176.30 |
| 185 | Yelachenahalli | Backward Category A | O. Manjunath | Indian National Congress | Bangalore South | Bangalore Rural | 1.6 | 11338 | 28000 | 46943 | 17500 | 29234 | 67.70 | 85.70 |
| 186 | Jaraganahalli | General (Women) | Suguna Balakrishna | Bharatiya Janata Party | Bommanahalli | Bangalore South | 1.3 | 9818 | 23299 | 38294 | 17922 | 29756 | 64.40 | 77.20 |
| 187 | Puttenahalli | Backward Category A | L. Ramesh | Bharatiya Janata Party | Bommanahalli | Bangalore South | 2.9 | 13230 | 20544 | 49207 | 7084 | 17137 | 139.50 | 171.90 |
| 188 | Bilekahalli | General (Women) | M. Roopa Ramesh | Bharatiya Janata Party | Bommanahalli | Bangalore South | 4.3 | 13186 | 22510 | 49884 | 5235 | 11721 | 121.60 | 143.90 |
| 189 | Hongasandra | Backward Category B | Sukanda | Bharatiya Janata Party | Bommanahalli | Bangalore South | 2.1 | 18192 | 23058 | 68554 | 10980 | 32066 | 197.30 | 219.60 |
| 190 | Mangammanapalya | Backward Category A (Women) | Syed Haseena Taj | Bharatiya Janata Party | Bommanahalli | Bangalore South | 3.5 | 16903 | 27391 | 65890 | 7826 | 18956 | 140.60 | 162.10 |
| 191 | Singasandra | General (Women) | Kavitha Baburaj | Indian National Congress | Bangalore South | Bangalore Rural | 9.7 | 18214 | 21410 | 71004 | 2207 | 7283 | 231.60 | 241.50 |
| 192 | Begur | Backward Category B | M Srinivas | Janata Dal (Secular) | Bangalore South | Bangalore Rural | 19.0 | 21322 | 19287 | 80037 | 1015 | 4216 | 315.00 | 389.30 |
| 193 | Arakere | General | A.N. Purushotham | Bharatiya Janata Party | Bommanahalli | Bangalore South | 6.6 | 15272 | 25003 | 58355 | 3788 | 8810 | 133.40 | 157.10 |
| 194 | Gottigere | Backward Category B | S.K. Pushpa | Indian National Congress | Bangalore South | Bangalore Rural | 7.4 | 13457 | 21526 | 51911 | 2909 | 7049 | 141.20 | 165.20 |
| 195 | Konanakunte | General (Women) | S. Shashirekha Jayaram | Bharatiya Janata Party | Bangalore South | Bangalore Rural | 3.4 | 14984 | 20181 | 57335 | 5936 | 16761 | 184.10 | 212.90 |
| 196 | Anjanapura | General | S. Gangadhar | Indian National Congress | Bangalore South | Bangalore Rural | 11.4 | 11049 | 21080 | 45608 | 1849 | 3997 | 116.40 | 135.10 |
| 197 | Vasanthapura | General (Women) | A. Vijaya | Bharatiya Janata Party | Bangalore South | Bangalore Rural | 5.7 | 16079 | 24522 | 62057 | 4302 | 10852 | 153.10 | 167.70 |
| 198 | Hemmigepura | Backward Category A (Women) | Veena Nagaraju | Bharatiya Janata Party | Yeshvanthapura | Bangalore North | 30.5 | 12687 | 24311 | 50440 | 797 | 1652 | 107.50 | 138.80 |

=== Results summary ===
| Parties and coalitions | Popular vote | | | Seats | |
| Parties and coalitions | Votes | % | ±pp | Won | +/− |
|---|---|---|---|---|---|
| Bharatiya Janata Party (BJP)) | | | | 111 | ▲96 |
| Indian National Congress (INC) | | | | 66 | ▲9 |
| Janata Dal (Secular) (JDS) | | | | 15 | ▲2 |
| Independents (IND) | | | | 6 | ▼3 |
| Janata Dal (United) | | | | 0 | ▼6 |
| Other parties and candidates | | | | 0 | |
| Total | | 100.00 | | 198 | ±0 |
| Valid votes | 30,72,799 | 100 | | | |
| Invalid votes | 0 | 0 | | | |
| Votes cast / turnout | 30,72,799 | 44.04 | | | |
| Abstentions | 39,04,209 | 55.96 | | | |
| Registered voters | 69,77,008 | | | | |

== By-elections ==
| Date of election | Result announcement date | Ward No. | Ward Name | Previous Winner | Party | By-election Winner | Party | Votes Polled | By-election Runner | Party | Votes Polled | Margin | Reason for vacancy | Area (km^{2}) | Population | | Popn density | |
| Date of election | Result announcement date | Ward No. | Ward Name | Previous Winner | Party | By-election Winner | Party | Votes Polled | By-election Runner | Party | Votes Polled | Margin | Reason for vacancy | Area (km^{2}) | 2001 | 2011 | 2001 | 2011 |
|---|---|---|---|---|---|---|---|---|---|---|---|---|---|---|---|---|---|---|
| 2013 | 10 April 2013 | 56 | A. Narayanapura | S. S. Prasad | Bharatiya Janata Party | Vijaya Prasad | Bharatiya Janata Party | 7074 | CK Gopal | Indian National Congress | 6654 | 420 | Election considered invalid (Winner produced invalid certificates) | 2.1 | 29420 | 43443 | 14010 | 20286 |

== See also ==
- Elections in Karnataka
- Bangalore Mahanagara Palike
- List of wards in Bangalore
- List of wards in Bangalore (1995-2006)
- List of wards in Bangalore (2010-2020)
