= Puttenahalli Lake (JP Nagar) =

Lake in India

Puttenahalli Lake, JP Nagar
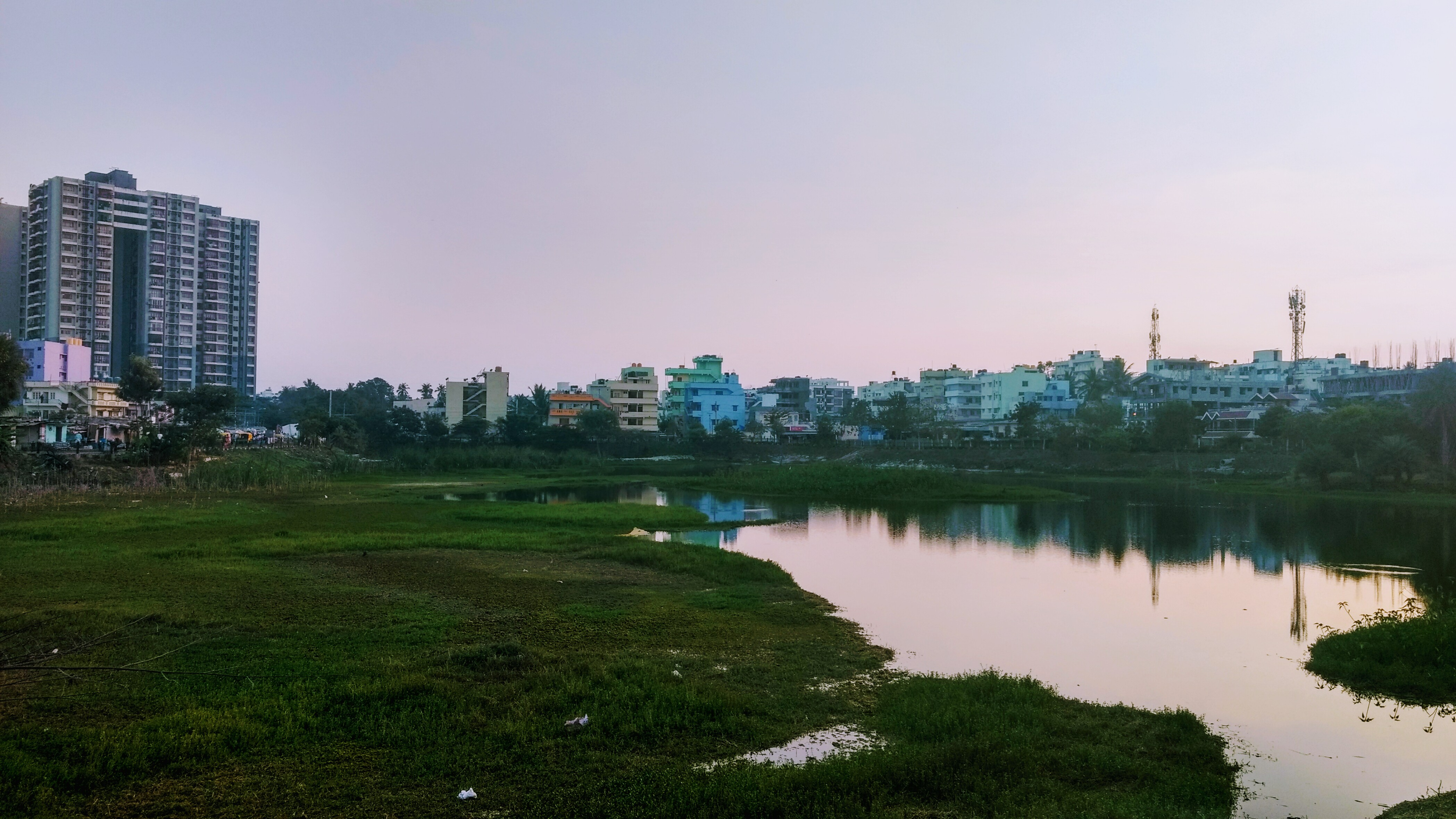
- Puttenahalli Lake of JP Nagar, Bangalore
- Interactive map of Puttenahalli Lake, JP Nagar
- Location: JP Nagar, India
- Nearest city: Bangalore
- Coordinates: 12°53′26.37″N 77°35′12.02″E
- Area: 13 acres (5.3 ha)
- Governing body: Puttenahalli Neighbourhood Lake Improvement Trust

Puttenahalli lake is a small, restored freshwater lake located in JP Nagar 7th Phase, South Bangalore. The area of the lake is about 13 acres. The primary water sources are rain and surface water diverted to the lake through channels. The lake is currently maintained by Puttenahalli Neighbourhood Lake Improvement Trust (PNLIT) . The lake was on the brink of extinction, but due to the efforts of PNLIT, is now a haven for bird-watchers and on its way to being completely restored.

== History and overview ==
For centuries, Puttenahalli lake was one of Bengaluru's pristine lakes. However, pollution and neglect turned it into a cesspool of garbage and sewage. PNLIT, a citizen's group then took the responsibility of conserving and revitalizing the lake. The primary mode of funding for the lake is through donations from local residents. Since then, PNLIT has organized many social events in conjunction with other similar bodies to promote the welfare of the lake and its flora and fauna.

== Flora ==
The following are some trees and plants that grow around the Puttenahalli Lake

- Mahogany
- Cadamba
- Portia tree
- Singapore cherry
- Paradise tree
- Gmelina arborea
- Badminton-ball tree
- Pterygota alata (Buddha coconut)

A full list can be found at the PNLIT Page

== Fauna ==
More than 80 species of birds, both non migratory and migratory, have been spotted at the lake, making it a bird-watcher's paradise. The birds spotted at the Puttenehalli Lake include :

- Indian spot-billed duck
- Purple heron
- Eurasian (common) coot
- Indian pond heron
- Garganey
- Common kingfisher

A full list can be found at the PNLIT Page The Puttakere hotspot on eBird is being used to track the bird sightings at the lake.

== Future plans ==
PNLIT is regularly working with the BBMP for future improvements to the lake and lake area. Karnataka Pollution Control Board (KSPCB) approved a proposal to get excess treated water from a nearby sewage treatment plant to fill the lake with clean water again. Some part of the lake area is encroached by hutments and the Upa Lokayukta is working towards their rehabilitation. BBMP is cleaning and developing lake surrounded by park along with jogging track.
