= Guntakal–Bangalore section =

Bangalore-Guntakal line
- Prasanti Express is one of the daily trains in this section.

Overview
- Status: Operational
- Owner: Indian Railways
- Locale: Andhra Pradesh, Karnataka
- Termini: Guntakal Junction; Bangalore City railway station

Service
- Operator(s): South Western Railway zone South Coast Railway zone

History
- Opened: 1892–93

Technical
- Line length: 293 km (182 mi)
- Num of tracks: 1
- Track gauge: 1,676 mm (5 ft 6 in)
- Old gauge: 1,000 mm (3 ft 3 3/8 in)
- Electrification: Yes
- Operating speed: 110 kilometres per hour (68 mph)

The Guntakal–Bangalore section railway line connects the town of Guntakal in Andhra Pradesh with Bangalore of Karnataka state capital. Further, this section connects Bangalore with several north Indian towns and cities.

== Major stations ==
This section serves the towns of Gooty, Anantapur, Dharmavaram, Puttaparthi and Hindupur in Andhra Pradesh State and this line enters into Karnataka state at Vidurashwatha. The double line between Guntakal and Kalluru passing through Anantapur is a parallel line. It connects Guntakal, Dharmavaram and Bangalore without touching Gooty.

In April 2022, the 511 km of electrification of lines was completed.
