= Greater Bengaluru Authority =

Administrative body for Greater Bengaluru

Greater Bengaluru Authority Br̥hat Beṅgaḷūru Prādhikāra

Type
- Type: An apex body for coordinating and supervising the activities of the City corporations of Bengaluru

History
- Founded: 15 May 2025 (16 months ago) (Establishment and beginning of power transfer from BBMP); 2 September 2025 (12 months ago) (Starts functioning with full capacity)
- Preceded by: Bruhat Bengaluru Mahanagara Palike (2007-2025)

Leadership
- Chairperson (Chief Minister of Karnataka): D. K. Shivakumar, Indian National Congress since 2 September 2025 (12 months ago)
- Vice-Chairperson (Minister of Bengaluru Development and Town Planning, Government of Karnataka): Krishna Byre Gowda, Indian National Congress since 3 June 2026 (3 months ago)
- Chief Commissioner (Member Secretary): M. Maheshwara Rao, Indian Administrative Service since 3 June 2026 (3 months ago)
- Seats: 75 Ex-officio members

Meeting place
- Kempegowda Civic Hall, Hudson Circle (Corporation Circle), Bengaluru, Karnataka, 560002

Website
- gba.karnataka.gov.in

Footnotes
- Governed by: Greater Bengaluru Governance Act, 2024

Greater Bengaluru Authority (GBA) is the apex body responsible for coordinating and supervising the activities of the city corporations and overall development across 712 km^{2} of Greater Bengaluru (Bengaluru City). It was established on 15 May 2025, replacing the Bruhat Bengaluru Mahanagara Palike (BBMP).

The GBA oversees the entire Greater Bengaluru Urban Agglomeration, aiming to coordinate planning, transportation, and environmental management at the metropolitan scale. The GBA has the provision to establish up to seven municipal corporations within the Greater Bengaluru area.

Although the GBA has been officially established, the BBMP continued to function during the transition phase until the new Authority became fully operational on 2 September 2025.

== History ==
The idea for the Greater Bengaluru Authority was first proposed by the BBMP Restructuring Committee in 2015, which recommended a three-tier governance model for Bengaluru consisting of multiple municipal corporations, ward committees, and a metropolitan-level planning authority. The proposal aimed to address administrative inefficiencies and improve urban service delivery in response to the city's rapid population growth and infrastructural strain.

The Government of Karnataka revisited the proposal in 2023 under the "Brand Bengaluru" initiative, seeking public input and expert consultation to restructure the city's governance. Following this, the Greater Bengaluru Governance Bill, 2024 was introduced in the Karnataka Legislative Assembly to provide a legal framework for the restructuring.

The bill was passed in both houses of the Karnataka legislature in March 2025, despite opposition from the Bharatiya Janata Party, Janata Dal (Secular), and civil society groups who raised concerns over the lack of elected representation and potential conflicts with the 74th Constitutional Amendment.

The Greater Bengaluru Authority officially came into existence on 15 May 2025, replacing the Bruhat Bengaluru Mahanagara Palike as the apex urban governance body for Greater Bengaluru.

== Structure ==
The Greater Bengaluru Authority follows a three-tier governance structure, comprising the Authority at the apex, multiple City Corporations, and Ward Committees. The Authority is chaired by the Chief Minister of Karnataka, with the Minister for Bengaluru Development as Vice-Chairperson, while a Chief Commissioner appointed by the state government serves as the Member Secretary.

Ex-officio members with voting rights include ministers holding portfolios related to urban development, mayors of the city corporations, and heads of key civic agencies. All elected representatives of the Lok Sabha, Rajya Sabha, State Legislative Assembly, and State Legislative Council whose constituencies fall wholly or substantially within the Greater Bengaluru Area and who reside within its jurisdiction shall also be members of the Greater Bengaluru Authority.

In addition, the executive heads of the Bengaluru Metropolitan Land Transport Authority, Bengaluru Traffic Police, Karnataka Rail Infrastructure Development Enterprises Limited, Karnataka Tank Conservation and Development Authority, Karnataka State Disaster Management Authority, Karnataka Slum Development Board, and any other officer of a government agency or department entrusted with municipal functions in the Greater Bengaluru Area, as designated by the government, serve as special invitees. These invitees may participate in the meetings of the Greater Bengaluru Authority but do not hold voting rights.

List of 75 Ex-officio members of Greater Bengaluru Authority with Voting Rights
#	Name	Membership due to	Other Roles outside of GBA
Chairperson, Vice-Chairperson and the Managing Director
1	Siddaramaiah	Chief Minister of Karnataka as the Chairperson	Minister of Finance, Government of Karnataka; Minister of Cabinet Affairs, Government of Karnataka; Minister of Personnel and Administrative Reforms, Government of Karnataka; Minister of Intelligence, Government of Karnataka; Minister of Information and Public Relation, Government of Karnataka; Minister of Youth Services, Government of Karnataka; Minister of Sports, Government of Karnataka; Minister of S.T. Welfare, Government of Karnataka; Minister of All Other Departments not held by other ministers, Government of Karnataka; Member of Karnataka Legislative Assembly for Varuna Constituency (219)
2	D. K. Shivakumar	Minister of Bengaluru Development and Town Planning, Government of Karnataka as the Vice-Chairperson	Deputy Chief Minister of Karnataka; Minister of Major and Medium Irrigation, Government of Karnataka; Member of Karnataka Legislative Assembly for Kanakapura Constituency (184)
3	M. Maheshwara Rao	Member Secretary as the Chief Commissioner; Managing Director, Bengaluru Solid Waste Management Limited (BSWML)	
Officials of the Greater Bengaluru Authority
4		Chief Town Planner	
5		Engineer in Chief	
Ex-officio members who are representatives of Greater Bengaluru Area at the Union Level
6	C. N. Manjunath	Member of Lok Sabha for Bengaluru Rural Constituency (23)	
7	Shobha Karandlaje	Member of Lok Sabha for Bengaluru North Constituency (24)	Union Minister of State in Ministry of Labour and Employment; Union Minister of State in Ministry of Micro, Small and Medium Enterprises
8	P. C. Mohan	Member of Lok Sabha for Bengaluru Central Constituency (25)	
9	Tejaswi Surya	Member of Lok Sabha for Bengaluru South Constituency (26)	
10	K. Sudhakar	Member of Lok Sabha for Chikkaballapura Constituency (27)	
11	Nirmala Sitharaman	Member of Rajya Sabha for Karnataka State Legislative Assembly Members Constituency (Registered Voter in Jayanagar)	Union Minister of Finance; Union Minister of Corporate Affairs
12	Jairam Ramesh	Member of Rajya Sabha for Karnataka State Legislative Assembly Members Constituency (Registered Voter in Shivajinagar)	
13	G.C. Chandrashekhar	Member of Rajya Sabha for Karnataka State Legislative Assembly Members Constituency (Registered Voter in Mahalaksmi Layout)	
14	K. Narayan	Member of Rajya Sabha for Karnataka State Legislative Assembly Members Constituency (Registered Voter in Padmanabhanagar)	
15	Jaggesh	Member of Rajya Sabha for Karnataka State Legislative Assembly Members Constituency (Registered Voter in Malleshwaram)	
Ex-officio members who are representatives of Greater Bengaluru Area at the State Level
16	S. R. Vishwanath	Member of Karnataka Legislative Assembly for Yelahanka Constituency (150)	
17	Byrati Basavaraj	Member of Karnataka Legislative Assembly for K. R. Pura Constituency (151)	
18	Krishna Byre Gowda	Member of Karnataka Legislative Assembly for Byatarayanapura Constituency (152)	Minister of Revenue (Excluding Muzrai), Government of Karnataka
19	S.T. Somashekhar	Member of Karnataka Legislative Assembly for Yeshvanthapura Constituency (153)	
20	Munirathna	Member of Karnataka Legislative Assembly for Rajarajeshwarinagar Constituency (154)	
21	S. Muniraju	Member of Karnataka Legislative Assembly for Dasarahalli Constituency (155)	
22	K. Gopalaiah	Member of Karnataka Legislative Assembly for Mahalakshmi Layout Constituency (156)	
23	C. N. Ashwath Narayan	Member of Karnataka Legislative Assembly for Malleshwaram Constituency (157)	
24	Byrathi Suresh	Member of Karnataka Legislative Assembly for Hebbal Constituency (158)	Minister of Urban Development & Town Planning (including KUWSDB & KUIDFC) (excluding Bengaluru City Development), Government of Karnataka
25	A. C. Srinivasa	Member of Karnataka Legislative Assembly for Pulakeshinagar Constituency (159)	
26	K. J. George	Member of Karnataka Legislative Assembly for Sarvagnanagar Constituency (160)	Minister of Energy, Government of Karnataka
27	S. Raghu	Member of Karnataka Legislative Assembly for C. V. Raman Nagar Constituency (161)	
28	Rizwan Arshad	Member of Karnataka Legislative Assembly for Shivajinagar Constituency (162)	
29	N. A. Harris	Member of Karnataka Legislative Assembly for Shanti Nagar Constituency (163)	
30	Dinesh Gundu Rao	Member of Karnataka Legislative Assembly for Gandhi Nagar Constituency (164)	Minister of Health & Family Welfare, Government of Karnataka
31	S. Suresh Kumar	Member of Karnataka Legislative Assembly for Rajaji Nagar Constituency (165)	
33	Priya Krishna	Member of Karnataka Legislative Assembly for Govindraj Nagar Constituency (166)	
34	M. Krishnappa	Member of Karnataka Legislative Assembly for Vijay Nagar Constituency (167)	
35	B. Z. Zameer Ahmed Khan	Member of Karnataka Legislative Assembly for Chamrajpet Constituency (168)	Minister of Housing, Government of Karnataka; Minister of Minority Welfare, Government of Karnataka; Minister of Wakf, Government of Karnataka
36	Uday Garudachar	Member of Karnataka Legislative Assembly for Chickpet Constituency (169)	
37	L. A. Ravi Subramanya	Member of Karnataka Legislative Assembly for Basavanagudi Constituency (170)	
38	R. Ashoka	Member of Karnataka Legislative Assembly for Padmanabhanagar Constituency (171)	
39	Ramalinga Reddy	Member of Karnataka Legislative Assembly for B.T.M Layout Constituency (172)	Minister of Transport, Government of Karnataka; Minister of Muzrai, Government of Karnataka
40	C. K. Ramamurthy	Member of Karnataka Legislative Assembly for Jayanagar Constituency (173)	
41	Manjula S	Member of Karnataka Legislative Assembly for Mahadevapura Constituency (174)	
42	M. Satish Reddy	Member of Karnataka Legislative Assembly for Bommanahalli Constituency (175)	
43	M. Krishnappa	Member of Karnataka Legislative Assembly for Bengaluru South Constituency (176)	
44	K. Govindraj	Member of Karnataka Legislative Council for Karnataka State Legislative Assembly Members Constituency (Registered Voter in Shanti Nagar)	
45	N. Ravikumar	Member of Karnataka Legislative Council for Karnataka State Legislative Assembly Members Constituency (Registered Voter in Shivajinagar)	
46	T.N. Javarayi Gowda	Member of Karnataka Legislative Council for Karnataka State Legislative Assembly Members Constituency (Registered Voter in Yesvanthapura)	
47	M. Nagaraju Yadav	Member of Karnataka Legislative Council for Karnataka State Legislative Assembly Members Constituency (Registered Voter in Pulakeshinagar)	
48	B. K. Hariprasad	Member of Karnataka Legislative Council for Karnataka State Legislative Assembly Members Constituency (Registered Voter in Malleshwaram)	
49	K. Naseer Ahmed	Member of Karnataka Legislative Council for Karnataka State Legislative Assembly Members Constituency (Registered Voter in Hebbal)	
50	S Keshava Prasad	Member of Karnataka Legislative Council for Karnataka State Legislative Assembly Members Constituency (Registered Voter in Yelahanka)	
51	M. T. B. Nagaraj	Member of Karnataka Legislative Council for Karnataka State Legislative Assembly Members Constituency (Registered Voter in Mahadevapura)	
52	T.A. Sharavana	Member of Karnataka Legislative Council for Karnataka State Legislative Assembly Members Constituency (Registered Voter in Basavanagudi)	
53	H. S. Gopinath Reddy	Member of Karnataka Legislative Council for Bengaluru Urban Local Authorities Constituency	
54	Ramoji Gowda	Member of Karnataka Legislative Council for Bengaluru Graduates Constituency	
55	Puttanna	Member of Karnataka Legislative Council for Bengaluru Teachers Constituency	
56	M. R. Seetharam	Nominated Member of Karnataka Legislative Council (Registered Voter in Malleshwaram)	
Ex-officio members who are representatives of Greater Bengaluru Area at the City Level
57		Mayor of Bengaluru Central City Corporation (BCCC)	
58		Mayor of Bengaluru North City Corporation (BNCC)	
59		Mayor of Bengaluru South City Corporation (BSCC)	
60		Mayor of Bengaluru East City Corporation (BECC)	
61		Mayor of Bengaluru West City Corporation (BWCC)	
Ex-officio members who are Managing directors, Commissioners and Executives in various organization in Greater Bengaluru Area
62	M.B. Rajesh Gowda	Chief Commissioner of Bengaluru Development Authority (BDA)	
63	Ram Prasath Manohar. V	Chairman of Bengaluru Water Supply and Sewerage Board (BWSSB)	
64	Ramachandran. R	Managing Director of Bengaluru Metropolitan Transport Corporation (BMTC)	
65	J. Ravishankar	Managing Director of Bengaluru Metro Rail Corporation Limited - Namma Metro (BMRCL)	
66	Shiva Shankara. N	Managing Director, Bengaluru Electricity Supply Company Limited (BESCOM)	
67	Jagadeesha G	Deputy Commissioner, Bengaluru Urban District	
68	Seemanth Kumar Singh	Commissioner of Police, Bengaluru City Police (BCP)	
69	M. Deepa Cholan	Chief Executive Officer of Bengaluru Metropolitan Land Transport Authority (BMLTA); Commissioner, Directorate of Urban Land Transport (DULT)	
70	Rajendra. P Cholan	Metropolitan Commissioner, Bengaluru Metropolitan Region Development Authority (BMRDA)	
71	Rajendra. P Cholan	Chief Commissioner of Bengaluru Central City Corporation (BCCC)	
72	Sunil Kumar. P	Chief Commissioner of Bengaluru North City Corporation (BNCC)	
73	Ramesh. K. N	Chief Commissioner of Bengaluru South City Corporation (BSCC)	
74	Ramesh. D. S	Chief Commissioner of Bengaluru East City Corporation (BECC)	
75	Rajendra. K. V	Chief Commissioner of Bengaluru West City Corporation (BWCC)	

== City Corporations under GBA ==
The Greater Bengaluru Governance Bill, 2024 provides for the division of the former Bruhat Bengaluru Mahanagara Palike into up to seven city corporations, each with an elected mayor and council. Each corporation will be responsible for providing basic civic services within its respective jurisdiction.

As of May 2025, the GBA has not officially demarcated the new Municipal Corporation Boundaries.

Karnataka government notifies draft on setting up five corporations under GBA.

City Corporations under Greater Bengaluru Authority
No.	Name	Area	No. of Wards	Headquarters	Lok Sabha Constituencies	Legislative Assembly Constituencies
1	Bengaluru Central City Corporation (BCCC)	78 km^{2} (30 sq mi)	63	Hudson Circle: Hudson Circle Zonal Office; Ashok Nagara Zonal Office	Bengaluru Central	C. V. Raman Nagar
1	Bengaluru Central City Corporation (BCCC)	78 km^{2} (30 sq mi)	63	Hudson Circle: Hudson Circle Zonal Office; Ashok Nagara Zonal Office	Bengaluru Central	Chamarajpet
1	Bengaluru Central City Corporation (BCCC)	78 km^{2} (30 sq mi)	63	Hudson Circle: Hudson Circle Zonal Office; Ashok Nagara Zonal Office	Bengaluru Central	Gandhi Nagar
1	Bengaluru Central City Corporation (BCCC)	78 km^{2} (30 sq mi)	63	Hudson Circle: Hudson Circle Zonal Office; Ashok Nagara Zonal Office	Bengaluru Central	Shanti Nagar
1	Bengaluru Central City Corporation (BCCC)	78 km^{2} (30 sq mi)	63	Hudson Circle: Hudson Circle Zonal Office; Ashok Nagara Zonal Office	Bengaluru Central	Shivajinagar
1	Bengaluru Central City Corporation (BCCC)	78 km^{2} (30 sq mi)	63	Hudson Circle: Hudson Circle Zonal Office; Ashok Nagara Zonal Office	Bengaluru South	Chickpet
2	Bengaluru North City Corporation (BNCC)	158 km^{2} (61 sq mi)	72	Yelahanka: Yelahanka Zonal Office; Dasarahalli Zonal Office	Bengaluru North	Byatarayanapura (part of)
2	Bengaluru North City Corporation (BNCC)	158 km^{2} (61 sq mi)	72	Yelahanka: Yelahanka Zonal Office; Dasarahalli Zonal Office	Bengaluru North	Dasarahalli (part of)
2	Bengaluru North City Corporation (BNCC)	158 km^{2} (61 sq mi)	72	Yelahanka: Yelahanka Zonal Office; Dasarahalli Zonal Office	Bengaluru North	Hebbal
2	Bengaluru North City Corporation (BNCC)	158 km^{2} (61 sq mi)	72	Yelahanka: Yelahanka Zonal Office; Dasarahalli Zonal Office	Bengaluru North	Pulakeshinagar
2	Bengaluru North City Corporation (BNCC)	158 km^{2} (61 sq mi)	72	Yelahanka: Yelahanka Zonal Office; Dasarahalli Zonal Office	Bengaluru Rural	Rajarajeshwarinagar (part of)
2	Bengaluru North City Corporation (BNCC)	158 km^{2} (61 sq mi)	72	Yelahanka: Yelahanka Zonal Office; Dasarahalli Zonal Office	Bengaluru Central	Sarvagnanagar
2	Bengaluru North City Corporation (BNCC)	158 km^{2} (61 sq mi)	72	Yelahanka: Yelahanka Zonal Office; Dasarahalli Zonal Office	Chikkaballapura	Yelahanka (part of)
3	Bengaluru South City Corporation (BSCC)	147 km^{2} (57 sq mi)	72	Jayanagara: Jayanagara Zonal Office; Bommanahalli Zonal Office	Bengaluru South	B.T.M Layout
3	Bengaluru South City Corporation (BSCC)	147 km^{2} (57 sq mi)	72	Jayanagara: Jayanagara Zonal Office; Bommanahalli Zonal Office	Bengaluru South	Bommanahalli
3	Bengaluru South City Corporation (BSCC)	147 km^{2} (57 sq mi)	72	Jayanagara: Jayanagara Zonal Office; Bommanahalli Zonal Office	Bengaluru South	Jayanagar
3	Bengaluru South City Corporation (BSCC)	147 km^{2} (57 sq mi)	72	Jayanagara: Jayanagara Zonal Office; Bommanahalli Zonal Office	Bengaluru South	Padmanabhanagar (part of)
3	Bengaluru South City Corporation (BSCC)	147 km^{2} (57 sq mi)	72	Jayanagara: Jayanagara Zonal Office; Bommanahalli Zonal Office	Bengaluru Rural	Bengaluru South (part of)
3	Bengaluru South City Corporation (BSCC)	147 km^{2} (57 sq mi)	72	Jayanagara: Jayanagara Zonal Office; Bommanahalli Zonal Office	Bengaluru Rural	Rajarajeshwarinagar (part of)
3	Bengaluru South City Corporation (BSCC)	147 km^{2} (57 sq mi)	72	Jayanagara: Jayanagara Zonal Office; Bommanahalli Zonal Office	Bengaluru Central	Mahadevapura (part of)
3	Bengaluru South City Corporation (BSCC)	147 km^{2} (57 sq mi)	72	Jayanagara: Jayanagara Zonal Office; Bommanahalli Zonal Office	Bengaluru North	Yeshvanthapura (part of)
4	Bengaluru East City Corporation (BECC)	168 km^{2} (65 sq mi)	50	Mahadevapura: Mahadevapura Zonal Office; K. R. Pura Zonal Office	Bengaluru North	K. R. Pura
4	Bengaluru East City Corporation (BECC)	168 km^{2} (65 sq mi)	50	Mahadevapura: Mahadevapura Zonal Office; K. R. Pura Zonal Office	Bengaluru Central	Mahadevapura (part of)
5	Bengaluru West City Corporation (BWCC)	161 km^{2} (62 sq mi)	111	Rajarajeshwari Nagara: Rajarajeshwari Nagara Zonal Office; Chandra Layout Zonal Office	Bengaluru South	Basavanagudi
5	Bengaluru West City Corporation (BWCC)	161 km^{2} (62 sq mi)	111	Rajarajeshwari Nagara: Rajarajeshwari Nagara Zonal Office; Chandra Layout Zonal Office	Bengaluru South	Govindraja Nagar
5	Bengaluru West City Corporation (BWCC)	161 km^{2} (62 sq mi)	111	Rajarajeshwari Nagara: Rajarajeshwari Nagara Zonal Office; Chandra Layout Zonal Office	Bengaluru South	Padmanabhanagar (part of)
5	Bengaluru West City Corporation (BWCC)	161 km^{2} (62 sq mi)	111	Rajarajeshwari Nagara: Rajarajeshwari Nagara Zonal Office; Chandra Layout Zonal Office	Bengaluru South	Vijay Nagar
5	Bengaluru West City Corporation (BWCC)	161 km^{2} (62 sq mi)	111	Rajarajeshwari Nagara: Rajarajeshwari Nagara Zonal Office; Chandra Layout Zonal Office	Bengaluru North	Dasarahalli (part of)
5	Bengaluru West City Corporation (BWCC)	161 km^{2} (62 sq mi)	111	Rajarajeshwari Nagara: Rajarajeshwari Nagara Zonal Office; Chandra Layout Zonal Office	Bengaluru North	Mahalakshmi Layout
5	Bengaluru West City Corporation (BWCC)	161 km^{2} (62 sq mi)	111	Rajarajeshwari Nagara: Rajarajeshwari Nagara Zonal Office; Chandra Layout Zonal Office	Bengaluru North	Malleshwaram
5	Bengaluru West City Corporation (BWCC)	161 km^{2} (62 sq mi)	111	Rajarajeshwari Nagara: Rajarajeshwari Nagara Zonal Office; Chandra Layout Zonal Office	Bengaluru North	Yeshvanthapura (part of)
5	Bengaluru West City Corporation (BWCC)	161 km^{2} (62 sq mi)	111	Rajarajeshwari Nagara: Rajarajeshwari Nagara Zonal Office; Chandra Layout Zonal Office	Bengaluru Central	Rajaji Nagar
Total		712 km^{2} (275 sq mi)	368			

== Functions ==
The GBA was established to serve as a metropolitan-level coordinating and planning body for the Greater Bengaluru Area.

Under the Greater Bengaluru Governance Bill, 2024, the Authority is vested with the following functions:

- Strategic planning for the metropolitan area, including the preparation and approval of comprehensive and spatial development plans that cut across individual municipal jurisdictions.
- Inter-agency coordination, particularly among parastatal bodies such as the Bengaluru Development Authority (BDA), Bengaluru Water Supply and Sewerage Board (BWSSB), Bengaluru Metro Rail Corporation Limited (BMRCL), and others.
- Approval and oversight of large-scale infrastructure projects that span across municipal boundaries, ensuring alignment with the city's long-term development vision.
- Equitable distribution of financial and natural resources among the municipal corporations under its jurisdiction.
- Monitoring and performance evaluation of local governments and urban service providers within the Greater Bengaluru Area.
- Conflict resolution between municipal corporations, civic agencies, and departments involved in urban governance.
- Advisory and technical support to municipal corporations on matters of policy, technology adoption, and citizen engagement.
- Disaster management coordination in partnership with relevant state and metropolitan agencies.
