= Jayaprakash (name) =

Jayaprakash or Jaya Prakash is an Indian masculine given name and surname. Notable people with the surname include:

== Given name ==
- K. Jayaprakash Hegde (born 1952), Indian politician
- Jayaprakash Manikandan (born 1998), Indian cricketer
- Jayaprakash Muliyil, Indian epidemiologist
- Jayaprakash Narayan (1902–1979), Indian activist
- Jayaprakash Radhakrishnan, Indian film director
- Sowkoor Jayaprakash Shetty (1935–2015), Indian lawyer and politician

=== Jaya Prakash ===
- Jaya Prakash Malla, 18th-century King of Kantipur
- Jaya Prakash Narayana (born 1956), Indian politician and activist
- Jaya Prakash Reddy (1946–2020), Indian actor
- Jayaprakash (actor)

== Surname ==
- Anjana Jayaprakash, Indian actress
- Arani Jayaprakash (born 1979), Indian cricketer and umpire
- Mohit Mayur Jayaprakash (born 1993), Indian tennis player
- V. Jayaprakash, Indian film director
- Jayaprakash (actor) (V. Jayaprakash; born 1962), Indian actor and producer

== See also ==
- Jayaprakash Nagar
