= Bangalore Agenda Task Force =

1999 public–private partnership in Bangalore, India

The Bangalore Agenda Task Force (BATF) was a public–private partnership from 1999 to 2004 in Bangalore, India, at the direction of the Chief Minister of Karnataka. The purpose of the taskforce was to bring in business and civic leaders on a pro-bono basis to design a development agenda for the city and suggest ways in which the city's infrastructure and service delivery might be upgraded and improved according to best practice systems elsewhere. The purpose of the taskforce was to build government capacity through partnership between citizens, corporates and the city's main administrative agencies – the BMP, BDA, BMTC, BWSSB, BESCOM, BSNL, and Bangalore Police. The BATF was a particularly influential task force, transcending an 'advisory role' to mobilise private resources and catalyze significant changes in the agencies with which it engaged.

== Background & History ==
The BATF was the brainchild of Infosys CEO Nandan Nilekani who would invest Rs 2 crore ($300,000) into the project over five years. The motivation for the project was to maintain Bangalore's position as a leader in information technology in India against growing competition from other Indian cities such as Hyderabad.

Commencing in 1999, the BATF commissioned a survey by an independent organisation SOFRES - MODE to identify top citizen concerns. Following this, the first year focus was largely on short term works capable of yielding quick visible results for greater confidence besides generating experience for expanding and consolidating on long term infrastructure projects from year. The initial task, therefore, for the BATF and the stakeholders was to sit together and agree on an approach and formulate projects and programmes.

The BATF commenced strongly, but over the course of its operation ran into political difficulties that saw many of its more ambitious proposals sidelined or shelved.

== Methodology ==
The philosophy behind the BATF was of working within government institutions to improve their performance. It did not seek to create parallel institutions to bypass government agencies or advocate for the contracting out of major government responsibilities to the private sector. It sought solutions that whilst perhaps considered imperfect, would improve service delivery in an immediate and practical sense.

The BATF had little or no formal authority over any of the agencies with which they were dealing. Instead they applied informal pressure on agency heads to engage and improve service delivery, offering private sector skills and expertise at their own expense. Agency officials retained full autonomy to reject any BATF proposals.

== Membership ==
The BATF team comprised experts from various fields across all sectors, appointed by the Karnataka Govt. The team was headed by Nandan Nilekani and members included the likes of Naresh Venkataramanan, Kalpana Kar, Ramesh Ramanathan, Ravichander, Suresh Heblikar, Anuradha Hegde, Late H. Narasimhaiah, Sunil Shelar, etc. The members contributed to the city's development by way of sharing knowledge. The BATF office was located in Alexandria Street, Bangalore and the infrastructure was created & funded by the Chairman of BATF, itself. There were appointed technical staff through members of BATF for each of the programmes undertaken by it. The staff members were selected on the basis of expertise (skillset). These teams toiled in the background for all the programmes initiated by the BATF. Some of the key technical members were Subramanya M. R., handling road improvement projects, Deepa Hurali, handling Nirmala Bangalore and Bus Shelter projects, Milind Nirmal, handling self-assessment tax with BMP, Gopi Prasad, Sushma Nirmal, with Street Furniture, Road Signage projects, Sanjeev, with one-way traffic and road safety. Sheena, Soosai & Manjula were working on the Swachha Bangalore project. Some of the project details can be referred to in the respective web links.

== Achievements ==
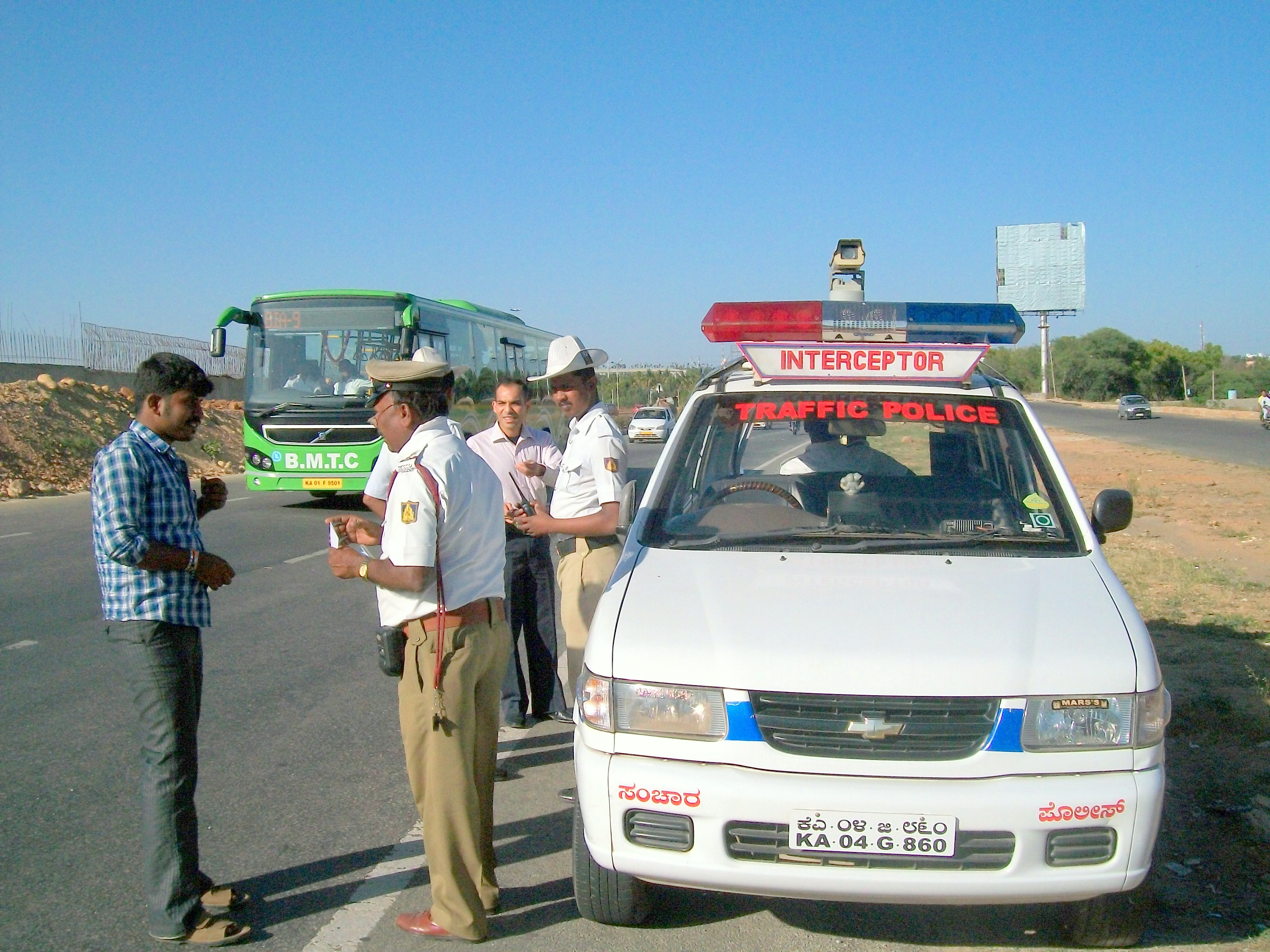
The BATF successfully advocated for all traffic fine revenue to be returned to the police budget for traffic management projects.

BATF brought visibility to many civic issues and helped creating awareness among the public. The projects were seeds sown which continue to showcase the strength of PPP projects after a decade. Nirmala toilets showcased the quality of facilities, O&M that can be maintained by government organisation in a third world country like India. Beautification of parks, signages brought in the international look to the city. Today this Adopt a Park concept has moved beyond and one can notice there are various programmes that BBMP and other municipal bodies are following like Lake Improvement programmes. It is the concepts that were sown and which have been accepted even after BATF ceases to exist. The Nirmala toilet designs and the toilet designs adopted by KSRTC in their various cities changed the design concepts, material and specifications used which has led to facilities that are easy to maintain and hygienic. Bus Shelter programme helped to realise the potential of advertisement revenues to maintain which providing the required facility for commuter in terms of shelter and route maps.

- The BATF advocated for the BBMP to introduce door-to-door waste collection, which was implemented in 2001.
- The financial systems of several city agencies were computerized with fund-based accounting introduced at the expense of a BATF member. This made it possible for the agencies to gain a full record of their accounts for the first time and more easily identify waste and corruption. These reforms were so successful that 80% of it was included in India's handbook of best practice produced by the Comptroller and Auditor General.
- They also provide public toilets and shower stalls for poor people.
- Successfully advocated for revenue generated by traffic fines to go back into the traffic police budget for expenditure on infrastructure to improve traffic management. Bangalore is the only city in India that uses traffic fines for investment in traffic management.
- Worked with the Police, BMP and MTC to developer a scientific traffic model called the Central Management Plan.
- Mobilised 1.5 crore investment from Mr Irfan Razak of Prestige to improve the road from Dairy Circle to Hosur Road.

== Legacy ==
The BATF ended formally in 2004, however the influence of the reform agenda it advocated has continued. Former members have been influential in the establishment of the Jawaharlal Nehru National Urban Renewal Mission (JNNURM) and civic agencies such as Janaagraha, which includes the Jana Urban Space Foundation.

== See also ==
- Kasturirangan Committee (2008 - ?)
- Agenda for Bengaluru Infrastructure and Development Task Force (ABIDe) (2010 - ?)
- Karnataka Information Communication Technology Group (2013)
- Bangalore Vision Group (May 2016 - June 2018)
- Bengaluru Blueprint Action Group (April 28 2016 - June 2018)
- Bangalore Metropolitan Planning Committee (MPC)
