= Muliyil =

Muliyil is both a Malayali masculine given name and surname. Notable people with the name include:

== Given name ==
- Muliyil Krishnan (1845–1901), Indian linguist

== Surname ==
- Jayaprakash Muliyil, Indian epidemiologist
