= List of Indian metropolitan areas by GDP =

The following is a list of metropolitan areas in India by their nominal gross domestic product (GDP) and their contribution to their respective states and union territories. The metropolitan area definition is based on the districts of the urban agglomeration. The GDP of India as of 2022-23 is ₹269.5 trillion (US$3.26 trillion), and the top 50 cities contribute to nearly 40 percent of the national GDP.

Percent of contribution of metropolitan areas in National GDP of India
1. Delhi (5.71%)
2. Mumbai (4.98%)
3. Bengaluru (3.45%)
4. Chennai (2.81%)
5. Hyderabad (2.45%)
6. Kolkata (2.33%)
7. Ahmedabad (1.86%)
8. Pune (1.55%)
9. Surat (1.30%)
10. Coimbatore (1.00%)
11. Rest of the top 50 cities (13.0%)
12. Rest of urban areas (16.0%)
13. Rural India (44.6%)
Top 10 metropolitan areas by GDP in India

Indian urban areas by nominal GDP for 2022-23
S.no	Metropolitan area	State/UT	Nominal GDP (2022–23)	Contribution to state GDP (%)	Contribution to national GDP (%)	Ref.
1	Delhi NCR (Note: Contains Delhi NCT, Noida, Greater Noida, Ghaziabad, Gurgaon, Faridabad)	Delhi NCT Haryana Uttar Pradesh	₹15,375.37 billion (US$186.14 billion)	35.9	5.71	
2	Mumbai (MMR) (Note: Includes Mumbai City, Mumbai Suburban, and parts of Thane, Palghar and Raigad districts)	Maharashtra	₹13,417.15 billion (US$162.44 billion)	36.6	4.98	
3	Bengaluru (Note: Includes Bangalore urban, Bangalore rural, Ramanagara districts)	Karnataka	₹9,285.52 billion (US$112.42 billion)	40.91	3.45	
4	Chennai (Note: Includes Chennai, and parts of Thiruvallur, Kancheepuram, Chengalpattu districts)	Tamil Nadu	₹7,560.56 billion (US$91.53 billion)	31.59	2.81	
5	Hyderabad (Note: Includes Hyderabad, and parts of Rangareddy, Medchal-Malkajgiri, Sangareddy districts)	Telangana	₹6,613.1 billion (US$80.06 billion)	50.56	2.45	
6	Kolkata (Note: Includes Kolkata, and parts of Hooghly, Howrah, North 24 Parganas, South 24 Parganass)	West Bengal	₹6,212.51 billion (US$75.21 billion)	40.56	2.33	
7	Ahmedabad (Note: Includes Ahmedabad and parts of Gandhinagar district)	Gujarat	₹5,557.02 billion (US$67.28 billion)	25.22	2.06	
8	Pune (Note: Includes Pune district)	Maharashtra	₹4,181.04 billion (US$50.62 billion)	11.47	1.55	
9	Surat	Gujarat	₹3,497.27 billion (US$42.34 billion)	15.87	1.30	
10	Coimbatore-Tiruppur (Note: Includes Coimbatore, Tiruppur and parts of Coimbatore and Tiruppur districts)	Tamil Nadu	₹2,684.22 billion (US$32.5 billion)	11.22	1	
11	Visakhapatnam (Note: Includes Visakhapatnam, and parts of Visakhapatnam and Vizianagaram districts)	Andhra Pradesh	₹1,740.5 billion (US$21.07 billion)	13.35	0.65	
12	Vadodara	Gujarat	₹1,708.06 billion (US$20.68 billion)	7.75	0.63	
13	Nagpur	Maharashtra	₹1,686.03 billion (US$20.41 billion)	4.63	0.57	
14	Jaipur	Rajasthan	₹1,497.67 billion (US$18.13 billion)	11	0.55	
15	Kochi	Kerala	₹1,303.53 billion (US$15.78 billion)	13.42	0.51	
16	Thrissur	Kerala	₹1,300.73 billion (US$15.75 billion)	10.35	0.39	
17	Andhra Pradesh Capital Region (Note: Contains Amaravati, Vijayawada & Guntur)	Andhra Pradesh	₹1,221.74 billion (US$14.79 billion)	9.38	0.45	
18	Rajkot	Gujarat	₹1,163.76 billion (US$14.09 billion)	5.28	0.43	
19	Cuttack-Bhubaneswar (Note: Includes Cuttack & Bhubaneswar and parts of Khordha and Cuttack districts)	Odisha	₹1,156.40 billion (US$14 billion)	11.8	0.43	
20	Salem	Tamil Nadu	₹1,107.68 billion (US$13.41 billion)	4.07	0.22	
21	Malappuram	Kerala	₹1,084.92 billion (US$12.97 billion)	10.22	0.40	
22	Nashik	Maharashtra	₹1,030.56 billion (US$12.48 billion)	2.16	0.32	
23	Chandigarh	Chandigarh, Haryana, Punjab	₹966.2 billion (US$11.7 billion)	5.62	0.35	
24	Prayagraj	Uttar Pradesh	₹964.56 billion [US$11.53 billion]	3.3	0.3	
25	Kozhikode	Kerala	₹963.00 billion (US$11.51 billion)	9.99	0.38	
26	Thirvananthapuram	Kerala	₹956.79 billion (US$11.58 billion)	9.86	0.37	
27	Patna	Bihar	₹918.3 billion (US$11.12 billion)	12.3	0.34	
28	Kollam	Kerala	₹908.59 billion (US$11 billion)	9.49	0.36	
29	Lucknow	Uttar Pradesh	₹902.22 billion (US$10.92 billion)	3.95	0.33	
30	Madurai	Tamil Nadu	₹870.9 billion (US$10.54 billion)	3.2	0.27	
31	Asansol-Durgapur (Note: Includes Asansol Durgapur & Raniganj)	West Bengal	₹865.44 billion (US$10.48 billion)	5.65	0.32	
32	Indore	Madhya Pradesh	₹827.66 billion (US$10.02 billion)	6.64	0.31	
33	Raipur (Note: Includes Raipur, Durg, and Bhilai)	Chhattisgarh	₹823.64 billion (US$9.97 billion)	17.74	0.31	
34	Erode (Note: Includes Erode and parts of Erode and Namakkal districts)	Tamil Nadu	₹816.47 billion (US$9.88 billion)	3	0.23	
35	Aurangabad	Maharashtra	₹786.57 billion (US$9.52 billion)	2.16	0.22	
36	Mangaluru	Karnataka	₹783.74 billion (US$9.49 billion)	2.25	0.29	
37	Solapur	Maharashtra	₹757.44 billion (US$9.17 billion)	2.08	0.29	
38	Kolhapur	Maharashtra	₹731.95 billion (US$8.86 billion)	2.01	0.28	
39	Agra	Uttar Pradesh	₹723.7 billion (US$8.76 billion)	3.17	0.27	
40	Ludhiana	Punjab	₹718.72 billion (US$8.7 billion)	10.55	0.27	
41	Kannur	Kerala	₹713.45 billion (US$8.64 billion)	6.97	0.26	
42	Kanpur	Uttar Pradesh	₹676.1 billion (US$8.19 billion)	2.96	0.25	
43	Jamnagar	Gujarat	₹650.00 billion (US$7.87 billion)	2.95	0.24	
44	Mysuru	Karnataka	₹641.89 billion (US$7.77 billion)	2.7	0.23	
45	Tiruchirappalli	Tamil Nadu	₹628.88 billion (US$7.61 billion)	2.63	0.23	
46	Meerut	Uttar Pradesh	₹584.83 billion (US$7.08 billion)	2.56	0.22	
47	Bhopal	Madhya Pradesh	₹564.65 billion (US$6.84 billion)	4.53	0.21	
48	Jabalpur	Madhya Pradesh	₹543.46 billion (US$6.58 billion)	4.36	0.2	
49	Sangli	Maharashtra	₹538.95 billion (US$6.52 billion)	1.48	0.2	
50	Vellore (Note: Includes Vellore and parts of Vellore and Ranipet districts)	Tamil Nadu	₹508.93 billion (US$6.16 billion)	1.87	0.18	
51	Hubli–Dharwad	Karnataka	₹476.07 billion (US$5.76 billion)	2.33	0.2	
52	Dhanbad	Jharkhand	₹442.01 billion (US$5.35 billion)	10.59	0.17	
53	Kottayam	Kerala	₹426.39 billion (US$5.16 billion)	4.54	0.19	
54	Jamshedpur	Jharkhand	₹380.22 billion (US$4.6 billion)	9.11	0.15	
