= Jayaprakash =

Jayaprakash may refer to:

- Jayaprakash (actor), Indian actor and producer
- Jayaprakash (name), an Indian masculine given name and surname
