= Yelahanka Assembly constituency =

Constituency of the Karnataka legislative assembly in India

Coordinates: 13.118°N 77.599°E

Yelahanka
- Constituency No. 150 for the Karnataka Legislative Assembly
- Map of Assembly constituency

Constituency details
- Country: India
- Region: South India
- State: Karnataka
- District: Bangalore Urban
- Lok Sabha constituency: Chikkaballapur
- Established: 1961
- Total electors: 439,087 (2023)
- Reservation: None

Member of Legislative Assembly
- 16th Karnataka Legislative Assembly
- Incumbent S. R. Vishwanath
- Party: Bharatiya Janata Party
- Elected year: 2023
- Preceded by: B. Prasanna Kumar

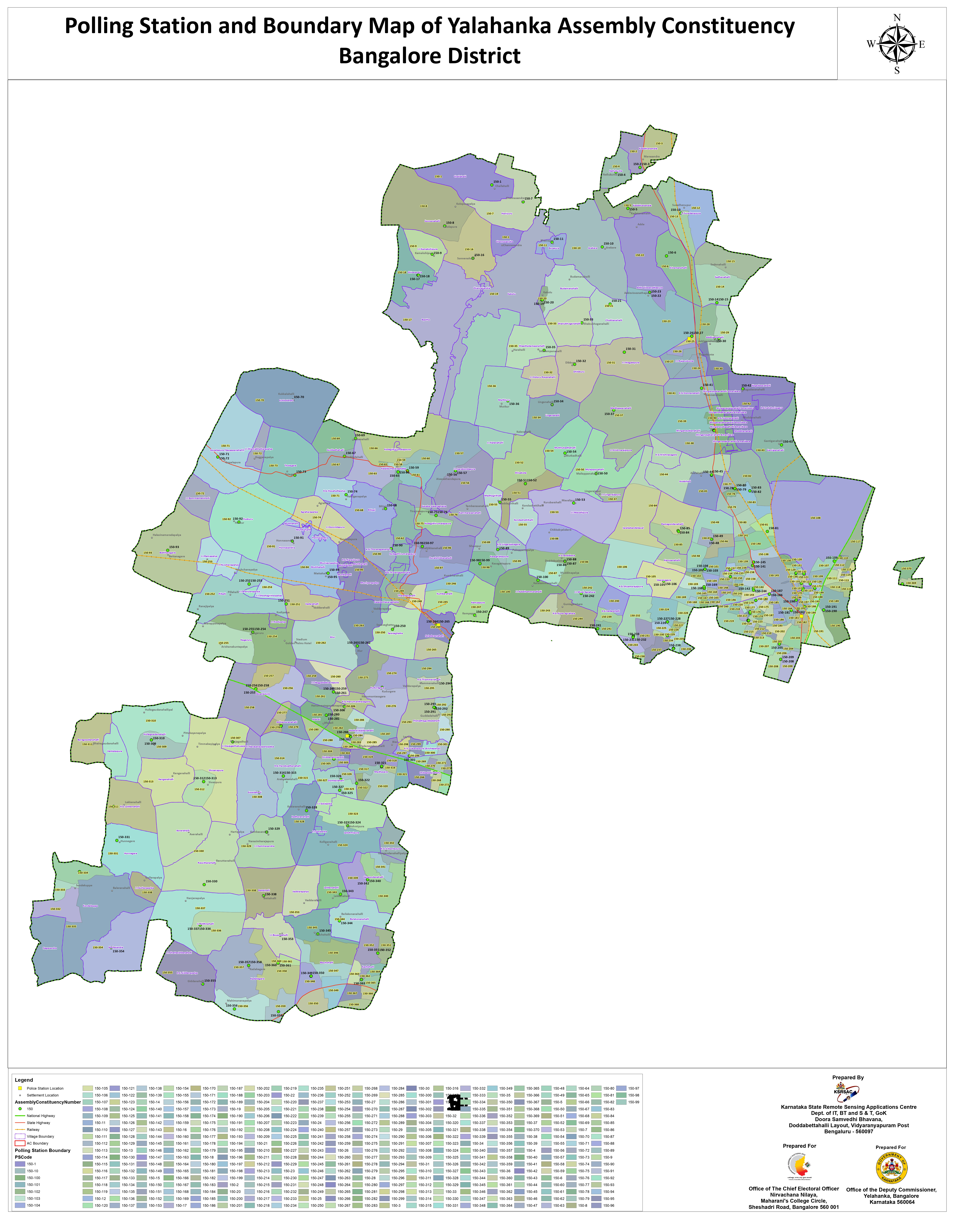
Yelahanka Assembly Constituency

Yelahanka Assembly constituency is one of the 224 constituencies in the Legislative Assembly of Karnataka, a southern state of India. Yelahanka is also part of Chikballapur Lok Sabha constituency.

== Members of the Legislative Assembly ==
Election	Member	Party
1962	Y. Ramakrishna	Indian National Congress
1967	B. Narayanaswamappa	Independent politician
1972	A. M. Suryanarayana Gowda	Indian National Congress
1978	B. Basavalingappa	Indian National Congress
1983	V. Sreenivasan	Janata Party
1985	B. Basavalingappa	Indian National Congress
1989	B. Basavalingappa	Indian National Congress
1993 By-election (Note: Due to death of B. Basavalingappa)	B. Prasanna Kumar	Indian National Congress
1994	M. H. Jayaprakashanarayan	Janata Dal
1996 By-election (Note: Due to death of M. H. Jayaprakashanarayan)	B. Prasanna Kumar	Indian National Congress
1999	B. Prasanna Kumar	Indian National Congress
2004	B. Prasanna Kumar	Indian National Congress
2008	S. R. Vishwanath	Bharatiya Janata Party
2013	S. R. Vishwanath	Bharatiya Janata Party
2018	S. R. Vishwanath	Bharatiya Janata Party
2023	S. R. Vishwanath	Bharatiya Janata Party

== Election results ==
=== Assembly Election 2023 ===
2023 Karnataka Legislative Assembly election : Yelahanka
Party	Candidate	Votes	%	±%
BJP	S. R. Vishwanath	141,538	51.50	▲2.50
INC	Keshava Rajanna. B	77,428	28.18	▲11.27
JD(S)	Munegowda. M	44,491	16.19	▼15.47
UPP	Ashwath. M. M	2,944	1.07	New
NOTA	None of the above	2,238	0.81	▼0.03
Margin of victory		64,110	23.33	▲5.99
Turnout		274,963	62.62	▼0.64
Total valid votes		274,807		
Registered electors		439,087		▲13.27
BJP hold		Swing	▲2.50	

=== Assembly Election 2018 ===
2018 Karnataka Legislative Assembly election : Yelahanka
Party	Candidate	Votes	%	±%
BJP	S. R. Vishwanath	120,110	49.00	▲11.28
JD(S)	A. M. Hanumanthegowda	77,607	31.66	▲3.13
INC	M. N. Gopalakrishna	41,449	16.91	▼9.25
NOTA	None of the above	2,051	0.84	New
Margin of victory		42,503	17.34	▲8.15
Turnout		245,228	63.26	▼3.67
Total valid votes		245,135		
Registered electors		387,663		▲32.19
BJP hold		Swing	▲11.28	

=== Assembly Election 2013 ===
2013 Karnataka Legislative Assembly election : Yelahanka
Party	Candidate	Votes	%	±%
BJP	S. R. Vishwanath	75,507	37.72	▼3.64
JD(S)	B. Chandrappa	57,110	28.53	▲3.39
INC	M. N. Gopalakrishna	52,372	26.16	▼4.33
KJP	Venugopal Rao	3,736	1.87	New
BSP	Eranna. G	1,538	0.77	▼0.41
Margin of victory		18,397	9.19	▼1.68
Turnout		196,282	66.93	▲5.86
Total valid votes		200,184		
Registered electors		293,264		▲21.47
BJP hold		Swing	▼3.64	

=== Assembly Election 2008 ===
2008 Karnataka Legislative Assembly election : Yelahanka
Party	Candidate	Votes	%	±%
BJP	S. R. Vishwanath	60,975	41.36	▲0.57
INC	B. Chandrappa	44,953	30.49	▼14.78
JD(S)	E. Krishnappa	37,070	25.14	▲13.88
BSP	Sunitha. A. H	1,740	1.18	New
Independent	K. V. Vishwanath	1,218	0.83	New
Margin of victory		16,022	10.87	▲6.40
Turnout		147,435	61.07	▲10.72
Total valid votes		147,435		
Registered electors		241,439		▼62.00
BJP gain from INC		Swing	▼3.91	

=== Assembly Election 2004 ===
2004 Karnataka Legislative Assembly election : Yelahanka
Party	Candidate	Votes	%	±%
INC	B. Prasanna Kumar	144,806	45.27	▼5.36
BJP	Munikrishna. C	130,494	40.79	▲6.21
JD(S)	Shivaraj. V	36,033	11.26	▲8.28
Kannada Nadu Party	Rajendra. S. V	2,003	0.63	New
Margin of victory		14,312	4.47	▼11.57
Turnout		319,903	50.35	▲1.26
Total valid votes		319,893		
Registered electors		635,308		▲26.65
INC hold		Swing	▼5.36	

=== Assembly Election 1999 ===
1999 Karnataka Legislative Assembly election : Yelahanka
Party	Candidate	Votes	%	±%
INC	B. Prasanna Kumar	124,593	50.63	▼17.70
BJP	C. Muniyappa	85,108	34.58	▲2.91
JD(U)	Shivaraj. V	19,604	7.97	New
JD(S)	Ramakrishna. M	7,325	2.98	New
AIADMK	R. Eazilan	2,738	1.11	New
Independent	R. Saravanan	2,536	1.03	New
Margin of victory		39,485	16.04	▼20.62
Turnout		246,256	49.09	
Total valid votes		246,093		
Registered electors		501,637		
INC hold		Swing	▼17.70	

=== Assembly By-election 1996 ===
1996 Karnataka Legislative Assembly by-election : Yelahanka
Party	Candidate	Votes	%	±%
INC	B. Prasanna Kumar	93,125	68.33	▲36.39
BJP	C. Muniyappa	43,158	31.67	▲2.36
Margin of victory		49,967	36.66	▲35.61
Total valid votes		136,283		
INC gain from JD		Swing	▲35.34	

=== Assembly Election 1994 ===
1994 Karnataka Legislative Assembly election : Yelahanka
Party	Candidate	Votes	%	±%
JD	M. H. Jayaprakashanarayan	63,776	32.99	▼16.80
INC	B. Prasanna Kumar	61,755	31.94	▼18.27
BJP	C. Muniyappa	56,666	29.31	New
JP	R. Saravanan	2,387	1.23	New
INC	T. Narayanaswamy	2,381	1.23	New
BSP	C. Muniyappa	1,865	0.96	New
Independent	Mallanna. M. Nayak Wadi	1,310	0.68	New
Margin of victory		2,021	1.05	▲0.63
Turnout		196,787	54.89	
Total valid votes		193,324		
Rejected ballots		3,463	1.76	
Registered electors		358,498		
JD gain from INC		Swing	▼17.22	

=== Assembly By-election 1993 ===
1993 Karnataka Legislative Assembly by-election : Yelahanka
Party	Candidate	Votes	%	±%
INC	B. Prasanna Kumar	61,357	50.21	▲0.27
JD	M. H. Jayaprakashanarayan	60,845	49.79	▲16.31
Margin of victory		512	0.42	▼16.04
Total valid votes		122,202		
INC hold		Swing	▲0.27	

=== Assembly Election 1989 ===
1989 Karnataka Legislative Assembly election : Yelahanka
Party	Candidate	Votes	%	±%
INC	B. Basavalingappa	70,882	49.94	▼2.00
JD	Shivaraj. V	47,520	33.48	New
JP	M. Thyagaraju	10,883	7.67	New
BJP	Muniswamy	4,978	3.51	▲2.91
Independent	C. Muniyappa	3,865	2.72	New
Independent	Vemala Roshaiah	1,025	0.72	New
Margin of victory		23,362	16.46	▲9.50
Turnout		150,416	52.60	▼3.06
Total valid votes		141,932		
Rejected ballots		8,484	5.64	▲4.06
Registered electors		285,968		▲72.01
INC hold		Swing	▼2.00	

=== Assembly Election 1985 ===
1985 Karnataka Legislative Assembly election : Yelahanka
Party	Candidate	Votes	%	±%
INC	B. Basavalingappa	47,302	51.94	▲11.36
JP	Shivaraj. V	40,960	44.98	▼11.00
Independent	S. M. Raju	1,072	1.18	New
BJP	M. Muddaiah	547	0.60	▼2.84
Margin of victory		6,342	6.96	▼8.45
Turnout		92,527	55.66	▼5.78
Total valid votes		91,066		
Rejected ballots		1,461	1.58	▼0.80
Registered electors		166,246		▲27.30
INC gain from JP		Swing	▼4.04	

=== Assembly Election 1983 ===
1983 Karnataka Legislative Assembly election : Yelahanka
Party	Candidate	Votes	%	±%
JP	V. Sreenivasan	43,851	55.98	▲10.49
INC	B. Basavalingappa	31,783	40.58	New
BJP	R. Shivachandra Naik	2,695	3.44	New
Margin of victory		12,068	15.41	▲7.33
Turnout		80,236	61.44	▼7.83
Total valid votes		78,329		
Rejected ballots		1,907	2.38	▲0.15
Registered electors		130,591		▲40.74
JP gain from INC(I)		Swing	▲2.41	

=== Assembly Election 1978 ===
1978 Karnataka Legislative Assembly election : Yelahanka
Party	Candidate	Votes	%	±%
INC(I)	B. Basavalingappa	33,662	53.57	New
JP	D. Munichinnappa	28,587	45.49	New
Independent	Chikkabaliappa	593	0.94	New
Margin of victory		5,075	8.08	▼22.78
Turnout		64,274	69.27	▲19.18
Total valid votes		62,842		
Rejected ballots		1,432	2.23	▲2.23
Registered electors		92,790		▲39.32
INC(I) gain from INC		Swing	▼4.55	

=== Assembly Election 1972 ===
1972 Mysore State Legislative Assembly election : Yelahanka
Party	Candidate	Votes	%	±%
INC	A. M. Suryanarayana Gowda	18,751	58.12	▲12.15
INC(O)	B. V. Ramachandra Reddy	8,793	27.25	New
Independent	C. Balasundaram	3,086	9.56	New
Independent	M. Jayadeva	983	3.05	New
ABJS	B. R. Rame Gowda	651	2.02	New
Margin of victory		9,958	30.86	▲27.01
Turnout		33,364	50.09	▼13.50
Total valid votes		32,264		
Registered electors		66,603		▲22.47
INC gain from Independent		Swing	▲8.30	

=== Assembly Election 1967 ===
1967 Mysore State Legislative Assembly election : Yelahanka
Party	Candidate	Votes	%	±%
Independent	B. Narayanaswamappa	16,307	49.82	New
INC	K. V. B. Gowda	15,046	45.97	▼16.82
Independent	B. Ramappa	864	2.64	New
Independent	G. M. Munivenatappa	515	1.57	New
Margin of victory		1,261	3.85	▼39.24
Turnout		34,583	63.59	▲2.85
Total valid votes		32,732		
Registered electors		54,384		▲13.17
Independent gain from INC		Swing	▼12.97	

=== Assembly Election 1962 ===
1962 Mysore State Legislative Assembly election : Yelahanka
Party	Candidate	Votes	%	±%
INC	Y. Ramakrishna	17,217	62.79	New
RPI	C. Balasundaram	5,403	19.71	New
Independent	T. Hanumaiah	2,661	9.70	New
Independent	Munishamappa	1,088	3.97	New
ABJS	Narayanamma	707	2.58	New
Independent	M. G. Chickkathimmaiah	220	0.80	New
Margin of victory		11,814	43.09	
Turnout		29,191	60.74	
Total valid votes		27,419		
Registered electors		48,057		
INC win (new seat)				

== See also ==
- Yelahanka
- Bangalore Urban district
- List of constituencies of Karnataka Legislative Assembly
