= Priya Krishna =

Priya Krishna may refer to:

- Priya Krishna (journalist)
- Priya Krishna (politician)
