= V. Somanna =

Indian politician

Veeranna Somanna
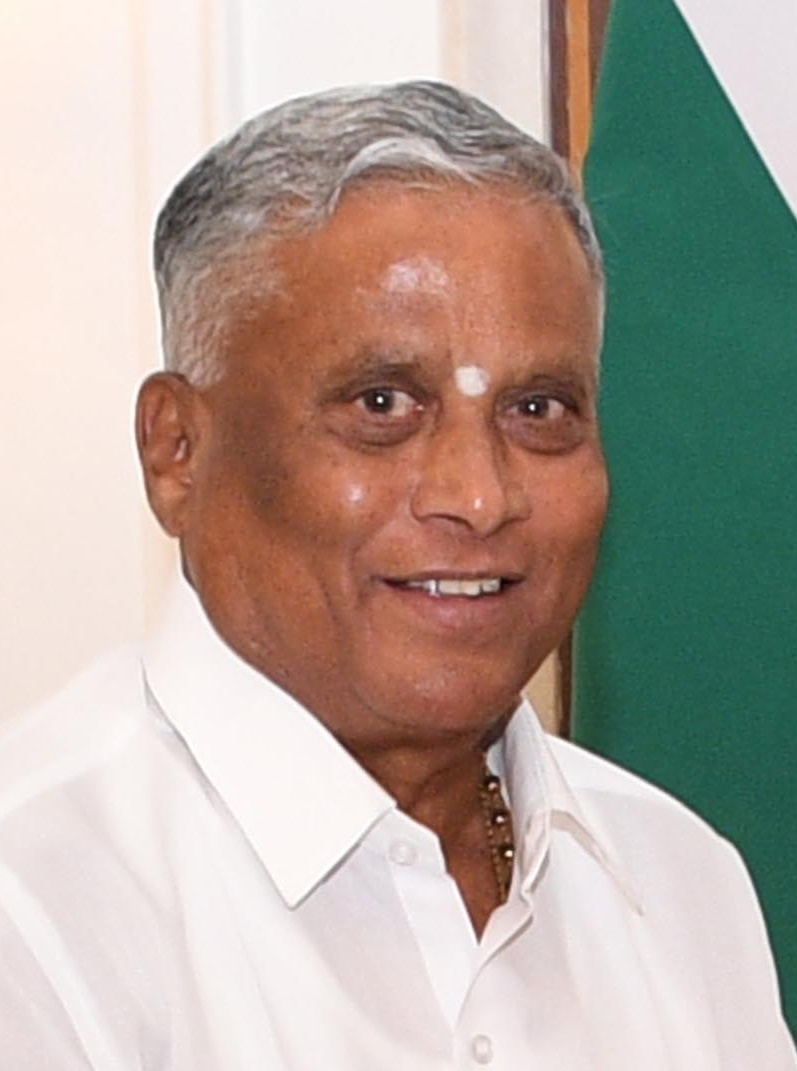

Union Minister of State for Jal Shakti
- Incumbent
- Assumed office 11 June 2024 Serving with Raj Bhushan Choudhary
- Prime Minister: Narendra Modi
- Minister: C. R. Patil
- Preceded by: Rajeev Chandrasekhar

Union Minister of State for Railways
- Incumbent
- Assumed office 11 June 2024 Serving with Ravneet Singh Bittu
- Prime Minister: Narendra Modi
- Minister: Ashwini Vaishnaw
- Preceded by: Raosaheb Danve, Darshana Jardosh

Member of Parliament, Lok Sabha
- Incumbent
- Assumed office 4 June 2024
- Preceded by: G. S. Basavaraj
- Constituency: Tumkur
Karnataka state offices
Minister of Infrastructure Development
In office 4 August 2021 – 13 May 2023
Chief Minister	Basavaraj Bommai
Preceded by	Anand Singh
Minister of Housing
In office 20 August 2019 – 13 May 2023
Chief Minister	B. S. Yediyurappa; Basavaraj Bommai
Preceded by	M. T. B. Nagaraj
In office 12 December 2010 – 28 May 2013
Chief Minister	B. S. Yediyurappa; Sadananda Gowda; Jagadish Shettar
Preceded by	Katta Subramanya Naidu
Succeeded by	Ambareesh
Minister of Sericulture
In office 27 September 2019 – 10 February 2020
Chief Minister	B. S. Yediyurappa
Preceded by	S. R. Mahesh
Succeeded by	Narayana Gowda
Minister of Horticulture
In office 27 September 2019 – 10 February 2020
Chief Minister	B. S. Yediyurappa
Preceded by	M. C. Managuli
Succeeded by	Narayana Gowda
Minister of Muzrai
In office 18 June 2009 – 31 August 2009
Chief Minister	B. S. Yediyurappa
Preceded by	S. N. Krishnaiah Shetty
Succeeded by	J. Krishna Palemar
Member of Karnataka Legislative Council
In office 22 September 2010 – 15 May 2018
Succeeded by	H. M. Ramesh Gowda
Constituency	elected by Legislative Assembly members
Member of the Karnataka Legislative Assembly
In office 2018–2023
Preceded by	Priya Krishna
Succeeded by	Priya Krishna
Constituency	Govindraj Nagar
In office 2008–2009
Preceded by	Seat established
Succeeded by	Priya Krishna
Constituency	Govindraj Nagar
In office 1994–2008
Preceded by	Naseer Ahmed
Succeeded by	Seat disestablished
Constituency	Binnypet

Personal details
- Born: 20 July 1950 (age 76) Doddamaralavadi, Bangalore District, Mysore State, India (Present Day Doddamaralavadi, Kanakapura Taluk, Bengaluru South District, Karnataka, India)
- Party: Bharatiya Janata party
- Other political affiliations: Indian National Congress

Veeranna Somanna is an Indian politician currently serving as Union Minister of State (MoS) in Ministry of Railways and Ministry of Jal Shakti, Government of India. He was the minister of housing and Infrastructure Development department of Karnataka from 4 August 2021 to 13 May 2023. He was Member of the Karnataka Legislative Assembly from Govindraj Nagara constituency from May 2018 to 13 May 2023.

On 10 June 2016, he was re-elected to the Karnataka Legislative Council. He secured 31 votes of BJP MLAs. In March 2024, he was announced as the BJP candidate for the Tumkur constituency in the 2024 General Elections. He went on to win the Lok Sabha election from Tumkur and was subsequently appointed the Minister of State of Ministry of Railways and Ministry of Jal Shakti.

== Personal life ==
Somanna was born on 20 July 1951 to Veeranna and Kempamma in Doddamaralavadi of Bangalore South district, Karnataka in a Veerashaiva family. He is married to Shailaja and has three children.

== Positions held ==
- 1983 - 1987: Elected to Bangalore Mahanagara Palike
- 1994 - MLA from Binnypet on Janata Dal ticket
- 1996 - 1999: Minister for Prisons, Minister for Bangalore Urban Development
- 1999 - Elected from Binnypet as an Independent
- 2004 - Elected for a third time on a Congress ticket
- 2008 - Elected from Govindarajan nagar on a Congress ticket
- 2010 - 2018: Member of Karnataka Legislative Council
- 2018– 2023: Elected for a second time on a BJP ticket
- 2019 - 2020: Minister of Horticulture and Sericulture
- 2021 -2023: Minister for Housing and Minister for Infrastructure and Development
- 2024 - present: Serves as the Union Minister of State for Railways in India.

== See also ==
- Third Modi ministry
