= A. C. Srinivasa =

Indian politician (born 1967)

A. C. Srinivasa (born 1967) is an Indian politician from Karnataka. He is a member of the Karnataka Legislative Assembly from Pulakeshinagar Assembly constituency which is reserved for SC community in Bangalore Urban district. He represents Indian National Congress Party and won the 2023 Karnataka Legislative Assembly election.

== Early life and education ==
Srinivasa is from Devanahalli. His father A. M. Chinnavenkataiah is a farmer. He completed his graduation on commerce in 1989 from V. V. Puram College which is affiliated with Bangalore University.

== Career ==
Srinivasa unsuccessfully contested 2018 Karnataka Legislative Assembly election from Mahadevapura Assembly constituency against Bharatiya Janata Party candidate Arvind Limbavali. But won the 2023 Karnataka Legislative Assembly election from Pulakeshinagar Assembly constituency representing Indian National Congress. He polled 87,316 votes and defeated his nearest rival, Akhanda Srinivas Murthy of Bahujan Samaj Party, by a margin of 62,210 votes.
