= Pulakeshinagar Assembly constituency =

Legislative Assembly constituency in Karnataka, India

Coordinates: 12.997°N 77.614°E

Pulakeshinagar
- Constituency No. 159 for the Karnataka Legislative Assembly

Constituency details
- Country: India
- Region: South India
- State: Karnataka
- District: Bangalore Urban
- Lok Sabha constituency: Bangalore North
- Established: 2008
- Total electors: 239,090 (2023)
- Reservation: SC

Member of Legislative Assembly
- 16th Karnataka Legislative Assembly
- Incumbent A. C. Srinivasa
- Party: Indian National Congress
- Elected year: 2023
- Preceded by: Akhanda Srinivas Murthy

Pulakeshinagar Assembly constituency is one of the 224 constituencies in the Karnataka Legislative Assembly of Karnataka, a southern state of India. It is also part of Bangalore North Lok Sabha constituency. Muslims are the majority community in the constituency, with 54% of the electorate, while Dalits are a significant minority.

A. C. Srinivasa is the current MLA from this constituency winning the 2023 Karnataka Legislative Assembly election.

== Members of the Legislative Assembly ==
Election	Member	Party
2008	B. Prasanna Kumar	Indian National Congress
2013	Akhanda Srinivas Murthy	Janata Dal
2018	Akhanda Srinivas Murthy	Indian National Congress
2023	A. C. Srinivasa	Indian National Congress

== Election results ==
=== Assembly Election 2023 ===
2023 Karnataka Legislative Assembly election : Pulakeshinagar
Party	Candidate	Votes	%	±%
INC	A. C. Srinivasa	87,316	66.72%	▼10.46
BSP	Akhanda Srinivas Murthy	25,106	19.18%	New
BJP	A. Murali	10,624	8.12%	▲0.62
SDPI	B. R. Bhaskar Prasad	4,102	3.13%	New
NOTA	None of the above	1,190	0.91%	▼0.20
JD(S)	Anuradha. V	844	0.64%	▼11.97
Margin of victory		62,210	47.54%	▼17.02
Turnout		130,901	54.75%	▲1.46
Total valid votes		130,869		
Registered electors		239,090		▲0.76
INC hold		Swing	▼10.46	

=== Assembly Election 2018 ===
2018 Karnataka Legislative Assembly election : Pulakeshinagar
Party	Candidate	Votes	%	±%
INC	Akhanda Srinivas Murthy	97,574	77.18%	▲49.60
JD(S)	B. Prasanna Kumar	15,948	12.61%	▼22.22
BJP	Susheela Devaraj	9,479	7.50%	▲4.24
NOTA	None of the above	1,402	1.11%	New
Margin of victory		81,626	64.56%	▲57.31
Turnout		126,452	53.29%	▼3.08
Total valid votes		126,432		
Registered electors		237,288		▲33.09
INC gain from JD(S)		Swing	▲42.35	

=== Assembly Election 2013 ===
2013 Karnataka Legislative Assembly election : Pulakeshinagar
Party	Candidate	Votes	%	±%
JD(S)	Akhanda Srinivas Murthy	48,995	34.83%	▲6.93
INC	B. Prasanna Kumar	38,796	27.58%	▼22.83
SDPI	A. Hemalatha	5,431	3.86%	New
BJP	Palani Velu. K	4,589	3.26%	▼10.92
Margin of victory		10,199	7.25%	▼15.25
Turnout		100,505	56.37%	▲14.07
Total valid votes		140,672		
Registered electors		178,292		▼3.95
JD(S) gain from INC		Swing	▼15.58	

=== Assembly Election 2008 ===
2008 Karnataka Legislative Assembly election : Pulakeshinagar
Party	Candidate	Votes	%	±%
INC	B. Prasanna Kumar	39,577	50.41%	New
JD(S)	R. Srinivasa Murthy	21,908	27.90%	New
BJP	Dr. Chikka Melurappa Alias Prof. Mylarappa	11,131	14.18%	New
BSP	V. Sreenivasan	2,408	3.07%	New
AIADMK	D. Anbarasan	1,537	1.96%	New
Independent	R. Saravanan	888	1.13%	New
Margin of victory		17,669	22.50%	
Turnout		78,515	42.30%	
Total valid votes		78,514		
Registered electors		185,617		
INC win (new seat)				

== See also ==
- Bangalore Urban district
- List of constituencies of Karnataka Legislative Assembly
