= B. Prasanna Kumar =

Indian politician

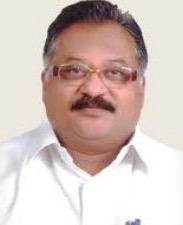

Member of Karnataka Legislative Assembly
- In office 2008–2013
- Preceded by: Constituency established
- Succeeded by: Akhanda Srinivas Murthy
- Constituency: Pulakeshinagar
- In office 1999–2008
- Preceded by: M. H. Jayaprakashanarayan
- Succeeded by: S. R. Vishwanath
- Constituency: Yelahanka
- In office 1993-1994
- Preceded by: B. Basavalingappa
- Succeeded by: M. H. Jayaprakashanarayan
- Constituency: Yelahanka

Personal details
- Born: Prasanna Kumar Basavalingappa; 1953 (age 72–73) Bangalore, Mysore State, India
- Party: Indian National Congress
- Parent: B. Basavalingappa
- Education: Mysore University, Maharaja's College
- Profession: Politician

Prasanna Kumar Basavalingappa better known as B. Prasanna Kumar is an Indian politician. He was a Member of Legislative Assembly for Yelahanka constituency from 1999 to 2008 and Pulakeshinagar constituency from 2008 to 2013.

== Political career ==
B. Prasanna Kumar entered political life after his father B. Basavalingappa's death and contested in his father's constituency in Yelahanka in 1993.

== Personal life ==
Prasanna Kumar was born on 7 January 1953, and is the son of former cabinet minister of Karnataka, B. Basavalingappa (1924–1992). He has two children, Lavanya and Varun.
