= Greater Bangalore =

Administrative area

Greater Bangalore Beṅgaḷūru Mahānagara Kṣētra Bengaluru Urban Agglomeration (BUA)
- Metropolitan Area
- Country: India
- State: Karnataka
- Established: 1976
- Largest City: Bengaluru
- Districts: Bengaluru Urban district; Bengaluru North district; Bengaluru South district

Government
  - Type: Principal Area Planning Authority
  - Body: Greater Bengaluru Development Authority

Area
  - Metro: 1,294 km^{2} (500 sq mi)

Population (2011)
  - Metro: 9,044,664
  - Metro density: 6,990/km^{2} (18,100/sq mi)
- Time zone: UTC+5.30 (IST)
- Nominal GDP (2022-23): $118.19 billion

Greater Bengaluru Development Authority (GBDA) : (IAST: Beṅgaḷūru Mahānagara Kṣētra) also known as the Bengaluru Urban Agglomeration (BUA) is a metropolitan area in the state of Karnataka, with an area of 1,294 km^{2} (500 sq mi), which includes the 712 km^{2} (275 sq mi) area of five cities of Greater Bengaluru presided over by the 5 City Corporations of Greater Bengaluru (Bengaluru City) under the apex body the Greater Bengaluru Authority (GBA) and its neighbouring 582 km^{2} (225 sq mi) urbanised areas consisting of 251 City Municipal Councils (CMCs), Town Municipal Councils (TMCs) and Grama Panchayats. Bengaluru Metropolitan Area (BMA) as it is abbreviated is presided over by the Bengaluru Development Authority (BDA), and should not be confused with the Bengaluru Metropolitan Region (BMR), which comprises a much larger area of 8,005 km^{2} (3,091 sq mi) made up by the entirety of three districts of Bengaluru Urban, Bengaluru North, Bengaluru South, and is presided over by the Bengaluru Metropolitan Region Development Authority (BMRDA).

== History ==
BMA was created on 6 January 1976 under the Bangalore Development Authority Act 1976 superseding the earlier civic planning authority known as the City Improvement Trust Board (CITB), but remaining nearly identical in function. The First erstwhile Chairman of BDA was Shri B.T.Somanna. The BDA is a largely unelected local authority with most of its members accountable to, and directly appointed by the state government. This creates issues with local representation, particularly since the passage of the Constitution (74th) Amendment Act, 1992 mandating the devolution of planning powers to local, elected authorities.

== Geography ==
The following are the Corporations, Municipal councils and Village areas in Bengaluru Metropolitan Area.

- Greater Bengaluru Authority
  - Bengaluru Central City Corporation
  - Bengaluru North City Corporation
  - Bengaluru South City Corporation
  - Bengaluru East City Corporation
  - Bengaluru West City Corporation
- 251 City Municipal Councils, Town Municipal Councils and Grama Panchayats.

== See also ==
- Greater Bengaluru Authority
- Bengaluru Development Authority
- Bengaluru Metropolitan Region Development Authority
- Bengaluru Metropolitan Region
