= S. R. Vishwanath =

Indian politician

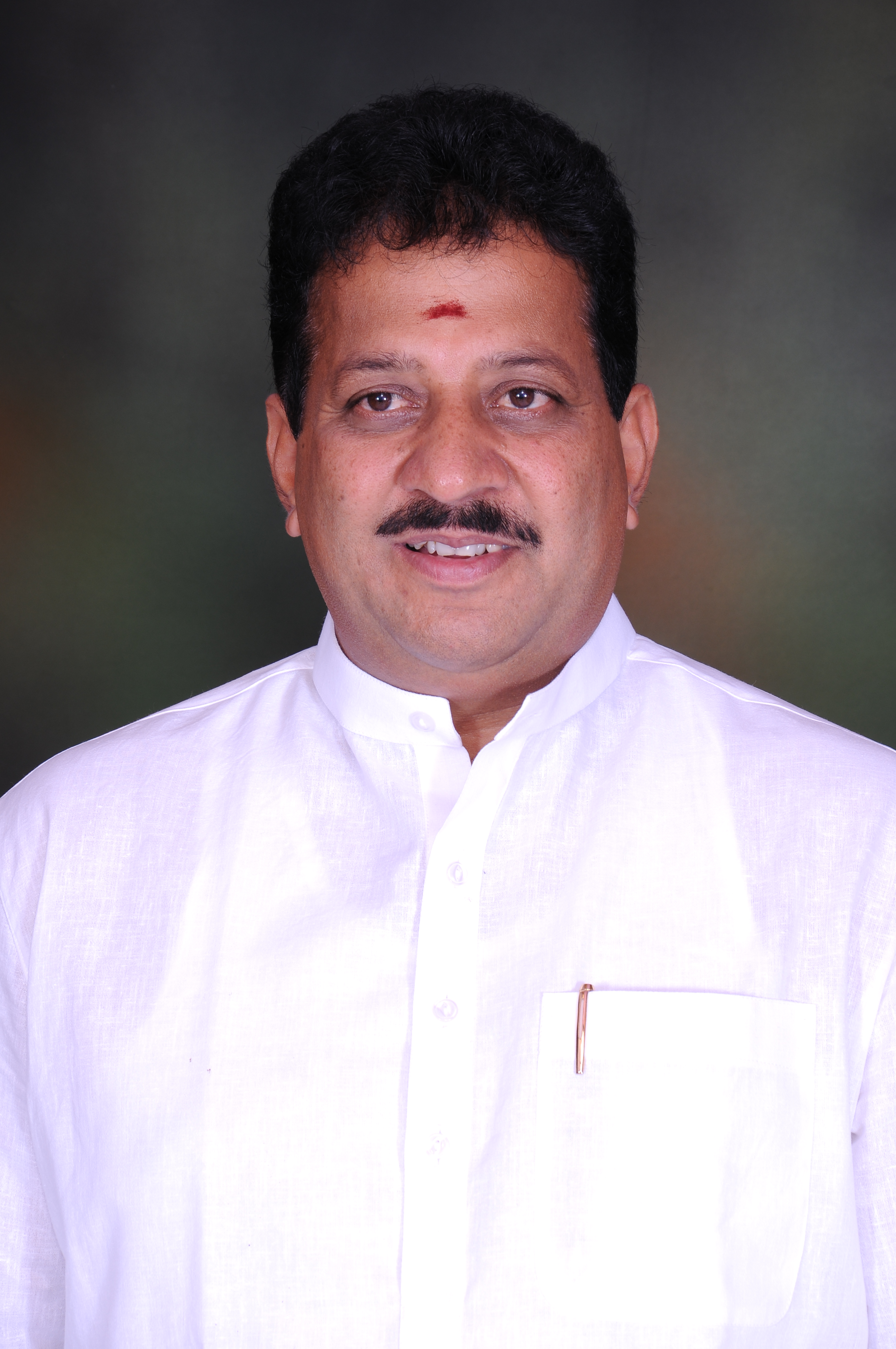

Member of the Karnataka Legislative Assembly
- Incumbent
- Assumed office 25 May 2008
- Preceded by: B. Prasanna Kumar
- Constituency: congress (Vidhan Sabha constituency)|Yelahanka]]

Personal details
- Born: 24 July 1962 (age 64) Singanayakanahalli
- Party: Bharatiya Janata Party
- Spouse: Vanishree
- Children: Alok and Apoorva
- Occupation: Politician

Singanayakanahalli Ramaiah Vishwanath is an Indian politician who is currently serving as a member of the Karnataka Legislative Assembly from Yelahanka since 25 May 2008. He is a former chairman of the Bangalore Development Authority (BDA) and is presently a member of Tirumala Tirupati Devasthanams (TTD) Board.

== Family and Education ==
Vishwanath was born to K. V. Ramaiah and Smt. Mallamma and is the youngest child. He is married to Vanishree who is a native of Bidadi, Ramanagara and also hails from a farmer's family. Vanishree was elected twice as the Zilla Panchayat member and later as the Zilla Panchayat President, Bangalore Urban. She is an integral part of the VishwaVani Foundation.

Vishwanath did his schooling from Government school, Singanayakanahalli. He completed his diploma in ITI from MRJTTI institute, Bangalore. He did his apprenticeship at Bharat Earthmovers Limited (BML). He did his Bachelor of Arts from Bangalore Arts College. He has a son Alok who completed his master's degree from Columbia University in the State of New York and a daughter Apoorva who studied at BMSIT, Yelahanka.

== Early life and Political career ==
Vishwanath credits his father, K V Ramaiah, an agriculturist, as his motivation to enter politics. His father was a Congress loyalist and a close aide of Basavalingappa, the then Congress minister. However, he got disillusioned during the Emergency time and hence supported his son's decision to join RSS.

Vishwanath joined the Rashtriya Swayamsevak Sangh (RSS) in 1979 as a Mukhya Shikshak and in 1980 as a RSS taluk karyavahak. In 1985, Vishwanath worked as a flight control technician in Hindustan Aeronautics Limited (HAL).

In 1988 he was named as the Zilla Sharirik Pramukh of RSS. Vishwanath participated in the Ram Rath Yatra to Ayodhya in 1990, Rama Jyothi and Rama Padhuke processions.

From 1989 to 1991 he became the Bengaluru Zilla Hindu Jagarana Vedike Sanchalak.

He joined the BJP in 1991. From 1992 to 1994 he was the Bangalore BJP Zilla Yuva Morcha general secretary.

In 1994, he participated in the national flag hoisting during Independence Day at Hubli Idgah Maidan, a disputed land along with Uma Bharati and B.S Yedyurappa, where curfew was imposed and police were ordered to open fire on the BJP supporters and Sangh Parivar members by the then Chief minister Veerappa Moily. This led to several of them being killed and many others injured.

From 1995 to 1997 he became the BJP State Yuva morcha secretary. He unsuccessfully contested Zilla panchayat in 1995 from Hesarghatta getting defeated by a mere 18 votes.

In 2000, he won the Zilla Panchayat elections from Hesaraghatta becoming the only BJP Zilla Panchayat member in the entire Bengaluru district.

Vishwanath was elected as the Hindustan Aeronautics Limited (HAL) Union President in 2007 and All India Chief Convener and (JAF) Joint Action Front for public sector factories in Bangalore. He nostalgically says, “Jaguars was introduced in our times” as he glances through ‘History of Aviation’ article published in Citizen Matters.

The 2008 elections saw him rise as the MLA of Yelahanka constituency after the constituency became a general constituency, which was predominantly a Congress stronghold. He also served as the KSSIDC (Karnataka State Small Industries Development Corporation Ltd.) Chairman in the 2008 BJP Government.

In 2009, Vishwanath led the Save Arkavathy Padayathra from Nandi hills to Thippagondanahalli raising awareness among villagers and fostering support for the rejuvenation of lakes and water bodies. This gained the attention of the state government and Rs.25 crore was sanctioned for the purpose of rejuvenation of water bodies. As a result, majority of the water bodies was rejuvenated.

S R Vishwanath is a 3 time MLA from Yelahanka constituency. He won by a huge margin of 44503 votes during the 2018 assembly elections.

His day starts at 6 with an hour of exercise and thotada kelasa (farming) followed by meeting the public till 10 AM at his home-cum-office at Singanayakanahalli, few kilometres from Yelahanka on the Doddaballapur road. Later in the day, he goes to the city or his constituency to follow up and inspect projects and attend functions. He has a Black belt in Karate. He was endorsed by Bangalore Political Action Committee (B.PAC) for the 2018 assembly elections.

He is the BJP district incharge of Chikkaballapura, Bangalore rural and Ramanagara. He was the Sanchalak of the Chikballapura Lok Sabha constituency for 2019. In spite of Yelahanka being the only constituency with a BJP legislator out of the 8 constituencies in the Chikballapura Lok Sabha constituency, he ensured the victory of BJP candidate against the former Chief Minister and union minister Veerappa Moily. His constituency alone gave a lead of more than 75000 votes.
