= Bangalore Development Authority =

Principal area planning authority for Bengaluru's peripheral metropolitan area

- Beṅgaḷūru Abhivr̥d'dhi Prādhikāra
- Logo of the BDA

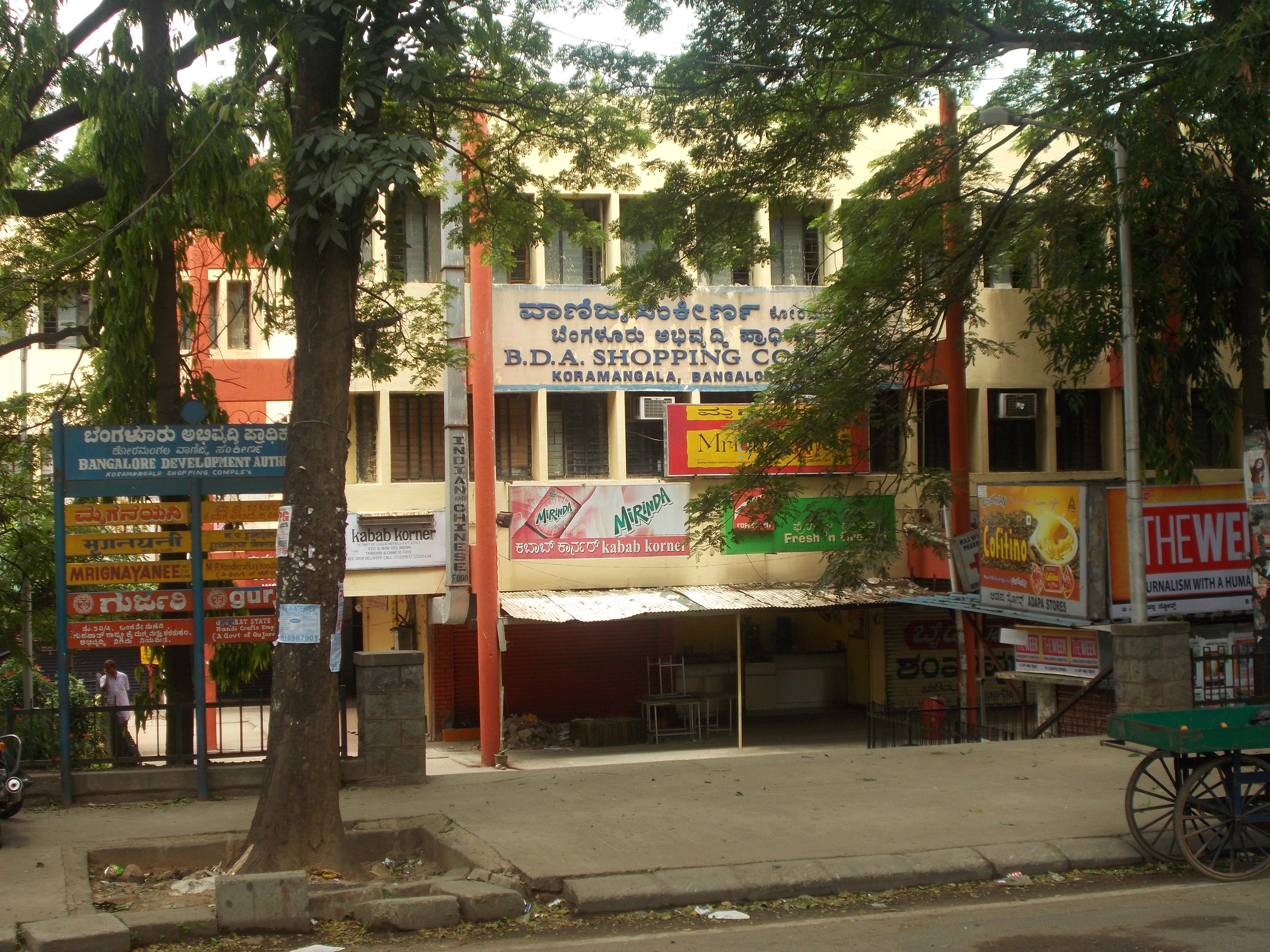
- This shopping complex on the Inner Ring Road in Koramangala was built by the BDA. It was once called the BDA Complex - Koramangala, but it is now the GBA Complex - Koramangala under the Greater Bengaluru Authority.

Principal Area Planning Authority overview
- Formed: 6 January 1976
- Preceding Principal Area Planning Authority: City Improvement Trust Board (1945–1976)
- Superseding Principal Area Planning Authority: Greater Bengaluru Authority (since September 2025) (Only for Areas within Bengaluru City)
- Jurisdiction: Government of Karnataka
- Headquarters: Bengaluru
- Employees: 486
- Minister responsible: D. K. Shivakumar, Minister responsible for Bengaluru Development Authority and Bengaluru Metropolitan Region Development Authority, Government of Karnataka
- Principal Area Planning Authority executives: Major Manivannan. P, Commissioner, BDA; N. A. Haris, Chairman, BDA; L K Atheeq, Chairman, Bengaluru Business Corridor
- Parent department: Urban Development Department, Government of Karnataka
- Website: bdakarnataka.in

The Bangalore Development Authority (BDA) is a governmental organisation (referred to within India as a parastatal entity) and the principal area planning authority for the peripheral zones of the Bengaluru Metropolitan Area (BMA) — those lying outside the jurisdiction of Greater Bengaluru (Bengaluru City) — covering 582 km^{2} (225 sq mi) in accordance with the Karnataka Municipal Corporations Act. Its mandate flows from the Karnataka Town and Country Planning Act, 1961 (KTCPA), under which it is required to prepare a Comprehensive Development Plan (CDP) for the peripheral BMA, govern land use, develop residential and civic infrastructure, and provide housing for economically weaker sections. Since its inception, the BDA has allotted over 76,000 residential sites and provided more than 800 civic amenity plots to public utilities and neighbourhood organisations.

Since September 2025, the Greater Bengaluru Authority (GBA) — established under the Greater Bengaluru Governance Act, 2024 (notified 15 May 2025) — has assumed planning responsibilities for the 712 km^{2} (275 sq mi) of Bengaluru City, reducing the BDA's effective jurisdiction to the outer peripheral areas of the metropolitan region.

The BDA has prepared four Comprehensive Development Plans for Bengaluru since 1976, most recently a draft Revised Master Plan 2031 that was withdrawn in 2020 and is being restarted. Its major infrastructure achievements include the Outer Ring Road and multiple flyovers; it has also been criticised for corruption, persistent failure to deliver basic services in its residential layouts, and inadequate accountability to elected representatives.

== Background ==
=== Pre-BDA planning: the City Improvement Trust Board ===
Urban planning in Bangalore before 1976 was administered primarily through the City Improvement Trust Board (CITB), established in 1945 under The City of Bangalore Improvement Act, 1945 enacted by the then Government of Mysore. The CITB was an unelected body comprising experts and technocrats, constituted under Section 3 of the Act to draw improvement schemes and undertake works for the improvement of the city. Its mandate was to reduce overcrowding in areas identified for improvement and to build residential extensions with modern infrastructure including roads, water supply, and drainage.

Between 1945 and 1973, the CITB developed over 65 residential extensions distributed across more than 60,000 sites and undertook 160 improvement schemes. Among the significant layouts it developed were Sadashivanagar, Jayamahal, and the Palace Upper and Lower Orchards (Vyalikaval), which were laid out on land procured from the Mysore royal family's palace estates. The legacy of the CITB's top-down urban planning approach — vesting authority in appointed technocrats rather than elected representatives — directly shaped the governance structure of the BDA, which succeeded it.

=== Establishment ===
The BDA was established on 6 January 1976 under the Bangalore Development Authority Act, 1976, superseding the CITB. The BDA Act, 1976 was enacted in pursuance of a resolution passed at a 1971 conference of Ministers for Housing and Urban Development held at Delhi, which agreed that a single, unified authority should be set up for the development of metropolitan cities. The new Authority combined in itself the planning functions of the City Planning Authority and the developmental functions of the erstwhile CITB. The first Chairman of the BDA was Shri B.T. Somanna.

The BDA Act vests the Authority with powers to prepare and implement development schemes including site-and-services projects, road networks, and civic amenities, while imposing obligations on landowners for contributions toward such developments through the levy of betterment tax. Under Section 21 of the Act, the BDA is entitled to levy betterment tax on the owners of land within a development scheme area where the market value of that land has increased, or will increase, as a consequence of the execution of the scheme.

=== Governance structure ===
Of the BDA's 23 members, only 2 are elected corporators; the remainder are directly appointed by the state government. This has long created accountability tensions, particularly after the Constitution (74th Amendment) Act, 1992 mandated the devolution of planning powers to elected local bodies. Despite being the principal planning authority for its jurisdiction, it has been estimated that up to 90 percent of new residential layouts on the Bengaluru periphery lack formal BDA approval, and over time these tend to be regularised by successive state governments — exhibiting all of the problems of ad hoc development, including irregular road layouts, boundary encroachments, and absent essential services.

The BDA operates under the oversight of the Government of Karnataka through the Department of Urban Development, which holds authority over key appointments, policy directives, and operational approvals. Since the 1981 amendment to the BDA Act, a Commissioner of the Authority — a senior officer of the rank of Secretary to Government — has been appointed to ensure more effective day-to-day administration, leaving the Chairman to guide policy proceedings of the Authority.

=== Accountability concerns and reforms ===
In 1995, a prominent scandal involved the illegal sale of around 200 BDA sites by corrupt officials. A 1993 Public Affairs Center report card on BDA performance documented widespread citizen dissatisfaction, and a 1997 report by the Committee on Urban Management in Bangalore (CUMB) concluded the organisation had outlived its mandate and should be disbanded.

A 1999 World Bank policy paper labelled the BDA one of the most corrupt and inefficient civic institutions in the city, reporting that 65 percent of Bengalureans were dissatisfied with it and just 1 percent satisfied — the worst score for any civic agency in Bengaluru — with the BDA also receiving the highest share of bribes (33 percent) exchanged for expediting service outcomes. Following these findings, the BDA undertook operational and asset management reforms that increased residential layout development in subsequent years.

=== The Kasturirangan Report, 2008 ===
The 2008 Expert Committee Report on Governance in the Bangalore Metropolitan Region reaffirmed that the BDA had, as both developer and regulator, neglected its regulatory role, but acknowledged its credibility in delivering major infrastructure projects, including the Outer Ring Road. The report recommended that land regulation responsibilities be transferred to the BBMP, with the BDA focusing on infrastructure development.

== 2025 Governance Restructuring ==
The Greater Bengaluru Governance Act, 2024, notified on 15 May 2025, established the Greater Bengaluru Authority (GBA) as the apex metropolitan governance body. The BBMP continued to function in a transitional capacity until it was formally dissolved on 2 September 2025, when the five new city corporations and the GBA became fully operational.

Under the restructuring, planning powers for the 712 km^{2} (275 sq mi) of Bengaluru City transferred to the GBA, now coordinating five new municipal corporations (North, South, East, West and Central Bengaluru) and responsible for the city's Comprehensive Development Plan and major infrastructure agencies including BWSSB, BMTC and Namma Metro. The BDA's jurisdiction was reduced from 1,294 km^{2} (500 sq mi) to the peripheral 582 km^{2} (225 sq mi), with its revised mandate focused on large-scale infrastructure execution — arterial and sub-arterial roads and stormwater drainage — rather than city-wide master planning.

Tushar Girinath, Additional Chief Secretary of the Urban Development Department (UDD), confirmed a pending amendment to the KTCP Act to formally vest the GBA with master plan powers. The Observer Research Foundation, in a May 2025 analysis, observed that the Act risks centralising power and weakening elected local bodies, raising questions about its alignment with the 74th Constitutional Amendment's decentralisation mandate.

Jurisdictions of the Bangalore Development Authority and Greater Bengaluru Authority

BDA jurisdiction (peripheral planning area, ~499 km²)
Greater Bengaluru Authority — GBA (5 corporations, ~712 km²)

== Metropolitan Context ==
The BDA operates within the broader Bengaluru Metropolitan Region (BMR), which is overseen at the regional level by the Bengaluru Metropolitan Region Development Authority (BMRDA), an autonomous body created under the BMRDA Act, 1985. The BMRDA's jurisdiction covers the BMR — comprising Bengaluru Urban, Bengaluru North and Bengaluru South districts — and it is empowered under Section 9 of the BMRDA Act to co-ordinate the activities of the BDA, the BBMP (dissolved September 2025 and succeeded by the Greater Bengaluru Authority), the BWSSB, the Karnataka Slum Clearance Board, and other agencies connected with development within the region.

Unlike the BDA, the BMRDA does not have the power to directly acquire land; its role is one of structure planning, coordination, and oversight rather than direct development. The BDA's Bengaluru Metropolitan Area (BMA), covering the local planning area for Bengaluru and its immediate periphery, is nested within the larger BMR framework and is expected to align its Comprehensive Development Plans with the BMRDA's structure plans for the region. The following planning and development authorities operate within the BMR alongside the BDA:

- Bangalore Metropolitan Region Development Authority (BMRDA) – Regional structure planning, coordination, and oversight of the following Area Planning Authorities (APAs) in the Bengaluru Metropolitan Region comprising the three districts of Bengaluru Urban, Bengaluru North and Bengaluru South.
  - Greater Bengaluru Authority (GBA) – 712 km^{2} (275 sq mi) city of Bengaluru. (from September 2025)
  - Bangalore Development Authority (BDA) – 582 km^{2} (225 sq mi) peripheral area of Bengaluru Metropolitan Area around the city of Bengaluru. (from September 2025)
  - Bengaluru International Airport Area Planning Authority (BIAAPA) – area around Bengaluru' s Kempegowda International Airport situated in Bengaluru North district.
  - Bangalore-Mysore Infrastructure Corridor Area Planning Authority (BMICAPA) – Area around NICE Road in the Southern and Western periphery of the city.
  - Greater Bengaluru Development Authority (GBDA) – Greater Bengaluru Integrated Township Project (GBITP) in Bidadi taluk. (Previously referred to as Bidadi Planning Authority (BPA))
  - Satellite Town Ring Road Planning Authority (STRRPA) – Bengaluru Satellite Town Ring Road Project (BSTRRP), area around Bengaluru's Satellite Town Ring Road.
  - Ramanagara Urban Development Authority (RUDA) – Areas in Ramanagara taluk.
  - Anekal Planning Authority (APA) – Areas in Anekal taluk.
  - Kanakapura Planning Authority (KPA) – Areas in Kanakapura taluk.
  - Magadi Planning Authority (MPA) – Areas in Magadi taluk.
  - Nelamangala Planning Authority – Areas in Nelamangala taluk.
  - Channapatna Planning Authority (CPA) – Areas in Channapatna taluk.
  - Doddaballapura Planning Authority (DPA) – Areas in Doddaballapura taluk.

== Departments ==
The BDA's operational activities are divided across several functional departments, as established under the Bangalore Development Authority Act, 1976 and detailed in the Authority's official functioning structure:

Town Planning Department
Prepares and revises the Comprehensive Development Plans and Master Plans for the Bengaluru Metropolitan Area. Engaged in the periodic preparation of layouts for housing schemes.

Engineering Department
Executes all developmental schemes undertaken by the Authority with respect to layouts and infrastructural works. Also responsible for roads, drainage, water supply, and sewerage infrastructure within BDA layouts.

Land Acquisition Department
Acquires land required for the execution of developmental schemes, working in close liaison with the Engineering Department. Operates under Sections 35 and 36 of the BDA Act, 1976, which enable acquisition either by voluntary agreement with landowners or compulsorily through procedures modelled on the Land Acquisition Act, 1894.

Allotment and Administration Department
Handles all matters relating to allotment of residential and commercial sites and flats, post-allotment work, assessment and collection of property tax on BDA sites and buildings, and collection of lease amounts from commercial shops owned by the Authority.

Finance Department
Advises the Authority on financial matters, maintains the Authority's accounts, and oversees the demand, collection, and balance of dues payable to the Authority.

Law Department
Advises the Authority on legal issues and handles all litigations filed by and against the BDA in various courts.

Special Task Force (Vigilance) Department
Protects the properties of the BDA and the green belt area from encroachment and unauthorised construction.

Estate Section
Monitors and manages the BDA's property records, identifies encroachments on BDA lands, and recovers encroached lands by demolishing unauthorised structures.

Public Relations Department
Handles media-related functions including press releases, advertisement publications, and public queries, transferring them to the respective departments.

== Functions ==
=== Planning functions ===
The BDA performs the following planning functions under the authority of the Karnataka Town and Country Planning Act, 1961 and the Bangalore Development Authority Act, 1976:

- Preparing scheme plans and approving Development Plans for layouts and group housing.
- Preparing and revising the Comprehensive Development Plan for the peripheral Bengaluru Metropolitan Area.
- Governing land use through zoning regulations within the local planning area.
- Approving or refusing planning applications for new layouts, extensions, and private streets within its jurisdiction.
- Reserving not less than 15 percent of the total area of any layout for public parks and playgrounds, and an additional 10 percent for civic amenity sites, under Section 17 of the BDA Act.

=== Development functions ===
- Providing sites for commercial, residential, and industrial purposes.
- Constructing and maintaining roads, stormwater drainage, and sewerage infrastructure in BDA layouts.
- Constructing civic amenity buildings including hospitals, community halls, and educational institutions within layouts.
- Executing major road infrastructure projects (flyovers, underpasses, ring roads) across the metropolitan area.
- Providing housing for economically weaker sections of the population through dedicated housing schemes.
- Levying and recovering betterment tax on landowners whose properties have appreciated in value as a result of BDA development schemes.

== Housing Schemes ==
In addition to the allotment of residential sites, the BDA has periodically constructed and allotted flatted housing for various income groups. Under the BDA Housing Scheme, 2016, the Authority announced the allotment of 3,512 flats located at Alur (Phase 1 and 2), Kommaghatta (Phase 1 and 2), Doddabanahalli (Phase 1 and 2), Kaniminike (Phase 2, 3 and 4), Malagala (Phase 2), and Valagerahalli (Phase 5), covering the Economically Weaker Section (EWS), Low Income Group (LIG), and general categories, with units ranging from 1 BHK to 3 BHK configurations. Allotments under the scheme were governed by the BDA (Allotment of Sites) Rules, 1984.

Eligibility for EWS flats requires the applicant's annual family income to be below ₹1 lakh (for 1 BHK EWS units), while no income ceiling applies for other categories. Applicants must be residents of Karnataka. Those who have already been allotted a site or house at a subsidised rate in any part of Karnataka are not eligible to apply. The scheme also offered units in the High Income Group (HIG) and Middle Income Group (MIG) categories without income ceilings, making BDA's flatted housing portfolio accessible to a broad cross-section of the population.

== Comprehensive Development Plans ==
Under Section 13D of the Karnataka Town and Country Planning Act, 1961, the Master Plan for the Bengaluru Metropolitan Area is required to be revised once every ten years. The BDA has prepared four Master Plans for Bengaluru since 1976.

Year approved	Plan	Key features
1984	1st Comprehensive Development Plan (CDP '84)	Approved on 12 October 1984. Aimed at decongesting the central city and encouraging peripheral development. Demarcated land use zones for residential, industrial, and commercial purposes and incorporated provisions for green belts and transport corridors.
1995	2nd Comprehensive Development Plan (CDP '95)	Approved on 5 January 1995. Second revision of the metropolitan plan; addressed the city's growth following economic liberalisation.
2005	Revised Master Plan 2015 (RMP 2015)	Approved by the state government in 2005. Formed the basis for the NPKL and Karanth Layout programmes. Introduced Transfer of Development Rights (TDR) and premium Floor Area Ratio (FAR) provisions, and created a two-fold structure plan: strengthening existing urban areas and extending development to already-developed areas across five concentric belts. An interim revision was approved in 2007.
Ongoing (Draft)	Revised Master Plan 2031 (RMP 2031)	See § Revised Master Plan 2031 below.

=== Revised Master Plan 2031 ===
A draft Revised Master Plan 2031 was prepared with technical support from Haskoning DHV in association with Adapt Technologies. The plan covers a Local Planning Area of 1,206.97 sq km with a projected population of 18–20 million. Its four stated pillars are ecological sustainability, mobility, inclusive growth, and streamlined governance.

For the first time, the plan classifies streams into primary, secondary, and tertiary categories based on flood modelling carried out in association with the Karnataka State Natural Disaster Monitoring Centre, and demarcates buffer zones for lakes and streams per National Green Tribunal orders.

The draft met with significant public opposition at hearings conducted in 2017, with citizen groups including Whitefield Rising boycotting the plan on the grounds that it bypassed the constitutionally created Bangalore Metropolitan Planning Committee and projected a population figure in excess of two crore that they considered illogical. In November 2020, the BDA formally scrapped the draft and decided to begin the process afresh. The BDA's reduced jurisdiction under the GBA framework further narrows the geographic scope for which any successor plan would apply.

== Residential Layouts ==
=== Completed layouts (CITB era, pre-1976) ===
These layouts were developed by the City Improvement Trust Board (CITB), the BDA's predecessor, whose functions and assets the BDA inherited on 6 January 1976:

- Jayanagar
- Rajajinagar
- Indiranagar
- Palace Upper Orchard and Palace Lower Orchard (Vyalikaval)
- Vasanta Nagar
- Pillanna Garden (various stages)
- Jayamahal
- Sadashivanagar (initial development; further extended by the BDA post-1976)

=== Completed layouts (BDA era) ===
Layout	Approx. period	Location / Notes
Koramangala	1970s–80s	South-east Bengaluru; one of the city's earliest IT and residential hubs
JP Nagar	1980s–90s	South Bengaluru, multiple phases
HSR Layout	1980s–90s	Developed across villages of Agara, Yelikunte, Haralakunte and others
BTM Layout	1980s	South Bengaluru
HAL 2nd and 3rd Stages	1970s–80s	Near HAL Airport, Kodihalli / Thippasandra
Domlur (I, II stages, and Domlur Housing Scheme)	1970s–80s	Domlur village; multiple phases including EWS
Kasturi Nagar	1980s	North-east Bengaluru
Sadashivanagar (BDA extension)	1980s	North Bengaluru; initial layout by CITB, extended by BDA
RMV Extension (RMV 2nd Stage)	1980s–90s	Multiple blocks across Geddalahalli, Lottegollahalli, Bhoopasandra, Gangenahalli and Nagashettihalli
HBR Layout	1990s	Between Hennur Road and Nagavara
HRBR Layout (I, II, III stages)	1990s	Banaswadi / Lingarajapura / Challakere
RT Nagar	1980s	North Bengaluru
Banashankari (1st–6th stages)	1980s–2000s	South-west Bengaluru; 5th and 6th stages among the most recent phases
Kumaraswamy Layout	1980s–90s	South Bengaluru
Anjanapura (12 blocks) and Anjanapura Township	2000s	South Bengaluru; sites allotted through computerised lottery in 2002–03
Nagarabhavi (I and II stages)	1990s–2000s	West Bengaluru; across villages of Malagala, Nagarabhavi, Gangondanahalli
Avalahalli (Girinagar)	1990s	South-west Bengaluru
West of Chord Road (WCR) Layout (Basaveshwaranagar)	1980s–90s	Various stages (I–IV); across Kethamaranahalli, Shivanahalli
Sir M. Visvesvaraya Layout	2000s	South Bengaluru
Kengeri Satellite Town	1980s–90s	West Bengaluru
Nandhini Layout	1990s	West Bengaluru; across J.B. Kawal and Laggere
Chandra Layout (I–II phases)	1990s	West Bengaluru; Kempapura Agrahara and Divatige Ramanahalli
Gnana Bharathi Layout	1990s	West Bengaluru; Valagerehalli / Nagadevanahalli
AECS Layout (A, B, C blocks), Kundanahalli Gate	1990s	East Bengaluru
O.M.B.R. Layout	1990s	Banaswadi
East of NGEF	1990s–2000s	Banaswadi / Benniganahalli
Arkavathy Layout	2000s	North-west Bengaluru; subject to major denotification controversy (see §Criticism)

=== Layouts under Master Plan 2015 ===
Under the Revised Master Plan 2015, the BDA announced five major new layouts to deliver at least 90,000 sites across the metropolitan region:

==== Nadaprabhu Kempegowda Layout (NPKL) — ongoing ====
NPKL is BDA's largest active residential layout, located near Kengeri in south-west Bengaluru. Phase 3 is ongoing as of 2025, with BDA in January 2025 issuing fresh tenders for asphalting inner roads across outstanding blocks, citing an 80 percent completion claim — disputed by residents of Blocks 5A–I. BDA used NPKL to pilot a hybrid land-acquisition compensation model, offering landowners 40 percent of compensation in the form of developed plots and 60 percent in cash — a model it has since adopted for the PRR-2 layouts.

==== Dr K. Shivaram Karanth Layout — ongoing ====
Located in North Bengaluru across 17 villages between Doddaballapur and Hesaraghatta Road, the layout covers 3,546 acres and is planned to deliver around 22,000 sites in phases. The infrastructure cost was approved at ₹4,500 crore, with the Supreme Court monitoring progress. An extension of the layout by an additional 2,095 acres is also under acquisition, and a separate 2,000-acre layout across 22 villages beyond Whitefield in East Bengaluru has been proposed as a further extension.

==== D. Devaraj Urs Layout, KC Reddy Layout and S. Nijalingappa Layout — proposed/stalled ====
These three layouts were announced alongside NPKL and Karanth Layout under the Master Plan 2015 programme, with a combined site delivery target of at least 90,000 across all five projects. Land acquisition for these three has not progressed significantly due to the high cost of compensating landowners under current acquisition law.

=== PRR-2 corridor layouts — proposed ===
In August 2025, the BDA secured state government approval to acquire approximately 6,217 acres for six new residential layouts alongside the Peripheral Ring Road-2 (PRR-2) corridor, connecting Hosur Road to Mysuru Road via Bannerghatta and Kanakapura Roads. Villages identified for acquisition include BM Kaval, Gulikamale, Kaggalipura, OB Choodanahalli, Agara, Uttari, Devagere, Gudimavu, and Kambipura Gangasandra. Together, the six layouts are targeted to deliver 50,000 new sites using the same 40:60 compensation model used in NPKL. As of late 2025, land surveys were underway and preliminary notifications had not yet been issued.

== Infrastructure Projects ==
=== Completed ===
==== Outer Ring Road ====
The Outer Ring Road (ORR) is a 60-kilometre circumferential highway planned and built by the BDA to divert heavy vehicles from inner-city roads and support the city's expansion as an IT hub. Different sections were opened progressively between 1996 and 2002. It connects major national and state highways across Hebbal, KR Puram, Marathahalli, Silk Board, JP Nagar and Nayandahalli junctions.

The Hebbal Flyover, built as part of the ORR network, won an award at the 9th Outstanding Bridge National Awards competition organised by the Indian Institute of Bridge Engineers.

==== KR Puram Flyover ====
The KR Puram Flyover, at the Krishnarajapura junction on the Outer Ring Road, was built by the BDA to ease traffic at one of the ORR's most congested eastern intersections.

==== Madiwala Underpass ====
The Madiwala Underpass was constructed by the BDA to facilitate traffic movement at the Madiwala junction on the ORR.

=== Ongoing ===
==== Hebbal Flyover Augmentation ====
The Hebbal Flyover Augmentation project is a ₹225 crore BDA-executed expansion of the existing Hebbal junction flyover on Airport Road in north Bengaluru. The expansion includes a three-lane elevated road from Airport Road towards the city and a three-lane underpass on the Yeshwantpur–KR Puram route. Work was halted in 2019 and restarted in January 2023 after redesign to avoid conflicts with BMRCL's Metro Line 2B. In February 2025, the BDA stated it had completed 12 of 17 spans in the KR Puram down-ramp and committed to a deadline of April 2025 for the KR Puram-to-city loop, set by the Chief Secretary.

=== Proposed ===
==== Peripheral Ring Road (Bengaluru Business Corridor) — Phase 1 ====
The Peripheral Ring Road (PRR), rebranded as the Bengaluru Business Corridor (BBC) in January 2024, is an 8-lane, 100-metre-wide access-controlled greenfield expressway of approximately 73.5 km, connecting Tumakuru Road in the north-west to Hosur Road in the south-east via Bellary Road, Old Madras Road and Sarjapur Road. The project, estimated at ₹27,000 crore, is to be developed on a PPP-DBFOT (Design-Build-Finance-Operate-Transfer) model, with the winning concessionaire granted toll collection rights for 50 years. The alignment will feature 16 flyovers, 10 overpasses, and 12 underpasses at major junctions including Hesarghatta Road, Old Madras Road, Whitefield Road, Channasandra Road and Hosur Road.

The project has a long and contested history. Initial approvals and land acquisition began in 2006, but were challenged in the Karnataka High Court by affected landowners. The High Court annulled the project in 2011 due to implementation delays; the government revived a reduced 65-km alignment in 2013, and the Supreme Court approved land acquisition in July 2013 with the exception of 372 acres identified in 2010. An environment clearance was granted by the Ministry of Environment, Forest and Climate Change in 2014, subject to 20 binding directions to the BDA covering afforestation, rainwater harvesting, and the protection of heritage trees. A final land acquisition notification for approximately 750 acres was being prepared as of September 2024, after a preliminary notification was issued in April 2020. Farmers displaced by the project pressed for either fair compensation or withdrawal of the project at a protest meeting in October 2024, noting that the final notification to acquire 1,810 acres had been issued back in 2007 and the BDA had failed to implement the project within five years as required by its own rules. The deadline for completion is December 2027. As of early 2025, the project was under bidding; no concessionaire had been finalised.

==== Peripheral Ring Road Phase 2 (PRR-2) ====
PRR-2 is a proposed 30-kilometre extension of the Bengaluru Business Corridor connecting Hosur Road to Mysuru Road via Bannerghatta and Kanakapura Roads. Land acquisition for the Hosur Road–Mysuru Road segment alone requires approximately 860 acres. As of November 2025, BDA had acquired 321 acres for the 10-km Mysuru Road–Magadi Road segment as part of the NPKL network and was applying the 40:60 land-for-cash compensation model to advance acquisition for the remaining stretches.

== Lake and Green Space Restoration ==
The BDA has historically been the custodian of a number of lakes and parks within the Bengaluru Metropolitan Area. Following the expansion of the BBMP in 2007, 22 lakes previously managed by the BDA were transferred to the BBMP.

=== Lakes ===
- Agara Lake — BDA undertook restoration and beautification of the 98-acre lake in HSR Layout; subsequent development works were later led by the Karnataka Lake Conservation and Development Authority (KLCDA).
- Benniganahalli Lake — Restored by the BDA.
- Lalbagh lake — Restored by the BDA; the BDA installed a 1.5 MLD water treatment plant at the lake as part of the restoration.
- Bellandur Lake and Varthur Lake — The BDA submitted a Detailed Project Report to the Urban Development Department proposing a ₹200 crore restoration for Bellandur Lake and ₹170 crore for Varthur Lake, and was directed by the National Green Tribunal (NGT) to approach the NGT's monitoring committee jointly with the BBMP on restoration matters.

=== Parks ===
- Cubbon Park — The BDA has undertaken rejuvenation works at the 300-acre park, including proposals to install a 1.5 MLD treatment plant, design pathways, improve illumination, and repair sewerage lines.

== Criticism ==
- Encroachment on and development over water bodies and tanks essential to the city's natural drainage.
- Persistent failure to provide basic infrastructure — power, water, sewerage and drainage — to residential layouts while embarking on new projects. Residents of Arkavathy Layout waited over 12 years for electricity connections.
- Failure to rehabilitate villagers displaced by layout acquisition schemes.
- The Arkavathy Layout denotification controversy, in which hundreds of allottees who had paid in full and received lease-cum-sale agreements lost their sites through successive government denotifications.
- The Karnataka High Court has on multiple occasions strongly criticised the BDA — calling it the "mother of corruption" on one occasion and describing it as acting like a real estate agency rather than a planning body on another.
- Despite the 74th Constitutional Amendment mandating devolution to elected urban bodies, the BDA has remained largely unaccountable to local constituencies through an electoral process.
- The influence of vested interests — described in press reports as a "land mafia" — in the violation of land use regulations and the capture of prime development sites.
- Service delivery outcomes declining over time despite significant growth in BDA revenues, when adjusted for population and inflation.
- A 14-year court battle by an Infosys employee to obtain possession of an auctioned BDA site highlighted the depth of legal uncertainty surrounding BDA-allocated properties.
- The Hebbal Flyover, built in 2003, was assessed as having already outlived its purpose due to unmanageable traffic volumes, raising questions about the BDA's long-term planning capacity.
- The Draft Revised Master Plan 2031 was boycotted by citizen groups at public hearings in 2017, who argued it bypassed the constitutionally created Bangalore Metropolitan Planning Committee and set unrealistic population projections.

== See also ==
- Greater Bengaluru Authority
- Bangalore Metropolitan Region Development Authority
- Bengaluru Metropolitan Area
- Bengaluru Urban district
- Bengaluru North district
- Bengaluru South district
- Outer Ring Road (Bangalore)
- Peripheral Ring Road (Bengaluru Business Corridor)
- Satellite Town Ring Road
- Bangalore Metropolitan Planning Committee
- Bangalore Metropolitan Transport Corporation
- Bruhat Bengaluru Mahanagara Palike
- Bengaluru Central City Corporation
- Bengaluru North City Corporation
- Bengaluru South City Corporation
- Bengaluru East City Corporation
- Bengaluru West City Corporation
