= Bangalore Metropolitan Planning Committee =

Bengaluru Metropolitan Planning Committee
Committee overview
- Formed: 8 June 2018
- Jurisdiction: Government of Karnataka

The Bangalore Metropolitan Planning Committee (BMPC) is a metropolitan planning body comprising 30 members, and tasked with the responsibility of preparing a draft 5-year development plan for the Bangalore metropolitan region. The formation and activities of the BMPC represents a long struggle between activists and successive governments of Karnataka over the devolution of planning powers to local authorities as per the Constitution (74th) Amendment Act, 1992. Currently ambiguity surrounds the function and authority of the BMPC given that its mandate overlaps with the powers of the Bangalore Development Authority (BDA), the de facto planning authority for the Bangalore metropolitan region.

== Background ==
The BMPC was formed according to the requirements of The Constitution (74th) Amendment Act, 1992. This Act mandated the formation of a planning authority for each metropolitan area and tasked it with the responsibility of preparing a draft development plan. Due to the reluctance of the successive Governments of Karnataka to shift planning responsibilities from the Bangalore Development Authority (BDA) to a Metropolitan Planning Committee (MPC), this amendment was not implemented for more than 20 years.

When the Siddaramaiah government moved to set up a new Bangalore task force in March 2014 called the Vision Group, activists successfully petitioned the High Court to stay the task force until the formation of a BMPC. Following notification of the Draft Metropolitan Planning Committee Rules by the Government of Karnataka in 2013, the formation of a Bangalore Metropolitan Planning Committee (BMPC) was formalized in January 2014 following pressure by the High Court of Karnataka.

T R Raghunandan, former Joint Secretary, Panchayati Raj, Government of India described the MPC rules as "symptomatic of a much deeper dysfunctionality" due to the fact that planning responsibilities are currently concentrated in the hands of parastatals such as the BDA and BMRDA which were created prior to the 74th amendment. For the MPC to work properly, Karnataka will need to reform the whole planning system to factor in the spirit and requirements of the amendment.

The first Committee had 30 members comprising elected corporators from the BBMP, commissioners from other civic agencies and ministers of the state legislature. The chairman of the Committee was the Chief Minister of Karnataka. Having formed the BMPC at the behest of the court, and under pressure from activists, the government showed little enthusiasm for the committee and no meetings where called between September 2014 and February 2016, after which it was dissolved.

A new committee was elected in February 2016 and has met on several occasions since then, albeit with members reporting that the meeting are informal and lasted no more than a few minutes over a cup of tea.

In June 2018, following government efforts to appoint a new expert led advisory committee, the Bengaluru Blueprint Task Force, the High Court directed the Government to transfer all documents to the BMPC.

On 11 December 2020, the government passed a new municipal law applicable to the BBMP — the Bruhat Bengaluru Mahanagara Palike Act 2020 - separating it from the Karnataka Municipal Corporations Act 1976. The new law allows for the creation of a Metropolitan Planning Committee to prepare a development plan for Bangalore. Civic advocacy groups have criticised the proposed committee powers as “weak” and lacking the necessary powers to solve urban problems

== See also ==
- Bangalore Agenda Task Force
- Bengaluru Blueprint Action Group
- Bangalore Development Authority
