= Govindraj Nagar Assembly constituency =

Legislative Assembly constituency in Karnataka, India

Coordinates: 12.972°N 77.529°E

Govindraj Nagar
- Constituency No. 166 for the Karnataka Legislative Assembly

Constituency details
- Country: India
- Region: South India
- State: Karnataka
- District: Bangalore Urban
- Lok Sabha constituency: Bangalore South
- Established: 2008
- Total electors: 296,389 (2023)
- Reservation: None

Member of Legislative Assembly
- 16th Karnataka Legislative Assembly
- Incumbent Priya Krishna
- Party: Indian National Congress
- Elected year: 2023
- Preceded by: V. Somanna

Govindraj Nagar Assembly constituency is one of the 224 constituencies in the Karnataka Legislative Assembly of Karnataka, a southern state of India. It is also part of Bangalore South Lok Sabha constituency.

== Members of the Legislative Assembly ==
Election	Member	Party
2008	V. Somanna	Indian National Congress
2009 By-election	Priya Krishna	Indian National Congress
2013	Priya Krishna	Indian National Congress
2018	V. Somanna	Bharatiya Janata Party
2023	Priya Krishna	Indian National Congress

== Election results ==
=== Assembly Election 2023 ===
2023 Karnataka Legislative Assembly election : Govindraj Nagar
Party	Candidate	Votes	%	±%
INC	Priya Krishna	82,134	50.87%	▲7.77
BJP	K. Umesh Shetty	69,618	43.12%	▼7.21
JD(S)	R. Prakash	4,583	2.84%	▼1.67
UPP	Balakrishna. M	2,148	1.33%	New
NOTA	None of the above	1,504	0.93%	▼0.08
Margin of victory		12,516	7.75%	▲0.52
Turnout		161,567	54.51%	▲0.82
Total valid votes		161,453		
Registered electors		296,389		▲1.16
INC gain from BJP		Swing	▲0.54	

=== Assembly Election 2018 ===
2018 Karnataka Legislative Assembly election : Govindraj Nagar
Party	Candidate	Votes	%	±%
BJP	V. Somanna	79,135	50.33%	▲27.66
INC	Priyakrishna	67,760	43.10%	▼11.45
JD(S)	A. Nagendra Prasad	7,090	4.51%	▼11.00
NOTA	None of the above	1,589	1.01%	New
Margin of victory		11,375	7.23%	▼24.65
Turnout		157,312	53.69%	▼1.13
Total valid votes		157,231		
Registered electors		292,976		▲22.33
BJP gain from INC		Swing	▼4.22	

=== Assembly Election 2013 ===
2013 Karnataka Legislative Assembly election : Govindraj Nagar
Party	Candidate	Votes	%	±%
INC	Priya Krishna	72,654	54.55%	▲3.92
BJP	H. Ravindra	30,194	22.67%	▼23.83
JD(S)	T. M. Range Gowda	20,662	15.51%	New
KJP	P. Doddaiah	5,227	3.92%	New
Margin of victory		42,460	31.88%	▲27.75
Turnout		131,299	54.82%	▲9.25
Total valid votes		133,197		
Registered electors		239,496		▼13.89
INC hold		Swing	▲3.92	

=== Assembly By-election 2009 ===
2009 Karnataka Legislative Assembly by-election : Govindraj Nagar
Party	Candidate	Votes	%	±%
INC	Priya Krishna	64,176	50.63%	▼0.38
BJP	V. Somanna	58,937	46.50%	▲18.81
Margin of victory		5,239	4.13%	▼19.19
Turnout		126,752	45.57%	▲3.18
Total valid votes		126,749		
Registered electors		278,129		▲12.84
INC hold		Swing	▼0.38	

=== Assembly Election 2008 ===
2008 Karnataka Legislative Assembly election : Govindraj Nagar
Party	Candidate	Votes	%	±%
INC	V. Somanna	53,297	51.01%	New
BJP	R. Ravindra	28,935	27.69%	New
JD(S)	T. M. Range Gowda	19,155	18.33%	New
BSP	Ravikumar	1,017	0.97%	New
JD(U)	L. S. Kumaraswamy	657	0.63%	New
Margin of victory		24,362	23.32%	
Turnout		104,492	42.39%	
Total valid votes		104,485		
Registered electors		246,476		
INC win (new seat)				

== See also ==
- Bangalore Urban district
- List of constituencies of Karnataka Legislative Assembly
