= Akhanda Srinivas Murthy =

Indian politician

R Akhanda Srinivas Murthy

Member of Karnataka Legislative Assembly
- In office 2013–2023
- Preceded by: B. Prasanna Kumar
- Succeeded by: A C Srinivas
- Constituency: Pulakeshinagar

Personal details
- Party: Bharatiya Janata Party (from 2024)
- Other political affiliations: Janata Dal (Secular) (till 2018); Indian National Congress (2018-2023)

R Akhanda Srinivas Murthy is an Indian politician and a former member of the Karnataka Legislative Assembly representing the Pulakeshinagar constituency as a member of the Indian National Congress. He was previously a representative of the constituency from 2013 to 2018 as a member of the Janata Dal (Secular), following which he resigned to join the Indian National Congress and was elected for a second term securing the highest margin of victory in the 2018 Karnataka Legislative Assembly election.

In August 2020, a violent riot broke out in Bangalore, provoked by an inflammatory Facebook post on Muhammad that was allegedly shared by the nephew of Murthy.

On 16 April 2023, Murthy resigned as the INC MLA from the Pulakeshinagar constituency after being denied a ticket for the 2023 elections. In 2024, he joined the Bharatiya Janata Party.
