= 1993 elections in India =

Elections in India
- 1993

Elections in the Republic of India in 1993 included elections to nine state legislative assemblies and to seats in the Rajya Sabha.

== Overall result ==
Polling Date(s)	State	Government before	Chief Minister before	Government after	Elected Chief Minister	Maps
15 February 1993	Tripura	President's Rule		Communist Party of India (Marxist)	Dasarath Deb	
15 February 1993	Nagaland	President's Rule		Indian National Congress	S. C. Jamir	
19 February 1993	Meghalaya	Indian National Congress	D. D. Lapang	Indian National Congress	S. C. Marak	
11 September 1993	Himachal Pradesh	President's Rule		Indian National Congress	Virbhadra Singh	
6 November 1993	Delhi	Elections were not conducted to the assembly of Delhi		Bharatiya Janata Party	Madan Lal Khurana	
11 November 1993	Rajasthan	President's Rule		Bharatiya Janata Party	Bhairon Singh Shekhawat	
October-November 1993	Uttar Pradesh	President's Rule		Samajwadi Party	Mulayam Singh Yadav	
24 November 1993	Madhya Pradesh	President's Rule		Indian National Congress	Digvijaya Singh	
30 November 1993	Mizoram	Indian National Congress	Lal Thanhawla	Indian National Congress	Lal Thanhawla	

== Legislative Assembly elections ==
=== Delhi ===
Party	Votes	%	Seats
Bharatiya Janata Party		47.82	49
Indian National Congress		34.48	14
Janata Dal		12.65	4
Bahujan Samaj Party		1.88	0
Communist Party (Marxist)		0.38	0
Communist Party		0.21	0
Janata Party		0.20	0
Shiv Sena		0.14	0
All India Forward Bloc		0.03	0
Unrecognised parties		1.29	0
Independents		5.92	3
Invalid/blank votes	60,902	–	–
Total	3,612,713	100	70
Registered voters/turnout	5,850,545	61.75	–
Source: ECI

=== Himachal Pradesh ===
Party	Votes	%	Seats	+/–
Indian National Congress	1,135,203	48.82	52	+43
Bharatiya Janata Party	840,233	36.13	8	–38
Communist Party of India (Marxist)	17,347	0.75	1	+1
Others	105,475	4.54	0	0
Independents	227,050	9.76	7	+6
Total	2,325,308	100.00	68	0
Valid votes	2,325,308	99.22		
Invalid/blank votes	18,305	0.78		
Total votes	2,343,613	100.00		
Registered voters/turnout	3,277,625	71.50		
Source: ECI

=== Madhya Pradesh ===
SN	Party	Seats Contested	Seats won	Seats Changed	% Votes
1	Indian National Congress	318	174	118	40.67%
2	Bharatiya Janata Party	320	117	-103	38.82%
3	Bahujan Samaj Party	286	11	+9	7.05%
4	Janata Dal	257	4	-24	1.87
5	Communist Party of India	63	2	-1	0.98%
6	Chhattisgarh Mukti Morcha	23	1	+ 1	0.40%
7	Communist Party of India (Marxist)	16	1	0	0.32%
8	Krantikari Samajwadi Manch	4	1	0	0.21%
9	Republican Party of India (Kamble)	10	1	+ 1	0.10%
10	Independent	320	8	-2	5.88%
	Total		320		

=== Meghalaya ===
← Summary of the 19 February 1993 Meghalaya Legislative Assembly election results →
Parties and coalitions	Popular vote			Seats	
Parties and coalitions	Votes	%	±pp	Won	+/−
Indian National Congress (INC)	282,139	34.62	1.97 ▲	24	2 ▲
Hill People's Union (HPU)	175,487	21.53	5.31 ▼	11	8 ▼
Hill State People's Democratic Party (HDP)	79,824	9.8	2.88 ▼	8	2 ▲
All Party Hill Leaders Conference (Armison Marak Group)	64,603	7.93	3.25 ▲	3	1 ▲
Bharatiya Janata Party (BJP)	29,948	3.68		0	
Meghalaya Progressive People's Party (MPPP)	20,117	2.47		2	
Public Demands Implementation Convention (PDIC)	17,423	2.14	1.06 ▼	2	Steady
Janata Dal (B)	2,586	0.32		0	
Communist Party of India (CPI)	1,138	0.14	0.22 ▼	0	Steady
Janata Party	841	0.1		0	
Independents (IND)	140,793	17.28	2.31 ▼	10	1 ▲
Total	814,899	100.00		60	±0
Source: Election Commission of India

=== Mizoram ===
Party	Votes	%	Seats	+/–
Indian National Congress	106,320	33.10	16	▼7
Mizo National Front	129,813	40.41	14	0
Bharatiya Janata Party	10,004	3.11	0	New
Independents	75,097	23.38	10	▲8
Total	321,234	100.00	40	0
Valid votes	321,234	99.05		
Invalid/blank votes	3,089	0.95		
Total votes	324,323	100.00		
Registered voters/turnout	401,669	80.74		
Source: ECI

=== Nagaland ===
Party	Votes	%	Seats	+/–
Indian National Congress	335,834	45.95	35	–1
Nagaland Peoples Council	239,505	32.77	17	New
Democratic Labour Party	3,755	0.51	1	New
Bharatiya Janata Party	3,755	0.51	0	New
Independents	148,074	20.26	7	+7
Total	730,923	100.00	60	0
Valid votes	730,923	99.29		
Invalid/blank votes	5,206	0.71		
Total votes	736,129	100.00		
Registered voters/turnout	802,911	91.68		
Source: ECI

=== Rajasthan ===
Party	Seats
Bharatiya Janata Party	95
Indian National Congress	76
Janata Dal	6
Communist Party of India (Marxist)	1
Independents	21
Total	199

=== Tripura ===
Performance of the political parties in this election
Party	Seats contested	Seats won	No. of votes	% of votes	1988 Seats
Bharatiya Janata Party	38	0	27,078	2.02%	0
Communist Party of India	2	0	18,058	1.35%	0
Communist Party of India (Marxist)	51	44	599,943	44.78%	26
Indian National Congress	46	10	438,561	32.73%	25
Janata Dal(B)	2	1	20,981	1.57%	-
All India Forward Block	1	1	10,658	0.80%	0
Revolutionary Socialist Party	2	2	21,235	1.58%	2
Tripura Upajati Juba Samiti	14	1	100,742	7.52%	-
Amra Bangali	42	0	19,592	1.46%	-
Independents	207	1	82,541	6.16%	0
Total	407	60	1,339,838		

=== Uttar Pradesh ===
Party name	Seats
Bharatiya Janata Party (BJP)	177
Samajwadi Party (SP)	109
Bahujan Samaj Party (BSP)	67
Communist Party of India (CPI)	3
Communist Party of India (Marxist) (CPM)	1
Indian National Congress (INC)	28
Janata Dal (JD)	27
Janata Party (JP)	1
Uttarakhand Kranti Dal (UKD)	1
Independents	8
Total	422
