= Jayaprakash Muliyil =

Indian epidemiologist

Jayaprakash Muliyil is an Indian epidemiologist and chairperson of the Scientific Advisory Committee of the National Institute of Epidemiology. He is also a former principal of the Christian Medical College, Vellore.

He completed his undergraduate studies in Medicine and postgraduate studies in Community Medicine from Christian Medical College, Vellore. After that he joined as a faculty member in charge of the leprosy control programme at the Community Health and Development (CHAD) programme. In 1985, he went to Johns Hopkins University at Baltimore for further research, where he completed professional degrees of public health MPH and Doctor of Public Health (Dr.P.H.) in Epidemiology at JHSPH Department of Epidemiology.
