= Jayaprakash Nagar =

Jayaprakash Nagar may refer to the following places in India:

- Jayaprakash Nagar, Bengaluru
  - Jaya Prakash Nagar metro station
- Jayaprakash Nagar, Mysore

== See also ==
- Jayaprakash Narayan, Indian politician and activist after whom these places are named
