= Priya Krishna (politician) =

Indian politician

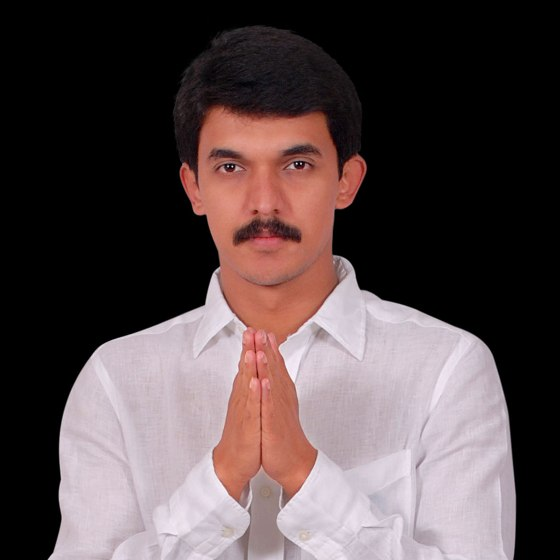

Member of the Karnataka Legislative Assembly
- Incumbent
- Assumed office 2023
- Preceded by: V. Somanna
- Constituency: Govindraj Nagar
- In office 2009–2018
- Preceded by: V. Somanna
- Succeeded by: V. Somanna
- Constituency: Govindraj Nagar

Personal details
- Born: 27 April 1984 (age 42) Bengaluru, India
- Party: Indian National Congress
- Parent(s): M. Krishnappa; Priyadarshini
- Education: Bangalore University, Mysore University
- Occupation: Businessman; Politician
- Website: www.priyakrishna.com

Priya Krishna (born 27 April 1984) is an Indian politician from Karnataka. He is a member of the Indian National Congress.

He was elected as a member of the Legislative Assembly of Karnataka from Govindraj Nagar, Bangalore in 2009. He was the youngest member of the Legislative Assembly of Karnataka at age 25.

== Early life ==
Priya Krishna is the elder son of Smt. Priyadarshini and M. Krishnappa ex-minister, Karnataka.

After his B.A. graduation with honors and LLB degree from Bangalore University, he finished his master's degree in political science from Mysore University.

== Career ==
Priya Krishna entered politics in 2003, when he became an active member of the Karnataka Pradesh Congress Party (KPCC). He got elected as MLA after contesting the Govindraj Nagar elections.

In the 2013 general elections, Krishna battled the Bharatiya Janata Party. Somanna shifted his constituency and took on Krishna's father M Krishnappa in the neighboring Vijayanagara Assembly constituency.

Priya Krishna won and retained his seat in the 2013 Karnataka Assembly Elections with 42,460 votes, securing 55.36% of the total.

== Affidavit and assets ==
Krishna was the richest candidate in the fray during 2018 Karnataka Assembly Elections by declaring a personal wealth of over ₹1,020 crore.

== Works ==
- Vijayanagar TTMC built with aid of JnNURM.
- Supported implementing Project Vruksha, a voluntary tree mapping project.
- The Magadi Road-Basaveshwaranagar Underpass. Built by BJP MLA V Somanna
- Planting the entire stretch of chord road with his face on the flex wishing his birthday.

== Controversies ==
Priya Krishna filed a defamation case against a Kannada channel for airing allegations of forest land encroachment against him and sought Rs 100 crore in damages and deposited Rs 52 lakh fee to the court.
