= Bangalore Metropolitan Region Development Authority =

Organization in Karnataka, India

- Beṅgaḷūru Mahānagara Pradēśābhivr̥d'dhi Prādhikāra
- Abbreviation: BMRDA
- Formation: 1985
- Type: Metropolitan Region Development Authority
- Purpose: Planning
- Headquarters: Bengaluru
- Location: Bengaluru Metropolitan Region (BMR)
- Official language: Kannada
- Commissioner: K P Mohanaraj
- Website: bmrda.karnataka.gov.in

The Bangalore Metropolitan Region Development Authority, officially Bengaluru Metropolitan Region Development Authority (BMRDA), is an autonomous body created by the Government of Karnataka under the BMRDA Act 1985 for the purpose of planning, co-ordinating and supervising the proper and orderly development of the areas within the Bengaluru Metropolitan Region (BMR) which comprises Bengaluru Urban district, Bengaluru North district and Bengaluru South District.

== Jurisdiction ==
BMRDA has its jurisdiction over the Bengaluru Metropolitan Region (BMR) which comprises the districts of Bengaluru Urban, Bengaluru Rural and Ramanagara.

== Area Planning Zones ==
The Area Planning Zones (APZs) are areas where urban development is permitted subject to certain regulations. Interstitial Zones (IZs) are the areas lying between the APZs; here, urban activities are restricted, giving more emphasis to environmental issues like conservation of forested areas, agriculture, etc. For planned urban growth, local planning areas under Karnataka Town & Country Planning Act, 1961, are declared in the five APZs and IZs 1 & 2. The following are the planning/ development authorities functioning in the Bengaluru Metropolitan Region (BMR):

1. Bengaluru Development Authority (BDA) - Bengaluru Metropolitan Area (BMA)
2. Ramanagara Urban Development Authority (RUDA) - Ramanagara Urban Area (RUA)
3. Anekal Planning Authority (APA) - Anekal Urban Area (APA)
4. Bengaluru International Airport Area Planning Authority (BIAAPA) - Kempegowda International Airport (KIA)
5. Hoskote Planning Authority (HPA) - Hosakote Urban Area (HUA)
6. Kanakapura Planning Authority (KPA) - Kanakapura Urban Area (KUA)
7. Magadi Planning Authority (MPA) - Magadi Urban Area (MUA)
8. Nelamangala Planning Authority - Nelamangala Urban Area (NUA)
9. Greater Bengaluru Development Authority (GBDA) - Greater Bengaluru Integrated Township Project (GBITP)
10. Satellite Town Ring Road Planning Authority (STRRPA) - Bengaluru Satellite Town Ring Road Project (BSTRRP)
11. Channapatna Planning Authority (CPA) - Channapatna Urban Area (CUA)
12. Doddaballapura Planning Authority (DPA) - Doddaballapura Urban Area (DUA)
