= M. H. Jayaprakashanarayan =

Indian politician

M. H. Jayaprakashanarayan was a Member of the legislative assembly (1926–1995) from Sirsi constituency to the Karnataka state, Bangalore. Then Veerendra Patil was the Chief Minister of the Karnataka state. He is the founder of Panchajanya Vidhyapeeta Welfare Trust.

He was a sitting MLA from Yelhanka constituency.

After his demise the trust is managed by members unconnected to the family of JP. He is fondly remembered on 21 December every year on his birthday.
