= Murthy =

Origin
- Language: Sanskrit
- Origin: mūrti (मूर्ति)
- Meaning: literally "manifestation, image"; see murti
- Region of origin: India

Other names
- Alternative spelling: Murthi, Murty, Murti, Moorthy, Moorthi, Murti, Moorty, Moorti, Mourthi

Murthy, Murthi, Murty, Murti or Moorthy, or similar variants, is a name from the South Indian states of Andhra Pradesh, Karnataka, Tamil Nadu, and Telangana. It is found commonly amongst Brahmins as a personal name or surname. It is often paired with names of Hindu gods and concepts, forming other names – e.g. Dakshinamurthy, Krishnamurthy, Satyamurthy, etc.

Notable people with the name include:

== Murthy ==
- A. N. Murthy Rao (1900–2003), Indian writer
- Akhanda Srinivas Murthy, Indian politician
- Anil Murthy (born 1973), Singaporean diplomat and sports executive
- Bandaru Satyanarayana Murthy, Indian politician
- Bayya Suryanarayana Murthy (1906–1979), Indian politician
- Bhamidipally Narasimha Murthy (born 1957), known as Bnim, Indian writer and cartoonist
- Bhattam Srirama Murthy (1926–2015), Indian politician
- Bommasandra Srinivasaiah Suryanarayana Murthy (1933–1985), known as Udaykumar, Indian actor, writer and film producer
- Borra Gopi Murthy, Indian politician
- Chitrapu Narayana Murthy (1913–1985), Indian film director and producer
- Chivukula Anjaneya Murthy (1958–2018), Indian scientist and academic
- D. Venkatesh Murthy, Indian social worker and politician
- Dipika Murthy (born 1980), Indian hockey player
- Geeta Guru-Murthy, British journalist
- Ghattamaneni Siva Rama Krishna Murthy (1943–2022), known as Krishna, Indian actor, director and film producer
- H. G. S. Murthy, Indian civil servant and space scientist
- H. K. Narasimha Murthy, Indian violinist
- H. M. Krishna Murthy, Indian researcher
- H. Narayan Murthy (1924–2011), Indian clinical psychologist, writer, philosopher and Sanskrit scholar
- H. R. Keshava Murthy (1934–2022), Indian Gamaka exponent
- I. N. Murthy (1925–2014), Indian film director
- Idream R. Murthy, Indian politician
- Janaki Srinivasa Murthy (born 1945), known as Vaidehi, Indian feminist writer
- Janga Krishna Murthy (born 1958), Indian politician
- Jayathi Murthy, Indian-American mechanical engineer
- K. E. Krishna Murthy (born 1938), Indian politician
- K. K. S. Murthy (1929–2025), Indian aeronautics engineer
- K. Ramachandra Murthy (born 1948), Indian journalist
- K. S. R. Murthy, Indian politician
- Kanaka Murthy (1942–2021), Indian sculptor
- Karagoda Uyangoda Maithri Murthy Thero (born 1948), Sri Lankan Buddhist monk
- Karanam Balaram Krishna Murthy (born 1946), Indian politician
- Karthikeya Murthy (born 1985), Indian composer, singer-songwriter
- Krishnan Guru-Murthy (born 1970), British television presenter and journalist
- Kusuma Murthy, Indian politician
- M. Chidananda Murthy (1931–2020), Indian writer, researcher and historian
- M. R. N. Murthy, Indian scientist and academic
- M. Rajasekara Murthy (1922–2010), Indian politician
- M. V. Chandrashekara Murthy (1939–2001), Indian politician
- M. V. Ramana Murthy, Indian coastal scientist and ocean engineer
- Mahesh Murthy (born 1965), Indian marketer, entrepreneur and investor
- Mala Murthy (born 1975), American neuroscientist
- Malladi Venkata Krishna Murthy (born 1949), Indian writer
- Mano Murthy, Indian musician and composer
- Mikkilineni Radhakrishna Murthy (1914–2011), Indian actor
- Mukkamala Krishna Murthy (1920–1982), Indian lawyer and actor
- Murthy Devarakonda, American computer scientist
- Murthy Rajan (born 1944), Indian cricketer
- N. R. Narayana Murthy (born 1946), Indian entrepreneur
- N. S. Satya Murthy (1936–1984), Indian physicist
- Niren Murthy, Indian bioengineer and academic
- Padmini Murthy, Indian medical doctor and academic
- Phaneesh Murthy, Indian businessman
- Prathibha Srikanth Murthy (1977–2005), Indian murder victim
- Prema Murthy (born 1969), American artist
- Punyamurthula Suryanarayana Murthy, known as Chitti Babu, Indian actor and comedian
- R. Narayana Murthy (born 1954), Indian film director and producer
- Ramakrishnan Murthy (born 1989), Indian singer
- S. S. Murthy (born 1946), Indian academic
- Sheela Murthy (born 1961), Indian lawyer and philanthropist
- Siva Narayana Murthy (1955–2022), Indian actor
- Sivaram Murthy, Indian researcher
- Srimushnam Srinivasa Murthy (1923–2009), Indian freedom fighter and writer
- Srinivasa Murthy (born 1949), Indian actor
- Srinivasa Murthy (dubbing artist) (1972–2023), Indian voice actor
- Sudha Murthy (born 1950), Indian educator, writer and philanthropist
- Sumathi Murthy, Indian musician, composer and LGBT right activist
- T. K. Murthy (born 1922), Indian Mridangam player
- Tammareddy Krishna Murthy (1920–2013), Indian film producer
- Thandava Murthy Muthu (born 1975), Indian weightlifter
- Tummala Seetharama Murthy (1901–1990), Indian poet
- U. R. Ananthamurthy (1932–2014), Indian writer and literary critic
- V. K. Murthy (1923–2014), Indian cinematographer
- V. S. R. Murthy (born 1959), former director of the Indian Coast Guard
- Veturi Sundararama Murthy (1936–2010), Indian poet
- Vidya Murthy (born 1956), Indian actress
- Vivek Murthy (born 1977), American medical doctor
- Yalamanchili Radhakrishna Murthy (died 2013), Indian medical doctor and politician

== Murty ==
- Akshata Murty (born 1980) Indian heiress and entrepreneur
- Ambareesh Murty (1971/72–2023), Indian entrepreneur and business executive
- B. R. Murty (1928–2003), Indian botanist
- Budaraju Srinivasa Murty (born 1964), Indian metallurgical engineer
- Graeme Murty (born 1974), English-born Scottish footballer
- Gurazada Srirama Murty (1851–1899), Indian writer, poet and editor
- K. Satchidananda Murty (1924–2011), Indian philosopher and academic
- M. Ram Murty (born 1953), Indian-Canadian mathematician
- Murty Kennedy (born 1956), Irish hurler
- P. M. Murty, Indian business executive
- Peesapati Narasimha Murty (1920–2007), Indian actor
- Ravula Suryanarayana Murty (born 1935), Indian writer, poet and journalist
- Rohan Murty (born 1982/83), Indian entrepreneur
- S. Murty Srinivasula, Indian cell biologist and academic
- Tad Murthy (1937–2018), Indian-Canadian oceanographer
- U. S. R. Murty, Indian academic

== Murthi ==
- Ahora Murthi Krishnasamy (c. 1949–1973), Singaporean murder victim
- J. V. Ramana Murthi (1933–2016), Indian actor
- M. V. V. S. Murthi (1938–2018), Indian politician, businessperson and teacher
- Murthi Nayanar, Nayanar saint
- Palanki Venkata Ramachandra Murthi (1909–2005), Indian children's writer

== Murti ==
- Ašok Murti (born 1962), Serbian wardrobe stylist
- Missula Suryanarayana Murti (1911–1973), Indian politician
- N. G. Krishna Murti (1910–1995), Indian civil engineer
- Ram Murti, Indian politician
- Ram Murti Verma (born 1965), Indian politician
- Tiruppattur R. Venkatachala Murti (1902–1986), Indian philosopher, writer, translator and academic

== Moorthy ==
- A. K. Moorthy (born 1964), Indian politician
- A. T. Moorthy (1928–2008), Sri Lankan diplomat
- Jarugu Narasimha Moorthy (born 1964), Indian organic photochemist and researcher
- Kanapathy Moorthy (1932–2010), Malaysian judoka
- Lanka Bhadradri Sri Ramachandra Moorthy (born 1952/56), known as L. B. Sriram, Indian actor, comedian, writer, playwright and producer
- M. Moorthy (1969–2005), corporal in the Malaysian Army
- P. Moorthy, Indian politician
- Rani Moorthy, Malaysian-born playwright, actress and producer
- Santha Moorthy (born 1979), Indian cricketer
- Tharun Moorthy, Indian film director and screenwriter
- V. Moorthy, Indian politician
- Vennira Aadai Moorthy (born 1936), Indian actor and comedian
- Waytha Moorthy Ponnusamy (born 1966), Malaysian lawyer and politician

=== Fictional characters ===
- Moorthy, the main character in Raja Rao's 1938 novel Kanthapura

== Mourthi ==
- Vignes Mourthi (1980–2003), Malaysian convicted drug trafficker
