= Krishnamurti =

- Pronunciation: /krɪʃnəˈmʊərti/ KRISH-nə-MOOR-tee
- Language: South Indian regional languages

Origin
- Language: Sanskrit
- Derivation: Krishna; Murti
- Meaning: in the image of Krishna
- Region of origin: South India

Other names
- Alternative spelling: see § Variants
- Variant form: Krishna Murti
- May be either a given name or a family name

Krishnamurti (/krɪʃnəˈmʊərti/ KRISH-nə-MOOR-tee) is a South Indian name. It has several variants.

== Variants ==
Some forms separate the name elements, e.g. Krishna Murti.
English language renditions generally follow corresponding variations of the name in regional Indian languages. The following is a non-exhaustive list.

- Krishnamoorthi
- Krishnamoorthy
- Krishnamoorti
- Krishnamoorty
- Krishnamurthi
- Krishnamurthy
- Krishnamurty

== Etymology and usage ==
It is a compound of Sanskrit origin, derived from the Hindu deity Krishna and the term murti (form), meaning "in the form (or image) of Krishna". In regional Indian naming conventions it is usually a given name, but it may also be a family name. In other cases it may be westernized as a surname.

== People ==
Non-Indian nationality is noted when known.

=== A ===
- Agri S. S. Krishnamurthy (b. 1959) – politician
- Anand Krishnamoorthi (b. 1990) – film sound designer, editor, and mixer
- Anuradha Krishnamoorthy (fl. 2010s) – social entrepreneur and cheesemaker
- Ashok Krishnamoorthy (fl. 2010s) – electrical engineer and IEEE Fellow

=== B ===
- Bhadriraju Krishnamurti (1928–2012) – Dravidian linguist
- Bhavani Narayanrao Krishnamurti Sharma or B. N. K. Sharma (1909–2005) – writer and scholar

=== E ===
- Ennapadam Srinivas Krishnamoorthy (b. 1966) – neuropsychiatrist

=== G ===
- Krishnamurthy Gobinathan (b. 1978) – Malaysian field hockey player and field hockey coach (Malaysia national)

=== H ===
- H.M. Krishna Murthy (fl. 1980s – c. 2000s) – former university researcher

=== J ===
- Jalakantapuram Ramaswamy Krishnamoorthy or J. R. Krishnamoorthy (fl. 1950s – c. 2010s) – medical doctor
- Jiddu Krishnamurti (1895–1986) – philosopher

=== K ===
- K. Krishnamurthy (1915–2011) – writer, publisher and political activist
- K. Jana Krishnamurthi or Jana Krishnamurthi (1928–2007) – politician
- Kambalapadu Ediga Krishnamurthy or K. E. Krishnamurthy (b. 1938) – politician
- Karanam Balaram Krishna Murthy (b. 1946) – politician
- Kaviraz Krishna Murthy Sastry or Sripada Krishnamurty Sastry (1866–1960) – Telugu-language poet
- Krishnasamy Krishnamoorthy or K. Krishnamoorthy (1944–2019) – politician

=== L ===
- Lakshmi Krishnamurti (1925–2009) – author and politician
- Lekshmi Krishnamoorthy (b. 1927 or 1928 – d. 2018) – actress

=== M ===
- Malathi Krishnamurthy Holla (b. 1958) – international parasports athlete
- Malladi Venkata Krishna Murthy (b. 1949) – Telugu-language writer
- Mukkamala Krishna Murthy or Mukkamala (1920–1987) – actor and film director
- Mungara Yamini Krishnamurthy or Yamini Krishnamurthy (1940–2024) – traditional and folk dancer

=== N ===
- N. Krishnamurthi Muniandy or Krishnamurthi Muniandy (b. 1980) – Malaysian cricketer (Malaysia national)
- Nandalal Krishnamoorthy or Nandu (b. 1965) – Malayalam-language actor
- Nedunuri Krishnamurthy (1927–2014) – classical Indian vocalist and art educator

=== P ===
- P. Krishnamoorthy (1943–2020) – film art director, production and costume designer
- Pallemoni Krishnamurthy or Pochiah Krishnamurthy (1947–1999) – cricketer
- Panchapakesa Krishnamurti or P. Krishnamurti (1903–1966) – scientist and industrialist
- Krishnamurthy Perumal (b. 1943) – athlete, field hockey player, coach and manager
- Krishnamoorthy Puranik (1911–1985) – educator and writer
- Purniah Narasinga Rao Krishnamurti or P. N. Krishnamurti (1849–1911) – lawyer and civil administrator

=== R ===
- R. Krishnamoorthy (fl. 1980s) – film director
- Raja Krishnamoorthy or Kitty (b. 1952) – actor and film director
- Krishnamurthy Rajagopalan Iyer or Krishnamurthy Rajagopalan (b. 1967) – cricketer
- Krishnamoorthy Rajannaidu (fl. 2010s) – Malaysian politician (Malaysia national)
- Ramaswamy Krishnamurthy or Kalki Krishnamurthy (1899–1954) – writer, journalist and Indian independence activist

=== S ===
- S. Krishnamoorthy (fl. 1980s) – politician
- S. Krishnamoorthy or Madhan Bob (b. 1953) – comedian and actor
- S. V. Krishnamoorthy Rao (1902–1968) – politician
- Krishnamurthy Santhanam (d. 2021) – nuclear scientist
- Sharada Krishnamurthy or Kavita Krishnamurti (b. 1958) – film playback singer
- Soorya Krishnamoorthy (b. 1952) – artist, arts administrator and scientist
- Srinath Krishnamoorthy (b. 1986) – novelist
- Subramanian Krishnamoorthy (1929–2014) – writer
- Subramanian Raja Krishnamoorthi or Raja Krishnamoorthi (b. 1973) – Illinois (US) businessman, lawyer, civil servant, and US Representative (US national)
- Suchitra Krishnamoorthi (b. 1975) – actor, writer, painter and singer

=== T ===
- Tammareddy Krishna Murthy (1920–2013) – film producer
- Taruvai Subayya Krishnamurthy or T. S. Krishnamurthy (b. 1941) – former Indian civil servant, including Chief Election Commissioner
- Thiru Krishnamoorthy or Thiru (b. 1979) – film director and screenwriter
- Tiruvalam Natarajan Krishnamurti or T. N. Krishnamurti (c. 1932 – 2018) – meteorologist and academic

=== U ===
- Uppaluri Gopala Krishnamurti or U. G. Krishnamurti (1918–2007) – philosopher

=== V ===
- V. Krishnamurthy Gounder (fl. 1960s – c. 1980s) – politician
- Vaidyanathan Krishnamurthy or V. Krishnamurthy (1929–2002) – veterinarian and conservationist
- Venkataraman Krishnamurthy or V. Krishnamurthy (1925–2022) – Indian civil servant and government advisor
- Krishnamurti Villanueva or Cris Villanueva (b. 1971) – Filipino film and television actor (Philippines national)

=== No other name ===
- Krishnamoorthy (b. 1963 or 1964 – d. 2019) – comedic actor in Tamil cinema

== See also ==
- Murthy – a related South Indian name
