= Sumathi =

Sumati or Sumathi may refer to:

- Sumathi (actress) (born 1964), popular Tamil actress
- Sumati Kshetramade (1913–1997), Indian Marathi writer
- Sumati Morarjee (1909–1998), Indian shipowner
- Sumathi Murthy, Indian vocalist, composer, and activist
- Sumati Mutatkar (1916–2007), Indian vocalist and musicologist
- Sumati Oraon, Indian politician
- Sumati (astronomer) (6th-10th century AD), Nepali astronomer
- Sumatinatha, 5th Jain Tirthankara
- Sumati (mythology), mother of 60,000 sons of King Sagara in Hindu mythology
- Sumati, also known as Sumedha, a previous life of the Buddha
- Sumati, mother of the Hindu god Kalki
- Sumati, a character in the 2024 Indian sci-fi film Kalki 2898 AD, portrayed by Deepika Padukone
- Sumathi Satakam, a type of Telugu poetry written by Baddena
- Sumathi (1942 film), a Telugu film
