= 2001 Bangalore Mahanagara Palike election =

- 11 November 2001

100 of 100 seats in the Bangalore Mahanagara Palike 51 seats needed for a majority

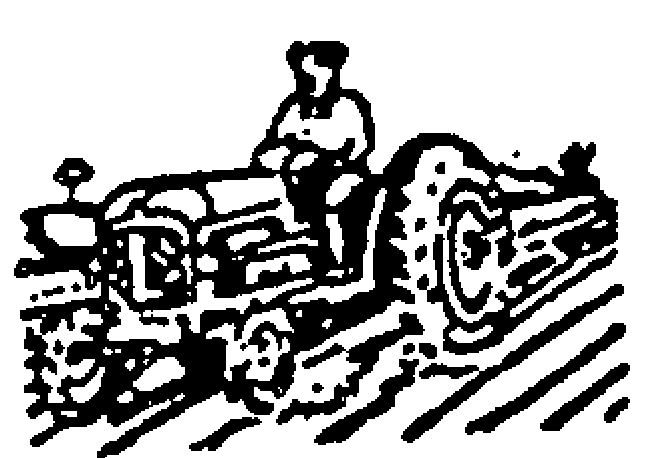
	Majority party	Minority party	Third party
Party	Indian National Congress	Bharatiya Janata Party	Janata Dal (Secular)
Seats won	57	15	13
BMP majority before election
INC
Elected BMP majority
INC

The 2001 Bangalore Mahanagara Palike (Bangalore City Corporation) election was held on 11 November 2001 in all 100 Wards of Bangalore

== Background ==
The tenure of the Bangalore Mahanagara Palike ended on 23 November 2001. A new election was necessary to elect new Corporators and Mayor

=== Organization ===
New Mayor will be elected for a term of one year and Corporators will be in office for 5 years

== Schedule ==
The schedule of the election was announced by the State Election Commission on 3 October 2011. It announced that polling would be held in a single phase on 11 November and that results would be declared on 12 November 2001. It also declared that the provisions of the Model Code of Conduct came into force with immediate effect" with the said announcement.

Event	Date	Day
Date for Notification of Election	17 October 2001	Wednesday
Last date for filing nominations	24 October 2001	Wednesday
Date for scrutiny of nominations	27 October 2001	Saturday
Last date for withdrawal of candidatures	29 October 2001	Monday
Date and Time on which poll shall if necessary be taken	11 November 2001	Sunday (From 7:00 AM to 5:00 PM)
Date of counting	12 November 2001	Thursday
Date before which the election shall be completed	15 November 2001	Thursday

== Results ==
=== List of winning candidates ===
Ward No.	Ward Name	Zone	Sub-Division	Population (2001)			Elected Corporator (2001 elections)		
Ward No.	Ward Name	Zone	Sub-Division	Total	SCs	STs	Corporator Name	Party	Reservation category
1	HMT	West	Yeshwanthpura	27637	6146	935	Narayanaswamy	Indian National Congress	Scheduled Caste
2	Jalahalli	West	Yeshwanthpura	36125	5153	1110	Nanjundappa B R	Janata Dal (Secular)	General
3	Yeshwanthpura	West	Yeshwanthpura	46677	4119	675	Mahalakshmi B K Venkatesh	Janata Dal (Secular)	General (Women)
4	Mathikere	West	Sanjayanagar	54704	4541	997	G Basavaraju	Indian National Congress	General
5	Kodandaramapura	West	Malleshwaram	36287	2088	313	N Venkatesh	Indian National Congress	General
6	Dattatreya Temple	West	Malleshwaram	38723	4714	261	V Shrinivas	Indian National Congress	Backward Category A
7	Malleshwaram	West	Malleshwaram	37760	4186	274	B Muniraju	Indian National Congress	Backward Category A
8	Gayathrinagar	West	Gayathrinagar	40673	1056	249	Nagaraj C M	Indian National Congress	General
9	Subrahmanyanagar	West	Mahalakshmipura	38905	1081	326	B N Nirmala	Bharatiya Janata Party	General (Women)
10	Mahalakshmipura	West	Mahalakshmipura	34702	5163	341	S D Jayamma	Indian National Congress	General (Women)
11	Peenya Industrial Town	West	Mahalakshmipura	35403	4554	1137	A Krishnappa	Indian National Congress	General
12	Nandini Layout	West	Mahalakshmipura	43445	4814	655	B M Narasimhamurthy	Indian National Congress	General
13	Geleyarabalaga	West	Gayathrinagar	38743	1022	309	M Nagaraj	Indian National Congress	Backward Category A
14	Nagapura	West	Gayathrinagar	36918	2622	353	N. L. Narendra Babu	Indian National Congress	General
15	Rajajinagar	West	Rajajinagar	37005	2234	269	S Rajanna	Indian National Congress	Backward Category B
16	Kamalanagar	West	Rajajinagar	61314	7301	625	M Shivaraju	Independent	General
17	Vrishabhavathinagar	West	Srirama Mandir	29275	546	279	Chandramma	Janata Dal (Secular)	Backward Category A (Women)
18	Kamakshipalya	West	Srirama Mandir	25742	2004	321	Revamma	Indian National Congress	Backward Category A (Women)
19	Basaveshwaranagar	West	Rajajinagar	23228	1207	206	Umavathi Padmaraj	Bharatiya Janata Party	Backward Category A (Women)
20	Shivanagara	West	Rajajinagar	28121	680	229	H Ramakrishnaiah	Indian National Congress	Backward Category A
21	Rajajinagar Industrial Town	West	Srirama Mandir	47682	5061	730	M Shrinivas	Indian National Congress	Backward Category A
22	Srirama Mandir	West	Srirama Mandir	41471	1087	327	G Shrinivas	Indian National Congress	Backward Category A
23	Prakashnagar	West	Gayathrinagar	35465	1994	140	G. Padmavathi	Indian National Congress	General (Women)
24	Bhashyamnagar	West	Gandhinagar	34595	10651	170	M Muniraju	Indian National Congress	Scheduled Caste
25	Ramachandrapura	West	Gandhinagar	35411	4343	272	Lakshmi N	Independent	Backward Category A (Women)
26	Sevashrama	West	Gandhinagar	37507	12398	516	Nagaraj V	Independent	General
27	Gandhinagar	West	Gandhinagar	32809	6296	158	Vasanthakumari M S	Indian National Congress	Scheduled Caste (Women)
28	Chikkapete	West	Chikkapete	31851	219	89	R Gayathri Ramachandra	Bharatiya Janata Party	General (Women)
29	Cottonpet	West	Chikkapete	40704	2765	305	N Gowramma	Janata Dal (Secular)	Backward Category A (Women)
30	Sir Krishnarajendra Market	West	Chikkapete	39521	17616	344	Syed Jaleel	Indian National Congress	Backward Category A
31	Binnipet	South	Binnipet	28069	2466	622	Mahadevamma	Indian National Congress	General (Women)
32	Kempapura Agrahara	South	Binnipet	40047	1354	1078	Dundegowda C	Janata Dal (Secular)	General
33	Vijayanagar	South	Binnipet	40867	1534	282	Raveendra	Indian National Congress	General
34	R P C Layout	South	Binnipet	44368	4668	460	H Jayaram	Indian National Congress	Backward Category A
35	Marenahalli	South	Govindarajanagar	40131	1759	669	Nagarathna	Indian National Congress	General (Women)
36	Govindarajanagar	South	Govindarajanagar	56340	3216	689	G Krishnappa	Indian National Congress	General
37	Amarajyothinagar	South	Govindarajanagar	21896	647	464	B. S. Puttaraju	Indian National Congress	General
38	Moodalapalya	South	Govindarajanagar	15597	890	237	N. Shanthakumari	Indian National Congress	General
39	Chandra Layout	South	Nagarabhavi	40478	4397	484	Vijaya	Janata Dal (Secular)	General (Women)
40	Attiguppe	South	Nagarabhavi	25619	1288	231	Gayathri H P	Indian National Congress	General (Women)
41	Gali Anjaneyaswamy Temple	South	Nagarabhavi	51746	2790	512	Lakshminarayana	Indian National Congress	General
42	Bapujinagar	South	Jagajeeevanaram Nagar	43223	3314	481	N Venkataswamy	Indian National Congress	General
43	Padarayanapura	South	Jagajeeevanaram Nagar	59933	4108	447	Zareena Begum	Janata Dal (Secular)	General (Women)
44	Jagajeeevanaram Nagar	South	Jagajeeevanaram Nagar	43892	12594	281	R. Keshvamurthy	Independent	Backward Category A
45	Azadnagar	South	Jagajeeevanaram Nagar	40821	2630	825	Shrinivasamurthy B T	Indian National Congress	General
46	Chamarajapet	West	Chamarajapet	40725	4151	483	Kokila Chandrashekhar	Indian National Congress	General (Women)
47	Dharamarayaswamy Temple	West	Chamarajapet	32938	2036	108	Yasin Taj	Indian National Congress	General (Women)
48	Sudhamanagar	West	Chamarajapet	42919	10099	346	T V Prabhu	Indian National Congress	Backward Category A
49	Kempegowdanagar	South	Basavanagudi	41075	2162	352	Geetha Sadashiva	Bharatiya Janata Party	General (Women)
50	Vishveshwarapuram	South	Basavanagudi	31893	1676	78	P R Ramesh	Indian National Congress	General
51	Basavanagudi	South	Basavanagudi	39484	1002	216	B. S. Sathyanarayana	Bharatiya Janata Party	General
52	Hanumanthanagar	South	Hanumanthanagar	35660	903	296	K Chandrashekhar	Indian National Congress	General
53	Srinagar	South	Hanumanthanagar	62163	654	272	Lalitha Shrinivasagowda	Indian National Congress	Backward Category B (Women)
54	Srinivasnagar	South	Hanumanthanagar	82630	2725	640	Venkateshmurthy	Bharatiya Janata Party	Backward Category A
55	Padmanabhanagar	South	Padmanabhanagar	112407	5371	1041	L Shrinivas	Bharatiya Janata Party	General
56	Ganeshamandira	South	Padmanabhanagar	87307	5438	1084	A H Basavaraju	Bharatiya Janata Party	General
57	J P Nagar	South	Jayanagar	63906	4153	750	S. K. Nataraj	Bharatiya Janata Party	General
58	Jayanagar	South	Jayanagar	40430	2103	198	Somashekhara B	Bharatiya Janata Party	Backward Category A
59	Yadiyuru	South	Jayanagar	34613	1448	134	Venkatesha Reddy H	Indian National Congress	Backward Category B
60	Pattabhiramanagar	South	Jayanagar	39308	4194	119	N Nagaraj	Indian National Congress	Backward Category A
61	Mavalli	South	Hombegowdanagar	39505	4037	191	Udayanashankar	Indian National Congress	General
62	Homegowdanagar	South	Hombegowdanagar	53934	6312	394	D Shyla	Independent	Backward Category B (Women)
63	Lakkasandra	South	Hombegowdanagar	48979	6610	669	S K Venkatesh	Indian National Congress	Backward Category B
64	Gurappanapalya	South	Madiwala	63111	5497	252	Samiulla K S	Indian National Congress	General
65	B T M Layout	South	Madiwala	51545	3195	383	K Devadas	Janata Dal (Secular)	General
66	Madiwala	South	Madiwala	65820	6499	1107	Muniraju M	Indian National Congress	Scheduled Caste
67	Koramangala	East	Koramangala	45929	6816	542	Mohan B	Indian National Congress	General
68	Ejipura	East	Koramangala	40986	5487	520	Ramachandra	Janata Dal (United)	Scheduled Caste
69	Neelasandra	East	Koramangala	52079	6678	2161	B Selvam	Independent	Scheduled Caste
70	Shanthinagar	East	Shanthinagar	34682	4126	668	K Vasudeva Murthy	Janata Dal (United)	General
71	Austin Town	East	Shanthinagar	39790	15542	390	M K Kupparaj	Janata Dal (United)	General
72	Domlur	East	Jeevanabima Nagar	44357	6333	385	Y L Rajalakshmi	Indian National Congress	Backward Category A (Women)
73	HAL Airport	East	Jeevanabima Nagar	42288	8351	239	Reena Janardhana	Indian National Congress	General (Women)
74	Jeevanabima Nagar	East	Jeevanabima Nagar	39820	5431	289	S Munireddy	Janata Dal (United)	Backward Category B
75	Jogupalya	East	Jeevanabima Nagar	36035	6194	611	G M Mangala	Bharatiya Janata Party	Scheduled Tribe (Women)
76	Richmond Town	East	Shanthinagar	36465	4975	126	Jabeen Taj	Independent	Backward Category A (Women)
77	Sampangiramanagar	East	Shivajinagar	32451	1372	296	Nagarathna	Bharatiya Janata Party	Backward Category A (Women)
78	Vasanthanagar	East	Shivajinagar	37028	4639	750	Gunashekhar M K	Indian National Congress	Backward Category A
79	Shivajinagar	East	Shivajinagar	34988	1420	513	Mumtaz Begum	Indian National Congress	General (Women)
80	Bharathinagar	East	Bharathinagar	35681	2189	186	Nazareena Naza Mujeeba	Indian National Congress	General (Women)
81	Halasuru	East	Bharathinagar	39669	6638	871	M Saravana	Indian National Congress	General
82	Hoysalanagar	East	Bharathinagar	33359	10497	210	G Amuda	Indian National Congress	Scheduled Caste (Women)
83	C. V. Raman Nagar	East	Banaswadi	50256	3960	881	Prathima Raghu	Bharatiya Janata Party	General (Women)
84	Benniganahalli	East	Banaswadi	31985	7346	947	Munivenkatappa	Indian National Congress	Scheduled Caste
85	Sarvagnanagar	East	Sarvagnanagar	34943	12221	261	N Indira	Indian National Congress	Scheduled Caste (Women)
86	Maruthisevanagar	East	Sarvagnanagar	39586	8633	109	K B Mohan	Indian National Congress	Scheduled Caste
87	Lingarajapura	East	Sarvagnanagar	56530	7796	413	R Shankar	Indian National Congress	Backward Category A
88	Banaswadi	East	Banaswadi	26103	2678	263	Lokesh Reddy	Independent	General
89	Kacharakanahalli	East	Sarvagnanagar	32889	3009	306	Padmanabha Reddy	Janata Dal (United)	General
90	Sagaypuram	East	Kadugondanahalli	43432	13347	173	Marimuttu	Janata Dal (Secular)	General (Women)
91	Pulikeshinagar	East	Jayamahal	42078	7188	138	Abdul Rakhee Jhakheer	Indian National Congress	Backward Category A
92	Jayamahal	East	Jayamahal	39663	7305	131	Suryakantha Rao	Bharatiya Janata Party	Backward Category A
93	Devarajeevanahalli	East	Jayamahal	51578	8963	102	Rajani	Janata Dal (Secular)	Scheduled Caste (Women)
94	Kadugondanahalli	East	Kadugondanahalli	60896	7928	159	A S M beeda Anwar	Independent	Backward Category A
95	Kaval Byrasandra	East	Kadugondanahalli	84461	13111	391	Ashwathamma	Janata Dal (Secular)	Scheduled Caste (Women)
96	Hebbal	East	Hebbal	74126	7216	1205	C Munikrishna	Bharatiya Janata Party	Scheduled Caste
97	Jayachamrajendra Nagar	East	Jayamahal	38042	2513	236	Syed Jameel Ahamed	Janata Dal (Secular)	General
98	Ganganagar	East	Hebbal	52546	4080	386	Jayalakshmi L A	Indian National Congress	Backward Category A (Women)
99	Aramane nagar	East	Hebbal	32560	3930	265	Rajendra Rao A	Janata Dal (United)	General
100	Sanjayanagar	West	Sanjayanagar	52263	4431	672	M Venkatesh	Janata Dal (Secular)	General

=== Results summary ===
Parties and coalitions	Popular vote			Seats	
Parties and coalitions	Votes	%	±pp	Won	+/−
Indian National Congress (INC)				57	
Bharatiya Janata Party (BJP))				15	
Janata Dal (Secular) (JDS)				13	
Independents (IND)				9	
Janata Dal (United) (JDU)				9	
Total				100	±0
Valid votes					
Invalid votes					
Votes cast / turnout					
Abstentions					
Registered voters					

== See also ==
- List of wards in Bangalore (1995-2006)
- List of wards in Bangalore
- Elections in Karnataka
- Bangalore Mahanagara Palike
