= P. R. Ramesh =

P. R. Ramesh is an Indian politician who served as Mayor of Bangalore and Nominated Member of Karnataka Legislative Council.

== Personal life ==
He was born to P. Rudramurthy in Bangalore. He is married to K. Saraswati and has one son and one daughter.
