= R. Subbanna =

Indian politician

- Born: 21 September 1911; Byrapura
- Died: 9 April 1977 (aged 65)

R. Subbanna (21 September 1911 – 9 April 1977) was the first Mayor of Bangalore city of Karnataka, India.

== Mayor of Bangalore ==
Municipality Corporation in Bangalore was formed in the year 1949. R. Subbanna was the first nominated mayor of Bangalore in the same year 1949. His term lasted for just a year. The first municipal election was conducted in 1950, the next year.

== Background ==
Subbana was a congress volunteer and served the State Congress of Bangalore for 30 years.
