= 1989 Bangalore Mahanagara Palike election =

87 of 87 seats in the Bangalore Mahanagara Palike 44 seats needed for a majority

	Majority party	Minority party	Third party
		JD
Party	Indian National Congress	Janata Party	Bharatiya Janata Party
BCC majority before election
Council dissolved
Elected BMP majority
INC

The 1989 Bangalore Mahanagara Palike (Bangalore City Corporation) election was held in May 1989 for all 87 wards of Bangalore.

== Background ==
In 1989, the BMP expanded to include 87 wards. The tenure of the Bangalore Mahanagara Palike ended in 1988. A new election was necessary to elect new Corporators and Mayor.

=== Organization ===
The New Mayor will be elected for a term of one year and Corporators will be in office for 5 years.

== Schedule ==
The schedule of the election was announced by the State Election Commission in March 1989 and date of counting / announcement of result was in May 1989.

== Results ==
Ward No.	Ward Name	Population (1991)			Elected Corporator (1989 elections)		
Ward No.	Ward Name	Total	SCs	STs	Corporator Name	Party	Reservation category
1	Yeshwantapura	58792	6755	804			
2	Mathikere	60625	6755	753			
3	Malleswara West	24333	1831	66			
4	Kodandaramapura	21880	695	140			
5	Swimming Pool Extension	15806	763	58			
6	Malleswara East	14763	171	55			
7	Dattatreya Temple	24993	3595	382			
8	Mahalakshmipura	70698	9368	858			
9	Subramanya Pura	38852	986	399			
10	Gayathrinagara	19769	716	146			
11	Rajajinagar	85514	4350	784			
12	Prakashnagar	35461	1966	171	G. Padmavathi		
13	Sriramapuram	24382	347	127			
14	Sree Venkateswara Temple Nagar	19965	437	171			
15	Sree Ramamandira	22628	826	129			
16	Industrial Town	46859	5605	706			
17	Bhasyamnagar	27652	6147	118			
18	Sevashram	27397	11156	137			
19	Sheshadripuram	23144	8341	95			
20	Ramachandrapuram	27008	1648	127			
21	Gopalapuram	26758	6688	144			
22	Gandhinagar	19304	1418	95			
23	Cottonpet	27155	2766	407			
24	Kashi Vishweswara Temple	16491	6	0			
25	Chikpet	15570	13	21			
26	Rangaswamy Temple	17657	30	51			
27	Super Talkies	29440	14951	81			
28	Sri Krlshnarajendra Market	16790	1129	182			
29	Govindarajanagar	74592	6803	1327			
30	Vijayanagar	63111	4606	632			
31	Kempapura Agrahara	40726	1346	593			
32	Binnypet	23119	1953	584			
33	Padarayanapura	66467	4742	371			
34	Jagajeevanramnagar	33009	9811	177			
35	Gowripura	19805	2287	151			
36	Gali Anjaneyaswamy Temple	41190	2921	928			
37	Azadnagar	23604	1744	347			
38	Dharmarayaswamy Temple	15325	42	27			
39	Channarayaswamy Temple	16631	2776	18			
40	Raghavendra Nagar	19593	138	270			
41	Chamarajpet	20077	3151	33			
42	Fort	20202	1669	84			
43	Kalasipalyam	16754	4576	142			
44	Sudhamanagar	28537	4892	52			
45	Kempegowda Nagar	23715	2140	192			
46	Shankarapuram	15365	101	79			
47	Visweswarapuram	18029	1194	34			
48	Sreenagara	60318	740	714			
49	Hanumanthanagara	28977	798	310	K. Chandrashekhar	Indian National Congress	General
50	Basavanagudi	29096	905	146	B. S. Sathyanarayana	Bharatiya Janata Party	General
51	Kanakanagara	18559	547	36			
52	Ganesha Mandira	60720	3994	727			
53	Mavalli	15259	362	29			
54	Hombegowdanagar	39996	6024	355			
55	Lakkasandra	45949	5650	259			
56	Patalamma Temple	17860	315	81			
57	Pattabirama Nagar	37530	2920	139			
58	Madivala	51306	5609	452			
59	Yediyur	30483	1165	141			
60	Jayanagar	49374	6313	279			
61	Richmond Town	17608	2039	39			
62	Ashoknagar	20830	5640	58			
63	Jogupalyam	29634	3502	1050			
64	Shanthinagar	30848	4571	147			
65	Austin Town	47967	19273	16			
66	Neelasandra	35000	2271	51			
67	Gowthamapura	41886	8413	405			
68	Commercial Street	20257	873	27			
69	Shivaji nagar	16429	983	58			
70	Tasker Town	18205	1790	49			
71	High Grounds	23349	2335	276			
72	Cobbonpet	15008	2292	76			
73	Sampangiramanagar	19842	1170	78			
74	Maruthisevanagar	34599	6719	122			
75	Cox Town (Sarvajnanagar)	32084	8703	235			
76	Nehrupuram	15135	1532	20			
77	Bharatinagar	18002	2085	19			
78	Shivanchetty Garden	18055	1458	91			
79	Ulsoor	14279	1564	144			
80	Murphy Town	42947	17437	212			
81	Jayachamarajendra Nagar	38358	3144	134			
82	Sadashivanagar	50412	2679	279			
83	Jayamahal	36313	5676	101			
84	Frazer Town	19212	4462	69			
85	Sagayapuram	39748	13565	47			
86	Palace Guttahalli	20971	2408	125			
87	St. John's Hill	18146	1564	55			

== See also ==
- List of wards in Bangalore (1989-1995)
- List of wards in Bangalore (1995-2006)
- List of wards in Bangalore
- Elections in Karnataka
- Bangalore Mahanagara Palike
