= Suryanarayana =

Suryanarayan, Suryanarayana or Surya Narayana is the name of Hindu Sun God Surya. It is also a common Indian name.

- Bayya Suryanarayana Murthy, Parliamentarian and leader of the Dalit movement
- Kommareddi Suryanarayana, Indian Parliamentarian.
- Lingam Suryanarayana, Surgeon from Andhra Pradesh, India.
- Missula Suryanarayana Murti Indian politician and Member of Parliament.
- Ravula Suryanarayana Murty Indian poet and writer.
- Vyricherla Kishore Chandra Suryanarayana Deo Indian politician and a member of the Indian National Congress.
- Yadavalli Suryanarayana Theater and cinema actor.
- Suryanarayana (Bajrang Dal), a leader of the Bajrang Dal, an Indian militant Hindutva organisation.
- Suryanarayana Temple, Arasavalli, a temple dedicated to suryanarayana (sun god) in Arasavalli, Srikakulam District, Andhra Pradesh, India
