= List of wards in Bangalore (1989–1995) =

In 1989, the then Bangalore Mahanagara Palike (BMP) expanded to include 87 wards. Here is the list of wards.

Ward No.	Ward Name	Number of Households (1991)			Total Population (1991)			SC Population (1991)			ST Population (1991)			Elected Corporator (1989 elections)		
Ward No.	Ward Name	Total	Occupied	Vacant	Total	Male	Female	Total	Male	Female	Total	Male	Female	Corporator Name	Party	Reservation category
1	Yeshwantapura	12101	12047	54	31211	27581	58792	3475	3280	6755	413	391	804			
2	Mathikere	13057	12894	163	32501	28124	60625	3460	3295	6755	392	361	753			
3	Malleswara West	5146	5132	14	12308	12025	24333	908	923	1831	36	30	66			
4	Kodandaramapura	4556	4545	11	11419	10461	21880	369	326	695	66	74	140			
5	Swimming Pool Extension	3337	3336	1	8073	7733	15806	404	359	763	31	27	58			
6	Malleswara East	3269	3260	9	7756	7007	14763	93	78	171	28	27	55			
7	Dattatreya Temple	5137	5134	3	13104	11889	24993	1881	1714	3595	195	187	382			
8	Mahalakshmipura	14966	14872	94	37252	33446	70698	4839	4529	9368	443	415	858			
9	Subramanya Pura	8447	8440	7	20089	18763	38852	518	468	986	202	197	399			
10	Gayathrinagara	4020	4017	3	10368	9401	19769	367	349	716	66	80	146			
11	Rajajinagar	17893	17889	4	44894	40620	85514	2275	2075	4350	404	380	784			
12	Prakashnagar	7282	7277	5	18446	17015	35461	1028	938	1966	89	82	171	G. Padmavathi		
13	Sriramapuram	5018	5011	7	12575	11807	24382	175	172	347	62	65	127			
14	Sree Venkateswara Temple Nagar	4086	4076	10	10424	9541	19965	218	219	437	82	89	171			
15	Sree Ramamandira	4498	4486	12	11646	10982	22628	418	408	826	72	57	129			
16	Industrial Town	9712	9671	41	24993	21866	46859	2965	2640	5605	387	319	706			
17	Bhasyamnagar	5191	5184	7	14400	13252	27652	3239	2908	6147	59	59	118			
18	Sevashram	5194	5187	7	14022	13375	27397	5744	5412	11156	67	70	137			
19	Sheshadripuram	4380	4371	9	12038	11106	23144	4316	4025	8341	53	42	95			
20	Ramachandrapuram	5201	5186	15	13980	13028	27008	863	785	1648	61	66	127			
21	Gopalapuram	4819	4809	10	14019	12739	26758	3465	3223	6688	76	68	144			
22	Gandhinagar	3119	2972	147	11408	7896	19304	756	662	1418	55	40	95			
23	Cottonpet	5178	5178	0	14104	13051	27155	1429	1337	2766	217	190	407			
24	Kashi Vishweswara Temple	2671	2588	83	8786	7705	16491	3	3	6	0	0	0			
25	Chikpet	2429	2365	64	8262	7308	15570	8	5	13	13	8	21			
26	Rangaswamy Temple	2990	2939	51	9362	8295	17657	22	8	30	25	26	51			
27	Super Talkies	4872	4866	6	15044	14396	29440	7569	7382	14951	39	42	81			
28	Sri Krlshnarajendra Market	3357	2415	942	9336	7454	16790	701	428	1129	92	90	182			
29	Govindarajanagar	15558	15541	17	39304	35288	74592	3578	3225	6803	710	617	1327			
30	Vijayanagar	12952	12917	35	33204	29907	63111	2474	2132	4606	333	299	632			
31	Kempapura Agrahara	8143	8134	9	21198	19528	40726	701	645	1346	310	283	593			
32	Binnypet	4264	4256	8	12047	11072	23119	1023	930	1953	302	282	584			
33	Padarayanapura	11619	11616	3	34769	31698	66467	2519	2223	4742	193	178	371			
34	Jagajeevanramnagar	5469	5464	5	17041	15968	33009	5064	4747	9811	93	84	177			
35	Gowripura	3280	3280	0	10420	9385	19805	1204	1083	2287	87	64	151			
36	Gali Anjaneyaswamy Temple	8273	8267	6	21791	19399	41190	1553	1368	2921	466	462	928			
37	Azadnagar	4539	4538	1	12352	11252	23604	904	840	1744	184	163	347			
38	Dharmarayaswamy Temple	2532	2502	30	8055	7270	15325	22	20	42	17	10	27			
39	Channarayaswamy Temple	2792	2725	67	8920	7711	16631	1448	1328	2776	7	11	18			
40	Raghavendra Nagar	3883	3876	7	10168	9425	19593	72	66	138	148	122	270			
41	Chamarajpet	3318	3297	21	10454	9623	20077	1635	1516	3151	17	16	33			
42	Fort	3437	3090	347	11028	9174	20202	956	713	1669	39	45	84			
43	Kalasipalyam	3015	2535	480	9218	7536	16754	2408	2168	4576	79	63	142			
44	Sudhamanagar	4946	4888	58	14925	13612	28537	2501	2391	4892	28	24	52			
45	Kempegowda Nagar	4960	4935	25	12294	11421	23715	1067	1073	2140	88	104	192			
46	Shankarapuram	3133	3069	64	8043	7322	15365	61	40	101	45	34	79			
47	Visweswarapuram	3145	3131	14	9450	8579	18029	609	585	1194	19	15	34			
48	Sreenagara	12839	12824	15	31653	28665	60318	415	325	740	380	334	714			
49	Hanumanthanagara	6193	6193	0	15334	13643	28977	416	382	798	164	146	310			
50	Basavanagudi	6170	6160	10	14996	14100	29096	466	439	905	79	67	146	B. S. Sathyanarayana	Bharatiya Janata Party	General
51	Kanakanagara	3338	3313	25	9411	9148	18559	267	280	547	16	20	36			
52	Ganesha Mandira	12811	12801	10	31382	29338	60720	2011	1983	3994	352	375	727			
53	Mavalli	2831	2811	20	7818	7441	15259	194	168	362	19	10	29			
54	Hombegowdanagar	7664	7663	1	20627	19369	39996	3073	2951	6024	179	176	355			
55	Lakkasandra	8883	8867	16	24152	21797	45949	2965	2685	5650	143	116	259			
56	Patalamma Temple	3579	3577	2	9332	8528	17860	158	157	315	46	35	81			
57	Pattabirama Nagar	7358	7358	0	19210	18320	37530	1541	1379	2920	77	62	139			
58	Madivala	10097	10095	2	26955	24351	51306	2854	2755	5609	241	211	452			
59	Yediyur	6090	6066	24	15451	15032	30483	527	638	1165	73	68	141			
60	Jayanagar	9863	9854	9	25319	24055	49374	3240	3073	6313	139	140	279			
61	Richmond Town	3207	3172	35	9300	8308	17608	1349	690	2039	32	7	39			
62	Ashoknagar	3621	3587	34	10402	10428	20830	2836	2804	5640	31	27	58			
63	Jogupalyam	5929	5881	48	15580	14054	29634	1781	1721	3502	545	505	1050			
64	Shanthinagar	5650	5636	14	15907	14941	30848	2293	2278	4571	75	72	147			
65	Austin Town	8689	8678	11	26051	21916	47967	9774	9499	19273	8	8	16			
66	Neelasandra	6514	6502	12	17940	17060	35000	1146	1125	2271	23	28	51			
67	Gowthamapura	8791	8784	7	21470	20416	41886	4250	4163	8413	204	201	405			
68	Commercial Street	3149	3073	76	11375	8882	20257	477	396	873	13	14	27			
69	Shivaji nagar	2453	2420	33	8470	7959	16429	502	481	983	35	23	58			
70	Tasker Town	3121	2885	236	9290	8915	18205	903	887	1790	24	25	49			
71	High Grounds	4506	4499	7	12027	11322	23349	1192	1143	2335	140	136	276			
72	Cobbonpet	2528	2472	56	7630	7378	15008	1272	1020	2292	48	28	76			
73	Sampangiramanagar	3795	3774	21	10310	9532	19842	607	563	1170	38	40	78			
74	Maruthisevanagar	6673	6656	17	17242	17357	34599	3369	3350	6719	54	68	122			
75	Cox Town (Sarvajnanagar)	5907	5896	11	18963	13121	32084	4427	4276	8703	124	111	235			
76	Nehrupuram	2348	2343	5	7686	7449	15135	756	776	1532	14	6	20			
77	Bharatinagar	3140	3126	14	9161	8841	18002	1057	1028	2085	11	8	19			
78	Shivanchetty Garden	3578	3551	27	9216	8839	18055	731	727	1458	46	45	91			
79	Ulsoor	2893	2831	62	7269	7010	14279	799	765	1564	78	66	144			
80	Murphy Town	8479	8436	43	22015	20932	42947	8878	8559	17437	102	110	212			
81	Jayachamarajendra Nagar	7035	7010	25	19615	18743	38358	1561	1583	3144	73	61	134			
82	Sadashivanagar	10284	10265	19	26151	24261	50412	1398	1281	2679	148	131	279			
83	Jayamahal	6891	6891	0	19227	17086	36313	2889	2787	5676	55	46	101			
84	Frazer Town	3368	3336	32	9747	9465	19212	2266	2196	4462	34	35	69			
85	Sagayapuram	6512	6492	20	20161	19587	39748	6896	6669	13565	26	21	47			
86	Palace Guttahalli	3904	3896	8	10740	10231	20971	1232	1176	2408	63	62	125			
87	St. John's Hill	3273	3243	30	8950	9196	18146	776	788	1564	29	26	55			

== See also ==
- 1989 Bangalore Municipal Corporation election
- List of wards in Bangalore (1995-2006)
- List of wards in Bangalore
