= D. Venkatesh Murthy =

Indian politician

46th Mayor of Bangalore
- In office 2011–2012
- Deputy: L. Srinivas
- Preceded by: Sharadamma Ramanjaneya
- Succeeded by: B S Sathyanarayana

Personal details
- Party: Bharatiya Janta Party
- Spouse: K. Prabha

D Venkatesh Murthy is a social worker and former BJP politician who served as 46th Mayor of Bangalore.

== Career ==
He was three time corporator of K. S. Eshwarappa. He was suspended from Bharatiya Janata Party in 2017. He is the longest serving Mayor of Bangalore.
