= R. Sampath Raj =

Indian politician

51st Mayor of Bangalore
- In office 28 September 2017 – 28 September 2018
- Preceded by: G. Padmavathi
- Succeeded by: Gangambike Mallikarjun
- Constituency: D. J. Halli

Personal details
- Born: 19 September 1969 (age 57) Bangalore, Mysore State, India
- Party: Indian National Congress

R. Sampath Raj is an Indian National Congress political activist and the former mayor of Bengaluru city. He assumed office on 28 September 2017 and is a corporator from D. J. Halli ward.

He contested the 2018 Karnataka Legislative Assembly elections from C. V. Raman Nagar assembly constituency and was defeated by S. Raghu of BJP.
