= M Goutham Kumar =

Indian politician

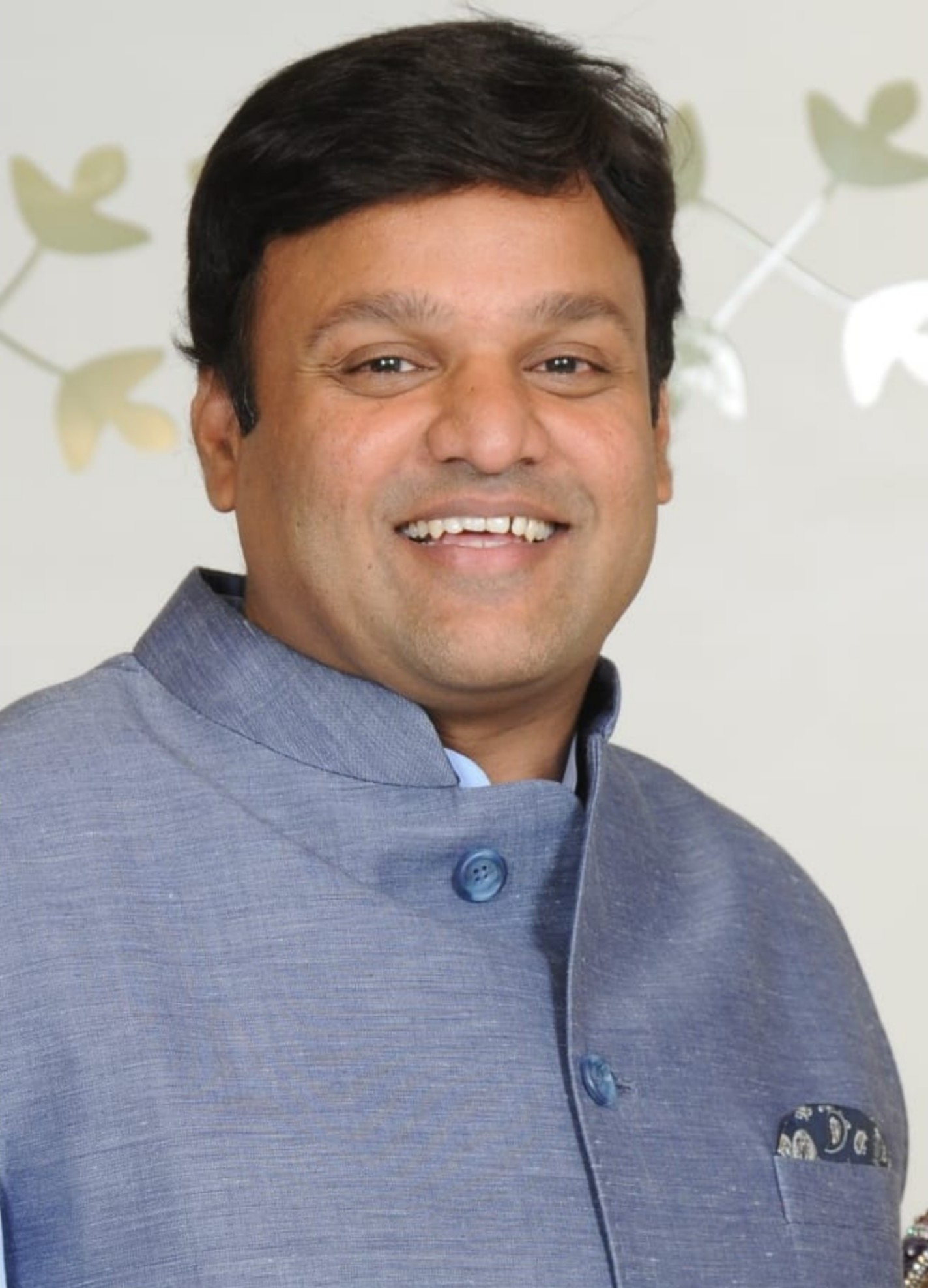

53rd Mayor of Bengaluru
- In office 1 October 2019 – 10 September 2020
- Preceded by: Gangambike Mallikarjun
- Constituency: Jogupalya

BJP Secretary
- In office 2007 – 2008
- Constituency: Shanti Nagar Assembly constituency

Treasurer, BJP State Yuva Morcha
- In office 2010 – 2016
- Constituency: Karnataka

BBMP Corporator
- In office 2010 – 2020
- Constituency: Jougupalya Ward, Shanti Nagar Assembly constituency

BJP Secretary
- In office 2016 – 2017
- Constituency: Bengaluru

BBMP Accounts Committee Chairman
- In office 2013 – 2014
- Constituency: Bengaluru

BJP Treasurer
- In office 2021 – 2024
- Constituency: Bangalore Central Lok Sabha constituency

BJP General Secretary
- Incumbent
- Assumed office 2024
- Constituency: Bangalore Central Lok Sabha constituency

Personal details
- Born: 30 October 1976 (age 49) Siruguppa, Karnataka, India
- Party: Bhartiya Janata Party
- Spouse: Rekha Jain
- Children: Harsh Jain; Tanisha Jain
- Education: B.Com
- Website: Official Website

M Goutham Kumar (Kannada: ಮೀ ಗೌತಮ್ ಕುಮಾರ್) is an Indian politician who was the 53rd and the last Mayor of Bengaluru in the then unified Bruhat Bengaluru Mahanagara Palike). He is currently the Lok Sabha Convenor for BJP, Bangalore Central Lok Sabha constituency. He was elected from Jogupalya Ward, belonging to Shanti Nagar Assembly constituency from Bharatiya Janata Party. He was elected as Mayor on 1 October 2019. While Kumar secured 129 votes, R Satyanarayana from the Congress got 110 votes. He is also currently the General Secretary of Bharatiya Janata Party, Bangalore Central Lok Sabha constituency

He had earlier held various posts under BJP's City Unit. He was the Secretary of BJP's Shantinagar Unit for 4 years. He was also the City Secretary of BJP Bengaluru, and in 2013–14 the BBMP Accounts Committee Chairman.

== Personal life ==
M Goutham Kumar is a member of the Jain community which hails from Siruguppa in Ballari district.

== Works and contributions ==
M Goutham Kumar has given a lot of approvals for the house plans through BBMP after the officials have inspected the site and decided to approve it. He also favoured the extension of the mayor’s term from the existing one year to 2.5 years. He also focussed on banning certain types of plastic and tackling the garbage problem.
