= Manjunath Reddy =

Indian politician

B.N.Manjunatha Reddy

49th Mayor of Bangalore
- Preceded by: N. Shanthakumari
- Succeeded by: G. Padmavathi
- Constituency: BTM Layout

Personal details
- Born: 22 September 1962 (age 64)
- Party: Indian National Congress

B. N. Manjunatha Reddy was the 49th Mayor of Bengaluru. He was elected from Madiwala ward belonging to BTM layout assembly constituency from Indian National Congress party. He got elected as Mayor on 11 September 2015.

== Early life and family ==
Born on 22 September 1962 to a farmer family, Mr Reddy was brought up in Bommanahalli at Bengaluru, Karnataka as the third son to Late Sri. Narayana Reddy and Smt Lakshmamma. Manjunatha Reddy moved to Madiwala in his early teenage for his education and holds a bachelor's degree in arts.
