= Kaivara =

Town in Karnataka, India

Coordinates: 13°21′N 77°59′E

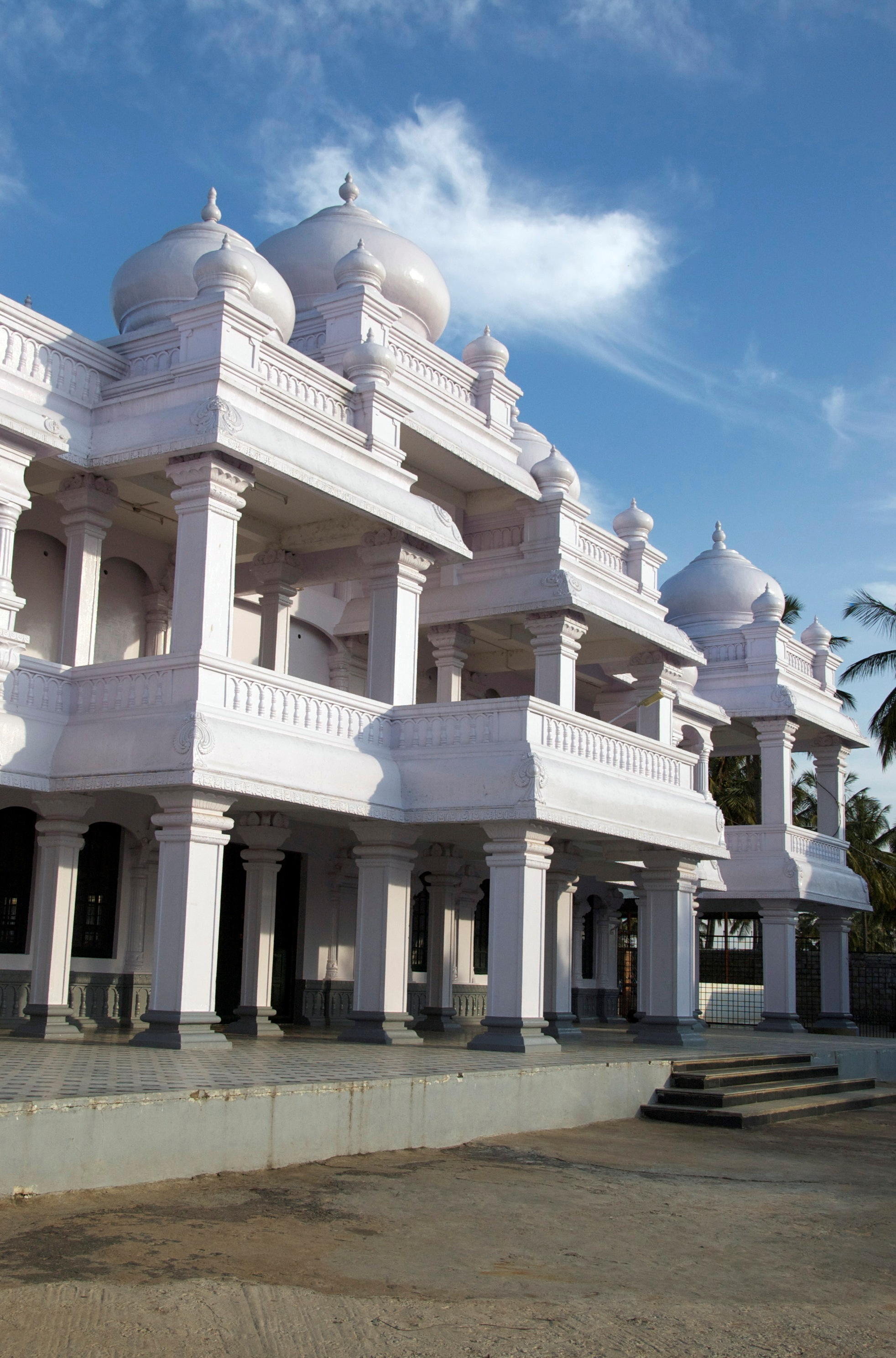
The Sri Yogi Nareyana mutt in Kaiwara

Kaiwara is a small town in the Chikkaballapura district of Karnataka state, located approximately 65 km northeast of the state capital Bangalore.

In 1984, the 56th Kannada Sahithya Sammelana was organised in Kaivara, under the presidency of A. N. Murthy Rao.

== Demographics ==
As of the 2001 Indian census, Kaiwara's population was 5,488, of which 2,792 were male and 2,696 female.

== Saint Narayanappa ==
The poet Saint Narayanappa (1730-1840 AD), also known as Yogi Nareyana, as Kaiwara Narayana Thatha (ನಾರಾಯಣ ತಾತ) in Kannada and as Narayana Thathayya in Telugu, meditated in a cave in Kaiwara. Narayanappa prophesied and composed poems in praise of Amara Narayanaswamy, an incarnation of Vishnu, in both Kannada and Telugu. His works include "Amaranarayana Shathaka", "Kaalagnana", and "Bramanandpuri Shatakka", which describes nuances of yoga.
