= Gangambike Mallikarjun =

Indian politician

52nd Mayor of Bangalore
- In office 28 September 2018 – 28 September 2019
- Preceded by: R. Sampath Raj
- Succeeded by: M Goutham Kumar

Personal details
- Born: 11 November 1978 (age 47)
- Party: Indian National Congress

Gangambike Mallikarjun was the 52nd mayor of Bangalore (Bruhat Bangalore Mahanagara Palike). She was the eighth female mayor of the city and she was elected in September 2018. In this election, she contested from the Jayanagar ward.

== Personal life ==
Gangambike Mallikarjun was born on 11 November 1978 She pursued a bachelor's degree in commerce (B. Com). She is married to B Mallikarjun, who is an engineer by profession. The couple have two children, one son (Prajwal) and a daughter (Nandini).
