= Srimushnam Srinivasa Murthy =

- Born: 19 May 1923
- Died: 24 November 2009 (aged 86)
- Occupation: writer

Srimushnam Srinivasa Murthy (19 May 1923 – 24 November 2009) was a Gandhian Freedom Fighter and a Kannada writer based in Bangalore. He was born on 19 May 1923 in Mysore to Srimushnam Rangacharya and Kaveri Bai. He has written many books in kannada, one of them being Vedanta Samanvaya, which is a synthesis of the classic interpretations of Upanishads and Brahma Sutras by Ramanuja, Madhvacharya and Shankaracharya. He was an employee of Hindustan Aeronautics Limited.He also served as General Secretary of the Hindustan Aircraft Employees' Association.

== Works ==
- Devaru (A book written in reply to A. N. Murthy Rao's Devaru)
- Geeta Samanvaya
- Vedanta Samanvaya

== See also ==
- A.N. Murthy Rao
- Upanishads
- Dvaita
- Advaita
- Vishishtadvaita
