= Palanki Venkata Ramachandra Murthi =

Palanki Venkata Ramachandra Murthi (1909–2005) was an Indian Telugu-language author of children's stories and books.

Palanki Venkata Ramachandra Murthi was born in 1909 in Ravikampaadu village in East Godavari district, a part of the then Madras State in South India. He had his early education in Kakinada and later in Madras city (now known as Chennai). After securing a degree from the Presidency College, he joined the Madras Central Cooperative Land Mortgage Bank. Writing was his favourite hobby. He wrote thousands of stories for children. These appeared regularly in Bala and Chandamama, magazines for children, published from Chennai. He also wrote several novels for children. In addition to children's literature, he was a prolific writer of stories for older persons as well. Some of these were published as compilations Katha Saagaram. He wrote Jeevana Sravanthi, an autobiographical account. He was a regular contributor to Soubhagya, Andhra Patrika, Andhra Prabha, Yuva, Jyothi and several other weekly and monthly magazines of the time.

== Life ==
He was gifted with a sense of humour and satire. He chose appropriate words in the most economical fashion in all is stories and novels. He felt that every writer should have two qualities in order to be a good writer - extensive reading habit and excellent command over the language. He believed that his work should not only entertain the reader, but also educate him. In his stories for children, he used synonyms so that the vocabulary of the reader got expanded without the pain of learning. His most popular novels for children include "Bangaru Thalli" set in Alexander's conquest in India and Chiru Kappa, a child brought up by wild animals in the jungle. He presented hundreds of radio talks at All India Radio, Madras till 1956. When the State of Andhra Pradesh was created in 1956, at the beginning of the reorganisation of states of India on linguistic bases, he moved to Hyderabad, along with his Office, which was now christened Andhra Pradesh Central Cooperative Land Mortgage Bank as its accountant. The bank later merged with the Andhra Pradesh State Cooperative Land Mortgage Bank, Hyderabad. He was a very sincere employee and brought home ledgers and files from the office and attended to them during the night. The bank was subsequently merged with the Andhra Pradesh State Cooperative Bank. He was closely associated with the poet, writer and lyricist Devulapalli Venkata Krishna Sastry who was with All India Radio Madras, Kalyan Singh, the editor of "Sowbhagya", Nyayapati Raghava Rao (known as Bala Annayya) and Nyayapati Kameswari (known as "Bala Akkayya"), Ayyagari Veerabhadra Rao, Station Director, All India Radio, Munkimanikyam Narasimha Rao, Palagummi Vishwanatham, Chitta Ranjan and Balantharapu Rajani Kantha Rao. He was honoured by the then Governor of Andhra Pradesh with the title "Bala Bandhu", meaning "Well wishing relative of children". His wife Palanki Surya Prakasamma was a keen participant in Mahila Mandali (Women's wing) of All India Radio and assisted the social reformer Durgabai Deshmukh. Their marriage was a child marriage. Murthi was eight years old and Prakasamma was four years old when they were married. He had four daughters and three sons. He died at the age of 96 in the year 2005 in Hyderabad.

He writings include books on Acharyatrayam - Sankaracharya, Madhvacharya and Ramanujacharya. Even though a Hindu by birth, he believed in the universality of all religions. He studied the Bible in depth and offered interpretations in an easily understandable manner. He has written several radio dramas on biblical themes and these were broadcast by Amruthavani radio station. Balala bommala Bharatam (see link below), Ramayanam and Panchatantram were also penned by him
