= Murty Kennedy =

Irish hurler

Martin "Murty" Kennedy
Personal information
- Native name: Máirtín Ó Cinnéide (Irish)
- Nickname: Murty
- Born: 1956 (age 69–70) Freshford, County Kilkenny, Ireland
- Occupation: Funeral director
- Height: 5 ft 10 in (178 cm)

Sport
- Sport: Hurling
- Position: Midfield
Club
- Years: Club
- St Lachtain's
Club titles
- Kilkenny titles: 0
Inter-county*
Years	County	Apps (scores)
1978–1980	Kilkenny	6 (1-02)
Inter-county titles
- Leinster titles: 1
- All-Irelands: 1
- NHL: 0
- All Stars: 0
- *Inter County team apps and scores correct as of 11:27, 18 June 2015.

Martin "Murty" Kennedy (born 1956) is an Irish former hurler who played as a midfielder for the Kilkenny senior team.

Born in Freshford, County Kilkenny, Kennedy first played competitive hurling during his schooling at Johnstown Vocational School. He arrived on the inter-county scene at the age of sixteen when he first linked up with the Kilkenny minor team before later joining the under-21 side. He made his senior debut during the 1978 championship. Kennedy subsequently became a regular member of the team and won one Leinster medal.

At club level Kennedy is a one-time championship medallist in the intermediate grade with St Lachtain's.

Throughout his career Kennedy made 6 championship appearances. His retirement came following the conclusion of the 1980 championship.

In retirement from playing Kennedy became involved in team management and coaching. He was a selector with the Kilkenny under-21 team that won the All-Ireland title in 1999.

== Honours ==
=== Player ===
Kilkenny Schools

- All-Ireland Vocational Schools Championship (2): 1972, 1973

St Lachtain's

- Kilkenny Intermediate Hurling Championship (1): 1984

Kilkenny

- All-Ireland Senior Hurling Championship (1): 1979 (sub)
- Leinster Senior Hurling Championship (2): 1978, 1979 (sub)
- All-Ireland Under-21 Hurling Championship (1): 1977
- Leinster Under-21 Hurling Championship (2): 1976, 1977
- All-Ireland Minor Hurling Championship (1): 1973
- Leinster Minor Hurling Championship (2): 1973, 1974

=== Selector ===
Kilkenny

- All-Ireland Under-21 Hurling Championship (1): 1999
- Leinster Under-21 Hurling Championship (1): 1999
