= N. Shanthakumari =

Indian politician

Mayor of Bangalore
- In office September 2014 – September 2015
- Preceded by: B. S. Satyanarayana
- Succeeded by: B. N. Manjunath Reddy
- Majority: Moodalapalya ward

N. Shanthakumari was the 48th Mayor of Bangalore (Bruhat Bangalore Mahanagara Palike). She was also the sixth woman mayor of the city. She became a mayor in September 2014.

== Career ==
In 2014 Shanthakumari contested in the Bruhat Bangalore Mahanagara Palike (BBMP) election as a candidate of Bharatiya Janata Party (BJP) representing Moodalapalya ward. After winning in the election she became a mayor of the city and K. Ranganna became the deputy mayor. Her term ended in 2015. Before becoming a mayor, she served as a councillor for three times. She also served as a deputy mayor in 2004-05 and had been a member of a number of various civic body standing committees.
