= Niren Murthy =

- Education: Ph.D
- Occupation(s): Co-founder, professor, and scientific advisor
- Website: https://murthylab.berkeley.edu

Niren Murthy is a professor of bioengineering at the University of California, Berkeley. His laboratory is focused on the development of new materials for drug delivery and molecular imaging.

== Career ==
Murthy began his career at Georgia Tech in 2003 and moved to U.C. Berkeley in 2012. He did postdoctoral research in the Chemistry department at U.C. Berkeley from 2001-2003 and received a Ph.D. in Bioengineering from the University of Washington, Seattle in 2001. He was an assistant professor at Georgia Institute of Technology, in Biomedical Engineering from 2003-2012.

Murthy is a co-founder and scientific advisor for Genedit Inc., the inventor of CRISPR-Gold and the scientific co-founder of Microbial Medical. In addition, BioAmp Diagnostics originated from technology developed in the Murthy laboratory. Dr. Murthy was a recipient of the NSF Career award in 2006 and won the Society for Biomaterials Young Investigator award in 2009.

== Laboratory ==
Murthy’s laboratory focuses on the development of molecular imaging and materials for drug delivery. The laboratory has developed new biomaterials and imaging agents, which are designed to improve the diagnosis and treatment of infectious diseases. Murthy laboratory has also developed reagents for detecting radical oxidants, like the hydrocyanines.

The Murthy laboratory has been recently focussed on developing gene editing delivery vehicles and developed CRISPR-Gold in 2017, which was a delivery vehicle that could induce homology-directed DNA repair.

Several new biomaterials and start-up companies have originated from the Murthy laboratory. The hydrocyanines were developed in the Murthy lab in 2009, and are now one of the most commonly used classes of ROS imaging probes. Hydrocyanines were licensed by Life Technologies and LI-COR Biosciences, and are sold under the trade-names Cell-Rox and ROSSTAR.
