= Sharadamma Ramanjaneya =

Indian politician

45th Mayor of Bangalore
- In office 2011–2012
- Preceded by: S. K. Nataraj
- Succeeded by: D. Venkatesh Murthy
- Constituency: Shettihalli

Personal details
- Spouse: Ramanjaneya
- Children: 3

Sharadamma Ramanjaneya was the 45th Mayor of Bangalore (Bruhat Bangalore Mahanagara Palike). She was also the fifth woman mayor of the city. She became a mayor in 2011.

== Career ==
In 2011, Sharadamma contested in the Bruhat Bangalore Mahanagara Palike (BBMP) election as a candidate of Bharatiya Janata Party (BJP) from Shettihalli. After winning in the election she became a mayor of the city and S Harish became the deputy mayor. Her term ended in 2012.
