= Dakshinamurthy (disambiguation) =

== People ==
- Dakshinamurthy Pillai (1875–1936), Carnatic musician
- A. Dakshinamurthy, Tamil scholar
- V. Dakshinamoorthy (1919–2013), veteran Carnatic musician and South Indian music director
- Sonti Dakshinamurthy (1899–1975), famous professor of Medicine

== Hinduism ==
- Dakshinamurti, a form of Shiva
