= Krishnamurthy Rajagopalan =

Indian cricketer (born 1967)

Personal information
- Full name: Krishnamurthy Rajagopalan Iyer
- Born: 1 January 1967 (age 59); Bilaspur, Chhattisgarh
- Batting: Right-handed
- Role: Wicket-keeper

Domestic team information
- Years: Team
- 1991-2000: Madhya Pradesh
- Source: ESPNcricinfo, 24 April 2016

Krishnamurthy Rajagopalan Iyer (born 2 January 1967) is an Indian cricketer who plays for Madhya Pradesh. He made his first-class debut in the 1991–92 Ranji Trophy. He is a right-handed wicket-keeper batsman who was born at Bilaspur, Chhattisgarh.
