= Jalakantapuram Ramaswamy Krishnamoorthy =

Indian doctor

Jalakantapuram Ramaswamy Krishnamoorthy (J. R. Krishnamoorthy) is a doctor from India.

Krishnamoorthy was awarded a Padma Shri in 2010 for his contributions to the field of medicine and his lifetime contributions to society as a medical practitioner in rural India. He has been practicing in Kunrathur, 30 km off Chennai, since the early 1950s and continues to do so at the age of 81.
