= Subramanian Krishnamoorthy =

- Born: 1929; Pudukkottai, India
- Died: 7 September 2014 (aged 84–85); Chennai, Tamil Nadu
- Education: M.A in English literature
- Alma mater: University of Madras, Nagpur University
- Writing career
- Language: Tamil
- Notable awards: Sahitya Akademi; 1991 Translation

S. Krishnamoorthy or S. Krishnamurthy (Subramanian Krishnamoorthy, 1929 – 7 September 2014) has been writing short stories and articles in English and Tamil for over four decades. He was also the winner of prestigious Sahitya Akademi prize for translation.

== Life ==
He was born on 1929 in Pudukkotttai, Tamil Nadu. He obtained his B.A. from "H.H. The Raja’s college", Pudukkottai,(under University of Madras) securing the first rank in the university in Sanskrit. He then obtained his M.A. in English literature from Nagpur University. His mother-tongue is Tamil. He also knows Hindi, Bengali, English, Sanskrit, and German. He taught at a college for a few years. Then he joined the audit department of the Government of India at Madras in 1954. In 1955 he was transferred to Kolkata, where he has been living ever since, except for a 3-year spell in Delhi. He retired from the Indian Audits and Accounts Service in 1987.. He died in Chennai on 7 September 2014 due to illness.

== Literary contributions ==
He has written Tamil short story collections namely "Nandriku oru vilai" & "Manitham" and two English short story collections namely "The Peasant and other stories" & "Modern Aesop Fables". Comprehensive Tamil biographies of Kazi Nazrul Islam, Sarat Chandra Chattopadhyay, Premchand & Iswar Chandra Vidyasagar have also been penned by him.

== Awards ==
His Nazrul biography was awarded the Ilakkia Chintanai Prize (Madras) and the Rabindra Smirti Puraskar of the government of Bengal. The biographies of Premchand and Vidyasagar also won him the Ilakkia Chintanai Prize. He has translated more than 60 books from Bengali, Hindi, English into Tamil and from Tamil to Bengali."Rakta Bonya", his Bengali translation of Indra Partharathi's Tamil novel 'Kurudippunal', has been awarded the Sahitya Akademi translation Prize. & Nikil Bengal Sahitya Samelana Prize..He has translated Tirukural & Silappatikaram in Bengali, which are the most important work of his career. He is closely associated with Bharathi Tamil sangam, Kolkata.
