= Murthi Nayanar =

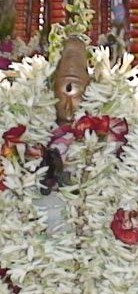

Personal life
- Born: Madurai
- Honors: Nayanar saint,

Religious life
- Religion: Hinduism
- Philosophy: Shaivism, Bhakti

Murthi Nayanar, also spelt as Murthy Nayanar, Moorthy Nayanar and Murti Nayanar and also known as Murtti, is a Nayanar saint, venerated in the Hindu sect of Shaivism. He is generally counted as the fifteenth in the list of 63 Nayanars.

== Life ==
The life of Murthi Nayanar is described in the Periya Puranam by Sekkizhar (12th century), which is a hagiography of the 63 Nayanars. Murthi Nayanar was born in Madurai, the capital of the Pandyan Kingdom. Madurai is famous for Meenakshi Amman Temple, dedicated to the god Shiva and his consort Meenakshi. Madurai is currently part of the Indian state of Tamil Nadu. Murthi Nayanar was a Vaishya, the merchant caste. He was a merchant by profession. He was a great devotee of Shiva, the patron god of Shaivism. The merchant used to serve Shiva by offering fragrant sandalwood paste to anoint the icon of Shiva in the temple. A jain ruler defeated the Pandyas and captured the kingdom. He persecuted the Shaivas and attempted to forcibly convert them to Jainism. However, Murthi Nayanar remained untouched by the mayhem and continued offering sandalwood paste to Shiva in the temple.

In order to forcibly convert Murthi, the Jain king blocked the supply of sandalwood to the capital so that Murthi's service is interrupted. However, Murthi used his elbow instead of sandalwood and started grinding it on stone to make a paste for anointing Shiva. His skin peeled and his bones started showing and blood bled. Pleased by his devotion, Shiva appeared before him and blessed him. Shiva assured him that the tyrant king would die soon and Murthi would replace him as king. As prophesied, the king died the next day, without an heir.

The ministers sent an elephant with a garland to choose the next king, in accordance to tradition. The blindfolded elephant roamed the city and finally reached the temple. Meanwhile, Murthi who did not long for kingship, accepted his fate as a divine order. He came outside the temple, when the elephant saluted him and garlanded the saint. The elephant then uplifted Murthi and placed him on its back and returned to the palace. The ministers pleaded Murthi to be the king. Murthi agreed on the condition that the kingdom accepts Shaivism as its way of life. Murthi ruled in a garb of a Shaiva devotee, smearing his body with sacred ash and wearing rudraksha ornaments and matted hair, instead of a crown. He forwent the luxuries of the crown and ruled the kingdom justly and aimed at the spread of Shaivism. He reached the abode of Shiva, after his death.

Vidya Dehejia feels that his historicity is questionable, but probable. The invaders are interpreted as the Jain Kalabhras, who conquered Madurai. The Periya Puranam borrows descriptions from the inscriptions of the conquest of king Kharavela (193 BCE – after 170 BCE) of Kalinga over the Pandya king.

== Remembrance ==
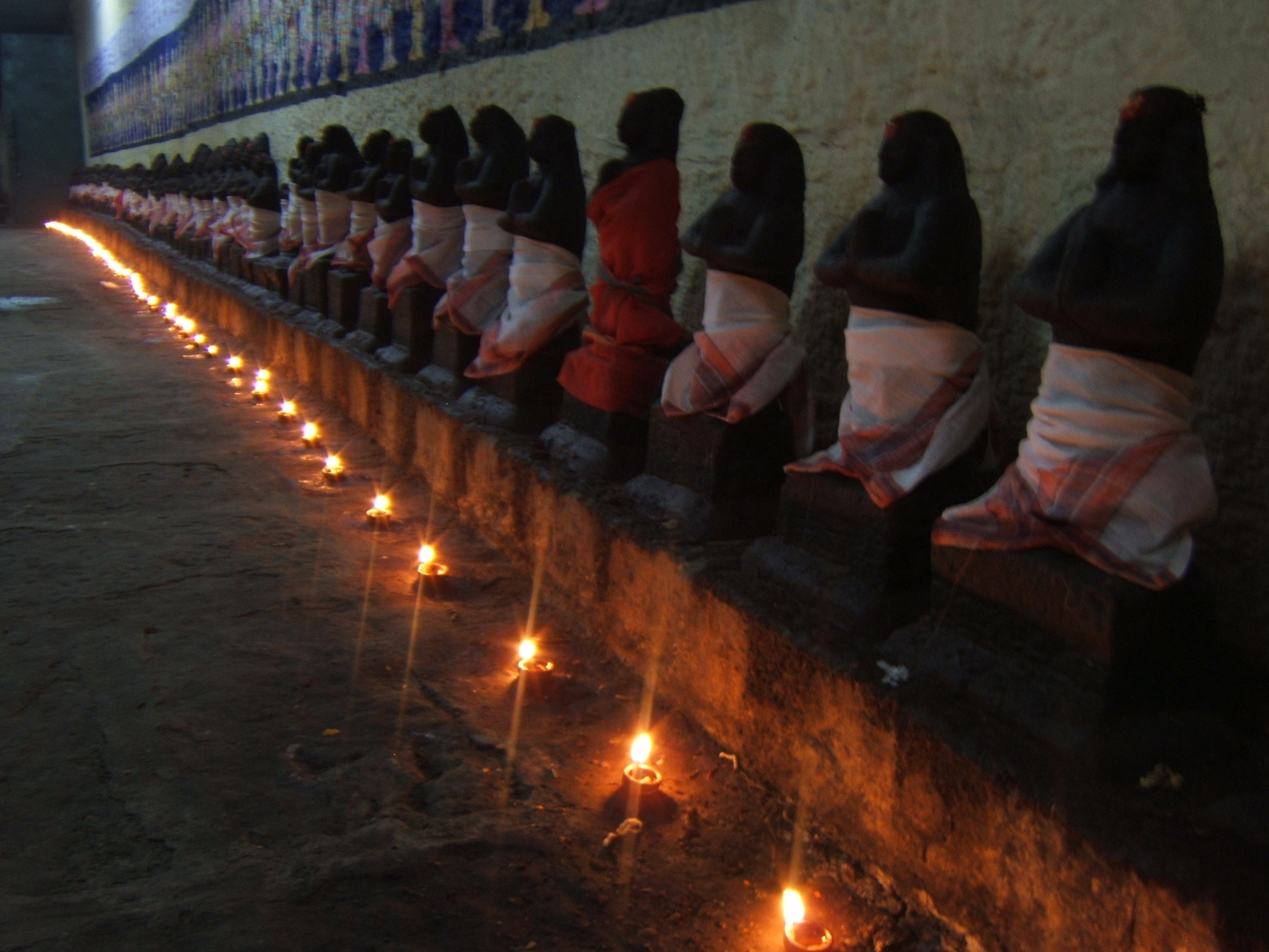
The images of the Nayanars are found in many Shiva temples in Tamil Nadu.

One of the most prominent Nayanars, Sundarar (8th century) mentions Murthi Nayanar (called Murtti) in hymn to various Nayanar saints. He is said to rule over the world, through the "three emblems of sovereignty".

Murthi Nayanar is depicted wearing a crown, with folded hands (see Anjali mudra) and holding a club in the crook of his arm. A holy day in his honour is observed on the ninth day of the Tamil month of Adi, generally coinciding with 10th of August. He receives collective worship as part of the 63 Nayanars. Their icons and brief accounts of his deeds are found in many Shiva temples in Tamil Nadu. Their images are taken out in procession in festivals.
