= List of mayors of Bengaluru =

The Mayor is a constitutional position in each of the five City Corporations constituted under the Greater Bengaluru Authority within the city of Bengaluru (Greater Bengaluru Area). Under the Greater Bengaluru Governance Act, 2024 (Karnataka Act No. 36 of 2025), which came into force on 15 May 2025, the former Bruhat Bengaluru Mahanagara Palike (BBMP) was dissolved and replaced by a three-tier governance structure. As of 2 September 2025, when the new structure became fully operational, Bengaluru is administered by five City Corporations:

Corporations	No. of Wards	Mayor
Bengaluru Central City Corporation	63	TBE
Bengaluru North City Corporation	72	TBE
Bengaluru South City Corporation	72	TBE
Bengaluru East City Corporation	50	TBE
Bengaluru West City Corporation	112	TBE
Greater Bengaluru Authority	369	-

Each Corporation is headed by its own elected Mayor and an appointed Commissioner. There is no longer a single Mayor for Bengaluru. Instead, each of the five Mayors serves their respective City Corporation and is an ex-officio member of the Greater Bengaluru Authority (GBA), the apex coordinating body chaired by the Chief Minister of Karnataka. The role of Mayor is largely ceremonial. The Mayor also plays a functional role in deliberating over discussions in their respective City Corporation. The term of each Mayor is set for 30 months as per the Greater Bengaluru Governance Act, 2024.

Previously, under the Bruhat Bengaluru Mahanagara Palike Act, 2020, Bengaluru had a single Mayor for the entire city with a five-year term, which was never implemented as no council was elected after the enactment of this law, which was eventually replaced with Greater Bengaluru Governance Act, 2024. Under the earlier Karnataka Municipal Corporations Act, 1976, the term of the Mayor was fixed at one year.

== Mayors of Bengaluru (Unified) 1949–2025 ==
Mayor of Bengaluru
- Beṅgaḷūru Mēyar
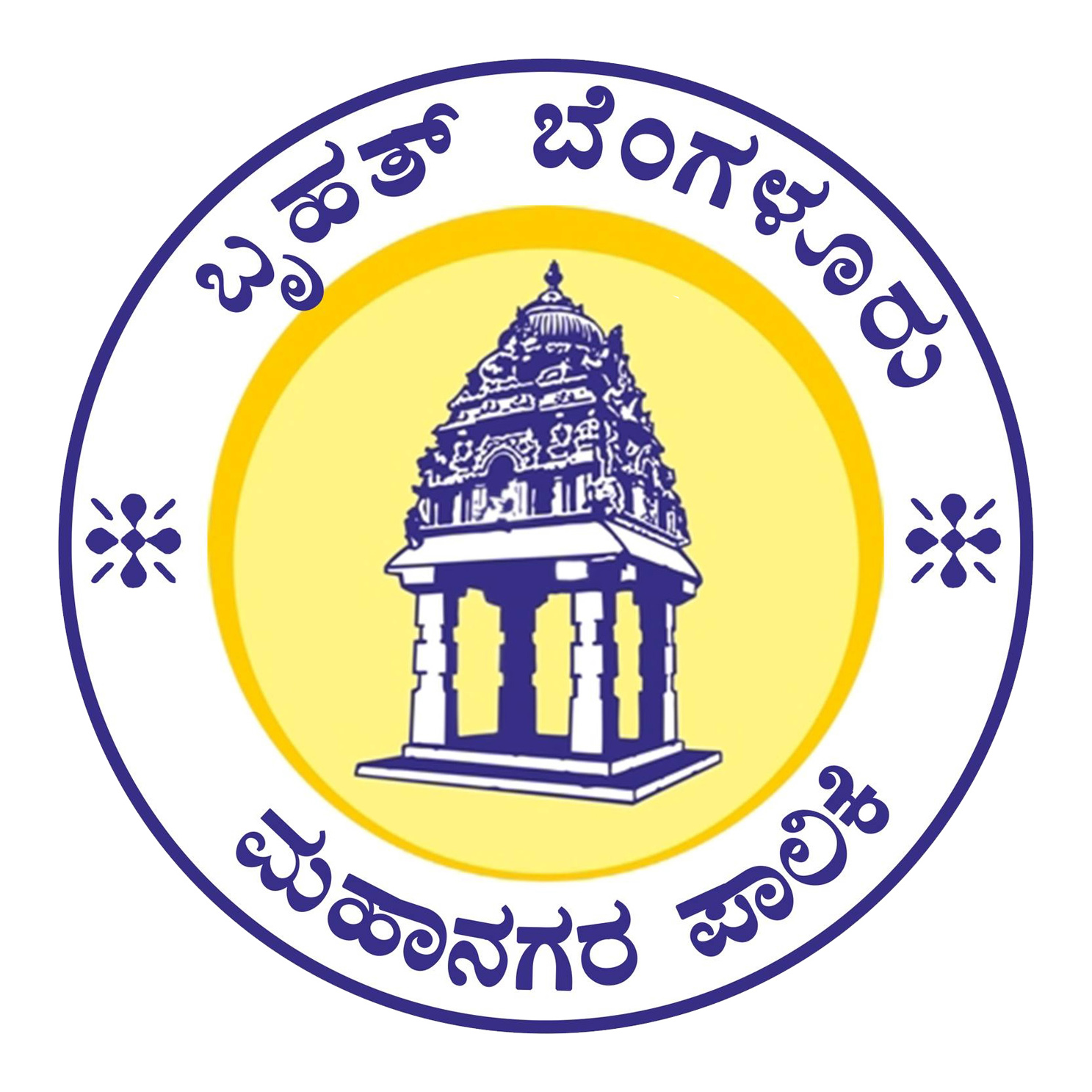
- Emblem of Bengaluru

- Flag of India
- Incumbent; Abolished
- Style: Mr./Mrs./Ms. Mayor
- Member of: Bruhat Bengaluru Mahanagara Palike
- Seat: Bengaluru
- Nominator: Members of BBMP, MLAs and MPs representing the City
- Appointer: Indirectly appointed by the Electoral College
- Term length: 12 months
- Constituting instrument: Karnataka Municipal Corporations Act, 1976
- Formation: 1949; 77 years ago
- First holder: R. Subbanna
- Final holder: M Goutham Kumar
- Abolished: September 2, 2025; 12 months ago
- Deputy: Deputy Mayor of Bengaluru

No.	Mayor	Term start	Term end	Party	Notes
Corporation of the City of Bangalore (1949 – 1950); City of Bangalore Municipal Corporation Act, 1949 paved the way for the formation of the Corporation of the City of Bangalore (CCB) in 1949 with 70 elected member in 50 electoral divisions (wards) by the merger of Bangalore Municipal Board (City area) and the Bangalore Cantonment Board (Cantonment Area).The number of electoral divisions was further increased to 52 renamed in 1950 as Bangalore City Corporation (BCC).
1	R. Subbanna	1949	1950	INC	First Nominated Mayor of Bengaluru; served under the Corporation of the City of Bangalore
Bangalore City Corporation - First Council (1950 – 1954); 1950 Bangalore City Corporation Elections. (First Elections as a City Corporation)Indian National Congress held a majority throughout this period.
2	N. Keshava Iyengar	1950	1951	INC	First Elected Mayor under the renamed Bangalore City Municipal Corporation.; Later Lok Sabha MP for Bangalore North(1952 – 1957); First Mayor with mother tongue as Tamil.; First non-Kannadiga Mayor.
3	R. Anantharaman	1951	1952	INC	
4	B. V. Lankappa	1952	1953	INC	
5	V. Hanumanthaiah	1953	1954	INC	
Bangalore City Corporation - Second Council (1954 – 1959) 1954 Bangalore City Corporation Elections. Indian National Congress held a majority throughout this period.
6	H. S. Seetharam	1954	1955	INC	First Mayor with mother tongue as Telugu.
7	V.P. Deenadayalu Naidu	1955	1956	INC	
8	M. Krishnappa	1956	1957	INC	
9	Jeena Bai Devidas	1957	1958	INC	First woman Mayor
10	Y. Ramachandra	1958	1959	INC	
Bangalore City Corporation - Third Council (1959 – 1964) 1959 Bangalore City Corporation Elections. Indian National Congress held a majority throughout this period.
11	N. Narayana Chetty	1959	1960	INC	
12	B. Indiramma	1960	1961	INC	Second woman Mayor
13	B. Nanjappa	1961	1962	INC	
14	V. S. Krishna Iyer	1962	1963	INC	Later founder member of the Janata Party (1977); Later Lok Sabha MP for Bangalore South(1984 – 1989)
15	K. M. Nanjappa	1963	1964	INC	
Bangalore City Corporation - Fourth Council (1964 – 1967); 1964 Bangalore City Corporation Elections. Indian National Congress held a majority throughout this period.
16	G. Narayana	1964	1965	INC	
17	K. M. Naganna	1965	1966	INC	
18	T. K. Thimmaraya Gowda	1966	1967	INC	
Administrator's Rule (1967 – 1971) Corporation suspended during by the Government of Karnataka.The corporation was further expanded to 63 wards in 1971.
Bangalore City Corporation - Fifth Council (1971 – 1975); 1971 Bangalore City Corporation Elections. Indian National Congress held a majority throughout this period.
19	J. Lingaiah	1971	1972	INC	
20	M. V. Tiwari	1972	1973	INC	
21	M. K. Ananthakrishna	1973	1974	INC	
22	T. D. Naganna	1974	1975	INC	
Administrator's Rule (1975 – 1983); Corporation suspended during the Emergency (1975 – 1977).. Karnataka Municipal Corporations Act, 1976 superseded the City of Bangalore Municipal Corporation Act, 1949 with the elections resuming in 1983.This legislation introduced an electoral college system, which comprised the Corporators, elected directly in the civic polls and Non-Corporators, Lok Sabha MPs, Rajya Sabha MPs, MLAs and MLCs that represent the city in their respective houses.
Bangalore City Corporation - Sixth Council (1983 – 1989) 1983 Bangalore City Corporation Elections. Janata Party held both the house and the electoral college majority throughout the period till 1988, before losing the electoral college majority to Janata Dal. First time any party other than Congress had led the Bengaluru civic body since Independence.
23	S. Sundar Raj	1983	1984	JP	
24	L. Subbaraj	1984	1985	JP	
25	B. K. M. Gowda	1985	1986	JP	
26	B. V. Puttegowda	1986	1987	JP	
27	Dr. M. J. Sheshadri	1987	1988	JP	
28	Lawrence V. Fernandes	1988	1989	JD	
Administrator's Rule (1989 – 1990); The corporation was expanded to 87 wards and renamed as the Bangalore Mahanagara Palike (BMP) in 1989 by merging surrounding areas.
Bangalore Mahanagara Palike - Seventh Council (1990 – 1995) 1989 Bangalore Mahanagara Palike Elections. Indian National Congress held both the house and the electoral college majority throughout this period.
29	K. C. Vijaya Kumar	28 May 1990	29 June 1991	INC	First Mayor under the Bangalore Mahanagara Palike
30	K. Narayana Swamy	19 June 1991	29 June 1992	INC	
31	Lakkanna	29 June 1992	28 June 1993	INC	
32	B. S. Sudanva	28 June 1993	27 June 1994	INC	
33	G. Kuppaswamy	27 June 1994	27 June 1995	INC	
Administrator's Rule (June 1995 – November 1996); The corporation was further expanded to 100 wards in 1995.
Bangalore Mahanagara Palike - Eighth Council (1996 – 2001) 1996 Bangalore Mahanagara Palike Elections. Indian National Congress held both the house and the electoral college majority throughout this period.
34	Padmavathi Gangadhar Gowda	25 November 1996	29 November 1997	INC	Third woman Mayor
35	J. Huchappa	29 November 1997	30 November 1998	INC	
36	K. H. N. Simha	30 November 1998	29 November 1999	INC	
37	M. Ramachandrappa	29 November 1999	29 November 2000	INC	
38	Prema Cariappa	29 November 2000	23 November 2001	INC	Fourth woman Mayor; Later Rajya Sabha MP for Karnataka (2002 – 2007)
Bangalore Mahanagara Palike - Ninth Council (2001 – 2006); 2001 Bangalore Mahanagara Palike Elections.Indian National Congress held both the house and the electoral college majority throughout this period.
39	K. Chandrashekhar	24 November 2001	30 November 2002	INC	
40	C. M. Nagaraj	30 November 2002	28 November 2003	INC	
41	P. R. Ramesh	28 November 2003	29 November 2004	INC	
42	R. Narayana Swamy	29 November 2004	29 November 2005	INC	
43	Mumtaz Begum	29 November 2005	23 November 2006	INC	First Muslim Mayor; Fifth woman Mayor; First Mayor with mother tongue as Urdu.
Administrator's Rule (November 2006 – April 2010) The corporation was expanded to 198 wards and renamed as the Bruhat Bengaluru Mahanagara Palike (BBMP) in 2007 by merging surrounding seven Urban Local Bodies and several urbanized villages.
Bruhat Bengaluru Mahanagara Palike - Tenth Council (2010 – 2015); 2010 Bruhat Bengaluru Mahanagara Palike Elections.Bharatiya Janata Party held both the house and the electoral college majority throughout this period.First time any party other than Congress had led the Bengaluru civic body for the entire term single handedly since Independence.
44	S. K. Nataraja	23 April 2010	28 April 2011	BJP	First Mayor under the Bruhat Bengaluru Mahanagara Palike
45	Sharadamma Ramanjaneya	29 April 2011	26 April 2012	BJP	Sixth woman Mayor
46	D. Venkatesh Murthy	26 April 2012	3 September 2013	BJP	Longest-serving Mayor; the only Mayor to have presented two consecutive BBMP budgets
47	B. S. Satyanarayana (Katte Satya)	4 September 2013	5 September 2014	BJP	
48	N. Shanthakumari	5 September 2014	18 April 2015	BJP	Seventh woman Mayor
Bruhat Bengaluru Mahanagara Palike - Eleventh Council (2015 – 2020) 2015 Bruhat Bengaluru Mahanagara Palike Elections. Bharatiya Janata Party held the house majority but lost the electoral college majority to the Congress - JD(S) coalition, before gaining it back in 2019.First time and the last time any party that had the house majority lost the electoral college majority since the introduction of the system in 1983.
49	B. N. Manjunath Reddy	11 September 2015	28 September 2016	INC	
50	G. Padmavathi	28 September 2016	28 September 2017	INC	Eighth woman Mayor
51	R. Sampath Raj	28 September 2017	28 September 2018	INC	
52	Gangambike Mallikarjun	28 September 2018	28 September 2019	INC	Ninth woman Mayor
53	M Goutham Kumar	1 October 2019	10 September 2020	BJP	Last Mayor of Unified Bengaluru.; First Mayor with mother tongue as Hindi.
Administrator's Rule (September 2020 – September 2025); BBMP council elections were repeatedly delayed, first due to the COVID-19 pandemic and later pending delimitation and ward reservation exercises. The BBMP was formally dissolved on 2 September 2025 upon the Greater Bengaluru Governance Act, 2024 coming into full effect.

== Mayors of Bengaluru (Five Mayors of Greater Bengaluru Authority) 2025–present ==
Mayor of Bengaluru Central
- Beṅgaḷūru Kēndrada Mēyar
- Flag of India
- Incumbent; Vacant since September 2, 2025; 12 months ago
- Style: Mr./Mrs./Ms. Mayor
- Member of: Bengaluru Central City Corporation
- Seat: Hudson Circle
- Nominator: Members of Bengaluru Central City Corporation
- Appointer: Indirectly appointed
- Term length: 30 months
- Constituting instrument: Greater Bengaluru Governance Act, 2024
- Formation: September 2, 2025; 12 months ago
- First holder: TBE
- Deputy: Deputy Mayor of Bengaluru Central
- Website: Greater Bengaluru Authority; Bengaluru Central City Corporation

The Current Municipal Administration Setup in Bengaluru
Apex Body	Municipal Corporations	No. of Wards
Greater Bengaluru Authority	Bengaluru Central City Corporation	63
Greater Bengaluru Authority	Bengaluru North City Corporation	72
Greater Bengaluru Authority	Bengaluru South City Corporation	72
Greater Bengaluru Authority	Bengaluru East City Corporation	50
Greater Bengaluru Authority	Bengaluru West City Corporation	112

=== Bengaluru Central City Corporation ===
No.	Mayor	Term start	Term end	Party	Notes
Administrator's Rule (September 2025 – present); Commissioners appointed for all five corporations pending elections. Under the Greater Bengaluru Governance Act, 2024, Bengaluru is now administered by five City Corporations - Bengaluru Central, Bengaluru North, Bengaluru South, Bengaluru East and Bengaluru West, under the apex body Greater Bengaluru Authority.
Bengaluru Central City Corporation - First Council (TBE); 2026 Bengaluru Central City Corporation Elections.Greater Bengaluru Governance Act, 2024 paved the way for the formation of the Bengaluru Central City Corporation (BCCC) in 2025 with 63 wards by bifurcating Bruhat Bengaluru Mahanagara Palike.The First Elections are to be held by August 2026.
1				Vacant	First Mayor of the Bengaluru Central City Corporation

=== Bengaluru North City Corporation ===
Mayor of Bengaluru North
- Beṅgaḷūru Uttarada Mēyar
- Emblem of the Bengaluru North

- Flag of India
- Incumbent; Vacant since September 2, 2025; 12 months ago
- Style: Mr./Mrs./Ms. Mayor
- Member of: Bengaluru North City Corporation
- Seat: Yelahanka
- Nominator: Members of the Bengaluru North City Corporation
- Appointer: Indirectly appointed
- Term length: 30 months
- Constituting instrument: Greater Bengaluru Governance Act, 2024
- Formation: September 2, 2025; 12 months ago
- First holder: TBE
- Deputy: Deputy Mayor of Bengaluru North
- Website: Greater Bengaluru Authority; Bengaluru North City Corporation

No.	Mayor	Term start	Term end	Party	Notes
Administrator's Rule (September 2025 – present); Commissioners appointed for all five corporations pending elections. Under the Greater Bengaluru Governance Act, 2024, Bengaluru is now administered by five City Corporations - Bengaluru Central, Bengaluru North, Bengaluru South, Bengaluru East and Bengaluru West, under the apex body Greater Bengaluru Authority.
Bengaluru North City Corporation - First Council (TBE); 2026 Bengaluru North City Corporation Elections.Greater Bengaluru Governance Act, 2024 paved the way for the formation of the Bengaluru North City Corporation (BNCC) in 2025 with 72 wards by bifurcating Bruhat Bengaluru Mahanagara Palike.The First Elections are to be held by August 2026.
1				Vacant	First Mayor of the Bengaluru North City Corporation

=== Bengaluru South City Corporation ===
Mayor of Bengaluru South
- Beṅgaḷūru Dakṣiṇada Mēyar
- Emblem of the Bengaluru South

- Flag of India
- Incumbent; Vacant since September 2, 2025; 12 months ago
- Style: Mr./Mrs./Ms. Mayor
- Member of: Bengaluru South City Corporation
- Seat: Jayanagar
- Nominator: Members of Bengaluru South City Corporation
- Appointer: Indirectly appointed
- Term length: 30 months
- Constituting instrument: Greater Bengaluru Governance Act, 2024
- Formation: September 2, 2025; 12 months ago
- First holder: TBE
- Deputy: Deputy Mayor of Bengaluru South
- Website: Greater Bengaluru Authority; Bengaluru South City Corporation

No.	Mayor	Term start	Term end	Party	Notes
Administrator's Rule (September 2025 – present); Commissioners appointed for all five corporations pending elections. Under the Greater Bengaluru Governance Act, 2024, Bengaluru is now administered by five City Corporations - Bengaluru Central, Bengaluru North, Bengaluru South, Bengaluru East and Bengaluru West, under the apex body Greater Bengaluru Authority.
Bengaluru South City Corporation - First Council (TBE); 2026 Bengaluru South City Corporation Elections.Greater Bengaluru Governance Act, 2024 paved the way for the formation of the Bengaluru South City Corporation (BSCC) in 2025 with 72 wards by bifurcating Bruhat Bengaluru Mahanagara Palike.The First Elections are to be held by August 2026.
1	TBE	TBE	TBE	Vacant	First Mayor of the Bengaluru South City Corporation

=== Bengaluru East City Corporation ===
Mayor of Bengaluru East
- Beṅgaḷūru Pūrvada Mēyar
- Flag of India
- Incumbent; Vacant since September 2, 2025; 12 months ago
- Style: Mr./Mrs./Ms. Mayor
- Member of: Bengaluru East City Corporation
- Seat: Mahadevapura
- Nominator: Members of Bengaluru East City Corporation
- Appointer: Indirectly appointed
- Term length: 30 months
- Constituting instrument: Greater Bengaluru Governance Act, 2024
- Formation: September 2, 2025; 12 months ago
- First holder: TBE
- Deputy: Deputy Mayor of Bengaluru East
- Website: Greater Bengaluru Authority; Bengaluru East City Corporation

No.	Mayor	Term start	Term end	Party	Notes
Administrator's Rule (September 2025 – present); Commissioners appointed for all five corporations pending elections. Under the Greater Bengaluru Governance Act, 2024, Bengaluru is now administered by five City Corporations - Bengaluru Central, Bengaluru North, Bengaluru South, Bengaluru East and Bengaluru West, under the apex body Greater Bengaluru Authority.
Bengaluru East City Corporation - First Council (TBE); 2026 Bengaluru East City Corporation Elections.Greater Bengaluru Governance Act, 2024 paved the way for the formation of the Bengaluru East City Corporation (BECC) in 2025 with 50 wards by bifurcating Bruhat Bengaluru Mahanagara Palike.The First Elections are to be held by August 2026.
1	TBE	TBE	TBE	Vacant	First Mayor of the Bengaluru East City Corporation

=== Bengaluru West City Corporation ===
Mayor of Bengaluru West
- Beṅgaḷūru Paścimada Mēyar
- Emblem of the Bengaluru West

- Flag of India
- Incumbent; Vacant since September 2, 2025; 12 months ago
- Style: Mr./Mrs./Ms. Mayor
- Member of: Bengaluru West City Corporation
- Seat: Rajarajeshwari Nagar
- Nominator: Members of Bengaluru West City Corporation
- Appointer: Indirectly appointed
- Term length: 30 months
- Constituting instrument: Greater Bengaluru Governance Act, 2024
- Formation: September 2, 2025; 12 months ago
- First holder: TBE
- Deputy: Deputy of Mayor of Bengaluru West
- Website: Greater Bengaluru Authority; Bengaluru West City Corporation

No.	Mayor	Term start	Term end	Party	Notes
Administrator's Rule (September 2025 – present); Commissioners appointed for all five corporations pending elections. Under the Greater Bengaluru Governance Act, 2024, Bengaluru is now administered by five City Corporations - Bengaluru Central, Bengaluru North, Bengaluru South, Bengaluru East and Bengaluru West, under the apex body Greater Bengaluru Authority.
Bengaluru West City Corporation - First Council (TBE); 2026 Bengaluru West City Corporation Elections.Greater Bengaluru Governance Act, 2024 paved the way for the formation of the Bengaluru West City Corporation (BWCC) in 2025 with 112 wards by bifurcating Bruhat Bengaluru Mahanagara Palike.The First Elections are to be held by August 2026.
1	TBE	TBE	TBE	Vacant	First Mayor of the Bengaluru West City Corporation
