= B. R. Murty =

Indian botanist

Bhyravabhotla Radhakrishna Murty
- Born: 4 April 1928; Andhra Pradesh, India
- Died: 16 May 2003 (aged 75)
- Education: Cornell University
- Known for: Conservation genetics; Radiation genetics
- Awards: 1972 Shanti Swarup Bhatnagar Prize
- Scientific career
- Fields: Genetics; Biometry
- Workplaces: Indian Agricultural Research Institute; Cambridge University; Nuclear Research Laboratory; International Atomic Energy Agency
- Doctoral advisor: Royse P. Murphy

Bhyravabhotla Radhakrishna Murty (1928–2003) was an Indian botanist, known for his contributions the fields of Conservation genetics and Radiation genetics. He was a professor of Biochemistry Division at Indian Agricultural Research Institute, Pusa and was an elected fellow of Indian Academy of Sciences and the Indian National Science Academy. The Council of Scientific and Industrial Research, the apex agency of the Government of India for scientific research, awarded him the Shanti Swarup Bhatnagar Prize for Science and Technology, one of the highest Indian science awards, in 1973, for his contributions to biological sciences.

== Biography ==
Radhakrishna Murty, born on 4 April 1928, secured his PhD from Cornell University in 1960, working under the supervision of renowned Botanist, Royse Peak Murphy. Returning to India, he joined the Indian Agricultural Research Institute, Delhi as a biometrical geneticist in 1961 and in 1966 he was promoted as the co-ordinator of the All India Project for Crop Improvement, a post he held till 1974. After serving as a Nuffield University Professional Fellow at Cambridge University during 1973–74, he joined International Atomic Energy Agency in 1974 where he worked till 1986, holding the position of the project director of the Nuclear Research Laboratory from 1974 to 1984. He also served as a visiting professor at three US universities, Cornell University, Colorado State University and Ohio State University, as an honorary professor at University of Zulia, Venezuela, as an INSA Senior Scientist from 1988 to 1991 and as a professor of biochemistry at the Pusa campus of the Indian Agricultural Research Institute.

Murty died on 16 May 2003, at the age of 75. The Indian National Science Academy has included a biographical sketch on him in their publication, Biographical memoirs of fellows of the Indian National Science Academy, published in 2005.

== Legacy ==
Murty was the pioneer of biometrical genetics at the Indian Agricultural Research Institute when he started his research on the subject in 1961 during his stint at their Delhi campus. There, he worked on the genetic divergence of crops for disease resistance, stress tolerance and quality, which was reported to have assisted in the development of different varieties of crops. His researches have been documented by way of several articles and three books, Genetic Studies of Some Hybrid Derivatives of Nicotiana Rustica and Nicotiana Tabacum, Bajra Production: Problems and Prospects and Breeding Procedures in Pearl-millet: (Pennisetum Typhoides S. & H.). He sat in the International Committee on International Biological Programme of the United Nations from 1969 to 1975, International Committee on Plant Breeding Perspectives from 1974 1979 and the project evaluation Committee of the United Nations Development Program in 1987 and served as the director, International Training Program of Food and Agriculture Organization/IAEA and as a consultant at International Maize and Wheat Improvement Center (CIMMYT) in 1992 and International Crops Research Institute for the Semi-Arid Tropics (ICRISAT) in 1975, 1979 and 1982. He also served as a member of the editorial boards of journals such as Theoretical and Applied Breeding and Genetics and Breeding.

== Awards and honours ==
Murty, who was the president of the Indian Society of Genetics and Plant Breeding in 1979, was elected as a fellow by the Indian National Science Academy in 1974 and the Indian Academy of Sciences in 1975. He was also a fellow of the Royal Statistical Society and a member of the International Biometric Society, Genetics Society and American Statistical Association. He was awarded the Shanti Swarup Bhatnagar Prize, one of the highest Indian science awards, by the Council of Scientific and Industrial Research in 1973.

== Selected bibliography ==
- Radhakrishna Murty, Bhyravabhotla (1960). "Genetic studies of some hybrid derivatives of Nicotiana rustica and Nicotiana tabacum". VIII (256). Cornell University.
- B. R. Murthy (2005). "Baburao Shankarrao Kadam". Biographical Memoirs of Fellows of the Indian National Science Academy. 27.
- Bhyravabhotla Radhakrishna Murty (1960). Genetic Studies of Some Hybrid Derivatives of Nicotiana Rustica and Nicotiana Tabacum. Cornell University, Sept.
- S. L. Bapna; B. R. Murty (1976). Bajra Production: Problems and Prospects. Allied Publishers.
- B. R. Murty (1977). Breeding Procedures in Pearl-millet: (Pennisetum Typhoides S. & H.). Indian Council of Agricultural Research.

== See also ==
- Indian Agricultural Research Institute
