= Satyamurthy =

Satyamurthy (Tamil: சத்தியமூர்த்தி; Telugu: సత్యమూర్తి), also variously romanized as Satyamoorthy, Satyamurthi, Satyamurti, Sathyamurthy and other variants, is a Tamil and Telugu masculine given name and surname, meaning "manifestation of the Truth" (compare murti).

Notable people with the name include:

- Carole Satyamurti (1939–2019), British poet, sociologist and translator
- Gorti Satyamurthy (1954–2015), Indian screenwriter
- Immaneni Sathyamurthy, Indian cardiologist
- Narayanasami Sathyamurthy (born 1951), Indian chemist
- Sundara Sastri Satyamurti (1887–1943), Indian independence activist and politician
- S. Thomas Satyamurthi (1922–?), Indian zoologist and museum director
- K. G. Satyamurthy, Naxal leader and writer

== See also ==
- S/O Satyamurthy, a 2015 Indian film
  - S/O Satyamurthy (soundtrack)
- Poondi reservoir, named after S. Satyamurti
