= Byrapura =

- village
- Location in Karnataka, India Byrapura (India)
- Coordinates: 12.2119300°N 76.8953000°E
- Country: India
- State: Karnataka
- District: Mysore
- Talukas: Tirumakudal Narsipur

Government
  - Type: Panchayat raj
  - Body: Gram panchayat

Population (2001)
  - Total: 12,095

Languages
  - Official: Kannada
- Time zone: UTC+5:30 (IST)
- ISO 3166 code: IN-KA
- Vehicle registration: KA
- Website: karnataka.gov.in

Byrapura is a village in the southern state of Karnataka, India. It is located in the Tirumakudal Narsipur taluk of Mysore district.

== Demographics ==
As of 2001 India census, Byrapura had a population of 12095 with 6170 males and 5925 females.

== See also ==
- Mysore
- Districts of Karnataka
