= Sumati (astronomer) =

Nepalese astronomer

Sumati was a Nepali astronomer of uncertain date. He is estimated to have lived sometime between the 6th and 10th centuries AD, based on the dating of his primary work, the Sumati Tantra. Little else is known about him. He was influenced by Indian astronomy, and his writing reflects knowledge of the Sūrya-siddhānta in its earlier forms.

== The Sumati Tantra ==
Sumati's only known work is the Sumati Tantra, written in Sanskrit on palm leaves between 556 and 960 AD and kept in Kaiser library at Kathmandu. It is the first astronomical text written by a Nepalese scholar, and is largely based on Indian astronomy, with commentary and discussions of Indian texts like the Sūrya-siddhānta (5th century AD), as well as Varāhamihira's Pañca-siddhāntikā (6th century AD).

In 1409, the Sumati Tantra was translated into the local Newar language by an astrologer named Bardhan, who titled this translation the Sumati Siddhānta. Both texts were commonly used for calendrical and astrological purposes.
