= Srinath Krishnamoorthy =

Indian novelist and blogger (born 1986)

- Born: Srinath Thazhatheveetil Krishnamoorthy; 24 June 1986 (age 40); Palakkad, India
- Education: Government Engineering College, Sreekrishnapuram; Mar Athanasius College of Engineering, Kothamangalam
- Occupations: Lecturer in Artificial Intelligence, University of West of England, Villa College Malè Maldives, Novelist, Blogger, Motivational Speaker
- Writing career
- Years active: 2015–present
- Genres: Novel, Thriller, Short Stories
- Subjects: Psychology, Mysticism, Erotism, Literature, Mythology, Theology
- Notable works: Hope We Never Meet Again, The Boy Who Dreamed of Booker
- Movements: Postmodern literature, Psychoanalytics
- Website: hopewenevermeetagain.com

Srinath Krishnamoorthy (born 24 June 1986 in Palakkad, Kerala) is an Indian novelist and blogger. His first novel, Hope We Never Meet Again, a psycho-analytic thriller which deals with murderers that go unpunished, became one of the most sold out books at the Delhi World Book Fair 2016, Asia's largest book fair. There has also been news of a movie adaptation of the novel, but neither the author nor the makers have come out in open with a confirmation.

He right now serves as Lecturer for the University of West of England program in Artificial Intelligence at Villa College; Malè Maldives.
