= Sumathi Murthy =

Indian classic vocalist and civil rights activist

- Occupations: Musician, composer, LGBT rights activist

Rumi Harish (earlier known as Sumathi Murthy) is an Indian Hindustani classical vocalist, composer, artist, writer and LGBT right activist based in Bangalore. He hails from the Agra gharana of singing. He identifies as a queer transgender man.

== Music career ==
He started performing from the age of 12 years. He received her training in music from Pandit Ramarao Naik for 17 years.

He has been involved in a project called Sakhiri with Dr. Floy which consisted of a multi media show of mixing genders, electronics, visual images, poetry and music. He worked as a composer, singer and lyric writer in this project.

== Queer activism ==
In 2006, he identified as queer and formed a support group for female-born queer people named LesBiT. He and Sunil Mohan have been doing an oral history project to share the stories of queer people. They have collectively written the book Towards Gender Inclusivity which focuses on female-born gender and sexual minorities in south India. Harish and Ekta have also helped write Sunil Mohan's memoir, Your Stick Will Not Break my Strength.

Harish was also featured in the documentary Breaking Free, which talked about the LGBTQ community and the impact of the controversial Section 377 of the Indian Penal Code.

== Publications ==
- Towards Gender Inclusivity: A Study on Contemporary Concerns around Gender (with Sunil Mohan)
- Sunil Mohan, as told to Rumi Harish and Ekta, Your Stick Will Not Break My Strength (2025 Zubaan)
