= A. N. Murthy Rao =

Indian writer and activist (1900–2003)

A.N. Murthy Rao
- Born: 16 June 1900; Akkihebbalu, Mysore State, British India
- Died: 23 August 2003 (aged 103)
- Occupations: Professor and writer
- Writing career
- Genre: Fiction
- Notable awards: Sahitya Akademi Award
- Movement: Navodaya
- Website: www.anmoorthyrao.com

Akkihebbalu Narasimha Murthy Rao (16 June 1900 – 23 August 2003) was an Indian writer. He wrote in Kannada.

== Biography ==
Kannadiga scholar and critic A. N. Murthy Rao, popularly known for his book "Devaru", was born on June 18, 1900, in Akkihebbal, Mandya district. He was born to M. Subbarao and Puttamma. He spent his childhood in Melukote and Nagamangala. After completing his early education at Wesley Mission School in Mysore in 1913, he joined Mysore Maharaja's College. He completed his B.A. in 1922 and M.A. in 1924.

In 1924, he joined Mysore Maharaja's College as a tutor. In 1927, he joined Mysore University as a lecturer. In 1940, he was promoted to Assistant Professor. From 1940 to 1943, he was a lecturer at the Government College in Shimoga. In 1943, he became Assistant Director of All India Radio. In 1948, he became Principal of the Chitradurga College. He served as Professor at the Bangalore Central College and retired in 1955.

In 1955, he became Director of the Government's Department of Literature and Culture. He served as President of the Kannada Sahitya Parishat from 1954 to 1956. He also served as the Chairman of the Kannada Branch of the Southern Languages Book Trust and as a member of the Central Program Advisory Committee of All India Radio for four years.

A. N. Murthy Rao traveled extensively abroad. He received the Karnataka Rajyotsava Award, the Nadoja Award, and the Pampa Award for his book "Devaru". He was also awarded the Sahitya Akademi Award for his book "Chitragalu Mattu Patragalu".

In 1984, he was elected President of the 56th Kannada Sahitya Sammelana held at Kaivara.

His other works include "Hagala Kanasugalu", "Aleyuva Mana", "Minugu Minchu" (essay collections), "B.M.Shri", "Purushurugala Sannegalu", "Shakespeare", "Masthiyavaru Kathagalu" (critical works), "Ashadhabhooti", "Molyaire's 2 Plays", "Chandramaruta" (plays), and "Paschathya Sanna Kathagalu".

He also wrote several books in English, including the translation of K.P.P. Karantha's novel "Marali Manchiye" as "The Return to the Soil". He also wrote independently in English about S. Radhakrishnan, M. Visvesvaraya, and B.M. Srikantaiah.

Rao died on 23 August 2003 in Bangalore, at the age of 103. He was cremated with state honours the following day at Shantivana electric crematorium in Banashankari, Bangalore.

=== Accomplishments ===
As President of the Kannada Sahitya Parishat, Rao helped to integrate the organization with the government's Department of Literature and Culture. He also oversaw the publication of several new books by the Parishat. He was a prolific writer and critic, and his work had a significant impact on Kannada literature. He was awarded numerous prizes and honors for his work, including the Karnataka Rajyotsava Award, the Nadoja Award, the Pampa Award, and the Sahitya Akademi Award. He was a respected scholar and educator, and he played a major role in the development of Kannada literature and culture.

== Works ==
- AaShaDhaBhoothi (Based on one of Molière's dramas)
- Devaru:
- aleyuva mana: (essay, including Homer)
- Aparavayaskana America Yatre (travelogue, account of his travels in Chicago and other places in the U.S.)
- sanjegaNNina hinnOTa(Aftersights in the Evening)
- Hagaluganasugalu (Daydreams)
- Minugu Minchu (Flickering Lightning)
- Janatha Janardhana (Citizen God)
- Mahabharatadalli Kedu Aembudara Samasye (The problem of evil in Mahabharatha)
- Ganavihara (Traveling through music)
- Sahitya Mattu Satya (Literature and Truth)
- Hemavathi Teerada Tavasi (The hermit on the banks of Hemavathi)
- Poorvasoorigalodane (With the ancient masters)
- Shakespeare
- B. M. Srikantaiah
- Paschatya Sanna kathegalu (Western short stories)
- Chitragalu Patragalu (Sketches and Letters)
- Socratesana Koneya Dinagalu (Last days of Socrates)
- Yodhana Punaragamana (Return of the soldier)
- Samagra Lalita Prabhandhagalu

And multiple collections of light essays which he was widely known for.

== See also ==
Kuvempu
