= Ravula Suryanarayana Murty =

Indian writer and poet (born 1935)

Ravula Suryanarayana Murthy
- Born: 22 December 1935 (age 90); Narendrapuram, Rajahmundry, Andhra Pradesh
- Occupations: Poet, administrator, journalist

Ravula Suryanarayana Murty (born 22 December 1935) is an Indian writer and poet, an administrator and journalist. His parents were Sri Surya Rao and Smt. Narayamma.

== Education ==
Ravula had his primary education at Narendrapuram, his native place and completed secondary education at M.S.N. Charities High School, Kakinada. Later, he had his higher studies at P.R. College, Kakinada. He obtained his M.A. in public administration from the Utkal University, Bhubaneswar. He was later awarded a doctorate in literature for his thesis on the rural resurgence of Independent India. He was a leader of the District Student Congress Committee of East Godavari.

== Career ==
=== Editor ===
Murty began his career at age 19 in 1954 as the editor of Janasakti, a pro Congress party daily published from Kakinada, where he worked for four years. He was also the editor of the weekly Andhra Sri during the peak activity of the movement for a separate Andhra State. Murty supported the Telugu people who aspired for a state of their own as a linguistic province. He also edited the Andhra Pradesh publication while he was serving the state government.

=== Writer ===
As an official translator of Gandhian literature, Murty translated into the Telugu language a number of the works of Mahatma Gandhi, edited by Bharatan Kumarappa, including For Workers Against Prominent Untouchability and Medium of Instruction. These works were entrusted to him by the Gandhi Sahitya Prachuranalayam headed by Mallavarapu Venkata Krishna Rao, former education minister in the composite Madras state, and were published in the early 1960s.

His literary works, in general, reflect his concern for social change and probity in public life. His plays such as Vimala, MLA and Swapnamlo Swargam deal with various contemporary social issues. Another of his works was titled Sakuntalam, a poetic rendering of Kalidasa's classic. This work was a success, and many universities prescribed it as a textbook for degree classes. Other major works include Padmavathi Srinivasam, Mallepoolu, and Bhagavad Gita, copies of which are sold in millions, and a Telugu version of French novelist Émile Zola's Shame. An Introduction To Journalism is another significant book written by Dr. Ravula. He also composed an abridged version of Ramayanam in simple verse for the benefit of present-day readers. There are over 25 books to his credit.

His interest in nationalism was shown in his thesis Nava Bharata Yugodayam, where he narrated the growth and development of Indian nationalism. His thesis Rural Resurgence in Independent India, for which he was awarded D.Litt. by The World University, USA emphasizes the need for accelerating rural development programmes. It also highlights achievements made by India since independence.

=== Research on his works ===
During early 1990s Smt.Aruna was awarded a PhD in literature by the Telugu department of Sri Venkateswara University, Titupati, for her thesis on Murta's literary works and life.

=== Civil service ===
Murty was selected for Group 1 of A.P. Civil Service and was a regional tourist information officer at Tirupati for five years. Later his services were utilized by the Medical and Health Department as mass education and information officer at Chittoor. He worked as district public relations officer and ex officio, P.A. to the collector, West Godavari at Eluru, and was later appointed as assistant director in the Directorate of Public Relations, Hyderabad. As officer in charge of government publications (Telugu) and song and drama, he was responsible for publication of a large number of books on the 20-point formula envisaged by the former prime minister Smt. Indira Gandhi.

During his career as a public servant, he took training at S.E.O's Training Centre, Community Development Department, Gopalapur-on-sea (Orissa), Ramakrishna Mission Vidyalaya, Coimbatore(Tamil Nadu), Central Health Education Bureau, New Delhi and the Indian Institute of Mass Communications, New Delhi.

Murty was later appointed on a deputation basis in Tirumala Tirupati Devasthanams, Tirupati, as its public relations officer, where he maintained relationships with all departments in T.T.D. and gave coverage to the activities of the Devasthanams through various media. He planned new strategies to make T.T.D. publications widely available and helped to modernize the TTD Press.

He has supervised the production of audio cassettes of Balaji Pancharatna Mala, sung by the famous vocalist of Karnataka music Smt. M.S. Subbalakshmi, Puranapravachana of Malladi Chandra Sekhara Sastry and others.

Murty has produced a dance ballet Padmavathi Srinivasam directed by the Kuchipudi exponent Vempati China Satyam and performed by Smt. Sobha Naidu, Manjubarghavi (of Sankarabaranam fame) and others.
