= G. Padmavathi =

Indian politician

50th Mayor of Bangalore
- In office September 2016 – 28 September 2017
- Preceded by: Manjunath Reddy
- Succeeded by: R. Sampath Raj
- Constituency: Prakash Nagar

G. Padmavathi is an Indian politician. She was 50th and also the seventh female Mayor of Bangalore.

== Personal life ==
Padmavathi completed her graduation in B.A. from Bangalore University in 1979. Padmavathi is married to R Jaya Gopal and the couple have three children.

== Career ==
Padmavathi served as a Councillor for four times (1989, 1996) from Prakash Nagar ward (ward no. 98) of Bangalore. Padmavathi unsuccessfully fought the 2008 Karnataka Legislative Assembly election from the Rajajinagar constituency on an Indian National Congress ticket and lost to three term member of the Karnataka Legislative Assembly and Ex-minister in the Government of Karnataka S. Suresh Kumar of the Bharatiya Janata Party by about 14000 votes. In September 2016 she contested in the Bruhat Bangalore Mahanagara Palike (BBMP) election as a candidate of Indian National Congress (INC). In 2016 the post was reserved for backward minority people. Indian National Congress selected her as the mayor candidate just before the election. She got 142 votes in the election. Her closest competitor D.H. Lakshmi of Bharatiya Janata Party secured 120 votes. After winning in the election she became a mayor of the city and M. Anand became the deputy mayor. She shared her party's views and strategy for the 2018 Karnataka Assembly election- "With all eyes on the 2018 assembly elections, I will try and fulfil chief minister Siddaramaiah's vision for Bengaluru's improvement. We will take up works on a priority basis, which will definitely help our party at a crucial time." Her term will end in 2017.

On 25 October 2016, she conducted a meeting with city municipal officers where she asked to give special attention towards public grievances. She also suggested that the Councillors of the city should co-ordinate among themselves to perform well.
