= Electronic City Elevated Expressway =

Road in India

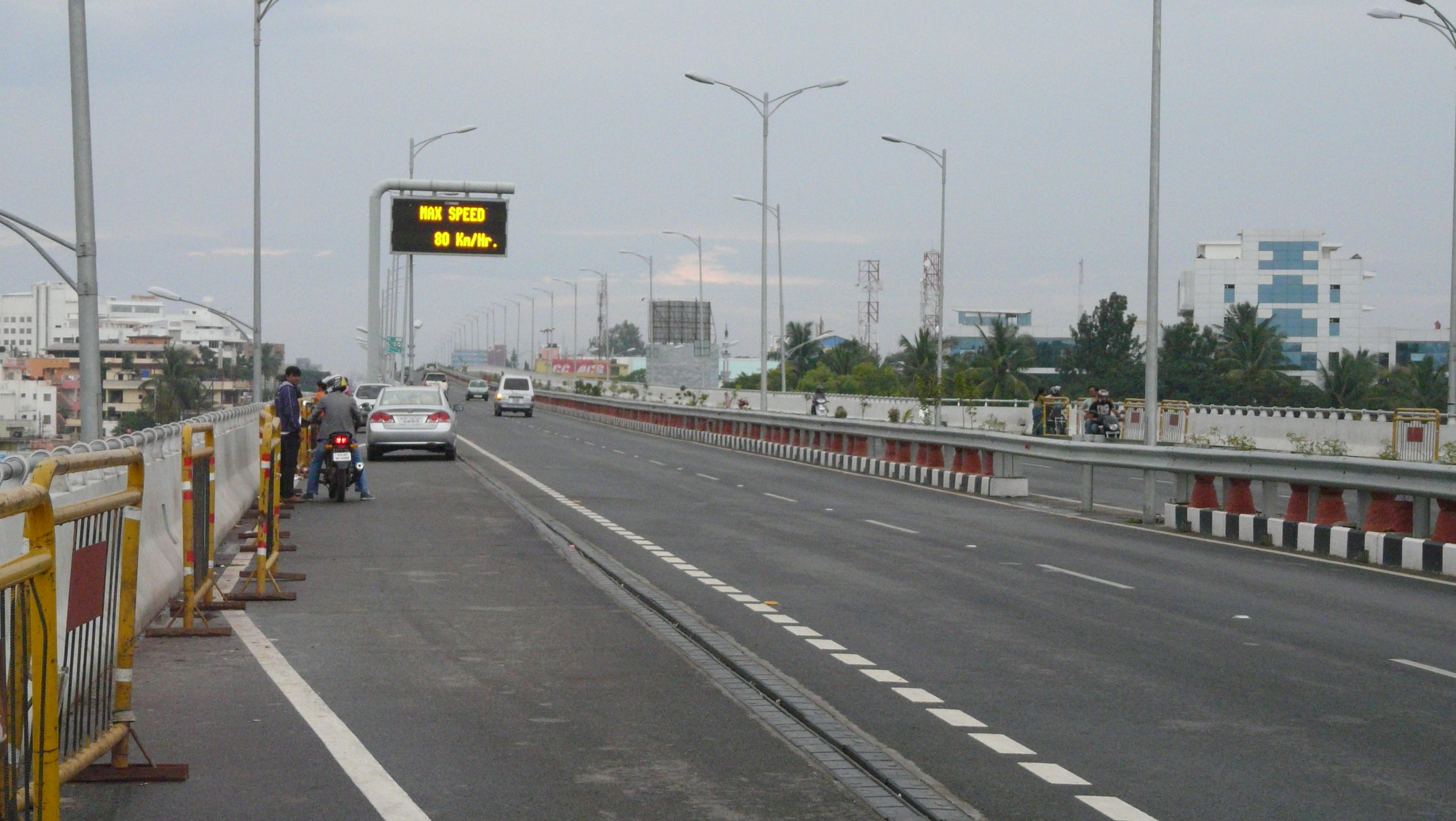
- Electronic City elevated expressway
- Carries: Road traffic
- Crosses: Bommanahalli; Garvebhavipalya; Kudlu Gate; Singasandra; Hosa Road; Bangalore–Mysore Infrastructure Corridor; Konappana Agrahara
- Locale: Bangalore
- Begins: Roopena Agrahara
- Ends: Electronic City
- Other name(s): Electronic City Expressway; Electronic City Flyover; Bengaluru City Expressway; Hosur Road Expressway
- Website: www.blrelevated.co.in

Characteristics
- Design: RCC precast structure
- Total length: 9.985 km (6.204 mi)
- Height: 17 m (56 ft)

The Electronic City Elevated Expressway is a 9.985 km (6.204 mi) long elevated highway from Silk Board junction to Electronic City in Bengaluru, India. The project was part of the BETL (Bengaluru Elevated Tollways Ltd), project as part of the National Highways Development Project and the Elevated Highways Project. It was initiated in early 2006, and was inaugurated on 22 January 2010. Operating at a height of 17 m (56 ft), it was Bangalore's tallest flyover at the time of its opening.

The elevated expressway has helped to reduce the commute time to the tech hub of Electronic City greatly. The Bruhat Bengaluru Mahanagara Palike and Bangalore Development Authority had planned a series of flyovers and underpasses to make this arterial Hosur Road signal free.

== Exits ==
The Electronic City Elevated Expressway has 3 exits in Electronic City which were, one directing towards Electronic City Phase 1 on the right side with both upward and downward ramp, second one directing Electronic City Phase 2 on the left side with downward ramp and a straight third one directing towards Hosur on NH 44 with both upward and downward ramps.

== See also ==
- Infrastructure in Bengaluru
- Inner Ring Road, Bengaluru
- Outer Ring Road, Bengaluru
- NICE Road
- Peripheral Ring Road
- Satellite Town Ring Road
