= Madivala Machideva =

Indian warrior

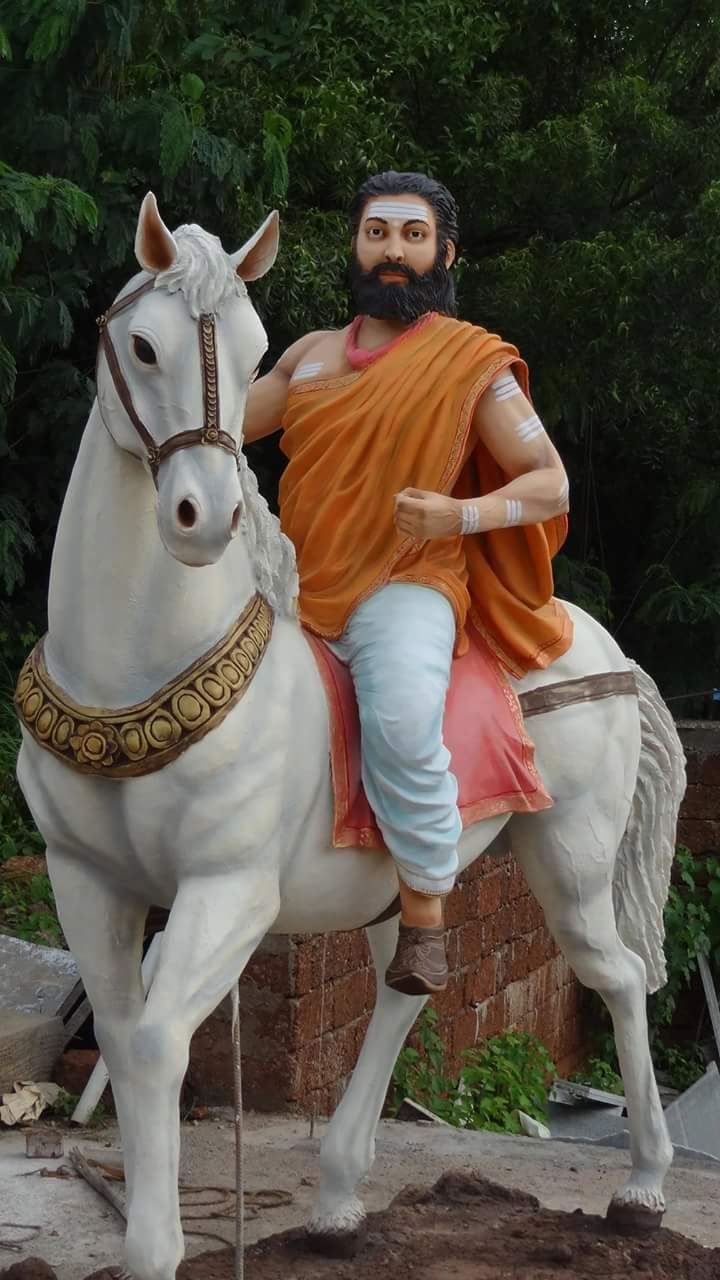
- Machideva Statue
- Born: Devara Hipparagi, Vijayapura district, Karnataka
- Died: Ulavi Karimana near Murgod in Belagavi District.
- Spouse: Mahamane
- Parents: Parvatappa (father); Sujnani (mother)

Madivala Machideva, also known as Veera Ganachari Madivala Machideva, was an Indian warrior of the 12th-century.

== Old Airport Road Bangalore ==
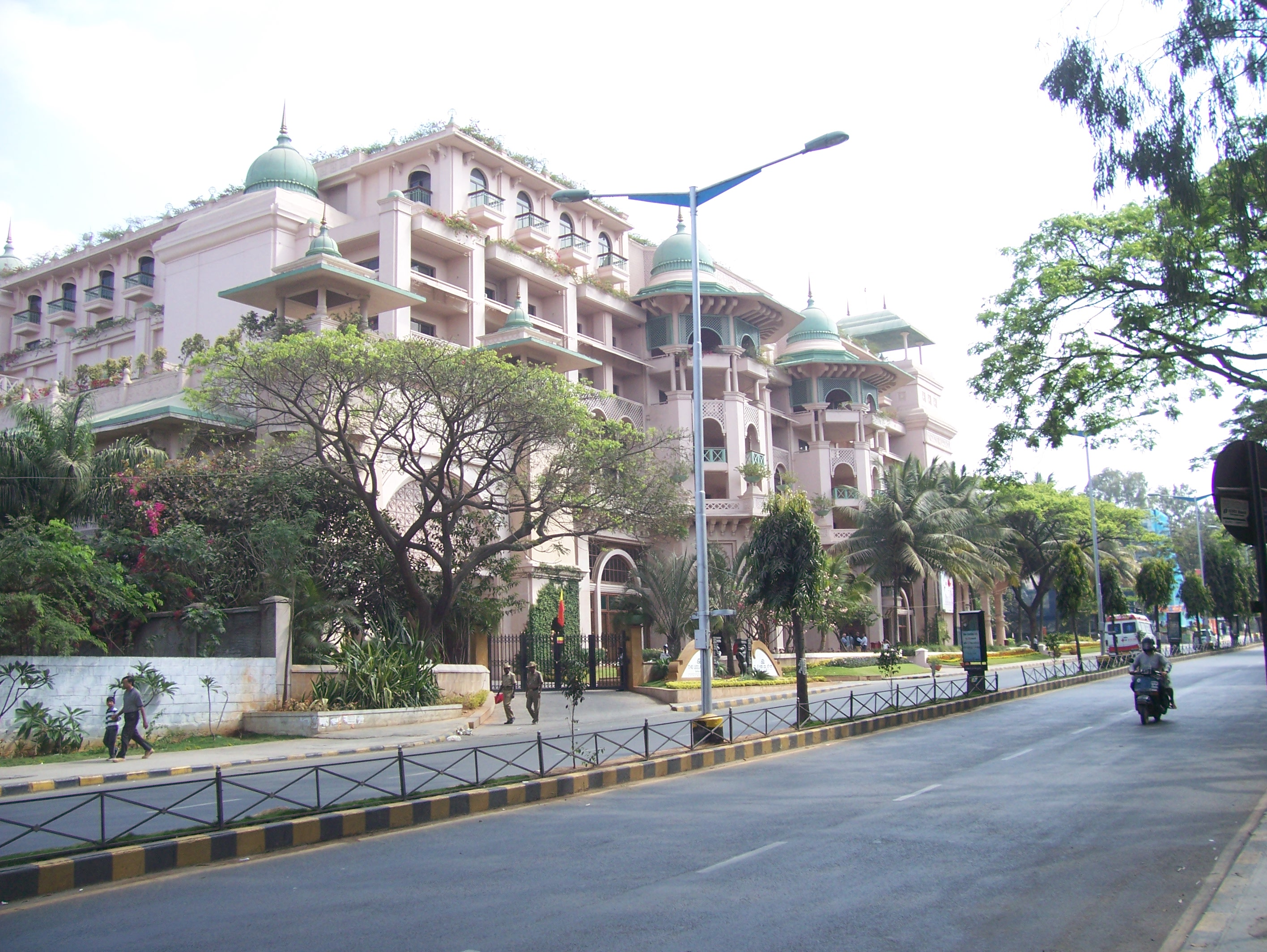
Madivala Machideva Road Bangalore, Karnataka

The Old Airport Road that connects Domlur and the old Bangalore airport was renamed as 'Madiwala Machideva Road' in his honour in September 2016.12th century great warrior and saint of LINGAYAT dharama, protected Vachanas of Basavanna.

The area of Madiwala in Bengaluru which connects and lies in between Electronic City, Koramangala, BTM Layout and Banashankari being the hub between Bannerghatta Road and Hosur Road is also named after him. The Mahasharana Madiwala Maachideva Flyover opposite to Silk Board junction is also named after him.

== Movie ==
The Kannada film Machideva, starring Sai Kumar and Charulatha, is an action drama movie depicting Machideva and directed by Nanda Kameshwara Reddy.

== See also ==
- Machideva Jayanthi
- Gadge Maharaj

== Sources ==
- Colourful procession marks Madiwala Machideva Jayanti (subscription required), The Hindu
- Vachana in "VACHANA" English Version Translation by: O.L. Nagabhushana Swamy, ISBN 978-93-81457-12-2, 2012, Pub: Basava Samithi, Basava Bhavana Benguluru 560001.
- Shivasharaneyaru, by: Shri Somashekhar Munavalli and Shri Siddhayya Puranik, 1994, Pub: Shree Basaveshwara Peetha, Karnataka University Dharwad-580003.
- Heaven of Equality, Translated by: Dr. C. R.Yaravintelimath and Dr. M. M. Kalburgi, 2003, Pub: Shree Basaveshwara Peetha, Karnataka University Dharwad-580003
