= Silk Board junction =

Road interchange in Bengaluru

Coordinates: 12.917°N 77.623°E

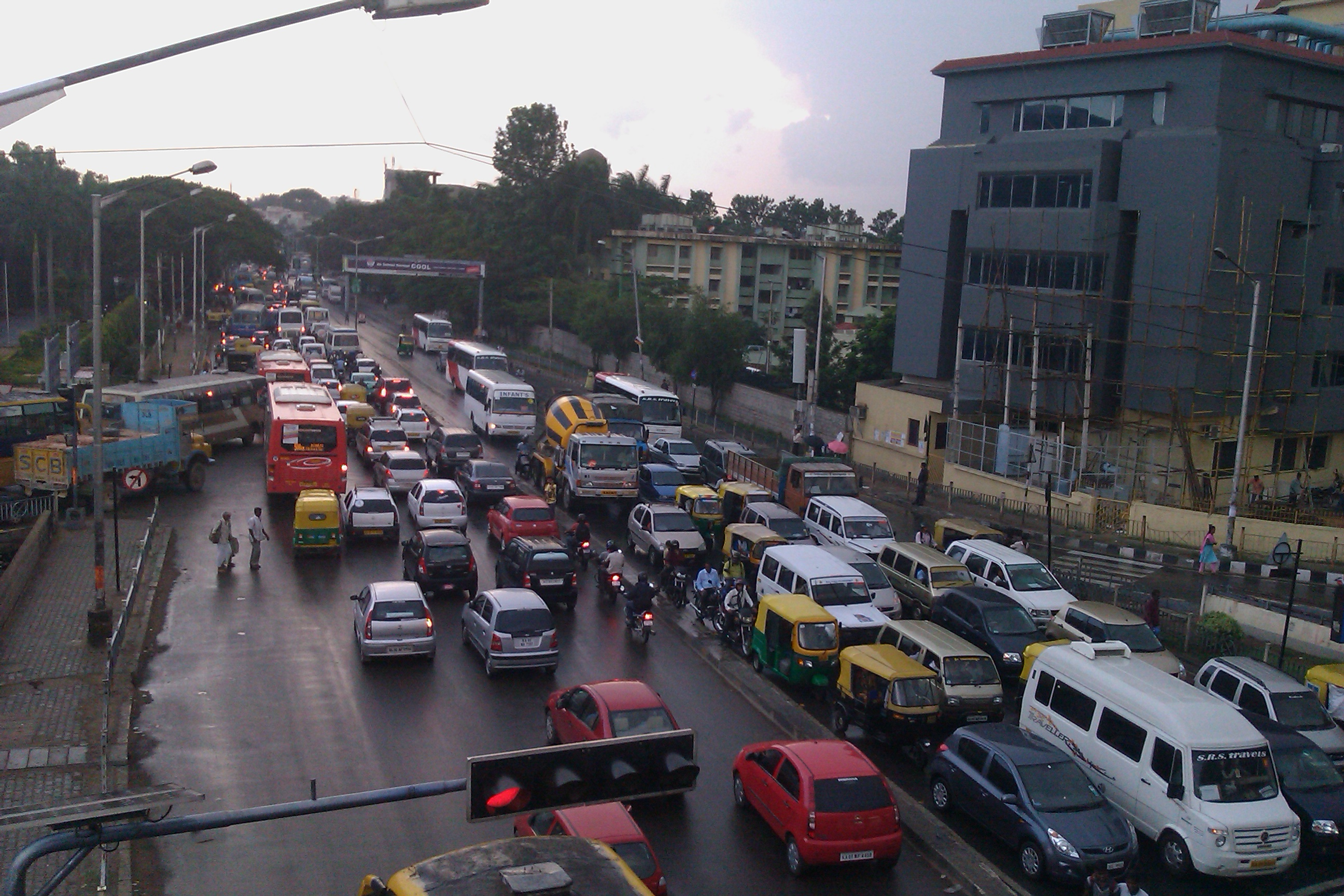
Traffic at the Silk Board junction in 2010

The Central Silk Board junction, commonly known as the Silk Board junction, is a road junction in Bengaluru, India. Located adjacent to the Central Silk Board office complex near BTM Layout at the intersection of Hosur Road and Outer Ring Road, the junction is known for its bottleneck traffic congestion as it is one of the busiest intersections in India.

== Problem ==
The Silk Board junction acts as a gateway to the two important IT clusters in Bangalore–the Outer Ring Road cluster (Marathahalli, Whitefield and Bellandur) towards the east and Electronic City to the south. The proximity to these two major hubs in the city, known as the "IT capital of India", has led to a bottleneck of vehicular movement at the junction. According to a study conducted by the Consortium of Traffic Engineers and Safety Trainers in 2017, the average speed of vehicles at the junction during peak hours is 4.48 kilometres per hour (2.78 mph), the lowest in the city. This junction also features among the seven worst traffic bottlenecks in India, a list compiled by Ola Cabs as part of a study. The junction is also one of the two most polluted areas in the city (the other being Whitefield), according to Karnataka State Pollution Control Board's survey in 2016, recording high levels of residual suspended particulate matter well above the national permissible limit; the high pollution level has been attributed to the traffic congestion at the junction.

== Action ==
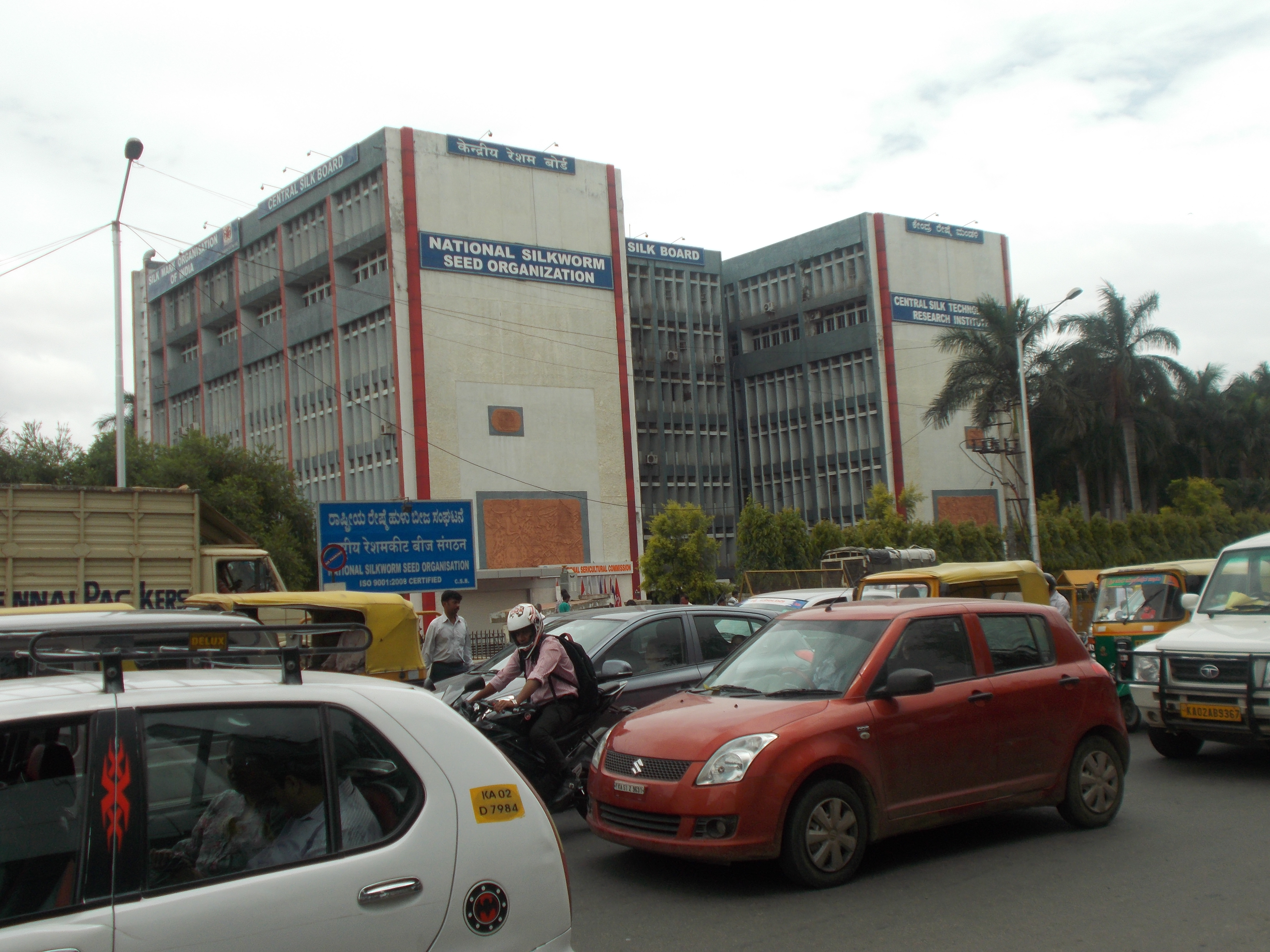
Complex of the Central Silk Board office

In 2014, the Silk Board junction bus stop was moved 250 feet (76 m) away from the junction towards HSR Layout to ensure free vehicular movement.

In 2016, the Government of Karnataka and Bangalore Development Authority gave the go-ahead to a 16-kilometre (9.9 mi) controlled access road from the Silk Board junction to K. R. Puram Outer Ring Road at a cost of ₹121 crore. In 2017, a flyover near Padmanabhanagar, which will be part of a signal-free corridor from Nayandahalli junction to Silk Board junction, was inaugurated.

In January 2017, the 17-kilometre (11 mi) Outer Ring Road Namma Metro line from Silk Board junction to K. R. Puram proposed by BMRCL, estimated to cost ₹4,202 crore, was approved by the government. The interchange station at Silk Board would cost approximately ₹900 crore and would require the acquisition of two acres of land of the Central Silk Board office and a quarter acre each on either side of the road. BMRCL also announced the construction of a 3.271-kilometre (2.033 mi) long Raggigudda-Silk Board road-cum-rail flyover between Ragigudda and Silk Board junction. The flyover will be built 8 metres (26 ft) above the ground while the metro line is planned to be constructed 16 metres (52 ft) from the surface, making it the first Metro project in which metro rail would run above a flyover. This metro line aimed to make the junction signal-free and was projected to start operation by 2020. The metro line received the state Cabinet's approval in March 2017.

== See also ==
- Central Silk Board metro station
- Bangalore Elevated Tollway
- Raggigudda-Silk Board Flyover
