= Koramangala =

Neighborhood in Bangalore, India

- Neighborhood
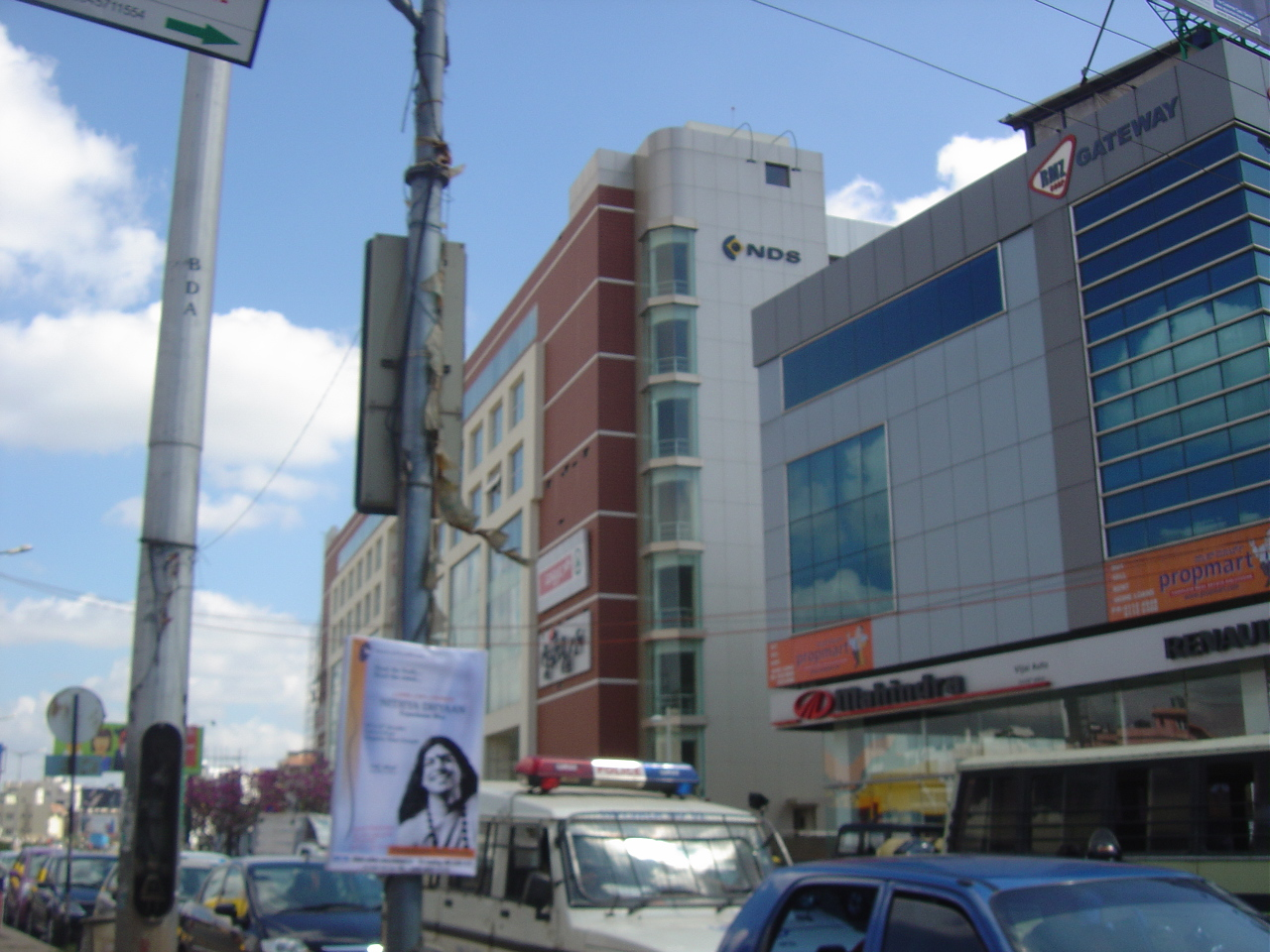
- Koramangala Junction on Hosur road

- Location within Bengaluru
- Coordinates: 12.9259°N 77.6229°E
- Country: India
- State: Karnataka
- District: Bangalore Urban
- Metro: Jayanagar metro station

Population
  - Total: 35,359

Languages
  - Official: Kannada
- Time zone: UTC+5:30 (IST)
- PIN: 560034,560095
- Vehicle registration: KA-01

Koramangala ([ˈkoːrɐˈmɐŋgɐlɐ]) is a southeastern neighbourhood of the Indian city of Bengaluru. One of the largest in that metropolis, it is a residential locality with wide, tree-lined boulevards and a mix of commercial structures and bungalows. Planned as a suburb post-independence, its location between Bengaluru and Electronic City attracted migrants from across the country during Bengaluru's tech boom of the late 1990s. Consequently, it has gradually developed into a commercial centre and a prominent startup hub known for its high land prices and high-end shopping options. As of 2026, Koramangala has a population density of over 22,000 people per km^{2}.

== Geography ==
Koramangala is divided into eight blocks spread over approximately 1,800 acres. Blocks 1–4 are separated from blocks 5–8 by the Inner Ring Road leading to Domlur/Indiranagar. Up to the 1970s, one would pass the village of Adugodi on the Hosur Road and then usually bypass Koramangala on the way to the industrial suburbs of Bommanahalli or Bommasandra, about ten and twenty kilometres away, respectively. Settlement was sparse in Koramangala, and only towards the late 1970s were more houses constructed. The road to Bommanahalli and Bommasandra now passes through Electronics City, home to various technology firms, including Infosys.

== Location ==
The distance from Koramangala to Kempegowda International Airport is 41.3 km (25.7 mi), and the distance to Majestic train station is 10.9 km (6.8 mi).
