= Nimberga =

- village
- Location in Karnataka, India Nimberga (India)
- Coordinates: 17°24′N 76°35′E
- Country: India
- State: Karnataka
- District: Kalaburagi
- Talukas: Aland

Population (2001)
  - Total: 6,345

Languages
  - Official: Kannada
- Time zone: UTC+5:30 (IST)

Nimberga is a village in the southern state of Karnataka, India. It is located in the Aland taluk of kalaburagi district. The nearby villages are Dhangapur, Battarga, Bommanahalli, Hittalashiroor&Vaijapur

== Demographics ==
As of 2001 India census, Nimberga had a population of 6345 with 3247 males and 3098 females.

== See also ==
- Gulbarga
- Districts of Karnataka
