= Shikaripalya =

- Neighbourhood
- Location within Bengaluru
- Coordinates: 12.83°N 77.65°E
- Country: India
- State: Karnataka
- District: Bangalore Urban

Languages
  - Official: Kannada
- Time zone: UTC+5:30 (IST)
- Postal code: 560105
- ISO 3166 code: IN-KA

Shikaripalya is one of the localities in Electronics City at Bangalore, the capital of the Indian state of Karnataka. It is located near Wipro Technologies in Electronics City.

Its PIN code is 560105.
