= Betl =

Betl may refer to:

- Betl (cards), a contract equivalent to misère in certain European card games
- Bangalore Elevated Tollways Ltd, a company responsible for the Hosur Road elevated expressway in India
- A C++ software library; see Boundary element method
