= ORRCA =

Bangalore Metropolitan Transport Corporation bus service

The ORRCA is Bangalore Metropolitan Transport Corporation (BMTC) Bus service to realize Common Bus Routing Systems. The system, initiated by Outer Ring Road Companies Association (ORRCA) - which comprises 24 companies including Cisco, Intel, AOL etc.- is expected to get more IT employees to use buses instead of private vehicles.

Software solutions company RCN Tech is co-ordinate the operations of the buses (such as maintaining records of bus timings, employees who use the service etc.) along with ORRCA Transport Managers.

The BMTC dedicates around 33 Volvos (AC buses) for Outer Ring Road, Bangalore companies in two shifts - 8-10 am and 5-7 pm.

Features of ORRCA Buses:

- Seat reserved for every passenger
- Bus arrives to prescribed pick up point and drop Points on time
- ORRCA passes can be used for other regular BMTC Volvo buses and Normal buses
- Cost is lesser compare to companies charter buses
- ORRCA Volvos are WiFi-enabled.

ORRCA Bus are coordinated by RCN Tech and passes are distributed by themselves.
