= Domlur =

Neighbourhood in Bangalore, Karnataka, India

- Neighbourhood
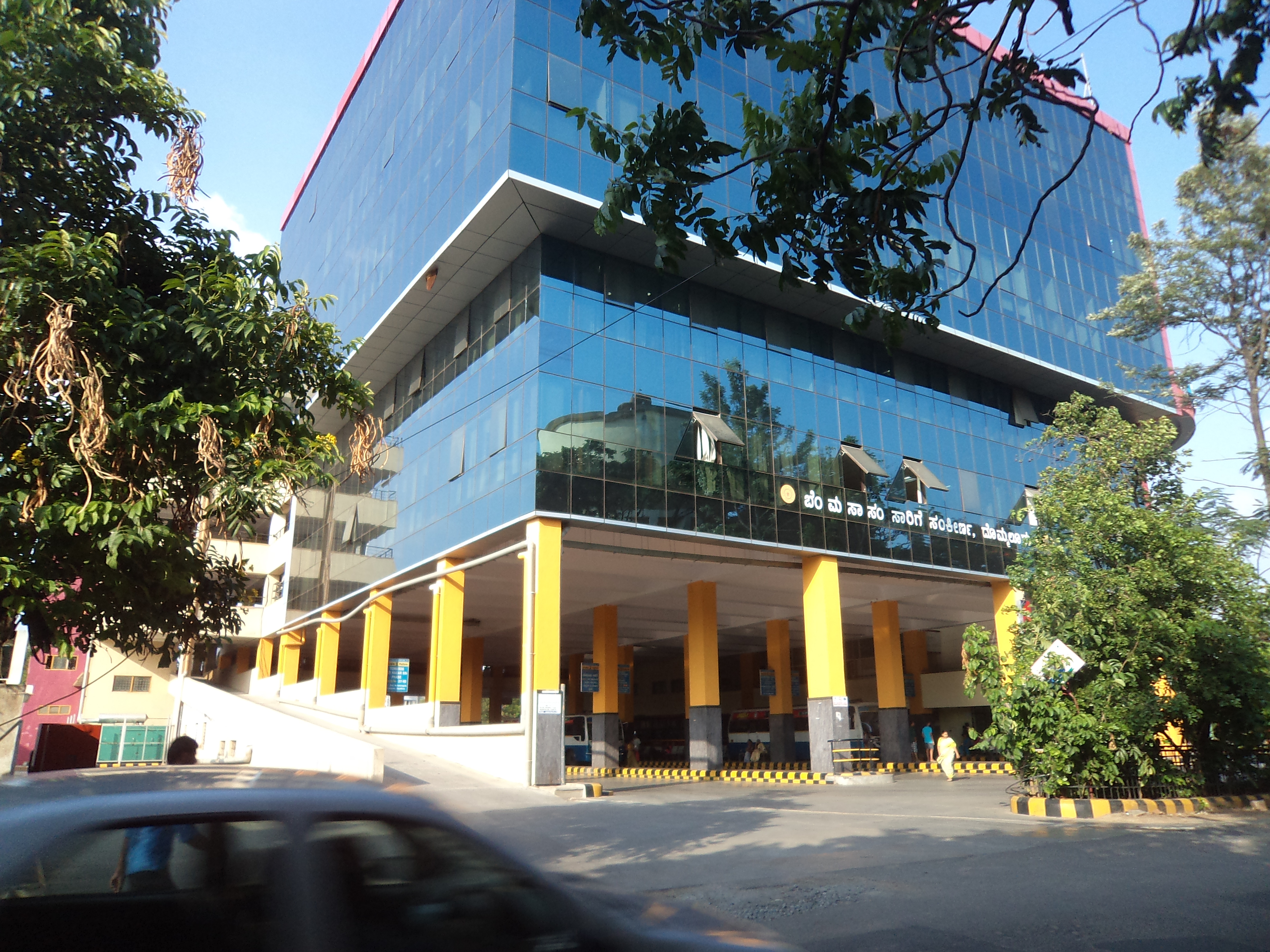
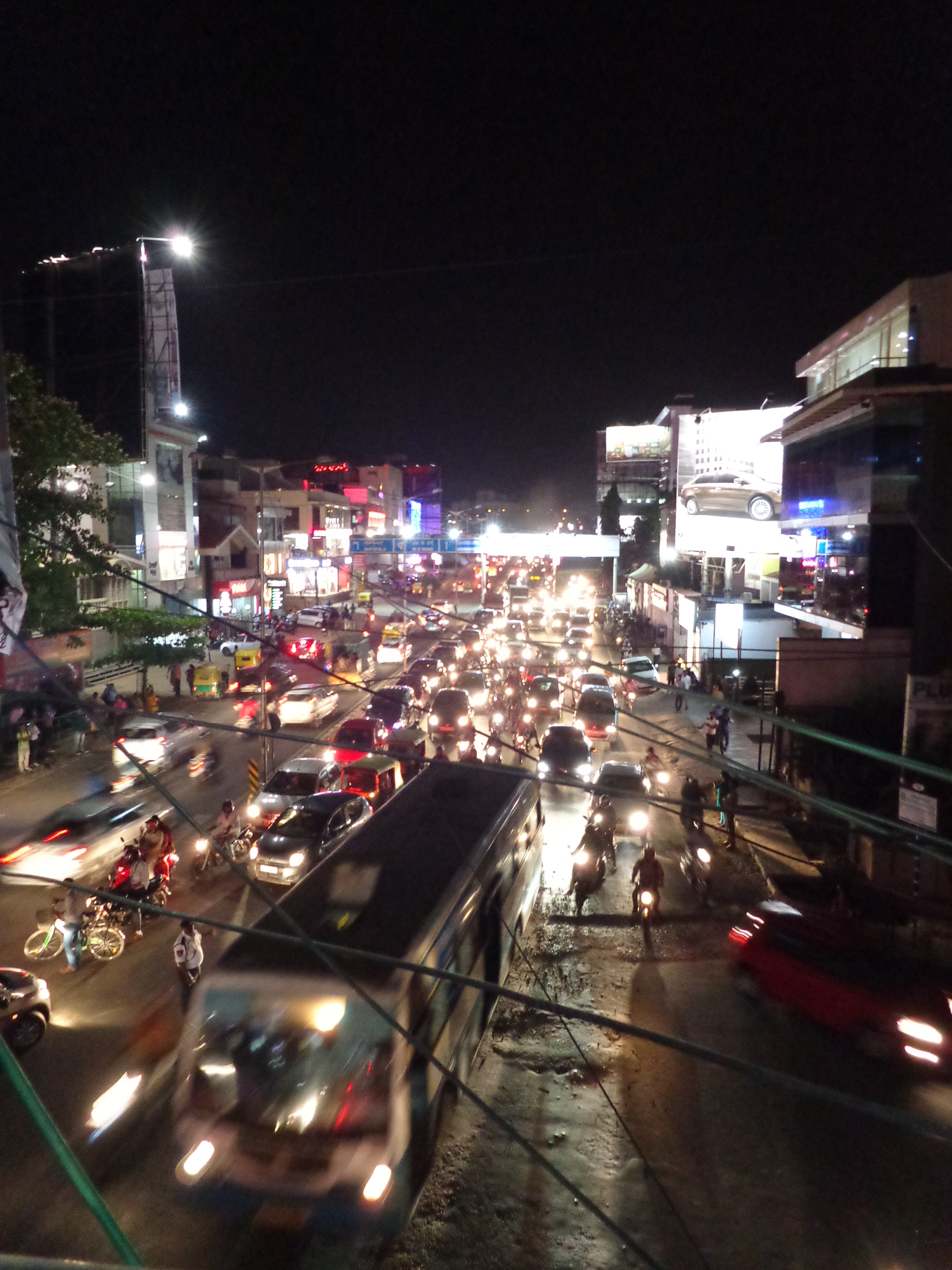
- (Top to bottom) Domlur bus depot, View from Domlur foot over bridge

- Location in Bengaluru, India
- Coordinates: 12.9608157°N 77.6361322°E
- Country: India
- State: Karnataka
- District: Bengaluru Urban
- Metro: Bengaluru
- Zone: Jayanagar
- Ward: 112

Population
  - Total: 34,703

Languages
  - Official: Kannada
- Time zone: UTC+5:30 (IST)
- PIN: 560071
- Vehicle registration: KA-03
- Lok Sabha constituency: Bangalore Central
- Vidhan Sabha constituency: Shantinagar
- Planning agency: BDA

Domlur is a small township located in the eastern part of Bangalore city in India. Domlur was included in the erstwhile Bangalore Civil and Military Station under the British Madras Presidency till it was transferred to the Mysore State in 1949.

Domlur is surrounded by offices of multinational software companies and business process outsourcing companies. Domlur hosts the software park Embassy Golf Links (EGL). McAfee, NetApp, Dell, IBM, Microsoft, ANZ, Sasken, Target and Mistral Solutions are the companies located in this area. Domlur is located close to the 'old airport'.

The major military establishments having divisions in Domlur are Indian Air Force, EME Workshop, and ASC (Army Service Corps).

== Ancient Tamil inscriptions ==
The Chokkanathaswamy Temple is a 10th-century Chola temple, located in Domlur. There are a number of Tamil inscriptions in the temple. Domlur is referred to as Tombalur or Desimanikkapattanam in these inscriptions. Chakravarthi Posalaviraramanatha Deva has left inscriptions with directions to temple authorities of his kingdom. Further, some inscriptions record the tributes, taxes and tolls made to the temple by Devaraya II of Vijayanagar Empire, which state the houses, wells, land around Tombalur were offered to the deity Sokkapperumal. Another Tamil inscription dated 1270 talks about 2 door posts being donated by Alagiyar. Yet another inscription in Tamil details Talaikkattu and his wife donating lands from Jalapalli village and Vinnamangalam tank to the deity. A 1290AD inscription talks about donation of ten pens from the revenue of Tommalur by Poysala vira Ramananda.

== Transport ==
Domlur is very well connected to all parts of Bangalore by road. There are three arterial roads in the locality- Old Airport Road, 100 Feet Road and Inner Ring Road- which connect Domlur to the rest of Bangalore city.

Domlur is easily accessible by the Bangalore Metropolitan Transport Corporation (BMTC) buses and has a sprawling bus terminus (known as Domlur Traffic Transit & Management Centre [TTMC]). The TTMC is located on the Old Airport Road and has parking facility for cars and two-wheelers. All buses from Kempegowda Bus Station, K. R. Market and Shivajinagar towards HAL, Marathahalli, Varthur and Whitefield as well as buses from Jeevanbhimanagar and Indiranagar towards Koramangala, BTM Layout, Jayanagar and Banashankari pass through Domlur.

The nearest Namma Metro station is at Indiranagar, which is around 2.5 km from Domlur.

=== Old Airport road flyover ===
A major landmark in Domlur is the Airport road flyover (also known as Domlur flyover) at the Old Airport Road, 100 Feet Road and Inner Ring Road junction. This flyover was notorious for its delay in construction and the traffic trouble caused by its delay which was due to the mismanagement by the subcontractor UPSBC ( Uttar Pradesh State Bridge Corporation). The construction of the flyover which was started in early 2003 ended in 2007. The flyover, excluding the outer loops, was completed in July 2006 and opened to public on 12 July 2006. Subsequently, the other loops were opened to public in the next eight months.

== Civic Administration ==
=== Politics ===
Domlur is part of the Shantinagar legislative assembly constituency led by MLA N. A. Haris (INC). Shantinagar in turn comes under Bangalore Central parliamentary constituency led by MP P. C. Mohan (BJP). During the 2014 general election, P. C. Mohan won from Bangalore Central defeating his nearest rival Rizwan Arshad (INC) by a margin of 1,37,500 votes. N. A. Haris won the 2018 assembly election from Shantinagar by a margin of 18,205 votes defeating his nearest rival K. Vasudevamurthy (BJP).

=== Civic Administration ===
Domlur is a ward under the Bruhat Bengaluru Mahanagara Palike (BBMP), which is the administrative body for Bangalore city and comes under the Jayanagar zone of the BBMP. The ward number is 112. The current corporator of Domlur ward is C. R. Lakshminarayan (Gundanna), who is politically an Independent.

=== Post Office ===
Domlur post office is located at Domlur 1st Stage on the Service Road running parallel to the Old Airport Road. The pin code for the area is 560071.

== Gallery ==
Domlur

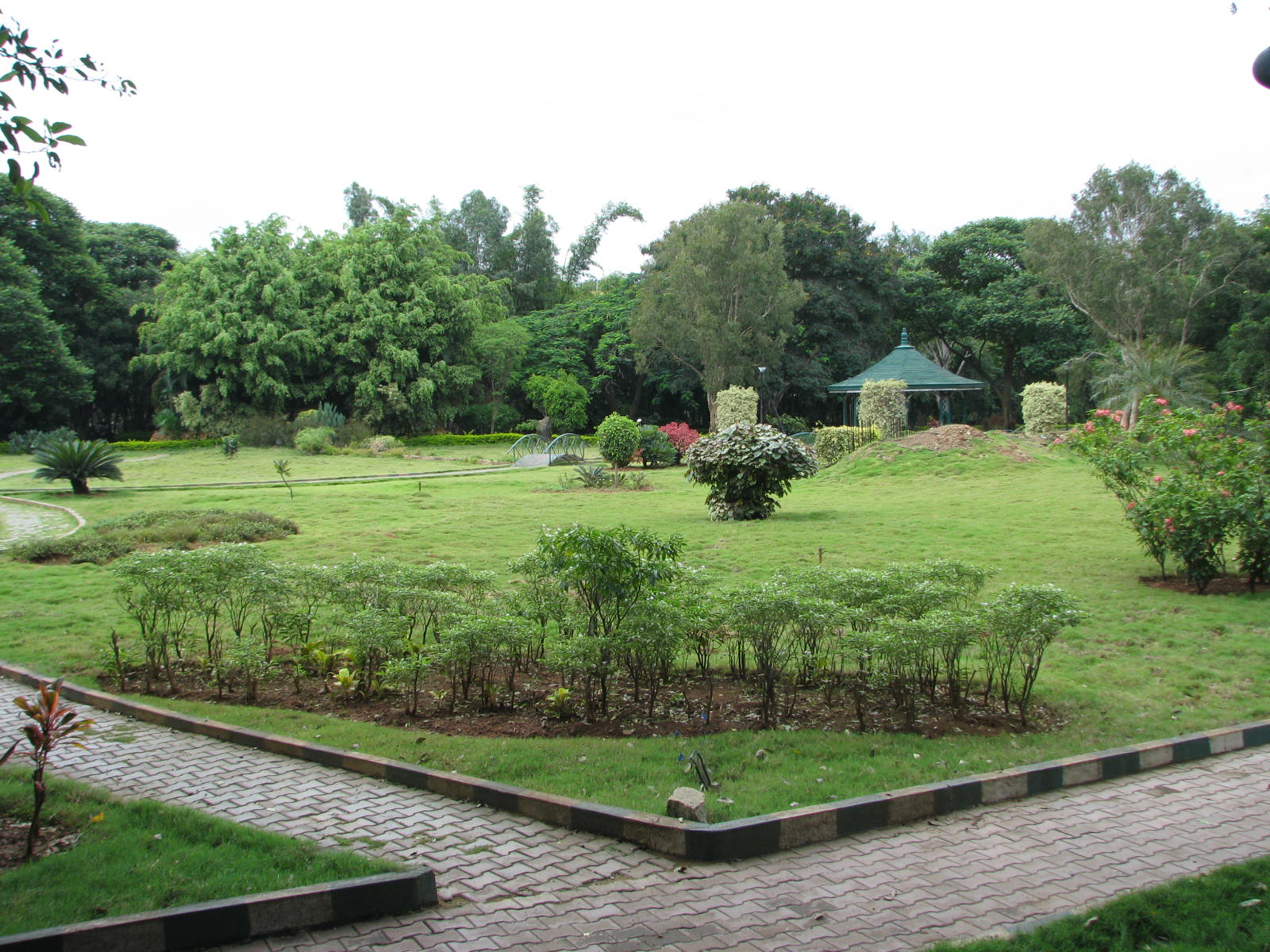
Domlur SAARC Park

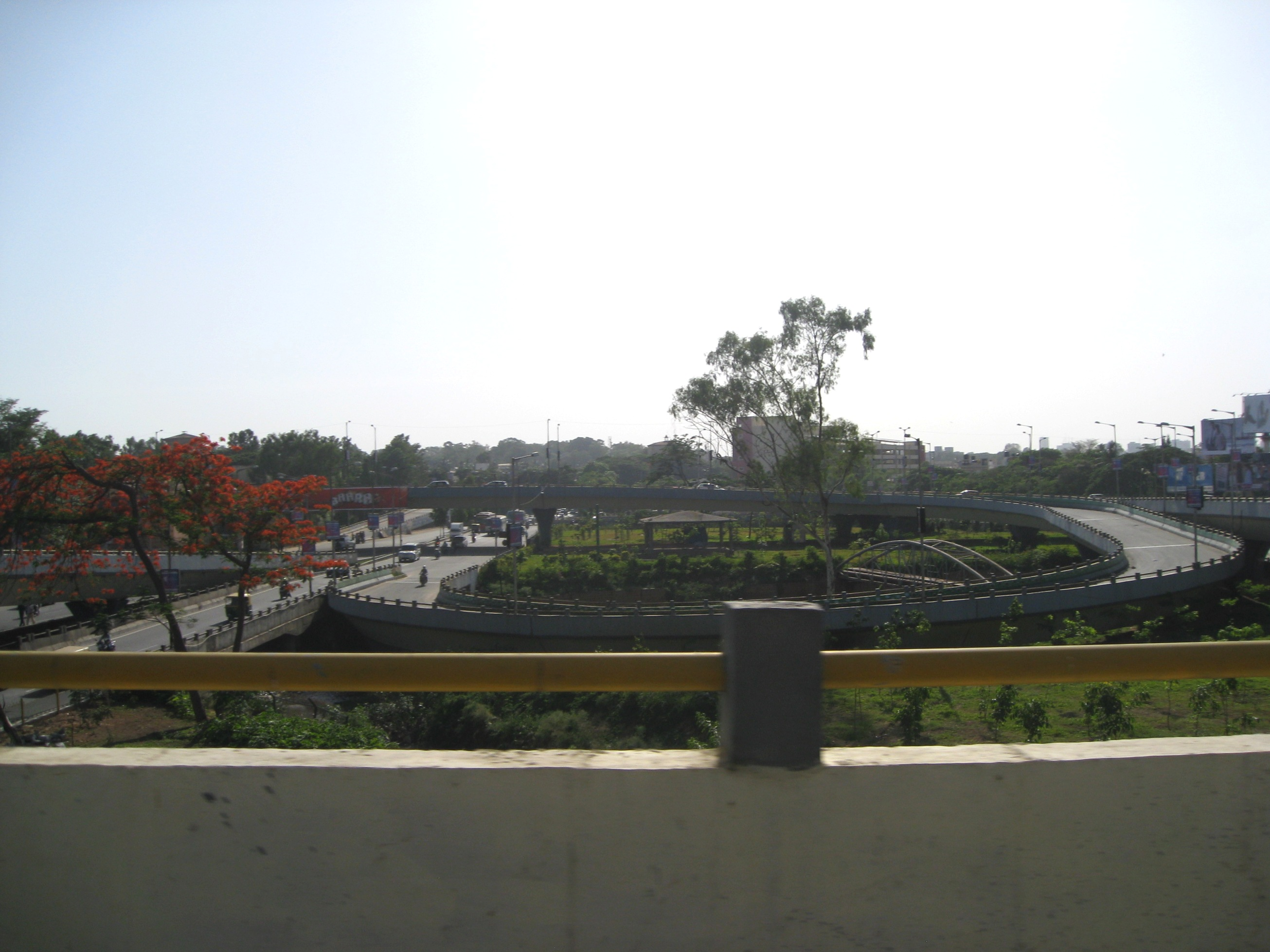
View of Old Airport Road from the Domlur Flyover

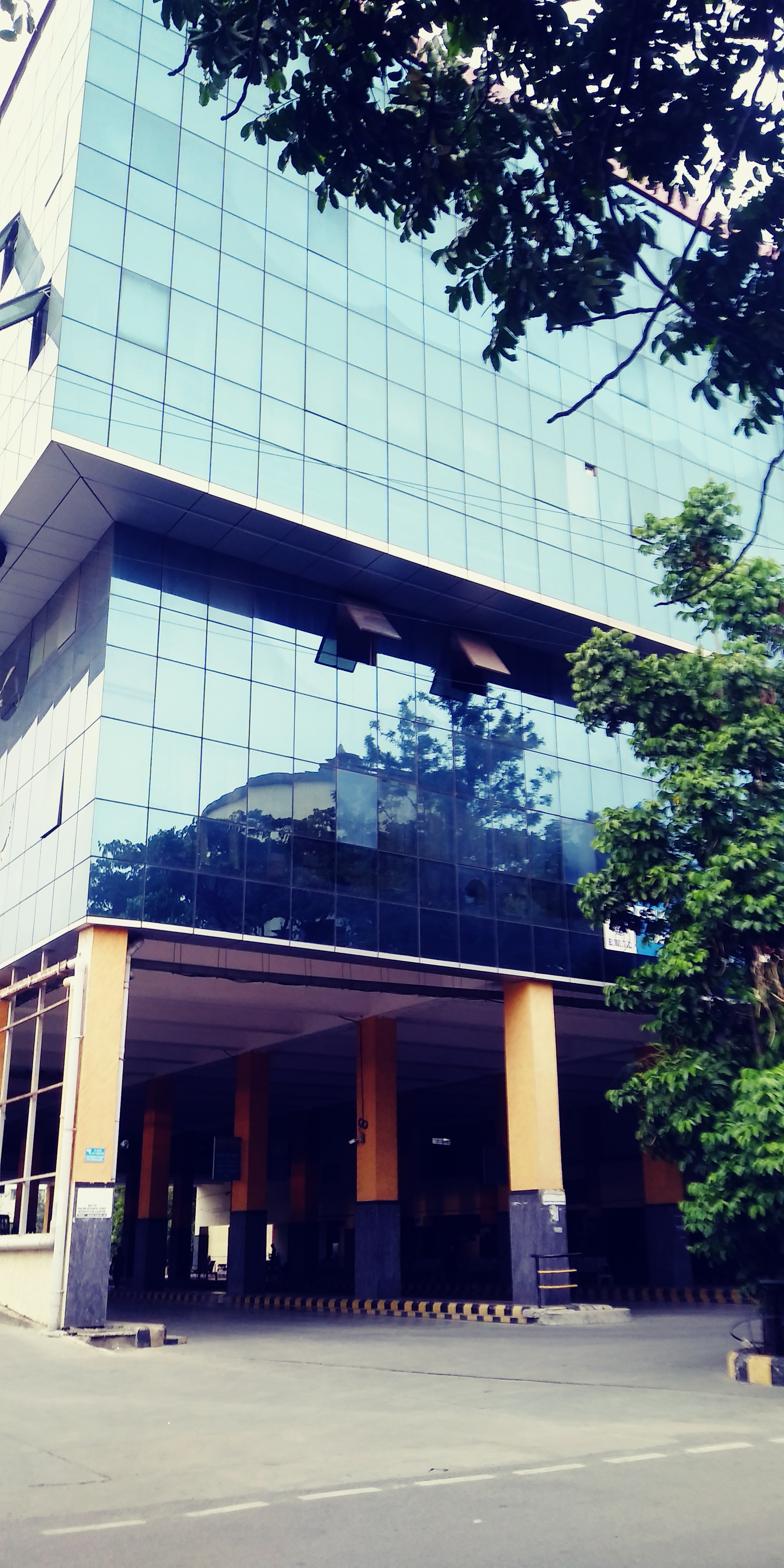
Domlur Bus Station (TTMC)

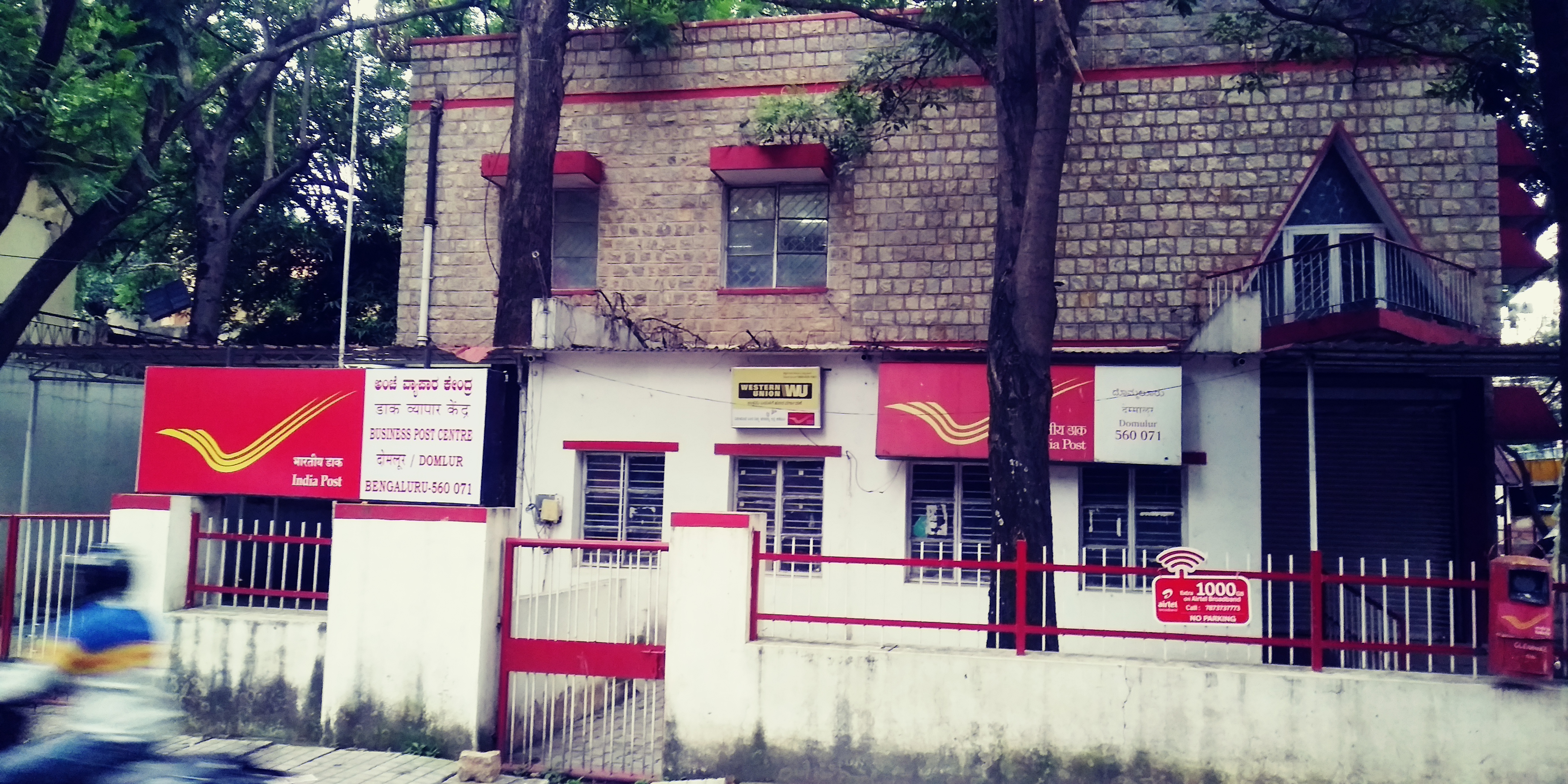
Domlur Post Office

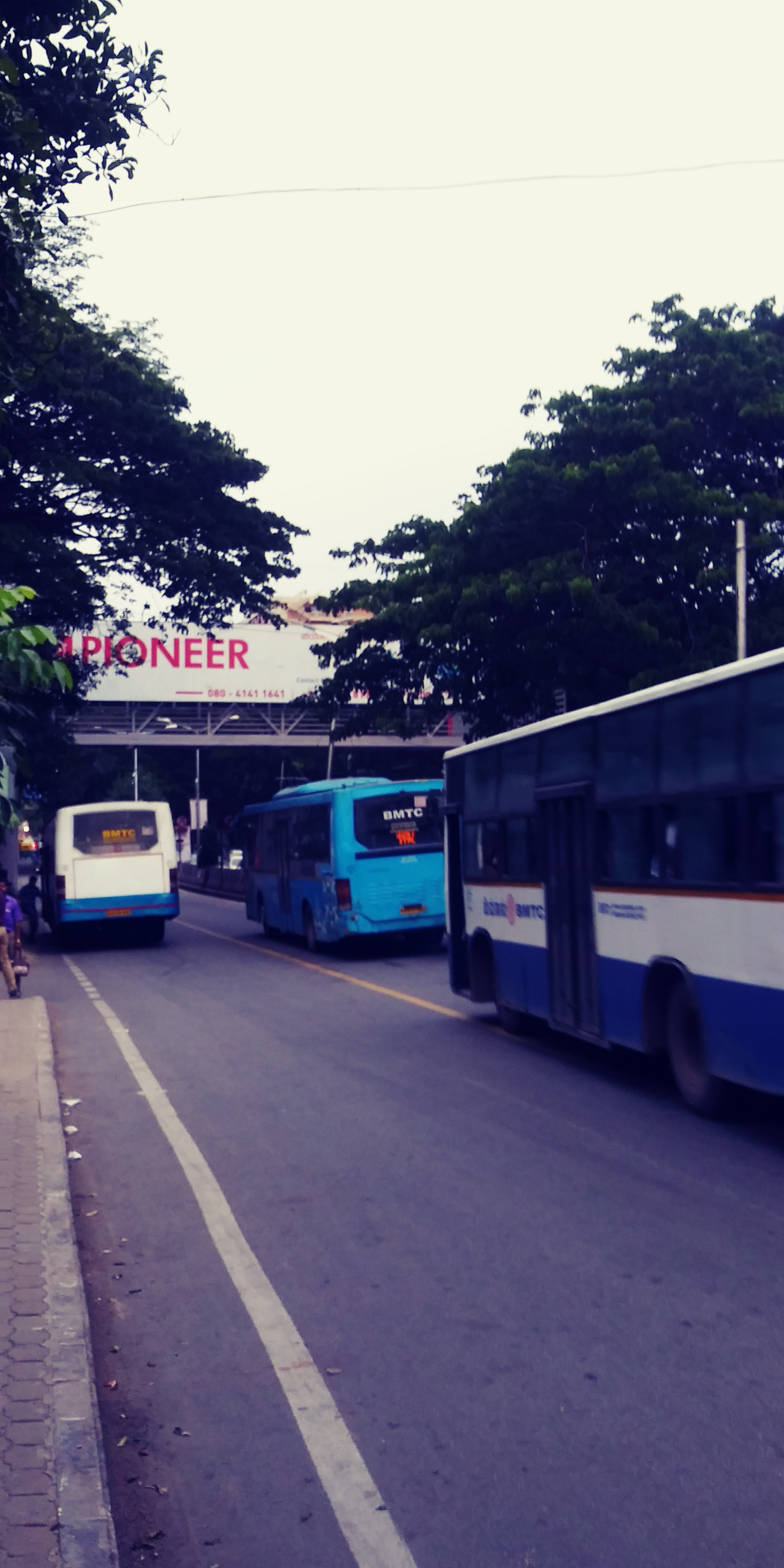
Pedestrian foot-bridge at Domlur Bus Stand Signal

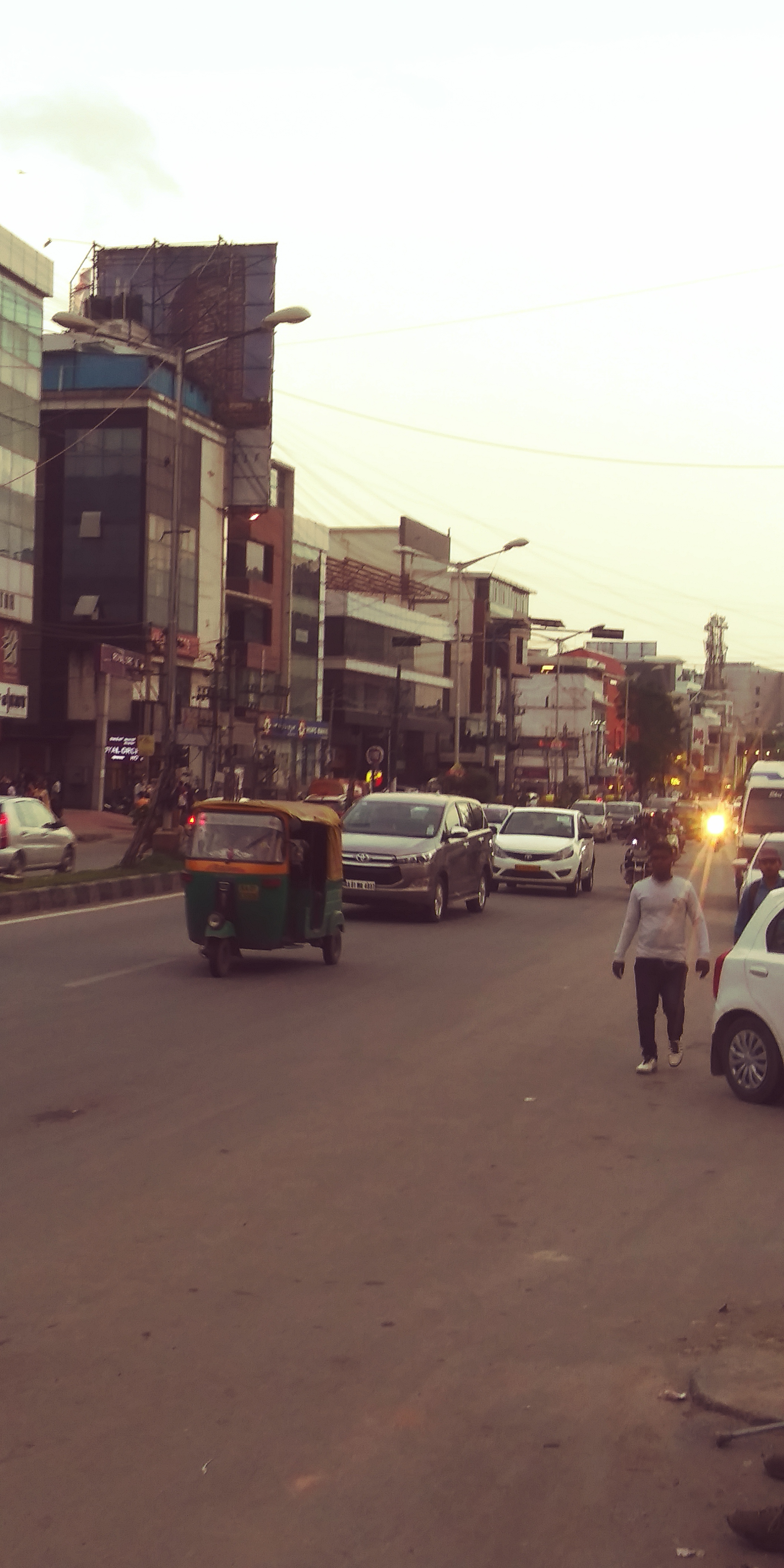
Intermediate Ring Road, Domlur

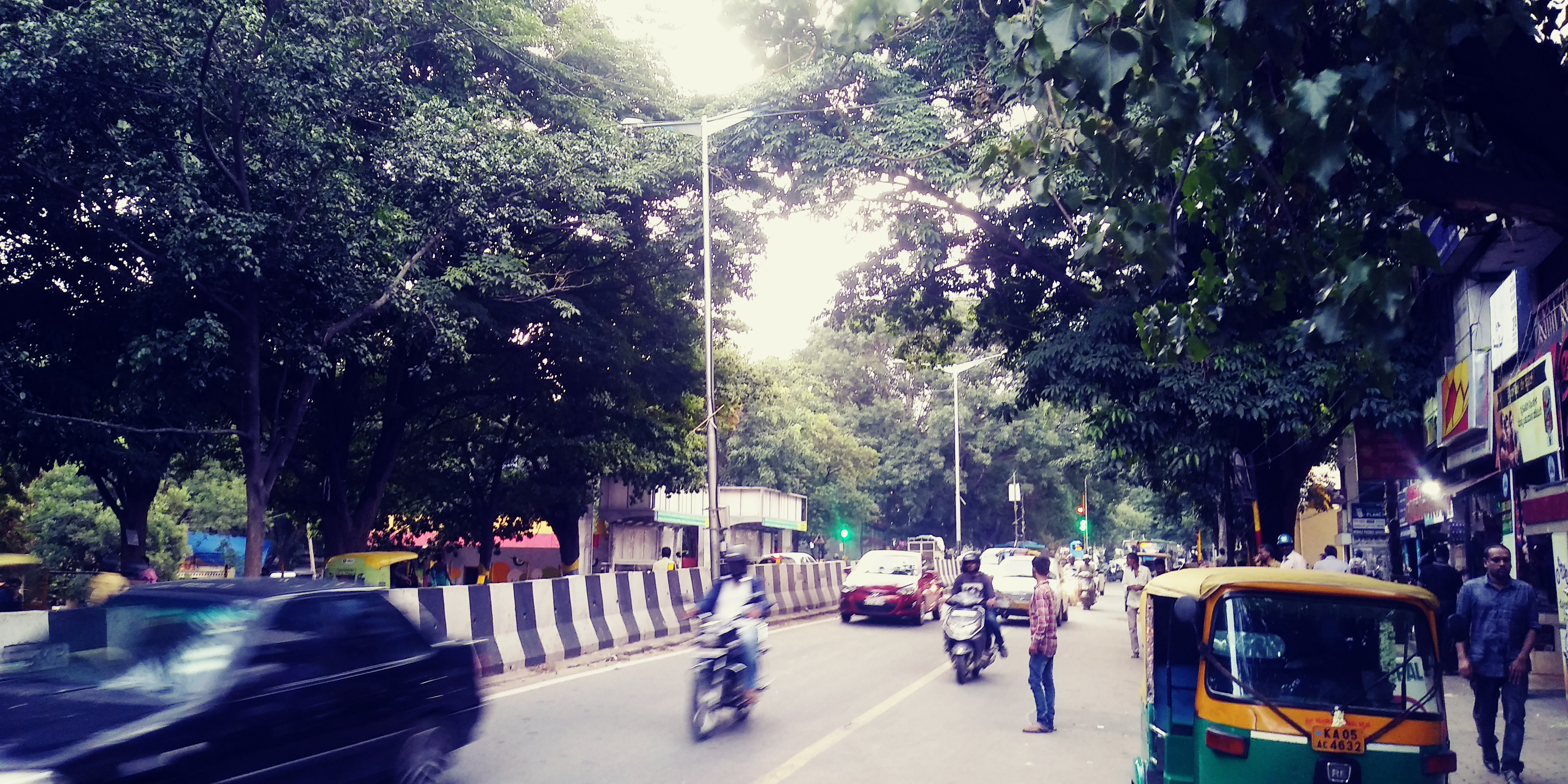
Old Airport Road, Domlur

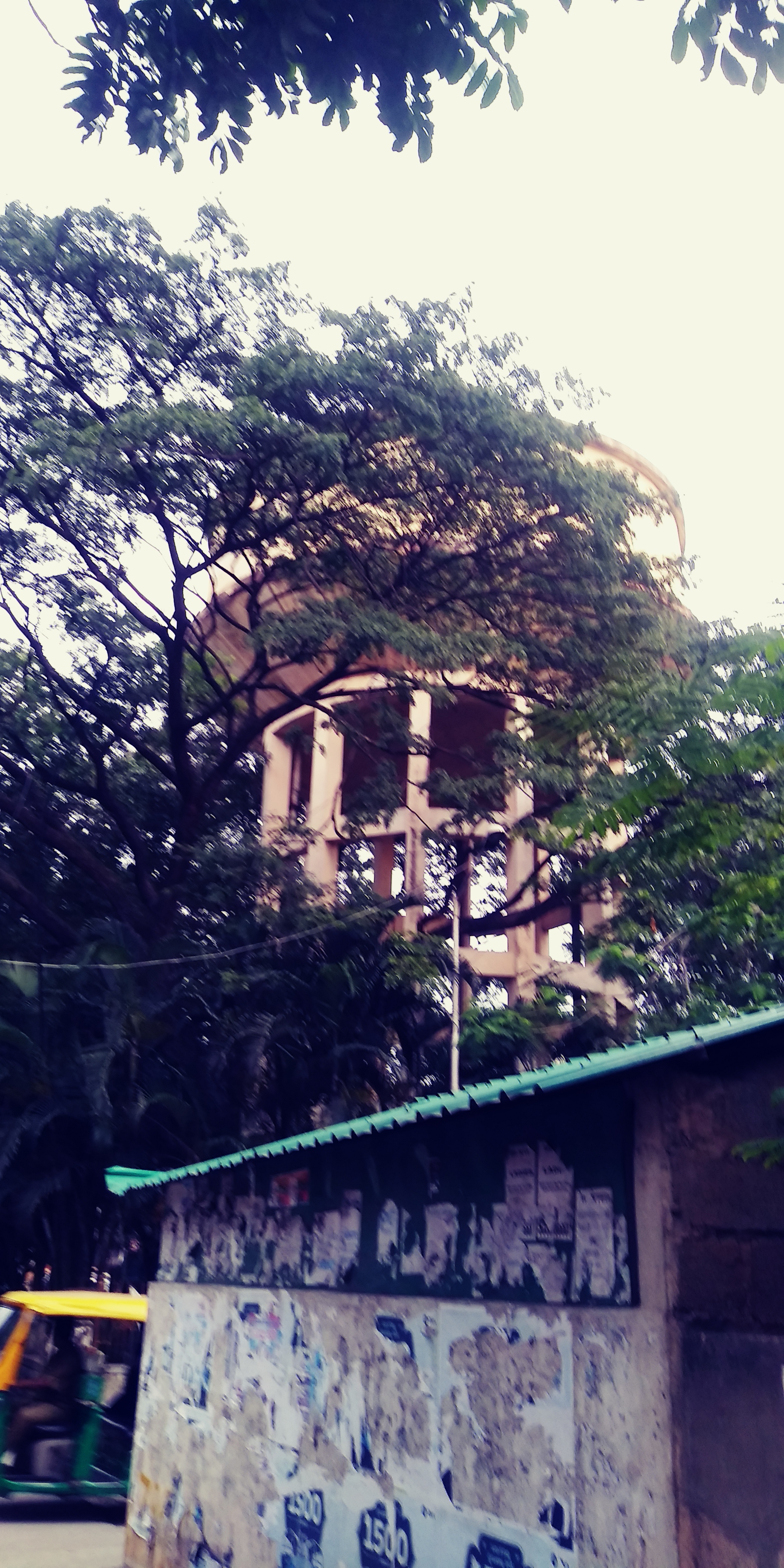
Domlur BWSSB Water Tank

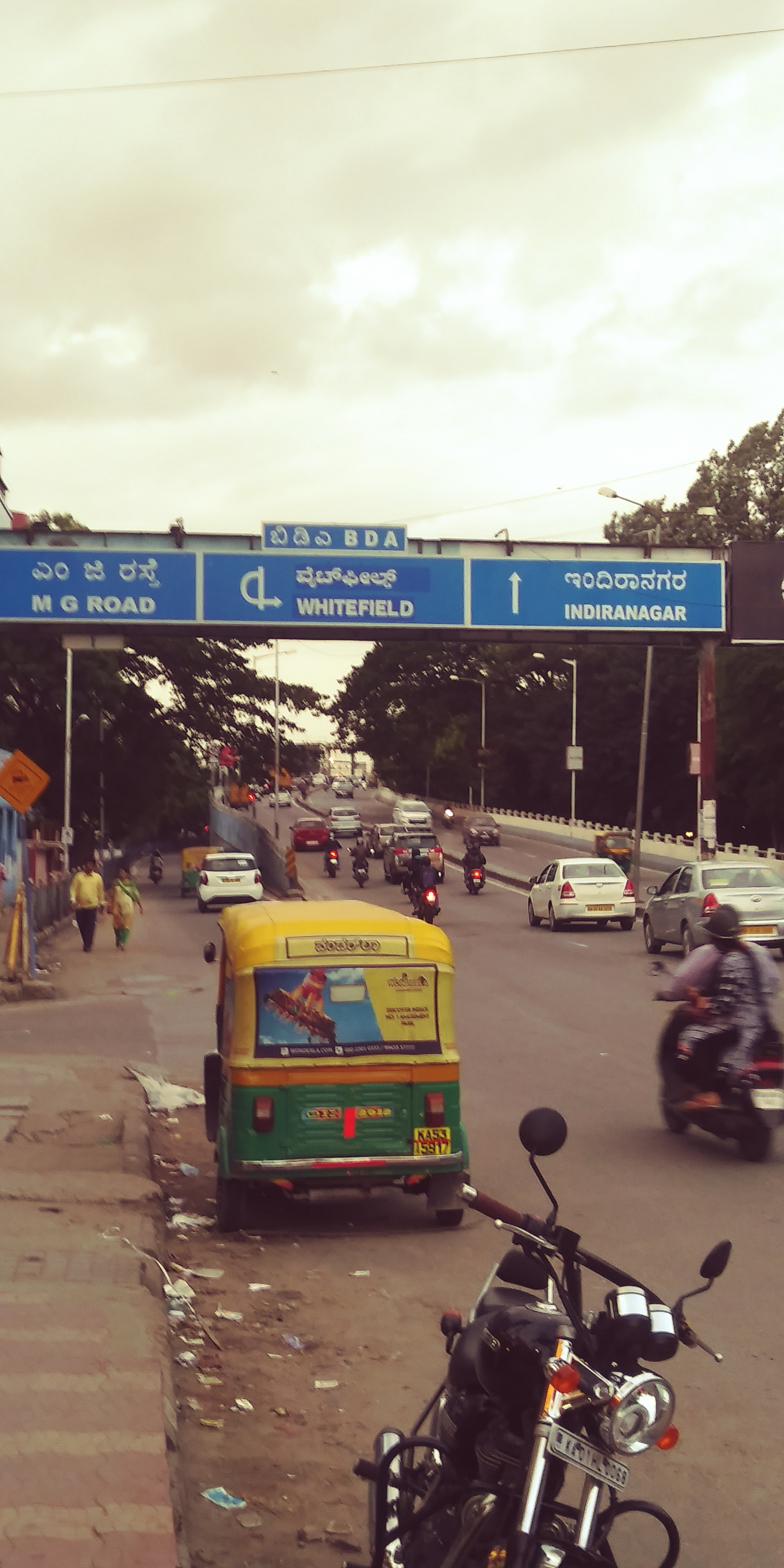
Domlur flyover towards Indiranagar
