= Bengaluru–Mysore Infrastructure Corridor =

Road in Karnataka, India

Bengaluru–Mysuru Infrastructure Corridor
- Nandi Infrastructure Corridor Enterprises Road
- NICE Peripheral Ring Road
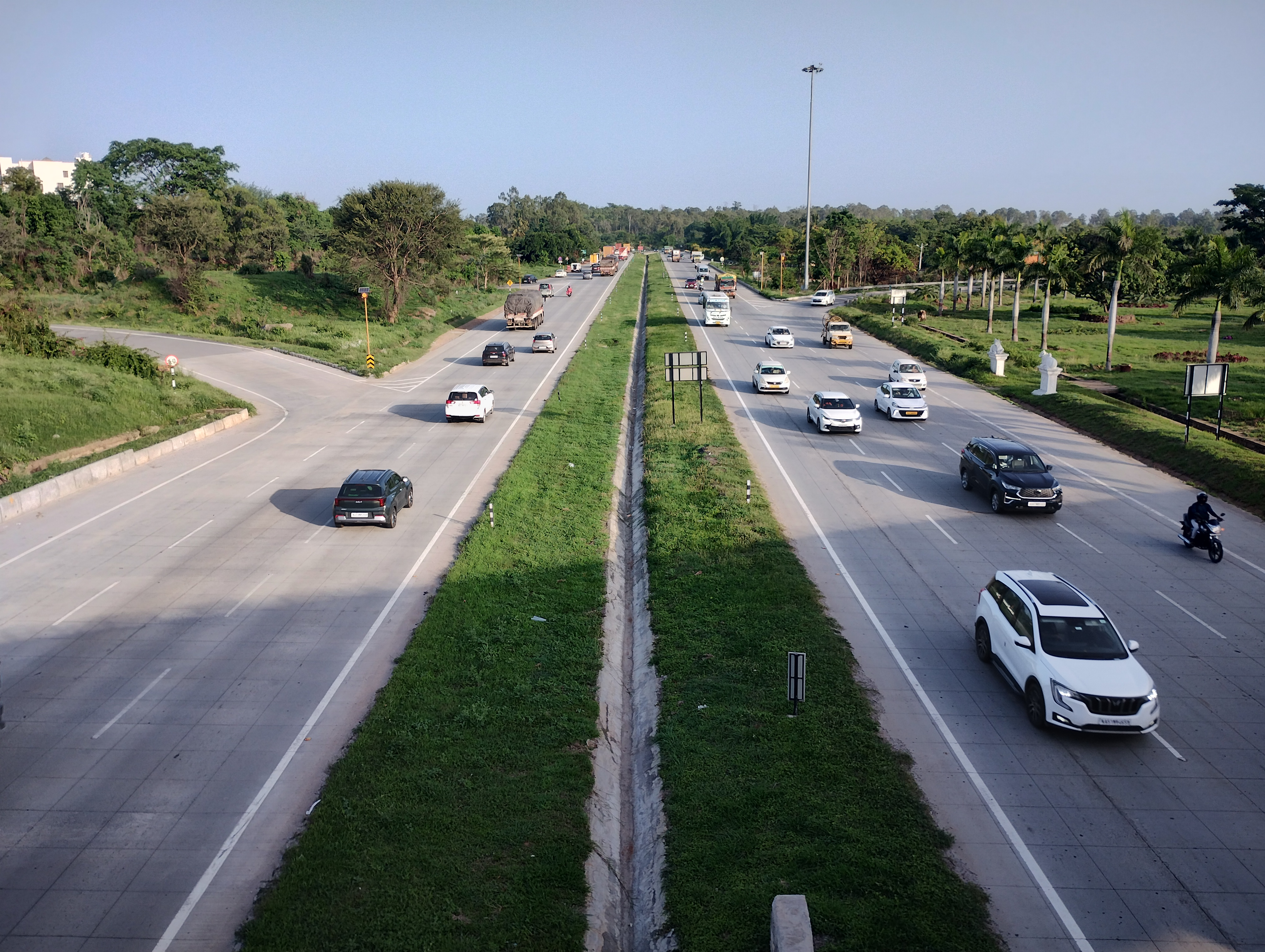
- NICE road at clover leaf junction, Somapura

Route information
- Maintained by Nandi Infrastructure Corridor Enterprises Road
- Length: 40 km (25 mi)
- Existed: 1996–present

Major junctions
- North end: Bengaluru
- Hosur Road junction at Electronic City; Bannerghatta Road junction at Gottigere; Kanakapura Road junction at Talaghattapura; Clover Leaf Intersection; Hosakerehalli junction near Nayandahalli; Mysuru Road junction at Kengeri; Magadi Road junction at Gollarahatti; Tumkur Road junction near BIEC
- South end: Mysuru

Location
- Country: India
- States: Karnataka

Highway system
- Roads in India; Expressways; National; State; Asian

The Nandi Infrastructure Corridor Enterprises Road, commonly known as NICE Road, is a partially implemented and largely scrapped 4 to 6 lane private tolled expressway in Karnataka, that was intended to connect the two important cities Bengaluru and Mysuru in the Indian state of Karnataka. It will not be implemented, as Bengaluru–Mysuru access-controlled Highway part of NH 275 is going to replace it as a section of the new Bengaluru–Mangaluru Industrial Corridor (EC-34).

As of May 2017, around 800,000 vehicles use the road daily on its presently operational section from Electronic City on Hosur Road to Tumakuru Road.

There has been accusation of irregularities in the execution of the Bangaluru Mysuru Infrastructure Corridor (BMIC) by the Nandi Infrastructure Corridor Enterprise (NICE).

== History ==
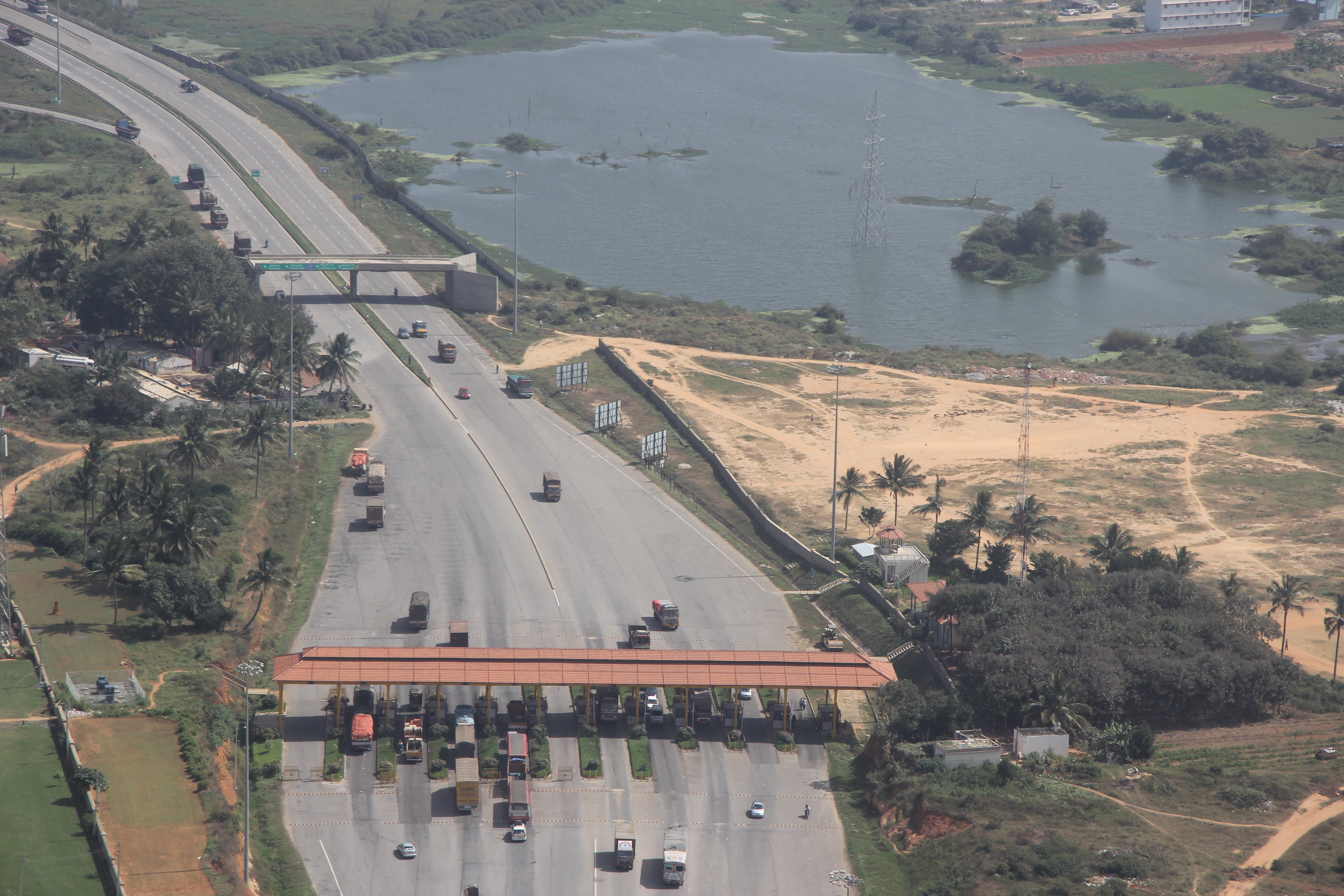
NICE Road toll plaza

In conjunction with a 1995 Trade Mission to India sponsored by the then Governor of Massachusetts, William Weld, a memorandum of understanding was signed by Consortium members, Indian officials, including then Karnataka Chief Minister, H. D. Deve Gowda, and U.S. officials, which set the stage for launching the Bengaluru Mysuru Infrastructure Corridor project. The Consortium, Nandi Infrastructure Corridor Enterprises (NICE), comprises the Kalyani Group of Companies, VHB International LTD. and SAB International LTD. to develop the Bengaluru Mysuru Infrastructure Corridor.

The project has been in controversy since the day of planning. In October 2012, the Karnataka Lokayukta ordered a probe into several former chief ministers in matters relating to irregularities in land acquisition for the project.

== Status updates ==
- Mar 2019: 4 km of expressway is completed, besides this 41 km of peripheral road and 8.5 km of link road is also constructed.

== Gallery ==
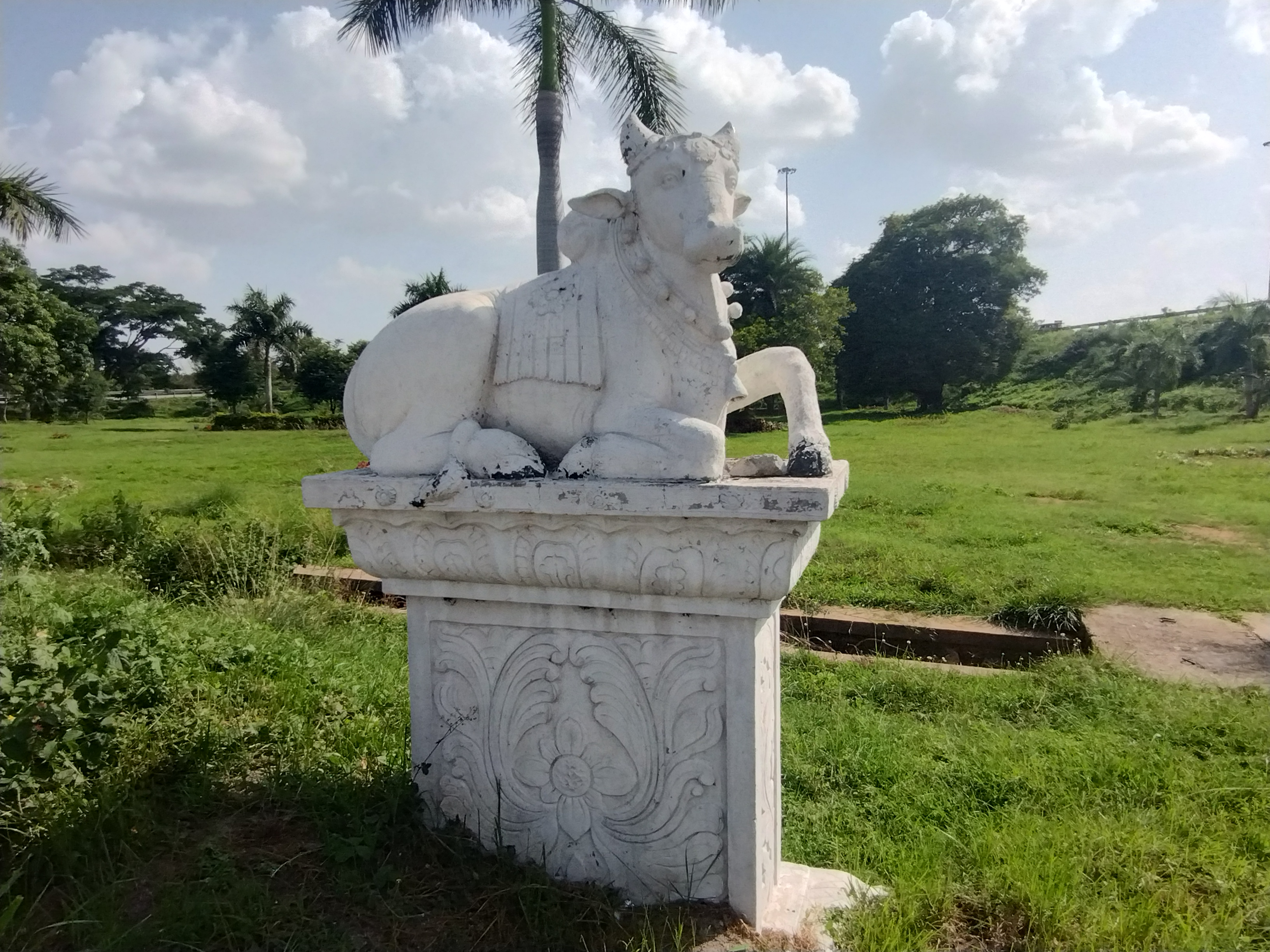
Nandi statue at clover leaf junction

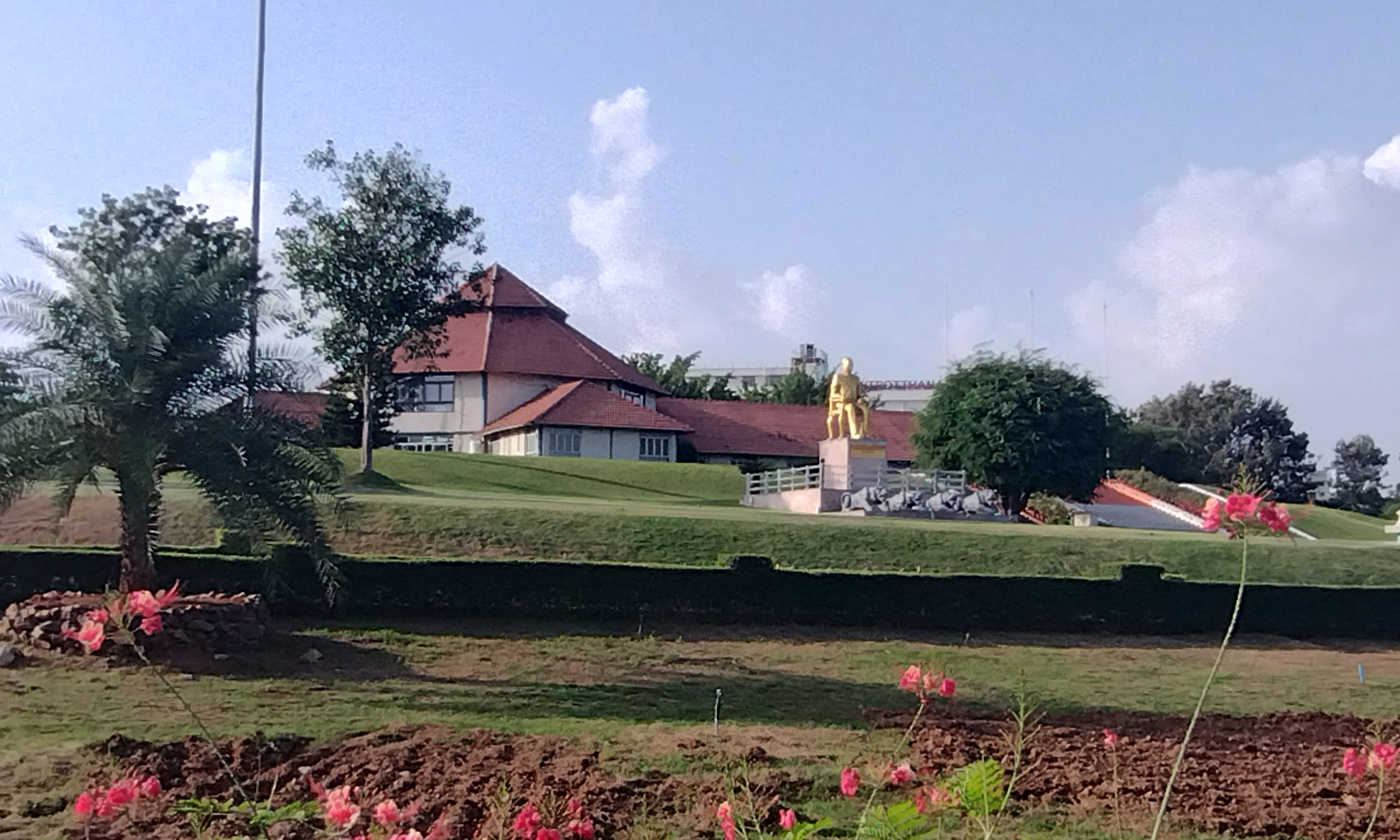
Nandi Economic Corridor Enterprises office at clover leaf junction

Video of NICE road at clover leaf junction

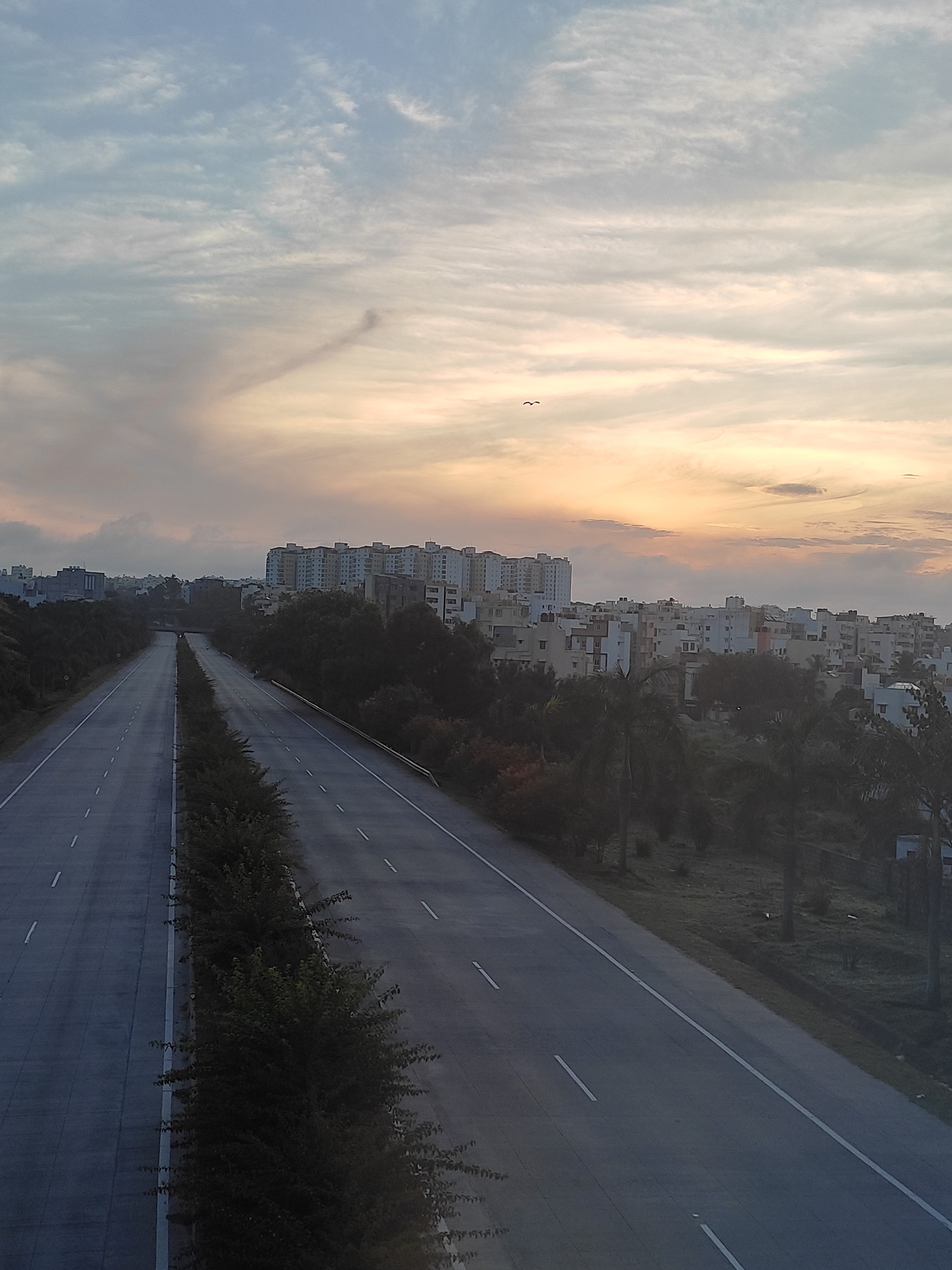
Sunrise at NICE road

== See also ==
- National Highway 275 (India)
- Expressways of India
- Infrastructure in Bengaluru
- Electronic City Elevated Expressway
- Inner Ring Road, Bengaluru
- Outer Ring Road, Bengaluru
- Peripheral Ring Road
- Satellite Town Ring Road
