= Machideva Jayanti =

Religious celebration

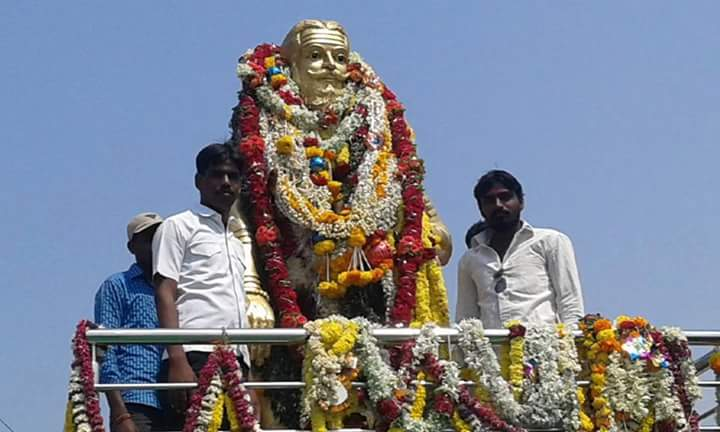
Garlanding Madivala Machideva's statue in Karnataka during the 2017 Machideva Jayanthi centenary

Machideva Jayanthi is traditionally observed by the Madivalas and is observed as a celebrate in the Indian state of Karnataka. It marks the birthday of Madivala Machideva, 12th-century Warrior-Saint, and the founding saint of the Madivala religion. The festival is celebrated with much pomp and gaiety all over south India, majorly in Karnataka, Maharashtra, Andhra Pradesh and Tamil Nadu.
