= Singasandra =

Village in Karnataka, India

Singasandra is a suburb of Bengaluru in the state of Karnataka, India, near Electronic City.
