= Peripheral Ring Road =

Proposed road around Bengaluru, India

Route information
- Length: 73 km (45 mi)

Major junctions
- North end: Tumkur Road
- South end: Hosur Road

Location
- Country: India
- States: Karnataka

Highway system
- Roads in India; Expressways; National; State; Asian

The Peripheral Ring Road (PRR), officially the Bengaluru Business Corridor (BBC) is a proposed 12-lane ring road that runs around Bengaluru, Karnataka. It will have 8-lane access-controlled main carriageway along with 2-lane service roads on both sides. It is located outside of Outer Ring Road, Bengaluru, which is a 60-kilometre-long road.

The PRR, covers 6 taluks and passes through 77 villages. The road will stretch from Tumakuru Road to Hosur Road, connect highways (State and National), NICE Road and pass through Old Madras Road.

It has 2 components PRR-1 and PRR-2. PRR-1 is a 73-km access-controlled expressway around east and northern parts of the Bengaluru. PRR-2 is in DPR stage, which may cover other half.

== History ==
The reason for creating the PRR was to decongest the Outer Ring Road which currently acts as a by-pass to the city with more than 10,000 trucks using it. According to BDA's project report, with the immense growth in intra-city traffic, the ORR is under tremendous pressure already. The city has already extended beyond the ORR which is a key factor in the increasing pressure on ORR.

To relieve the traffic pressure on the ORR and the major road networks of the city, a peripheral ring road (PRR) of 116 km was planned outside of the ORR. This stretch is planned to not only improve connectivity of areas beyond the ORR, but also ease the congestion on the ORR. The BDA is focused on the first phase of the project from Hosur Road to Tumakuru Road with a distance of 67 km.

In 2023, Urban Development Minister Byrathi Suresh said "The PRR is an essential project for Bengaluru as it holds the potential to decongest the city. Recognising the substantial investment required, we are exploring public–private partnership options to ensure the successful execution of this project." However concerns loomed over the possibility of another lack of bidders. In such a scenario, it had been speculated that the BDA may take up the construction of PRR itself.

While 1,810 acres were notified for acquisition in the final notification in 2007 for the Peripheral Ring Road project, the Bengaluru Development Authority barely managed to acquire 3.21 acres of land.

== See also ==
- Inner Ring Road, Bengaluru
- Outer Ring Road, Bengaluru
- NICE Road
- Satellite Town Ring Road
- Regional Ring Road
- List of longest ring roads
