= Inner Ring Road, Bengaluru =

First Ring Road of Bengaluru

Inner Ring Road
- 100 Feet Road
- Bengaluru Inner Ring Road highlighted in Red
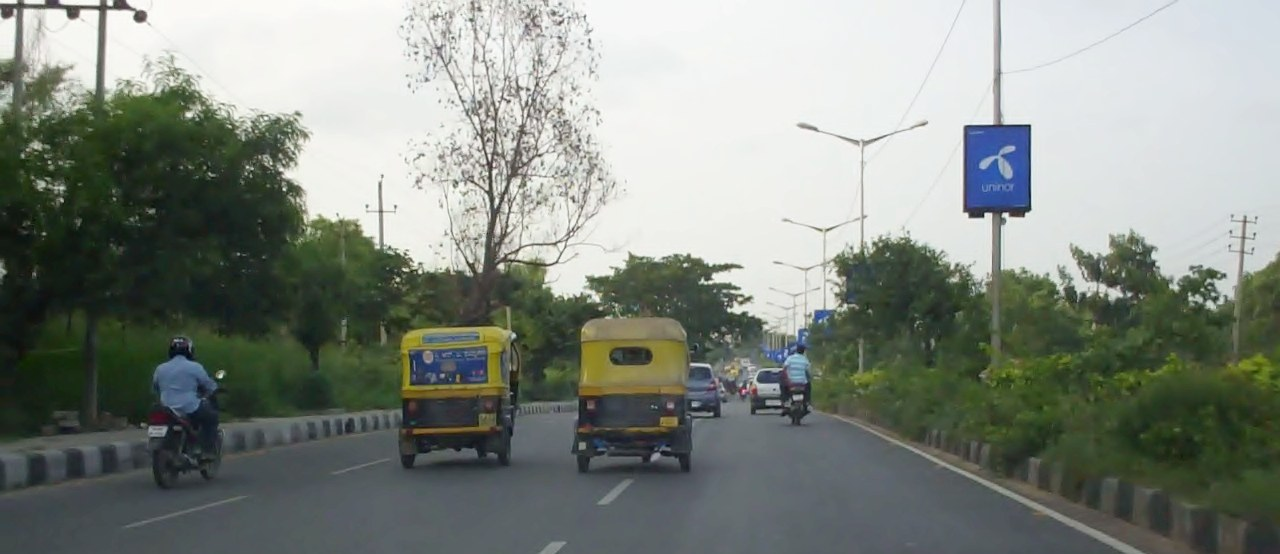

Route information
- Maintained by Bengaluru Development Authority, Bruhat Bengaluru Mahanagara Palike
- Length: 10 km (6.2 mi)

Location
- Country: India
- State: Karnataka

Highway system
- Roads in India; Expressways; National; State; Asian; State Highways in Karnataka

The Inner Ring Road is a major arterial road connecting Indiranagar and Koramangala. This road is an 8 lane access control highway with a 2 lane service road facility. The northern end of the road, beyond Old Airport Road from Domlur junction is called 100 Feet Road.

== Connections ==
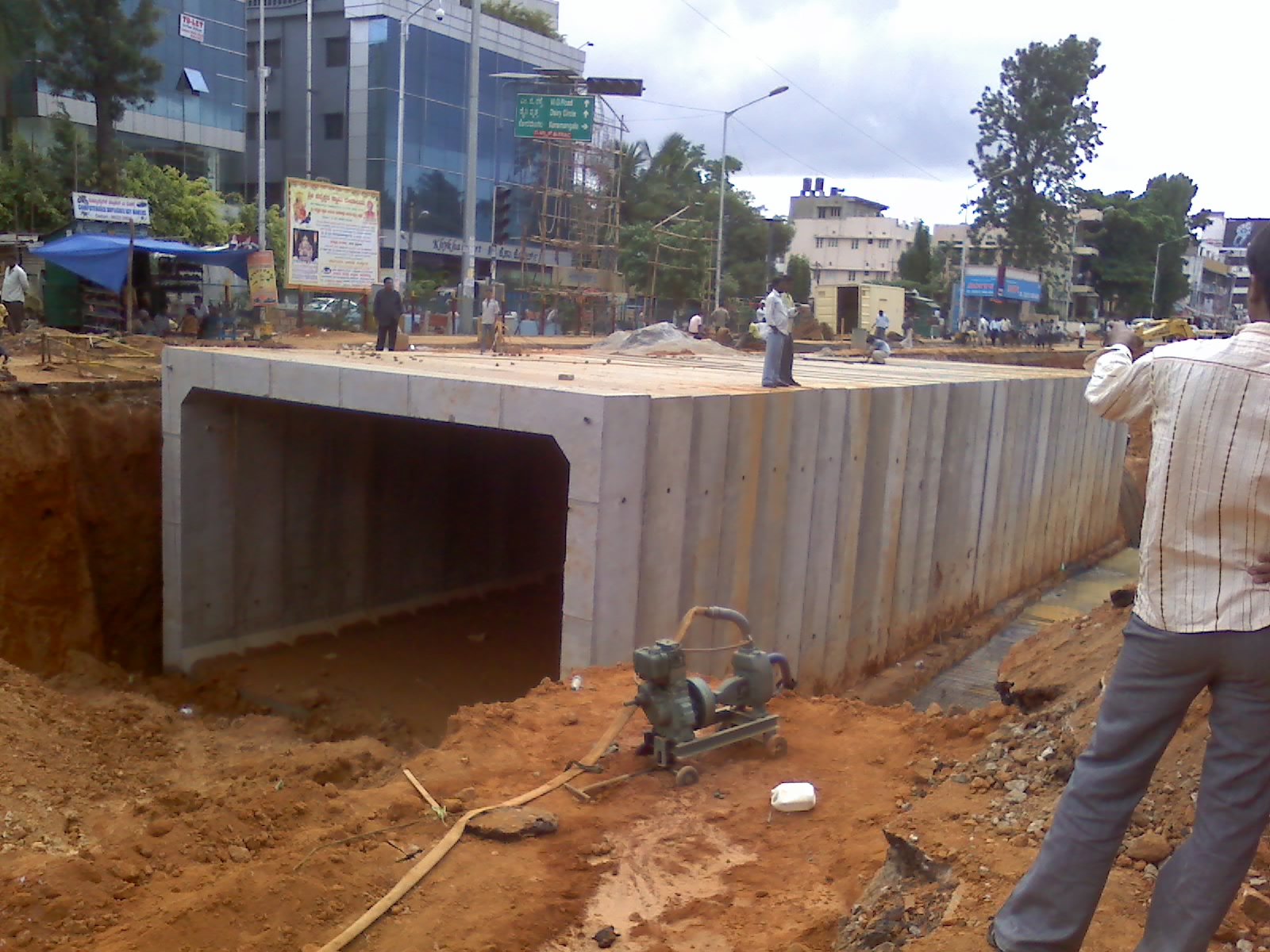
RCC Magic Box, used to build an underpass at Madiwala at the junction of Hosur Road and Inner Ring Road.

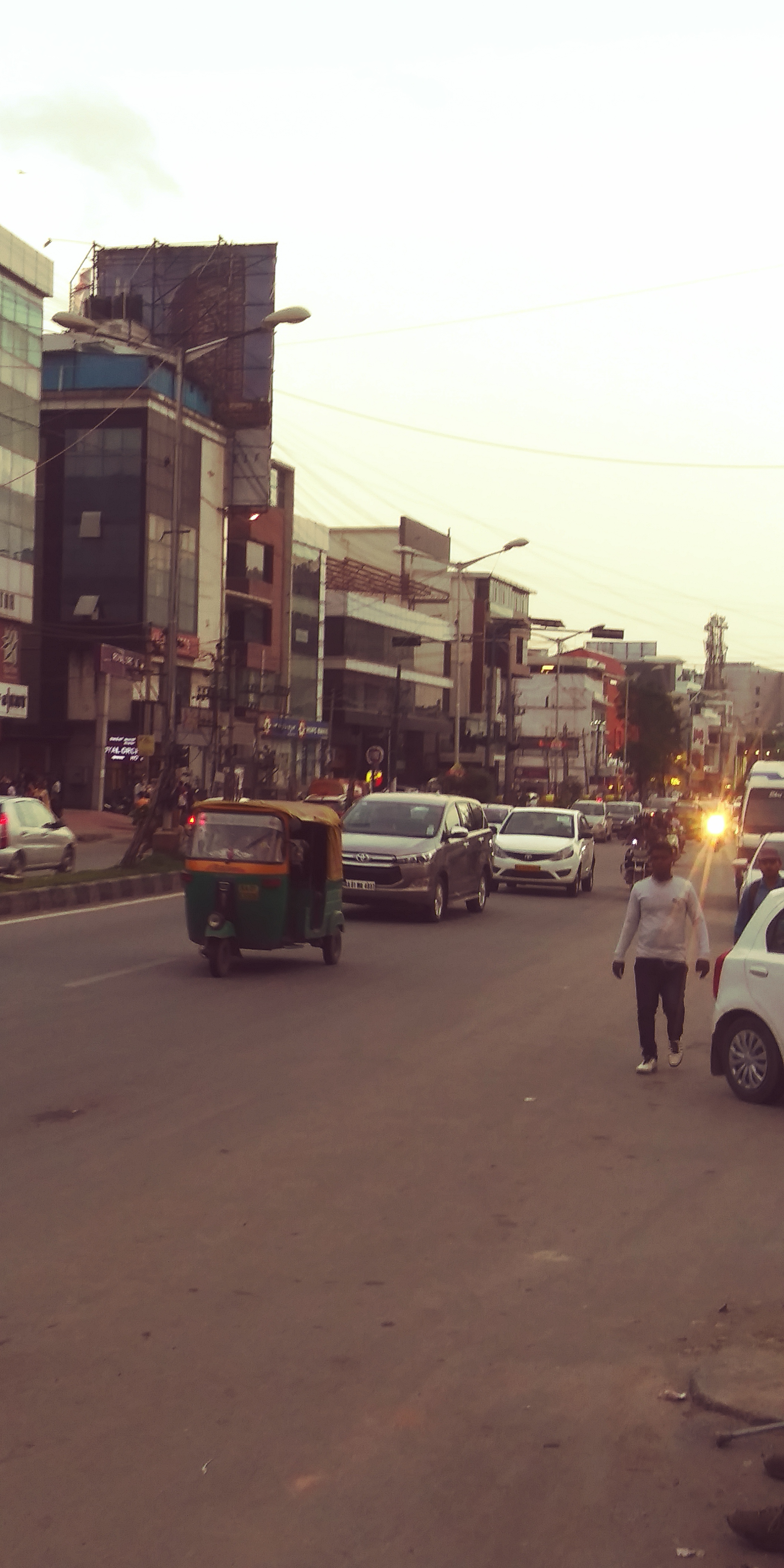
Intermediate Ring Road at Domlur

Several MNCs, such as IBM, Dell, Lenovo, Continuous Computing and Microsoft are located along this road. Other important companies in the IT industry also have their offices at the "Embassy Golf Links" just off the IRR close to HAL Airport.

The IRR forms an important link for the Information Technology Corridor, which extends through Whitefield , Old Airport Road, Koramangala and finally to Electronics City.

A big flyover has been constructed at the Domlur Junction of the IRR and Old Airport Road. It has helped in the decongestion of traffic at the Domlur signal.

Much of the land around the IRR is fenced barren defense land, which eliminates instances of people or animals crossing the road.

== See also ==
- Outer Ring Road, Bengaluru
- NICE Road
- Peripheral Ring Road
- Satellite Town Ring Road
