= Bommanahalli =

- suburb
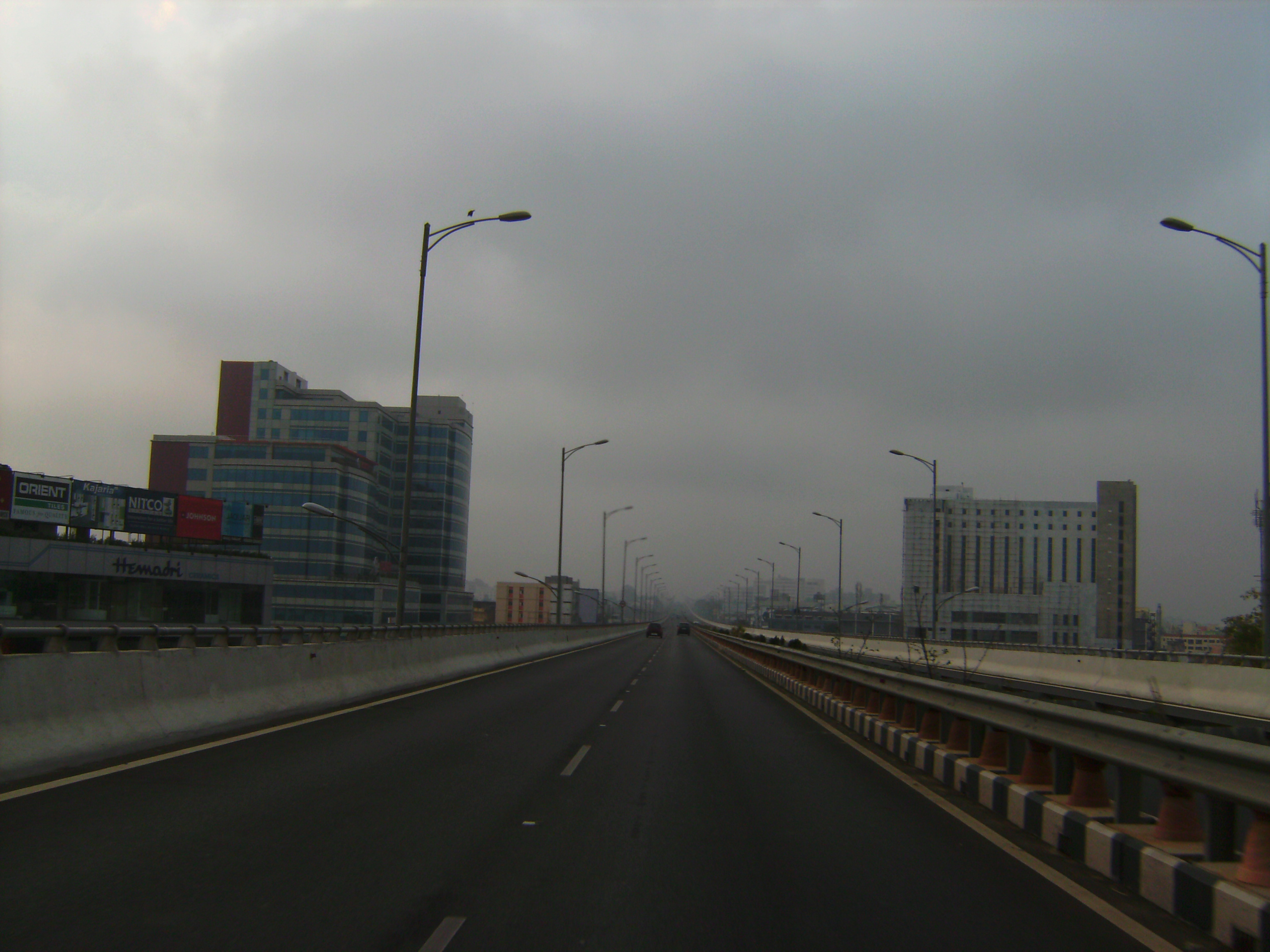
- View from Electronic City Elevated Expressway near Bommanahalli

- Location within Bengaluru
- Coordinates: 12.9°N 77.63°E
- Country: India
- State: Karnataka
- District: Bengaluru Urban
- Metro: Bengaluru

Population (2001)
  - Total: 201,220

Languages
  - Official: Kannada
- Time zone: UTC+5:30 (IST)
- PIN: 560068

Bommanahalli is a locality in Bengaluru and one of the zones of BBMP. It is located adjacent to Hosur Road National Highway 44 (India) in India and is proximate to the IT hub Electronics City.

Two of The Oxford Educational Institutions are located in Bommanahalli, the Oxford College of Engineering and the Oxford Dental College, Hospital and Research Center.

Residents of Bommanahalli tend not to be connected to Bengaluru's water supply network and are dependent on tanker trucks and wells for water.
