= Satellite Town Ring Road =

Road in Bangalore, India

National Highway 948A
- Dabaspet - Ramanagara - Hosur Expressway

Location
- Country: India

Highway system
- Roads in India; Expressways; National; State; Asian

National Highway 648
- Dabaspet - Devanahalli - Hosur Expressway

Route information

Major junctions
- West end: Dobbaspet
- East end: Hosur

Location
- Country: India
- States: Karnataka, Tamil Nadu

Highway system
- Roads in India; Expressways; National; State; Asian

Satellite Town Ring Road: (STRR, NH 948A and NH 648) is a 280.8-kilometre (174.5 mi) ring road under construction around Bengaluru city, the capital of Karnataka state in India. This road passing through Dabaspet, Dodda Belavangala, Doddaballapur, Devanahalli, Vijayapura, Nandagudi, Malur, Sathyamangala, Perandapalli (Hosur), Beragapalli, Thalli, Dodda Maralavadi, Kanakapura, Ramanagara, Magadi, Sarjapur and Solur these 18 towns connected. This road 4 lanes highway and 2 lanes service road (some part) facility provided. The project is being developed by the National Highways Authority of India (NHAI) under Bharatmala Pariyojana. The entire STRR project involves a length of 367 kilometres (228 mi) around Bengaluru that will connect the eight major satellite towns. Of this, NHAI will build 240 kilometres (150 mi) of expressway.

The NHAI is targeting to complete the first phase, involving the 82-kilometre (51 mi) stretch between Dobbspet and Ramanagara, in about three years. Another 30-kilometre (19 mi) stretch between Dobbespet and Magadi is being built under K-SHIP.

The NHAI has divided the STRR project into three phases, said RK Suryawanshi, regional officer at NHAI, Bengaluru. The NHAI, he said, would take up Phase III ahead of Phase II. The second phase would be taken up next year. Another NHAI official said the 56-km Phase II has been kept on hold as it passes through the boundaries of eco-sensitive Bannerghatta National Park.

The 80 km stretch of Dabaspete-Hoskote section of National Highway 648, also being a part of the STRR was inaugurated on 11 March 2024.

== Project updates ==
The Ministry of Environment, Forest and Climate Change (MoEF&CC) has accorded terms of reference (ToR) for development of Satellite Town Ring Road (STRR) Phase-I.

The project envisages development of STRR Phase-I of NH-948A from Dobbaspete to Ramanagara (0.000 km to 82.200 km) 82.20 km in Ramanagara District, Karnataka.

S&P Infrastructure Developers – Skylark Infra Engineering JV Wins Bengaluru Satellite Town Ring Road's Package 2.

== See also ==
- Inner Ring Road, Bengaluru
- Outer Ring Road, Bengaluru
- NICE Road
- Peripheral Ring Road
- Regional Ring Road, Hyderabad
- List of longest ring roads
