= BTM Layout =

- Locality
- Location within Bengaluru
- Coordinates: 12°55′30″N 77°36′31″E
- Country: India
- State: Karnataka
- City: Bengaluru

Languages
  - Official: Kannada
- Time zone: UTC+5:30 (IST)
- PIN: 560029; 560068; 560076
- Vehicle registration: KA-05 (1st Stage); KA-51(2nd to 6th Stages)

BTM Layout, an abbreviation of Byrasandra, Tavarekere and Madiwala Layout is a locality in Bengaluru, Karnataka, India located in the South and Southeast parts of the city between Hosur Road and Bannerghatta Road. It is one of the first layouts in Bangalore.

== Location ==
The area is around 45 km away from Kempegowda International Airport and 11 km away from the KSR Bengaluru. BTM Layout's proximity to Bengaluru Outer Ring Road, Koramangala, HSR Layout, Bannerghatta Road, J P Nagara and Jayanagara makes it one of the most popular residential and commercial places in Bengaluru. The 1st Stage of BTM Layout is separated from the 2nd-6th Stages, by the Outer Ring Road. BTM Layout is noted for its cafes, boutiques and music venues.

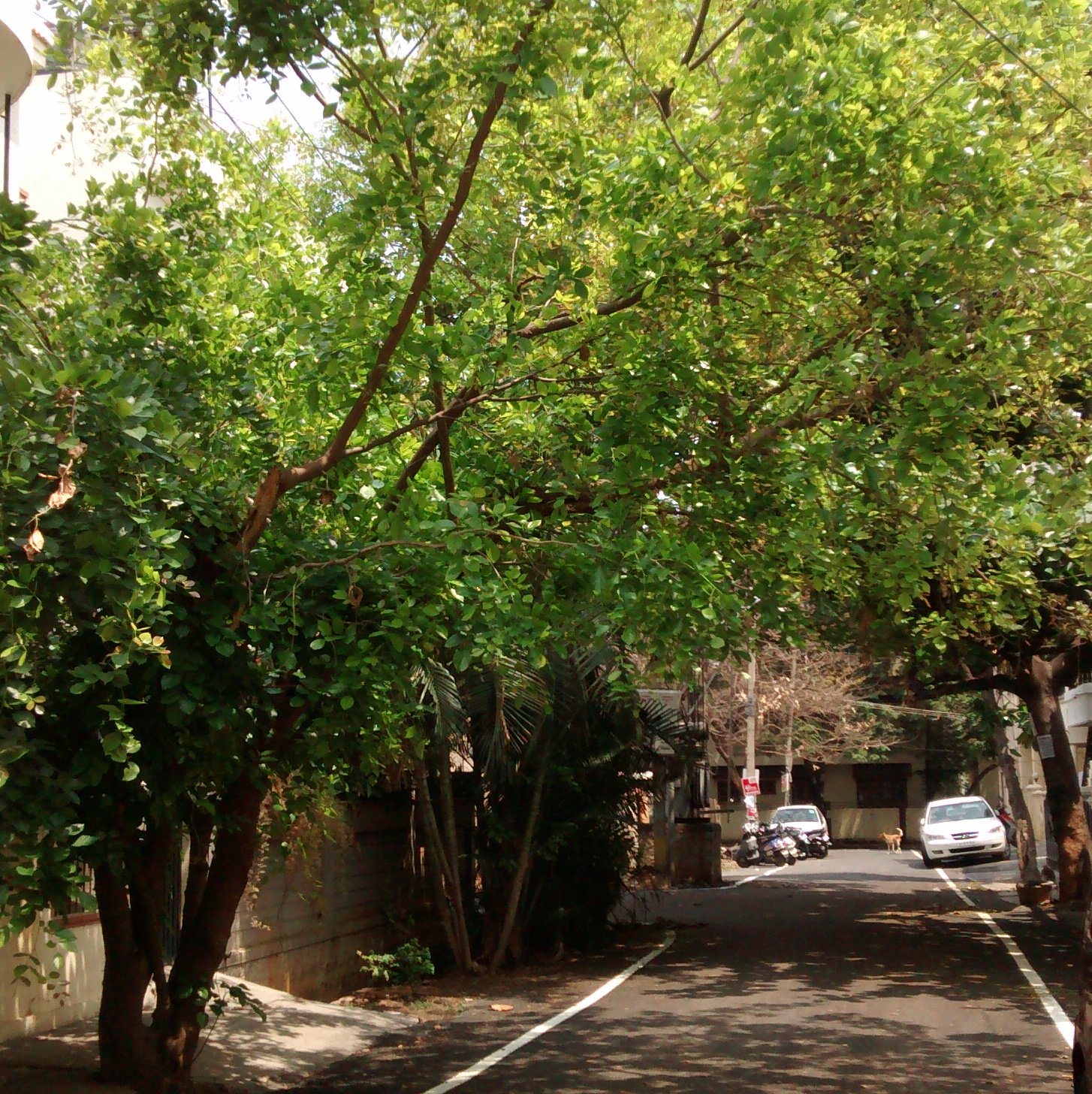
A street in a residential part of BTM Layout

== Economy ==
It is one of the high growth neighbourhoods in terms of property prices, showing an annual growth rate of close to 60% in early 2010.

Nearby tourist attractions include Bannerghatta National Park which is approximately 10 km away. Bannerghatta Butterfly Park which is located adjacent to the Bannerghatta National Park and is open on almost every day. The park is spread over an area of 7.5 acres with a butterfly trail of about a kilometer length. The ‘butterfly trail’ established over a five-acre garden leads the visitors to an innovatively designed three dome structure housing the conservatory, museum and the multi-media center Madiwala Lake which is home to rare bird species, is also famous in the neighborhood.

Also home to BTM Football Club (BTMFC) which plays A division football in Karnataka league.

== Location ==
Line 43: It is one of the high growth neighbourhoods in terms of property prices, showing an annual growth rate of close to 60% in early 2010.

Nearby tourist attractions include Bannerghatta National Park which is approximately 10 km away. Bannerghatta Butterfly Park which is located adjacent to the Bannerghatta National Park and is open on almost every day. The park is spread over an area of 7.5 acres with a butterfly trail of about a kilometer length. The ‘butterfly trail’ established over a five-acre garden leads the visitors to an innovatively designed three dome structure housing the conservatory, museum and the multi-media center Madiwala Lake which is home to rare bird species, is also famous in the neighborhood.

Also home to BTM Football Club (BTMFC) which plays A division football in Karnataka league. Madiwala Lake which is home to rare bird species, is also famous in the neighborhood. Also home to BTM Football Club (BTMFC) which plays A division football in Karnataka league.

== Nearby educational institutions ==
- Oxford college of engineering and dental college
- St. Thomas Aquinas High School (Oldest school in BTM Layout)
- AECS Maaruti College Of Dental Science And Research Center
- Buddha Education Society PU college
- Bhudha School
- Alliance University
- Indian Institute of Management Bangalore
- Ekya School
- MES School and First Grade College
- Shanthiniketan Educational Trust and MES PU College
- St. Miras High School
- OLF High School
- Nightingales English High School
- New. St Florence Public Convent and High
- Christ university and school
- Orchid International School
- Vibgyor High
- Networking Training Institute
