= Outer Ring Road, Bengaluru =

Road in Karnataka, India

Coordinates: 12.924763°N 77.68158°E

Outer Ring Road
- Bengaluru Outer Ring Road (ORR) highlighted in Red
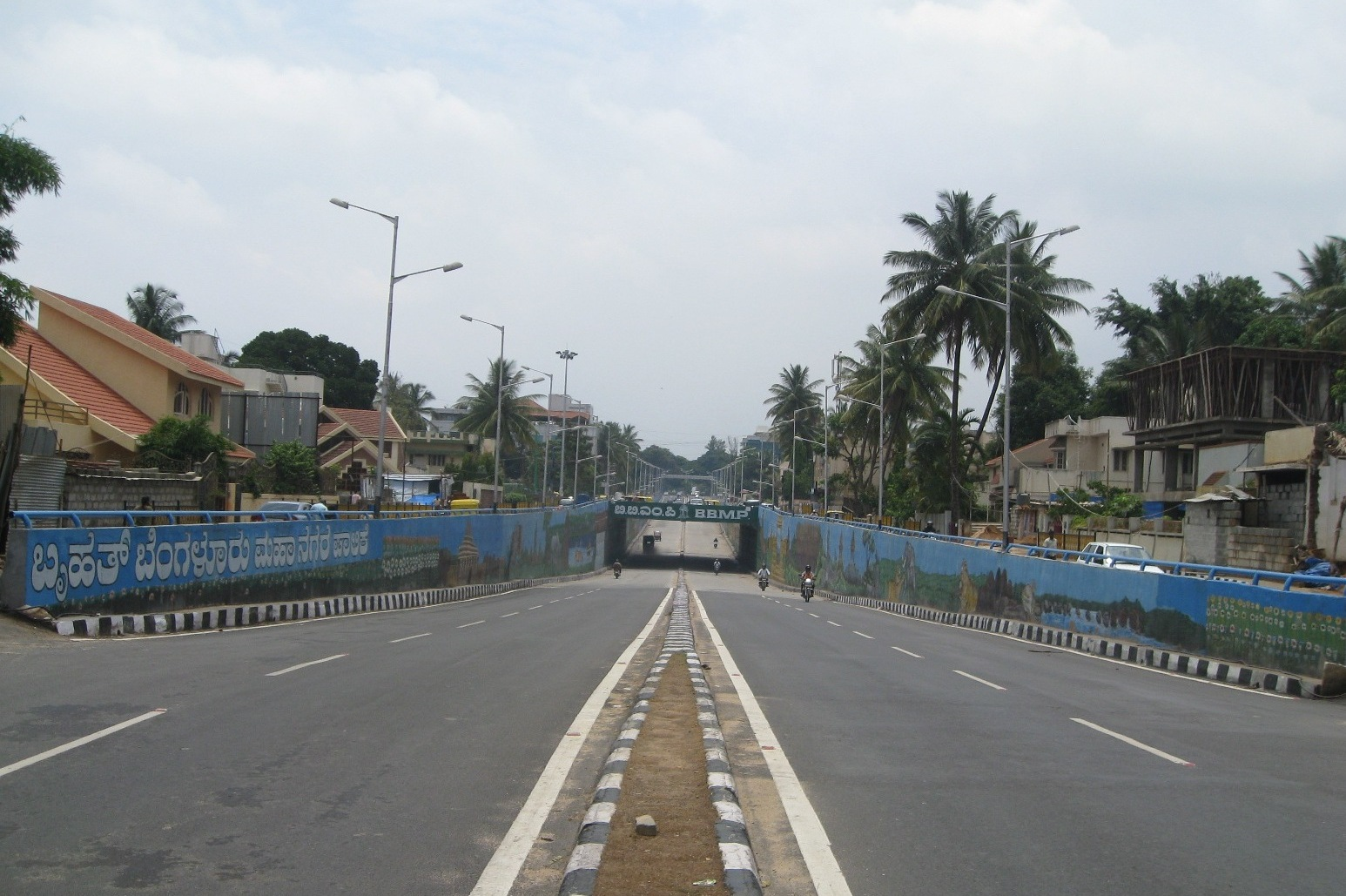
- An underpass at a section of Outer Ring Road in JP Nagar

Route information
- Maintained by Bengaluru Development Authority (BDA), Bruhat Bengaluru Mahanagara Palike (BBMP)
- Length: 60 km (37 mi)
- Existed: 1996–present

Major junctions
- Tumakuru Road (NH 48); Airport Road (NH 44); Old Madras Road (NH 75); Hosur Road (NH 44); Bannerghatta Road (SH 87); Kanakapura Road (NH 948); Mysuru Road (NH 275); Magadi Road (SH 85)

Location
- Country: India
- State: Karnataka

Highway system
- Roads in India; Expressways; National; State; Asian; State Highways in Karnataka

The Outer Ring Road (ORR) is a ring road that runs around most of the perimeter of the city of Bengaluru, Karnataka, India. This 60-kilometre-long (37 mi) road was developed by the Bengaluru Development Authority and different sections were opened progressively between 1996 and 2002. IT firms on the Outer Ring Road generate revenue of US$ 22 billion every year, accounting for 32% of Bengaluru’s total IT revenue.

The Outer Ring Road connects all major highways around the city – Tumakuru Road (NH 48), Airport Road (NH 44), Old Madras Road (NH 75), Hosur Road (NH 44), Bannerghatta Road (SH 87), Kanakapura Road (NH 948), Mysuru Road (NH 275) and Magadi Road (SH 85). It passes through major neighborhoods and suburbs such as Hebbala, Banaswadi, Krishnarajapura, Mahadevapura, Marathahalli, HSR Layout, Madiwala, BTM Layout, JP Nagar, Banashankari, Kengeri, Bengaluru University, Nagarbhavi, Nandini Layout, Kengeri Satellite Town and Gokula.

Initially conceived to keep the truck traffic out of downtown Bengaluru, the city has outgrown the Outer Ring Road. Nandi Infrastructure Corporation Limited has almost completed another partial ring road around Bengaluru as a part of the Bengaluru–Mysuru Infrastructure Corridor (BMIC) project. The BDA and BMRDA have planned three more ring roads beyond the existing ring road. The first of these, the Peripheral Ring Road (PRR) will run a few kilometres beyond the BMIC-PRR. The second and third of these will be known as the Intermediate Ring Road (IRR) and the Satellite Towns Ring Road (STRR) respectively.

== See also ==
- Inner Ring Road, Bengaluru
- NICE Road
- Peripheral Ring Road
- Satellite Town Ring Road
