= Hosur Road =

Road in Bengaluru, India

Coordinates: 12.874171°N 77.650409°E

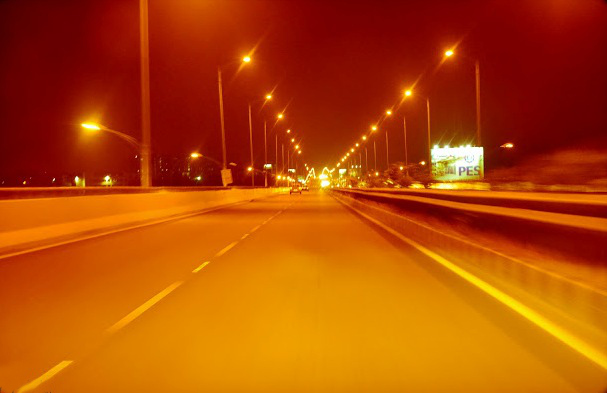

Route information
- Maintained by NHAI, BBMP, BDA
- Length: 32 km (20 mi)

Major junctions
- North end: Brigade Road
- Outer Ring Road, Bannerghatta Road
- South end: Attibele, Anekal Taluk.

Location
- Country: India
- States: Karnataka

Highway system
- Roads in India; Expressways; National; State; Asian

Hosur Road is the part of National Highway 48, erstwhile NH44, which connects metropolis Bengaluru and industrial City Hosur. It is a four to eight-lane access controlled highway. The road is part of the National Highway network.

The National Highways Authority of India has constructed a 10-kilometer-long elevated highway from Madiwala to Electronic City. The Bruhat Bengaluru Mahanagara Palike and Bangalore Development Authority have planned a series of flyovers and underpasses to make this arterial road signal free. The project is a part of the BETL (Bangalore Elevated Tollways Ltd), project as part of the National Highways Development Project and the Elevated Highways Project. It was initiated in early 2006, and was inaugurated on 22 January 2010. It starts from Bommanahalli after the Central Silk Board flyover and goes on up to Electronic City. It goes above the BMIC flyover on Hosur Road, at a height of 17 meters (56 ft), thus making it, Bangalore's tallest flyover.

== See also ==
- NICE Road
- Outer Ring Road, Bengaluru
- Inner Ring Road, Bengaluru
