= Electronic City =

Suburb of Bengaluru, India

- Industrial Township
- KEONICS Electronic City
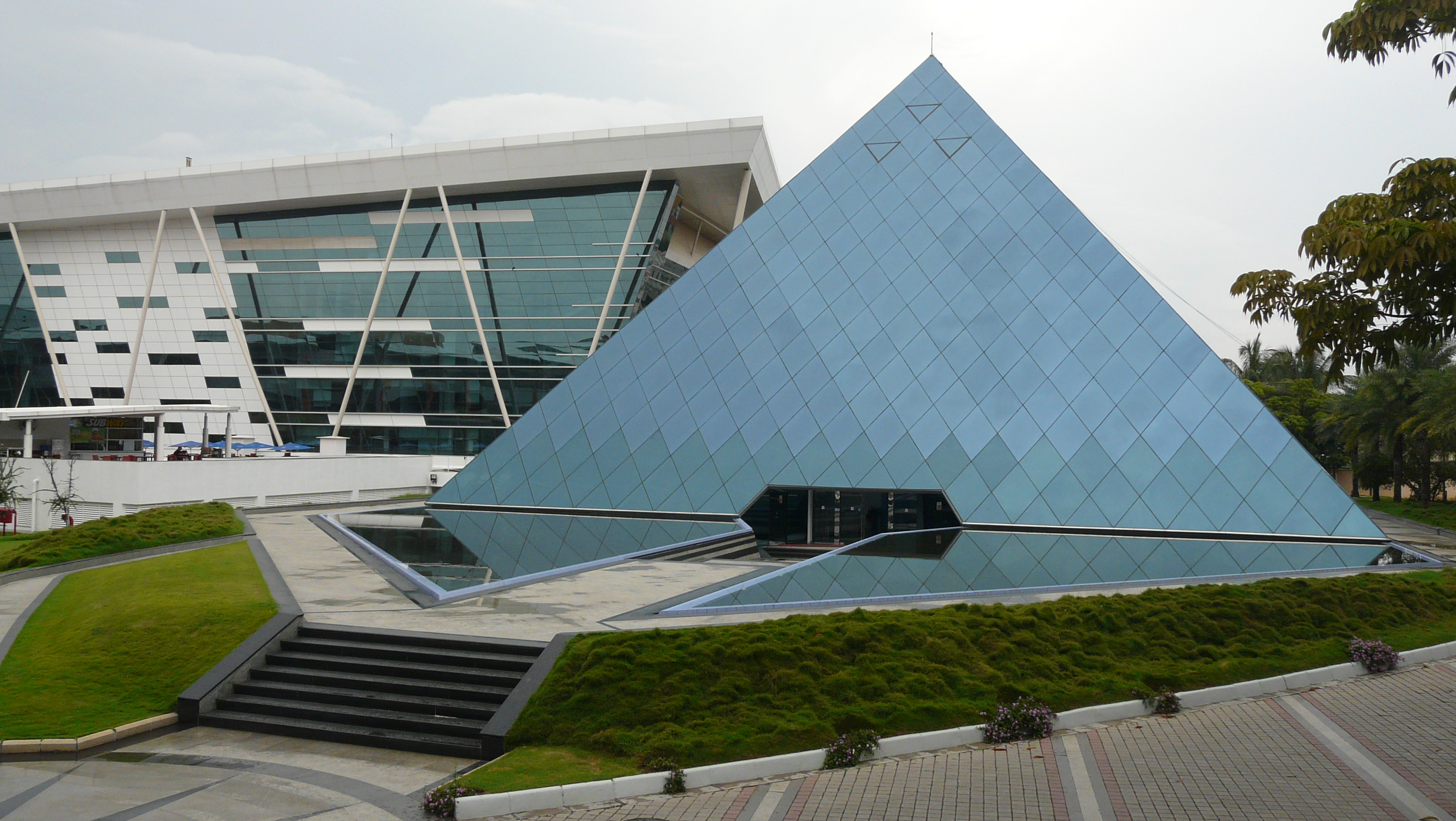
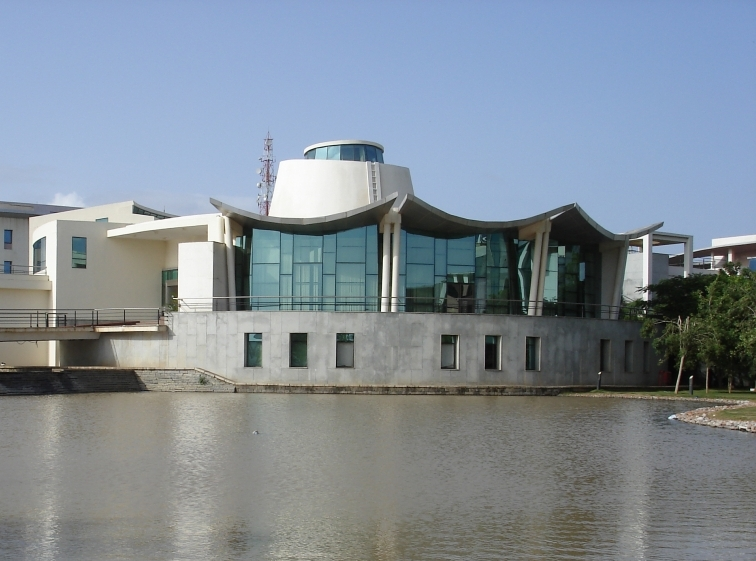
- Nickname: E-City
- Location within Bengaluru
- Coordinates: 12.85°N 77.67°E
- Country: India
- State: Karnataka
- District: Bangalore Urban
- Established: 1978
- Founder: R K Baliga

Government
  - Type: Industrial Township: Autonomous Members-led Industrial Township; Residential Areas: Town Panchayat and Town Municipal Council
  - Body: Collection of Membership fees and Maintenance of infrastructure in the industrial township: Electronics City Industrial Township Authority (ELCITA); Collection of Taxes and Municipal Services to surrounding Residential Areas: Doddathoguru Town Panchayat and Konappana Agrahara Town Municipal Council

Area
  - Total: 3.23749 km^{2} (1.25000 sq mi)
- Elevation 3015: 919 m (3,015 ft)

Languages
  - Official: Kannada
- Time zone: UTC+5:30 (IST)
- Postal codes: 560099,560100,562107
- ISO 3166 code: IN-KA
- Vehicle registration: KA-51
- Website: www.electronic-city.in

Electronic City
- Founded: 1978
- Location: Hosur Road, Karnataka
- Surface area: 800 acres (320 ha)
- Industry: Electronics, Information Technology
- Major companies: Infosys, Wipro, BHEL, Tech Mahindra, Hewlett-Packard, HCL Technologies, Tata Consultancy Services, CGI, Siemens, Continental, Genpact,Bosch
- Employees: 100,000
- Total investments: US$ 2,000,000

Electronic City is an information technology hub in Bengaluru, India, located in Anekal taluk. Spread over 800 acres (3.2 km²) near Konappana Agrahara and Doddathogur it houses a large number of electronic/IT industrial parks.

Electronic City was established by KEONICS (Karnataka State Electronics Development Corporation), and consists of four zones called phases – Phase I, Phase II, Phase III and Phase IV. There are approximately 200 IT/ITES company campuses located in Electronic City, including main campuses of Infosys, Wipro, TCS, HCL, Tech Mahindra and Biocon.

== History ==
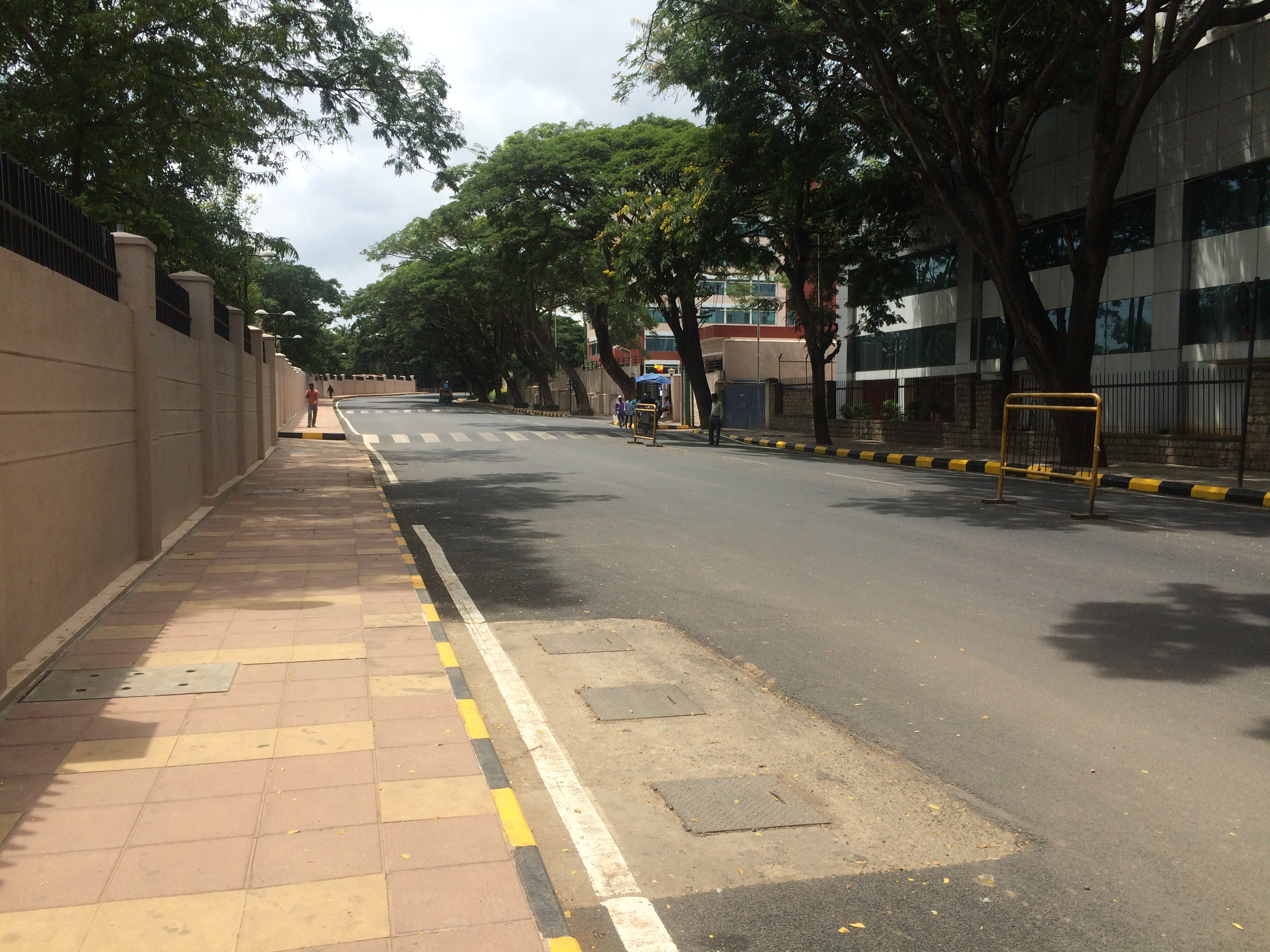
A street in Electronic City Phase 1

Electronic City was the brainchild of R. K. Baliga, the first Chairman and Managing Director of Keonics, Karnataka Electronic. He dreamt of making Bengaluru the Silicon Valley of India when he developed the concept of Electronic City. In 1978, Keonics established Electronic City on 332 acres of land in Konappana Agrahara and Doddathogur villages. The liberalisation of the Indian economy in the early 1990s by the then Indian Prime Minister P.V. Narasimha Rao and then Indian Finance Minister Dr. Manmohan Singh helped Electronic City to become what it is today — the outsourcing capital of the world.

In 1997, the maintenance and upkeep of Electronic City was handed over by Keonics to ELCITA, the Electronic City Township Industries Association, with representatives from units in the enclave, for effective local governance and management. Security is provided by ELCITA, who have deployed around 500 security officials and also installed CCTV cameras on strategic locations. On 18 March 2013, a notification by the Urban Development Department brought Electronic City Phases I, II, III under the E-City Industrial Township Area. Some residential area within Electronic City are still under the governance of City Panchayats and awaiting BBMP inclusion for want of civic amenities.

== Connectivity and transport ==
Electronic City has developed infrastructure in terms of connectivity to other important localities of Bangalore city. Electronic City, which was once considered a suburban area, is now considered as part of the city due to the development and connectivity.

=== Road ===
BMTC bus services are the most popular mode of transport. There are many BMTC buses starting from Electronic City Bustand (near Hosur Road), Wipro Gate and Infosys Gate ply to all important parts of the city. There are buses from E-City up to KIA. There are frequent BMTC services to Bannerghatta Road, Silk Board, Brigade Road, Attibele, Kengeri, K R Market, KBS etc. Most auto-rickshaws in Electronic City do not charge by the meter and hence an avoidable mode of transport.

==== Hosur Road ====
Electronic City is on Hosur Road which is a major arterial highway of Bangalore city. Many BMTC buses and interstate buses use this route.

==== Elevated Expressway ====
The four-lane mixed corridor elevated highway from Silk Board junction to Electronic City was opened on 22 January 2010. The 9.985 km long expressway is one of the longest elevated national highways in the country. This elevated stretch helps a commuter reach Electronic City from Silk Board is 30 minutes. The toll price is revised periodically. The expressway has been prone to fatal crashes in its narrow lanes resulting in vehicles falling down from a height, posing high risk to the traffic on the highway below. BTP speed checks are common on this route.

==== NICE Road ====
The NICE road connects Electronic City to other key areas in the west of Bengaluru city like Bannerghatta Road, Mysore Road, Kanakapura Road and Tumkur Road. This is a 63 km 4-lane access controlled tollway. It is also a major route while travelling from E-city to districts like mangaluru or chikkamangaluru.

==== Metro rail ====
Electronic City is connected to central Bengaluru by the Yellow Line (R V Road - Bommasandra line) of Namma Metro, which was inaugurated on 10 August 2025 by Prime Minister Narendra Modi and opened for public service the following day. The 19.15 km fully elevated line runs from R.V. Road to Bommasandra and includes 16 stations. Electronic City is directly served by Electronic City metro station (the line's 13th stop) and Konappana Agrahara metro station, the latter built with funding support from the Infosys Foundation.

==== Suburban rail ====
The Heelalige railway station, about 4 km from Electronic City Phase 2, is part of the Bengaluru Suburban Railway system. The South Western Railways has introduced a fleet of diesel multiple units (DMUs) on this route. The nearest railway stations are Heelalige, which is 6 km from Electronic City, or Karmelaram railway station which is 14 km away.

=== Air ===
==== Bengaluru Airport ====
KIA (IATA: BLR, ICAO: VOBL) is located 56 km away from Electronic City. Travelling time from Electronic City to KIA is 2 hours by road in normal traffic, about 1.5 hours during late nights 12 am to 6 am, and about 3 hours during peak traffic.

==== Hosur Airport ====
The proposed Hosur Airport in Belagondapalli on Thally Road, an UDAN project, is expected to be nearer to Electronic City. Travelling time: 30 minutes by road. It is 28 km from Electronics City.

==== Heli taxis ====
Helicopter taxi service to Kempegowda International Airport was launched in March 2018 but stopped during COVID-19 due to operational issues.. The high fare and limited access to helipads make heli-taxis affordable only for industrialists and business travellers.

== Emergency services ==
- E-City Police Station
- BTP - Bangalore City Traffic Police
- CISF - Central Industrial Security Force Electronic City
- Electronic City Fire Station
- Electronic City Post Office

== Schools ==
National Public School, Hosur Road Treamis, Electronic City EISB St.Francis De Sales Public School, Hosur Road.
