= Old Airport Road, Bengaluru =

Road in Bangalore, India

Coordinates: 12.96°N 77.646°E

Old Airport Road is a major road in Bangalore, India. It was renamed from Airport Road after the new Kempegowda International Airport was opened at Devanahalli. Madivala Machideva Road is a 17 km stretch road which begins from the junction of Trinity Church Road and Victoria Road and goes to HAL Airport, Marathahalli, Varthur. Beyond that, the road officially becomes Varthur Road, but since the real estate boom started around 2003, builders have started calling the stretch between the Airport and the Marathahalli Outer Ring Road as Old Airport Road. Even so, due to the high significance of this road it has achieved due to its high accessibility for reaching Whitefield.

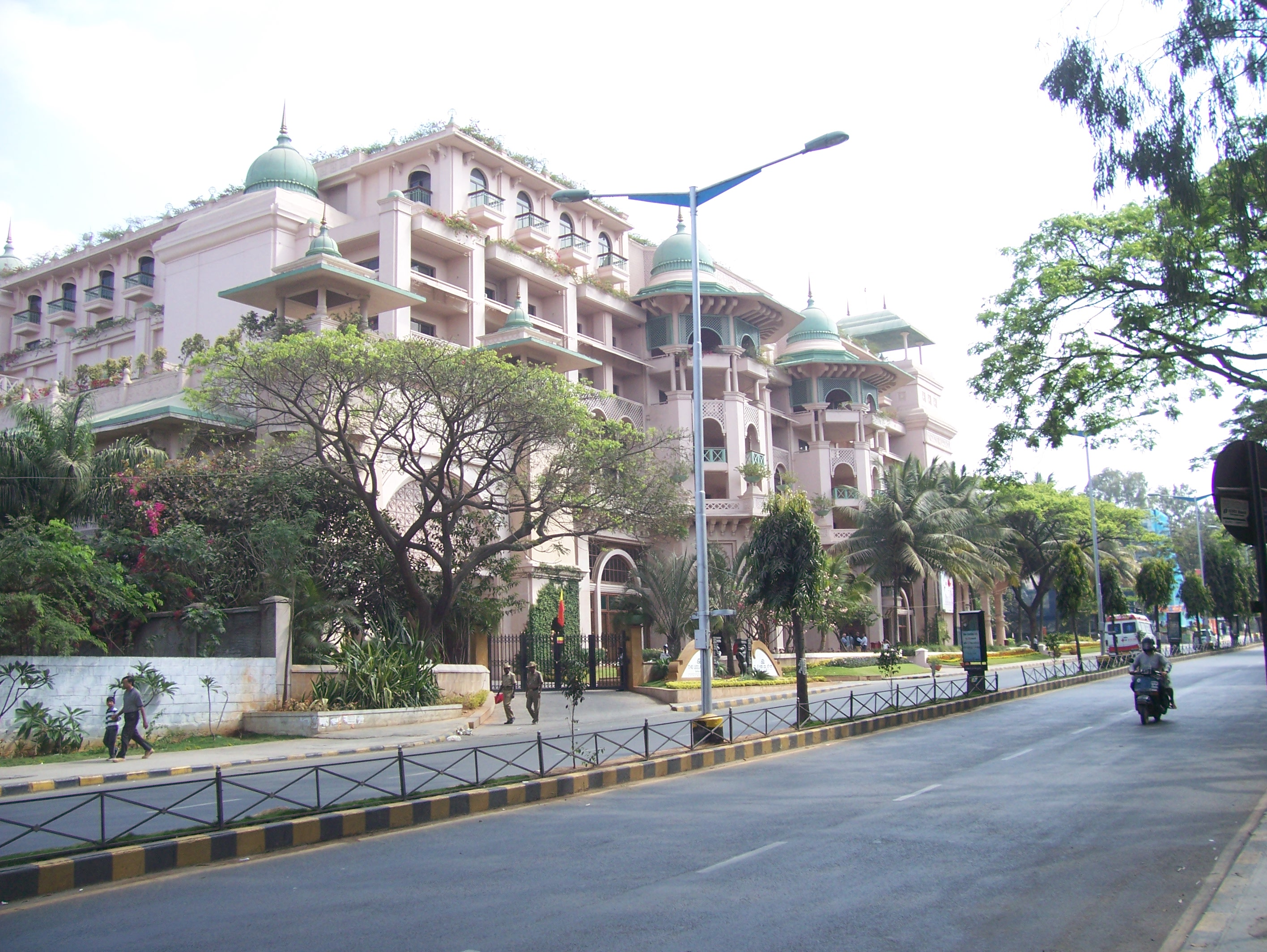
Old Airport Road in Bangalore with Hotel Leela Palace

Old Airport Road is considered one of the 10 "Black Spots" in Bangalore for its traffic problem.

== Landmarks ==
Some prominent landmarks on Airport Road are Command Hospital Air Force, the five star hotel Hotel Leela Palace, Diamond District Apartments, Builders Apartment, ISRO satellite centre campus, the four star hotel Sterlings MAC Hotel, Nilgiris supermarket, Manipal Hospital, and GlobalLogic India Pvt Ltd.'s Bangalore office (located in Anjaneya Techno Park). It also has Total Mall, which houses a temple with a huge statue of the Hindu god Shiva, complete with a cave-like "yatra" at the rear which was built in 1995.

== Other roads and localities ==
Some of the major roads that branch out of the road are the Indiranagar 100 Feet Road, Inner Ring Road, HAL Wind Tunnel Road and Suranjandas Road. The areas that it runs through are Domlur, Kodihalli, Murugeshpalya, Konena Agrahara, and Vimanapura.

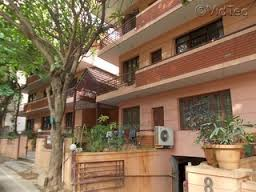
Washleigh Manor Apartments Rustam Bagh

Old Airport Road

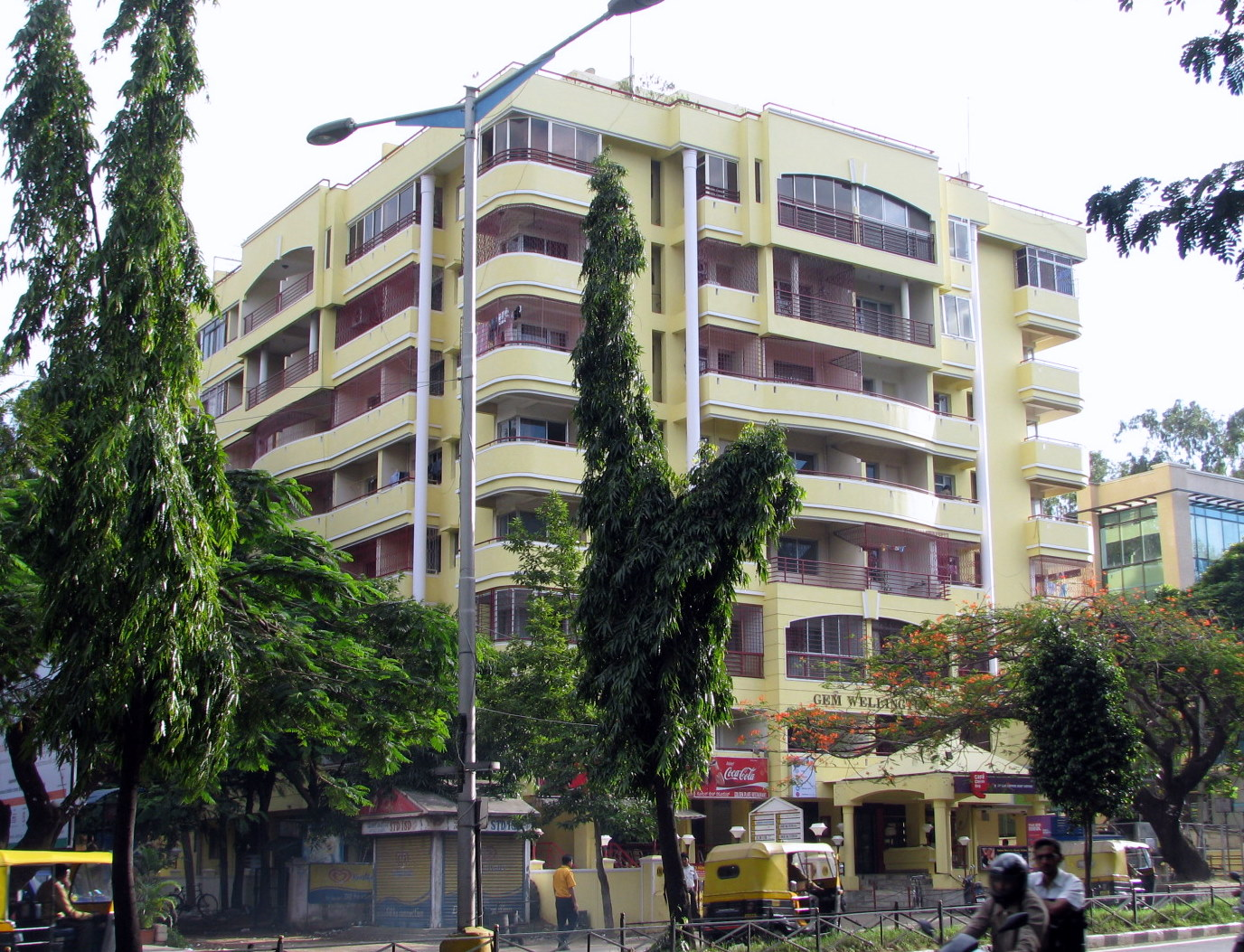
Gem Wellington Apartment

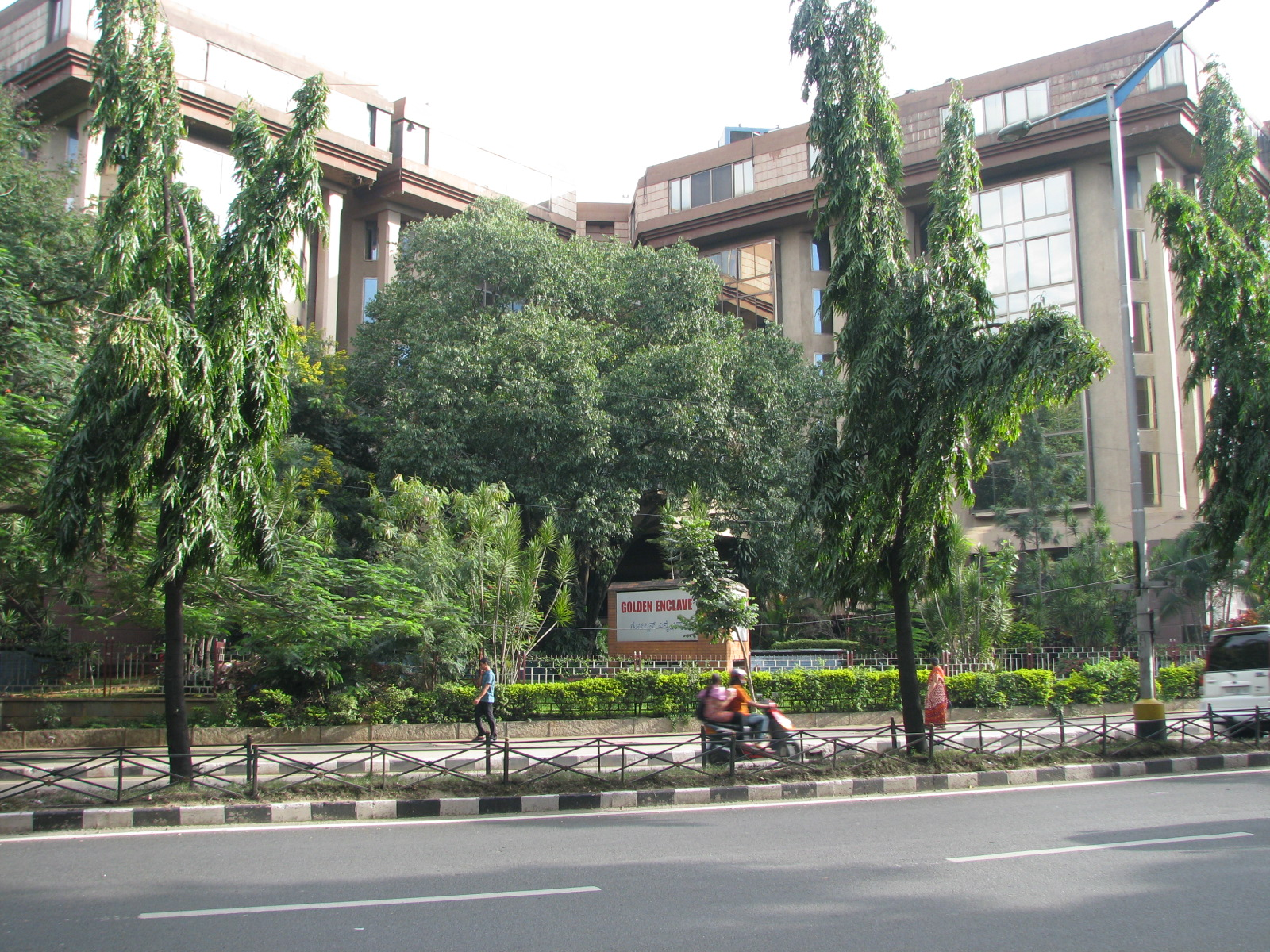
Golden Enclave

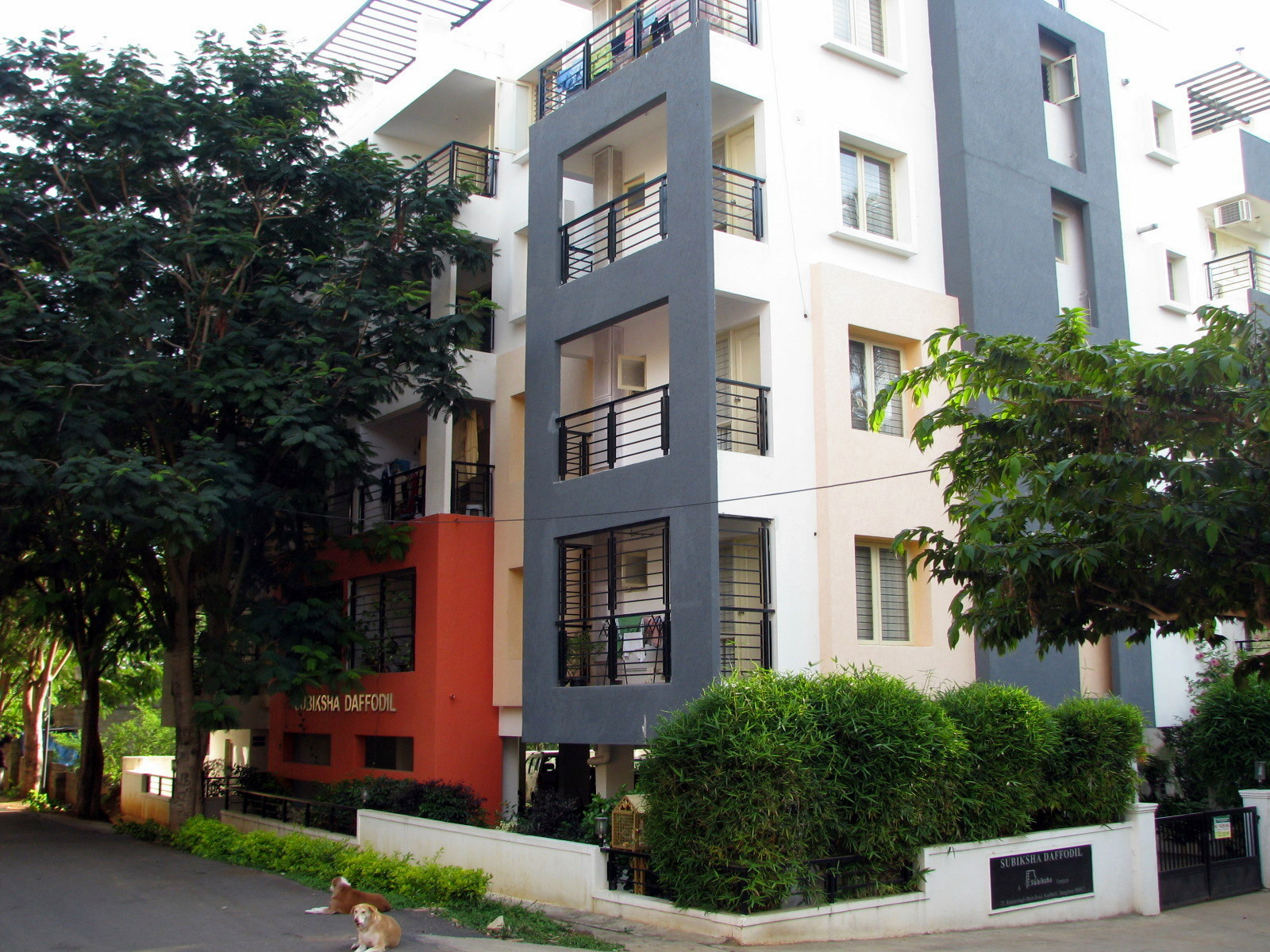
Subiksha Daffodil At Rustam Bagh

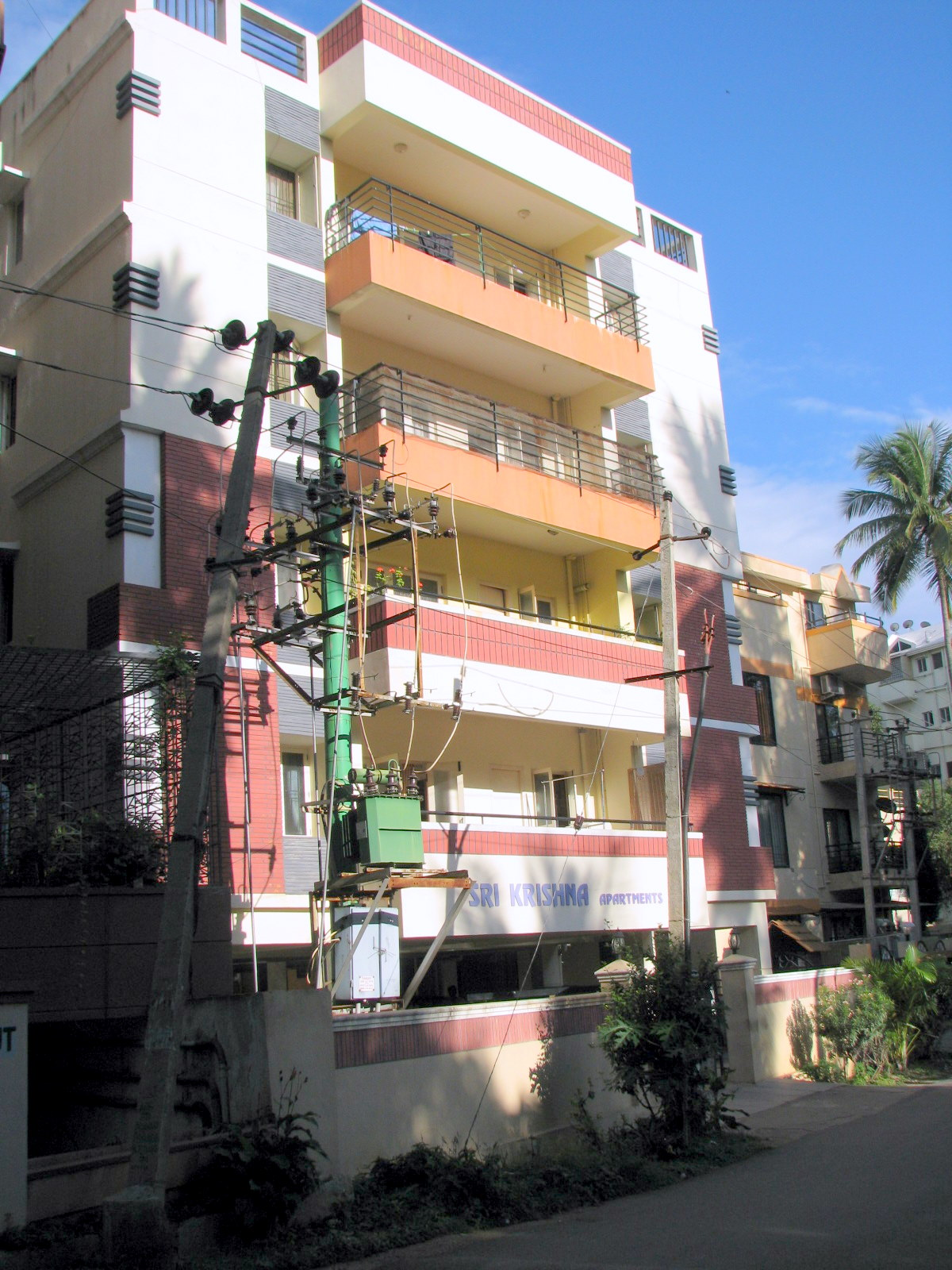
Sri Krishna Apartments inside Rustam Bagh

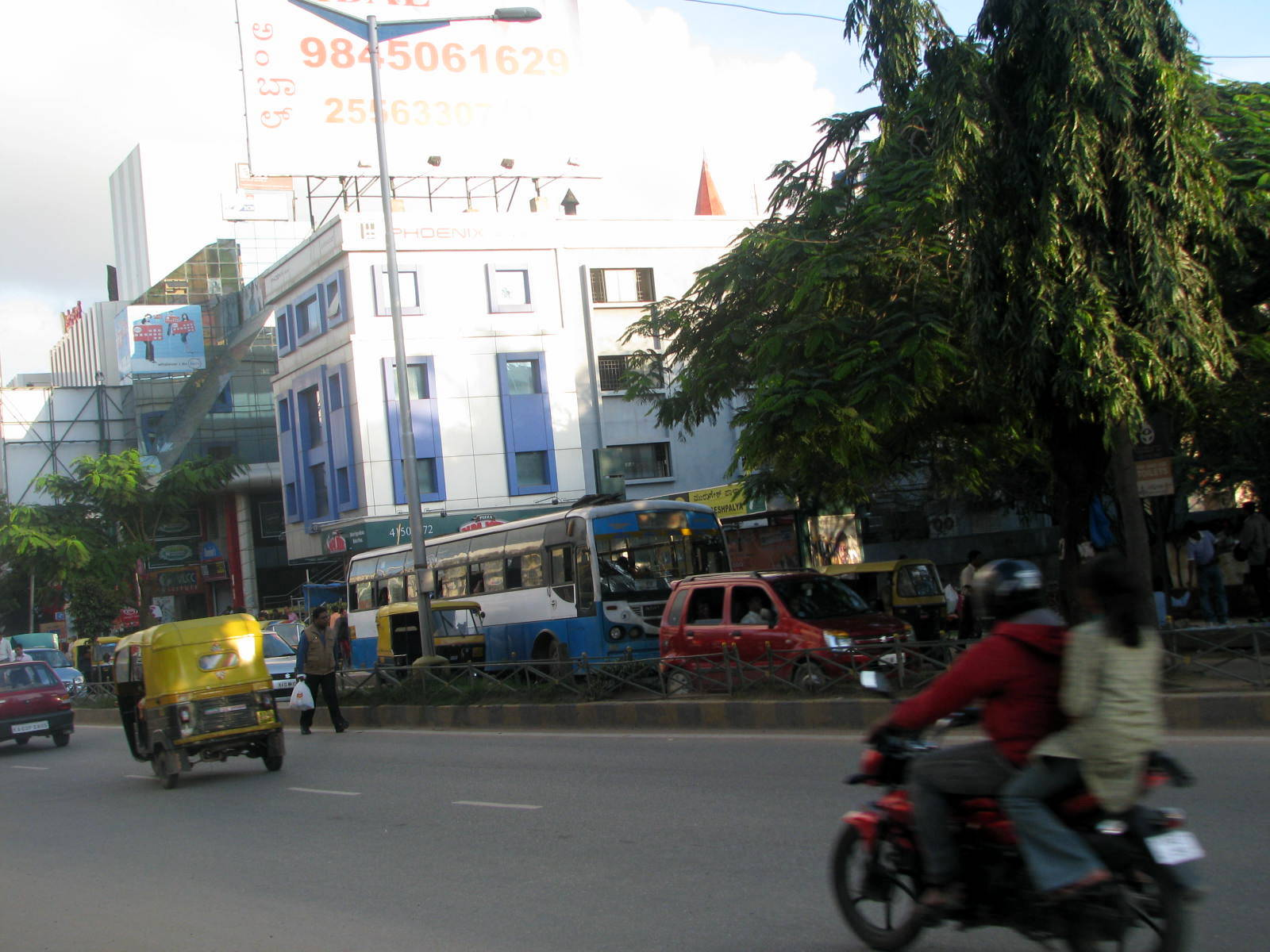
Old Airport Road, Bangalore

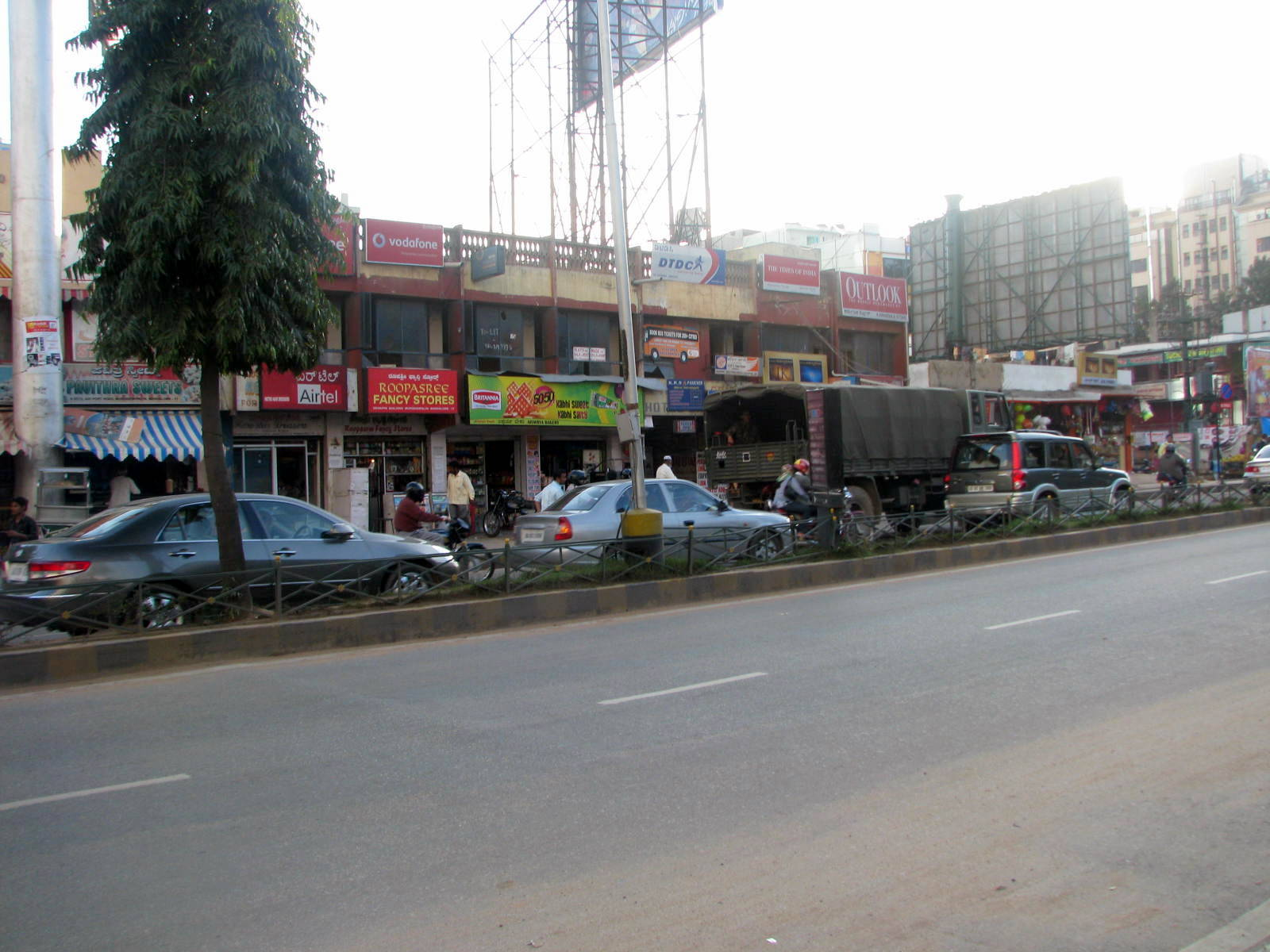
Old Airport Road

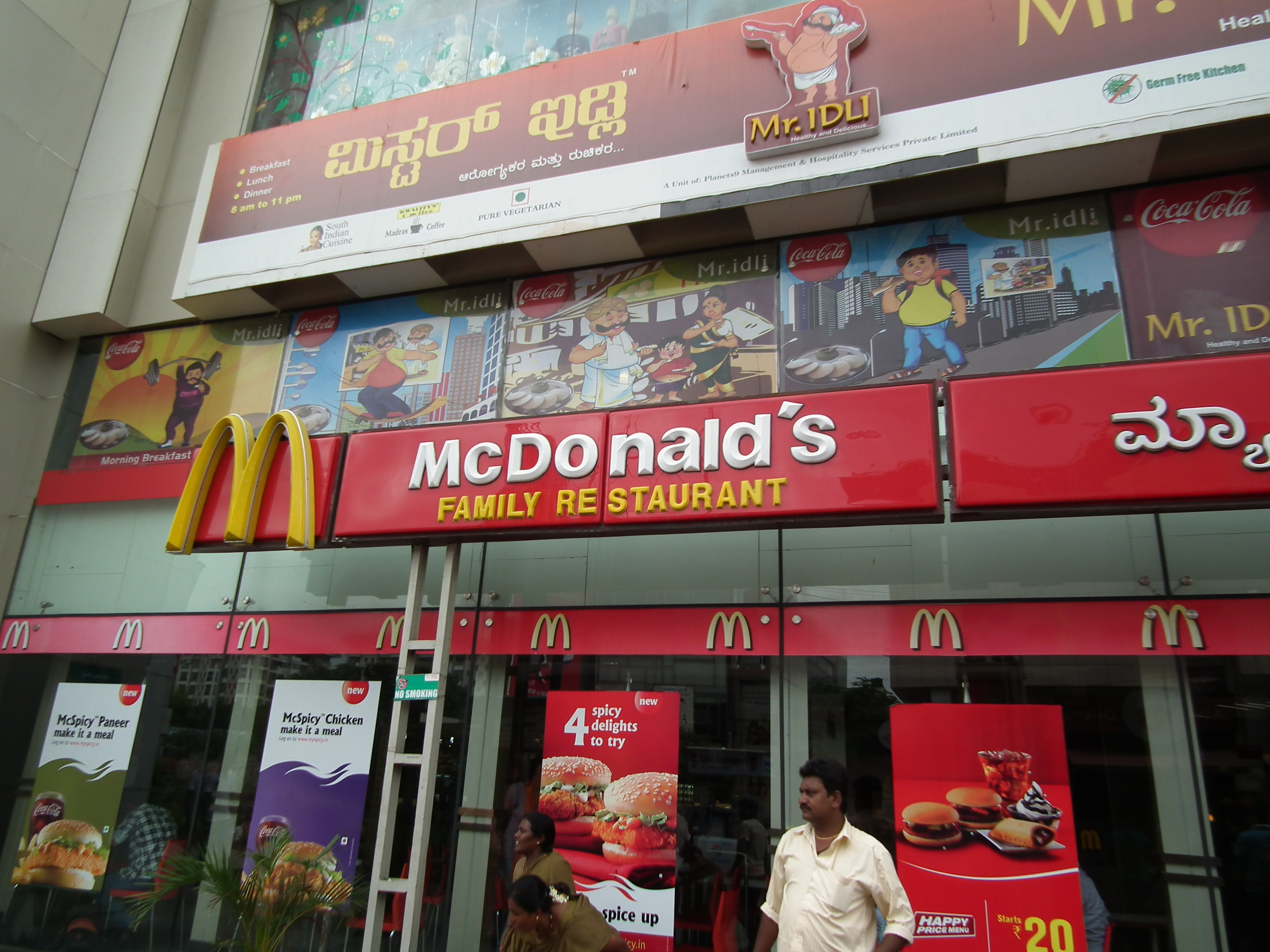
McDonald's at Total Mall, Old Airport Road, Bangalore

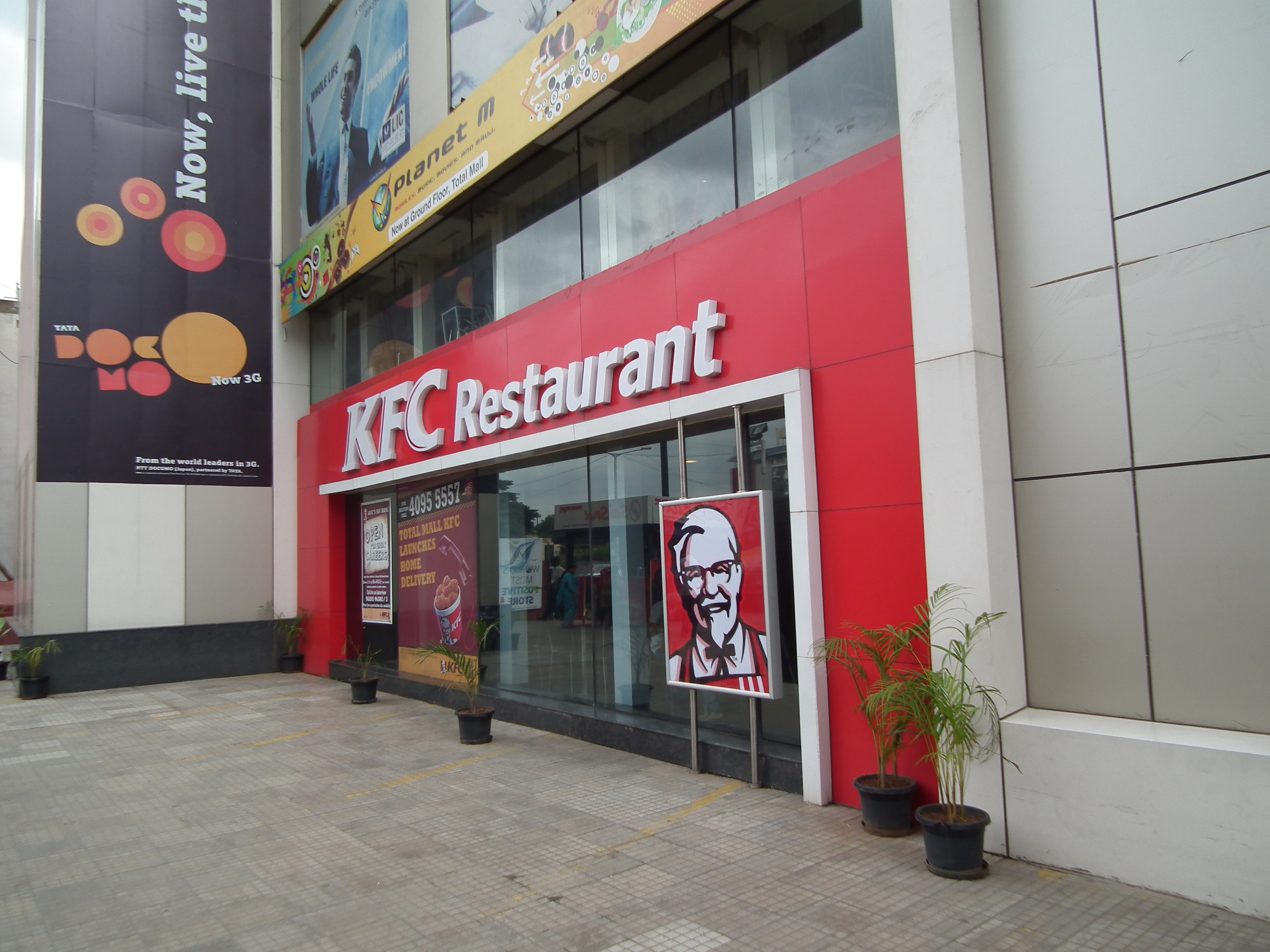
KFC restaurant at Total Mall, Old Airport Road, Bangalore

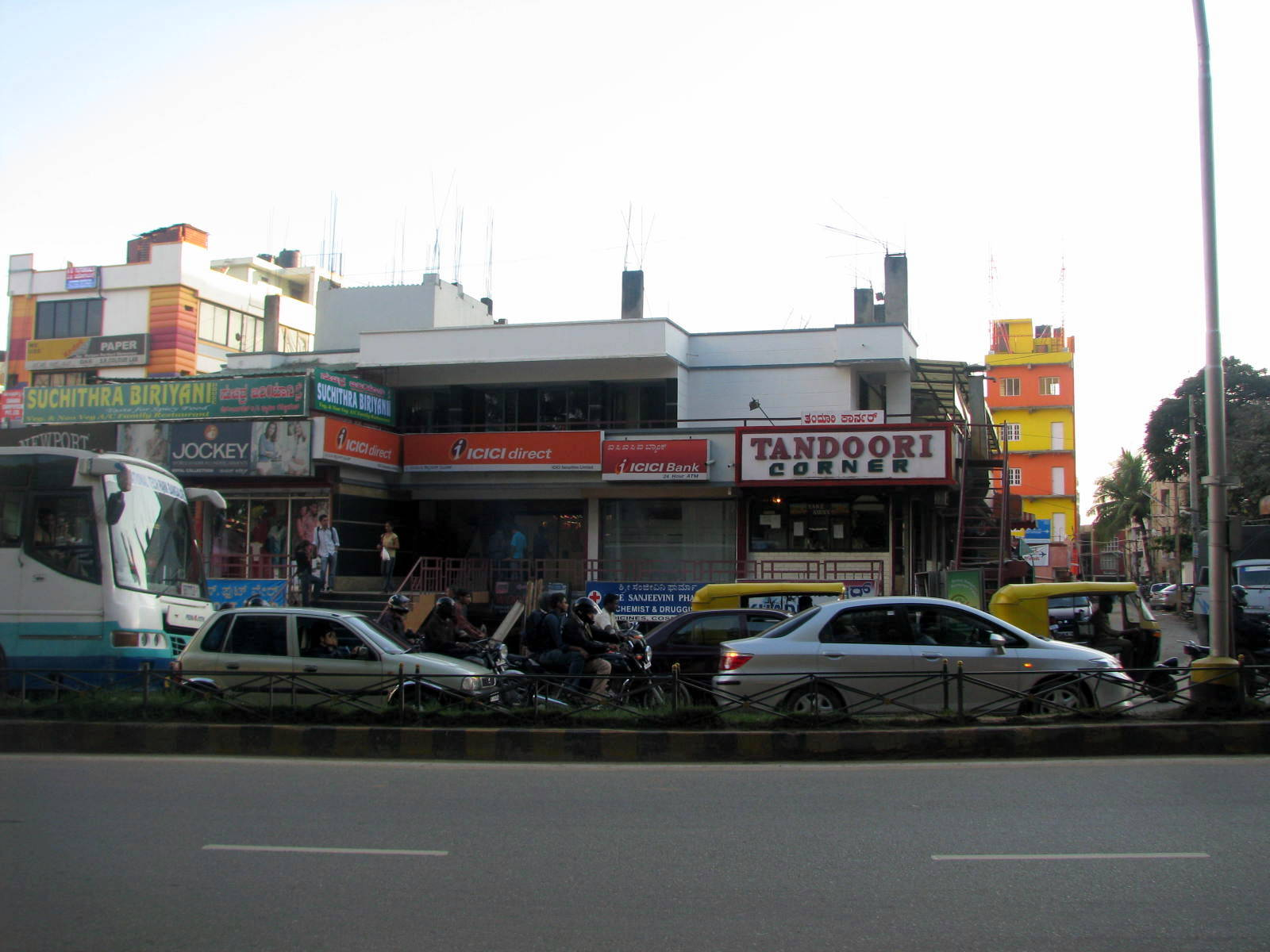
Old Airport Road, Tandoori corner

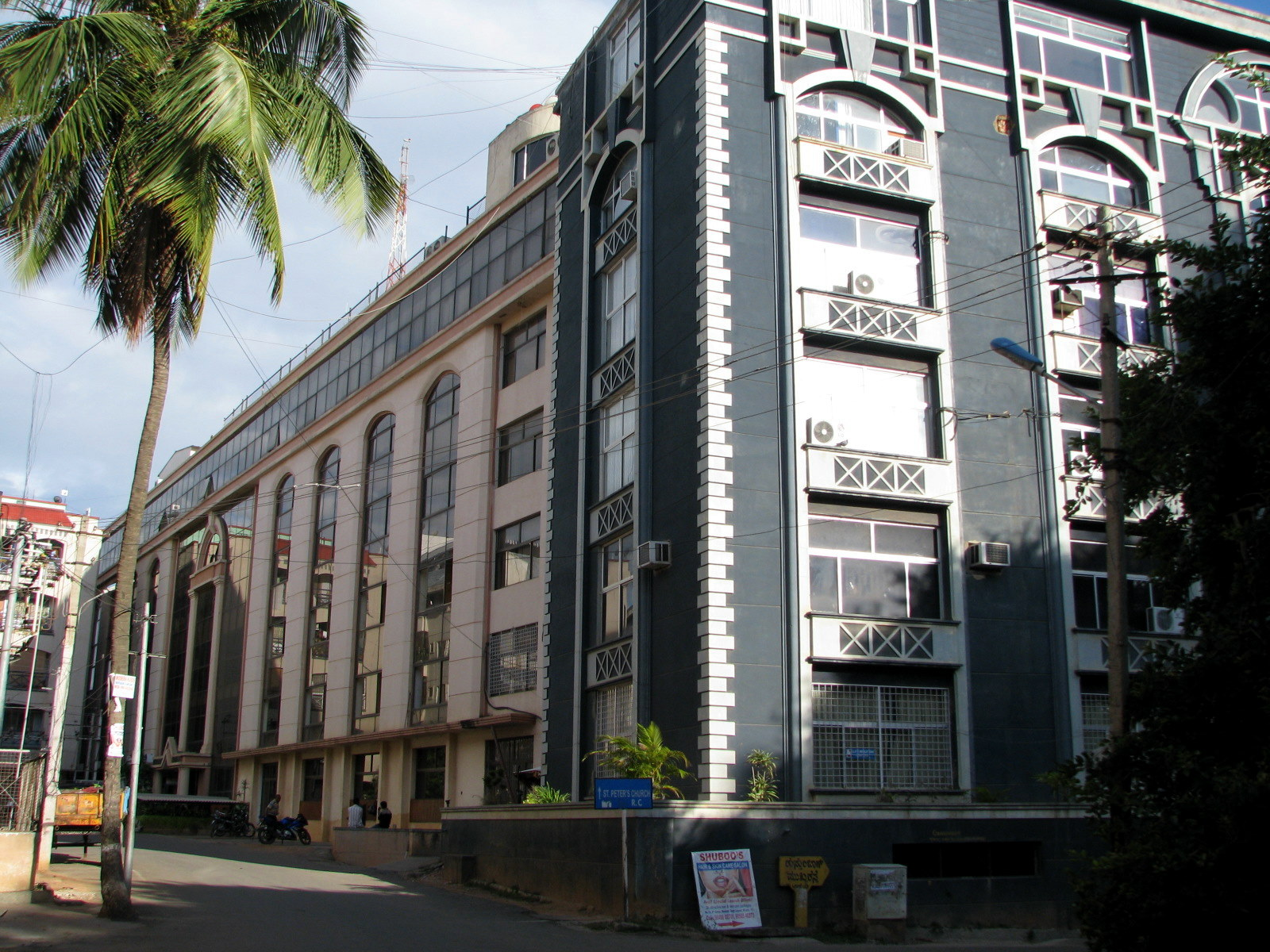
Oxford House inside Rustam Bagh

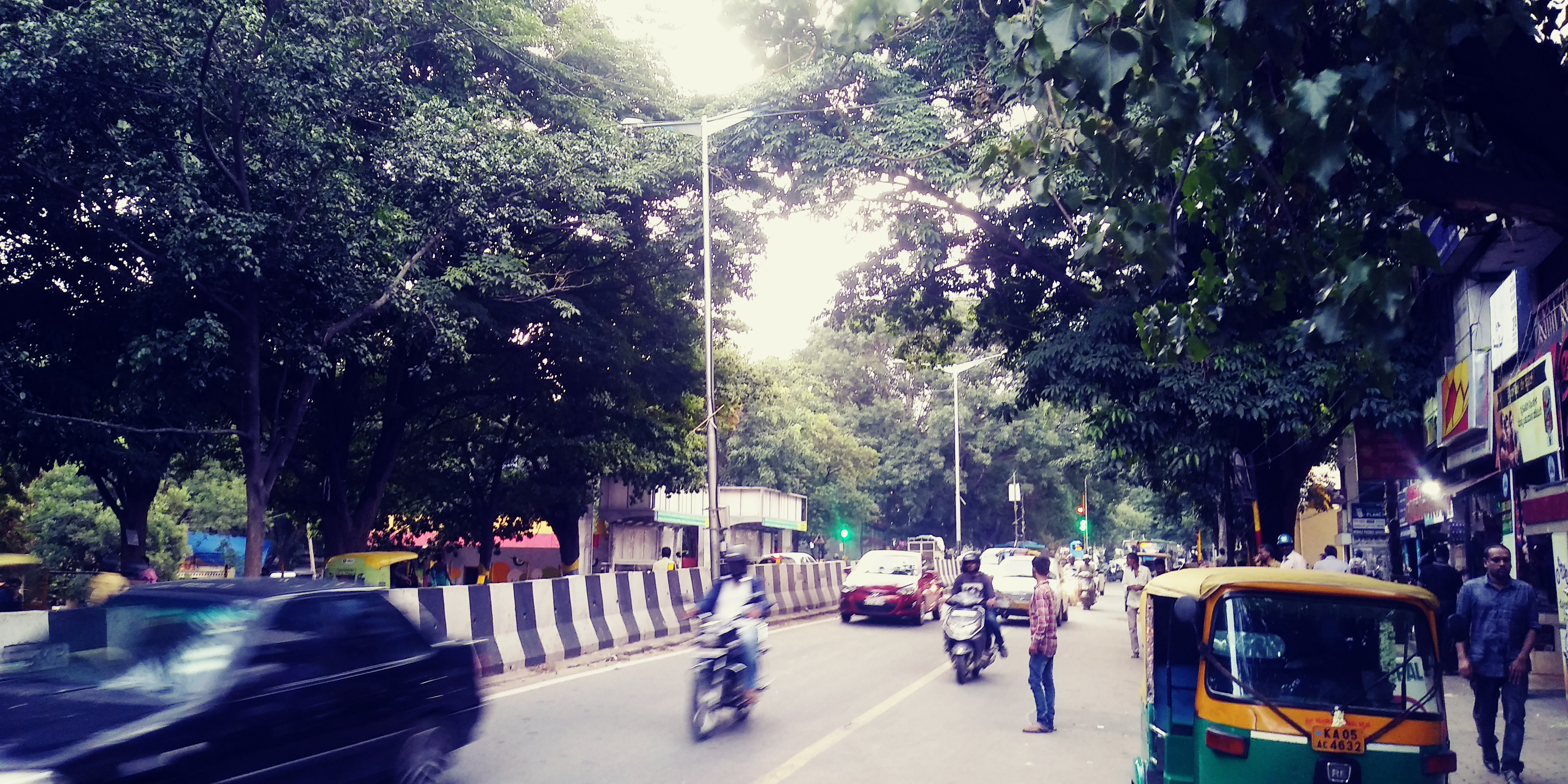
Old Airport Road at Domlur

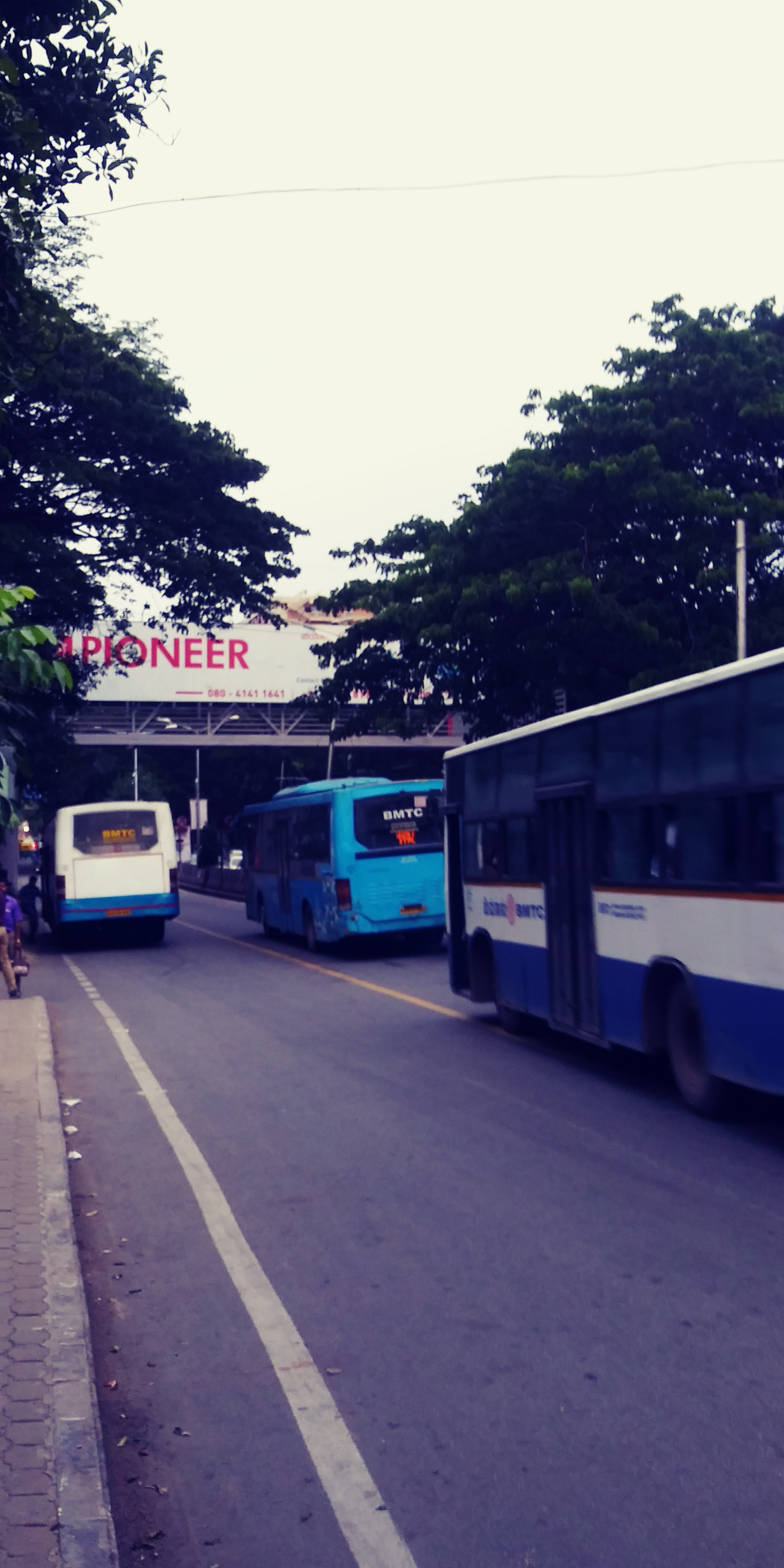
Pedestrian foot-bridge at Domlur Bus Stand Signal
