= The Leela Palace Bengaluru =

Hotel in Bengaluru, India

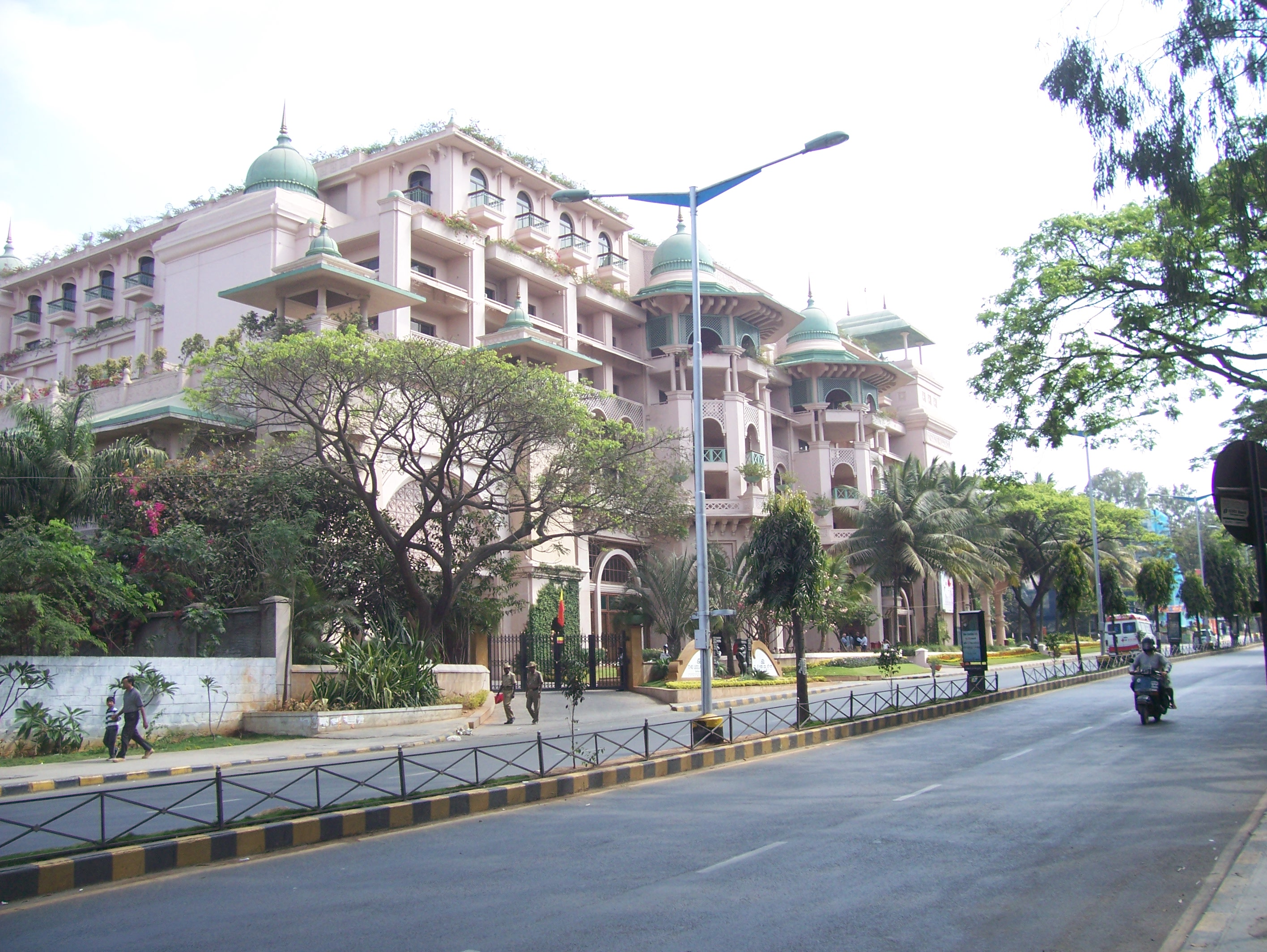
- The Leela Palace Bengaluru
- Interactive map of the The Leela Palace Bengaluru area
- Hotel chain: The Leela Palaces, Hotels and Resorts

General information
- Location: Bengaluru, Karnataka, India, 23, HAL Old Airport Road, Bengaluru
- Coordinates: 12°57′38″N 77°38′55″E
- Opening: August 16, 2001
- Owner: Schloss Bangalore Limited
- Operator: The Leela Palaces, Hotels and Resorts

Technical details
- Floor count: 6

Design and construction
- Developer: Hotel Leelaventure Limited

Other information
- Number of rooms: 357
- Number of suites: 29
- Number of restaurants: 7
- Parking: Valet and self-parking

Website
- Official website

The Leela Palace Bengaluru is a 357-room luxury hotel in Bengaluru, Karnataka, India. It is located on HAL Old Airport Road in the Kodihalli area of the city and forms part of The Leela Palaces, Hotels and Resorts chain. The hotel was developed by Hotel Leelaventure Limited and opened in 2001. It was acquired by Brookfield Asset Management in 2019.

== History ==
The Leela Palace Bengaluru was developed by Hotel Leelaventure Limited and opened on Old Airport Road in Bengaluru in 2001. The property was the group's third hotel after The Leela Mumbai and The Leela Goa.

The hotel commenced operations with a soft launch on 16 August 2001 with 71 rooms before being opened in phases to its full capacity.

In 2019, The Leela Palace Bengaluru became part of the portfolio of hotels acquired by Brookfield Asset Management from Hotel Leelaventure Limited. After the Brookfield acquisition, ownership of the hotel was consolidated under Schloss Bangalore Limited. It is a member of the Global Hotel Alliance and Preferred Hotels & Resorts.

== Architecture ==
The hotel incorporates elements of Indo-Saracenic architecture inspired by the Mysore Palace. It is constructed in pink sandstone and features copper domes, marble columns and large windows. The hotel is situated within approximately nine acres of landscaped gardens.

The grounds are decorated with sculptures of Yali, a mythical creature commonly depicted in South Indian temple architecture.

== Notable guests ==
Prime Minister Narendra Modi and German Chancellor Angela Merkel at The Leela Palace Bengaluru during a business forum organized by NASSCOM and the Fraunhofer Institute in 2015

Notable guests and visitors to the hotel have included former British prime minister David Cameron,, Bill Gates, 14th Dalai Lama, Tenzin Gyatso, music composer Ricky Kej, and chef Massimo Bottura.

The hotel was the venue for the wedding reception of Rishi Sunak and Akshata Murty in 2009, and the reception for actors Deepika Padukone and Ranveer Singh in 2018.

== Awards and recognition ==
The hotel was ranked first in India and fourth among city hotels in Asia in the 2024 Travel + Leisure World's Best Awards. It has received EDGE Advanced certification for sustainable building practices. It is listed as a Michelin Guide Selected Hotel.

In 2023, the hotel was ranked 10th among Indian hotels in La Liste's 2023 World's Best Hotels rankings. In La Liste's 2024 Top 1000 Restaurants in the World, Jamavar and Le Cirque Signature, restaurants at the hotel, received scores of 83 and 82.5, respectively. ZLB23, a bar at the hotel, was ranked 31st in Asia's 50 Best Bars in 2025 and was named the Favourite Bar in an Indian Hotel at the 2025 Condé Nast Traveller Readers' Travel Awards.

The hotel was included in the Condé Nast Traveler Gold List in 2023, and was ranked 15th among the Top 20 Hotels in India in the 2023 Readers' Choice Awards, the UK edition also ranked it 15th among the Best Hotels in India.

In a review published in 2016, travel writer Olivia Greenway of the British newspaper The Daily Telegraph awarded the hotel a rating of 9 out of 10, praised its architecture and service, and featured it in the newspaper's list of the best hotels in Bengaluru.

== Sustainability ==
In October 2023, the hotel joined Beyond Green, a sustainable hotel portfolio of Preferred Hotels & Resorts. As a member, the hotel adhered to more than 50 sustainability indicators aligned with the United Nations Sustainable Development Goals. The hotel sources approximately 90% of its energy from wind power and uses in-house water bottling and biodegradable bathroom amenities to reduce single-use plastics.
