= Wimberly Allison Tong & Goo =

American architectural firm

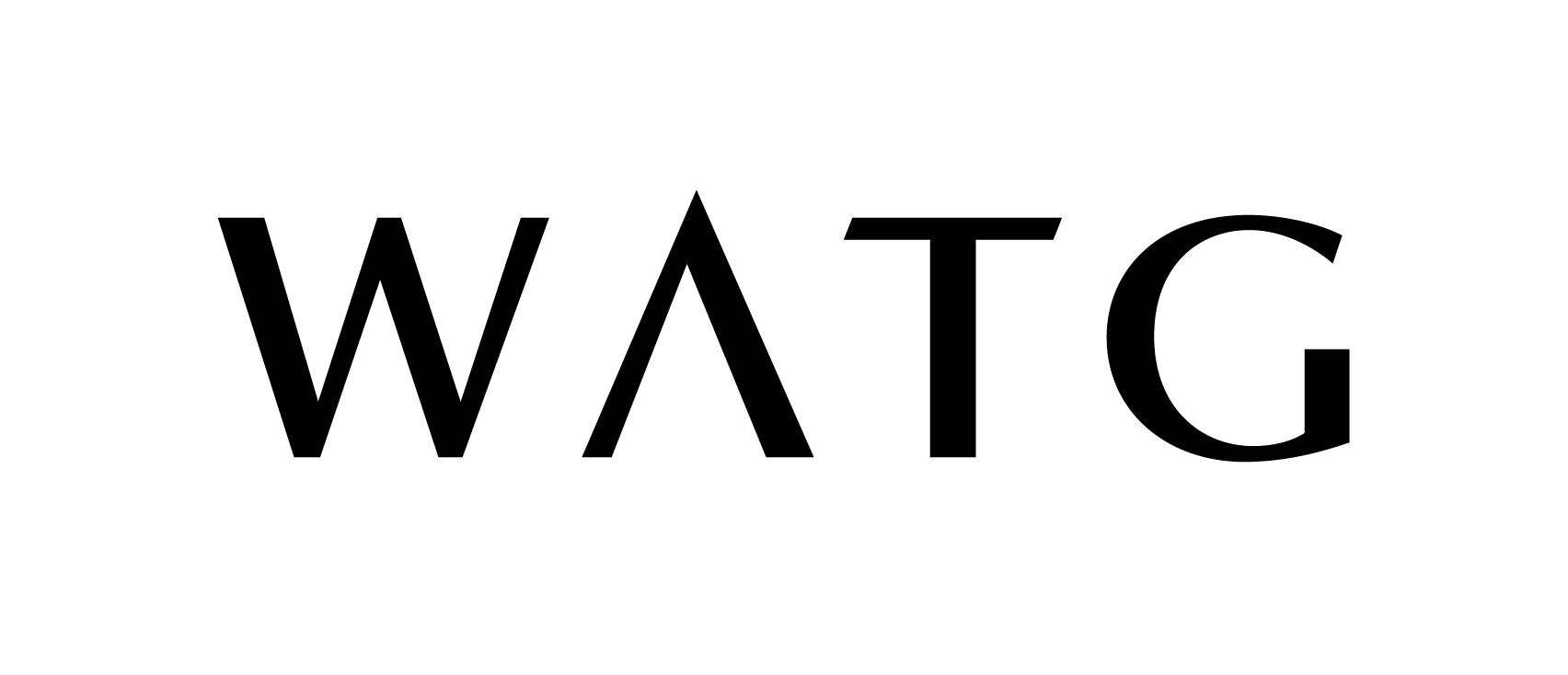
- Type: Privately owned
- Industry: Architecture
- Founded: 1945
- Headquarters: Irvine
- Website: www.watg.com

Wimberly, Allison, Tong & Goo, also known as WATG, is an architectural firm with offices in London, Singapore, Shanghai, Honolulu, Tustin, Los Angeles, New York, Dallas and Atlantic City. They have designed projects in 170 countries across six continents.

== History ==
George ‘Pete’ Wimberly and Howard L. Cook started renovations on the Royal Hawaiian Hotel in 1945, and formed Wimberly and Cook in Honolulu, Hawaii. In 1971, George Whisenand, Jerry Allison, Greg Tong and Don Goo joined Pete Wimberly; in 1988 the firm became Wimberly Allison Tong and Goo, also known as WATG.

As of 2014, WATG is owned by an Employee Benefit Trust.

== Recognition ==
WATG was awarded the Aga Khan Award for Architecture for its Tanjong Jara Beach Hotel and Rantau Abang Visitor Center in Terengganu, Malaysia.

== Notable projects ==
- Atlantis Paradise Island, Paradise Island, the Bahamas
- Disneyland Hotel, Paris, France
- Encore Las Vegas, Las Vegas Strip in Paradise, Nevada
- Emirates Palace, Abu Dhabi, United Arab Emirates
- ITC Royal Bengal Kolkata, West Bengal, India
- LEED Platinum Bardessono Hotel, Yountville, California
- Royal Opera House Muscat (ROHM), Muscat, Oman
- Lisboa Palace, Cotai in Macau
- The Leela Palace Bengaluru, Karnataka, India
