= Doug (disambiguation) =

Doug is a masculine given name.

Doug may also refer to:

- Doug (TV series), an American animated sitcom aired from 1991 to 1999
- Doug (album), a 1988 album by the Coolies
- Doug E. Doug, Caribbean-American actor, born Douglas Bourne (born 1970)
- Doug (tuber)
- Doug flag, also called "the Doug", an unofficial flag of the Cascadia bioregion of western North America
- Dig Dug, the eponymous protagonist of the Dig Dug series of video games
- 93.1 Doug FM, a former brand of WUFL (FM), a radio station licensed to Detroit, Michigan
- The reptile monster from the Monsterverse that appear in Godzilla vs. Kong and Godzilla x Kong: The New Empire that appear in the Hollow Earth.
