= The Coolies =

US musical group

- Genres: Alternative rock, post-punk, laffabilly
- Years active: 1986–1989
- Labels: DB, Casino
- Past members: Jeb Baldwin; Billy Burton; Rob Gal; Clay Harper; Frogg Jaguar Mellonball; Teddy Murray

The Coolies were an American alternative rock band from Atlanta, Georgia, active from 1986 to 1989. They derived their name from a dictionary definition of coolie, which defines the word as a derogatory term for "one who does heavy work for little pay".

== dig..? ==
The Coolies' first album, dig..? was released in 1986 by DB Records, and consisted of nine tongue-in-cheek covers of Simon & Garfunkel classics plus a version of Paul Anka's 1974 No. 1 hit "(You're) Having My Baby". While Anka's version received criticism for perceived sexist undertones, Coolies lead singer Clay Harper takes it to a whole new level with a brief spoken interlude at the end of the song in which he reveals that she is not the only woman in town having his baby. Thus, he must leave town. "Scarborough Fair" was released as a 7″ single.

== Doug ==
dig..? was followed up in 1988 by the rock opera Doug. Doug contains 13 original tracks, mostly written by guitarist Rob Gal, in the style of various previously existing bands. For example, "Cook Book" is reminiscent of the Who's Tommy, and "Pussy Cook" is more-or-less a reworking of the Beastie Boys' "Cooky Puss". Other bands paid homage to or spoofed include Led Zeppelin, John Lennon and The Replacements.

Doug is the story of a skinhead, named Doug, who kills a drag queen short-order cook, steals his recipe book and becomes a "culinary giant" when the cookbook becomes a nationwide bestseller. Doug embraces the celebrity lifestyle of stretch limousines and partying. Soon, his guilt drives him to become paranoid, and he's certain that the entire food service industry knows of his crime and is out for revenge—so he decides he will stop eating, and subsist solely on crack cocaine and alcohol. Having squandered his fortune on luxuries and drugs, Doug ends up back on the streets in poverty. IGN rated Doug the thirteenth greatest rock opera of all time in 2006. A comic book version of this tale, drawn by singer/songwriter Jack Logan was included with the LP record and could be acquired by sending a dollar to DB Recs.

Original drummer Billy Burton, who essentially was moon-lighting from his full-time gig with The Swimming Pool Q's when dig..? was recorded, is replaced by Frogg Jaguar Mellonball on Doug. The album also features John Cerreta on keyboards, but he is not credited with being a member of the band. Cerreta also played keyboards for "I Am a Rock" on dig..?

== Take That You Bastards! ==
The Coolies disbanded in 1989 while working on a third album. Three tracks recorded during sessions for this album were released in 1995 on Take That You Bastards! on Harper's Casino Records label. Take That You Bastards! is a two disc set containing both Coolies albums in their entirety (with the exception of "Mrs. Robinson" from dig..?), the three previously unreleased tracks and the Simon & Garfunkel cover of "The Sounds of Silence", which was the B-side of "Scarborough Fair".

== Other musical ventures ==
Following the break up of the Coolies, Gal and Harper formed the short lived bands Lester Square, and later Ottoman Empire. After two albums also released on DB Recs, Ottoman Empire also disbanded. Gal joined 6X, while Harper embarked on a solo career with the ten track East of Easter. After this, he recorded a children's record, Not Dogs...Too Simple (A Tale of Two Kitties) with his brother, Mark (who was also a member of Ottoman Empire) in 1998. The album featured guest appearances by Ian Dury (of "Hit Me With Your Rhythm Stick" fame), Drivin N Cryin's Kevn Kinney, former Georgia Satellites guitarist Rick Richards, former Velvet Underground drummer Maureen Tucker, Murray Attaway of Guadalcanal Diary, and the B-52's Cindy Wilson.

The Harper Brothers recorded The Slippery Ballerina, a second children's album, in 1999. A year later, Clay Harper wrote and produced the concept album Main Street: the Original Soundtrack to the Motion Picture (there is no such movie in spite of this name), but does not appear on it. In 2013, Harper released Old Airport Road, his second solo album,. He's also released several singles on Casino over the years.

Harper has gone on to become something of a culinary giant himself. He is the owner of the Fellini's Pizza chain and La Fonda Latina Restaurants in Georgia.

Gal has moved into audio engineering, with Sugarland's Gold and Green among his credits. Teddy Murray joined Donkey shortly after the Coolies broke up. The band released a live album called Slick Night Out in 1993 on Atlanta independent label Steam Records, followed by the studio album Ten Cent Freaks in 1994 on Amphion Records. Jeb Baldwin and Frogg Jaguar Mellonball went on to start The Mighty Fine Slabs as the house band at Fat Matt's Rib Shack from 1991 until 1999.

== Discography ==
- dig..? (1986), DB Records
- Doug (1988), DB Records
- Take That You Bastards! (1995), Casino Records – compilation album
