= The Leela Group =

Indian conglomerate

- Company type: Private
- Industry: Hospitality; Tourism; Fashion; Real estate
- Founded: 1981; 45 years ago
- Founder: C. P. Krishnan Nair
- Headquarters: India
- Key people: C. P. Krishnan Nair (Founder); Vivek Nair (Chairman); Dinesh Nair (Co-Chairman)
- Website: http://www.theleela.com/

The Leela Group is an Indian business conglomerate founded by Chittarath Poovakkatt Krishnan Nair in 1981, and named after his wife. The hotel division, The Leela Palaces, Hotels and Resorts, is its most well known. It describes itself as involved in: "hotel and resort properties; IT and business parks; as well as, real estate development". Its headquarters are in India.

The company consists (at least) of the following divisions:

1. Hotel Leelaventure Ltd. (BSE: 500193 NSE: HOTELEELA)
2. Leela Lace Holdings Pvt. Ltd.
3. Leela Lace Software Solutions Pvt. Ltd
4. Leela Fashions Pvt. Ltd.
5. Leela Innovation Centre Pvt. Ltd.
6. Leela Housing Pvt Ltd
7. Leela Soft Pvt. Ltd.
8. Leela Lace Estate Pvt. Ltd.
9. Leela Villas Pvt. Ltd.
10. Leela Lace Info Park Pvt. Ltd.
11. LeelaConstates Pvt. Ltd.
12. Leelarealcon Pvt. Ltd.
13. Leela IT Projects Pvt. Ltd.
14. Leela Lace Builders Pvt. Ltd.
15. Leela Techno Parks Pvt. Ltd
