= The Possibilities =

American rock band

- Origin: Athens, Georgia, United States
- Genres: Indie rock, alternative country
- Years active: 1991–2000s
- Labels: Backburner; Parasol
- Members: Kevin Lane; Bob Spires; Matt Lane; Chris Grehan; Jason Gonzalez

The Possibilities were a rock band from Athens, Georgia formed in 1991. Their sound was described as "psychedelia-tinged alt country" and "country-skronk".

== History ==
Formed in 1991 by Kevin Lane (vocals, guitar), Bob Spires (bass guitar), and Matt Lane (drums, vocals), the band did not release anything other than a self-released cassette until their self-titled 1999 debut album, by which time the line-up had expanded to include Chris Grehan (guitar, vocals) and Jason Gonzalez (keyboards, vocals). The debut album was described by Allmusic as "country-skronk". Prior to this, the band had acted as backing for Jack Logan (playing on Buzz Me In and Monkey Paw) and Todd McBride (on Sketchy). The band's sound was described as "psychedelia-tinged alt country", drawing comparisons with Flaming Lips, Apples in Stereo, and Outrageous Cherry.

The indie 'Supergroup' Minus 5 covered a Possibilities song, "You Don't Mean It" on their Let the War Against Music Begin.

The band's second album, Way Out, described by Allmusic as "a pure psych-pop delight", was released in 2002 by Parasol Records, and was their last release.

== Discography ==
=== Albums ===
- Scattered, Smothered, Covered and Chunked (1995), self-released cassette
- The Possibilities (1999), Backburner
- Way Out (2002), Parasol

=== Singles ===
- "Invisible" (2001), Seed & Feed
