= Murugeshpalya =

- neighbourhood
- Location in Bengaluru, India
- Coordinates: 12.968344°N 77.65995°E
- Country: India
- State: Karnataka
- District: Bengaluru Urban
- Metro: Bengaluru

Languages
  - Official: Kannada
- Time zone: UTC+5:30 (IST)
- PIN: 560017

Murugeshpalya is a neighbourhood in Bengaluru, India.

== Location ==
It lies south of Old Airport Road, bounded by Vimanapura (including the Old Airport - Hindustan Aeronautics Limited Airport) - on the east and the Old Airport's runway on the south. National Aeronautics Laboratory Road or NAL Road is also called Wind Tunnel Road and cuts through Murugeshpalya on the western side. Extending west nearly 600 mts from the "mouth" of NAL road is the large "Murugeshpalya Domestic Camp". Further down the road, just before it reaches the runway of the HAL Airport, is one of Bangalore's oldest IT Parks: the "Golf View Campus".

Towards the Old HAL Airport lies the Kemp Fort Mall, and further down is the Visvesvaraya First Grade college. The key landmark in this area is the Shiva temple, within the Kemp Fort Mall complex.

== Economy ==
The Golf View Campus along the Wind Tunnel Road was once the home of IT firms such as Texas Instruments, Lucent Technologies and Hewlett-Packard. Most of these companies moved to bigger tech parks, leaving Cognizant as the remaining IT company here. The old buildings are now being re-purposed; the campus now hosts Ola Cabs. The Uber office, the call center for Omega Healthcare and Truhealing (Obstetrician & Gynaecologist) are also located on this road.

== Shiva temple ==
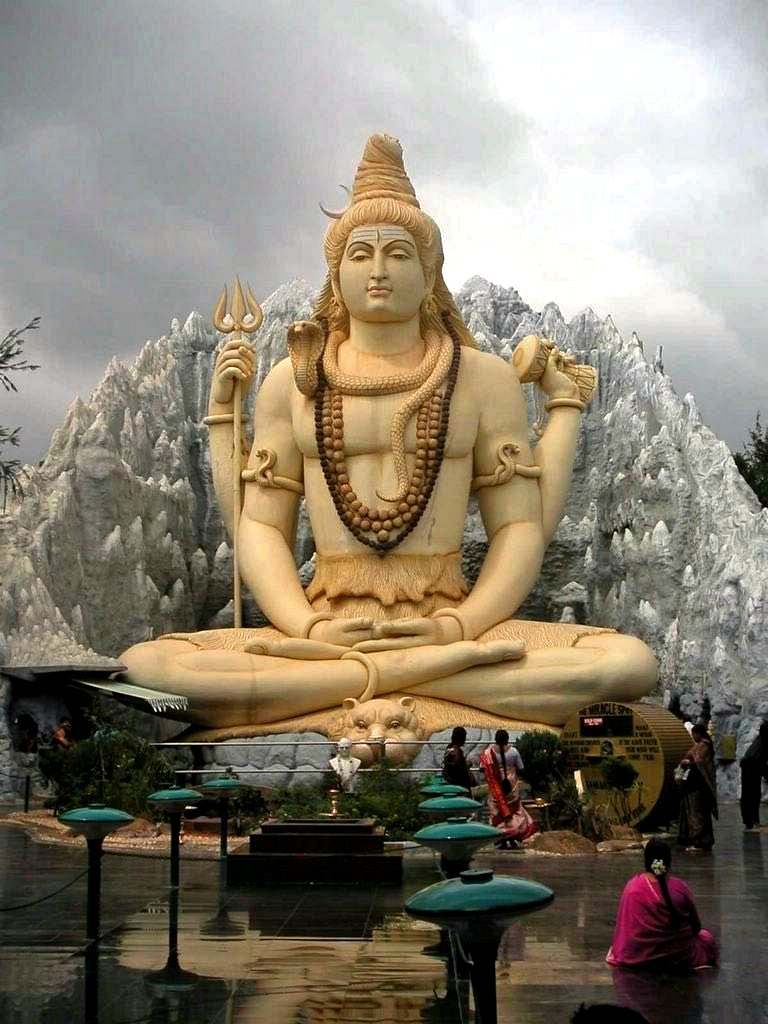
Shiva Statue which is 65 feet tall

The Shiva temple has a 65 foot tall Shiva cement statue in addition to a huge Lord Ganesha statue and a Navagraha temple inside. Beneath the statue is a pathway where models of Shiva exist in different forms. These are often replicas of the lingams found in other parts of the country. One of the famous lingams located here is made of ice and is said to be a replica of the one in Amarnath.

== Gallery ==
Murugeshpalya Gallery

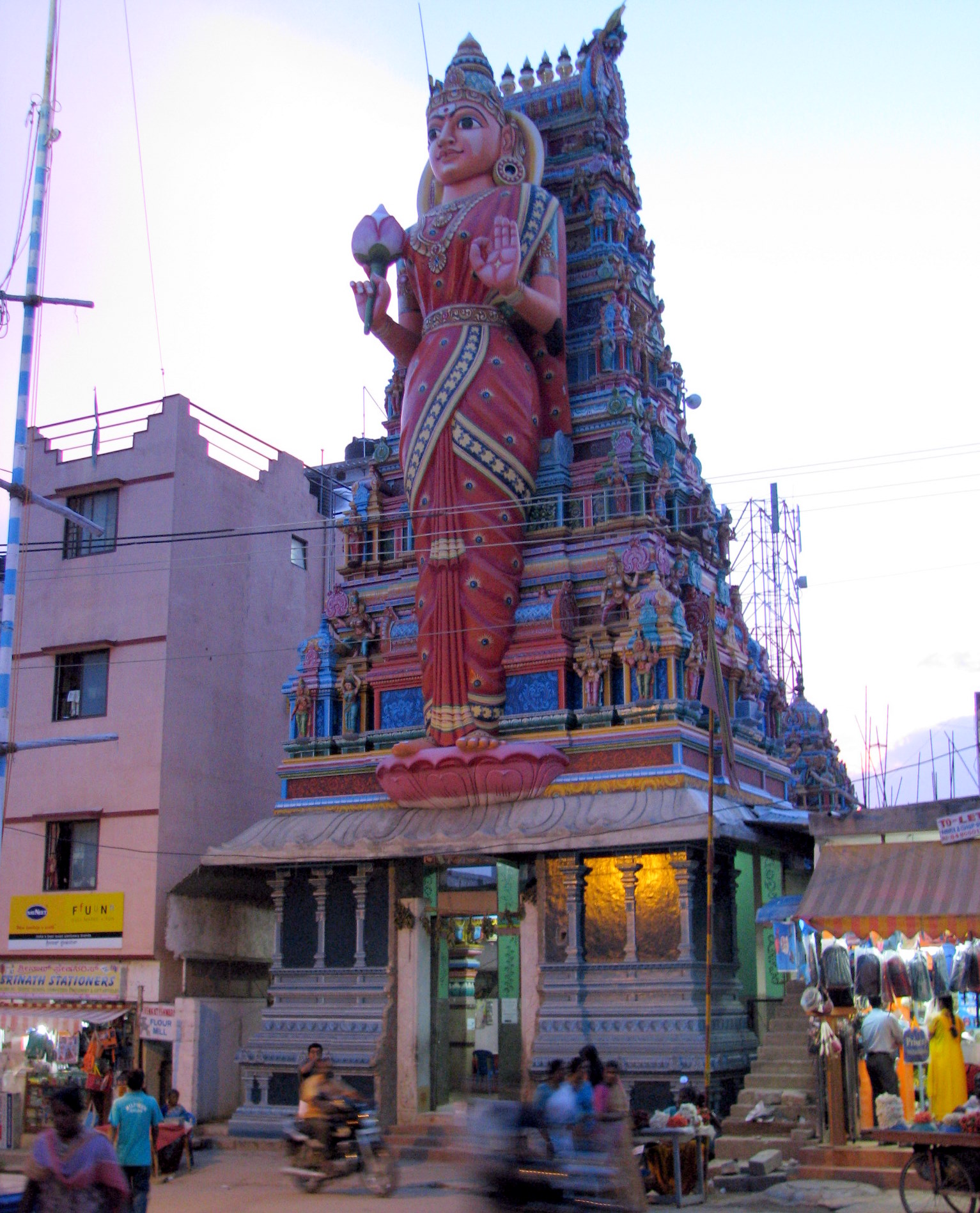
Ammavaru Temple
Murugeshpalya panoramic Gallery

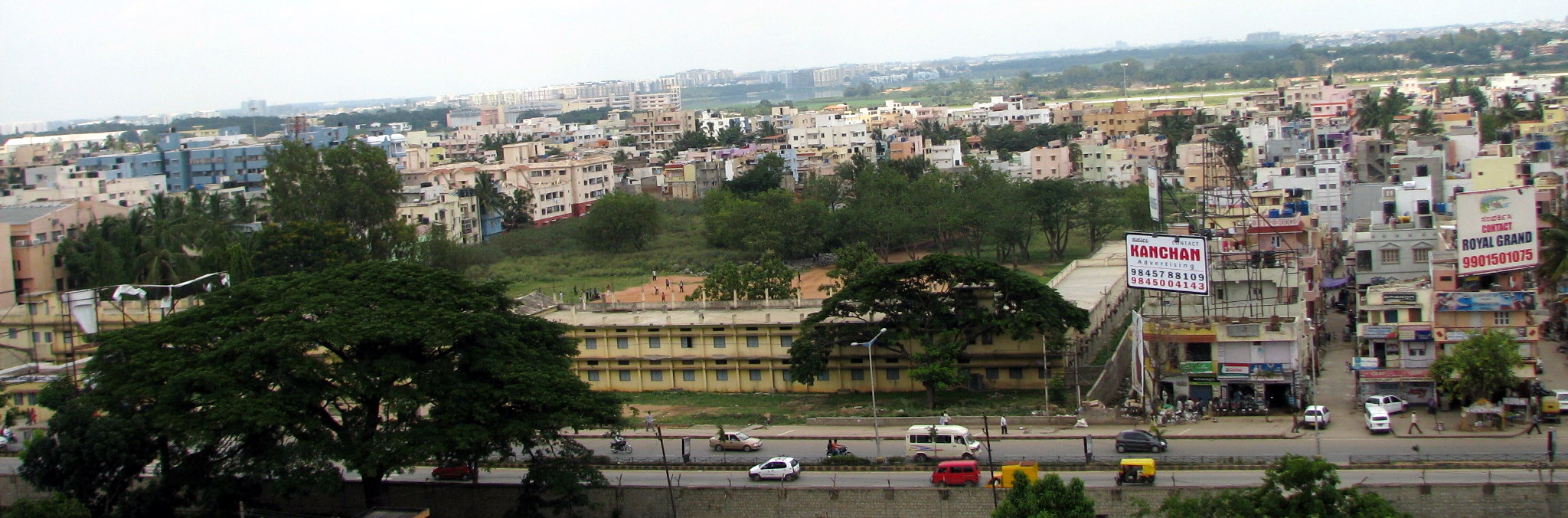
View of Visveswaraya college.
