= NAL Wind Tunnel Road =

Coordinates: 12°56′51.25″N 77°39′27.57″E

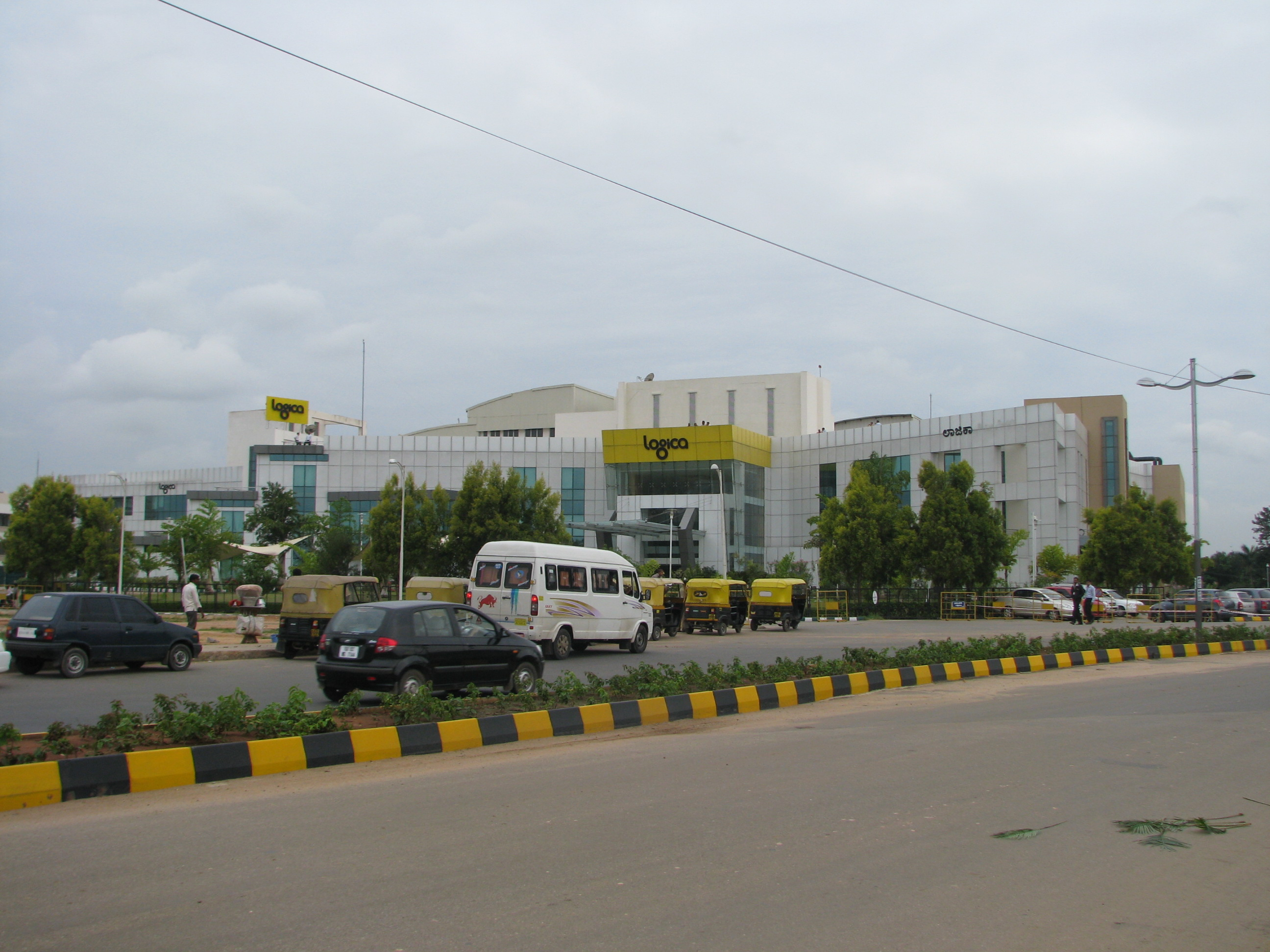
Embassy Golf Links district at NAL Wind Tunnel Road

NAL Wind Tunnel Road, expanded as National Aerospace Laboratories Wind Tunnel Road, is a road in the Murugeshpalya locality of Bengaluru. It was called Challaghatta Road, a name that still persists in local use, before it was renamed. It links HAL Airport Road with Bellandur. HAL Airport Road branches into Wind Tunnel Road at a traffic light junction.

== Road condition ==
The condition of this road has been a subject of constant criticism. Some of the common complaints are: poor condition of the road, occupied footpaths, irregular clearing of garbage etc. Between 2012 and 2014, 366 complaints were lodged about the HAL-Marathahalli stretch, including Wind Tunnel Road and Suranjan Das Road. According to the local residents, the local authority did not pay enough attention to resolve the issues. However, in September 2014, before Indian Prime Minister Narendra Modi's visit, the road was repaired and garbage were cleared.

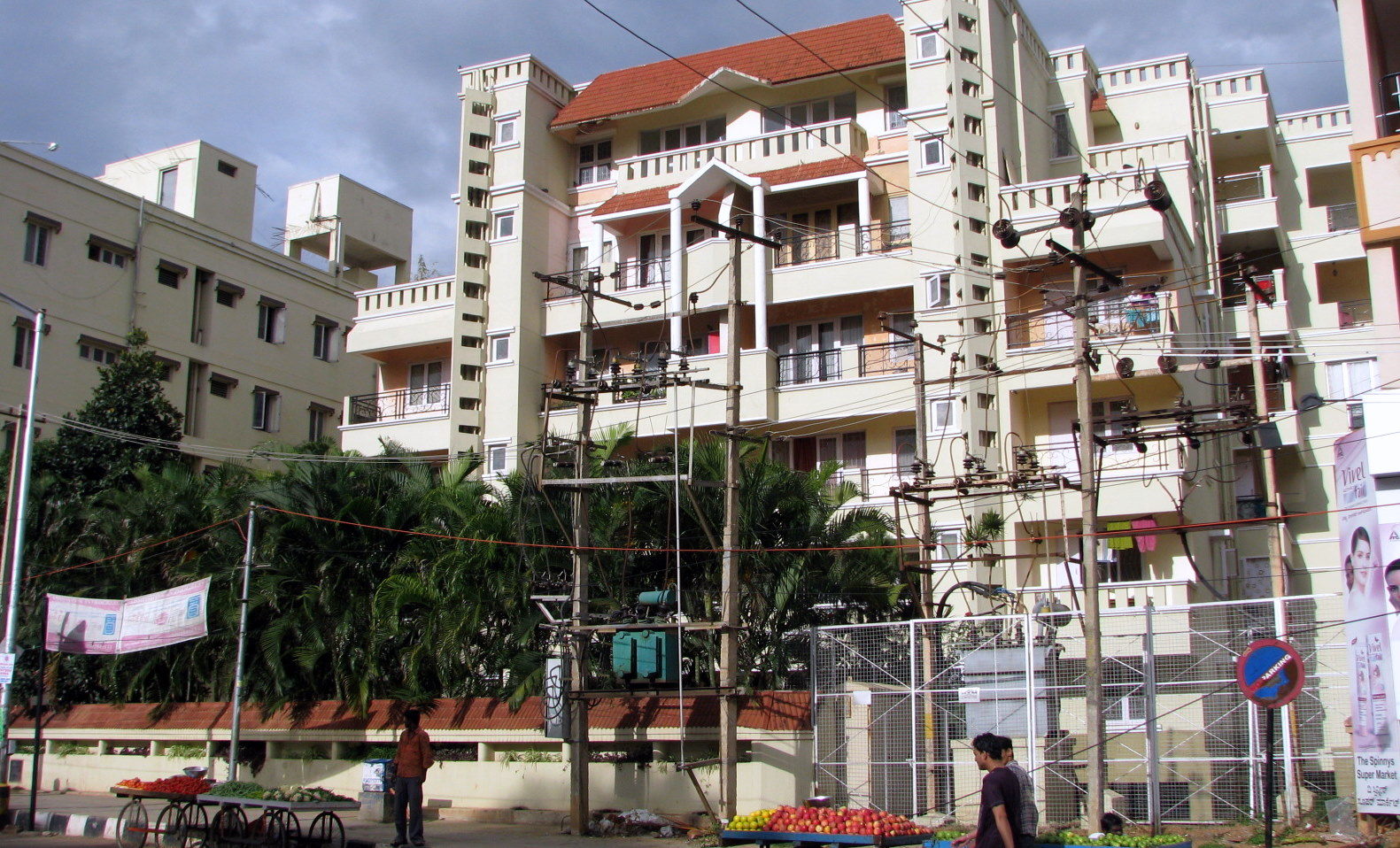
An apartment on NAL Wind Tunnel Road

According to a report published in the Bangalore Mirror in July 2015, there were illegal garbage dumps in the road, and the authorities of Sophia School, a school located on this road were anxious about the health of the students studying there. According to another report published in The Economic Times in December 2015, the garbage collection point of this road was like an "open dump yard".

In mid-2015, in the course of some construction work, Bangalore Water Supply and Sewerage Board dumped large pipes on the footpaths of Wind Tunnel Road encroaching over a length of 2 kilometres of the road. This became a serious issue for pedestrians and the local residents, who were forced to walk on the main road ignoring traffic. On the other hand, the traffic movement on the road was also slow, due to poor condition of the streets. Deccan Herald reported in November 2015 that the condition of the footpaths were dangerous for pedestrians at that time.

One of the major issues is the increased traffic on this road by citizens opting to use this road as an alternative to reach Indiranagar from the fast developing HSR and areas south of Bellandur lake. To add to their woes, Parking of tempos is 'allowed' on the road resulting in long waiting times at the Airport Road junction traffic signal. The Ola cabs office on this road has resulted in a massive Ola cab explosion with no discipline being maintained.

In 2015, Bruhat Bengaluru Mahanagara Palike (BBMP) proposed to construct an underpass here to address traffic problem. However the authority faced difficulties to execute the plan because of land-acquisition issues.

On 17 October 2026, citizens and the Greater Bengaluru Authority (GBA) joined a cleanup and beautification drive along Wind Tunnel Road and NAL Road in Bengaluru. The initiative, carried out by Bengaluru Central City Corporation in collaboration with India Rising Trust, involved removing accumulated garbage and debris and painting roadside walls under the “Freedom from Waste” and “Just Clean Bengaluru” campaigns. Officials also discussed measures to address potholes, streetlight maintenance and recurring illegal dumping.
