= Doug (album) =

Studio album by the Coolies
- Released: 1988
- Genre: Rock
- Label: DB
- Producer: Brendan O'Brien

The Coolies chronology
dig..? (1986)	Doug (1988)	Take That You Bastards! (1995)

Doug is the second album by the American band the Coolies, released in 1988. It is a concept album and rock opera about a skinhead punk kid, Doug, who pilfers recipes from a drag queen, publishes them as his own, and becomes famous and wealthy while worrying about his comeuppance. The band supported the album with a North American tour. Doug was adapted as a stage musical in 1997.

== Production ==
The album was produced by Brendan O'Brien, his first production job. It was recorded in less than a week for around $2,000. The Coolies were unconcerned about their reputation as a joke band, preferring to keep their music humorous, unserious, and entertaining. A comic book, drawn by Jack Logan, was included with the LP release. "Cook Book" includes musical references to the Who's "Substitute", "Happy Jack", and "Won't Get Fooled Again". "Coke Light Ice", a rant about fast food, is performed in a Southern jangle pop style. The drag queen character's name is Cookie Puss, an homage to the Beastie Boys song. "Crack Pipe (Burnin' My Hand)", like the Beatles' "Helter Skelter", ends with a howl of "I got blisters on my fingers".

== Critical reception ==
Professional ratings
Review scores
Source	Rating
AllMusic	4/5 stars
Chicago Tribune	3/4 stars

The St. Petersburg Times said, "If Dig? ... was a loud, new-wave frat party, then Doug is a thinking man's blowout. The parodies are more subtle, the musical ideas are more developed and as a result, its turntable life should be longer than its manic predecessor." The Chicago Tribune called the album "an adequate-to-good mix of hard rock and mellow rock behind lyrics that advance the story without sounding like a narrative recitation." The Boston Globe opined, "These are solid, witty, hook-packed tunes. 'Crack Pipe', in particular, is a histrionic hard rock delight, as guitarist Teddy Murray wails away into the abyss."

The Washington Post noted that "even the slowest rock fan should appreciate the dead-on musical parodies". LA Weekly called the album "the best plot-rock disc since the Bonzo Dog Band's semi-parodic Keynsham." The State said that Doug is a "masterpiece" of "no-holds-barred rock".

In 2010, the Iowa City Press-Citizen, as part of its "Great Albums Revisited" series, labeled the Coolies an "extraordinary, high-concept metallic/pop machine". Trouser Press stated, "A quantum leap from its predecessor's one-dimensional silliness, Doug is a work of demented genius."

== Track listing ==
No.	Title	Length
1.	"Talkin' 'Bout Doug"
2.	"Ice Cold Soul"
3.	"Pussy Cook"
4.	"Cook Book"
5.	"Shirts and Skins"
6.	"Coke Light Ice"
7.	"Doug"
8.	"40 Foot Stretch"
9.	"The Last Supper"
10.	"Ain't Gonna Eat No More"
11.	"Crack Pipe (Burnin' My Hand)"
12.	"Poverty"
13.	"Talkin' 'Bout Doug" (reprise)
