= Bulk (album) =

Studio album by Jack Logan
- Released: 1994
- Genre: Indie rock
- Label: Medium Cool/Twin Tone
- Producer: Peter Jesperson

Jack Logan chronology
Bulk (1994)	Out of Whack EP (1995)

Bulk is the debut album by the American musician Jack Logan, released in 1994. The album's 42 songs were chosen by Twin/Tone's Peter Jesperson from a pool of around 600, recorded over a period of more than 10 years; Jesperson had been alerted to Logan by Peter Buck.

The album sold more than 17,000 copies in its first year of release.

== Production and release ==
The songs were taped on home recorders, with Logan's friend Kelly Keneipp and others. Logan penned the lyrics to the songs; around 17 musicians contributed to them over the years. Logan worked as a small motor repairman in Georgia during much of the recording of Bulk, and had started playing with the local band Liquor Cabinet.

The album was issued as two compact discs, although it was stylistically split up and ordered as nine LP record sides. It includes a cover of Neil Young's "On the Beach". Vic Chesnutt contributed vocals to "The Parishioners".

== Critical reception ==
Professional ratings
Review scores
Source	Rating
AllMusic	4.5/5 stars
The Encyclopedia of Popular Music	3/5 stars
Entertainment Weekly	A
MusicHound Folk: The Essential Album Guide	4/5 stars
USA Today	3/4 stars

Trouser Press wrote that Logan's "characters wear their humanity proudly, and their circumstances update the Southern Gothic morality of Flannery O’Connor to include the current society of the trailer park and the long-haul trucker." Spin declared that "sometimes the editorial sword should be stronger than the pen," but conceded that "a few songs hint of the discombobulation of Skip Spence's Oar." The New York Times deemed the album full of "raw, piercing songs about everything from self-destructive friends to Saturday-morning cartoons." The Chicago Tribune concluded that, "although Logan's no-frills honesty permeates every track, it doesn't all work; some tunes sound like pleasant half-ideas, while others sound like meandering, primitive jams in search of closure."

The Washington Post thought that Logan "writes about his own community—Bobbie Ann Mason's Southern working-class universe of Wal-Marts and rock-and-roll roadhouses—where folk art's peculiar blend of bluntness and quirkiness are present in the music as well as the lyrics." Entertainment Weekly stated that "Logan launches into a freewheeling Stones bash, slacker rock, mordant country, punishing thrash, and anything else that strikes his fancy." USA Today opined that "the adventurous Logan dishes out unpretentious rock with pop smarts, blues credibility, rockabilly spirit and lounge levity." Rolling Stone determined that "Logan's blithe modesty and budget-sound recording style are a big part of Bulk's formidable charm," and noted that the musician "made these tapes for the sheer joy and fraternal what-the-fuck of it, to get the words and melodies out of his head and into the hands of a few musician friends."

AllMusic wrote that "the songs are occasionally interesting but mostly derivative rock and R&B tunes."

== Track listing ==
Disc one
No.	Title	Length
1.	"Fuck Everything"
2.	"Shrunken Head"
3.	"Love, Not Lunch"
4.	"Female Jesus"
5.	"Escape Clause"
6.	"Underneath Your Bed"
7.	"Just Go Away"
8.	"Lazy Girl Blues"
9.	"New Used Car and a Plate of Bar-B-Que"
10.	"Opposite Direction"
11.	"15 Years in Indiana"
12.	"Heart Attack on the Prairie"
13.	"Optimist"
14.	"Voo Doo Doll"
15.	"Chloroform"
16.	"Vegetable Belt"
17.	"Aloha-Ha"
18.	"The Sweetest Fruit"
19.	"Lovely"
20.	"Sometimes It's You"
21.	"Monday Night"
22.	"Giant City, Tiny Town"
23.	"Graves Are Fun to Dig"
24.	"Floating Cowboy"

Disc two
No.	Title	Length
1.	"Peace o' Mind"
2.	"Shipbuilding Blues"
3.	"The Parishioners"
4.	"Would I Be Happy Then?"
5.	"Farsighted"
6.	"On the Beach"
7.	"Yes I Can"
8.	"Grey Steel Train"
9.	"Drunken Arms"
10.	"Good Times, Bad Memories"
11.	"Shit for Brains"
12.	"Heaven on Earth"
13.	"Idiot's Waltz"
14.	"Terminal Gate"
15.	"Weatherman"
16.	"Tex"
17.	"Cartoons"
18.	"Town Crier"
