= Clay Harper =

American writer

Clay Harper is a musician and restaurateur from Atlanta, Georgia. He is known for his work as a songwriter and frontman in the band the Coolies, and for co-founding the Atlanta-area restaurant chains Fellini's Pizza and La Fonda Latina. He also founded and owns the barbecue chain the Greater Good.

== Biography ==
Harper began his musical career when he co-founded the Coolies in the 1980s. He subsequently founded the band Ottoman Empire in the 1990s. At one point, its members included Daniel Pearl. During the 1990s, he also released two albums (one solo and one with his brother, Mark) on his own label, Casino Music. In 2012, his children's book Are You Sure That Was a Rabbit? was published.

=== Career as a restaurateur ===
With Mike Nelson, Harper co-founded Fellini's Pizza in 1982, and co-founded La Fonda Latina, a restaurant that frequently is located next to Fellini's. He later founded the frozen yogurt chain Three on the Tree in the summer of 2010. He also founded the barbecue chain The Greater Good, which opened its first location in Tucker, Georgia in 2012.

== Discography ==
=== Solo ===
- East of Easter (Casino Music, 1997)
- Old Airport Road (Terminus, 2013)
- Bleak Beauty (Clay Harper, 2016)
- Dirt Yard Street (Clay Harper, 2020)
- They’ll Never Miss a Five (Clay Harper, 2022)

=== With Mark Harper ===
- The Slippery Ballerina (Casino Music, 1999)
- Not Dogs ... Too Simple (A Tale of Two Kitties) (Casino Music, 2000)
