= Mood Elevator =

Studio album by Jack Logan & Liquor Cabinet
- Released: January 16, 1996
- Recorded: A barn in Royal Center, Indiana, over a 10-day period
- Genre: Rock music
- Length: 46:31
- Label: Medium Cool/Restless
- Producer: Peter Jesperson, Kelly Keneipp

Jack Logan & Liquor Cabinet chronology
Bulk (1994)	Mood Elevator (1996)	Little Private Angel (1998)

Mood Elevator is the second album by the Winder, Georgia-based singer-songwriter Jack Logan, recorded in conjunction with a group of musicians known as Liquor Cabinet. It was released on January 16, 1996, on both Medium Cool Records (a Twin/Tone imprint) and Restless Records. As of 1999, it had sold 12,000 copies.

== Background and recording ==
Logan began writing songs in the 1980s, when virtually no one but him and his close friends knew about his musical career. He became famous after he was introduced to Peter Jesperson, the former manager of the Replacements, by Peter Buck, who picked 42 of his favorite songs of the hundreds Logan had written at that point. These songs were then released on Twin/Tone Records, in the form of the 1994 album Bulk. This same pool of songs was tapped into for the 17 tracks on Mood Elevator. With regard to songwriting, Logan has said he considers his own life too uninteresting to write songs about, and so focuses on writing songs based on fictional characters instead.

Unlike Logan's debut album, Bulk, the 17 songs on Mood Elevator were recorded in a 16-track studio that had been set up in a friend's barn in the small town of Royal Center, Indiana. During the first night of recording, Logan recalls wanting to test out the equipment, after which a member of Liquor Cabinet soon wrote a guitar part. Logan then wrote some lyrics to go with it, and the session ended up producing three of Mood Elevator's songs, which Logan wanted to record then because he was "aching to go". Logan and Liquor Cabinet recorded a total of 36 songs in 10 days during the sessions. Half the album's songs were written prior to the start of recording, and the other half were written in the studio.

== Production ==
The album was co-produced by Peter Jesperson, who originally discovered Logan and picked out his favorite songs out of more than 600 to release as Logan's debut album, Bulk. This became Logan's big break, leading to appearances on The Today Show and Late Night With Conan O'Brien. The other producer on Mood Elevator was Kelly Keneipp, who also performed guitar and keyboard on the album.

== Single ==
The album's first single was the song "Neon Tombstone", for which Logan also animated a video.

== Critical reception ==
Professional ratings
Review scores
Source	Rating
AllMusic	4.5/5 stars
Chicago Tribune	3/4 stars
Entertainment Weekly	A
Los Angeles Times	2.5/4 stars
Orlando Sentinel	4/5 stars
USA Today	3.5/4 stars

Mood Elevator, like Bulk, received overwhelmingly favorable reviews from critics, including a four-star review from Rolling Stone, which they had also awarded to Bulk. It was also reviewed favorably in People, in which its music was described as almost identical to that of Bulk, and which concluded, "Logan and company may not get high marks for originality, but something's working here." Other favorable reviews included one in SF Weekly, where James Sullivan wrote that on Mood Elevator, "He [Logan] and his group identify the finer points of rock's more indulgent styles and condense them into hard, memorable nuggets," and one in the Boston Phoenix, which described the album's songs as "fascinating fragments of stories and thoughts that are too real to ignore." This critical acclaim led the Georgia House of Representatives to pass a bill commending Logan and Liquor Cabinet on March 15, 1996. Geoffrey Himes wrote in The Washington Post that Mood Elevator "...lacks the breathtaking breadth of Bulk, but it does boast half a dozen of Logan's finest efforts", and cited "Just Babies" and "Vintage Man" as among the album's best songs.

== Track listing ==
1. Teach Me the Rules
2. Unscathed
3. Chinese Lorraine
4. When It All Comes Down
5. My New Town
6. Ladies and Gentlemen
7. Just Babies
8. Sky Won't Fall
9. No Offense
10. Another Life
11. Estranged
12. Neon Tombstone
13. What's Tickling You
14. What Was Burned
15. Vintage Man
16. Suicide Doors
17. Bleed

== Personnel ==
- David Barbe—Editing, Engineer, Mixing
- John Fields—Mastering, Mixing
- Michael Gibson—Composer
- Peter Jesperson—Producer
- Kelly Keneipp—Composer, Guitar, Guitar (Acoustic), Guitar (Electric), Guitar (Rhythm), Piano, Producer
- Jack Logan—Artwork, Composer, Primary Artist, Vocals, Vocals (Background)
- Jennifer Ménard—Photography
- Dave Philips—Composer, Guitar, Guitar (Acoustic), Guitar (Electric), Guitar (Rhythm)
- Aaron Phillipps—Drums
- Aaron Phillips—Composer
- Jamie Rouch—Engineer
- Terry Rouch—Composer, Guitar, Guitar (Electric), Maracas, Percussion, Vocals (Background)
- Eric Sales—Bass, Composer, Guitar, Percussion, Vocals (Background)
- Jay Smiley—Photography
- Paul Stark—Engineer, Mastering
