= Fellini's Pizza =

- Interactive map of Fellini's Pizza

Restaurant information
- Established: May 5, 1982; 44 years ago
- Owners: Mike Nelson & Clay Harper
- Food type: Italian, Pizza
- Dress code: Casual
- Location: 7 locations, Atlanta, Georgia, United States
- Coordinates: 33°45′54″N 84°20′02″W
- Website: FellinisAtlanta.com

Fellini's Pizza is an Italian restaurant founded in Atlanta, Georgia on May 5, 1982 by Clay Harper of the Coolies and Mike Nelson. It has 7 locations and is known for its Atlanta style pizza. Its first location was near Little Five Points. It was voted "best pizza" in 2013 by The Emory Wheel.

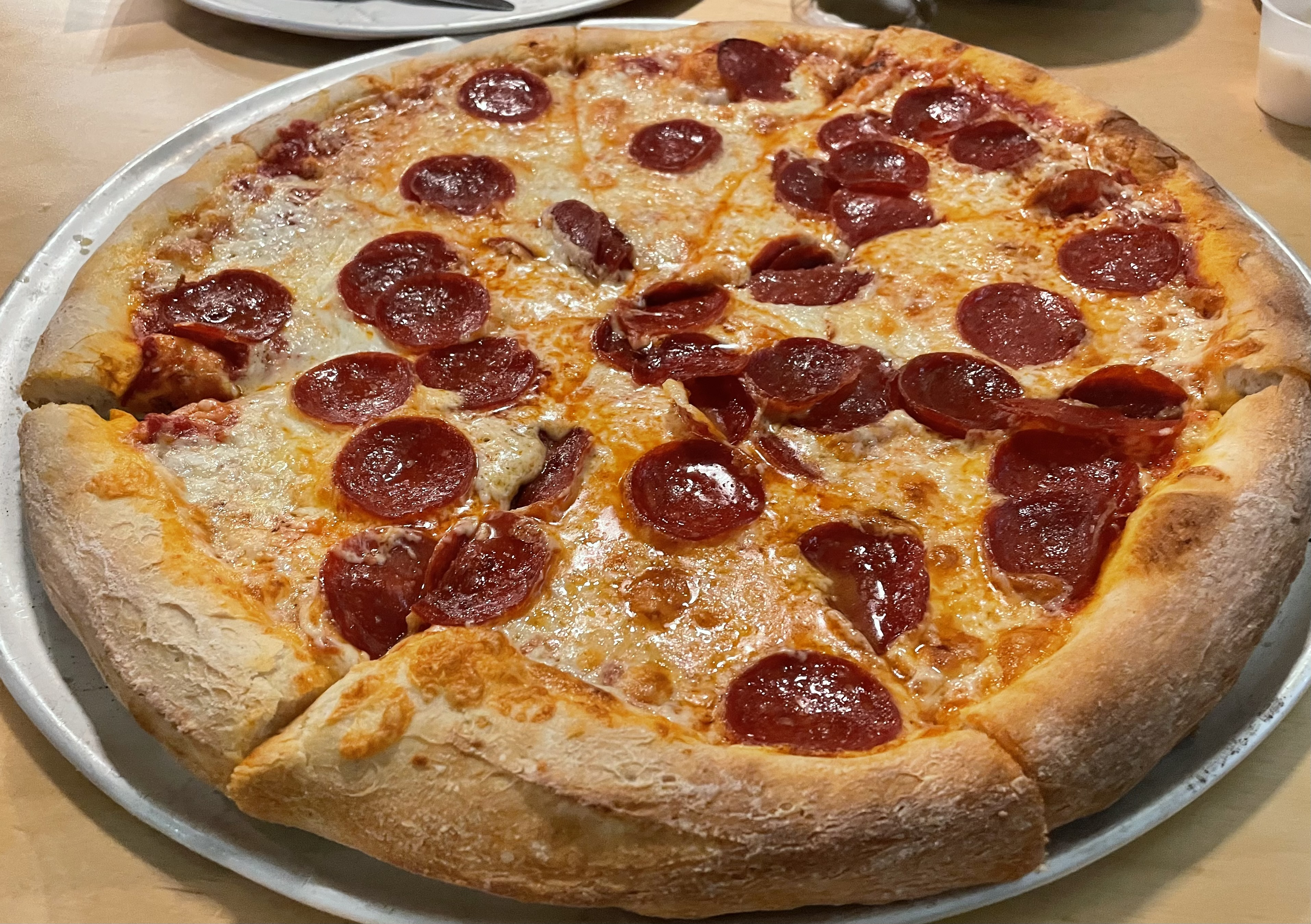
Fellini's pizza with pepperoni
