= C. P. Krishnan Nair =

Indian businessman (1922–2014)

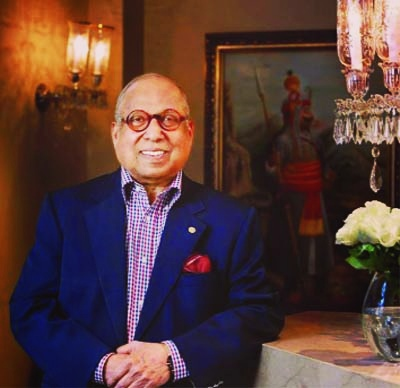
- Born: 9 February 1922; Malabar District, Madras Presidency, British India (present day Kannur, Kerala, India)
- Died: 17 May 2014 (aged 92); Mumbai, Maharashtra, India
- Occupation: Founder The Leela Group
- Spouse: Leela Nair (m. 1950–2014)
- Children: 2
- Military career
- Allegiance: British India (1942–47); India (1947–51)
- Branch: Indian Army
- Service years: 1942–1951
- Rank: Captain
- Unit: Maratha Light Infantry

Captain Chittarath Poovakkatt Krishnan Nair (9 February 1922 – 17 May 2014) was an Indian businessman who founded The Leela Group. He was a 2010 recipient of the Padma Bhushan, given by Government of India. He was sometimes popularly known as Captain Nair due to his service in the Indian Army.

== Early life and military career ==
Nair was born in a village in Kannur district in northern Kerala on 9 February 1922. At the time the village was located in the Malabar District of the Madras Presidency of the British Raj. Nair was one of eight children. His father, Appu Nair, worked as a government bill collector earning a monthly income of ₹9 (equivalent to ₹2,000 or US$21 in 2026). During a visit by the Maharaja of Chirakkal to his school, Nair wrote and recited a poem in the Maharaja's honour. The poem impressed the Maharaja and he awarded Nair a lifetime scholarship. During his teenage years Nair met Communist leaders such as P. Krishna Pillai and A.K. Gopalan.

Nair joined the Indian independence movement at the age of 13. He traveled to Bangalore in 1942 to join the Indian Army, and was posted as wireless officer in Abbottabad (in present-day Pakistan). He became an aid of Netaji Shubhash Chandra Bose and later came in close contact with leaders of Indian Freedom Movement. He rose to the rank of Captain in the Maratha Light Infantry.

== Later career ==
After resigning from the Army in 1951, Nair helped establish the All India Handloom Board. At the board he played a major role in marketing hand-spun Indian yarn in the United States. Through frequent business trips to Europe and the United States, Nair gained exposure to international hotels such as Adlon Kempinski, Dorchester, Savoy, George V and Waldorf-Astoria, which would inspire his own eventual entry into the hospitality industry.

In 1958, he joined hands with Brooks Brothers to announce Bleeding Madras fabric, which later had clients like Tommy Hilfiger, Wal-Mart, Liz Claiborne and Macy's.

Later that year, he started a lace-weaving unit in Sahar, Mumbai.

=== Leela Hotels ===
In 1957, Nair was part of a delegation of the All India Handloom Board to West Germany, which involved visits to Frankfurt, Cologne, Munich and Hamburg. Following his stay at the Kempinsky Hotel in Budapest, he realized the need for a luxury hotel chain in India that could measure up to international standards. With the Sahar International Airport opening in 1981, Nair realized that there were no good hotels in Andheri, the Mumbai suburb where the airport is located. Nair established Hotel Leelaventure Ltd. in 1983, and began construction of a hotel in Sahar on 4-acre plot of land that he owned, and an additional 6.5 acres that he leased.

The first Leela Hotel opened in Mumbai in 1987. This was followed by the Leela Palace in Bangalore, The Leela Goa, and the Leela Beach Resort in Thiruvananthapuram.

== Awards ==
The American Academy of Hospitality Sciences (AAHS) conferred him a Lifetime Achievement Award and the United Nations Environment Programme (UNEP) awarded him the Global 500 Roll of Honour award in 1999. Eventually he was awarded the Padma Bhushan, by Government of India in 2010. He was also awarded the "Hotelier of The Century" Award by International Hotels and Restaurant Association, based in Geneva, Switzerland, in 2009. He stepped down as the chairman of Hotel Leela on 7 February 2013 and was succeeded by his eldest son, Vivek Nair.

== Death ==
Krishnan Nair died at 3:30 AM IST on 17 May 2014 at the Hinduja Hospital in Mumbai, following a brief illness.

== Personal life ==
Nair married Leela (after whom he named his hotel group), the daughter of industrialist A. K. Nair, in 1950. They had two sons, Vivek Nair and Dinesh Nair. Vivek is the current chairman and managing director of the Leela Group, while Dinesh is the co-chairman of Leela group. Nair is a relative of V. P. Menon, an Indian civil servant who was the Constitutional Adviser and Political Reforms Commissioner to the last three Viceroys during British rule in India. Leela Krishnan Nair died on 16 May 2021, a day before her husband's seventh death anniversary.
