= Kodihalli, Bengaluru =

Locality in Bengaluru, Karnataka, India

Kodihalli is a locality in the eastern part of Bangalore. It starts from 80 feet Indiranagar, Jeevanbhima Nagar junction and extends up to Leela Palace on Old Airport Road. Until the late 1990s, Kodihalli was just an undistinguished village on the way to HAL Airport, but since then it has seen extraordinary real estate growth owing to its proximity to offices on Old Airport Road. It is surrounded by well established areas like Thippasandra, Indiranagar and Domlur. It is about 4 km from M.G road. The nearest railway station is at Krishnarajapuram which is roughly 7 km.
