= The Leela =

Indian luxury hotel chain

The Leela Palaces, Hotels and Resorts

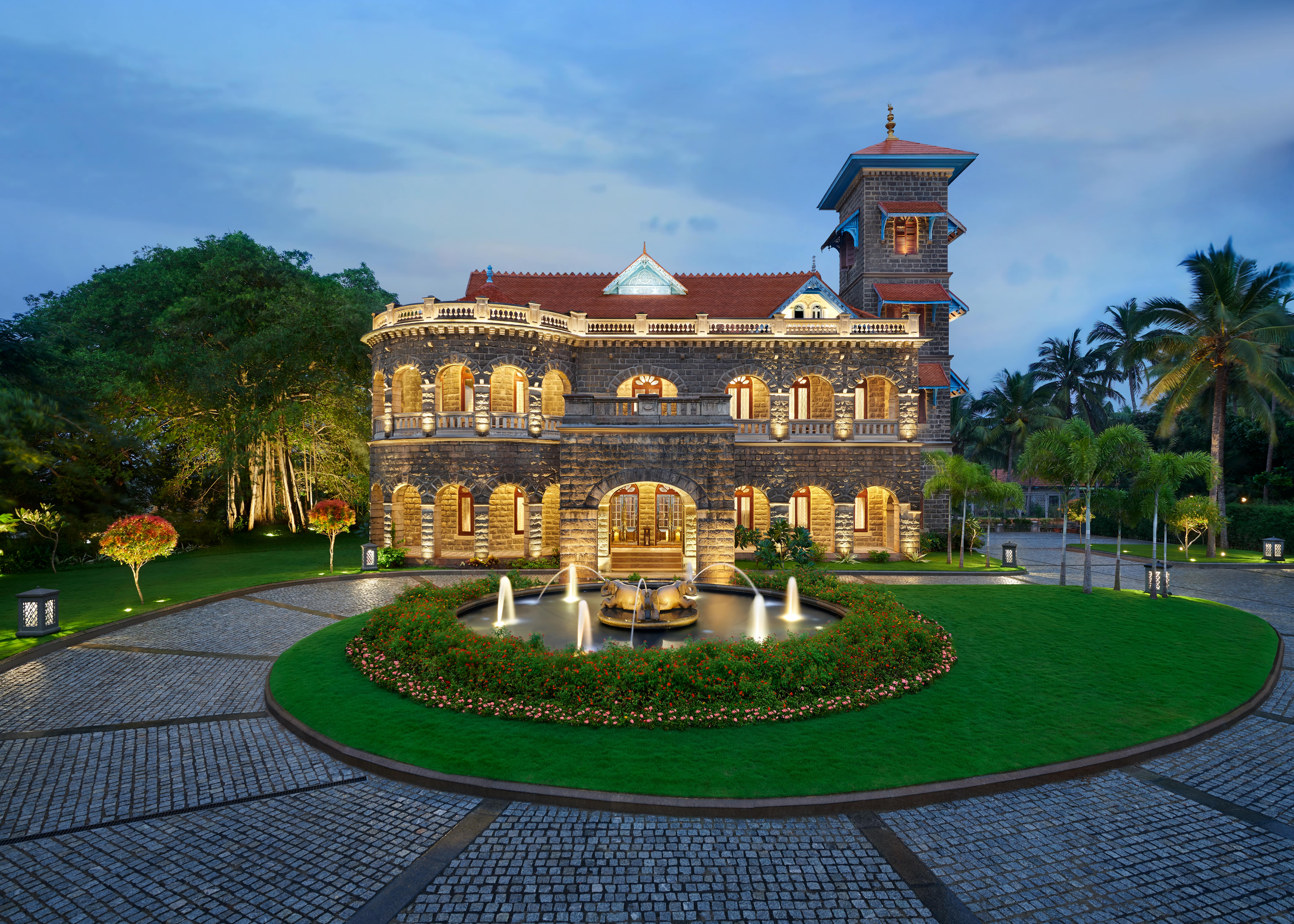
- The Leela Kovalam
- Type: Public
- Traded as: NSE: THELEELA; BSE: 544408
- Industry: Hospitality
- Founded: Mumbai, India (1986)
- Founder: C. P. Krishnan Nair
- Headquarters: Mumbai, India
- Products: Hotels and resorts
- Revenue: ₹714 crore (US$74 million) (2017)
- Owner: Brookfield Asset Management
- Website: www.theleela.com

The Leela Palaces, Hotels and Resorts is an Indian luxury hotel chain founded in 1986 by C. P. Krishnan Nair and currently owned by Brookfield Asset Management.

== History ==
The Leela Palaces, Hotels and Resorts were founded as part of The Leela Group, which was named after the founder C. P. Krishnan Nair's wife. Capt. Nair bought 11 acres of land near his house in Sahar Village, Mumbai to build his first hotel, The Leela Mumbai, in 1986. It was the first luxury hotel near the current Chhatrapati Shivaji International Airport. To market the hotel better, Nair joined hands with the Penta group, owned by a consortium of European airlines. The hotel was thus named Leela Penta, for a brief period, before being renamed to Leela Kempinski, and ultimately back to Leela Mumbai. The Penta group owned the Kempinski hotel chain at that time.

Headquartered in Mumbai, The Leela Palaces, Hotels and Resorts is owned by a Brookfield Asset Management-sponsored private real estate fund and operates twelve award-winning properties in major cities and leisure destinations across India. These include the flagship hotel in the capital city of New Delhi, Bengaluru, Chennai, Udaipur, Jaipur, Gurugram, East Delhi, Mumbai, Gandhinagar, Kovalam and Ashtamudi.

In 2001, the group's first modern hotel was built with 357 rooms in the IT capital of India, Bangalore, inspired by the Mysore Palace and the architecture of the 13th century Vijayanagara empire, and is surrounded by seven acres of gardens. By 2009, two more properties were added to this portfolio: The Leela Palace in Udaipur (Rajasthan) and The Leela Ambience Gurgaon.

The Leela Gandhinagar hotel above Gandhinagar Capital railway station

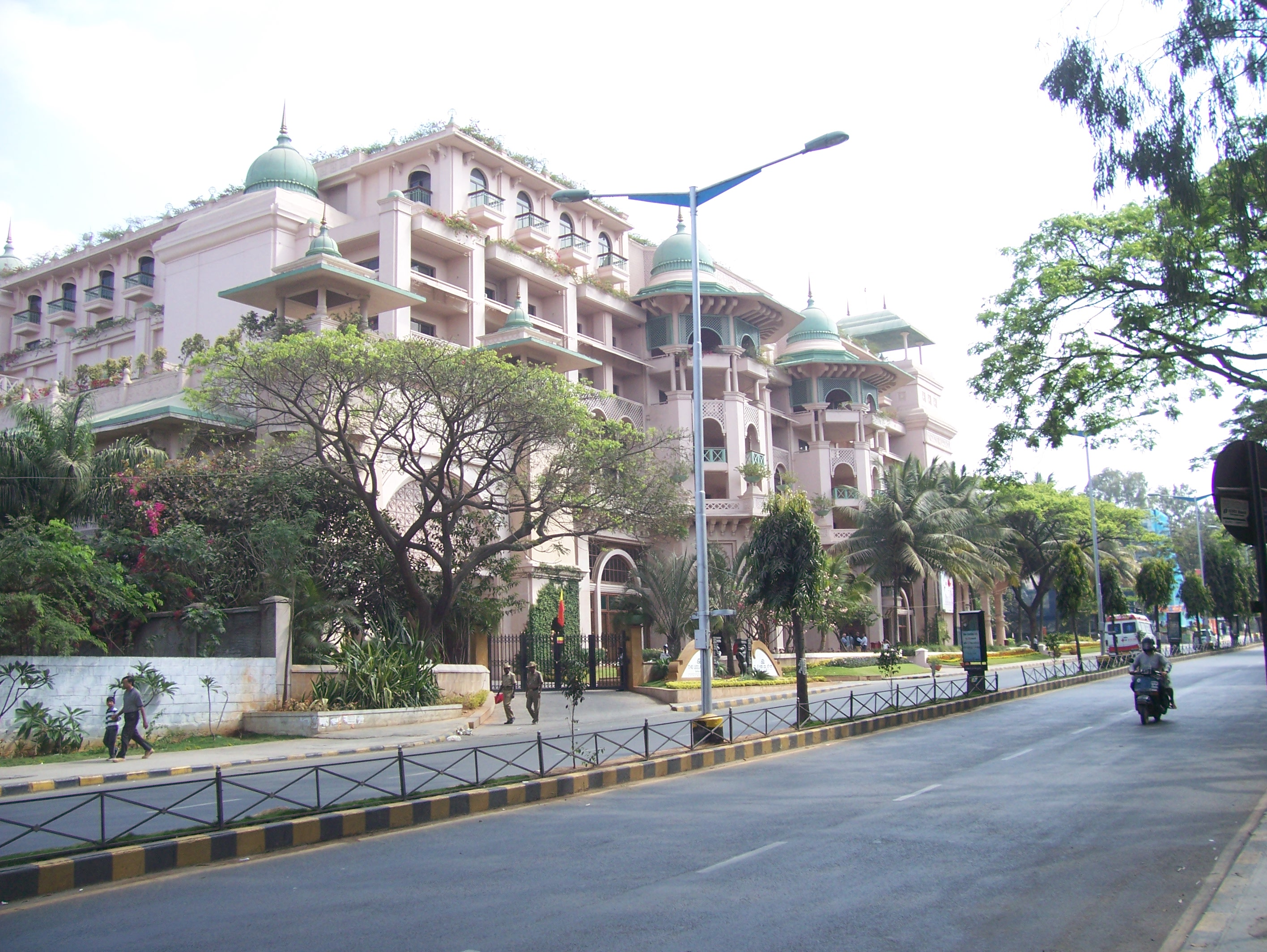
The Leela Palace, Bangalore

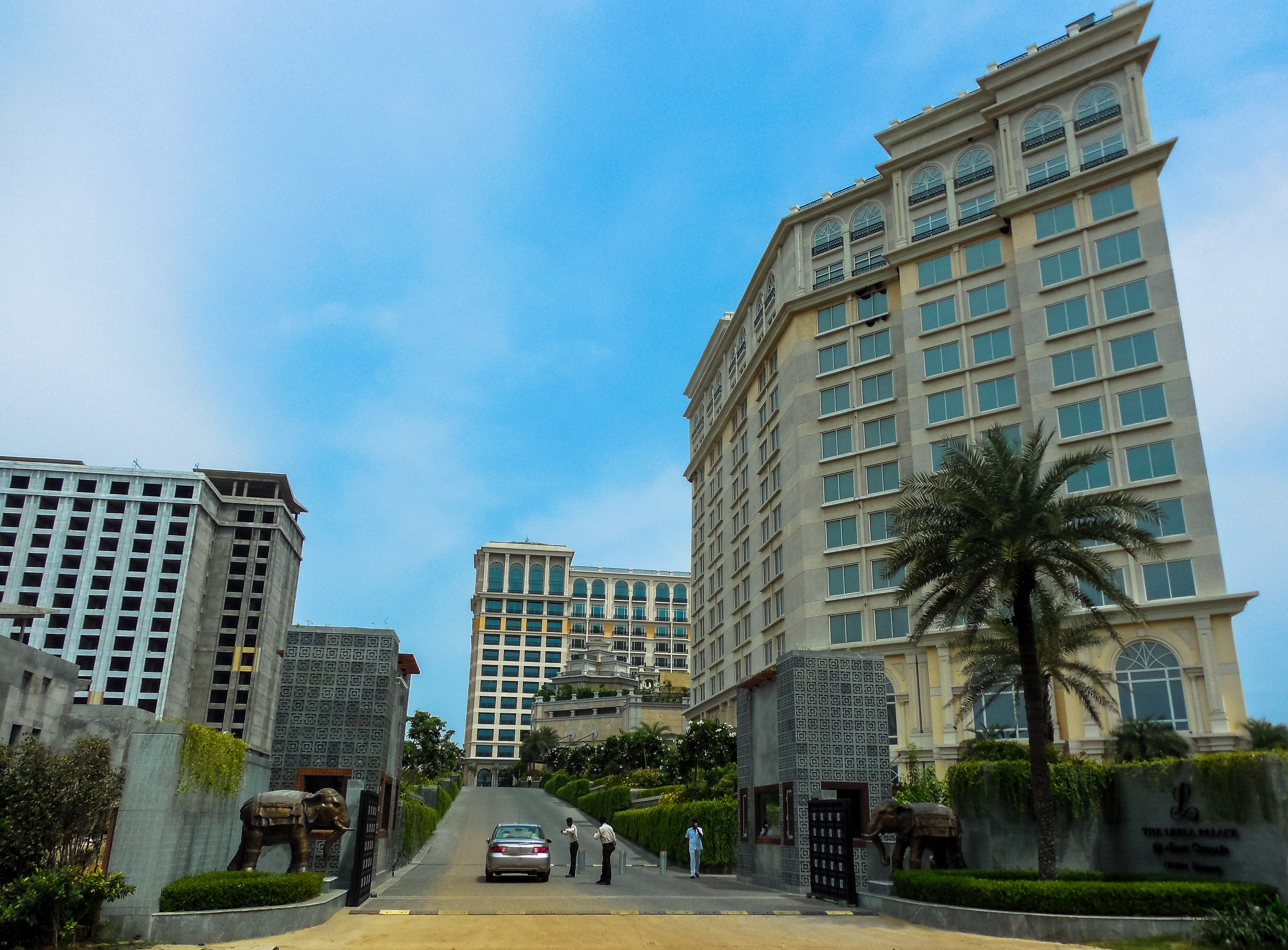
The Leela Palace, Chennai

The Leela Ambience Gurgaon Hotel & Residences is the group's first non-owned, managed property. The Leela Palace New Delhi opened in April 2011; the palace is inspired by Sir Edwin Lutyens Delhi. The group opened a new hotel in Chennai in 2013 called The Leela Palace Chennai. The second Managed hotel was taken over in year 2015, in East Delhi, The Leela Ambience Convention Hotel. In 2021, the group further expanded its portfolio with three new hotels; The Leela Palace Jaipur, The Leela Gandhinagar and The Leela Bhartiya City Bengaluru. There are plans to open new hotels in Hyderabad, Sikkim and Agra.

The brand has marketing alliances with US-based Preferred Hotels and Resorts and is a member of Global Hotel Alliance based in Dubai. A previous marketing alliance with Swiss-based Kempinski ended in October 2013.

In a deal in October 2019, the company sold its hotel properties and operations as well as hotel assets located in New Delhi, Bengaluru, Chennai, Udaipur to Canada-based Brookfield Asset Management, in an INR 3,950 crore settlement, marking the entry of Brookfield in India’s hospitality market.

ITC Group had objected to the sale of Leela owned hotels citing reasons of misappropriation of funds in the sale transaction which was led by the consortium of banks and also due to the fact the interests of minority shareholders were overlooked, and other bids submitted by interested bidders were not considered by JM Financial, the asset reconstruction company in Mumbai. The Securities Appellate Tribunal in September 2019 rejected the petition of ITC clearing the way for Brookfield to acquire the hotels.

In addition to ITC, there were other suitors for the Leela Hotels & Resorts, including that of Rashid Al-Habtoor a UAE businessman jointly with an Arms Dealer Abhishek Verma who submitted their bid of US$600 million in January 2019 however their bids were not entertained and questions were raised on the conduct of JM Financial in this sale transaction.

In June 2026, it opened The Leela Coorg Forest Sanctuary in Madikeri, Karnataka.

== Business structure ==
The Leela Palaces, Hotels and Resorts is the trading name of Leela Palaces and Resorts Limited. Hotel Leelaventure Limited is the ultimate holding company of the hotel group, and is traded on the Bombay Stock Exchange (BSE: 500193) and National Stock Exchange of India (NSE: HLVLTD). Hotel Leelaventure Limited is itself part of The Leela Group business conglomerate.

== Awards ==
- Travel + Leisure USA World’s Best Awards – The Leela Palaces, Hotels and Resorts ranked the fifth best hospitality brand in the world, July 2016
- Experiential Venue Awards 2017 – The Leela Palaces, Hotels & Resorts wins the 'India's Favorite Hospitality Group For MICE & Weddings', July 2017
- Travel + Leisure USA World’s Best Awards – The Leela Palaces, Hotels and Resorts ranked in Top 10 best hotels Brands in the world, July 2019
- Travel + Leisure USA World’s Best Awards 2024 – #3 World’s Best Hotel Brand

== See also ==
- The Leela Palace Chennai
- The Leela Ashtamudi
