= Old Airport Road =

2013 album by Clay Harper

Studio album by Clay Harper
- Released: April 2, 2013
- Length: 51:50
- Label: Terminus Records

Clay Harper chronology
East of Easter (1997)	Old Airport Road (2013)

Professional ratings
Review scores
Source	Rating
Robert Christgau	(A−)

Old Airport Road is the second solo album by Clay Harper (formerly of the Coolies and founder of Fellini's Pizza, located in Atlanta). It features a cover of Beautiful. Glenn Phillips appears on track 7 as a featured artist.

== Track listing ==
1. Ole Ray
2. Roly Poly
3. Crazy
4. Get that Money
5. Beautiful
6. Fuck Who You Want
7. Old Airport Road
8. I Can Find You At The Airport
9. They Played Amazing Grace

== Musicians ==
- Clay Harper (vocals)
- Kevin McFoy Dunn (guitar)
- James Cobb (bass, keyboards)
- Paul Barrie (drums)
- Mike Barry (trumpet)
- Mark Bencuya (piano)
- Eric Fontaine (saxophone)
- Duane Trucks (drums on #2 and #6)
- Kevin Scott (bass on #2 and #6)
- Chris Case (piano on #2 and #6)
- Gary Lee Miller (drums on #8)
