= Jack Logan =

American singer-songwriter (born 1959)

Jack Logan (born February 8, 1959) is an American singer-songwriter born in Greenville, Mississippi and raised in Lawrenceville, Illinois. He began recording, however, after moving to Winder, Georgia. He created two comic books in the 1980s, starring Peter Buck of R.E.M. as a superhero, and the connection to Peter Buck led to Twin/Tone Records' Peter Jesperson's interest in releasing some of Logan's material. He also drew a comic book that was included with LP copies of the Coolies second album, Doug.

His first release was the critically acclaimed Bulk which contained 42 songs from the approximately 600 Logan had recorded from 1979 to 1993. Both Bulk and Logan's next album, Mood Elevator, received four stars in Rolling Stone. Logan has worked with Kelly Keneipp, Vic Chesnutt, Bob Kimbell, Kevin Lane, Aaron Phillips and Rob Keller. The backing band for his albums Buzz Me In and Monkey Paw albums was The Possibilities. His most recent releases are 2013's Bones in the Desert, a self-released vinyl LP recorded with Scott Baxendale, and 2015's What Is This Some Kind of Joke?, another vinyl-only release, this time recorded with The Roach Brothers.

Logan guest-starred as himself on a 1997 episode of Cartoon Network's Space Ghost Coast to Coast.

== Discography ==
1. Lava Treatment – Lake Eerie (1988)
2. Jack Logan – Bulk (1994)
3. Jack Logan – Out of Whack (7" 4-song E.P.) (1995)
4. Jack Logan – Mood Elevator (1996)
5. Jack Logan & Bob Kimbell – Little Private Angel (1998)
6. Jack Logan & Bob Kimbell – Little Private Demos (cassette only) (1998)
7. Jack Logan – Tinker (1998)
8. Jack Logan – Buzz Me In (1999)
9. Jack Logan – Bring Me the Head of Kelly Keneipp (1999)
10. Jack Logan – Monkey Paw (2001)
11. Jack Logan & Bob Kimbell – Woodshedding (2002)
12. Jack Logan – Nature's Assembly Line (2005)
13. Third Creature (with Jack Logan) – Orthodox Garage (2006)
14. Jack Logan and the Monday Night Recorders – Fundamentally Live at the 40 Watt (2006)
15. Jack Logan & Scott Baxendale – Bones in the Desert (2013)
16. Jack Logan and the Roach Brothers – What Is This Some Kind of Joke? (2015)
