= List of Chola temples in Bengaluru =

A stone sculpture in Chokkanathaswamy temple

The Chola dynasty was one of the longest-ruling dynasties in the history of southern India. In Bengaluru the Cholas ruled nearly a century. The heartland of the Cholas was the fertile valley of the Kaveri River, but they ruled a significantly larger area at the height of their power, including the present-day Bengaluru. During the reign of Rajaraja Chola I—around 1004 AD—the cholas captured Bengaluru after defeating the Gangas. During their rule, they built many temples in and around Bengaluru with the Chokkanathaswamy temple, Mukthi Natheshwara Temple, Choleswara temple and the Someshwara Temple being prominent ones. The Chokkanathaswamy temple at Domlur, whose earliest inscriptions date back to the 10th century AD, is the oldest temple in the city. Originally built by Raja Raja Chola I, the temple was later renovated by the Hoysalas and Vijayanagara rulers. The temple's deity was Lord Shiva, but later a Vishnu temple was built for the local residents who were mainly Vaishnavas.

The Chola Rule in Karnataka was curtailed with loss of Western Gangavadi in 1117 AD by the Hoysalas, but Eastern Gangavadi (part of Mysore district) was recovered by 1125 AD under Vikrama Chola and Chola territories in Kannada country existed till the rule of Emperor Kulothunga Chola III. However Tamil habitation in Karnataka, especially in Mysore district, precedes the Chola period and continued afterwards as well. Hoysala Kings built Someshwara temples throughout their kingdom. The typical Someshwara temple has a lotus pond or a taverekere included.

The Someshwara temple at Madiwala was built around 1247 AD. The Someshwara Temple at Halasuru, one of the oldest in the city. While the main deity is Nandi, other gods like Brahma and Vishnu are also worshiped here. It was later renovated by Kempegowda who built the Rajagopura and constructed walls around the temple. The 800 year-old Kaalikaamba Kamatheshwara Temple at Nagarathpet is the second largest temple in the city.

Apart from religious practices, the temples were utilized for scholarly activities thus providing employment for the people.

== List of temples ==
No.	Name	Locality	Period/Earliest inscription	Refs.
1	Domlur Chokkanathaswamy temple	Domlur	10th century AD	
2	Halasuru Someshwara Temple	Halasuru		
3	Eshwara Temple, Kengeri, Bengaluru	Kengeri	1050 AD	
4	Dharmesvara Temple	Kondrahalli	1065 AD	
5	Sri Madduramma Temple	Huskur	11th century AD	
6	Old Madiwala Someshwara Temple, Bengaluru	Madiwala	1247 AD	
7	Kaalikaamba Kamatheshwara Temple	Nagarathpet	13th century AD	
8	Someshwara Temple, Marathahalli	Marathahalli	1508 AD	
9	Sri Veerabhadra Swamy temple	Thindlu	10th Century AD	

== Bibliography ==
- De, Aditi (2008). Multiple city: writings on Bangalore. Penguin Books India. ISBN 978-0-14-310025-6.
- Mysore, India (Republic). Office of the Director of Census Operations; Padmanabha, P. (1973). District Census Handbook, Series 14, Mysore: Bangalore. Govt. Press.
- Rao, Saligrama Krishna Ramachandra (1993). Art and architecture of Indian temples. Kalpatharu Research Academy.
