= Tamil inscriptions of Bengaluru =

There are nearly a thousand inscriptions in Tamil in the Southern Karnataka districts of Bangalore, Mysore, Kolar and Mandya in India. Nearly one third of these inscriptions are found in the Kolar District. Of all the inscriptions collected and published in the Epigraphia Carnatica Vol X for Kolar district , a fourth are in Tamil. The Tamil inscriptions start to appear around 1000 AD, after the conquest of the region by the Chola dynasty king Rajaraja I. Even after the Cholas left the area, the Hoysala and later the Vijaynagar kingdoms continued to use Tamil in the inscriptions.

Tamil inscriptions are found south of the Pennar-Ponnaiyar divide, running south west from Bangalore to Mysore. Several Tamil inscriptions are found in the Honnu-Hole basin.

Numerous Tamil inscriptions can be found in the Bangalore Rural district, especially in the Nelamangala and Hoskote taluks. The Mukti Natheshwara temple at Nelmangala have Tamil inscriptions of Kulothunga Chola I, dating back to the 11 Century. At Kadugodi, there is one inscription from the period of Rajendra Chola's rule, that records donations for developing the Pattandur lake.

== Temple Inscriptions ==
Many Tamil inscriptions in Bangalore were compiled and documented by Benjamin Lewis Rice and appear in the Epigraphia Carnatica: Volume IX: Inscriptions in the Bangalore District

=== Inscriptions of Chokkanathaswamy Temple, Domlur ===
The Chokkanathaswamy Temple, located in Domlur is a 10th-century temple of Chola origin. There are a number of Tamil inscriptions in the temple. Domlur is called as Tombalur or Desimanikkapattanam in these inscriptions. Chakravarthi Posalaviraramanatha Deva has left inscriptions with directions to temple authorities of his kingdom. Further some inscriptions record the tributes, taxes and tolls made to the temple by Devaraya II of Vijayanagar Empire, which state the houses, wells, land around Tombalur were offered to the deity Sokkapperumal. Another Tamil inscription dated 1270 talks about 2 door posts being donated by Alagiyar. Yet another inscription in Tamil details Talaikkattu and his wife donating lands from Jalapalli village and Vinnamangalam tank to the deity. A 1290AD inscription talks about donation of ten pens from the revenue of Tommalur by Poysala vira Ramananda.

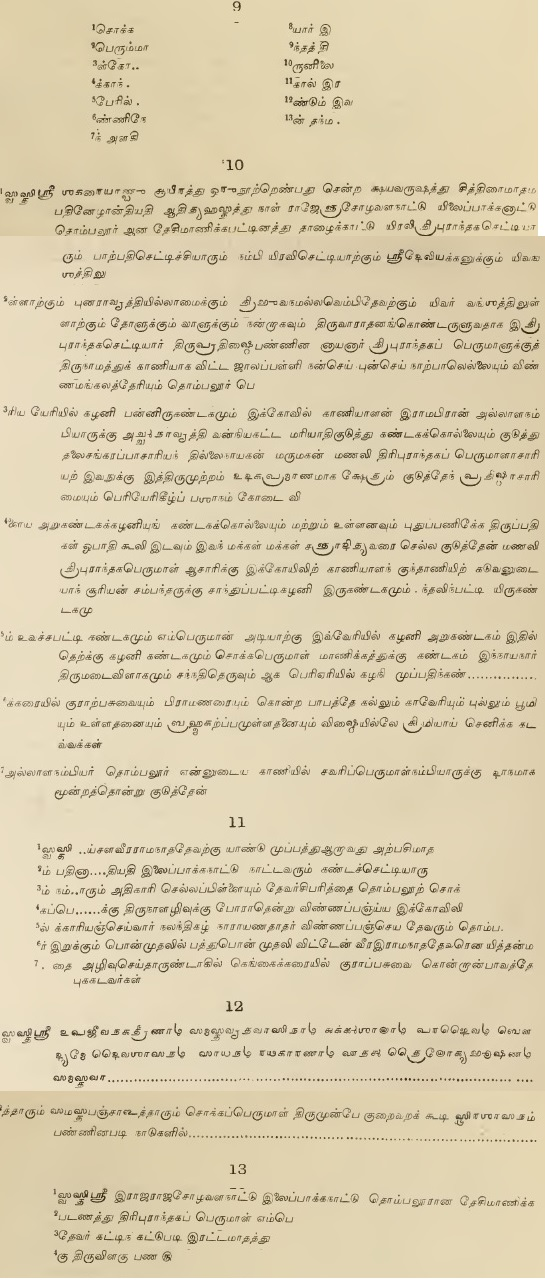
Tamil Inscriptions of the Domlur Chokkanathaswamy Temple, Bangalore

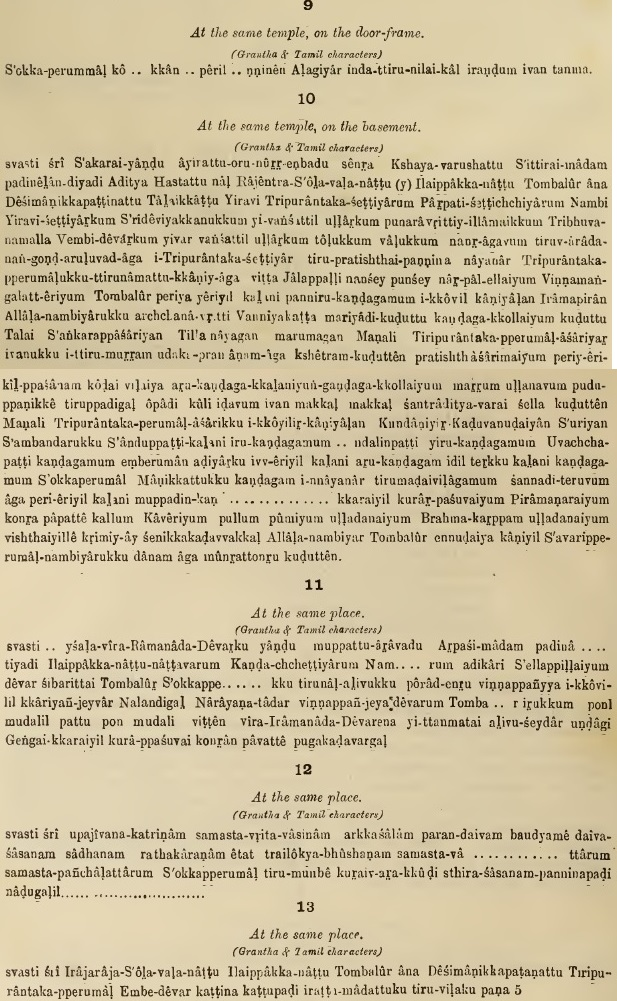
Roman Script of the Tamil Inscriptions of the Domlur Chokkanathaswamy Temple, Bangalore

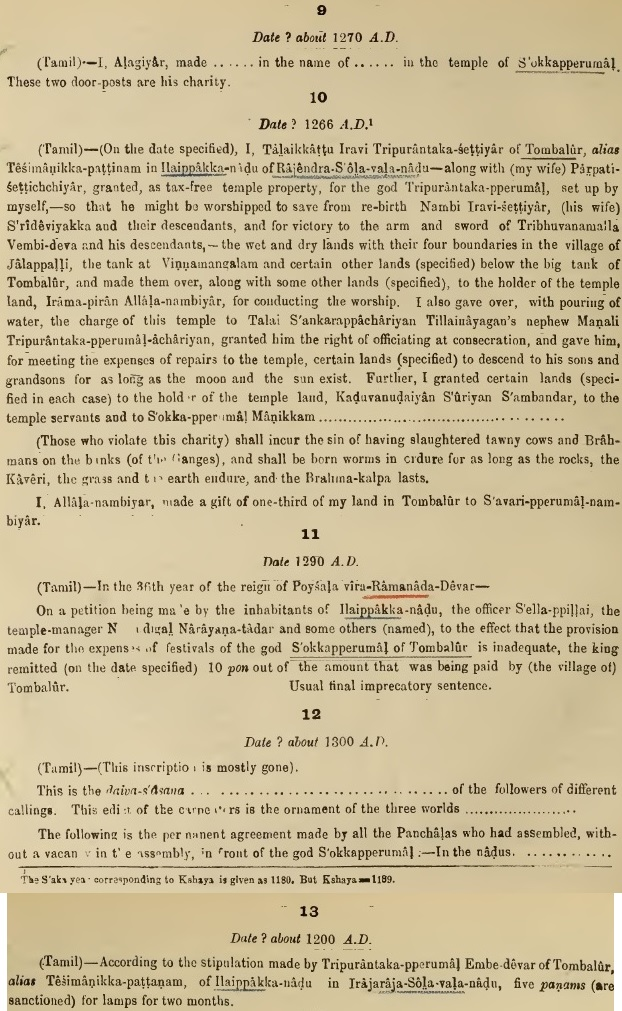
English Translations of the Tamil Inscriptions of the Domlur Chokkanathaswamy Temple, Bangalore

=== Someshwara Temple, Madivala ===
The Someshware temple at Madivala is one of Bangalore's oldest. There are a number of Tamil Grantha inscriptions on the outer walls of the temple. The oldest of these inscriptions dates to 1247 AD talks about a land grants "below the big tank of Vengalur" by a Veppur (modern Begur) resident. Other inscriptions also talk about other land grants including those done during the reigns of Ballala III . Another inscription dated 1365 talks about land grand at Tamaraikkirai (which translates to 'lotus pond bank' in Tamil), and according to HS Gopala Rao, Secretary of the Karnataka Itihasa Academy refers to the present day Tavarekere suburb.

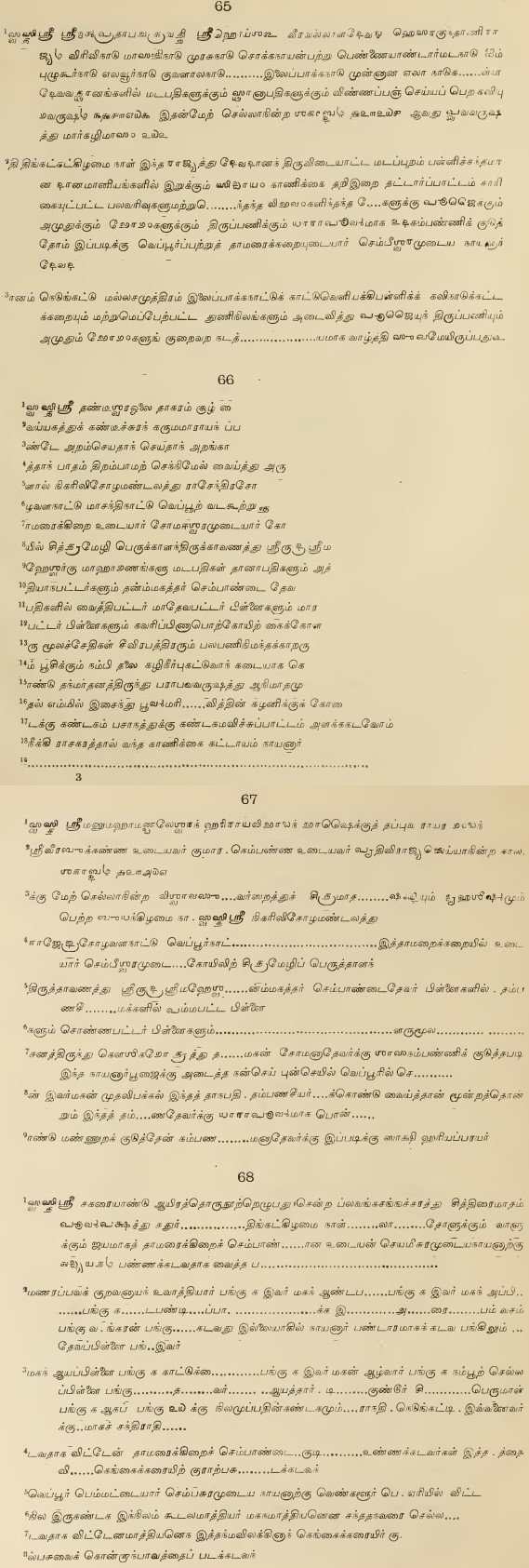
Tamil Inscriptions of the Madiwala Someshwara Temple, Bangalore

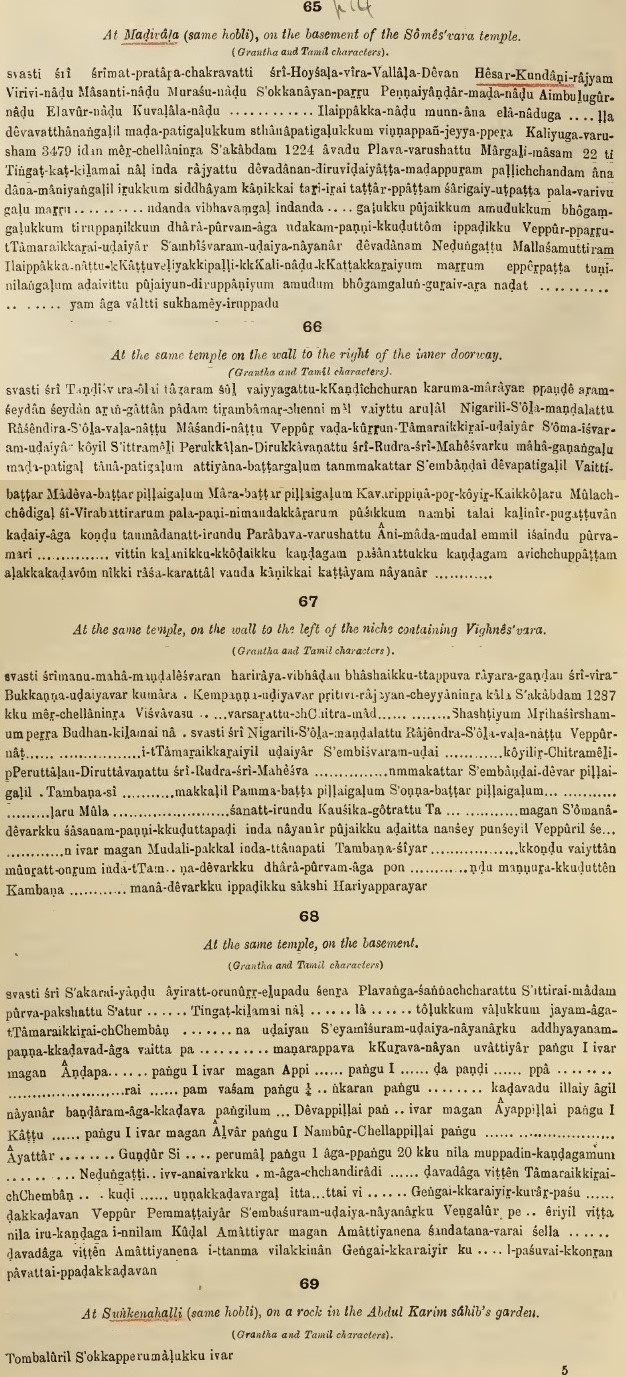
Roman Script of the Tamil Inscriptions of the Madiwala Someshwara Temple, Bangalore

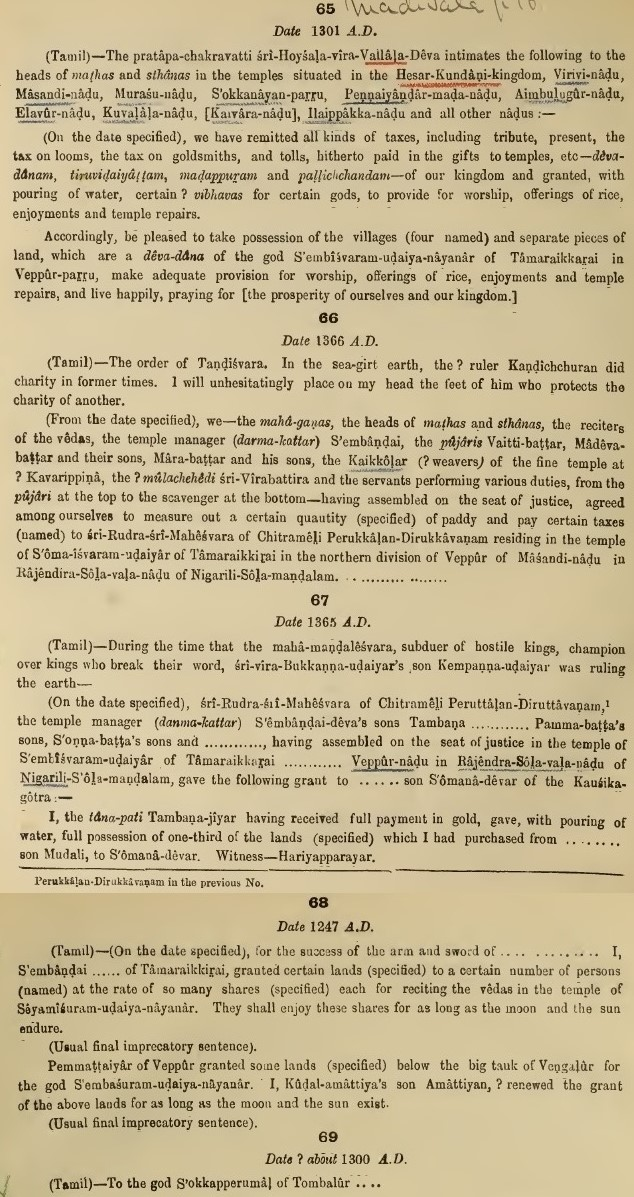
English Translations of the Tamil Inscriptions of the Madiwala Someshwara Temple, Bangalore

=== Around Bangalore ===
==== Dharmeshwara Temple, Kondarahalli, Hoskote ====
Vijayanagar period copper plates in possession of the temple priest written in Grantha script:

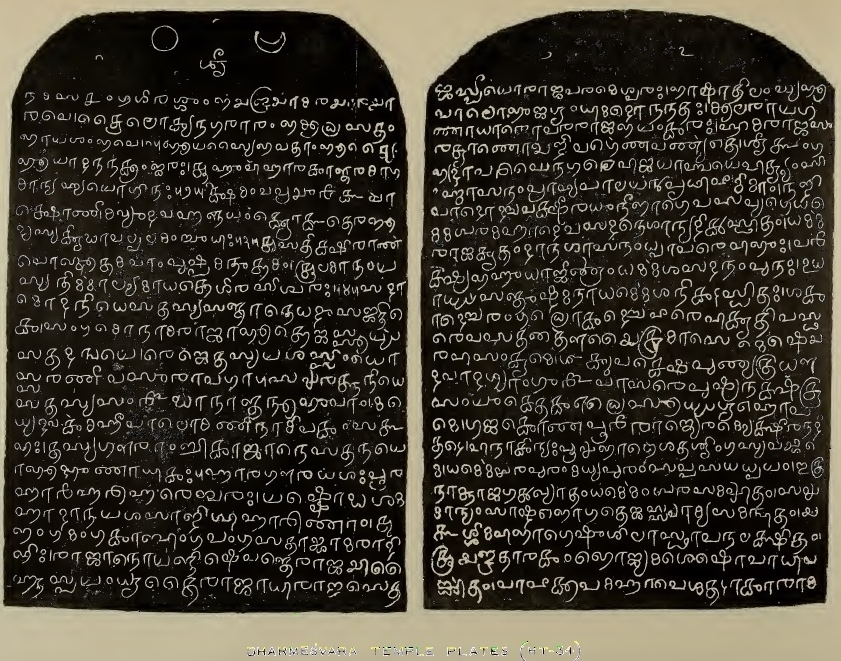
Dharmeshwara Temple Plates - Vijaynagar Period

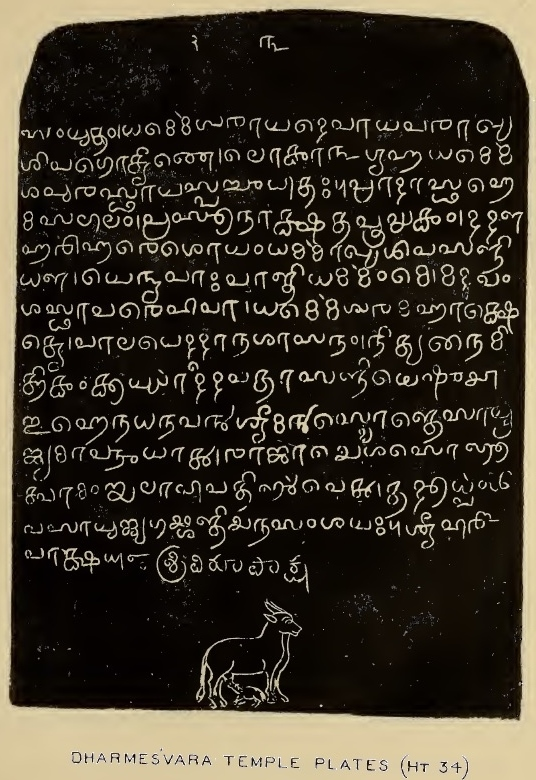
Dharmeshwara Temple Plates - Vijaynagar Period
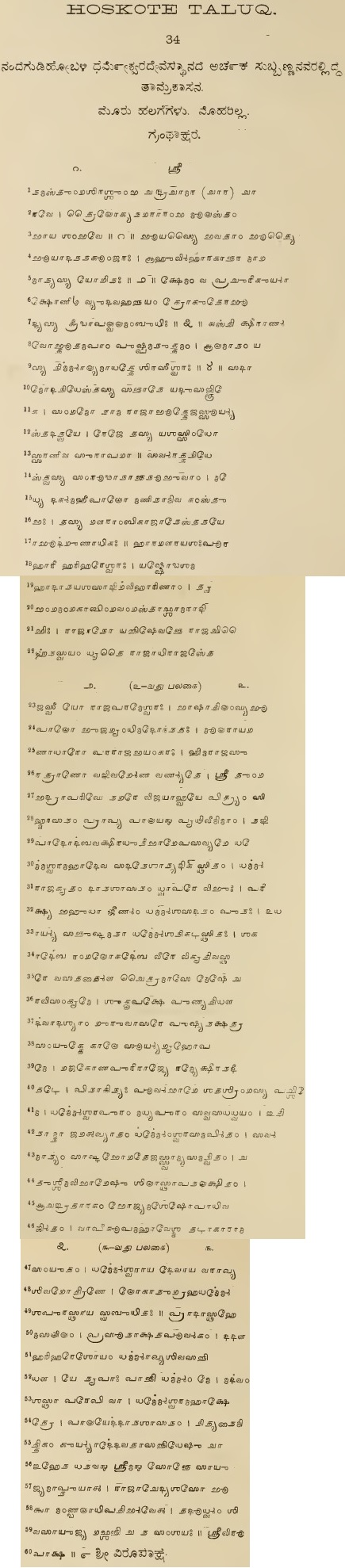
Tamil Inscriptions of the Dharmeshwara Temple, Kondarahalli, Hoskote

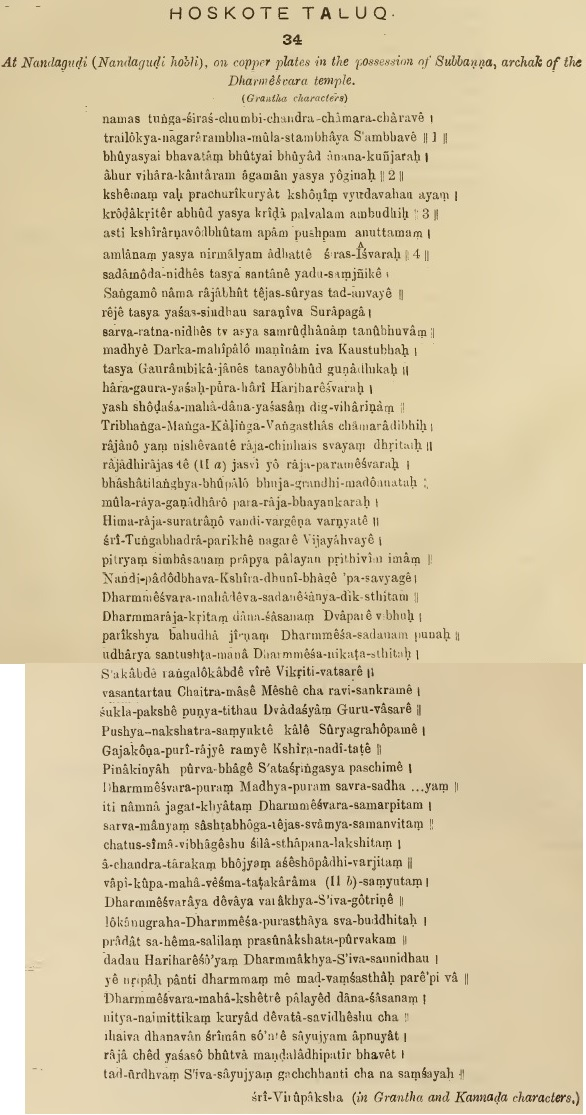
Roman Script of the Tamil Inscriptions of the Dharmeshwara Temple, Kondarahalli, Hoskote

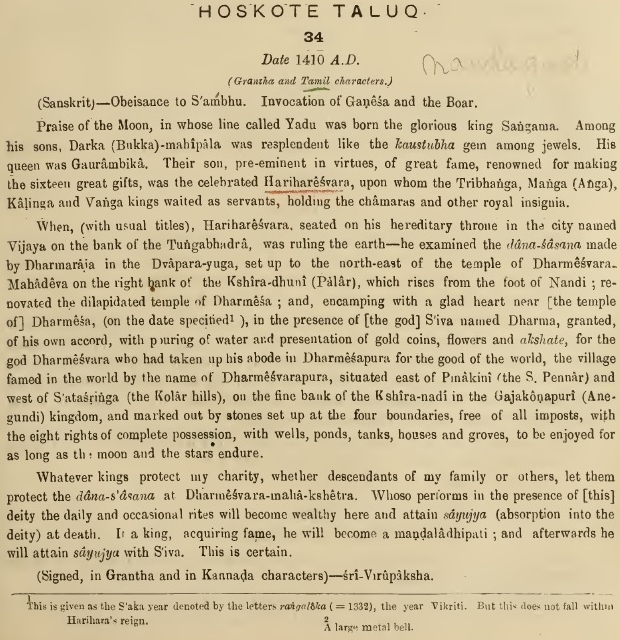
English Translation of the Tamil Inscriptions of the Dharmeshwara Temple, Kondarahalli, Hoskote

==== Bhoga Nandeeshwara Temple, Nandi ====
The Bhoga Nandeeshwara Temple, on Nandi Hills (Nandidurg), 50 km from Bangalore has Chola period Tamil inscriptions on the walls

==== Kolaramma Temple, Kolar ====
The Kolaramma Temple, at Kolar, 60 km from Bangalore, was built by Rajendra Chola I (A.D.1012-1044) and has his statute and Tamil inscriptions (KL110-KL115) on the walls of the temple. Numerous other Tamil inscriptions are found around Kolar and Bowringpet

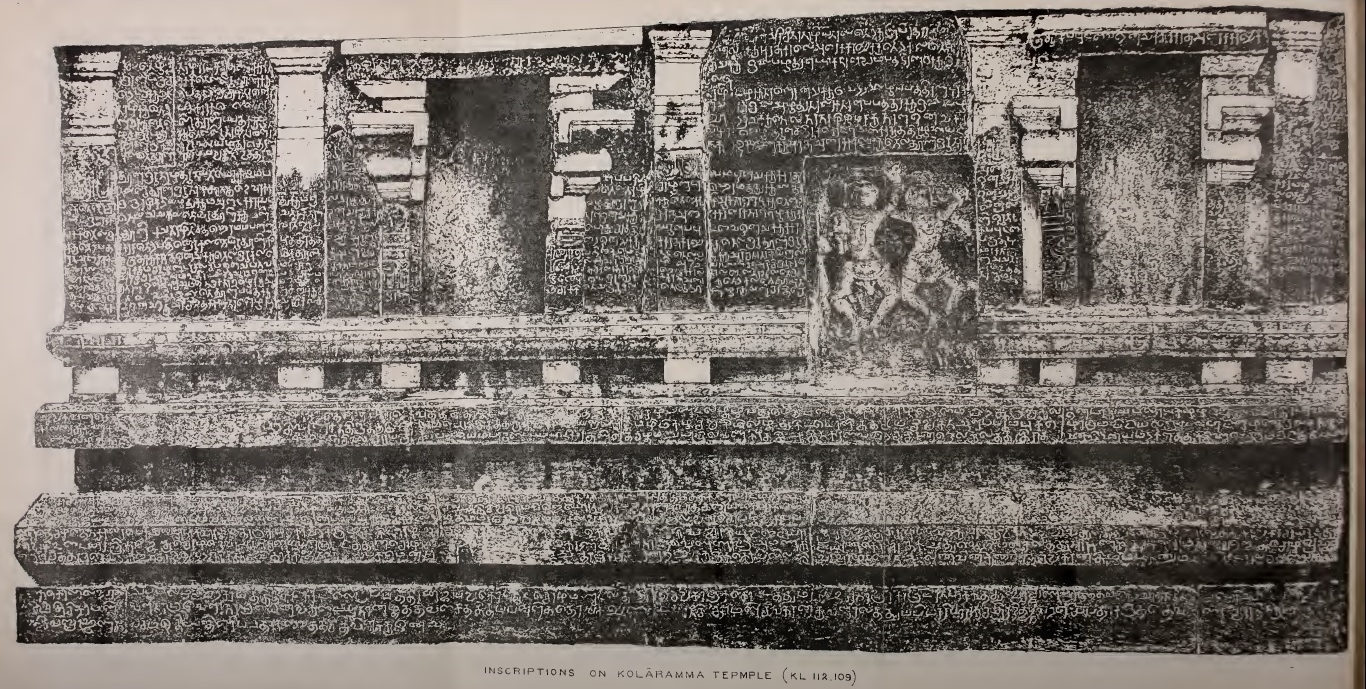
Tamil Inscriptions of the Chola period at the Kolaramma Temple (KL 112 109)

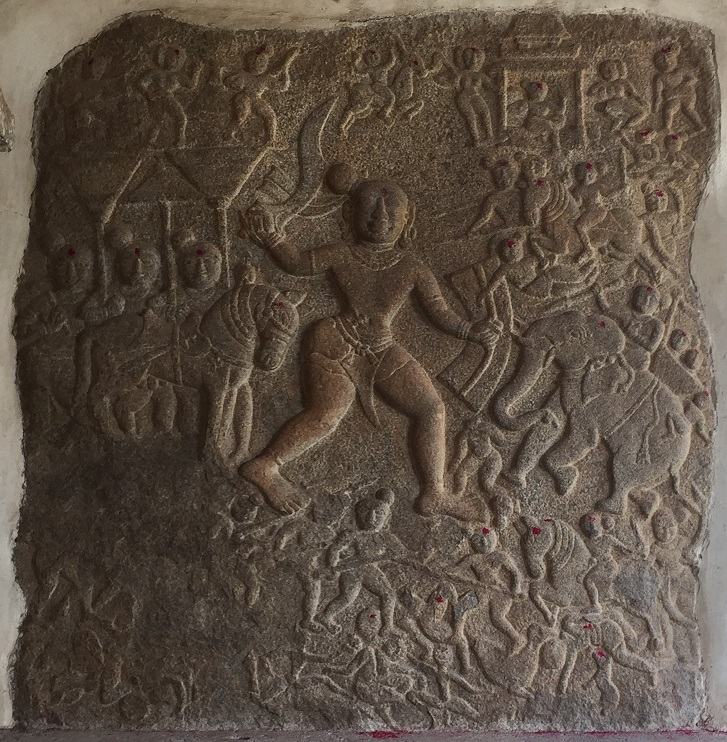
Rajendra Chola I in Battle, Kolaramma Temple

==== Mukthi Natheshwara Temple, Binnamangala ====
The Mukthi Natheshwara Temple, at Binnamangala, Nelamangala Taluk, 60 km from Bangalore was built by period of Kulothunga Chola - 1 (A.D.1069-1120). The inscriptions in Tamil talk about the endowments of surrounding villages to the deity Muththeeswarem Udaiya Mahathevar (Lord Shiva), referring to the place as "Vinmamangalam of Kukkanur Nadu of Viikkiramachola Mandalam"

==== Someshwara Temple, Ulsoor ====
The Someshwara Temple, at Ulsoor was originally built by the Cholas, and later renovated during the Vijaynagar Period.

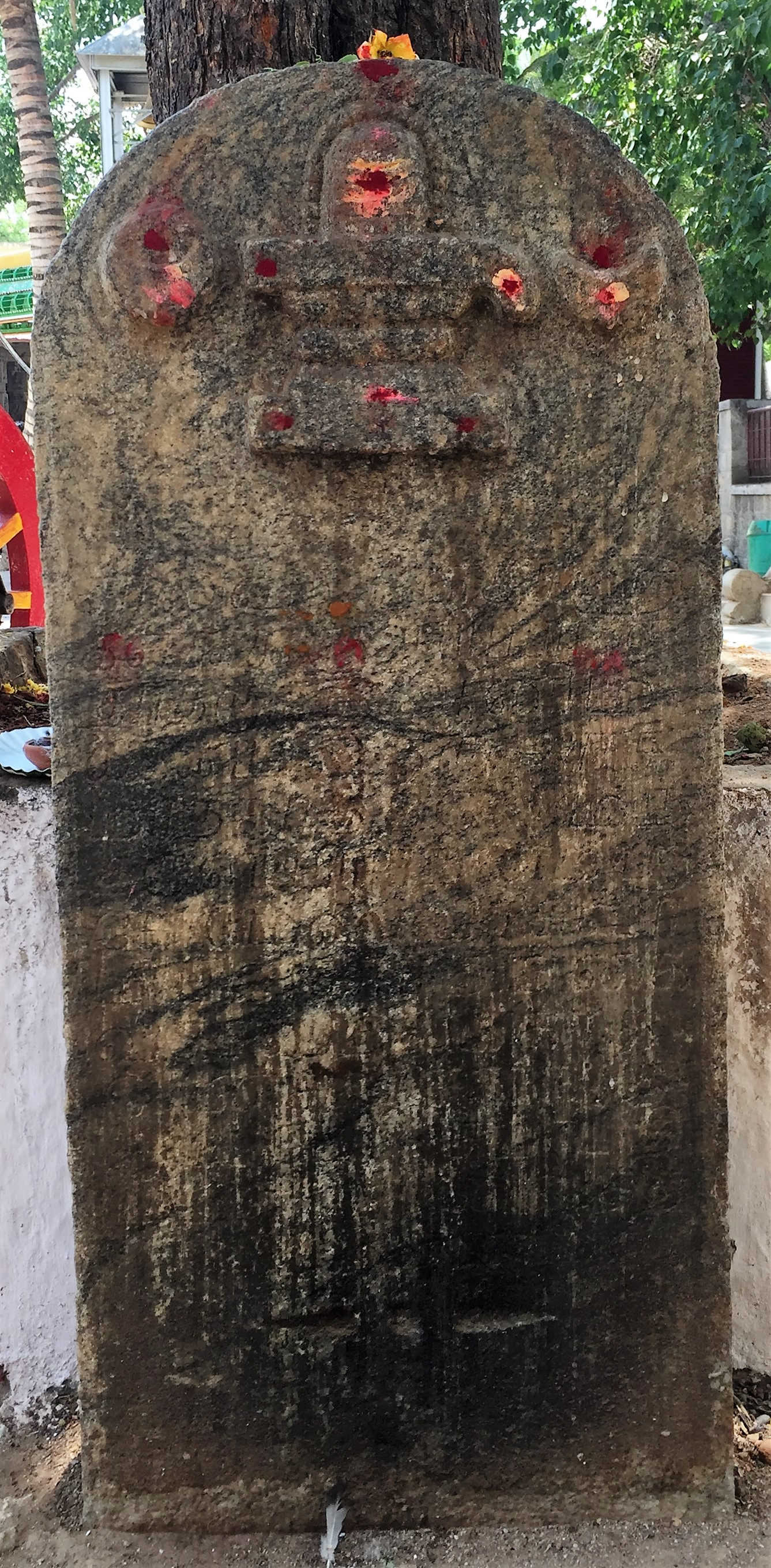
Tamil Inscription, Someshwara Temple, Ulsoor

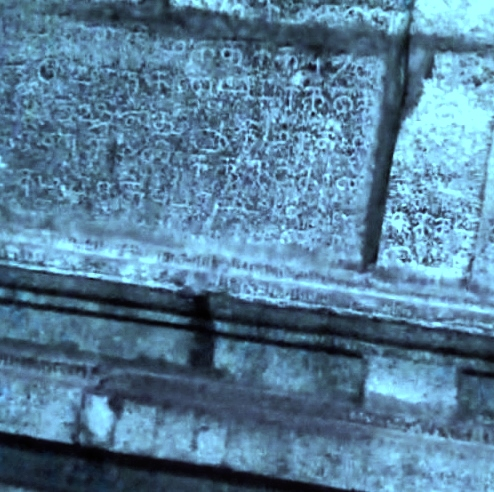
Tamil Inscriptions at the Someshwara Temple, Madivala

Tamil Inscriptions at the Chokkanathaswamy Temple, Domlur

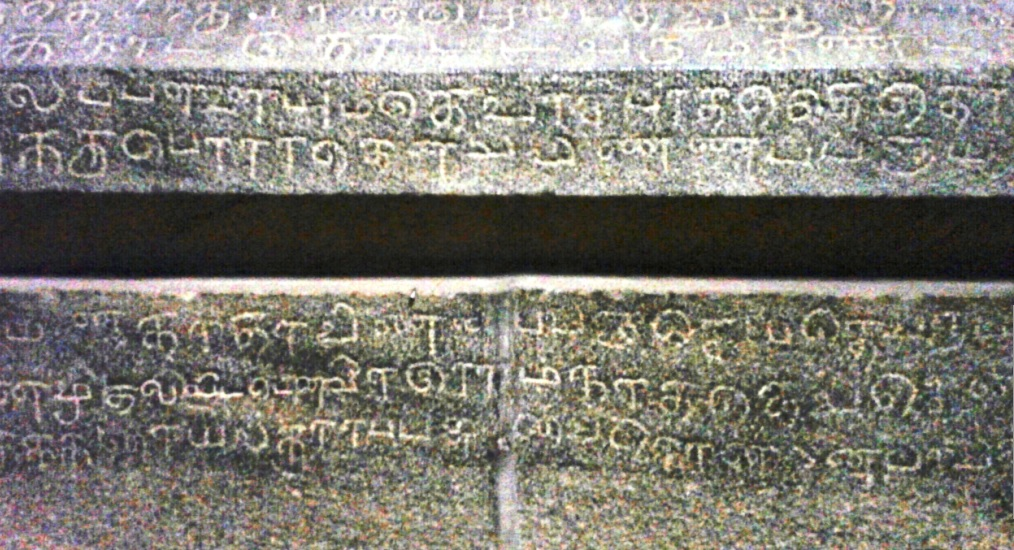
Tamil Inscriptions at the Chokkanathaswamy Temple, Domlur

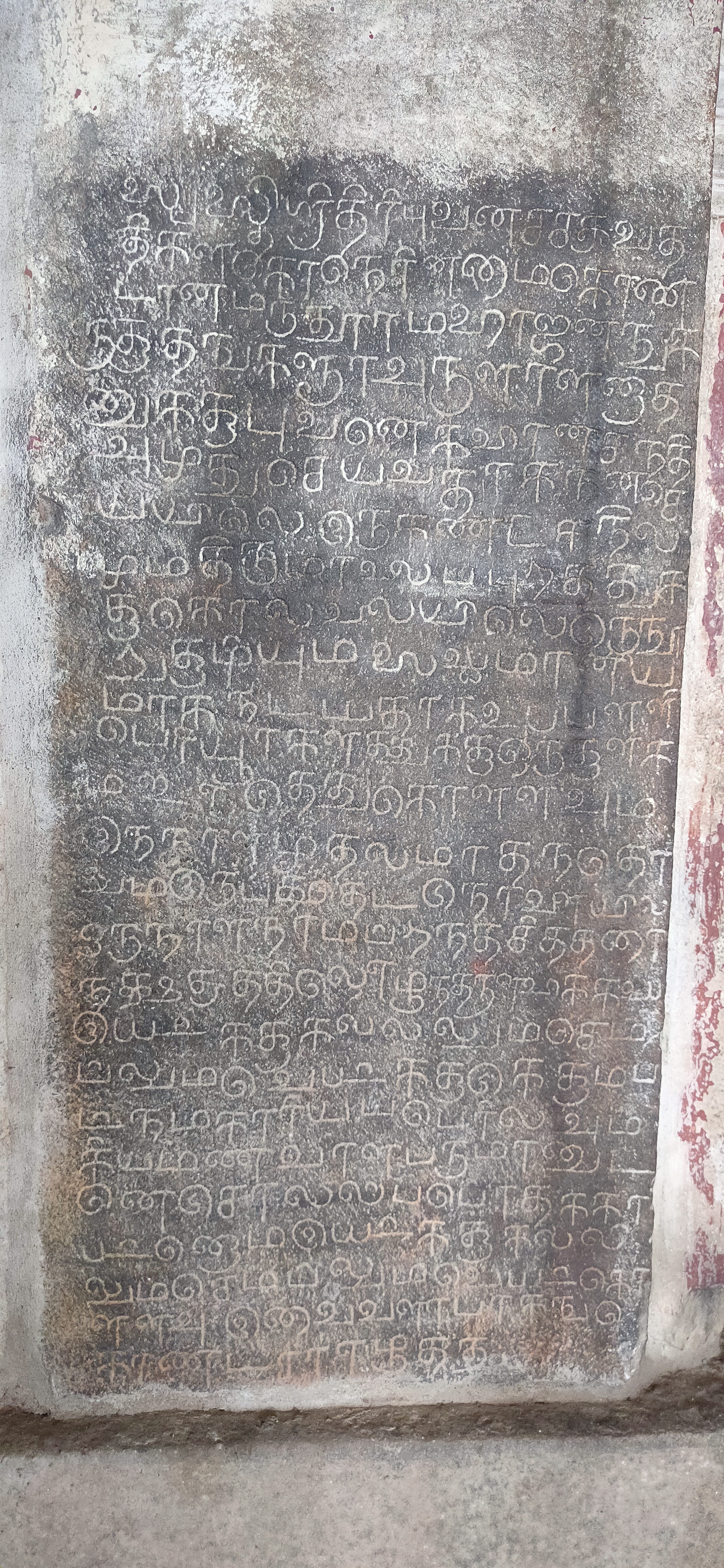
Maddur Ugra Narashima Temple Inscription

=== Maddur ===
An ancient Tamil inscription found in Ugra Narasimha temple in Maddur explains that the temple is built for the people for Marudhur.

== Village Inscriptions ==
=== Kalkere Lake ===
An ancient Tamil inscription, supposed to be from the Chola period was found under a sewage canal connecting to Kalkere Lake in East Bangalore. A similar stone was at Kithaganur Village nearby and has been installed in a temple. The inscription hasn't been deciphered as yet, as it is written in an older form of Tamil.

=== Kaadugodi ===
A Tamil inscription from dating 1043AD exists in Kadugodi, from the period of Rajendra Chola I, which describes the construction of the Pattanduru Lake, and Ganesh, Durga and Kshetrapaala temples by Chola chieftain Raja Raja Velan son of Permadi Gavunda. The Chola period Tamil inscription of Rajendra Chola is located at a graveyard at Kadugodi, East Bangalore. The inscription records the construction of the Pattandur Lake with three sluice gates, with the land grants given by Rajendra Chola. Further, the inscription talks about installation of the deities of Shiva, Durga and Ganapathi. There is some words to protect the inscription, cursing anyone who damages with inheriting the sins of all those who died between The Ganges and the Cape Comorin.

=== Marathahalli ===
Doddanekkundi village, located North of Marathahalli, and much older than Marathahalli, has two ancient inscriptions in Tamil. The first inscription dated 1304, mentions the village name as Nerkundi and talks about the existence of a fort around the village constructed in 1304. The second inscription talks about the Hoysala king Ballala III granting the entire revenue of the Doddanekkundi village to the Shivagange Temple. There is also a Telugu inscription in Marathahalli. According to scholars, this shows the use of Tamil and Telugu in Bangalore, much before the reign of Krishnadevaraya of the Vijaynagar Kingdom.

=== KR Puram ===
In 2017, Tamil inscriptions of the Hoysala period were discovered around Bangalore. Two inscriptions of Ballala II (1173-1220) were found in KR Puram. The inscription was found at Sadaramangala describes land grants made to Brahmins who had migrated from the present Andhra Pradesh region. Another inscription dated 1343 was found an abandoned site in Kattigenahalli near Yelahanka. This inscription has 16 lines and dates to the year after death of the Hoysala King Ballala III.

=== Tamatakallu village, Chitradurga district ===
15th September 2021, The New Indian Express published, The Tamizh(தமிழ்) inscription in 'Vatteluttu Script' (characters of round type), dating back to the 6th century was identified by him and that he had read the letters inscribed on it. The inscription reads as 'Elur Modallar Saatan', which might be the name of the stone inscriber or sculptor who had also carved the hero stone nearby. He further said that the stone inscription in Tamil is the oldest in Karnataka, the last one being a Tenth-century inscription discovered at Kolar earlier. This also proves harmony prevailed during the sixth century between Kannadigas and Tamilians. https://www.newindianexpress.com/states/karnataka/2021/sep/15/karnataka-6th-century-hero-stone-tamil-inscription-restored-in-tamatakallu-2359027.html

== British Period Inscriptions in Tamil ==
=== Madras Sappers War Memorial, Brigade Road ===
A war memorial raised by the British to commemorate the lives lost in different wars by the Madras Sappers Regiment. It details the number of British officers, Indian officers and soldiers who died fighting during Second Opium War in China, Third Anglo-Burmese War(1885–87), World War I, Mesopotamia (modern Iraq) (1916–18), East Africa (1914-18) and the North West Frontier (1915). The soldiers fell during the Indian wars of Assaye, Seringapatam, Seetabuldee and Sholinghur are also acknowledged. The inscriptions are both in English and Tamil.

=== Broadway, Shivajinagar ===
When an encroached storm water drain was cleared in Shivajinagar, a huge plaque dating back to the 19th century was found. The stone, shows the progress of the building of the British Bangalore Cantonment. It reads 'This stone laid across the main channel in 1868 and worn by the feet of two generations was set up to mark the opening of this bridge and road on 16 February 1922'. The inscription is in English, Tamil and Urdu. According to SK Aruni, deputy director of the Indian Council of Historical Research, Tamil was used as all the workers of the British were Tamil people, and Urdu to communicate to the Hindustani men working for the British.

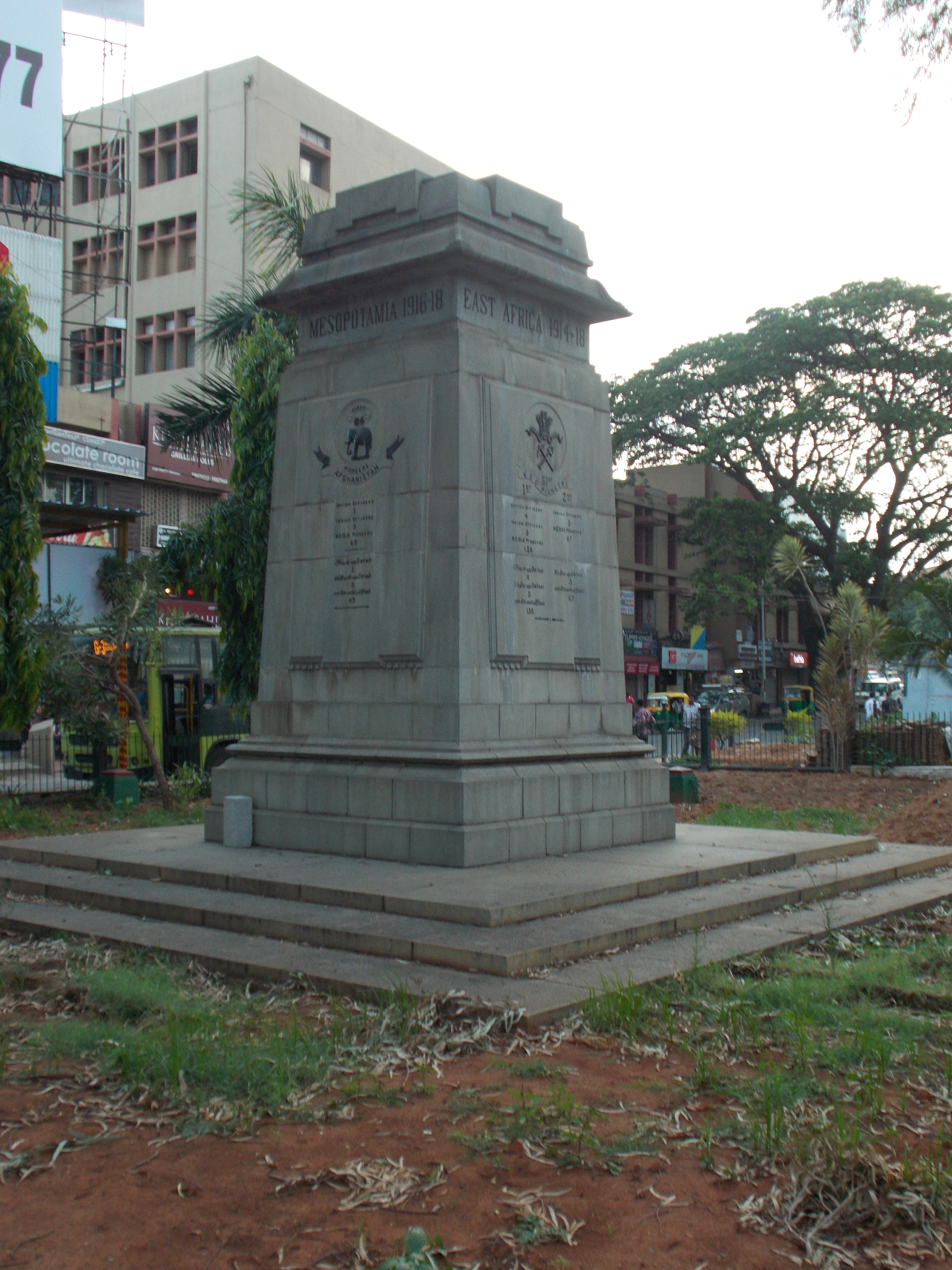
British War Memorial in Bangalore in English & Tamil

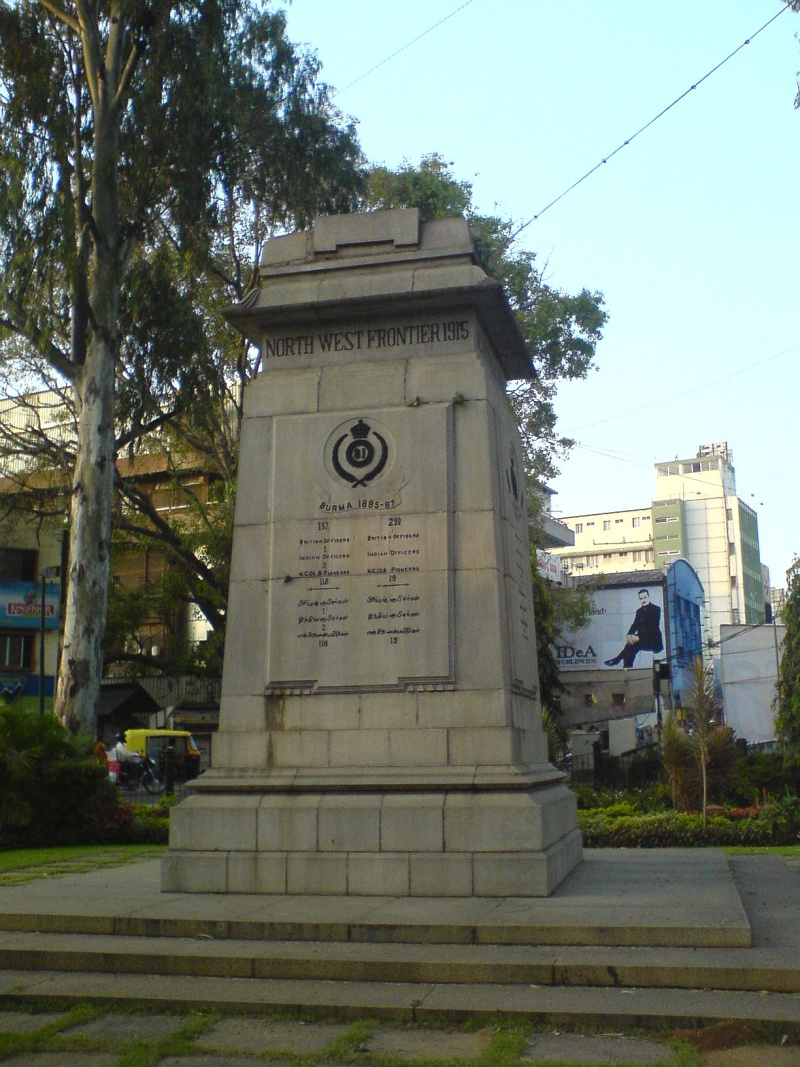
Madras Regiment War Memorial, Bangalore

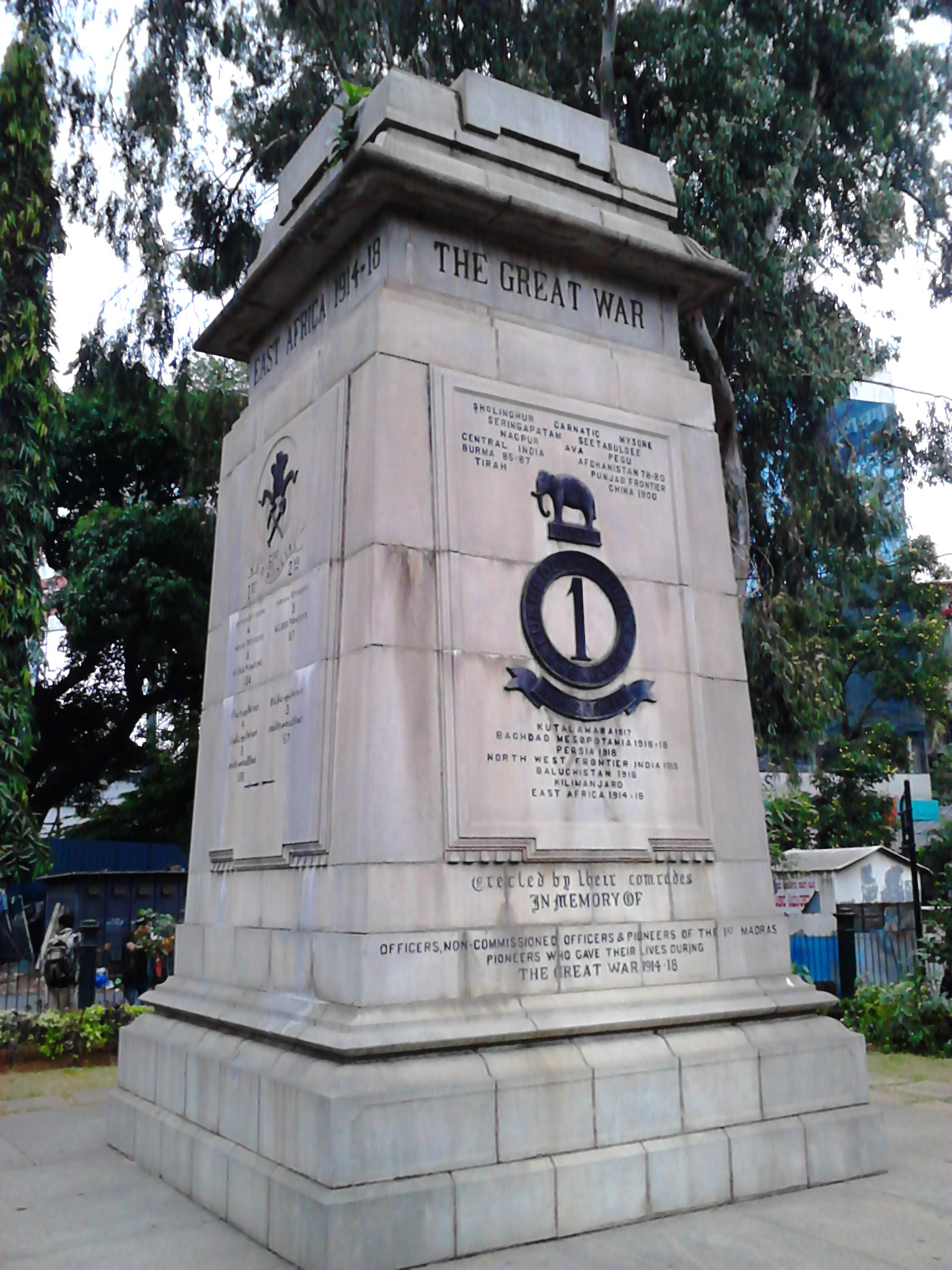
War Memorial on Brigade Road

== See also ==
- Vatteluttu
- Indian inscriptions
- Tamil copper-plate inscriptions
- Tamils in Bangalore
- Bangalore Tamil Dialects
- Gulakamale (Bengaluru) Inscriptions
