= Karnataka Tamils =

Community of Tamil speakers from Karnataka

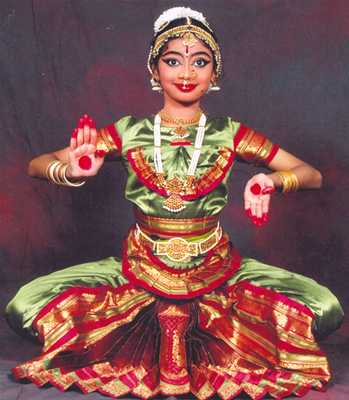
Bharatanatyam is a classical dance form popular amongst the Tamils

The Karnataka Tamils are a social community of Tamil language speakers living in the Indian state of Karnataka. Significant population of Tamils are found in Bengaluru, and the districts of Chamrajnagar, Kolar, Mandya, Mysuru, and other regions of the old Mysore Kingdom. As per the 2011 census, there were 2.1 million Tamils living in Karnataka.

Tamils migrated to Bengaluru in three major waves, the first after the 10th century CE; the second during the Vijayanagara Empire; and the third, in the 18th century, for government jobs during the British Raj. Until 1950, some parts of Karnataka were part of the erstwhile Madras Presidency. According to 1991 census, Tamil speakers formed 21% of the population of Bengaluru.

== History ==
According to Srinivas, at the end of the tenth century, the Cholas from Tamil Nadu began to penetrate in areas east of Bangalore; it later began to extend its control over parts of present-day Bangalore, such as Domlur on the eastern side of the city. Around 1004, during the reign of Rajendra Chola I, the Cholas defeated the Western Gangas, and captured Bangalore. In the 19th century, Bangalore essentially became a twin city, with the "pētē", whose residents were predominantly Kannadigas, and the "cantonment" created by the British, whose residents were predominantly British and Tamils.

== Communities ==
=== Hebbar Iyengar ===
Hebbar Iyengars were formerly an endogamous group and constitute a part of the Iyengar sub-caste of the Karnataka Brahmins. They are traditionally followers of Ramanuja and Vedanta Desika. They hail primarily from Hassan, Mysore, Tumkur, Bangalore, and surrounding areas in southern Karnataka. The characteristic dialect of the Hebbar Iyengars is called Hebbar Tamil and is a mixture of Iyengar Tamil, Kannada and Sanskrit. The group's primary mother tongue is Hebbar Tamil which is spoken in most Hebbar Iyengar households, though Kannada and English are increasingly taking its place. A peculiar characteristic of Iyengar Tamil (including Hebbar Tamil) is its retention of divine or holy food terminology. For example, Iyengar Tamil makes distinctions between potable ([t̪iːrt̪o]) and non-potable water ([d͡ʒʌlo]), the former considered sacred but both borrowed from Sanskrit. Standard Tamil exhibits only the generic term for 'water'. The Vaishnavite Brahmins of Southern Karnataka use the Tamil surname "Iyengar" and are believed to have migrated during the time of the 11th century Vaishnavite saint Ramanujacharya. Most Iyengars in Karnataka use sub-dialects of Iyengar Tamil.

=== Thigala ===
Thigala or Tigala are a Tamil social group found in parts of Karnataka. They are likely a sub-caste of Vanniyars. The Thigalas celebrate an annual festival called Karaga. The story of the Karaga is rooted in the Mahabharata and Draupadi is the community deity of the people. The Karaga festival is generally led by the men of the community. A legend gives them this privilege: Thigalas believe that in the last part of the Mahabharatha, when the Pandavas were shown a glimpse of hell, one last asura called Tripurasura was still alive. At this time, Draupadi, the wife of the Pandavas, took the form of Shakthi. She created a huge army of soldiers called the Veerakumaras. After defeating the asura, the soldiers asked Shakthi to stay back with them. Though she had to go back, she promised them that she would come to stay with them every year during Chitra Pournami, the first full moon of the first month of the Hindu calendar.

== Demographics ==
Tamils form 3.46% of the total population of the state. Almost 5 million Tamils live outside Tamil Nadu, inside India. There has been a recorded presence of Tamil-speaking people in Southern Karnataka since the 10th century.

Suburbs of the Bangalore Cantonment (Fraser Town, Murphy Town, Shivajinagar, Shantala Nagar,Vasanth Nagar, Cooke Town, Langford Town, Benson Town,Ulsoor, Austin Town, Sivanacheti Gardens, Richards Town, Cox Town, Richmond Town, Neelasandra and Viveknagar) have a large Tamil population. They trace their ancestry to the large number of Tamil speaking soldiers, suppliers and workers who were brought into the Bangalore Civil and Military Station, by the British Army, after the fall of Tippu Sultan. The Bangalore Cantonment was directly under the administration of the British Madras Presidency till 1949, when it was handed over to the Mysore State. Significant Tamil-speaking populations are also found in areas of Bangalore not part of the Cantonment such as Devara Jeevanahalli, Lingarajapuram, Banaswadi, Chamarajpet, Kalasipalyam, Wilson Garden, Srirampura, Malleswaram, Vyalikaval, Hebbal, Vidyaranyapura and Yelahanka as well as the eastern and south-eastern localities of Bangalore which are in proximity to the IT Corridor (Whitefield, Electronics City and the Outer Ring Road) such as Baiyyappanahalli, Krishnarajapuram, Indiranagar, Domlur, Koramangala, BTM Layout, HSR Layout, Bannerghatta Road, Madiwala, Bommanahalli, J. P. Nagar and Marathahalli among others. Many of the Tamilians living within or close to the IT corridor of Bangalore are first-generation immigrants who have migrated from Tamil Nadu to work in the IT industry in the city.

== Politics ==
Tamils play an important role in Karnataka's politics there are few legislative constituencies like :-

- Shivajinagar - out of nearly 1.67 lakh voters in the constituency 92,000 are Tamil speaking people about 55% of the constituency. Tamils play a key role in deciding the winning candidate.
- Gandhinagar - out of nearly 1.8 lakh voters in the constituency 90,000 are Tamil speaking people about 50% of the constituency. Tamils play a key role in deciding the winning candidate
- K.G.F(Kolar Gold Field) - Tamil speaking people are about 80% of the constituency.Tamils play a key role in deciding the winning candidate.
- Pulikeshinagar - Tamil speaking people are about 50% of the constituency. Tamils play a key role in deciding the winning candidate.

Tamils even play an important role in Karnataka's parliamentary politics there are few Lok Sabha constituencies like :-

- Bangalore Central Lok Sabha constituency - out of nearly 14 lakh voters in the constituency 5.5 lakh are Tamil speaking people about 39% of the constituency. Tamils play a key role in deciding the winning candidate.
- Kolar Lok Sabha constituency - Tamils play a key role in deciding the winning candidate.

== Tamil inscriptions ==
=== Temple inscriptions ===
==== Chokkanathaswamy Temple, Domlur ====
Chola Tamil inscriptions at the Chokkanathaswamy Temple, Domlur

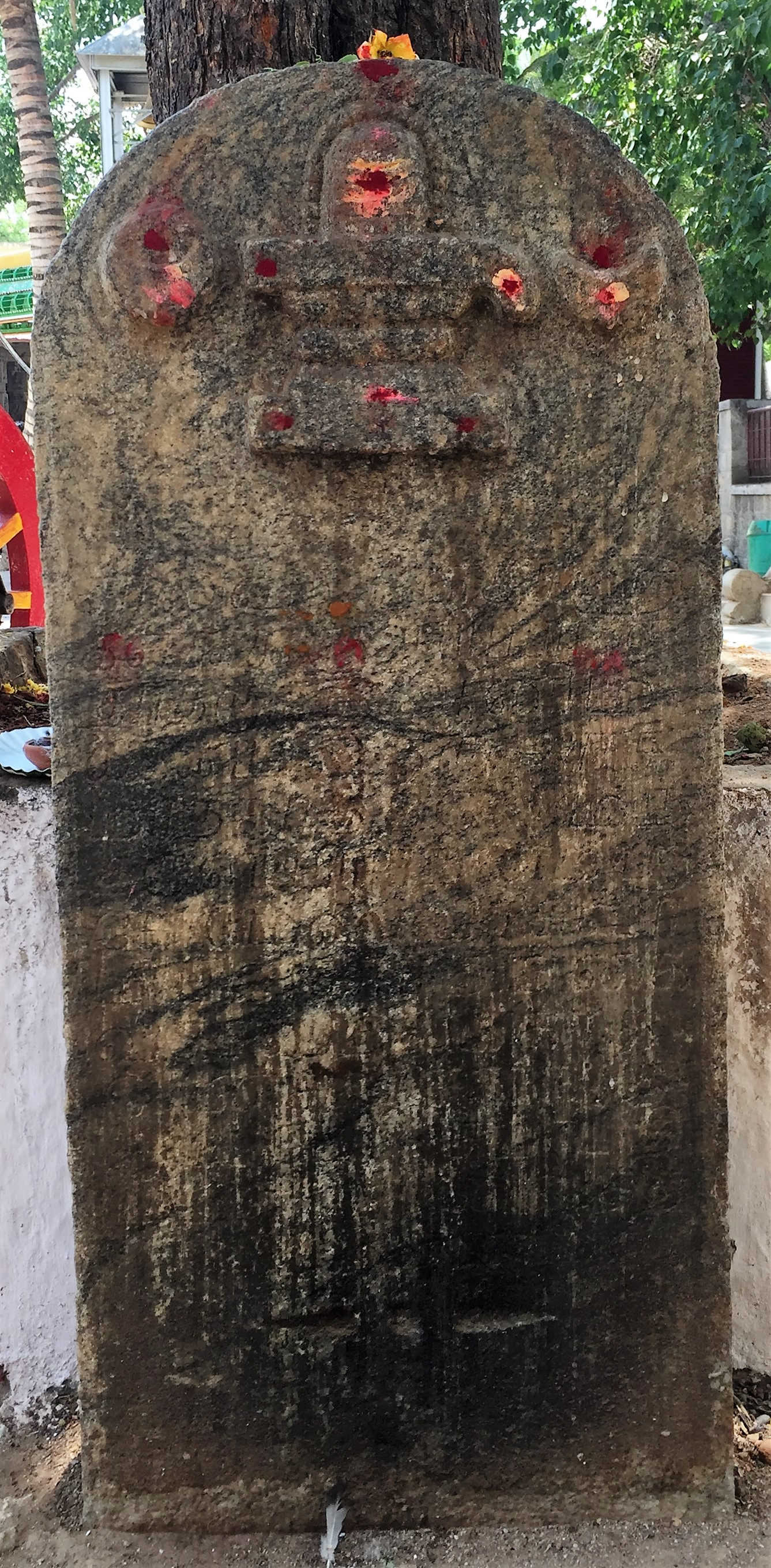
Vijaynagar Tamil inscription, Someshwara Temple, Ulsoor

The Chokkanathaswamy Temple is a 10th-century Chola temple, located in Domlur. There are a number of Tamil inscriptions in the temple. Domlur is called as Tombalur or Desimanikkapattanam in these inscriptions. Chakravarthi Posalaviraramanatha Deva has left inscriptions with directions to temple authorities of his kingdom. Further some inscriptions record the tributes, taxes and tolls made to the temple by Devaraya II of Vijayanagar Empire, which state the houses, wells, land around Tombalur were offered to the deity Sokkapperumal. Another Tamil inscription dated 1270 talks about 2 door posts being donated by Alagiyar. Yet another inscription in Tamil details Talaikkattu and his wife donating lands from Jalapalli village and Vinnamangalam tank to the deity. A 1290AD inscription talks about donation of ten pens from the revenue of Tommalur by Poysala vira Ramananda.

==== Someshwara Temple, Begur ====
The Someshware temple at Madivala is one of Bangalore's oldest, dating back to the Chola period. There are a number of Tamil and Grantha inscriptions on the outer walls of the temple. The oldest of these inscriptions dates to 1247 AD talks about a land grants "below the big tank of Vengalur" by a Veppur (modern Begur) resident. Other inscriptions also talk about other land grants including those done during the reigns of Ballala III and Rajendra Chola. Another instrciption dated 1365 talks about land grand at Tamaraikkirai (which translates to 'lotus pond bank' in Tamil, and according to HS Gopala Rao, Secretary of the Karnataka Itihasa Academy refers to the present day Tavarekere suburb.

=== Village inscriptions ===
==== Kadugodi ====
A Tamil inscription from dating 1043AD exists in Kadugodi, from the period of Rajendra Chola I, which describes the construction of the Pattanduru Lake, and Ganesh, Durga and Kshetrapaala temples by Chola chieftain Raja Raja Velan son of Permadi Gavunda.

==== Marathahalli ====
Doddanekkundi village, located north of Marathahalli, and much older than Marathahalli, has two ancient inscriptions in Tamil. The first inscription dated 1304, mentions the village name as Nerkundi and talks about the existence of a fort around the village constructed in 1304. The second inscription talks about the Hoysala king Ballala III granting the entire revenue of the Doddanekkundi village to the Shivagange Temple. There is also a Telugu inscription in Marathahalli. According to scholars, this shows the use of Tamil and Telugu in Bangalore, much before the reign of Krishnadevaraya of the Vijaynagar Kingdom.

=== British Period inscriptions in Tamil ===
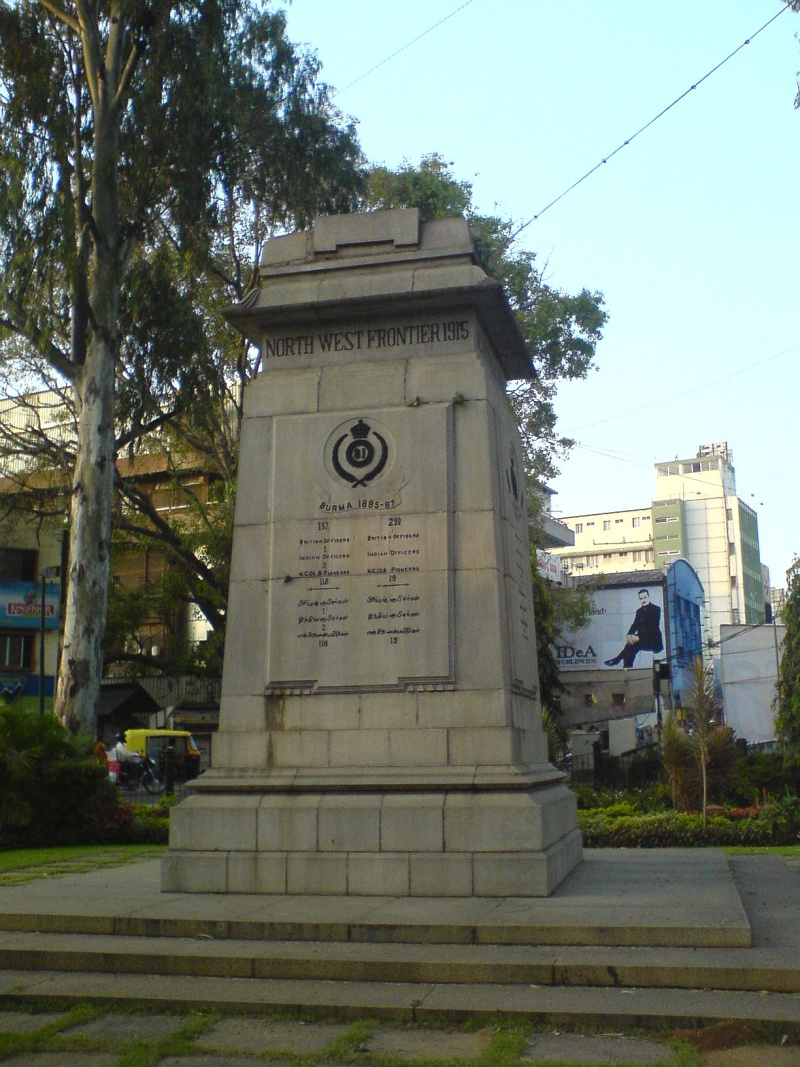
Madras Regiment War Memorial, Bangalore

==== Madras Sappers War Memorial, Brigade Road ====
A war memorial raised by the British to commemorate the lives lost in different wars by the Madras Sappers Regiment. It details the number of British officers, Indian officers and soldiers who died fighting during Second Opium War in China, Third Anglo-Burmese War(1885–87), World War I, Mesopotamia (modern Iraq) (1916–18), East Africa (1914-18) and the North West Frontier (1915). The soldiers fell during the Indian wars of Assaye, Seringapatam, Seetabuldee and Sholinghur are also acknowledged. The inscriptions are both in English and Tamil.

==== Broadway, Shivajinagar ====
When an encroached storm water drain was cleared in Shivajinagar, a huge plaque dating back to the 19th century was found. The stone, shows the progress of the building of the British Bangalore Cantonment. It reads 'This stone laid across the main channel in 1868 and worn by the feet of two generations was set up to mark the opening of this bridge and road on 16 February 1922'. The inscription is in English, Tamil and Urdu. According to SK Aruni, deputy director of the Indian Council of Historical Research, Tamil was used as all the workers of the British were Tamil people, and Urdu to communicate to the Hindustani men working for the British.

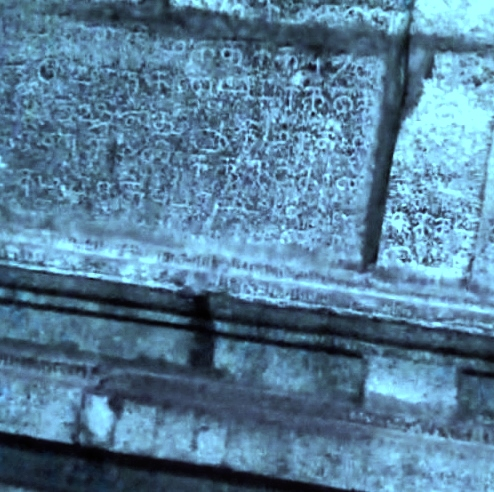
Tamil inscriptions at the Someshwara Temple, Madivala

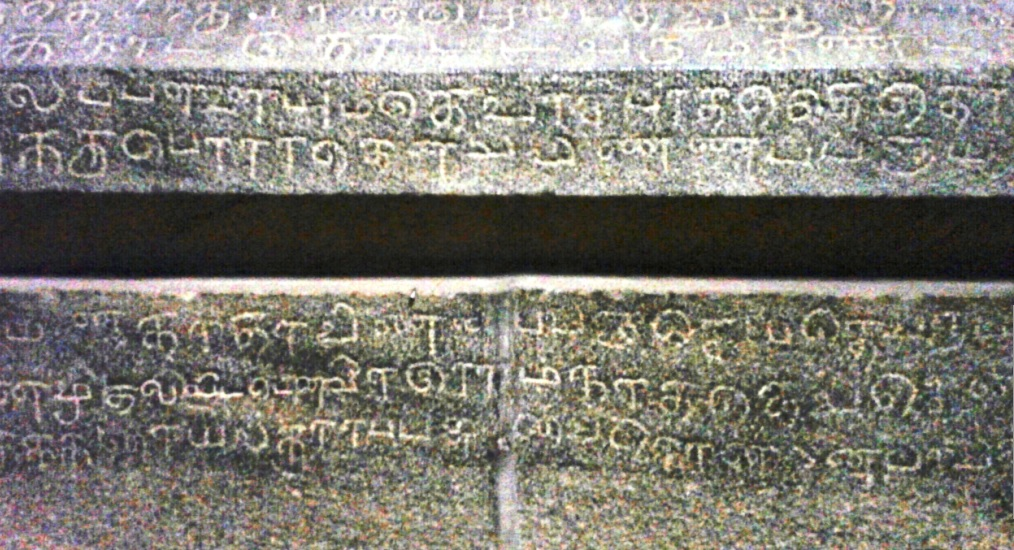
Tamil inscriptions at the Chokkanathaswamy Temple, Domlur

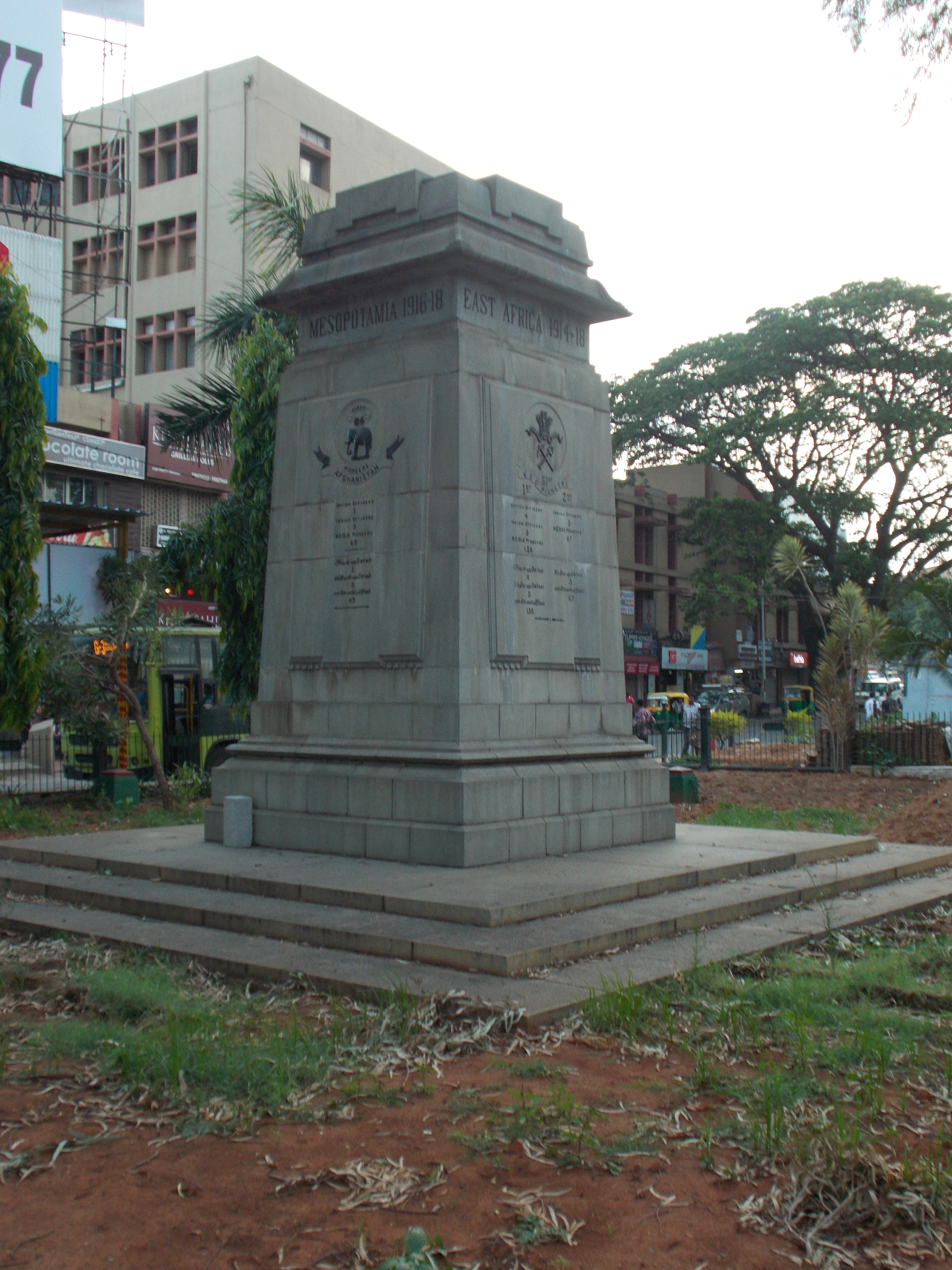
British War Memorial in Bangalore in English & Tamil

== Notable people ==
- Arjun Janya, music composer
- B. M. Sundaravadanan, doctor
- J. Jayalalithaa, politician
- K. Seshadri Iyer, bureaucrat
- Masti Venkatesha Iyengar, poet
- N. Veeraswamy, film producer
- Priyanka Arul Mohan, film actor
- R. Ajay Gnanamuthu, film director
- R. Sarathkumar, film actor
- Ramesh Aravind, film actor
- Ravichandran, film actor
- Sadhu Kokila, film actor
- Varun Chakravarthy, cricketer
- Naveen Chandra, film actor
