= Vasantha Vallabharaya Temple =

Religion
- Affiliation: Hinduism
- District: Bengaluru Urban
- Deity: Lord Vishnu

Location
- Location: Vasantapura
- State: Karnataka
- Country: India
- Interactive map of Vasantha Vallabharaya Temple
- Coordinates: 12°53′44″N 77°33′07″E

Vasantha Vallabharaya Temple, located in Vasantapura in Bangalore, Karnataka, India, is a temple dedicated to the deity Vasantha Vallabharaya, the Hindu god Vishnu. It dates back to the Chola dynasty.

== Overview ==
Situated on a hillock south of Bangalore city in Vasantapura, the Vasantha Vallabharaya Temple, as history records it, belongs to the times of Rishi Mandavya, who, according to sthalapurana, is said to have built the shrine.

According to sthalapurana, Bangalore in the ancient times was called Kalyanpuri and the small town Vasantapura, where, the Vasantha Vallabharaya shrine "devoted to Vishnu" is located, was a site in the midst of a jungle where holy sages meditated. With the passage of time, the greenery was gradually replaced by tilled land. It is said many tirthas (springs) lay on the dirt track that went to the temple site. Those tirthas were considered holy as Lord Vallabharaya, "another incarnation of Vishnu", bathed in them after his marriage to Goddess Lakshmi at Narayana Vana, close to Tirupathi. Today, the road to the temple is paved and only two springs called the Devatirtha and Vasantatirtha remain. Sadly, two of those tirthas were filled with soil for real estate work. It is also apparent that the temple area has suffered owing to the steady growth in the civic works.

Considered to be erected during the Chola dynasty, the ancient temple history also carries the story of Rishi Mandavya's finding of a Svayambhu image of Vallabharaya at the site where the shrine presently sits.

== See also ==
- List of Chola Temples in Bangalore
- Kumaraswamy Layout
