= Kaalikaamba Kamatheshwara Temple =

Religion
- Affiliation: Hinduism
- District: Bangalore
- Deity: Lord Shiva

Location
- Location: Nagarathpet
- State: Karnataka
- Country: India
- Interactive map of Kaalikaamba Kamatheshwara Temple
- Coordinates: 12°58′02″N 77°34′45″E

Architecture
- Completed: More than 800 years old

Kaalikaamba Kamatheshwara Temple is located in Nagarathpet in Bangalore city, Karnataka, India. The city is dedicated to the deities Kaalikaamba and Kamatheshwara (the Hindu god Shiva, and goddess Shakthi or parvathi). The temple is nearly 800 years old and dates back to the Chola period.
