= Sri Madduramma Temple =

Religion
- Affiliation: Hinduism
- District: Bangalore
- Deity: Lord Madduramma

Location
- Location: Huskur (Anekal Taluk)
- State: Karnataka
- Country: India
- Interactive map of Sri Madduramma Temple
- Coordinates: 12°51′40″N 77°42′19″E

Sri Madduramma Temple, located in Huskur (Anekal Taluk) in the city of Bangalore, Karnataka, India, is a temple dedicated to the Hindu deity Madduramma. It is one of the oldest temples dating back to the Chola period. Every year the Grand festival is celebrated during March or April month.
