= Dharmesvara Temple =

Religion
- Affiliation: Hinduism
- District: Bangalore
- Deity: Lord (Shiva)

Location
- Location: Kondrahalli
- State: Karnataka
- Country: India
- Interactive map of Dharmesvara Temple
- Coordinates: 13°10′52″N 77°55′27″E

Architecture
- Completed: 1065 AD

Dharmesvara Temple, located in Kondrahalli, Bangalore Rural, Hoskote Taluk in Bangalore, Karnataka, India, is dedicated to the deity Dharmesvara (the Hindu god Shiva). It dates back to the Chola period of 1065 AD. The temple also has 5000 years of history as informed by the temple in charge, Mr. Manjunath.

Yaksha kandam of Mahabharata is believed to have taken place on this site. The temple has a pond wherein, as per the Mahabharata epic, the four Pandava princes die while fetching water. According to the legend, Dharmaraja challenges the Yaksha and answers the 248 questions, of which he gets the boon from lord Yama in return to bring his four brothers back to life.
