= Mukthi Natheshwara Temple =

Religion
- Affiliation: Hinduism
- District: Bengaluru North district
- Deity: Lord Mukthi Natheshwara

Location
- Location: Nelamangala
- State: Karnataka
- Country: India
- Interactive map of Mukthi Natheshwara Temple

Mukthi Natheshwara Temple located in Binnamangala, Nelamangala, Karnataka, India, is dedicated to the deity Mukthi Natheshwara (the Hindu god Shiva). It dates back to the Rajaraja Chola period. (1110 A.D)
