= Old Madiwala Someshwara Temple, Bengaluru =

Old Madiwala Someshwara Temple, Bangalore

Religion
- Affiliation: Hinduism
- District: Bangalore
- Deity: Lord Someshwara

Location
- Location: Bangalore
- State: Karnataka
- Country: India
- Interactive map of Old Madiwala Someshwara Temple, Bangalore
- Coordinates: 12.9180°N 77.6185°E

Architecture
- Completed: 1247

Old Madiwala Sri Someshwara Temple located in Bangalore city (also Bengaluru), Karnataka, India is dedicated to the deity Someshwara (the Hindu god Shiva). It is one among the oldest temples in the city and dates back to the Chola Empire period. The temple belongs to the early 12th century.(1247 AD).

The temple houses a "Swayambu" Shiva lingam in it Sanctum Sanctorum (Shiva lingam formed by natural Rock Formation). But unlike other ancient temples in Bangalore, this temple is in good shape and cared well by people around.

== Inscriptions in Tamil ==
The Someshware temple at Madivala is one of Bangalore's oldest, dating back to the Chola period. There are a number of Tamil and Grantha inscriptions on the outer walls of the temple. The oldest of these inscriptions dates to 1247 AD talks about a land grants "below the big tank of Vengalur" by a Veppur (modern Begur) resident. Other inscriptions also talk about other land grants including those done during the reigns of Ballala III and Rajendra Chola. Another instrciption dated 1365 talks about land grand at Tamaraikkirai (which translates to 'lotus pond bank' in Tamil, and according to HS Gopala Rao, Secretary of the Karnataka Itihasa Academy refers to the present day Tavarekere suburb.

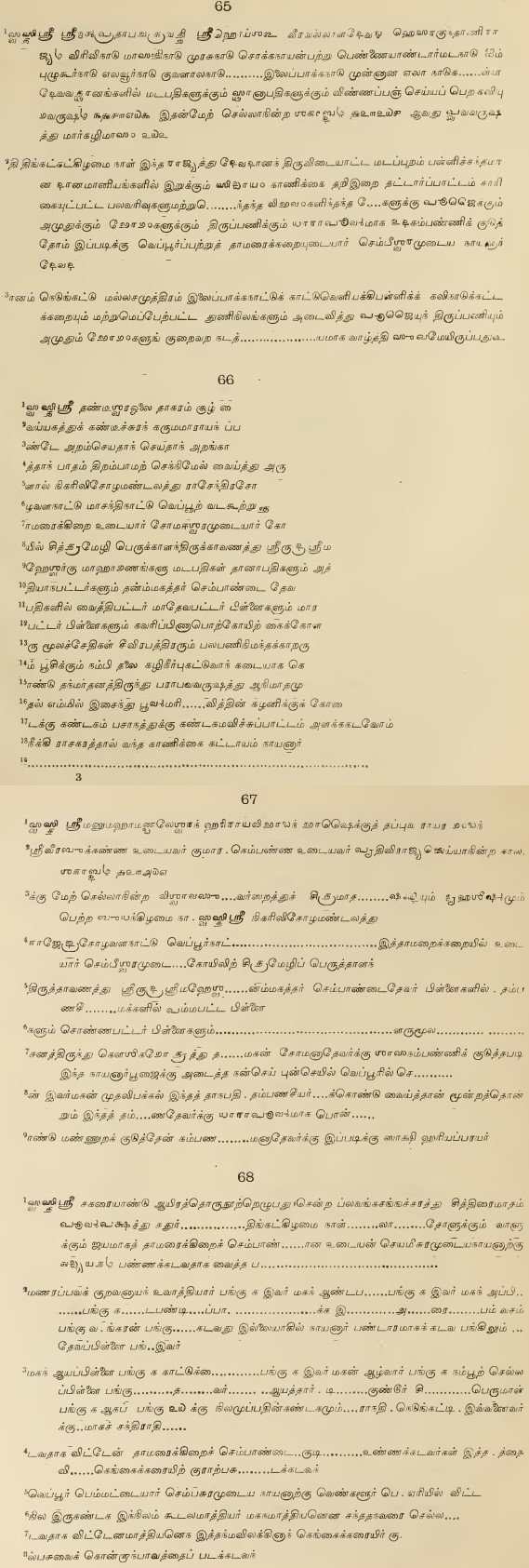
Tamil Inscriptions of the Madiwala Someshwara Temple, Bangalore

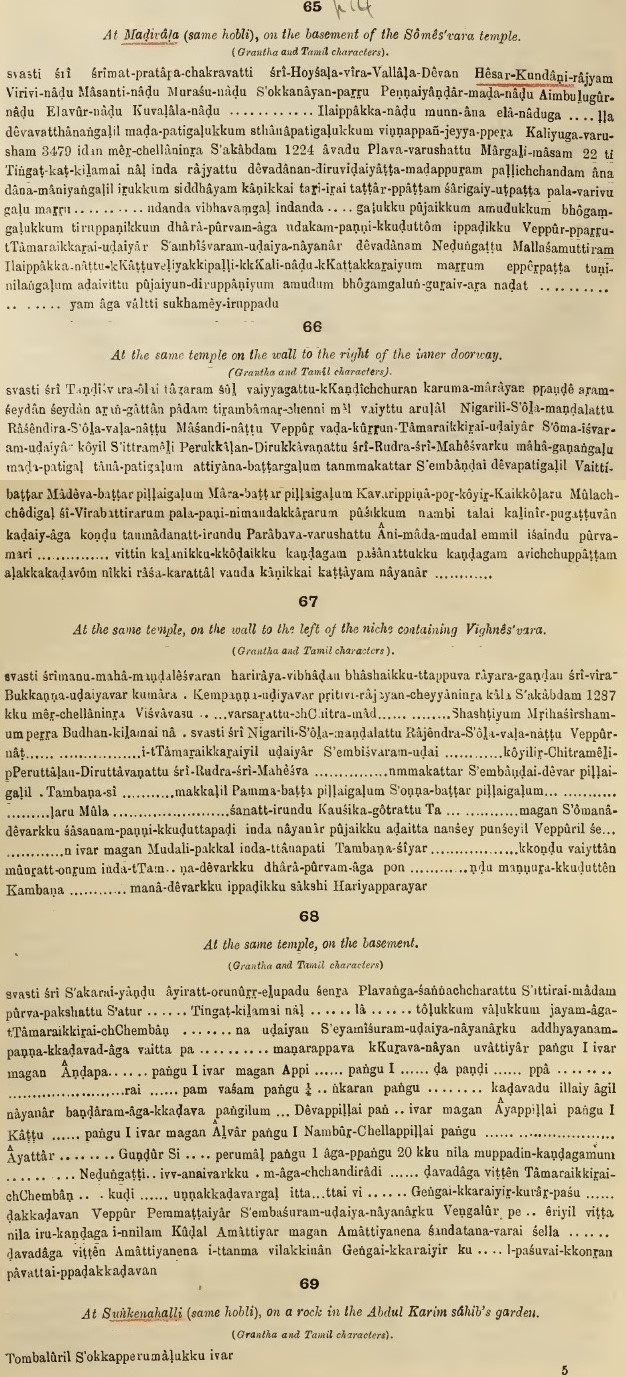
Roman Script of the Tamil Inscriptions of the Madiwala Someshwara Temple, Bangalore

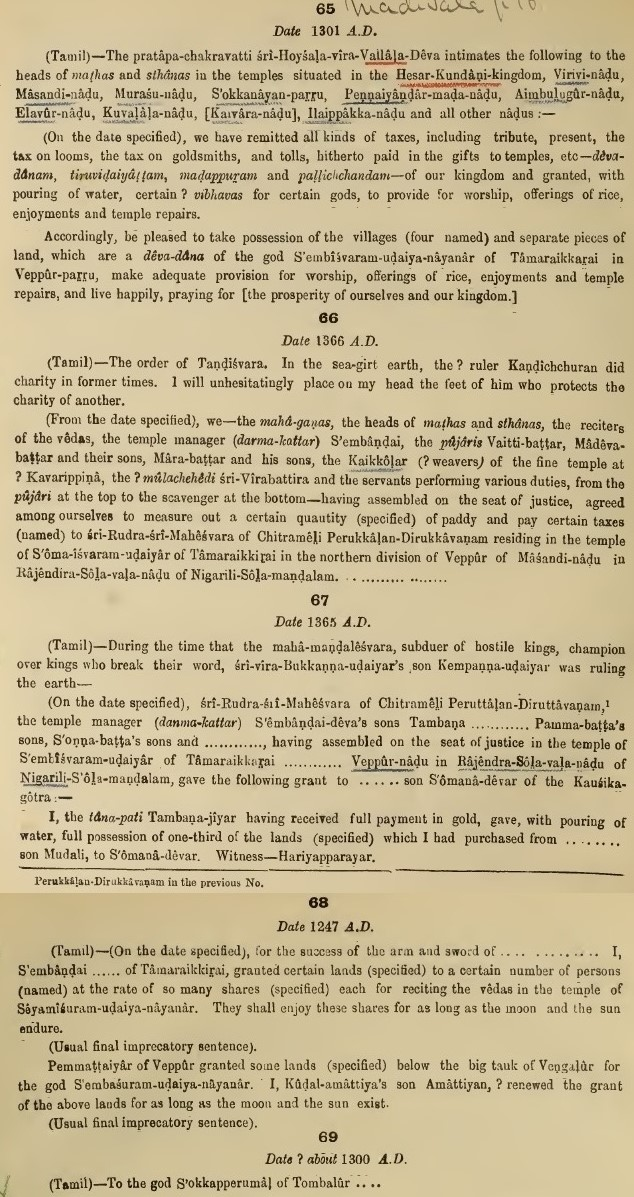
English Translations of the Tamil Inscriptions of the Madiwala Someshwara Temple, Bangalore

== Vengalur (present day 'Veppur' (Begur)) ==
Begur is referred Veppur in the inscription. Some of the Tamil words starting with a 'va' are pronounced in Kannada as 'ba'

== Tamaraikkirai (present day Taverekere) ==
From inscriptions(1365 AD), it is known that Taverekere was once called Tamaraikkirai.Tamaraikkirai meaning 'the banks of the lotus pond' in Tamil language

== Special days ==
Maha Shivratri : Celebrated every year on Month of February in the Krishna Paksha (waning moon) of the month of Maagha (as per Shalivahana) or Phalguna (as per Vikrama) in the Hindu Calendar (that is, the night before and day of the new moon).

Pradosham : Occurs once in every 15 days and considered most auspicious by Shaivites, it occurs almost 2 days before either Amavasya (black moonday) or Pournima (full moon day).

== Gallery ==
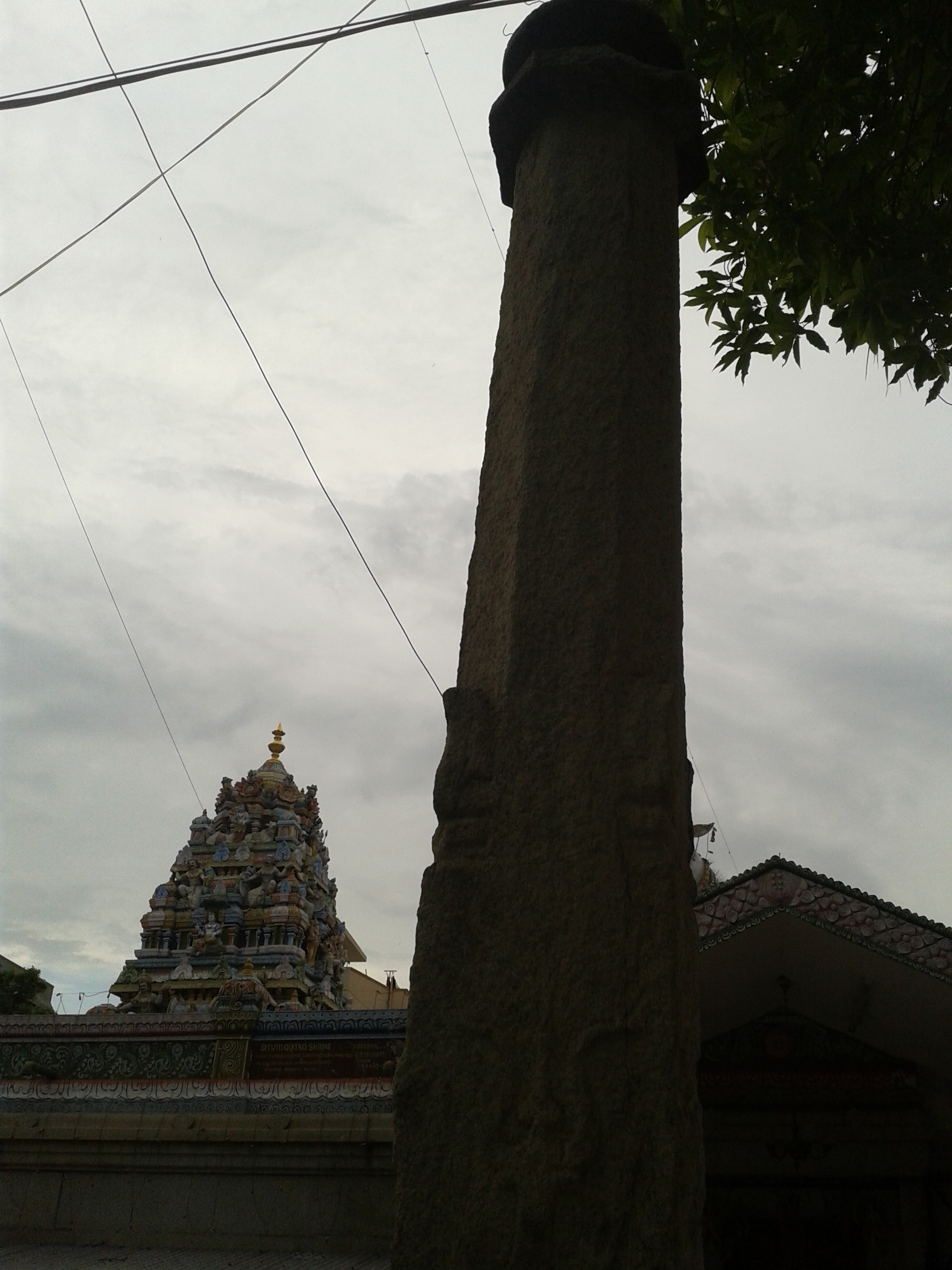
Someswara Temple,Old Madiwala,Bangalore. The temple is said to be a Chola period structure, making it one among Bangalore's oldest. The earliest record dates to 1247 AD.

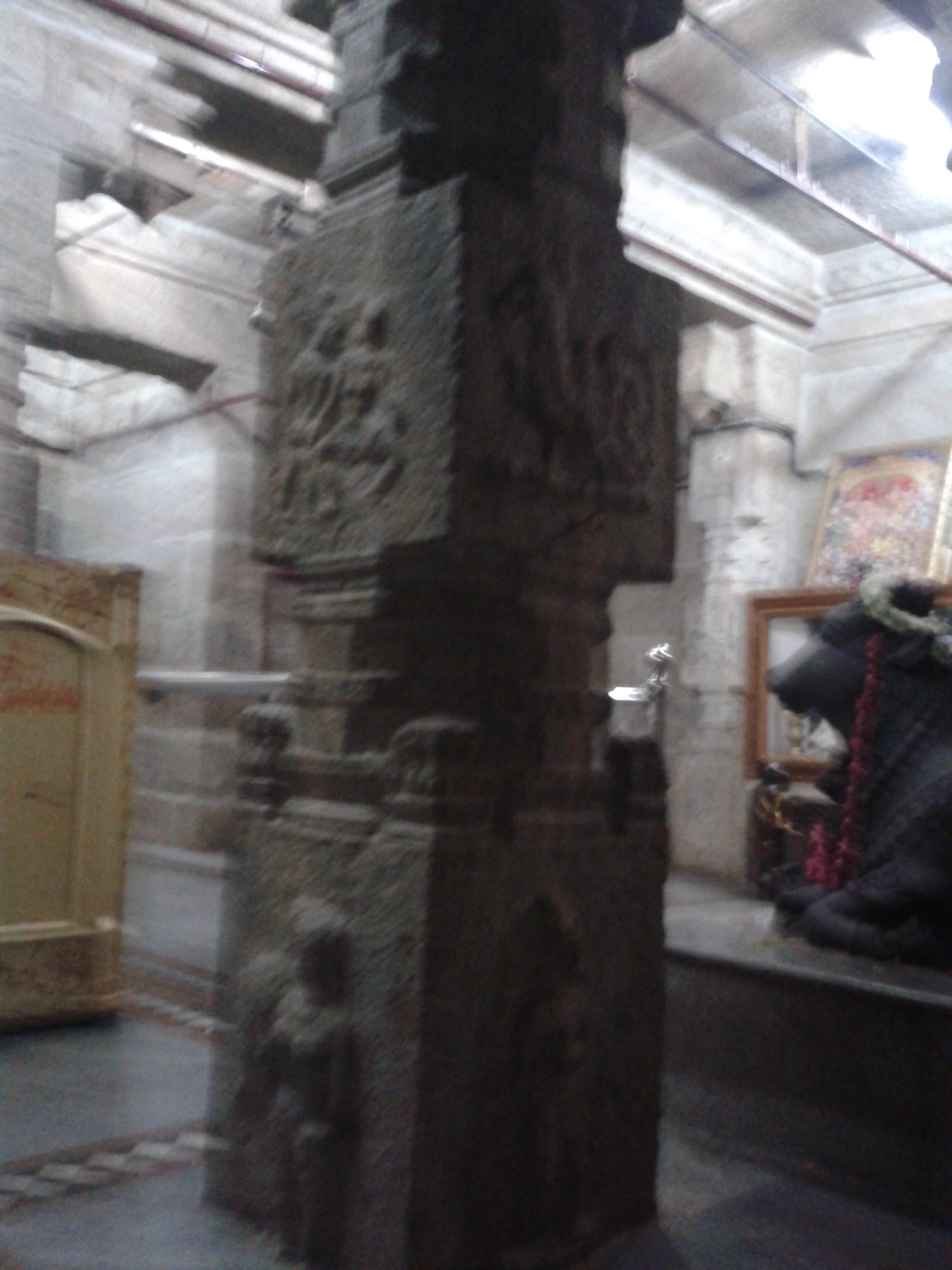
Someswara Temple,Old Madiwala, Bangalore. With four carved pillars, the artha mantapa has a large and elegantly proportioned granite Nandi facing the linga.

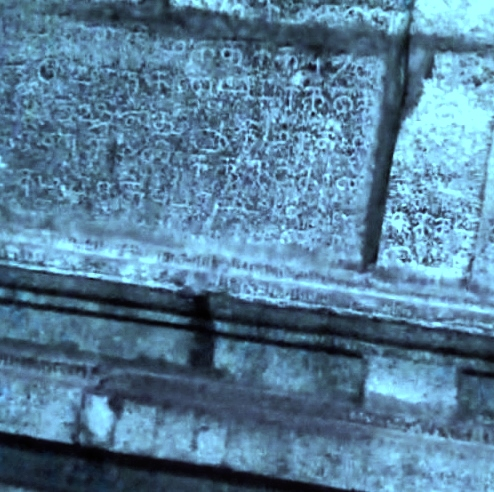
Tamil Inscription, Someswara Temple, Old Madivala, Bangalore. The earliest record dates to 1247 AD
