= Domlur Chokkanathaswamy temple =

Chokkanathaswamy temple

Religion
- Affiliation: Hinduism
- District: Bangalore
- Deity: Lord Vishnu

Location
- Location: Bangalore
- State: Karnataka
- Country: India
- Interactive map of Chokkanathaswamy temple

Architecture
- Completed: 1200 CE

Chokkanathaswamy temple, at Domlur in the Indian city of Bangalore, Karnataka, India, is dedicated to the deity known as Chokkanathaswamy or Chokka Perumal (the Hindu god Vishnu). It is one of the oldest temples in the city . The temple has numerous Kannada and Tamil inscriptions that have been documented in the Epigraphia Carnatica Vol 9, Bangalore District (1905ed). Based on these inscriptions the temple is at least as old as 1200 CE.

== History ==
This Chokkanathaswamy temple is considered is amongst the older temples in Bangalore. There are several notable sculptures and decorative features in the complex and the temple faces east. One Tamil inscription dated 1270 CE on a door frame states that the doors were donated by one Alagiyar and another inscription says of donation by one Talaikattu and one more inscription dated 1290 CE states that Poysala Vira Ramanada made donations to the temple. Vijayanagara style Navaranga and pillars are later editions.

Chola stone art 10th century - Hindu god Vishnu in Chokkanathaswamy Temple

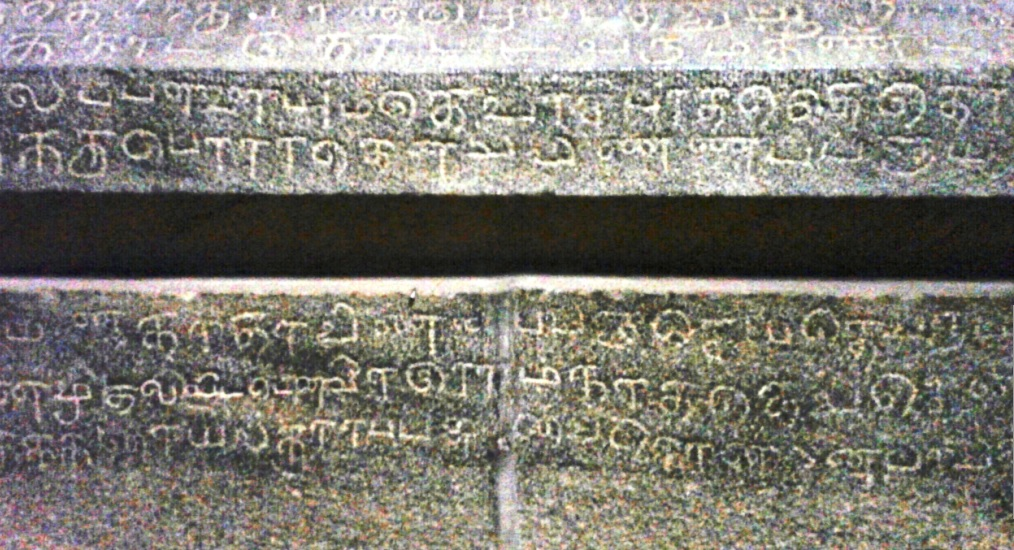
Tamil inscription, 10th century Chola temple, Domlur, Bangalore

== Tamil inscriptions ==
The Chokkanathaswamy Temple is considered at least as old as 1200 CE based on inscriptions in the temple and documented in the Epigraphia Carnatica Vol 9, located in Domlur. There are a number of Tamil inscriptions in the temple. Domlur is called as Tombalur or Desimanikkapattanam in these inscriptions. Chakravarthi Posalaviraramanatha Deva has left inscriptions with directions to temple authorities of his kingdom. Further some inscriptions record the tributes, taxes and tolls made to the temple by Devaraya II of Vijayanagar Empire, which state the houses, wells, land around Tombalur were offered to the deity Sokkapperumal. Another Tamil inscription dated 1270 talks about 2 door posts being donated by Alagiyar. Yet another inscription in Tamil details Talaikkattu and his wife donating lands from Jalapalli village and Vinnamangalam tank to the deity. A 1290 CE inscription talks about donation of ten pens from the revenue of Tommalur by Poysala vira Ramananda.

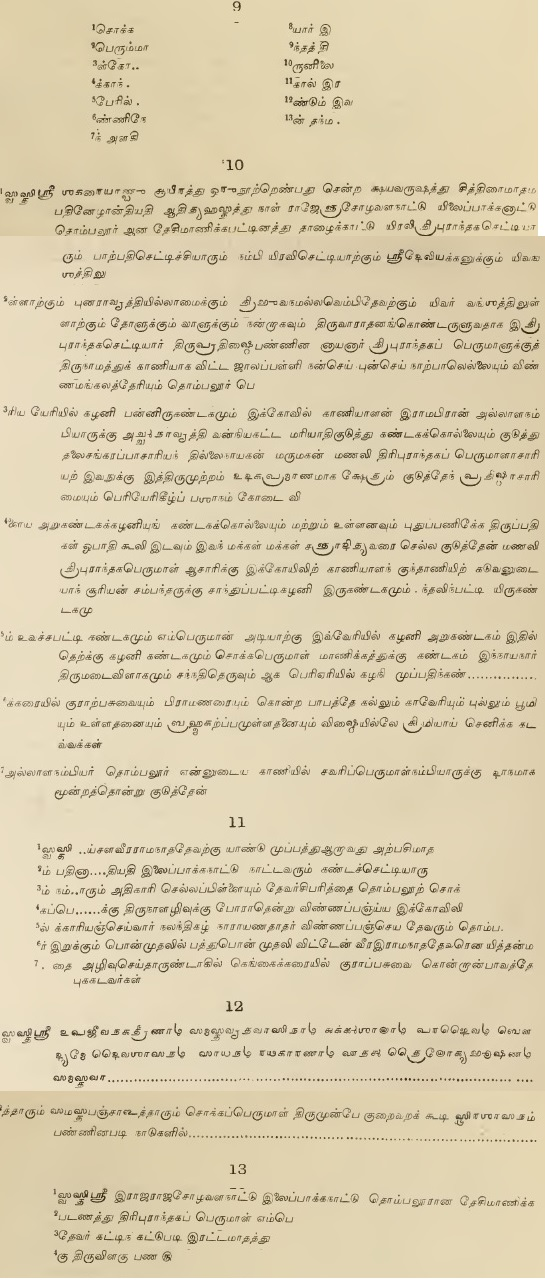
Tamil inscriptions of the Domlur Chokkanathaswamy Temple, Bangalore

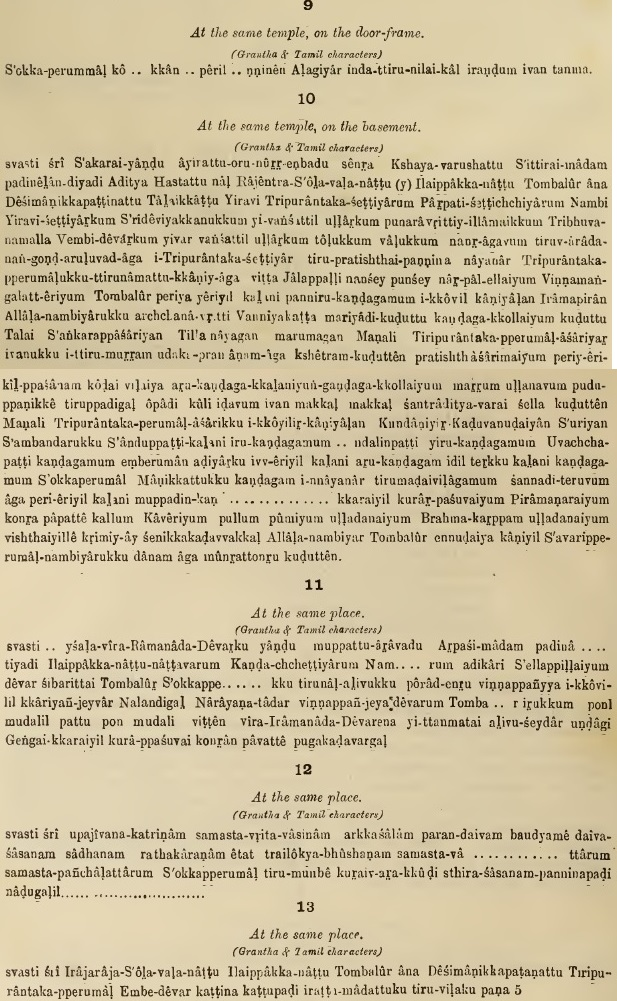
Roman script of the Tamil inscriptions of the Domlur Chokkanathaswamy Temple, Bangalore

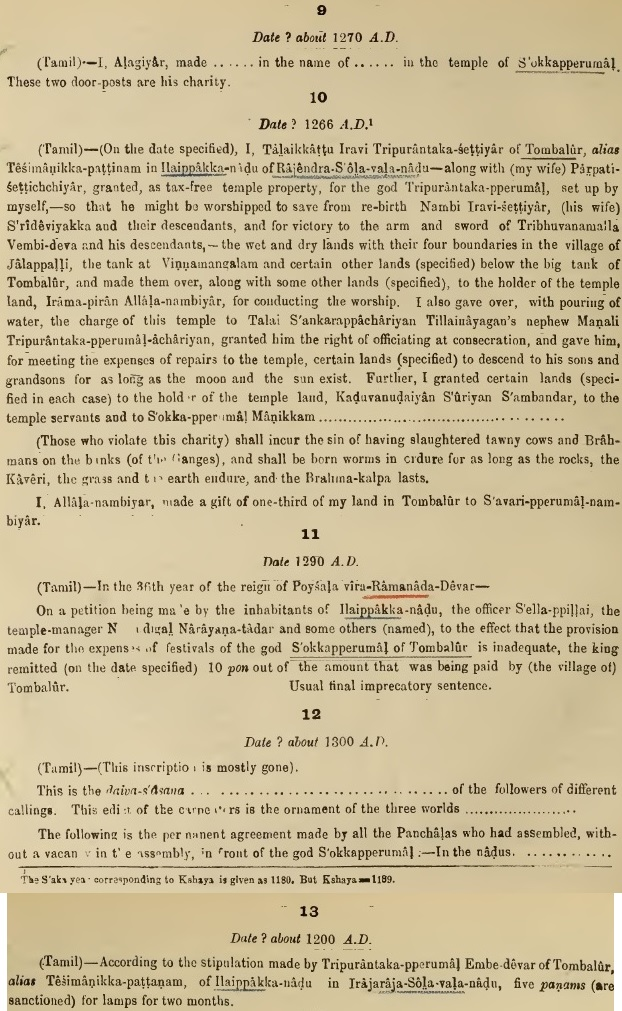
English translations of the Tamil inscriptions of the Domlur Chokkanathaswamy Temple, Bangalore

== Present ==
The temple has been extensively renovated several times and only the sanctum sanctorum and two ardhamantapas exhibit antiquity. The images of Vishnu, Sridevi and Bhudevi established in Garbhagraha are carved out of Shaligrama stone brought from Gandaki river, in Nepal.

== Temple timings ==
Daily: Morning: 6:00 am – 11:00 am, Evening: 5:45 pm – 8:30 pm

Wednesday: Morning: 6:00 am – 11:30 am, Evening: 5:45 pm – 8:30 pm

Saturday: Morning: 6:00 am – 12:30 pm, Evening: 5:45 pm – 9:00 pm
