= Marathahalli =

Suburb in Bangalore, Karnataka, India

- suburb
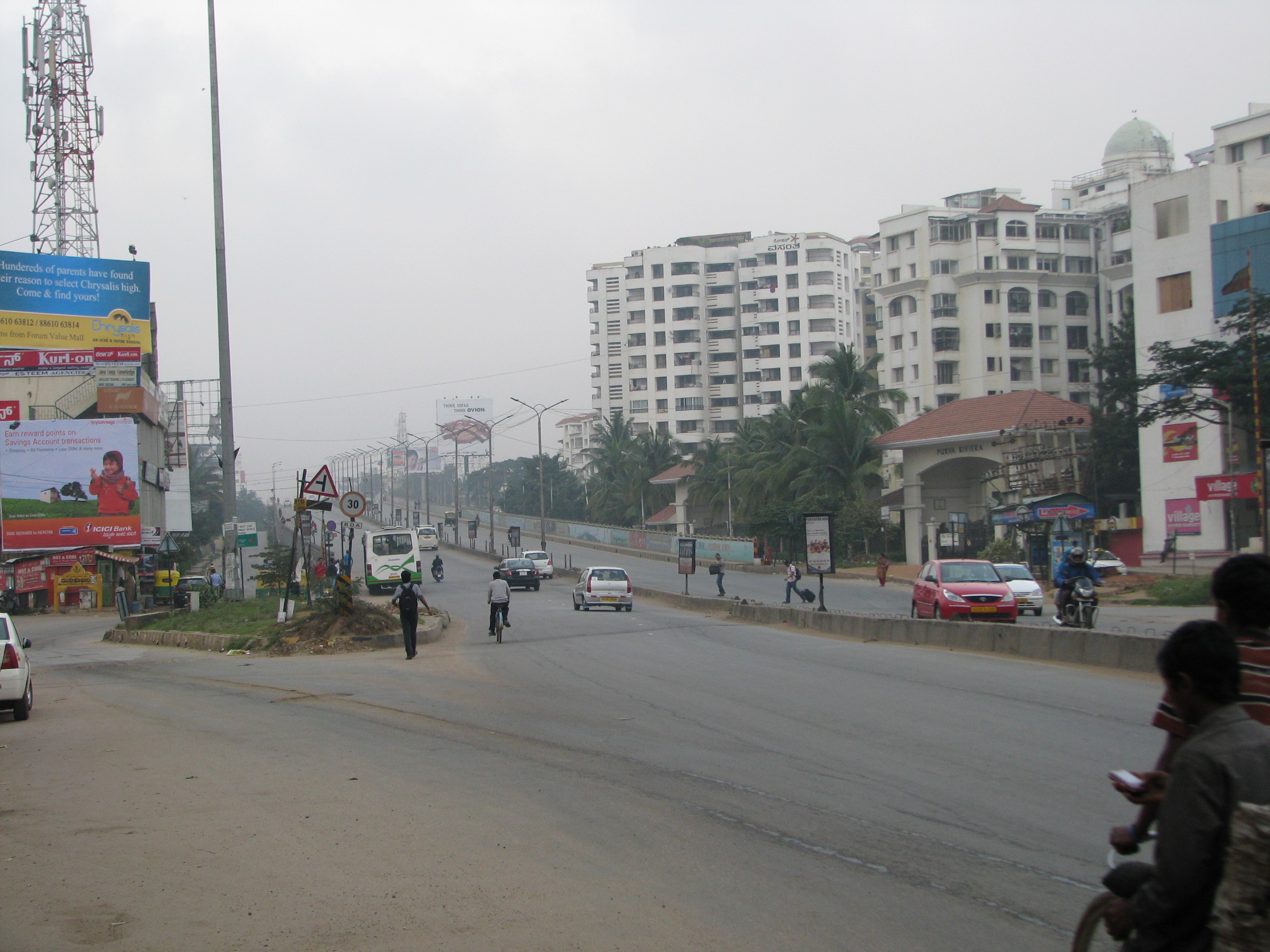
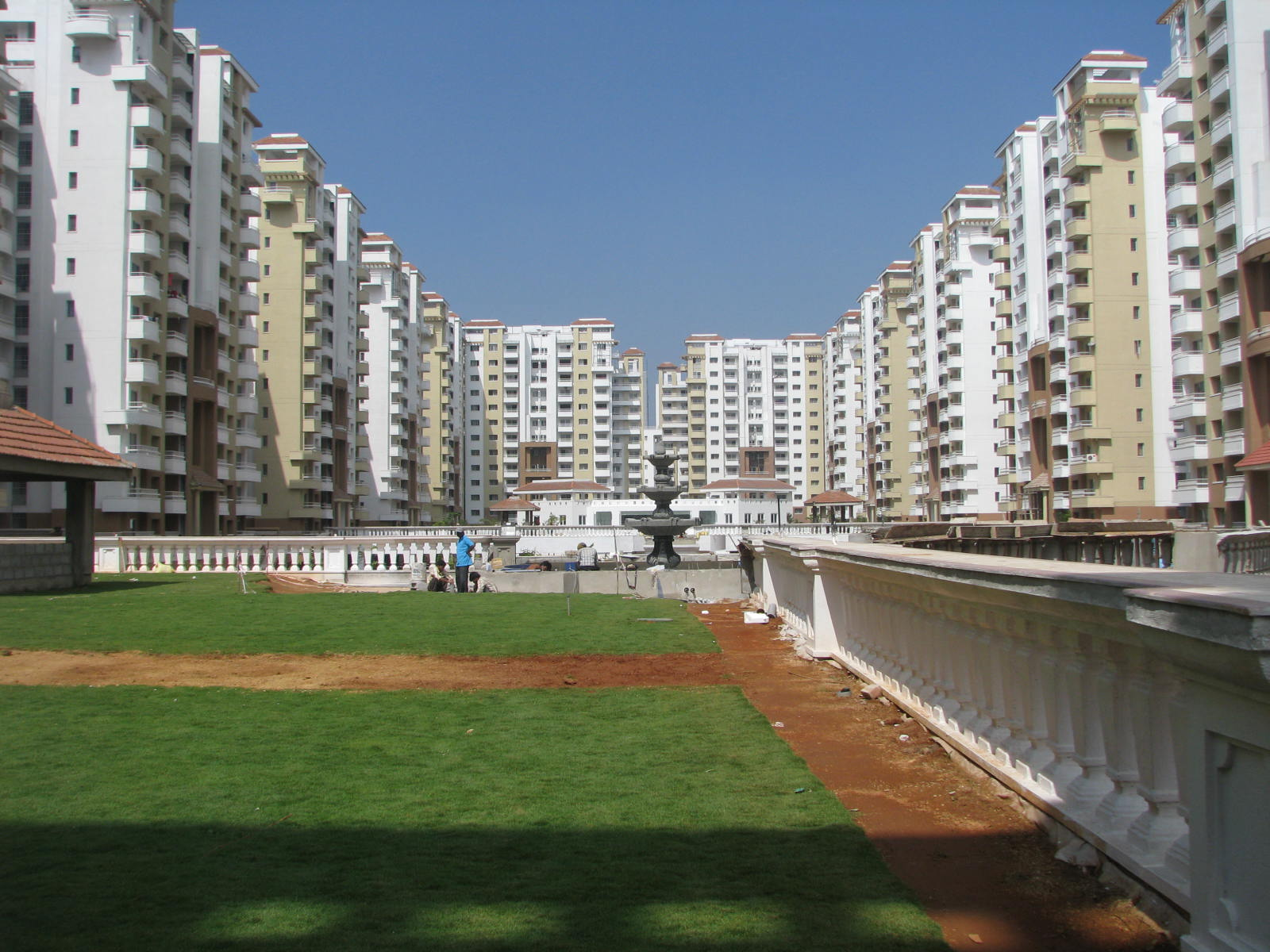
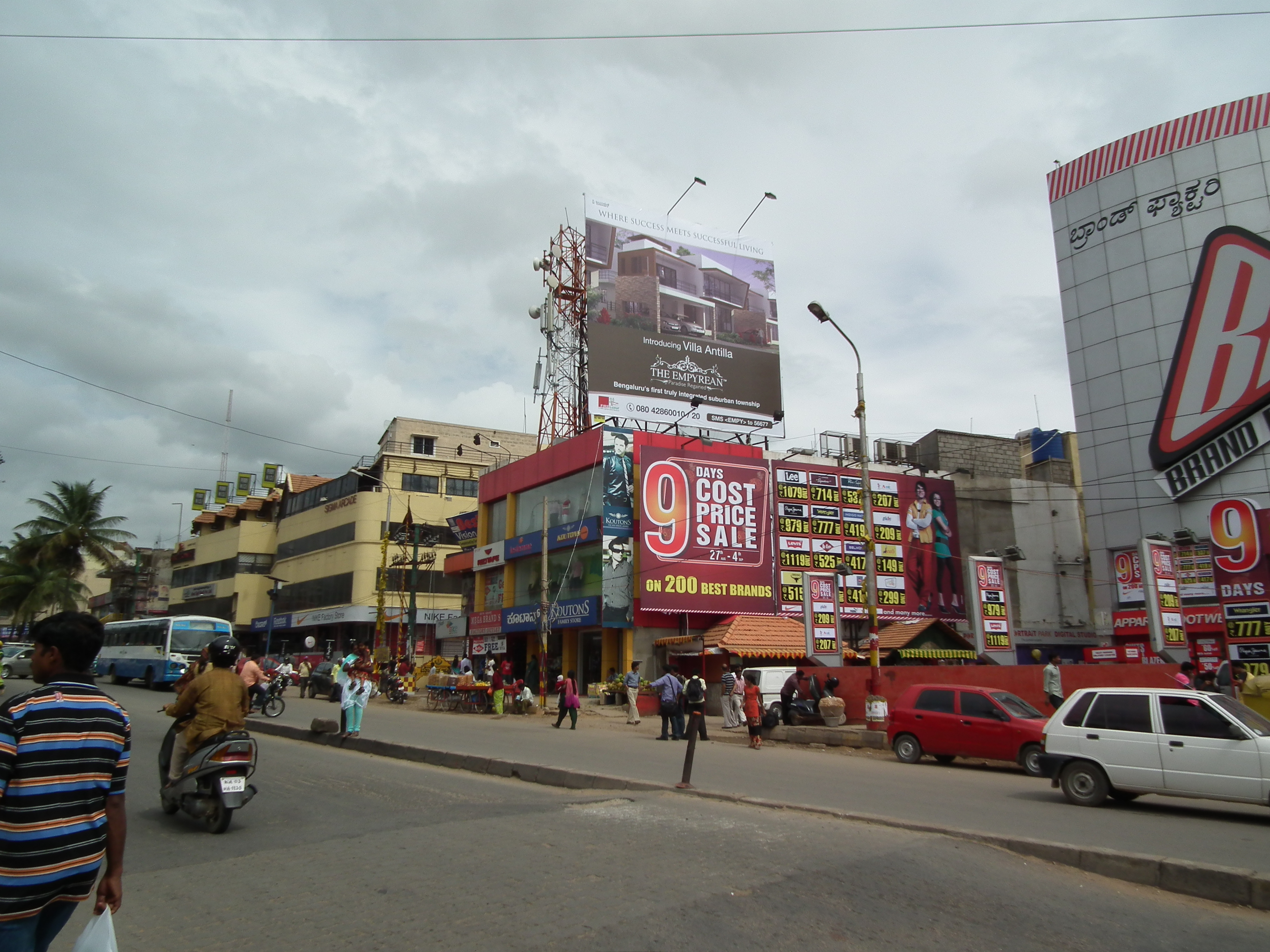
- (L-R from top) Marathahalli Bridge, an apartment complex in Marathahalli, a view of Old Airport Road

- Location within Bengaluru
- Coordinates: 12.956194°N 77.701943°E
- Country: India
- State: Karnataka
- District: Bangalore
- Metro: Bangalore

Languages
  - Official: Kannada
- Time zone: UTC+5:30 (IST)
- PIN: 560037
- Telephone code: 080
- Vehicle registration: KA-03

Marathahalli (ISO: Māratahaḷḷi) is a major eastern suburb of Bengaluru in Karnataka, India. It is infamous for its traffic and is a cheaper choice for IT employees to live in because of its close proximity to the IT clusters in Mahadevapura, Bellandur, International Tech Park, and Whitefield. It is famous for its large Telugu community and is known as 'Little Andhra', which has led to many businesses being established in the local area catering specifically to their tastes. It is also famous for hosting a wide array of factory outlets thus becoming a major destination for consumers looking for premium brands for a cheaper price.

== Connectivity ==
Marathahalli has connectivity with the rest of the city; sitting on the junction of Outer Ring Road and the Old Airport Road; it is a junction and also one of the few places in the entire city to connect the rest of the city to the newer IT cluster and bigger IT cluster in Whitefield. It features an underpass at the main junction carrying the ORR traffic and also a bridge carrying the traffic of Old Airport Road over a railway line. Despite the presence of a railway line, it has no railway station with the nearest being Bellandur Road. The airport is located approximately 42 km from Marathahalli.
