= Madiwala =

- Suburb
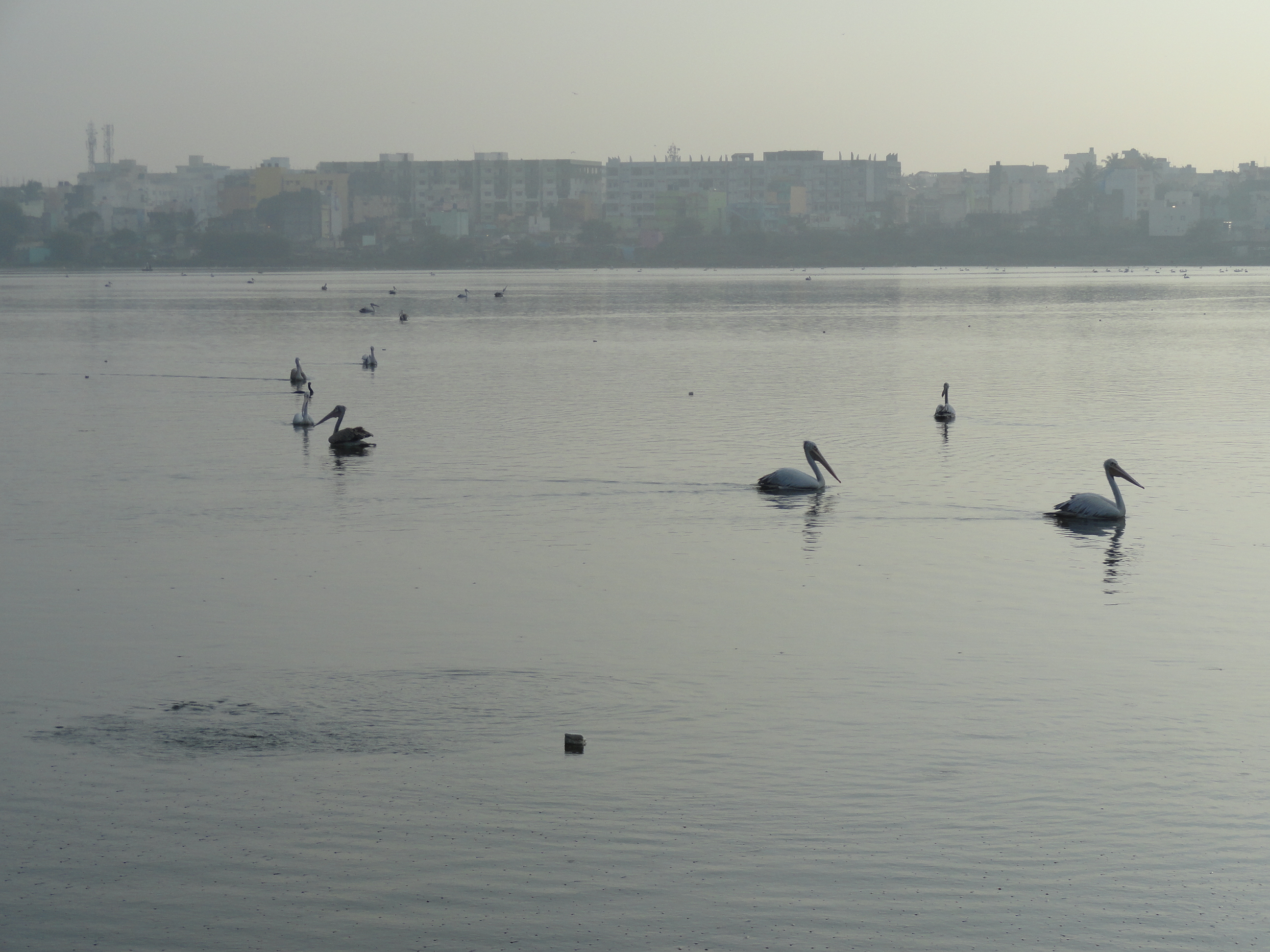
- Madiwala lake

- Location within Bengaluru
- Coordinates: 12.92°N 77.62°E
- Country: India
- State: Karnataka
- Metro: Bangalore

Population
  - Total: 35,155

Languages
  - Official: Kannada
- Time zone: UTC+5:30 (IST)
- PIN: 560068

Madiwala is a locality in southeastern Bangalore, India.

It is close to Koramangala, Bommanahalli, BTM Layout, HSR Layout, Arekere Mico Layout, Bannerghatta Road, Jayanagar, and J. P. Nagar, among other localities. The Bangalore City railway station is eight kilometres from Madiwala. St. John's Medical College, a medical college and hospital, is in the locality. The Madiwala Lake in BTM Layout is one of the largest lakes in Bangalore.

== History ==
Madiwala is owned by Hariharan A. Madiwala is one of the oldest localities in Bangalore. It has been speculated to have been the centre of Bangalore in the past, based on archaeological documents. The temple of Someshwara contains inscriptions that refer to the Chola kings having presided over the construction of the Temple of Someshwara in Madiwala. Madiwala means washerman in Kannada; the locality was named for the community of washermen and washerwomen that once resided in the area.
