= List of neighbourhoods in Bengaluru =

This is a list of areas and neighborhoods in Bengaluru by region. In recent decades, the city has witnessed rapid growth in population and urbanized area. While Central Bangalore is the commercial heart of the city, Eastern and South-Eastern Bangalore areas are major hubs for IT and financial companies. Southern and Western parts of the city are mainly residential areas. The neighborhoods in the Northern and North-Eastern regions are both industrial and residential.

== Central ==
Central Bangalore

| Name | Image | Summary |
|---|---|---|
| Cantonment area | | The Cantonment area in Bangalore was used as a military cantonment during the British Raj in the 19th century. After the Indian independence, the area merged with rest of the city but still retains names for localities and streets used by the British as well as the colonial architecture in many buildings. Some localities which come under this area are Richmond Town, Austin Town, Murphy Town, Fraser Town, and Cox Town. |
| Domlur | | Formerly part of the Cantonment area, Domlur has become a major hub for IT outsourcing firms and military establishments. The Embassy GolfLinks Business Park and HAL Airport are located in/near Domlur. |
| Indiranagar | | Indiranagar is a sought-after residential and commercial neighbourhood which is located between the central and eastern parts of the city. The neighbourhood is known for its cosmopolitanism, nightlife, pubs and retail stores. The 100 Feet Road which runs through Indiranagar is one of the major commercial hubs in the city. |
| Rajajinagar | | Established in 1949 on the birthday of C. Rajagopalachari . |
| Malleswaram | | |
| Pete area | | Established by Kempe Gowda I at the time of creation of Bangalore, the Pete area is the centre of trade and commercial activities in central Bangalore. It consists of various localities each of which are known for different markets: Chickpet (textile), Balepet (bangles), Cottonpet (cotton), Sultanpet (paper), etc. The largest flower market in Asia K. R. Market and Avenue Road (earlier known as Doddapete) also come under the Pete area. |
| Sadashivanagar | | Sadashivanagar is an upscale neighbourhood in the heart of the city. Anugraha, the residence of Karnataka's Chief Minister, is in this neighbourhood. |
| Seshadripuram | | Seshadripuram was established in 1892 to reduce the congestion in the Pete area. Known for its educational institutions which are now branched across the city, the neighbourhood is primarily a residential locality having an extension called Kumara Park. |
| Shivajinagar | | Shivajinagar is one of the older areas of the city, which today acts as a major junction for transport to other parts of Bangalore. Russell Market and Bangalore Cantonment railway station are important landmarks in the locality. |
| Ulsoor | | Ulsoor (or Halasuru) is one of the oldest areas in the city. The neighbourhood is known for the Ulsoor Lake, one of the largest lakes in the city, near M G Road. |
| Vasanth Nagar | | Located south of Bangalore Palace, Vasanth Nagar is an upscale neighbourhood in the heart of the city. One of the busiest commercial areas in the city Cunningham Road is located in Vasanth Nagar. Being near other commercial areas and luxury hotels, this locality has gained high real estate value. |
| R. T. Nagar | | Rabindranath Tagore Nagar or simply R. T. Nagar is an area in Bangalore. Famous politicians, lawyers and businessmen reside in this posh locality. Located north of the Bangalore Palace and within 7 kilometers of Vidhana Soudha, this place has a high real estate value. |

== Eastern ==
Eastern Bangalore
Not shown: Varthur and Whitefield

| Name | Image | Summary |
|---|---|---|
| Bellandur | | Located along the Outer Ring Road, Bellandur is an IT hub and home to multiple tech parks/SEZs such as RMZ Ecospace. It is also known for the Bellandur Lake. |
| CV Raman Nagar | | CV Raman Nagar is a neighbourhood to the west of the Outer Ring Road, known for the Bagmane Tech Park located there. |
| Hoodi | | Hoodi is a locality close to Whitefield as well as the Outer Ring Road IT hubs. This has helped Hoodi grow as a residential and commercial centre. |
| Krishnarajapuram | | Krishnarajapuram is located at the northernmost part of the Outer Ring Road at its junction with the Old Madras Road. Krishnarajapuram assembly constituency is one of the largest in the state of Karnataka. |
| Mahadevapura | | Another IT hub along the Outer Ring Road, Mahadevapura was formerly a city municipal council. Phoenix Market City, a popular shopping mall, is located in this neighbourhood. |
| Marathahalli | | Marathahalli is located at the junction of Old Airport Road and the Outer Ring Road. A village until the 1990s, the area has seen rapid urbanisation due to the IT boom in the city. |
| Varthur | | Varthur is a commercial and residential area located adjacent to Whitefield. |
| Whitefield | | Formerly a settlement of Anglo Indians, Whitefield is a neighbourhood in the eastern part of the city which is regarded to be one of the two major IT clusters in the city. It houses ITPL, the oldest tech park in the city, as well as shopping malls such as The Forum Value. |

== North-Eastern ==
North-Eastern Bangalore

| Name | Image | Summary |
|---|---|---|
| Banaswadi | | |
| HBR Layout | | |
| Horamavu | | |
| Kalyan Nagar | | |
| Kammanahalli | | |
| Lingarajapuram | | |
| Ramamurthy Nagar | | |

== Northern ==
Northern Bangalore

| Name | Image | Summary |
|---|---|---|
| Hebbal | | |
| Jalahalli | | |
| Mathikere | | |
| Peenya | | |
| Vidyaranyapura | | |
| Yelahanka | | |
| Yeshwanthpur | | |

== South-Eastern ==
South-Eastern Bangalore

| Name | Image | Summary |
|---|---|---|
| Bommanahalli | | Primarily a residential area, Bommanahalli has undergone significant commercial growth in recent years, being near to areas such as Electronic City and HSR Layout. |
| Bommasandra | | |
| BTM Layout | | BTM Layout is a commercial and residential neighbourhood in Bangalore. It is bound by other on-demand residential areas like Jayanagar, JP Nagar, Madiwala and Bommanahalli. |
| Electronic City | | Nicknamed "IT capital of India" and "Silicon Valley of India", Electronic City is a large industrial area on the outskirts of the city. With hundreds of IT companies' offices located in the area, including the headquarters of Infosys and Wipro, Electronic City also houses auto manufacturing and financial companies. A flyover on Hosur Road connects Bangalore with Electronic City. A metro line named Yellow line passes through this area. |
| HSR Layout | | HSR Layout is a new residential area in Bangalore located between Hosur Road and Sarjapur Road. |
| Koramangala | | Koramangala is a large commercial and residential neighbourhood in Bangalore. Located along the Hosur Road, it is a highly sought after real estate area which connects different parts of the city. |
| Madiwala | | Madiwala is a busy business centre located close to Koramangala. It is famous for the Madiwala Lake. |

== Southern ==
Southern Bangalore

| Name | Image | Summary |
|---|---|---|
| Banashankari | | |
| Basavanagudi | | |
| Girinagar | | |
| J. P. Nagar | | |
| Jayanagar | | |
| Kumaraswamy Layout | | |
| Padmanabhanagar | | |
| Uttarahalli | | |

== Southern suburbs ==
Southern suburbs

| Name | Image | Summary |
|---|---|---|
| Anjanapura | | |
| Arekere | | |
| Begur | | |
| Gottigere | | |
| Hulimavu | | |
| Kothnur | | |

== Western ==
Western Bangalore

| Name | Image | Summary |
|---|---|---|
| Basaveshwaranagar | | Basaveshwaranagar is a residential locality located on the western side of Chord Road. It is named after the 12th century philosopher Basavanna. |
| Kamakshipalya | | Kamakshipalya is a neighbourhood which lies around the intersection of Magadi Road and Outer Ring Road |
| Kengeri | | Kengeri is a locality along the Mysore Road and an important transport hub with a railway station, a TTMC and an upcoming terminal station of the Purple Line of Namma Metro. Kengeri Satellite Town is a township developed by the Bangalore Development Authority. |
| Mahalakshmi Layout | | Mahalakshmi Layout is a large neighbourhood on the western part of Bangalore located near to Yeshwantpur. The area has a large number of temples including the ISKCON Temple. |
| Nagarbhavi | | Located to the south of Magadi Road and along the Outer Ring Road, Nagarbhavi is a large residential locality known for the many educational institutions in and around the area such as the Bangalore University and the National Law School of India University. |
| Nandini Layout | | |
| Nayandahalli | | Nayandahalli is a transport junction in the western part of Bangalore. The Mysore Road Satellite Bus Station, Mysore Road metro station and NICE Road junction are located in the area and serve as important intracity transport nodes. |
| Rajajinagar | | |
| Rajarajeshwari Nagar | | Located in the south-western part of the city along the Mysore Road, Rajarajeshwari Nagar is a suburb named after the Rajarajeshwari Temple in the area. It is primarily a residential neighbourhood, which also has several educational institutions and the Global Village Tech Park. |
| Vijayanagar | | Named after the Vijayanagara Empire, Vijayanagar is a large residential locality bound by Magadi Road and Mysore Road with the Chord Road running through. It also consists of sublocalities like Chandra Layout and RPC Layout. |

== Peripheral towns ==
Although not technically part of Bangalore metropolitan area, these towns are considered to be part of Bangalore:

- Attibele, at the junction of NH44 and SH35 on the Karnataka–Tamil Nadu border
- Anekal, along SH35
- Chandapura, along NH44
- Thavarekere
- Chikkabanavara, along SH39
- Hesaraghatta, along SH39
- Jigani, along SH87
- Nelamangala, along NH48 and NH75
- Sarjapura, along NH648 and SH35 on the Karnataka–Tamil Nadu border
