= Neralur =

Neraluru
- suburb
- Location in Karnataka, India Neraluru (India)
- Coordinates: 12.8000900°N 77.711820°E
- Country: India
- State: Karnataka
- District: Bangalore Urban

Languages
  - Official: Kannada
- Time zone: UTC+5:30 (IST)
- PIN: 562107
- Nearest city: Bangalore
- Lok Sabha constituency: Bangalore Rural
- Vidhan Sabha constituency: Anekal

Neraluru is a village in Anekal taluk, Bangalore urban district, India. It is around 28 kilometers from Bangalore and 10 kilometers from Hosur, Tamil Nadu. The nearest mofussil towns are Attibele and Chandapura, both of which are within a 5 kilometer radius of Neralur. Electronics City, one of India's largest Information Technology parks, is around 10 kilometres from the village. A few of the villages which share its boundaries with Neralur are - Guddahatti, Balagaranahalli, Lakshmisagara, Old Chandapura, Thirumagondanahalli, Bandapura, Yadavanahalli and Bendaganahalli. Kannada is the most widely spoken language in the village.

== History ==
The name Neralur, has its origin possibly from its old name Chayapuri (which is not in much use now). The name Chayapuri (in Sanskrit) stands for village filled with shade (from Chaya=shade and puri=village) which when translated into Kannada becomes Neraluru (Chaya=Neralu and puri=ooru). The name suggests that the place was filled with huge trees that gave shade. Another speculation about the origin of the name is possibly because of a big "Black Jamun" tree (Nerale hannu in Kannada), that existed in the village.

== Transport ==
Many buses ply to Neralur from Bangalore. There is a direct BMTC(Bangalore Metropolitan Transport Corporation) bus (356K) from K R Market. A host of other BMTC and private buses, on its way to Attibele, Hosur and other nearby places, stop at the village near the National Highway 44 (Hosur Road) junction.

The Kempe Gowda International Airport at Devanahalli is at a distance of 63 kilometers from Neralur.

== Grama Panchayat ==
Neralur comes under Neralur Grama Panchayat which belongs to Bangalore Urban District, in Anekal Taluk, and part of Attibele Hobli. The Grama Panchayat office is located in Neralur village. Neralur Grama Panchayat happens to be one of the largest Grama Panchayats in Karnataka having a total of 64 elected representatives (as on year 2021) representing various strata of society. Neralur village alone contributes 14 members to the Grama Panchayat. Neralur Grama Panchayat includes nine villages under its umbrella, namely, Neralur, Thirumagondanahalli, Balagaranahalli, Icchanguru, Vaddarapalya, Yadavanahalli, Adigondanahalli, Guddahatti and Bendaganahalli. It is biggest gram panchayat in the entire Karnataka.

== Economy ==
Many industries have sprung up around the village in the recent past, which has resulted in migrant workers settling down in the village. The Attibele industrial area covers a part of the village landscape. A host of residential townships have come up in the village vicinity in the recent past. The village has a Milk Producers Cooperative society (Neraluru Haalu Uthpadhakara Sahakara Sangha) which was established in the year 1976, and since then has revolutionized lives of most of the villagers in more ways than one. Agriculture is still a thriving activity in the village in spite of the advent of townships, and industries engulfing the village landscape.

== Education ==
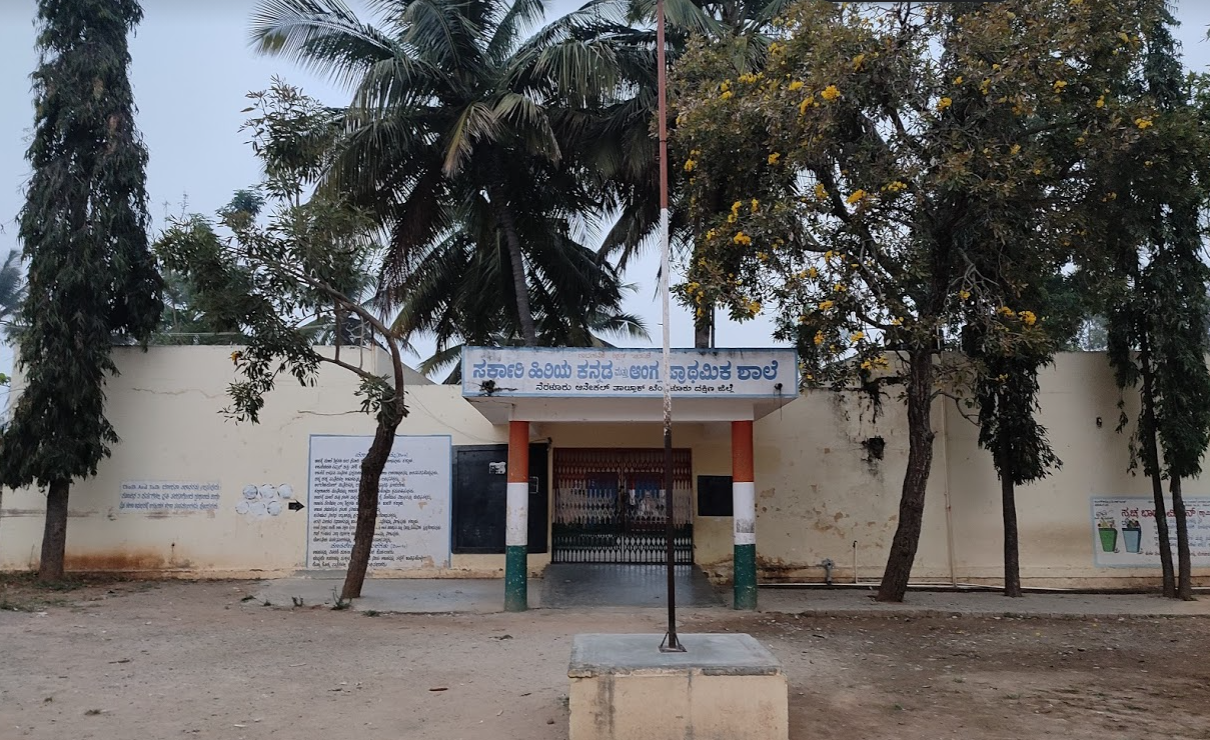
Government Higher Primary School, Neralur

There are various educational institutions situated in Neralur both in Kannada and English mediums of instruction.

== Temples in Neralur ==
Neralur is famous for its ancient temples. A few of the temples that have been mentioned here date back to at least 100 years, if not more.

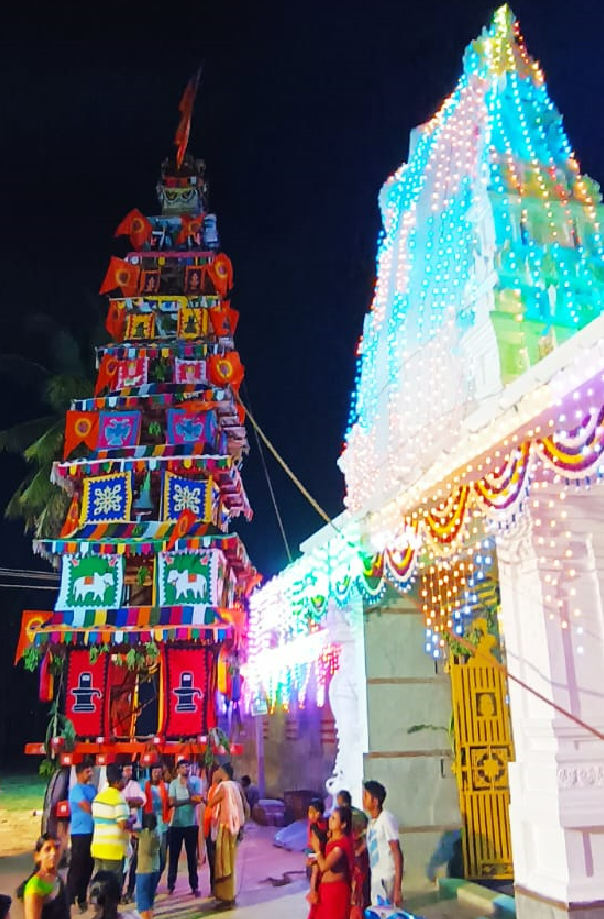
Neraluru Brahma Rathothsava Chariot at Shiva Temple:: 2023

There are many temples in the village, which have been renovated recently. Chief among them are temples dedicated to Shiva, Anjaneya, Renuka Yellamma Devi, Aggu Muneshwara and Basaveshwara. There is an annual rathotsava(theru) held in the season of March/April, where a multi layered wooden chariot is pulled by devotees through the village thoroughfares. The chariot procession starts from the Shiva (Kashi VIshwanatha) temple (Eeshwarana Gudi) and guides its way to the Yellamma Devi temple in the center of the village. The occasion is marked with religious fervor and gaiety. The chariot procession is the highlight of the festivities which last for over a week.

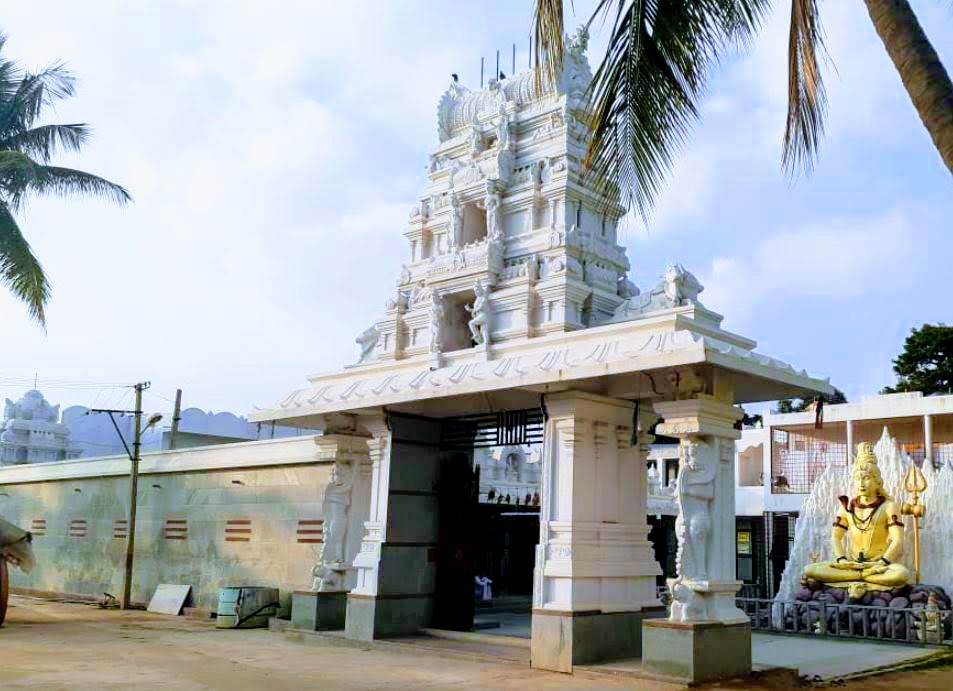
Shiva Temple - Neraluru

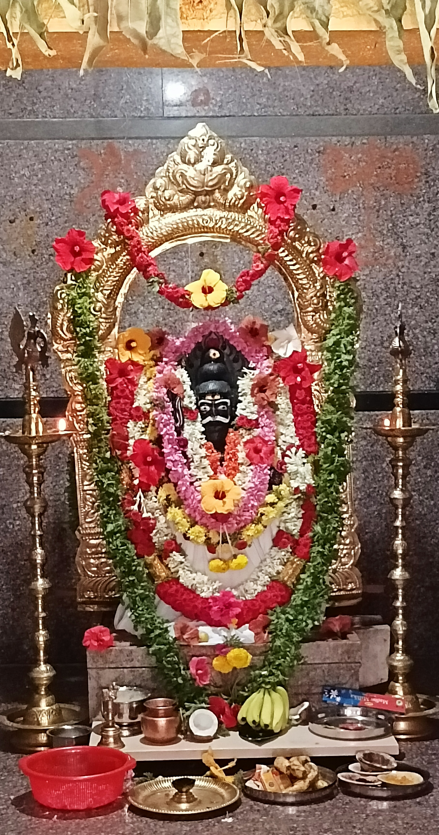
Aggu Muneshwara Swamy, Neraluru

The newly renovated Aggu Muneshwara Temple lies on the border of Neralur, Bendaganahalli, Alibommasandra, Guddahatti besides Lakshmisagara villages. Lord Muneshwara is considered as a custodian of the village, and since this abode of Muneshwara lies on the border of five villages, there is a huge ensemble of devotees from these villages who throng to the temple on major festival days. There is also an Ashram in the adjoining temple complex, which serves as a place of rest for saints and sadhus

== Gallery ==
Temples in Neralur

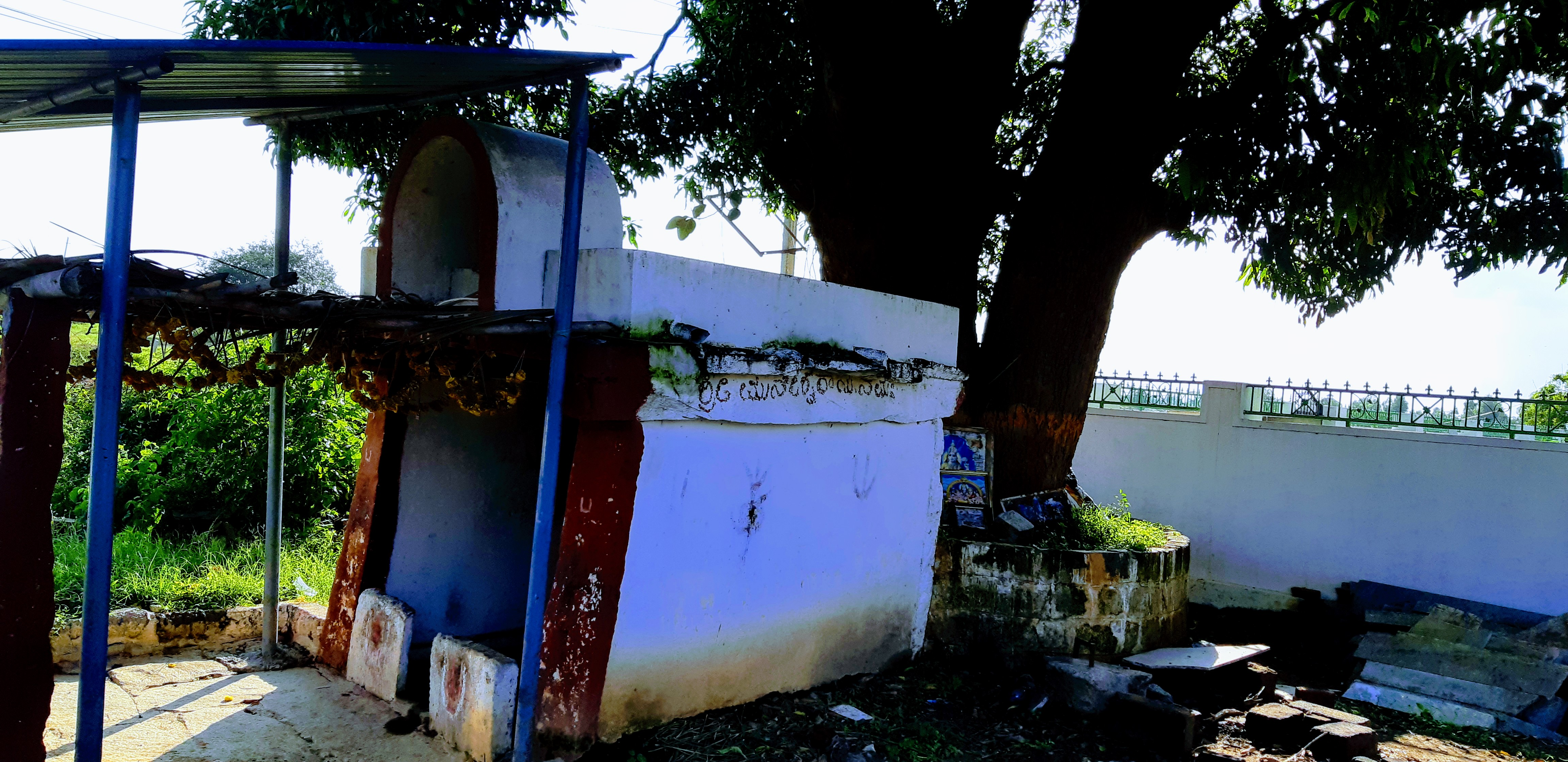
Aggu Muneshwara Temple - Neralur

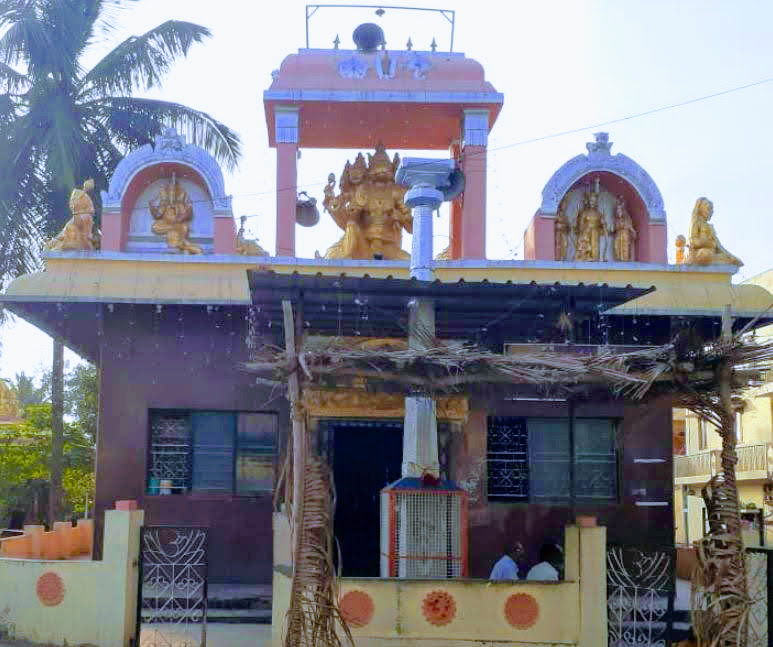
Anjaneya Temple - Neralur

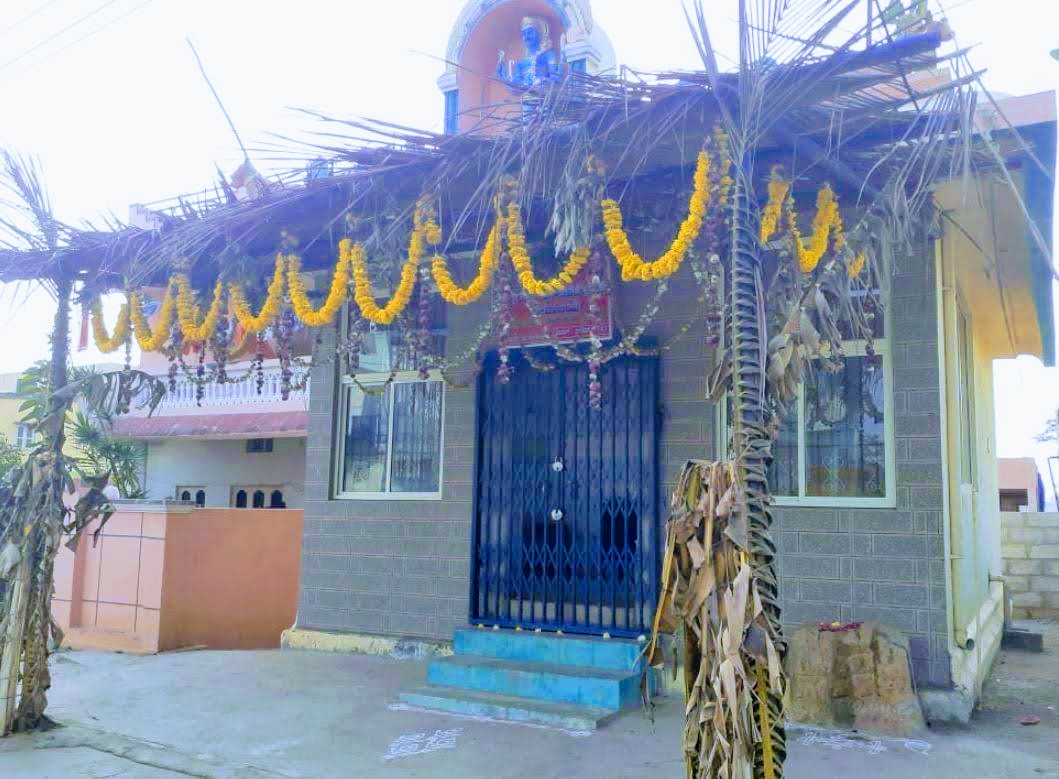
Baireshwara Temple - Neralur

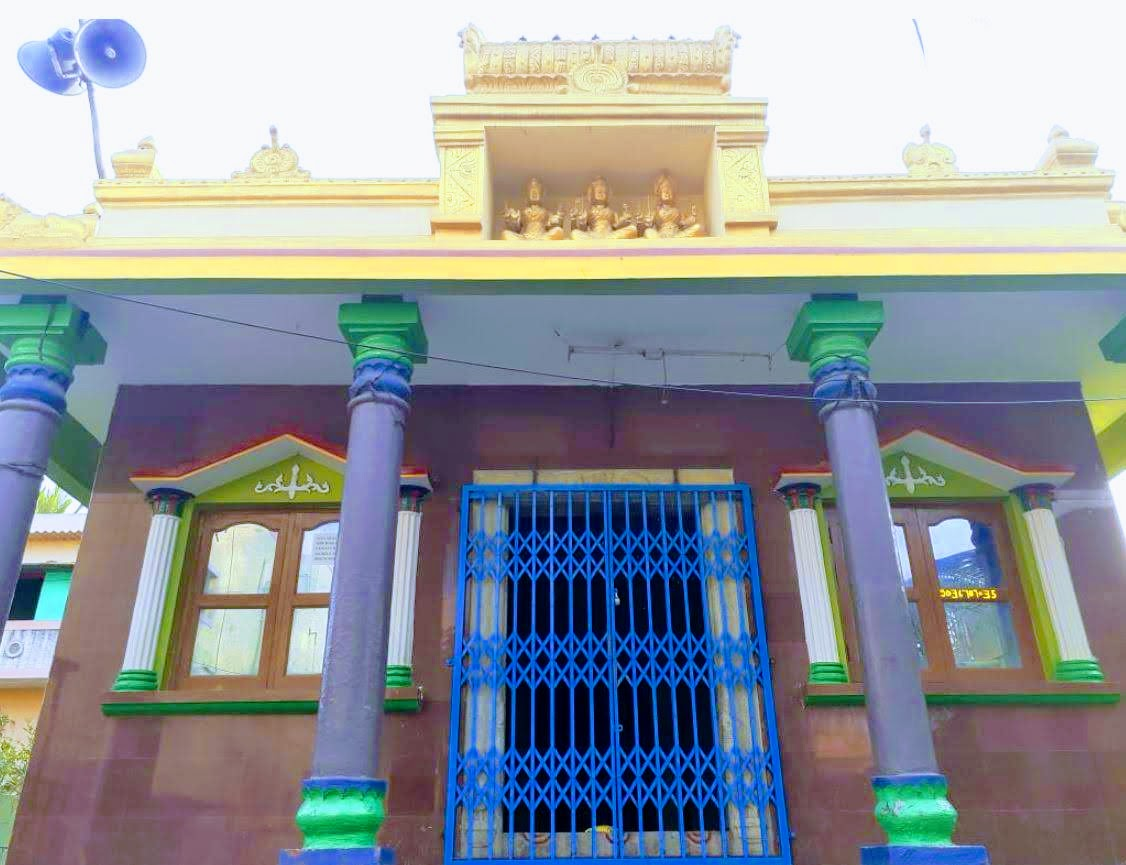
Maddhuramma Temple - Neralur

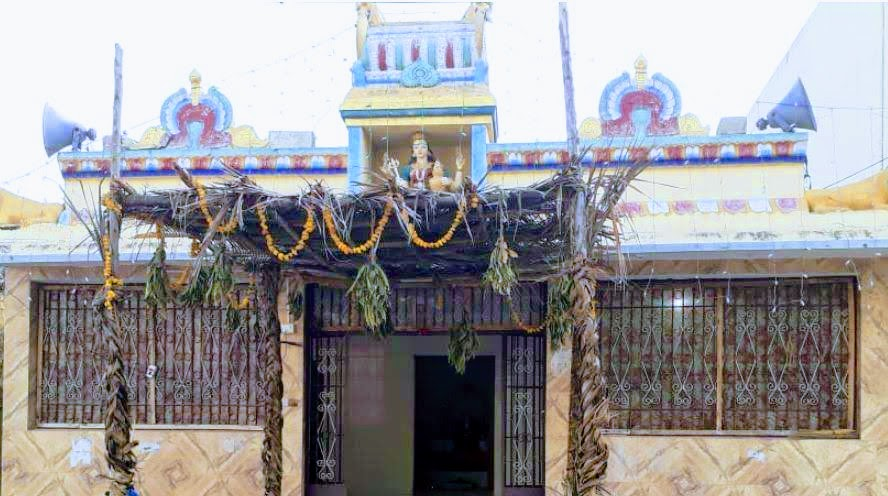
Geragamma Temple - Neralur

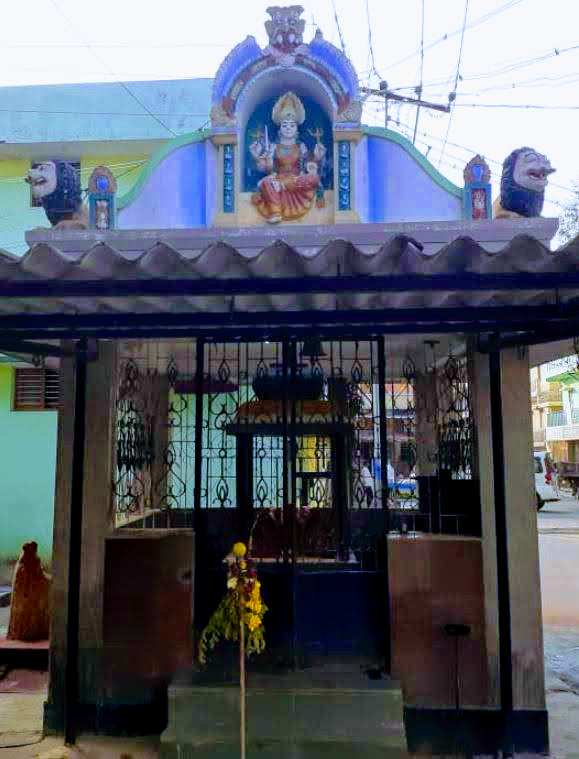
Maramma Temple - Neralur

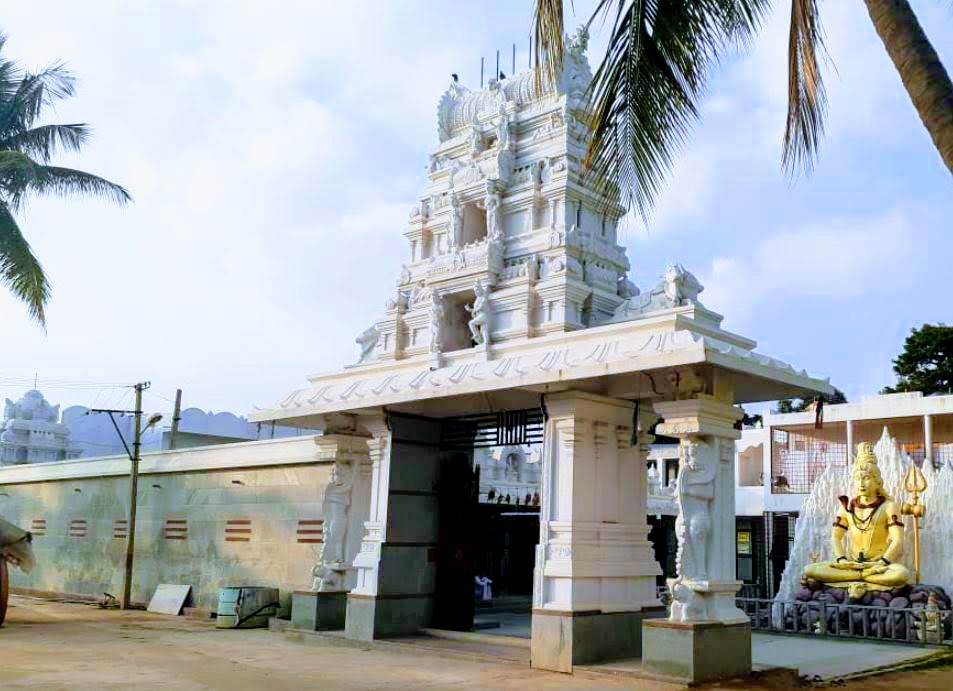
Shiva Temple - Neralur

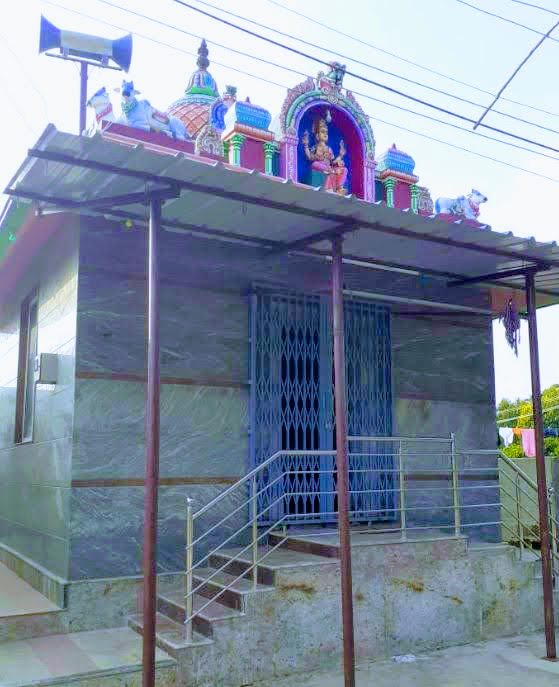
Avula Gangamma Temple - Neralur
