= State Highway 87 (Karnataka) =

State Highway in Karnataka, India

State Highway 87

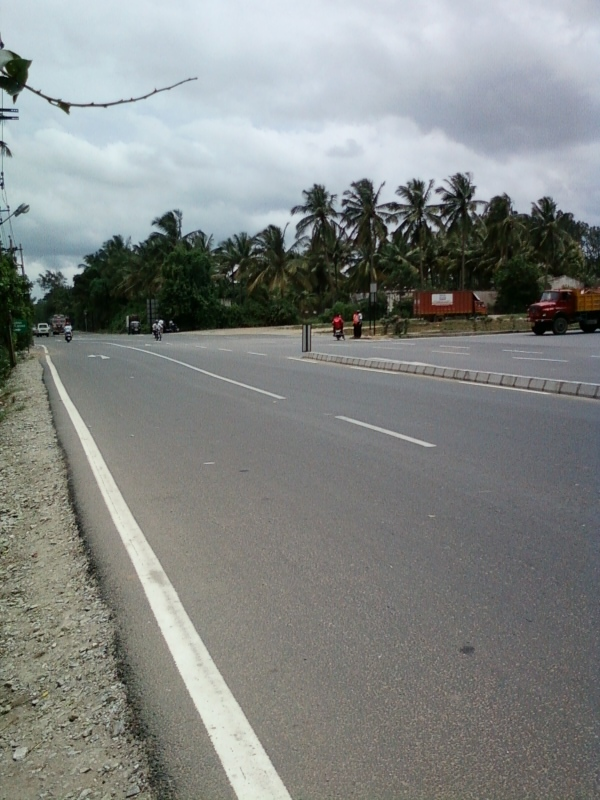
- The junction of Bannerghatta Road with NICE Road.

Route information
- Maintained by Karnataka Public Works Department, Bangalore Development Authority, Bruhat Bangalore Mahanagara Palike
- Length: 49 km (30 mi)

Major junctions
- North end: Adugodi
- Arekere, Hulimavu, Gottigere, Bannerghatta National Park, Jigani
- South end: Anekal, Bangalore urban district

Location
- Country: India
- State: Karnataka

Highway system
- Roads in India; Expressways; National; State; Asian; State Highways in Karnataka

Karnataka State Highway 87, commonly referred to by several names including Bannerghatta Road (Adugodi to Jigani via Bannerghatta), Jigani-Anekal Road and Anekal-Hosur Road, is a State Highway in the Indian state of Karnataka. It connects Bengaluru with the towns of Bannerghatta, Jigani, and Anekal, extending for 45 kilometres (28 mi). It starts as a branch from Hosur Road near the Adugodi Christian Cemetery and ends at Samanduru in Anekal taluk near Tamil Nadu State border. Inside Tamil Nadu, it continues as Major District Road (MDR) and merges with National Highway 948 A.

== History ==
In 2011, the Bruhat Bangalore Mahanagara Palike (now Greater Bangalore Authority, or GBA) announced that the road would be widened in several places, while underpasses and flyovers would be built at major junctions.

The Government of Karnataka cleared the second phase of Namma Metro, which includes the Pink Line from Kalena Agrahara on Bannerghatta Road to Nagawara in northern Bengaluru via the Indian Institute of Management Bangalore (IIM-B). The 7.5 km elevated section along Bannerghatta Road (from Kalena Agrahara to Tavarekere) opened to the public on 14 November 2026, while the remaining underground stretch to Nagawara remains under construction. The project was designed to significantly reduce the traffic load on Bannerghatta Road.

Under the upgrade plans, the road was to be widened from 20–25 metres to 45 metres at an estimated cost of ₹137 crore (US$15 million).

== Junctions and intersections ==
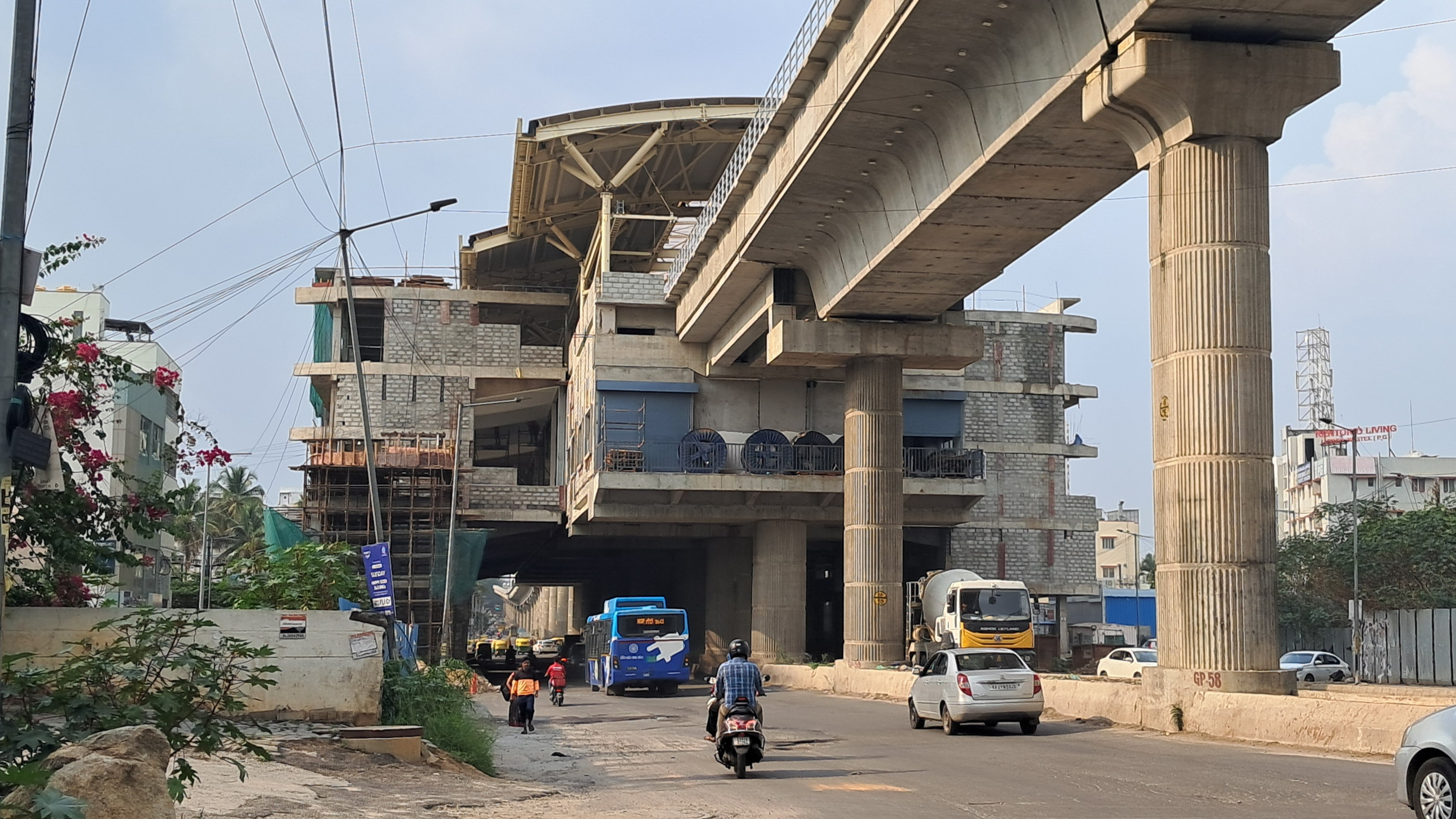
Hulimavu metro station on Pink Line (shown during construction)

Bannerghatta Road intersects several major arterial roads, including Hosur Road at Adugodi, Marigowda Road at Dairy Circle, and Marenahalli Road along with the Outer Ring Road at the Jayadeva Hospital Interchange. From the interchange, the Outer Ring Road runs concurrently with Bannerghatta Road until JD Mara Junction, in front of Vega City Mall, where it diverges to the right while Bannerghatta Road continues southward. The road also intersects NICE Road near Gottigere, where the Bangalore–Mysore Infrastructure Corridor peripheral ring road also meets State Highway 87. It meets Jigani-Bommasandra Link Road at Jigani APC Circle. Further south, it meets Chandapura-Anekal Road, Attibele-Anekal Road (State Highway 35) and Thally Road inside Anekal town.

The road features two grade-separated underpasses: the Dairy Circle Underpass and the Jayadeva Underpass. For approximately five kilometres south of the Jayadeva Underpass, the road was widened to four lanes by Mantri Developers under one of Bengaluru's earliest public–private partnership infrastructure projects.

Junctions and traffic hotspots along Bannerghatta Road
km	Location	Intersecting road(s)	Notes
0	Adugodi	Hosur Road	Northern terminus
1.8	Dairy Circle	Marigowda Road (Interchange)	Dairy Circle Underpass
2.8	Swagath Cross Signal	Tilak Nagar Main Road (Diverges)	Traffic hotspot
3.7	Gurappanapalya Signal	Jayanagar 39th Cross Road (Diverges)	Traffic hotspot
4.1	Jayadeva Hospital Interchange	Marenahalli Road (Diverges); Outer Ring Road (Merges)	Jayadeva Underpass; Outer Ring Road begins concurrent run southward; road widened ~5 km south by Mantri Developers (PPP)
5.1	JD Mara Junction	Outer Ring Road (Diverges)	Outer Ring Road turns right towards Electronic City; Bannerghatta Road continues straight
6.4	Bilekahalli	Devarachikkanahalli Road (Diverges)	Traffic hotspot
7.5	Arekere Gate	Arekere Main Road (Diverges)	Traffic hotspot
8.5	Hulimavu Gate	Hulimavu Main Road (Diverges)	Traffic hotspot
11.4	Gottigere	NICE Road (Interchange)	NICE Road intersects; SH 87 junction
16.5	Bannerghatta Circle	Bannerghatta National Park Road (Diverges)	Traffic hotspot
20.9	Koppa Gate	Koppa Road (Diverges)	Traffic hotspot
24.9	Jigani APC Circle	Jigani-Bommasandra Link Road (Diverges)	Entry point to Jigani industrial area
36.7	Anekal	Chandapura-Anekal Road (Merges); Attibele-Anekal Road SH 35 (Merges); Thally Road (Diverges)	Three-way road convergence inside Anekal town
45	Samnduru (Tamil Nadu State Border)	Continues as Major District Road inside Krishnagiri District	Southern terminus

== Religious places ==
- Sri Sri Meenakshi Sundareshwara Temple
- Santhome Parish Church
- Bilal Masjid

== Educational institutions ==
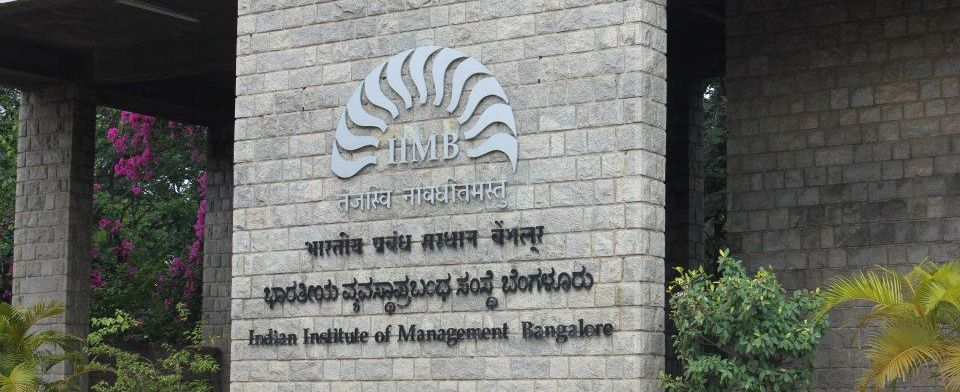
Main Entrance to IIM Bangalore

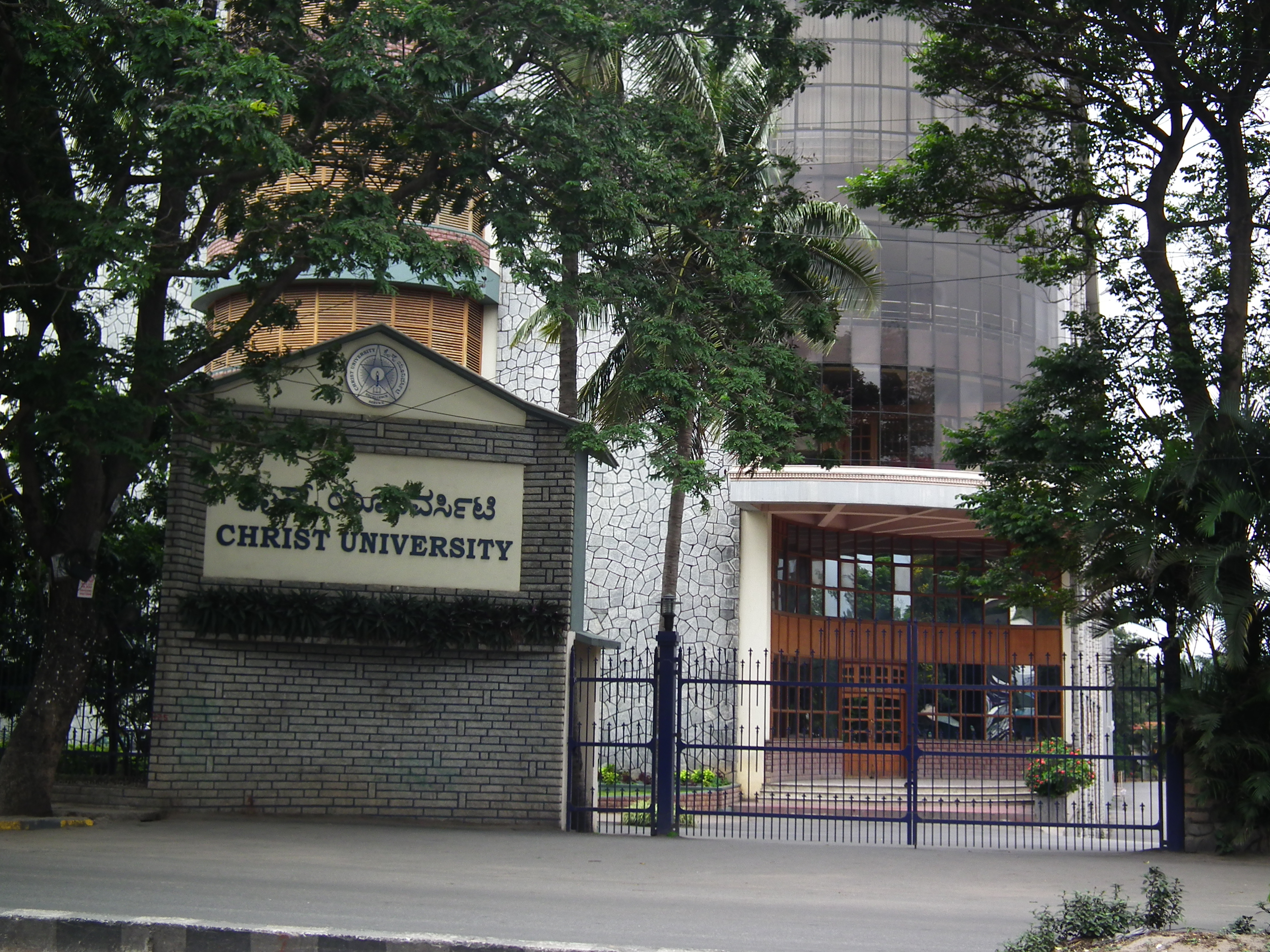
Christ University situated at Dairy Circle.

- Indian Institute of Management Bangalore, Between Bilekahalli and Arekere
- Christ University- Central Campus, Dairy Circle
- Christ University - Banngerghatta Road Campus, Hulimavu
- AECS Magnolia Maaruti Public School, Arekere
- Sri Chaitanya Techno School, Kothnur
- Padma Seshadri Bala Bhavan, Lakshmipura
- Sherwood High School, Basavanapura
- AMC Institutions, Kalkere
- BGS National Public School, Hulimavu, Bengaluru
- Sarala Birla Academy, Bannerghatta
- School of India, Bannerghatta

== Hospitals ==
Several major hospitals are located on this road:

Wockhardt Hospital (now Fortis Healthcare) on Bannerghatta Road in 2006.

- Sri Jayadeva Institute of Cardiovascular Sciences and Research
- Apollo Hospitals near Arekere junction
- Fortis Healthcare (previously known as Wockhardt Hospital) near Arekere Junction
- Narayana Health
- Vijayashree Hospitals

== Malls ==
Malls on Bannerghatta Road include:

- Gopalan Innovation Mall, J.P. Nagar 3rd Phase
- Shoppers Stop, B.T.M. Layout 2nd Stage
- Vega City Mall, B.T.M. Layout 2nd Stage
- Royal Meenakshi Mall, Hulimavu

== Residential Layouts ==
- Vijaya bank layout
- CP Ecofront Layout, Near Kumbaranhalli
