= Hulimavu cave Temple =

Hulimavu Cave Temple
- ಶ್ರೀ ರಾಮಲಿಂಗೇಶ್ವರ ಗುಹಾಂತರ ದೇವಾಲಯ
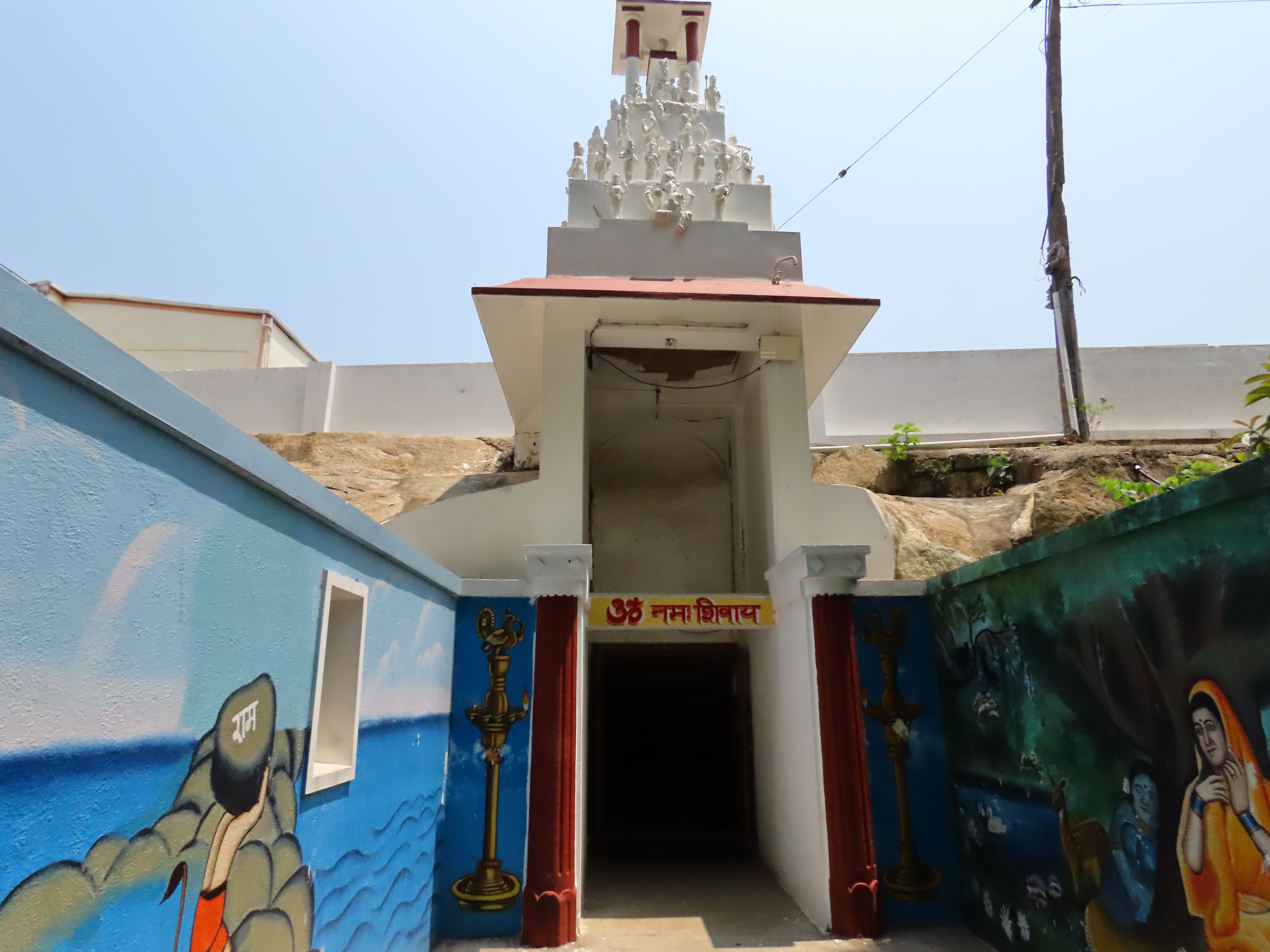
- Temple entrance

- Location in Karnataka

Religion
- Affiliation: Hinduism
- District: Bangalore
- Deity: Shiva, Ganesha, Devi

Location
- Location: Bannerghatta Road, Hulimavu
- State: Karnataka
- Country: India
- Interactive map of Hulimavu Cave Temple
- Coordinates: 12.877009°N 77.59967°E

Architecture
- Creator: Sri Sri Balagangadaraswami Mutt
- Completed: c.a. 1500–1600

Specifications
- Temple: 1
- Monument: 3
- Open Times: 6:00 AM to 12:00 PM and 17:00 PM to 19:30 All Days (Monday-Sunday)

The Hulimave cave temple, also known as the Hulimavu Shiva Cave Temple or simply the Cave Temple, is located in Hulimavu, Bannerghatta Road, Karnataka, very close to the BGS National Public School. The Cave Temple is administered by the Sri Sri Bala Gangadaraswami Mutt. It is stated that a saint Sri Ramanand Swamiji did tapas in the cave for many years and his samadhi is also found inside.

There are three main deities consecrated inside. A Shiva Lingam occupies the center, on one side there is a Devi idol and on the other side, an idol of Ganesha has been consecrated. On the other side of the cave, a very old dhyana mantap is also found. The cave has been declared as a 2000 year old single rock cave. The temple is placed within the natural cave inside the rocks. The detailed history of the temple is however not available, but it was stated that the temple is as old as 4–5 hundred years, founded by Sri Sri Balagangadaraswami.

Visitors are encouraged to learn about and go around to each of the deities inside the cave. The samadhi with the photo of the saint is also there. For unknown reasons such temples have not gained publicity even though those who know the temple visit it very often.
