= Koppa gate =

Near, Nisarga Layout of Nirman Shelters

- Junction
- Location within Karnataka
- Coordinates: 12°47′47″N 77°36′57″E
- Country: India
- State: Karnataka

Languages
  - Official: Kannada
- Time zone: UTC+5:30 (IST)

Koppa Gate is a major junction on Bannerghatta Road, the main route through southern Bengaluru, in Karnataka, India.

It is located where Begur-Koppa road crosses perpendicular at the boundary of Koppa and Harapanahalli Villages in Jigani in Anekal taluk. This is a busy junction with several small village shops, bus stops, and schools. This junction is 30 km (19 mi) from Bengaluru railway station.

The Koppa Gate junction is situated 11 km (6.8 mi) from Electronics City by Koppa-Begur road.
