= Dayananda Reddy =

Indian politician, entrepreneur, and philanthropist

Dayananda Reddy B.T MLC
- Incumbent
- Assumed office 5 January 2010

Leader of the House for Karnataka Legislative Council
- Incumbent
- Assumed office 2010

Founder of Dayananda Foundation

Personal details
- Born: 5 September 1963 (age 63) Anekal
- Party: Bharatiya Janta Party
- Profession: Social worker, politician
- Website: Dayananda Foundation

Dayananda Reddy (born 1963) is an Indian politician, entrepreneur, philanthropist and a former MLC for Bangalore Urban district at the Karnataka Legislative Council. He is known for adopting 7500 underprivileged students and giving them free education since 2010 through his foundation funded by his own businesses. Till date, the students of the foundation have planted more than 50,000 trees across Bangalore. The students have also been trained to spread awareness for keeping the city clean and green. Reddy joined the BJP in March 2018.

== Early life ==
Reddy was born to B.N. Thimma Reddy and Gowramma in 1963 at Anekal, Bengaluru Urban District. His early years were spent studying in a local government school. Later on, he got a diploma in Industrial Training.

== Professional career ==
In 1981, Reddy began an industrial unit for manufacturing and welding machine tools. In 1993, he set up Gold Coins Farms and Housing Developers Limited, along with the Gold Coins Club.

He formed the Dayananda Foundation in 2010 (as an initiative of his Bharath Goldstar Group) to address youth unemployment in India. As of date, the foundation has adopted nearly 7500 underprivileged students in Karnataka, providing them free education and employment support.

== Political career ==
Reddy was elected the president of the Bommasandra Industrial Association in 2004. In 2010, he was elected as a Member of the Legislative Council (MLC) of Karnataka, representing the Bangalore Urban district. During 2009–2016, he also served as the Deputy Leader of the Opposition in Karnataka, representing the Indian National Congress.

In 2015, the Karnataka Congress denied Reddy a ticket for the upcoming council polls, following which he contested the elections as a rebel candidate. In March 2018, he joined the Karnataka faction of the BJP.

== Criminal Intent & Rowdyism ==
The ex-MLC also runs several businesses that hinder regular life in Bengaluru including a cancer-causing m-sand business at Saul Kere and threatening residents of Neela Apartment & denying them water.

== Awards and honor ==
- In 2009, the All India Intellectual Society awarded him 'The Great Son of Karnataka' prize
- In 2008, he was honored by the Federation of Karnataka Chamber of commerce
- In 2004, he won the 'Aryabhatta Award' for lifetime contribution to the society
- He has also won the 'Thamra Human Rights Award' from The International Human Rights Association (IHRA) of SAARC Nations
