= State Highway 35 (Karnataka) =

Road in Karnataka, India

State Highway 35

Route information
- Maintained by KPWD and BBMP
- Length: 89 km (55 mi)

Major junctions
- North end: Sidlaghatta, Chikkaballapur
- South end: Anekal, Bangalore

Location
- Country: India
- State: Karnataka
- Districts: Chikkaballapur, Bangalore Rural, Bangalore Urban
- Primary destinations: Hoskote, Kadugodi, Whitefield, Varthur, Sarjapur, Attibele

Highway system
- Roads in India; Expressways; National; State; Asian; State Highways in Karnataka

State Highway 35, commonly referred to as Sidlaghatta-Anekal Highway, is a state highway running from Sidlaghatta (North) to Anekal (South) passing through Hoskote, Kadugodi, Whitefield, Varthur, Gunjur, Sarjapur, Attibele. Part of it is maintained by the Karnataka Public Works Department and a part by Bruhat Bengaluru Mahanagara Palike. Majority of the highway is 2-laned, except for the section between Kadugodi and Varthur-Kodi which is 4 laned.

== Route description ==
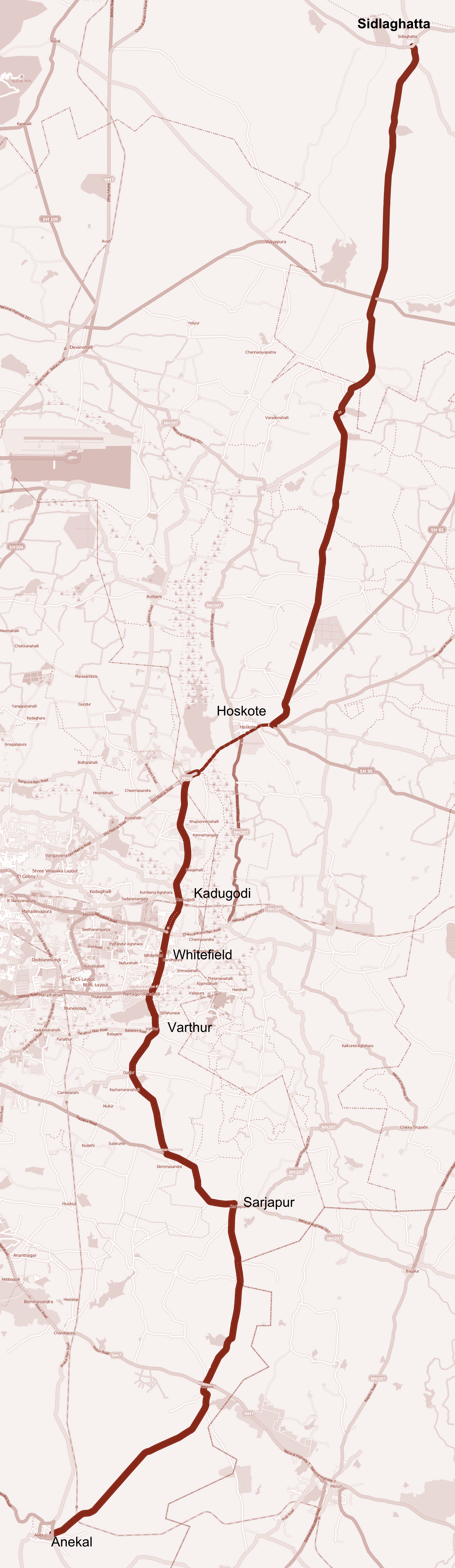
A map showing Karnataka SH 35

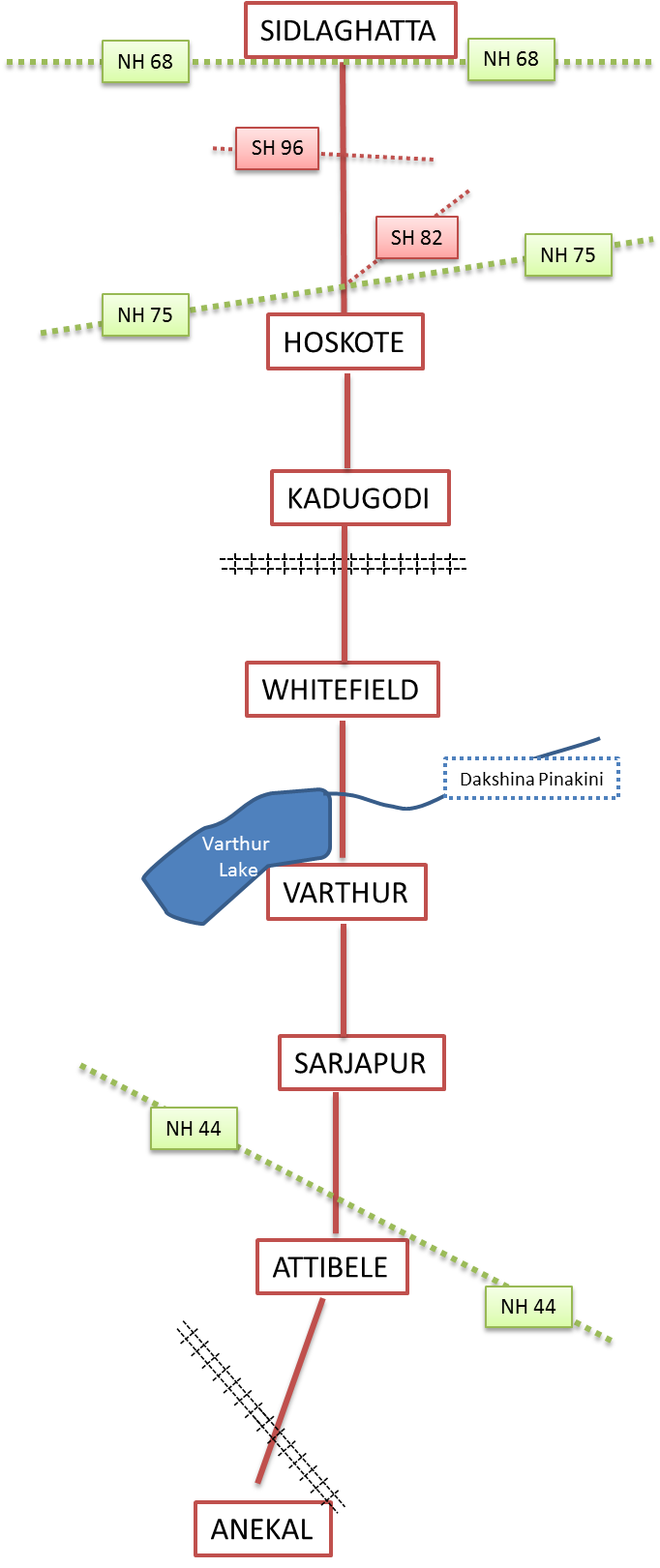
KA SH 35 line map

SH 35 begins at NH 68 (previously NH 234) in Sidlaghatta and goes southwards to intersect with SH 82 and NH 75 (previously NH 4) at Hoskote. Southbound, the highway goes over the Bangalore-Chennai Railway line at Kadugodi, intersects with Whitefield road and Varthur Road in Whitefield. Further south it crosses the Dakshina Pinakini (Ponnaiyar River) at Varthur-Kodi, passes by Varthur Lake and Varthur. It intersects with Sarjapur Road at Dommasandra then goes southbound till Attibele where it intersects with Hosur Road - NH 44 (previously NH 7). From there it goes southwest, to end at Anekal after crossing the Bangalore-Hosur Railway line.

== Major junctions ==
=== National highways ===
- NH 75 (formerly NH 4) at Hoskote
- NH 44 (formerly NH 7) at Attibele

=== State highways ===
- SH 96 at Jangamakote
- SH 82 at Hoskote

== Other information ==
A portion of the highway between Varthur-Kodi and Hope farm will be a part of the signal-free elevated corridor planned between Vellara junction to Hope farm.

== See also ==
- List of state highways in Karnataka
