= AMC Institutions =

Educational Group

Coordinates: 12°49′44″N 77°35′15″E

AMC Group of Institutions are educational institutions in Bangalore, India. The group primarily operate higher education institutions like AMC College of Hotel Management, AMC Engineering College, Advanced Business Management College, AMC PU College, its spin-off branch: AMC College (Jayanagar) and City College of Engineering. The institutions are situated in a combined 55-acre (220,000 m^{2}) campus' with head office and main branch in Bannerghatta Road, Bangalore. It is accredited as a group B- institute by NBA-AICTE in 2017 and is approved for operation by the All India Council for Technical Education (AICTE), New Delhi.

Colloquially, AMC College refers to the engineering college, which is the primary source of income. It has an annual intake of roughly 900 students usually enrolling in the bachelor's program. It was established in the year 1999 under the Paramahamsa Foundation Trust. The engineering campus is spread out in 52 acres of land with two main buildings, the mechanical engineering block and the main building, which is styled after the Vidhan Soudha. Almost all functioning buildings on campus that have been halted mid-construction, with supposed plans for adding new floors later on. The engineering college is affiliated to and operates as a deemed university under the Visvesvaraya Technological University (VTU), Belgaum. According to their website, AMC College offers the following degrees in Bachelor of Engineering, Master of Engineering, Master of Business Administration and Master of Computer Application.
