= Sarjapura =

Sarjapura Sarjapur
- Town
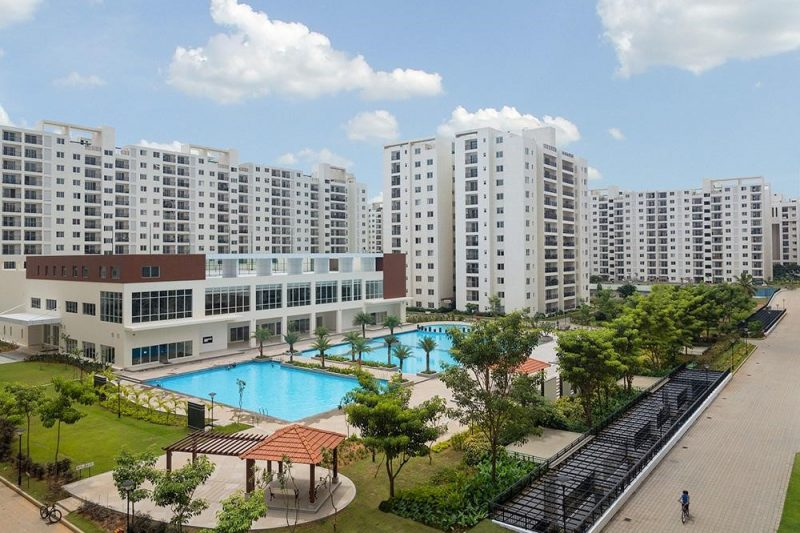
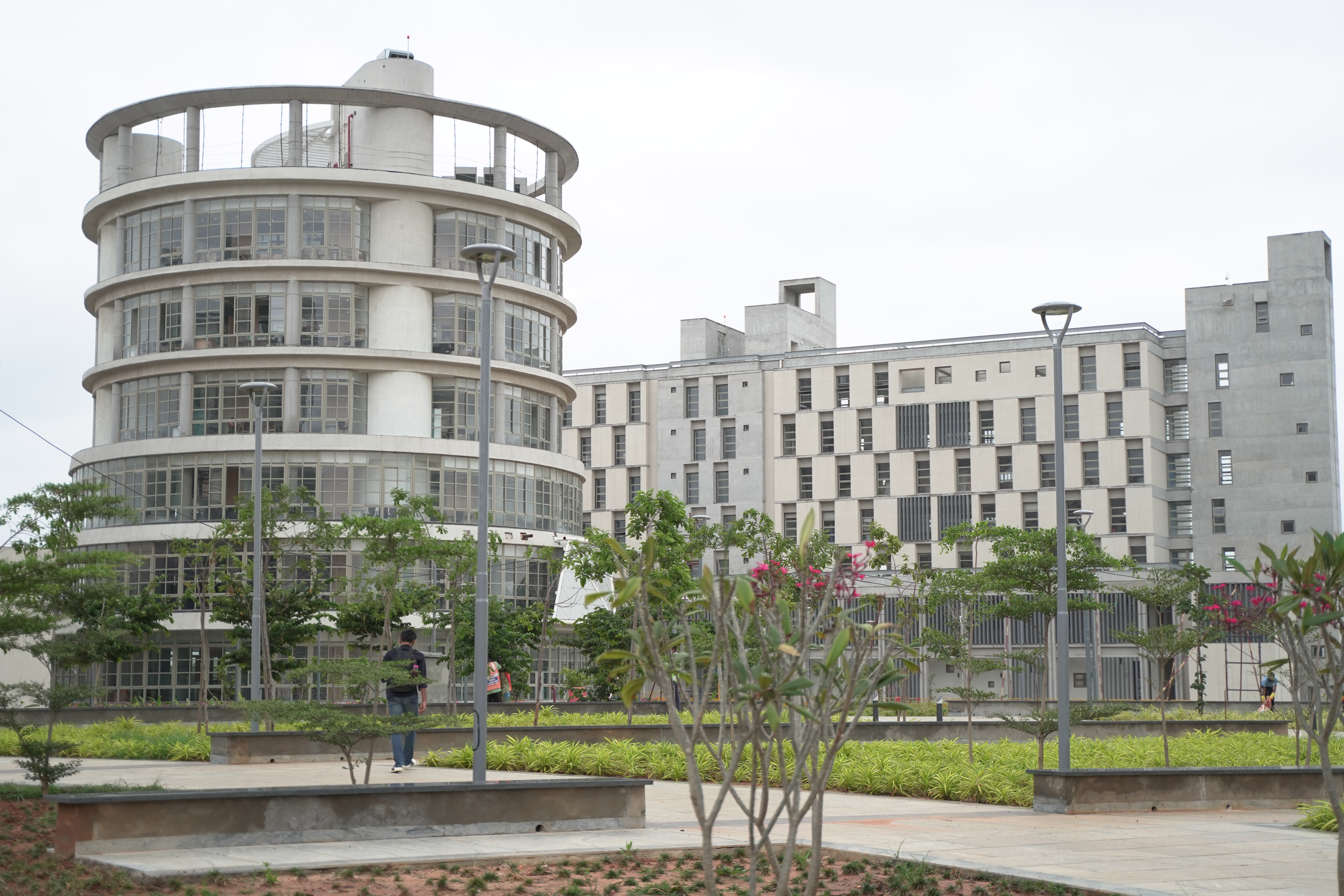
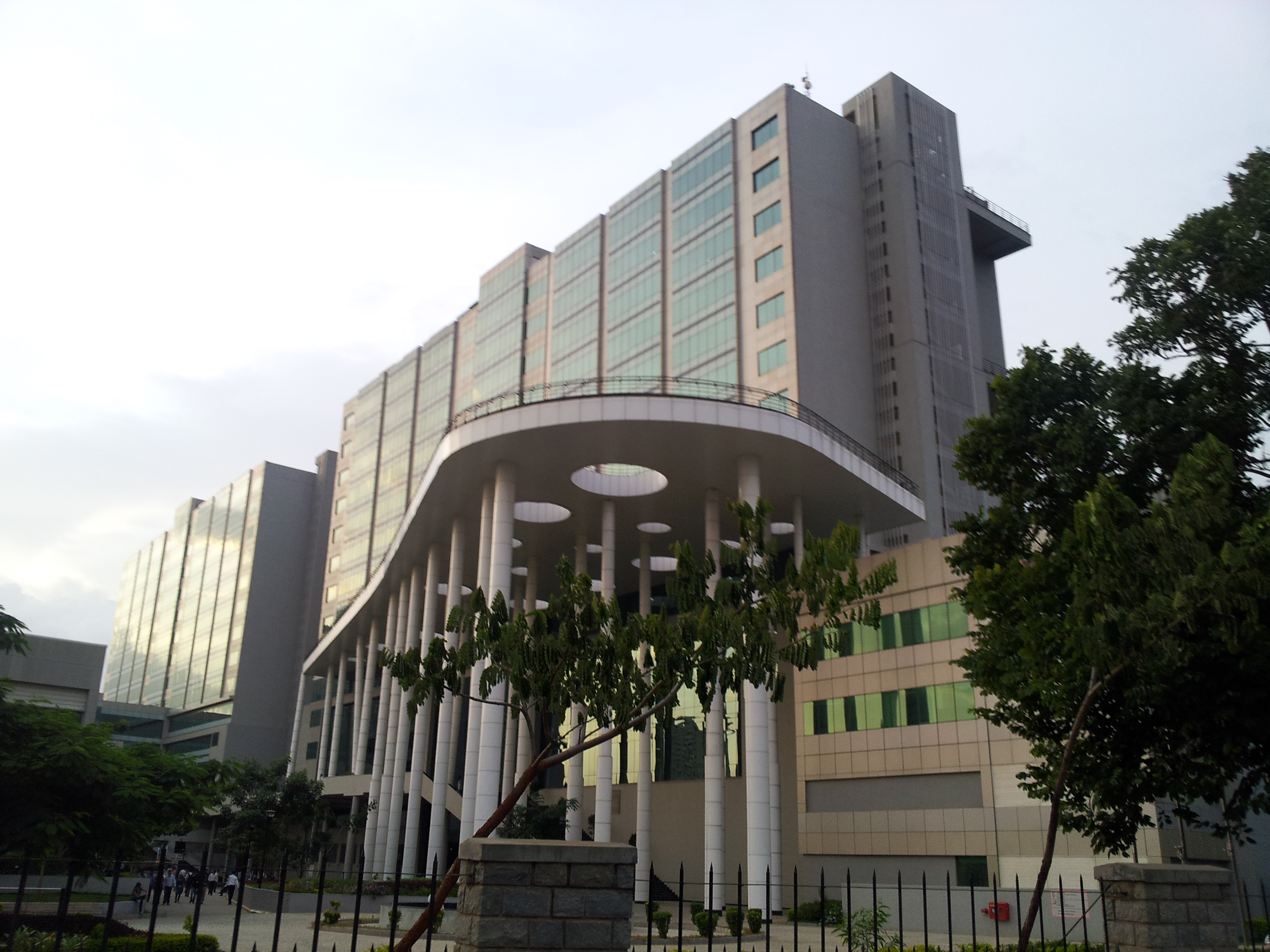
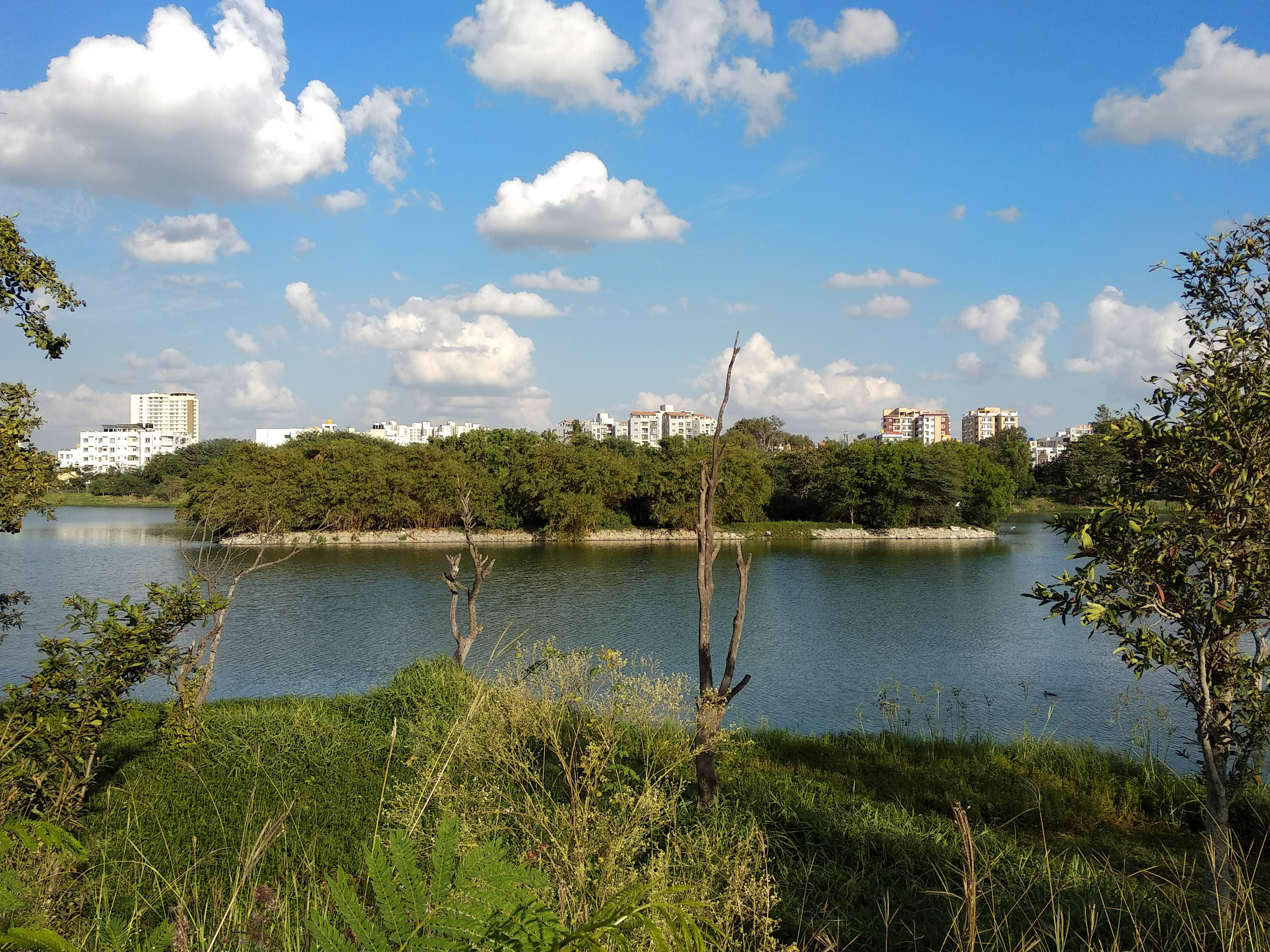
- (From top, L-R) An apartment complex off Sarjapur Road, Azim Premji University campus, Wipro Sarjapur campus, Kaikondrahalli lake on Sarjapur Road

- Location in Karnataka Sarjapura (India)
- Coordinates: 12.860°N 77.786°E
- Country: India
- State: Karnataka
- District: Bengaluru Urban
- Metro: Bengaluru

Languages
  - Official: Kannada
- Time zone: UTC+5:30 (IST)
- Postal Index Number: 562125
- ISO 3166 code: IN-KA
- Vehicle registration: KA
- Website: karnataka.gov.in

Sarjapura (also spelled Sarjapur) is a small town on the outskirts of Bengaluru, Karnataka, India. It is a hobli of Anekal taluk, Bengaluru Urban district, and is located towards the southeast of Bangalore. It is one of the industrial areas in Anekal taluk, with others being Attibele, Bommasandra, Chandapura, Electronic City and Jigani .Sarjapur is one of the fastest growing areas of Bangalore.

== Demographics ==
As of 2001 India census, Sarjapura had a population of 8620, with 4370 males and 4250 females.

As of 2011 Census, Sarjapura had a population of 11,807, of which 5,938 were males and 5,869 were females.

An estimated 16,900 people are living in 2025.
