= Chandapura =

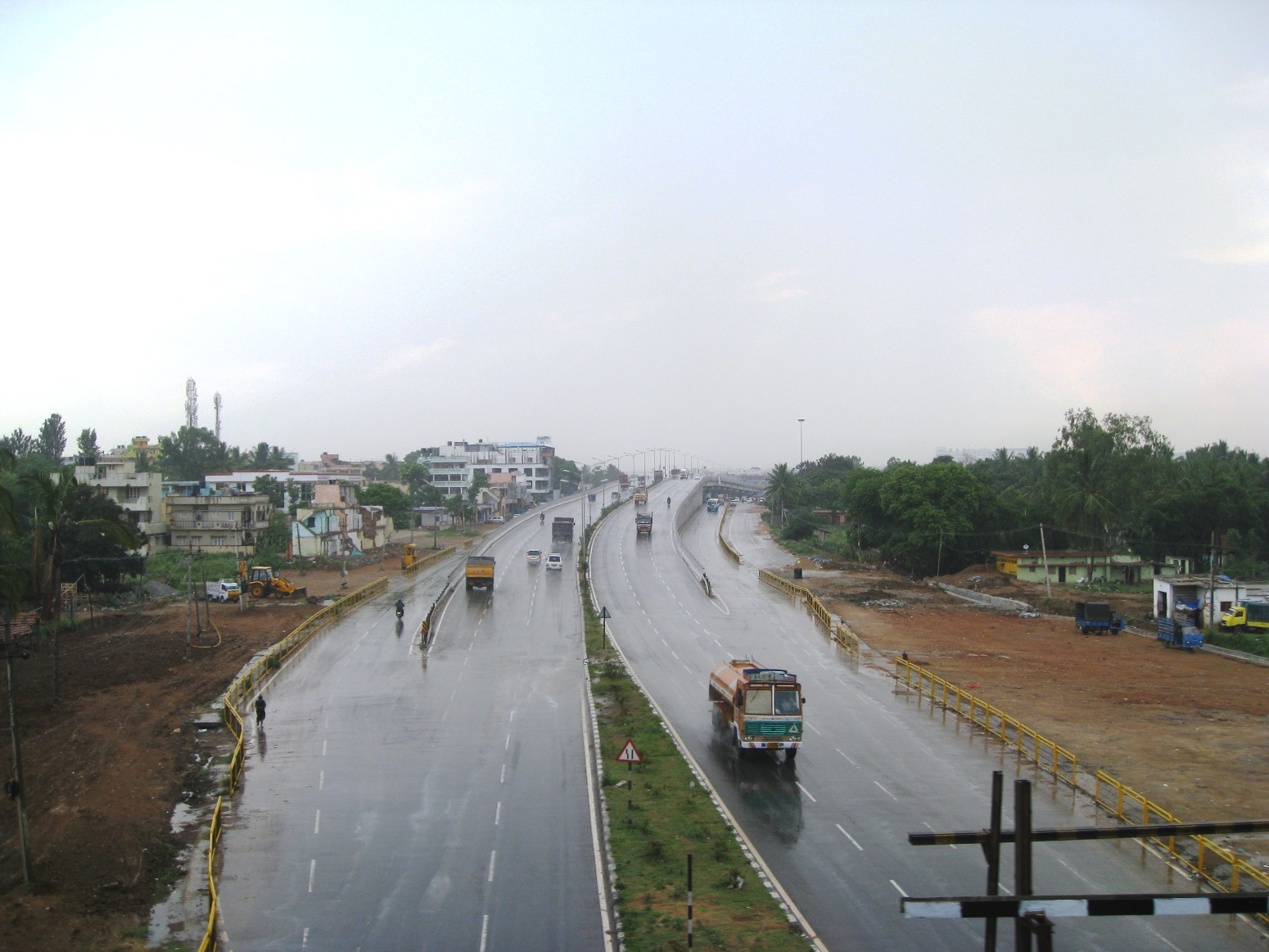
- Chandapura-flyover on Hosur road, NH 44

- Location within Karnataka Location within India
- Coordinates: 12.80009°N 77.71182°E
- Country: India
- State: Karnataka
- District: Bengaluru
- Taluk: Anekal

Languages
  - Official: Kannada
- Time zone: UTC+5:30 (IST)
- PIN: 562107
- Telephone code: 080
- Nearest city: Bengaluru
- Climate: Tropical savannah climate (Köppen)

Chandapura is a Town Municipality Council (TMC) in the Bengaluru urban district of Karnataka state in India. Chandapura is 6 km from Electronics City on NH 44 (widely known as Hosur Road). It has a Saturday market for fresh fruits and vegetables and famous for Saturday traffic jams. Chandapura to get Namma Metro services by 2021, Extending from Bommasandra. Karnataka Housing Board (Surya Nagar Phase 1) is just 200 metres from Chandapura and also Phase 2 & 3 are close by to Chandapura. It is one of the industrial areas in Anekal taluk, with others being Attibele, Bommasandra, Electronic City, Jigani and Sarjapura.

Heelalige (2 km from Chandapura Circle) is a nearby railway station which connects to Bangalore City and Tamil Nadu. Phase II of Bangalore City Metro to be done from 2017 to 2022 has already got the Bommasandra neighbourhood of Chandapura circle included in the rail network.

== Gallery ==
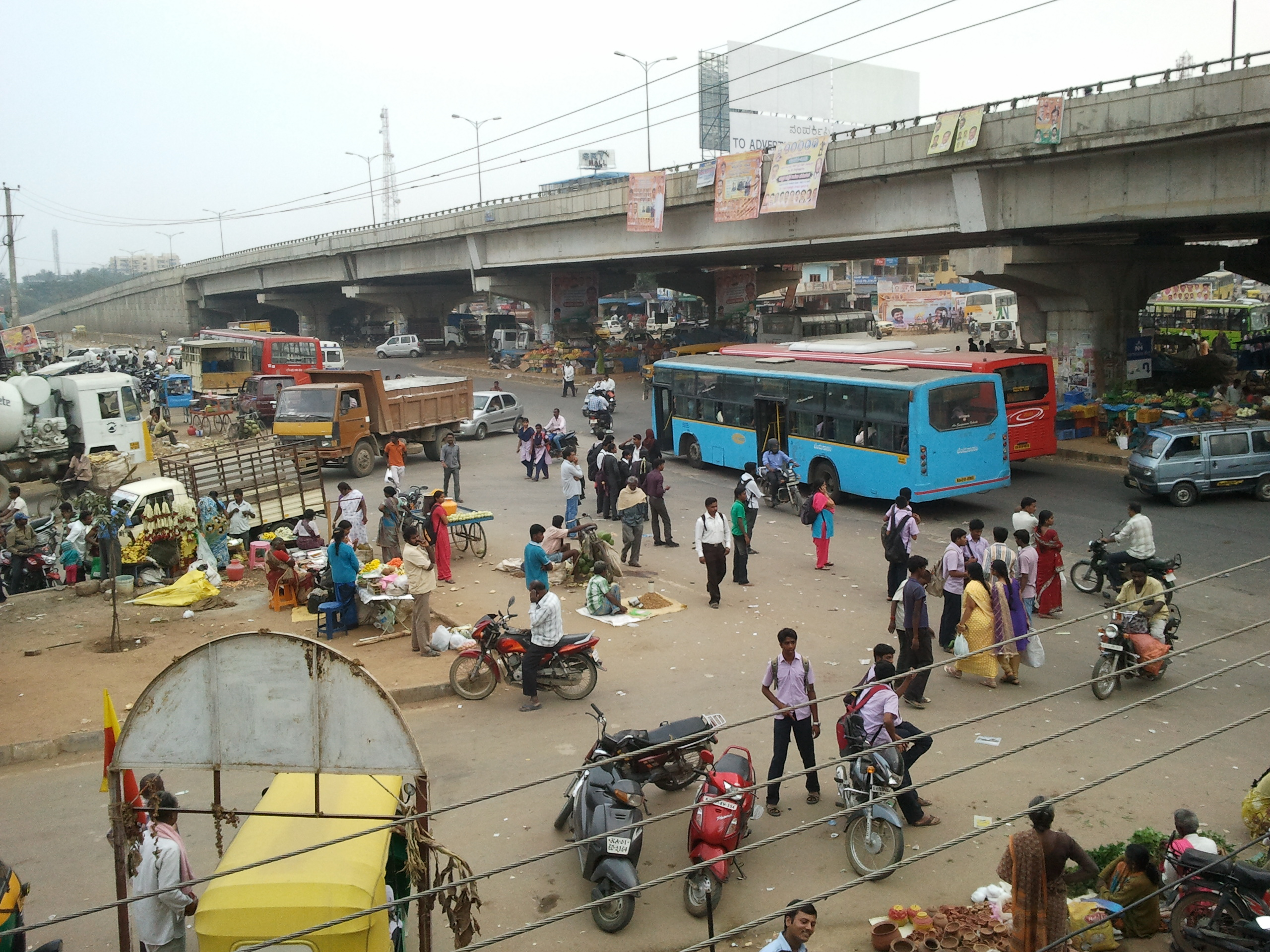
Chandapura Bus stop towards Hosur. The flyover can be seen

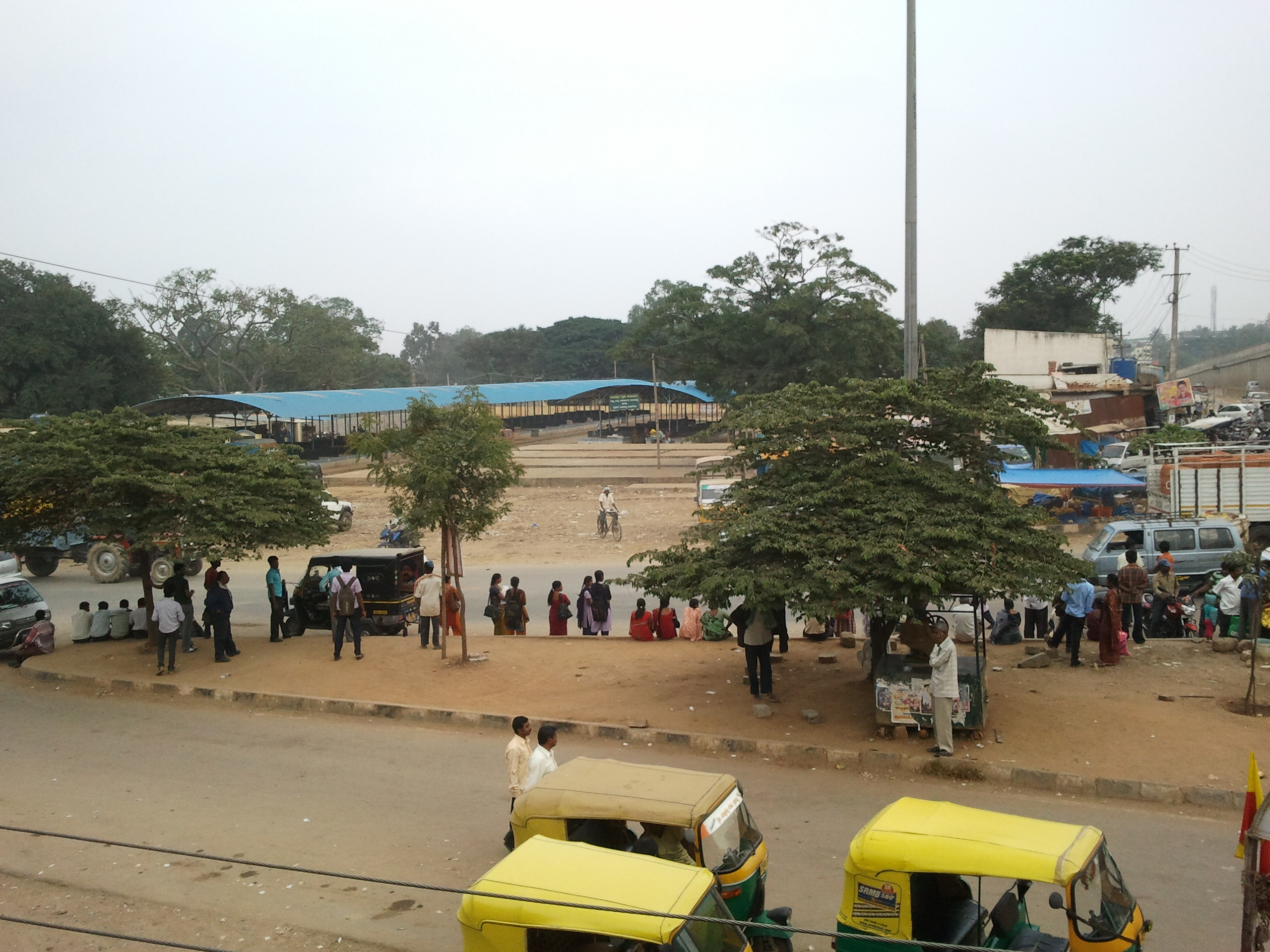
Chandapura Market area on a non-Saturday. The weekly market 'Chandapura Santhe' happens on every Saturday where vegetables, fruits and even cattle are sold.
