= Gottigere =

- Suburb
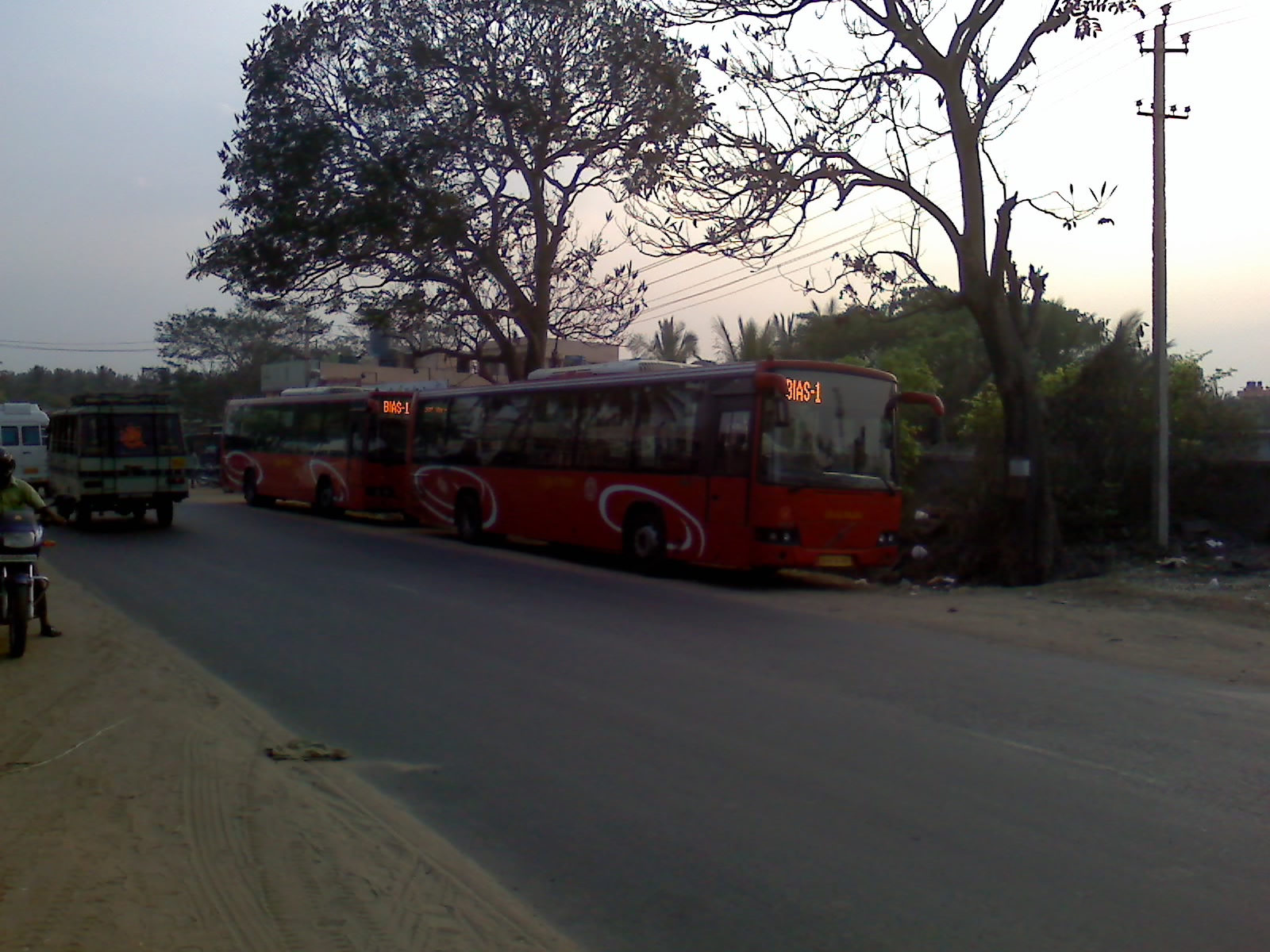
- Volvo buses at Gottigere, Bannerghatta Road

- Location in Bengaluru, India
- Coordinates: 12.85°N 77.59°E
- Bengaluru: India
- State: Karnataka
- District: Bangalore Urban district
- Metro: Bangalore

Population (2001)
  - Total: 11,149

Languages
  - Official: Kannada
- Time zone: UTC+5:30 (IST)
- PIN: 560083
- Vehicle registration: KA-51

Gottigere is a suburb in the southern periphery of Bangalore city, along Bannerghatta Road in the Indian state of Karnataka. It is surrounded by the famous NICE Road and smaller areas like Basavanapura and Kalena Agrahara. It has been named after "Gottigere lake" which is near NICE Road. This area has seen fast growth due to many IT companies establishment near Bannerghatta Road & Electronic city.

== Demographic ==
As of 2001 India census, Gottigere had a population of 11,149. Men constitute 54% of the population and women 46%.

Gottigere has an average literacy rate of 70%, higher than the national average of 59.5%: male literacy is 75%, and female literacy is 63%. In Gottigere, 12% of the population is under 6 years of age.

As of 2007, Gottigere comes with the Bruhat Bangalore Mahanagara Palike (BBMP) Greater Bangalore limits. Other important Places in Gottigere are: Bhora Layout Bramakumari Ashram, Atom Sports Arena, Gottigere Lake walking area

Note: Upcoming new Metro line will start from here: The Pink Line of Namma Metro is under construction and will form part of the metro rail network for the city of Bangalore, Karnataka, India. The 21.25 km (13.20 mi) line connects Kalena Agrahara station (previously named Gottigere) on Bannerghatta road in the south with Nagawara station on Outer Ring road in the north.

== Colleges ==
1. AMC Engineering College
2. T. John College
