= Adugodi =

- neighbourhood
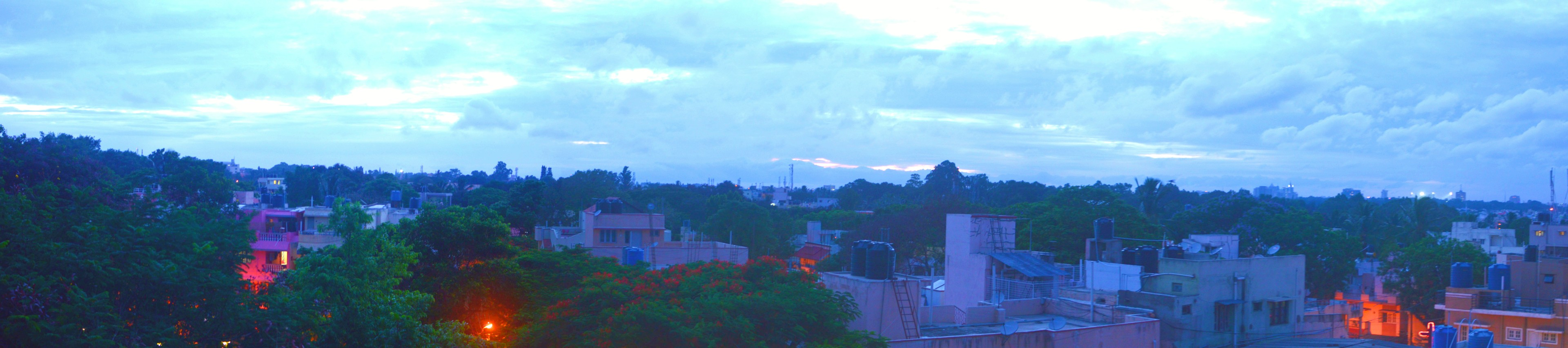

- Location within Bengaluru
- Coordinates: 12.9435°N 77.6091°E
- Country: India
- State: Karnataka
- Metro: Bengaluru

Languages
  - Official: Kannada
- Time zone: UTC+5:30 (IST)
- PIN: 560030
- ISO 3166 code: IN-KA
- Vehicle registration: KA
- Website: karnataka.gov.in

Adugodi is a neighborhood in Central Bangalore, India. It is located along Hosur Road, adjoining Wilson Garden, Richmond Town, Austin Town, Byrasandra, Jayanagara and Koramangala.

The Forum (shopping mall), NIMHANS, Dairy Circle metro station and Shantinagar Bus Station are important landmarks near Adugodi.
