= Jigani =

Jigani (Also Known as 'Granite Hub of Bengaluru')
- Satellite Town
- Nickname: 'The Granite Hub of Bengaluru'
- Jigani within Karnataka
- Coordinates: 12.779154°N 77.643565°E
- Country: India
- State: Karnataka
- District: Bangalore Urban

Area
  - Total: 30 km^{2} (12 sq mi)
- Elevation: 920 m (3,020 ft)

Population (2006)
  - Total: 304,047
  - Rank: 10th
  - Density: 10,000/km^{2} (26,000/sq mi)

Languages
  - Official: Kannada, Telugu, Tamil
- Time zone: UTC+5:30 (IST)
- PIN: 560105
- Telephone code: 91 (0) 80
- Vehicle registration: KA-51

Jigani Hobli is located in Anekal taluk in South Bengaluru, India and is situated at a distance of 28 km from Bangalore city railway station. Some of the features of the place Jigani are that it has a well-established Jigani industrial area and also very near to Electronics City,Bommasandra in Bangalore city. Several Government initiatives to develop this area in Bangalore have led to growth of the population in this area starting from 2004.

Companies like HCL, OTIS, APC, Toyota, BuziBrAIns, The Akshayapatra foundation etc. have brought more people to this remote location.

It is one of the industrial areas in Anekal taluk, with others being Attibele, Bommasandra, Chandapura, Electronic City and Sarjapura.jp

Some prominent lakes here are the Jigani Lake, Hennagara Lake, Haragadde Lake and Konasandra Lake.

During the 14th Century, King Veera Balalla III of the Hoysala Dynasty had established and consecrated the Varadaraja Temple here in Jigani. However, the structure is now left in the form of ruins.

It is known for its upscale and gated communities such as Nisarga Layout, Pride Vatika, Golden Nest Layout and Vakil Townscape. Recently, there have been talks of extending the newly inaugurated Yellow Line to the KIADB Industrial Areas of this region bringing about coordination among the industrial and technological hubs of South Bengaluru.

== IIM-B second campus ==
Indian Institute of Management Bangalore has plans for a second campus in Jigani very soon.

It is also called granite city as a number of granite factories are situated in and around jigani.
