= BGS National Public School, Hulimavu, Bengaluru =

BGS National Public School, Hulimavu

Location
- Bangalore; India; 12.8791°N 77.5993°E

Information
- Established: 22 June 2006
- Principal: Malini M. Dutta
- Website: bgsnps.edu.in

BGS National Public School is a CBSE affiliated school located in the Hulimavu suburb of Bangalore.

== Recognition ==
Education Today ranked BGS National Public School as the top CBSE school in Bangalore and second highest in India, after Kothari International School. The academic director, S. A. Nair, has also received recognition.
