= Bommasandra =

- Census Town
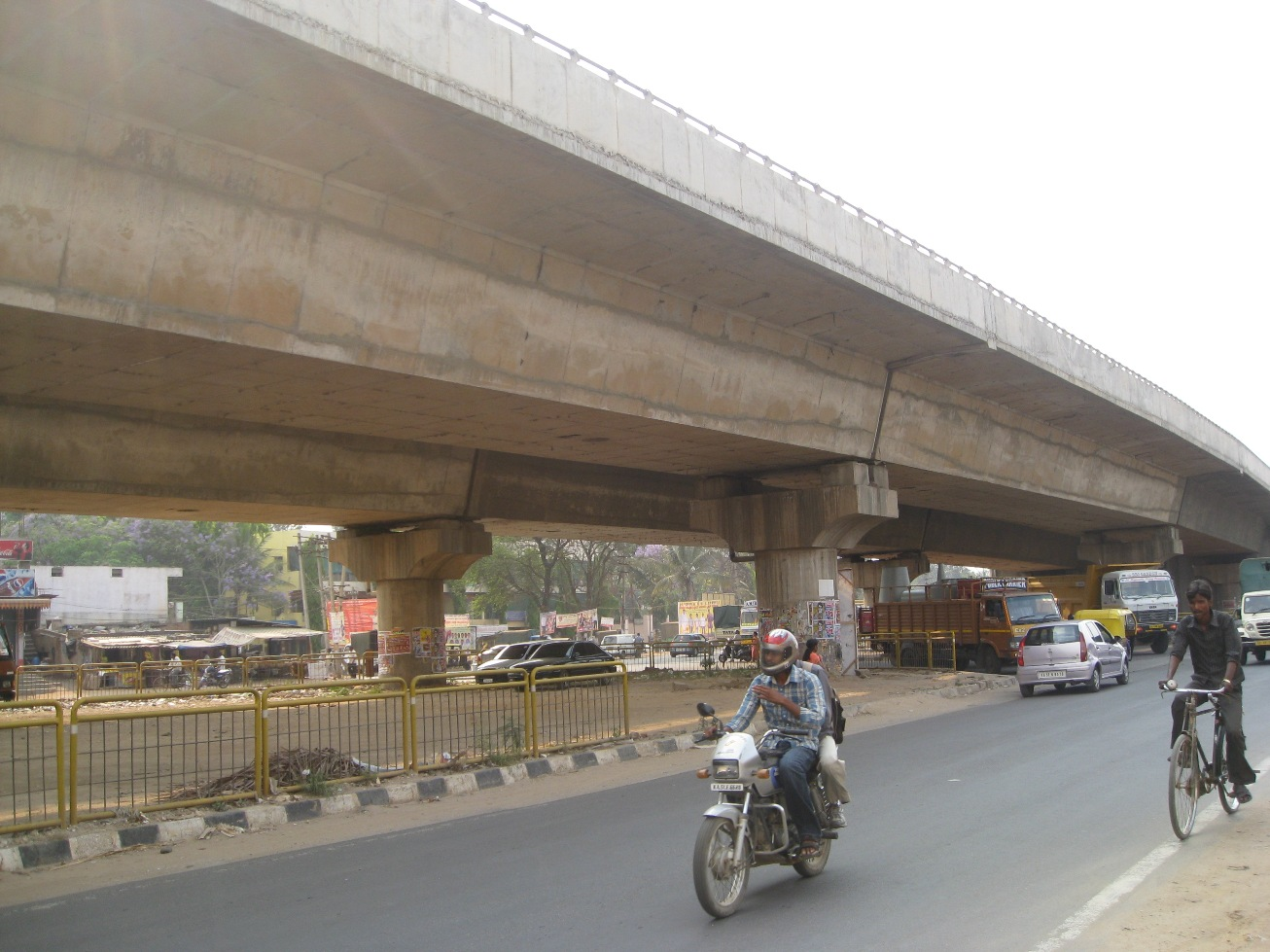
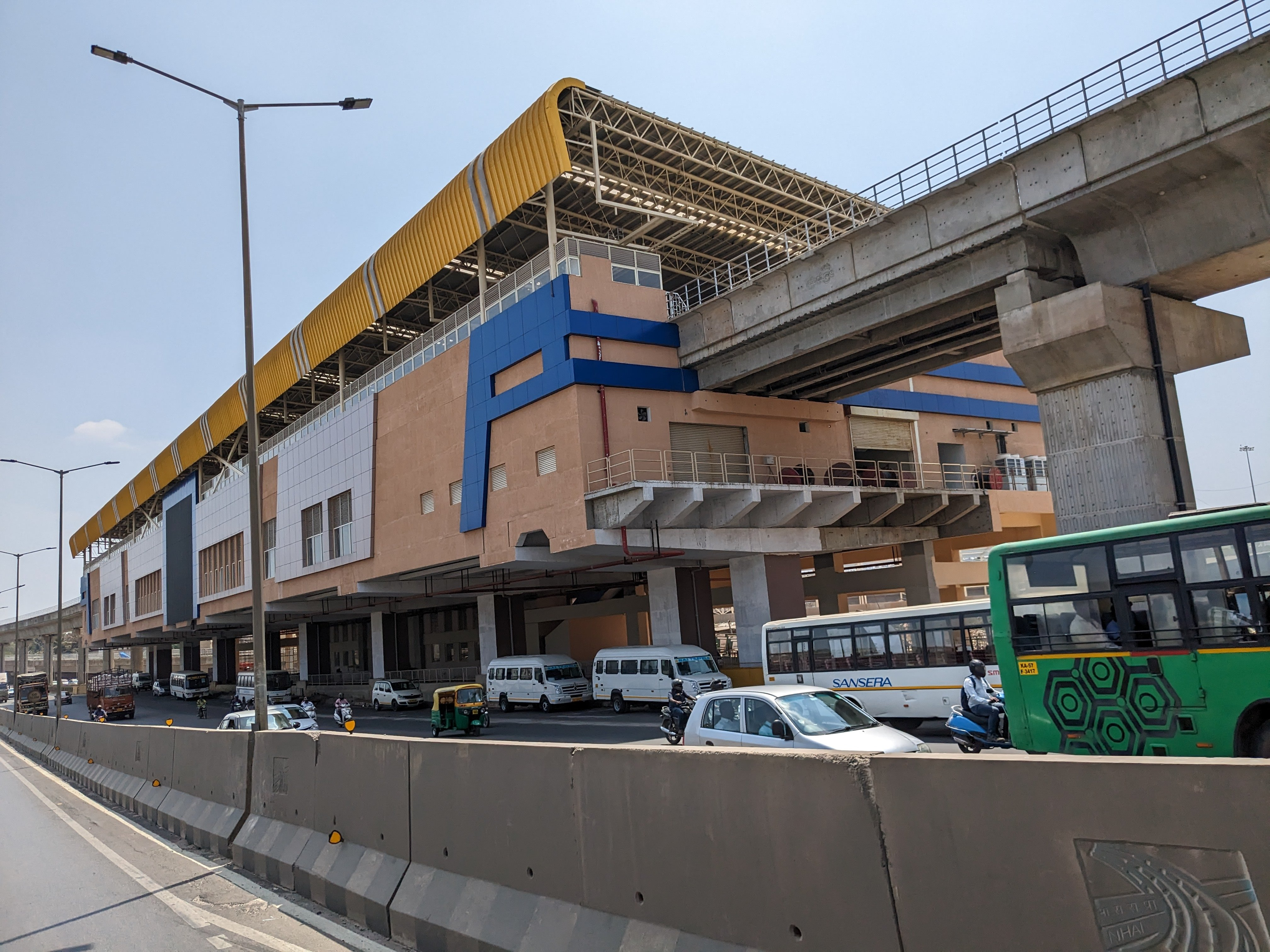
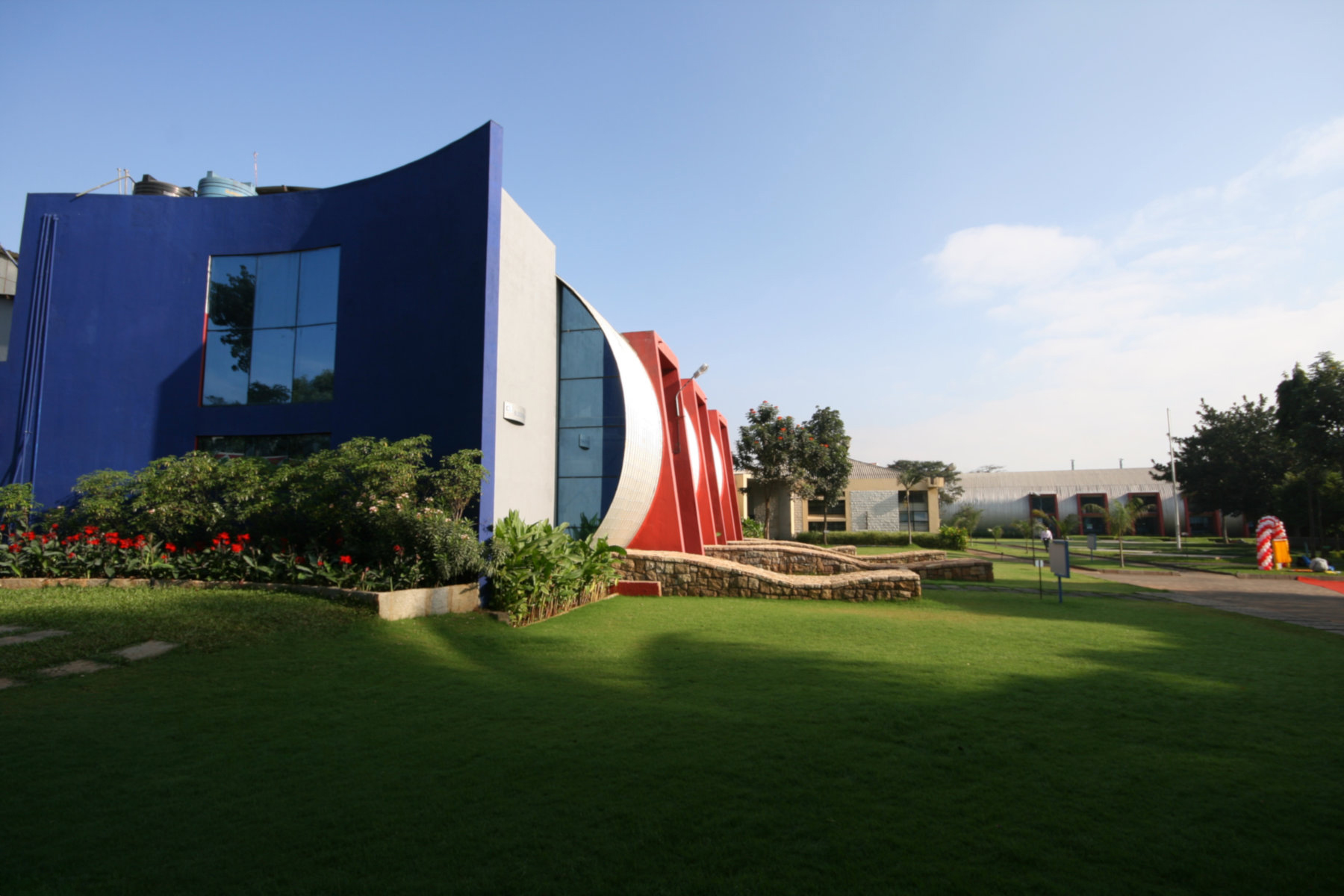
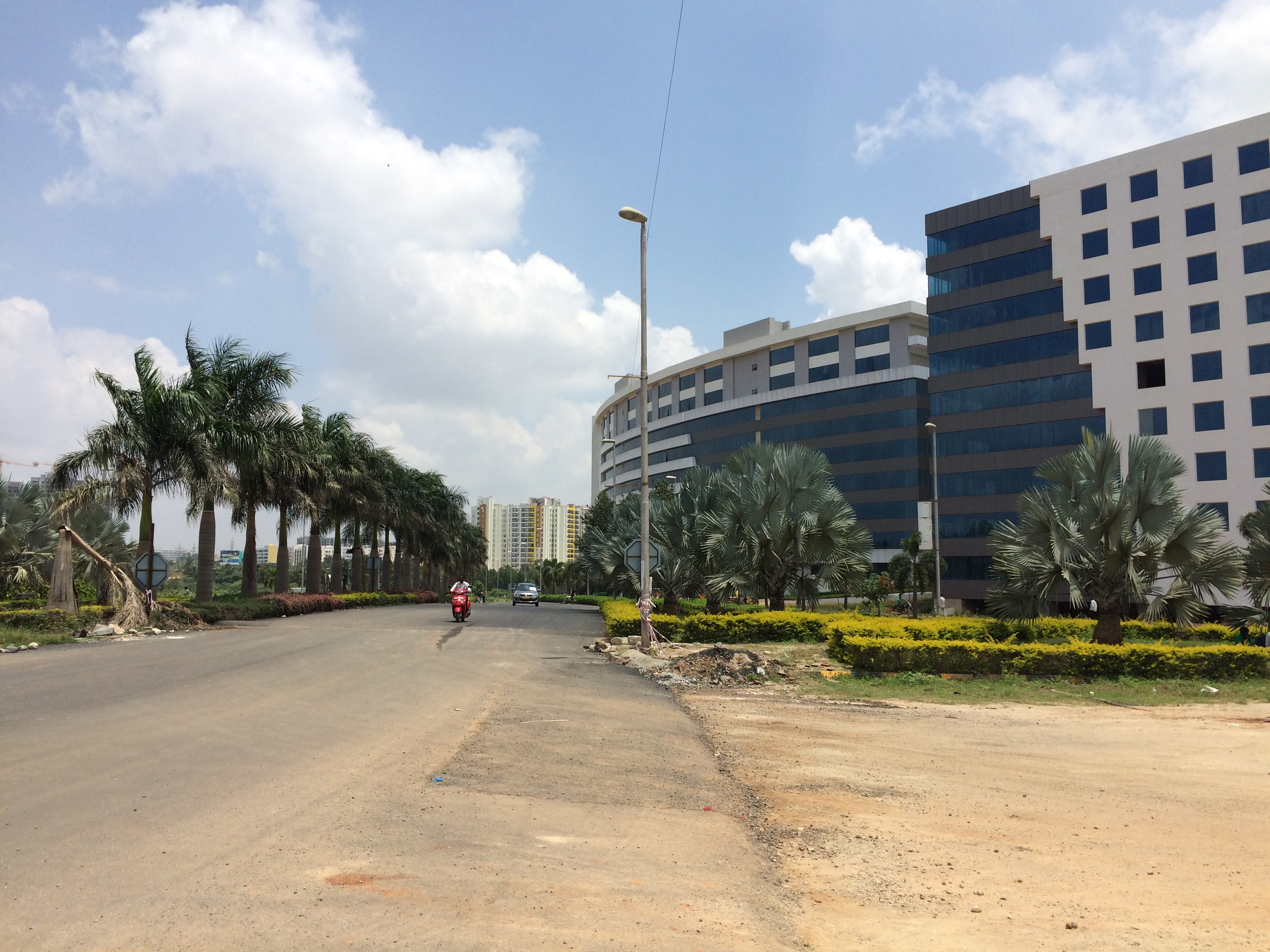
- (From top, L-R) Hebbagodi-Bommasandra flyover, Bommasandra metro station on Hosur Road, Mersen office in Bommasandra Industrial Area, Neotown Road in Thirupalya Bommasandra

- Location within Karnataka Location within India
- Coordinates: 12.82°N 77.69°E
- Country: India
- State: Karnataka
- District: Bangalore

Population (2001)
  - Total: 7,570

Languages
  - Official: Kannada
- Time zone: UTC+5:30 (IST)
- PIN: 560099
- Telephone code: 91-80
- Vehicle registration: KA 51

Bommasandra is a census town located in Bangalore Urban district in the state of Karnataka, India.

== Demographics ==
As of 2001 India census, Bommasandra had a population of 7 570. Males constitute 58% of the population and females 42%. Bommasandra has an average literacy rate of 72%, higher than the national average of 59.5%, with male literacy of 80% and female literacy of 61%. 15% of the population is under 6 years of age.
