= Attibele =

- Suburban of Bengaluru
- Location Bengaluru
- Coordinates: 12.776800°N 77.768870°E
- Country: India
- State: Karnataka
- District: Bengaluru Urban
- Metro: Bengaluru

Government
  - Type: Urban local body
  - Body: Town municipal council

Area
  - Total: 4.34 km^{2} (1.68 sq mi)

Population (2011)
  - Total: 20,532
  - Density: 4,730/km^{2} (12,300/sq mi)

Languages
  - Official: Kannada
- Time zone: UTC+5:30 (IST)
- PIN: 562107
- Telephone code: +91-80
- Vehicle registration: KA-51, KA-59
- Nearest town: Anekal, Hosur and Bengaluru
- Lok Sabha constituency: Bengaluru rural
- Vidhan Sabha constituency: Anekal
- Website: http://www.attibeletown.mrc.gov.in

Attibele is Town Municipality Council (TMC) in Anekal, Karnataka, India. The Karnataka check post border is situated here, which is marked by an arch. It is 32 km from Bengaluru on NH44.
