= List of wards in Bangalore (1995–2006) =

In 1995, the then Bangalore Mahanagara Palike (BMP) expanded to include 100 wards. Here is the list of wards.

Ward No.	Ward Name	Zone	Sub-Division	Assembly Constituency	Lok Sabha Constituency	No of HHs (1991)	Area				Total Population (2001)			SC Population (2001)			ST Population (2001)			Alternate Name
Ward No.	Ward Name	Zone	Sub-Division	Assembly Constituency	Lok Sabha Constituency	No of HHs (1991)	In m^{2}	In ha	In km^{2}	In Acres	Persons	Male	Female	Persons	Male	Female	Persons	Male	Female	Alternate Name
1	HMT	West	Yeshwanthpura	Rajarajeshwarinagar	Bangalore Rural	6551	6619113.24	661.91	6.62	1635.62	27637	14558	13079	6146	3148	2998	935	498	437	HMT Colony
2	Jalahalli	West	Yeshwanthpura	Rajarajeshwarinagar	Bangalore Rural	8293	3161428.28	316.14	3.16	781.21	36125	19005	17120	5153	2660	2493	1110	571	539	
3	Yeshwanthpura	West	Yeshwanthpura	Rajarajeshwarinagar	Bangalore Rural	10585	1314117.84	131.41	1.31	324.73	46677	24503	22174	4119	2140	1979	675	351	324	Yesvanthpur
4	Mathikere	West	Sanjayanagar	Malleshwaram	Bangalore North	12946	2139997.60	214.00	2.14	528.80	54704	29258	25446	4541	2346	2195	997	517	480	Mattikere
5	Kodandaramapura	West	Malleshwaram	Malleshwaram	Bangalore North	8558	3304559.68	330.46	3.30	816.57	36287	18493	17794	2088	1083	1005	313	159	154	Kodandarama Nagar
6	Dattatreya Temple	West	Malleshwaram	Gandhi Nagar	Bangalore Central	8813	1212941.04	121.29	1.21	299.72	38723	19985	18738	4714	2393	2321	261	141	120	
7	Malleshwaram	West	Malleshwaram	Malleshwaram	Bangalore North	9029	1825416.84	182.54	1.83	451.07	37760	19141	18619	4186	2147	2039	274	146	128	Kadu Malleshwara / Subedarpalya
8	Gayathrinagar	West	Gayathrinagar	Malleshwaram	Bangalore North	9688	587519.32	58.75	0.59	145.18	40673	21082	19591	1056	573	483	249	125	124	
9	Subrahmanyanagar	West	Mahalakshmipura	Malleshwaram	Bangalore North	9521	833267.12	83.33	0.83	205.90	38905	19938	18967	1081	544	537	326	174	152	
10	Mahalakshmipura	West	Mahalakshmipura	Mahalakshmi Layout	Bangalore North	7955	1833133.68	183.31	1.83	452.98	34702	18344	16358	5163	2678	2485	341	176	165	Mahalakshmi Layout
11	Peenya Industrial Town	West	Mahalakshmipura	Rajarajeshwarinagar	Bangalore Rural	8497	3535177.08	353.52	3.54	873.56	35403	19181	16222	4554	2316	2238	1137	604	533	
12	Nandini Layout	West	Mahalakshmipura	Mahalakshmi Layout	Bangalore North	10645	2139623.04	213.96	2.14	528.71	43445	23048	20397	4814	2491	2323	655	339	316	
13	Geleyarabalaga	West	Gayathrinagar	Mahalakshmi Layout	Bangalore North	9265	1643825.80	164.38	1.64	406.20	38743	20594	18149	1022	531	491	309	169	140	Geleyara Balaga Layout
14	Nagapura	West	Gayathrinagar	Mahalakshmi Layout	Bangalore North	8452	1826305.20	182.63	1.83	451.29	36918	19068	17850	2622	1326	1296	353	178	175	
15	Rajajinagar	West	Rajajinagar	Rajaji Nagar	Bangalore Central	8459	1238591.88	123.86	1.24	306.06	37005	19225	17780	2234	1145	1089	269	138	131	
16	Kamalanagar	West	Rajajinagar	Mahalakshmi Layout	Bangalore North	14339	1425361.52	142.54	1.43	352.21	61314	32043	29271	7301	3811	3490	625	325	300	Kamala Nagar
17	Vrishabhavathinagar	West	Srirama Mandir	Mahalakshmi Layout	Bangalore North	7018	736821.40	73.68	0.74	182.07	29275	16003	13272	546	302	244	279	144	135	Vrushabhavathi Valley
18	Kamakshipalya	West	Srirama Mandir	Rajaji Nagar	Bangalore Central	5843	514366.04	51.44	0.51	127.10	25742	13638	12104	2004	1020	984	321	182	139	
19	Basaveshwaranagar	West	Rajajinagar	Rajaji Nagar	Bangalore Central	5250	815070.12	81.51	0.82	201.41	23228	12200	11028	1207	637	570	206	112	94	
20	Shivanagara	West	Rajajinagar	Rajaji Nagar	Bangalore Central	6709	406254.36	40.63	0.41	100.39	28121	14961	13160	680	329	351	229	127	102	
21	Rajajinagar Industrial Town	West	Srirama Mandir	Govindraj Nagar	Bangalore South	11085	1826389.40	182.64	1.83	451.31	47682	25035	22647	5061	2613	2448	730	387	343	Industrial Town Rajaji Nagar
22	Srirama Mandir	West	Srirama Mandir	Rajaji Nagar	Bangalore Central	9253	1253354.76	125.34	1.25	309.71	41471	21327	20144	1087	559	528	327	169	158	Shree Ramamandira
23	Prakashnagar	West	Gayathrinagar	Rajaji Nagar	Bangalore Central	8181	631118.24	63.11	0.63	155.95	35465	18641	16824	1994	1047	947	140	67	73	
24	Bhashyamnagar	West	Gandhinagar	Rajaji Nagar	Bangalore Central	7209	587519.32	58.75	0.59	145.18	34595	17767	16828	10651	5463	5188	170	91	79	
25	Ramachandrapura	West	Gandhinagar	Gandhi Nagar	Bangalore Central	7424	863329.20	86.33	0.86	213.33	35411	18424	16987	4343	2236	2107	272	132	140	Kuvempunagar
26	Sevashrama	West	Gandhinagar	Gandhi Nagar	Bangalore Central	7663	869691.28	86.97	0.87	214.91	37507	19194	18313	12398	6307	6091	516	260	256	
27	Gandhinagar	West	Gandhinagar	Gandhi Nagar	Bangalore Central	6403	2079913.80	207.99	2.08	513.96	32809	18236	14573	6296	3337	2959	158	96	62	
28	Chikkapete	West	Chikkapete	Gandhi Nagar	Bangalore Central	5842	982662.40	98.27	0.98	242.82	31851	16706	15145	219	116	103	89	52	37	Chickpet
29	Cottonpet	West	Chikkapete	Gandhi Nagar	Bangalore Central	8357	604063.55	60.41	0.60	149.27	40704	21236	19468	2765	1374	1391	305	154	151	
30	Sir Krishnarajendra Market	West	Chikkapete	Chamrajpet	Bangalore Central	7626	990574.68	99.06	0.99	244.78	39521	20718	18803	17616	9206	8410	344	173	171	KR Market
31	Binnipet	South	Binnipet	Gandhi Nagar	Bangalore Central	6040	314354.76	31.44	0.31	77.68	28069	14362	13707	2466	1265	1201	622	302	320	Binnypete
32	Kempapura Agrahara	South	Binnipet	Vijay Nagar	Bangalore South	9048	351690.12	35.17	0.35	86.90	40047	20592	19455	1354	703	651	1078	542	536	
33	Vijayanagar	South	Binnipet	Vijay Nagar	Bangalore South	9170	1087835.24	108.78	1.09	268.81	40867	21548	19319	1534	832	702	282	152	130	Vijaynagar
34	R P C Layout	South	Binnipet	Vijay Nagar	Bangalore South	9997	1153908.36	115.39	1.15	285.14	44368	22985	21383	4668	2457	2211	460	242	218	
35	Marenahalli	South	Govindarajanagar	Govindraj Nagar	Bangalore South	9535	1284140.28	128.41	1.28	317.32	40131	20971	19160	1759	909	850	669	351	318	
36	Govindarajanagar	South	Govindarajanagar	Govindraj Nagar	Bangalore South	13351	1394609.92	139.46	1.39	344.62	56340	30323	26017	3216	1694	1522	689	362	327	
37	Amarajyothinagar	South	Govindarajanagar	Govindraj Nagar	Bangalore South	5205	1673706.36	167.37	1.67	413.58	21896	11501	10395	647	335	312	464	257	207	
38	Moodalapalya	South	Govindarajanagar	Govindraj Nagar	Bangalore South	3683	1434996.76	143.50	1.43	354.60	15597	8183	7416	890	450	440	237	112	125	
39	Chandra Layout	South	Nagarabhavi	Govindraj Nagar	Bangalore South	9019	2241581.12	224.16	2.24	553.91	40478	21041	19437	4397	2270	2127	484	254	230	
40	Attiguppe	South	Nagarabhavi	Vijay Nagar	Bangalore South	5865	1703502.24	170.35	1.70	420.94	25619	13377	12242	1288	655	633	231	120	111	
41	Gali Anjaneyaswamy Temple	South	Nagarabhavi	Vijay Nagar	Bangalore South	12150	2691921.80	269.19	2.69	665.19	51746	27739	24007	2790	1486	1304	512	277	235	Ghali Anjaneya Temple
42	Bapujinagar	South	Jagajeeevanaram Nagar	Vijay Nagar	Bangalore South	8830	973319.36	97.33	0.97	240.51	43223	22613	20610	3314	1704	1610	481	241	240	
43	Padarayanapura	South	Jagajeeevanaram Nagar	Chamrajpet	Bangalore Central	11015	812863.24	81.29	0.81	200.86	59933	31252	28681	4108	2119	1989	447	227	220	
44	Jagajeeevanaram Nagar	South	Jagajeeevanaram Nagar	Chamrajpet	Bangalore Central	7888	603707.96	60.37	0.60	149.18	43892	22636	21256	12594	6420	6174	281	143	138	
45	Azadnagar	South	Jagajeeevanaram Nagar	Chamrajpet	Bangalore Central	8675	787747.32	78.77	0.79	194.66	40821	21223	19598	2630	1383	1247	825	427	398	
46	Chamarajapet	West	Chamarajapet	Chamrajpet	Bangalore Central	8259	1650401.92	165.04	1.65	407.82	40725	20980	19745	4151	2146	2005	483	266	217	
47	Dharamarayaswamy Temple	West	Chamarajapet	Chickpet	Bangalore South	6118	1143307.36	114.33	1.14	282.52	32938	18023	14915	2036	1049	987	108	61	47	Kalasipalya
48	Sudhamanagar	West	Chamarajapet	Chickpet	Bangalore South	8045	1497604.40	149.76	1.50	370.07	42919	22098	20821	10099	5134	4965	346	152	194	
49	Kempegowdanagar	South	Basavanagudi	Chickpet	Bangalore South	9477	1549611.08	154.96	1.55	382.92	41075	21167	19908	2162	1096	1066	352	178	174	Sunkenahalli
50	Vishveshwarapuram	South	Basavanagudi	Chickpet	Bangalore South	6536	1729933.80	172.99	1.73	427.48	31893	16021	15872	1676	827	849	78	39	39	
51	Basavanagudi	South	Basavanagudi	Basavanagudi	Bangalore South	9700	1544594.48	154.46	1.54	381.68	39484	23235	19249	1002	506	496	216	108	108	
52	Hanumanthanagar	South	Hanumanthanagar	Basavanagudi	Bangalore South	8474	491874.44	49.19	0.49	121.54	35660	18499	17161	903	472	431	296	155	141	Gavipuram
53	Srinagar	South	Hanumanthanagar	Basavanagudi	Bangalore South	14887	1201970.24	120.20	1.20	297.01	62163	32439	29724	654	343	311	272	144	128	
54	Srinivasnagar	South	Hanumanthanagar	Basavanagudi	Bangalore South	19842	2285820.00	228.58	2.29	564.84	82630	43207	39423	2725	1403	1322	640	339	301	
55	Padmanabhanagar	South	Padmanabhanagar	Padmanabhanagar	Bangalore South	26810	7023505.28	702.35	7.02	1735.55	112407	58778	53629	5371	2748	2623	1041	556	485	
56	Ganeshamandira	South	Padmanabhanagar	Padmanabhanagar	Bangalore South	19019	2105411.76	210.54	2.11	520.26	87307	45082	42225	5438	2823	2615	1084	572	512	
57	J P Nagar	South	Jayanagar	Jayanagar	Bangalore South	14941	4404574.56	440.46	4.40	1088.39	63906	33148	30758	4153	2067	2086	750	383	367	Jayaprakash Nagar
58	Jayanagar	South	Jayanagar	Jayanagar	Bangalore South	9312	2225383.60	222.54	2.23	549.90	40430	20408	20022	2103	1049	1054	198	109	89	
59	Yadiyuru	South	Jayanagar	Padmanabhanagar	Bangalore South	7931	1469852.36	146.99	1.47	363.21	34613	17659	16954	1448	656	792	134	76	58	Yediyur
60	Pattabhiramanagar	South	Jayanagar	Jayanagar	Bangalore South	8280	1411176.36	141.12	1.41	348.71	39308	20208	19100	4194	2145	2049	119	66	53	
61	Mavalli	South	Hombegowdanagar	Chickpet	Bangalore South	8024	1177050.20	117.71	1.18	290.86	39505	20421	19084	4037	2063	1974	191	97	94	
62	Homegowdanagar	South	Hombegowdanagar	Chickpet	Bangalore South	11115	2571712.24	257.17	2.57	635.48	53934	27619	26315	6312	3205	3107	394	209	185	
63	Lakkasandra	South	Hombegowdanagar	B.T.M Layout	Bangalore South	10630	2110392.20	211.04	2.11	521.49	48979	25993	22986	6610	3411	3199	669	341	328	
64	Gurappanapalya	South	Madiwala	Jayanagar	Bangalore South	12613	2363518.12	236.35	2.36	584.04	63111	32900	30211	5497	2805	2692	252	124	128	
65	B T M Layout	South	Madiwala	B.T.M Layout	Bangalore South	12244	4117307.24	411.73	4.12	1017.41	51545	27644	23901	3195	1637	1558	383	209	174	
66	Madiwala	South	Madiwala	B.T.M Layout	Bangalore South	15375	3541231.20	354.12	3.54	875.06	65820	35753	30067	6499	3439	3060	1107	591	516	
67	Koramangala	East	Koramangala	B.T.M Layout	Bangalore South	10244	4317552.64	431.76	4.32	1066.89	45929	24026	21903	6816	3456	3360	542	286	256	
68	Ejipura	East	Koramangala	B.T.M Layout	Bangalore South	9710	3590095.44	359.01	3.59	887.13	40986	21438	19548	5487	2832	2655	520	263	257	
69	Neelasandra	East	Koramangala	Shanthinagar	Bangalore Central	10761	1115312.68	111.53	1.12	275.60	52079	26929	25150	6678	3372	3306	2161	1105	1056	
70	Shanthinagar	East	Shanthinagar	Shanthinagar	Bangalore Central	7337	2262697.92	226.27	2.26	559.12	34682	17762	16920	4126	2013	2113	668	342	326	
71	Austin Town	East	Shanthinagar	Shanthinagar	Bangalore Central	7737	1035205.64	103.52	1.04	255.80	39790	22081	17707	15542	7718	7824	390	240	150	
72	Domlur	East	Jeevanabima Nagar	Shanthinagar	Bangalore Central	10413	3361740.56	336.17	3.36	830.70	44357	22912	21445	6333	3173	3160	385	195	190	
73	HAL Airport	East	Jeevanabima Nagar	C. V. Raman Nagar	Bangalore Central	10057	6943971.24	694.40	6.94	1715.89	42288	22154	20134	8351	4253	4098	239	124	115	Airport
74	Jeevanabima Nagar	East	Jeevanabima Nagar	C. V. Raman Nagar	Bangalore Central	9565	1314021.64	131.40	1.31	324.70	39820	20916	18904	5431	2785	2646	289	145	144	
75	Jogupalya	East	Jeevanabima Nagar	Shanthinagar	Bangalore Central	8262	2240001.56	224.00	2.24	553.52	36035	18367	17668	6194	3065	3129	611	293	318	
76	Richmond Town	East	Shanthinagar	Shanthinagar	Bangalore Central	7576	3960681.56	396.07	3.96	978.71	36465	18780	17685	4975	2563	2412	126	61	65	
77	Sampangiramanagar	East	Shivajinagar	Shivajinagar	Bangalore Central	6763	4514229.92	451.42	4.51	1115.49	32451	17033	15418	1372	704	668	296	160	136	
78	Vasanthanagar	East	Shivajinagar	Shivajinagar	Bangalore Central	7270	2324341.72	232.43	2.32	574.36	37028	18511	18517	4639	2338	2301	750	351	399	
79	Shivajinagar	East	Shivajinagar	Shivajinagar	Bangalore Central	6101	1413375.28	141.34	1.41	349.25	34988	18129	16859	1420	710	710	513	273	240	
80	Bharathinagar	East	Bharathinagar	Shivajinagar	Bangalore Central	6622	740027.64	74.00	0.74	182.86	35681	18042	17639	2189	1074	1115	186	98	88	
81	Halasuru	East	Bharathinagar	Shivajinagar	Bangalore Central	7979	2304261.92	230.43	2.30	569.40	39669	22426	17243	6638	3360	3278	871	451	420	Ulsoor
82	Hoysalanagar	East	Bharathinagar	C. V. Raman Nagar	Bangalore Central	7255	1866556.64	186.66	1.87	461.24	33359	16759	16600	10497	5177	5320	210	105	105	
83	C. V. Raman Nagar	East	Banaswadi	C. V. Raman Nagar	Bangalore Central	12453	5968871.60	596.89	5.97	1474.94	50256	26746	23510	3960	2065	1895	881	469	412	
84	Benniganahalli	East	Banaswadi	C. V. Raman Nagar	Bangalore Central	7397	4107155.40	410.72	4.11	1014.90	31985	17006	14979	7346	3789	3557	947	497	450	
85	Sarvagnanagar	East	Sarvagnanagar	C. V. Raman Nagar	Bangalore Central	7729	3663310.24	366.33	3.66	905.22	34943	17879	17064	12221	6211	6010	261	129	132	Cox Town
86	Maruthisevanagar	East	Sarvagnanagar	Sarvagnanagar	Bangalore Central	8882	2114407.44	211.44	2.11	522.48	39586	19746	19840	8633	4368	4265	109	59	50	
87	Lingarajapura	East	Sarvagnanagar	Sarvagnanagar	Bangalore Central	12345	1312366.28	131.24	1.31	324.29	56530	28827	27703	7796	3946	3850	413	205	208	
88	Banaswadi	East	Banaswadi	Sarvagnanagar	Bangalore Central	5911	3246138.04	324.61	3.25	802.14	26103	13883	12220	2678	1373	1305	263	149	114	
89	Kacharakanahalli	East	Sarvagnanagar	Sarvagnanagar	Bangalore Central	7757	1806059.16	180.61	1.81	446.29	32889	16712	16177	3009	1532	1477	306	155	151	
90	Sagaypuram	East	Kadugondanahalli	Pulakeshinagar	Bangalore North	7847	611885.28	61.19	0.61	151.20	43432	21950	21482	13347	6821	6526	173	92	81	
91	Pulikeshinagar	East	Jayamahal	Pulakeshinagar	Bangalore North	8490	1483060.20	148.31	1.48	366.47	42078	20839	21239	7188	3549	3639	138	65	73	Fraser Town / Frazer Town
92	Jayamahal	East	Jayamahal	Shivajinagar	Bangalore Central	8142	2239818.40	223.98	2.24	553.47	39663	20405	19258	7305	3717	3588	131	66	65	
93	Devarajeevanahalli	East	Jayamahal	Pulakeshinagar	Bangalore North	9701	1166833.48	116.68	1.17	288.33	51578	26705	24873	8963	4619	4344	102	53	49	
94	Kadugondanahalli	East	Kadugondanahalli	Sarvagnanagar	Bangalore Central	11654	1945744.96	194.57	1.95	480.80	60896	31314	29582	7928	4045	3883	159	86	73	Kushal Nagar / Venkateshpura
95	Kaval Byrasandra	East	Kadugondanahalli	Pulakeshinagar	Bangalore North	16765	2841148.00	284.11	2.84	702.06	84461	43549	40912	13111	6701	6410	391	194	197	
96	Hebbal	East	Hebbal	Hebbal	Bangalore North	16809	2507638.44	250.76	2.51	619.65	74126	38938	35188	7216	3637	3579	1205	627	578	
97	Jayachamrajendra Nagar	East	Jayamahal	Hebbal	Bangalore North	8010	1826749.96	182.67	1.83	451.40	38042	20092	17950	2513	1287	1226	236	133	103	JC Nagar
98	Ganganagar	East	Hebbal	Hebbal	Bangalore North	11907	2927402.16	292.74	2.93	723.38	52546	27583	24963	4080	2114	1966	386	204	182	
99	Aramane nagar	East	Hebbal	Malleshwaram	Bangalore North	7129	1206487.64	120.65	1.21	298.13	32560	16844	15716	3930	1981	1949	265	137	128	Sadashivanagar
100	Sanjayanagar	West	Sanjayanagar	Hebbal	Bangalore North	12027	5521063.20	552.11	5.52	1364.28	52263	27372	24891	4431	2269	2162	672	345	327	

== See also ==
- 1996 Bangalore Municipal Corporation election
- 2001 Bangalore Municipal Corporation election
- List of wards in Bangalore
- List of wards in Bangalore (2010-2020)
- List of wards in Bangalore (1989-1995)
