= 1996 Bangalore Mahanagara Palike election =

Local election in Bangalore, India

100 of 100 seats in the Bangalore Mahanagara Palike 51 seats needed for a majority

	Majority party	Minority party	Third party
		JD
Party	Indian National Congress	Janata Dal	Bharatiya Janata Party
BMP majority before election
INC
Elected BMP majority
INC

The 1996 Bangalore Mahanagara Palike (Bangalore City Corporation) election was held in October 1996 in all 100 Wards of Bangalore

== Background ==
In 1989, the BMP expanded to include 87 wards and further increased to 100 wards in 1995, covering an extra area of 75 sq. km. The council also included 40 additional members drawn from the parliament and the state legislature. The tenure of the Bangalore Mahanagara Palike ended in May 1995. A new election was necessary to elect new Corporators and Mayor

Around the same time, the BMP council passed a resolution that only BDA layouts should be included in its limits and not revenue pockets, because of the cost of developing the latter. Around 50 per cent of the expanded BMP areas (meaning at least 40 wards among 100) were revenue pockets at that time. At that time, the BMP proposed betterment charges of Rs.215/sq. yard based on costs of developing those areas. But after the BMP elections of 1996, the council took a decision to reduce betterment charges to Rs.100/sq. yard. The state government (the H. D. Deve Gowda led administration) then issued a notice to the city council demanding why the latter reduced the rates. Subsequently, the state government agreed to the BMP rates.

=== Organization ===
New Mayor will be elected for a term of one year and Corporators will be in office for 5 years

== Schedule ==
The schedule of the election was announced by the State Election Commission in August 1996 and date of counting / announcement of result was in October 1996

== Results ==
Ward No.	Ward Name	Zone	Sub-Division	Assembly Constituency	Lok Sabha Constituency	Area	Population (2001)			Elected Corporator (1996 elections)			Alternate Name
Ward No.	Ward Name	Zone	Sub-Division	Assembly Constituency	Lok Sabha Constituency		Total	SCs	STs	Corporator Name	Party	Reservation category	Alternate Name
1	HMT	West	Yeshwanthpura	Rajarajeshwarinagar	Bangalore Rural		27637	6146	935				HMT Colony
2	Jalahalli	West	Yeshwanthpura	Rajarajeshwarinagar	Bangalore Rural		36125	5153	1110				
3	Yeshwanthpura	West	Yeshwanthpura	Rajarajeshwarinagar	Bangalore Rural		46677	4119	675				Yesvanthpur
4	Mathikere	West	Sanjayanagar	Malleshwaram	Bangalore North		54704	4541	997				Mattikere
5	Kodandaramapura	West	Malleshwaram	Malleshwaram	Bangalore North		36287	2088	313				Kodandarama Nagar
6	Dattatreya Temple	West	Malleshwaram	Gandhi Nagar	Bangalore Central		38723	4714	261				
7	Malleshwaram	West	Malleshwaram	Malleshwaram	Bangalore North		37760	4186	274				Kadu Malleshwara / Subedarpalya
8	Gayathrinagar	West	Gayathrinagar	Malleshwaram	Bangalore North		40673	1056	249				
9	Subrahmanyanagar	West	Mahalakshmipura	Malleshwaram	Bangalore North		38905	1081	326				
10	Mahalakshmipura	West	Mahalakshmipura	Mahalakshmi Layout	Bangalore North		34702	5163	341				Mahalakshmi Layout
11	Peenya Industrial Town	West	Mahalakshmipura	Rajarajeshwarinagar	Bangalore Rural		35403	4554	1137				
12	Nandini Layout	West	Mahalakshmipura	Mahalakshmi Layout	Bangalore North		43445	4814	655				
13	Geleyarabalaga	West	Gayathrinagar	Mahalakshmi Layout	Bangalore North		38743	1022	309				Geleyara Balaga Layout
14	Nagapura	West	Gayathrinagar	Mahalakshmi Layout	Bangalore North		36918	2622	353				
15	Rajajinagar	West	Rajajinagar	Rajaji Nagar	Bangalore Central		37005	2234	269				
16	Kamalanagar	West	Rajajinagar	Mahalakshmi Layout	Bangalore North		61314	7301	625				Kamala Nagar
17	Vrishabhavathinagar	West	Srirama Mandir	Mahalakshmi Layout	Bangalore North		29275	546	279	K. Gopalaiah	Janata Dal		Vrushabhavathi Valley
18	Kamakshipalya	West	Srirama Mandir	Rajaji Nagar	Bangalore Central		25742	2004	321				
19	Basaveshwaranagar	West	Rajajinagar	Rajaji Nagar	Bangalore Central		23228	1207	206				
20	Shivanagara	West	Rajajinagar	Rajaji Nagar	Bangalore Central		28121	680	229				
21	Rajajinagar Industrial Town	West	Srirama Mandir	Govindraj Nagar	Bangalore South		47682	5061	730				Industrial Town Rajaji Nagar
22	Srirama Mandir	West	Srirama Mandir	Rajaji Nagar	Bangalore Central		41471	1087	327				Shree Ramamandira
23	Prakashnagar	West	Gayathrinagar	Rajaji Nagar	Bangalore Central		35465	1994	140	G. Padmavathi			
24	Bhashyamnagar	West	Gandhinagar	Rajaji Nagar	Bangalore Central		34595	10651	170				
25	Ramachandrapura	West	Gandhinagar	Gandhi Nagar	Bangalore Central		35411	4343	272				Kuvempunagar
26	Sevashrama	West	Gandhinagar	Gandhi Nagar	Bangalore Central		37507	12398	516				
27	Gandhinagar	West	Gandhinagar	Gandhi Nagar	Bangalore Central		32809	6296	158				
28	Chikkapete	West	Chikkapete	Gandhi Nagar	Bangalore Central		31851	219	89				Chickpet
29	Cottonpet	West	Chikkapete	Gandhi Nagar	Bangalore Central		40704	2765	305				
30	Sri Krishnarajendra Market	West	Chikkapete	Chamrajpet	Bangalore Central		39521	17616	344				KR Market
31	Binnipet	South	Binnipet	Gandhi Nagar	Bangalore Central		28069	2466	622				Binnypete
32	Kempapura Agrahara	South	Binnipet	Vijay Nagar	Bangalore South		40047	1354	1078				
33	Vijayanagar	South	Binnipet	Vijay Nagar	Bangalore South		40867	1534	282				Vijaynagar
34	R P C Layout	South	Binnipet	Vijay Nagar	Bangalore South		44368	4668	460				
35	Marenahalli	South	Govindarajanagar	Govindraj Nagar	Bangalore South		40131	1759	669				
36	Govindarajanagar	South	Govindarajanagar	Govindraj Nagar	Bangalore South		56340	3216	689				
37	Amarajyothinagar	South	Govindarajanagar	Govindraj Nagar	Bangalore South		21896	647	464				
38	Moodalapalya	South	Govindarajanagar	Govindraj Nagar	Bangalore South		15597	890	237				
39	Chandra Layout	South	Nagarabhavi	Govindraj Nagar	Bangalore South		40478	4397	484				
40	Attiguppe	South	Nagarabhavi	Vijay Nagar	Bangalore South		25619	1288	231				
41	Gali Anjaneyaswamy Temple	South	Nagarabhavi	Vijay Nagar	Bangalore South		51746	2790	512				Ghali Anjaneya Temple
42	Bapujinagar	South	Jagajeeevanaram Nagar	Vijay Nagar	Bangalore South		43223	3314	481				
43	Padarayanapura	South	Jagajeeevanaram Nagar	Chamrajpet	Bangalore Central		59933	4108	447				
44	Jagajeeevanaram Nagar	South	Jagajeeevanaram Nagar	Chamrajpet	Bangalore Central		43892	12594	281				
45	Azadnagar	South	Jagajeeevanaram Nagar	Chamrajpet	Bangalore Central		40821	2630	825	Venkatachala			
46	Chamarajapet	West	Chamarajapet	Chamrajpet	Bangalore Central		40725	4151	483				
47	Dharamarayaswamy Temple	West	Chamarajapet	Chickpet	Bangalore South		32938	2036	108				Kalasipalya
48	Sudhamanagar	West	Chamarajapet	Chickpet	Bangalore South		42919	10099	346				
49	Kempegowdanagar	South	Basavanagudi	Chickpet	Bangalore South		41075	2162	352				Sunkenahalli
50	Vishveshwarapuram	South	Basavanagudi	Chickpet	Bangalore South		31893	1676	78				
51	Basavanagudi	South	Basavanagudi	Basavanagudi	Bangalore South		39484	1002	216	B. S. Sathyanarayana	Bharatiya Janata Party	General	
52	Hanumanthanagar	South	Hanumanthanagar	Basavanagudi	Bangalore South		35660	903	296	K. Chandrashekhar	Indian National Congress	General	Gavipuram
53	Srinagar	South	Hanumanthanagar	Basavanagudi	Bangalore South		62163	654	272				
54	Srinivasnagar	South	Hanumanthanagar	Basavanagudi	Bangalore South		82630	2725	640				
55	Padmanabhanagar	South	Padmanabhanagar	Padmanabhanagar	Bangalore South		112407	5371	1041				
56	Ganeshamandira	South	Padmanabhanagar	Padmanabhanagar	Bangalore South		87307	5438	1084				
57	J P Nagar	South	Jayanagar	Jayanagar	Bangalore South		63906	4153	750				Jayaprakash Nagar
58	Jayanagar	South	Jayanagar	Jayanagar	Bangalore South		40430	2103	198				
59	Yadiyuru	South	Jayanagar	Padmanabhanagar	Bangalore South		34613	1448	134				Yediyur
60	Pattabhiramanagar	South	Jayanagar	Jayanagar	Bangalore South		39308	4194	119	C. K. Ramamurthy	Bharatiya Janata Party		
61	Mavalli	South	Hombegowdanagar	Chickpet	Bangalore South		39505	4037	191				
62	Homegowdanagar	South	Hombegowdanagar	Chickpet	Bangalore South		53934	6312	394				
63	Lakkasandra	South	Hombegowdanagar	B.T.M Layout	Bangalore South		48979	6610	669				
64	Gurappanapalya	South	Madiwala	Jayanagar	Bangalore South		63111	5497	252				
65	B T M Layout	South	Madiwala	B.T.M Layout	Bangalore South		51545	3195	383				
66	Madiwala	South	Madiwala	B.T.M Layout	Bangalore South		65820	6499	1107				
67	Koramangala	East	Koramangala	B.T.M Layout	Bangalore South		45929	6816	542				
68	Ejipura	East	Koramangala	B.T.M Layout	Bangalore South		40986	5487	520				
69	Neelasandra	East	Koramangala	Shanthinagar	Bangalore Central		52079	6678	2161				
70	Shanthinagar	East	Shanthinagar	Shanthinagar	Bangalore Central		34682	4126	668				
71	Austin Town	East	Shanthinagar	Shanthinagar	Bangalore Central		39790	15542	390				
72	Domlur	East	Jeevanabima Nagar	Shanthinagar	Bangalore Central		44357	6333	385				
73	HAL Airport	East	Jeevanabima Nagar	C. V. Raman Nagar	Bangalore Central		42288	8351	239	Suresh Babu			Airport
74	Jeevanabima Nagar	East	Jeevanabima Nagar	C. V. Raman Nagar	Bangalore Central		39820	5431	289				
75	Jogupalya	East	Jeevanabima Nagar	Shanthinagar	Bangalore Central		36035	6194	611				
76	Richmond Town	East	Shanthinagar	Shanthinagar	Bangalore Central		36465	4975	126				
77	Sampangiramanagar	East	Shivajinagar	Shivajinagar	Bangalore Central		32451	1372	296				
78	Vasanthanagar	East	Shivajinagar	Shivajinagar	Bangalore Central		37028	4639	750				
79	Shivajinagar	East	Shivajinagar	Shivajinagar	Bangalore Central		34988	1420	513				
80	Bharathinagar	East	Bharathinagar	Shivajinagar	Bangalore Central		35681	2189	186				
81	Halasuru	East	Bharathinagar	Shivajinagar	Bangalore Central		39669	6638	871				Ulsoor
82	Hoysalanagar	East	Bharathinagar	C. V. Raman Nagar	Bangalore Central		33359	10497	210				
83	C. V. Raman Nagar	East	Banaswadi	C. V. Raman Nagar	Bangalore Central		50256	3960	881				
84	Benniganahalli	East	Banaswadi	C. V. Raman Nagar	Bangalore Central		31985	7346	947				
85	Sarvagnanagar	East	Sarvagnanagar	C. V. Raman Nagar	Bangalore Central		34943	12221	261				Cox Town
86	Maruthisevanagar	East	Sarvagnanagar	Sarvagnanagar	Bangalore Central		39586	8633	109				
87	Lingarajapura	East	Sarvagnanagar	Sarvagnanagar	Bangalore Central		56530	7796	413				
88	Banaswadi	East	Banaswadi	Sarvagnanagar	Bangalore Central		26103	2678	263				
89	Kacharakanahalli	East	Sarvagnanagar	Sarvagnanagar	Bangalore Central		32889	3009	306	Padmanabha Reddy			
90	Sagaypuram	East	Kadugondanahalli	Pulakeshinagar	Bangalore North		43432	13347	173				
91	Pulikeshinagar	East	Jayamahal	Pulakeshinagar	Bangalore North		42078	7188	138				Fraser Town / Frazer Town
92	Jayamahal	East	Jayamahal	Shivajinagar	Bangalore Central		39663	7305	131				
93	Devarajeevanahalli	East	Jayamahal	Pulakeshinagar	Bangalore North		51578	8963	102				
94	Kadugondanahalli	East	Kadugondanahalli	Sarvagnanagar	Bangalore Central		60896	7928	159				Kushal Nagar / Venkateshpura
95	Kaval Byrasandra	East	Kadugondanahalli	Pulakeshinagar	Bangalore North		84461	13111	391				
96	Hebbal	East	Hebbal	Hebbal	Bangalore North		74126	7216	1205				
97	Jayachamrajendra Nagar	East	Jayamahal	Hebbal	Bangalore North		38042	2513	236				JC Nagar
98	Ganganagar	East	Hebbal	Hebbal	Bangalore North		52546	4080	386				
99	Aramane nagar	East	Hebbal	Malleshwaram	Bangalore North		32560	3930	265				Sadashivanagar
100	Sanjayanagar	West	Sanjayanagar	Hebbal	Bangalore North		52263	4431	672				

== See also ==
- List of wards in Bangalore (1995-2006)
- List of wards in Bangalore
- Elections in Karnataka
- Bangalore Mahanagara Palike
