= List of wards in Bangalore (2009–2023) =

For administrative purposes, the city of Bangalore was divided into nine zones, which are further subdivided into a total of 198 wards administered by the Bruhat Bengaluru Mahanagara Palike (BBMP) which was renamed from Bangalore Mahanagara Palike (BMP).

Ward No.	Ward Name	Taluk	Hobli	Assembly Constituency	Lok Sabha Constituency	Area (km²)	Household (HH) - 2011	Population		Popn density		Popn growth rate (%) 2001 - 2011	HH growth rate (%) 2001 - 2011	BBMP Zone	BBMP Division	BBMP Sub-Division	Map	Ref
Ward No.	Ward Name	Taluk	Hobli	Assembly Constituency	Lok Sabha Constituency	Area (km²)	Household (HH) - 2011	2001	2011	2001	2011	Popn growth rate (%) 2001 - 2011	HH growth rate (%) 2001 - 2011	BBMP Zone	BBMP Division	BBMP Sub-Division	Map	Ref
1	Kempegowda Ward	Bangalore North (Additional)	Yelahanka-1	Yelahanka	Chikballapur	10.9	8647	21866	34783	2006	3182	59.10	72.60	Yelahanka	Yelahanka	Yelahanka		
2	Chowdeshwari Ward	Bangalore North (Additional)	Yelahanka-1	Yelahanka	Chikballapur	6.5	9506	19626	36602	3019	5635	86.50	111.00	Yelahanka	Yelahanka	Yelahanka		
3	Attur	Bangalore North (Additional)	Yelahanka-3	Yelahanka	Chikballapur	8.8	14605	24020	58129	2729	6606	142.00	171.3	Yelahanka	Yelahanka	Yelahanka		
4	Yelahanka Satellite Town	Bangalore North (Additional)	Yelahanka-1	Yelahanka	Chikballapur	4.6	10583	25782	41986	5604	9224	62.90	70.30	Yelahanka	Yelahanka	Yelahanka		
5	Jakkur	Bangalore North (Additional)	Yelahanka-2	Byatarayanapura	Bangalore North	23.5	12387	20964	52025	892	2215	148.20	168.80	Yelahanka	Byatarayanapura	Byatarayanapura		
6	Thanisandra	Bangalore East	Krishnarajapuram	Byatarayanapura	Bangalore North	10.0	16470	20402	71855	2040	7161	252.20	301.90	Yelahanka	Byatarayanapura	Byatarayanapura		
7	Byatarayanapura	Bangalore North (Additional)	Yelahanka-2	Byatarayanapura	Bangalore North	10.0	18691	31400	72154	3140	7198	129.80	151.30	Yelahanka	Byatarayanapura	Byatarayanapura		
8	Kodigehalli	Bangalore North (Additional)	Yelahanka-3	Byatarayanapura	Bangalore North	3.8	12036	21635	47546	5693	12369	119.80	134.50	Yelahanka	Byatarayanapura	Byatarayanapura		
9	Vidyaranyapura	Bangalore North (Additional)	Yelahanka-3	Byatarayanapura	Bangalore North	9.9	14448	23136	57195	2337	5753	147.20	165.50	Yelahanka	Byatarayanapura	Vidyaranyapura		
10	Doddabommasandra	Bangalore North (Additional)	Yelahanka-3	Byatarayanapura	Bangalore North	4.2	8379	21640	36396	5152	8673	68.20	66.60	Yelahanka	Byatarayanapura	Vidyaranyapura		
11	Kuvempunagar	Bangalore North (Additional)	Yelahanka-2	Byatarayanapura	Bangalore North	7.1	8519	25295	37128	3563	5207	46.80	53.20	Yelahanka	Byatarayanapura	Vidyaranyapura		
12	Shettyhalli	Bangalore North	Yeshwanthpura-1	Dasarahalli	Bangalore North	8.1	15530	28309	61071	3495	7521	115.70	131.10	Dasarahalli	Dasarahalli	Shettyhalli		
13	Mallasandra	Bangalore North	Yeshwanthpura-1	Dasarahalli	Bangalore North	1.3	11221	26253	41482	20195	31753	58.00	93.20	Dasarahalli	Dasarahalli	Shettyhalli		
14	Bagalagunte	Bangalore North	Yeshwanthpura-1	Dasarahalli	Bangalore North	4.3	17117	28306	65113	6583	15203	130.00	137.00	Dasarahalli	Dasarahalli	T. Dasarahalli		
15	T. Dasarahalli	Bangalore North	Yeshwanthpura-2	Dasarahalli	Bangalore North	0.9	8849	26050	33042	28944	37474	26.80	32.10	Dasarahalli	Dasarahalli	T. Dasarahalli		
16	Jalahalli	Bangalore North	Yeshwanthpura-1	Rajarajeshwarinagar	Bangalore Rural	5.2	9191	29037	37959	5584	7354	90.70	37.30	Rajarajeshwarinagar	Yeshwanthpura	Yeshwanthpura		
17	J. P. Park	Bangalore North	City Circle	Rajarajeshwarinagar	Bangalore Rural	2.0	12553	35174	49610	17587	24203	41.00	54.10	Rajarajeshwarinagar	Yeshwanthpura	Yeshwanthpura		
18	Radhakrishna Temple	Bangalore North	Yeshwanthpura-1	Hebbal	Bangalore North	1.9	9058	26211	35122	13795	18014	36.30	48.20	East	Hebbal	Hebbal		
19	Sanjaynagar	Bangalore North	Kasaba-2	Hebbal	Bangalore North	1.5	8153	24178	32491	16119	21096	34.40	45.10	East	Hebbal	Hebbal		
20	Ganganagar	Bangalore North (Additional)	City Circle	Hebbal	Bangalore North	2.3	6592	26256	27361	11416	12096	34.40	45.10	East	Hebbal	Hebbal		
21	Hebbala	Bangalore North	Kasaba-2	Hebbal	Bangalore North	1.2	8181	24161	32516	20134	26455	34.60	43.40	East	Hebbal	Hebbal		
22	Vishwanatha Nagenahalli	Bangalore North	Kasaba-2	Hebbal	Bangalore North	1.5	12704	25697	51592	17131	34772	100.80	117.60	East	Hebbal	Jayachamarajendranagar		
23	Nagavara	Bangalore North	Kasaba-1	Sarvagnanagar	Bangalore Central	2.1	12295	35264	60483	16792	29205	71.50	89.50	East	Sarvagnanagar	HBR Layout		
24	HBR Layout	Bangalore North	Kasaba-1	Sarvagnanagar	Bangalore Central	4.6	13612	32156	58967	6990	12717	83.40	108.00	East	Sarvagnanagar	HBR Layout		
25	Horamavu	Bangalore East	Krishnarajapuram	Krishnarajapuram	Bangalore North	17.5	23999	28167	95368	1610	5437	238.60	288.00	Mahadevapura	Krishnarajapuram	Horamavu		
26	Ramamurthynagar	Bangalore East	Krishnarajapuram	Krishnarajapuram	Bangalore North	7.3	11674	21999	47358	3013	6523	115.30	143.50	Mahadevapura	Krishnarajapuram	Horamavu		
27	Banaswadi	Bangalore East	Krishnarajapuram	Sarvagnanagar	Bangalore Central	3.4	12922	31998	51268	9411	14940	60.20	75.60	East	Maruthisevanagar	HBR Layout		
28	Kammanahalli	Bangalore South	Begur	Sarvagnanagar	Bangalore Central	1.0	11479	34819	47074	34819	45494	35.20	46.30	East	Maruthisevanagar	HBR Layout		
29	Kacharakanahalli	Bangalore North	Kasaba-1	Sarvagnanagar	Bangalore Central	1.7	8700	29018	33588	17069	19916	15.70	28.40	East	Maruthisevanagar	HBR Layout		
30	Kadugondanahalli	Bangalore North	Kasaba-1	Sarvagnanagar	Bangalore Central	0.7	9758	34842	45748	49774	65514	31.30	49.70	East	Sarvagnanagar	HBR Layout		
31	Kushalnagar	Bangalore North (Additional)	City Circle	Pulakeshinagar	Bangalore North	0.6	8192	34046	41936	56743	65065	23.20	35.20	East	Pulakeshinagar	Kadugondanahalli		
32	Kavalbyrasandra	Bangalore North	Kasaba-2	Pulakeshinagar	Bangalore North	1.6	9540	26550	39334	16594	24771	48.20	56.80	East	Pulakeshinagar	Kadugondanahalli		
33	Manorayanapalya	Bangalore South	Tavarekere	Hebbal	Bangalore North	0.8	10572	34777	47926	43471	59123	37.80	48.48	East	Hebbal	Jayachamarajendranagar		
34	Gangenahalli	Bangalore South	Tavarekere	Hebbal	Bangalore North	1.1	6058	24954	24308	22685	22226	-2.60	3.90	East	Hebbal	Jayachamarajendranagar		
35	Aramanenagar	Bangalore North	City Circle	Malleshwaram	Bangalore North	7.5	8825	30397	36738	4053	4919	20.90	33.30	West	Malleshwaram	Mattikere		
36	Mathikere	Bangalore North	City Circle	Malleshwaram	Bangalore North	0.9	9592	35882	37036	39869	41069	3.20	11.80	West	Malleshwaram	Mattikere		
37	Yeshwanthpura	Bangalore North	City Circle	Rajarajeshwarinagar	Bangalore Rural	0.8	10326	35972	41107	44965	53039	14.30	28.60	Rajarajeshwarinagar	Yeshwanthpura	Yeshwanthpura		
38	H. M. T.	Bangalore North	Yeshwanthpura-1	Rajarajeshwarinagar	Bangalore Rural	5.2	9524	29764	36879	5724	7053	23.90	31.70	Rajarajeshwarinagar	Yeshwanthpura	Goraguntepalya		
39	Chokkasandra	Bangalore North	Yeshwanthpura-2	Dasarahalli	Bangalore North	3.8	16537	30117	59289	7926	15752	96.90	106.40	Dasarahalli	Hegganahalli	Peenya Industrial Town		
40	Dodda Bidarkallu	Bangalore North	Yeshwanthpura-2	Yeshvanthapura	Bangalore North	12.9	19506	19349	72794	1500	5649	276.20	309.60	Rajarajeshwarinagar	Kengeri	Herohalli		
41	Peenya Industrial Area	Bangalore North	Yeshwanthpura-1	Dasarahalli	Bangalore North	5.5	15805	27467	57814	4994	10423	110.50	121.20	Dasarahalli	Hegganahalli	Peenya Industrial Town		
42	Lakshmidevinagar	Bangalore North	Yeshwanthpura-1	Rajarajeshwarinagar	Bangalore Rural	1.5	10620	25578	41352	17052	27235	61.70	71.00	Rajarajeshwarinagar	Yeshwanthpura	Goraguntepalya		
43	Nandini Layout	Bangalore North	City Circle	Mahalakshmi Layout	Bangalore North	1.4	13291	34318	51200	24513	36191	49.20	57.90	West	Mahalakshmi Layout	Mahalakshmi Layout		
44	Marappana Palya	Bangalore North	City Circle	Mahalakshmi Layout	Bangalore North	2.0	10051	34002	40212	17001	19785	18.30	28.50	West	Mahalakshmi Layout	Mahalakshmi Layout		
45	Malleshwaram	Bangalore North	City Circle	Malleshwaram	Bangalore North	1.8	8503	36321	34196	20178	18939	-5.90	-0.2	West	Malleshwaram	Mattikere		
46	Jayachamarajendranagar	Bangalore North (Additional)	City Circle	Hebbal	Bangalore North	0.9	7696	30743	31449	34159	35246	2.30	14.50	East	Hebbal	Jayachamarajendranagar		
47	Devarajeevanahalli	Bangalore North	Kasaba-1	Pulakeshinagar	Bangalore North	1.4	8941	33483	42135	23916	30833	25.80	35.20	East	Pulakeshinagar	Pulakeshinagar		
48	Muneshwaranagar	Bangalore South	City Circle	Pulakeshinagar	Bangalore North	0.5	7419	30508	35814	61016	74511	17.40	26.90	East	Pulakeshinagar	Kadugondanahalli		
49	Lingarajapuram	Bangalore North	Kasaba-1	Sarvagnanagar	Bangalore Central	0.9	8850	32375	37955	35972	43274	17.20	29.70	East	Sarvagnanagar	Maruthiseva Nagar		
50	Benniganahalli	Bangalore East	Krishnarajapuram	C. V. Raman Nagar	Bangalore Central	4.9	12384	31985	49094	6528	9980	53.50	67.40	East	C. V. Raman Nagar	C. V. Raman Nagar		
51	Vijinapura	Bangalore East	Krishnarajapuram	Krishnarajapuram	Bangalore North	2.1	11087	35087	46159	16708	22464	31.60	42.50	Mahadevapura	Krishnarajapuram	Horamavu		
52	Krishnarajapuram	Bangalore East	Krishnarajapuram	Krishnarajapuram	Bangalore North	4.8	8961	26485	35168	5518	7308	32.80	52.80	Mahadevapura	Krishnarajapuram	Krishnarajapuram		
53	Basavanapura	Bangalore East	Krishnarajapuram	Krishnarajapuram	Bangalore North	6.3	11936	22012	48585	3494	7740	12.70	134.00	Mahadevapura	Krishnarajapuram	Krishnarajapuram		
54	Hoodi	Bangalore East	Whitefield	Mahadevapura	Bangalore Central	15	12579	20700	50191	1380	3349	142.50	168.20	Mahadevapura	Mahadevapura	Hoodi		
55	Devasandra	Bangalore East	Krishnarajapuram	Krishnarajapuram	Bangalore North	3.5	8638	22057	33946	6302	9754	53.90	69.70	Mahadevapura	Krishnarajapuram	Krishnarajapuram		
56	A. Narayanapura	Bangalore East	Krishnarajapuram	Krishnarajapuram	Bangalore North	2.1	11039	29420	43443	14010	20286	47.70	62.30	Mahadevapura	Krishnarajapuram	HAL Airport		
57	C. V. Raman Nagar	Bangalore East	Krishnarajapuram	C. V. Raman Nagar	Bangalore Central	3.6	16710	29760	58815	8267	16379	97.60	125.80	East	C. V. Raman Nagar	C. V. Raman Nagar		
58	Hosathippasandra	Bangalore East	Krishnarajapuram	C. V. Raman Nagar	Bangalore Central	3.4	12200	34577	43983	10170	13085	27.20	44.60	East	C. V. Raman Nagar	C. V. Raman Nagar		
59	Maruthisevanagar	Bangalore East	Krishnarajapuram	Sarvagnanagar	Bangalore Central	2.4	10113	35811	40362	14921	16942	12.70	26.50	East	Sarvagnanagar	Maruthiseva Nagar		
60	Sagayarapuram	Bangalore North (Additional)	City Circle	Pulakeshinagar	Bangalore North	0.8	7340	34874	35334	43593	45792	1.30	16.80	East	Pulakeshinagar	Kadugondanahalli		
61	S. K. Garden	Bangalore North (Additional)	City Circle	Pulakeshinagar	Bangalore North	1.3	7941	33939	38050	26107	29129	12.10	26.50	East	Pulakeshinagar	Pulakeshinagar		
62	Ramaswamypalya	Bangalore North (Additional)	City Circle	Shivajinagar	Bangalore Central	0.8	7530	32400	34394	40500	41334	6.20	14.50	East	Shivajinagar	Vasanthnagar		
63	Jayamahal	Bangalore North (Additional)	City Circle	Shivajinagar	Bangalore Central	1.4	4808	24065	21728	17189	14986	-9.70	4.20	East	Shivajinagar	Vasanthnagar		
64	Rajamahal	Bangalore North	City Circle	Malleshwaram	Bangalore North	0.7	7641	33964	31118	48520	43530	-8.40	-1.00	West	Malleshwaram	Malleshwaram		
65	Kadumalleshwara	Bangalore North	City Circle	Malleshwaram	Bangalore North	1.4	9823	34053	35609	24324	26086	4.60	15.70	West	Malleshwaram	Malleshwaram		
66	Subrahmanyanagar	Bangalore North	City Circle	Malleshwaram	Bangalore North	0.9	9383	34833	35709	38703	37919	2.40	10.00	West	Malleshwaram	Malleshwaram		
67	Nagapura	Bangalore North	City Circle	Mahalakshmi Layout	Bangalore North	1.8	8667	35553	34575	19752	19260	-2.80	6.90	West	Mahalakshmi Layout	Nagapura		
68	Mahalakshmipuram	Bangalore North	City Circle	Mahalakshmi Layout	Bangalore North	0.9	11563	35976	44615	39973	47275	24.00	33.00	West	Mahalakshmi Layout	Mahalakshmi Layout		
69	Laggere	Bangalore North	Yeshwanthpura-1	Rajarajeshwarinagar	Bangalore Rural	1.6	15178	25370	57077	15856	36245	125.00	137.40	Rajarajeshwarinagar	Rajarajeshwarinagar	Laggere		
70	Rajagopalanagar	Bangalore North	Yeshwanthpura-1	Dasarahalli	Bangalore North	2.2	17262	28604	61479	13002	28249	114.90	134.50	Dasarahalli	Hegganahalli	Hegganahalli		
71	Hegganahalli	Bangalore North	Yeshwanthpura-2	Dasarahalli	Bangalore North	1.8	18438	30889	66314	17161	37639	114.70	133.00	Dasarahalli	Hegganahalli	Hegganahalli		
72	Herohalli	Bangalore North	Yeshwanthpura-2	Yeshvanthapura	Bangalore North	7.8	16215	19668	62272	2522	8035	216.60	240.00	Rajarajeshwarinagar	Kengeri	Herohalli		
73	Kottigepalya	Bangalore North	Yeshwanthpura-2	Rajarajeshwarinagar	Bangalore Rural	5.8	17739	29100	68922	5017	11784	136.80	148.70	Rajarajeshwarinagar	Rajarajeshwarinagar	Laggere		
74	Shakthiganapathinagar	Bangalore North	City Circle	Mahalakshmi Layout	Bangalore North	0.7	11074	34530	43844	49329	62588	27.00	37.40	West	Mahalakshmi Layout	Mahalakshmi Layout		
75	Shankara Matha	Bangalore North	City Circle	Mahalakshmi Layout	Bangalore North	1.1	12433	35679	48734	32435	44963	36.60	48.60	West	Mahalakshmi Layout	Nagapura		
76	Gayathrinagar	Bangalore North	City Circle	Malleshwaram	Bangalore North	0.6	8489	35389	33236	58982	51465	-6.10	0.90	West	Malleshwaram	Malleshwaram		
77	Dattathreya Temple	Bangalore North	City Circle	Gandhi Nagar	Bangalore Central	0.7	8325	34236	33388	48909	46485	-2.50	4.40	West	Gandhinagar	Gandhinagar		
78	Pulakeshinagar	Bangalore North (Additional)	City Circle	Pulakeshinagar	Bangalore North	1.7	6595	28149	28835	16558	16761	2.40	13.00	East	Pulakeshinagar	Pulakeshinagar		
79	Sarvagnanagar	Bangalore East	Krishnarajapuram	C. V. Raman Nagar	Bangalore Central	3.6	9052	34943	37291	9706	10218	6.70	17.10	East	C. V. Raman Nagar	C. V. Raman Nagar		
80	Hoysalanagar	Bangalore East	Krishnarajapuram	C. V. Raman Nagar	Bangalore Central	2.1	8877	35890	35228	17090	17131	-1.80	11.60	East	C. V. Raman Nagar	Jeevanabima Nagar		
81	Vignananagar	Bangalore East	Krishnarajapuram	Krishnarajapuram	Bangalore North	5.7	15419	24757	57062	4343	9935	130.50	165.30	Mahadevapura	Krishnarajapuram	HAL Airport		
82	Garudacharpalya	Bangalore East	Whitefield	Mahadevapura	Bangalore Central	6.8	13453	20920	49631	3076	7316	137.20	154.90	Mahadevapura	Krishnarajapuram	Hoodi		
83	Kadugudi	Bangalore East	Bidarahalli	Mahadevapura	Bangalore Central	11.2	11423	22205	43942	1983	3934	97.90	122.80	Mahadevapura	Krishnarajapuram	Whitefield		
84	Hagadooru	Bangalore East	Whitefield	Mahadevapura	Bangalore Central	12.6	13419	25915	50556	2057	4003	95.10	124.10	Mahadevapura	Krishnarajapuram	Whitefield		
85	Doddanekkundi	Bangalore East	Varthur	Mahadevapura	Bangalore Central	12.0	17755	22016	63083	1835	5270	186.5	235.80	Mahadevapura	Krishnarajapuram	Hoodi		
86	Marathahalli	Bangalore East	Varthur	Mahadevapura	Bangalore Central	3.1	11051	22489	39768	7255	12679	76.80	107.30	Mahadevapura	Mahadevapura	Marathahalli		
87	HAL Airport	Bangalore East	Varthur	Krishnarajapuram	Bangalore North	6.8	10044	33066	39926	4863	5888	20.70	35.20	Mahadevapura	Krishnarajapuram	HAL Airport		
88	Jeevanabima Nagar	Bangalore East	Varthur	C. V. Raman Nagar	Bangalore Central	1.9	9741	36152	38251	19027	20286	5.80	17.50	East	C. V. Raman Nagar	Jeevanabima Nagar		
89	Jogupalya	Bangalore North	City Circle	Shanthinagar	Bangalore Central	0.9	8806	34611	33793	38457	37452	-2.40	8.40	East	Shanthinagar	Domlur		
90	Ulsoor	Bangalore North	City Circle	Shivajinagar	Bangalore Central	1.7	7771	35891	35090	21112	20803	-2.20	10.10	East	Shivajinagar	Shivajinagar		
91	Bharathinagar	Bangalore North	City Circle	Shivajinagar	Bangalore Central	0.8	7074	32632	32689	40790	41815	0.20	13.40	East	Shivajinagar	Shivajinagar		
92	Shivajinagar	Bangalore North (Additional)	City Circle	Shivajinagar	Bangalore Central	0.4	7276	35740	37506	89350	87856	4.90	22.00	East	Shivajinagar	Shivajinagar		
93	Vasanthnagar	Bangalore North	City Circle	Shivajinagar	Bangalore Central	3.1	5304	25632	22815	8268	7286	-11.00	-3.40	East	Shivajinagar	Vasanthnagar		
94	Gandhinagar	Bangalore North	City Circle	Gandhi Nagar	Bangalore Central	1.9	6599	35310	31208	18584	16334	-11.60	-3.90	West	Gandhinagar	Gandhinagar		
95	Subhashnagar	Bangalore North	City Circle	Gandhi Nagar	Bangalore Central	1.3	8711	35427	37693	27252	28599	6.40	21.50	West	Gandhinagar	Gandhinagar		
96	Okalipuram	Bangalore North	City Circle	Gandhi Nagar	Bangalore Central	0.8	8693	35875	38110	44844	46279	6.20	16.70	West	Gandhinagar	Gandhinagar		
97	Dayanandanagar	Bangalore North	City Circle	Rajaji Nagar	Bangalore Central	0.4	8253	34595	35721	86488	80035	3.30	14.50	West	Rajajinagar	Srirama Mandir		
98	Prakashnagar	Bangalore North	City Circle	Rajaji Nagar	Bangalore Central	0.6	8276	35465	32913	59108	57730	-7.20	1.20	West	Rajajinagar	Srirama Mandir		
99	Rajajinagar	Bangalore North	City Circle	Rajaji Nagar	Bangalore Central	0.9	8398	33231	33084	36923	38388	-0.40	11.10	West	Rajajinagar	Rajajinagar		
100	Basaveshwaranagar	Bangalore North	City Circle	Rajaji Nagar	Bangalore Central	0.8	7495	27002	30333	33753	36191	12.30	21.90	West	Rajajinagar	Rajajinagar	\	
101	Kamakshipalya	Bangalore North	City Circle	Rajaji Nagar	Bangalore Central	0.9	7482	25742	30051	28602	33135	16.70	27.90	West	Rajajinagar	Rajajinagar		
102	Vrishabhavathi	Bangalore North	City Circle	Mahalakshmi Layout	Bangalore North	1.0	13443	34339	50893	34339	51187	48.20	63.70	West	Mahalakshmi Layout	Nagapura		
103	Kaveripura	Bangalore North	City Circle	Govindraj Nagar	Bangalore South	1.7	14168	35256	53532	20739	32357	51.80	62.90	South	Govindarajanagar	Govindarajanagar		
104	Govindarajanagar	Bangalore North	City Circle	Govindraj Nagar	Bangalore South	0.8	6678	25773	26873	32216	34956	4.30	13.80	South	Govindarajanagar	Govindarajanagar		
105	Agrahara Dasarahalli	Bangalore North	City Circle	Govindraj Nagar	Bangalore South	0.8	7192	26587	28355	33234	35597	5.60	15.30	South	Govindarajanagar	Govindarajanagar		
106	Dr. Rajkumar	Bangalore North	City Circle	Govindraj Nagar	Bangalore South	1.0	6077	24752	24181	24752	24492	-2.30	6.50	South	Govindarajanagar	Govindarajanagar		
107	Shivanagar	Bangalore North	City Circle	Rajaji Nagar	Bangalore Central	0.8	9260	35797	36461	44746	46943	1.30	8.60	West	Rajajinagar	Rajajinagar		
108	Srirama Mandir	Bangalore North	City Circle	Rajaji Nagar	Bangalore Central	1.1	8156	33613	33866	30557	31973	0.80	9.70	West	Rajajinagar	Srirama Mandir		
109	Chickpete	Bangalore North	City Circle	Gandhi Nagar	Bangalore Central	0.7	6842	33698	33292	48140	46929	-1.20	10.60	West	Gandhinagar	Chickpet		
110	Sampangiramanagar	Bangalore North	City Circle	Shivajinagar	Bangalore Central	4.4	6423	33120	27504	7527	6185	-17.00	-7.40	East	Shivajinagar	Vasanthnagar		
111	Shanthalanagar	Bangalore North	City Circle	Shanthinagar	Bangalore Central	4.0	5493	30225	22995	7556	5745	-23.90	-13.90	East	Shanthinagar	Shanthinagar		
112	Domlur	Bangalore North	City Circle	Shanthinagar	Bangalore Central	1.7	7844	34703	30638	20414	17557	-11.70	-4.30	East	Shanthinagar	Domlur		
113	Konena Agrahara	Bangalore South	Begur	C. V. Raman Nagar	Bangalore Central	2.1	10725	29344	38108	13973	17919	29.90	48.00	East	C. V. Raman Nagar	Jeevanabima Nagar		
114	Agaram	Bangalore North (Additional)	City Circle	Shanthinagar	Bangalore Central	11.0	7734	35632	36916	3239	3345	3.60	12.10	East	Shanthinagar	Domlur		
115	Vannarpet	Bangalore North	City Circle	Shanthinagar	Bangalore Central	0.8	8466	35532	37060	44415	48898	4.30	12.50	East	Shanthinagar	Domlur		
116	Neelasandra	Bangalore North	City Circle	Shanthinagar	Bangalore Central	0.5	10743	36279	48534	72558	94287	33.80	46.00	East	Shanthinagar	Shanthinagar		
117	Shanthinagar	Bangalore North	City Circle	Shanthinagar	Bangalore Central	2.7	9465	36426	42095	13491	15494	15.60	24.30	East	Shanthinagar	Shanthinagar		
118	Sudhamanagar	Bangalore North	City Circle	Chickpet	Bangalore South	1.0	5953	32202	28784	32202	28586	-10.60	0.30	South	Chickpet	Kempegowdanagar		
119	Dharmarayaswamy Temple	Bangalore North	City Circle	Chickpet	Bangalore South	1.1	5485	33199	27076	30181	24561	-18.40	-11.10	South	Chickpet	Kempegowdanagar		
120	Cottonpet	Bangalore North	City Circle	Gandhi Nagar	Bangalore Central	0.8	8652	36582	37344	45728	49463	2.10	14.00	West	Gandhinagar	Chickpet		
121	Binnipete	Bangalore North	City Circle	Gandhi Nagar	Bangalore Central	0.8	9061	33946	37354	42433	48081	10.00	24.20	West	Gandhinagar	Chickpet		
122	Kempapura Agrahara	Bangalore North	City Circle	Vijay Nagar	Bangalore South	0.4	10051	33736	40032	84340	113291	18.70	32.30	South	Vijayanagar	Vijayanagar		
123	Vijaynagar	Bangalore North	City Circle	Vijay Nagar	Bangalore South	0.7	9943	36077	40331	51539	55298	11.80	22.70	South	Vijayanagar	Vijayanagar		
124	Hosahalli	Bangalore North	City Circle	Vijay Nagar	Bangalore South	0.9	9068	32103	37347	35670	55298	11.80	22.70	South	Vijayanagar	Vijayanagar		
125	Marenahalli	Bangalore North	City Circle	Govindraj Nagar	Bangalore South	0.7	5423	20068	21171	28669	30709	5.50	15.50	South	Govindarajanagar	Govindarajanagar		
126	Maruthi Mandira	Bangalore North	City Circle	Govindraj Nagar	Bangalore South	0.8	7716	21784	29319	27230	37155	34.60	46.70	South	Govindarajanagar	Chandra Layout		
127	Moodalapalya	Bangalore North	City Circle	Govindraj Nagar	Bangalore South	1.0	11125	24487	43729	24487	45077	78.60	64.60	South	Govindarajanagar	Chandra Layout		
128	Nagarabhavi	Bangalore North	Yeshwanthpura-2	Govindraj Nagar	Bangalore South	1.6	8255	20269	35780	12668	22406	76.50	84.80	South	Govindarajanagar	Chandra Layout		
129	Jnanabharathi	Bangalore South	Kengeri	Rajarajeshwarinagar	Bangalore Rural	11.9	17410	25889	68132	2176	5743	163.20	187.90	Rajarajeshwarinagar	Rajarajeshwarinagar	Rajarajeshwarinagar		
130	Ullalu	Bangalore South	Kengeri	Yeshvanthapura	Bangalore North	8.7	14511	20332	58199	2337	6688	186.20	208.70	Rajarajeshwarinagar	Kengeri	Kengeri		
131	Nayandahalli	Bangalore South	Kengeri	Govindraj Nagar	Bangalore South	2.1	10285	22878	42785	10894	20860	87.00	98.10	South	Govindarajanagar	Chandra Layout		
132	Attiguppe	Bangalore North	City Circle	Vijay Nagar	Bangalore South	1.4	10576	26806	41487	19147	29971	54.80	72.00	South	Vijayanagar	Gali Anjaneya Temple		
133	Hampinagar	Bangalore North	City Circle	Vijay Nagar	Bangalore South	1.1	8456	30355	35113	27595	31659	15.70	25.50	South	Vijayanagar	Gali Anjaneya Temple		
134	Bapujinagar	Bangalore North	City Circle	Vijay Nagar	Bangalore South	0.7	10647	36234	49484	51763	72549	36.60	45.40	South	Vijayanagar	Vijayanagar		
135	Padarayanapura	Bangalore North	City Circle	Chamrajpet	Bangalore Central	0.3	7273	35213	37599	117377	118059	6.80	17.00	West	Chamarajpet	Chamarajpet		
136	Jagjivanram Nagar	Bangalore North	City Circle	Chamrajpet	Bangalore Central	0.6	7751	33758	38639	56263	60762	14.50	22.20	West	Chamarajpet	Jagjivanram Nagar		
137	Rayapuram	Bangalore North	City Circle	Chamrajpet	Bangalore Central	0.4	7549	32949	36039	82373	81770	9.40	26.90	West	Chamarajpet	Jagjivanram Nagar		
138	Chalavadipalya	Bangalore North	City Circle	Chamrajpet	Bangalore Central	0.4	4896	25319	24801	63298	62762	-2.00	5.10	West	Chamarajpet	Jagjivanram Nagar		
139	Krishnarajendra Market	Bangalore North	City Circle	Chamrajpet	Bangalore Central	0.8	5903	28514	29344	35643	36068	2.90	7.60	West	Chamarajpet	Jagjivanram Nagar		
140	Chamarajapet	Bangalore North	City Circle	Chamrajpet	Bangalore Central	1.0	7500	33398	32213	33398	30976	-3.50	5.30	West	Chamarajpet	Chamarajpet		
141	Azadnagar	Bangalore North	City Circle	Chamrajpet	Bangalore Central	0.7	9246	35741	38825	51059	57539	8.60	20.30	West	Chamarajpet	Chamarajpet		
142	Sunkenahalli	Bangalore North	City Circle	Chickpet	Bangalore South	1.5	8643	36158	34666	24105	23137	4.10	3.40	South	Chickpet	Kempegowdanagar		
143	Visvesvarapuram	Bangalore North	City Circle	Chickpet	Bangalore South	2.5	7361	36093	32462	14437	13186	-10.10	-2.50	South	Chickpet	Kempegowdanagar		
144	Siddapura	Bangalore North	City Circle	Chickpet	Bangalore South	0.7	7396	32194	34879	45991	52299	8.30	14.60	South	Chickpet	Hombegowdanagar		
145	Hombegowdanagar	Bangalore North	City Circle	Chickpet	Bangalore South	1.4	8948	36455	38309	26039	27202	5.10	16.40	South	Chickpet	Hombegowdanagar		
146	Lakkasandra	Bangalore South	Begur	B.T.M Layout	Bangalore South	1.3	7229	28303	30667	21772	23689	8.40	21.80	South	BTM Layout	BTM Layout		
147	Adugodi	Bangalore South	Begur	B.T.M Layout	Bangalore South	1.6	8236	29945	34299	18716	21559	14.50	26.00	South	BTM Layout	Koramangala		
148	Ejipura	Bangalore South	Begur	B.T.M Layout	Bangalore South	1.9	12575	29105	47004	15318	25093	61.50	84.00	South	BTM Layout	Koramangala		
149	Varthur	Bangalore East	Varthur	Mahadevapura	Bangalore Central	28.3	14256	25067	54625	886	1929	117.90	160.20	Mahadevapura	Mahadevapura	Whitefield		
150	Bellandur	Bangalore East	Varthur	Mahadevapura	Bangalore Central	26.4	22368	20526	80180	778	3041	290.60	374.50	Mahadevapura	Mahadevapura	Marathahalli		
151	Koramangala	Bangalore South	Begur	B.T.M Layout	Bangalore South	3.7	9719	35359	38316	9556	10323	8.40	17.10	South	BTM Layout	Koramangala		
152	Suddaguntepalya	Bangalore South	Begur	B.T.M Layout	Bangalore South	1.7	10933	35910	39997	21124	23063	11.40	31.00	South	BTM Layout	BTM Layout		
153	Jayanagar	Bangalore North	City Circle	Chickpet	Bangalore South	2.5	8427	35963	38151	14385	15288	6.10	17.80	South	Chickpet	Hombegowdanagar		
154	Basavanagudi	Bangalore South	City Circle	Basavanagudi	Bangalore South	1.2	8624	36015	32640	30013	28071	-9.40	-2.70	South	Basavanagudi	Basavanagudi		
155	Hanumanthanagar	Bangalore South	City Circle	Basavanagudi	Bangalore South	1.0	9483	35065	36982	35065	37440	5.50	13.10	South	Basavanagudi	Basavanagudi		
156	Srinagar	Bangalore South	City Circle	Basavanagudi	Bangalore South	0.8	10574	36045	41379	45056	51685	14.80	22.70	South	Basavanagudi	Girinagar		
157	Gali Anjaneya Temple	Bangalore North	City Circle	Vijay Nagar	Bangalore South	1.1	8668	27264	34653	24785	30439	27.10	36.70	South	Vijayanagar	Gali Anjaneya Temple		
158	Deepanjalinagar	Bangalore North	City Circle	Vijay Nagar	Bangalore South	2.1	11676	30924	45928	14726	21980	48.50	59.50	South	Vijayanagar	Gali Anjaneya Temple		
159	Kengeri	Bangalore South	Kengeri	Yeshvanthapura	Bangalore North	5.1	10168	24870	40771	4876	7980	63.90	74.40	Rajarajeshwarinagar	Kengeri	Kengeri		
160	Rajarajeshwarinagar	Bangalore South	Kengeri	Rajarajeshwarinagar	Bangalore Rural	11.1	14408	23282	56897	2097	5112	144.40	160.90	Rajarajeshwarinagar	Rajarajeshwarinagar	Rajarajeshwarinagar		
161	Hosakerehalli	Bangalore South	Uttarahalli	Padmanabhanagar	Bangalore South	1.3	12122	21185	46805	16296	34776	120.90	137.60	South	Padmanabhanagar	Padmanabhanagar		
162	Girinagar	Bangalore South	Uttarahalli	Basavanagudi	Bangalore South	1.8	11180	34912	43195	19396	24537	23.70	33.40	South	Basavanagudi	Girinagar		
163	Kathriguppe	Bangalore South	Uttarahalli	Basavanagudi	Bangalore South	1.1	11997	35736	45572	32487	41071	27.50	35.50	South	Basavanagudi	Girinagar		
164	Vidyapeetha	Bangalore South	Uttarahalli	Basavanagudi	Bangalore South	1.2	11425	34535	43483	28779	35279	25.90	39.20	South	Basavanagudi	Basavanagudi		
165	Ganesh Mandira	Bangalore South	City Circle	Padmanabhanagar	Bangalore South	1.6	6472	23101	25998	14438	15979	12.50	21.00	South	Padmanabhanagar	Padmanabhanagar		
166	Karisandra	Bangalore South	Uttarahalli	Padmanabhanagar	Bangalore South	1.1	6492	30206	27040	27460	24444	-10.50	3.30	South	Padmanabhanagar	Banashankari		
167	Yediyur	Bangalore South	City Circle	Padmanabhanagar	Bangalore South	1.2	8455	34591	32756	28826	26683	-5.30	3.70	South	Padmanabhanagar	Banashankari		
168	Pattabhiramnagar	Bangalore South	City Circle	Jayanagar	Bangalore South	1.7	7163	30989	28353	18229	16438	-8.50	1.60	South	Jayanagar	Jayanagar		
169	Byrasandra	Bangalore South	Uttarahalli	Jayanagar	Bangalore South	0.9	7423	30638	32066	34042	36971	4.70	15.10	South	Jayanagar	Jayanagar		
170	Jayanagar East	Bangalore South	City Circle	Jayanagar	Bangalore South	1.0	7961	30846	33927	30846	32869	10.00	22.50	South	Jayanagar	Jayanagar		
171	Gurappanapalya	Bangalore South	Begur	Jayanagar	Bangalore South	0.7	11517	35828	42624	51183	72068	36.70	53.90	South	Jayanagar	Jayanagar		
172	Madiwala	Bangalore South	Begur	B.T.M Layout	Bangalore South	1.2	11517	35155	42694	29296	36612	21.20	41.30	South	BTM Layout	BTM Layout		
173	Jakkasandra	Bangalore South	Begur	B.T.M Layout	Bangalore South	1.5	9040	24088	33521	16059	22020	39.20	59.70	South	BTM Layout	Koramangala		
174	HSR Layout	Bangalore South	Begur	Bommanahalli	Bangalore South	7.1	16847	24749	63033	3486	8879	154.70	182.90	Bommanahalli	Bommanahalli	Bommanahalli		
175	Bommanahalli	Bangalore South	Begur	Bommanahalli	Bangalore South	1.8	11368	24307	43585	13504	23819	79.30	92.80	Bommanahalli	Bommanahalli	Bommanahalli		
176	BTM Layout	Bangalore South	Begur	B.T.M Layout	Bangalore South	2.1	14540	34436	52250	16398	24688	51.70	77.10	South	BTM Layout	BTM Layout		
177	J. P. Nagar	Bangalore South	Uttarahalli	Jayanagar	Bangalore South	1.8	7566	28508	28846	15838	15915	1.20	14.00	South	Jayanagar	J. P. Nagar		
178	Sarakki	Bangalore South	Uttarahalli	Jayanagar	Bangalore South	1.3	7985	26707	31034	20544	23305	16.20	28.30	South	Jayanagar	J. P. Nagar		
179	Shakambarinagar	Bangalore South	Uttarahalli	Jayanagar	Bangalore South	1.9	6537	23239	25871	12231	13946	11.30	19.80	South	Jayanagar	J. P. Nagar		
180	Banashankari Temple	Bangalore South	City Circle	Padmanabhanagar	Bangalore South	0.7	9461	34022	42171	48603	61696	24.00	32.10	South	Padmanabhanagar	Banashankari		
181	Kumaraswamy Layout	Bangalore South	Uttarahalli	Padmanabhanagar	Bangalore South	1.8	11881	35384	47182	19658	25514	33.30	44.00	South	Padmanabhanagar	Banashankari		
182	Padmanabhanagar	Bangalore South	Uttarahalli	Padmanabhanagar	Bangalore South	1.7	10771	25454	41037	14973	24311	61.20	75.60	South	Padmanabhanagar	Padmanabhanagar		
183	Chikkalasandra	Bangalore South	Uttarahalli	Padmanabhanagar	Bangalore South	1.1	11403	24677	43364	22434	39948	75.70	87.80	South	Padmanabhanagar	Padmanabhanagar		
184	Uttarahalli	Bangalore South	Uttarahalli	Bangalore South	Bangalore Rural	9.9	14675	21845	57209	2207	5759	161.90	176.30	Bommanahalli	South	Uttarahalli		
185	Yelachenahalli	Bangalore South	Uttarahalli	Bangalore South	Bangalore Rural	1.6	11338	28000	46943	17500	29234	67.70	85.70	Bommanahalli	South	Uttarahalli		
186	Jaraganahalli	Bangalore South	Uttarahalli	Bommanahalli	Bangalore South	1.3	9818	23299	38294	17922	29756	64.40	77.20	Bommanahalli	Bommanahalli	Arakere		
187	Puttenahalli	Bangalore South	Uttarahalli	Bommanahalli	Bangalore South	2.9	13230	20544	49207	7084	17137	139.50	171.90	Bommanahalli	Bommanahalli	Arakere		
188	Bilekahalli	Bangalore South	Begur	Bommanahalli	Bangalore South	4.3	13186	22510	49884	5235	11721	121.60	143.90	Bommanahalli	Bommanahalli	Arakere		
189	Hongasandra	Bangalore South	Begur	Bommanahalli	Bangalore South	2.1	18192	23058	68554	10980	32066	197.30	219.60	Bommanahalli	Bommanahalli	Bommanahalli		
190	Mangammanapalya	Bangalore South	Begur	Bommanahalli	Bangalore South	3.5	16903	27391	65890	7826	18956	140.60	162.10	Bommanahalli	Bommanahalli	Bommanahalli		
191	Singasandra	Bangalore South	Begur	Bangalore South	Bangalore Rural	9.7	18214	21410	71004	2207	7283	231.60	241.50	Bommanahalli	South	Begur		
192	Begur	Bangalore South	Begur	Bangalore South	Bangalore Rural	19.0	21322	19287	80037	1015	4216	315.00	389.30	Bommanahalli	South	Begur		
193	Arakere	Bangalore South	Begur	Bommanahalli	Bangalore South	6.6	15272	25003	58355	3788	8810	133.40	157.10	Bommanahalli	Bommanahalli	Arakere		
194	Gottigere	Bangalore South	Uttarahalli	Bangalore South	Bangalore Rural	7.4	13457	21526	51911	2909	7049	141.20	165.20	Bommanahalli	South	Kothanur		
195	Konanakunte	Bangalore South	Uttarahalli	Bangalore South	Bangalore Rural	3.4	14984	20181	57335	5936	16761	184.10	212.90	Bommanahalli	South	Kothanur		
196	Anjanapura	Bangalore South	Uttarahalli	Bangalore South	Bangalore Rural	11.4	11049	21080	45608	1849	3997	116.40	135.10	Bommanahalli	South	Kothanur		
197	Vasanthapura	Bangalore South	Uttarahalli	Bangalore South	Bangalore Rural	5.7	16079	24522	62057	4302	10852	153.10	167.70	Bommanahalli	South	Uttarahalli		
198	Hemmigepura	Bangalore South	Kengeri	Yeshvanthapura	Bangalore North	30.5	12687	24311	50440	797	1652	107.50	138.80	Rajarajeshwarinagar	Kengeri	Kengeri		

== See also ==
- List of wards in Bangalore
- Yelahanka Ward
- 2010 Greater Bengaluru Municipal Corporation election
- 2015 Greater Bengaluru Municipal Corporation election
