= Ramanjaneyanagar =

Locality in Bangalore, India

Coordinates: 12°54′43.45″N 77°32′46.43″E

Ramanjaneyanagar is a locality belonging to the assembly constituency of Bangalore South (No 176) which is the biggest assembly constituency in Bangalore with 3,79,870 voters. This area is also referred to as Sriramanjaneyanagar.

The name 'Ramanjaneya' gains significance due to presence of nearby 'Hanumagiri Betta'.

== Information ==
The name Raamaanjaneyanagar consists of two key words: Rama and Anjaneya. Both these originate from the epic Ramayana.

This locality comprising more than 400 houses is being maintained by Bangalore Development Authority (BDA).

The delimitation exercise to expand Bangalore forming "Bruhat Bengaluru Mahanagara Palike" (BBMP) has resulted in identifying 198 Wards and Raamaananeyanagar area comes under the Chikkalsandra Ward (No 183) as per delimitation. This ward has Uttarahalli (Delimited Ward No. 184) and Padmanabhanagar (Delimited Ward No. 182) as neighbors.

Sri M. Krishnappa represents this assembly constituency as MLA. Mrs Shobha has been elected as the corporator in the BBMP election that took place in 2010.

== Welfare association ==
Citizens of this locality have formed "Raamaanjaneyanagar Residents' Welfare Association" which is actively functioning since 2003 for the development of the neighborhood. The association meets monthly to discuss the issues and welfare of the people of the locality.

There is a website dedicated to this area: Sri Ramanjaneyanagar

Area map can be seen here: Sri Ramanjaneyanagar on Google Maps

Raamaanjaneyanagar locality has KSRTC Layout, AGS Layout, Saarvabhowmanagar and Padmanabhanagar as neighboring localities. This is a peaceful locality with many temples and parks in and around the area and with comparatively low vehicle traffic. Next time when you are zipping around this area, make it a point to visit this area.
