= N. A. Haris =

Indian businessman and politician

Nalapad Ahmed Haris

Member of Karnataka Legislative Assembly
- Incumbent
- Assumed office May 2008
- Preceded by: S. Raghu
- Constituency: Shanthinagar

Personal details
- Born: 11 January 1967 (age 59) Bhadravati, Karnataka
- Party: Indian National Congress
- Occupation: MLA

Nalapad Ahmed Haris (popularly known as N. A. Haris) is an Indian businessman, politician and sports administrator. He is a member of the Indian National Congress and has represented the Shanti Nagar Assembly constituency in the Karnataka Legislative Assembly since 2008. He was formerly working as the Chairman of the Bangalore Metropolitan Transport Corporation.

He was appointed chairman for Bengaluru Development Authority (BDA) on 26 January 2024.

== Early life ==
Nalapad Ahmed Haris was born in 1967 in Bengaluru. His father, N. A. Mohammed, moved from Kasaragod, Kerala to Bhadravati, Karnataka in 1960 to set up a metal scrapping shop. Mohammed later moved to Bengaluru and started working on government construction projects. One of the notable projects was Upper Krishna Project. With the money made in this project, Mohammed established Hotel Bangalore International. In 1978, Mohammed set up the Nalapad Group of Hotels. Haris joined the family business in 1997.

== Nalapad Group ==
Haris played a major role in diversifying Nalapad Group's business into Nalapad Pipes, Nalapad Suraksha, Nalapad Infotech and Nalapad Energy. Haris's family also owns Nalapad International School.

== Political career ==
Through the Nalapad family's business, Haris came in contact with Indian National Congress leader K. J. George, who also hailed from Kerala. In the early 2000s, Haris became a trusted aide of K. J. George and former Kerala Chief Minister Oommen Chandy. This helped him elevate his position within the party.

Aged 41, he was elected as the Member of the Legislative Assembly (MLA) from Shanti Nagar in the 2008 Karnataka Legislative Assembly election. He gained popularity through charitable work, especially through the N A Haris foundation which provided scholarships to underprivileged children and organized job fairs.

He was re-elected in 2013, winning the seat by a margin of 19,000 votes in the 2013 Karnataka assembly elections. He was re-elected in the 2018 Karnataka Legislative Assembly election.

In 2017, Haris' 28-year-old son, Mohammed Nalapad, was appointed the General Secretary of the Bengaluru Youth Congress.

== AIFF ==
On 1 September 2022, Haris was elected as the vice president of the All India Football Federation (AIFF).

== See also ==
- K. J. George
