= Mumtaz Begum (mayor) =

Indian politician

Mumtaz Begum (born 1956) is a former mayor of Bangalore, India. She was Bangalore's

- first Muslim mayor,
- fourth woman mayor,
- 43rd mayor and was elected on 30 November 2005.

She had been elected as a corporator of the Bangalore Mahanagara Palike (BMP)thrice. She represented Shivajinagar Ward, which was part of British Cantonment during the colonial rule. A member of the Indian National Congress party, she was elected as a deputy mayor of Bangalore City Corporation in 1984, when she contested as a candidate of the Janata Party platform.

== Political career ==
Mumtaz Begum was in Janatha Party when she got elected as Corporator for the first time in 1984 and elected as Deputy Mayor in 1984. Thereafter she migrated to the Congress party in 1988 and got elected as Corporator for the second time in 1990.

== Posts Held ==
- 1984 : Deputy Mayor, Bangalore
- 1991–95 : General Secretary, Ladies Wing, Karnataka Pradesh Congress Committee
- 1993–97 : President, Block Congress Committee, Shivajinagar, Bangalore
- 1995–97 : General Secretary, Bangalore City District Congress Committee
- 1997–2002 : General Secretary, Karnataka Pradesh Congress Committee
- 2001 : Chairperson, Standing Committee on Appeals
- 2003 : Member, Standing Committee on Education and Social Justice
- 2002–2005 : Executive Committee Member, Karnataka Pradesh Congress Committee
- 2005–2006: Mayor, Bangalore Mahanagara Palike (BMP)

== World Mayor nominee ==
Mumtaz Begum was in the list of finalists for World Mayor title of 2006, conducted once in two years by City Mayors Foundation, London.
