= M. Krishnappa (politician, born 1953) =

Indian politician

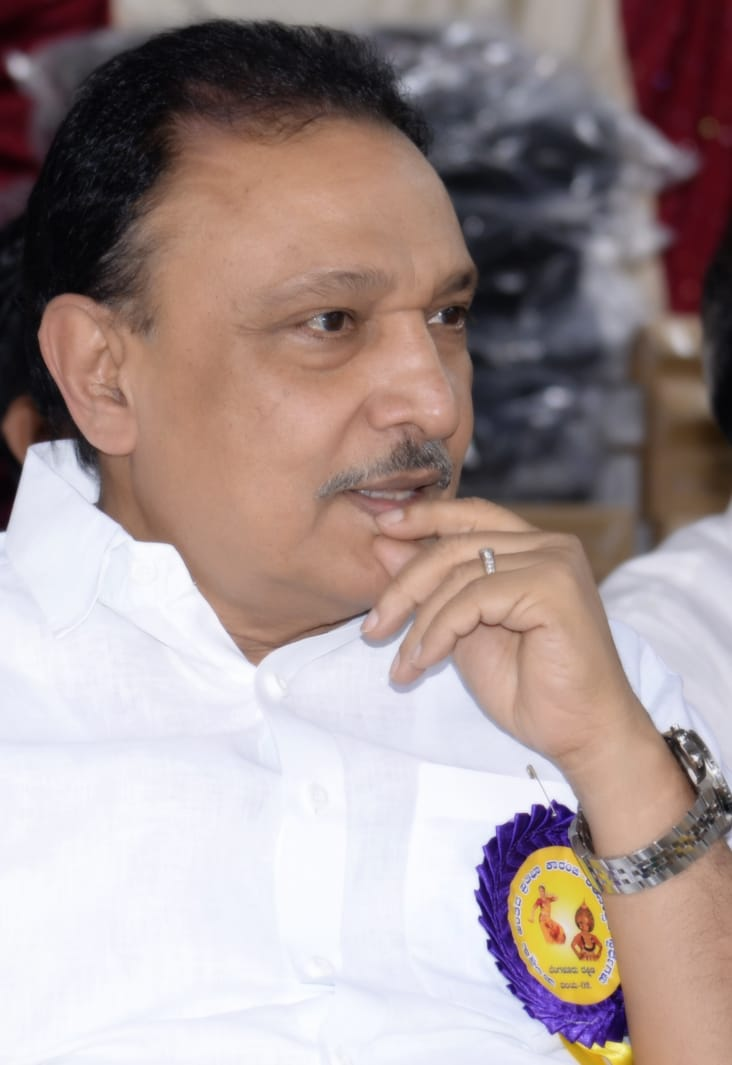

Member of Karnataka Legislative Assembly
- Incumbent
- Assumed office 2008
- Preceded by: Seat established
- Constituency: Vijay Nagar

Minister of Housing of Karnataka
- In office September 2016 – May 2018
- Preceded by: M. H. Ambareesh
- Succeeded by: U. T. Khader

Member of the Karnataka Legislative Council
- In office 2000–2006

Personal details
- Born: 16 April 1953 (age 73) Bengaluru
- Party: Indian National Congress
- Children: Priya Krishna; Pradeep Krishnappa
- Occupation: Agriculturist
- Profession: Businessman
- Website: www.mkrishnappa.com

Muniswamappa Krishnappa is an Indian politician from the state of Karnataka. He is currently serving as member of Karnataka Legislative Assembly representing Vijay Nagar.

== Early life ==
He is the son of Muniswamappa. He earned a B. Sc. Graduation in 1973 from Sri Jagadguru Renukacharya College, affiliated with Bangalore University. He was a Senate Member at Rajiv Gandhi the University of Health Science, Karnataka. Before entering politics, he worked in real estate and land development. He is an ex-member of the Southern Railway Board Committee and Bangalore Telecommunications District Advisory Committee.

== Career ==
He served as a member of Karnataka Legislative Council from 2000 to 2006. He entered the political arena through Indian National Congress and contested as Indian National Congress candidate for Bangalore South Parliament Constituency in the 2004 General Elections.

He is an All India Congress Committee (AICC) Member and KPCC Treasurer.

In 2008 he was appointed Member of Karnataka Legislative Assembly for Vijayanagar Constituency, Bangalore. He is serving as MLA for third consecutive term from Vijayanagar Assembly Constituency.

He served as the Minister of Housing in Government of Karnataka and was also appointed Mandya District In-Charge minister in October 2016, preceded by Sandalwood film star turned politician M. H. Ambareesh. He proposed the One Lakh Housing Scheme as Minister for Housing under Siddaramaiah as Chief Minister of Karnataka.

He represents the Vijay Nagar assembly constituency, located in south Bangalore as a member of Indian National Congress.
