= Rajarajeshwarinagar Assembly constituency =

Legislative Assembly constituency in Karnataka, India

Coordinates: 12.919°N 77.516°E

Rajarajeshwari Nagar
- Constituency No. 154 for the Karnataka Legislative Assembly

Constituency details
- Country: India
- Region: South India
- State: Karnataka
- District: Bangalore Urban
- Lok Sabha constituency: Bangalore Rural
- Established: 2008
- Total electors: 485,815 (2023)
- Reservation: None

Member of Legislative Assembly
- 16th Karnataka Legislative Assembly
- Incumbent Munirathna
- Party: Bharatiya Janata Party
- Elected year: 2023
- Preceded by: M. Srinivas

Rajarajeshwari Nagar Assembly constituency, also known as RR Nagar, is one of the 224 constituencies in the Karnataka Legislative Assembly of the State of Karnataka, India. It is located within the Bangalore Rural Lok Sabha constituency.

== Members of the Legislative Assembly ==
| Election | Member | Party |
|---|---|---|
| 2008 | M. Srinivas | Bharatiya Janata Party |
| 2013 | Munirathna | Indian National Congress |
| 2018 | Munirathna | Indian National Congress |
| 2020^ (Note: Disqualified by the Hon'ble Speaker under the 10th Schedule of the Constitution with effect from 28/07/2019) | Munirathna | Bharatiya Janata Party |
| 2023 | Munirathna | Bharatiya Janata Party |

== Election results ==
=== Assembly Election 2023 ===
2023 Karnataka Legislative Assembly election : Rajarajeshwarinagar
| Party | Candidate | Votes | % | ±% |
|---|---|---|---|---|
| BJP | Munirathna | 127,980 | 48.72% | ▼12.15 |
| INC | H. Kusuma | 116,138 | 44.21% | ▲11.42 |
| JD(S) | Dr. V. Narayana Swamy | 7,795 | 2.97% | ▼1.99 |
| UPP | M. Manjunatha | 4,118 | 1.57% | New |
| NOTA | None of the above | 2,996 | 1.14% | ▼0.07 |
| Margin of victory | | 11,842 | 4.51% | ▼23.57 |
| Turnout | | 263,030 | 54.14% | ▲8.83 |
| Total valid votes | | 262,701 | | |
| Registered electors | | 485,815 | | ▲5.10 |
| BJP hold | | Swing | ▼12.15 | |

=== Assembly By-election 2020 ===
2020 Karnataka Legislative Assembly by-election : Rajarajeshwarinagar
| Party | Candidate | Votes | % | ±% |
|---|---|---|---|---|
| BJP | Munirathna | 125,990 | 60.87% | ▲28.67 |
| INC | H. Kusuma | 67,877 | 32.79% | ▼9.35 |
| JD(S) | V. Krishnamurthy | 10,269 | 4.96% | ▼18.58 |
| NOTA | None of the above | 2,497 | 1.21% | ▲0.15 |
| Margin of victory | | 58,113 | 28.08% | ▲18.14 |
| Turnout | | 209,423 | 45.31% | ▼9.07 |
| Total valid votes | | 206,991 | | |
| Registered electors | | 462,236 | | ▼2.05 |
| BJP gain from INC | | Swing | ▲18.73 | |

=== Assembly Election 2018 ===
2018 Karnataka Legislative Assembly election : Rajarajeshwarinagar
| Party | Candidate | Votes | % | ±% |
|---|---|---|---|---|
| INC | Munirathna | 108,065 | 42.14% | ▲4.98 |
| BJP | P. M. Muniraju Gowda | 82,573 | 32.20% | ▲5.68 |
| JD(S) | G. H. Ramachandra | 60,360 | 23.54% | ▼3.78 |
| NOTA | None of the above | 2,724 | 1.06% | New |
| Margin of victory | | 25,492 | 9.94% | ▲0.10 |
| Turnout | | 256,636 | 54.38% | ▼2.44 |
| Total valid votes | | 256,446 | | |
| Registered electors | | 471,900 | | ▲41.07 |
| INC hold | | Swing | ▲4.98 | |

=== Assembly Election 2013 ===
2013 Karnataka Legislative Assembly election : Rajarajeshwarinagar
| Party | Candidate | Votes | % | ±% |
|---|---|---|---|---|
| INC | Munirathna | 71,064 | 37.16% | ▲8.95 |
| JD(S) | K. L. R. Thimmananjaiah | 52,251 | 27.32% | ▲1.76 |
| BJP | M. Srinivas | 50,726 | 26.52% | ▼15.30 |
| KJP | K. R. Venkatesh Gowda | 5,419 | 2.83% | New |
| JD(U) | Dr. S. V. Priyadharshini Iyer | 1,885 | 0.99% | New |
| Margin of victory | | 18,813 | 9.84% | ▼3.77 |
| Turnout | | 190,075 | 56.82% | ▲9.08 |
| Total valid votes | | 191,258 | | |
| Registered electors | | 334,514 | | ▲10.95 |
| INC gain from BJP | | Swing | ▼4.66 | |

=== Assembly Election 2008 ===
2008 Karnataka Legislative Assembly election : Rajarajeshwarinagar
| Party | Candidate | Votes | % | ±% |
|---|---|---|---|---|
| BJP | M. Srinivas | 60,187 | 41.82% | New |
| INC | P. N. Krishnamurthy | 40,595 | 28.21% | New |
| JD(S) | Hanumantharayappa | 36,785 | 25.56% | New |
| BSP | C. Vishwanath | 1,374 | 0.95% | New |
| Independent | Vijayakumar | 956 | 0.66% | New |
| Margin of victory | | 19,592 | 13.61% | |
| Turnout | | 143,921 | 47.74% | |
| Total valid votes | | 143,910 | | |
| Registered electors | | 301,495 | | |
| BJP win (new seat) | | | | |

== See also ==
- Bangalore Urban district
- List of constituencies of Karnataka Legislative Assembly
