= Rajaji Nagar Assembly constituency =

Constituency of the Karnataka legislative assembly in India

Coordinates: 12.993°N 77.555°E

Rajajinagar
- Constituency No. 165 for the Karnataka Legislative Assembly

Constituency details
- Country: India
- Region: South India
- State: Karnataka
- District: Bangalore Urban
- Lok Sabha constituency: Bangalore Central
- Established: 1976
- Total electors: 207,557 (2023)
- Reservation: None

Member of Legislative Assembly
- 16th Karnataka Legislative Assembly
- Incumbent S. Suresh Kumar
- Party: Bharatiya Janata Party
- Elected year: 2023
- Preceded by: N. L. Narendra Babu

Rajajinagar Assembly constituency is one of the seats in Karnataka Legislative Assembly in India. It is a segment of Bangalore Central Lok Sabha constituency.

== Members of the Legislative Assembly ==
Election	Member	Party
1978	Mallur Ananda Rao	Janata Party
1983	M. S. Krishnan	Communist Party of India
1985	M. S. Krishnan	Communist Party of India
1989	K. Lakkanna	Indian National Congress
1994	S. Suresh Kumar	Bharatiya Janata Party
1999	S. Suresh Kumar	Bharatiya Janata Party
2004	Narendra Babu. N. L	Indian National Congress
2008	S. Suresh Kumar	Bharatiya Janata Party
2013	S. Suresh Kumar	Bharatiya Janata Party
2018	S. Suresh Kumar	Bharatiya Janata Party
2023	S. Suresh Kumar	Bharatiya Janata Party

== Election results ==
=== Assembly Election 2023 ===
2023 Karnataka Legislative Assembly election : Rajaji Nagar
Party	Candidate	Votes	%	±%
BJP	S. Suresh Kumar	58,624	49.60	▲2.74
INC	Puttanna	50,564	42.78	▲3.79
JD(S)	Dr. Anjanappa. T. H	4,081	3.45	▼7.91
NOTA	None of the above	1,700	1.44	▼0.17
UPP	Mohan Kumar. K	1,213	1.03	New
Margin of victory		8,060	6.82	▼1.05
Turnout		118,262	56.98	▲0.07
Total valid votes		118,187		
Registered electors		207,557		▼1.69
BJP hold		Swing	▲2.74	

=== Assembly Election 2018 ===
2018 Karnataka Legislative Assembly election : Rajaji Nagar
Party	Candidate	Votes	%	±%
BJP	S. Suresh Kumar	56,271	46.86	▲16.92
INC	G. Padmavathi	46,818	38.99	▲20.30
JD(S)	H. M. Krishnamurthy	13,637	11.36	▼1.44
NOTA	None of the above	1,931	1.61	New
Margin of victory		9,453	7.87	▼3.38
Turnout		120,163	56.91	▼4.32
Total valid votes		120,092		
Registered electors		211,132		▲19.78
BJP hold		Swing	▲16.92	

=== Assembly Election 2013 ===
2013 Karnataka Legislative Assembly election : Rajaji Nagar
Party	Candidate	Votes	%	±%
BJP	S. Suresh Kumar	39,291	36.45	▼21.51
INC	R. Manjula Naidu	24,524	22.75	▼17.57
KJP	Shobha Karandlaje	20,909	15.93	New
JD(S)	S. T. Anand	16,794	12.80	▲5.11
AIADMK	Muniswamy. K	1,660	1.26	▼0.27
LSP	Rupa Rani	880	0.67	New
Margin of victory		14,767	11.25	▼3.94
Turnout		107,919	61.23	▲8.56
Total valid votes		131,237		
Registered electors		176,260		▼3.82
BJP hold		Swing	▼21.51	

=== Assembly Election 2008 ===
2008 Karnataka Legislative Assembly election : Rajaji Nagar
Party	Candidate	Votes	%	±%
BJP	S. Suresh Kumar	49,655	51.45	▲7.43
INC	G. Padmavathi	34,995	36.26	▼10.60
JD(S)	Ananda. M. A	7,422	7.69	▲0.39
AIADMK	Ramaswamy. S. K	1,478	1.53	New
Margin of victory		14,660	15.19	▲12.35
Turnout		96,522	52.67	▲1.76
Total valid votes		96,507		
Registered electors		183,257		▼35.97
BJP gain from INC		Swing	▲4.59	

=== Assembly Election 2004 ===
2004 Karnataka Legislative Assembly election : Rajaji Nagar
Party	Candidate	Votes	%	±%
INC	Narendra Babu. N. L	67,899	46.86	▲30.13
BJP	S. Suresh Kumar	63,777	44.02	▲5.25
JD(S)	Huchappa. J	10,573	7.30	▼7.91
Kannada Nadu Party	Sathish Chandranavadagi	917	0.63	New
Margin of victory		4,122	2.84	▼12.88
Turnout		145,720	50.91	▲0.07
Total valid votes		144,897		
Registered electors		286,222		▲5.34
INC gain from BJP		Swing	▲8.09	

=== Assembly Election 1999 ===
1999 Karnataka Legislative Assembly election : Rajaji Nagar
Party	Candidate	Votes	%	±%
BJP	S. Suresh Kumar	53,554	38.77	▼8.75
Independent	Narendra Babu. N. L	31,839	23.05	New
INC	Vasanthi Shivanna	23,107	16.73	▲1.69
JD(S)	Huchappa. J	21,005	15.21	New
CPI	Ananthasubbarao. H. V	3,309	2.40	New
Independent	Narendra Babu. K. A	1,197	0.87	New
Independent	Dhanaraj. M. C	1,096	0.79	New
Margin of victory		21,715	15.72	▲1.93
Turnout		138,127	50.84	▼8.35
Total valid votes		138,127		
Registered electors		271,708		▲12.43
BJP hold		Swing	▼8.75	

=== Assembly Election 1994 ===
1994 Karnataka Legislative Assembly election : Rajaji Nagar
Party	Candidate	Votes	%	±%
BJP	S. Suresh Kumar	67,175	47.52	▲31.72
JD	R. V. Hareesh	47,677	33.73	▲9.61
INC	K. Lakkanna	21,260	15.04	▼22.96
INC	B. S. Paramashivaiah	3,053	2.16	New
Margin of victory		19,498	13.79	▼0.08
Turnout		143,050	59.19	▲1.55
Total valid votes		141,356		
Rejected ballots		1,694	1.18	▼2.63
Registered electors		241,672		▲0.40
BJP gain from INC		Swing	▲9.52	

=== Assembly Election 1989 ===
1989 Karnataka Legislative Assembly election : Rajaji Nagar
Party	Candidate	Votes	%	±%
INC	K. Lakkanna	50,707	38.00	▲7.82
JD	R. V. Hareesh	32,196	24.12	New
BJP	S. Suresh Kumar	21,085	15.80	▼2.05
JP	Y. S. V. Datta	20,287	15.20	New
CPI	M. S. Krishnan	8,096	6.07	▼41.27
Margin of victory		18,511	13.87	▼3.28
Turnout		138,750	57.64	▲4.14
Total valid votes		133,457		
Rejected ballots		5,293	3.81	▲3.01
Registered electors		240,701		▲32.98
INC gain from CPI		Swing	▼9.34	

=== Assembly Election 1985 ===
1985 Karnataka Legislative Assembly election : Rajaji Nagar
Party	Candidate	Votes	%	±%
CPI	M. S. Krishnan	45,477	47.34	▼7.57
INC	S. G. Venkataiah	28,997	30.18	▲11.06
BJP	Ramachandra Gowda	17,144	17.85	▼1.23
LKD	K. M. Somanna	2,661	2.77	▲1.02
Margin of victory		16,480	17.15	▼18.64
Turnout		96,840	53.50	▼9.14
Total valid votes		96,068		
Rejected ballots		772	0.80	▼1.15
Registered electors		181,003		▲12.06
CPI hold		Swing	▼7.57	

=== Assembly Election 1983 ===
1983 Karnataka Legislative Assembly election : Rajaji Nagar
Party	Candidate	Votes	%	±%
CPI	M. S. Krishnan	54,467	54.91	New
INC	H. D. Gangaraj	18,964	19.12	▲17.40
BJP	B. R. Shivappa	18,924	19.08	New
Independent	R. Panduranga	2,739	2.76	New
LKD	Umadevi Shankar Kalliguddi	1,740	1.75	New
Margin of victory		35,503	35.79	▲14.20
Turnout		101,173	62.64	▼4.31
Total valid votes		99,200		
Rejected ballots		1,973	1.95	▲0.06
Registered electors		161,523		▲30.78
CPI gain from JP		Swing	▲2.29	

=== Assembly Election 1978 ===
1978 Karnataka Legislative Assembly election : Rajaji Nagar
Party	Candidate	Votes	%	±%
JP	Mallur Ananda Rao	42,693	52.62	New
INC(I)	B. C. Somasekhar	25,173	31.02	New
Independent	K. Lakkanna	5,382	6.63	New
Independent	M. Chinnappa	2,654	3.27	New
Independent	Mahadeva Banakar Gadigappa	1,459	1.80	New
INC	K. N. Sundarappa	1,396	1.72	New
Independent	S. R. Ramachandra Rao	720	0.89	New
Independent	K. P. Sachindranath	679	0.84	New
Margin of victory		17,520	21.59	
Turnout		82,697	66.95	
Total valid votes		81,138		
Rejected ballots		1,559	1.89	
Registered electors		123,512		
JP win (new seat)				

== See also ==
- List of constituencies of Karnataka Legislative Assembly
