= Vijay Nagar Assembly constituency =

Constituency of the Karnataka legislative assembly in India

Coordinates: 12.97°N 77.53°E

Vijayanagar
- Constituency No. 167 for the Karnataka Legislative Assembly

Constituency details
- Country: India
- Region: South India
- State: Karnataka
- District: Bangalore Urban
- Lok Sabha constituency: Bangalore South
- Established: 2008
- Total electors: 305,856 (2023)
- Reservation: None

Member of Legislative Assembly
- 16th Karnataka Legislative Assembly
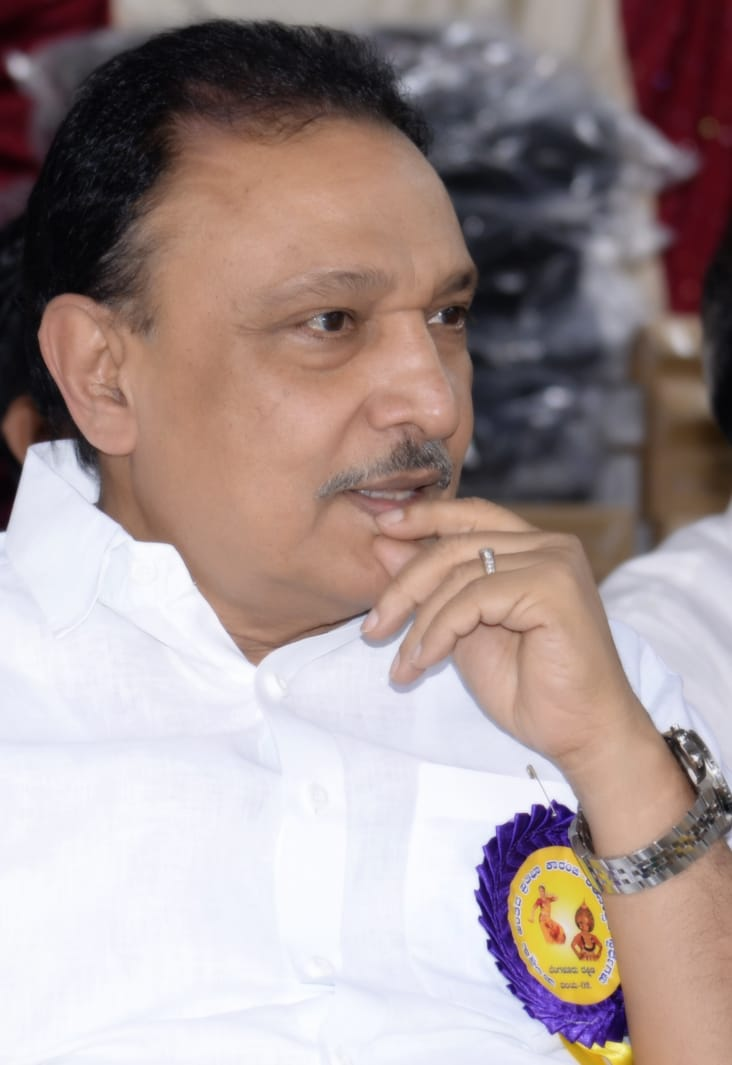
- Incumbent M. Krishnappa
- Party: Indian National Congress
- Elected year: 2023

Vijayanagar Assembly constituency is one of the 224 constituencies in the Karnataka Legislative Assembly of Karnataka, a southern state of India. It is also part of Bangalore South Lok Sabha constituency. As of 2023, it is represented by M. Krishnappa of the Indian National Congress party.

== Members of the Legislative Assembly ==
Election	Member	Party
2008	M. Krishnappa	Indian National Congress
2013	M. Krishnappa	Indian National Congress
2018	M. Krishnappa	Indian National Congress
2023	M. Krishnappa	Indian National Congress

== Election results ==
=== Assembly Election 2023 ===
2023 Karnataka Legislative Assembly election : Vijay Nagar
Party	Candidate	Votes	%	±%
INC	M. Krishnappa	80,157	50.50%	▲3.60
BJP	H. Ravindra	72,833	45.89%	▲0.76
UPP	N. Manjunath	1,706	1.07%	New
NOTA	None of the above	1,640	1.03%	▼0.23
Margin of victory		7,324	4.61%	▲2.84
Turnout		158,942	51.97%	▲1.89
Total valid votes		158,713		
Registered electors		305,856		▼2.11
INC hold		Swing	▲3.60	

=== Assembly Election 2018 ===
2018 Karnataka Legislative Assembly election : Vijay Nagar
Party	Candidate	Votes	%	±%
INC	M. Krishnappa	73,353	46.90%	▼24.51
BJP	H. Ravindra	70,578	45.13%	▲4.04
JD(S)	Paramashiva. N. E	8,174	5.23%	▲1.28
NOTA	None of the above	1,967	1.26%	New
Margin of victory		2,775	1.77%	▼28.54
Turnout		156,460	50.08%	▼6.39
Total valid votes		156,404		
Registered electors		312,449		▲32.40
INC hold		Swing	▼24.51	

=== Assembly Election 2013 ===
2013 Karnataka Legislative Assembly election : Vijay Nagar
Party	Candidate	Votes	%	±%
INC	M. Krishnappa	76,891	71.41%	▲6.98
BJP	V. Somanna	44,249	41.09%	▲11.98
JD(S)	B. S. Kanyakumari	4,253	3.95%	▼0.50
KJP	B. S. Vagesh Prasad	1,791	1.66%	New
Independent	M. Mukunda	819	0.76%	New
Margin of victory		32,642	30.31%	▼5.01
Turnout		133,256	56.47%	▲13.19
Total valid votes		107,679		
Registered electors		235,986		▼6.83
INC hold		Swing	▲6.98	

=== Assembly Election 2008 ===
2008 Karnataka Legislative Assembly election : Vijay Nagar
Party	Candidate	Votes	%	±%
INC	M. Krishnappa	70,457	64.43%	New
BJP	Pramila Nesargi	31,832	29.11%	New
JD(S)	Indira Jayaram	4,870	4.45%	New
Independent	M. N. Sriram	766	0.70%	New
Margin of victory		38,625	35.32%	
Turnout		109,616	43.28%	
Total valid votes		109,358		
Registered electors		253,293		
INC win (new seat)				

== See also ==
- Bangalore Urban district
- List of constituencies of Karnataka Legislative Assembly
