= Chickpet Assembly constituency =

Legislative Assembly constituency in Karnataka, India

Coordinates: 12.971°N 77.576°E

Chikkapete
- Constituency No. 169 for the Karnataka Legislative Assembly

Constituency details
- Country: India
- Region: South India
- State: Karnataka
- District: Bangalore Urban
- Lok Sabha constituency: Bangalore South
- Established: 1956
- Total electors: 221,216 (2023)
- Reservation: None

Member of Legislative Assembly
- 16th Karnataka Legislative Assembly
- Incumbent Uday Garudachar
- Party: Bharatiya Janata Party
- Elected year: 2023
- Preceded by: R. V. Devaraj

Chikkapete Assembly constituency is one of the 224 constituencies in the Karnataka Legislative Assembly of Karnataka, a southern state of India. It is also part of Bangalore South Lok Sabha constituency.

== Members of the Legislative Assembly ==
Election	Member	Party
1957	G. E. Hoover	Independent politician
1962	Y. Ramachandra	Indian National Congress
1967	Perikal. M. Mallappa	Independent politician
1972	K. M. Naganna	Janata Paksha Party
1978	A. Lakshmisagar	Janata Party
1983	A. Lakshmisagar	Janata Party
1985	A. Lakshmisagar	Janata Party
1989	Perikal. M. Mallappa	Indian National Congress
1994	Dr. Jeevaraj Alva	Bharatiya Janata Party
1996 By-election (Note: Due to resignation of Dr. Jeevaraj Alva)	P. S. Prakash	Janata Dal
1999	P. C. Mohan	Bharatiya Janata Party
2004	P. C. Mohan	Bharatiya Janata Party
2008	Dr. D. Hemachandra Sagar	Bharatiya Janata Party
2013	R. V. Devraj	Indian National Congress
2018	Uday Garudachar	Bharatiya Janata Party
2023	Uday Garudachar	Bharatiya Janata Party

== Election results ==
=== Assembly Election 2023 ===
2023 Karnataka Legislative Assembly election : Chickpet
Party	Candidate	Votes	%	±%
BJP	Uday Garudachar	57,299	44.48	▲0.02
INC	R. V. Devraj	45,186	35.07	▼3.23
Independent	K. G. F. Babu @ Yousuf Shariff	20,931	16.25	New
JD(S)	Imran Pasha	1,588	1.23	▼3.65
NOTA	None of the above	1,287	1.00	▼0.04
Margin of victory		12,113	9.40	▲3.25
Turnout		129,137	58.38	▲0.71
Total valid votes		128,828		
Registered electors		221,216		▼1.10
BJP hold		Swing	▲0.02	

=== Assembly Election 2018 ===
2018 Karnataka Legislative Assembly election : Chickpet
Party	Candidate	Votes	%	±%
BJP	Uday Garudachar	57,312	44.46	▲13.92
INC	R. V. Devraj	49,378	38.30	▼4.84
SDPI	Mujahid Pasha. A	11,700	9.08	▲4.43
JD(S)	Dr. D. Hemachandra Sagar	6,286	4.88	▼18.64
NOTA	None of the above	1,340	1.04	New
Margin of victory		7,934	6.15	▼6.45
Turnout		128,993	57.67	▼0.31
Total valid votes		128,920		
Registered electors		223,686		▲19.17
BJP gain from INC		Swing	▲1.32	

=== Assembly Election 2013 ===
2013 Karnataka Legislative Assembly election : Chickpet
Party	Candidate	Votes	%	±%
INC	R. V. Devraj	44,714	43.14	▲10.19
BJP	P. S. Prakash	31,655	30.54	▼9.69
JD(S)	M. C. Narayana Gowda	24,382	23.52	▼0.13
SDPI	Mujahid Pasha. A	4,821	4.65	New
KJP	Khamar Taj	953	0.92	New
Margin of victory		13,059	12.60	▲5.32
Turnout		108,832	57.98	▲10.92
Total valid votes		103,647		
Registered electors		187,711		▼11.72
INC gain from BJP		Swing	▲2.91	

=== Assembly Election 2008 ===
2008 Karnataka Legislative Assembly election : Chickpet
Party	Candidate	Votes	%	±%
BJP	Dr. D. Hemachandra Sagar	40,252	40.23	▼6.87
INC	R. V. Devraj	32,971	32.95	▼9.23
JD(S)	B. Z. Muzammil Ahmed Khan	23,662	23.65	▲18.40
Rashtriya Hindustan Sena Karnataka	Narendra Kumar Jain	640	0.64	New
BSP	L. R. Ananth	619	0.62	New
Margin of victory		7,281	7.28	▲2.36
Turnout		100,057	47.06	▼3.12
Total valid votes		100,057		
Registered electors		212,620		▲134.77
BJP hold		Swing	▼6.87	

=== Assembly Election 2004 ===
2004 Karnataka Legislative Assembly election : Chickpet
Party	Candidate	Votes	%	±%
BJP	P. C. Mohan	21,404	47.10	▲7.84
INC	Sathya Narayana Swamy. M	19,167	42.18	▲13.56
JD(S)	Perikal. M. Mallappa	2,384	5.25	▲1.89
Independent	Padma. K	973	2.14	New
Independent	Narsingh Patel. D	360	0.79	New
Independent	Saifuddin Khan	309	0.68	New
Margin of victory		2,237	4.92	▼5.71
Turnout		45,445	50.18	▼8.75
Total valid votes		45,445		
Registered electors		90,564		▲1.52
BJP hold		Swing	▲7.84	

=== Assembly Election 1999 ===
1999 Karnataka Legislative Assembly election : Chickpet
Party	Candidate	Votes	%	±%
BJP	P. C. Mohan	20,636	39.26	▲22.38
INC	D. P. Sharma	15,047	28.62	▲2.33
JD(U)	P. S. Prakash	11,628	22.12	New
AIADMK	Thangavelu	1,857	3.53	New
JD(S)	L. Kuppaswamy	1,766	3.36	New
Independent	Munirathnam	574	1.09	New
Independent	D. Mahendran	446	0.85	New
Margin of victory		5,589	10.63	▲7.28
Turnout		52,567	58.93	▼3.32
Total valid votes		52,567		
Registered electors		89,207		▲9.55
BJP gain from JD		Swing	▲9.62	

=== Assembly By-election 1996 ===
1996 Karnataka Legislative Assembly by-election : Chickpet
Party	Candidate	Votes	%	±%
JD	P. S. Prakash	14,430	29.64	▲8.08
INC	Perikal. M. Mallappa	12,800	26.29	▼0.14
INC	R. V. Devraj	9,691	19.91	▲18.25
BJP	Mahaveer	8,217	16.88	▼11.39
Independent	G. Narayana Kumar	986	2.03	New
Independent	S. Murhty	699	1.44	New
JP	B. R. Srikanth	361	0.74	▲0.22
Margin of victory		1,630	3.35	▲1.51
Turnout		50,692	62.25	▼1.01
Total valid votes		48,680		
Rejected ballots		1,876	3.70	▲1.95
Registered electors		81,434		▼3.12
JD gain from BJP		Swing	▲1.37	

=== Assembly Election 1994 ===
1994 Karnataka Legislative Assembly election : Chickpet
Party	Candidate	Votes	%	±%
BJP	Dr. Jeevaraj Alva	14,761	28.27	▲15.05
INC	Perikal. M. Mallappa	13,801	26.43	▼28.84
JD	P. S. Prakash	11,257	21.56	▲1.47
AIADMK	K. R. Krishna Raju	8,131	15.57	New
Independent	K. Govind	2,355	4.51	New
INC	L. Sridhar	866	1.66	New
Margin of victory		960	1.84	▼33.34
Turnout		53,177	63.26	▲5.18
Total valid votes		52,211		
Rejected ballots		930	1.75	▼1.89
Registered electors		84,060		▼7.70
BJP gain from INC		Swing	▼27.00	

=== Assembly Election 1989 ===
1989 Karnataka Legislative Assembly election : Chickpet
Party	Candidate	Votes	%	±%
INC	Perikal. M. Mallappa	28,167	55.27	▲16.77
JD	Prof. A. Lakshmisagar	10,237	20.09	New
BJP	S. Kailash	6,740	13.22	▲11.91
JP	Uday Garudachar	2,884	5.66	New
Independent	G. K. Satya	1,029	2.02	New
Independent	Subramani	535	1.05	New
Independent	A. Govindaraju	454	0.89	New
Margin of victory		17,930	35.18	▲20.12
Turnout		52,895	58.08	▲7.91
Total valid votes		50,967		
Rejected ballots		1,928	3.64	▲2.61
Registered electors		91,074		▲7.45
INC gain from JP		Swing	▲1.71	

=== Assembly Election 1985 ===
1985 Karnataka Legislative Assembly election : Chickpet
Party	Candidate	Votes	%	±%
JP	A. Lakshmisagar	22,544	53.56	▼3.52
INC	L. R. Ananth	16,206	38.50	▲6.38
LKD	Purushotham	1,237	2.94	New
Independent	Subramani	618	1.47	New
BJP	T. V. Ramaraju	553	1.31	▼3.16
Margin of victory		6,338	15.06	▼9.91
Turnout		42,528	50.17	▼12.64
Total valid votes		42,090		
Rejected ballots		438	1.03	▼1.10
Registered electors		84,763		▲13.91
JP hold		Swing	▼3.52	

=== Assembly Election 1983 ===
1983 Karnataka Legislative Assembly election : Chickpet
Party	Candidate	Votes	%	±%
JP	A. Lakshmisagar	26,113	57.08	▲13.89
INC	M. V. Thiwary	14,692	32.12	▲30.54
BJP	N. Dayanand	2,045	4.47	New
Independent	T. Ponnuswamy	766	1.67	New
Independent	J. Ramaniklal	605	1.32	New
Independent	Srinivas	313	0.68	New
Margin of victory		11,421	24.97	▲14.53
Turnout		46,739	62.81	▼1.96
Total valid votes		45,745		
Rejected ballots		994	2.13	▲0.22
Registered electors		74,410		▲4.94
JP hold		Swing	▲13.89	

=== Assembly Election 1978 ===
1978 Karnataka Legislative Assembly election : Chickpet
Party	Candidate	Votes	%	±%
JP	A. Lakshmisagar	19,459	43.19	New
INC(I)	M. V. Thiwary	14,756	32.75	New
Independent	N. Dasappa	5,462	12.12	New
Independent	Gnanamba Vatal Nagaraj	2,773	6.16	New
INC	R. Shankar	710	1.58	▼29.09
Independent	G. Narayana Kumar	472	1.05	New
Margin of victory		4,703	10.44	▲5.58
Turnout		45,927	64.77	▲17.78
Total valid votes		45,052		
Rejected ballots		875	1.91	▲1.91
Registered electors		70,907		▲29.82
JP gain from Janata Paksha Party		Swing	▲7.66	

=== Assembly Election 1972 ===
1972 Mysore State Legislative Assembly election : Chickpet
Party	Candidate	Votes	%	±%
Janata Paksha Party	K. M. Naganna	8,936	35.53	New
INC	Kalapanda Thimmaiah	7,714	30.67	▲6.51
Independent	Vatal Nagaraj	5,549	22.06	New
Independent	P. Krishna Murthy	1,478	5.88	New
Independent	N. Shankaranarayana	578	2.30	New
Independent	R. Shankar	211	0.84	New
Margin of victory		1,222	4.86	▼9.68
Turnout		25,665	46.99	▼14.02
Total valid votes		25,149		
Registered electors		54,620		▼7.83
Janata Paksha Party gain from Independent		Swing	▼4.45	

=== Assembly Election 1967 ===
1967 Mysore State Legislative Assembly election : Chickpet
Party	Candidate	Votes	%	±%
Independent	Perikal. M. Mallappa	13,884	39.98	New
Independent	K. M. Naganna	8,835	25.44	New
INC	Y. Ramachandra	8,390	24.16	▼20.33
Independent	M. V. Thiwary	3,068	8.84	New
Independent	M. Ramachandra	469	1.35	New
Margin of victory		5,049	14.54	▼3.40
Turnout		36,156	61.01	▲2.67
Total valid votes		34,724		
Registered electors		59,259		▲37.60
Independent gain from INC		Swing	▼4.51	

=== Assembly Election 1962 ===
1962 Mysore State Legislative Assembly election : Chickpet
Party	Candidate	Votes	%	±%
INC	Y. Ramachandra	10,777	44.49	▼3.76
Independent	K. M. Naganna	6,430	26.54	New
Independent	G. E. Hoover	3,775	15.58	New
Independent	K. Thoppalan	1,891	7.81	New
ABJS	Gundaiah Setty	1,353	5.58	New
Margin of victory		4,347	17.94	▲14.44
Turnout		25,124	58.34	▲11.17
Total valid votes		24,226		
Registered electors		43,067		▼0.24
INC gain from Independent		Swing	▼7.26	

=== Assembly Election 1957 ===
1957 Mysore State Legislative Assembly election : Chickpet
Party	Candidate	Votes	%	±%
Independent	G. E. Hoover	10,537	51.75	New
INC	R. Anantharaman	9,825	48.25	New
Margin of victory		712	3.50	
Turnout		20,362	47.17	
Total valid votes		20,362		
Registered electors		43,171		
Independent win (new seat)				

== See also ==
- Bangalore Urban district
- List of constituencies of Karnataka Legislative Assembly
