= Gandhi Nagar, Karnataka Assembly constituency =

Legislative Assembly constituency in Karnataka, India

Coordinates: 12.982°N 77.578°E

Gandhi Nagar
- Constituency No. 164 for the Karnataka Legislative Assembly

Constituency details
- Country: India
- Region: South India
- State: Karnataka
- Division: Bangalore
- District: Bangalore Urban
- Lok Sabha constituency: Bangalore Central
- Established: 1951
- Total electors: 231,449 (2023)
- Reservation: None

Member of Legislative Assembly
- 16th Karnataka Legislative Assembly
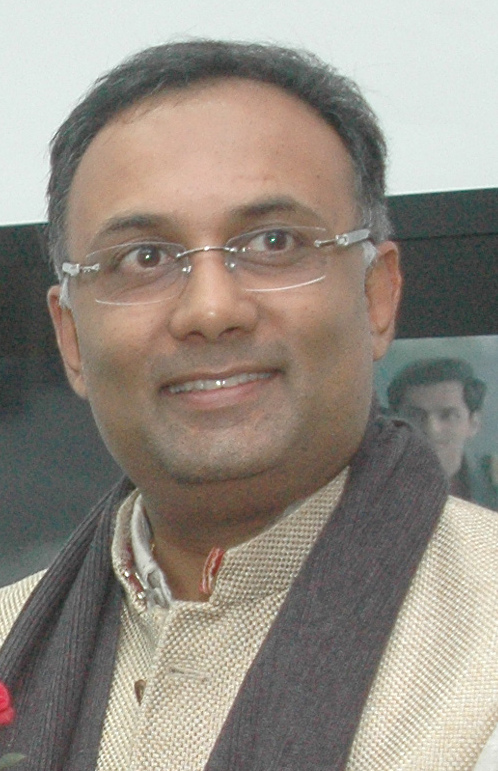
- Incumbent Dinesh Gundurao
- Party: INC
- Alliance: UPA
- Elected year: 2023
- Preceded by: B. Muniyappa

Gandhi Nagar Assembly constituency is one of the 224 constituencies in the Legislative Assembly of Karnataka, a southern state of India. It is also part of Bangalore Central Lok Sabha constituency.

== Members of the Legislative Assembly ==
Election	Member	Party
1952	D. Venkatesh	Indian National Congress
1957	Nagarathnamma Hiremath	Indian National Congress
1962	Nagarathnamma Hiremath	Indian National Congress
1967	Nagarathnamma Hiremath	Indian National Congress
1972	K. Sreeramulu	Indian National Congress
1978	K. Lakshman	Indian National Congress
1983	M. S. Narayana Rao	Janata Party
1985	M. S. Narayana Rao	Janata Party
1989	R. Dayananda Rao	Indian National Congress
1994	B. Muniyappa	All India Anna Dravida Munnetra Kazhagam
1999	Dinesh Gundu Rao	Indian National Congress
2004	Dinesh Gundu Rao	Indian National Congress
2008	Dinesh Gundu Rao	Indian National Congress
2013	Dinesh Gundu Rao	Indian National Congress
2018	Dinesh Gundu Rao	Indian National Congress
2023	Dinesh Gundu Rao	Indian National Congress

== Election results ==
=== Assembly Election 2023 ===
2023 Karnataka Legislative Assembly election : Gandhi Nagar
Party	Candidate	Votes	%	±%
INC	Dinesh Gundu Rao	54,118	40.81%	▲3.47
BJP	A. R. Sapthagiri Gowda	54,013	40.73%	▲11.33
JD(S)	V. Narayanaswamy	12,857	9.70%	▼19.19
Independent	Krisshnaiah Setty Es En Maluru	6,871	5.18%	New
NOTA	None of the above	1,692	1.28%	▼0.36
Margin of victory		105	0.08%	▼7.86
Turnout		132,616	57.30%	▲2.10
Total valid votes		132,609		
Registered electors		231,449		▲0.72
INC hold		Swing	▲3.47	

=== Assembly Election 2018 ===
2018 Karnataka Legislative Assembly election : Gandhi Nagar
Party	Candidate	Votes	%	±%
INC	Dinesh Gundu Rao	47,354	37.34%	▼13.65
BJP	A. R. Sapthagiri Gowda	37,284	29.40%	▼0.62
JD(S)	V. Narayanaswamy	36,635	28.89%	▲22.01
NOTA	None of the above	2,074	1.64%	New
Independent	V. Nagaraj	1,476	1.16%	New
Margin of victory		10,070	7.94%	▼13.03
Turnout		126,860	55.20%	▼2.27
Total valid votes		126,825		
Registered electors		229,803		▲19.10
INC hold		Swing	▼13.65	

=== Assembly Election 2013 ===
2013 Karnataka Legislative Assembly election : Gandhi Nagar
Party	Candidate	Votes	%	±%
INC	Dinesh Gundu Rao	54,968	50.99%	▲9.98
BJP	P. C. Mohan	32,361	30.02%	▼4.07
BSRCP	V. Nagaraj	10,875	10.09%	New
JD(S)	Subhash Bharani	7,418	6.88%	▲2.87
AIADMK	V. A. Pugazhendi	3,197	2.97%	▲1.60
Margin of victory		22,607	20.97%	▲14.05
Turnout		110,878	57.47%	▲13.28
Total valid votes		107,802		
Registered electors		192,944		▼15.11
INC hold		Swing	▲9.98	

=== Assembly Election 2008 ===
2008 Karnataka Legislative Assembly election : Gandhi Nagar
Party	Candidate	Votes	%	±%
INC	Dinesh Gundu Rao	41,188	41.01%	▼25.64
BJP	P. C. Mohan	34,242	34.09%	New
Independent	V. Nagaraj	13,053	13.00%	New
JD(S)	S. Shivappa	4,029	4.01%	▼16.46
BSP	R. Murugan	3,121	3.11%	New
AIADMK	K. R. Krishnaraju	1,371	1.37%	▼3.12
Independent	Ananth. S	953	0.95%	New
Independent	Rangappa	862	0.86%	New
Independent	A. Hamsaraj	614	0.61%	New
Margin of victory		6,946	6.92%	▼39.26
Turnout		100,439	44.19%	▼6.55
Total valid votes		100,434		
Registered electors		227,291		▲88.39
INC hold		Swing	▼25.64	

=== Assembly Election 2004 ===
2004 Karnataka Legislative Assembly election : Gandhi Nagar
Party	Candidate	Votes	%	±%
INC	Dinesh Gundu Rao	40,797	66.65%	▲41.33
JD(S)	V. Nagaraj	12,529	20.47%	▲12.09
Independent	B. Muniyappa	2,986	4.88%	New
AIADMK	Pugazhendi. V	2,746	4.49%	▼7.68
Kannada Nadu Party	Asif Ahmed	866	1.41%	New
Margin of victory		28,268	46.18%	▲44.37
Turnout		61,212	50.74%	▼5.50
Total valid votes		61,212		
Registered electors		120,650		▲9.88
INC hold		Swing	▲41.33	

=== Assembly Election 1999 ===
1999 Karnataka Legislative Assembly election : Gandhi Nagar
Party	Candidate	Votes	%	±%
INC	Dinesh Gundu Rao	15,634	25.32%	▲2.37
Independent	V. Nagaraj	14,519	23.51%	New
AIADMK	Yuvaraj	7,516	12.17%	▼15.08
JD(U)	Srikantamurthy. D. S	6,178	10.01%	New
Independent	B. Muniyappa	5,922	9.59%	New
JD(S)	Govindaraju. L	5,175	8.38%	New
Independent	D. J. Christopher Chakravarthi	2,835	4.59%	New
Independent	Krishnakumar. S. R	1,991	3.22%	New
Independent	Shivakumar. S	868	1.41%	New
Margin of victory		1,115	1.81%	▼2.49
Turnout		61,746	56.24%	▼5.03
Total valid votes		61,746		
Registered electors		109,799		▲6.84
INC gain from AIADMK		Swing	▼1.93	

=== Assembly Election 1994 ===
1994 Karnataka Legislative Assembly election : Gandhi Nagar
Party	Candidate	Votes	%	±%
AIADMK	B. Muniyappa	16,893	27.25%	New
INC	R. Dayananda Rao	14,227	22.95%	▼30.86
BJP	N. L. Narendra Babu	13,139	21.20%	▲18.83
JD	D. S. Srikanta Murthy	9,928	16.02%	▼4.70
INC	A. K. Vasantha	2,915	4.70%	New
CPI(M)	S. Suryanarayana Rao	1,803	2.91%	New
JP	M. S. Narayana Rao	1,766	2.85%	New
Independent	C. Balasundaram	397	0.64%	New
Margin of victory		2,666	4.30%	▼28.79
Turnout		62,967	61.27%	▲2.51
Total valid votes		61,989		
Rejected ballots		978	1.55%	▼2.79
Registered electors		102,770		▼5.14
AIADMK gain from INC		Swing	▼26.56	

=== Assembly Election 1989 ===
1989 Karnataka Legislative Assembly election : Gandhi Nagar
Party	Candidate	Votes	%	±%
INC	R. Dayananda Rao	32,767	53.81%	▲22.18
JD	Leeladevi. R. Prasad	12,617	20.72%	New
Independent	K. Annamalai	7,839	12.87%	New
JP	M. S. Narayana Rao	5,335	8.76%	New
BJP	S. Neelakantappa	1,445	2.37%	New
Margin of victory		20,150	33.09%	▲25.60
Turnout		63,662	58.76%	▲2.13
Total valid votes		60,897		
Rejected ballots		2,765	4.34%	▲3.38
Registered electors		108,337		▲14.99
INC gain from JP		Swing	▲14.69	

=== Assembly Election 1985 ===
1985 Karnataka Legislative Assembly election : Gandhi Nagar
Party	Candidate	Votes	%	±%
JP	M. S. Narayana Rao	20,671	39.12%	▼15.57
INC	Bima Raikar	16,715	31.63%	▼5.67
Independent	B. Muniyappa	9,457	17.90%	New
Independent	V. T. Shanmugam	4,505	8.53%	New
LKD	S. M. Shivashankar	548	1.04%	New
Margin of victory		3,956	7.49%	▼9.90
Turnout		53,352	56.63%	▼6.60
Total valid votes		52,839		
Rejected ballots		513	0.96%	▼1.34
Registered electors		94,217		▲11.28
JP hold		Swing	▼15.57	

=== Assembly Election 1983 ===
1983 Karnataka Legislative Assembly election : Gandhi Nagar
Party	Candidate	Votes	%	±%
JP	M. S. Narayana Rao	28,604	54.69%	▲23.87
INC	Hariprasad. B. K	19,511	37.30%	▲36.03
BJP	Subramani	1,795	3.43%	New
Independent	P. M. Thangavelu	711	1.36%	New
IC(S)	Mysore Kumar	393	0.75%	New
Independent	M. B. Ramu	349	0.67%	New
Margin of victory		9,093	17.39%	▲10.96
Turnout		53,532	63.23%	▼3.44
Total valid votes		52,302		
Rejected ballots		1,230	2.30%	▼0.06
Registered electors		84,669		▲11.74
JP gain from INC(I)		Swing	▲17.45	

=== Assembly Election 1978 ===
1978 Karnataka Legislative Assembly election : Gandhi Nagar
Party	Candidate	Votes	%	±%
INC(I)	K. Lakshman	18,372	37.24%	New
JP	M. R. Jayaram	15,202	30.82%	New
Independent	Sundar	9,318	18.89%	New
Independent	S. N. Narayana	3,100	6.28%	New
Independent	T. P. Prasanna Kumar	1,004	2.04%	New
Independent	Chindananda Ullal	690	1.40%	New
INC	Bima Raikar	625	1.27%	▼32.99
Independent	B. Rangaiah	357	0.72%	New
Margin of victory		3,170	6.43%	▲3.02
Turnout		50,521	66.67%	▲13.70
Total valid votes		49,329		
Rejected ballots		1,192	2.36%	▲2.36
Registered electors		75,773		▲4.53
INC(I) gain from INC		Swing	▲2.98	

=== Assembly Election 1972 ===
1972 Mysore State Legislative Assembly election : Gandhi Nagar
Party	Candidate	Votes	%	±%
INC	K. Sreeramulu	12,812	34.26%	▼0.46
Independent	S. E. Venugopal	11,535	30.84%	New
INC(O)	N. Ramu	4,972	13.29%	New
ABJS	Ramachandra Gowda	4,427	11.84%	New
Independent	B. Ramakrishna	2,473	6.61%	New
CPI(M)	A. Nagesha Rao	1,182	3.16%	▼6.27
Margin of victory		1,277	3.41%	▼3.75
Turnout		38,398	52.97%	▲1.07
Total valid votes		37,401		
Registered electors		72,489		▲6.13
INC hold		Swing	▼0.46	

=== Assembly Election 1967 ===
1967 Mysore State Legislative Assembly election : Gandhi Nagar
Party	Candidate	Votes	%	±%
INC	Nagarathnamma Hiremath	11,638	34.72%	▼13.95
Independent	S. V. Pathi	9,238	27.56%	New
Independent	S. V. K. Rajan	3,838	11.45%	New
CPI(M)	K. Vajravelu	3,161	9.43%	New
Independent	K. Nanjiah	1,631	4.87%	New
Independent	U. M. A. Gowda	1,555	4.64%	New
Independent	B. S. Gurumurthiah	829	2.47%	New
Independent	K. B. Purushotham	647	1.93%	New
Independent	S. Veeranna	338	1.01%	New
Margin of victory		2,400	7.16%	▼15.06
Turnout		35,453	51.90%	▲0.14
Total valid votes		33,524		
Registered electors		68,305		▲26.86
INC hold		Swing	▼13.95	

=== Assembly Election 1962 ===
1962 Mysore State Legislative Assembly election : Gandhi Nagar
Party	Candidate	Votes	%	±%
INC	Nagarathnamma Hiremath	12,958	48.67%	▼14.14
Independent	H. L. Nanjappa	7,041	26.45%	New
DMK	Nateshan	2,774	10.42%	New
CPI	M. C. Narasimhan	1,705	6.40%	▼8.10
SWA	M. S. Moses	1,178	4.42%	New
ABJS	K. Sriranganathan	497	1.87%	New
Independent	V. M. Nagaraju	471	1.77%	New
Margin of victory		5,917	22.22%	▼17.89
Turnout		27,872	51.76%	▲9.72
Total valid votes		26,624		
Registered electors		53,844		▲12.13
INC hold		Swing	▼14.14	

=== Assembly Election 1957 ===
1957 Mysore State Legislative Assembly election : Gandhi Nagar
Party	Candidate	Votes	%	±%
INC	Nagarathnamma Hiremath	12,679	62.81%	▲2.52
Independent	J. Lingaiah	4,581	22.69%	New
CPI	S. Suryanarayana Rao	2,927	14.50%	New
Margin of victory		8,098	40.11%	▲0.46
Turnout		20,187	42.04%	▼11.83
Total valid votes		20,187		
Registered electors		48,020		▲19.56
INC hold		Swing	▲2.52	

=== Assembly Election 1952 ===
1952 Mysore State Legislative Assembly election : Gandhi Nagar
Party	Candidate	Votes	%	±%
INC	D. Venkatesh	13,045	60.29%	New
KMPP	Y. V. Sreenivasamurthy	4,467	20.65%	New
Independent	Rangappa	2,121	9.80%	New
Independent	B. H. Sanjeevappa	1,240	5.73%	New
ABJS	G. Paramasiviah	763	3.53%	New
Margin of victory		8,578	39.65%	
Turnout		21,636	53.87%	
Total valid votes		21,636		
Registered electors		40,165		
INC win (new seat)				

== See also ==
- Bangalore Urban district
- List of constituencies of the Karnataka Legislative Assembly
