= Shanti Nagar Assembly constituency =

Legislative Assembly constituency in Karnataka, India

Coordinates: 12.96°N 77.60°E

Shanti Nagar
- Constituency No. 163 for the Karnataka Legislative Assembly

Constituency details
- Country: India
- Region: South India
- State: Karnataka
- District: Bangalore Urban
- Lok Sabha constituency: Bangalore Central
- Established: 1966
- Total electors: 220,880 (2023)
- Reservation: None

Member of Legislative Assembly
- 16th Karnataka Legislative Assembly
- Incumbent N. A. Haris
- Party: Indian National Congress
- Elected year: 2023
- Preceded by: S. Raghu

Shanti Nagar Assembly constituency is one of the 224 constituencies in the Karnataka Legislative Assembly of Karnataka, a southern state of India. It is also part of Bangalore Central Lok Sabha constituency. The Prominent leaders of this area are N. A. Haris of Indian National Congress & Former Mayor of Bengaluru City (2019-20), M Goutham Kumar from Bharatiya Janata Party.

== Members of the Legislative Assembly ==
Election	Member	Party
1967	A. Nanjappa	Indian National Congress
1972	K. R. Sreenivasulu Nayudu	Indian National Congress
1978	P. K. Ranganathan	Indian National Congress
1983	P. D. Govinda Raj	Janata Party
1985	C. Kannan	Indian National Congress
1989	M. Muniswamy	Indian National Congress
1994	D. G. Hemavathy	Janata Dal
1999	M. Muniswamy	Indian National Congress
2004	S. Raghu	Bharatiya Janata Party
2008	N. A. Haris	Indian National Congress
2013	N. A. Haris	Indian National Congress
2018	N. A. Haris	Indian National Congress
2023	N. A. Haris	Indian National Congress

== Election results ==
=== Assembly Election 2023 ===
2023 Karnataka Legislative Assembly election : Shanti Nagar
Party	Candidate	Votes	%	±%
INC	N. A. Haris	61,030	50.87%	▲1.45
BJP	K. Shivakumar	53,905	44.93%	▲10.50
AAP	Mathai. K	1,604	1.34%	▼0.85
NOTA	None of the above	1,483	1.24%	▲0.10
JD(S)	H. Manjunath	825	0.69%	▼10.49
Margin of victory		7,125	5.94%	▼9.05
Turnout		120,022	54.34%	▲0.62
Total valid votes		119,970		
Registered electors		220,880		▼2.29
INC hold		Swing	▲1.45	

=== Assembly Election 2018 ===
2018 Karnataka Legislative Assembly election : Shanti Nagar
Party	Candidate	Votes	%	±%
INC	N. A. Haris	60,009	49.42%	▲0.39
BJP	K. Vasudevamurthy	41,804	34.43%	▲24.57
JD(S)	N. R. Sridhar Reddy	13,569	11.18%	▼19.64
AAP	Renuka Vishwanathan	2,658	2.19%	New
NOTA	None of the above	1,386	1.14%	New
Margin of victory		18,205	14.99%	▼3.22
Turnout		121,421	53.72%	▼4.08
Total valid votes		121,420		
Registered electors		226,046		▲25.95
INC hold		Swing	▲0.39	

=== Assembly Election 2013 ===
2013 Karnataka Legislative Assembly election : Shanti Nagar
Party	Candidate	Votes	%	±%
INC	N. A. Haris	54,342	49.03%	▼3.32
JD(S)	K. Vasudevamurthy	34,155	30.82%	▲26.43
BJP	D. Venkateshmurthy	10,930	9.86%	▼25.46
KJP	R. V. Ramesh Yadav	911	0.82%	New
NPP	Prabhu Bosco	873	0.79%	New
Margin of victory		20,187	18.21%	▲1.18
Turnout		103,734	57.80%	▲13.55
Total valid votes		110,828		
Registered electors		179,474		▼2.45
INC hold		Swing	▼3.32	

=== Assembly Election 2008 ===
2008 Karnataka Legislative Assembly election : Shanti Nagar
Party	Candidate	Votes	%	±%
INC	N. A. Haris	42,423	52.35%	▲11.73
BJP	D. U. Mallikarjuna	28,626	35.32%	▼10.01
JD(S)	M. Francis Jackson	3,561	4.39%	▼7.40
BSP	K. P. Narasimharaj	1,295	1.60%	New
AIADMK	V. A. Pugazhendi	1,256	1.55%	New
Independent	M. Muniswamy	1,170	1.44%	New
Independent	K. Rajendra	582	0.72%	New
Independent	Prabhu Bosco	496	0.61%	New
Margin of victory		13,797	17.03%	▲12.32
Turnout		81,420	44.25%	▲1.46
Total valid votes		81,039		
Registered electors		183,981		▲6.56
INC gain from BJP		Swing	▲7.02	

=== Assembly Election 2004 ===
2004 Karnataka Legislative Assembly election : Shanti Nagar
Party	Candidate	Votes	%	±%
BJP	S. Raghu	33,483	45.33%	▲8.85
INC	M. Muniswamy	30,005	40.62%	▼5.27
JD(S)	Sreedharan. B. G	8,707	11.79%	▲8.36
Independent	A. Chandrashekar	565	0.76%	New
Margin of victory		3,478	4.71%	▼4.70
Turnout		73,880	42.79%	▼5.61
Total valid votes		73,870		
Registered electors		172,657		▲7.26
BJP gain from INC		Swing	▼0.56	

=== Assembly Election 1999 ===
1999 Karnataka Legislative Assembly election : Shanti Nagar
Party	Candidate	Votes	%	±%
INC	M. Muniswamy	35,751	45.89%	▲15.64
BJP	S. Raghu	28,418	36.48%	▲14.74
JD(U)	D. G. Hemavathy	9,393	12.06%	New
JD(S)	L. Boraiah	2,674	3.43%	New
Independent	A. Chandrashekar	863	1.11%	New
Independent	D. Vijayakumar	546	0.70%	New
Margin of victory		7,333	9.41%	▲8.37
Turnout		77,910	48.40%	▼1.82
Total valid votes		77,910		
Registered electors		160,965		▲14.65
INC gain from JD		Swing	▲14.60	

=== Assembly Election 1994 ===
1994 Karnataka Legislative Assembly election : Shanti Nagar
Party	Candidate	Votes	%	±%
JD	D. G. Hemavathy	21,722	31.29%	▲5.89
INC	M. Muniswamy	21,001	30.25%	▼30.91
BJP	C. Shivaram	15,092	21.74%	▲20.06
Independent	C. Kannan	8,185	11.79%	New
JP	Chinnaiah	1,314	1.89%	New
INC	Archana	700	1.01%	New
Independent	V. Thambideva	507	0.73%	New
Margin of victory		721	1.04%	▼34.72
Turnout		70,513	50.22%	▼2.92
Total valid votes		69,416		
Rejected ballots		1,088	1.54%	▼1.71
Registered electors		140,396		▲3.08
JD gain from INC		Swing	▼29.87	

=== Assembly Election 1989 ===
1989 Karnataka Legislative Assembly election : Shanti Nagar
Party	Candidate	Votes	%	±%
INC	M. Muniswamy	42,828	61.16%	▲20.31
JD	D. G. Hemavathy	17,788	25.40%	New
JP	M. K. Kuppuraj	6,165	8.80%	New
BJP	M. Muddaiah	1,175	1.68%	New
Independent	S. Gurulingappa	976	1.39%	New
AIML	V. Govindaraju	650	0.93%	New
Margin of victory		25,040	35.76%	▲28.66
Turnout		72,379	53.14%	▲3.68
Total valid votes		70,027		
Rejected ballots		2,352	3.25%	▲2.25
Registered electors		136,204		▲35.63
INC hold		Swing	▲20.31	

=== Assembly Election 1985 ===
1985 Karnataka Legislative Assembly election : Shanti Nagar
Party	Candidate	Votes	%	±%
INC	C. Kannan	20,090	40.85%	▲10.00
JP	D. G. Hemavathy	16,598	33.75%	▼26.15
Independent	M. K. Kuppuraj	7,924	16.11%	New
Independent	E. M. Sampangiramaiah	2,722	5.54%	New
Independent	K. Cholan	1,708	3.47%	New
Margin of victory		3,492	7.10%	▼21.95
Turnout		49,672	49.46%	▼7.22
Total valid votes		49,176		
Rejected ballots		496	1.00%	▲0.83
Registered electors		100,424		▲15.75
INC gain from JP		Swing	▼19.05	

=== Assembly Election 1983 ===
1983 Karnataka Legislative Assembly election : Shanti Nagar
Party	Candidate	Votes	%	±%
JP	P. D. Govinda Raj	29,404	59.90%	▲26.75
INC	P. K. Ranganathan	15,142	30.85%	▲28.90
BJP	M. S. Kanagarajan	1,930	3.93%	New
Independent	S. Ramanuja	837	1.71%	New
IC(S)	Rama Murty. N	836	1.70%	New
Independent	Ganesh. K	478	0.97%	New
Independent	L. Krishna Murthy	462	0.94%	New
Margin of victory		14,262	29.05%	▲21.42
Turnout		49,173	56.68%	▼4.95
Total valid votes		49,089		
Rejected ballots		84	0.17%	▼1.80
Registered electors		86,762		▲19.75
JP gain from INC(I)		Swing	▲19.12	

=== Assembly Election 1978 ===
1978 Karnataka Legislative Assembly election : Shanti Nagar
Party	Candidate	Votes	%	±%
INC(I)	P. K. Ranganathan	17,851	40.78%	New
JP	Govindaraja. P. D	14,511	33.15%	New
DMK	M. K. Kuppuraj	5,397	12.33%	New
AIADMK	Pandyan. M	4,105	9.38%	New
Independent	Kempamma. T	943	2.15%	New
INC	Dharmalingam. A. M	855	1.95%	▼39.58
Margin of victory		3,340	7.63%	▼3.96
Turnout		44,651	61.63%	▲13.10
Total valid votes		43,771		
Rejected ballots		880	1.97%	▲1.97
Registered electors		72,452		▼0.34
INC(I) gain from INC		Swing	▼0.75	

=== Assembly Election 1972 ===
1972 Mysore State Legislative Assembly election : Shanti Nagar
Party	Candidate	Votes	%	±%
INC	K. R. Sreenivasulu Nayudu	14,346	41.53%	▲8.65
Independent	V. Shivashankara	10,342	29.94%	New
Independent	P. K. Ranganathan	4,892	14.16%	New
INC(O)	A. Nanjappa	4,083	11.82%	New
ABJS	D. Devarajan	712	2.06%	New
Margin of victory		4,004	11.59%	▲10.29
Turnout		35,280	48.53%	▼4.33
Total valid votes		34,540		
Registered electors		72,699		▲7.49
INC hold		Swing	▲8.65	

=== Assembly Election 1967 ===
1967 Mysore State Legislative Assembly election : Shanti Nagar
Party	Candidate	Votes	%	±%
INC	A. Nanjappa	11,345	32.88%	New
Independent	B. Nanjappa	10,898	31.58%	New
Independent	P. K. Ranganathan	6,806	19.72%	New
PSP	A. K. Anatha Krishna	4,770	13.82%	New
Independent	V. K. Reddy	686	1.99%	New
Margin of victory		447	1.30%	
Turnout		35,753	52.86%	
Total valid votes		34,505		
Registered electors		67,633		
INC win (new seat)				

== See also ==
- Bangalore Urban district
- List of constituencies of Karnataka Legislative Assembly
