= 2015 Bruhat Bengaluru Mahanagara Palike election =

2015 election in India

- 22 April 2015

198 of 198 seats in the Bruhat Bengaluru Mahanagara Palike 100 seats needed for a majority
- Registered: 73,28,578 (▲5.04%)
- Turnout: 49.36% (▲5.32%)

	Majority party	Minority party	Third party
Party	BJP	INC	JD(S)
Seats before	111	65	15
Seats won	100	76	14
Seat change	▼11	▲9	▼1
BBMP majority before election
BJP
Elected BBMP majority
BJP

The 2015 Bruhat Bengaluru Mahanagara Palike (Greater Bengaluru City Corporation) election was an election held on 22 April 2015 in all 198 Wards of Bangalore India.

== Background ==
The tenure of the Bruhat Bangalore Mahanagara Palike (BBMP) was scheduled to end on 22 April 2015. A new election was necessary to elect new council members and mayors by that time. The Government of Karnataka intended to trifurcate the BBMP and had not notified the elections until the end of March 2015. On 30 March, the Bharatiya Janata Party (BJP) council members B. Somashekar (Shakambari Nagar Ward) and C. K. Ramamurthy (Pattabhirama Nagar Ward) filed a written petition to conduct elections before the end of the tenure.

The Cabinet approved an amendment bill to constitute three new corporations to replace the BBMP. The Karnataka Municipal Corporation (Amendment) Bill, 2014, was planned to be tabled at the one-day special session of the state legislature on 20 April 2015. The government decided to call the special session to promulgate an ordinance, but it was stalled by Governor Vajubhai Vala, who stated that he was not satisfied with it. Amidst stiff opposition from both the BJP and Janata Dal (Secular), the Karnataka Legislative Assembly passed a bill to trifurcate the BBMP with a voice vote on 20 April. Following this, many pro-Kannada organizations and the Youth wing of the Bharatiya Janata Party protested the trifurcation.

After failing to get the Governor's assent for an ordinance on the trifurcation, a one-day session of the Karnataka legislature was convened to pass the Karnataka Municipal Corporations (Amendment) Bill 2015, which was passed though with vehement opposition.

The division bench of the Karnataka High Court also refused to stay a single bench order to conduct the elections before 30 May. On 24 April, the Karnataka High Court put off elections to the BBMP civic body. Setting aside a single bench order, which directed the state election commission (SEC) to conduct the civic poll by 30 May, a division bench headed by Chief Justice D.H. Waghela and Justice Ram Mohan Reddy told the state government to hold the elections by six months, as per the 74th constitutional amendment. The state government filed a review petition on 7 April, seeking a stay on the March 30 order of Justice B.V. Nagarathna to the SEC for holding the civic poll by 30 May, as its five-year term was ending on 22 April. State Advocate General Ravivarma Kumar assured the bench that the state government would abide by its order and help the SEC to hold the election in 198 wards across the city within six months.

The State government claimed that trifurcation of the BBMP was necessary to deliver better services to the citizens, while the BJP and the Janata Dal (Secular) opposed the move, claiming it was a ploy to postpone polls. G. Kumar Naik took charge as the 61st Commissioner of the BBMP on 20 April, two days after the state government issued an order on superseding the BBMP. The Karnataka Congress government's bill to divide Bengaluru city into three or smaller administrative units was passed by the state legislative assembly on 21 July, after the legislative council, where the BJP opposition had a majority, rejected the bill 20 July.

The passage of the new law was expected to give the Congress government more time to conduct elections to the city council, which had been ordered by the high court and the Supreme Court after the Congress government dissolved the city council in April and took administrative control of the city. The Supreme Court's order brought certainty to the timeline for the BBMP elections after a few months of legal gridlock. The court extended the deadline for the completion of BBMP polls to 28 August. Setting the process for the August 22 election of the BBMP into motion, the commissioner of the BBMP, G. Kumar Naik, issued the notification on 3 August. A calendar of events was released by Naik as an affirmation of the notification, announcing the election dates issued by State Election Commissioner P. N. Srinivasachary on 16 July.

=== Organization ===
A new mayor was elected for a term of one year, and corporators were in office for 5 years.

== Schedule ==
The schedule of the election was announced by the State Election Commission on 16 July 2015. The SEC announced that polling would be held in a single phase on 22 August and that results would be declared on 25 August. It also declared that the provisions of the Model Code of Conduct came into force with immediate effect with the announcement.

Event	Date
Date for Notification of Election	3 August 2015
Last date for filing nominations	10 August 2015
Date for scrutiny of nominations	11 August 2015
Last date for withdrawal of candidatures	13 August 2015
Date of poll	22 August 2015
Date of Repoll wherever necessary	24 August 2015
Date of counting	25 August 2015
Date before which the election shall be completed	26 August 2015

== Candidates ==
Complete list of Candidate contesting in 2015 BBMP Election
Ward number	Ward name	Reservation category	Assembly constituency	Lok Sabha constituency	Indian National Congress	Bharatiya Janata Party	Janata Dal (Secular)	Others	Winner	2010 Winner	2010 Party
1	Kempegowda Ward	Backward Category A (Women)	Yelahanka	Chikballapur	Dhanalakshmi Krishnamurthy	Chandramma	Lavanya N Suresh		Bharatiya Janata Party	Y.N Ashwath	Bharatiya Janata Party
2	Chowdeshwari Ward	General (Women)	Yelahanka	Chikballapur	R Padmavathi	Vanishree Vishwanath	G Nagalakshmi		Indian National Congress	K.V. Yashoda	Bharatiya Janata Party
3	Attur	Scheduled Tribe (Women)	Yelahanka	Chikballapur	Shantha Rajanna	Netra Pallavi	Rathnamma		Bharatiya Janata Party	K.N Geetha ShashiKumar	Bharatiya Janata Party
4	Yelahanka Satellite Town	Backward Category B	Yelahanka	Chikballapur	Subbanna	Satish M	Hanumanthegowda		Bharatiya Janata Party	M. Muniraju	Bharatiya Janata Party
5	Jakkur	General	Byatarayanapura	Bangalore North	Subramani	K V Munindrakumar	Erappa		Bharatiya Janata Party	K.A. Muneedra Kumar	Bharatiya Janata Party
6	Thanisandra	Scheduled Caste (Women)	Byatarayanapura	Bangalore North	Mamatha K M	Savitramma	Chandrakala Venkatesh		Indian National Congress	Lalitha	Janata Dal (Secular)
7	Byatarayanapura	Backward Category A	Byatarayanapura	Bangalore North	P V Manjunath	L Nanjappa	Paramesh K N		Indian National Congress	Indira	Indian National Congress
8	Kodigehalli	General	Byatarayanapura	Bangalore North	Chethan K M	Ashwathnarayana Gowda	Subramanya		Indian National Congress	Ashwath Narayan Gowda	Bharatiya Janata Party
9	Vidyaranyapura	Backward Category A (Women)	Byatarayanapura	Bangalore North	Sudha T T	Kusuma H	Ambika K Mani		Bharatiya Janata Party	K. Nandini	Bharatiya Janata Party
10	Doddabommasandra	General (Women)	Byatarayanapura	Bangalore North	Thejavathi	Jayalakshmi Pillappa	Suma Nagesh		Bharatiya Janata Party	M.E. Pillappa	Bharatiya Janata Party
11	Kuvempunagar	Scheduled Caste	Byatarayanapura	Bangalore North	V Prathibha Rajan	Sriramappa	Nagaraj M		Indian National Congress	K.R. Yashodamma	Independent
12	Shettyhalli	General	Dasarahalli	Bangalore North	K Nagabhushan	K C Venkatesh	A Prakash		Indian National Congress	Sharadamma	Bharatiya Janata Party
13	Mallasandra	General	Dasarahalli	Bangalore North	R Manjunath	N Lokesh	R C Dore		Bharatiya Janata Party	R.P Shashi	Bharatiya Janata Party
14	Bagalagunte	Scheduled Tribe	Dasarahalli	Bangalore North	M Nagaraj	K Narasimha	Ranganath Nayak		Bharatiya Janata Party	B.R Chandrashekar	Bharatiya Janata Party
15	T. Dasarahalli	Backward Category A (Women)	Dasarahalli	Bangalore North	Uma Salma Basheer	Umadevi Nagaraj	Devika Soundarya		Bharatiya Janata Party	Puttamma	Bharatiya Janata Party
16	Jalahalli	Backward Category B	Rajarajeshwarinagar	Bangalore Rural	J N Srinivas Murthy	Rakesh	N Mahesh		Indian National Congress	R. Narayana Swamy	Indian National Congress
17	J. P. Park	General (Women)	Rajarajeshwarinagar	Bangalore Rural	K Sunanda	Mamata K B	Varalakshmi Ganganna		Bharatiya Janata Party	B.R. Nanjundappa	Bharatiya Janata Party
18	Radhakrishna Temple	General	Hebbal	Bangalore North	M Venkatesh	R Krishnadevaraya	M Anand		Janata Dal (Secular)	D. Venkatesha	Bharatiya Janata Party
19	Sanjaynagar	General (Women)	Hebbal	Bangalore North	Sudha Jayasimha	Indira Suhbash	Putta Madamma		Bharatiya Janata Party	N.M Krishnamurthy	Bharatiya Janata Party
20	Ganganagar	General (Women)	Hebbal	Bangalore North	Dr Radha Harish	Pramila V Anand	Haseena Taj		Bharatiya Janata Party	V. Anand	Bharatiya Janata Party
21	Hebbala	General	Hebbal	Bangalore North	Anand Kumar	Jayappa Reddy	Kiran Kumar		Indian National Congress	C.R. Jayappa Reddy	Bharatiya Janata Party
22	Vishwanathnagenahalli	Backward Category A	Hebbal	Bangalore North	V Rajanna	Venkatesh	Rajashekhar N		Janata Dal (Secular)	Munirathnamma	Indian National Congress
23	Nagavara	Backward Category A (Women)	Sarvagnanagar	Bangalore Central	Irshad Begum	Umme Kauser	Uma Ganesh		Indian National Congress	Irshaad Begum	Indian National Congress
24	HBR Layout	Scheduled Caste	Sarvagnanagar	Bangalore Central	P Anand	K Narayanaswami	Hennur Srinivas		Indian National Congress	B Govindaraju	Bharatiya Janata Party
25	Horamavu	Scheduled Caste (Women)	Krishnarajapuram	Bangalore North	Radhamma	N Bharathi Muniraju	Jayapriya		Indian National Congress	Tejaswini N Raju	Bharatiya Janata Party
26	Ramamurthynagar	General (Women)	Krishnarajapuram	Bangalore North	M Shantha	M Padmavati Shrinivas	Padmavathi S		Bharatiya Janata Party	M Revanna	Bharatiya Janata Party
27	Banaswadi	General	Sarvagnanagar	Bangalore Central	B C Prabhakar Reddy	A Kodandareddy	Thayanna Reddy		Bharatiya Janata Party	A. Kodanda Reddy	Bharatiya Janata Party
28	Kammanahalli	Scheduled Caste (Women)	Sarvagnanagar	Bangalore Central	B Kalpana	Munilakshmma	Yuvarani Manjula		Bharatiya Janata Party	M.C. Srinivas	Bharatiya Janata Party
29	Kacharakanahalli	General	Sarvagnanagar	Bangalore Central	J Ashok Reddy (Papayya Reddy)	Padmanabha Reddy	Uncontested		Bharatiya Janata Party	Padmanabh Reddy	Janata Dal (Secular)
30	Kadugondanahalli	Backward Category A	Sarvagnanagar	Bangalore Central	Navsheer Ahmed	Anand	Juheb Ahmed		Indian National Congress	Shaheen Taj	Indian National Congress
31	Kushalnagar	Backward Category A (Women)	Pulakeshinagar	Bangalore North	Noor Jahan Sharief	K Fouzia Tai	Umme Salma		Janata Dal (Secular)	Noor Jahaan	Indian National Congress
32	Kavalbyrasandra	General (Women)	Pulakeshinagar	Bangalore North	H L Kavitha Gowda	Gouramma	Netra Narayan		Janata Dal (Secular)	Y.R. Gowramma	Bharatiya Janata Party
33	Manorayanapalya	General	Hebbal	Bangalore North	Abdul Wajid	Chand Pasha	Ashwak Ahmed		Indian National Congress	Foujiya Begum	Indian National Congress
34	Gangenahalli	Backward Category A	Hebbal	Bangalore North	E B Vijikumar	M Nagaraju	R Hemanth Kumar		Bharatiya Janata Party	M. Nagaraja	Bharatiya Janata Party
35	Aramanenagar	General (Women)	Malleshwaram	Bangalore North	Latha R	Sumangala Keshav	Jayanthi Pai		Bharatiya Janata Party	Dr. M.S Shivaprasad	Bharatiya Janata Party
36	Mathikere	General	Malleshwaram	Bangalore North	K E Harish	Jayprakash	M V Nagaraj		Bharatiya Janata Party	Muniswamy Gowda	Bharatiya Janata Party
37	Yeshwanthpura	Backward Category A	Rajarajeshwarinagar	Bangalore Rural	G K Venkatesh	Shekhar A	Jayakumar		Indian National Congress	Munirathna	Indian National Congress
38	H. M. T.	General (Women)	Rajarajeshwarinagar	Bangalore Rural	S Asha Suresh	Manjula Manjunatha Babu	Veena M		Indian National Congress	Asha Suresh	Indian National Congress
39	Chokkasandra	Backward Category A (Women)	Dasarahalli	Bangalore North	Roopa Jagadish	Sarvamangala Nagaraj	Lakshmamma M Muniswamy		Bharatiya Janata Party	M. Muniswamy	Janata Dal (Secular)
40	Dodda Bidarkallu	Scheduled Tribe	Yeshvanthapura	Bangalore North	Vasudeva S	Malatesh	Gopal R		Indian National Congress	T.A.Gayithree	Janata Dal (Secular)
41	Peenya Industrial Area	General (Women)	Dasarahalli	Bangalore North	Lalitha Thimmanajaiah	Kala Andanappa	Latha Ramesh		Indian National Congress	K.L Thimmananjayya	Independent
42	Lakshmidevinagar	Scheduled Caste	Rajarajeshwarinagar	Bangalore Rural	Velu Nayakar	Makali Paramesh	Ravi Kumar		Indian National Congress	Thimmaraju	Bharatiya Janata Party
43	Nandini Layout	General	Mahalakshmi Layout	Bangalore North	M Nagaraj	K V Rajendrakumar	Siddalingegowda		Bharatiya Janata Party	M Nagaraj	Indian National Congress
44	Marappana Palya	Scheduled Caste	Mahalakshmi Layout	Bangalore North	Anandamurthy	Gopal	Mahadev M		Janata Dal (Secular)	Lakshmi	Janata Dal (Secular)
45	Malleshwaram	General	Malleshwaram	Bangalore North	Dr Rajesh Mannar Naidu	Jaypal N	Suresh Kumar		Bharatiya Janata Party	N. Jayapala	Indian National Congress
46	Jayachamarajendranagar	General	Hebbal	Bangalore North	Govindaraj B	Ganesh Rao Mane	Saleem Pasha		Bharatiya Janata Party	N. Govindraju	Indian National Congress
47	Devarajeevanahalli	General	Pulakeshinagar	Bangalore North	B Sampath Raj	Pramod	Syed Usman		Indian National Congress	Sri.R. Sampath Raj.	Indian National Congress
48	Muneshwaranagar	General (Women)	Pulakeshinagar	Bangalore North	Syed Majid	Kalavathi	Kriya Shailaja		Indian National Congress	S. Kriyaa Shylaja	Janata Dal (Secular)
49	Lingarajapuram	General (Women)	Sarvagnanagar	Bangalore Central	Lavanya Ganesh	Savithri	Dr Rooth Mani		Indian National Congress	Lavanya Ganesh Reddy	Indian National Congress
50	Benniganahalli	Backward Category A (Women)	C. V. Raman Nagar	Bangalore Central	Meenakshi	R Vijayalakshmi Krishna	Muni Nanjamma		Indian National Congress	N. Dayanand	Bharatiya Janata Party
51	Vijinapura	Backward Category A	Krishnarajapuram	Bangalore North	Syed Mastan	S Raju	Abdul Salam		Bharatiya Janata Party	Sugumar (Sugun)	Bharatiya Janata Party
52	Krishnarajapuram	Backward Category A	Krishnarajapuram	Bangalore North	D K Mohan	Poornima Shrinivas	C Devaraj		Bharatiya Janata Party	N.Veeranna	Bharatiya Janata Party
53	Basavanapura	Scheduled Caste	Krishnarajapuram	Bangalore North	B N Jayaprakash	K Sundar Raju	Arun Kumar		Indian National Congress	K Poornima	Indian National Congress
54	Hoodi	Scheduled Caste	Mahadevapura	Bangalore Central	Hariprasad A C	H V Manjunath	M Venkatesh		Indian National Congress	B.A. Basavaraju	Indian National Congress
55	Devasandra	General	Krishnarajapuram	Bangalore North	M N Srikanth	R Manjuladevi Shrinivas	D Raghavendra Gowda		Indian National Congress	R. Manjula Devi	Bharatiya Janata Party
56	A. Narayanapura	Scheduled Caste	Krishnarajapuram	Bangalore North	V Suresh	V C Raju	Lakshmi Murthy		Indian National Congress	Vijaya Prasad	Bharatiya Janata Party
57	C. V. Raman Nagar	Backward Category B (Women)	C. V. Raman Nagar	Bangalore Central	R Manjula Devaraj	Aruna Ravi	Uncontested		Bharatiya Janata Party	M Krishnappa	Bharatiya Janata Party
58	Hosathippasandra	General (Women)	C. V. Raman Nagar	Bangalore Central	Shilpa K S	Sumitra Vijayakumar	Uncontested		Indian National Congress	Sumithra	Bharatiya Janata Party
59	Maruthisevanagar	Backward Category B (Women)	Sarvagnanagar	Bangalore Central	Hanna Bhuvaneshwari	Suma	Vani Ashwath		Indian National Congress	R. Rajendran	Indian National Congress
60	Sagayarapuram	General	Pulakeshinagar	Bangalore North	K C Prabhakar Reddy	Shrikanth Sitaram	Maari Mutthu	V. Elumalai (Independent)	Independent	V. Palaniyammal	Indian National Congress
61	S. K. Garden	General	Pulakeshinagar	Bangalore North	Mohd Zameer Shah	Sunil Kumar	Mahesh Kumar		Indian National Congress	Devikarani Sridhar	Indian National Congress
62	Ramaswamypalya	General (Women)	Shivajinagar	Bangalore Central	Netravati Krishnegowda	Girija Prakesh	Shameena C		Indian National Congress	N. Chandra	Indian National Congress
63	Jayamahal	Backward Category A	Shivajinagar	Bangalore Central	M K Gunashekhar	Balakrishna	Kaleem Pasha		Indian National Congress	Sri.M.K Gunashekar	Indian National Congress
64	Rajamahal Guttahalli	Backward Category A (Women)	Malleshwaram	Bangalore North	Veena Vishwanath	Hemalatha Sathish Seth	Mouseen Jubeen		Bharatiya Janata Party	M. Vijaya Kumari	Bharatiya Janata Party
65	Kadumalleshwara	General	Malleshwaram	Bangalore North	L Nithyananda Prabhu	Manjunatharaju	Suryanarayan Rao N		Bharatiya Janata Party	G.Manjunath Raju	Bharatiya Janata Party
66	Subrahmanyanagar	Backward Category A	Malleshwaram	Bangalore North	H Manjunath	D Shivarajamoorthy	Nagaraju		Indian National Congress	S. Shashikala Kiran	Bharatiya Janata Party
67	Nagapura	General	Mahalakshmi Layout	Bangalore North	N L Mahesh Kumar	S Harish	Badregowda		Janata Dal (Secular)	S.Harish	Bharatiya Janata Party
68	Mahalakshmipuram	General	Mahalakshmi Layout	Bangalore North	S Keshavamurthy	M S Shivanandarnurthy	R Narayana		Indian National Congress	S. Keshavmurthy	Indian National Congress
69	Laggere	Backward Category B (Women)	Rajarajeshwarinagar	Bangalore Rural	Ambujakshi Ravigowda	T S V Gayatri	Manjula Narayanaswamy		Janata Dal (Secular)	Lakshmikanth Reddy	Bharatiya Janata Party
70	Rajagopalanagar	General (Women)	Dasarahalli	Bangalore North	Usha Ravi Gowda	Anitha Suresh	Padmavathi Narasimhamurthy		Janata Dal (Secular)	H.N. Gangadhara	Bharatiya Janata Party
71	Hegganahalli	General (Women)	Dasarahalli	Bangalore North	Vanajakshi Srinivas	Bhagyamma Krishnaiyya	Varalakshmi Govindegowda		Bharatiya Janata Party	M.B Govindegowda	Independent
72	Herohalli	Backward Category A	Yeshvanthapura	Bangalore North	Rajanna	H Raghunandan	Srikanth		Indian National Congress	A.M. Hanumanthegowda	Janata Dal (Secular)
73	Kottigepalya	Backward Category A	Rajarajeshwarinagar	Bangalore Rural	G Mohan Kumar	Thimmaraju	V Prakash		Indian National Congress	S. Venkatesh Babu	Bharatiya Janata Party
74	Shakthiganapathinagar	Scheduled Caste (Women)	Mahalakshmi Layout	Bangalore North	Chandrakala J Jagadish	Koushlaya Kodandaram	Gangamma Rajanna		Janata Dal (Secular)	Padmavathi Srinivas	Janata Dal (Secular)
75	Shankara Matha	Backward Category A	Mahalakshmi Layout	Bangalore North	M Shivaraju	B M Shrinivas	T R Puttaswamy		Indian National Congress	M. Shivaraju	Indian National Congress
76	Gayathrinagar	General (Women)	Malleshwaram	Bangalore North	Chandrakala Girish	Druthi K M	Manjula G		Indian National Congress	Chetan Gowda	Bharatiya Janata Party
77	Dattathreya Temple	General	Gandhi Nagar	Bangalore Central	R S Satynarayan	Datta (Dakshinamoorthy)	Girish G		Indian National Congress	R. S. Sathyanarayana	Indian National Congress
78	Pulakeshinagar	Backward Category A	Pulakeshinagar	Bangalore North	A R Zakir	Velu	Anthony Selvam		Indian National Congress	Abdul Rakeeb Zakir	Indian National Congress
79	Sarvagnanagar	Backward Category A (Women)	C. V. Raman Nagar	Bangalore Central	Manjula	Shashirekha Mukund	Dr Swapna Radhakrishanan		Bharatiya Janata Party	G. Bhuvaneshwari	Bharatiya Janata Party
80	Hoysalanagar	General	C. V. Raman Nagar	Bangalore Central	Lakshmi Venkatesh	B M Somu	Raghunanda	Anand Kumar (Independent)	Independent	Savitha Ramesh	Bharatiya Janata Party
81	Vignananagar	Backward Category A	Krishnarajapuram	Bangalore North	S G Nagaraj	V Mohanamurthy	Uncontested		Indian National Congress	Geetha Vivekananda	Bharatiya Janata Party
82	Garudacharpalya	Backward Category A	Mahadevapura	Bangalore Central	B N Nithish Purushotham	Anantharamaiya	Gangadar		Indian National Congress	N. Pillappa	Indian National Congress
83	Kadugodi	Scheduled Caste	Mahadevapura	Bangalore Central	P Rajanna	S Muniswami	M Suresh		Bharatiya Janata Party	K.N Anjaneya Reddy	Indian National Congress
84	Hagadooru	General	Mahadevapura	Bangalore Central	S Uday Kumar	Shridhar Reddy	T N Ashwathaiah		Indian National Congress	H.A.Srinivasa	Indian National Congress
85	Doddanekkundi	Backward Category A (Women)	Mahadevapura	Bangalore Central	Usha Guru	Shweta Vijayakumar	Jyothi Erachari		Bharatiya Janata Party	N.R. Sridhar Reddy	Bharatiya Janata Party
86	Marathahalli	General	Mahadevapura	Bangalore Central	R Ravikumar	P A Venkataswami Reddy	Srinivas Gowda	Ramesh (Independent)	Independent	J. Varalakshmi	Indian National Congress
87	HAL Airport	Scheduled Caste	Krishnarajapuram	Bangalore North	N Manjunath	Dr.Y R Shashidhar	K Gururaj		Indian National Congress	Siddalingaiah (Siddu)	Bharatiya Janata Party
88	Jeevanabima Nagar	Backward Category A (Women)	C. V. Raman Nagar	Bangalore Central	K R Prabhavathi	Veenakumari Ramakrishna	Ayesha		Bharatiya Janata Party	K ChandraShekar	Bharatiya Janata Party
89	Jogupalya	General	Shanthinagar	Bangalore Central	P Chandrashekhar	Gautham Kumar	Ruben Moses		Bharatiya Janata Party	M. Gowtham Kumar	Bharatiya Janata Party
90	Ulsoor	General (Women)	Shivajinagar	Bangalore Central	Yashoda Udaykumar	C G Sumati Ravi	G G Latha	Mamatha Saravana (Independent)	Independent	R. Uday Kumar	Indian National Congress
91	Bharathinagar	Backward Category A	Shivajinagar	Bangalore Central	Shakeel Ahmed	M Paari	Syed Mujaid		Indian National Congress	Shakeel Ahmad	Indian National Congress
92	Shivajinagar	General (Women)	Shivajinagar	Bangalore Central	Farida	K Yashodha	Raziya Sulthana		Indian National Congress	Fareeda	Independent
93	Vasanthnagar	General	Shivajinagar	Bangalore Central	B R Naidu	Sampathkumar	Ravi C		Bharatiya Janata Party	Katta Jagadish	Bharatiya Janata Party
94	Gandhinagar	Backward Category A	Gandhi Nagar	Bangalore Central	R J Lalitha	T Gopalakrishna	Ravi Kumar		Indian National Congress	S Nataraj	Indian National Congress
95	Subhashnagar	General	Gandhi Nagar	Bangalore Central	L Govindaraju	S Babu	Mallesh T		Indian National Congress Mallesh T	Indian National Congress	
96	Okalipuram	Backward Category A	Gandhi Nagar	Bangalore Central	G Sampath	V Shivaprakash	C Krishna		Bharatiya Janata Party	Queen Elizebeth	Indian National Congress
97	Dayanandanagar	General (Women)	Rajaji Nagar	Bangalore Central	Shakila Muniraju	Kumari Palanikanth	Vaani S M		Bharatiya Janata Party	Smt.M Shakeela	Indian National Congress
98	Prakashnagar	Backward Category B (Women)	Rajaji Nagar	Bangalore Central	Padmavathi G	Devikaraj	H R Nalini		Indian National Congress	K Raveendran	Bharatiya Janata Party
99	Rajajinagar	General	Rajaji Nagar	Bangalore Central	G Krishnamurthy	H R Krishnappa	Byanna		Indian National Congress	H.R Krishnappa	Bharatiya Janata Party
100	Basaveshwaranagar	General (Women)	Rajaji Nagar	Bangalore Central	Pramila H	Umavati Padmaraj	Kavitha		Bharatiya Janata Party	S.H. Padmaraj	Bharatiya Janata Party
101	Kamakshipalya	Backward Category A (Women)	Rajaji Nagar	Bangalore Central	Rekha Sudhakar Rao	Pratima K S Ramesh	Padma		Bharatiya Janata Party	K. Ranganna	Bharatiya Janata Party
102	Vrishabhavathi	General (Women)	Mahalakshmi Layout	Bangalore North	Shanthamma	Gangamma Shankarappa	S P Hemalatha		Janata Dal (Secular)	L Nagarathna	Janata Dal (Secular)
103	Kaveripura	Backward Category A (Women)	Govindraj Nagar	Bangalore South	Sunanda L	Vijayalakshmi Singh	R Ramila		Janata Dal (Secular)	R. Prakash	Janata Dal (Secular)
104	Govindarajanagar	General	Govindraj Nagar	Bangalore South	G Krishnappa	Umesh Shetti	Srinivas Kademane		Bharatiya Janata Party	Mohan Kumar	Bharatiya Janata Party
105	Agrahara Dasarahalli	General (Women)	Govindraj Nagar	Bangalore South	Kusuma	Shilpa G Shridhar	Tejaswini		Bharatiya Janata Party	Roopadevi	Bharatiya Janata Party
106	Dr. Rajkumar	Backward Category A (Women)	Govindraj Nagar	Bangalore South	Roopa R	M G Jayarathna	Navya V Shankar		Indian National Congress	Gangabyrayya	Bharatiya Janata Party
107	Shivanagar	Backward Category A (Women)	Rajaji Nagar	Bangalore Central	Manjula Vijaykumar	Puttalakshrni	Ashadevi		Indian National Congress	Manjunath	Bharatiya Janata Party
108	Srirama Mandir	General (Women)	Rajaji Nagar	Bangalore Central	Hemalatha Janardhan	Deepa Nagesh	Hemalatha Harish		Bharatiya Janata Party	M.G. Jayarathna	Bharatiya Janata Party
109	Chickpete	Backward Category A (Women)	Gandhi Nagar	Bangalore Central	H Bhagyalakshmi	S Leela Shivakumar	Dhanalakshmi		Bharatiya Janata Party	A.L Shivakumar	Bharatiya Janata Party
110	Sampangiramanagar	Backward Category B	Shivajinagar	Bangalore Central	R Vasanth Kumar	D Anand Kumar	Dhanalakshmi		Indian National Congress	M. Gopi	Bharatiya Janata Party
111	Shanthalanagar	Backward Category B	Shanthinagar	Bangalore Central	A Joseph Moses	M B Dhwarakanath	L N Raju		Bharatiya Janata Party	K. Shivakumar	Independent
112	Domlur	Backward Category A	Shanthinagar	Bangalore Central	Janakiram M	A Mariyappassvamy	T Krishnamurthy	Lakshminarayan (Independent)	Independent	Geetha Srinivasareddy	Bharatiya Janata Party
113	Konena Agrahara	General	C. V. Raman Nagar	Bangalore Central	Ramakrishna N	Surendranath Reddy	P Mahesh	Chandrappa Reddy (Independent)	Independent	M. Chandrappa Reddy	Bharatiya Janata Party
114	Agaram	Backward Category A (Women)	Shanthinagar	Bangalore Central	Shanthan Merry	Bhavya	Sunitha Prakash		Bharatiya Janata Party	Sarala	Indian National Congress
115	Vannarpet	General	Shanthinagar	Bangalore Central	Shafi Ahmed	K Shivakumar	Abdul Saleem		Bharatiya Janata Party	S. Vijayan	Indian National Congress
116	Neelasandra	Scheduled Caste	Shanthinagar	Bangalore Central	Balakrishnan G	V IVIuttu	M S Nandakumar		Indian National Congress	Lokesh	Indian National Congress
117	Shanthinagar	General (Women)	Shanthinagar	Bangalore Central	P Sowmya	R V Nagaratna Yadav	Valli Subramanya		Indian National Congress	P Sowmya	Indian National Congress
118	Sudhamanagar	General	Chickpet	Bangalore South	R V Yuvraj	C Shrinivas	V K Praveen		Indian National Congress	Kumari Avvayi	Indian National Congress
119	Dharmarayaswamy Temple	Backward Category A (Women)	Chickpet	Bangalore South	Rabiya Basri	Prathibha Dhanaraj	Vanitha Jaishankar		Bharatiya Janata Party	P. Dhanaraj	Bharatiya Janata Party
120	Cottonpet	General	Gandhi Nagar	Bangalore Central	D Pramod	P Palani	Shivappa		Indian National Congress	Vasanth Kumari	Bharatiya Janata Party
121	Binnipete	General (Women)	Gandhi Nagar	Bangalore Central	Mahadevamma Nagaraj	Pushparani Srinivas	Kalpana		Indian National Congress	N. SriVidya	Indian National Congress
122	Kempapura Agrahara	Scheduled Tribe (Women)	Vijay Nagar	Bangalore South	B Chandraprabha	Shobha Basavaraj	Uncontested	Gayathri (Independent)	Independent	Nirmala	Indian National Congress
123	Vijaynagar	Backward Category A (Women)	Vijay Nagar	Bangalore South	Binduja G	Srilatha Gopinatha Raju	Bhattamma		Bharatiya Janata Party	Sri.H. Raveendra	Bharatiya Janata Party
124	Hosahalli	General (Women)	Vijay Nagar	Bangalore South	H B Radhamma	R Mahalakshmi	S Lalitha		Bharatiya Janata Party	Dr. S. Raju	Bharatiya Janata Party
125	Marenahalli	General (Women)	Govindraj Nagar	Bangalore South	M Geetha	Madhukumari Vaagesh	Umadevi Ramachandra		Bharatiya Janata Party	N. Shakuntala	Bharatiya Janata Party
126	Maruthi Mandira	Backward Category A	Govindraj Nagar	Bangalore South	Siddharth C	Shanthakumari	Lokesh D		Bharatiya Janata Party	V. Vagish	Bharatiya Janata Party
127	Moodalapalya	Backward Category B	Govindraj Nagar	Bangalore South	L Lakshman Gowda	Dasegosvda	R Prakash		Bharatiya Janata Party	N. Shanthakumari	Bharatiya Janata Party
128	Nagarabhavi	Backward Category A	Govindraj Nagar	Bangalore South	Nayaz Pasha	Mohan Kumar	Bhagyamma N		Bharatiya Janata Party	K. Umesh Shetti	Bharatiya Janata Party
129	Jnanabharathi	Scheduled Caste (Women)	Rajarajeshwarinagar	Bangalore Rural	Kavyashree Manju	Tejaswini Sitaramaiyah	M Renuka		Bharatiya Janata Party	Govindaraju	Indian National Congress
130	Ullalu	Scheduled Caste (Women)	Yeshvanthapura	Bangalore North	Rohini Suresh	Sharada Muniraju	R Shobha		Bharatiya Janata Party	Rajanna	Indian National Congress
131	Nayandahalli	Backward Category A (Women)	Govindraj Nagar	Bangalore South	Sasvitha M	Shakuntala Doddalakkappa	Umadevi		Indian National Congress	H.S. Rajajeshwari	Bharatiya Janata Party
132	Attiguppe	Backward Category A	Vijay Nagar	Bangalore South	K Doddanna	Dr. S Raju	Mehaboob Khan D H		Bharatiya Janata Party	K. Doddanna	Indian National Congress
133	Hampinagar	General	Vijay Nagar	Bangalore South	S Srinath	Anand Hosur	K B Srinivas		Bharatiya Janata Party	R. ChandraShekarayya	Bharatiya Janata Party
134	Bapujinagar	General	Vijay Nagar	Bangalore South	Azmal Beig	T V Krishna	Arif Pasha		Indian National Congress	V. Krishna	Bharatiya Janata Party
135	Padarayanapura	General	Chamrajpet	Bangalore Central	Imran Sharief	Aproz Pasha	Imran Pasha		Janata Dal (Secular)	Najini Begum	Independent
136	Jagjivanram Nagar	Backward Category A (Women)	Chamrajpet	Bangalore Central	Seema Althaf Khan	Saroja Chandrashekhar	Beebi Jaan		Indian National Congress	Seema Kanum	Indian National Congress
137	Rayapuram	General (Women)	Chamrajpet	Bangalore Central	Shashikala Murthy	Shashikala Keshav	G S Dhanalakshmi		Bharatiya Janata Party	C.S. Radhakrishna	Janata Dal (Secular)
138	Chalavadipalya	General (Women)	Chamrajpet	Bangalore Central	Maheshwari	Rekha Kadiresh	Noori Khanam		Bharatiya Janata Party	Rekha Kadiresh	Bharatiya Janata Party
139	Krishnarajendra Market	Backward Category A (Women)	Chamrajpet	Bangalore Central	Bushra Anjum	Rekha K Govind	Nazima Khanam		Janata Dal (Secular)	G. A. Ashwath Narayana	Janata Dal (Secular)
140	Chamarajapet	General (Women)	Chamrajpet	Bangalore Central	B Kokila Chandrashekhar	Komal M Ganesh	R Shylaja		Indian National Congress	B.V Ganesh	Bharatiya Janata Party
141	Azadnagar	Backward Category A (Women)	Chamrajpet	Bangalore Central	M Sujatha	Rajakumari Chakrapani	Mustharl Begum		Indian National Congress	Gowramma	Indian National Congress
142	Sunkenahalli	Backward Category B	Chickpet	Bangalore South	B S Kiran Kumar	D N Ramesh	Channegowda		Bharatiya Janata Party	P. N. Sadashiva	Bharatiya Janata Party
143	Visvesvarapuram	General (Women)	Chickpet	Bangalore South	S Vijayakumari	Vani Rao	Latha Sukumar		Bharatiya Janata Party	S. Anil Kumar	Bharatiya Janata Party
144	Siddapura	General	Chickpet	Bangalore South	M Udayashankar	Vasanthakumar	Sardar Pasha	Muzahid Pasha (SDPI)	SDPI	M. Udayshankar	Indian National Congress
145	Hombegowdanagar	Backward Category A	Chickpet	Bangalore South	D Chandrappa	Suresh Babu	Mohammad Zulfikar Ali		Indian National Congress	D. Chandrappa	Independent
146	Lakkasandra	General	B.T.M Layout	Bangalore South	B Mohan	Mahesh Babu	Anantha		Bharatiya Janata Party	K. Mahesh Babu	Bharatiya Janata Party
147	Adugodi	Scheduled Caste (Women)	B.T.M Layout	Bangalore South	Manjula	Janakamma	Uncontested		Indian National Congress	S.N. Murugesh Modaliyaar	Indian National Congress
148	Ejipura	Scheduled Caste	B.T.M Layout	Bangalore South	T Ramachandra	Y Shantaraju	Ashok Kumar Y N		Indian National Congress	P.M Saroja	Indian National Congress
149	Varthur	Scheduled Caste (Women)	Mahadevapura	Bangalore Central	Nisha S Vasu	Pushpa Manjunath	Chamundeshwari Yellappa		Bharatiya Janata Party	S. UdayKumar	Indian National Congress
150	Bellandur	Scheduled Caste (Women)	Mahadevapura	Bangalore Central	Munilakshmamamma	N Asha Suresh	Manjula Mohan S		Bharatiya Janata Party	B.P. Babu Reddy	Indian National Congress
151	Koramangala	Backward Category B	B.T.M Layout	Bangalore South	M Chandrappa	H CV1Govindaraju	Uncontested		Indian National Congress	B.N. Kokila	Indian National Congress
152	Suddaguntepalya	General	B.T.M Layout	Bangalore South	G Manjunath	K Manjunath	H E Krishnappa		Indian National Congress	G. Manjunath	Bharatiya Janata Party
153	Jayanagar	General (Women)	Chickpet	Bangalore South	Gangambike Mallikarjun	Satyawati Krishnan	Sabeena Taj		Indian National Congress	Gangambika	Indian National Congress
154	Basavanagudi	General	Basavanagudi	Bangalore South	G R Murali	B S Sathyanarayana (Katte)	M Venkatesh		Bharatiya Janata Party	B.S. Sathyanarayana	Bharatiya Janata Party
155	Hanumanthanagar	General	Basavanagudi	Bangalore South	Goutham H N	Kempegowda	Prasad P V S		Bharatiya Janata Party	K. Chandrashekar	Indian National Congress
156	Srinagar	General (Women)	Basavanagudi	Bangalore South	K M Lavanya	J N Savitha	Nagarathna Thimmegowda		Bharatiya Janata Party	T. Thimmegowda	Janata Dal (Secular)
157	Gali Anjaneya Temple	General (Women)	Vijay Nagar	Bangalore South	Uma N	Vedha Ramesh	V Umavathi Chandrappa		Indian National Congress	B.S. Anand	Bharatiya Janata Party
158	Deepanjalinagar	Backward Category B (Women)	Vijay Nagar	Bangalore South	G Anasuya	Anupama Dhanapal	Ashwini T		Bharatiya Janata Party	Malathi	Bharatiya Janata Party
159	Kengeri	Backward Category A	Yeshvanthapura	Bangalore North	Harish Kumar M	V V Satyanarayana	Zakir Hussain		Bharatiya Janata Party	R. Anjanappa	Bharatiya Janata Party
160	Rajarajeshwarinagar	Backward Category A (Women)	Rajarajeshwarinagar	Bangalore Rural	Mamatha H V	Nalini Manjunath	Leelavathi N Ramesh		Bharatiya Janata Party	G.H.Ramachandra	Bharatiya Janata Party
161	Hosakerehalli	Backward Category A (Women)	Padmanabhanagar	Bangalore South	Rohini Chandrappa	Rajeshwari Cholraj	Chaitra S Jagadish		Bharatiya Janata Party	H. Narayana	Bharatiya Janata Party
162	Girinagar	General (Women)	Basavanagudi	Bangalore South	M C Sandhya Veerabhadra	Nandini Vijayavittal	Bhavya Hnaumanthegowda		Bharatiya Janata Party	H.S. Lalitha	Bharatiya Janata Party
163	Kathriguppe	General	Basavanagudi	Bangalore South	N Chuchendra Kumar	Sangathi Venkatesh	Shivaramegowda		Bharatiya Janata Party	D. Venkatesha Murthy	Bharatiya Janata Party
164	Vidyapeetha	General (Women)	Basavanagudi	Bangalore South	Kathyayini	Shamala Saiekumar	Shivamma Venkatesh		Bharatiya Janata Party	M. Venkatesh	Bharatiya Janata Party
165	Ganesh Mandira	Backward Category B (Women)	Padmanabhanagar	Bangalore South	Usha V	Lakshmi Umesh	Nagarathna		Bharatiya Janata Party	L. Govindraj	Indian National Congress
166	Karisandra	General (Women)	Padmanabhanagar	Bangalore South	Jyothishree Harireddy	Yashodha Lakshmikanth	Vidya G		Bharatiya Janata Party	Jyothisri Hari Reddy	Indian National Congress
167	Yediyur	General (Women)	Padmanabhanagar	Bangalore South	Lakshmi	Poornima Ramesh	Kusuma		Bharatiya Janata Party	N. R. Ramesh	Bharatiya Janata Party
168	Pattabhiramnagar	General (Women)	Jayanagar	Bangalore South	Lakshmi Chandrashekhar Raju	H C Nagarathna Ramamurthy	K M Shantha		Bharatiya Janata Party	C. K. Ramamurthy	Bharatiya Janata Party
169	Byrasandra	General	Jayanagar	Bangalore South	A Mohd Rasool	N Nagaraju	G Lokesh		Bharatiya Janata Party	N. Nagaraju	Bharatiya Janata Party
170	Jayanagar East	General	Jayanagar	Bangalore South	Samuilla	R Govinda Naidu	Shakeeb Ulla Khan		Bharatiya Janata Party	Muni Sanjeevayya	Indian National Congress
171	Gurappanapalya	Backward Category A	Jayanagar	Bangalore South	Mohd Rizwan Nawab	D Baba Fakruddin	Zameer Pasha		Indian National Congress	Mohammad Rizwan Navab	Indian National Congress
172	Madiwala	General	B.T.M Layout	Bangalore South	B N Manjunath Reddy	N Babu(Reddy)	Ashraf Ahmed		Indian National Congress	B.N. Manjunath Reddy	Indian National Congress
173	Jakkasandra	General (Women)	B.T.M Layout	Bangalore South	Lakshmi R	Saraswatamma	Yellamma		Bharatiya Janata Party	Saraswathamma	Bharatiya Janata Party
174	HSR Layout	General	Bommanahalli	Bangalore South	K Ramesh	K Gurumurthy Reddy	Mohd Saifulla		Bharatiya Janata Party	Smt.K. Latha	Bharatiya Janata Party
175	Bommanahalli	Backward Category A	Bommanahalli	Bangalore South	Syed Sardar	C R Ramamohan Raju	Uncontested		Bharatiya Janata Party	B.S. Manjunath Reddy	Bharatiya Janata Party
176	BTM Layout	General	B.T.M Layout	Bangalore South	G N K Babu	H K Mutthappa	K Devadas		Janata Dal (Secular)	G.N.R. Babu	Indian National Congress
177	J. P. Nagar	General (Women)	Jayanagar	Bangalore South	Asha	K N Lakshmi Nataraj	S Leelavathi		Bharatiya Janata Party	N. Chandrashekar Raju	Bharatiya Janata Party
178	Sarakki	General (Women)	Jayanagar	Bangalore South	Manjula Arun Kumar	Deepika L Manjunatha	Mahalsakshmi V		Bharatiya Janata Party	S.K. Nataraj	Bharatiya Janata Party
179	Shakambarinagar	General (Women)	Jayanagar	Bangalore South	Anuradha Devaraju	Malathi Somashekhar	Savitha Gowda		Bharatiya Janata Party	B. Somashekar	Bharatiya Janata Party
180	Banashankari Temple	General	Padmanabhanagar	Bangalore South	S Ansar Pasha	A H Basavaraj	Srinivas		Indian National Congress	Deewan Ali	Janata Dal (Secular)
181	Kumaraswamy Layout	General	Padmanabhanagar	Bangalore South	T Pramod Kumar	L Shrinivas	Venkatesh K		Bharatiya Janata Party	H. Suresh	Bharatiya Janata Party
182	Padmanabhanagar	General (Women)	Padmanabhanagar	Bangalore South	Prathibha M	L Shobha Anjanappa	V B Triveni Babu		Bharatiya Janata Party	L. Srinivas	Bharatiya Janata Party
183	Chikkalasandra	General (Women)	Padmanabhanagar	Bangalore South	Shashikumari K	Supriya Shekhar	G Kavitha		Bharatiya Janata Party	B. S. Venkataswamy Naidu	Bharatiya Janata Party
184	Uttarahalli	General	Bangalore South	Bangalore Rural	Varaprasad Reddy	Hanumantayya	R D Usharani		Bharatiya Janata Party	K.Ramesh Raju	Bharatiya Janata Party
185	Yelachenahalli	General	Bangalore South	Bangalore Rural	O Manjunath	V Balakrishna	Julfikar Ahmed Khan		Bharatiya Janata Party	O. Manjunath	Indian National Congress
186	Jaraganahalli	General (Women)	Bommanahalli	Bangalore South	Vinitha G	B rV1Shobha	Uncontested		Bharatiya Janata Party	Suguna Balakrishna	Bharatiya Janata Party
187	Puttenahalli	General (Women)	Bommanahalli	Bangalore South	Susheela Gurudev	R Prabhavati Ramesh	Rehmath Unnisa		Bharatiya Janata Party	L. Ramesh	Bharatiya Janata Party
188	Bilekahalli	General	Bommanahalli	Bangalore South	Ashwathnarayana Swami	K Narayana Raju	Jaikumar		Bharatiya Janata Party	M. Roopa Ramesh	Bharatiya Janata Party
189	Hongasandra	Backward Category A (Women)	Bommanahalli	Bangalore South	Uncontested	Bharathi Ramachandra	Uncontested	Uncontested	Bharatiya Janata Party	Sukanda	Bharatiya Janata Party
190	Mangammanapalya	General (Women)	Bommanahalli	Bangalore South	Shobha Jagadish	Mala Shrinivas Reddy	Manjula Lakshman		Indian National Congress	Syed Haseena Taj	Bharatiya Janata Party
191	Singasandra	Scheduled Caste (Women)	Bangalore South	Bangalore Rural	Vanitha Venkataswamy	V Shanta	Meenakshi Narayanappa		Bharatiya Janata Party	Kavitha Baburaj	Indian National Congress
192	Begur	Scheduled Caste	Bangalore South	Bangalore Rural	M Anjanappa	C Srinivas	Kumar		Indian National Congress	M Srinivas	Janata Dal (Secular)
193	Arakere	General (Women)	Bommanahalli	Bangalore South	Uma Srinivas Reddy	R Bhagyalakshmi	Kathyayini Venugopal		Bharatiya Janata Party	A.N. Purushotham	Bharatiya Janata Party
194	Gottigere	Scheduled Caste (Women)	Bangalore South	Bangalore Rural	Radha M	Lalitha T Narayan	Parvathamma		Bharatiya Janata Party	S.K. Pushpa	Indian National Congress
195	Konanakunte	General (Women)	Bangalore South	Bangalore Rural	Chamapaka K	Shashirekha Jayaram	Padma Ramesh Babu		Bharatiya Janata Party	S. Shashirekha Jayaram	Bharatiya Janata Party
196	Anjanapura	Backward Category A	Bangalore South	Bangalore Rural	Gangadhar	K Somashekhar	Mohammad Jabiulla		Bharatiya Janata Party	S. Gangadhar	Indian National Congress
197	Vasanthapura	General (Women)	Bangalore South	Bangalore Rural	Shobha Gowda	A Vijaya Ramesh	Lakshmi Annegowda		Indian National Congress	A. Vijaya	Bharatiya Janata Party
198	Hemmigepura	General	Yeshvanthapura	Bangalore North	Arya Srinivas	G H Ramachandra	Panchalingaiah		Indian National Congress	Veena Nagaraju	Bharatiya Janata Party

=== By Community ===
Candidates list by Caste for BJP and Congress
Community	Congress	BJP
Vokkaliga	49	45
SC/ST	35	30
Muslim	23	5
Reddy	15	14
Lingayat	3	3
Brahmin	2	6
Kuruba	23	19
Others	48	76
Total	198	198

== Results ==
=== List of successful candidates ===
Ward No.	Ward Name	Winner	Winner's Party	Winner's votes	Runner-up	Runner-up's Party	Runner-up's votes	Majority	Assembly Constituency	Lok Sabha Constituency	Area (km^{2})	Household (HH) - 2011	Population	Popn density
Ward No.	Ward Name	Winner	Winner's Party	Winner's votes	Runner-up	Runner-up's Party	Runner-up's votes	Majority	Assembly Constituency	Lok Sabha Constituency	Area (km^{2})	Household (HH) - 2011	2011	2011
1	Kempegowda Ward	Chandramma	Bharatiya Janata Party	9439	Dhanalakshmi Krishnamurthy	Indian National Congress	8295	1144	Yelahanka	Chikballapur	10.9	8647	34783	3182
2	Chowdeshwari Ward	R Padmavathi	Indian National Congress	10533	Vanishree Vishwanath	Bharatiya Janata Party	7426	3107	Yelahanka	Chikballapur	6.5	9506	36602	5635
3	Attur	Nethra Pallavi	Bharatiya Janata Party	12605	Shantha Rajanna	Indian National Congress	7954	4651	Yelahanka	Chikballapur	8.8	14605	58129	6606
4	Yelahanka Satellite Town	Sathish M	Bharatiya Janata Party	8808	Hanumanthegowda	Janata Dal (Secular)	7903	905	Yelahanka	Chikballapur	4.6	10583	41986	9224
5	Jakkur	K Munindra Kumar	Bharatiya Janata Party	13756	N Subramani	Indian National Congress	12311	1445	Byatarayanapura	Bangalore North	23.5	12387	52025	2215
6	Thanisandra	Mamatha K M	Indian National Congress	10995	M Savitramma	Bharatiya Janata Party	10095	900	Byatarayanapura	Bangalore North	10.0	16470	71855	7161
7	Byatarayanapura	P V Manjunath	Indian National Congress	18021	L Nanjappa	Bharatiya Janata Party	10619	7402	Byatarayanapura	Bangalore North	10.0	18691	72154	7198
8	Kodigehalli	Chethan K M	Indian National Congress	11582	Aswathanarayana Gowda	Bharatiya Janata Party	9392	2190	Byatarayanapura	Bangalore North	3.8	12036	47546	12369
9	Vidyaranyapura	Kusuma H	Bharatiya Janata Party	13742	Sudha T T	Indian National Congress	7826	5916	Byatarayanapura	Bangalore North	9.9	14448	57195	5753
10	Doddabommasandra	Jayalakshmi Pillappa	Bharatiya Janata Party	7628	Thejavathi	Indian National Congress	4429	3199	Byatarayanapura	Bangalore North	4.2	8379	36396	8673
11	Kuvempunagar	V Prathibha Rajan	Indian National Congress	10172	Sriramappa	Bharatiya Janata Party	6983	3189	Byatarayanapura	Bangalore North	7.1	8519	37128	5207
12	Shettyhalli	K Nagabhushan	Indian National Congress	14265	K C Venkatesh	Bharatiya Janata Party	13991	274	Dasarahalli	Bangalore North	8.1	15530	61071	7521
13	Mallasandra	Lokesh	Bharatiya Janata Party	10836	R Manjunath	Indian National Congress	10143	693	Dasarahalli	Bangalore North	1.3	11221	41482	31753
14	Bagalagunte	K Narasimha Nayak	Bharatiya Janata Party	13600	M Ngaraju	Indian National Congress	7140	6460	Dasarahalli	Bangalore North	4.3	17117	65113	15203
15	T. Dasarahalli	Umadevi Nagaraj	Bharatiya Janata Party	11161	Uma Salma Basheer	Indian National Congress	3545	7616	Dasarahalli	Bangalore North	0.9	8849	33042	37474
16	Jalahalli	J N Srinivas Murthy	Indian National Congress	7020	Rakesh N	Bharatiya Janata Party	5727	1293	Rajarajeshwarinagar	Bangalore Rural	5.2	9191	37959	7354
17	J. P. Park	Mamatha K B Vasudev	Bharatiya Janata Party	9469	K Sunanda	Indian National Congress	8222	1247	Rajarajeshwarinagar	Bangalore Rural	2.0	12553	49610	24203
18	Radhakrishna Temple	M Anand	Janata Dal (Secular)	8057	R Krishnadevaraya	Bharatiya Janata Party	3626	4431	Hebbal	Bangalore North	1.9	9058	35122	18014
19	Sanjaynagar	Indira Subhash	Bharatiya Janata Party	5657	Sudha Jayasimha	Indian National Congress	4664	993	Hebbal	Bangalore North	1.5	8153	32491	21096
20	Ganganagar	Pramila Anand	Bharatiya Janata Party	5982	Dr Radha Harish	Indian National Congress	4863	1119	Hebbal	Bangalore North	2.3	6592	27361	12096
21	Hebbala	Anand Kumar	Indian National Congress	7343	Jayappa Reddy	Bharatiya Janata Party	5537	1806	Hebbal	Bangalore North	1.2	8181	32516	26455
22	Vishwanathnagenahalli	Rajashekharan V	Janata Dal (Secular)	9100	D Venkatesh	Bharatiya Janata Party	6901	2199	Hebbal	Bangalore North	1.5	12704	51592	34772
23	Nagavara	Irshad Begum	Indian National Congress	10846	Shajiya S	Independent	10236	610	Sarvagnanagar	Bangalore Central	2.1	12295	60483	29205
24	HBR Layout	P Anand	Indian National Congress	10737	K Narayanaswamy	Bharatiya Janata Party	6781	3956	Sarvagnanagar	Bangalore Central	4.6	13612	58967	12717
25	Horamavu	Radhamma	Indian National Congress	24756	N Bharathi Muniraju	Bharatiya Janata Party	16222	8534	Krishnarajapuram	Bangalore North	17.5	23999	95368	5437
26	Ramamurthynagar	Padmavathi Srinivas	Bharatiya Janata Party	13355	M Shantha	Indian National Congress	11293	2062	Krishnarajapuram	Bangalore North	7.3	11674	47358	6523
27	Banaswadi	Kodanda Reddy	Bharatiya Janata Party	9067	B C Prabhakar Reddy	Indian National Congress	6597	2470	Sarvagnanagar	Bangalore Central	3.4	12922	51268	14940
28	Kammanahalli	Munilakshmamma	Bharatiya Janata Party	8689	B Kalpana	Indian National Congress	6419	2270	Sarvagnanagar	Bangalore Central	1.0	11479	47074	45494
29	Kacharakanahalli	Padmanabha Reddy	Bharatiya Janata Party	7512	J Ashok Reddy (Papayya Reddy)	Indian National Congress	6578	934	Sarvagnanagar	Bangalore Central	1.7	8700	33588	19916
30	Kadugondanahalli	Noushir Ahmad	Indian National Congress	6122	Mohammad Javed Azam	Independent	4155	1967	Sarvagnanagar	Bangalore Central	0.7	9758	45748	65514
31	Kushalnagar	Umme Salma	Janata Dal (Secular)	8352	Noor Jahan Sharief	Indian National Congress	6715	1637	Pulakeshinagar	Bangalore North	0.6	8192	41936	65065
32	Kavalbyrasandra	Netra Narayan	Janata Dal (Secular)	7375	Y R Gowramma	Bharatiya Janata Party	5944	1431	Pulakeshinagar	Bangalore North	1.6	9540	39334	24771
33	Manorayanapalya	Abdul Wajid	Indian National Congress	5625	Ashwak Ahmed	Janata Dal (Secular)	3811	1814	Hebbal	Bangalore North	0.8	10572	47926	59123
34	Gangenahalli	M Nagaraja	Bharatiya Janata Party	4639	E B Vijikumar	Indian National Congress	4085	554	Hebbal	Bangalore North	1.1	6058	24308	22226
35	Aramanenagar	Sumangala B	Bharatiya Janata Party	6486	Latha R	Indian National Congress	3693	2793	Malleshwaram	Bangalore North	7.5	8825	36738	4919
36	Mathikere	Jayaprakash M C	Bharatiya Janata Party	8584	Harish K E	Indian National Congress	7172	1412	Malleshwaram	Bangalore North	0.9	9592	37036	41069
37	Yeshwanthpura	G K Venkatesh	Indian National Congress	11583	K Jayakumar	Janata Dal (Secular)	4374	7209	Rajarajeshwarinagar	Bangalore Rural	0.8	10326	41107	53039
38	H. M. T.	Asha Suresh	Indian National Congress	9031	K Manjula	Bharatiya Janata Party	6081	2950	Rajarajeshwarinagar	Bangalore Rural	5.2	9524	36879	7053
39	Chokkasandra	Sarvamangala Nagaraj	Bharatiya Janata Party	12114	Lakshmamma M Muniswamy	Janata Dal (Secular)	11212	902	Dasarahalli	Bangalore North	3.8	16537	59289	15752
40	Dodda Bidarkallu	Vasudeva S	Indian National Congress	16069	Gopal R	Janata Dal (Secular)	11114	4955	Yeshvanthapura	Bangalore North	12.9	19506	72794	5649
41	Peenya Industrial Area	Lalitha Thimananjaiah	Indian National Congress	8399	Latha Ramesh	Janata Dal (Secular)	8378	21	Dasarahalli	Bangalore North	5.5	15805	57814	10423
42	Lakshmidevinagar	Velu Nayakar	Indian National Congress	9136	Makali Paramesh	Bharatiya Janata Party	5739	3397	Rajarajeshwarinagar	Bangalore Rural	1.5	10620	41352	27235
43	Nandini Layout	K V Rajendra Kumar	Bharatiya Janata Party	10244	M Nagaraj	Indian National Congress	9334	910	Mahalakshmi Layout	Bangalore North	1.4	13291	51200	36191
44	Marappana Palya	Mahadev M	Janata Dal (Secular)	9091	Anandamurthy	Indian National Congress	4354	4737	Mahalakshmi Layout	Bangalore North	2.0	10051	40212	19785
45	Malleshwaram	N Jayapal	Bharatiya Janata Party	7984	Dr Rajesh	Indian National Congress	5773	2211	Malleshwaram	Bangalore North	1.8	8503	34196	18939
46	Jayachamarajendranagar	Ganesh Rao Mane	Bharatiya Janata Party	6106	Govindaraju N	Indian National Congress	5940	166	Hebbal	Bangalore North	0.9	7696	31449	35246
47	Devarajeevanahalli	Sampathraj	Indian National Congress	9598	Syed Usman	Janata Dal (Secular)	3532	6066	Pulakeshinagar	Bangalore North	1.4	8941	42135	30833
48	Muneshwaranagar	Syed Sazida	Indian National Congress	6089	Kriya Shailaja	Janata Dal (Secular)	3761	2328	Pulakeshinagar	Bangalore North	0.5	7419	35814	74511
49	Lingarajapuram	Lavanya Ganesh	Indian National Congress	9332	Savithri Radhakrishna	Bharatiya Janata Party	2821	6511	Sarvagnanagar	Bangalore Central	0.9	8850	37955	43274
50	Benniganahalli	Meenakshi	Indian National Congress	8701	Vijayalakshmi Krishna	Bharatiya Janata Party	8307	394	C. V. Raman Nagar	Bangalore Central	4.9	12384	49094	9980
51	Vijinapura	S Raju (Bande Raja)	Bharatiya Janata Party	10449	Syed Mastan	Indian National Congress	10214	235	Krishnarajapuram	Bangalore North	2.1	11087	46159	22464
52	Krishnarajapuram	K Poornima	Bharatiya Janata Party	11037	D K Mohan	Indian National Congress	10487	550	Krishnarajapuram	Bangalore North	4.8	8961	35168	7308
53	Basavanapura	B N Jayaprakash	Indian National Congress	10651	K Sundar Raju	Bharatiya Janata Party	10641	10	Krishnarajapuram	Bangalore North	6.3	11936	48585	7740
54	Hoodi	Hariprasad A C	Indian National Congress	12109	H V Manjunath	Bharatiya Janata Party	10364	1745	Mahadevapura	Bangalore Central	15	12579	50191	3349
55	Devasandra	M N Srikanth	Indian National Congress	6983	Manjuladevi R	Bharatiya Janata Party	6099	884	Krishnarajapuram	Bangalore North	3.5	8638	33946	9754
56	A. Narayanapura	V Suresh	Indian National Congress	12197	V C Raju	Bharatiya Janata Party	6808	5389	Krishnarajapuram	Bangalore North	2.1	11039	43443	20286
57	C. V. Raman Nagar	Aruna Ravi	Bharatiya Janata Party	11487	Shilpa K S	Indian National Congress	5800	5687	C. V. Raman Nagar	Bangalore Central	3.6	16710	58815	16379
58	Hosathippasandra	Shilpa K S	Indian National Congress	9019	Suma Srinivas	Bharatiya Janata Party	7668	1351	C. V. Raman Nagar	Bangalore Central	3.4	12200	43983	13085
59	Maruthisevanagar	Hanna Bhuvaneshwari	Indian National Congress	7521	Shrikanth Seetharam	Bharatiya Janata Party	6625	896	Sarvagnanagar	Bangalore Central	2.4	10113	40362	16942
60	Sagayarapuram	Elumalai	Independent	5345	Smt Maari Mutthu	Janata Dal (Secular)	4144	1201	Pulakeshinagar	Bangalore North	0.8	7340	35334	45792
61	S. K. Garden	Mohd Zameer Shah	Indian National Congress	5886	Mahesh Kumar	Janata Dal (Secular)	2978	2908	Pulakeshinagar	Bangalore North	1.3	7941	38050	29129
62	Ramaswamypalya	Netravathi Krishnegowda	Indian National Congress	7297	Girija Prakash	Bharatiya Janata Party	4209	3088	Shivajinagar	Bangalore Central	0.8	7530	34394	41334
63	Jayamahal	M K Gunashekhar	Indian National Congress	4960	Kaleem Pasha	Janata Dal (Secular)	1922	3038	Shivajinagar	Bangalore Central	1.4	4808	21728	14986
64	Rajamahal	Hemalatha Sathish Seth	Bharatiya Janata Party	6728	Veena Vishwanath	Indian National Congress	6368	360	Malleshwaram	Bangalore North	0.7	7641	31118	43530
65	Kadumalleshwara	Manjunath Raju	Bharatiya Janata Party	8953	L Nithyananda Prabhu	Indian National Congress	5542	3411	Malleshwaram	Bangalore North	1.4	9823	35609	26086
66	Subrahmanyanagar	H Manjunath	Indian National Congress	8272	Shivarajamurthy D	Bharatiya Janata Party	6749	1523	Malleshwaram	Bangalore North	0.9	9383	35709	37919
67	Nagapura	Badregowda	Janata Dal (Secular)	7434	S Harish	Bharatiya Janata Party	7200	234	Mahalakshmi Layout	Bangalore North	1.8	8667	34575	19260
68	Mahalakshmipuram	S Keshavamurthy	Indian National Congress	8824	M S Shivanandamurthy	Bharatiya Janata Party	5905	2919	Mahalakshmi Layout	Bangalore North	0.9	11563	44615	47275
69	Laggere	Manjula Narayanaswamy	Janata Dal (Secular)	12625	Ambujakshi Ravigowda	Indian National Congress	9727	2898	Rajarajeshwarinagar	Bangalore Rural	1.6	15178	57077	36245
70	Rajagopalanagar	Padmavathi Narasimhamurthy	Janata Dal (Secular)	10772	Anitha Suresh	Bharatiya Janata Party	9144	1628	Dasarahalli	Bangalore North	2.2	17262	61479	28249
71	Hegganahalli	Bhagyamma K	Bharatiya Janata Party	14187	Varalakshmi Govindegowda	Janata Dal (Secular)	9092	5095	Dasarahalli	Bangalore North	1.8	18438	66314	37639
72	Herohalli	Rajanna	Indian National Congress	12082	Srikanth	Janata Dal (Secular)	11810	272	Yeshvanthapura	Bangalore North	7.8	16215	62272	8035
73	Kottigepalya	G Mohan Kumar	Indian National Congress	15185	Thimmaraju	Bharatiya Janata Party	11235	3950	Rajarajeshwarinagar	Bangalore Rural	5.8	17739	68922	11784
74	Shakthiganapathinagar	Gangamma Rajanna	Janata Dal (Secular)	7782	Chandrakala J Jagadish	Indian National Congress	6887	895	Mahalakshmi Layout	Bangalore North	0.7	11074	43844	62588
75	Shankara Matha	M Shivaraju	Indian National Congress	7919	B M Srinivas	Bharatiya Janata Party	6918	1001	Mahalakshmi Layout	Bangalore North	1.1	12433	48734	44963
76	Gayathrinagar	Chandrakala Harish	Indian National Congress	8384	Dhruthi K M	Bharatiya Janata Party	6308	2076	Malleshwaram	Bangalore North	0.6	8489	33236	51465
77	Dattathreya Temple	R S Satynarayan	Indian National Congress	6958	Datta N Nanjappa	Bharatiya Janata Party	4115	2843	Gandhi Nagar	Bangalore Central	0.7	8325	33388	46485
78	Pulakeshinagar	A R Zakir	Indian National Congress	7278	S Aslam Pasha	Independent	1550	5728	Pulakeshinagar	Bangalore North	1.7	6595	28835	16761
79	Sarvagnanagar	Shashirekha Mukund	Bharatiya Janata Party	7094	Manjula	Indian National Congress	6011	1083	C. V. Raman Nagar	Bangalore Central	3.6	9052	37291	10218
80	Hoysalanagar	Anand Kumar	Independent	6439	Lakshmi Venkatesh	Indian National Congress	4371	2068	C. V. Raman Nagar	Bangalore Central	2.1	8877	35228	17131
81	Vignananagar	S G Nagaraj	Indian National Congress	10993	V Mohanmurthy	Bharatiya Janata Party	9680	1313	Krishnarajapuram	Bangalore North	5.7	15419	57062	9935
82	Garudacharpalya	B N Nithish Purushotham	Indian National Congress	10059	Anantharamaiah	Bharatiya Janata Party	9815	244	Mahadevapura	Bangalore Central	6.8	13453	49631	7316
83	Kadugodi	S Muniswamy	Bharatiya Janata Party	8590	P Rajanna	Indian National Congress	8034	556	Mahadevapura	Bangalore Central	11.2	11423	43942	3934
84	Hagadooru	S Uday Kumar	Indian National Congress	11965	Sridhar Reddy	Bharatiya Janata Party	11794	171	Mahadevapura	Bangalore Central	12.6	13419	50556	4003
85	Doddanekkundi	Shwetha Vijayakumar	Bharatiya Janata Party	10740	Usha Guru	Indian National Congress	8766	1974	Mahadevapura	Bangalore Central	12.0	17755	63083	5270
86	Marathahalli	Ramesh	Independent	6707	R Ravikumar	Indian National Congress	4446	2261	Mahadevapura	Bangalore Central	3.1	11051	39768	12679
87	HAL Airport	N Manjunath	Indian National Congress	9232	Dr Y R Shashidhar	Bharatiya Janata Party	6146	3086	Krishnarajapuram	Bangalore North	6.8	10044	39926	5888
88	Jeevanabima Nagar	Veena Kumari	Bharatiya Janata Party	6572	K R Prabhavathi	Indian National Congress	5495	1077	C. V. Raman Nagar	Bangalore Central	1.9	9741	38251	20286
89	Jogupalya	Gautham Kumar	Bharatiya Janata Party	8207	P Chandrashekhar	Indian National Congress	5408	2799	Shanthinagar	Bangalore Central	0.9	8806	33793	37452
90	Ulsoor	Mamatha Saravana	Independent	6782	Yashoda Udaykumar	Indian National Congress	3184	3598	Shivajinagar	Bangalore Central	1.7	7771	35090	20803
91	Bharathinagar	Shakeel Ahmed	Indian National Congress	6984	Umamaheshwara	Bharatiya Janata Party	5476	1508	Shivajinagar	Bangalore Central	0.8	7074	32689	41815
92	Shivajinagar	Fareeda	Indian National Congress	10716	Shama Sulthana	Independent	1525	9191	Shivajinagar	Bangalore Central	0.4	7276	37506	87856
93	Vasanthnagar	Sampath Kumar	Bharatiya Janata Party	4348	B R Naidu	Indian National Congress	3773	575	Shivajinagar	Bangalore Central	3.1	5304	22815	7286
94	Gandhinagar	R J Lalitha	Indian National Congress	6494	Gopalakrishna	Bharatiya Janata Party	5881	613	Gandhi Nagar	Bangalore Central	1.9	6599	31208	16334
95	Subhashnagar	L Govindaraju	Indian National Congress	5923	V Nagaraj	Independent	4093	1830	Gandhi Nagar	Bangalore Central	1.3	8711	37693	28599
96	Okalipuram	V Shivaprakash	Bharatiya Janata Party	6539	C Krishna	Janata Dal (Secular)	4302	2237	Gandhi Nagar	Bangalore Central	0.8	8693	38110	46279
97	Dayanandanagar	Kumari Palanikanth	Bharatiya Janata Party	7326	Shakila Muniraju	Indian National Congress	5891	1435	Rajaji Nagar	Bangalore Central	0.4	8253	35721	80035
98	Prakashnagar	Padmavathi G	Indian National Congress	10884	Devika Raj	Bharatiya Janata Party	3830	7054	Rajaji Nagar	Bangalore Central	0.6	8276	32913	57730
99	Rajajinagar	G Krishnamurthy	Indian National Congress	6401	H R Krishnappa	Bharatiya Janata Party	6003	398	Rajaji Nagar	Bangalore Central	0.9	8398	33084	38388
100	Basaveshwaranagar	Umavathi Padmaraj	Bharatiya Janata Party	8098	Pramila H	Indian National Congress	5796	2302	Rajaji Nagar	Bangalore Central	0.8	7495	30333	36191
101	Kamakshipalya	Pratima K S Ramesh	Bharatiya Janata Party	7880	Rekha Sudhakar Rao	Indian National Congress	3655	4225	Rajaji Nagar	Bangalore Central	0.9	7482	30051	33135
102	Vrishabhavathi	S P Hemalatha	Janata Dal (Secular)	16654	Shanthamma	Indian National Congress	4604	12050	Mahalakshmi Layout	Bangalore North	1.0	13443	50893	51187
103	Kaveripura	R Ramila	Janata Dal (Secular)	12037	Sunanda L	Indian National Congress	9366	2671	Govindraj Nagar	Bangalore South	1.7	14168	53532	32357
104	Govindarajanagar	Umesh Shetty	Bharatiya Janata Party	7865	G Krishnappa	Indian National Congress	5239	2626	Govindraj Nagar	Bangalore South	0.8	6678	26873	34956
105	Agrahara Dasarahalli	Shilpa G Sridhar	Bharatiya Janata Party	7992	Kusuma	Indian National Congress	6179	1813	Govindraj Nagar	Bangalore South	0.8	7192	28355	35597
106	Dr. Rajkumar	Roopa R	Indian National Congress	4709	M G Jayarathna	Bharatiya Janata Party	4041	668	Govindraj Nagar	Bangalore South	1.0	6077	24181	24492
107	Shivanagar	Manjula Vijaykumar	Indian National Congress	6435	Puualakshmi	Bharatiya Janata Party	5933	502	Rajaji Nagar	Bangalore Central	0.8	9260	36461	46943
108	Srirama Mandir	Deepa Nagesh	Bharatiya Janata Party	6927	Hemalatha Janardhan	Indian National Congress	4945	1982	Rajaji Nagar	Bangalore Central	1.1	8156	33866	31973
109	Chickpete	Leela Shivakumar	Bharatiya Janata Party	7251	H Bhagyalakshmi	Indian National Congress	6058	1193	Gandhi Nagar	Bangalore Central	0.7	6842	33292	46929
110	Sampangiramanagar	R Vasanth Kumar	Indian National Congress	5654	Anand	Bharatiya Janata Party	4972	682	Shivajinagar	Bangalore Central	4.4	6423	27504	6185
111	Shanthalanagar	M B Dwarakanath	Bharatiya Janata Party	3996	A Joseph Moses	Indian National Congress	3372	624	Shanthinagar	Bangalore Central	4.0	5493	22995	5745
112	Domlur	Lakshminarayan	Independent	5994	Janakiram M	Indian National Congress	3680	2314	Shanthinagar	Bangalore Central	1.7	7844	30638	17557
113	Konena Agrahara	Chandrappa Reddy	Independent	4893	Surendranath Reddy	Bharatiya Janata Party	4584	309	C. V. Raman Nagar	Bangalore Central	2.1	10725	38108	17919
114	Agaram	Bhavya	Bharatiya Janata Party	5348	Shanthan Merry	Indian National Congress	5187	161	Shanthinagar	Bangalore Central	11.0	7734	36916	3345
115	Vannarpet	K Shivakumar	Bharatiya Janata Party	7709	Shafi Ahmed	Indian National Congress	5519	2190	Shanthinagar	Bangalore Central	0.8	8466	37060	48898
116	Neelasandra	Balakrishnan G	Indian National Congress	8960	H M Gangappa	Independent	2994	5966	Shanthinagar	Bangalore Central	0.5	10743	48534	94287
117	Shanthinagar	P Sowmya	Indian National Congress	10878	R V Nagaratna Yadav	Bharatiya Janata Party	4789	6089	Shanthinagar	Bangalore Central	2.7	9465	42095	15494
118	Sudhamanagar	R V Yuvaraj	Indian National Congress	6996	V K Praveen	Janata Dal (Secular)	4033	2963	Chickpet	Bangalore South	1.0	5953	28784	28586
119	Dharmarayaswamy Temple	Prathibha Dhanraj	Bharatiya Janata Party	6332	Rabiya Basri	Indian National Congress	5380	952	Chickpet	Bangalore South	1.1	5485	27076	24561
120	Cottonpet	D Pramod	Indian National Congress	9280	P Palani	Bharatiya Janata Party	5622	3658	Gandhi Nagar	Bangalore Central	0.8	8652	37344	49463
121	Binnipete	Mahadevamma Nagaraj	Indian National Congress	12258	P Pushparani	Bharatiya Janata Party	3118	9140	Gandhi Nagar	Bangalore Central	0.8	9061	37354	48081
122	Kempapura Agrahara	Gayathri	Independent	8630	Rekha Siddharaju	Bharatiya Janata Party	5821	2809	Vijay Nagar	Bangalore South	0.4	10051	40032	113291
123	Vijaynagar	Srilatha Gopinathraju	Bharatiya Janata Party	10748	Binduja G	Indian National Congress	6170	4578	Vijay Nagar	Bangalore South	0.7	9943	40331	55298
124	Hosahalli	R Mahalakshmi	Bharatiya Janata Party	8992	H B Radhamma	Indian National Congress	6541	2451	Vijay Nagar	Bangalore South	0.9	9068	37347	55298
125	Marenahalli	Madhukumari Vageesh	Bharatiya Janata Party	5661	M Geetha	Indian National Congress	4375	1286	Govindraj Nagar	Bangalore South	0.7	5423	21171	30709
126	Maruthi Mandira	V Shantha Kumari	Bharatiya Janata Party	6806	Siddharth C	Indian National Congress	6686	120	Govindraj Nagar	Bangalore South	0.8	7716	29319	37155
127	Moodalapalya	Dase Gowda	Bharatiya Janata Party	9675	R Prakash	Janata Dal (Secular)	6342	3333	Govindraj Nagar	Bangalore South	1.0	11125	43729	45077
128	Nagarabhavi	Mohan Kumar	Bharatiya Janata Party	8062	Nayaz Pasha	Indian National Congress	7364	698	Govindraj Nagar	Bangalore South	1.6	8255	35780	22406
129	Jnanabharathi	Tejaswini Sitaramaiah	Bharatiya Janata Party	15113	Kavyashree Manju	Indian National Congress	11020	4093	Rajarajeshwarinagar	Bangalore Rural	11.9	17410	68132	5743
130	Ullalu	Sharada Muniraju	Bharatiya Janata Party	16051	Rohini Suresh	Indian National Congress	11223	4828	Yeshvanthapura	Bangalore North	8.7	14511	58199	6688
131	Nayandahalli	M Savitha	Indian National Congress	7040	Shakunthala Lakkappa	Bharatiya Janata Party	5830	1210	Govindraj Nagar	Bangalore South	2.1	10285	42785	20860
132	Attiguppe	Dr S Raju	Bharatiya Janata Party	8590	K Doddanna	Indian National Congress	8068	522	Vijay Nagar	Bangalore South	1.4	10576	41487	29971
133	Hampinagar	Anand Hosur	Bharatiya Janata Party	8931	S Srinath	Indian National Congress	6203	2728	Vijay Nagar	Bangalore South	1.1	8456	35113	31659
134	Bapujinagar	Azmal Beig	Indian National Congress	7639	V Krishna	Bharatiya Janata Party	6469	1170	Vijay Nagar	Bangalore South	0.7	10647	49484	72549
135	Padarayanapura	Imran Pasha	Janata Dal (Secular)	8605	Sayyed Ibrahim Hussein	Independent	3580	5025	Chamrajpet	Bangalore Central	0.3	7273	37599	118059
136	Jagjivanram Nagar	Seema Althaf Khan	Indian National Congress	9055	Beebi Jaan	Janata Dal (Secular)	6530	2525	Chamrajpet	Bangalore Central	0.6	7751	38639	60762
137	Rayapuram	Shashikala Keshav	Bharatiya Janata Party	5077	G S Dhanalakshmi	Janata Dal (Secular)	4799	278	Chamrajpet	Bangalore Central	0.4	7549	36039	81770
138	Chalavadipalya	Rekha Kadiresh	Bharatiya Janata Party	4966	Noori Khanam	Janata Dal (Secular)	4359	607	Chamrajpet	Bangalore Central	0.4	4896	24801	62762
139	Krishnarajendra Market	Nazima Khanam	Janata Dal (Secular)	5468	Bushra Anjum	Indian National Congress	2311	3157	Chamrajpet	Bangalore Central	0.8	5903	29344	36068
140	Chamarajapet	B Kokila Chandrashekhar	Indian National Congress	5417	Komal M Ganesh	Bharatiya Janata Party	4477	940	Chamrajpet	Bangalore Central	1.0	7500	32213	30976
141	Azadnagar	M Sujatha	Indian National Congress	8466	Mustharl Begum	Janata Dal (Secular)	5995	2471	Chamrajpet	Bangalore Central	0.7	9246	38825	57539
142	Sunkenahalli	DN Ramesh	Bharatiya Janata Party	8315	B S Kiran Kumar	Indian National Congress	5894	2421	Chickpet	Bangalore South	1.5	8643	34666	23137
143	Visvesvarapuram	Vani Rao	Bharatiya Janata Party	7192	S Vijayakumari	Indian National Congress	4537	2655	Chickpet	Bangalore South	2.5	7361	32462	13186
144	Siddapura	Muzahid Pasha	SDPI	5536	M Udayashankar	Indian National Congress	5151	385	Chickpet	Bangalore South	0.7	7396	34879	52299
145	Hombegowdanagar	D Chandrappa	Indian National Congress	6865	Suresh Babu	Bharatiya Janata Party	5797	1068	Chickpet	Bangalore South	1.4	8948	38309	27202
146	Lakkasandra	Mahesh Babu	Bharatiya Janata Party	6717	B Mohan	Indian National Congress	5437	1280	B.T.M Layout	Bangalore South	1.3	7229	30667	23689
147	Adugodi	Manjula	Indian National Congress	7247	Janakamma	Bharatiya Janata Party	5276	1971	B.T.M Layout	Bangalore South	1.6	8236	34299	21559
148	Ejipura	T Ramachandra	Indian National Congress	8098	Y Shantaraju	Bharatiya Janata Party	6047	2051	B.T.M Layout	Bangalore South	1.9	12575	47004	25093
149	Varthur	Pushpa Manjunath	Bharatiya Janata Party	13055	Nisha S Vasu	Indian National Congress	11090	1965	Mahadevapura	Bangalore Central	28.3	14256	54625	1929
150	Bellandur	N Asha Suresh	Bharatiya Janata Party	15119	Munilakshmamamma	Indian National Congress	7428	7691	Mahadevapura	Bangalore Central	26.4	22368	80180	3041
151	Koramangala	M Chandrappa	Indian National Congress	7373	H M Govindaraju	Bharatiya Janata Party	5755	1618	B.T.M Layout	Bangalore South	3.7	9719	38316	10323
152	Suddaguntepalya	G Manjunath	Indian National Congress	6200	M Kodandarama	Independent	4805	1395	B.T.M Layout	Bangalore South	1.7	10933	39997	23063
153	Jayanagar	Gangambike Mallikarjun	Indian National Congress	10143	Kavitha Jain	Bharatiya Janata Party	3173	6970	Chickpet	Bangalore South	2.5	8427	38151	15288
154	Basavanagudi	B S Satyanarayana	Bharatiya Janata Party	8798	G R Murali	Indian National Congress	5412	3386	Basavanagudi	Bangalore South	1.2	8624	32640	28071
155	Hanumanthanagar	Kempegowda	Bharatiya Janata Party	6592	Prasad P V S	Janata Dal (Secular)	3945	2647	Basavanagudi	Bangalore South	1.0	9483	36982	37440
156	Srinagar	J M Savitha	Bharatiya Janata Party	6814	Nagarathna Thimmegowda	Janata Dal (Secular)	6442	372	Basavanagudi	Bangalore South	0.8	10574	41379	51685
157	Gali Anjaneya Temple	Uma N	Indian National Congress	6663	Vedha Ramesh	Bharatiya Janata Party	4518	2145	Vijay Nagar	Bangalore South	1.1	8668	34653	30439
158	Deepanjalinagar	Anupama Dharmapal	Bharatiya Janata Party	7227	G Anasuya	Indian National Congress	5725	1502	Vijay Nagar	Bangalore South	2.1	11676	45928	21980
159	Kengeri	BV Satyanaraya	Bharatiya Janata Party	11528	Harish Kumar M	Indian National Congress	7832	3696	Yeshvanthapura	Bangalore North	5.1	10168	40771	7980
160	Rajarajeshwarinagar	Nalini Manjunath	Bharatiya Janata Party	17968	Mamatha H V	Indian National Congress	7751	10217	Rajarajeshwarinagar	Bangalore Rural	11.1	14408	56897	5112
161	Hosakerehalli	Rajeshwarai Cholraj	Bharatiya Janata Party	9460	Chaitra S Jagadish	Janata Dal (Secular)	7218	2242	Padmanabhanagar	Bangalore South	1.3	12122	46805	34776
162	Girinagar	A V Nandini Vijay Vittal	Bharatiya Janata Party	10984	Bhavya Hnaumanthegowda	Janata Dal (Secular)	3927	7057	Basavanagudi	Bangalore South	1.8	11180	43195	24537
163	Kathriguppe	Sangathi Venkatesh	Bharatiya Janata Party	10795	N Chuchendra Kumar	Indian National Congress	2455	8340	Basavanagudi	Bangalore South	1.1	11997	45572	41071
164	Vidyapeetha	Shamala Saikumar	Bharatiya Janata Party	10539	Kathyayini	Indian National Congress	3434	7105	Basavanagudi	Bangalore South	1.2	11425	43483	35279
165	Ganesh Mandira	D H Lakshmi	Bharatiya Janata Party	5344	Nagarathna	Janata Dal (Secular)	4488	856	Padmanabhanagar	Bangalore South	1.6	6472	25998	15979
166	Karisandra	Yashoda Lakshmikanth	Bharatiya Janata Party	6226	Jyothishree Hari Reddy	Indian National Congress	5464	762	Padmanabhanagar	Bangalore South	1.1	6492	27040	24444
167	Yediyur	Poornima Ramesh	Bharatiya Janata Party	10906	Lakshmi P	Indian National Congress	2722	8184	Padmanabhanagar	Bangalore South	1.2	8455	32756	26683
168	Pattabhiramnagar	H C Nagarathna Murthy	Bharatiya Janata Party	8032	Lakshmi Chandrashekhar Raju	Indian National Congress	2635	5397	Jayanagar	Bangalore South	1.7	7163	28353	16438
169	Byrasandra	N Nagaraju	Bharatiya Janata Party	6985	A Mohd Rasool	Indian National Congress	3872	3113	Jayanagar	Bangalore South	0.9	7423	32066	36971
170	Jayanagar East	R Govinda Naidu	Bharatiya Janata Party	5468	Samuilla	Indian National Congress	4757	711	Jayanagar	Bangalore South	1.0	7961	33927	32869
171	Gurappanapalya	Mohammad Rizwan Nawab	Indian National Congress	12674	Zameer Pasha	Janata Dal (Secular)	5279	7395	Jayanagar	Bangalore South	0.7	11517	42624	72068
172	Madiwala	B N Manjunath Reddy	Indian National Congress	6573	N Babu	Bharatiya Janata Party	5398	1175	B.T.M Layout	Bangalore South	1.2	11517	42694	36612
173	Jakkasandra	Saraswathamma	Bharatiya Janata Party	6566	Lakshmi R	Indian National Congress	5357	1209	B.T.M Layout	Bangalore South	1.5	9040	33521	22020
174	HSR Layout	Gurumurthy Reddy	Bharatiya Janata Party	13854	K Ramesh	Indian National Congress	7886	5968	Bommanahalli	Bangalore South	7.1	16847	63033	8879
175	Bommanahalli	C R Rajmohan Raju	Bharatiya Janata Party	10910	Syed Sardar	Indian National Congress	7660	3250	Bommanahalli	Bangalore South	1.8	11368	43585	23819
176	BTM Layout	K Devadas	Janata Dal (Secular)	5773	H K Mutthappa	Bharatiya Janata Party	5390	383	B.T.M Layout	Bangalore South	2.1	14540	52250	24688
177	J. P. Nagar	K N Lakshmi Nataraj	Bharatiya Janata Party	6854	Asha	Indian National Congress	3865	2989	Jayanagar	Bangalore South	1.8	7566	28846	15915
178	Sarakki	Deepika Manjunatha Reddy	Bharatiya Janata Party	7068	Manjula Arun Kumar	Indian National Congress	4414	2654	Jayanagar	Bangalore South	1.3	7985	31034	23305
179	Shakambarinagar	M Malathi	Bharatiya Janata Party	6904	Anuradha Devaraju	Indian National Congress	319	6585	Jayanagar	Bangalore South	1.9	6537	25871	13946
180	Banashankari Temple	S Ansar Pasha	Indian National Congress	10998	H Basavaraj	Bharatiya Janata Party	7236	3762	Padmanabhanagar	Bangalore South	0.7	9461	42171	61696
181	Kumaraswamy Layout	L Srinivas	Bharatiya Janata Party	9670	T Pramod Kumar	Indian National Congress	4611	5059	Padmanabhanagar	Bangalore South	1.8	11881	47182	25514
182	Padmanabhanagar	L Shobha Anjanappa	Bharatiya Janata Party	8500	V B Triveni Babu	Janata Dal (Secular)	4040	4460	Padmanabhanagar	Bangalore South	1.7	10771	41037	24311
183	Chikkalasandra	Supriya Shekhar	Bharatiya Janata Party	8328	G Kavitha	Janata Dal (Secular)	7242	1086	Padmanabhanagar	Bangalore South	1.1	11403	43364	39948
184	Uttarahalli	Hanumantaiah'	Bharatiya Janata Party	17446	Varaprasad Reddy	Indian National Congress	10009	7437	Bangalore South	Bangalore Rural	9.9	14675	57209	5759
185	Yelachenahalli	V Balakrishna	Bharatiya Janata Party	7754	O Manjunath	Indian National Congress	7561	193	Bangalore South	Bangalore Rural	1.6	11338	46943	29234
186	Jaraganahalli	B M Shobha	Bharatiya Janata Party	8466	Vinitha G	Indian National Congress	6214	2252	Bommanahalli	Bangalore South	1.3	9818	38294	29756
187	Puttenahalli	R Prabhavati Ramesh	Bharatiya Janata Party	12025	Susheela Gurudev	Indian National Congress	8365	3660	Bommanahalli	Bangalore South	2.9	13230	49207	17137
188	Bilekahalli	K Narayan Raju	Bharatiya Janata Party	9820	Ashwathnarayana Swami	Indian National Congress	9002	818	Bommanahalli	Bangalore South	4.3	13186	49884	11721
189	Hongasandra	Bharathi Ramachandra	Bharatiya Janata Party	Elected unopposed	-	-	-	-	Bommanahalli	Bangalore South	2.1	18192	68554	32066
190	Mangammanapalya	Shobha Jagadish	Indian National Congress	14439	Mala Srinivas Reddy	Bharatiya Janata Party	11457	2982	Bommanahalli	Bangalore South	3.5	16903	65890	18956
191	Singasandra	V Shantha	Bharatiya Janata Party	15276	Vanitha Venkataswamy	Indian National Congress	11719	3557	Bangalore South	Bangalore Rural	9.7	18214	71004	7283
192	Begur	M Anjinappa	Indian National Congress	15004	C Srinivas	Bharatiya Janata Party	13129	1875	Bangalore South	Bangalore Rural	19.0	21322	80037	4216
193	Arakere	Bhagyalakshmi	Bharatiya Janata Party	13867	Uma Srinivas Reddy	Indian National Congress	7030	6837	Bommanahalli	Bangalore South	6.6	15272	58355	8810
194	Gottigere	Lalitha T Narayan	Bharatiya Janata Party	10461	Radha M	Indian National Congress	8427	2034	Bangalore South	Bangalore Rural	7.4	13457	51911	7049
195	Konanakunte	Shashirekha Jayaram	Bharatiya Janata Party	12179	Chamapaka K	Indian National Congress	8040	4139	Bangalore South	Bangalore Rural	3.4	14984	57335	16761
196	Anjanapura	K Somashekhar	Bharatiya Janata Party	10057	Gangadhar	Indian National Congress	8989	1068	Bangalore South	Bangalore Rural	11.4	11049	45608	3997
197	Vasanthapura	Shobha Gowda	Indian National Congress	13593	A Vijaya Ramesh	Bharatiya Janata Party	11444	2149	Bangalore South	Bangalore Rural	5.7	16079	62057	10852
198	Hemmigepura	Arya Srinivas	Indian National Congress	9876	G H Ramachandra	Bharatiya Janata Party	8743	1133	Yeshvanthapura	Bangalore North	30.5	12687	50440	1652

=== Results summary ===
Parties and coalitions	Popular vote			Seats	
Parties and coalitions	Votes	%	±pp	Won	+/−
Bharatiya Janata Party (Bharatiya Janata Party)				100	▼11
Indian National Congress (Indian National Congress)				76	▲10
Janata Dal (Secular) (Janata Dal (Secular)				14	▼2
Independents (IND)				7	▲1
SDPI				1	▲1
Other parties and candidates				0	
Total		100.00		198	±0
Valid votes	36,13,831	100			
Invalid votes	0	0			
Votes cast / turnout	36,13,831	49.31			
Abstentions	33,63,177	50.69			
Registered voters	73,28,578				

== By-elections ==
Date of election	Result announcement date	Ward No.	Ward Name	Previous Winner	Party	By-election Winner	Party	Votes Polled	Polling Percentage	By-election Runner	Party	Votes Polled	Margin	Reason for vacancy	Area (km^{2})	Population		Popn density	
Date of election	Result announcement date	Ward No.	Ward Name	Previous Winner	Party	By-election Winner	Party	Votes Polled	Polling Percentage	By-election Runner	Party	Votes Polled	Margin	Reason for vacancy	Area (km^{2})	2001	2011	2001	2011
20 November 2016	23 November 2016	146	Lakkasandra	Mahesh Babu	Bharatiya Janata Party	Sarala Mahesh Babu	Bharatiya Janata Party	7638	45.47%	Mohan	Indian National Congress	5224	2414	Death	1.3	28303	30667	21772	23689
18 June 2018	20 June 2018	121	Binnipete	Mahadevamma Nagaraj	Indian National Congress	Aishwarya	Janata Dal (Secular)	7188	43.54%	Srividya Shashikumar	Indian National Congress	5249	1939	Death	0.8	33946	37354	42433	48081
29 May 2019	31 May 2019	60	Sagayarapuram	V. Elumalai	Independent	V. Palaniyammal	Indian National Congress	7182	44.83%	Marimuthu	Independent	4143	3039	Death	0.8	34874	35334	43593	45792
29 May 2019	31 May 2019	103	Kaveripura	R Ramila	Janata Dal (Secular)	C. Pallavi	Bharatiya Janata Party	9507	39.54%	S. Susheela	Janata Dal (Secular)	9429	78	Death	1.7	35256	53532	20739	32357

== See also ==
- Elections in Karnataka
- Bangalore Mahanagara Palike
- List of wards in Bangalore
- List of wards in Bangalore (1995-2006)
- List of wards in Bangalore (2010-2020)
