= Bangalore South Lok Sabha constituency =

Constituency in Karnataka, India

Coordinates: 12.76°N 77.60°E

Bangalore South
- Lok Sabha constituency
- Bengaluru South Lok Sabha Constituency map

Constituency details
- Country: India
- Region: South India
- State: Karnataka
- Assembly constituencies: Govindraj Nagar; Vijay Nagar; Chickpet; Basavanagudi; Padmanabhanagar; B.T.M. Layout; Jayanagar; Bommanahalli
- Established: 1977
- Reservation: None

Member of Parliament
- 18th Lok Sabha
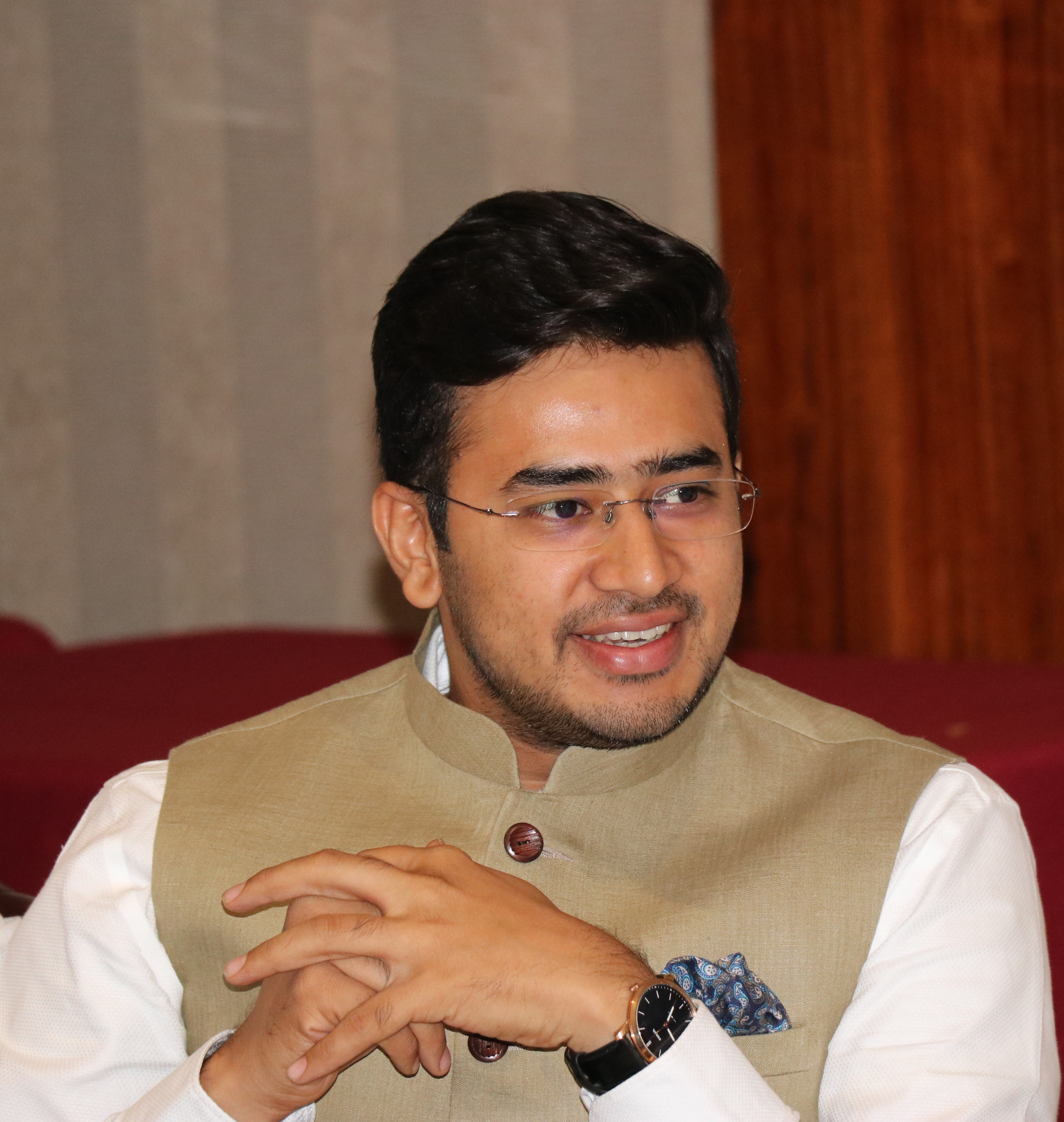
- Incumbent L. S. Tejasvi Surya
- Party: Bharatiya Janata Party
- Elected year: 2024

Bangalore South Lok Sabha constituency is one of the 28 Lok Sabha (Parliamentary) constituencies in Karnataka state, in Southern India. Currently the seat is held by Tejasvi Surya of the Bharatiya Janata Party who won against Sowmya Reddy of the Indian National Congress by a margin of 277083 votes in the 2024 Indian general election.

== Assembly segments ==
At present, Bangalore South Lok Sabha constituency comprises the following 8 Legislative Assembly segments:

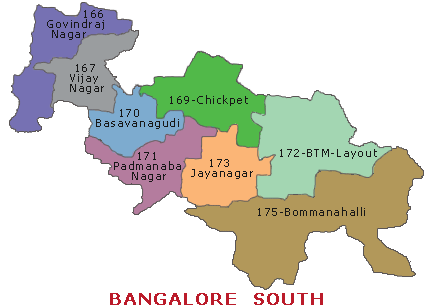

No	Name	District	Member	Party	Party Leading (in 2024)
166	Govindrajanagara	Bangalore Urban	Priya Krishna	INC	BJP
167	Vijayanagara	Bangalore Urban	M. Krishnappa	INC	BJP
169	Chickpet	Bangalore Urban	Uday B. Garudachar	BJP	INC
170	Basavanagudi	Bangalore Urban	L. A. Ravi Subramanya	BJP	BJP
171	Padmanabhanagara	Bangalore Urban	R. Ashoka	BJP	BJP
172	B.T.M. Layout	Bangalore Urban	Ramalinga Reddy	INC	BJP
173	Jayanagar	Bangalore Urban	C. K. Ramamurthy	BJP	INC
175	Bommanahalli	Bangalore Urban	Satish Reddy	BJP	BJP

== Members of Parliament ==
Year	Member	Party
1951	T. Madiah Gowda	Indian National Congress
1957-1977 : Seat did not exist. See Bangalore City and Bangalore
1977	K. S. Hegde	Janata Party
1980	T. R. Shamanna	Janata Party
1984	V. S. Krishna Iyer	Janata Party
1989	R. Gundu Rao	Indian National Congress
1991	K. Venkatagiri Gowda	Bharatiya Janata Party
1996	Ananth Kumar	Bharatiya Janata Party
1998	Ananth Kumar	Bharatiya Janata Party
1999	Ananth Kumar	Bharatiya Janata Party
2004	Ananth Kumar	Bharatiya Janata Party
2009	Ananth Kumar	Bharatiya Janata Party
2014	Ananth Kumar	Bharatiya Janata Party
2019	L. S. Tejasvi Surya	Bharatiya Janata Party
2024	L. S. Tejasvi Surya	Bharatiya Janata Party

== History of the constituency ==
Post independence Bangalore south constituency used to come under Mysore state. Mysore state was a state within the Union of India from 1947 until 1956. T. Madiah Gowda, freedom fighter, a lawyer by profession won in 1st lok sabha election from Bangalore south constituency.

As a result of the States Reorganisation Act on 1 November 1956 few constituencies were added to Karnataka state and Bangalore north and Bangalore south constituencies were merged to make Bangalore constituency. H.C Dasappa got elected from Bangalore constituency from 1957 to 1962. He also served as the Railway Minister of India under Jawaharlal Nehru in 1963-64. Later former Chief Minister Kengal Hanumanthiah won this constituency three consecutive times.

Post Emergency and reorganization of constituencies across the country, this Lok Sabha seat came into existence as Bangalore South in 1977. Since then this constituency has gone to the polls 12 times. BJP has won 8 times, Janata Party 3 times and Congress just once. BJP leader Ananth Kumar won 6 consecutive terms from this constituency.

In 1977, K S Hegde (incidentally his son is the famous retired judge of Supreme Court, Santosh Hegde) won this seat against former Chief Minister Kengal Hanumanthiah (who was instrumental in building Vidhana Soudha). He was a former judge of the Supreme Court who resigned in the mid 70's when he and 2 other judges were superseded in the Supreme Court, apparently for their past judgments against the government of the day. This was the only seat other than Hassan won by the Janata party in Karnataka. He went on to be the first non Congress Speaker of the Lok Sabha and was known for his disciplined and non-partisan tenure.

In 1980, T. R. Shamanna, freedom fighter, an educationist, 4 time MLA before, and better known as Cycle Shamanna won the seat by Janata Party in that election. This was the only parliamentary seat won by Janata Party in Karnataka in that election. In this elections of 1980, Congress came back to power at the center with Indira Gandhi back at the helm.

In 1984, V. S. Krishna Iyer won the elections. The elections were necessitated due to the murder of Indira Gandhi sitting prime minister. Rajiv Gandhi called for elections and Congress went on to win a landslide. V. S. Krishna Iyer, a Gandhian, Congressman who later joined Congress (O) and then Janata. He was an ex Mayor of Bangalore and was responsible for sanctioning the Cauvery water supply scheme for Bangalore city. He was instrumental in founding of Yuvakasangha along with Gandhian V Annaiah in 1946 in Bangalore which popularized free tuition classes for 10th standard students apart from B.Com students.

1989 elections saw the Congress winning the seat for the first time with former Karnataka Chief Minister R. Gundu Rao winning the elections defeating V. S. Krishna Iyer. This is the only time that Congress has won the elections in this constituency.

1991 elections were necessitated when the Chandra Shekhar led government fell and elections were called. BJP fielded noted economist K Venkatagiri Gowda. He defeated the incumbent MP R. Gundu Rao and thus BJP won the elections for the 1st time in Bangalore South. BJP won 4 seats in this elections from Karnataka.

In 1996, BJP fielded an young candidate Ananth Kumar who won the elections against Varalakshmi Gundu Rao, wife of R Gundu Rao. He went on to win 5 consecutive elections. Interestingly all his nearest opponents were different candidates but they were all from Congress. Till the rise of Ananth Kumar the seat was won by legal luminaries, freedom fighters, Chief Minister and senior Economists. Ananth Kumar went on to become one of the most powerful and influential politicians from Karnataka, serving both the Vajpayee government and the Modi government in multiple capacities.

Ananth Kumar succumbed to cancer in 2018 during the course of the 16th Lok Sabha, and in 2019, BJP was forced to field a new face due to his untimely death. Tejasvi Surya went on to win with over 3.3 lakh votes and at the age of 29 became one of the youngest MPs in the 17th Lok Sabha.

== Election results ==
Vote share of Winning candidates
2024	60.10%
2019	62.20%
2014	56.91%
2009	48.20%
2004	48.30%
1999	50.99%
1998	53.83%
1996	35.08%
1991	46.01%
1989	57.34%
1984	47.58%
1980	45.76%
1977	53.04%
1951	51.91%

=== 2024 ===
2024 Indian general election: Bangalore South
Party	Candidate	Votes	%	±%
BJP	Tejasvi Surya	750,830	60.10	▼2.10
INC	Sowmya Reddy	473,747	37.92	▲3.59
NOTA	None of the Above	7,857	0.63	▼0.21
Majority		277,083	22.18	▼5.69
Turnout		1,250,052	53.38	▼0.32
BJP hold		Swing		

=== 2019 ===
2019 Indian general election: Bangalore South
Party	Candidate	Votes	%	±%
BJP	L. S. Tejasvi Surya	739,229	62.20	▲5.29
INC	B. K. Hariprasad	408,037	34.33	▼2.06
NOTA	None of the Above	9,938	0.84	▲0.17
IND	14 Independent Candidates	13,570	1.14	
OTH	9 Other Party Candidates	17,717	1.49	
Majority		331,192	27.87	▲7.35
Turnout		1,189,657	53.70	▼2.05
BJP hold		Swing		

=== 2014 ===
2014 Indian general election: Bangalore South
Party	Candidate	Votes	%	±%
BJP	Ananth Kumar	633,816	56.91	▲8.71
INC	Nandan Nilekani	405,241	36.39	▼7.67
JD(S)	Ruth Manorama	25,677	2.31	▼1.00
AAP	Nina Nayak	21,403	1.92	
NOTA	None of the Above	7,414	0.67	
IND	Pramod Muthalik	4,247	0.38	
BSP	R. Khan Abdul	2,747	0.25	▼0.26
IND	11 Independent Candidates	9,619	0.86	
OTH	6 Other Party Candidates	3,562	0.32	
Majority		228,575	20.52	▲16.38
Turnout		1,114,359	55.75	▲10.99
BJP hold		Swing		

=== 2009 ===
2009 Indian general election: Bangalore South
Party	Candidate	Votes	%	±%
BJP	Ananth Kumar	437,953	48.20	▼0.10
INC	Krishna Byre Gowda	400,341	44.06	▲3.54
JD(S)	Prof. K. E. Radhakrishna	30,045	3.31	▼6.38
IND	Capt. G. R. Gopinath	16,383	1.80	
BSP	S. Naheeda Salma	4,621	0.51	
IND	11 Independent Candidates	15,552	1.71	
OTH	4 Other Party Candidates	3,695	0.41	
Majority		37,612	4.14	▼3.64
Turnout		909,065	44.76	▼4.65
BJP hold		Swing		

=== 2004 ===
2004 Indian general election: Bangalore South
Party	Candidate	Votes	%	±%
BJP	Ananth Kumar	386,682	48.30	▼2.69
INC	M. M. Krishnappa	324,411	40.52	▼2.26
JD(S)	Jayanthi	77,551	9.69	▲6.86
IND	S. V. Srinivasa Rao	5,012	0.63	
IND	G. H. Paksha Rangaswamy	3,304	0.41	
IND	Dr. B. R. Manjunath	1,934	0.24	
IND	Bhadrappa	1,755	0.22	
Majority		62,271	7.78	▼0.43
Turnout		800,649	49.41	▼4.72
BJP hold		Swing		

=== 1999 ===
1999 Indian general election: Bangalore South
Party	Candidate	Votes	%	±%
BJP	Ananth Kumar	410,161	50.99	▼2.84
INC	B. K. Hari Prasad	344,107	42.78	▲11.51
JD(S)	B. T. Parthasarathy	22,801	2.83	
AIADMK	D. Arumugam	11,643	1.45	
IND	Dr. B. R. Manjunath	11,636	1.45	
IND	G. H. Paksha Rangaswamy	3,994	0.50	
Majority		66,054	8.21	▼14.35
Turnout		805,034	54.13	▼3.82
BJP hold		Swing		

=== 1998 ===
1998 Indian general election: Bangalore South
Party	Candidate	Votes	%	±%
BJP	Ananth Kumar	429,648	53.83	▲18.75
INC	D. P. Sharma	249,601	31.27	▼0.74
JD	V. Somanna	110,323	13.82	▼11.57
SAP	B. S. Rajput	2,688	0.34	
KVP	Abbas Ali Bohra	704	0.09	
RJD	S. V. Ramanna	592	0.07	
IND	5 Independent Candidates	4,579	0.57	
Majority		180,047	22.56	▲19.49
Turnout		810,135	57.95	▲2.03
BJP hold		Swing		

=== 1996 ===
1996 Indian general election: Bangalore South
Party	Candidate	Votes	%	±%
BJP	Ananth Kumar	251,235	35.08	▼10.93
INC	Varalakshmi Gundurao	229,267	32.01	▼9.44
JD	M. Raghupathy	181,826	25.39	▲14.46
KCVP	Vatal Nagaraj	28,989	4.05	
IND	26 Independent Candidates	21,216	2.98	
OTH	5 Other Party Candidates	3,676	0.51	
Majority		21,968	3.07	▼1.49
Turnout		727,220	55.92	▲10.22
BJP hold		Swing		

=== 1991 ===
1991 Indian general election: Bangalore South
Party	Candidate	Votes	%	±%
BJP	K. Venkatgiri Gowda	275,083	46.01	▲37.28
INC	R. Gundu Rao	247,835	41.45	▼15.89
JD	V. S. Krishna Iyer	65,356	10.93	▼13.16
IND	22 Independent Candidates	5,537	0.91	
OTH	8 Other Party Candidates	4,094	0.69	
Majority		27,248	4.56	▼28.69
Turnout		607,128	45.70	▼11.00
BJP gain from INC		Swing		

=== 1989 ===
1989 Indian general election: Bangalore South
Party	Candidate	Votes	%	±%
INC	R. Gundu Rao	413,574	57.34	▲12.05
JD	M. Raghupathy	173,720	24.09	
BJP	Ramachandra Gowda	62,936	8.73	
JP	M. S. Narayana Rao	45,242	6.27	▼41.31
IND	Jayakumar	8,488	1.18	
IND	17 Independent Candidates	14,821	2.06	
OTH	2 Other Party Candidates	2,460	0.34	
Majority		239,854	33.25	▲30.96
Turnout		744,332	56.70	▼0.42
INC gain from JP		Swing		

=== 1984 ===
1984 Indian general election: Bangalore South
Party	Candidate	Votes	%	±%
JP	V. S. Krishna Iyer	264,765	47.58	▲1.82
INC	K. Venkatagiri Gowda	252,033	45.29	▲0.16
LKD	A. K. Subbaiah	13,441	2.42	
IND	28 Independent Candidates	26,188	4.66	
Majority		12,732	2.29	▲1.66
Turnout		563,908	57.12	▲5.90
JP hold		Swing		

=== 1980 ===
1980 Indian general election: Bangalore South
Party	Candidate	Votes	%	±%
JP	T. R. Shamanna	198,390	45.76	▼7.28
INC(I)	D. P. Sharma	195,663	45.13	▲1.92
CPI	M. S. Krishnan	26,999	6.23	▲4.80
SUCI	B. A. Rajarao Shinde	742	0.17	
IND	16 Independent Candidates	11,742	2.70	
Majority		2,727	0.63	▼9.20
Turnout		441,603	51.22	▼13.00
JP hold		Swing		

=== 1977 ===
1977 Indian general election: Bangalore South
Party	Candidate	Votes	%	±%
JP	K. S. Hegde	221,974	53.04	
INC	K. Hanumanthaiah	180,809	43.21	
IND	G. Rangaswamy	6,586	1.57	
CPI	M. C. Narasimhan	5,991	1.43	
IND	Mahendra Desai	1,292	0.31	
IND	C. Mahadevaswamy	1,086	0.26	
IND	M. V. Krishna Murthy	752	0.18	
Majority		41,165	9.83	
Turnout		426,595	64.22	
JP gain from INC		Swing		

=== 1951 ===
1951–52 Indian general election: Bangalore South
Party	Candidate	Votes	%	±%
INC	T. Madiah Gowda	80,951	51.91	
KMPP	K. Srinivasa Rao	36,766	23.58	
ABJS	B. N. Vijayadeva	19,547	12.53	
IND	L. Srinivasa Reddy	18,684	11.98	
Majority		44,185	28.33	
Turnout		155,948	45.09	
INC win (new seat)				

== See also ==
- Bangalore
- List of constituencies of the Lok Sabha
