= B. N. Vijaya Kumar =

Indian politician

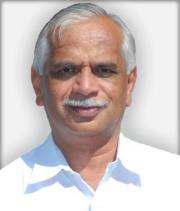

Member of the Karnataka Legislative Assembly
- In office 2008 – 4 May 2018
- Preceded by: Ramalinga Reddy
- Succeeded by: Soumya Reddy
- Constituency: Jayanagar

Personal details
- Born: 7 July 1958
- Died: 4 May 2018 (aged 59); Bangalore, India
- Political party: Bharatiya Janata Party

B. N. Vijaya Kumar (October 1958 – 4 May 2018) was an Indian politician who was a Member of the Legislative Assembly representing Jayanagar in Bangalore. Kumar was a member of the Bharatiya Janata Party, having joined in 1990.

== Biography ==
Vijaya Kumar was born in October 1958. He completed schooling in HAL School and RV High School, and graduated in BE Civil Engineering from the BMS College of Engineering, Bangalore. He joined the Bharatiya Janata Party in 1990.

He was General Secretary of Bangalore City BJP for almost 12 years. He was representing Jayanagar Assembly Constituency. He was also President of BJP for Bangalore city unit. He was elected 2 times in a row as MLA from Jayanagar Constituency.

He had started many developmental projects in his constituency, including the Swacha Bharat campaign of Government of India.

He died after a massive heart attack on 4 May 2018.

== Sources ==
- "From Jayanagar Academic Committee". Archived from the original on 4 February 2013.
- R, Aarthi (11 September 2008). "Jayanagar MLA harvests water in backyard". The Times Of India.
