= C. K. Ramamurthy =

Indian politician

Member of Karnataka Legislative Assembly
- Incumbent
- Assumed office 22 May 2023
- Preceded by: Soumya Reddy
- Constituency: Jayanagar

Personal details
- Born: 1966 (age 59–60)
- Party: Bharatiya Janata Party
- Education: BSE College, Bangalore

C. K. Ramamurthy is an Indian politician from Karnataka, currently serving as the Member of the Legislative Assembly in Karnataka Legislative Assembly from Jayanagar Assembly constituency. He defeated his nearest rival Soumya Reddy by just 16 votes in 2023 Karnataka Legislative Assembly election. He was formerly a corporator in Bruhat Bengaluru Mahanagara Palike.

== Political career ==
Under the guidance and influence of Late B. N. Vijaya Kumar joined BJP during 1990 Ram Janmabhoomi Rath Yatra undertaken by L. K. Advani and since have been actively involved in Bharatiya Janata Party. He participated as Karsevak at Ayodhya during December 1992 Babri Masjid demolition, 1994 Hubli Eidgah Maidan protest at Hubli and in the Kashmir Chalo Movement led By Murali Manohar Joshi in January 1992.

He Contested 2 Terms as BJP Candidate for BMP and BBMP councillor elections for ward No 58 & 168 during 1996 and 2010 respectively and won both the elections successfully. He was elected as chairman, Town Planning and Development Standing committee, BBMP In 2011–12.

== Positions held ==
Sl.no	Year	Position
1.	1991-1993	BJP Yuva Morcha Vice President, Jayanagar Assembly
2.	1993-1996	BJP Secretary, Jayanagar Assembly
3.	2004-2007	BJP General Secretary, Jayanagar Assembly
4.	2008-2011	BJP President, Jayanagar Assembly
5.	2014-2017	BJP Slum Morcha, State General Secretary
6.	2017-2018	BJP Bangalore City, Vice President
7.	2018-2019	BJP Bangalore City, General Secretary
8.	2023 – present	Member of Legislative Assembly from Jayanagar Assembly constituency
9.	2023 – present	Karnataka State BJP Executive Member

== Electoral statistics ==
Year	Constituency	Party	Result	Votes	Opposition Candidate	Opposition Party	Opposition votes	Margin
2023	Jayanagar	BJP	Won	57,797	Soumya Reddy	INC	57,781	16
