= M. Satish Reddy =

Indian politician

Government Chief Whip Karnataka Legislative Assembly
- Incumbent
- Assumed office 13 September 2021
- Chief Minister: Basavaraj Bommai
- Preceded by: V. Sunil Kumar

Member of Karnataka Legislative Assembly
- Incumbent
- Assumed office 2008
- Preceded by: Constituency created
- Constituency: Bommanahalli

Personal details
- Born: 12 December 1972 (age 52); Hongasandra, Bangalore
- Political party: Bharatiya Janata Party
- Spouse: Asha
- Children: 1 son, 1 daughter
- Parent: C. Munireddy (father)

M. Satish Reddy is an Indian politician and member of the Bharatiya Janata Party. Reddy is a member of the Karnataka Legislative Assembly from the Bommanahalli constituency in Bangalore Urban district.
