= B.T.M Layout Assembly constituency =

Legislative Assembly constituency in Karnataka state, India

Coordinates: 12.92°N 77.6°E

B.T.M. Layout
- Constituency No. 172 for the Karnataka Legislative Assembly

Constituency details
- Country: India
- Region: South India
- State: Karnataka
- District: Bangalore Urban
- Lok Sabha constituency: Bangalore South
- Established: 2008
- Total electors: 275,067
- Reservation: None

Member of Legislative Assembly
- 16th Karnataka Legislative Assembly
- Incumbent Ramalinga Reddy
- Party: Indian National Congress
- Elected year: 2023

BTM Layout Assembly constituency is one of the 224 constituencies in the Karnataka Legislative Assembly of Karnataka a south state of India. It is also part of Bangalore South Lok Sabha constituency. It is in Bangalore Urban district.

== Members of the Legislative Assembly ==
Election	Member	Party
2008	Ramalinga Reddy	Indian National Congress
2013	Ramalinga Reddy	Indian National Congress
2018	Ramalinga Reddy	Indian National Congress
2023	Ramalinga Reddy	Indian National Congress

== Election results ==
=== Assembly Election 2023 ===
2023 Karnataka Legislative Assembly election : B.T.M Layout
Party	Candidate	Votes	%	±%
INC	Ramalinga Reddy	68,557	50.70%	▲1.35
BJP	K. R. Sridhara	59,335	43.88%	New
JD(S)	M. Venkatesha	1,841	1.36%	New
AAP	Srinivasa Reddy. M	1,055	0.78%	New
UPP	Nagendrarao	976	0.72%	New
NOTA	None of the above	1,785	1.32%	▼0.42
Margin of victory		9,222	6.82%	▼8.24
Turnout		135,231	49.16%	▼1.09
Total valid votes		135,231		
Registered electors		275,067		▲1.69
INC hold		Swing	▲1.35	

=== Assembly Election 2018 ===
2018 Karnataka Legislative Assembly election : B.T.M Layout
Party	Candidate	Votes	%	±%
INC	Ramalinga Reddy	67,085	49.35%	▼23.60
BJP	Lallesh Reddy	46,607	34.29%	New
JD(S)	K Devadas	17,307	12.73%	New
NOTA	None of the above	2,365	1.74%	New
Margin of victory		20,478	15.06%	▼36.26
Turnout		135,939	50.25%	▼3.18
Total valid votes		135,932		
Registered electors		270,500		▲30.69
INC hold		Swing	▼23.60	

=== Assembly Election 2013 ===
2013 Karnataka Legislative Assembly election : B.T.M Layout
Party	Candidate	Votes	%	±%
INC	Ramalinga Reddy	69,712	72.95%	▲26.69
BJP	N. Sudhakar	20,664	21.62%	New
JD(S)	J. Ramesh Reddy	8,346	8.73%	New
LSP	Ravi Krishna Reddy	6,596	6.90%	New
KJP	Srinivasa	1,902	1.99%	New
Independent	R. Ravindrakumar	1,324	1.39%	New
BSP	Hariram. A	1,311	1.37%	New
Margin of victory		49,048	51.32%	▲49.48
Turnout		110,589	53.43%	▲6.67
Total valid votes		95,565		
Registered electors		206,974		▼4.35
INC hold		Swing	▲26.69	

=== Assembly Election 2008 ===
2008 Karnataka Legislative Assembly election : B.T.M Layout
Party	Candidate	Votes	%	±%
INC	Ramalinga Reddy	46,811	46.26%	New
BJP	G. Prasad Reddy	44,954	44.43%	New
JD(S)	Mohan. B	6,031	5.96%	New
BSP	A. Papanna	1,043	1.03%	New
Independent	Ramalinga Reddy	783	0.77%	New
Margin of victory		1,857	1.84%	
Turnout		101,184	46.76%	
Total valid votes		101,182		
Registered electors		216,392		
INC win (new seat)				

== See also ==
- Bangalore Urban district
- List of constituencies of Karnataka Legislative Assembly
