= Bommanahalli Assembly constituency =

Constituency of the Karnataka legislative assembly in India

Coordinates: 12.902°N 77.621°E

Bommanahalli
- Constituency No. 175 for the Karnataka Legislative Assembly

Constituency details
- Country: India
- Region: South India
- State: Karnataka
- District: Bangalore Urban
- Lok Sabha constituency: Bangalore South
- Established: 2008
- Total electors: 452,808 (2023)
- Reservation: None

Member of Legislative Assembly
- 16th Karnataka Legislative Assembly
- Incumbent M. Satish Reddy
- Party: Bharatiya Janata Party
- Elected year: 2023

Bommanahalli Assembly constituency is one of the 225 constituencies in the Karnataka Legislative Assembly of Karnataka, a southern state of India. Bommanahalli is also part of Bangalore South Lok Sabha constituency.

== Members of the Legislative Assembly ==
Election	Member	Party
2008	M. Satish Reddy	Bharatiya Janata Party
2013	M. Satish Reddy	Bharatiya Janata Party
2018	M. Satish Reddy	Bharatiya Janata Party
2023	M. Satish Reddy	Bharatiya Janata Party

== Election results ==
=== Assembly Election 2023 ===
2023 Karnataka Legislative Assembly election : Bommanahalli
Party	Candidate	Votes	%	±%
BJP	M. Satish Reddy	113,574	52.82%	▼4.40
INC	Umapathy Srinivasa Gowda	89,359	41.56%	▲8.47
JD(S)	K. Narayan Raju	3,445	1.60%	▼3.20
NOTA	None of the above	2,456	1.14%	▼0.13
AAP	Sitharamu	1,989	0.92%	New
UPP	Mamatha. R	1,819	0.85%	New
Margin of victory		24,215	11.26%	▼12.86
Turnout		215,066	47.50%	▲0.28
Total valid votes		215,037		
Registered electors		452,808		▲9.35
BJP hold		Swing	▼4.40	

=== Assembly Election 2018 ===
2018 Karnataka Legislative Assembly election : Bommanahalli
Party	Candidate	Votes	%	±%
BJP	M. Satish Reddy	111,863	57.22%	▲22.70
INC	Sushma Rajagopala Reddy	64,701	33.09%	▲8.88
JD(S)	T. R. Prasad	9,379	4.80%	▲0.56
NOTA	None of the above	2,491	1.27%	New
Praja Parivartan Party	Somashekar. N	2,142	1.10%	New
Margin of victory		47,162	24.12%	▲13.81
Turnout		195,542	47.22%	▼6.87
Total valid votes		195,510		
Registered electors		414,080		▲28.14
BJP hold		Swing	▲22.70	

=== Assembly Election 2013 ===
2013 Karnataka Legislative Assembly election : Bommanahalli
Party	Candidate	Votes	%	±%
BJP	M. Satish Reddy	86,552	34.52%	▼17.37
INC	Nagabhushana. C	60,700	24.21%	▼16.45
LSP	Dr. Ashwin Mahesh	11,915	4.75%	New
JD(S)	R. Sharaschandra (babu)	10,621	4.24%	▼0.96
KJP	B. Ramesh Reddy	1,832	0.73%	New
Margin of victory		25,852	10.31%	▼0.93
Turnout		174,773	54.09%	▲9.74
Total valid votes		250,737		
Registered electors		323,143		▲18.04
BJP hold		Swing	▼17.37	

=== Assembly Election 2008 ===
2008 Karnataka Legislative Assembly election : Bommanahalli
Party	Candidate	Votes	%	±%
BJP	M. Satish Reddy	62,993	51.89%	New
INC	Kupendra Reddy. D	49,353	40.66%	New
JD(S)	Muninarayana. H. M	6,313	5.20%	New
Independent	Sathish Reddy. A	1,141	0.94%	New
BSP	Venkatesh. M	1,059	0.87%	New
Margin of victory		13,640	11.24%	
Turnout		121,405	44.35%	
Total valid votes		121,394		
Registered electors		273,749		
BJP win (new seat)				

== See also ==
- Bommanahalli
- Bangalore Urban district
- List of constituencies of Karnataka Legislative Assembly
