= Ramalinga Reddy =

Indian politician (born 1953)

Ramalinga Reddy MLA
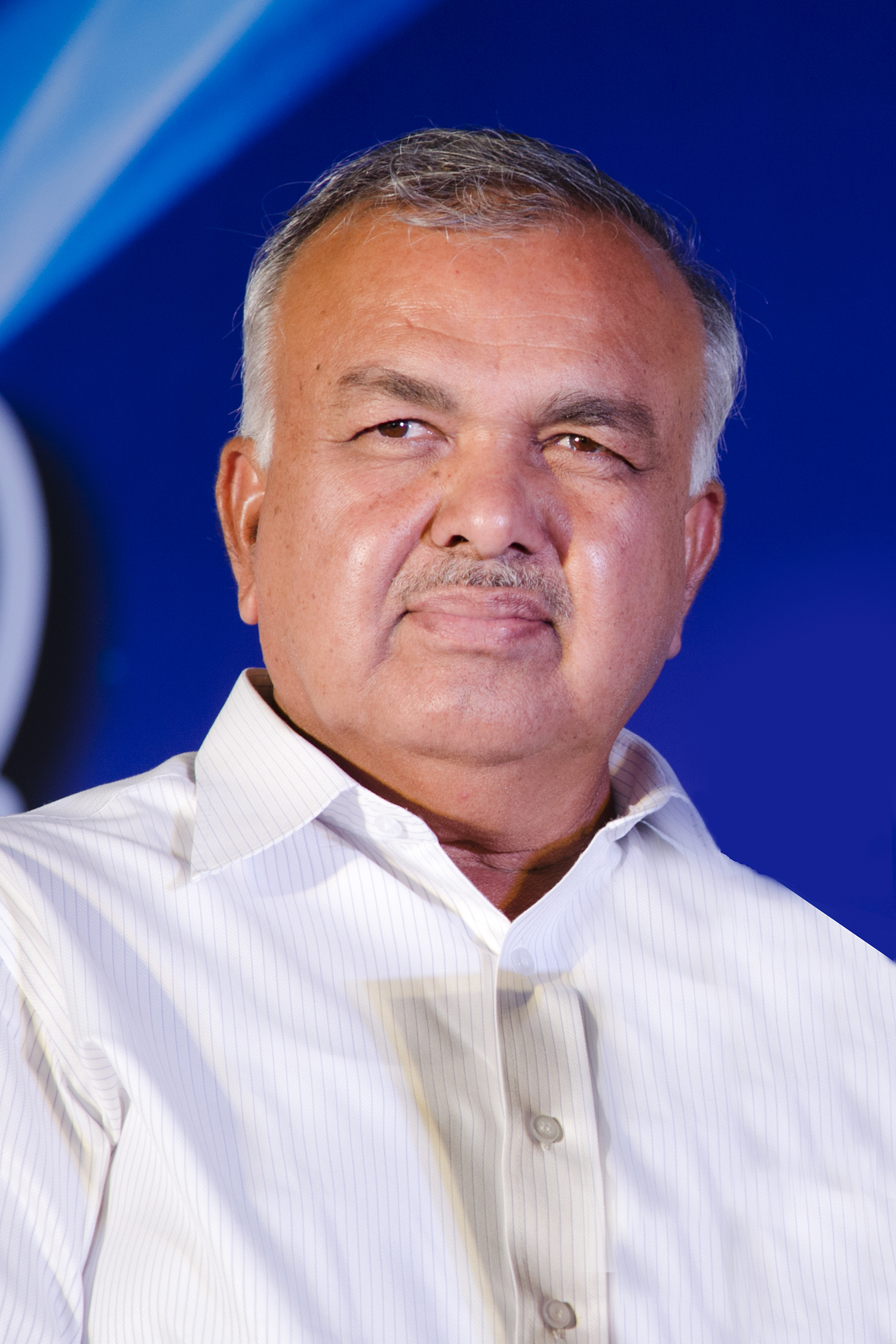

Minister of Forest, Ecology and Environment Government of Karnataka
- Incumbent
- Assumed office 13 August 2026
- Governor: Thawar Chand Gehlot
- Chief Minister: D. K. Shivakumar
- Preceded by: Eshwara Khandre

Minister of Major and Medium Irrigation Government of Karnataka
- In office 03 June 2026 – 13 August 2026
- Governor: Thawar Chand Gehlot
- Chief Minister: D. K. Shivakumar
- Preceded by: D. K. Shivakumar
- Succeeded by: N. Chaluvaraya Swamy

Minister of Transport Government of Karnataka
- In office 20 May 2023 – 29 May 2026
- Chief Minister: Siddaramaiah
- Preceded by: B Sriramulu
- Succeeded by: Byrathi Suresh
- In office 18 May 2013 – 2 September 2017
- Preceded by: R. Ashoka
- Succeeded by: H. M. Revanna

Minister of Muzrai Government of Karnataka
- In office 20 May 2023 – 29 May 2026
- Chief Minister: Siddaramaiah
- Preceded by: Shashikala Jolle

Member of the Karnataka Legislative Assembly
- Incumbent
- Assumed office May 2008
- Preceded by: Constituency Established
- Constituency: B.T.M Layout
- In office 1989–2008
- Preceded by: M. Chandrasekhar
- Succeeded by: B. N. Vijaya Kumar
- Constituency: Jayanagara

Minister of Home Affairs Government of Karnataka
- In office 2 September 2017 – 17 May 2018
- Governor: Vajubhai Rudabhai Vala
- Chief Minister: Siddaramaiah
- Preceded by: Dr. G. Parameshwara
- Succeeded by: Dr. G. Parameshwara
- Constituency: B.T.M Layout

Minister of Primary and Secondary Education & Sakala Government of Karnataka
- In office 2004–2006
- Preceded by: Raja Amareshwara Naik
- Succeeded by: D. H. Shankaramurthy

Minister of Food and Civil Supplies Government of Karnataka
- In office 2002–2004
- Preceded by: D. B. Inamdar
- Succeeded by: H. S. Mahadeva Prasad

Personal details
- Born: 12 June 1953 (age 73) Bengaluru, Karnataka
- Party: Indian National Congress
- Children: Sowmya Reddy; Sriraj Reddy
- Parent(s): B. Venkatareddy (father), Pillamma (mother)
- Education: Bachelor of Science

Ramalinga Reddy (born 12 June 1953) is an Indian politician who was the Minister of Major and Medium Irrigation, Transport Minister and Muzrai Minister of Karnataka. Reddy is the Chairman of Karnataka State Road Transport Corporation. A member of the Indian National Congress, he is the current working president of Karnataka Pradesh Congress Committee since February 2021. He was Minister of State for Home Affairs from 2 September 2017 to 17 May 2018, and Minister of Transport of Karnataka from 18 May 2013 to 2 September 2017, and again, from 20 May 2023.

Reddy contested the Karnataka 2018 election and was re-elected from the BTM Layout constituency again in 2023 and served as Minister for Transport and Hindu Religious and Charitable Endowments in the Siddaramaiah cabinet.

Ramalinga Reddy took oath as minister in D.K. Shiva Kumar's cabinet on 3 June 2026 and later allotted Major and Medium Irrigation projects portfolios. He has resigned amid discontent over his cabinet portfolio on 5 June 2026, he is upset over being denied the Bengaluru Development portfolio.
