= K. E. Radhakrishna =

Indian writer and politician (born 1946)

Vice President, Karnataka Congress
- Constituency: Bengaluru South

Personal details
- Born: 22 December 1946 (age 79) Peraje, Dakshina Kannada
- Party: Indian National Congress, Previously in Janta Dal (S)
- Spouse: Ramadevi Radhakrishna
- Children: 2
- Website: http://radhakrishna.bengalu.ru/
- As of 6 April, 2009

K. E. Radhakrishna (born 22 Dec 1946) is an Indian educationalist, writer, playwright, musicologist, columnist and political leader. He holds an M.A. in English Literature and LLB from Bangalore University.

== Early and family life ==
Radhakrishna is a Hindu Brahmin born to a poor agricultural family in the village of Peraje, Dakshina Kannada district in Karnataka, to parents Eshwarappiah and Kaveramma. After his initial schooling in Dakshina Kannada, he obtained his BA degree in RPD college in Belagavi, MA in English Literature in Central College, Bangalore and LLB from Bangalore University. His wife, Ramadevi Radhakrishna, is a sociology professor at BSVP College for Women in Bangalore.

== Career ==
Beginning career as a teacher in English at Sheshadripuram College, he served as the principal of the college for 20 years and later became the principal of Surana College.

In 2007, he left Surana college and started the Sa-Mudra foundation and currently serves as its managing director. He also assisted in the founding of YUVA helpline, a 24-hour counselling service for distressed students.

=== Works ===
- Kannakadu – Kavya Prabhandha (this book had won Attimobbe Prshasthi and Kannada Sahitya Pradhikara Prashasithi)
- Gopikonmada – Poetry translated from Sanskrit this poem has come in the form of CD

Sung by several important artists of Karnataka and was presented as Dance Drama and popular in YouTube and Wynk. It is translated into music languages of Malayalam, Telugu, Tamil, Tulu, Hindi, Marathi and Bengali.

- Prabhuthva Khathana (the Governance according to Ramanayana)
- Bharithi Samudra – Poetry collection
- Akashadalli Benki- Collection of articles
- Aavarthamana
- Jagatika-Chanduraya
- VishwaGrama
- Mugilagala
- Kalaprasanga
- Waree Nota
- .Maryade Mathu
- Satyappe Balelu (A Collection of Tulu Short Stories as won the best book award 2012 from Karnataka Tulu Sahitya Academy) both in Kannada and Tulu
- Pretham Bhattara Ninthilaru (A novel in Kannada & Tulu)

=== Translations into Kannada ===
- Nandan Nilekani's Imaging India As Bimba Bharatha
- Jairam Ramesh's – Chindia
- Indira Gandhi Life in Nature- as Indira Gandhi Prakriti Sangatya
- Yaru Bharathamaate? Into Kannada (English by Purushottama Agarwal)

=== Translations into English ===
- Jain Mahapurana- 7 Vol- 6000pages- 20000shlokas from Sanskrit to English

(Originally written by Bhagawath Jinasenacharya and Guna Bhadracharya in 16th century and translated into Kannada by Erturu Shantiraja Shastry into Kannada in 1927)

=== As an editor ===
- DVG – Baduku Baraha
- Gopalakrishna Adiga – Anusandhana
- Manjeshwara Govindapai – Samskriti Loka
- Allamna –Anubhava
- Pampaadhyayana
- Kumarvysa Kathana
- Lakmisha Kavya Vaibhava
- Rathnakarvarni Iti-Vrutha
- Reminiscences on Raja Rao and R.K.Narayan (English)
- Jagannnatha Panditha
- Anuhya
- Bhaktikavya in Hindi
- Aaloka

== Political activist ==
He is the Vice President of the Karnataka Pradesh Congress Party, the chairman of Media and Communication cell and the Manifesto Committee for 2013 Karnataka Assemble Elections. He had contested as a JDS candidate from Bengaluru South Parliamentary Constituency and lost to BJP politician Anantakumar. He has held several important positions such as Member of Syndicate, Academic Council, Faculty of Arts and Board of Studies in English, Exam Review Committee, Sports Committee and College Development Council in Bangalore University. He is a member of Karnataka State Women's University Syndicate.
