= Jayanagar Assembly constituency =

Legislative Assembly constituency in Karnataka, India

Coordinates: 12.930°N 77.585°E

Jayanagar
- Constituency No. 173 for the Karnataka Legislative Assembly
- Jayanagar Assembly Constituency situated in Bangalore Urban district

Constituency details
- Country: India
- Region: South India
- State: Karnataka
- Division: Bangalore Division (Revenue Division); Greater Bengaluru (Electoral Division)
- District: Bangalore Urban
- Lok Sabha constituency: Bangalore South
- Established: 1978
- Total electors: 210,079 (2023)
- Reservation: None

Member of Legislative Assembly
- 16th Karnataka Legislative Assembly
- Incumbent C. K. Ramamurthy
- Party: Bharatiya Janata Party
- Alliance: National Democratic Alliance
- Elected year: 2023
- Preceded by: Soumya Reddy

Jayanagar Assembly constituency is one of the 224 constituencies in the Karnataka Legislative Assembly of Karnataka, a southern state of India. It is also part of Bangalore South Lok Sabha constituency.

== Members of the Legislative Assembly ==
Election	Member	Party
1978	M. Chandrasekhar	Janata Party
1983	M. Chandrasekhar	Janata Party
1985	M. Chandrasekhar	Janata Party
1989	Ramalinga Reddy	Indian National Congress
1994	Ramalinga Reddy	Indian National Congress
1999	Ramalinga Reddy	Indian National Congress
2004	Ramalinga Reddy	Indian National Congress
2008	B. N. Vijaya Kumar	Bharatiya Janata Party
2013	B. N. Vijaya Kumar	Bharatiya Janata Party
2018	Sowmya Reddy	Indian National Congress
2023	C. K. Ramamurthy	Bharatiya Janata Party

== Election results ==
=== Assembly election 2023 ===
2023 Karnataka Legislative Assembly election: Jayanagar
Party	Candidate	Votes	%	±%
BJP	C. K. Ramamurthy	57,797	47.87%	▲1.30
INC	Sowmya Reddy	57,781	47.85%	▼1.33
JD(S)	Kalegowda	1,226	1.02%	▲0.28
NOTA	None of the above	1,192	0.99%	▲0.22
Margin of victory		16	0.01%	▼2.60
Turnout		120,820	57.51%	▲2.59
Total valid votes		120,743		
Registered electors		210,079		▲3.39
BJP gain from INC		Swing	▼1.31	

=== Assembly election 2018 ===
2018 Karnataka Legislative Assembly election: Jayanagar
Party	Candidate	Votes	%	±%
INC	Sowmya Reddy	54,458	49.18%	▲35.21
BJP	B. N. Prahlad	51,571	46.57%	▲27.17
Independent	Ravi Krishna Reddy	1,861	1.68%	New
NOTA	None of the above	848	0.77%	New
JD(S)	Kalegowda	817	0.74%	▼4.59
Margin of victory		2,887	2.61%	▼2.82
Turnout		111,584	54.92%	▼1.01
Total valid votes		110,736		
Registered electors		203,184		▲18.87
INC gain from BJP		Swing	▲29.78	

=== Assembly election 2013 ===
2013 Karnataka Legislative Assembly election: Jayanagar
Party	Candidate	Votes	%	±%
BJP	B. N. Vijaya Kumar	43,990	19.40%	▼29.03
INC	M. C. Venugopal	31,678	13.97%	▼9.11
JD(S)	K. S. Sameeulla	12,097	5.33%	▼6.39
LSP	Rohith Patel	2,182	0.96%	New
KJP	Ravikumar. V	1,457	0.64%	New
Margin of victory		12,312	5.43%	▼19.92
Turnout		95,595	55.93%	▲8.82
Total valid votes		226,749		
Registered electors		170,932		▼9.67
BJP hold		Swing	▼29.03	

=== Assembly election 2008 ===
2008 Karnataka Legislative Assembly election: Jayanagar
Party	Candidate	Votes	%	±%
BJP	B. N. Vijaya Kumar	43,164	48.43%	▲11.61
INC	M. Suresh	20,570	23.08%	▼15.64
Independent	K. S. Sameeulla	11,882	13.33%	New
JD(S)	Narayan Raju. K	10,444	11.72%	▼11.25
BSP	Dr. K. Venkatesh	788	0.88%	New
Independent	B. G. Arun Kumar	535	0.60%	New
Margin of victory		22,594	25.35%	▲23.45
Turnout		89,147	47.11%	▼3.06
Total valid votes		89,123		
Registered electors		189,232		▼32.13
BJP gain from INC		Swing	▲9.71	

=== Assembly election 2004 ===
2004 Karnataka Legislative Assembly election: Jayanagar
Party	Candidate	Votes	%	±%
INC	Ramalinga Reddy	54,078	38.72%	▼9.66
BJP	Vijayakumar. V. N	51,428	36.82%	▼1.59
JD(S)	Jameer Ahmed Khan	32,086	22.97%	▲20.16
Kannada Nadu Party	Manjunath. S	918	0.66%	New
Margin of victory		2,650	1.90%	▼8.07
Turnout		139,890	50.17%	▼5.59
Total valid votes		139,670		
Registered electors		278,823		▲11.26
INC hold		Swing	▼9.66	

=== Assembly election 1999 ===
1999 Karnataka Legislative Assembly election: Jayanagar
Party	Candidate	Votes	%	±%
INC	Ramalinga Reddy	67,604	48.38%	▲11.00
BJP	B. N. Vijaya Kumar	53,673	38.41%	▲3.25
Independent	D. Chandrappa	13,473	9.64%	New
JD(S)	Shahtaj Khanan	3,929	2.81%	New
Independent	Naseer Pasha	1,048	0.75%	New
Margin of victory		13,931	9.97%	▲7.76
Turnout		139,729	55.76%	▲0.16
Total valid votes		139,727		
Rejected ballots		2	0.00%	▼1.42
Registered electors		250,609		▲18.79
INC hold		Swing	▲11.00	

=== Assembly election 1994 ===
1994 Karnataka Legislative Assembly election: Jayanagar
Party	Candidate	Votes	%	±%
INC	Ramalinga Reddy	43,215	37.38%	▼11.18
BJP	K. N. Subba Reddy	40,656	35.16%	▲23.32
JD	M. Chandra Sekhar	21,234	18.37%	▼8.14
INC	Abdul Kareem Sab	5,167	4.47%	New
JP	P. Chandra Shekar	1,597	1.38%	New
BSP	Mohammed Nazeer Ahmed	1,434	1.24%	▼0.70
Margin of victory		2,559	2.21%	▼19.84
Turnout		117,291	55.60%	▲18.93
Total valid votes		115,622		
Rejected ballots		1,669	1.42%	▲0.07
Registered electors		210,966		▼2.05
INC hold		Swing	▼11.18	

=== Assembly election 1989 ===
1989 Karnataka Legislative Assembly election: Jayanagar
Party	Candidate	Votes	%	±%
INC	Ramalinga Reddy	37,836	48.56%	▲10.50
JD	M. Chandrasekhar	20,655	26.51%	New
BJP	K. V. Srinivasa Bhat	9,228	11.84%	▲5.41
JP	K. L. Gangadhara Gowda	3,510	4.50%	New
AIML	Mohtashan Khalil	2,632	3.38%	New
BSP	T. Upendra	1,513	1.94%	New
Independent	P. K. Basha	601	0.77%	New
Margin of victory		17,181	22.05%	▲6.05
Turnout		78,992	36.67%	▼16.30
Total valid votes		77,924		
Rejected ballots		1,068	1.35%	▲0.35
Registered electors		215,384		▲44.03
INC gain from JP		Swing	▼5.50	

=== Assembly election 1985 ===
1985 Karnataka Legislative Assembly election: Jayanagar
Party	Candidate	Votes	%	±%
JP	M. Chandrasekhar	42,391	54.06%	▲0.10
INC	Ramalinga Reddy	29,842	38.06%	▲10.31
BJP	M. Gopalakrishna Adiga	5,043	6.43%	▼9.61
LKD	Safeerulla Khan	960	1.22%	New
Margin of victory		12,549	16.00%	▼10.21
Turnout		79,209	52.97%	▼2.27
Total valid votes		78,413		
Rejected ballots		796	1.00%	▼1.28
Registered electors		149,537		▲15.58
JP hold		Swing	▲0.10	

=== Assembly election 1983 ===
1983 Karnataka Legislative Assembly election: Jayanagar
Party	Candidate	Votes	%	±%
JP	M. Chandrasekhar	37,687	53.96%	▼2.63
INC	Mallur Ananda Rao	19,381	27.75%	▲25.85
BJP	K. A. Seshagiri Rao	11,205	16.04%	New
Margin of victory		18,306	26.21%	▼1.54
Turnout		71,467	55.24%	▼7.17
Total valid votes		69,841		
Rejected ballots		1,626	2.28%	▲0.23
Registered electors		129,383		▲27.12
JP hold		Swing	▼2.63	

=== Assembly election 1978 ===
1978 Karnataka Legislative Assembly election: Jayanagar
Party	Candidate	Votes	%	±%
JP	M. Chandrasekhar	35,209	56.59%	New
INC(I)	Sathyanarayana. M. G	17,941	28.84%	New
Independent	Govindaswamy. M. T	3,700	5.95%	New
Independent	Jayaraj. M. P	1,471	2.36%	New
INC	Gundu Rao. M. C	1,184	1.90%	New
Independent	Athik Ahmed. H. R	622	1.00%	New
Independent	Bakthatchala	605	0.97%	New
Independent	Shivaiah. K	381	0.61%	New
Margin of victory		17,268	27.75%	
Turnout		63,523	62.41%	
Total valid votes		62,218		
Rejected ballots		1,305	2.05%	
Registered electors		101,779		
JP win (new seat)				

== See also ==
- Bangalore Urban district
- List of constituencies of Karnataka Legislative Assembly
