= Sowmya Reddy =

Indian politician

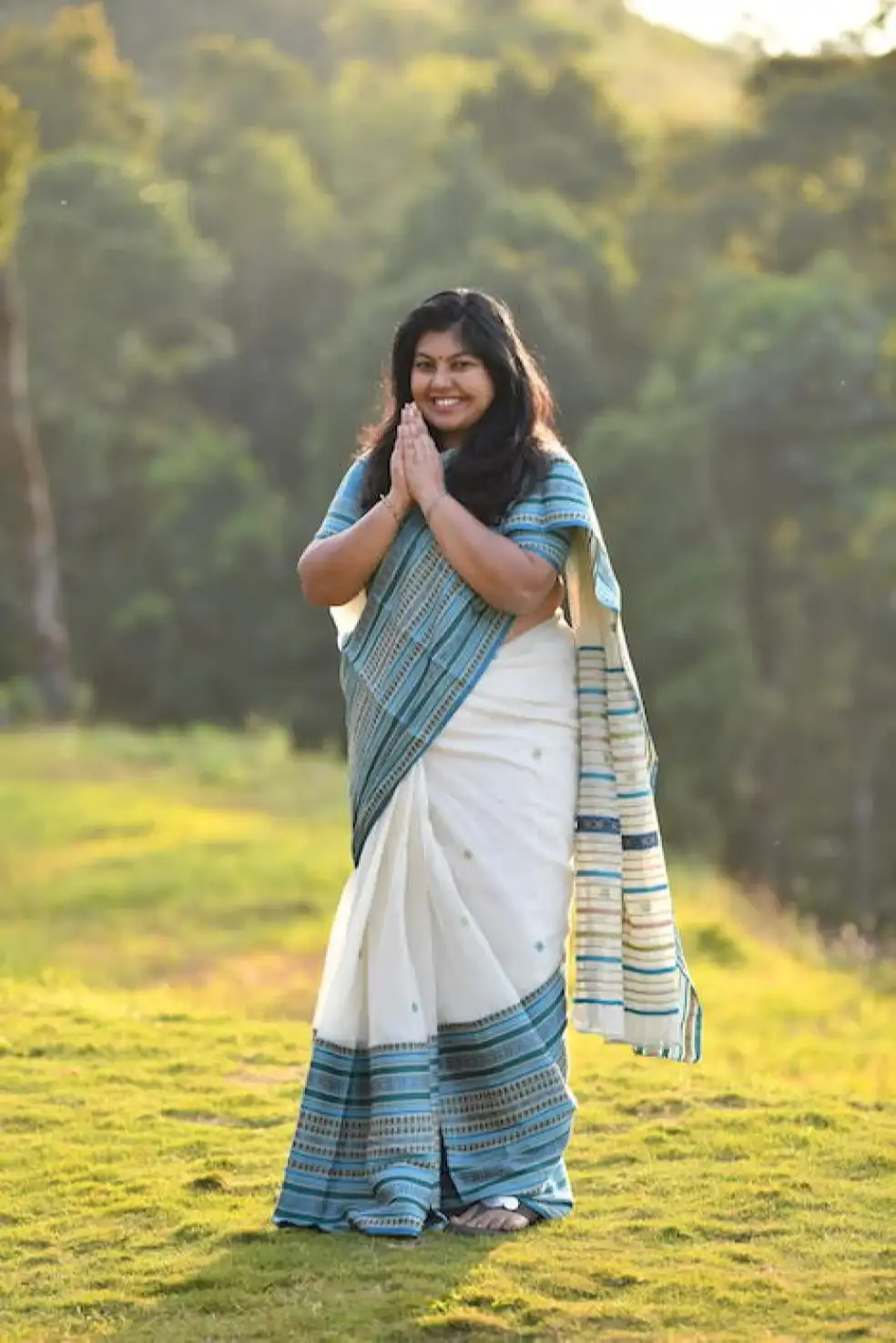

Member of the Karnataka Legislative Assembly
- In office June 2018 – 13 May 2023
- Preceded by: B. N. Vijaya Kumar
- Succeeded by: C. K. Ramamurthy
- Constituency: Jayanagar

Personal details
- Born: 18 March 1983 (age 43) Bengaluru, Karnataka, India
- Party: Indian National Congress
- Parent: Ramalinga Reddy (father)

Sowmya Reddy is an Indian politician from the Indian National Congress (INC) party. She is the current General Secretary of All India Mahila Congress (AIMC) and Karnataka Pradesh Congress Committee (KPCC).

She was elected as a member of the Legislative Assembly of Karnataka from Jayanagar in 2018. Sowmya Reddy is the daughter of Karnataka Muzrai and Transport Minister, Ramalinga Reddy.

She is an environmentalist, who has campaigned against the use of plastic as well as promoted the planting of trees to increase greenery in Bengaluru.

During the COVID-19 pandemic, she conducted numerous campaigns for providing cooked meals and dry rations to the people in her constituency.

Sowmya Reddy lost the state assembly election which was held in May 2023 in Karnataka by merely 16 votes which the Congress Party claims was manipulated by the election officials by considering the postal ballots which were initially rejected and have now challenged the result in court. The party alleged the misuse of government machinery to favour BJP candidate C K Ramamurthy.

Sowmya Reddy is an alumna of the New York Institute of Technology and the B.PAC Civic Leadership Incubator Program (B.CLIP).
