= Lagumenahalli, Bengaluru East =

- Village
- Location in Karnataka, India Lagumenahalli, Bengaluru East (India)
- Coordinates: 13.0766622°N 77.7373097°E
- Country: India
- State: Karnataka
- District: Bangalore
- Talukas: Bangalore East

Population (2011)
  - Total: 306

Languages
  - Official: Kannada
- Time zone: UTC+5:30 (IST)
- PIN: 561203
- Telephone code: 080
- Vehicle registration: KA 53
- Lok Sabha constituency: Bangalore Central (Lok Sabha constituency)
- Legislative Assembly: Mahadevapura Assembly constituency

Lagumenahalli is a village in the southern Indian state of Karnataka. It is located in the Bangalore East (Taluk) taluka of the Bangalore Urban district. The village lies approximately 12 km from Krishnarajapuram and about 13 km from Hoskote. According to 2009 data, Mandur, Bengaluru East serves as the gram panchayat for Lagumenahalli.

== Demographics ==
Based on data from the 2011 census of India, Lagumenahalli has the village code 613096 and covers an area of 32.37 hectares. The village has a population of 306 residents, comprising 163 males and 143 females. Its overall literacy rate is 54.58%, with literacy rates of 62.58% for males and 45.45% for females. The settlement comprises approximately 63 houses, and its postal code is 561203.

== Facilities ==
Lagumenahalli has below basic types of facilities.

- KMF (Karnataka Milk Federation) Dairy
- Lagumenahalli Lake

== Places of Worship ==
- Hanuman Temple
- Sri Muneshwara Temple
- Laxmi Narshimha Temple

== See also ==
- Hancharahalli
- Nimbekaipura
- Huskur
- Bommenahalli
- Raghuvanahalli
- Jyothipura
