= Kattugollahalli =

- Village
- Location in Karnataka, India Kattugollahalli (India)
- Coordinates: 13.10048°N 77.723935°E
- Country: India
- State: Karnataka
- District: Bangalore
- Talukas: Bangalore East

Population (2011)
  - Total: 966

Languages
  - Official: Kannada
- Time zone: UTC+5:30 (IST)
- PIN: 560049
- Telephone code: 080
- Vehicle registration: KA 53
- Lok Sabha constituency: Bangalore Central (Lok Sabha constituency)
- Legislative Assembly: Mahadevapura Assembly constituency

Kattugollahalli is a village in the southern state of Karnataka, India. Kattugollahalli village is located in Bangalore East taluka of Bangalore Urban district in Karnataka, India. It is situated 15 km away from Krishnarajapuram and around 18 km from Hoskote. As per 2009 stats, Mandur is the gram panchayat of Kattugollahalli village.

== Demographics ==
According to 2011 census of India information the location code or village code of Kattugollahalli village is 613087. The total geographical area of the village is 366.63 hectares. Kattugollahalli has a total population of 966 peoples, out of which male population is 455 while female population is 511. The literacy rate of kattugollahalli village is 58.07% out of which 64.40% males and 52.45% females are literate. There are about 214 houses in kattugollahalli village. Pincode of Kattugollahalli village locality is 562129.

== Facilities ==
Kattugollahalli has below basic types of facilities.

- Govt Lower Primary School Kattugollahalli – The school is owned by the Government of Karnataka.
- Ksheera Bhavana- KMF (Karnataka Milk Federation) Dairy
- Clean Drinking water unit
- Nyaya Bele Angadi, KMF dairy building

== Places of Worship ==
- Patalmma Temple
- Sri Anjaneya Temple

== See also ==
- Hancharahalli
- Huskur
- Bommenahalli
- Raghuvanahalli
- Jyothipura
