= Thirumenahalli, Bengaluru East =

- Village
- Location in Karnataka, India Thirumenahalli, Bengaluru East (India)
- Coordinates: 13.0625356°N 77.7414052°E
- Country: India
- State: Karnataka
- District: Bangalore
- Talukas: Bangalore East

Population (2011)
  - Total: 555

Languages
  - Official: Kannada
- Time zone: UTC+5:30 (IST)
- PIN: 562129
- Telephone code: 080
- Vehicle registration: KA 53
- Lok Sabha constituency: Bangalore Central (Lok Sabha constituency)
- Legislative Assembly: Mahadevapura Assembly constituency

Thirumenahalli is a village in the southern state of Karnataka, India. Thirumenahalli village is located in Bangalore East taluka of Bangalore Urban district in Karnataka, India. It is situated 15 km away from Krishnarajapuram and around 17 km from Hoskote. As per 2009 stats, Mandur is the gram panchayat of Thirumenahalli village.

== Demographics ==
According to 2011 census of India information the location code or village code of Thirumenahalli village is 613090. The total geographical area of the village is 135.38 hectares. Thirumenahalli has a total population of 555 peoples, out of which male population is 274 while female population is 281. The literacy rate of thirumenahalli village is 70.27% out of which 79.56% males and 61.21% females are literate. There are about 112 houses in thirumenahalli village. Pincode of Thirumenahalli village locality is 562129.

== Facilities ==
Thirumenahalli has below basic types of facilities.

- KMF (Karnataka Milk Federation) Dairy
- Thirumenahalli Bus Stop

== Places of Worship ==
- Yellamma Devi temple
- Gopal swamy temple

== See also ==
- Nimbekaipura
- Lagumenahalli
- Bendiganahalli
- Raghuvanahalli
