= Jyothipura, Bengaluru East =

- Village
- Location in Karnataka, India Jyothipura, Bengaluru East (India)
- Coordinates: 13.1020974°N 77.7481091°E
- Country: India
- State: Karnataka
- District: Bangalore
- Talukas: Bangalore East

Population (2011)
  - Total: 1,227

Languages
  - Official: Kannada
- Time zone: UTC+5:30 (IST)
- PIN: 562129
- Telephone code: 080
- Vehicle registration: KA 53
- Lok Sabha constituency: Bangalore Central (Lok Sabha constituency)
- Legislative Assembly: Mahadevapura Assembly constituency

Jyothipura also spelt as Jothipura is a village in the southern state of Karnataka, India. Jyothipura village is located in Bangalore East taluka of Bangalore Urban district in Karnataka, India. It is situated 13 km away from Krishnarajapuram and around 16 km from Hoskote. As per 2009 stats, Mandur is the gram panchayat of Jyothipura village.

== Demographics ==
According to 2011 census of India information the location code or village code of Jyothipura village is 613089. The total geographical area of the village is 503.47 hectares. Jyothipura has a total population of 1,227 peoples, out of which male population is 639 while female population is 588. The literacy rate of Jyothipura village is 71.48% out of which 79.19% males and 63.10% females are literate. There are about 262 houses in Jyothipura village. Pincode of Jyothipura village locality is 562129.

== Facilities ==
Jyothipura has below basic types of facilities.

- Govt Higher Primary School Jyothipura – The school is owned by the Government of Karnataka.
- Govt. High School- The school is owned by the Government of Karnataka
- Anganawadi Kendra
- Ksheera Bhavana- KMF (Karnataka Milk Federation) Dairy
- Clean Drinking water unit
- Commercial Complex building - Government of Karnataka
- Budigere Road- Alternative route for Kempegowda International Airport.
- Jyothipura Lake

== Places of Worship ==
- Sri Shanimahathma Temple
- Sri Huskuramma Devi temple
- Sri venugopalaswamy temple
- El Shaddai Prayer Hall

== See also ==
- Hancharahalli
- Kattugollahalli
- Huskur
- Bommenahalli
- Raghuvanahalli
- Kodigehalli
