= Mandur, Bengaluru East =

- village
- Location in Karnataka, India Mandur, Bengaluru East (India)
- Coordinates: 13.0816832°N 77.732284°E
- Country: India
- State: Karnataka
- District: Bangalore
- Talukas: Bangalore East

Population (2011)
  - Total: 2,295

Languages
  - Official: Kannada
- Time zone: UTC+5:30 (IST)
- PIN: 562129
- Telephone code: 080
- Vehicle registration: KA 53
- Lok Sabha constituency: Bangalore Central (Lok Sabha constituency)
- Legislative Assembly: Mahadevapura Assembly constituency

Mandur is a village in the southern state of Karnataka, India. Mandur village is located in Bangalore East taluka of Bangalore Urban district in Karnataka, India. It is situated 11 km away from Krishnarajapuram and around 13 km from Hoskote. As per 2009 stats, Mandur village is also a gram panchayat.

== Demographics ==
According to 2011 census of India information the location code or village code of Mandur village is 613094. The total geographical area of the village is 527.07 hectares. Mandur has a total population of 2,295 people, out of which male population is 1,170 while female population is 1,125. The literacy rate of mandur village is 72.03% out of which 77.69% males and 66.13% females are literate. There are about 533 houses in mandur village. Pincode of Mandur village locality is 562129.

== Gram Panchayat ==
As per 2009 stats, Mandur village is also a gram panchayat.
Below are the Villages in Manduru Gram Panchayat:

1. Bendiganahalli
2. Bommenahalli
3. Hancharahalli
4. Huskur
5. Jyothipura
6. Kattugollahalli
7. Kodigehalli
8. Lagumenahalli
9. Nimbekaipura
10. Raghuvanahalli
11. Thirumenahalli
12. Shringaripura
13. Vanajanahalli
14. Mandur

== Facilities ==
Mandur has below basic types of facilities.

- Mandur Gram Panchayat Office
- Digital Library, Mandur Gram Panchayat
- Commercial Complex, Mandur Gram Panchayat
- Primary Health Center
- Animal Hospital
- Krishi Bhavana- Agriculture center, Bangalore East
- Anganwadi Kendra
- Govt Higher Primary School, Mandur – The school is owned by the government of Karnataka.
- KMF (Karnataka Milk Federation) Dairy
- Hosabelaku Home For The Aged
- KPTCL Mandur
- BMTC Depot
- Dr. B R Ambedkar Bhavana
- Budigere Road- Alternative route for Kempegowda International Airport.
- Public Toilet
- Someswara temple Pond, Mandur
- Mandur - Jyothipura Reserved Forest

== Places of Worship ==
- Sri Someshwara Temple
- Sri Abhaya Anjaneya swamy Temple
- Lagumamma Devi Temple
- Sri Durgadevi Temple
- Sri Radha Krishna Temple
- Ambhabhavani Temple
- Om Shakthi Temple
- BMTC Depot 47 - Mandur

== Garbage Dump Yard ==
During 2008, Bruhat Bengaluru Mahanagara Palike (BBMP) started dumping garbage in outskirts area of Mandur village, This landfill site spread over 135 acres in Mandur village. In the year 2014, After the protest by the villagers and environmentalists, dumping was stopped on 1 December 2014. Overall, the dump site was active nearly for 6 years, which led to over 20 lakh tonnes of legacy waste. In order to clear the waste, Currently biomining of legacy waste is in progress.

== See also ==
- Budigere
- Konadasapura
