= Konadasapura =

- village
- Location in Karnataka, India Konadasapura (India)
- Coordinates: 13.0442433°N 77.7433411°E
- Country: India
- State: Karnataka
- District: Bangalore
- Talukas: Bangalore East

Population (2011)
  - Total: 4,170

Languages
  - Official: Kannada
- Time zone: UTC+5:30 (IST)
- PIN: 560049
- Telephone code: 080
- Vehicle registration: KA 53
- Lok Sabha constituency: Bangalore Central (Lok Sabha constituency)
- Legislative Assembly: Mahadevapura Assembly constituency

Konadasapura is a village in the southern state of Karnataka, India. Konadasapura village is located in Bangalore East taluka of Bangalore Urban district in Karnataka, India. It is situated 7 km away from Krishnarajapuram and around 7 km from Hoskote. As per 2009 stats, Doddabanahalli is the gram panchayat of Konadasapura village. Junction point Budigere Cross is located in this village.

== Budigere Cross ==
Budigere Cross is a famous junction place which is located in Konadasapura village, is a junction of four important roads. Budigere is located 11 km away from Budigere Cross, Passengers have to take diversion at this junction in Konadasapura to reach Budigere town, Hence popularly it has been called by the name Budigere Cross.

- East - West, Connects Bengaluru - Tirupati via Old Madras Road. KR Puram and Hoskote are connected by this road.
- South - North, Connects White field - Budigere, Alternative route for Kempegowda International Airport.

== Demographics ==
According to 2011 census of India information the location code or village code of Konadasapura village is 613108. The total geographical area of the village is 134.46 hectares. Konadasapura has a total population of 4170 people, out of which male population is 2313 while female population is 1857. The literacy rate of Konadasapura village is 81.58% out of which 86.35% of males and 75.57% of females are literate. There are about 1074 houses in Konadasapura village. Pincode of Konadasapura village locality is 560049.

== Facilities ==
Konadasapura has below basic types of facilities.

- Government Lower Primary School, Konadasapura – The school is owned by the government of Karnataka, located in Konadasapura itself.
- Anganwadi Kendra
- Konadasapura Lake
- KMF (Karnataka Milk Federation) Dairy
- National Highway-75 – Old Madras Road- Connects Bengaluru and Tirupati
- Whitefield- Hoskote Road
- Budigere Cross junction- Alternative route for Kempegowda International Airport.

== Places of Worship ==
- Konadasapura Kere Temple
- Sree Sani Mahatma Temple
- Sri Lakshmi Venkateshwara Swamy Temple
- Nimra Masjid Konadasapura

== See also ==
- Budigere
- Bommenahalli
- Huskur
- Thirumenahalli
