= Kodigehalli, Bengaluru East =

- Village
- Location in Karnataka, India Kodigehalli, Bengaluru East (India)
- Coordinates: 13.0883054°N 77.7360352°E
- Country: India
- State: Karnataka
- District: Bangalore
- Talukas: Bangalore East

Population (2011)
  - Total: 152

Languages
  - Official: Kannada
- Time zone: UTC+5:30 (IST)
- PIN: 562129
- Telephone code: 080
- Vehicle registration: KA 53
- Lok Sabha constituency: Bangalore Central (Lok Sabha constituency)
- Legislative Assembly: Mahadevapura Assembly constituency

Kodigehalli is a village in the southern state of Karnataka, India. It is located in the Bangalore East taluka of the Bangalore Urban district, approximately 12 km from Krishnarajapuram and about 14 km from Hoskote. According to 2009 statistics, the village is administered by the gram panchayat of Mandur.

== Demographics ==
Based on data from the 2011 census of India, Kodigehalli (village code 613093) covers an area of 105.45 hectares. The village has a population of 152 residents, comprising 71 males and 81 females. Its overall literacy rate is 44.08%, with male literacy at 39.44% and female literacy at 48.15%. The village comprises approximately 38 houses, and its postal code is 562129.

== Facilities ==
Kodigehalli has below basic types of facilities.

- Samudhaya Bhavana

== Places of Worship ==
- Bhasaveshwara Swamy Temple

== See also ==
- Hancharahalli
- Kattugollahalli
- Huskur
- Thirumenahalli
- Raghuvanahalli
