= Bendiganahalli, Bengaluru East =

- Village
- Location in Karnataka, India Bendiganahalli, Bengaluru East (India)
- Coordinates: 13.0708304°N 77.7445201°E
- Country: India
- State: Karnataka
- District: Bangalore
- Talukas: Bangalore East

Population (2011)
  - Total: 240

Languages
  - Official: Kannada
- Time zone: UTC+5:30 (IST)
- PIN: 562129
- Telephone code: 080
- Vehicle registration: KA 53
- Lok Sabha constituency: Bangalore Central (Lok Sabha constituency)
- Legislative Assembly: Mahadevapura Assembly constituency

Bendiganahalli is a village in the southern state of Karnataka, India. Bendiganahalli village is located in Bangalore East taluka of Bangalore Urban district in Karnataka, India. It is situated 11 km away from Krishnarajapuram and around 11 km from Hoskote. As per 2009 stats, Mandur is the gram panchayat of Bendiganahalli village.

== Demographics ==
According to 2011 census of India information the location code or village code of Bendiganahalli village is 613095. The total geographical area of the village is 80.89 hectares. Bendiganahalli has a total population of 240 people, out of which male population is 132 while female population is 108. The literacy rate of Bendiganahalli village is 62.50 % out of which 68.94 % of males and 54.63 % of females are literate. There are about 350 houses in Bendiganahalli village. Pincode of Bendiganahalli village locality is 562129.

== Facilities ==
Bendiganahalli has below basic types of facilities.

- Govt Lower Primary School, Bendiganahalliu – The school is owned by the Government of Karnataka.

== Places of Worship ==
- Shri Abhaya Anjaneya Swamy Temple
- Basavanna temple

== See also ==
- Hancharahalli
- Lagumenahalli
- Bommenahalli
- Raghuvanahalli
