= Hancharahalli =

- Village
- Location in Karnataka, India Hancharahalli (India)
- Coordinates: 13.0969385°N 77.7312977°E
- Country: India
- State: Karnataka
- District: Bangalore
- Talukas: Bangalore East

Population (2011)
  - Total: 1,200

Languages
  - Official: Kannada
- Time zone: UTC+5:30 (IST)
- PIN: 562129
- Telephone code: 080
- Vehicle registration: KA 53
- Lok Sabha constituency: Bangalore Central (Lok Sabha constituency)
- Legislative Assembly: Mahadevapura Assembly constituency

Hancharahalli is a village in the southern state of Karnataka, India. Hancharahalli village is located in Bangalore East taluka of Bangalore Urban district in Karnataka, India. It is situated 14 km away from Krishnarajapuram and around 15 km from Hoskote. As per 2009 stats, Mandur is the gram panchayat of Hancharahalli village.

== Demographics ==
According to 2011 census of India information the location code or village code of Hancharahalli village is 613091. The total geographical area of the village is 215.44 hectares. Hancharahalli has a total population of 1,200 people, out of which male population is 618 while female population is 582. The literacy rate of Hancharahalli village is 70.08% out of which 76.38% males and 63.40% females are literate. There are about 257 houses in Hancharahalli village. Pincode of Hancharahalli village locality is 562129.

== Facilities ==
Hancharahalli has below basic types of facilities.

- Govt Higher Primary School
- KMF (Karnataka Milk Federation) Dairy
- Anganawadi Kendra

== Places of Worship ==
- Chowdeshwari Temple
- Venugopal Swamy Temple
- Shree Bhadrakaali Amma Devasthana
- Gangama devi temple
- Hancharahalli Gangamma Temple
- Anjaneya Swamy Temple
- Sri Subramanya Swamy Ashwat Katte
- Sri Patalamma Temple
- Eastern Gate Church

== See also ==
- Kodigehalli
- Huskur
- Bommenahalli
- Raghuvanahalli
