= Nimbekaipura =

- Village
- Location in Karnataka, India Nimbekaipura (India)
- Coordinates: 13.0562815°N 77.7553715°E
- Country: India
- State: Karnataka
- District: Bangalore
- Talukas: Bangalore East

Population (2011)
  - Total: 898

Languages
  - Official: Kannada
- Time zone: UTC+5:30 (IST)
- PIN: 560049
- Telephone code: 080
- Vehicle registration: KA 53
- Lok Sabha constituency: Bangalore Central (Lok Sabha constituency)
- Legislative Assembly: Mahadevapura Assembly constituency

Nimbekaipura is a village in a southern state of Karnataka, India. Nimbekaipura village is located in Bangalore East taluka of Bangalore Urban district in Karnataka, India. It is situated 8 km away from Krishnarajapuram and around 5 km from Hoskote. As per 2009 stats, Mandur is the gram panchayat of Nimbekaipura village.

== Demographics ==
According to 2011 census of India information the location code or village code of Nimbekaipura village is 613099. The total geographical area of the village is 194.33 hectares. Nimbekaipura has a total population of 898 people, out of which male population is 479 while female population is 419. The literacy rate of Nimbekaipura village is 68.26% out of which 73.07% of males and 62.77% of females are literate. There are about 200 houses in Nimbekaipura village. Pincode of Nimbekaipura village locality is 560049.

== Facilities ==
Nimbekaipura has below types of facilities.

- Govt. Lower Primary School, NewBuilding, Nimbekaipura – The school is owned by the government of Karnataka, located in Nimbekaipura itself.
- Balaharaka Football Club (BFC Turf Arena), Sports School
- Nimbekaipura Lake
- Overhead tank

== Temples ==
- Basavesvara temple

== See also ==
- Budigere
- Konadasapura
- Huskur
- Bommenahalli
- Jyothipura
