= Ajjagondahalli =

- village
- Ajjagondahalli is in Bengaluru North district
- Country: India
- State: Karnataka
- District: Bengaluru North
- Talukas: Hosakote

Government
  - Body: Village Panchayat

Languages
  - Official: Kannada
- Time zone: UTC+5:30 (IST)
- Nearest city: Bengaluru
- Civic agency: Village Panchayat

Ajjagondahalli is a village in the southern state of Karnataka, India. It is located in the Hosakote taluk of Bengaluru North district in Karnataka.
