= Bommenahalli, Bengaluru East =

- Village
- Location in Karnataka, India Bommenahalli, Bengaluru East (India)
- Coordinates: 13.0746709°N 77.7293451°E
- Country: India
- State: Karnataka
- District: Bangalore
- Talukas: Bangalore East

Population (2011)
  - Total: 1,320

Languages
  - Official: Kannada
- Time zone: UTC+5:30 (IST)
- PIN: 560049
- Telephone code: 080
- Vehicle registration: KA 53
- Lok Sabha constituency: Bangalore Central (Lok Sabha constituency)
- Legislative Assembly: Mahadevapura Assembly constituency

Bommenahalli is a village in the southern state of Karnataka, India. Bommenahalli village is located in Bangalore East taluka of Bangalore Urban district in Karnataka, India. It is situated 10 km away from Krishnarajapuram and around 10 km from Hoskote. As per 2009 stats, Mandur is the gram panchayat of Bommenahalli village.

== Demographics ==
According to 2011 census of India information the location code or village code of Bommenahalli village is 613097. The total geographical area of the village is 311.25 hectares. Bommenahalli has a total population of 1,320 people, out of which male population is 658 while female population is 662. The literacy rate of Bommenahalli village is 64.32 % out of which 70.52% of males and 58.16 % of females are literate. There are about 289 houses in Bommenahalli village. Pincode of Bommenahalli village locality is 560049.

== Facilities ==
Bommenahalli has below basic types of facilities.

- Bangalore East Taluk Panchayat Office, Located at Bommenahalli Gate
- Government Higher Primary School, Bommenahalli – The school is owned by the government of Karnataka.
- Government Lower Primary School, Bommenahalli – The school is owned by the government of Karnataka.
- KMF (Karnataka Milk Federation) Dairy
- Anganawadi Kendra
- Budigere Road- Alternative route for Kempegowda International Airport.
- Bommenahalli Lake

== Places of Worship ==
- Om Shakti Temple
- Hanuman Temple
- Gajanana Temple
- Katte abaya Anjaneya swami temple
- Masjid E Abu Bakkar

== See also ==
- Budigere
- Huskur
- Nimbekaipura
- Bendiganahalli
