= Raghuvanahalli, Bengaluru East =

- Village
- Location in Karnataka, India Raghuvanahalli, Bengaluru East (India)
- Coordinates: 13.0887204°N 77.7434534°E
- Country: India
- State: Karnataka
- District: Bangalore
- Talukas: Bangalore East

Population (2011)
  - Total: 142

Languages
  - Official: Kannada
- Time zone: UTC+5:30 (IST)
- PIN: 562129
- Telephone code: 080
- Vehicle registration: KA 53
- Lok Sabha constituency: Bangalore Central (Lok Sabha constituency)
- Legislative Assembly: Mahadevapura Assembly constituency

Raghuvanahalli is a village in the southern state of Karnataka, India. It is located in the Bangalore East taluka of the Bangalore Urban district. The village is situated approximately 14 km from both Krishnarajapuram and Hoskote, and according to 2009 statistics, it is administered under the gram panchayat of Mandur.

== Demographics ==
Based on data from the 2011 census of India, Raghuvanahalli (location code 613092) covers an area of 112.95 hectares. The census recorded a population of 142 residents, comprising 73 males and 69 females. The overall literacy rate is 64.79%, with male literacy at 63.01% and female literacy at 66.67%. The village comprises approximately 29 houses, and its postal code is 562129.

== Facilities ==
Raghuvanahalli has below basic types of facilities.

- Stree Shakti Bhavana

== Places of Worship ==
- Shri Kashi Vishweshwara Temple
- Shiva Temple
- Sri Lakshmi Narasimha Temple
- Dattatreya temple

== See also ==
- Nimbekaipura
- Huskur
- Bommenahalli
- Jyothipura
- Kodigehalli
