= Jadigenahalli =

Village in Karnataka, India

- Village in Hosakote taluk
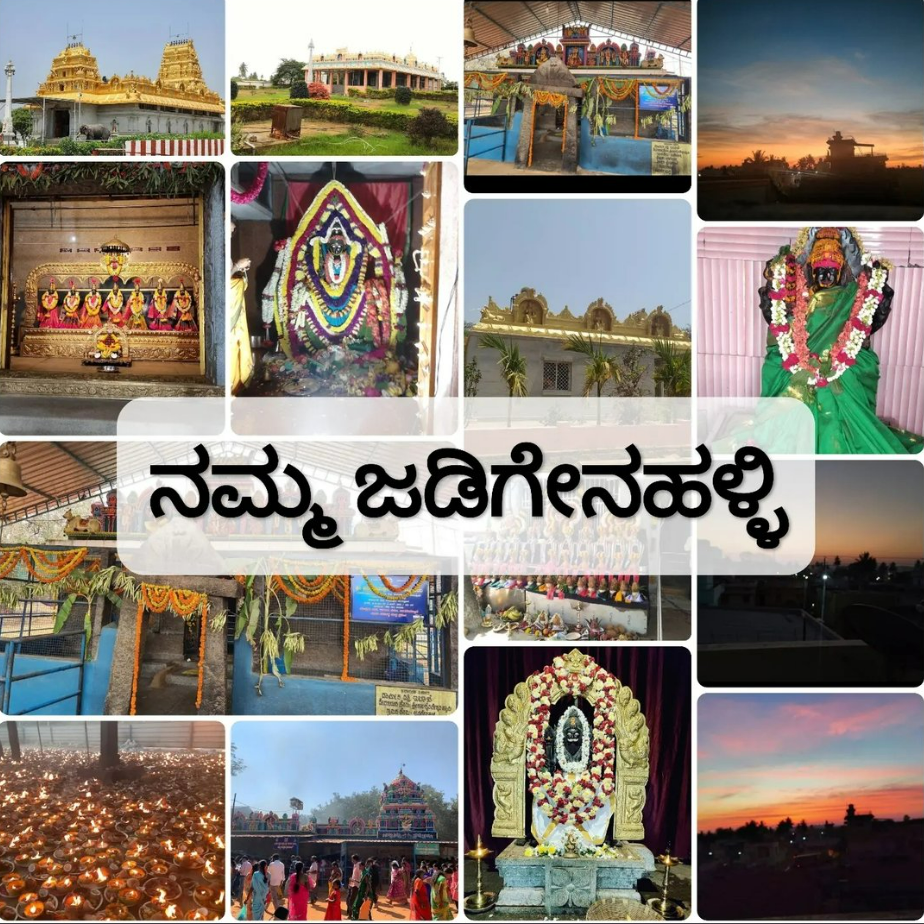
- Namma Jadigenahalli poster

- Location in Karnataka, India
- Coordinates: 13°03′08″N 77°51′09″E
- country: India
- State: Karnataka
- District: Bengaluru North
- Taluk: Hoskote
- Elevation: 920 m (3,020 ft)

Population (2011)
  - Total: 1,977

Languages
  - Official: Kannada
- Time zone: IST
  - Summer (DST): UTC+5:30
- PIN: 562114
- Area code: 91-80
- Vehicle registration: KA53
- Lok Sabha constituency: Chikkaballapura
- Vidhan Sabha constituency: Hoskote

Jadigenahalli is a village in the southern Indian state of Karnataka. It is situated in the Hoskote taluk of the Bengaluru North district, 7 kilometers from Hoskote and 30 kilometers from Bangalore. The village is also one of the hoblis of the taluk Hoskote. 69 villages come under Jadigenahalli hobli

Jadigenahalli is well-known for housing the Sri Kalabhairaveshwara temple.

== History ==
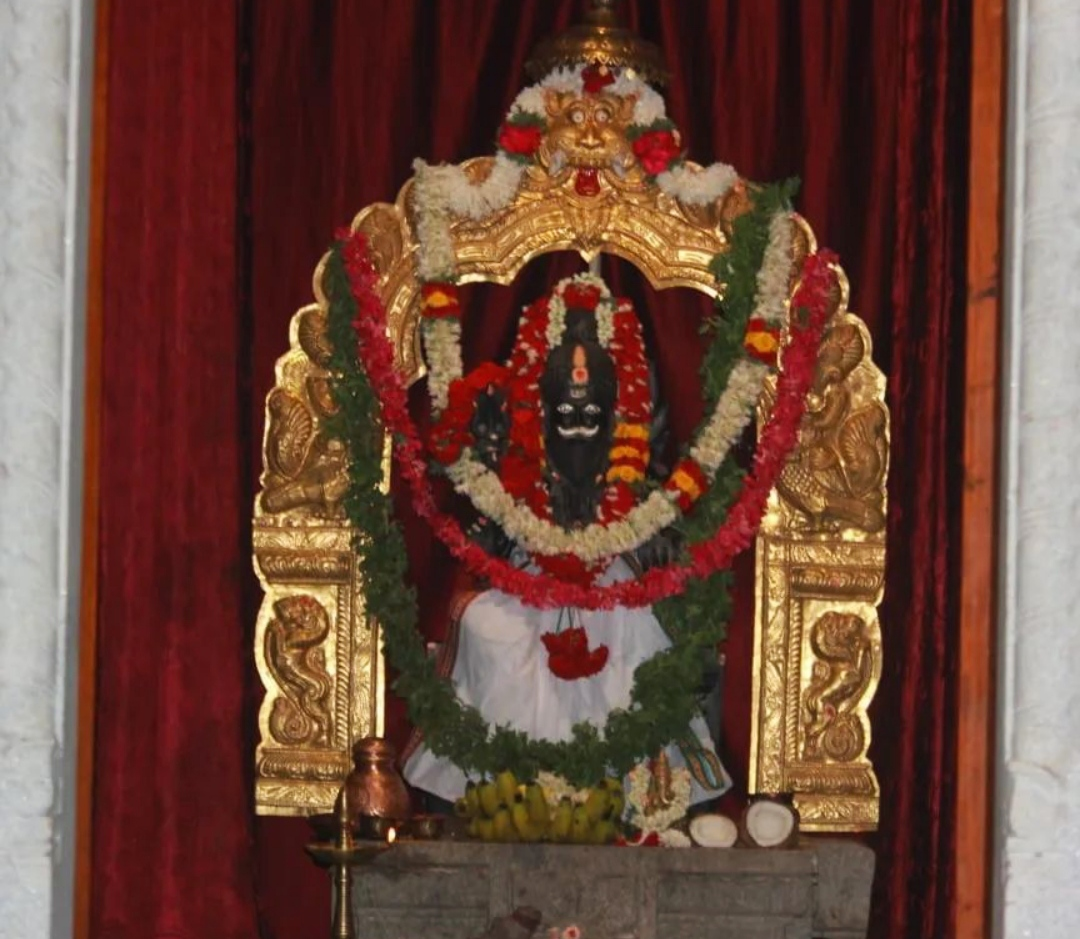
Jade Muneshwara

Jadigenahalli village is named after the holy lord Jade Muneshwara, and is located on Saptamatrika Hill.

== Demographics ==
As of 2011 India census, the village's overall geographic area is 419.15 hectares, as measured by the census. There were 1,977 residents; 1,010 were male and 967 were female. 71.88% of the people in Jadigenahalli were literate, including 79.41% of males and 64.01% of females. In the village, there were around 449 houses.

The official and most often spoken language in the community is Kannada. Several residents also speak Tamil.

== Culture ==
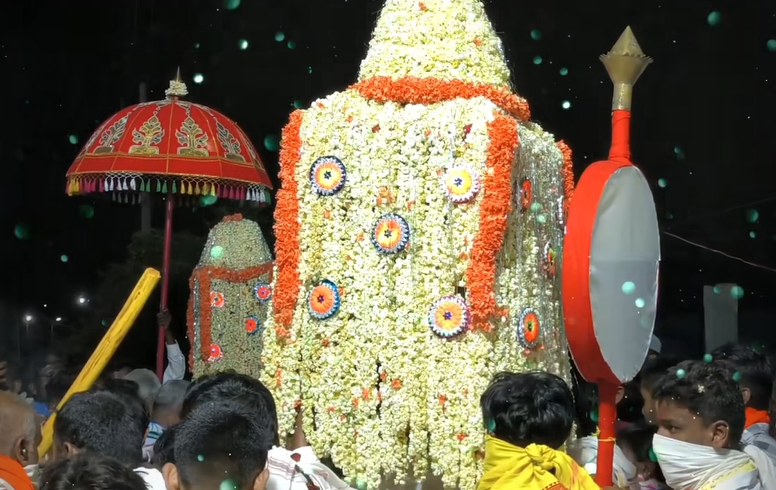
Jaatre 2023

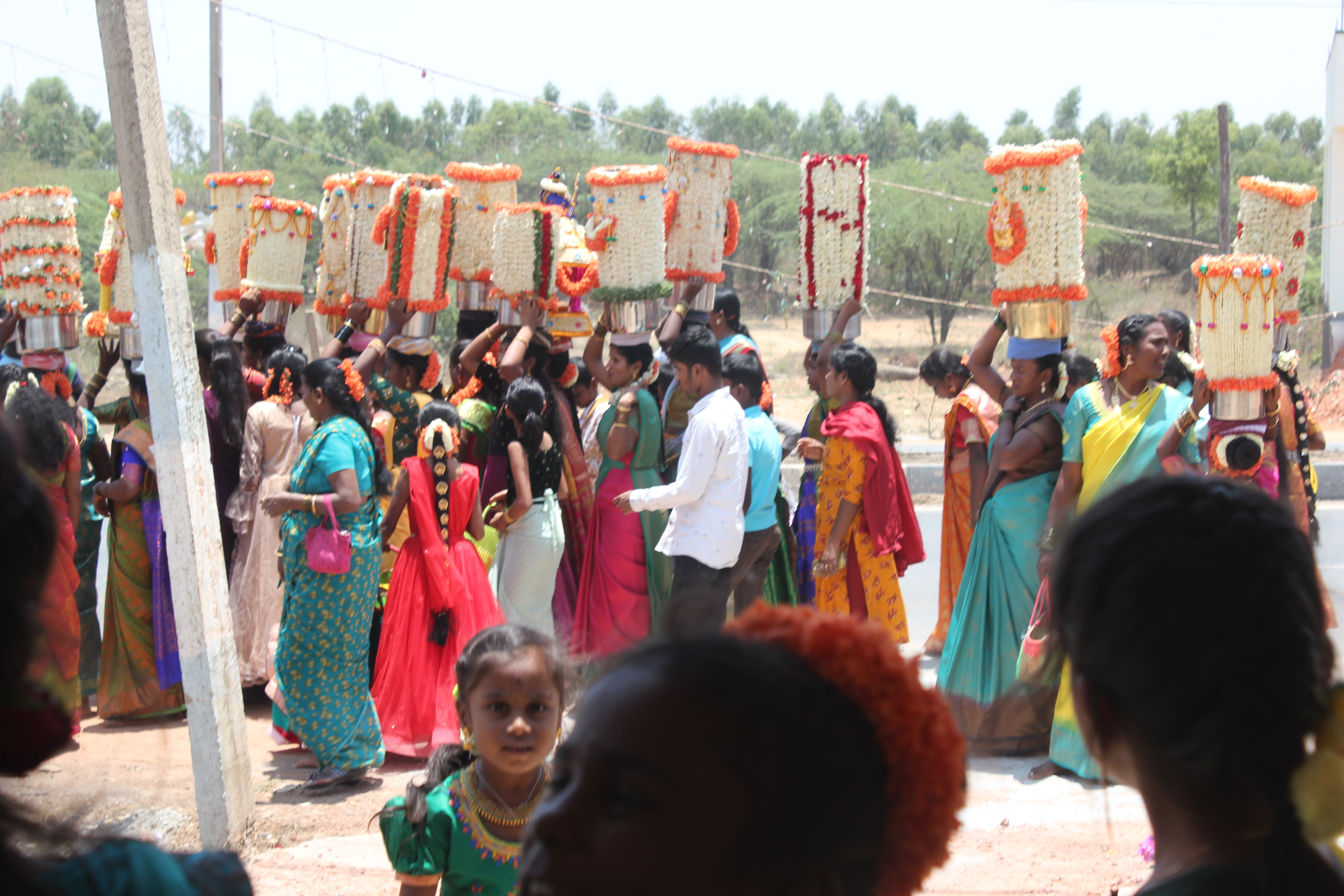
Deepotsava

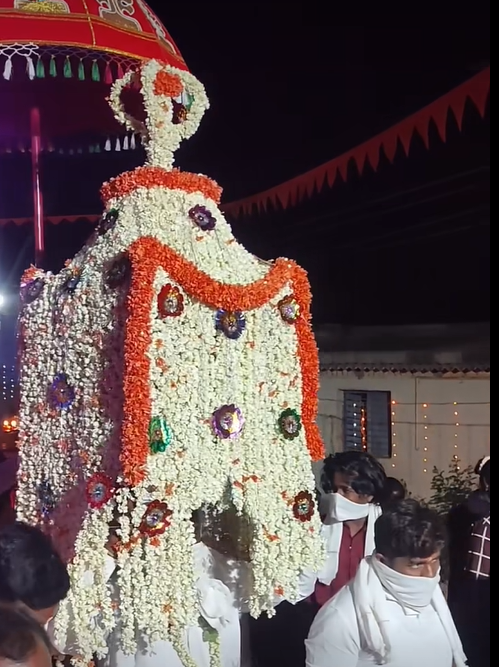
Jaatre

A quarterly fair honoring the deity Sri Karagaparameshwari is held in the village, typically in April or May once every nine or twelve years. The fair is said to have begun in 1950 as a result of plague and cholera that were prevalent in the villages at the time. The fair was inaugurated by walking around the village for nine days without shoes or vehicles. Accordingly, the fair that began on that day was held in this manner once every nine years and even today, people observe the same customs. When the last fair took place in April 2023, the villagers observed a rigorous fast during which they did not wear sandals for nine days in the sweltering sun. In addition, the villagers prohibited outsiders from visiting the village during the nine days of the fair.

Once in 9 or 12 years, abhisheka and flowers, specifically jasmine, are offered to the goddess Karagaparameshwari. Once Abhishekam and jasmine's decoration is done, a procession throughout Jadigenahalli and the goddess Karagaparameshwari reaches Kalabhairaveshwara temple. Poojas are performed to her in the temple after taking her back to the temple. This same process continues for one whole month, that is, from one new moon day to another new moon day. A total of 12 villages take part in this procession. On the last day, the villagers take her to the hill known as Saptamatrika Betta. Here Saptamatrika and Lord Jade Munshwara's temple is located. After witnessing the pooja on the hill, she finally returns to her temple, and the locals slaughter a large number of sheep in front of the temple.

The village also has an annual fair in April, often before Bengaluru Karaga, where locals offer decorated lamps (Deepotsava) to nine goddesses, beginning from Ugadi and terminating on Ramanavami.

There are numerous temples in the village. Sri Kalabhairava Temple, one of them, is the most well-known. Sapthamatha Temple, another well-known temple, is situated on a hilltop. Other temples in the village include the Karagaparameshwari temple, Sri Abhaya Anjenaya Swami Temple, Muneshwara Temple, Karibasaveshwara Temple, Yallamma Temple, Eshwara Temple, Om Shakti Temple, and Kadmalleshwara.

== Climate ==
Jadigenahalli is located at 13°03′N 77°51′E. It has an average elevation of 920 meters.

The village has a tropical climate. According to the Köppen-Geiger classification of climates, this is a tropical wet and dry climate or Aw. Here, the average temperature is 22.9 °C (73.3 °F). There is roughly 903 mm (35.6 inches) of precipitation annually. The summers here have a good deal of rainfall, while the winters have very little.

== Sri Kalabhairaveshwara Temple Jadigenahalli ==
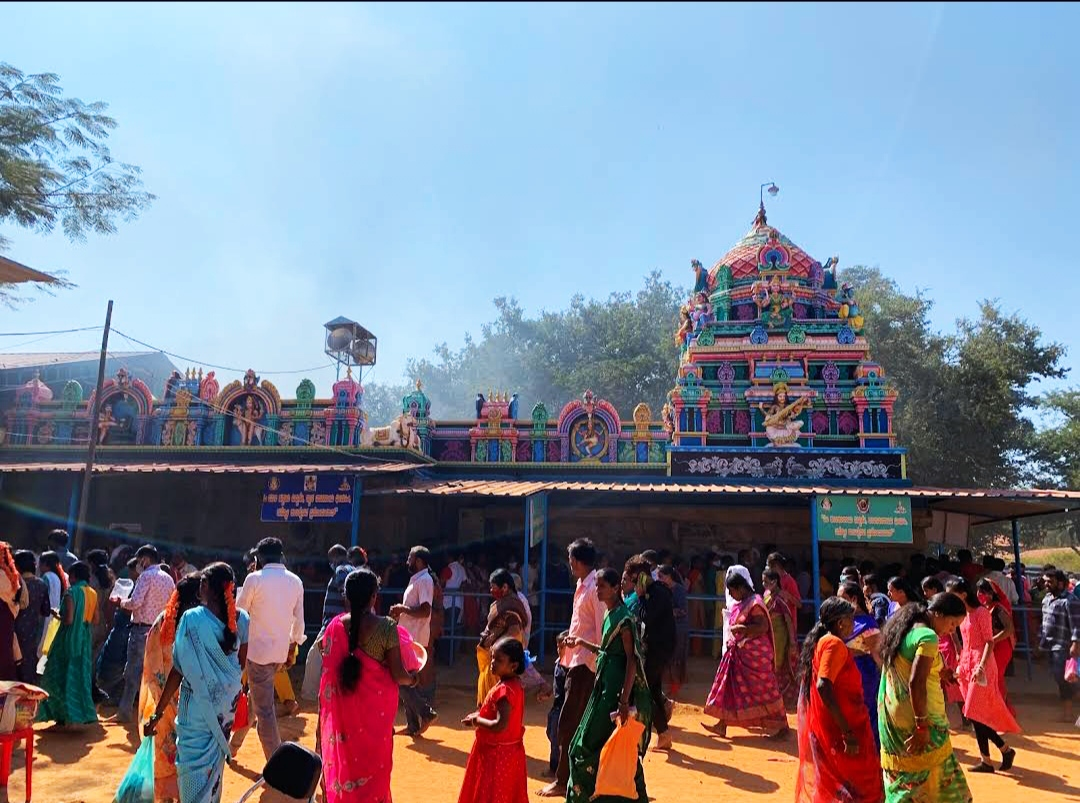
Kalabhaireshwara temple

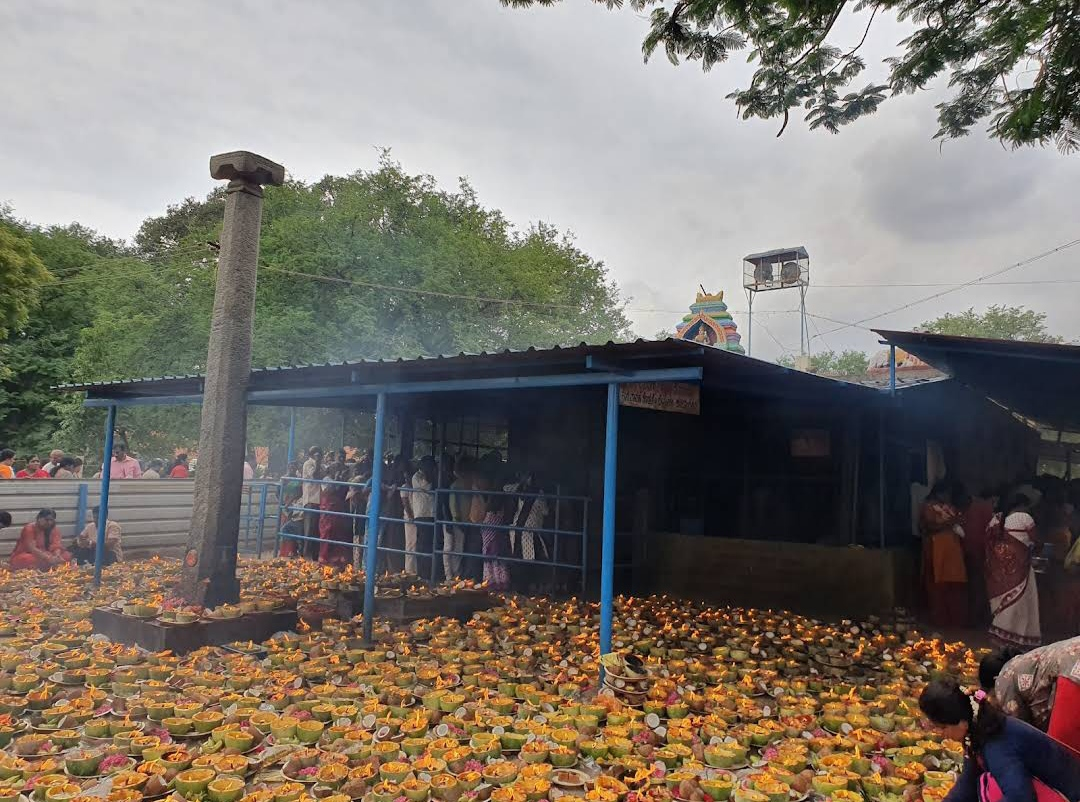
Burning of ash gourd lamp at Kalabhaireshwara temple

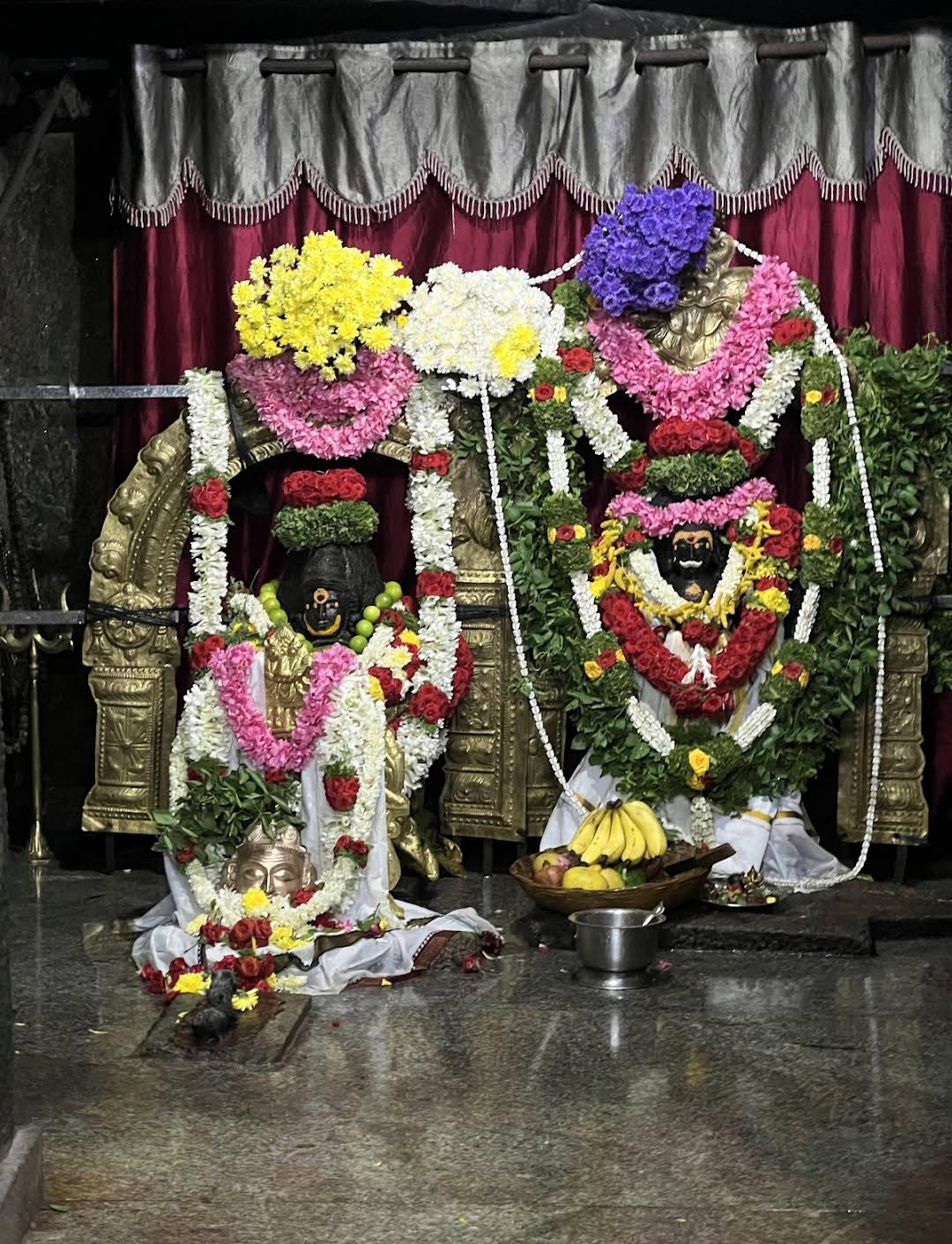
Sri Kalabhaireshwara temple

The temple remains open only on special occasions (festivals) and on Ashtami, which falls on the eighth day after Amavasya. Every month on Ashtami, thousands of worshippers come here to worship the deity by lighting an ash gourd lamp during Rahu Kala.

== Gallery ==
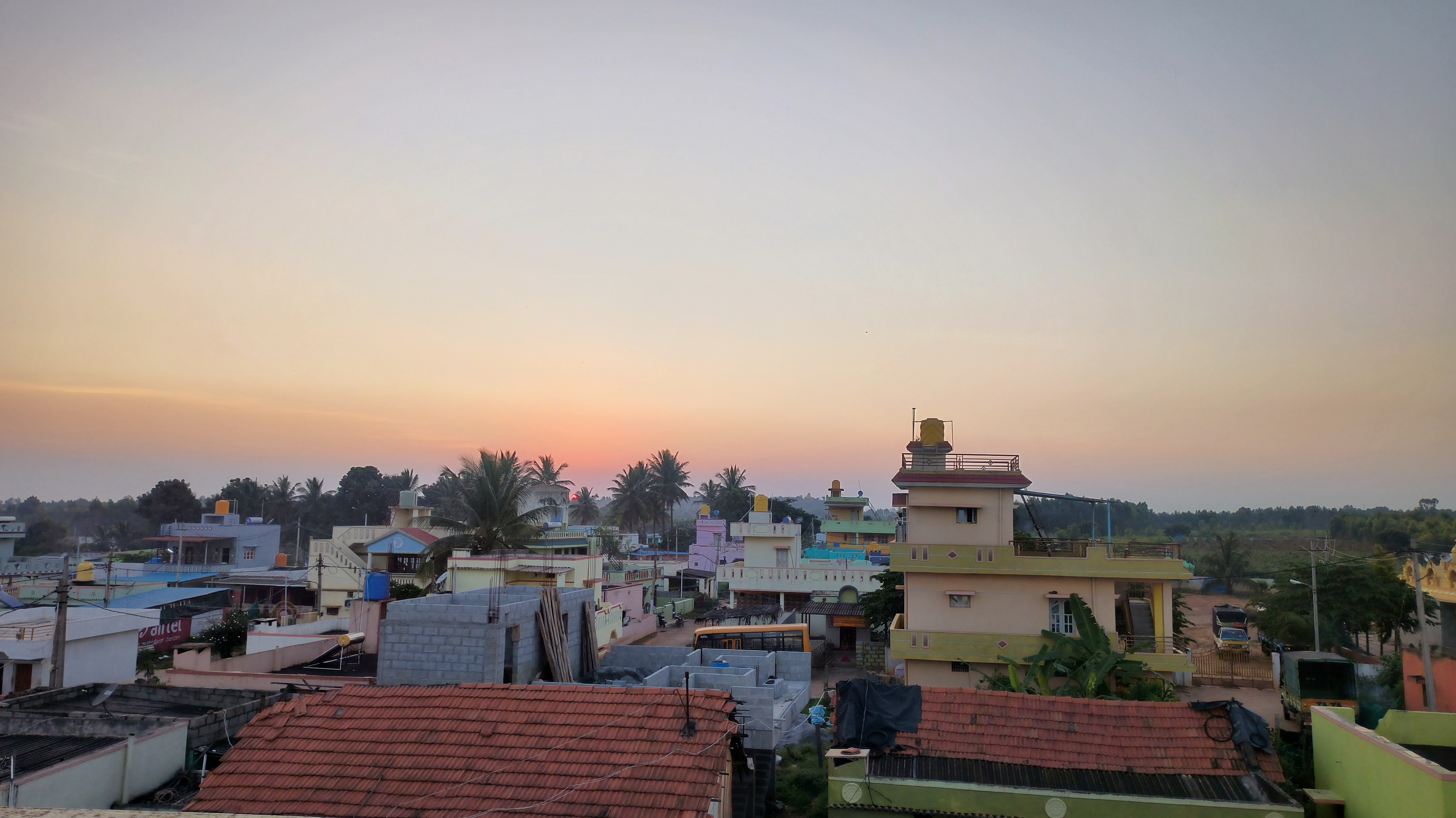
Village view

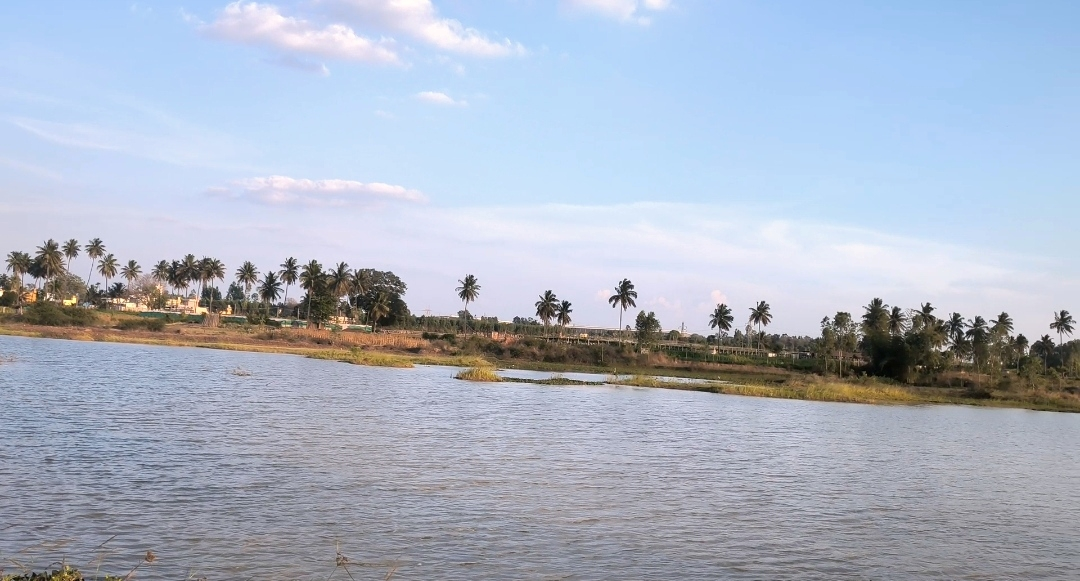
Jadigenahalli Lake

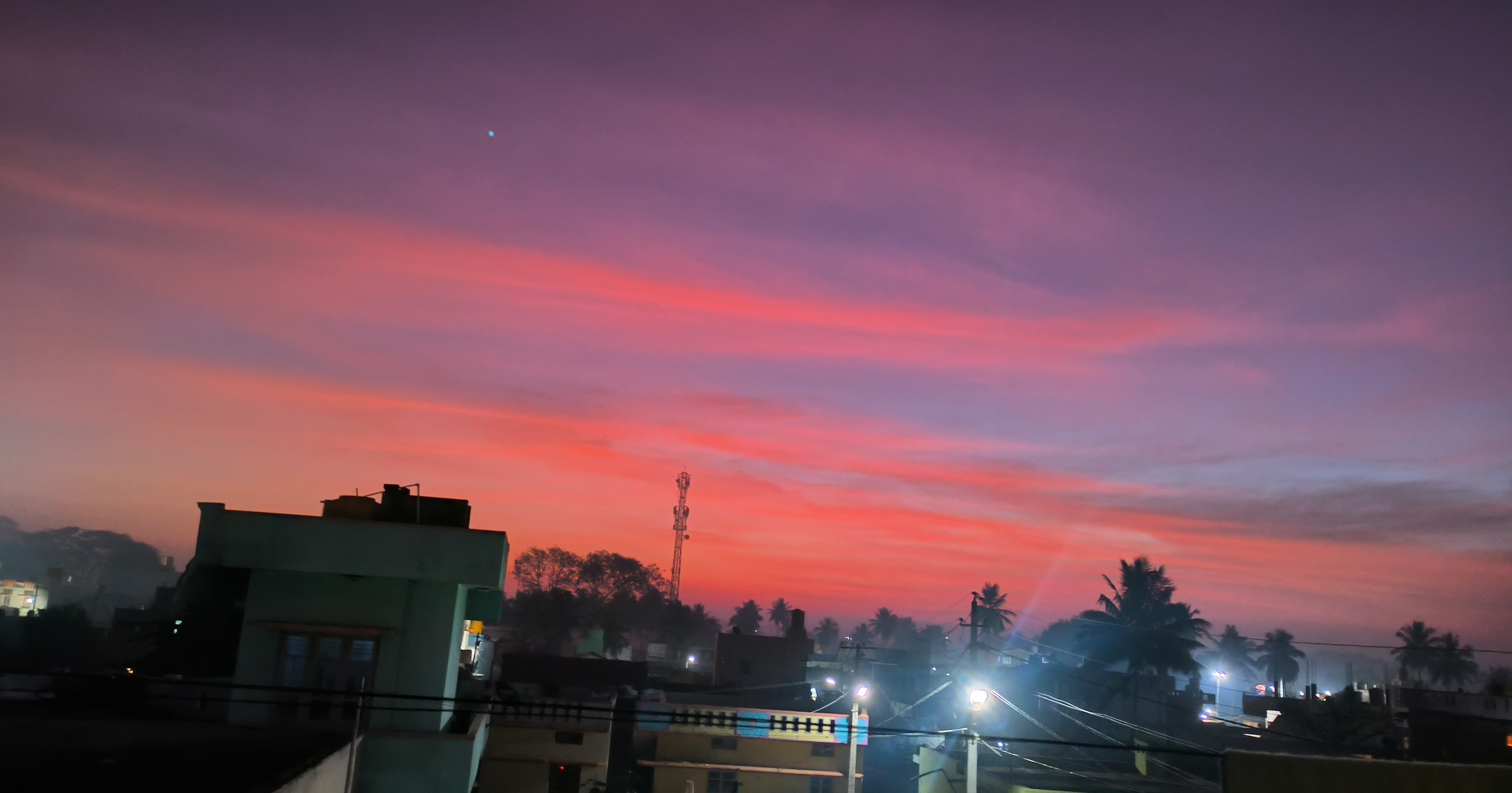
Sunrise view

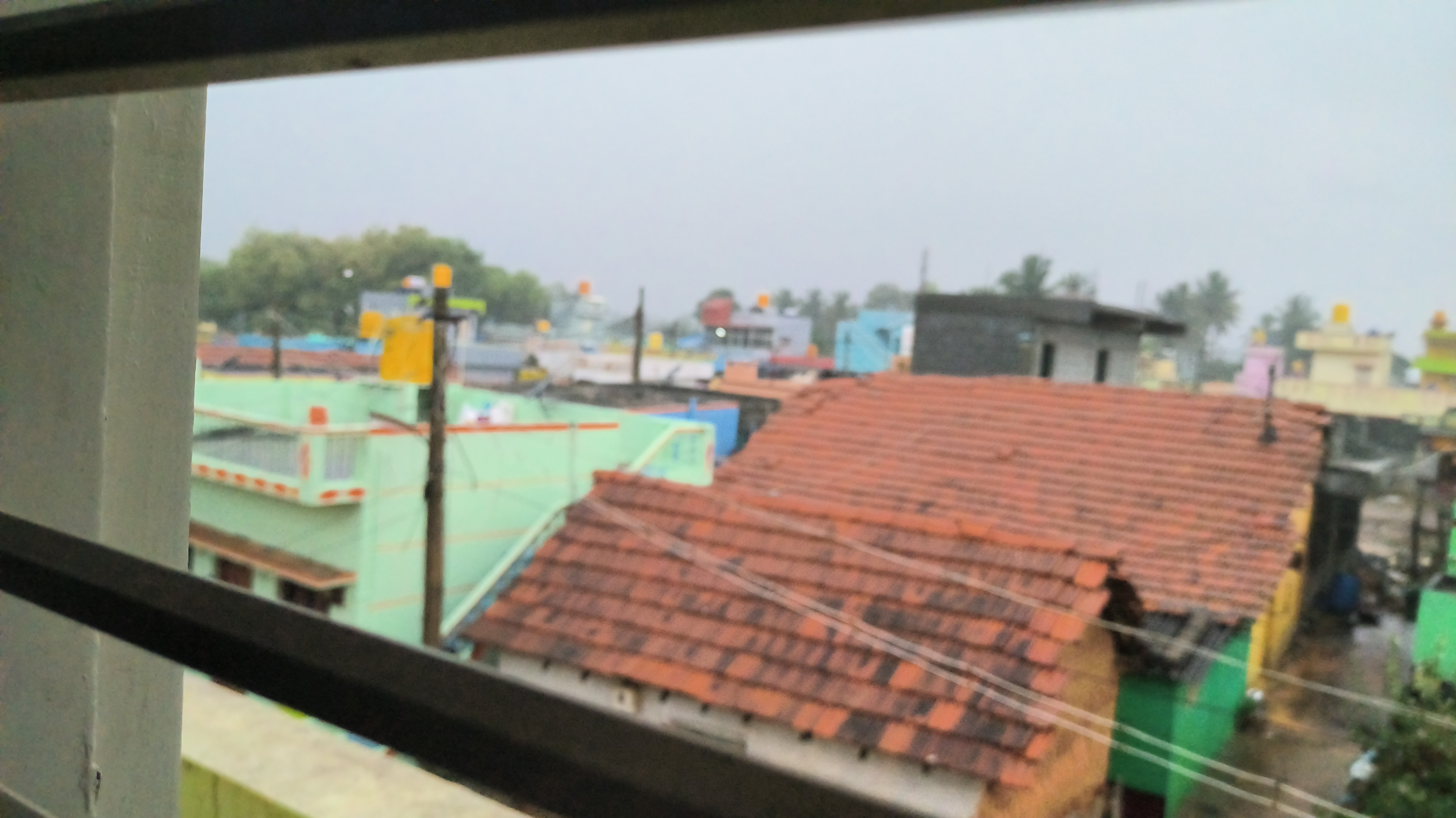
During rain

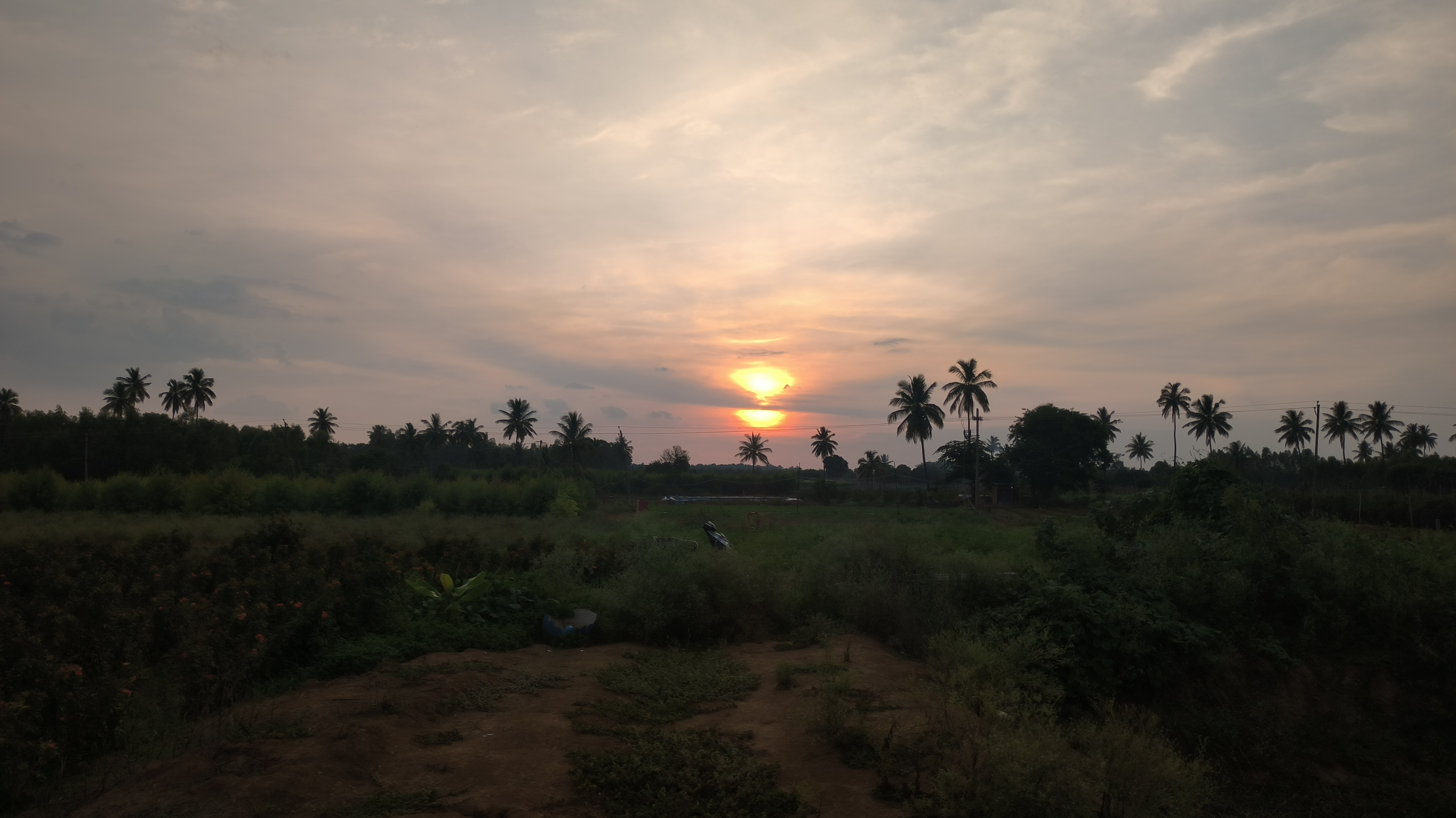
Jadigenahalli

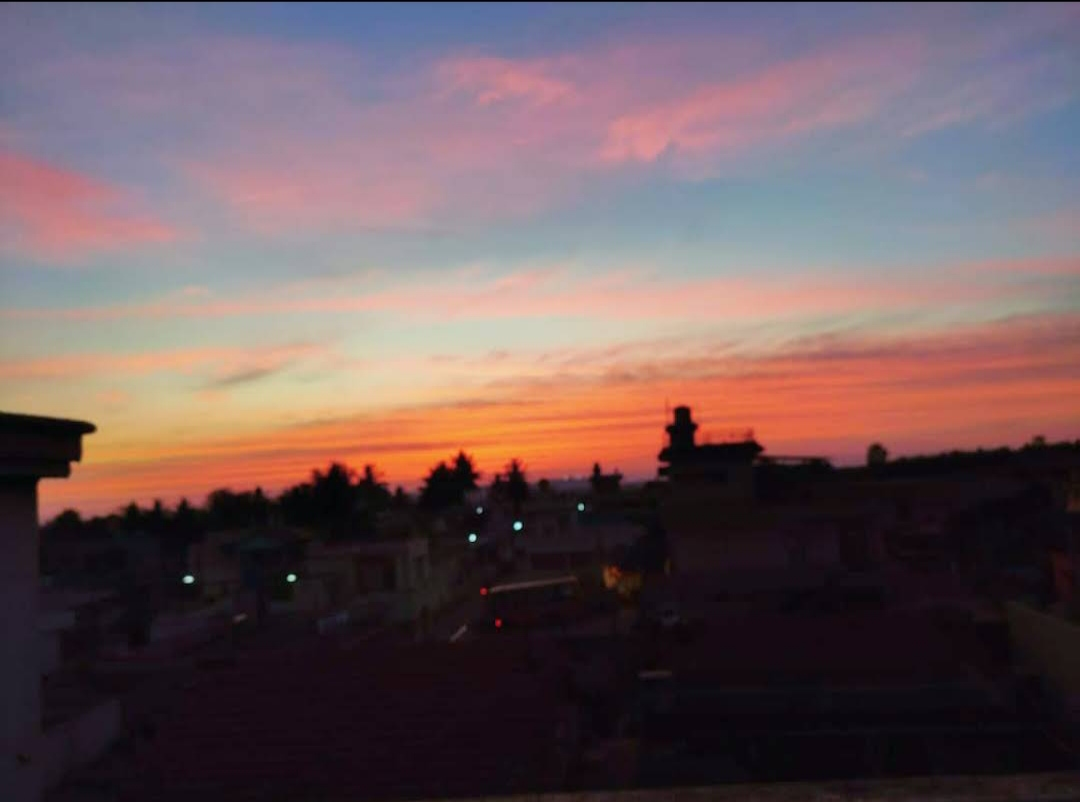
Evening view

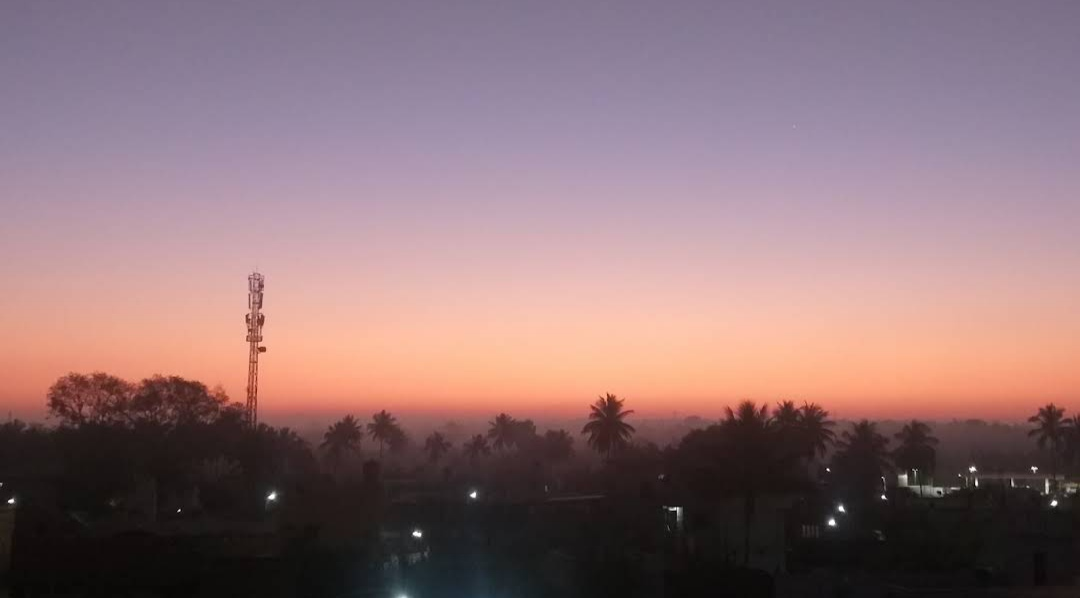
Evening view

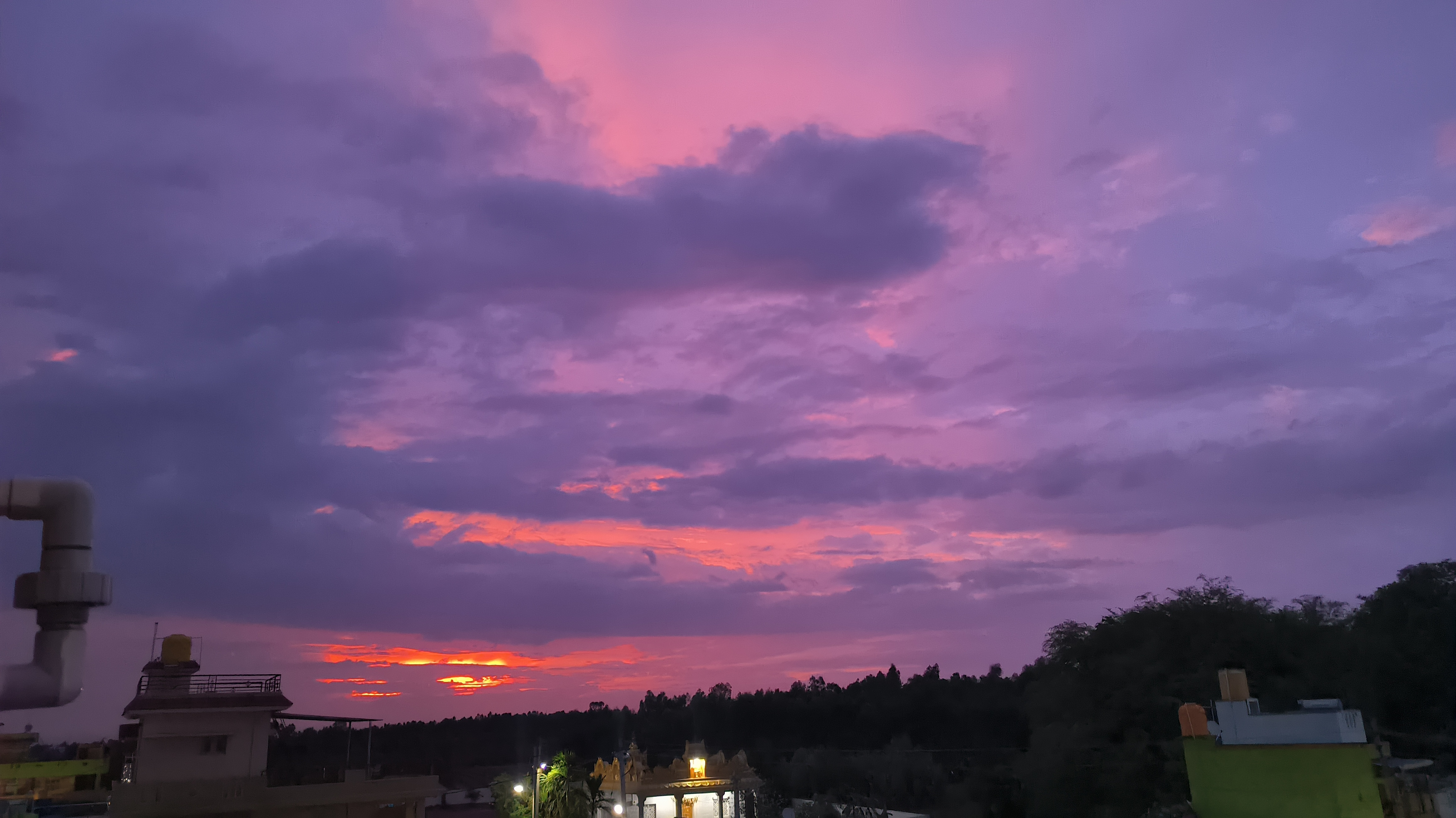
Evening view

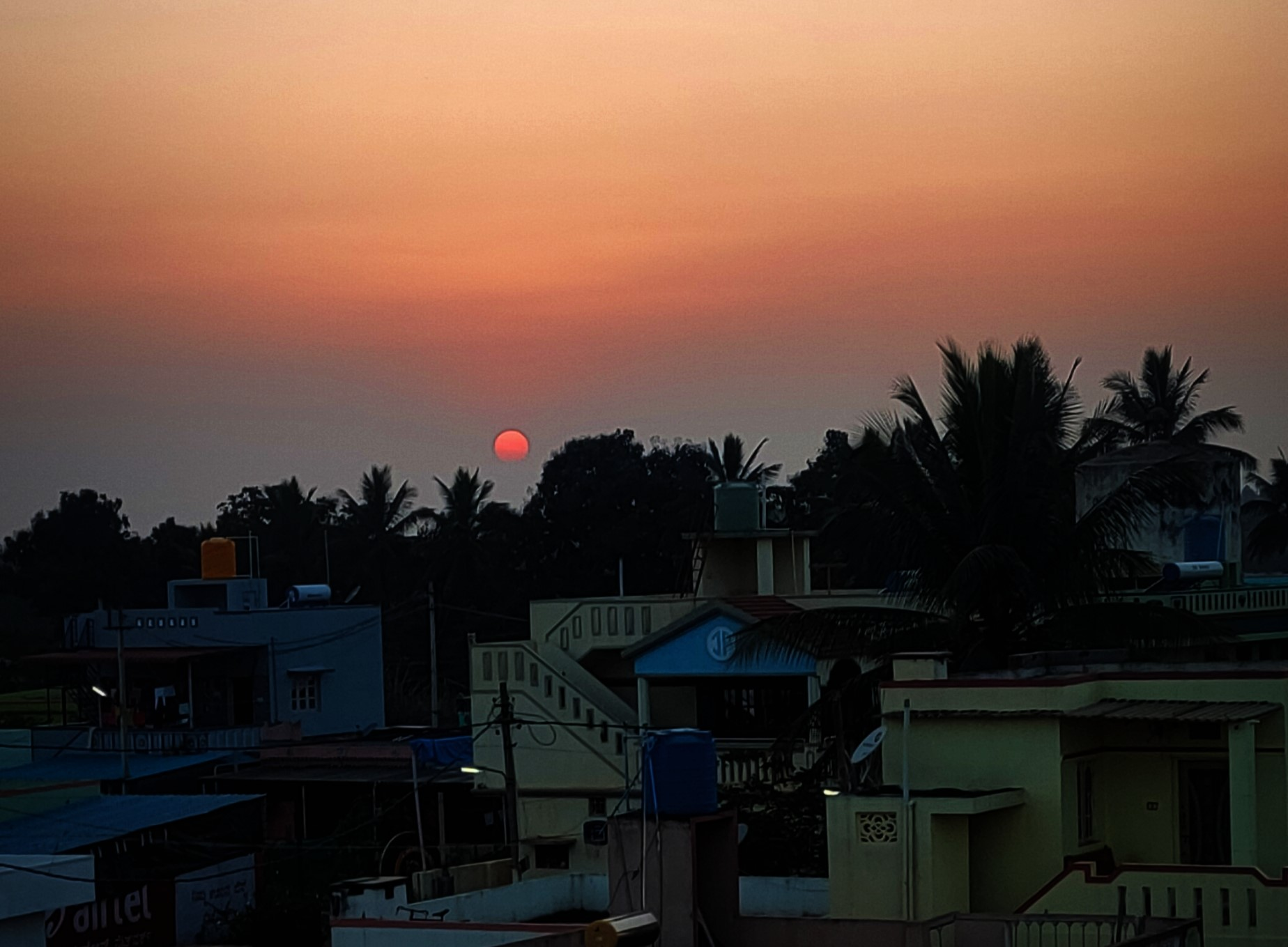
Sunset view
