= C. V. Raman Nagar Assembly constituency =

Legislative Assembly constituency in Karnataka, India

Coordinates: 12.983°N 77.662°E

C. V. Raman Nagar
- Constituency No. 161 for the Karnataka Legislative Assembly

Constituency details
- Country: India
- Region: South India
- State: Karnataka
- District: Bangalore Urban
- Lok Sabha constituency: Bangalore Central
- Established: 2008
- Total electors: 271,340
- Reservation: None

Member of Legislative Assembly
- 16th Karnataka Legislative Assembly
- Incumbent S. Raghu
- Party: Bharatiya Janata Party
- Elected year: 2023

CV Raman Nagar Assembly constituency is one of the 224 constituencies in the Karnataka Legislative Assembly of Karnataka, a southern state of India. It is a part of Bangalore Central Lok Sabha constituency. As of 2023, its representative is S. Raghu of the Bharatiya Janata Party.

== Members of the Legislative Assembly ==
Election	Name	Party
Before 2008: Constituency did not exist
2008	S. Raghu	Bharatiya Janata Party
2013	S. Raghu	Bharatiya Janata Party
2018	S. Raghu	Bharatiya Janata Party
2023	S. Raghu	Bharatiya Janata Party

== Election results ==
=== Assembly Election 2023 ===
2023 Karnataka Legislative Assembly election : C. V. Raman Nagar
Party	Candidate	Votes	%	±%
BJP	S. Raghu	69,228	53.53	▲8.92
INC	S. Anand Kumar	52,833	40.85	▲5.50
AAP	Mohan Dasari	2,967	2.29	▲0.81
NOTA	None of the above	1,999	1.55	▼0.16
UPP	G. Chaitra	892	0.69	New
Margin of victory		16,395	12.68	▲3.42
Turnout		129,392	47.69	▼1.39
Total valid votes		129,325		
Registered electors		271,340		▲0.87
BJP hold		Swing	▲8.92	

=== Assembly Election 2018 ===
2018 Karnataka Legislative Assembly election : C. V. Raman Nagar
Party	Candidate	Votes	%	±%
BJP	S. Raghu	58,887	44.61	▼14.10
INC	R. Sampath Raj	46,660	35.35	▼14.10
JD(S)	P. Ramesh	20,478	15.51	▲12.02
NOTA	None of the above	2,261	1.71	New
AAP	Mohan Dasari	1,956	1.48	New
Margin of victory		12,227	9.26	
Turnout		132,042	49.08	▼4.77
Total valid votes		132,011		
Registered electors		269,010		▲36.43
BJP hold		Swing	▼14.10	

=== Assembly Election 2013 ===
2013 Karnataka Legislative Assembly election : C. V. Raman Nagar
Party	Candidate	Votes	%	±%
BJP	S. Raghu	53,364	50.26	▲5.68
INC	P. Ramesh	44,945	42.33	▲15.07
JD(S)	J. Hemalatha Suresh Raj	3,174	3.49	▼6.26
KJP	A. Ravi Kumar	1,058	1.16	New
Independent	M. Shivashankar	822	0.90	New
BSP	B. T. Srinivas	645	0.71	▼0.46
Margin of victory		8,419	9.26	▼9.38
Turnout		106,185	53.85	▲13.18
Total valid votes		90,895		
Registered electors		197,180		▼10.23
BJP hold		Swing	▲5.68	

=== Assembly Election 2008 ===
2008 Karnataka Legislative Assembly election : C. V. Raman Nagar
Party	Candidate	Votes	%	±%
BJP	S. Raghu	47,369	53.03	
INC	K. C. Vijayakumar	30,714	34.38	
JD(S)	S. Manohar	8,711	9.75	
BSP	B. T. Srinivas	1,044	1.17	
Independent	I. Venkatesh	879	0.98	
KCVP	N. Gopi	611	0.68	
Margin of victory		16,655	18.64	
Turnout		89,334	40.67	
Total valid votes		89,328		
Registered electors		219,661		
BJP win (new seat)				

== See also ==
- Bangalore Urban district
- List of constituencies of Karnataka Legislative Assembly
