= Huskur, Bengaluru East =

- Village
- Location in Karnataka, India Huskur, Bengaluru East (India)
- Coordinates: 13.0625356°N 77.7414052°E
- Country: India
- State: Karnataka
- District: Bangalore
- Talukas: Bangalore East

Population (2011)
  - Total: 1,444

Languages
  - Official: Kannada
- Time zone: UTC+5:30 (IST)
- PIN: 560049
- Telephone code: 080
- Vehicle registration: KA 53
- Lok Sabha constituency: Bangalore Central (Lok Sabha constituency)
- Legislative Assembly: Mahadevapura Assembly constituency

Huskur, also known as Jodi Huskur, is a village in the southern state of Karnataka, India. Huskur village is located in Bangalore East taluka of Bangalore Urban district in Karnataka, India. It is situated 10 km away from Krishnarajapuram and around 8 km from Hoskote. As per 2009 stats, Mandur is the gram panchayat of Huskur village.

== Demographics ==
According to 2011 census of India information the location code or village code of Huskur village is 613098. The total geographical area of the village is 159.61 hectares. Huskur has a total population of 1,444 people, out of which male population is 743 while female population is 701. The literacy rate of Huskur village is 67.52 % out of which 72.27 % of males and 62.48 % of females are literate. There are about 350 houses in Huskur village. Pincode of Huskur village locality is 560049.

== Facilities ==
Huskur has below basic types of facilities.

- Govt Higher Primary School Jodi Huskuru – The school is owned by the Government of Karnataka.
- KMF (Karnataka Milk Federation) Dairy
- National Highway-75 – Old Madras Road- Connects Bengaluru and Tirupati

== Places of Worship ==
- Maramma Devi temple
- Someshwara Swamy temple

== See also ==
- Nimbekaipura
- Lagumenahalli
- Bendiganahalli
- Raghuvanahalli
