= Manjula Aravind Limbavali =

Indian politician (born 1975)

Manjula Aravind Limbavali (born 1975) is an Indian politician from Karnataka. She is a member of the Karnataka Legislative Assembly from Mahadevapura Assembly constituency which is reserved for Scheduled Caste community in Bangalore Urban district. She won the 2023 Karnataka Legislative Assembly election representing the Bharatiya Janata Party.

== Early life and education ==
Manjula is from White Field, Bengaluru. She is the wife of three-time MLA and former minister Arvind Limbavalli. She completed her Class 12 in 1992 at NMKRV college for women, Bangalore.

== Career ==
Manjula was elected in the Mahadevapura Assembly constituency representing the Bharatiya Janata Party in the 2023 Karnataka Legislative Assembly election. She polled 181,731 votes and defeated her nearest rival, H. Nagesh of the Indian National Congress, by a margin of 44,501 votes. Her husband, Arvind Limbavalli, was the sitting MLA and a minister, but was denied a ticket by the Bharatiya Janata Party, allegedly due to an old controversy. His name was missing in the first two lists as the party which feared anti incumbency vote, announced his wife, Manjula's name in the third list on 18 April 2023. Mahadevapura is one of the 17 wards in the city, who contribute the highest taxes to BBMP but have least civic amenities.
