= Aravind Limbavali =

Indian politician

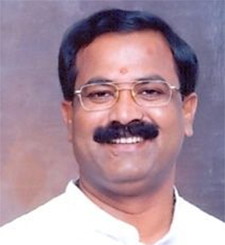

Minister of Forest Government of Karnataka
- In office 21 January 2021 – 28 July 2021
- Chief Minister: B. S. Yediyurappa
- Preceded by: Anand Singh
- Succeeded by: Umesh Katti

Minister of Kannada & Culture Government of Karnataka
- In office 21 January 2021 – 28 July 2021
- Chief Minister: B. S. Yediyurappa
- Preceded by: C. T. Ravi
- Succeeded by: V. Sunil Kumar

Minister of Health & Family Welfare Government of Karnataka
- In office 12 July 2012 – 13 May 2013
- Chief Minister: Jagadish Shettar
- Preceded by: B. Sriramulu
- Succeeded by: U. T. Khader

Minister of Higher Education Government of Karnataka
- In office 7 June 2008 – 23 September 2010
- Chief Minister: B. S. Yediyurappa
- Preceded by: D. H. Shankaramurthy
- Succeeded by: V. S. Acharya

Member of Karnataka Legislative Assembly
- In office 2008–2023
- Preceded by: Constituency established
- Constituency: Mahadevapura

Member of Karnataka Legislative Council
- In office 15 June 2004 – 27 May 2008
- Succeeded by: G. M. Madhu
- Constituency: elected by Legislative Assembly members

Personal details
- Born: 1 February 1967 (age 59) Bagalkot, Mysore State, India
- Party: Bharatiya Janata Party
- Spouse: Manjula
- Education: B.E. (Civil)
- Alma mater: B.M.S. Institute of Technology and Management, BMS College of Engineering
- Website: bjparvind.com

Aravind Limbavali is an Indian politician who has served as a minister in the Karnataka government on four occasions. He is a member of the Karnataka Legislative Assembly and the Bharatiya Janata Party (BJP). He has been a member of the Legislative Assembly for the Mahadevapura constituency from 2008 to 2023.

== Personal life ==
Aravind Limbavali was born on 1 February 1967 in Bagalkot, Mysuru State, India.

== Political career ==
He joined the Rashtriya Swayamsevak Sangh (RSS) student wing as a student and has been involved with the RSS for over 35 years. He has also been an active member for Akhil Bharatiya Vidyarthi Parishad (ABVP), serving as its national secretary from 1992–1995 and leading it's "Save the Campus" campaign.

As a student, Libavali was part of the Karnataka team that selected five student leaders for the "Kashmir Chalo" movement. Limbavali was one of the five students chosen to raise the tri-color flag in Srinagar. The team reached Udhampur and was prevented from going further.

In 2012, the Karnataka High Court stayed proceedings against Limbavali in an unauthorized construction complaint and acquitted him in the case.

Limbavali was elected to the Karnataka Legislative Assembly in the 2013 election from the Mahadevapura constituency with 110,244 votes, defeating Srinivasa A.C. of the Indian National Congress by 6149 votes. He was then re-elected in the Karnataka Assembly Elections held in May 2018 from the Mahadevapura constituency.

In an interview with Dighvijay News, Limbavali defended his directing of police to remove an activist from a protest, claiming that as long as he had not raped her, the episode should not be an issue. The use of word rape while describing the argument was met with public outcry.

=== Madhya Pradesh political crisis ===
In March 2020, Limbavali was responsible for sequestering BJP members from Madhya Pradesh at a resort in Bengaluru, while Jyotiraditya Scindia led a mass-defection that resulted in the fall of the Kamal Nath government. The Deccan Chronicle wrote that "Limbavali, 53, is so skillful at managing horsetrading manouevres [sic] that the media here has been finding it difficult to track down exact the whereabouts of the herd of 19."
