= S. Raghu =

Indian politician

Member of the Karnataka Legislative Assembly
- Incumbent
- Assumed office 2008
- Constituency: CV Raman Nagar

Member of the Karnataka Legislative Assembly
- In office 2004–2008
- Preceded by: M. Muniswamy
- Succeeded by: N. A. Haris
- Constituency: Shanti Nagar

Personal details
- Born: 2 May 1969 (age 56)

S. Raghu (born 2 May 1969) is an Indian politician from Bengaluru, Karnataka. He is a member of Karnataka Legislative Assembly for CV Raman Nagar and represents Bharatiya Janta Party [BJP].
