= Budigere =

Coordinates: 13°08′N 77°45′E

Budigere Basma rekhapuri
- Small town in Devanahalli taluk
- Interactive map of Budigere
- Country: India
- State: Karnataka
- District: Bengaluru North
- Talukas: Devanahalli

Population (2001)
  - Total: 5,063

Languages
  - Official: Kannada
- Time zone: UTC+5:30 (IST)
- PIN: 562165
- Lok Sabha constituency: Chikkaballupura
- Vidhan Sabha constituency: Devanahalli

Budigere is a small town in the southern state of Karnataka, India. It is located in the Devanahalli taluk of Bengaluru North district.

== Demographics ==
As of 2001 India census, Budigere had a population of 5063+ with 2606+ males and 2457+ females.

== See also ==
- Bengaluru North district
- Districts of Karnataka
- Nimbekaipura
- Konadasapura
