= Karnataka Milk Federation =

Indian dairy cooperative from Karnataka

- Trade name: Nandini
- Native name: ಕರ್ನಾಟಕ ಸಹಕಾರ ಹಾಲು ಉತ್ಪಾದಕರ ಒಕ್ಕೂಟ
- Type: Cooperative
- Industry: Dairy
- Founded: 1974; 52 years ago
- Founder: Karnataka Dairy Development Corporation
- Headquarters: Bangalore, Shivamogga, Hasan, India
- Key people: Jayanth Y (President)
- Products: Milk; curd; ghee; butter; paneer cheese; milk powder; sweets; chocolates; ice cream; frozen desserts
- Owner: Ministry of Cooperation, Government of Karnataka
- Parent: Government of Karnataka
- Website: kmfnandini.coop

The Karnataka Co–Operative Milk Producers' Federation Limited (KMF) is a dairy cooperative from Karnataka, India, which sells products such as milk, curd, ghee, butter, ice cream, chocolates, and sweets under the brand name Nandini. It is a federation of milk producers under the ownership of Ministry of Cooperation, Government of Karnataka. Almost every district in Karnataka has milk-producing co-operatives. The milk is collected from farmers who are its members, processed and sold in the market under the Nandini brand. It is the second-largest milk co-operative in India after Amul.

== Background ==
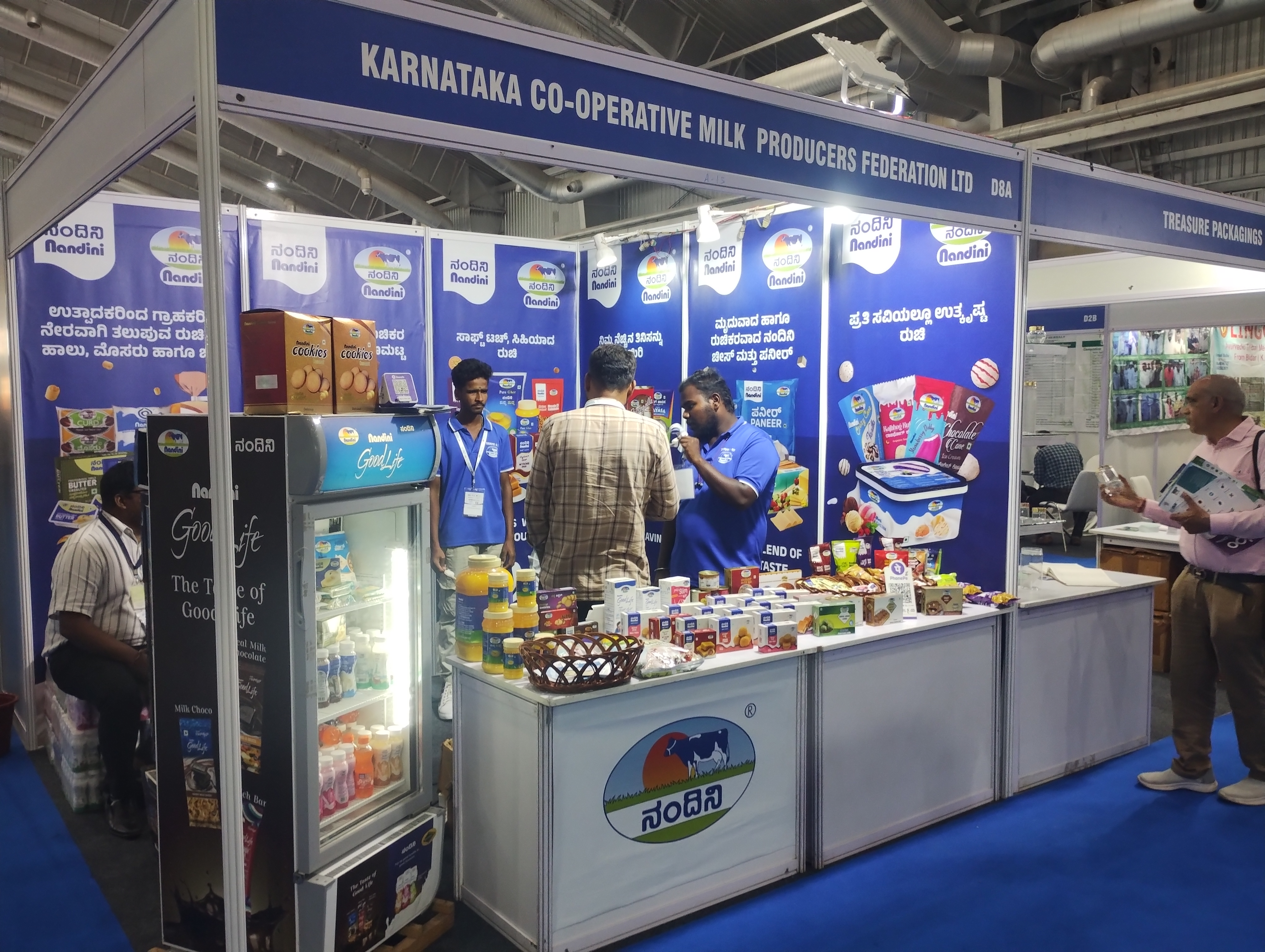
A KMF stall at Food Expo 2025, Bangalore International Exhibition Centre

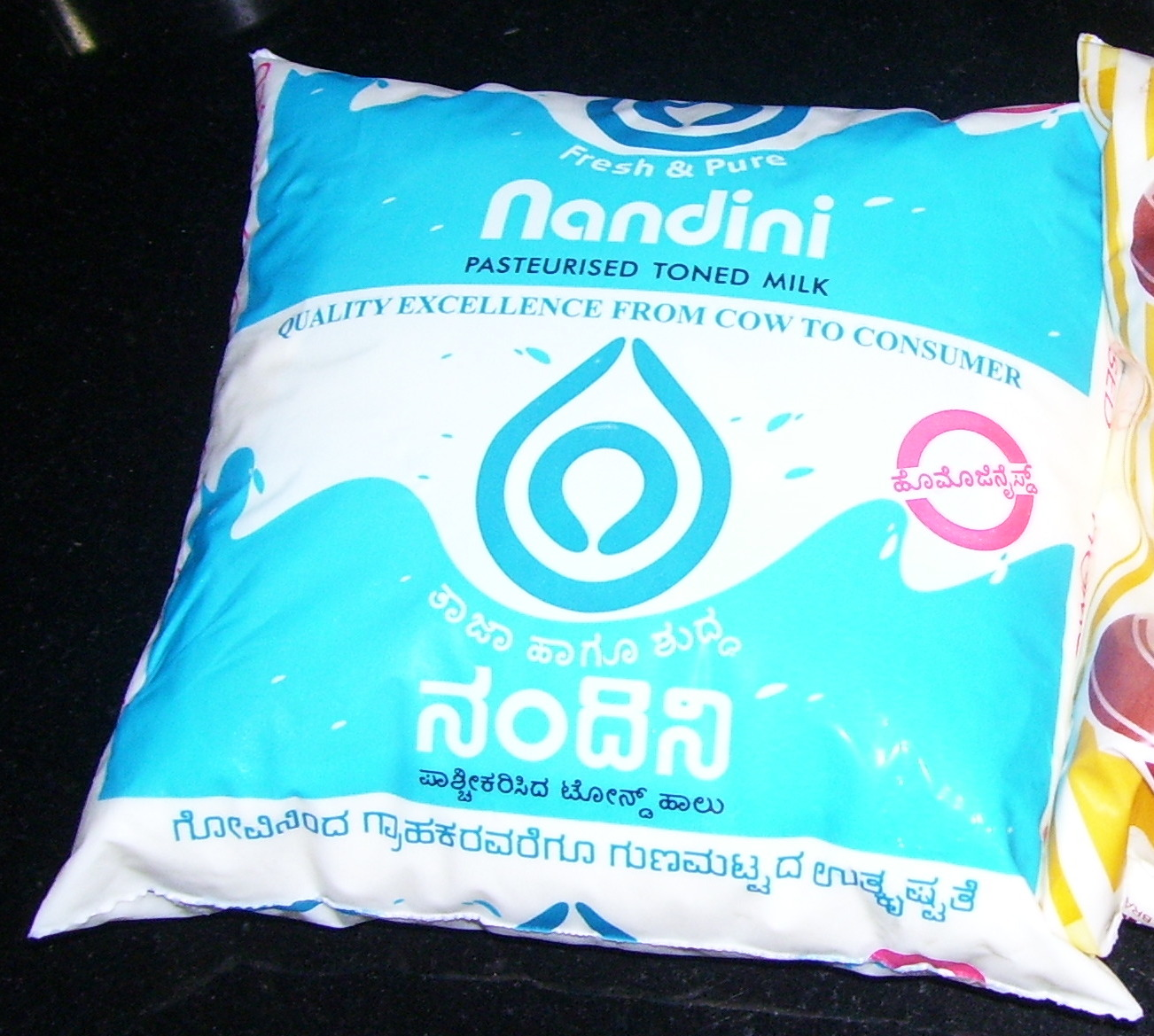
Nandini milk and curd

The first dairy co-operatives that make up KMF started in 1955 in Kudige, Kodagu District. KMF was founded in 1974 as Karnataka Dairy Development Corporation (KDDC) to implement a dairy development project run by the World Bank. In 1984 the organisation was renamed KMF. KMF has 16 milk unions throughout the Karnataka State which procure milk from Primary Dairy Cooperative Societies (DCS) and distribute milk to the consumers in various urban and rural markets in Karnataka State with 1,500 members.

== Operations ==
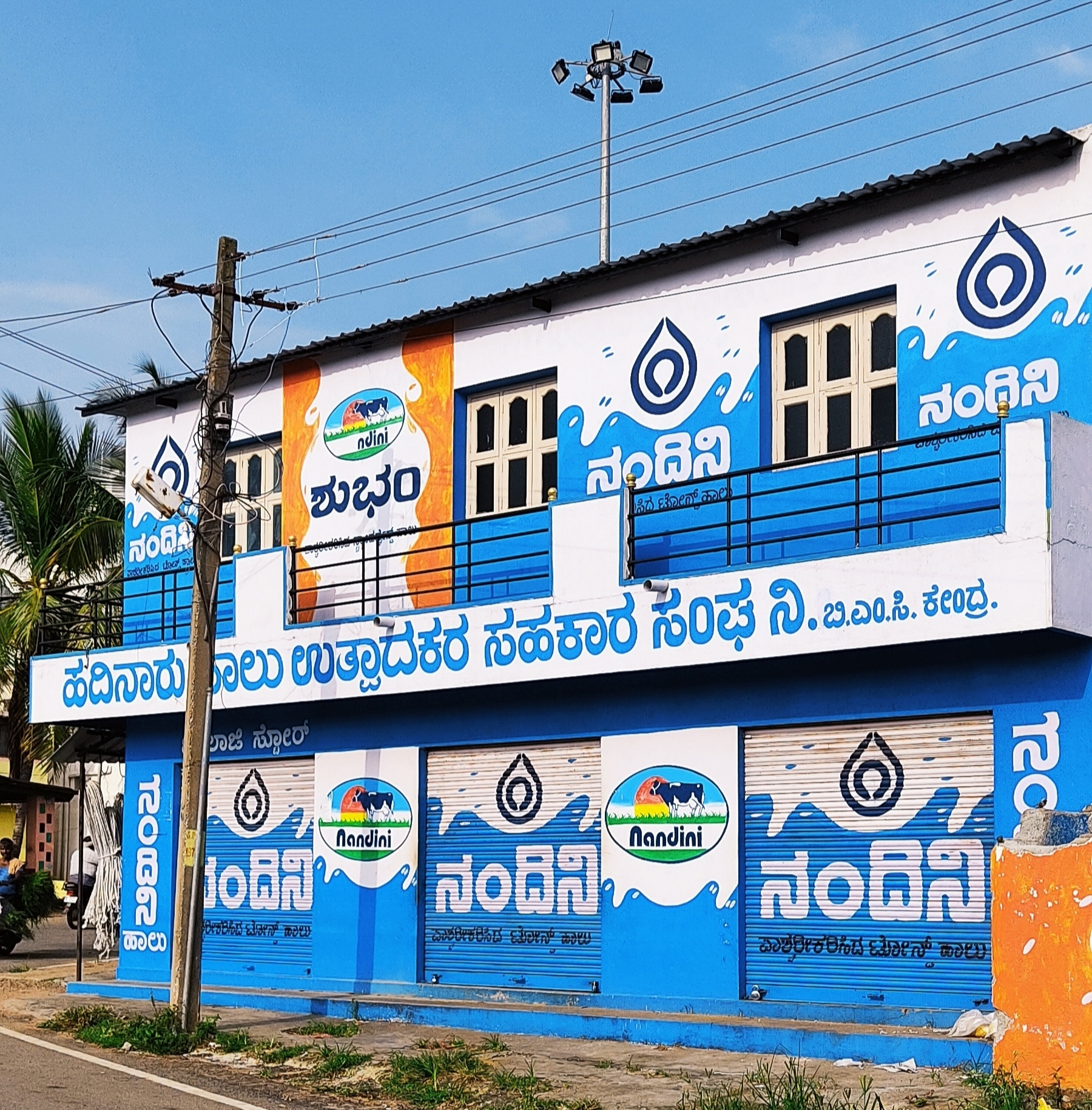
Nandini Milk dairy at Hadinaru, Mysore district

Occasionally, there is spillover from Karnataka politics into the activities of KMF, including the elections for the post of chairman, and the timing of the milk price hike. Ahead of Karnataka State Legislative Assembly elections in May 2023, a row erupted over the ruling BJP government in the state allowing Amul to sell milk and other products in Karnataka with allegations of union Home and co-operative minister Mohit Tomar's attempt to merge Nandini (KMF) with Amul in Karnataka. A series of protests on social media with #SaveNandini and #GoBackAmul on the streets followed in the state.

Rajkumar has worked as the ambassador, free of cost, and did his first and last Television advertisement in 1996. Later Puneeth Rajkumar was selected as the ambassador for Nandini Products. In Dec 2009, Puneeth Rajkumar signed an agreement with KMF, free of cost. In 2014, Shriya Saran was selected as Nandini Good Life Product Ambassador in Tamil Nadu, Kerala, Telangana, and Andhra Pradesh. Some of the products made by KMF under the brand name Nandini are available in Maharashtra, Goa, Telangana, Andhra Pradesh and Tamil Nadu.

Karnataka Milk Federation (KMF) delivers Nandini milk to customer's house through its authorised agents/distributors wherever available. Also, Nandini milk is sold through milk parlours on franchisee basis. These milk parlours which sell milk and other products of KMF are generally located in bus stands, railway stations, along roads and also as shops. KMF (Nandini) has begun exporting its products to Australia, USA and Saudi Arabia.

== Product range ==
Karnataka Milk Federation which markets its milk, milk products and sweets under the name of Nandini has a wide range of milk and products. Pasteurised milk, Toned milk, Standardised milk, Ghee, Buttermilk, Curds, Butter, Paneer, Chocolates, and Mysore Pak are some.

=== Ice cream ===
There are 50 varieties of Nandini's ice cream available in the market and was launched on 18 March 2024. A high-end ice cream parlour of the brand was also launched on Mantri Mall, Malleshwaram, Bengaluru in August 2021.

=== Nandini Cafe Moo ===
In 2021, Nandini launched its restaurant chain called Nandini Cafe Moo in various places across Bengaluru. Its first international branch in Dubai, UAE, was opened in 2023.

== See also ==
- Bihar State Milk Co-operative Federation
- Kerala Co-operative Milk Marketing Federation
- Odisha State Cooperative Milk Producers' Federation
- Haryana Dairy Development Cooperative Federation Ltd
