= Bangalore Central Lok Sabha constituency =

Constituency in Karnataka, India

Coordinates: 12.99°N 77.61°E

Bangaluru Central
- Lok Sabha constituency
- Bangaluru Central Lok Sabha constituency map

Constituency details
- Country: India
- Region: South India
- State: Karnataka
- Assembly constituencies: Sarvagnanagar; C. V. Raman Nagar; Shivajinagar; Shanti Nagar; Gandhi Nagar; Rajaji Nagar; Chamrajpet; Mahadevapura
- Established: 2008
- Total electors: 19,31,456
- Reservation: None

Member of Parliament
- 18th Lok Sabha
- Incumbent P. C. Mohan
- Party: BJP
- Elected year: 2024

Bangaluru Central Lok Sabha constituency is one of the 28 Lok Sabha constituencies in Karnataka state in southern India. This constituency was created in 2008 as part of delimitation. It was carved out of the Bangaluru North and South Lok Sabha constituencies during 2009 Indian elections. It first held elections in 2009 and its first member of parliament (MP) was P. C. Mohan

== Demographics ==
The Central Lok Sabha constituency is dominated by minority voters, and is challenge for candidates, with having to get the support of both linguistic and religious minorities. The constituency has around 5.5 lakh Tamil People, 4.5 lakh Muslims and about 2 lakh Christians. There is also a significant number of Marwaris and Gujaratis, especially around Chickpet and Gandhinagar suburbs. The Tamil population is concentrated around the suburbs of Shivajinagar, Ulsoor, Gandhinagar, Seshadripuram and are a deciding factor for the winning candidate. Further, the demography of the constituency ranges from rich to middle class to slums.

== Vidhan Sabha segments and serving MLAs ==
As of 2014, Bangalore Central Lok Sabha constituency presently comprises the following eight Legislative Assembly segments:

#	Name	District	Member	Party	Party Leading 2024 (By Number )
160	Sarvagnanagar	Bangalore Urban	K. J. George	INC	INC
161	C. V. Raman Nagar (SC)	Bangalore Urban	S. Raghu	BJP	BJP
162	Shivajinagar	Bangalore Urban	Rizwan Arshad	INC	INC
163	Shanti Nagar	Bangalore Urban	N. A. Haris	INC	INC
164	Gandhi Nagar	Bangalore Urban	Dinesh Gundu Rao	INC	BJP
165	Rajaji Nagar	Bangalore Urban	S. Suresh Kumar	BJP	BJP
168	Chamrajpet	Bangalore Urban	Zameer Ahmed	INC	INC
174	Mahadevapura (SC)	Bangalore Urban	Manjula Aravind Limbavali	BJP	BJP

== List of members of parliament ==
Year	Member	Party
Till 2008 : Constituency did not exist
2009	P. C. Mohan	Bharatiya Janata Party
2014	P. C. Mohan	Bharatiya Janata Party
2019	P. C. Mohan	Bharatiya Janata Party
2024	P. C. Mohan	Bharatiya Janata Party

== Election results ==
Vote share of winning candidates
2024	50.05%
2019	50.35%
2014	51.85%
2009	40.16%

=== General Election 2024 ===
2024 Indian general election: Bangaluru Central
Party	Candidate	Votes	%	±%
BJP	P. C. Mohan	658,915	50.05	−0.30
INC	Mansoor Ali Khan	626,208	47.57	+3.14
NOTA	None of the above	12,126	0.92	+0.02
Majority		32,707	2.48	−3.44
Turnout		13,18,346	54.16	−0.16
BJP hold		Swing	-0.30	

=== General election 2019 ===
2019 Indian general election: Bangaluru Central
Party	Candidate	Votes	%	±%
BJP	P. C. Mohan	602,853	50.35	−1.50
INC	Rizwan Arshad	531,885	44.43	+4.39
Independent	Prakash Raj	28,906	2.41	New
NOTA	None of the Above	10,760	0.90	+0.11
Margin of victory		70,968	5.92	−6.88
Turnout		1,197,687	54.32	−1.32
BJP hold		Swing	-1.50	

=== General election 2014 ===
2014 Indian general election: Bangaluru Central
Party	Candidate	Votes	%	±%
BJP	P. C. Mohan	557,130	51.85	+11.69
INC	Rizwan Arshad	419,630	39.05	+3.05
AAP	V. Balakrishnan	39,869	3.69	New
JD(S)	Nandini Ala	20,387	1.90	−17.29
NOTA	None of the above	8,449	0.79	New
Margin of victory		137,500	12.80	+8.63
Turnout		1,074,609	55.64	+11.09
BJP hold		Swing	+11.69	

=== General election 2009 ===
2009 Indian general elections: Bangaluru Central
Party	Candidate	Votes	%	±%
BJP	P. C. Mohan	340,162	40.16	
INC	H. T. Sangliana	304,944	36.00	
JD(S)	B. Z. Zameer Ahmed Khan	162,552	19.19	
Margin of victory		35,218	4.16	
Turnout		846,982	44.55	
BJP win (new seat)				

== Gallery ==
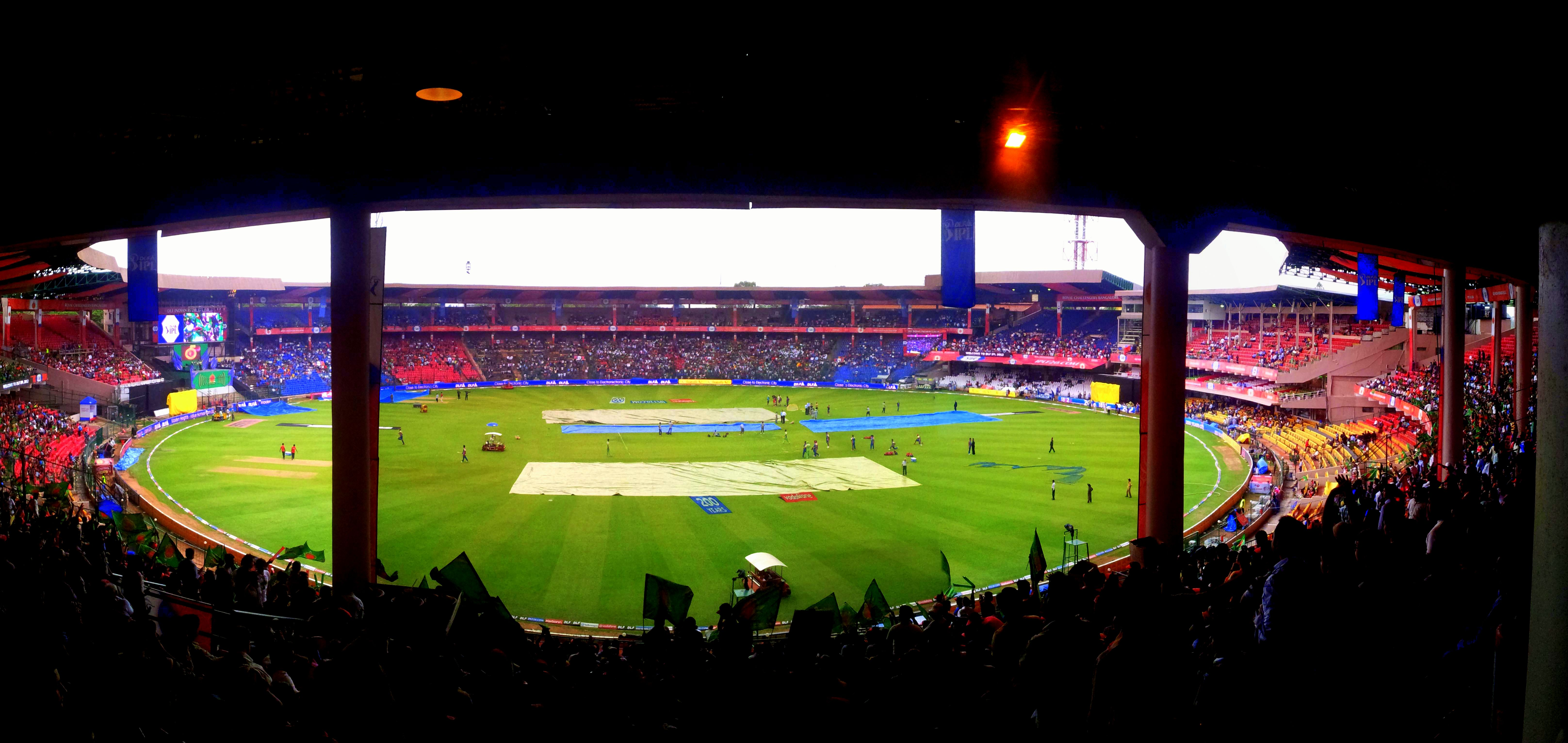
Chinnaswamy Stadium in Bangaluru falls under this constituency

== See also ==
- Bengaluru
- List of constituencies of the Lok Sabha
