= Krishnarajapuram =

Krishnarajapuram K.R. Pura
- Suburb
- Krishnarajapura
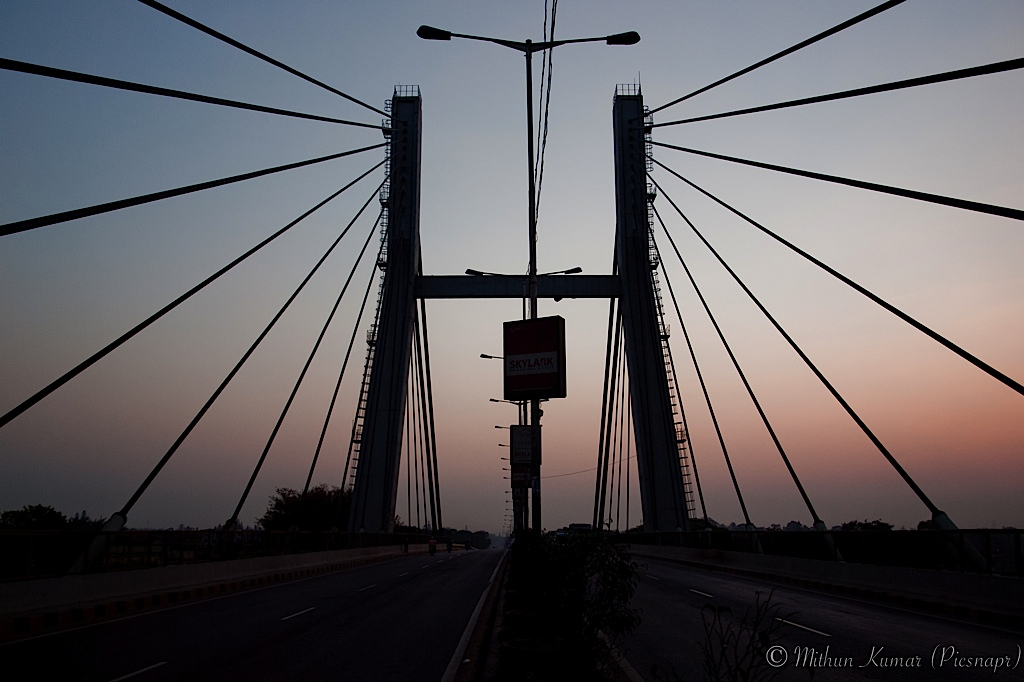
- A straight view of the hanging bridge built on the National Highway 75, right over the Krishnarajapuram Railway station

- Krishnarajapura
- Coordinates: 12.995°N 77.68°E
- Country: India
- State: Karnataka
- District: Bengaluru Urban
- Metro: Bengaluru
- Founder: Mummadi Krishna Raja Wodeyar

Government
  - Type: Municipal Corporation
  - Body: Greater Bengaluru Authority

Population (2001)
  - Total: 187,453

Languages
  - Official: Kannada
- Time zone: UTC+05:30 (IST)
- PIN: 560016, 560036, 560048, 560049, 560067
- Vehicle registration: KA-53

Krishnarajapura (also spelled as Krishnarajapuram and often abbreviated as K.R. Pura or K.R. Puram) is an eastern suburb of Bengaluru, the capital of the Indian state of Karnataka. It is one of the zones of GBA. It is 15 km (9.3 mi) from Bengaluru City Railway Station. The Old Madras Road passes through this locality. A lake called 'Vengayyana Lake' is in the heart of this area. The Yele Mallappa Shetty Lake near Medahalli, situated just outside the eastern limits of K.R. Pura, is one of the largest lakes in Bengaluru.

Krishnarajapura (K.R. Pura) is also the headquarters of the Bengaluru East taluk and houses certain central and state government offices. It is also a Karnataka Legislative Assembly constituency. B A Basvaraja of the Bharatiya Janata Party was elected as the Member of Legislative assembly from this constituency in the 2013 Karnataka Assembly election, and re-elected in 2018. The area is also a part of the Bengaluru North Lok Sabha constituency.

The area was named after Krishnaraja Wadiyar III, who ruled the provincial state of Mysuru from 1799 to 1869.

KR Pura is home to the historical Kote Temple complex, which houses the Kote Venkateshwara Swamy Temple.

kote venkateshwara swamy kr puram

== Connectivity ==
Krishnarajapura is located at the junction of Old Madras Road (OMR) and Outer Ring Road (ORR). The Krishnarajapuram Railway station falls on the Bengaluru - Chennai broad gauge line. The cable bridge on the junction of Old Madras Road and Outer Ring Road was built by Afcons for IRCON and inaugurated the by then Prime Minister of India, Atal Bihari Vajpayee in 2003 and was subsequently declared as the Most Outstanding National Bridge by the Indian Institution of Bridge Engineers.

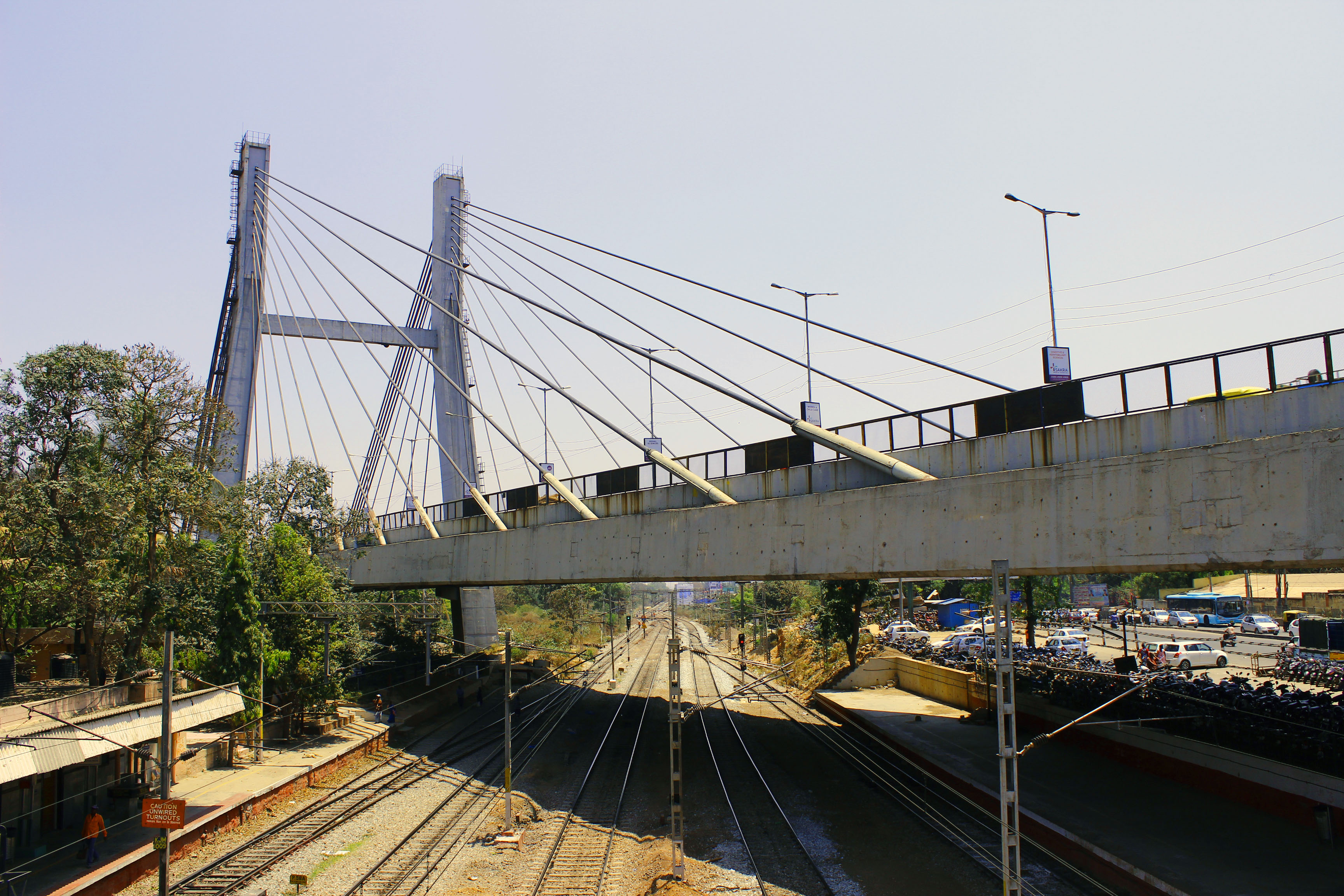
Cable stayed bridge on Old Madras Road (NH-4), above Krishnarajapuram railway station

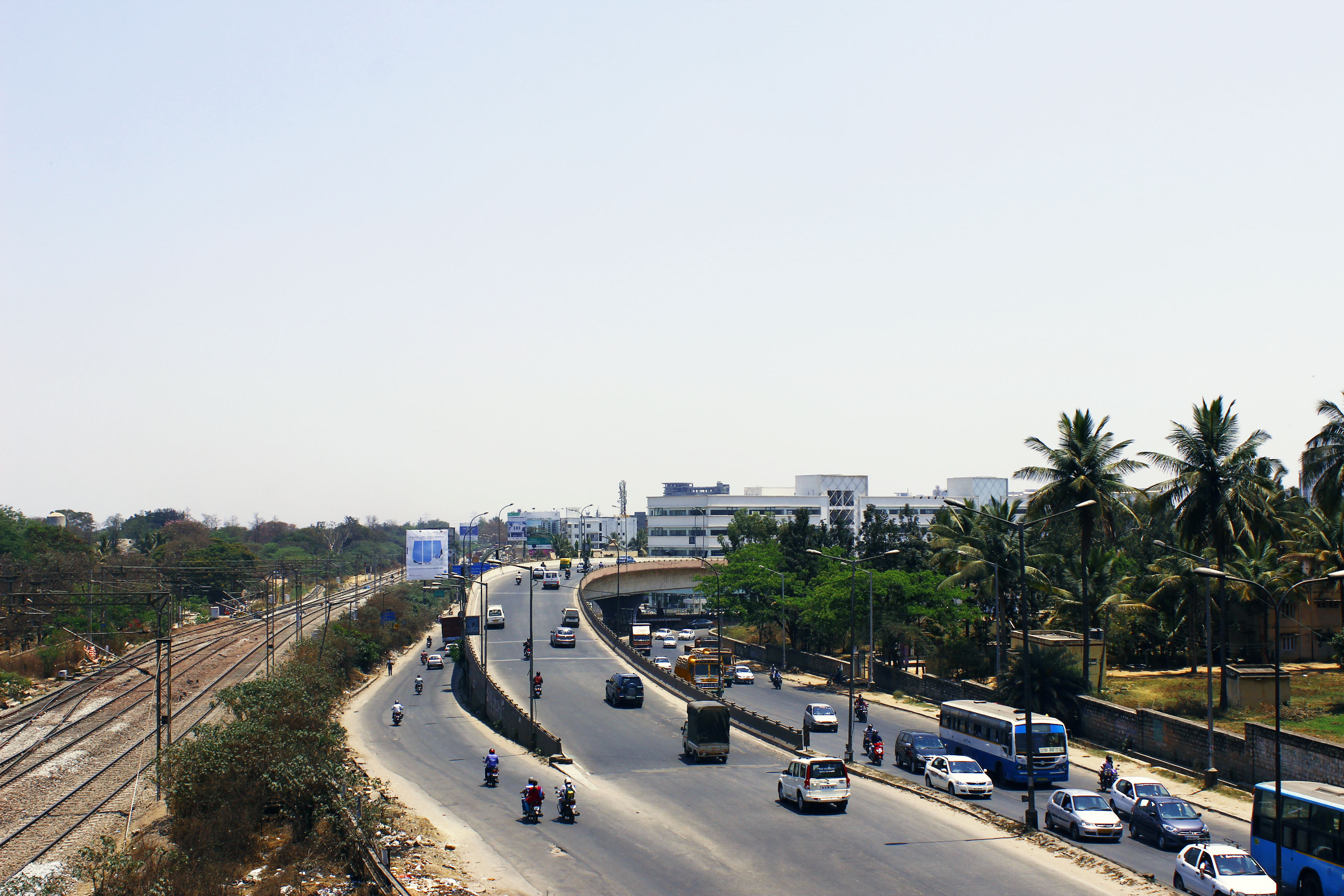
KR Pura Outer Ring Road flyover
