= Mahadevapura Assembly constituency =

Legislative Assembly constituency in Karnataka, India

Coordinates: 12.992°N 77.687°E

Mahadevapura
- Constituency No. 174 for the Karnataka Legislative Assembly

Constituency details
- Country: India
- Region: South India
- State: Karnataka
- District: Bangalore Urban
- Lok Sabha constituency: Bangalore Central
- Established: 2008
- Total electors: 607,255 (2023)
- Reservation: SC

Member of Legislative Assembly
- 16th Karnataka Legislative Assembly
- Incumbent Manjula Aravind Limbavali
- Party: Bharatiya Janata Party
- Elected year: 2023
- Preceded by: Arvind Limbavali

Mahadevapura Assembly constituency is one of the 224 constituencies in the Karnataka Legislative Assembly of Karnataka, a southern state of India. It is a part of Bangalore Central Lok Sabha constituency. The constituency has been represented by Manjula Aravind Limbavali since the 2023 Karnataka Legislative Assembly election.

As part of the 2025 Indian electoral controversy regarding electoral fraud, Rahul Gandhi - the Leader of the Opposition in Lok Sabha - accused the Election Commission of India (ECI) of adding fraudulent voters in collusion with the ruling Bharatiya Janata Party (BJP) during the 2024 Indian general election in the Mahadevapura part of the Bangalore Central Lok Sabha constituency citing various discrepancies. The Bangalore Central Lok Sabha election was won by BJP's P. C. Mohan. The ECI denied the claims and asked for a formal complaint.

== Members of the Legislative Assembly ==
Election	Member	Party
2008	Aravind Limbavali	Bharatiya Janata Party
2013	Aravind Limbavali	Bharatiya Janata Party
2018	Aravind Limbavali	Bharatiya Janata Party
2023	Manjula Aravind Limbavali	Bharatiya Janata Party

== Election results ==
=== Assembly Election 2023 ===
2023 Karnataka Legislative Assembly election : Mahadevapura
Party	Candidate	Votes	%	±%
BJP	Manjula S	181,731	54.31%	▲4.48
INC	H. Nagesh	137,230	41.01%	▼2.56
NOTA	None of the above	4,775	1.43%	▲0.21
AAP	C. R. Nataraj	4,551	1.36%	New
UPP	Nagaraj. R	2,627	0.79%	New
Margin of victory		44,501	13.30%	▲7.05
Turnout		334,671	55.11%	▼1.23
Total valid votes		334,616		
Registered electors		607,255		▲20.27
BJP hold		Swing	▲4.48	

=== Assembly Election 2018 ===
2018 Karnataka Legislative Assembly election : Mahadevapura
Party	Candidate	Votes	%	±%
BJP	Aravind Limbavali	141,682	49.83%	▼13.26
INC	A. C. Srinivasa	123,898	43.57%	▼16.00
JD(S)	Sathish. K	6,391	2.25%	▼0.96
Independent	Nagesh. T	3,852	1.35%	New
NOTA	None of the above	3,482	1.22%	New
Margin of victory		17,784	6.25%	▲2.73
Turnout		284,474	56.34%	▼5.20
Total valid votes		284,352		
Registered electors		504,890		▲37.01
BJP hold		Swing	▼13.26	

=== Assembly Election 2013 ===
2013 Karnataka Legislative Assembly election : Mahadevapura
Party	Candidate	Votes	%	±%
BJP	Aravind Limbavali	110,244	63.09%	▲10.93
INC	A. C. Srinivasa	104,095	59.57%	▲16.53
JD(S)	N. Govardhan	5,604	3.21%	▲1.77
Independent	R. L. Srinivasa	1,729	0.99%	New
BSRCP	Mayur Patel	1,532	0.88%	New
KJP	Muniyappa. R	1,393	0.80%	New
Margin of victory		6,149	3.52%	▼5.60
Turnout		226,797	61.54%	▲8.37
Total valid votes		174,734		
Registered electors		368,511		▲33.83
BJP hold		Swing	▲10.93	

=== Assembly Election 2008 ===
2008 Karnataka Legislative Assembly election : Mahadevapura
Party	Candidate	Votes	%	±%
BJP	Aravind Limbavali	76,376	52.16%	New
INC	B. Shivanna	63,018	43.04%	New
JD(S)	R. Muniraju	2,107	1.44%	New
BSP	Muniyappa. R	1,274	0.87%	New
Independent	M. Shankar	1,077	0.74%	New
Margin of victory		13,358	9.12%	
Turnout		146,414	53.17%	
Total valid votes		146,414		
Registered electors		275,355		
BJP win (new seat)				

== 2025 Indian electoral controversy ==
The 2025 Indian electoral controversy refers to a series of allegations raised by Rahul Gandhi, the leader of opposition in the Lok Sabha, of electoral fraud and irregularities in the 2024 Indian general election. He alleged that the electoral rolls prepared by the Election Commission of India (ECI) for the Mahadevapura Assembly constituency in Karnataka and 2024 Haryana Legislative Assembly election consisted of various discrepancies, and accused the commission of "vote chori" (vote theft) and indulging in systematic fraud, in collusion with the ruling Bharatiya Janata Party (BJP). The BJP and Bharat Rashtra Samithi laid counter allegations accusing the Congress of "vote theft".

The ECI dismissed the claims and urged him to submit them through a signed declaration. On 17 August, Gyanesh Kumar, the chief election commissioner, added that the allegations must be filed under oath within seven days, failing which they would be deemed “baseless and invalid," citing Rule 20(3)(B) of the Registration of Electors Rules, 1960 and no such affidavit was ever filed by any of the parties involved.

Since then, the opposition parties led by the INC have organised protests and social media campaigns over the ECI's revision of Bihar's electoral rolls. In reaction to the allegation, several members and affiliates of the BJP have defended the commission.

Earlier to the allegation, in July 2025, the opposition Indian National Congress (INC; commonly known simply as "the Congress") had accused the ECI of collusion with the ruling BJP, and of rigging the assembly elections in Madhya Pradesh and Maharashtra.

On 1 August 2025, Rahul Gandhi, the leader of opposition in Lok Sabha, alleged electoral fraud during the 2024 Indian general election. He referred to the evidence as an "atom bomb" and stated that the ruling party will have "no place to hide." On 6 August, the opposition demanded a discussion on the special exercise carried out by the ECI for the revision of electoral rolls in Bihar. Arjun Ram Meghwal, the law minister, asked Rahul Gandhi to present the evidences regarding the fraud and stated that the functioning of the election commission cannot be debated in parliament, citing a previous precedence by Lok Sabha speaker Balram Jakhar.

On 7 August, Rahul Gandhi, in a meeting of the press, alleged that the election commission added fraudulent voters to the electoral roll in the Mahadevapura Assembly constituency in Karnataka, and accused the commission of rigging the 2024 Lok Sabha elections. The Congress lost the election to the Bangalore Central Lok Sabha constituency, of which the assembly segment was part of, by 114,000 votes despite leading in the remaining six assembly segments of the constituency. He stated that the evidences were a result of a six month long research conducted by the party, and challenged the election commission to publish an electronic voter list and CCTV footage to debunk his claims. He raised objection to bulk quantity of duplicate voters and voters with invalid addresses, large number of voters with duplicate addresses, cross-voters between different states and fraudulent form-6 applicants, or new voter registrations bypassing eligibility checks.

On 5 November, 2025 Rahul Gandhi alleged vote fraud in the 2024 Haryana Legislative Assembly election. He claimed theft of over 25 lakh votes in Haryana. He raised objection to bulk quantity of duplicate voters and voters with invalid addresses, large number of voters with duplicate addresses, cross-voters between different states and alleged mass deletion of votes. He presented evidence including repeated use of the same photographic images in voter rolls and cited the case of a Brazilian model's image, which appeared on multiple voter IDs across Haryana.

== See also ==
- Mahadevapura, Bengaluru
- Bangalore Urban district
- List of constituencies of Karnataka Legislative Assembly
- 2026 Indian electoral controversy
- 2026 Bengaluru Freedom Park protests
