= Hoskote =

City in Karnataka, India

Hoskote ಹೊಸಕೋಟೆ
- Taluk
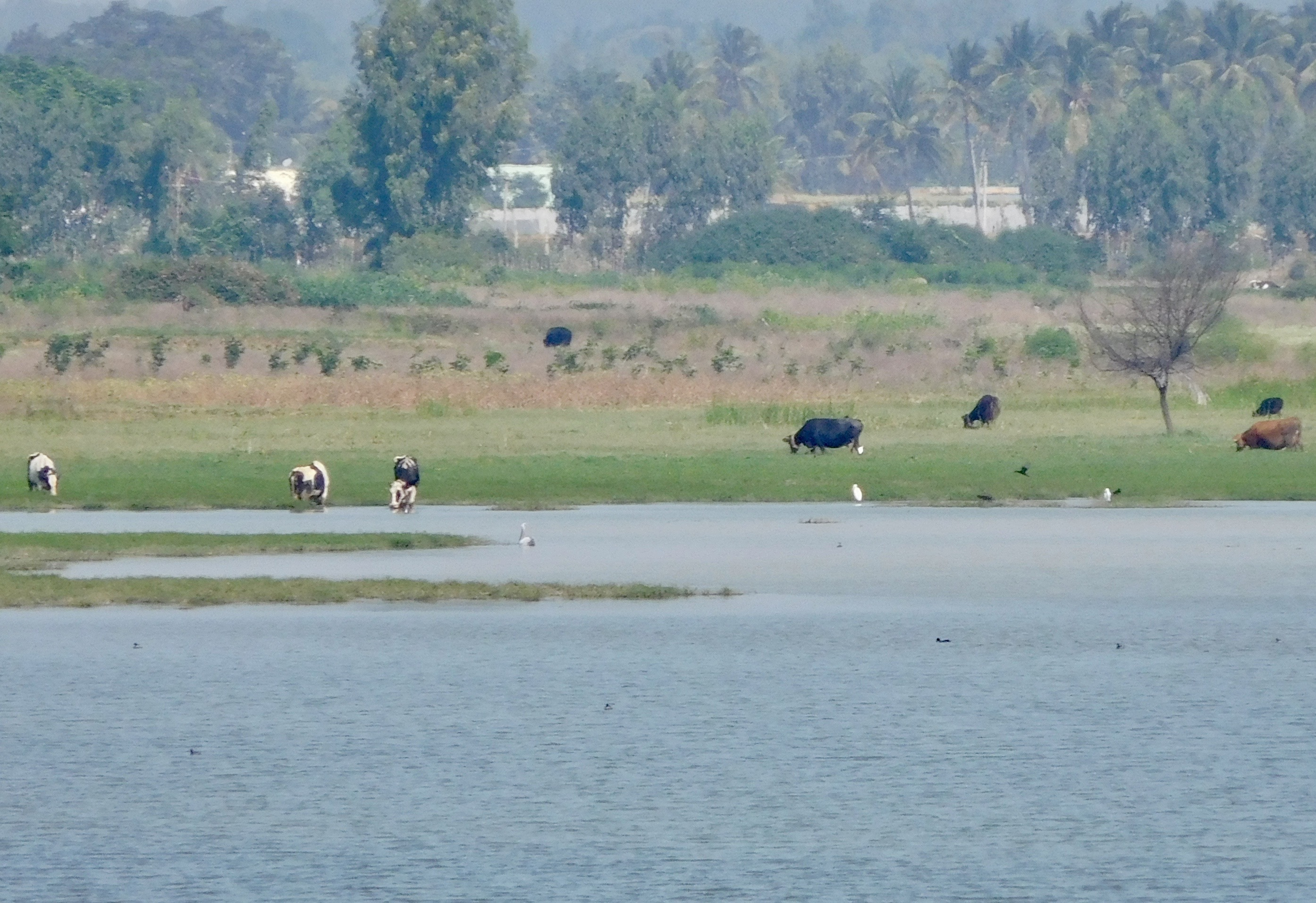
- Hoskote Lake

- Location in Karnataka, India
- Coordinates: 13.07°N 77.8°E
- Country: India
- State: Karnataka
- District: Bengaluru North
- Elevation: 891 m (2,923 ft)

Population (2011)
  - Total: 56,980

Languages
  - Official: Kannada
- Time zone: UTC+5:30 (IST)
- PIN: 562114
- Telephone code: 91-80
- Vehicle registration: KA-53

Hoskote (also known as Hosakote and historically called Ooscata by the British) is a city and satellite city in Bengaluru North District, India. Headquartered at the Hoskote town, it consists of five hoblis - Kasaba, Anugondanahalli, Jadigenahalli, Nandagudi and Sulibele. There are 294 villages in Hoskote taluk, including the five hoblis.

== History ==
Hoskote was a Jagir of Maratha warrior Shahaji Raje for around 50 years and also part of Swarajya of Shivaji. The Battle of Ooscata in the First British-Mysore War, on the night of 22–23 August 1768, took place here.

== Demographics ==
As of 2011 India census, Hoskote had a population of 219000. Males constituted 52% of the population and females 48%. Hoskote had an average literacy rate of 86.22%, higher than the state average of 75.36%: male literacy was 89.58%, and female literacy was 82.68%. 11.98% of the population were under 6 years of age.
