= 2022 Karnataka hijab row =

Dispute over wearing of hijab as part of school uniforms in Karnataka

- Date: February 2022 – 14 May 2026
- Location: Karnataka, India
- Result: Ban upheld by High Court but rescinded by a Congress-led government in 2026

Parties
Muslim students	Educational institutions, Government of Karnataka

Casualties
- Arrested: 2

At the beginning of February 2022, a dispute pertaining to school uniforms was reported in the Indian state of Karnataka, when some Muslim students of a junior college who wanted to wear hijab to classes were denied entry on the grounds that it was a violation of the college's uniform policy which was also followed by the other religion students as well. Over the following weeks, the dispute spread to other schools and colleges across the state, with groups of Hindutva students staging counter-protests by demanding to wear saffron scarves. On 5 February, the Karnataka government issued an order stating that uniforms must be worn compulsorily where policies exist and no exception can be made for the wearing of the hijab. Several educational institutions cited this order and denied entry to Muslim girls wearing the hijab.

Petitions were filed in the Karnataka High Court on behalf of the aggrieved students. On 10 February, the High Court issued an interim order restraining all students from wearing any form of religious attire. The order was implemented in all schools and colleges across Karnataka, with students, and in some cases teachers, being asked to remove hijabs and burqas outside the school gates. After a hearing of about 23 hours spread over 11 days, the court delivered its verdict on 15 March 2022, upholding the restrictions on hijab. The court ruled that the hijab is not an essential religious practice in Islam. Y-category security has been provided to the Karnataka High Court judges who delivered the hijab verdict, and two people were arrested for making threatening speeches. After control of the state legislative assembly changed from the Bharatiya Janata Party (BJP) to the Indian National Congress in the 2023 election, the new state government announced its plans to rescind the order but did not do so until May 2026, when it was replaced with a new order permitting the wearing of "limited traditional and practice-based symbols" where they did not interfere with school uniforms.

The implementation of dress codes by educational institutes, banning the hijab, was criticised inside India and abroad by officials in countries including the United States and Pakistan, by Human Rights Watch, and by figures like Malala Yousafzai. The ban was defended by politicians such as Arif Mohammad Khan, Aaditya Thackeray, Vishva Hindu Parishad and activist Taslima Nasreen.

== Background ==
The education system of Karnataka involves 10 years of school and two years of pre-university college ("PU college"). Using powers conferred under the 'Karnataka Education Act, 1983', Sec. 145(1), the Government of Karnataka empowered recognised educational institutions to decide on uniforms for their students. For school students, uniforms are mandated by the state government and schools can choose the colours. For PU colleges, uniforms were not mandated by the government, but, over time, most college development committees (CDCs) (Note: According to the government's submission to the Karnataka High Court in February 2022, the College Development Committees (CDCs) were constituted in 2014 via an education department circular, with the government approval. The government at that time was held by Indian National Congress led by chief minister Siddaramaiah.) adopted them, according to a PU department official. In 2017, the department issued a direction to all PU colleges saying that PU students should not be asked to wear uniforms. College managements that already had uniforms questioned the direction saying that the students and parents were happy with them. The direction was still found on the PU Education Department website in February 2022, but it does not appear to have been enforced.

Muslims constitute 13 per cent of the population of the state of Karnataka. Muslim women in the state are accessing public education in ever-increasing numbers. Data shows that the Gross Attendance Ratio of Muslim women in higher education rose from about 1 per cent in 2007–08 to a high of about 16 per cent in 2017–18. Many Muslim women consider hijab to be a part of the Islamic faith. In India, the public display of religious symbols is common, including the wearing of hijab and burqa. PEW reports that in Karnataka 71% of Muslim women and 42% of Hindu women cover their heads outside the home (in India, 89% of Muslim women and 59% of Hindu women cover their heads outside the home). Several colleges in Karnataka reported that a small number of Muslim students have "always" worn the hijab in classroom. M Raghupathy, who was Karnataka's education minister in a Janata Party government in the 1980s, said that the government's uniform mandates had allowed both the hijab and the Christian nun's habit. He said that the Bharatiya Janata Party had not objected to the hijab back then.

According to the BBC, the coastal belt of Karnataka has seen protests over hijab in the past but such issues were often quickly resolved. Not all cases were easy, however. A second-year PU student at Moodabidri was disallowed from attending classes for an entire year in 2011–12 due to her insistence on wearing a hijab. There have also been instances of Hindu students protesting with saffron scarves (Note: Saffron is a holy colour in Hinduism, but there is no religious requirement to wear it in scarves. More significantly, the saffron colour is promoted by the Hindu nationalist organisations such as the Vishva Hindu Parishad as an emblem of their ideology.) to oppose Muslim students being allowed with hijab or burqa in classes. The Muslim women were said to have been anxious that their parents would not allow them to go to college without their religious clothing.

The coastal districts of Dakshina Kannada and Udupi have seen sectarian polarisation over the decades with the rise of Hindu nationalism, represented by organisations like Bajrang Dal, Hindu Jagarana Vedike, Vishva Hindu Parishad (VHP) and Akhila Bharatiya Vidyarthi Parishad (ABVP), and a parallel mobilisation of the Muslim community by the Popular Front of India (PFI) and its affiliates Campus Front of India (CFI) and the Social Democratic Party of India. The PFI, CFI and seven other associated outfits were banned by the Government of India for unlawful activities in September 2022.

From 2019 to 2023, Karnataka had been governed by the Hindu nationalist Bharatiya Janata Party (BJP). It had adopted popular Hindu nationalist policies such as banning cow slaughter and passing an "anti-conversion bill" which prohibits conversion from one religion to another by misrepresentation, force, fraud, allurement or marriage. Because the bill prohibits conversion for the sake of marriage, critics fear that the bill makes it difficult for interfaith couples to marry (Note: Interfaith couples who wish to marry without converting to either religion can do so under the Special Marriage Act, 1954.) or for individuals to convert to Christianity or Islam.

== Events ==
=== Udupi dispute ===
In early January 2022, a dispute over the wearing of the hijab was reported at a government-run Pre-University College for Girls at Udupi that had disallowed the wearing of hijab as being in violation of its uniform policy. Six Muslim female students insisted on wearing hijab to classes on top of their college uniform, arguing that hijab was part of their faith, and their constitutional right. The college said its uniform policy did not allow for the hijab. The girls offered to use the existing uniform's dupatta to cover their head, arguing they didn't need to wear a separate hijab of a different colour or material, but the college refused. The college allowed them to wear the hijab on campus, but did not allow them into classes. They were found sitting in corridors and working with their notebooks.

The case was brought to the attention of the media by Ansar Ahmed, the district president of Karnataka Rakshana Vedike, a voluntary organisation. Campus Front of India (CFI), the student wing of the radical Islamic organisation Popular Front of India (PFI), threatened a protest, prompting the college to arrange a police presence. The political wing of the PFI, the Social Democratic Party of India (SDPI), is also said to have threatened protests. The college authorities met and talked with the parents but remained firm in their resolution not to allow religious attire.

What caused the students' change of mind on the hijab issue is uncertain. They admit to having attended the first year of class as per the college's no-hijab policy. They went to campus in burqas and removed them in a "ladies' room" before going to classes. One of the students also said that the parents were told about this when they joined the college in 2020. Others were doubtful. When the classes moved online due to Covid, the issue died down. With the on-campus classes resuming in September 2021, some of the students asked for permission to wear the hijab, which was denied on the grounds that everyone must wear a "common uniform". In October 2021, two of them took part in an anti-rape protest and a photograph of the event was circulated. This brought their situation into focus to their parents as well as the CFI. (Note: The anti-rape protest was organised by the ABVP, photographs of which were circulated on social media. Some parents and CFI members took offence at the students' participation in an ABVP lead protest. The lack of headscarves in the images circulated brought the situation into focus for their parents as well as the CFI.) An investigation by the Udupi Police reported that CFI had approached the parents and offered help to challenge the college management. According to one of the students, the agreement "mentioned a compulsory uniform and said nothing about a hijab". So, the six students and their parents decided to insist upon hijab. (Note: According to The Hindu, 12 students initially demanded to be allowed to wear hijab, but six of them later agreed to the college policy, while six students continued to protest.)

According to the federated Muslim organisation Muslim Okkoota (Note: Muslim Okkoota, also spelt Muslim Okkutta, is a federation of six Muslim organisations that includes Jamaat-e-Islami Hind, PFI, Tablighi Jamaat and others. It organisational secretary at the time of the incidents was Abdul Azeez Udyawar, who was also the district president of the Welfare Party of India, an affiliate of Jamaat-e-Islami Hind.) that is active in the district, PFI and its allied organisations used the students "for their benefit". The students' hijab protest seemed to be a ploy for the political wing (SDPI) to strengthen its support base. Some of the protesting parents and relatives are active members of SDPI and other PFI affiliates. The SDPI had just won six seats in the local body elections, which was termed a major triumph. Muslim Okkoota claims to have tried to resolve the dispute locally by talking to the college authorities, the parents and the CFI, but the CFI chose to publicise the issue by circulating photographs of students stranded outside classes, provoking the college and the BJP leaders to harden their stand. By the end of December, "nobody was in the mood for a compromise".

The college development committee, which is responsible for setting the uniform policy, was headed by K. Raghupati Bhat, an MLA belonging to the ruling BJP. Its 21 members did not include any Muslims. After the dispute erupted, Bhat held a meeting with parents of all students on 1 January and declared that the college would continue with its uniform code, which does not allow for hijab. The CFI and SDPI took the position that, since uniforms were not mandated by the government, they could not violate the students' religious rights. Bhat wrote to the Pre-University Education Department of the state government to clarify the matter. Thus, the matter was escalated to the state government level.

=== Saffron protests ===
Soon after the Udupi episode became public, groups of Hindu students started coming to their colleges wearing saffron scarves to protest against Muslim students being allowed with hijabs. A leader of the Hindu Jagarana Vedike, an affiliate of the Sangh Parivar, declared, "if girls are allowed to wear hijab then other students will come with saffron shawls to institutions across Dakshina Kannada and Udupi districts."

A co-educational first-grade college in Koppa tehsil in the Chikmagalur district, was the first to witness this development when some students wore saffron scarves and demanded that the dress code be enforced. The college asked the Muslim students to remove hijab in classrooms to deflect the crisis. The matter was resolved a few days later at a parent-teacher meeting where it was decided to allow Muslim girls to wear the hijab as long as they did not pin the headcover or tie them around their head. The parents of the Hindu students did not support their wards' demand to don saffron scarves. On 6 January, Hindu students at Pompei College in Mangalore wore saffron shawls to protest against the hijab, and were supported by the Hindu nationalist organizations ABVP, VHP and Bajrang Dal.

The saffron protests gained momentum in February, being seen at the Governrment PU college in Kundapura (2 February), Bhandarkars' Arts & Science College in the same town (3 February), and Dr BB Hegde College near Udupi (3 February). At the last location, the saffron protesters successfully blocked the hijab-wearing Muslim students from entering the college.

=== Government reaction ===
The ministers of Bharatiya Janata Party-led Karnataka government reacted to the incidents with apparent distaste. The education minister B. C. Nagesh termed it as an "act of indiscipline". The students could not practise their "religion" in public educational institutions, in his view. The uniform had been present for over three decades and there had been no problem with it till this point, he said. He blamed "political leaders", an apparent reference to the PFI, for provoking the students, who were allegedly "playing politics". Home Minister Araga Jnanendra said that there must be a universal feeling in schools and colleges that "we are all Indians", which required that the uniform code set by colleges be followed.

On 27 January, the government announced the setting up of an expert committee to study the issue. Until its decision was made, the government urged the students to maintain the "status quo". For the Udupi PU College students, the "status quo" apparently meant that they should "adhere to the uniform rule". The government issued an order to this effect. The CDC chairman Raghupati Bhat called a meeting with parents and told them that the students should remove the hijab in the classroom.

On either 3 February or 4 February, (Note: The order did not come into public view till 5 February, but the institutions citing the order were already implementing it on Thursday, 3 February and Friday, 4 February.) the government issued an order stating that the uniforms mandated by the state government, the school managements or college development committees must be worn compulsorily. Students following religious tenents adversely impacted "equality and unity" in colleges, according to the order. The preamble stated that a ban on hijab was not illegal, and cited three court orders from Kerala, Bombay and Madras High Courts. For those colleges where the college development committees did not mandate a uniform, the students must still wear attire that maintains "equality and unity and doesn't hamper public order". The education minister B. C. Nagesh made a statement declaring, "those who want to defy the government's school uniform regulations cannot enter their schools and attend classes".

=== Fallout ===
The impact of the government order was instantaneous. Even before the order became public, the knowledge about it reached the coastal districts by 3 February and started getting implemented. Even colleges that had customarily allowed hijab in classes now felt compelled to disallow them. In many cases, Hindu students forced the issue by insisting that if the hijab was allowed in classes, they should also be allowed to wear saffron scarves.

In Kundapura, 28 students wearing hijab were barred from entering the Government PU College premises on 3 February. Hindu students had apparently come in saffron scarves the previous day, and the minister B. C. Nagesh informed the college that students could come to classes in only uniforms and neither hijab nor saffron scarves would be allowed. The students were very anxious because their public exams were just two months away. The Telegraph commented that their "tearful pleas fell on deaf ears". At Bhandarkars' Arts & Science College, a private college in Kundapura, 40 students were barred from entering the premises the following day. The students pointed to the college rulebook, which permitted the wearing of the hijab. Some of the students said their college's treatment was "humiliating". At the Dr BB Hegde College, where the hijab-wearing students were blocked by saffron protesters the previous day, the college administration banned the hijab on 4 February, citing the government order. The students had apparently been wearing hijab for three years at the school without issue. On 8 February, Mahatma Gandhi Memorial College prevented students in hijab from entering, even though multiple students said the college had not objected to her hijab in the past.

The dispute then began to spread to other institutions across Karnataka, between Muslim students who wanted to wear hijab and the administrations barring them. The controversy intensified in early February 2022. Between 4 and 7 February, counter-protests led by students who were against allowing students wearing the hijab to enter the college. These students marched to the college wearing saffron shawls. However, authorities stopped them from entering the premises and asked the students to remove the shawls. The students were allowed in only after they complied with the request. (Note: Sources for students were allowed in only after they removed hijab:) On 7 February, some students wore blue shawls and chanted Jai Bhim at a college in Chikmagalur in support of Muslim girls in hijab (as opposed to the saffron shawls that were against the wearing of hijab).

On 8 February, the Government of Karnataka announced the closure of high schools and colleges for three days, after the controversy over the wearing of hijab by Muslim students intensified. The Bangalore Police prohibited protests and agitations from 9 February until 22 February within the vicinity of any educational institution. Two Muslim men were arrested for allegedly carrying lethal weapons during a protest that was being held near a college in Udipi district. According to police officials, three others managed to flee.

On 10 February, a lone Muslim woman, named Muskan Khan, clad in a burqa was heckled on her college grounds in Mandya by a crowd of male Hindu students wearing saffron shawls and chanting "Jai Shri Ram". She responded back shouting "Allahu Akbar", while the college staff controlled the crowd and escorted her into the building. A video of the incident went viral. The treatment of Muskan Khan was condemned by many notable figures, including by actors John Cusack, Pooja Bhatt, Fakhre Alam, and footballer Paul Pogba.

== Petitions in the High Court ==
Several students from the Udupi PU college filed a writ petition in the Karnataka High Court on 31 January. The petition sought the wearing of hijab to be recognised as a fundamental right under Article 14 and Article 25 of the Indian constitution as it is an essential Islamic practice. The Campus Front of India said it provided them legal advice. The petition also argued that singling out the petitioner solely on the basis of wearing hijab is against "constitutional morality". The petition was argued by senior advocate Ravivarma Kumar and other lawyers.

A second petition was filed by a student from Kundapura (referred to as "Smt Rasham") around 4 February, seeking a directive to permit Muslim students to wear hijab to classes. The petitioner was represented by senior advocate Davadatt Kamat. Two students from the Bhandarkar's arts and science college in Kundapura also filed a petition, who were represented by senior advocate Yusuf Muchhala.

Hearings began on 8 February, with Justice Krishna S. Dixit presiding. After hearing the initial arguments, the judge concluded that the chief issue was whether wearing hijab is an essential religious practice, and, if it is so, why the state should interfere in the matter. The judge decided that, given its public importance, the case should be heard by a "full bench" (consisting of three judges). A full bench consisting of the Chief Justice Ritu Raj Awasthi, Justice Dixit and Justice Khazi Jaibunnisa Mohiuddin was constituted the next day. By this stage, there were said to be five petitions representing 18 students in front of the court. Hearings resumed on 10 February.

The three-judge bench passed an interim order on 11 February. It requested the State to re-open the educational institutions and restrained students from wearing any sort of religious clothes in classrooms until the court decided the matter. Following the order few people from a Muslim organization Tamil Nadu Thowheed Jamaat threatened the judges citing an incidence of Dhanbad judge who died in accident. The accused were arrested and the judges were given Y category security.

=== Religious rights ===
During the hearings on 14–15 February (Days 3 and 4), the students' lawyer, Senior Advocate Devadatt Kamat argued that the Muslim women's right to wear the hijab is protected by the Article 25(1) of the Indian Constitution, which guarantees freedom of conscience and the right to practise one's religion. He asserted that wearing the hijab is an 'essential religious practice' as per Islamic scriptures including the Quran. These rights are subject only to concerns regarding public order, morality and health. He argued that for a practice to violate public order, it must be 'abhorrent by itself' and must cause 'disturbance to society'. Wearing the hijab is neither of such and so does not violate public order. When the bench questioned whether every verse of Quran should be treated as an Essential Religious Practice, Adv. Kamat replied that this isn't the matter in front of the court and hence should not appear for consideration before the court. Senior advocate Ravivarma Kumar also claimed that, by choosing to ban the hijab, the government was selectively targeting Muslim students. This amounted to religious discrimination as per Article 15(1) of the Indian constitution. He argued that the goal of education was to promote plurality, not uniformity, and the classroom should be a reflection of the diversity in society.

The Advocate general (AG) of the state, Prabhuling Navadgi, on 21–22 February (Days 8 and 9), challenged the petitioners by stating that only 'essential religious practices' are protected by Article 25. He claimed that the petitioners failed to prove that wearing of hijab is an essential practice. Further, by claiming it to be an essential practice, they were trying to bind every Muslim woman to the dress code consisting of hijab. Citing the Supreme Court decision in the Ismail Farooqui case, the AG asserted that an essential religious practice must be obligatory. Optional practices do not fall under the ambit of essential religious practices and do not merit constitutional protection. The AG asserted that the petitioners' claim to protection under Article 19(1) of the Indian constitution (right to freedom of expression) and the claim under Article 25(1) are "mutually destructive" (contradictory). The AG and other lawyers representing the state, CDC, MLA, teachers etc., backed these assertions by stating that the right to freedom of expression is 'forum internum' and applied to inner convictions and inner thoughts, while the right to practice religion is 'forum externum' and applies to the outwardly expression/manifestation of one's faith or practice. They also stated that these rights are subject to reasonable restrictions.

=== Government order ===
Devadatt Kamat assailed the Government Order of February 2022 during the Day 3 hearing. He stated that the order relied on three former High Court judgements to argue in favour of dress codes, but none of them applied to the present case. Senior Advocate Yusuf Mucchala, appearing on behalf of a Muslim student, stated that the Government Order was "manifestly arbitrary". It violated the Article 14 of the Indian constitution as well as the principle of fairness since the Muslim students were not allowed to be heard. Barring students from wearing hijab due to objections from other students was blatantly partisan.

The Advocate General of the state defended the Government Order by stating that it did not in fact ban hijab, it was merely a "suggestion". After the resistance from the Muslim students at the Udupi PU College, its college development committee referred the issue to the states PU Department. The government formed a "high-level committee" to study the issue and issued the order, giving autonomy to college development committees to prescribe uniforms. The order itself did not prescribe uniforms and was, therefore "innocuous". It neither prescribed nor proscribed the hijab. Upon query from the Chief Justice as to why the order mentioned hijab at all, the AG responded that it was merely an "indication" to the college authorities. The CJ probed further by asking the AG whether the government would have any objections to the hijab being worn in classrooms if they are permitted by the college. The AG replied that the state would be okay with it and that it would only intervene if grievances were raised under section 131 of the Karnataka Education Act.

In his rejoinder, Devadatt Kamat alleged that the AG had given up ninety per cent of the Government Order in his arguments, thus effectively rendering the order inoperative, and that consequently, there was no need for further discussion on whether the wearing of the hijab was an essential religious practice.

=== College development committees ===
During the hearing on 16 February (Day 5), the senior advocate of the petitioners, Ravivarma Kumar, challenged the legality of the college development committees, which are said to have been empowered to decide on uniforms. He claimed that the CDCs were not recognised by either the Karnataka Education Act or the Rules issued under it. He also questioned the propriety of the CDCs being chaired by MLAs, who are subject to a political party and ideology. He contended that MLAs (legislators) could not be given executive functions.

The Advocate General of the state responded to the criticisms during the hearing on 18 February (Day 7). He said that CDC consisted of the local MLA as the President, a person appointed by them as the vice-president, and representatives of parents and students as well as the college principal and the lecturers' representatives. He said that the CDCs were constituted under directions given by the state government per section 133(2) of the Karnataka Education Act. He also contended that MLAs could perform executive functions under the Westminster form of governance.

=== Udupi college and other institutions ===
The Advocate General of the state stated in the Day 7 hearing that the Udupi PU College had a dress code prescribed in 2013, and uniform had been the norm at the institution since its founding in 1985. Senior Advocate S. Naganand, arguing for the PU college, asserted that the college had decided in 2004 to make uniforms compulsory. The government had left it to the colleges to decide uniforms and there was no problem with them for 20 years. Naganand claimed that the wearing of the hijab was a "cultural" practice, not a religious practice. He stressed that educational institutions had the power to impose dress codes to maintain discipline and that they were exercising "parental powers" in doing so. He said that a parent delegates their parental responsibility to the teacher or the institution when they send their child there (In loco parentis).

The advocate for the teachers of the Government PU College, R. Venkataramani, argued that the practice of wearing hijab violates 'public order' under Article 25(1), and when a religious practice violates the restrictions under Article 25(1) (public order, morality and health), checking if a practice is essential is not necessary, since the question of essentiality applies only when interpreting Article 25(2). Senior Advocate Sajan Poovayya, appearing on behalf of educational institutions, cited the Article 28 of the Indian constitution to assert that education was a secular activity and no religious instruction was to be provided in schools. Even if the wearing of the hijab was an essential religious practice, authorities must ensure that no religious symbols be allowed into schools.

== High Court verdict ==
The Karnataka High Court upheld the ban on hijab by the educational institutes on 15 March 2022. The court ruled that hijab is not an essential religious practice under Islam and, hence, is not protected by the Article 25 of the Constitution setting out the fundamental right to practice one's religion.

The High Court carried out its own investigation by consulting The Holy Quran: Text, Translation and Commentary by Abdullah Yusuf Ali, which was previously used by the Supreme Court of India in the Shayara Bano case. Ali's commentary held that the Quran recommended hijab only to address the cases of "molestation of innocent women" during the time of Jahiliya (times of pre-Islamic "ignorance" prior to Islam) as a measure of social security; it was not a religious practice and much less essential to the Islamic faith. Y-category security has been provided to the Karnataka High Court judges who delivered the hijab verdict and two people were arrested for threat speeches.

== Supreme Court ==
The Supreme Court of India rejected the petitions demanding an urgent hearing of the case. Advocates requested the court to urgently hear the case so that the girls can appear in the school exams to prevent the loss progress made over the previous year. These requests were rejected by the Chief Justice of India, N. V. Ramana, who stated that the exams had nothing to do with this matter and this issue must not be sensationalized. On 26 April, CJI Ramana assured that the pleas challenging the verdict of the High Court would be listed for hearing in the Supreme Court.

A two-judge panel returned a split decision in October: one judge, Hemant Gupta, upheld the Karnataka High Court ruling, while the other, Sudhanshu Dhulia, found it had ruled in error. The judges requested the Chief Justice to refer the matter to a larger bench.

== Violence ==
Parallel to the protests, there have been several instances of violence. Allegedly, these were a result of the victims' social media posts against allowing the hijab in colleges. Dilip, a shopkeeper in Davanagere, was attacked by a mob who dragged him out of his shop where he was attacked and stabbed. A man Naveen and his mother Sarojamma were also attacked in the village of Nallur, by an angry mob of around 300 masked people bearing deadly weapons. Both were alleged by the victims families to be a result of posting an anti hijab status on WhatsApp.

On 21 February, a Bajrang Dal member who took part in the anti-hijab protests of Hindu students was found murdered in the Shivamogga district. According to the police, the incident may have been a result of his prior involvement in at least five assault cases and attempt to murder that had religious overtones. Investigations are ongoing. The Home Minister said that no connection had yet been found between the protests and the murder. A fatwa was issued against him earlier in 2015 by a Facebook group named ‘Mangalore Muslims’. Stones were pelted at his funeral procession, which injured 3 people when the procession reached Siddiah Road. A photojournalist, two bystanders and a policeman were also injured. Some vehicles were also set on fire, and more than 20 were damaged. The crowd retaliated torching vehicles, tyres, stoned many commercial establishments and houses belonging to the Muslim community. Local journalists claimed that they were attacked and their cameras damaged by the mob. 3 arrests were made out of the suspected 5 involved in the murder.

Sections of the Unlawful Activities (Prevention) Act were invoked by the police, and the National Investigation Agency (NIA) Field Officer Sh. Anand Jha was investigating the case after his transfer, which had been assigned to senior officials.

Hazra Shifa, one of the petitioners in the Karnataka High Court, alleged that her brother Saif was beaten up by a group of intoxicated people, who opposed the statements made by their father to a local news channel in support of the hijab. In her social media post, she alleged that the attackers were "Sangh Parivar goons".

== Reactions ==
=== Domestic ===
- Apoorvanand, a professor of Hindi at the University of Delhi, called the controversy a part of a larger project in which "Muslim identity markers are being declared as sectarian and undesirable in public spaces", noting that "it is telling Muslims and non-Hindus that the state will dictate their appearance and their practices".
- Opposition leader and former CM of Karnataka, Siddaramaiah said, "No one has a problem if students apply ‘sindhoor,’ nor is anyone affected if students wear hijab. These are traditions that are being followed for years". "Following ancient culture and belief does not create problem to anyone. While people had been wearing hijab for a long time, people were not wearing saffron shawl. It shows the narrow mentality of people who are wearing saffron shawl just to oppose hijab."
- Rahul Gandhi, the leader of the opposition Indian National Congress party, criticized the government and said "By letting students' hijab come in the way of their education, we are robbing the future of the daughters of India. Prohibiting hijab-wearing students from entering school is a violation of fundamental rights."
- Aaditya Thackeray, state minister of Maharashtra, told journalists, "If there is a uniform at schools, there should not be a place for any other dress other than that. Schools and colleges are the Centres of education, only education should be imparted there."
- Muslim Rashtriya Manch (MRM), the Muslim wing of the Rashtriya Swayamsevak Sangh (RSS):
  - In a statement, Anil Singh, the Prant Sanchalak (Awadh) of the MRM backed the burqa-clad student who was heckled by youth shouting 'Jai Shri Ram' slogans at a Karnataka college, saying ‘purdah’ is part of Indian culture.
  - The MRM distanced itself from Singh's statement and said that it does not support such "fanaticism and religious frenzy" and supported the enforcement of dress code in educational institutions in Karnataka.
- Vishva Hindu Parishad - Surendra Jain, joint secretary of Vishwa Hindu Parishad termed the hijab row "a conspiracy to propagate jihadi terrorism" and said that Muslim students were attempting "hijab jihad" on college campuses.
- Education ministers in BJP ruled Himachal Pradesh and Tripura said their governments currently had no plans for a uniform dress code.
- Education ministers of Maharashtra and West Bengal, both states ruled by opposition parties, accused the BJP of "politicising" the school uniform. West Bengal education minister promised his state would "never" implement a hijab ban. Maharashtra education minister maintained the Indian Constitution gave freedom of religion. Rajasthan Education Minister Bulaki Das Kalla said his state doesn't restrict the hijab and accused the BJP of "mak[ing] issues out of non-issues".
- Sonam Kapoor – She shared an Instagram picture of a man in a turban and a woman in a hijab, and it questions why can a turban be a choice but a hijab can't.
- Arif Mohammad Khan, a BJP leader and governor of the state of Kerala, stated that Islam has only five essential practices of Islam, and that hijab wasn't one of them and thus Article 25 of the Indian constitution didn't apply to the hijab as the article covers only essential, intrinsic and integral practices. He also added that following the ban on triple talaq, Muslim women are "having a sense of freedom" and are "pursuing education" and "joining great career" and that the ongoing row is "not a controversy but a conspiracy" and a "sinister design" to push back Muslim women, especially young girls.
- Kerala CM Pinarayi Vijayan condemned the hijab row in Karnataka, stating "This shows how dangerous communalism is for our country. Educational institutions should be places to nurture secularism. Instead, efforts are made to inject communal venom in young children." He tweeted a picture of schoolgirls in Kerala wearing hijabs.
- Kamal Haasan stated, "What's happening in Karnataka shouldn't be allowed in Tamil Nadu."
- Citizen group Bahutva Karnataka alleged that the violence related to the Hijab controversy was perpetrated by members of Hindutva organisations associated with the RSS and that these organisations coaxed, exhorted and threatened youth. They also claimed that the statewide incidents of anti-hijab protests in colleges appeared to be coordinated. They stated that they came to these conclusions after visiting the spots where religious violence had occurred.
- Congress leader Mukarram Khan gave a statement that those who opposed the hijab would be chopped into pieces. A FIR was lodged against him on 16 February but he went into hiding. He was arrested in Hyderabad but had to be admitted in a hospital for health issues.
- Journalist and author Rana Ayyub in an interview with the BBC allegedly referred to the hijab counter-protesters as "hindu terrorists" . A FIR was lodged against her under section 295 of IPC (insult to religion with malicious intent).
- Miss Universe 2021 Harnaaz Sandhu said "Let them live the way they choose to. I think I just gave my perspective to it. And at the end of the day, that girl is dominated by the patriarchy system or if that girl is wearing a hijab, that's her choice. Even if she's getting dominated, she needs to come and speak." Until she doesn't support herself, how can I support her? And if that's her choice, then that's her choice. Let her live the way she wants to live. We are women of all colours, we are women of different cultures, we need to respect each other... I think we all have different lives, so why do you want to pressurise and dominate somebody else?

=== International ===
- The United States Ambassador-at-Large for International Religious Freedom, Rashad Hussain described the hijab ban as a violation of freedom of religion.
- The National Assembly of Bahrain condemned the hijab ban imposed in educational institutions in an Indian state.
- Kuwaiti MPs joined international criticism of hijab row; demanding for Kuwait to ban BJP leaders from entering the country.
- (Pakistan) Pakistani Foreign Minister Shah Mahmood Qureshi accused India of denying Muslim girls their right to education. According to the Economic Times, he claimed that India is depriving Indian Muslim girls of an education just because they want to attend their classes in religious headgear.
- (Afghanistan) Taliban spokesman Inamullah Samangani praised the college girls for wearing hijab and defending their religious values.
- Human Rights Watch criticized the ban as a violation of the right to education without discrimination.
- Malala Yousafzai tweeted that it is terrible to prevent girls wearing hijab from entering school. She said that there were still objections against women in the matter of dressing more or less and demanded that Indian leaders should stop the process of separating Muslim women from the mainstream.
- Taslima Nasrin supported the implementation of a secular dress code in schools and colleges, and added that "hijab or niqab or burqa are symbols of oppression".
- Rezaul Karim, president of Islami Andolan Bangladesh, said that banning the hijab in educational institutions in Karnataka is a violation of religious and civil rights.
- The Organisation of Islamic Cooperation voiced 'deep concern' over the hijab ban.

=== Ministry of External Affairs ===
- Reacting to comments by some countries, including the United States, on the controversy, the MEA's spokesperson said that the matter "is under judicial examination" and that the issue will be resolved according to "constitutional framework and mechanisms" and "democratic ethos and polity". He stated that "motivated comments" on India's internal issues "are not welcome".
- Reacting to the statement by the General Secretariat of the OIC, the MEA's spokesperson termed the statement "motivated and misleading" and the OIC Secretariat's mindset "communal". He also said that the "OIC continues to be hijacked by vested interests to further their nefarious propaganda against India. As a result, it has only harmed its own reputation."

== Impact ==
After the High Court verdict which upheld the hijab ban in government schools, many women students were either turned away or did not appear for the class 10th and 12th board exams.

In August 2022, six months after the order banning hijab from government colleges, an RTI response revealed that 145 of 900 (16%) female Muslim students from government and aided colleges in Dakshina Kannada and Udupi districts, which were at the centre of the hijab controversy, took transfer certificates. Some of these students took admission in a college where hijab was allowed, while others did not take admission anywhere due to inability to pay the college fees. The number of transfer certificates were higher in government colleges (34%) in comparison to aided colleges (8%).

A study published by human rights body People’s Union for Civil Liberties reported that the move to ban hijab has widened the social divide and increased fear among Muslims in Karnataka.

== Rescission ==
In 2023, the Indian National Congress became the majority party after elections for the Karnataka Legislative Assembly. Chief Minister Siddaramaiah promised to lift the hijab ban, but this had not occurred by December, when Siddaramaiah had said such was only being "contemplated". On 13 May 2026, three weeks after a college in Koramangala asked students taking an exam to remove their janivara, the order was replaced with a new one permitting students to wear prescribed uniforms along with “limited traditional and practice-based symbols" where these do not conflict with the uniform or interfere with the educational environment.

== See also ==
- School uniform § Controversies
- Dress code § Dress code backlash
- Women in Islam

== Bibliography ==
- Sood, Anusha Ravi (11 February 2022). "Viral photos, bruised egos, radical student groups: Inside story of Karnataka's hijab crisis". ThePrint.
- Sayeed, Vikhar Ahmed (11 March 2022). "Tearing the social fabric". Frontline.
