= Vatal =

Vatal may refer to:

- Vatal Nagaraj Indian politician
- Kannada Chalavali Vatal Paksha Indian state political party
