= B. Z. Zameer Ahmed Khan =

Indian politician

Cabinet Minister Government of Karnataka
- Incumbent
- Assumed office 3 August 2026
- Governor: Thawar Chand Gehlot
- Cabinet: Shivakumar ministry
- Chief Minister: D. K. Shivakumar
- Ministry and Departments: Housing
- In office 20 May 2023 – 29 May 2026
- Governor: Thawar Chand Gehlot
- Cabinet: Second Siddaramaiah ministry
- Chief Minister: Siddaramaiah
- Ministry and Departments: Housing; Waqf; Minority Welfare
- Preceded by: Shashikala Annasaheb Jolle (Waqf & Minority Welfare); V. Somanna (Housing)
- Succeeded by: U. T. Khader (Waqf & Minority Welfare)
- In office 6 June 2018 – 22 July 2019
- Governor: Vajubhai Vala
- Cabinet: Second Kumaraswamy ministry
- Chief Minister: H. D. Kumaraswamy
- Ministry and Departments: Food & civil supplies; Minority welfare
- Preceded by: U. T. Khader; Tanveer Sait
- Succeeded by: Shashikala Annasaheb Jolle; Prabhu Chauhan
- In office 29 June 2006 – 8 October 2007
- Governor: T. N. Chaturvedi
- Cabinet: First Kumaraswamy ministry
- Chief Minister: H. D. Kumaraswamy
- Ministry and Departments: Haj; Waqf
- Preceded by: Iqbal Ansari
- Succeeded by: Mumtaz Ali Khan

Member of the Karnataka Legislative Assembly
- Incumbent
- Assumed office 2005
- Preceded by: S. M. Krishna
- Constituency: Chamrajpet

Personal details
- Born: 1 August 1966 (age 60) Kunigal, Tumkur, Karnataka, India
- Party: Indian National Congress (2018–Present)
- Other political affiliations: Janata Dal (Secular) (2005–2018)
- Parent: Ziaulla Khan
- Occupation: Travel Company Head

Zameer Ahmed Khan (born 1 August 1966) is an Indian politician serving as the cabinet minister in the Government of Karnataka. He is a 5 time MLA of Chamrajpet Constituency. He has been listed as one of the 100 most influential Muslims 2025 by renowned English portal Muslim Mirror

== Early life ==
BP Basheer Ahmed Khan founded National Travels. After his death in the early 1950s, his eldest son B Ataulla Khan took charge of the company followed by his brothers namely: B Ziaulla, B Sanaulla, B Anwarulla, B Rahmathulla, B Noorulla, and B Sirajulla. They were succeeded by a third generation, led by B Ataulla Khan and his brothers.

== Career ==
He is a member of the Legislative Assembly, Cabinet Minister Govt. Of Karnataka and former General Secretary of the Karnataka Pradesh Janata Dal (Secular). Khan was the former Minister for the Hajj and Wakf Board for government of Karnataka.

In 2005, S. M. Krishna was appointed Maharashtra governor, which paved the way for Zameer's political growth. When Krishna vacated Chamarajpet's seat to take up the governor's post, JD(S) fielded Zameer who beat Krishna's lieutenant R. V. Devraj. Subsequently, Zameer was sworn in as Haj and Wakf minister in the JDS-BJP coalition government under H D Kumaraswamy. On 25 March 2018, Zameer along with 6 other MLA's of the JD(S) party officially joined Indian National Congress.

== Position held ==
#	From	To	Position	Party
1.	2005 (By-election)	2008	MLA (1st term) from Chamrajpet	JD(S)
2.	2008	2013	MLA (2nd term) from Chamrajpet	JD(S)
3.	2013	2018	MLA (3rd term) from Chamrajpet	JD(S)
4.	2018	2023	MLA (4th term) from Chamrajpet	INC
5.	2023	Present	MLA (5th term) from Chamrajpet	INC

== Controversies ==
=== Davanagere South bypoll sabotage row (2026) ===
In April 2026, Khan became embroiled in a major intra-party controversy centered on the Davanagere South by-election. Khan had reportedly assured that a Muslim candidate would be fielded for the seat and projected himself as a key decision-maker for minority representation; when the ticket was ultimately denied to a Muslim aspirant, dissatisfaction mounted among the party's Muslim leadership. Khan remained largely absent from the constituency during the campaign, citing responsibilities related to elections in Kerala; he eventually made a brief visit to Davanagere at the insistence of Chief Minister Siddaramaiah and Deputy Chief Minister D. K. Shivakumar.

A day after polling on 9 April, a group of senior Congress Muslim leaders including Karnataka Legislative Council Chief Whip Saleem Ahmed, Shivajinagar MLA Rizwan Arshad, Shiggaon MLA Yasir Ahmed Khan Pathan, Legislative Assembly MLC Bilkis Bano, and others held a joint press conference at the KPCC Congress Bhavana office in Queens Road, Bengaluru, alleging a "conspiracy" by unnamed senior party leaders to defeat the official Congress candidate Samarth Shamanur Mallikarjun in the constituency. Though the leaders stopped short of naming individuals, several party sources identified Khan as among those being accused. Complaints were also reportedly escalated to AICC General Secretary Randeep Singh Surjewala.

On 1 June 2026, an audio clip purportedly featuring Khan urging Muslim voters to back the SDPI and independent candidates over the official Congress nominee went viral on social media. The authenticity of the clip was not independently verified, and Khan had not publicly responded at the time of the clip's circulation; the Congress party reportedly initiated an internal inquiry into the matter.

At least one report by AICC Karnataka in-charge Abhishek Dutt and a separate state intelligence report pointed to the alleged role of several Congress Muslim leaders, including Khan, in funding rebel candidates to split the Muslim vote. Following the internal inquiry, the party removed KPCC minority cell chief Abdul Jabbar from primary membership and dismissed Naseer Ahmed, political secretary to Chief Minister Siddaramaiah, making them the first two functionaries to lose their positions over the bypoll controversy. Khan, however, faced no formal disciplinary action.

Khan subsequently met Chief Minister Siddaramaiah to explain his conduct and maintained to reporters that Muslim leaders within Congress remained united. The Congress ultimately won the Davanagere South bypoll on 4 May 2026 with candidate Samarth Mallikarjun securing 69,578 votes and a lead of 5,708 votes. However, the SDPI's vote share in the constituency surged from under 1 per cent in 2023 to approximately 12 per cent — a shift widely attributed to internal Congress dissension over minority outreach during the campaign.

== Notes ==
- Poovanna, Sharan (14 April 2026). "Siddaramaiah's political secy Naseer Ahmed gets the axe as Congress fixes blame for Davanagere rebellion". The Print.
- "Bypoll sabotage row: Zameer meets CM Siddaramaiah, explains himself". Deccan Herald. 14 April 2026.
- "Bypoll sabotage row: Didn't go to Kerala for party, was there doing party work — B Z Zameer Ahmed Khan". Deccan Herald. 15 April 2026.
- "Karnataka: Congress wins Bagalkot & Davanagere South bye-polls, retains Assembly strength". The News Minute. 4 May 2026.
- "Davanagere South bypoll: Congress Muslim leaders allege plot within party to sabotage candidate". Sahil Online. 10 April 2026.
- "Minority outreach gains focus as Cong intensifies strategy in Davanagere". The Hans India. 4 April 2026.
- "B Zameer Ahmed Khan audio clip: Karnataka Congress Davanagere bypoll row". India Today. 1 June 2026.
