= 2012 Mangalore homestay attack =

Attack in Mangalore, Karnataka

On 28 July 2012, activists belonging to the Hindu Jagarana Vedike affiliated with the Sangh Parivar, allegedly attacked a birthday party at an unlicensed homestay in Mangalore, Karnataka.

The 12 people at the party, including 5 girls, were allegedly beaten, stripped and molested. The faces of some girls were blackened. The activists claimed the youngsters were consuming alcohol and were involved in "some indecent activities".

Hundreds of locals, including women, staged protests complaining police had not taken steps to check "illegal activities" in the home-stay despite complaining on several occasions. Hindu Jagaran Vedike President Jagadish Karanth demanded and check on such "obscene activities".

Parts of the attack were captured on camera by a reporter at the scene, and were shown on various news channels.

Twenty two activists were arrested in the following days.

== Government response ==
Karnataka Home Minister R. Ashok condemned the attack and said police would take strict action and would not tolerate such incidents.

=== Police ===
The government sent a senior police officer, Bipin Gopalakrishnan to visit the spot and investigate. Based on his extensive investigation, Gopalakrishnan made it clear that the boys and girls were colleagues. He also said that there was no use of drugs or any other illegal material at the party and the group of youngsters wanted to leave the home stay by 7:30 pm.

=== Karnataka State Women's Commission ===
The Women's Commission, which is not an investigating agency, contradicted the police findings. Its chairman, C. Manjula, continued to insist that it was a rave party, despite police confirming no drugs were involved. She asked the home ministry to investigate the victims, and claimed they were involved in human trafficking.

Manjula also blamed "pseudo-feminists" for allegedly not raising their voice over other instances of atrocities against women.

She claimed that people at the homestay were consuming drugs, and blamed the "irresponsible" district administration "for such behaviour of youths". The chairperson also demanded unlicensed homestays in Mangalore be shut down and asked home ministry to "initiate an inquiry into the antecedents of the two boys" who were victimized.

==== Commission report ====
The Commission submitted a report to the Home Ministry on 29 July.

The report recommends investigation into whether the 'boys who organised the birthday party had misled the girls'. In direct contradiction to the police investigation, chairman Manjula claimed that people at the homestay were consuming drugs, and blamed the "irresponsible" district administration "for such behaviour of youths".

The Commission also recommended the use of a separate cell for missing trafficked women.

It also demands that the father of one of the girls at the party, who is a police official, should be transferred out of the district.

== Legality of Homestay ==
Loretta Rebello is the proprietor of the homestay 'Morning Mist'. One of the victims claimed that they paid a sum of Rs 10,000 for five hours (2.30 pm to 7.30 pm) to party in the 'Morning Mist,' a bungalow with many bedrooms.

Mangalore City Corporation Officer Manjunath Shetty said Loretta Rebello did not possess any commercial licence to run the homestay. Deccan Herald reports Rebello started renting it out on hourly basis about two years ago.

== Public reaction ==
Prohibitory order were immediately slapped on the city. Colleges in the city stayed closed for a day in protest.

=== Seminar of C Manjula ===
Kannada thinker M Chidananda Murthy, senior advocate Pramila Nesargi, Women's Commission head C Manjula and KSTB chairperson Sacchinanda Hegde said the victims were under the influence of alcohol.

They claimed alcohol was the main reason for attack at the Morning Mist Homestay in Mangalore. Sacchinanda Hegde insisted that the 5 girls and 2 boys were part of a rave party. He further claimed media portrayed it as a birthday bash as a daughter of a police official was present at the party and claimed officials had found beer bottles at the homestay.

== See also ==
- 2009 Mangalore pub attack
- 2008 attacks on Christians in southern Karnataka
