= Bilkis Bano =

Bilkis Bano may refer to:

- Bilkis Bano (politician), Indian politician and Member of the Karnataka Legislative Council
- Bilkis Bano case, involving a victim of the 2002 Gujarat riots
- Bilkis Dadi (born 1938), Indian activist, also known as Bilkis Bano
