= C. Puttarangashetty =

Indian politician

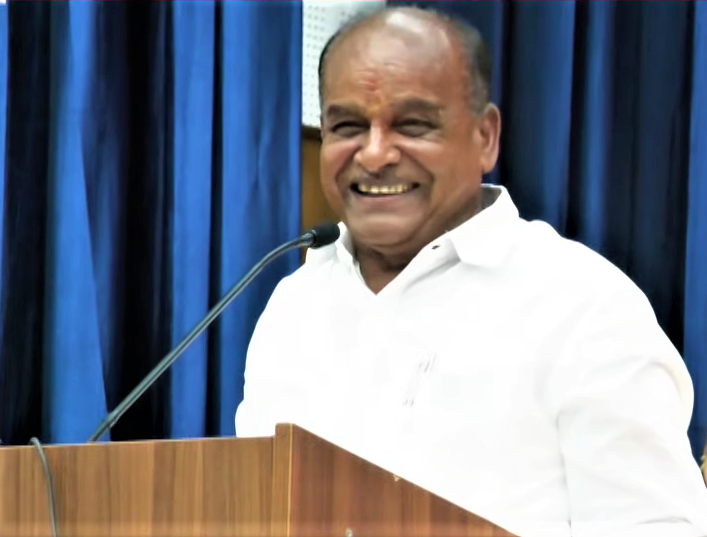

Minister for Animal Husbandry and Sericulture, Government of Karnataka
- Incumbent
- Assumed office 12 August 2026
- Governor: Thawar Chand Gehlot; Sudha Yadav
- Chief Minister: D. K. Shivakumar

Member of the Karnataka Legislative Assembly
- Incumbent
- Assumed office 2008
- Preceded by: Vatal Nagaraj
- Constituency: Chamarajanagar

Personal details
- Born: 30 November 1954 (age 71)
- Party: Indian National Congress

C. Puttarangashetty (born 30 November 1954) is an Indian politician of the Indian National Congress who serves as Karnataka's Minister for Animal Husbandry and Sericulture.

He has represented Chamarajanagar Assembly constituency in the Karnataka Legislative Assembly since 2008, winning four consecutive Assembly elections in 2008, 2013, 2018 and 2023.

He previously served as Karnataka's Minister of Backward Classes Welfare in the coalition government led by H. D. Kumaraswamy from 2018 to 2019.

== Early Life and Education ==
Puttarangashetty was born on 30 November 1954 in Uppinamole village, in present-day Chamarajanagar district, Karnataka. He belongs to the Uppara community, one of the state's backward class communities. He completed his Bachelor of Arts degree at Sri Mahadeshwara College, Kollegal, affiliated with the University of Mysore.

== Political Career ==
Puttarangashetty was first elected to the Karnataka Legislative Assembly from Chamarajanagar in 2008. He retained the seat in 2013 and 2018 and won a fourth consecutive term in 2023. In the 2023 election, he defeated V. Somanna of the Bharatiya Janata Party by 7,533 votes, receiving 83,858 votes.

He served as a parliamentary secretary from 2015 to 2018 and was appointed chairman of the Karnataka State Road Development Corporation. In 2018, he became Minister of Backward Classes Welfare in the Congress-JDS coalition government led by H. D. Kumaraswamy, serving until 2019.

He was appointed chairman of Mysore Sales International Limited (MSIL) in January 2024.

On 3 August 2026, Puttarangashetty was sworn in as a cabinet minister in the government led by Chief Minister D. K. Shivakumar.

== 2019 Cash-Seizure Investigation ==
In January 2019, police seized ₹25.76 lakh from a person working in the office of Puttarangashetty, who was then the Backward Classes Welfare Minister. A Bengaluru Special Court rejected an additional Karnataka Lokayukta police investigation report in May 2026 and ordered further investigation, citing shortcomings in the probe. In July 2026, the Karnataka High Court dismissed Puttarangashetty's petition challenging the special court order as premature. The High Court noted that he had not been named as an accused in either of the police charge sheets discussed in its ruling.
