= Chamarajanagar Assembly constituency =

Legislative Assembly constituency in Karnataka, India

Coordinates: 11.92°N 76.94°E

Chamarajanagar
- Constituency No. 223 for the Karnataka Legislative Assembly

Constituency details
- Country: India
- Region: South India
- State: Karnataka
- District: Chamarajanagar
- Lok Sabha constituency: Chamarajanagar
- Established: 1956
- Total electors: 209,521 (2023)
- Reservation: None

Member of Legislative Assembly
- 16th Karnataka Legislative Assembly
- Incumbent C. Puttarangashetty
- Party: Indian National Congress
- Elected year: 2023
- Preceded by: Vatal Nagaraj

Chamarajanagar Assembly constituency is one of the 224 constituencies in Karnataka Legislative Assembly in India. It is part of Chamarajanagar Lok Sabha constituency.

== Members of the Legislative Assembly ==
Election	Member	Party
1952	U. M. Madappa	Kisan Mazdoor Praja Party
1957	U. M. Madappa	Praja Socialist Party
1957	B. Rachaiah	Indian National Congress
1962	M. C. Basappa	Indian National Congress
1967	S. Puttaswamy	Independent politician
1972	S. Puttaswamy	Indian National Congress
1978	M. C. Basappa	Janata Party
1983	S. Puttaswamy	Indian National Congress
1985	S. Puttaswamy	Indian National Congress
1989	Vatal Nagaraj	Independent politician
1994	Vatal Nagaraj	Kannada Chalavali Vatal Paksha
1999	C. Guruswamy	Bharatiya Janata Party
2004	Vatal Nagaraj	Kannada Chalavali Vatal Paksha
2008	C. Puttarangashetty	Indian National Congress
2013	C. Puttarangashetty	Indian National Congress
2018	C. Puttarangashetty	Indian National Congress
2023	C. Puttarangashetty	Indian National Congress

== Election results ==
=== Assembly Election 2023 ===
2023 Karnataka Legislative Assembly election : Chamarajanagar
Party	Candidate	Votes	%	±%
INC	C. Puttarangashetty	83,858	48.46%	▲3.00
BJP	V. Somanna	76,325	44.10%	▲1.58
BSP	Ha. Ra. Mahesh	6,461	3.73%	▼0.54
JD(S)	Mallikarjuna Swamy. A. M	1,082	0.63%	New
NOTA	None of the above	794	0.46%	▼0.77
Margin of victory		7,533	4.35%	▲1.41
Turnout		173,225	82.68%	▲1.59
Total valid votes		173,057		
Registered electors		209,521		▲1.63
INC hold		Swing	▲3.00	

=== Assembly Election 2018 ===
2018 Karnataka Legislative Assembly election : Chamarajanagar
Party	Candidate	Votes	%	±%
INC	C. Puttarangashetty	75,963	45.46%	▲8.37
BJP	K. R. Mallikarjunappa	71,050	42.52%	▲37.81
BSP	A. M. Mallikarjunaswamy (Alur Mallu)	7,134	4.27%	▼2.05
Kannada Chalavali Vatal Paksha	Vatal Nagaraj	5,977	3.58%	▼8.96
NOTA	None of the above	2,063	1.23%	New
Margin of victory		4,913	2.94%	▼4.69
Turnout		167,173	81.09%	▲2.50
Total valid votes		167,111		
Registered electors		206,162		▲10.32
INC hold		Swing	▲8.37	

=== Assembly Election 2013 ===
2013 Karnataka Legislative Assembly election : Chamarajanagar
Party	Candidate	Votes	%	±%
INC	C. Puttarangashetty	54,440	37.09%	▲3.16
KJP	K. R. Mallikarjunappa	43,244	29.47%	New
Kannada Chalavali Vatal Paksha	Vatal Nagaraj	18,408	12.54%	▲3.31
BSP	R. P. Nanjundaswamy	9,278	6.32%	▼0.84
BJP	Somanayaka. S	6,919	4.71%	▼27.11
Karnataka Makkala Paksha	K. Veerabhadraswamy	4,504	3.07%	New
JD(S)	S. P. Sannamadasetty	2,696	1.84%	▼5.36
Independent	Raju	2,053	1.40%	New
CPI(ML)L	M. C. Rajanna	1,181	0.80%	New
Margin of victory		11,196	7.63%	▲5.52
Turnout		146,861	78.59%	▲6.24
Total valid votes		146,760		
Registered electors		186,873		▲9.08
INC hold		Swing	▲3.16	

=== Assembly Election 2008 ===
2008 Karnataka Legislative Assembly election : Chamarajanagar
Party	Candidate	Votes	%	±%
INC	C. Puttarangashetty	42,017	33.93%	▲10.95
BJP	M. Mahadev	39,405	31.82%	▲26.28
Kannada Chalavali Vatal Paksha	Vatal Nagaraj	11,426	9.23%	▼22.81
JD(S)	M. Shivakumar	8,919	7.20%	▼1.46
BSP	G. M. Gadkar	8,866	7.16%	▼1.01
Independent	Siddaraju	3,677	2.97%	New
Independent	Mohammad Innayath Ulla	3,549	2.87%	New
SKP	A. M. Mahesh Prabhu	1,807	1.46%	New
Independent	H. Lakshmana Shetru	1,335	1.08%	New
Margin of victory		2,612	2.11%	▼6.95
Turnout		123,948	72.35%	▲1.25
Total valid votes		123,823		
Registered electors		171,315		▲5.27
INC gain from Kannada Chalavali Vatal Paksha		Swing	▲1.89	

=== Assembly Election 2004 ===
2004 Karnataka Legislative Assembly election : Chamarajanagar
Party	Candidate	Votes	%	±%
Kannada Chalavali Vatal Paksha	Vatal Nagaraj	37,072	32.04%	▲4.80
INC	Dr. Manjula. B. P	26,589	22.98%	▲4.63
Independent	G. M. Gadkar	22,030	19.04%	New
JD(S)	Kumaraswamy. R	10,015	8.66%	▲4.29
BSP	Puttaraju	9,449	8.17%	▲5.05
BJP	Ravishankar. M. S	6,415	5.54%	▼38.29
JP	Ravichandra. G. S	2,502	2.16%	New
Kannada Nadu Party	Prakash Mr	1,618	1.40%	New
Margin of victory		10,483	9.06%	▼7.52
Turnout		115,706	71.10%	▼2.90
Total valid votes		115,690		
Registered electors		162,731		▲5.37
Kannada Chalavali Vatal Paksha gain from BJP		Swing	▼11.79	

=== Assembly Election 1999 ===
1999 Karnataka Legislative Assembly election : Chamarajanagar
Party	Candidate	Votes	%	±%
BJP	C. Guruswamy	46,300	43.83%	▲31.42
Kannada Chalavali Vatal Paksha	Vatal Nagaraj	28,781	27.24%	▲0.55
INC	G. M. Gadkar	19,384	18.35%	▼2.71
JD(S)	Hanumantha Setty	4,614	4.37%	New
BSP	C. M. Krishnamurthy	3,292	3.12%	New
KRRS	H. B. Mahadevaswamy	2,092	1.98%	▼2.02
Independent	Sha. Muruli	767	0.73%	New
Margin of victory		17,519	16.58%	▲10.94
Turnout		114,283	74.00%	▼2.17
Total valid votes		105,640		
Rejected ballots		8,608	7.53%	▲4.87
Registered electors		154,442		▲7.72
BJP gain from Kannada Chalavali Vatal Paksha		Swing	▲17.14	

=== Assembly Election 1994 ===
1994 Karnataka Legislative Assembly election : Chamarajanagar
Party	Candidate	Votes	%	±%
Kannada Chalavali Vatal Paksha	Vatal Nagaraj	28,334	26.69%	New
INC	S. Puttaswamy	22,352	21.06%	▼11.29
JD	C. Guruswamy	21,162	19.94%	▼3.52
BJP	A. S. Nataraju	13,170	12.41%	▲11.11
INC	Hanumantha Setty	10,344	9.74%	New
KRRS	Malleshu	4,251	4.00%	New
Independent	M. C. Swamy	2,595	2.44%	New
Independent	M. Madaiah	1,569	1.48%	New
Independent	K. Nagendra	1,389	1.31%	New
Margin of victory		5,982	5.64%	▼0.77
Turnout		109,199	76.17%	▲2.04
Total valid votes		106,150		
Rejected ballots		2,907	2.66%	▼3.96
Registered electors		143,371		▲7.93
Kannada Chalavali Vatal Paksha gain from Independent		Swing	▼12.07	

=== Assembly Election 1989 ===
1989 Karnataka Legislative Assembly election : Chamarajanagar
Party	Candidate	Votes	%	±%
Independent	Vatal Nagaraj	35,642	38.76%	New
INC	S. Puttaswamy	29,749	32.35%	▼8.37
JD	C. Guruswamy	21,570	23.46%	New
JP	H. M. Kanta Raju	1,586	1.72%	New
BJP	M. N. Guruswamy	1,191	1.30%	New
Margin of victory		5,893	6.41%	▼3.01
Turnout		98,471	74.13%	▼2.22
Total valid votes		91,949		
Rejected ballots		6,522	6.62%	▲4.54
Registered electors		132,837		▲21.31
Independent gain from INC		Swing	▼1.96	

=== Assembly Election 1985 ===
1985 Karnataka Legislative Assembly election : Chamarajanagar
Party	Candidate	Votes	%	±%
INC	S. Puttaswamy	33,335	40.72%	▼6.79
JP	M. C. Parashivappa	25,625	31.30%	▲21.32
Independent	Vatal Nagaraj	21,758	26.58%	New
Independent	Y. S. Lingaiah	1,149	1.40%	New
Margin of victory		7,710	9.42%	▲1.30
Turnout		83,609	76.35%	▲3.92
Total valid votes		81,867		
Rejected ballots		1,742	2.08%	▼0.37
Registered electors		109,502		▲6.23
INC hold		Swing	▼6.79	

=== Assembly Election 1983 ===
1983 Karnataka Legislative Assembly election : Chamarajanagar
Party	Candidate	Votes	%	±%
INC	S. Puttaswamy	34,607	47.51%	▲19.98
Independent	Vatal Nagaraj	28,690	39.39%	New
JP	M. Shivanja Shetty	7,269	9.98%	▼38.86
BJP	Genesh Dixit	1,243	1.71%	New
Independent	N. M. Guruswamy	502	0.69%	New
Margin of victory		5,917	8.12%	▼13.19
Turnout		74,661	72.43%	▼8.28
Total valid votes		72,835		
Rejected ballots		1,826	2.45%	▼0.05
Registered electors		103,080		▲8.87
INC gain from JP		Swing	▼1.33	

=== Assembly Election 1978 ===
1978 Karnataka Legislative Assembly election : Chamarajanagar
Party	Candidate	Votes	%	±%
JP	M. C. Basappa	36,389	48.84%	New
INC	S. Puttaswamy	20,511	27.53%	▼22.90
INC(I)	R. Venkataranga Naika	16,862	22.63%	New
Independent	Kunnamaddaiah	743	1.00%	New
Margin of victory		15,878	21.31%	▲18.28
Turnout		76,412	80.71%	▲6.33
Total valid votes		74,505		
Rejected ballots		1,907	2.50%	▲2.50
Registered electors		94,678		▲41.97
JP gain from INC		Swing	▼1.59	

=== Assembly Election 1972 ===
1972 Mysore State Legislative Assembly election : Chamarajanagar
Party	Candidate	Votes	%	±%
INC	S. Puttaswamy	24,218	50.43%	▲6.37
INC(O)	M. C. Basappa	22,764	47.40%	New
ABJS	M. Srikantiah	1,039	2.16%	▼3.91
Margin of victory		1,454	3.03%	▼0.30
Turnout		49,601	74.38%	▲0.10
Total valid votes		48,021		
Registered electors		66,688		▲21.31
INC gain from Independent		Swing	▲3.04	

=== Assembly Election 1967 ===
1967 Mysore State Legislative Assembly election : Chamarajanagar
Party	Candidate	Votes	%	±%
Independent	S. Puttaswamy	17,948	47.39%	New
INC	M. C. Basappa	16,686	44.06%	▼11.12
ABJS	M. Mahadevaiah	2,300	6.07%	New
Independent	M. Puttadevaiah	937	2.47%	New
Margin of victory		1,262	3.33%	▼7.03
Turnout		40,835	74.28%	▲4.31
Total valid votes		37,871		
Registered electors		54,974		▲7.26
Independent gain from INC		Swing	▼7.79	

=== Assembly Election 1962 ===
1962 Mysore State Legislative Assembly election : Chamarajanagar
Party	Candidate	Votes	%	±%
INC	M. C. Basappa	18,783	55.18%	▲12.17
PSP	U. M. Madappa	15,255	44.82%	▼4.52
Margin of victory		3,528	10.36%	▲6.93
Turnout		35,862	69.97%	▲23.25
Total valid votes		34,038		
Registered electors		51,252		▼41.63
INC gain from PSP		Swing	▲28.79	

=== Assembly Election 1957 ===
1957 Mysore State Legislative Assembly election : Chamarajanagar
Party	Candidate	Votes	%	±%
PSP	U. M. Madappa	21,648	26.39%	New
INC	B. Rachaiah	18,874	23.01%	▲0.33
PSP	B. Basavaiah	18,832	22.95%	New
INC	R. Venkataranga Naika	16,413	20.01%	▼2.67
Independent	M. Puttamadaiah	3,721	4.54%	New
Independent	M. Puttadevaiah	2,554	3.11%	New
Margin of victory		2,816	3.43%	▼9.64
Turnout		82,042	46.72%	▼3.76
Total valid votes		82,042		
Registered electors		87,811		▲157.86
PSP gain from KMPP		Swing	▼17.29	

=== Assembly Election 1952 ===
1952 Mysore State Legislative Assembly election : Chamarajanagar
Party	Candidate	Votes	%	±%
KMPP	U. M. Madappa	7,509	43.68%	New
Independent	M. C. Basappa	5,263	30.62%	New
INC	S. Puttananjappa	3,898	22.68%	New
Independent	K. V. Veeranna	519	3.02%	New
Margin of victory		2,246	13.07%	
Turnout		17,189	50.48%	
Total valid votes		17,189		
Registered electors		34,054		
KMPP win (new seat)				

== See also ==
- List of constituencies of Karnataka Legislative Assembly
