= Mumtaz Ali Khan =

Mumtaz Ali Khan may refer to:

- Mumtaz Ali Khan (politician)
- Mumtaz Ali Khan (musician)
