= KCVP =

KCVP may refer to:

- KCVP (FM), a radio station (88.3 FM) licensed to serve Pierre, South Dakota, United States
- Kannada Chalavali Vatal Paksha
