= 2021 anti-Christian violence in Karnataka =

Anti-Christian violence in Karnataka, India

The 2021 anti-Christian violence in Karnataka refers to the series violence against Christians by right wing Hindutva groups in the Indian state of Karnataka in 2021. The attacks increased after September 2021 when leaders of Bharatiya Janata Party (BJP) declared of an anti-conversion bill in the state to check religious conversions. The violence again intensified over the Christmas period when right-wing mobs disrupted Christmas celebrations. The Human rights organisation, People's Union for Civil Liberties (PUCL) documented 39 violent incidents against Christians in Karnataka from January to November 2021, all carried out by Hindutva organizations. The violence included physical assaults, church vandalism, filming the attacks and later circulating the videos to celebrate.

In many cases, the local administration and the police told Christians to stop holding prayer meetings in order to avert violence by right wing groups. The PUCL reported that the local police and the local Kannada media had collaborated with Hindutva activists during the attacks. The report also stated that the perpetrators abused their victims with casteist slurs in almost all of their attacks.

== Background ==
In 1971, Christians accounted for 2.09 percent of Karnataka's population and 2.60 percent of India's population while in 2011, the Christian population decreased to 1.87 percent of the Karnataka's population and 2.3 percent of India's population. Attacks against Christians all over India increased since the BJP regime took over the country in 2014.

Activists alleged that the number of vigilantism increased after Basavaraj Bommai took office as the Chief minister of Karnataka in July 2021. According to the Karnataka Communal Harmony Forum, over 120 communal incidents occurred in the districts of Udupi and Dakshina Kannada of Coastal Karnataka in 2021, the highest number in the previous four years.

There was a significant increase in vigilante attacks against Christians all over the country in December 2021, including many attacks by Hindutva organizations. A number of these were carried out by mobs organized by Hindu right-wing outfits, especially on the basis of accusations of religious conversion. The majority of these occurred in BJP-ruled states.

=== Protection of Right to Freedom of Religion Act, 2021 ===
The issue of forcible conversions gained momentum since September 2021 when a BJP politician, Goolihatti Shekhar from Hosadurga, claimed that there was a huge number of forced conversions to Christianity had occurred in his constituency including his mother. However, officials conducted a survey in Hosadurga and concluded that there was no forcible act of religious conversion and Christians attend prayers in churches voluntarily and without coercion. The tehsildar who conducted the investigation was transferred out on December 16 without any posting. On October 16, the Karnataka's Intelligence Department issued a directive to top police and intelligence officers in Karnataka to acquire information on "authorized and unauthorised" churches. The police department, which is overseen by the Home Minister of Karnataka, Araga Jnanendra, concluded that no unauthorised churches exist inside any of the district boundaries in Karnataka.

In the aftermath of numerous attacks on churches by right-wing organizations, the BJP administration was able to get the Karnataka Protection of Right to Freedom of Religion Act, 2021 or anti-conversion law passed in the lower house of the state legislature on December 23, 2021, in the winter session in Belagavi. The bill makes it illegal to convert a person by deception, undue influence, force, allurement, coercion or any other fraudulent methods. It prohibits conversion for marriage, a long-standing demand of right-wingers who claimed of an increase in the Love jihad conspiracy. Conversion to Hinduism has been excluded since the BJP claimed it is about the return of Hindus who have accepted a foreign religion. The Bill seeks a maximum sentence of ten years in prison for forced religious conversion of minors, women and persons from Scheduled Castes and Scheduled Tribes.

Several parties, including the Christian community and human rights groups opposed the Bill, alleging that it might be abused to target religious minorities. The New York Times reported that the anti-conversion laws are part of the BJP's strategy of using religion to polarize the people and gain support from the Hindu majority.

== Violence ==
A series of attacks were carried out by HINDUTHVA groups and vigilante groups against Christians in Karnataka in 2021. The attacks increased after September 2021 when leaders of BJP including Chief minister Basavaraj Bommai declared of an "anti-conversion" bill in the state to check religious conversions. The violence intensified over the Christmas period when right-wing Hindu mobs disrupted Christmas celebrations. The majority of the attacks were carried out by the Bajrang Dal, Banjara Nigama and the Hindu Jagaran Vedike (HJV). Incidents of Hindutva activists affiliated to right-wing organisations such as the Bajrang Dal and Sri Rama Sene barging into churches and Christian prayer halls were reported across several places including Udupi, Chikballapur, Kodagu, Belagavi, Kanakapura and Arsikere.

Christians missionaries were trying to convert the Dalit and adivasi into Christianity. Missionary community were the most affected. In some cases after CONVERTING to Christianity still keep the identity of DALITS ADIVASI for the Reservation In many cases, the local administration and the police told Christians to stop holding prayer meetings in order to avert violence by right wing groups. Many Christians faced social boycotts and threats.

== Incidents ==
- On September 10, right-wing activists including members of the Hindu Jagarana Vedike forced into a Christian prayer facility in Karkala, Udupi district, and reportedly assaulted the devotees while a prayer service was taking place.
- On October 18, activists of the Bajrang Dal and Vishwa Hindu Parishad forced into a church sang Hindu prayer songs as a protest and accused the Church of forced religious conversions.
- On November 7, 25 vigilantes allegedly disrupted a prayer gathering at a temporary prayer hall in Aladakatti, Haveri, and physically manhandled a preacher.
- On November 7, right-wing activists of the Sri Rama Sene Hindustan reportedly locked up a preacher and congregants in a prayer facility in Belagavi.
- On November 29, Bajrang Dal activists barged into a prayer hall and stopped the service midway in Belur, Hassan district accusing them of religious conversion.
- On December 11, a man wielding a sword chased a parish priest and attempted to assault him at the St. Joseph Worker Church in Belagavi.
- On December 12, members of right-wing groups set fire to Christian religious books in Kolar, accusing the Church of conversion.
- On December 12, a mob of Hindutva activists disrupted a prayer session in Srinivasapura, Kolar claiming illegal religious conversion.
- On December 23, right-wing activists of the Hindu Jagarana Vedike forced into a Christian school and disrupted the Christmas celebrations.
- On December 23, a 150-year-old church was vandalized in Chikkaballapur district.
- On December 24, members of the RSS disrupted a child's naming ceremony in Hubli district and accused people religious conversion.
- On December 28, a gang of Hindutva vigilantes forced into a residence in Tumakuru where Dalit women were attending a Christmas function.
- On December 29, members of a Hindutva group allegedly assaulted and robbed a family and accused them of conversion. A women was hospitalized for burn injuries when the group splashed hot curry on her. The Bajrang Dal alleged that the family assaulted them in a police complaint. The police said that no conversions took place and the family did not assault the Hindutva members.

== Reports ==
According to a fact-finding report released in December 2021 by numerous civil society organizations, Karnataka has one of the highest incidence of attacks on Christians. According to the report, Karnataka ranks third in India in terms of the number of attacks against the Christians and their religious sites after Uttar Pradesh and Chhattisgarh.

=== People's Union for Civil Liberties ===
The Human rights organisation, People's Union for Civil Liberties (PUCL) published a report titled "Criminalising Practice of Faith- A Report" on hate crimes against Christians in Karnataka. The report documented 39 violent incidents against Christians in Karnataka from January to November 2021. These incidents occurred at churches and prayer halls throughout the state, with Belagavi in northern Karnataka having the largest number of incidences. The report noted that in nearly every case of mob violence, the police actively attempted to criminalize the lives of Christians and prevent them from holding prayer meetings. The perpetrators are all Hindutva organizations, such as the RSS, Hindu Jagrana Vedike, Bajrang Dal, and a more violent, new organization named Banjara Nigama. Local police have been spotted collaborating with Hindutva extremists to instil fear and hatred towards Christians, and the police frequently looked the other way to incidences of violence, sexual attacks, abuse and social and economic boycotts. The report stated that "mass conversion" as claimed by attackers, is an excuse for violence on Churches and Christians.

It reported that major Kannada news agencies such as Asianet Suvarna News, TV 5 and Public TV broadcast a mix of false arguments, blatant lies, misleading statements, one-sided reporting and prejudice in favour of Hindutva groups and against Christianity. The study also examined that the mainstream media reporting coordinated with the online activities of Hindutva through videos of the attacks uploaded on social media.

In nearly every incident, the perpetrators yelled casteist insults and abuse at those present in the prayer meetings. The report said that the attackers hurl casteist slurs since the Christians in rural areas are mostly daily wage workers and labourers from Dalit communities.

==== Mob operations ====
The PUCL observed a pattern in the operations of the mob. This includes Hindutva mobs beating people up, vandalizing churches, filming the incidents and then sharing the footage to celebrate a "Hindu victory".

1. Hindutva leaders organize a mob and designate locations in their community where Sunday prayers are held.
2. The mob notifies the local police department of the impending attack that they are going to carry out.
3. The mob of 25 to 30 people breaks into the religious building, accusing preachers of proselytizing. They spew casteist remarks at them and beat them with sticks and rods. Women are sexually, verbally and physically assaulted.
4. Soon, the cops arrive to the spot and violently demand identification papers. In the majority of cases, police showed up minutes after the mob crashed a prayer meeting. On several occasions, instead of helping victims of assault, the police took pastors and worshippers to police stations and booked cases.

== See also ==
- 2008 Kandhamal violence
- 1999 Ranalai violence
- 1998 attacks on Christians in southeastern Gujarat
