= Chamrajpet Assembly constituency =

Legislative Assembly constituency in Karnataka, India

Coordinates: 12.96°N 77.56°E

Chamrajpet
- Constituency No. 168 for the Karnataka Legislative Assembly

Constituency details
- Country: India
- Region: South India
- State: Karnataka
- District: Bangalore Urban
- Lok Sabha constituency: Bangalore Central
- Established: 1951
- Total electors: 229,914 (2023)
- Reservation: None

Member of Legislative Assembly
- 16th Karnataka Legislative Assembly
- Incumbent B. Z. Zameer Ahmed Khan
- Party: Indian National Congress
- Elected year: 2023
- Preceded by: S. M. Krishna

Chamrajpet Assembly constituency is one of the seats in the Karnataka Legislative Assembly in India. It is part of Bangalore Central Lok Sabha constituency. Its composition is around 44% Muslim and 20% Dalit.

== Members of the Legislative Assembly ==
Election	Member	Party
1952	R. Anantharaman	Indian National Congress
1957	Lakshmidevi Ramanna	Indian National Congress
1962	R. Dayananda Sagar	Indian National Congress
1967	R. Dayananda Sagar	Indian National Congress
1972	Vatal Nagaraj	Independent politician
1975 By-election (Note: Election declared void by the Supreme Court)	K. Prabhakara Reddy	Independent politician
1978	S. Pramila	Janata Party
1983	M. Obanna Raju	Janata Party
1985	Mohammad Moienuddin	Janata Party
1989	R. V. Devaraj	Indian National Congress
1994	Pramila Nesargi	Bharatiya Janata Party
1999	R. V. Devaraj	Indian National Congress
2004	S. M. Krishna	Indian National Congress
2005 By-election	B. Z. Zameer Ahmed Khan	Janata Dal
2008	B. Z. Zameer Ahmed Khan	Janata Dal
2013	B. Z. Zameer Ahmed Khan	Janata Dal
2018	B. Z. Zameer Ahmed Khan	Indian National Congress
2023	B. Z. Zameer Ahmed Khan	Indian National Congress

== Election results ==
=== Assembly Election 2023 ===
2023 Karnataka Legislative Assembly election : Chamrajpet
Party	Candidate	Votes	%	±%
INC	B. Z. Zameer Ahmed Khan	77,631	62.22	▲7.87
BJP	Bhaskar Rao	23,678	18.98	▼7.81
JD(S)	C. Govindaraj	19,086	15.30	▼0.83
NOTA	None of the above	1,130	0.91	▲0.31
BSP	Narasimha Murthy	916	0.73	New
UPP	V. Somashekar	779	0.62	New
Margin of victory		53,953	43.24	▲15.67
Turnout		124,805	54.28	▼0.15
Total valid votes		124,767		
Registered electors		229,914		▲4.06
INC hold		Swing	▲7.87	

=== Assembly Election 2018 ===
2018 Karnataka Legislative Assembly election : Chamrajpet
Party	Candidate	Votes	%	±%
INC	B. Z. Zameer Ahmed Khan	65,339	54.35	▲30.29
BJP	M. Lakshminarayana	32,202	26.79	▲10.51
JD(S)	B. K. Altaf Khan	19,393	16.13	▼35.65
NOTA	None of the above	726	0.60	New
Margin of victory		33,137	27.57	▼0.15
Turnout		120,253	54.43	▼4.49
Total valid votes		120,209		
Registered electors		220,951		▲20.73
INC gain from JD(S)		Swing	▲2.57	

=== Assembly Election 2013 ===
2013 Karnataka Legislative Assembly election : Chamrajpet
Party	Candidate	Votes	%	±%
JD(S)	B. Z. Zameer Ahmed Khan	56,339	51.78	▲3.37
INC	G. A. Bava	26,177	24.06	▲6.92
BJP	B. V. Ganesh	17,720	16.28	▼10.08
SDPI	Usman Baig	2,942	2.70	New
Independent	Subramani. T	917	0.84	New
Margin of victory		30,162	27.72	▲5.67
Turnout		107,843	58.92	▲18.02
Total valid votes		108,814		
Registered electors		183,020		▼15.73
JD(S) hold		Swing	▲3.37	

=== Assembly Election 2008 ===
2008 Karnataka Legislative Assembly election : Chamrajpet
Party	Candidate	Votes	%	±%
JD(S)	B. Z. Zameer Ahmed Khan	43,004	48.41	▲6.05
BJP	V. S. Shama Sundar	23,414	26.36	▲5.24
INC	Sayeed Ahmedd	15,229	17.14	▼17.41
BSP	N. P. Samy	3,474	3.91	New
AIADMK	Daiva Sagayam. M. C	924	1.04	New
Independent	Hidayath Ulla	897	1.01	New
Independent	Johnson Chinnappan	534	0.60	New
Margin of victory		19,590	22.05	▲14.24
Turnout		88,838	40.90	▼3.15
Total valid votes		88,831		
Registered electors		217,194		▲103.20
JD(S) hold		Swing	▲6.05	

=== Assembly By-election 2005 ===
2005 Karnataka Legislative Assembly by-election : Chamrajpet
Party	Candidate	Votes	%	±%
JD(S)	B. Z. Zameer Ahmed Khan	19,943	42.36	▲31.80
INC	R. V. Devaraj	16,265	34.55	▼23.37
BJP	Pramila Nesargi	9,944	21.12	▼8.18
Margin of victory		3,678	7.81	▼20.81
Turnout		47,083	44.05	▼5.15
Total valid votes		47,082		
Registered electors		106,885		▲9.97
JD(S) gain from INC		Swing	▼15.56	

=== Assembly Election 2004 ===
2004 Karnataka Legislative Assembly election : Chamrajpet
Party	Candidate	Votes	%	±%
INC	S. M. Krishna	27,695	57.92	▲3.80
BJP	Mukhyamantri Chandru	14,010	29.30	▼5.91
JD(S)	Ananth Nag	5,052	10.56	▲3.74
Independent	Naveed Ahmed. S (anu)	549	1.15	New
Margin of victory		13,685	28.62	▲9.71
Turnout		47,819	49.20	▼8.41
Total valid votes		47,819		
Registered electors		97,194		▲0.41
INC hold		Swing	▲3.80	

=== Assembly Election 1999 ===
1999 Karnataka Legislative Assembly election : Chamrajpet
Party	Candidate	Votes	%	±%
INC	R. V. Devaraj	30,179	54.12	▲37.21
BJP	Pramila Nesargi	19,636	35.21	▲6.90
JD(S)	Abdul Lateef Khan	3,801	6.82	New
AIADMK	M. Elumalai	838	1.50	New
Margin of victory		10,543	18.91	▲16.78
Turnout		55,763	57.61	▼1.80
Total valid votes		55,763		
Registered electors		96,795		▲2.08
INC gain from BJP		Swing	▲25.81	

=== Assembly Election 1994 ===
1994 Karnataka Legislative Assembly election : Chamrajpet
Party	Candidate	Votes	%	±%
BJP	Pramila Nesargi	15,665	28.31	▲15.76
INC	R. V. Devaraj	14,488	26.18	New
INC	T. V. Maruthi	9,355	16.91	▼34.16
Independent	Abdul Lateef Khan	7,449	13.46	New
JD	Sri Rame Gowda	6,778	12.25	▼16.47
BSP	N. Basheer Ahmed	566	1.02	New
Margin of victory		1,177	2.13	▼20.21
Turnout		56,328	59.41	▲3.94
Total valid votes		55,334		
Rejected ballots		988	1.75	▼2.12
Registered electors		94,820		▼6.21
BJP gain from INC		Swing	▼22.76	

=== Assembly Election 1989 ===
1989 Karnataka Legislative Assembly election : Chamrajpet
Party	Candidate	Votes	%	±%
INC	R. V. Devaraj	27,526	51.07	▲18.13
JD	Mohammad Moienuddin	15,482	28.72	New
BJP	M. Srinivasa Murthy	6,763	12.55	▲5.59
JP	M. Obanna Raju	1,587	2.94	New
Independent	R. S. N. Gowda	667	1.24	New
Independent	Saleemulla Khan	379	0.70	New
Margin of victory		12,044	22.34	▲12.35
Turnout		56,075	55.47	▲4.46
Total valid votes		53,903		
Rejected ballots		2,172	3.87	▲2.88
Registered electors		101,098		▲9.85
INC gain from JP		Swing	▲8.14	

=== Assembly Election 1985 ===
1985 Karnataka Legislative Assembly election : Chamrajpet
Party	Candidate	Votes	%	±%
JP	Mohammad Moienuddin	19,955	42.93	▲6.75
INC	C. Krishnappa	15,311	32.94	▲13.14
Independent	G. Appu	4,648	10.00	New
BJP	M. Srinivasa Murthy	3,237	6.96	▼2.53
Independent	K. Prabhakara Reddy	1,855	3.99	New
Independent	M. H. Eswar	819	1.76	New
Margin of victory		4,644	9.99	▼6.39
Turnout		46,946	51.01	▲39.36
Total valid votes		46,480		
Rejected ballots		466	0.99	▼1.36
Registered electors		92,034		▼78.31
JP hold		Swing	▲6.75	

=== Assembly Election 1983 ===
1983 Karnataka Legislative Assembly election : Chamrajpet
Party	Candidate	Votes	%	±%
JP	M. Obanna Raju	17,455	36.18	▼6.51
INC	S. Pramila	9,553	19.80	▲17.52
Independent	S. R. Mukhtar Ahmed	8,612	17.85	New
BJP	Padma Joshi	4,578	9.49	New
Independent	Angamuthu. M	4,357	9.03	New
Independent	K. Prabhakara Reddy	571	1.18	New
Independent	A. N. Sathya	526	1.09	New
Independent	M. H. Eswar	378	0.78	New
Independent	Mohamed Fazlul Huq Sayeed	316	0.65	New
Margin of victory		7,902	16.38	▲5.90
Turnout		49,406	11.65	▼50.65
Total valid votes		48,247		
Rejected ballots		1,159	2.35	▲0.21
Registered electors		424,243		▲430.66
JP hold		Swing	▼6.51	

=== Assembly Election 1978 ===
1978 Karnataka Legislative Assembly election : Chamrajpet
Party	Candidate	Votes	%	±%
JP	S. Pramila	20,806	42.69	New
INC(I)	Prabhakar. T. S	15,697	32.21	New
AIADMK	Krishnaraju	5,636	11.56	New
Independent	Jayamma. B	2,944	6.04	New
Independent	Narayanaswamy. K	1,183	2.43	New
INC	Khaleel Rahaman. S	1,112	2.28	▼25.06
Independent	Narayanaswamy. K	359	0.74	New
Independent	Keshva Murthy. V	346	0.71	New
Margin of victory		5,109	10.48	▲8.50
Turnout		49,804	62.30	▲6.47
Total valid votes		48,736		
Rejected ballots		1,068	2.14	▲2.14
Registered electors		79,947		▼17.90
JP gain from Independent		Swing	▲13.37	

=== Assembly Election 1972 ===
1972 Mysore State Legislative Assembly election : Chamrajpet
Party	Candidate	Votes	%	±%
Independent	Vatal Nagaraj	15,456	29.32	New
INC	R. Dayananda Sagar	14,412	27.34	▼9.50
Independent	S. N. Narayan	7,662	14.53	New
Independent	H. M. Ismail	7,624	14.46	New
Independent	Dr. B. K. Krishnaiah	3,403	6.45	New
INC(O)	K. M. Nanjappa	2,175	4.13	New
Independent	G. Narayana Kumar	1,091	2.07	New
SWA	S. Samuel	395	0.75	New
Margin of victory		1,044	1.98	▼7.46
Turnout		54,371	55.83	▲4.44
Total valid votes		52,720		
Registered electors		97,379		▲20.12
Independent gain from INC		Swing	▼7.52	

=== Assembly Election 1967 ===
1967 Mysore State Legislative Assembly election : Chamrajpet
Party	Candidate	Votes	%	±%
INC	R. Dayananda Sagar	14,241	36.84	▼16.41
Independent	B. K. Krishniah	10,590	27.39	New
Independent	Krishnamurthy	4,969	12.85	New
Independent	P. N. Narayan	3,415	8.83	New
Independent	N. Ranchiah	3,162	8.18	New
Independent	S. Ahmed	1,667	4.31	New
Independent	B. M. Yellappa	616	1.59	New
Margin of victory		3,651	9.44	▼8.53
Turnout		41,662	51.39	▲4.47
Total valid votes		38,660		
Registered electors		81,067		▲65.39
INC hold		Swing	▼16.41	

=== Assembly Election 1962 ===
1962 Mysore State Legislative Assembly election : Chamrajpet
Party	Candidate	Votes	%	±%
INC	R. Dayananda Sagar	11,897	53.25	▲3.80
SWA	M. Rangaiah Naidu	7,882	35.28	New
CPI	M. S. Rama Rao	1,561	6.99	New
ABJS	S. Sriram	1,000	4.48	New
Margin of victory		4,015	17.97	▲3.75
Turnout		22,998	46.92	▲12.43
Total valid votes		22,340		
Registered electors		49,016		▲12.48
INC hold		Swing	▲3.80	

=== Assembly Election 1957 ===
1957 Mysore State Legislative Assembly election : Chamrajpet
Party	Candidate	Votes	%	±%
INC	Lakshmidevi Ramanna	7,433	49.45	▼13.79
Independent	M. Rangaiah Naidu	5,296	35.23	New
Independent	B. T. Kempanna	1,722	11.46	New
Independent	B. C. Rangappa	580	3.86	New
Margin of victory		2,137	14.22	▼33.21
Turnout		15,031	34.49	▼16.33
Total valid votes		15,031		
Registered electors		43,576		▼0.25
INC hold		Swing	▼13.79	

=== Assembly Election 1952 ===
1952 Mysore State Legislative Assembly election : Chamrajpet
Party	Candidate	Votes	%	±%
INC	R. Anantharaman	14,042	63.24	New
KMPP	B. V. Lankappa	3,512	15.82	New
Socialist Party (India)	B. S. Krishnamurthy	1,241	5.59	New
CPI	N. D. Shankar	1,181	5.32	New
ABJS	N. S. Narayana Rao	841	3.79	New
Independent	B. C. Rangappa	502	2.26	New
Independent	B. Venkata Rao	483	2.18	New
Independent	U. R. Ramachar	401	1.81	New
Margin of victory		10,530	47.43	
Turnout		22,203	50.82	
Total valid votes		22,203		
Registered electors		43,686		
INC win (new seat)				

== See also ==
- List of constituencies of Karnataka Legislative Assembly
