= Hindu Jagarana Vedike =

Indian Hindu right-wing activist group

- Parent organisation: Rashtriya Swayamsevak Sangh
- Affiliations: Sangh Parivar

Hindu Jagarana Vedike is a right wing Indian Hindu activist group affiliated to the Rashtriya Swayamsevak Sangh (RSS). It is National Volunteer Association for men to protect the Hindus. Its stated objective is "to organise, consolidate the Hindu society and to serve and protect. the Hindu Dharma The ideology of the organisation is based on Hindutva. The main task of this organisation is to stop atrocities against animals. It has many branches in different states of India. The HJV (Hindu Jagarana Vedike) is considered a member of the Sangh Parivar, an umbrella term for Hindu nationalist organisations led by the RSS.

The Hindu Jagarana Vedike was involved in the 2012 Mangalore homestay attack, where 50 activists of the outfit broke into a house and assaulted the people who were partying. They dragged the girls by their hair, beat them and molested them. Men were assaulted. The Human rights organisation, People's Union for Civil Liberties, reported Hindu Jagarana Vedike as one of the perpetrators of the 2021 anti-Christian violence in Karnataka.
