= Aladakatti =

- Village
- Location in Karnataka, India Aladakatti (India)
- Coordinates: 14°46′54″N 75°21′54″E
- Country: India
- State: Karnataka
- District: Dharwad

Government
  - Type: Panchayat raj
  - Body: Gram panchayat

Population (2011)
  - Total: 1,062

Languages
  - Official: Kannada
- Time zone: UTC+5:30 (IST)
- ISO 3166 code: IN-KA
- Vehicle registration: KA
- Website: karnataka.gov.in

Aladakatti is a village in Dharwad district of Karnataka, India.

== Demographics ==
As of the 2011 Census of India there were 229 households in Aladakatti and a total population of 1,062 consisting of 550 males and 512 females. There were 131 children ages 0-6.
