= Pramila Nesargi =

Indian politician

Pramila Nesargi (born 25 March 1938) is an Indian educationist and lawyer, a well-known women's rights activist and Director of several companies. Pramila Nesargi is known as a maverick lawyer with many distinctions to her credit. She obtained a law degree at an early age and started practicing law. She is first graduate in the family. She has been a member of the dictionary committee for English-Kannada translation. She is the first woman to be elected in the past 50 years to the Karnataka Bar Council as Chairman of Bar Association. She has represented a sweep of cases from the high-profile to the controversial for which she has often faced severe criticism.

== Early life and education ==
Pramila Nesargi was born on 25 March in the year 1938. She was born in Mysore, Karnataka. Her mother was a freedom fighter and her father was a self-made man. She is now settled in Bangalore. Pramila is the first person in the family went to the college. She completed her Bachelor of Science (B.Sc) in the year 1958, the LLB (Bachelor of Laws) degree in the year 1960, and a graduate degree in law in 1963. She has been the first lady to qualify M.L. (jurisprudence).

== Career ==
Pramila started her career when pursuing graduate program (M.L) by filing a writ against her lecturer who was only an under graduate (LLB) and was conducting graduate classes. She fights several sensational and sensitive cases. Her vision is to stand up for women and fight against injustices meted out to them. Lawyer profession was male profession a few decades back; she took up as a challenge to change the trend and succeeded in becoming a renowned lawyer. She fought against many ministers in controversial cases and was responsible to bring justice to many unfortunate. She fights against injustice, corruption and when the integrity of a public personality is questionable.

Pramila joined politics in the year 1978. She was first elected Lady Senate member (MLA), Karnataka Legislative assembly from Janatha party during the year 1978-1983. She contested and won from Chamrajpet constituency, Bangalore.

She also contested for parliament elections in the year 1991 from North Bangalore and lost to C. K. Jaffer Sharief. She was later elected as member of legislative assembly Karnataka from the year 1991-1994, in her second term she contested and won from Chamrajpet constituency, Bangalore. She was chairperson of Women's state commission in 2007. She was also President of India Women Lawyer, Karnataka State between 2007-2014.

Nesargi has suggested and submitted various reports to the Government of Karnataka and Government of India on sensitive issues such as child labor, house and rent control, sexual violence at work, domestic violence and prisoners plight. She has also raised voice in organizing various unincorporated sectors. She also suggested to amend various laws offending women in Hindu and Mohammedan Law. She recommended revision in Criminal Procedure law, Evidence act, Cyber act and Right to Information act. As a member of the Education Committee, she has provided suggestions and policies that have been widely accepted in the arena of technical education (engineering), medical education and general education. During her tenure in the education committee, she has attended various functions related to the respective universities. During her tenure as MLA, she had held different positions in various capacities in the Government. She heads Samragni Swa Udyog Trust; whose primary function is to uplift skill in all women and special children. Nesargi holds a very strong bond with the literary field - Kannada Sahitya Parishad. She has felicitated several literary figures of Karnataka.

== Books ==
- Commentary and House and Central Act of Karnataka

== Awards and honours ==
In August 2018, Power Brands awarded Pramila Nesargi the Bharatiya Manavata Vikas Puraskar for being one of India's most revered advocate-activists and a staunch negotiator for the law and all forms of legal reforms.
