= Apoorvanand =

Professor, Columnist and Commentator

Apoorvanand Jha
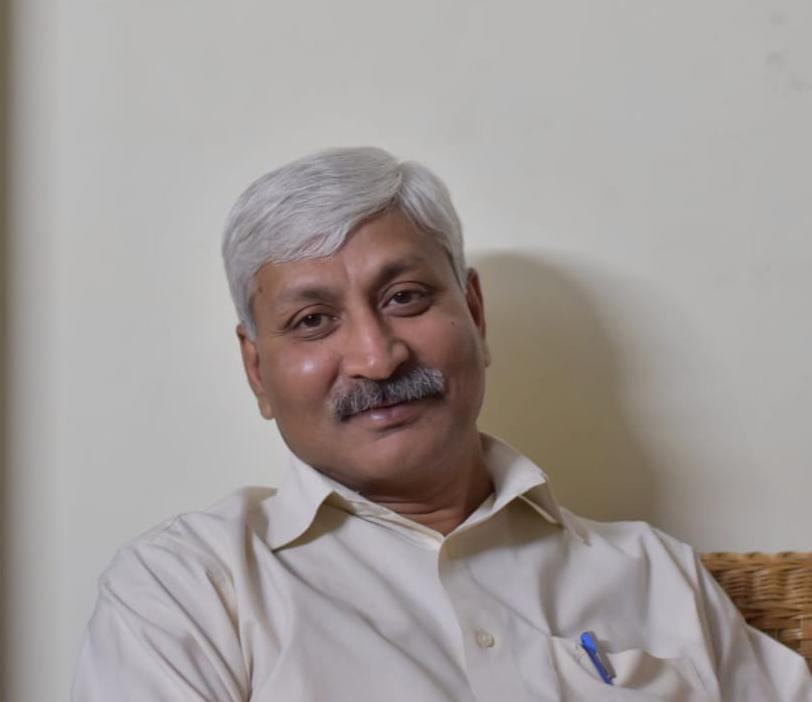

Personal details
- Born: Siwan, Bihar
- Education: Delhi University
- Profession: Professor

Apoorvanand Jha is professor at the Hindi Department, Faculty of Arts, University of Delhi. He has worked on Marxism in Hindi. He is also a regular columnist and political commentator.

== Early life and education ==
Apoorvanand was born in Muzaffarpur, Bihar, grew up in Siwan and received his undergraduate education from Bihar University. He earned his Masters and Ph.D. from Patna University. He currently teaches Hindi at University of Delhi.

== Academic career ==
Prof. Apoorvanand started his teaching career at T.P.S. College, Patna, a constituent unit of Magadh University. In 1999, he was invited to join Mahatma Gandhi Antarrashtriya Hindi Vishwavidyalaya, a Central University set up by the Government of India, and was instrumental in developing the University's vision plan and first academic programs. In 2004, he joined the Hindi Department at the University of Delhi where he was instrumental in redesigning the department's academic program.

== Published works ==
He had authored or edited the following books:

- Sundar Ka Swapna (New Delhi: Vani Prakashan, 2001)
- Sahitya Ka Ekant (New Delhi: Vani Prakashan, 2008)
- The Idea of a University (Chennai: Context, 2018)
- Education at the Crossroads (New Delhi: Niyogi Books, 2018)

== Political commentator ==
His critical essays have appeared in all major Hindi journals. Apart from his academic and literary writings, he also contributes columns in Indian Newspapers and magazines on the issues of education, culture, communalism, violence and human rights both in Hindi and also in English. He is a regular columnist at The Indian Express and The Wire. He also frequently writes on other platforms such as Scroll, Satya Hindi, Al Jazeera, The Kochi Post. He at times also appears on Indian television as a panelist on issues concerning Higher Education, language and communal-ism.

=== Views ===
==== NCERT history textbook revision ====
In his literary and cultural criticism articles featured on Al Jazeera, he expressed his disapproval of the alterations made in NCERT textbooks. He argued that the history of Islamic rule in India was being marginalized, despite its significant presence in school textbooks since Indian independence. Specifically, he highlighted the revised syllabus in CBSE schools, stating that the "legacy" of Islamic rulers in India was being erased from history textbooks. Apoorvanand claims that this revision, under the guise of "reducing the learning load on students", was actually a form of "cultural genocide". He emphasized that this revision was leading to the exclusion of important historical events, such as the 2002 Gujarat riots, the assassination of Gandhi by Nathuram Godse, instances of untouchability, and the caste system. He believed that this omission would hinder children's understanding of national history by concealing crucial truths and presenting India as a nation devoid of discrimination and violence.

== Controversies ==
On 12 September 2020, he along with Sitaram Yechuri, Yogendra Yadav and others was named in the supplementary chargesheet by Delhi Police for his alleged role in 2020 Delhi riots, as having taken part in anti-CAA demonstrations to "provoke and mobilise" crowds.
