= Mumtaz Ali Khan (politician) =

Indian politician (died 2021)

Mumtaz Ali Khan (1926/1927 – 7 June 2021) was a cabinet minister in the Bharatiya Janata Party ministry of Karnataka state of India. He was Minister for Haj, Wakf and Minority welfare. He was a professor of Sociology and headed the party's minority wing in Karnataka. He quit the Bharatiya Janata Party and joined the Congress party in 2013.

Khan died at his residence in Bengaluru on 7 June 2021. He was 94 years of age.
