= Vatal Nagaraj =

Indian politician

- Vatal Nagaraj in 2024.

Member of the Karnataka Legislative Assembly
- In office 2004–2008
- Constituency: Chamarajanagar

Member of the Karnataka Legislative Assembly
- In office 1989–1999
- Constituency: Chamarajanagar

Member of the Karnataka Legislative Assembly
- In office 1972 – 1974 (election annulled)
- Constituency: Chamrajpet

Personal details
- Born: Vatalu, T. Narasipura taluk, Mysuru district, Karnataka, India
- Party: Kannada Chalavali Vatal Paksha
- Occupation: Kannada-language activist and Politician

Vatal Nagaraj is an Indian politician and Kannada language activist in Karnataka. He is the founder and leader of the Kannada Chalavali Vatal Paksha and has campaigned on issues including Kannada-language rights, regional identity and interstate river-water sharing. He was elected to the Karnataka Legislative Assembly from Chamarajanagar Assembly constituency in 1989, 1994 and 2004. He had earlier won the Chamrajpet seat in 1972, although that election was subsequently annulled by the courts.

Nagaraj is also known for his unconventional forms of protest and for his public appearance in a bucket hat and dark sunglasses.

== Early Life and Kannada-language Activism ==
Nagaraj was born in Vatalu village, in Thirumakudalu Narasipura taluk of the Mysore district, and moved to Bengaluru at a young age. In a 2023 interview, he recalled taking part in demonstrations against the screening of Hindi-language films in Bengaluru in 1962. Accounts of his age and year of birth have differed, and Nagaraj told The Indian Express in 2023 that he was uncertain of his exact age.

Nagaraj was involved in a 1964 campaign to remove a British-era military cenotaph in Bengaluru. The memorial was subsequently replaced by a statue of the city's founder Kempe Gowda.

He participated in the Gokak agitation of the early 1980s, which sought priority for the Kannada as the first language taught in Karnataka schools. The movement also involved writers and public figures, including film actor Dr. Rajkumar.

== Political Career ==
=== Legislative Assembly Elections ===
Nagaraj was elected to the Karnataka Legislative Assembly as an independent candidate from Chamrajpet in 1972. His election was challenged by Congress candidate R. Dayanand Sagar. The Karnataka High Court set aside the election; on 11 October 1974, the Supreme Court of India upheld the annulment on the ground that statutory election-expenditure limits had been exceeded. The Supreme Court also reversed the High Court's separate declaration that Sagar should be elected in Nagaraj's place.

Nagaraj contested Chamarajanagar as an independent in 1983 but lost to S. Puttaswamy. He won the constituency as an independent in 1989, then as a candidate of the Kannada Chalavali Vatal Paksha, the party he founded, in 1994. In 1999 he lost to Bharatiya Janata Party candidate C. Guruswamy. He regained the seat in 2004 and served until 2008.

Nagaraj later contested other elections, including the Bangalore South Lok Sabha constituency and a 2019 by-election for the Mahalakshmi Layout Assembly constituency, without being elected.

=== Border-area Commission and Legislative Council Election Dispute ===
On 18 April 2000, the Karnataka Government appointed Nagaraj to head a one-person commission examining the problems of Kannada speakers in border regions adjoining Keralam, Maharashtra, Andhra Pradesh, Goa and Tamil Nadu. His chairmanship was subsequently accorded the status of a cabinet-rank minister. When he sought to contest a Karnataka Legislative Council election later that year, the returning officer rejected his nomination on the ground that he held an office of profit. Although the Karnataka High Court found in his favour, the Supreme Court reversed that decision on 23 January 2002 and upheld the rejection.

== Protests and Public Campaigns ==
Nagaraj has been involved in campaigns concerning the Kaveri River water dispute between Karnataka and Tamil Nadu. In September 2016, he participated in protests following a Supreme Court direction on the release of Kaveri water. He was also involved in a September 2023 statewide shutdown call over the same dispute.

In April 2017, Kannada organisations led by Nagaraj threatened the Karnataka release of the film Baahubali 2: The Conclusion over remarks that actor Sathyaraj had made during an earlier Kaveri controversy. Nagaraj withdrew the protest after Sathyaraj expressed regret for the remarks.

In January 2018, he supported calls for a Karnataka shutdown over the Mahadayi river water-sharing dispute involving Karnataka and Goa. In March 2025, as a leader of Kannada Okkoota, an umbrella grouping of Kannada organisations, he called for a statewide bandh following a dispute involving a Karnataka state transport conductor in Belagavi and language-related tensions.

In August 2026, Nagaraj called for a blockade of the Karnataka-Tamil Nadu border at Attibele in connection with Kaveri water-sharing demands and proposed projects including Mekedatu.

== Public Image and Protest Style ==
Nagaraj's manner of protest has been a recurring subject of Kannada pop-culture discussions. He frequently appears in public wearing a dark bucket hat and sunglasses. His demonstrations have used symbolic performances, unusual costumes and objects to attract public attention to issues such as language policy, rising prices and water availability.

The methods have included bullock-cart processions, appearances with donkeys, and mock ceremonies. During the September 2023 Kaveri protests, he appeared wearing a Burqa and carrying an empty pot; he said the clothing represented justice and the pot symbolised water scarcity. In April 2025, he ceremonially draped a shawl over a donkey during a demonstration against price rise.

Nagaraj has also attracted attention for a different form of public campaigning around Valentine's Day. In 2009, amid threats against couples, he travelled in Bengaluru on a horse-drawn chariot and said that he would act as a protector of couples celebrating the occasion.

His protests also received criticism doubting whether they resulted in any meaningful resolutions to the issues.

== Recognition ==
In May 2014, Kannada writer and Jnanpith Award recipient Chandrashekhara Kambara presented Nagaraj with the "Kengal Hanumanthaiah Memorial Award" at a felicitation held at Kannada Sahitya Parishat in Bengaluru.

In September 2014, Karnataka's Department of Kannada and Culture announced that Nagaraj had been selected for the 2013 Sangolli Rayanna Award for his campaigns related to Karnataka's interests.

In October 2026, Kannada and Culture Minister Shivaraj Tangadagi said that Nagaraj had been considered for the year's Rajyotsava Award but declined, asking instead for government support for work promoting Kannada. The refusal was also mentioned at the November 2026 awards ceremony.
