= Bilkis Bano (politician) =

Indian politician

Member of the Karnataka Legislative Council
- Incumbent
- Assumed office 17 June 2024
- Constituency: elected by MLAs

Personal details
- Born: Bhadravati, Karnataka
- Party: Indian National Congress

Bilkis Bano is an Indian politician and a member of the Karnataka Legislative Council since June 2024 as a representative of Indian National Congress. She is the general secretary of Karnataka Pradesh Congress Committee and known as the close associate of B.K. Sangameshwara, Incumbent Member of the Karnataka Legislative Assembly from Bhadravati Assembly constituency. She has also served as a chairperson for the Minorities Development Corporation for 18 months.

== Biography ==
Bano hails from Bhadravati in Shimoga district of Karnataka. She had joined Indian National Congress in 1982 as a student and was elected to the Zila Parishad in 1986 and re-elected in 1992 for the second term. She was a Member of Minorities Development Corporation from 2013 to 2016 and later served as the chairman for 18 months.
