= Kannada Chalavali Vatal Paksha =

- Abbreviation: KCVP
- President: Vatal Nagaraj
- Founder: Vatal Nagaraj
- Founded: 11 April 1994 (32 years ago)
- Headquarters: Bangalore, Karnataka, India
- ECI Status: Registered party

The Kannada Chalavali Vatal Paksha, which the literally means, Kannada Movement Vatal Party and abbreviated as the, KCVP, is an Indian state political party in the Karnataka. this party led by Vatal Nagaraj.

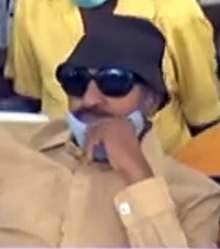
Party president Vatal Nagaraj in 2020
