= Bengaluru =

Capital of Karnataka, India

Bengaluru Beṅgaḷūru Bangalore
- Metropolis
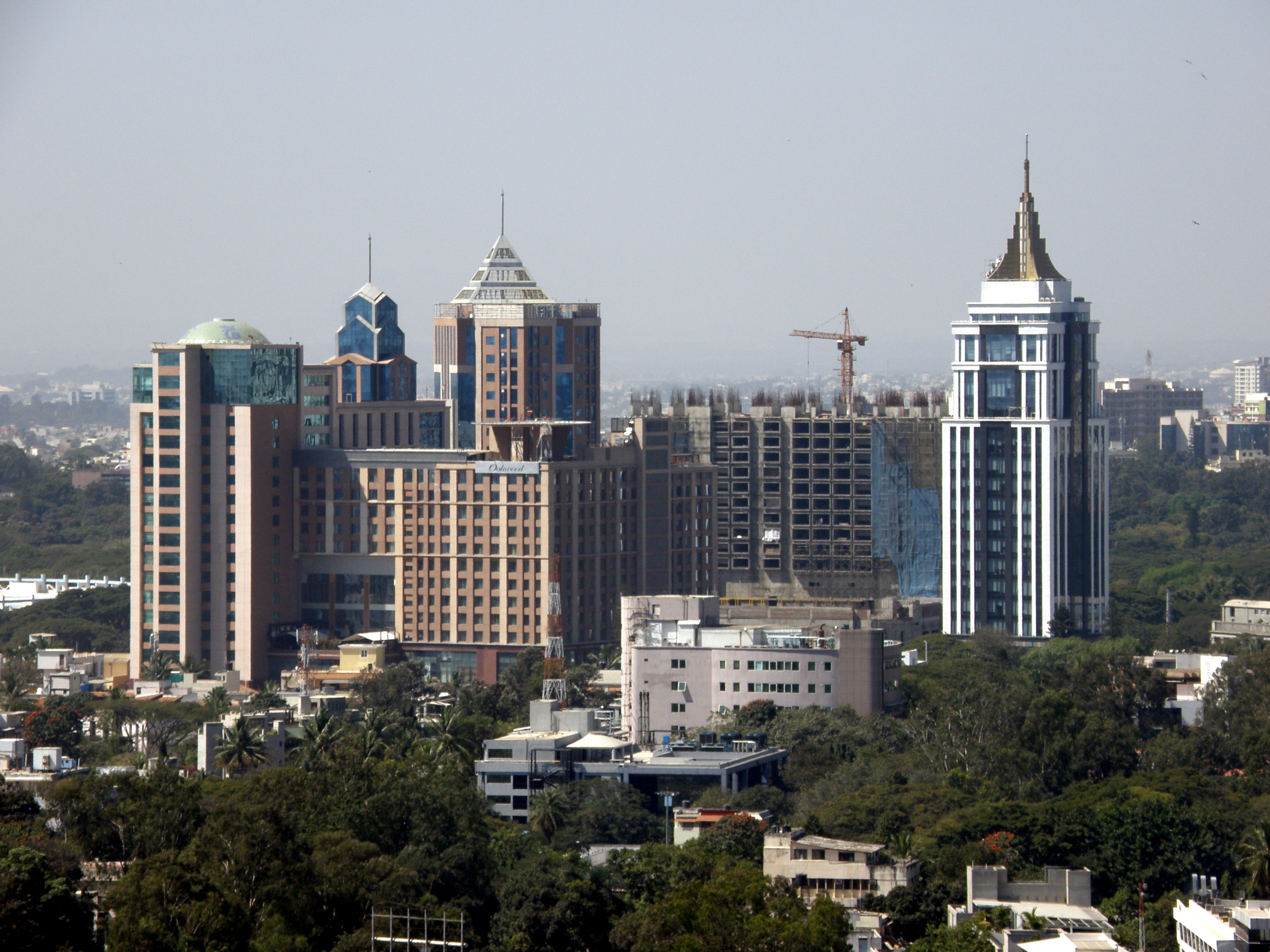
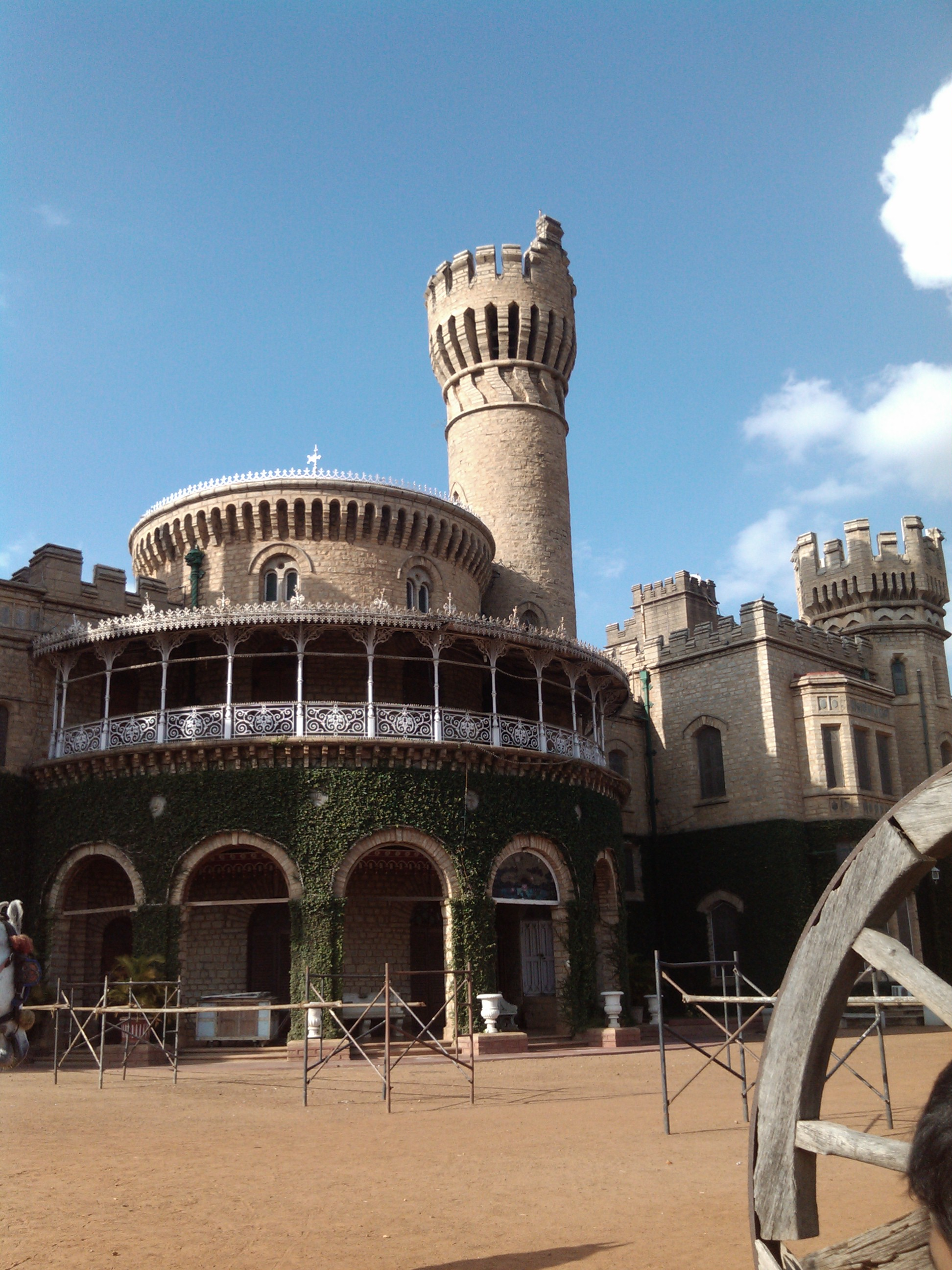
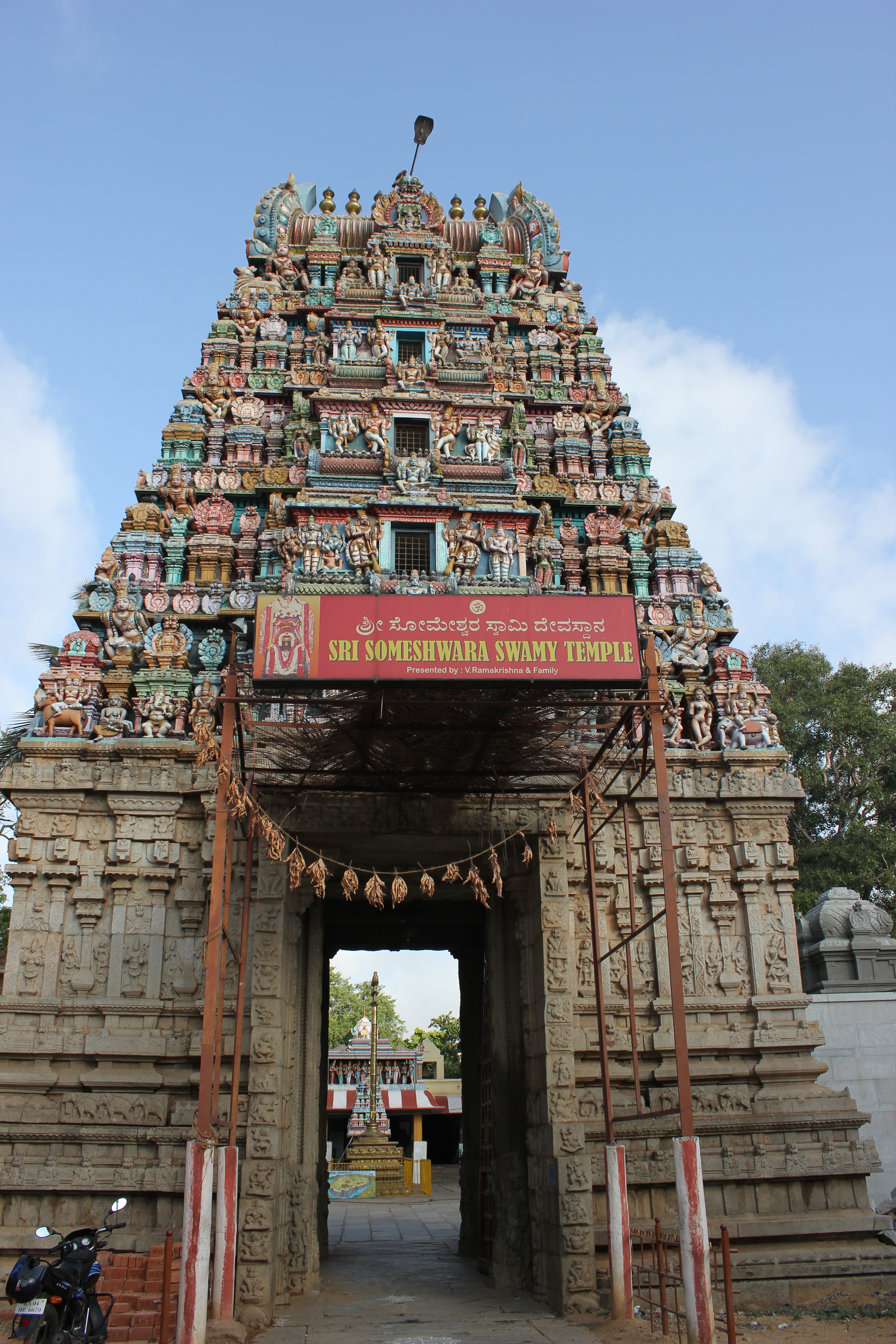
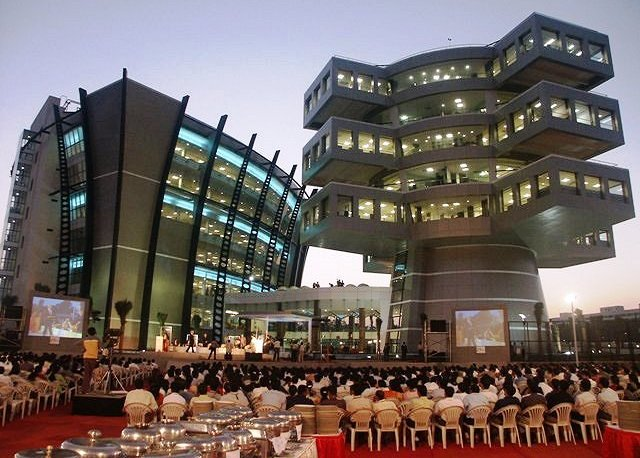
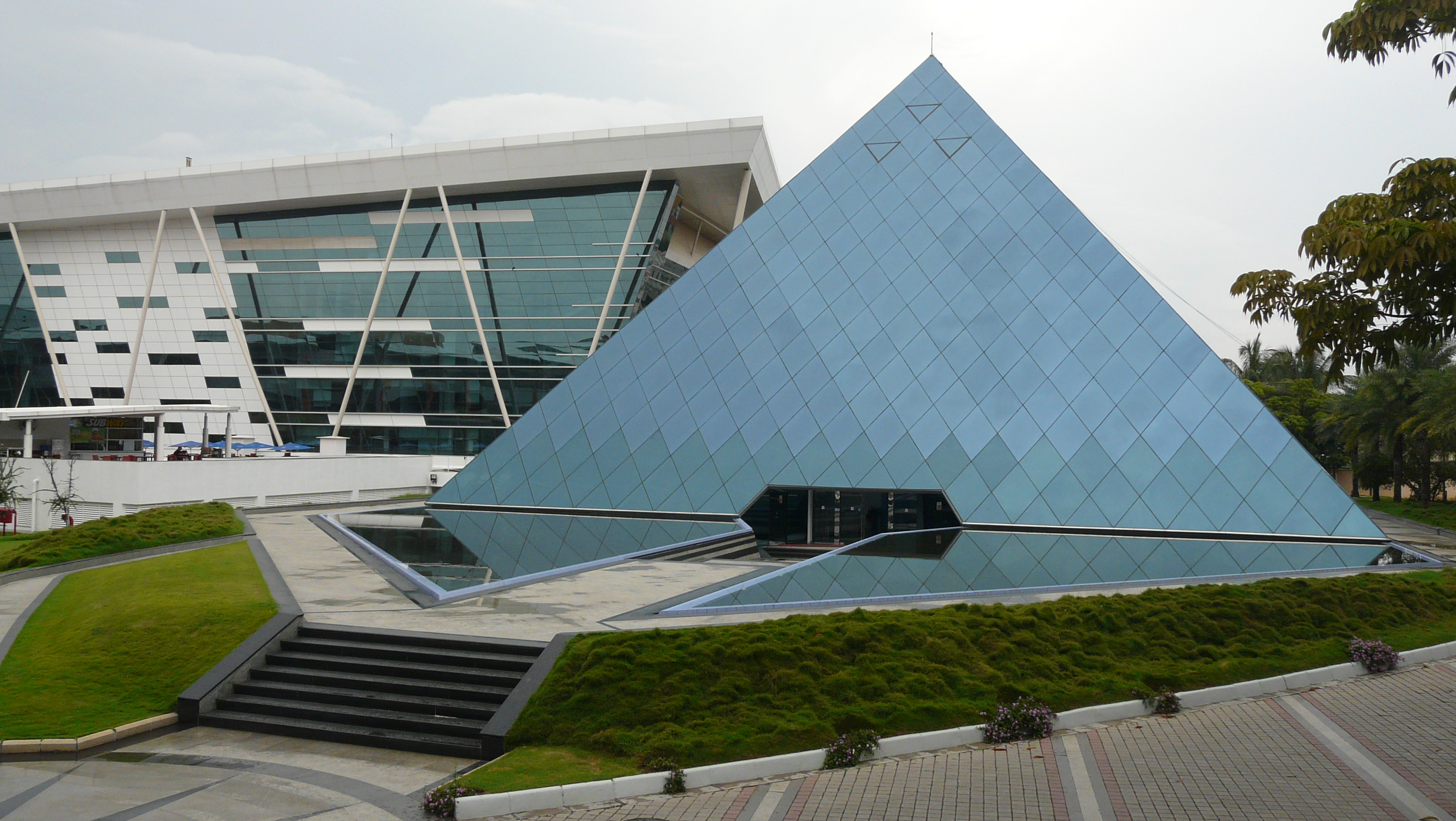
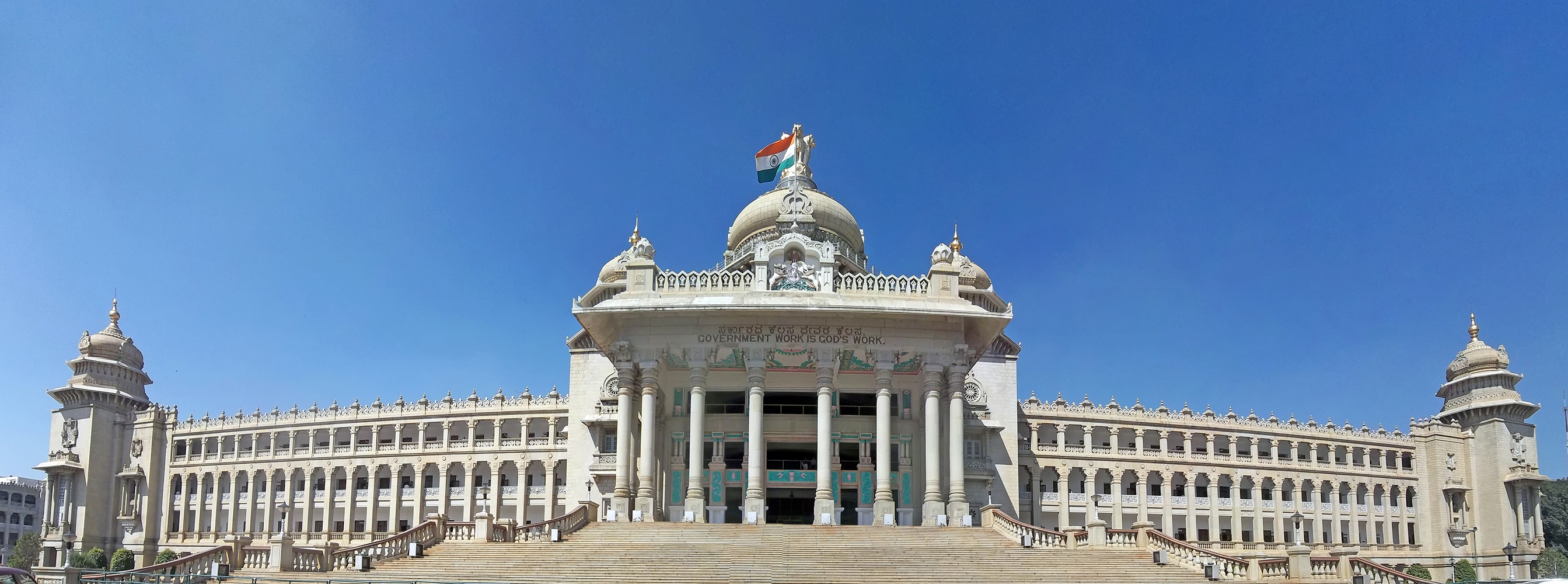
- Skyline of UB City, the main Central Business District of Bengaluru Dharmaraya Swamy Temple Bengaluru Palace Halasuru Someshwara Temple Bagmane Tech Park Infosys pyramid Vidhana Soudha
- Nicknames: Silicon Valley of India, IT Capital of India, Garden City of India
- Interactive map of Bengaluru
- Location within India Location within Karnataka Location within South Asia Location within Asia
- Coordinates: 12°58′44″N 77°35′30″E
- Country: India
- State: Karnataka
- Districts: Bengaluru Urban
- Established: 1537
- Founder: Kempe Gowda I

Government
  - Type: Municipal Corporation
  - Body: List: Bengaluru Central City Corporation; Bengaluru North City Corporation; Bengaluru South City Corporation; Bengaluru East City Corporation; Bengaluru West City Corporation; (Note: The Greater Bengaluru Governance Bill, 2024 provided for the division of the former Bruhat Bengaluru Mahanagara Palike into up to seven city corporations, each of which will be responsible for providing basic civic services within its respective jurisdiction. In July 2025, the Government of Karnataka notified the setting up of five municipal corporations, which are coordinated by the Greater Bengaluru Authority.)
  - Chief Commissioner: Maheshwar Rao, IAS

Area
  - Metropolis: 741 km^{2} (286 sq mi)
  - Metro: 8,005 km^{2} (3,091 sq mi)
- Elevation: 920 m (3,020 ft)

Population (2011)
  - Metropolis: 8,443,675
  - Rank: 3rd
  - Density: 11,400/km^{2} (29,500/sq mi)
  - Urban: 10,456,000
  - Rank: 5th
- Demonyms: Bengalurinavaru; Bengalurean
- Time zone: UTC+05:30 (IST)
- Pincode(s): 560 xxx
- Area code: +91-(0)80
- Vehicle registration: KA:01-05, 41, 50-53, 57-61
- GDP (PPP): ▲$590.4 billion (2024 est.)
- Official language: Kannada
- Website: bbmp.gov.in

Bengaluru, (Note: ISO: Beṅgaḷūru) also known as Bangalore (its official name until 1 November 2014), is the capital and largest city of the southern Indian state of Karnataka. As per the 2011 census, the city had a population of 8.4 million, making it the third most populous city in India and the most populous in South India. The Bengaluru metropolitan area had a population of around 8.5 million, making it the fifth most populous urban agglomeration in the country. It is located towards the southern end of the Deccan Plateau, at an altitude of 900 m (3,000 ft) above sea level. The city is known as India's "Garden City", due to its parks and greenery.

Archaeological artefacts indicate that the human settlement in the region happened as early as 4000 BCE. The first mention of the name "Bengaluru" is from an old Kannada stone inscription from 890 CE found at the Nageshwara Temple in Begur. The region was ruled by the Western Ganga dynasty since 350 CE, and became part of the Chola Empire in the early eleventh century CE. In the late Middle Ages, it formed a part of the Hoysala kingdom and then the Vijayanagara Empire. In 1537 CE, Kempe Gowda I, a feudal ruler under the Vijayanagara Empire, established a mud fort which is considered the foundation of the modern city of Bengaluru with the earlier established areas (petes) still in existence. After the fall of the Vijayanagara Empire, Kempe Gowda declared independence, and the city was expanded by his successors. In 1638 CE, an Adil Shahi army defeated Kempe Gowda III, and the city became a jagir (feudal estate) of Shahaji. The Mughals later captured the city and sold it to Chikka Devaraja Wodeyar, the Maharaja of the Kingdom of Mysore. After the death of Krishnaraja Wodeyar II in 1759 CE, Hyder Ali seized control of the kingdom and with it, the administration of Bengaluru, which passed subsequently to his son, Tipu Sultan.

The city was captured by the British East India Company during the Anglo-Mysore Wars, and became part of the princely state of Mysore. The administrative control of the city was returned to Krishnaraja Wodeyar III, then Maharaja of Mysore, and the old city re-developed under the dominion of the Mysore kingdom. In 1809 CE, the British formed a military garrison in the city and established the cantonment outside the old city. In the late 19th century CE, the city was composed of two distinct urban settlements, the old Pete and the new Cantonment. Following India's independence in 1947, Bengaluru became the capital of Mysore State, and remained the capital when the state was enlarged and unified in 1956 and subsequently renamed as Karnataka in 1973. The two urban settlements which had developed as independent entities, merged under a single urban administration in 1949.

Bengaluru is one of the fastest-growing metropolises in India. As of 2024, the metropolitan area had an estimated GDP of $590.4 billion, and is one of the most productive metro areas of India. The city is a major centre for information technology (IT), and is consistently ranked amongst the world's fastest growing technology hubs. As the largest hub and exporter of IT services in the country, it is regarded as the "Silicon Valley of India". Manufacturing is a major contributor to the economy with the city home to several state-owned units. The city also hosts several prominent institutes of higher education and of national importance.

== Etymology ==
The earliest known reference to the name "Bengaluru" was on a ninth-century hero stone or vīra gallu found in Begur. The Old Kannada inscription belonging to the Western Ganga dynasty mentions the place in a battle in 890 CE. However, Kempe Gowda I used the name of a village near Kodigehalli, to name the city as Bengaluru during its foundation in 1537 CE. Bangalore is an anglicised version of the city's Kannada name. The city was also referred to as "Kalyānapura" or "Kalyānapuri" ("Auspicious City") and "Dēvarāyapattana" during the later Vijayanagara Empire period in 16th century CE.

An apocryphal story states that the twelfth-century Hoysala king Veera Ballala II, while on a hunting expedition, lost his way in the forest. Tired and hungry, he came across a poor old woman who served him boiled beans. The grateful king named the place "Benda-Kaal-uru" (literally, "town of boiled beans"), which eventually evolved into "Bengalūru". Suryanath Kamath has hypothesised that the name was derived from benga, the Kannada term for Pterocarpus marsupium (also known as the Indian Kino Tree), a species of dry and moist deciduous trees that grows abundantly in the region. Other theories include that the city was called as "Venkaturu" because of the Venkataramana temples built by Kempe Gowda, and "Benacha kalluru" because of the abundance of quartz stones ("benachu kallu" in Kannada) in the region.

On 11 December 2005, the Government of Karnataka accepted a proposal by U. R. Ananthamurthy to officially rename the city from Bangalore to Bengaluru. On 27 September 2006, the Bruhat Bengaluru Mahanagara Palike passed a resolution to implement the name change, and the government of Karnataka officially implemented the name change from 1 November 2014 after the Union government approved the request.

== History ==
=== Early and Middle Ages ===
Stone Age artefacts discovered at Jālahalli, Sidhapura and Jadigenahalli on Bengaluru's outskirts indicate human settlement around 4000 BCE. Iron Age tools and burial mounds from around 800 BCE, have been found in Koramangala and Chikkajāla. Coins of the Roman emperors Augustus, Tiberius, Claudius, and Caligula found at Yeswanthpur and HAL indicate the involvement of the region in trans-oceanic trade with the Romans and other civilisations in the first century CE.

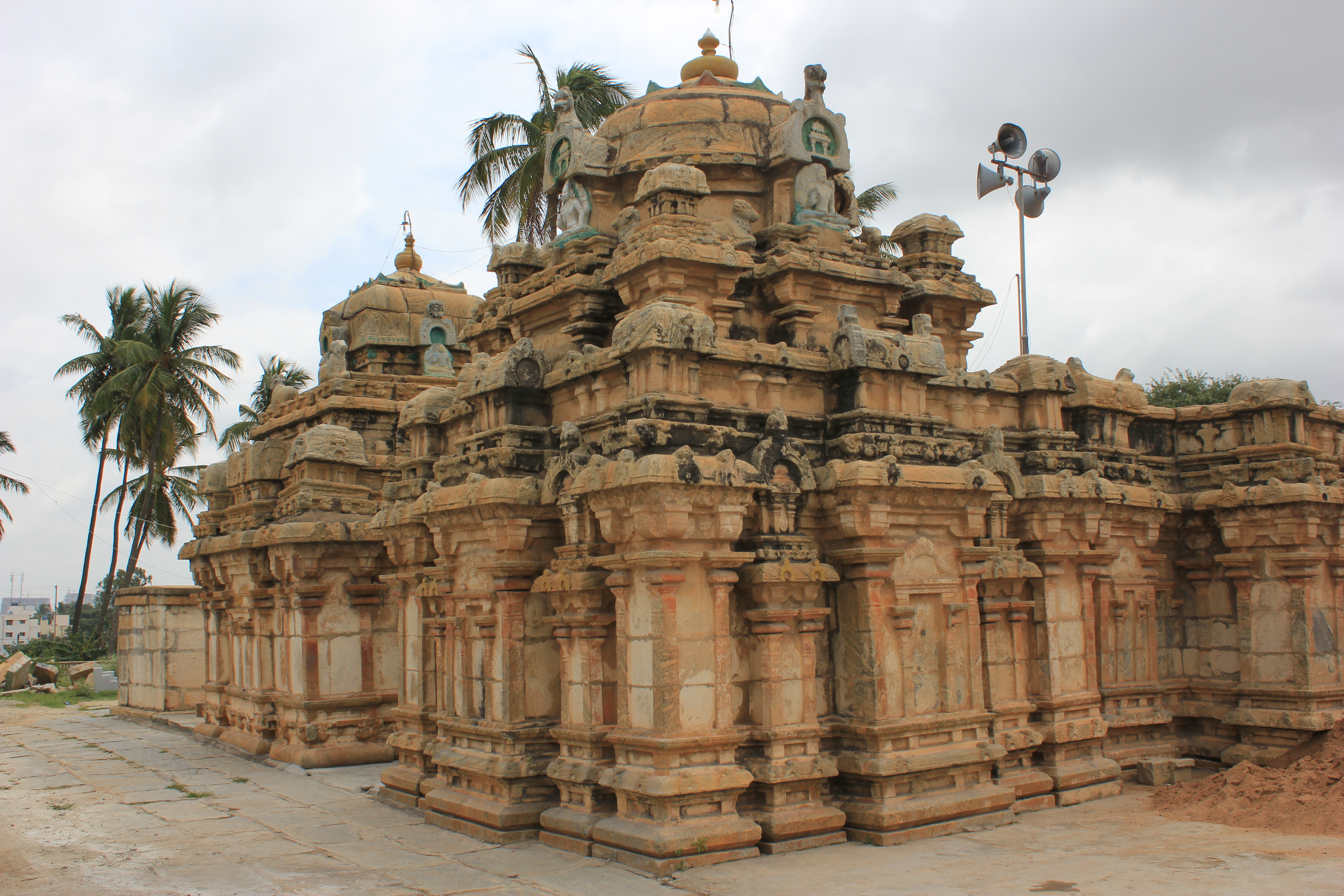
Begur Nageshwara Temple was built around c. 860, during the reign of the Western Ganga dynasty.

The region of modern-day Bengaluru was part of several successive South Indian kingdoms. Between the fourth and tenth centuries CE, the region was ruled by the Western Ganga dynasty, the first dynasty to set up effective control over the region. According to Edgar Thurston, twenty-eight kings ruled Gangavadi from the start of the Common Era until its conquest by the Cholas in the early eleventh century CE. The Western Gangas ruled as a sovereign power from 350 to 550 CE, and as feudatories of the Chalukyas of Badami, and later the Rashtrakutas until the tenth century. The Begur Nageshwara Temple was commissioned around 860 CE, during the reign of the Western Ganga King Ereganga Nitimarga I, and extended by his successor Nitimarga II. Around 1004 CE, during the reign of Raja Raja Chola I, the Cholas defeated the Western Gangas under the command of the crown prince Rajendra Chola I, and captured the region. During this period, the region witnessed the migration of many groups—warriors, administrators, traders, artisans, pastorals, cultivators, and religious personnel from the Southern Tamil speaking regions and other Kannada-speaking parts of the region. The Cholas built many temples in the region including the Chokkanathaswamy temple, Mukthi Natheshwara Temple, Choleshwara Temple, and Someshwara Temple.

In 1117, the Hoysala king Vishnuvardhana defeated the Cholas in the Battle of Talakad in south Karnataka, and extended his rule over the region. In the later part of the 13th century CE, Bengaluru was a source of contention between two warring cousins, the Hoysala ruler Veera Ballala III of Halebidu and Ramanatha, who administered the Hoysala held territory in the southern Tamil speaking regions. Veera Ballala appointed a civic head at Hudi (suburb of the city) to administer the region, and promoted the village to the status of a town. After Veera Ballala's death in 1343, the region came under Vijayanagara empire, which saw the rule of four consecutive dynasties – Sangamas (1336–1485), Saluvas (1485–1491), Tuluvas (1491–1565), and Aravidu (1565–1646). In the early 16th century CE, Achyuta Deva Raya built a dam across the Arkavati river near Hesaraghatta, whose reservoir was used to supply water to the region.

=== Foundation and early modern history ===
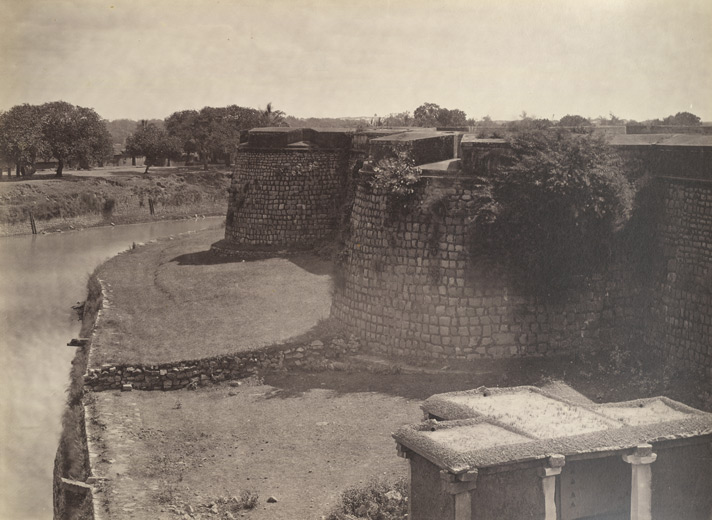
Bangalore Fort in 1860 CE showing fortifications and barracks. The fort was originally built by Kempe Gowda I as a mud fort in 1537 CE.

The city proper was established in 1537 CE by Kempe Gowda I, a local governor and chieftain aligned with the Vijayanagara Empire under emperor Achyuta Deva Raya. He led a campaign against Gangaraja, whom he defeated and expelled to Kanchi, and built a mud-brick fort at the site, which later became the central part of the modern city of Bengaluru. Kempe Gowda referred to the new town as his "Gandubhūmi" ("Land of Heroes"). Within the fort, the town was divided into smaller divisions, each called a pētē (Kannada pronunciation: [peːteː]). The town had two main streets Chickpet and Doddapete, which intersected to form the Doddapete Square in the heart of the town. Kempe Gowda also built the temple at Basavanagudi, and expanded other temples. He also constructed various tanks such as Kempambudhi, Dharmambudhi, and Sampangi for water storage. Vijayanagara literature refers to the city by various names such as "Devarāyanagara" and "Kalyānapura" or "Kalyānapuri" ("auspicious city").

After the fall of the Vijayanagara Empire in 1565 CE in the Battle of Talikota, Kempe Gowda declared independence. His successor, Kempe Gowda II, built four towers to mark the boundary of the town. In 1638 CE, a Adil Shahi army led by Ranadulla Khan and Shahaji Bhonsle (father of Shivaji) defeated Kempe Gowda III, and the region became a jagir (feudal estate) of Shahaji. In 1639 CE, Shahaji ordered the reconstruction of the town and built large fortifications, and new reservoirs to solve the water shortage in the region. In 1687 CE, Mughal general Kasim Khan, under orders from Aurangzeb, defeated Ekoji I, the son of Shahaji, and leased the town to Chikkadevaraja Wodeyar (1673–1704 CE), the then ruler of the Kingdom of Mysore. After the death of Krishnaraja Wodeyar II in 1759 CE, Hyder Ali, Commander-in-Chief of the Mysore Army, proclaimed himself the ruler of the Mysore kingdom. He built the Delhi and Mysore gates at the northern and southern ends of the city in 1760 CE. The kingdom later passed to Hyder Ali's son Tipu Sultan, and the Lal Bagh garden was established around 1760 CE. During the period, the city developed into a commercial and military centre of strategic importance.

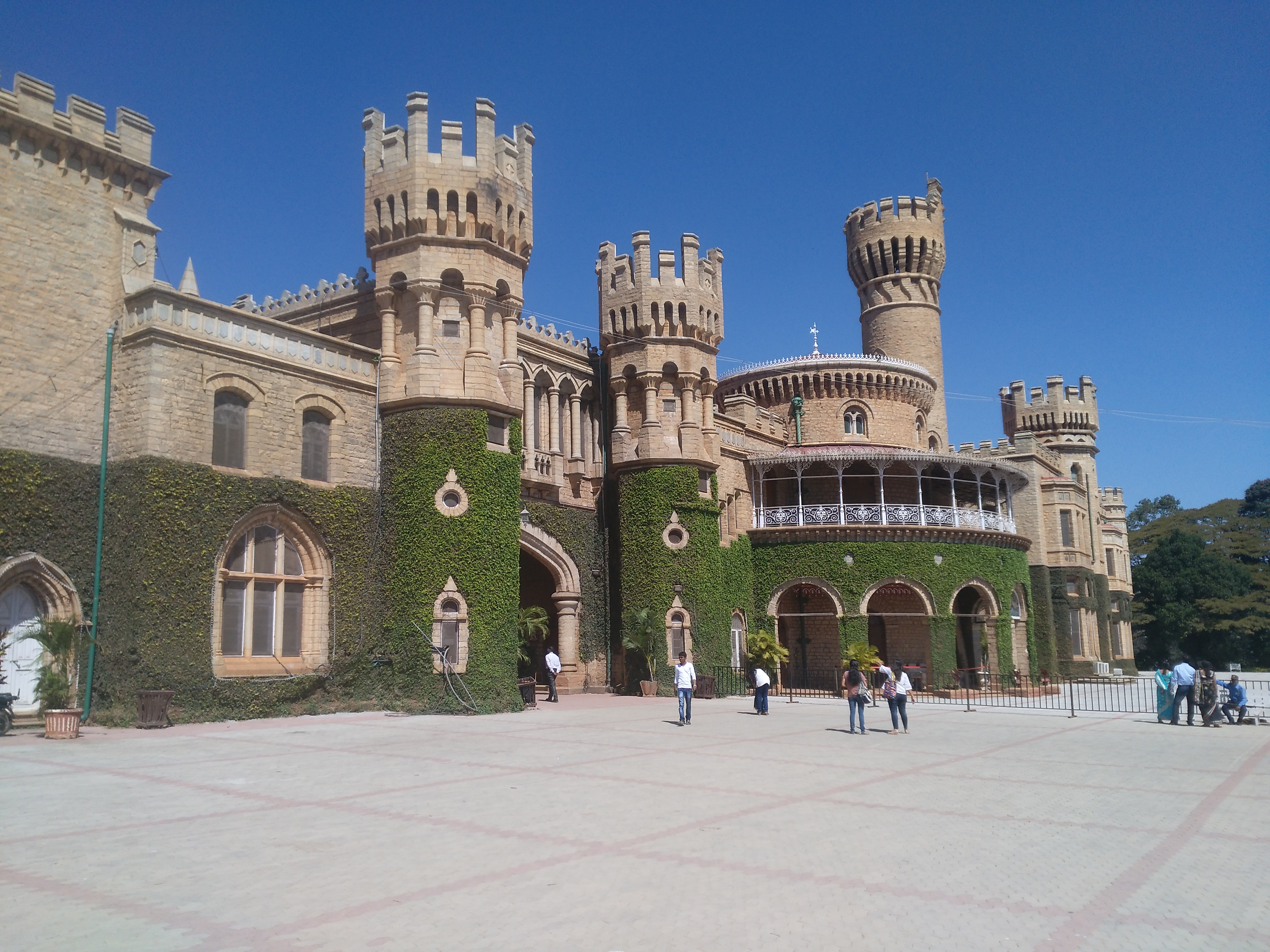
Bengaluru Palace, built in 1887 in Tudor architectural style was modelled on Windsor Castle in England.

The Bengaluru fort was captured by British forces under Charles Cornwallis on 21 March 1791 during the Third Anglo-Mysore War and became the centre for British resistance against Tipu. Following Tipu's death in the Fourth Anglo-Mysore War (1799 CE), the Bengaluru Pete was incorporated into the Princely State of Mysore, whose administrative control remained with the Maharaja of Mysore. The city was further developed by the Maharaja of Mysore. The Residency of Mysore State, established in Mysore in 1799 was shifted to Bengaluru in 1804. It was abolished in 1843 before being revived in 1881 and served till the Indian independence in 1947. The British found the city as an appropriate place to station its garrison and therefore it was moved in 1809 from Seringapatam to Ulsoor, about 6 km (4 mi) northeast of the original Pete. A town grew up around the surroundings by absorbing several villages in the area, and came to be known as Bengaluru cantonment. The new centre had its own municipal and administrative apparatus, though technically it was a British enclave within the territory of the princely state of Mysore. Further developments such as the introduction of telegraph connections to other major Indian cities in 1853 and a rail connection to Madras in 1864, contributed to the economic growth of the city.

=== Later modern and contemporary history ===
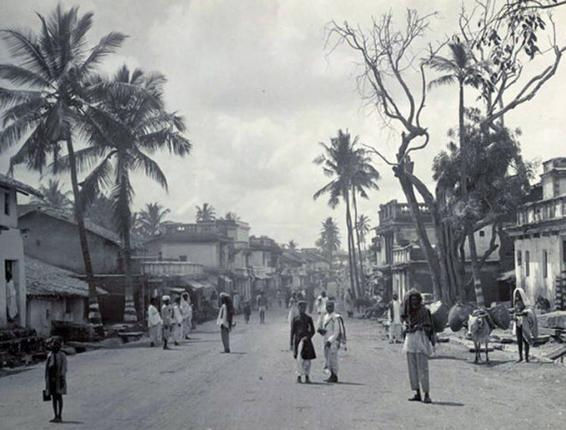
A view of Bengaluru Pete during the 1890s

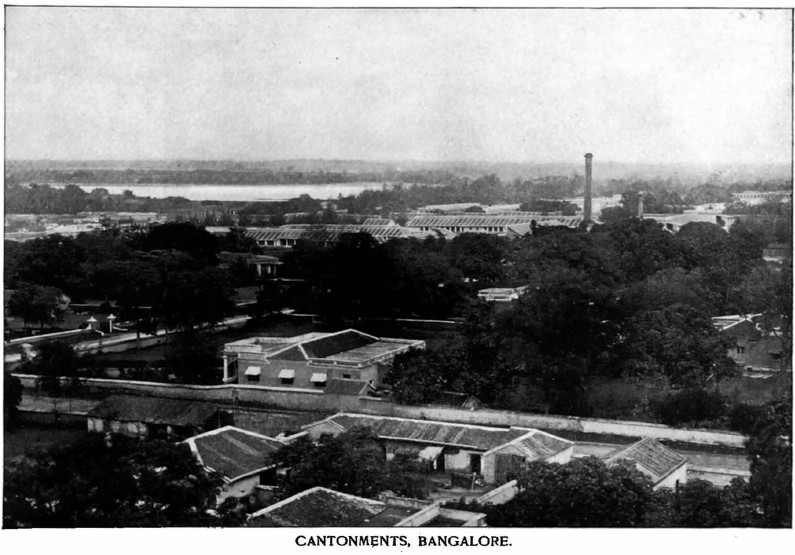
A view of Bangalore Cantonment, c. 1895

In the late 19th century CE, Bengaluru was essentially composed of two cities, with the Pete, whose residents were predominantly Kannadigas and the Cantonment created by the British, whose residents were predominantly Tamils and English people. Throughout the 19th century, the Cantonment, which was known as the Civil and Military Station of Bangalore, gradually expanded and acquired a distinct cultural and political salience. It had a large military presence and a cosmopolitan civilian population that came from outside the state of Mysore. The British developed the infrastructure of the city, widened roads, and established new settlements. The city was divided into eight wards in 1862, and was expanding. The first exclusive residential area was established in Chamarajpet in 1892, and a new wholesale market was established in Tharagupet in 1895. The city was hit by a plague epidemic in 1898 that claimed nearly 3,500 lives. The crisis caused by the outbreak led to the improvement in sanitation facilities, and establishment of new communication lines to co-ordinate anti-plague operations. Regulations for building new houses with proper sanitation facilities came into effect, a health officer was appointed, and the city was divided into four wards for better co-ordination. New extensions in Malleshwaram and Basavanagudi were developed in the north and south of the Pete.

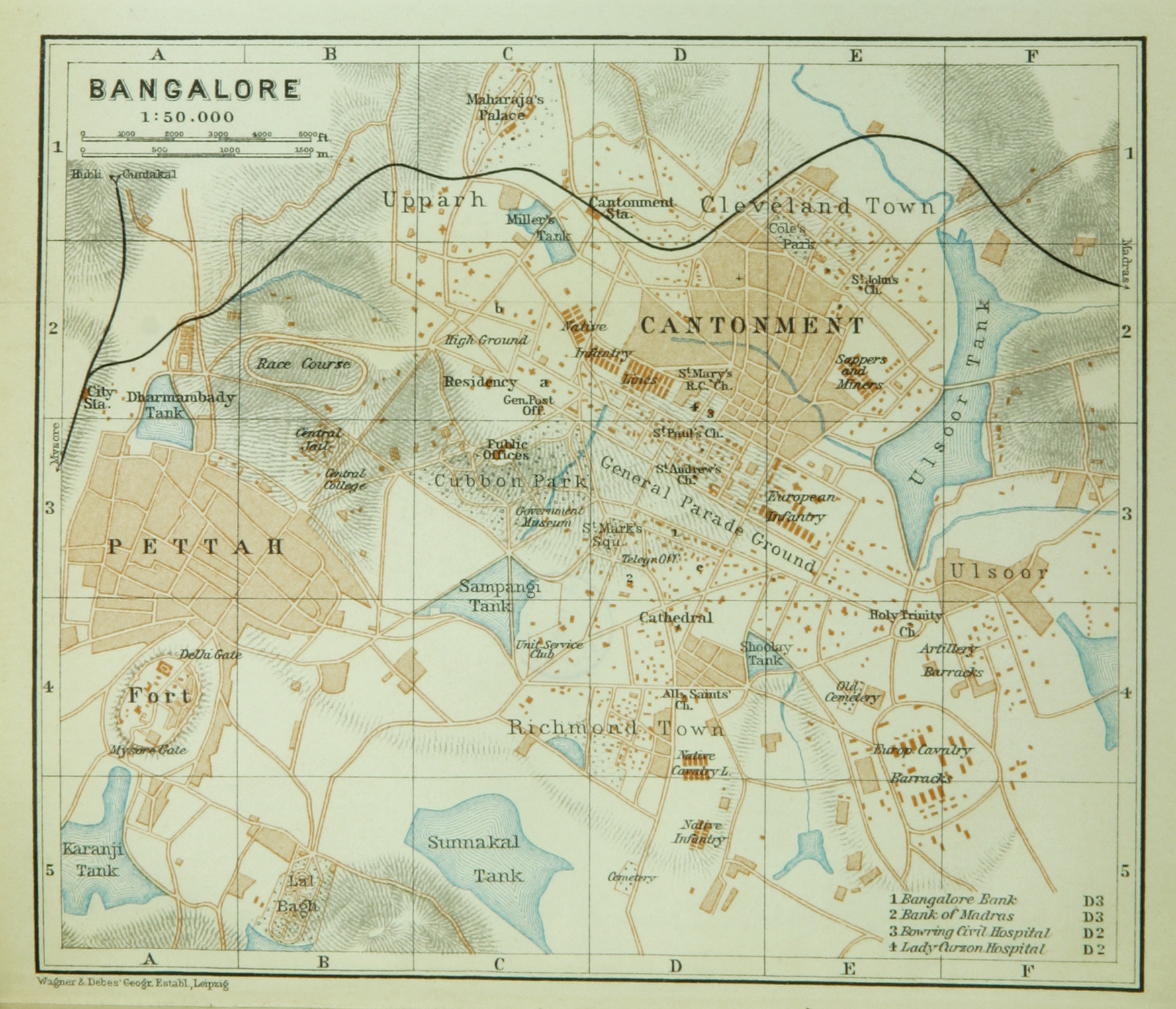
Map of the city and environs, c. 1914

In 1906, Bengaluru became one of the first cities in India to have electricity. In 1912, the Bangalore torpedo, an explosive weapon used in World War I and World War II, was devised in Bengaluru by British army officer Captain McClintock of the Madras Sappers and Miners. Bengaluru's reputation as the "Garden City of India" began in 1927 with the silver jubilee celebrations of the rule of Krishnaraja Wodeyar IV. Several projects such as the construction of parks, public buildings and hospitals were instituted to improve the city. Bengaluru played an important role during the Indian independence movement. Mahatma Gandhi visited the city in 1927 and 1934 and addressed public meetings here. In 1926, the labour unrest in Binny Mills due to demand by textile workers for payment of bonus resulted in a baton charge and police firing, resulting in the death of four workers, and several injuries. In July 1928, there were notable communal disturbances in Bengaluru, like when a Ganesh idol was removed from a school compound in the Sultanpet area of Bengaluru. In 1940, the first flight between Bengaluru and Mumbai took off, which placed the city on India's urban map.

After India's independence in August 1947, Bengaluru remained in the newly carved Mysore State of which the Maharaja of Mysore was the Rajapramukh (appointed governor). The "City Improvement Trust" was formed in 1945, and in 1949, the "City" and the "Cantonment" merged to form the Bengaluru City Corporation. The Government of Karnataka later constituted the Bangalore Development Authority in 1976 to coordinate the activities of these two bodies. Public sector employment and education provided opportunities for Kannadigas from the rest of the state to migrate to the city. Bengaluru experienced rapid growth in the decades 1941–51 and 1971–81, which saw the arrival of many immigrants from northern Karnataka. By 1961, Bengaluru had become the sixth-largest city in India, with a population of 1,207,000. In the following decades, Bengaluru's manufacturing base continued to expand with the establishment of various public and private companies.|

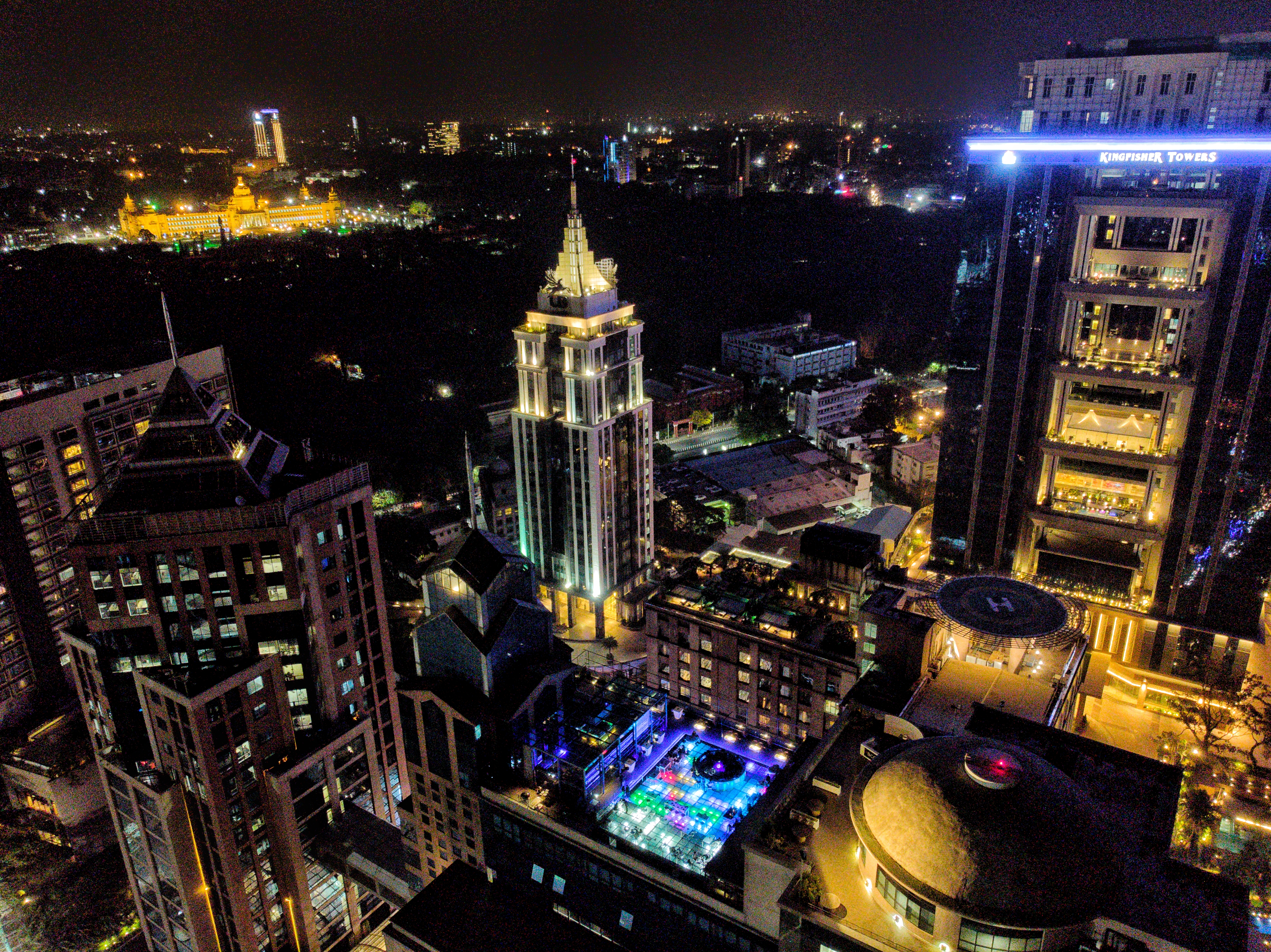
UB City, a business district, in 2019

By the 1980s, urbanisation had spilled over the current boundaries, and in 1986, the Bangalore Metropolitan Region Development Authority, was established to co-ordinate the development of the entire region as a single unit. On 8 February 1981, a major fire broke out at Venus Circus in Bengaluru, where more than 92 people died, the majority of them children. Bengaluru experienced a growth in its real estate market in the 1980s and 1990s, spurred by capital investors from other parts of the country who converted Bengaluru's large plots and colonial bungalows into multi-storied apartments. Since the late 1980s, many information technology companies were set up in the city and by the end of the 20th century, Bengaluru had established itself as the "Silicon Valley of India". The population has increased significantly due to migration from other parts for work, and the city has become the third most populous city in 2011. During the 21st century, Bengaluru has had major terrorist attacks in 2008, 2010, and 2013.

== Geography ==
Bengaluru lies in the southeast of the South Indian state of Karnataka in the heart of the Mysore Plateau (a region of the larger Deccan Plateau) at an average elevation of 900 m (2,953 ft). The city covers an area of 741 km^{2} (286 sq mi). The Bengaluru metropolitan region covers an area of 7,005 km^{2} (2,705 sq mi) across three districts–Bengaluru urban, Bengaluru rural and Ramanagara. The Bangalore Metropolitan Region Development Authority, established in 1985, is responsible for the planning of the metropolitan region. The topography is generally flat, with the highest point at Doddabettahalli, located 962 m (3,156 ft) above sea level on a ridge on the western part of the city. Towards the south, the terrain is uneven, with small hills and rocks made of granite and gneiss.

The soil in the city consist of red laterite and red, fine loamy to clayey soils. The vegetation in the eastern and northern parts consists of scrubs interspersed with various water bodies, and the southern hilly region consists of scrubs and forests. The city had a forest cover of 68.3% in the early 1970s, which reduced to less than 15% in the 2010s. Trees are frequently felled to pave way for infrastructure development. Though the city has been classified as a part of the seismic zone II (a stable zone), it has experienced earthquakes of magnitude as high as 4.5 on the Richter scale.

=== Hydrography ===
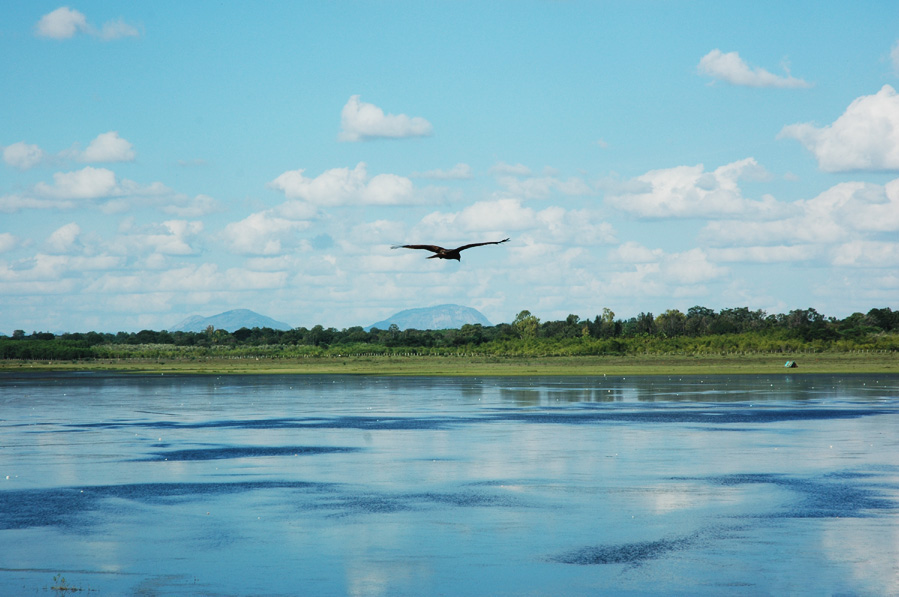
Hesaraghatta Lake in north Bengaluru

There are no major rivers run in the city, though six rivers arise at the Nandi Hills, about 60 km (37 mi) to the north. The Vrishabhavathi, a tributary of Arkavathi flows through the city. Arkavathi, Dakshina Pinakini and its tributary Chinnar, and Suvarnamukhi rivers water the fringes of the city. Most of these rivers are polluted, and depleted due to sewage from the city. Kaveri runs towards the southwest of the city, the water from which is used to cater to majority of the water requirements of the city. The city has a considerable number of freshwater lakes and water tanks, most of which are seasonal and rain-fed. The city had 265 lakes in the 1960s, which shrunk to 98 by the late 2010s, and most of the city's lakes are polluted. The government began revival and conservation efforts in 2020. Groundwater occurs in silty to sandy layers of the alluvial sediments, and are extracted through open wells.

=== Climate ===
Bengaluru has a tropical savanna climate (Köppen climate classification Aw) with distinct wet and dry seasons. Due to its high elevation, Bengaluru usually enjoys a more moderate climate throughout the year, although occasional heat waves can make summer somewhat uncomfortable. The dry season extends from December to February followed by the summer season from March to May. The monsoon brings most of the rainfall from June to September, followed by a post-monsoon season in October and November. April is the hottest month with an average high of 34.1 °C (93.4 °F), and January is the coolest month with an average low temperature of 15.1 °C (59.2 °F). The highest temperature ever recorded in Bengaluru was 39.2 °C (103 °F), recorded 24 April 2016, corresponding with the strong El Niño in that year. The lowest ever recorded is 7.8 °C (46 °F) in January 1884. Winter temperatures rarely drop below 14 °C (57 °F), and summer temperatures seldom exceed 36 °C (97 °F). Bengaluru receives rainfall from both the northeast and the southwest monsoons, and the wettest months is September, followed by October and August. The summer heat is moderated by fairly frequent thunderstorms, which occasionally cause power outages and local flooding, such as in 2022. Most of the rainfall occurs during the late afternoon or evening and rain before noon is infrequent. The heaviest rainfall recorded in a 24-hour period is 179 mm (7 in) recorded on 1 October 1997.

Climate data for Bengaluru (1991–2020, extremes 1883–present)
Month	Jan	Feb	Mar	Apr	May	Jun	Jul	Aug	Sep	Oct	Nov	Dec	Year
Record high °C (°F)	33.4 (92.1)	35.9 (96.6)	37.9 (100.2)	39.2 (102.6)	38.9 (102.0)	38.1 (100.6)	33.3 (91.9)	33.3 (91.9)	33.3 (91.9)	32.4 (90.3)	33.0 (91.4)	31.1 (88.0)	39.2 (102.6)
Mean maximum °C (°F)	31.1 (88.0)	34.1 (93.4)	35.5 (95.9)	37.0 (98.6)	35.8 (96.4)	31.8 (89.2)	31.1 (88.0)	30.8 (87.4)	31.4 (88.5)	31.4 (88.5)	30.8 (87.4)	30.3 (86.5)	37.2 (99.0)
Mean daily maximum °C (°F)	28.4 (83.1)	30.9 (87.6)	33.4 (92.1)	34.1 (93.4)	33.1 (91.6)	29.7 (85.5)	28.3 (82.9)	28.1 (82.6)	28.6 (83.5)	28.5 (83.3)	27.4 (81.3)	26.9 (80.4)	29.8 (85.6)
Daily mean °C (°F)	22.3 (72.1)	24.3 (75.7)	26.8 (80.2)	28.1 (82.6)	27.4 (81.3)	25.2 (77.4)	24.2 (75.6)	24.1 (75.4)	24.3 (75.7)	24.0 (75.2)	22.9 (73.2)	21.7 (71.1)	24.6 (76.3)
Mean daily minimum °C (°F)	16.1 (61.0)	17.6 (63.7)	20.2 (68.4)	22.1 (71.8)	21.8 (71.2)	20.6 (69.1)	20.1 (68.2)	20.0 (68.0)	20.0 (68.0)	19.8 (67.6)	18.3 (64.9)	16.4 (61.5)	19.4 (66.9)
Mean minimum °C (°F)	13.4 (56.1)	14.9 (58.8)	17.3 (63.1)	20.5 (68.9)	20.5 (68.9)	19.5 (67.1)	19.2 (66.6)	18.4 (65.1)	17.2 (63.0)	16.6 (61.9)	15.3 (59.5)	14.2 (57.6)	12.7 (54.9)
Record low °C (°F)	7.8 (46.0)	9.4 (48.9)	11.1 (52.0)	14.4 (57.9)	16.7 (62.1)	16.7 (62.1)	16.1 (61.0)	14.4 (57.9)	15.0 (59.0)	13.2 (55.8)	9.6 (49.3)	8.9 (48.0)	7.8 (46.0)
Average rainfall mm (inches)	1.6 (0.06)	7.1 (0.28)	14.7 (0.58)	61.7 (2.43)	128.7 (5.07)	110.3 (4.34)	116.4 (4.58)	162.7 (6.41)	208.3 (8.20)	186.4 (7.34)	64.5 (2.54)	15.4 (0.61)	1,077.8 (42.43)
Average rainy days	0.2	0.3	1.1	4.0	7.5	6.8	8.0	10.2	9.5	9.6	4.2	1.3	62.7
Average relative humidity (%) (at 17:30 IST)	41	32	29	35	47	62	65	67	64	65	61	53	52
Average dew point °C (°F)	13 (55)	12 (54)	13 (55)	17 (63)	19 (66)	19 (66)	19 (66)	19 (66)	19 (66)	18 (64)	17 (63)	15 (59)	17 (62)
Mean monthly sunshine hours	262.3	247.6	271.4	257.0	241.1	136.8	111.8	114.3	143.6	173.1	190.2	211.7	2,360.9
Average ultraviolet index	10	12	12	12	12	12	12	12	12	12	10	10	12
Source 1: India Meteorological Department Time and Date (dewpoints, 2005–2015)
Source 2: NOAA (sun: 1971–1990), Tokyo Climate Center (mean temperatures 1991–2020); Weather Atlas March record high

== Demographics ==
Population

Population growth

Year	Pop.	±%
1941	406,760	—
1951	778,977	+91.5%
1961	1,207,000	+54.9%
1971	1,654,000	+37.0%

Year	Pop.	±%
1981	2,922,000	+76.7%
1991	4,130,000	+41.3%
2001	5,101,000	+23.5%
2011	8,425,970	+65.2%

Source: Census of India

As per the 2011 census, Bengaluru had a population of 8,443,675, which made it the third most populous city in India, and the largest in South India. The urban agglomeration was home to 8,499,399 people, and was the fifth most populous urban agglomeration in India. As per a 2016 estimate, the urban agglomeration had a population of about 10.45 million. The city was amongst the fastest growing cities in the last two decades, with the population increasing substantially due to migration from rest of the country. About 13.2% of the population belonged to scheduled castes, and scheduled tribes. Residents of Bengaluru are referred to as Bengaloorinavaru in Kannada and "Bengalureans" in English.

There are about 597 slums in the city, housing roughly 16% of the city's population. The city had a Gini coefficient of 0.64, indicating significant inequality. Various studies have also indicated various inequalities in the infrastructure development across different parts of the city, and other urbanisation problems such as mass displacements, proliferation of slums, and public health crisis due to water shortage and sewage problems in poor and working-class neighbourhoods. In the Ease of Living Index 2020 published by the Ministry of Housing & Urban Affairs, the city was ranked the most liveable Indian city with a population of over a million. In the 2023 Quality of Living survey by Mercer, which evaluated living conditions for expatriates, Bengaluru was ranked 156th globally and third in India, after Hyderabad and Pune.

=== Ethnicity and religion ===
Religion in Bengaluru (2011)
Religion	Percent
Hinduism	78.87%
Islam	13.90%
Christianity	5.61%
Jainism	0.97%
Sikhism	0.15%
Buddhism	0.06%
Others	0.44%

According to the 2011 census, Hinduism is the major religion with 78.9% of adherents. Muslims comprisd 13.9% of the population, with Christians and Jains accounting for 5.6% and 1.0% of the population, respectively. Muslims in the city consist of Dakhini and Urdu-speaking Muslims, Kutchi Memons, Labbay, and Mappilas. Christians in Bengaluru include Roman Catholics including Tamil Christians, Mangalorean Catholics, Kannadiga Christians, Malayali Syrian Christians, Protestants, and Northeast Indian Christians.

Apart from the Kannadigas native to the region, Tamils, Telugus and Deccanis, form a significant population of the city. In the 16th century, Tamil speakers, who also spoke Kannada, settled in the region for business. Telugus came to the city on invitation of the Mysore royalty. Since the late 20th century, there has been a steady migration of people from other states for study and work. About 90% of the migrants came from the South Indian states, with the number of migrants from other parts of India increasing over the last few decades of the 20th century. Majority of the migration from non-South Indians states included Maharashtrians, Punjabis, Rajasthanis, Gujaratis, Bengalis, and from Uttar Pradesh. Migrant communities from within the state include Tuluvas and Konkanis of coastal Karnataka, and Kodavas from the state's Kodagu district. The city also had an Anglo-Indian population of about 10,000 people in 2006.

=== Languages ===
Pop. by mother tongue in Bengaluru (2011)
Language	Percent
Kannada	42.05%
Tamil	16.34%
Telugu	13.73%
Urdu	13.00%
Hindi	4.64%
Others	10.24%

As per the 2011 census, Kannada is the mother tongue of 42.1% of the city's population with 3,574,226 speakers, which is the official language of the state – followed by Tamil (1,388,305) Telugu (1,166,338), Urdu (1,104,124), Hindi (476,673), Malayalam (268,780), and Marathi (174,451). Other languages with a sizeable numbers of speakers include Konkani, Bengali, Marwari, Tulu, Odia, Gujarati, Kodagu, Punjabi, Lambadi, Sindhi and Nepali. Bengaluru Kannada is the local dialect of Kannada spoken in the region. English is widely spoken by white-collar workers and is the principal business language. With a diverse population speaking multiple languages, the city has often seen controversies and issues with respect to the usage of English and other vernacular languages. In 2023, the government mandated the usage of Kannada in the sign boards of all businesses, which led to protests. There have also been court cases, protests, and diverse public opinion on the usage of different languages in the city.

== Administration and politics ==
=== Administration ===
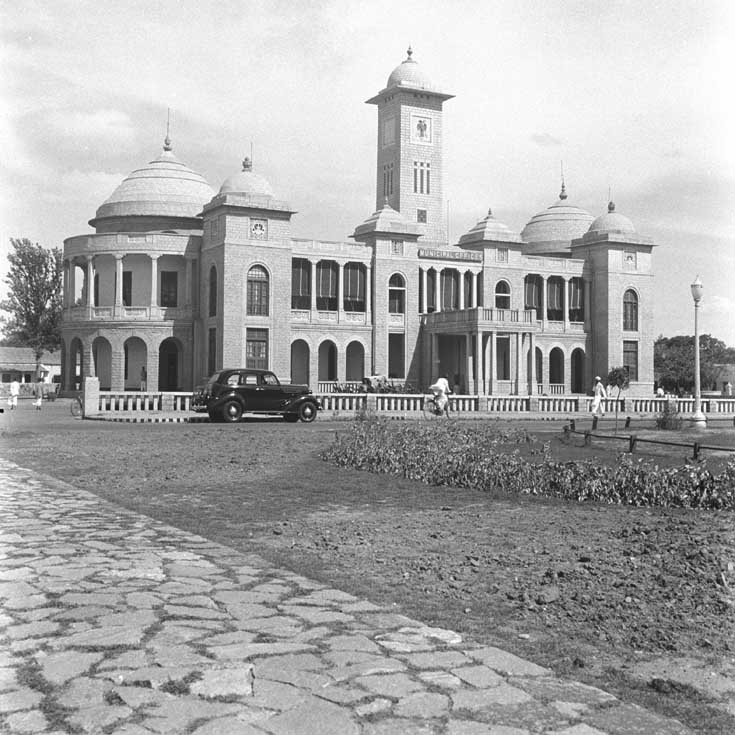
The Municipal office building in the early 20th century

The Bangalore Municipal Board was established on 27 March 1862, with a separate board formed later to manage the cantonment area of the city. In 1881, these were organised into Bangalore city municipality and Bangalore civil and military station municipality respectively. The two municipalities were merged in 1949, into a single municipal corporation with 70 members. In 2007, the Bruhat Bengaluru Mahanagara Palike was established by merging the Bangalore Mahanagara Palike (Bangalore municipal corporation), with seven neighbouring city municipal councils, one town municipal council and 111 village panchayats around the city. In July 2025,

The Greater Bengaluru Governance Bill, 2024 provided for the division of BBMP into up to seven city corporations. In July 2025, the state government notified the creation of five corporation–Bengaluru Central City Corporation, Bengaluru North City Corporation, Bengaluru South City Corporation, Bengaluru East City Corporation, and Bengaluru West City Corporation. The Greater Bengaluru Authority (GBA), was established as the apex body responsible for the co-ordination and supervision of the five city corporations, and is responsible for the planning and management of the city and its suburbs, covering an area of 1,400 km^{2} (540 sq mi).

The erstwhile Bengaluru corporation covered an area 741 km^{2} (286 sq mi), divided into ten zones covering 223 wards. It was headed by a mayor, elected by the councillors, who were elected through a popular vote by the residents. The municipal commissioner is responsible for daily administration. As per the new structure proposed by the 2024 legislation, each of the five city corporations will have an independent mayor and council. As the last elections to the BBMP council were held in 2015, and its term ended in 2020, the administration has since been managed by a state-appointed administrator until elections are held as per the new structure. As per the Ministry of Housing and Urban Affairs, the BBMP had a revenue of ₹55.87 billion (US$600 million) and an expenditure of ₹64.65 billion (US$690 million) in 2021–22.

The Bangalore Development Authority (BDA) was established in 1976, and is the nodal agency responsible for the planning and development of the city. The BDA works in conjunction with local government and the Agenda for Bangalore's Infrastructure and Development Task Force (ABIDe) to design and implement civic and infrastructural projects in the city. The Bangalore Metropolitan Region Development Authority, established in 1985, is responsible for the planning of the metropolitan region. As the capital of the state of Karntaka, the city houses the state executive and legislative headquarters in the Vidhana Soudha, state ministries at Vikasa Soudha, and the residence of the Governor at Raj Bhavan.

=== Law and order ===
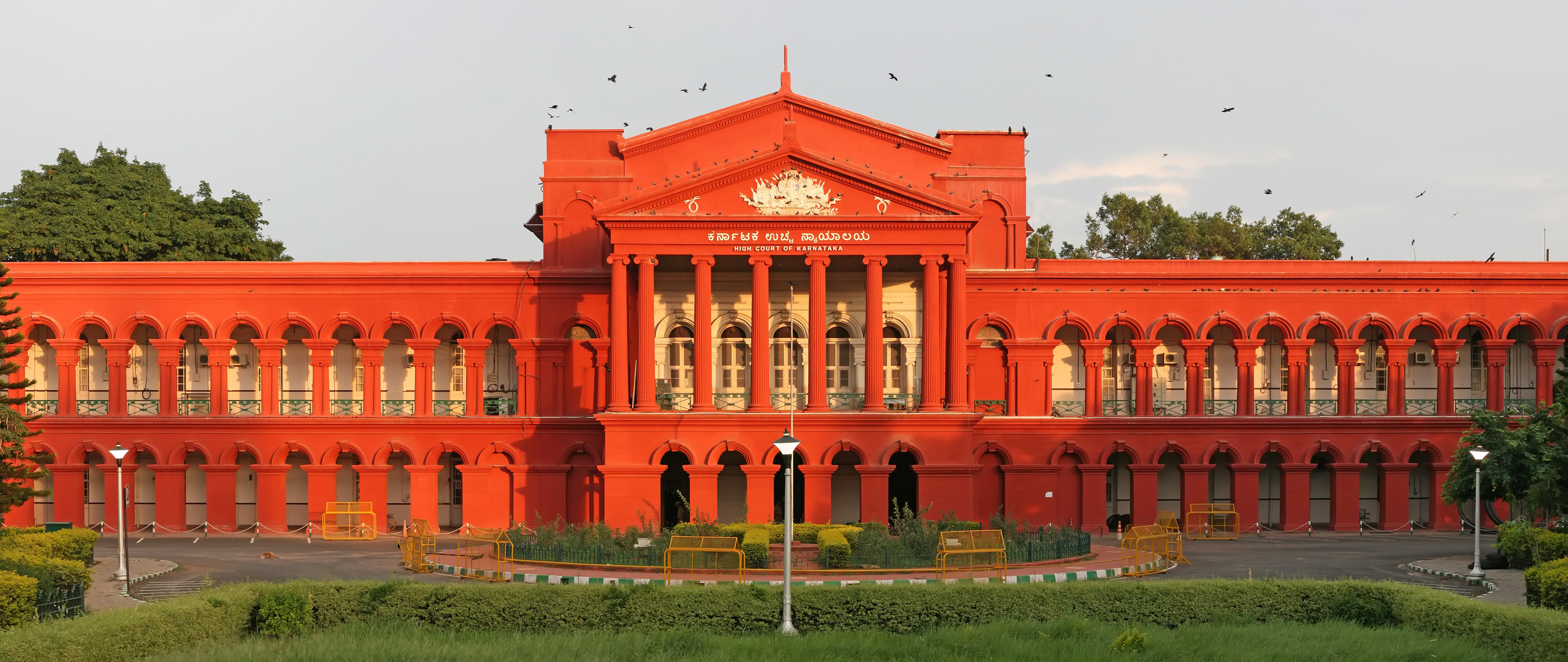
Karnataka High Court in Bengaluru is the highest judicial body in the state

Karnataka High Court in Bengaluru is the highest judicial authority in the state, and manages a series of sub-ordinate civil and criminal courts. The Bengaluru City Police is the primary law enforcement agency in the city and is headed by a commissioner of police. The city is divided into eleven zones, each of which is headed by an deputy commissioner. The zones are further divided into sub-divisions headed by assistant commissioners, who are in control of several police stations in their respective jurisdition, each of which is headed by an inspector. There are separate crime, intelligence, and administration wings of the police. The police also operate special and armed units. As of February 2024, the city police consisted of 18,308 civilian police working across 113 police stations, and 6,999 armed reserve personnel. The city had 191 cops per hundred thousand people, well below the standard of 673 set by the United Nations. Bengaluru City Traffic Police is responsible for the traffic management in the city. The traffic police operates 48 stations across three zones, each of which is headed by a joint commissioner. As of 2021, the crime rate in the city was 27.2 per hundred thousand people. The Bangalore Central Prison located at Parappana Agrahara, was established in 1997, and is the major prison in the city.

=== Politics ===
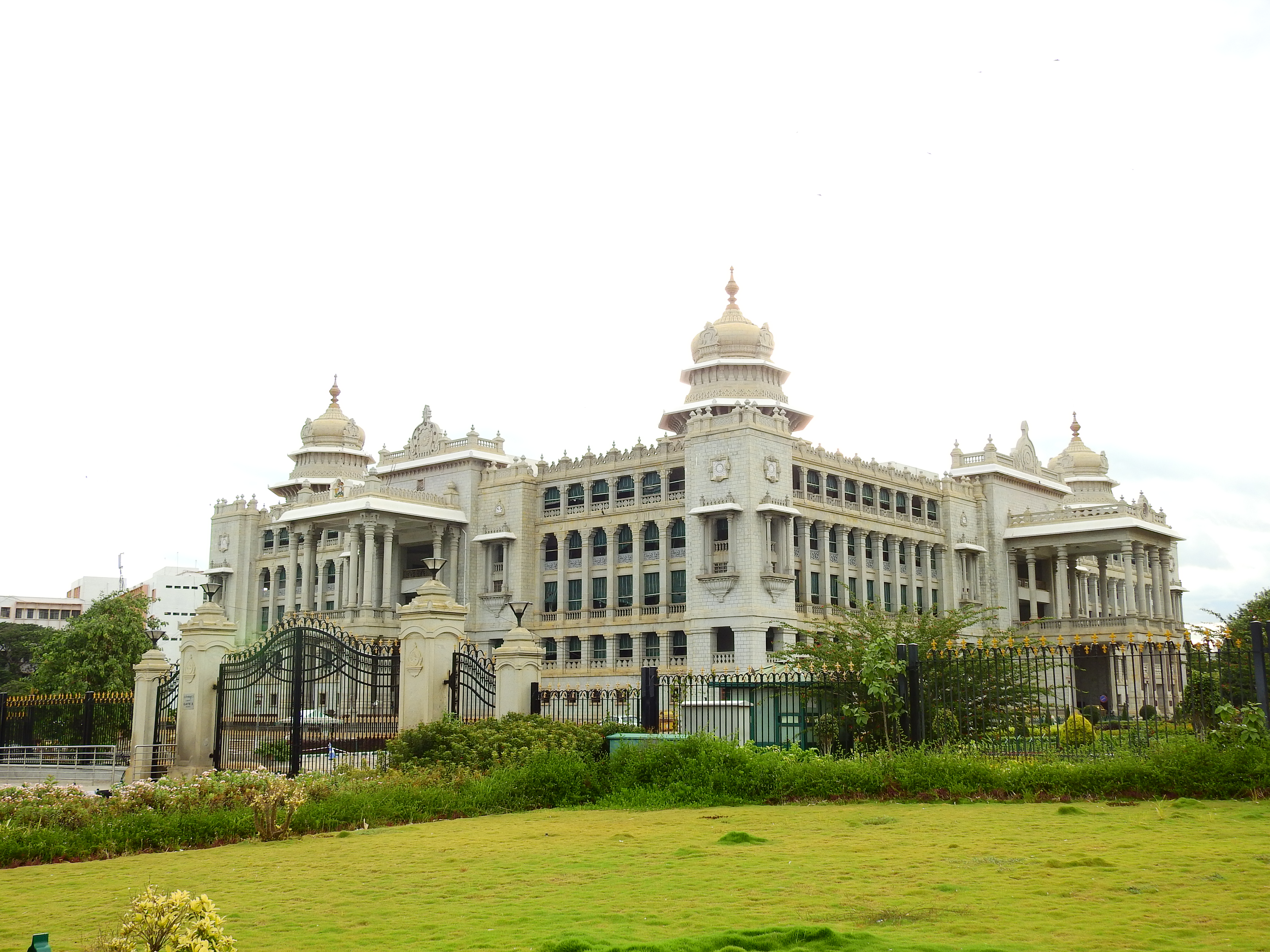
The Vikasa Soudha houses multiple state ministries

The major part of the city falls under four parliamentary constituencies–Bangalore Rural, Bangalore Central, Bangalore North, and Bangalore South. The city elects 28 MLAs to the Karnataka Legislative Assembly. The politics of the city and the state have been dominated by the two national parties– the Indian National Congress, and the Bharatiya Janata Party (BJP). Contrary to other major South Indian cities, there are no major regional parties with a considerable influence in the region, with only the Janata Dal (Secular) (JDS) having some influence. In the 2023 Karnataka Legislative Assembly election, the BJP won 15 seats, and the Congress won 13 seats in the city. In the 2024 Indian general elections, the BJP won all the four Lok Sabha seats in the city. The last elections to the BBMP was held in 2015, in which the BJP won 100 seats, and the Congress won 76 seats. The Congress held the mayor post with the support of the JDS till 2019, after which the BJP captured power when the JDS switched its allegiance. In 2020, the term of the council ended, and with no elections had since been conducted till 2024, the BBMP is managed by a government appointed administrator.

== Culture ==
=== Arts ===
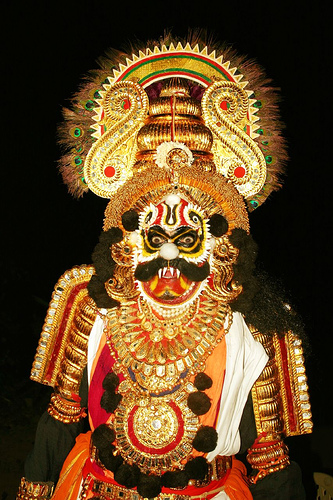
Yakshagana, a theatre art of coastal Karnataka, played in the city

Bengaluru is a major centre of Indian classical music and dance. The cultural scene features a diverse set of music concerts, dance performances and plays. Performances of Carnatic and Hindustani music, and dance forms like Bharat Natyam, Kuchipudi, Kathakali, Kathak, and Odissi are popular in the city. Yakshagana, a theatre art indigenous to coastal Karnataka is often played in town halls. The two main music seasons include April–May during Ram Navami, and September–October during Dusshera, when majority of the music activities are organised by various cultural organisations. Rock music is popular in the urban parts of the city, and the city has its own subgenre of rock, "Bangalore Rock", an amalgamation of classic rock, hard rock and heavy metal, and some jazz and blues. The city is home to several Indian bands, and is referred to as "Pub Capital of India" and the "Rock/Metal Capital of India" because of its underground music scene.

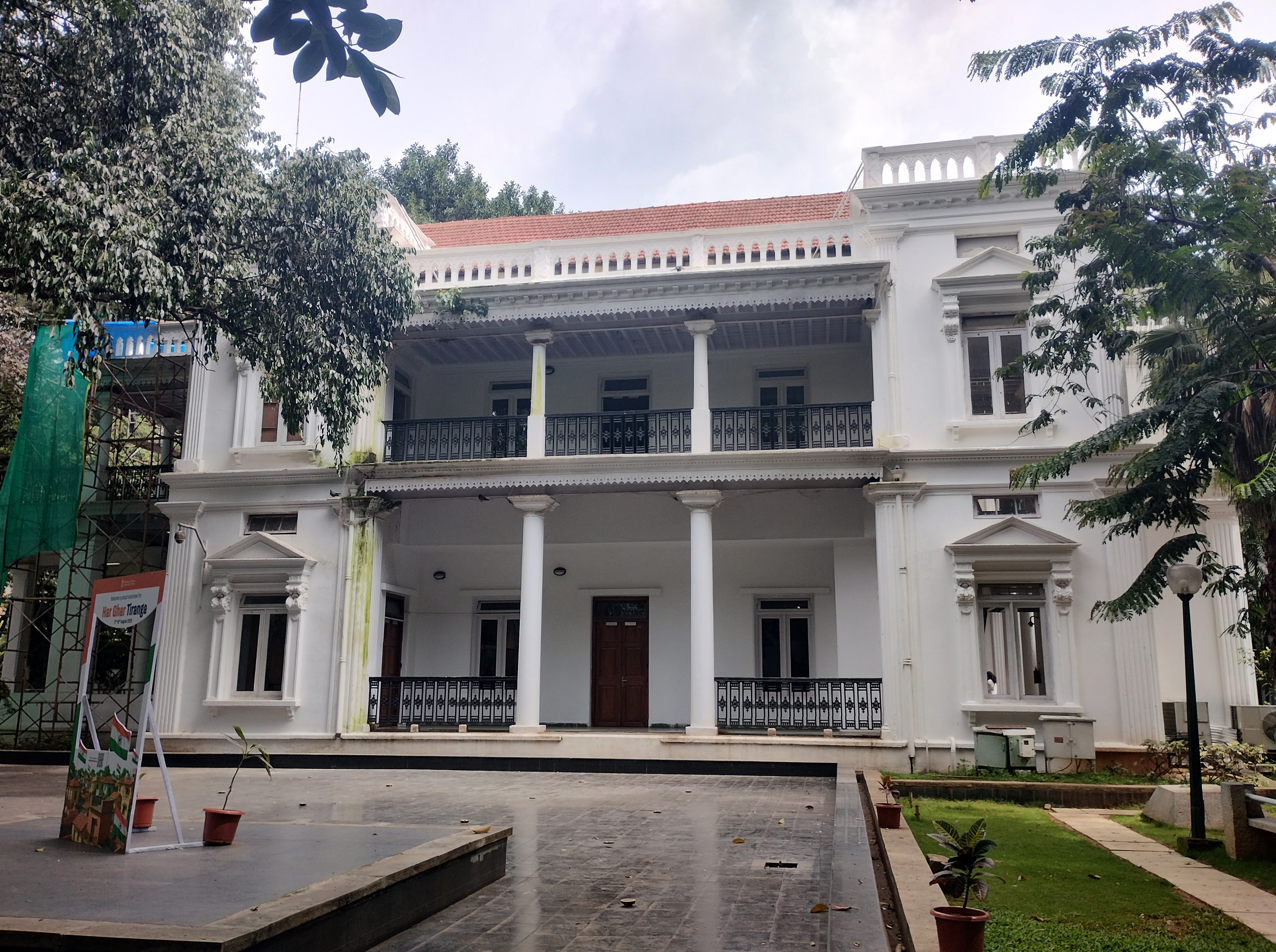
National Gallery of Modern Art in Bengaluru

Several art galleries including the government-established National Gallery of Modern Art emerged in the 1990s. The Karnataka Chitrakala Parishath showcases a collection of painting, sculptures, and various other forms of art. The Indian Cartoon Gallery organised by the Indian Institute of Cartoonists, conducts periodic cartoon exhibitions. "Art Bangalore" is an international art festival, held annually in the city since 2010. Kannada Sahitya Parishat is a nonprofit organisation headquartered in Bengaluru that promotes the Kannada language and literature. The "Bangalore Literature Festival" is an annual literary event organised since 2012. Karnataka Rajyotsava, which marks the formation of Karnataka state on 1 November 1956, is celebrated on the same day annually and is a public holiday in the city. Bengaluru is a major centre of the Kannada film industry, which released 224 Kannada feature films in 2018. Art theatres that stages English and Kannada language plays in the city include Chowdiah Memorial Hall, Ranga Shankara, and Ravindra Kalakshetra. British Council, Alliance Française de Bangalore, and Max Müller Bhavan also organise foreign language plays including those of drama companies that tour India.

=== Cuisine ===
Bengaluru has diverse food options including South Indian, North Indian, Chinese, and western fast food. Popular vegetarian dishes include masala dosa, paneer biryani, and paneer butter masala. Udupi cuisine restaurants are popular and serve predominantly vegetarian, regional cuisine. Mavalli Tiffin Room, known for its Karnataka-style vegetarian food, was opened in 1924 and vegetarian tiffin restaurant Vidyarthi Bhavan opened in 1943. Since the late 1980s, many vegetarian self-service darshinis operate in the city. The city also has multiple vegan restaurants, and vegan advocacy groups, and has been named as India's most vegan-friendly city by PETA India.

=== Festivals ===
Bangalore Karaga or "Karaga Shaktyotsava" is a festival dedicated to the Hindu goddess Draupadi, and celebrated annually by the Thigala community over a period of nine days in March or April. The Someshwara Car festival is held annually in April, when the idol of the Halasuru Someshwara Temple is taken for a procession on a flower chariot. Other popular festivals include Ugadi, Ram Navami, Eid ul-Fitr, Ganesh Chaturthi, St. Mary's feast, Dasara, Deepawali and Christmas.

== Economy ==
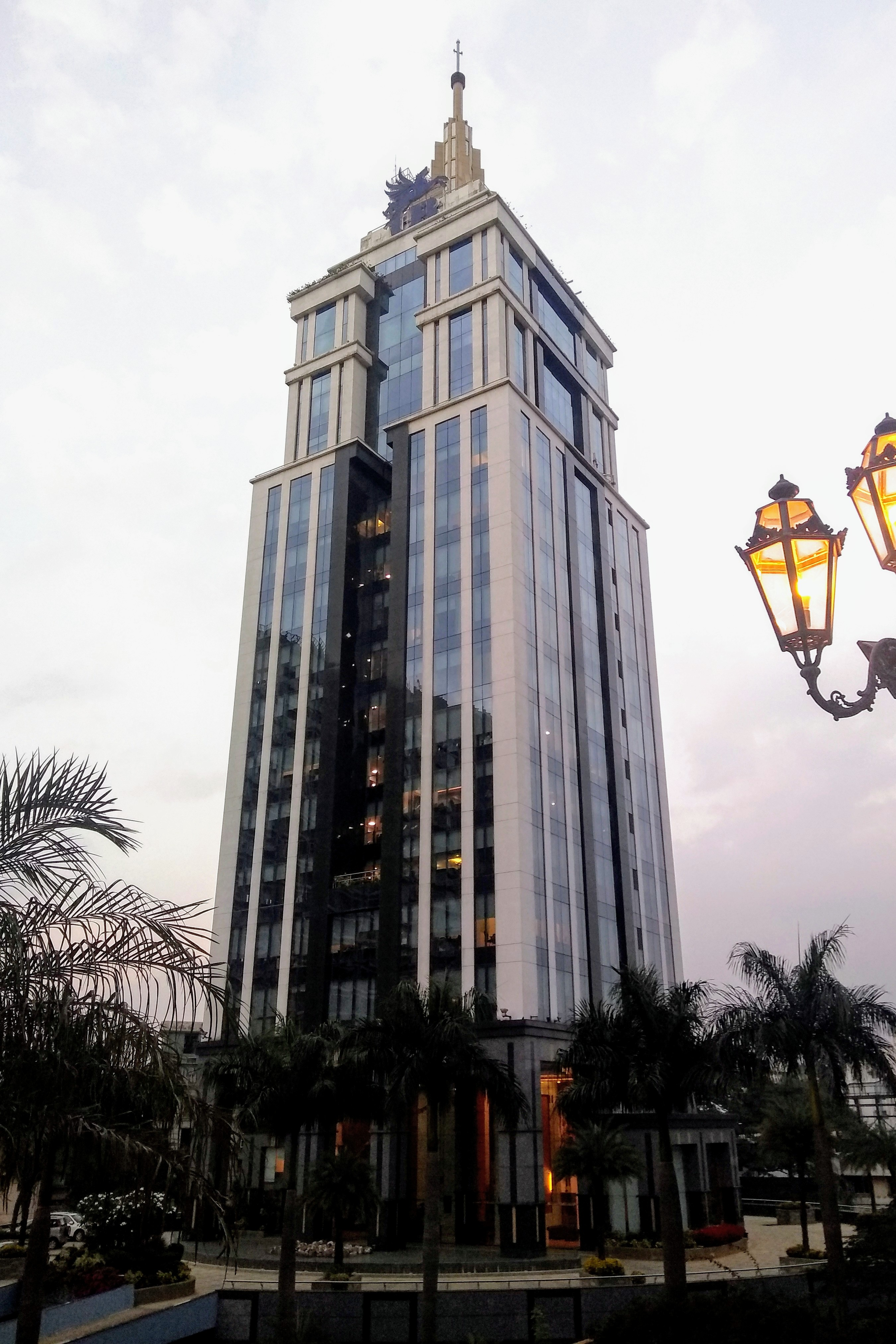
UB Tower in the Bengaluru Central Business District

Bengaluru is one of the fastest-growing metropolises in India. As of 2024, Bengaluru metropolitan area had an estimated GDP of $590.4 billion, ranking it among the most productive metro areas in India. According to the Globalization and World Cities Research Network, Bengaluru is amongst the most integrated with the global economy, classified as an alpha-city. The city contributes to nearly one-third of the state GSDP, and has a diversified industrial base dependent on services (39.5% contribution to GDP), manufacturing (36%), and agriculture (2.3%). Bengaluru has the country's fourth largest fast-moving consumer goods market. The city also has the third highest number of high-net-worth individuals in India. Major industrial sectors include information technology, automobiles, aerospace, textiles, heavy machinery, biotechnology, electronics, and communication, agriculture, and food processing. The industrial clusters are spread across the city and its suburbs. As of 2016, the city had more than 75,000 industries including more than 2,000 information technology companies. It hosted 87 Fortune 500 companies, the fifth highest number amongst the cities in India.

World Trade Center at Bengaluru

Bengaluru is a major centre for information technology (IT), and is consistently ranked amongst the world's fastest growing technology hubs. It is widely regarded as the "Silicon Valley of India", as the largest IT hub of the country. The IT export from the city is estimated to be valued at $64 billion in 2024, and the city contributes to more than one third of India's total IT exports. The IT industry in the city is divided into various business clusters and special economic zones such as Electronic City, International Tech Park, Software Technology Park, Bagmane Tech Park, Global Village Tech Park, World Trade Center, and Manyata Embassy Business Park amongst others. The growth of IT industry has resulted in the migration of people from all over the country, which has resulted in the demand for improvement in the city's infrastructure and presented the city with other challenges. The industry has been blamed for not favouring local employment development, increased land values, and closure of small enterprises. The resistance from the city for further investments required to develop infrastructure, has forced some of the new and expanding businesses elsewhere.

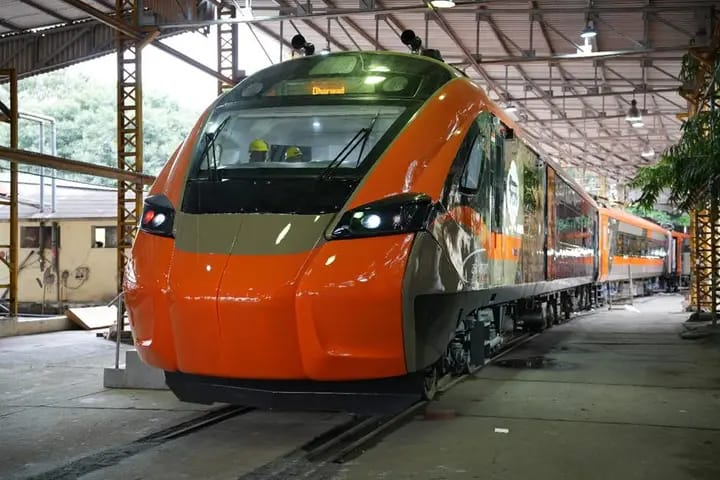
A train set manufactured at BEML

Bengaluru is also a major hub for Indian biotechnology-related industry, which was valued at nearly $25 billion in 2021–22. The city is home to more than 40 biotech companies, and is termed as the "Biotech capital of India". The city is a major export centre for agricultural produce including fruits, and poultry. Major crops include rice, maize, ragi, horse gram, oil seeds, coconuts, and fruits such as mango, papaya, banana, grapes, and pomegranate. Flowers such as roses are grown commercially. The Rail Wheel Factory at Yelahanka is a major supplier of wheels and axles for Indian Railways. State owned corporations BEML and Bharat Electronics are headquartered in the city, and manufacture aerospace components, power equipment, trainsets, armoured vehicles, and electronics for both civilian and defence requirements.

== Infrastructure ==
=== Water supply ===
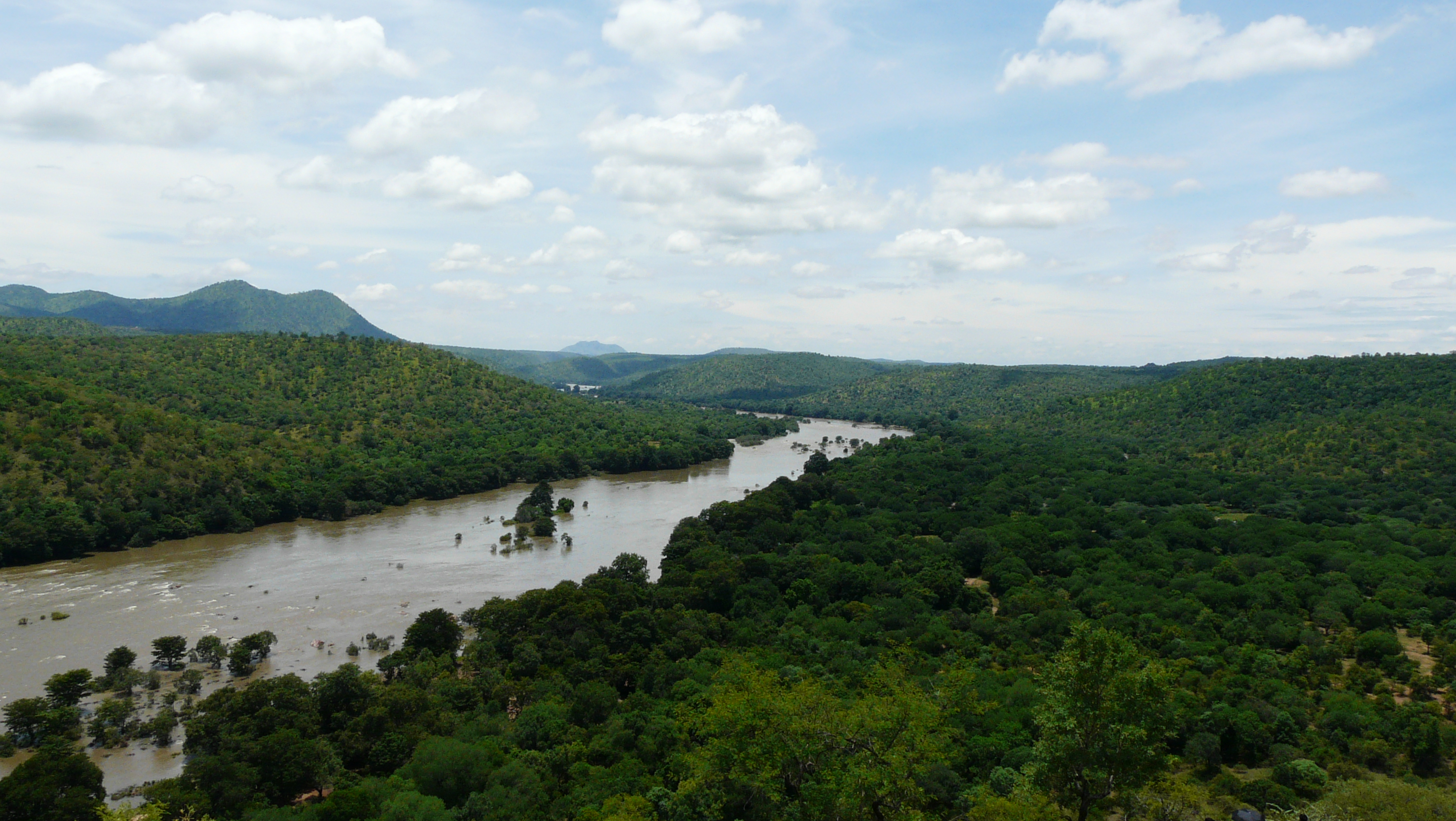
The city draws majority of the water requirement from the Kaveri River

Water supply is provided by the Bangalore Water Supply and Sewerage Board (BWSSB), which was established in 1964. The city receives an average of 800 million litres (180 million imperial gallons; 210 million US gallons) of water per day from rainfall. In the 16th century, Kempe Gowda constructed lakes such as the Kempambudhi Kere to store the rain water. As of 2021, the city had a daily water demand of 2,100 million litres (460 million imperial gallons; 550 million US gallons), of which 1,450 million litres (320 million imperial gallons; 380 million US gallons) is catered to by the corporation. While the city drew water from the Arkavathy River earlier, the increasing demands led to the establishment of the Cauvery water supply scheme in 1964. Majority of the water supply to the city is drawn from the Kaveri, with the amount of water drawn increasing from 135 million litres (30 million imperial gallons; 36 million US gallons) in 1974 to 1,450 million litres (320 million imperial gallons; 380 million US gallons) per day in 2014. A 2015 report indicated that one-third of the slum clearance projects lacked basic water service connections, 60% of slum dwellers lacked complete water supply lines and used a shared water supply. The city does face water shortages, especially during summer and in years with low rainfall.

In early 2024, Bengaluru faced a water crisis due to depleted water reservoirs in the Kaveri basin as a consequence of a weak monsoon, and low groundwater levels. Borewells, which contribute a sufficient share to the city's water consumption, ran dry, and the government was forced to operate water tankers from outside the city and impose restrictions on non-essential water usage.

=== Waste management and pollution ===
Waste collection and management is done by the city corporation. Pollution regulation and issuance of waste management guidelines is carried out by the Karnataka State Pollution Control Board (KSPCB), which comes under the aegis of Central Pollution Control Board (CPCB), and is headquartered in the city. As of 2022, Bengaluru produced around 6,000 tonnes (5,900 long tons; 6,600 short tons) of solid waste per day. The wastes are segregated, compacted, and transported to any of the three garbage processing plants in Bingipura, Mavallipura, or Kudlu. As per a 2024 study, the three garbage processing plants were found to be violating environmental regulations, and emitted high levels of particulate matter, causing damage to the local environment and increasing the pollution levels of the city. As of 2024, the corporation operated seven wet waste processing plants, 13 bio methane generation plants, and a land fill. The corporation earlier operated three more landfill sites at Mavallipura, Mandur, and Doddaballapura, which were closed after complaints from local residents, and reports of diseases due to unsanitary conditions. In 2024, the government identified four new locations for the construction of new landfill sites. As part of the waste management guidelines, the government of Karnataka has authorised specific companies to manage biomedical and e-wastes in the city. However, a report in October 2024 indicated that some of these companies were not disposing of the wastes in the prescribed manner, and are involved in re-selling.

The city has considerable pollution due to vehicle and industrial exhausts, and unscientific waste disposal. The pollution level varies across localities, with higher concentrations of particulate matter reported in industrial and high traffic zones. A random sampling of the air quality index (AQI) of twenty stations within the city suggested heavy to severe air pollution around areas of high traffic. While the average air quality was at acceptable levels, the PM 2.5 levels exceeded the 60 μg/m^{3} threshold set by the CPCB in certain areas. A evaluation of Bengaluru's physical, biological and socioeconomic parameters indicated that the city's air quality and noise pollution were poor.

=== Power ===
In 1905, Bengaluru was among the first cities to have electric power. The city was powered by hydro power generated by the hydroelectric plant in Shivanasamudra. Electricity in the city is regulated through the Bangalore Electricity Supply Company (BESCOM). The power consumption has steadily increased over the last decade and in 2022–23, the city had a peak demand of 3,632 MW. As of March 2024, the city had a daily power requirement of about 157 million kWh, and consumed nearly 40% of the power in the state. The city draws power from the state grid, which receives power from a mixture of fossil fuels and renewable sources. In 2024, BESCOM initiated the process of moving overhead lines to underground in the city.

=== Health and sanitation ===
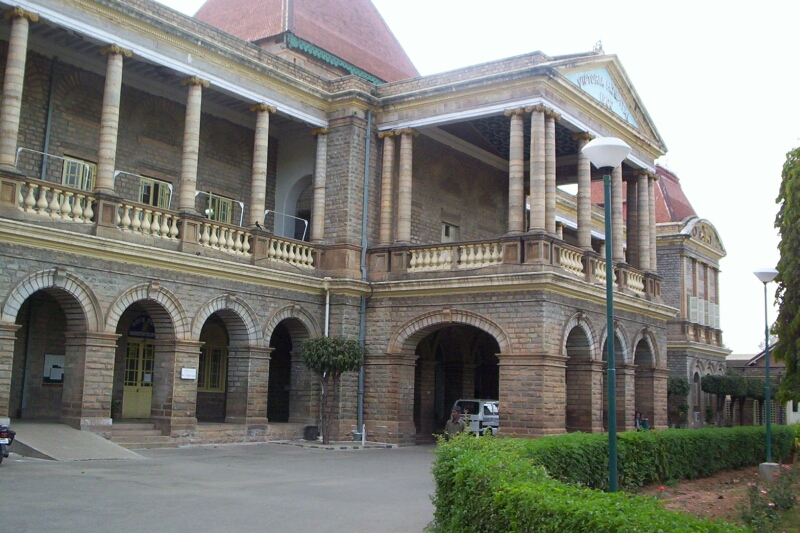
Victoria Hospital was opened in 1900

In the early 19th century, healthcare services were provided by local physicians. In 1834, English doctors were appointed, to take care of vaccination, and control the spread of epidemics. The first public clinic was established in Bangalore Fort in 1835, and a small hospital was added in 1839 in the Pete area. In 1846, a large hospital was opened, with a leper colony added in 1845, and a mental hospital in 1850. The Victoria Hospital was inaugurated in 1900. As of 2024, the Bengaluru corporation managed one major general hospital, six referral hospitals, 26 maternity homes, and 230 outpatient clinics. There are many private clinics, and tertiary care hospitals in the city. The city has been growing as a centre of medical tourism due to the availability of more than 50 tertiary care hospitals. Vaccination such as polio vaccine is administered by the corporation on behalf of the government.

Sanitation facilities are provided by the Bangalore Water Supply and Sewerage Board. The underground drainage and sewerage disposal system was introduced in 1922. As of 2024, about 1,400 million litres (310 million imperial gallons; 370 million US gallons) of waste water is generated daily, which flows through a network of nearly 8,387 km (5,211 mi) of sewage pipes to any of the 33 sewage treatment plants. Encroachment, and damages to the sewerage system, has resulted in wastewater entering the lakes, and polluting the water sources. As of 2024, the corporation operated 401 public toilets and 17 community toilets across the city.

=== Communication ===
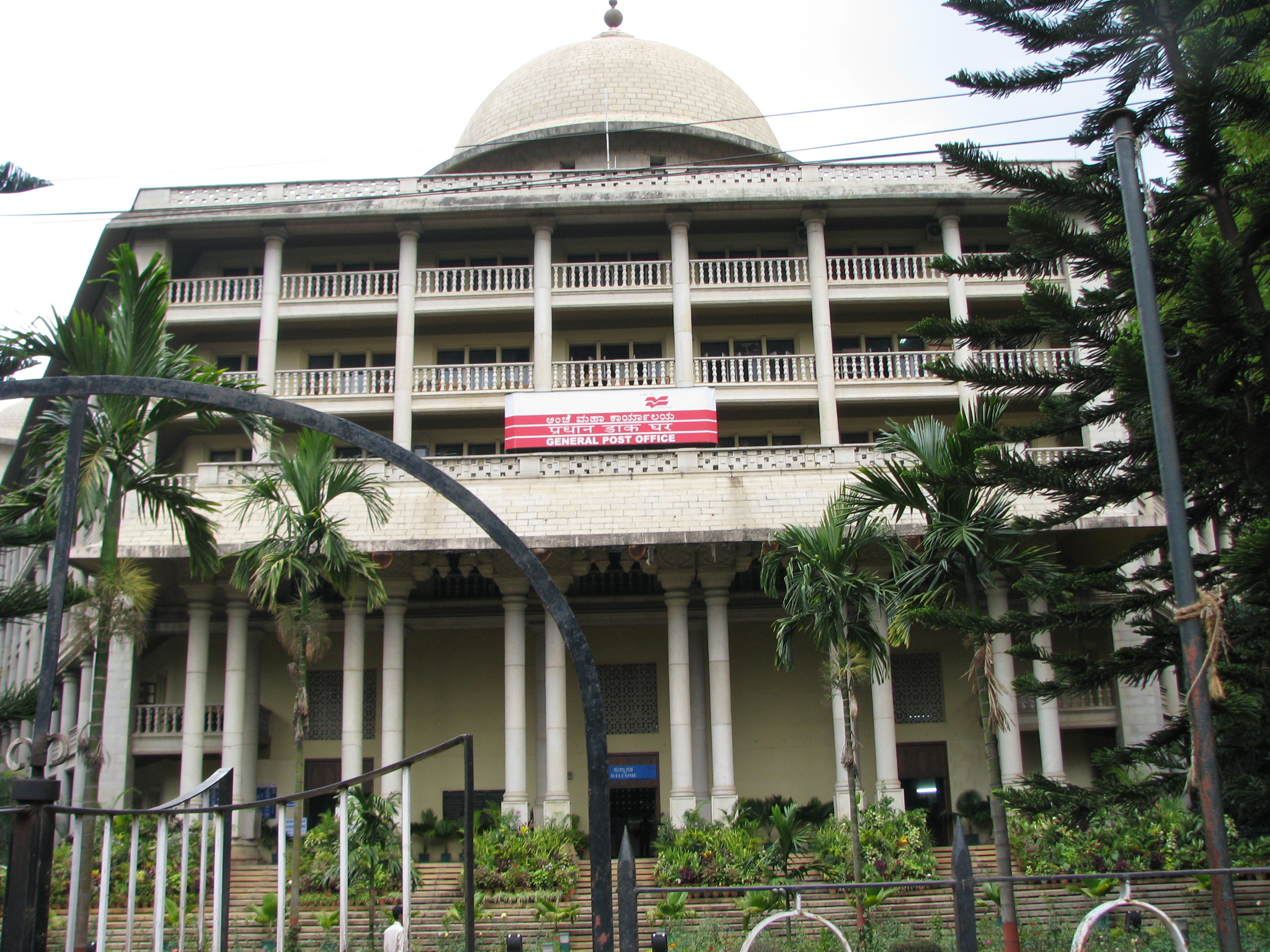
Bengaluru General Post Office was established in 1800

The first post office in the city was established in 1800. Postal services are provided by the government owned India Post, which operated 247 post offices across four zones in 2024. In 1853, telegraph was introduced for long-distance communication and about 538 km (334 mi) of telegraph lines existed in the city by 1856. Telephone services were introduced in 1928. In the early 1990s, STPI provided wired internet services for offices, and VSNL started providing dial up connections for individual homes in the city. Bengaluru has a high internet usage and is amongst the top cities in India in terms of internet penetration.

Bengaluru was the first city in India to have access to fourth generation cellular services. As of 2023, four mobile phone service companies operate GSM networks including Bharti Airtel, BSNL, Vodafone Idea and Reliance Jio offered fourth and fifth generation mobile services. Wired broadband services are offered by five major operators and smaller local operators. Namma Wifi is a free municipal wireless network launched on 24 January 2014 by the Government of Karnataka, and is available in select areas in the city.

=== Media ===
The first printing press in Bengaluru was established in 1840 by the Wesleyan Christian Mission. Around 1860, the English newspaper Bangalore Herald and Kannada newspaper Mysore Vrittanta Bodhini started circulation in Bengaluru. P. R. Ramayya established the Bangalore Press in 1927 and launched the Kannada newspaper Tayi Nadu and English newspaper Daily News later. Bengaluru has several newspapers and magazines published in various languages including Kannada, English, Urdu, and Tamil. As of 2022, the major dailies with a circulation of more than 100,000 copies per day include The Times of India, Vijaya Karnataka, Prajavani, and Vijayavani. Several local newspapers, and periodicals also bring out editions from the city. Local online news sites like Explocity provide local news updates.

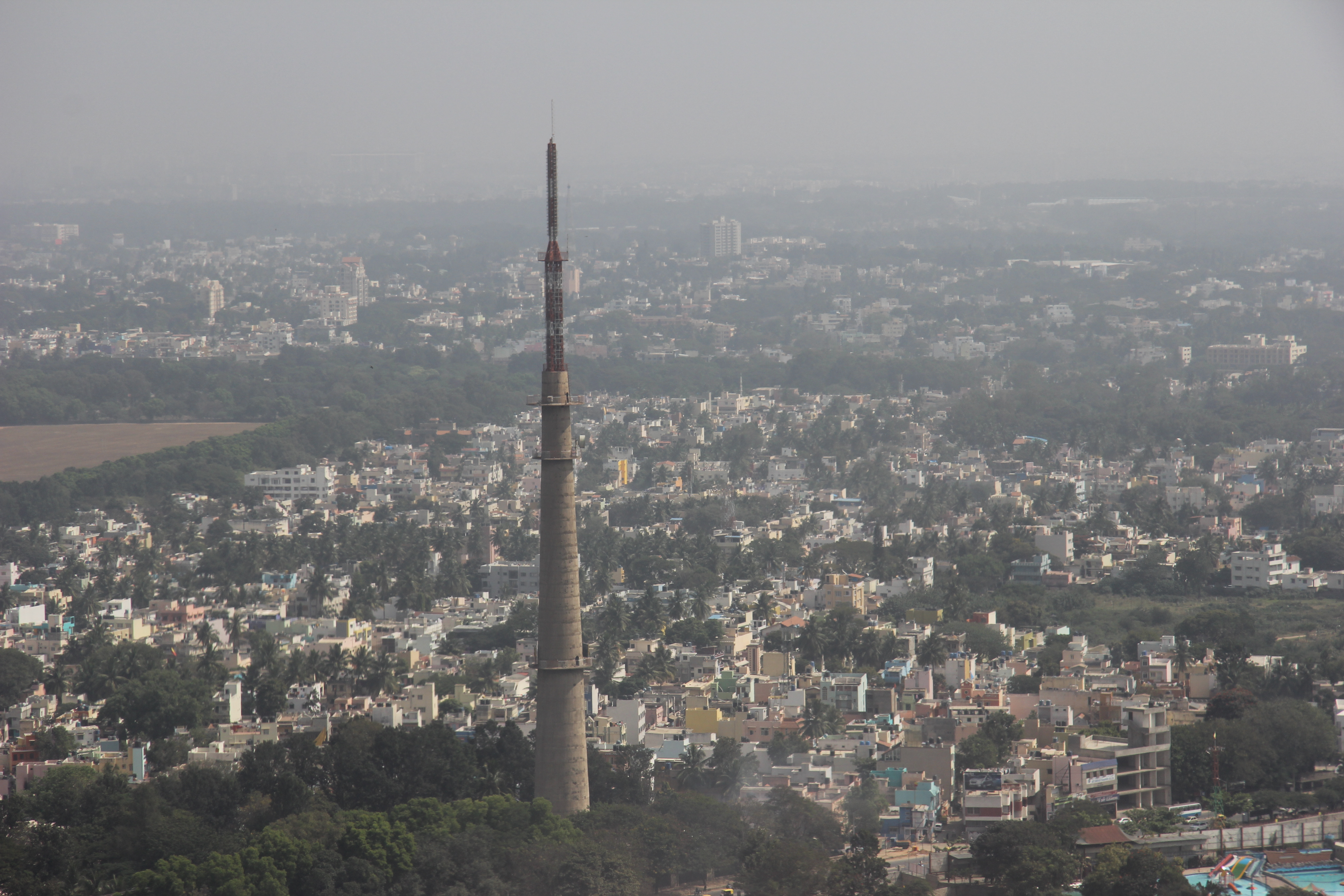
The 140 m (460 ft) high television tower, which was commissioned in 1985

All India Radio started AM broadcasting from its Bengaluru station on 2 November 1955. In 2001, Radio City became the first private FM radio channel in the city. As of 2020, major FM radio stations included BIG FM, Radio Mirchi, Radio City, and Red FM. The Bangalore Amateur Radio Club, an amateur radio club was established in 1959.

The government run Doordarshan broadcasts terrestrial and satellite television channels from its Bengaluru centre set up on 1 November 1981. A production centre was established in the Doordarshan's Bengaluru office in 1983, thereby allowing the introduction of a news programme in Kannada on 19 November 1983. A 140 m (460 ft) high television tower was commissioned on 1 March 1985 for the broadcast of television programmes. Doordarshan launched DD Chandana, a Kannada satellite channel, on 15 August 1990. In September 1991, Star TV was the first private satellite channel to be launched in the city. Since the late 2000s, Direct To Home (DTH) services became available in Bengaluru.

=== Fire and rescue ===
Fire services are handled by the Karnataka Fire and Emergency Services, which operates 50 fire stations, five fire protection squads, and three special units.

== Transport ==
=== Air ===
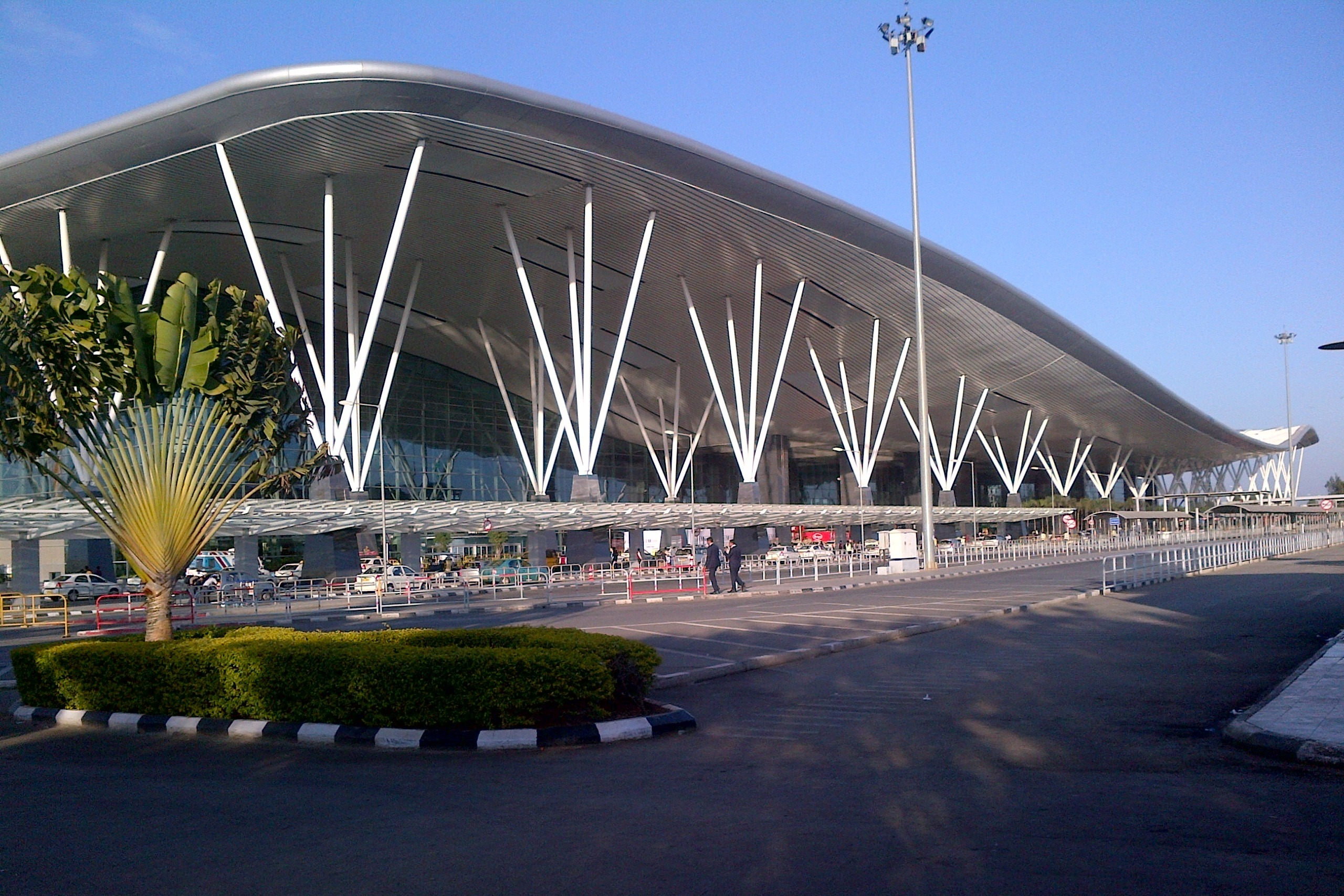
Kempegowda International Airport at Devanahalli

In 1919, the construction of an airfield at the village of Agram started. The aerodrome was recorded being used for joyrides and a flight carrying a British official in the 1930s. In 1939, work was underway on a civil airfield in Jakkur. The airfield received passenger flights in 1940. The HAL airport began operations the following year. It housed the first aircraft factory in India, which was run by Hindustan Aircraft Limited and became a repair centre for Allied planes during World War II. After the war, it became the new civil airport. The HAL airport handled commercial flights until 2008, when Bengaluru International Airport opened at Devanahalli, 31 km (19 mi) from the city. The name of the airport changed to Kempegowda International Airport in 2013. It is the third-busiest airport in India in terms of passenger traffic. Air-conditioned buses operated by Bengaluru Metropolitan Transport Corporation connect the airport with the city.

The Training Command of the Indian Air Force is headquartered in Bengaluru. The Air Force operates an air base at Yelahanka. The city hosts Aero India, a biennial air show at the Yelahanka air force station.

=== Rail ===
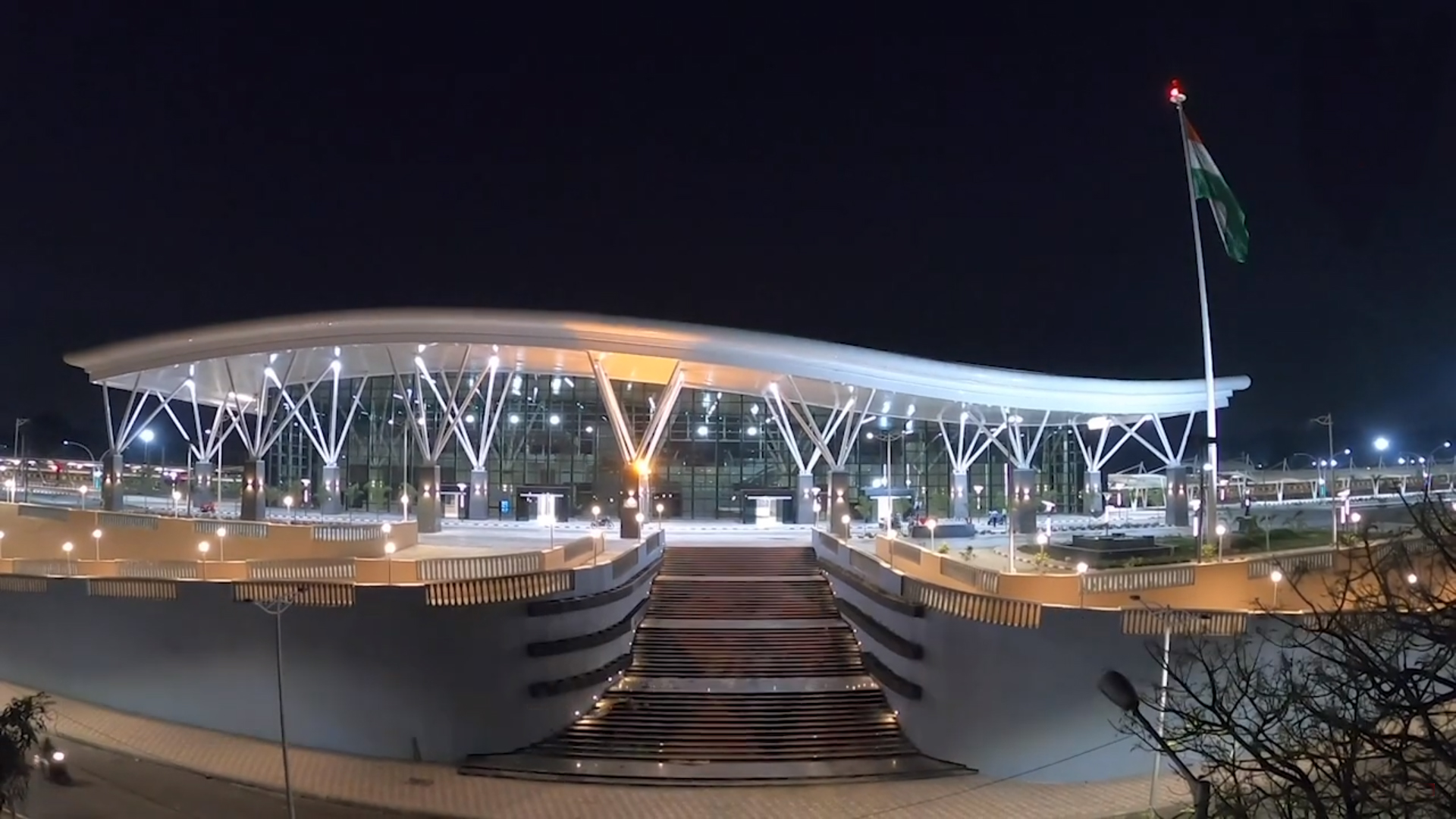
SMVT railway station at Baiyappanahalli

The first railway line opened for traffic between Bengaluru Cantonment and Jolarpettai on 1 August 1864. The Madras-Bangalore Mail was launched later the same year. Further railway connectivity to Renigunta was established in 1862, and to Raichur in 1871. The Yeshwantapur station was established in 1892, when a metre-gauge railway line was established to Doddaballapur. The city was part of the Mysore State Railway, which became part of the Southern Railway zone of the Indian Railways in April 1951. The Bangalore railway division was established in 1971. The city became part of the South Western Railway zone was formed with headquarters in Hubballi in 2003. There are 18 railway stations in the city managed by the Indian Railways, and the major railway stations include Bengaluru City, Yesvantpur, Cantonment, Krishnarajapuram and Baiyappanahalli.

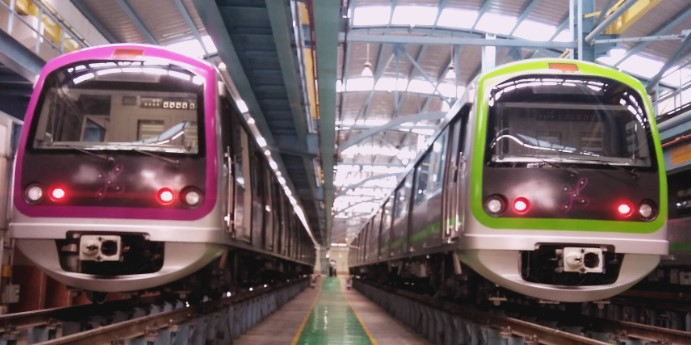
Namma Metro serves the city.

Namma Metro is a rapid transit rail system in the city that was opened in 2011, and was the first operational metro in South India. As of 2025, the metro system consists three operational lines stretching 96.1 km (59.7 mi), and is the second-longest operational metro network in India. Two more lines are under construction and four more are proposed as a part of expansion. As of 2026, Bengaluru does not have a suburban railway network. The Bengaluru Suburban Railway is under construction and the first line is expected to be operational by 2030, though it was originally planned to be completed by October 2026.

=== Road ===
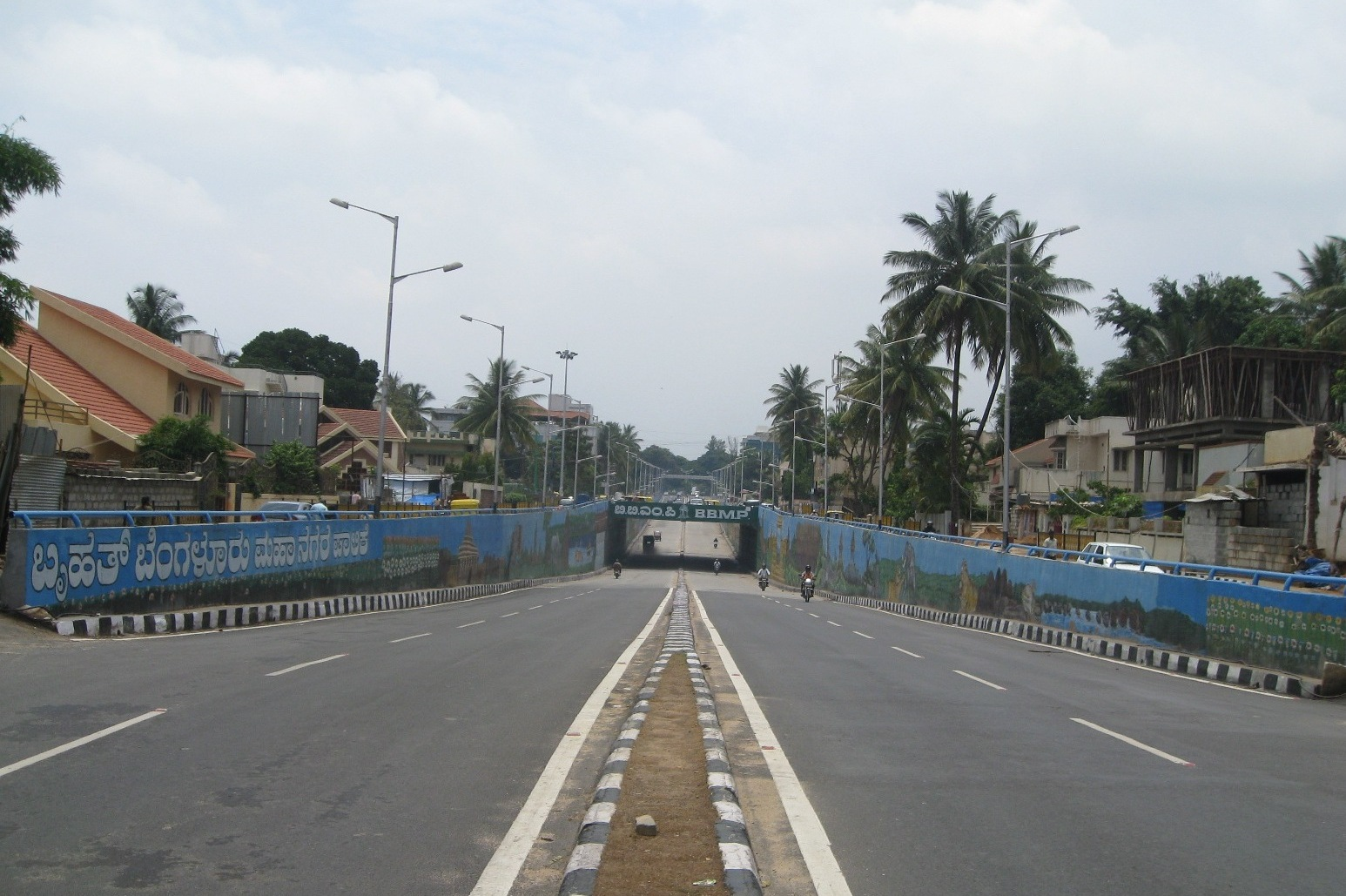
Outer Ring Road, one of the peripheral ring roads in the city

Bengaluru has an extensive road network with about 14,000 km (8,700 mi) of roads as of 2024. The 10 km (6.2 mi) long Inner Ring Road connects Koramangala with Indira Nagar. The Outer Ring Road is a 60 km (37 mi) long peripheral road, developed between 1996 and 2002. The Peripheral Ring Road is a proposed 74 km (46 mi) semi-circular road, connecting major arterial roads. The M G Road is the major arterial road in the central business district. Bengaluru is part of the Golden Quadrilateral highway network, and lies on the Chennai–Mumbai line. The National Highways that connect to the city include: NH-44, NH-48, NH-275, NH-75, NH-648, and NH-948. The Bengaluru–Mysuru Expressway, operational since March 2023, connects the city with Mysuru. The Bengaluru–Chennai Expressway is under construction since August 2019. Two other expressways—Pune–Bengaluru Expressway and Nagpur–Hyderabad–Bengaluru Expressway—have been proposed.

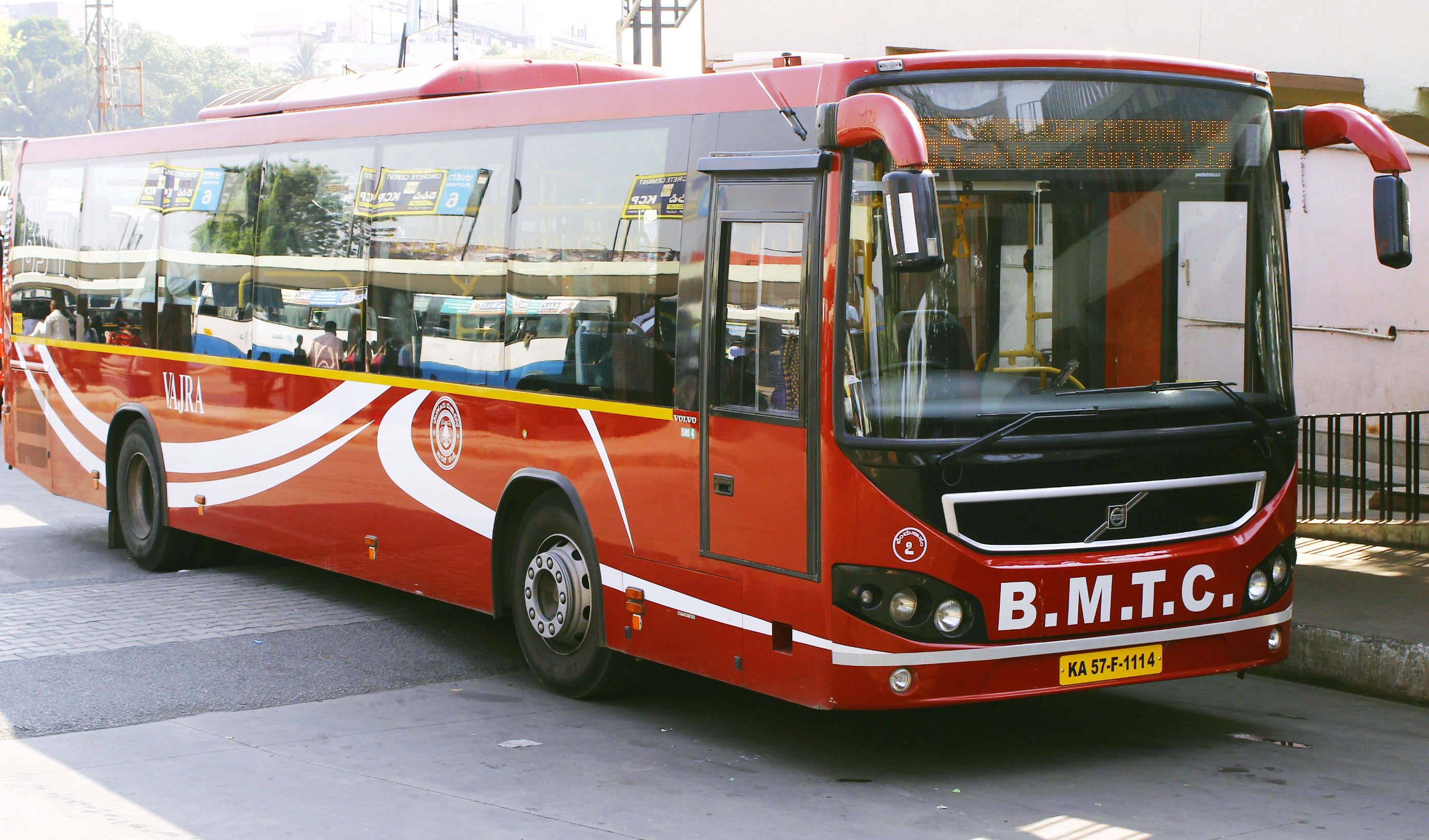
Air-conditioned buses were introduced by the BMTC in 2005

Intra-city bus services is handled by the Bengaluru Metropolitan Transport Corporation (BMTC), which was established in 1997. As of 2024, BMTC operates 57,667 daily trips on 5,766 routes with a fleet of 6,340 buses. There are 48 bus stations, and 50 depots for intra-city bus services. BMTC introduced air-conditioned buses in 2005, which operate on major routes and as shuttle services from various parts of the city to airport. It also operates a fleet of more than 1,100 electric vehicles. Apart from single journey tickets, BMTC issues various passes for frequent users. Inter-city bus transport is handled by the Karnataka State Road Transport Corporation (KSRTC), owned by the Government of Karnataka. KSRTC operates various classes of services connecting other major cities in Karnataka, and other neighbouring states. The major bus stations in the city include Kempegowda Bus Station, Shantinagar Bus Station, and Mysuru Road Bus Station. The other means of road transport in the city include vans, auto rickshaws, on-call metered taxis and tourist taxis.

Motor vehicles were introduced in Bengaluru in 1903. As of March 2022, an average of 1,530 vehicles were registered daily in Regional Transport Offices (RTOs) in the city. As of 2023, the city had nearly ten million vehicles including 7.5 million two-wheelers. The rapid growth of vehicles and unplanned nature of growth has created several administrative problems relating to traffic congestion and infrastructure, resulting in massive traffic gridlocks. The flyovers and one-way traffic systems introduced to address the concerns, were only moderately successful. The city also has considerable air pollution due to vehicle exhaust, and a 2016 study found that over 36% of diesel vehicles operating in the city exceeded the standard limit for emissions.

== Education ==
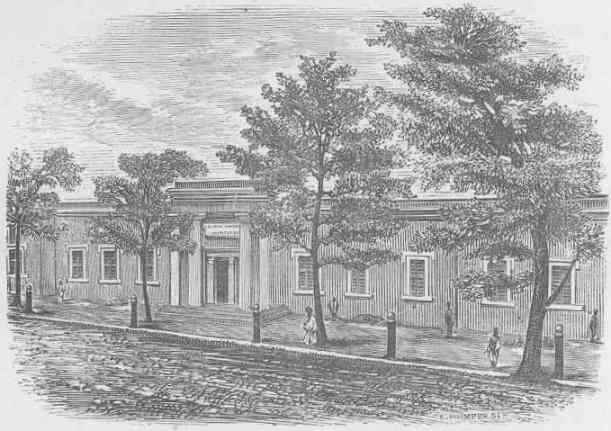
An English school established by London mission in 1869

Bengaluru is a major educational hub and home to some of the premium educational institutions in the country. The city has a 90.33% literacy rate and ranks second among the major Indian metropolitan city centres. As per the 2011 national census, Bengaluru urban had a literacy rate of around 87.7%. Until the early 19th century, education in Bengaluru was mainly run by religious leaders and restricted to students of that religion. In 1841, two native language schools were established by a London mission, and in 1842, Mummadi Krishnaraja Wodeyar established the first English School under the Wesleyan mission, which expanded to five schools by 1954. In 1857, a public education department was established, and the education was formulated as per the Indian educational policy at the time. The Bangalore Military School was established in 1945.

Bengaluru has a mix of public and private schools with the public school system managed by the school education department of Government of Karnataka. Public schools run by the Bengaluru Corporation are all affiliated with the Karnataka Board of Secondary Education, while private schools may be affiliated with either of Karnataka Board of Secondary Education, Central Board of Secondary Education (CBSE), Council for the Indian School Certificate Examinations (ICSE) or National Institute of Open Schooling (NIOS). As of 2024, there are 142 public schools run by the Bengaluru Corporation. The city also has a significant number of international schools due to cater to expats and people employed in the technology sector. School education starts with two years of Kindergarten from age three onwards and then follows the Indian 10+2 plan, ten years of school and two years of pre-university course or higher secondary education. After completing their secondary education, students either attend a pre-university course or continue an equivalent high school course in one of three streams – arts, commerce or science – in various combinations. Alternatively, students can enrol in diploma courses and upon completing the required coursework, students enroll in general or professional degrees in universities through lateral entry.

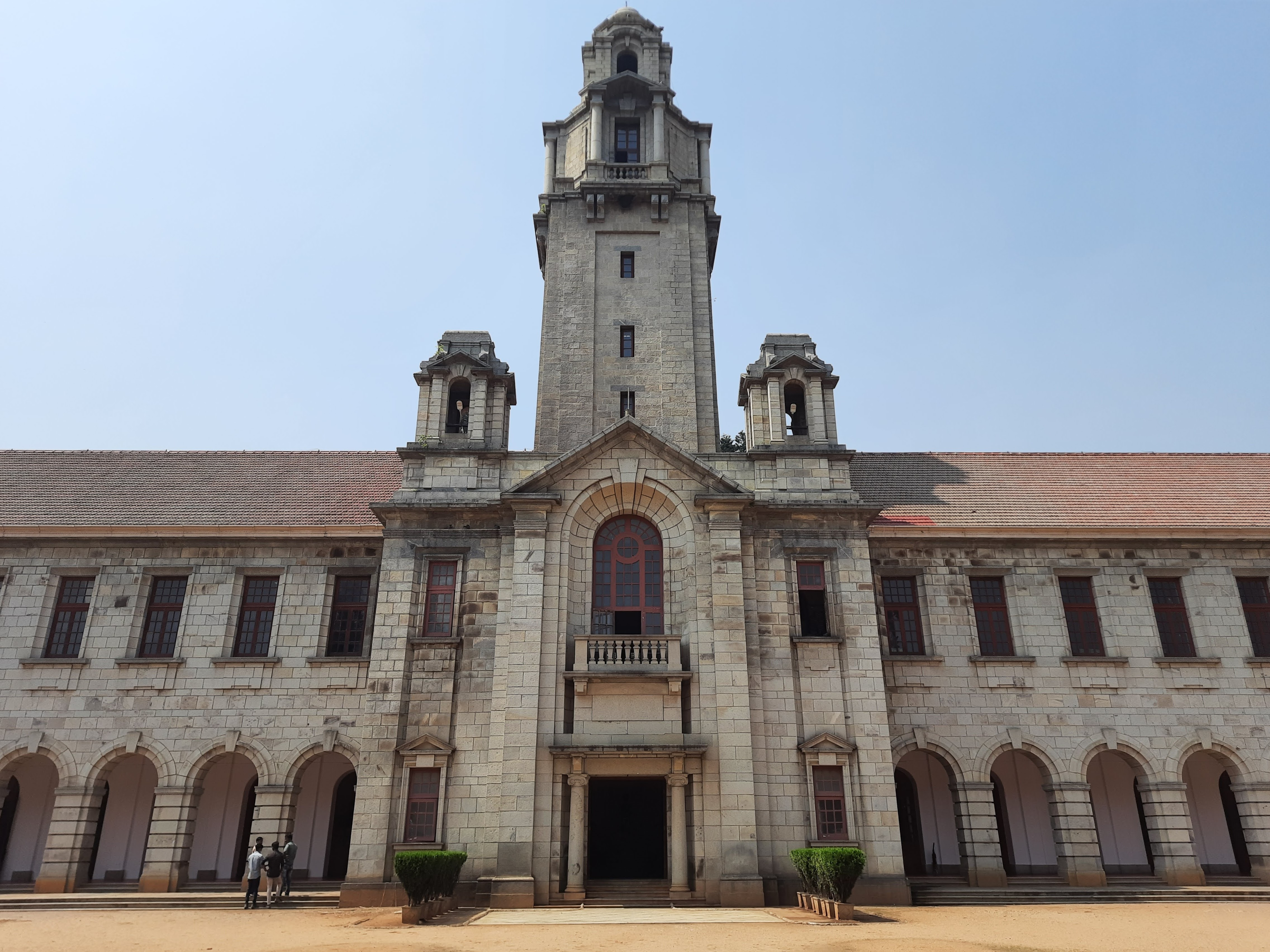
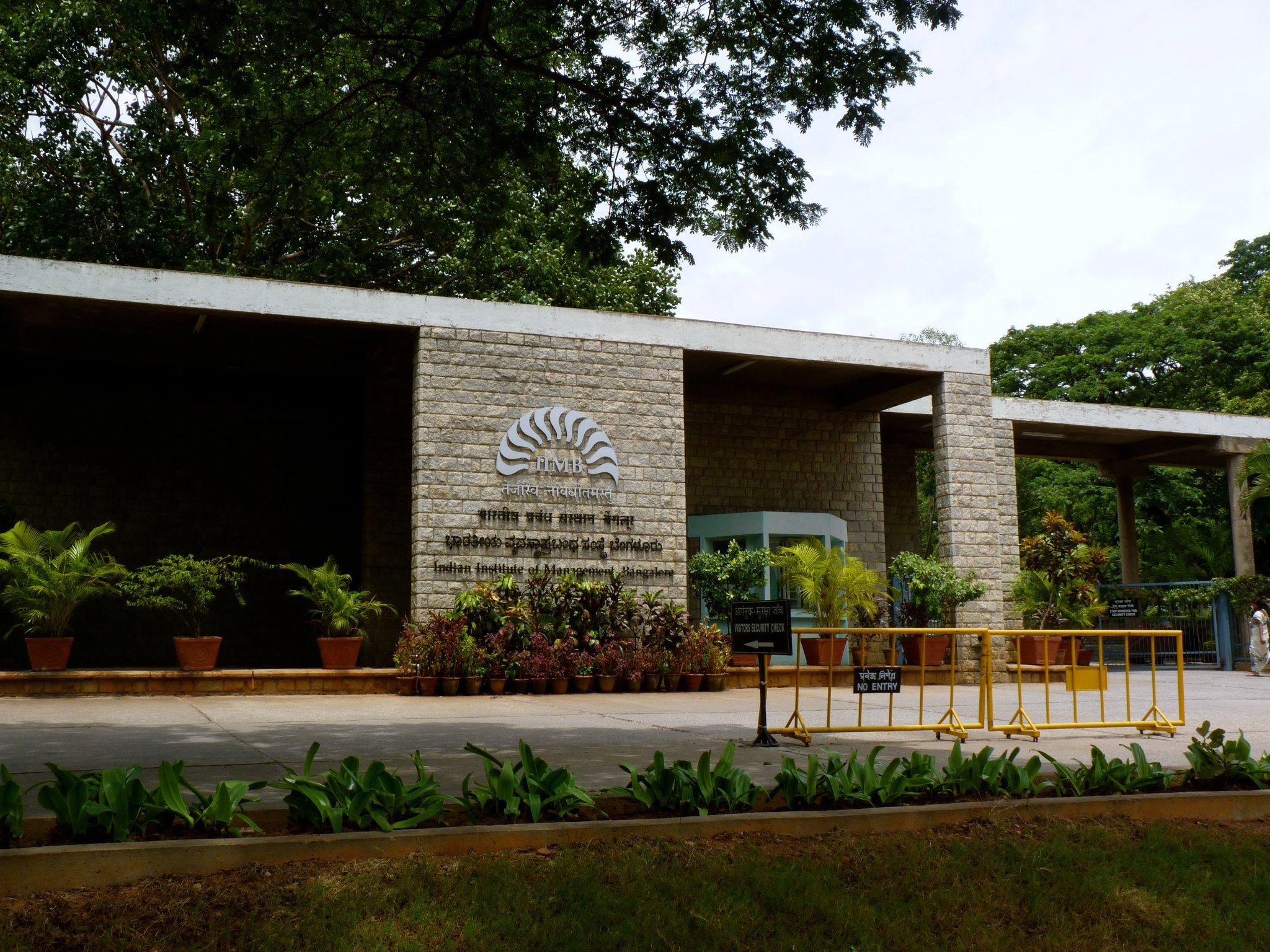
Indian Institute of Science (left) and Indian Institute of Management Bangalore are amongst the premier institutes of higher learning

The oldest institution of higher learning in the city, the Central College, was established as a high school affiliated to Madras University in 1858. The Indian Institute of Science was established in 1909. The Government Engineering College was established as an engineering school in 1913 by M. Visvesvaraya, and was became the first engineering college in the region in 1917, affiliated to Mysore University. As of 2016, the city had six public universities, four deemed universities, eight private universities, 26 medical and dental colleges, 84 engineering colleges, 67 polytechnics, and 64 other institutes of higher learning. The Bangalore University was established in 1964, and had more than 600 affiliated colleges, before being trifurcated into Bengaluru City University and Bengaluru North University in 2017. IIM Bangalore was established as the third Indian Institute of Management in 1972. The National Institute of Mental Health and Neurosciences was established after the amalgamation of the All India Institute of Mental Health and hospital in 1974. The National Law School of India University was the first Indian law university to be established in 1986. Other prominent research institutes in Bengaluru include Jawaharlal Nehru Centre for Advanced Scientific Research, National Centre for Biological Sciences, and National Institute of Advanced Studies. There are 205 public libraries maintained by the department of public libraries. The libraries are divided across the five zones of the city, with a larger Central Public Library located in each of the zones.

== Parks and recreation ==
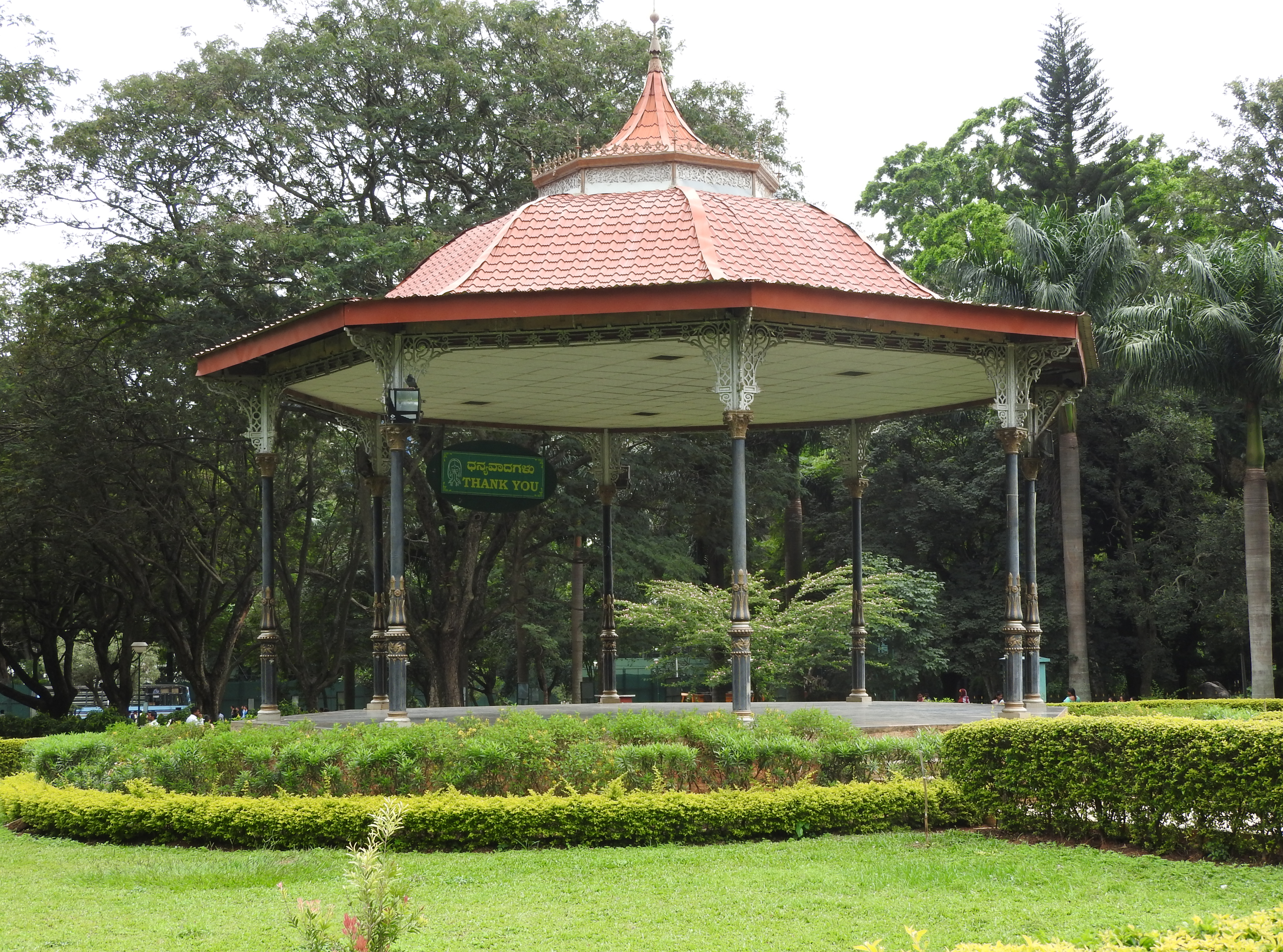
Cubbon Park, established in 1870, is a large park in the centre of the city

Bengaluru is known as the "Garden City of India" because of its greenery. In May 2012, Lonely Planet listed the city as one of the world's top ten cities to visit. As of 2024, Bengaluru has 1,288 public parks maintained by the corporation. The Lal Bagh was established in the 1760s, and was later expanded into a 97 ha (240 acres) botanical garden in the 19th century. It incorporates a hillock made of gneiss, formed billions of years ago, and is a declared national geological monument. The garden has a watch tower built in the 16th century by Kempe Gowda, a glass house built in 1889 on the model of The Crystal Palace in London, old hero stones, and houses many exotic species of plants. A biannual flowershow is held at the gardens during the weeks of India's Republic Day and Independence Day.

The Cubbon Park is a large park spanning 120 ha (300 acres) in the heart of the city, and was established in 1870. It hosts the Bangalore Aquarium, and the Bangalore central library. Bannerghatta National Park is a 260.51 km^{2} (100.58 sq mi) national park and protected area, located south of the city. The old central prison was decommissioned in 2000 and was redeveloped in to Freedom Park.

Elgin Talkies, built in 1896, was the first theatre in Bengaluru. In the later half of the 20th century, the city had 149 single screens, most of them situated along the Kempegowda Road near the Kempegowda Bus Station. In the 21st century, large multiplexes with multiple screens began replacing the single screen theatres, and the city is now home to a large number of multiplexes. Stage plays and dramas of different genres and languages are enacted in theatres across the city.

== Sports ==
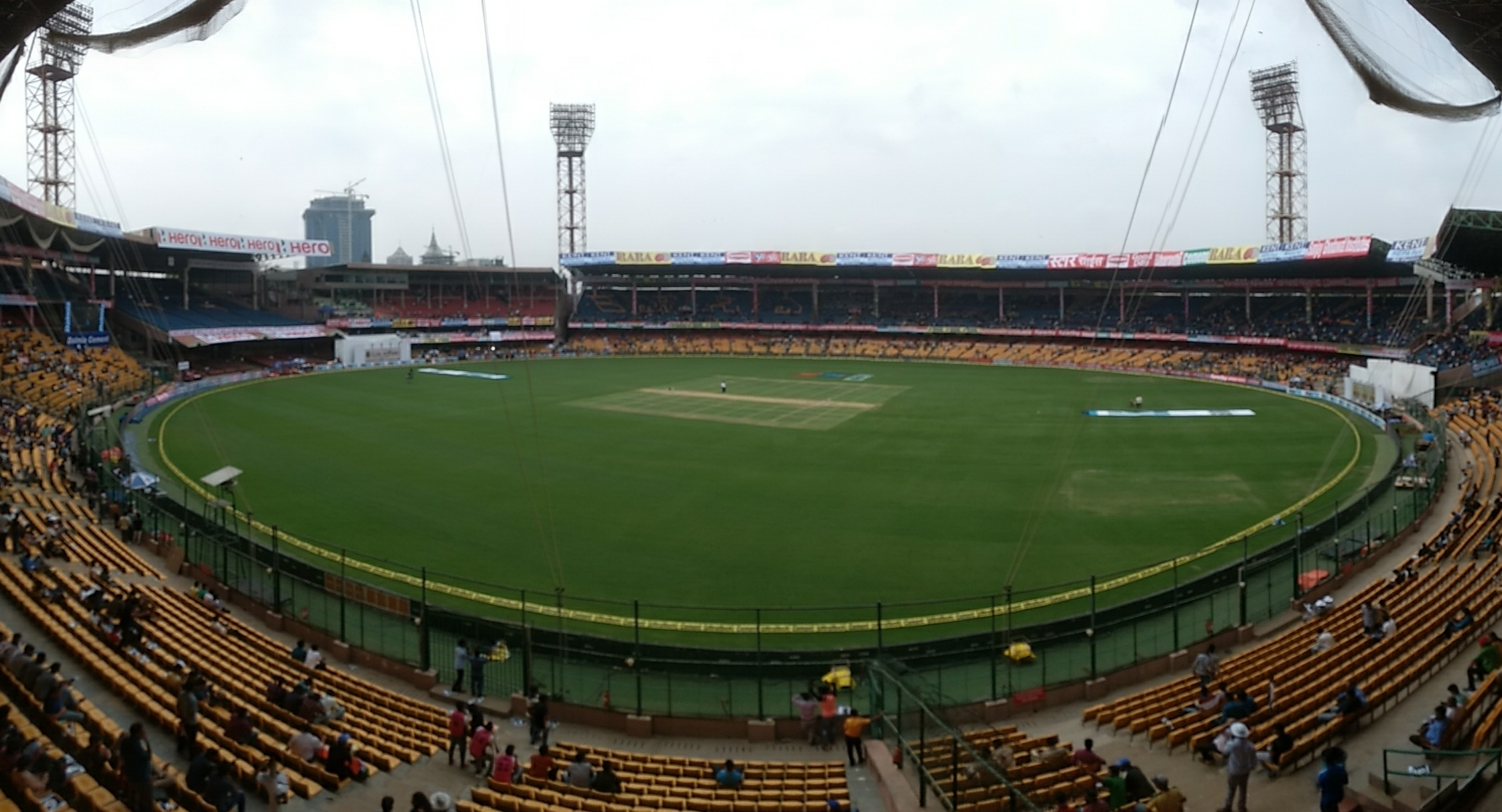
Chinnaswamy Stadium in 2017

Cricket is the most popular sport in the city and the parks in the city serve as venues for impromptu games. M. Chinnaswamy Stadium, established in 1969, is a major international cricketing venue, and has hosted matches during multiple ICC Cricket World Cups. The Karnataka State Cricket Association, located in the stadium premises, is responsible for managing organised cricket in the state. The National Cricket Academy, operated by the Board of Control for Cricket in India, is based out of the city. The city is home to the Indian Premier League (IPL) franchise Royal Challengers Bengaluru. Notable international cricketers born in the city include Erapalli Prasanna, Roger Binny, Anil Kumble, Venkatesh Prasad, Lokesh Rahul, Mayank Agarwal, and Stuart Binny.

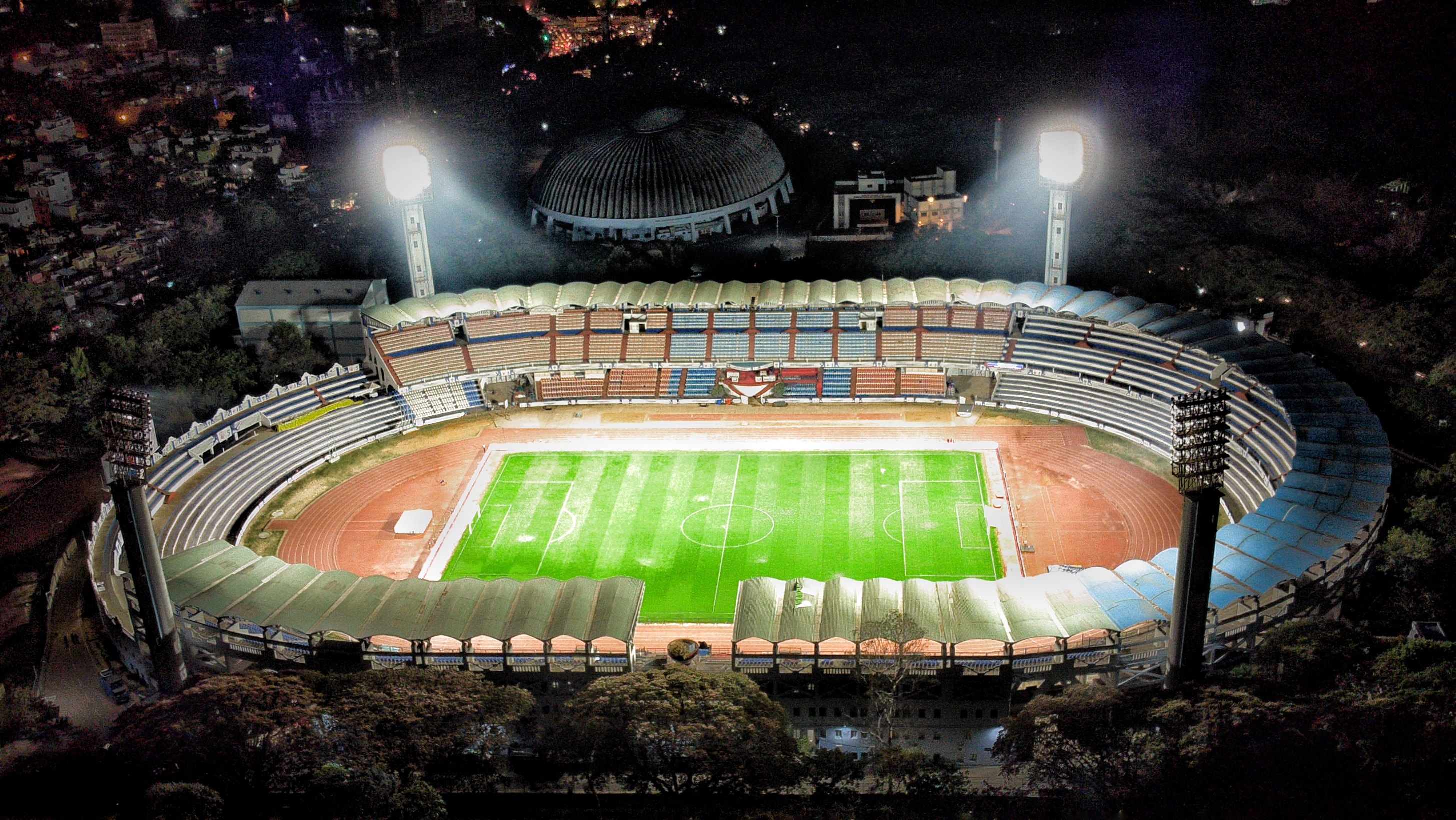
Sree Kanteerava Stadium

Sree Kanteerava Stadium is a multi-purpose venue which hosts football and athletics. Association football also has a significant following in Bengaluru. The Bangalore Football Stadium hosts football matches along with the Kanteerava Stadium. The city is home to Bengaluru FC of the Indian Super League, FC Bengaluru United of the Indian Football League, and the I-League 2 club SC Bengaluru. Prominent international footballers from the city include Sattar Basheer, and Arumainayagam. The Kanteerava Indoor Stadium and Koramangala Indoor Stadium are indoor arenas used to host indoor sports, and other events. The Kanteerva arena hosted the South Asian Basketball Championship in 2015 and 2016. The city is home to Bengaluru Beast of the UBA Pro Basketball League, and Bengaluru Bulls of the Pro Kabaddi League, who also play their home matches at the stadium.

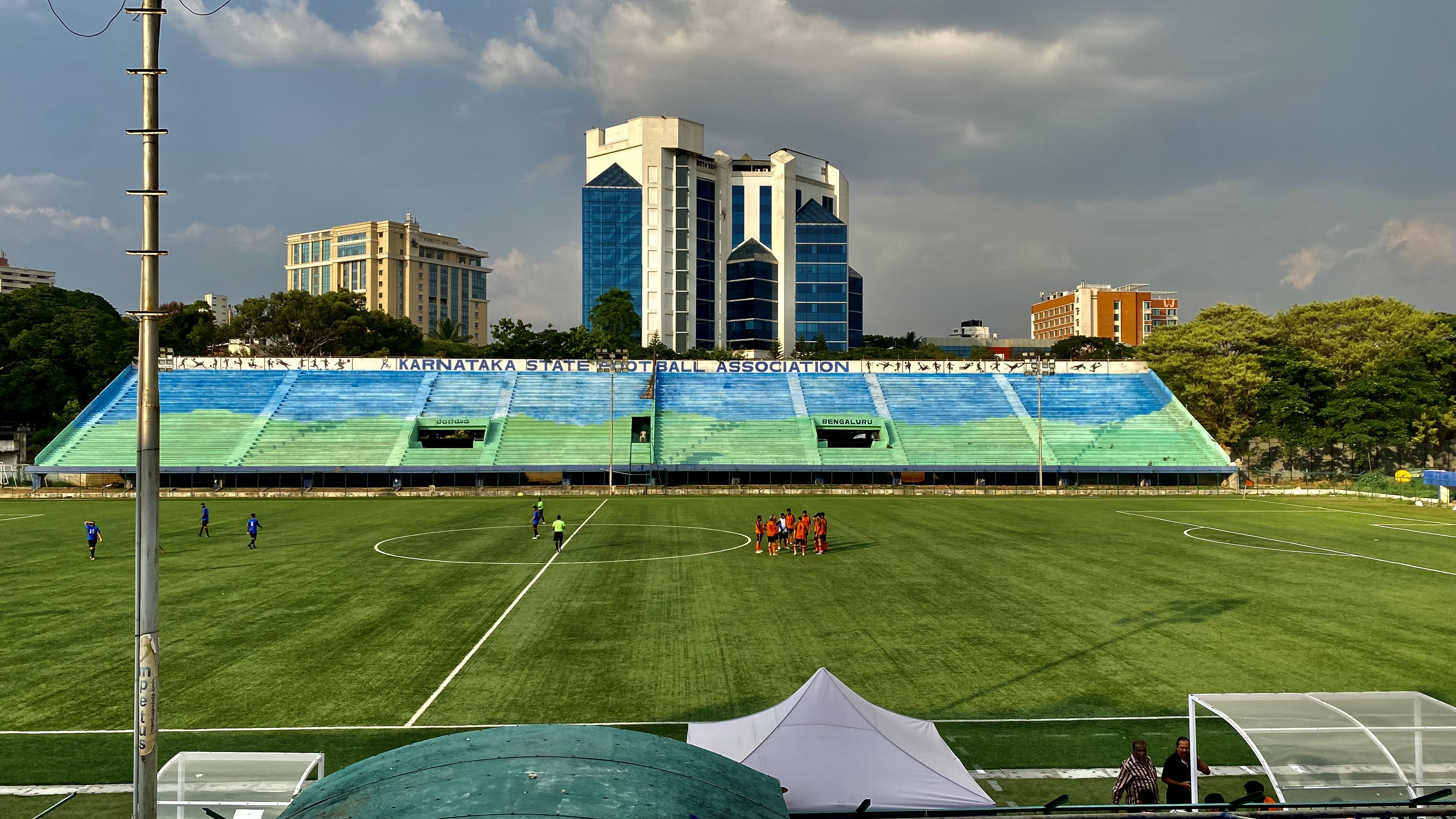
Bangalore Football Stadium

Bengaluru hosts the WTA Indian Open, and Bengaluru Open tennis tournaments annually. Prominent international sports people from the city include tennis grand slam champion Rohan Bopanna, former All England Open badminton champion Prakash Padukone, and former national swimming champion Nisha Millet. Other notable sportsmen who reside in the city include former Indian cricket captain Rahul Dravid, world snooker champion Pankaj Advani, and multiple tennis grand slam champion Mahesh Bhupathi. The city is home to several recreational and sports clubs such as Bangalore Club, Bowring Institute, Bangalore Golf Club and Bangalore Turf Club.

=== City based teams ===
City-based teams
Club	Sport	League	Stadium	Founded
HAL SC	Football	I-League 3	Bangalore Football Stadium	1950
Bangalore Hi-Fliers	Field hockey	Premier Hockey League	Bangalore Hockey Stadium	2005
Royal Challengers Bengaluru	Cricket	Indian Premier League	Chinnaswamy Stadium	2008
Bangalore rugby football club	Rugby	All India & South Asia Rugby Tournament	RBANMS College Ground	2009
Karnataka Lions	Field hockey	World Series Hockey	Bangalore Hockey Stadium	2011
Bangalore Warhawks	American football	Elite Football League of India	HAL Sports Complex	2012
Bengaluru FC	Football	Indian Super League	Sree Kanteerava Stadium	2013
Bengaluru Raptors	Badminton	Premier Badminton League	Koramangala Indoor Stadium	2013
Bengaluru Bulls	Kabaddi	Pro Kabaddi League	Kanteerava Indoor Stadium	2014
Bangalore Raptors	Tennis	Champions Tennis League	KSLTA Tennis Stadium	2014
Bengaluru Beast	Basketball	UBA Pro Basketball League	Kanteerava Indoor Stadium	2015
FC Bengaluru United	Football	Indian Football League	Bangalore Football Stadium	2018
Bengaluru Torpedoes	Volleyball	Prime Volleyball League	Koramangala Indoor Stadium	2021
SC Bengaluru	Football	I-League 2	Bangalore Football Stadium	2022

== Foreign relations ==
Bengaluru has consulates of France, Germany, Israel, and Japan, and a virtual consulate of the United States. The city also hosts a British deputy High Commission, and honorary consulates of Finland, Ireland, Maldives, Peru, and Switzerland. Canada has a trade office in the city.

Bengaluru has a sister city relationship with the following cities:

- Minsk, Belarus (1973)
- Cleveland, United States (1992)
- San Francisco, United States (2008)
- Chengdu, China (2013)

== See also ==
- Namma Metro
- List of tallest buildings in Bengaluru
- List of taluks in Bengaluru Urban district
