= Bengaluru East City Corporation =

Local government of eastern Bengaluru

Bengaluru East City Corporation Beṅgaḷūru Pūrva Nagara Pālike

Type
- Type: Municipal Corporation

History
- Founded: 2 September 2025 (13 months ago)
- Preceded by: Bruhat Bengaluru Mahanagara Palike

Leadership
- Administrator / GBA Chief Commissioner (In absence of Mayor): Maheshwar Rao M., IAS
- Municipal Commissioner: Ramesh D.S., IAS
- Mayor: Vacant, since 2 September 2025
- Deputy Mayor: Vacant, since 2 September 2025
- Leader of the Opposition: Vacant, since 2 September 2025

Structure
- Seats: 50
- Political groups: No corporation council yet elected — all 50 seats vacant pending the 2026 elections

Elections
- Voting system: First-past-the-post
- Last election: New body — no prior election
- Next election: by December 2026

Motto
- Kannada is our breath; Kannada is indeed, evergreen

Meeting place
- Mahadevapura Zonal Office, Mahadevapura, Bengaluru, Karnataka

Website
- Bengaluru East City Corporation

Footnotes
- Governed by: Greater Bengaluru Governance Act, 2024 (Karnataka Act No. 36 of 2025)

The Bengaluru East City Corporation (BECC) is one of the five municipal corporations constituted under the Greater Bengaluru Authority (GBA) to govern the city of Bengaluru, Karnataka, India. It covers the eastern technology corridor of Bengaluru, with its administrative headquarters at Mahadevapura. The BECC was formally constituted on 2 September 2025 by a notification of the Government of Karnataka under the Greater Bengaluru Governance Act, 2024, published in the Karnataka Gazette Extra Ordinary No. 522 (English) and No. 523 (Kannada) of that date, superseding the Bruhat Bengaluru Mahanagara Palike (BBMP) within its area.

The BECC is the largest of the five corporations by area (168 km^{2} (65 sq mi)) but has the fewest wards (50), reflecting the lower population density of Bengaluru's eastern technology corridor compared to the older urban core. It encompasses major IT hubs and rapidly urbanising localities including Mahadevapura, KR Pura, Whitefield, Bellandur, and Varthur. It has 10,41,396 registered voters across 919 polling stations — the lowest voter base among the five corporations. No corporation council has yet been elected; the mayor, deputy mayor and all 50 corporator seats remain vacant pending the 2026 elections, which the Supreme Court of India has directed be held by December 2026.

== History ==
Bengaluru's undivided civic administration was constituted in 1949 as the City of Bangalore Municipal Corporation, renamed the Bangalore City Corporation in 1951, then the Bangalore Mahanagara Palike in 1989, and the Bruhat Bengaluru Mahanagara Palike (BBMP) in 2006 following the annexation of surrounding city municipal councils, town municipal councils, and gram panchayats into an expanded Bengaluru. The BBMP, by then a single 198-ward corporation covering the whole city, was dissolved in 2025 and replaced by five independent City Corporations, of which the BECC is one, coordinated by the newly created Greater Bengaluru Authority (GBA) as an apex body.

=== Greater Bengaluru Governance Act, 2024 ===
The Greater Bengaluru Governance Act, 2024 (Karnataka Act No. 36 of 2025) was enacted by the Karnataka Legislative Assembly and received the assent of the Governor of Karnataka on 23 April 2025, first published in the Karnataka Gazette Extra Ordinary on 24 April 2025. The Act dissolved the BBMP and established the Greater Bengaluru Authority as an apex coordinating body, under which five City Corporations were constituted to independently govern distinct geographic zones of Bengaluru.

=== Preliminary notification and public consultation ===
On 19 July 2025, the Government of Karnataka published Gazette Extra Ordinary No. 403 under notification No.UDD 170 BBS 2025(e), proposing the constitution of five City Corporations with specified boundaries and inviting objections and suggestions from affected persons within thirty days. Following consideration of objections and suggestions, the final notification constituting the corporations was issued on 2 September 2025 and signed by Nandakumar B., Under Secretary to Government, Urban Development Department (BBMP-2 and Coordination).

=== Ward delimitation ===
The Karnataka government conducted a fresh ward delimitation exercise in 2025, replacing the earlier BBMP ward structure. The BECC was assigned 50 wards across a 168 km^{2} (65 sq mi) area — the largest area but fewest wards of all five corporations, reflecting the lower population density and large tracts of peri-urban land in Bengaluru's eastern technology corridor.

=== Constitution of the corporation ===
The BECC came into existence on 2 September 2025 by gazette notification, formally superseding BBMP administration within its area and transferring assets, staff and liabilities to the new corporation under the transitional provisions of the Act.

== Boundaries ==
Wards of the Bengaluru East City Corporation within the Greater Bengaluru Authority area

The boundaries of the BECC were defined in Schedule-I of Gazette Extra Ordinary No. 522 (2 September 2025). The corporation is bounded on the west by the Bengaluru Central City Corporation, on the south-west by the Bengaluru South City Corporation, on the north-west by the Bengaluru North City Corporation, and on the north and east by areas under Bangalore Development Authority (BDA) jurisdiction.

=== West boundary (with Bengaluru Central City Corporation) ===
The western boundary starts at Euphoria Cricket Ground near Koramangala and runs north-west, crossing Choco Club, then north-west via the Embassy Golf Link Road area. It continues north-east past the HAL old airport road area (Dr Rajkumar Road, Suranjan Das Road), then north and north-east along GM Palya Main Road, Kaggadasapura Main Road and Old Madras Road, ending at B Channasandra Graveyard.

=== South-west boundary (with Bengaluru South City Corporation) ===
The south-western boundary begins at Confident Leo and moves north-west via SJR Palazzo City, continuing along Sarjapur-Marathahalli Road, Ambalipura Sarjapur Road, Bellandur Main Road and the Outer Ring Road, ending at Euphoria Cricket Ground.

=== North-west boundary (with Bengaluru North City Corporation) ===
The north-western boundary runs along Bagalur Main Road southward and continues via Hennur Bagalur Road, Horamavu Agara Main Road and Hennur Main Road, ending at the Outer Ring Road (NH44).

=== North and east boundary (with BDA areas) ===
The northern and eastern boundary follows a complex path from Sree Devi Karumariamman Thirukovil (N. Nagenahalli) southward via Hennur Bagalur Main Road and K Channasandra Main Road, tracing the GBA boundary through Whitefield and Varthur toward the Ambalipura-Sarjapur Road, ending at Fresh Menu, Sarjapur Road.

== Governance ==
The BECC provides municipal corporation services within its jurisdiction. Strategic functions across all five corporations — such as inter-zonal transport, drinking water bulk supply, and metropolitan planning — are coordinated by the Greater Bengaluru Authority. No corporation council has yet been elected as of the article's most recent update; administration is carried out by state-appointed officers pending the 2026 elections.

=== Legal and administrative status ===
Predecessor authority / status	Period
City of Bangalore Municipal Corporation	1949–1951
Bangalore City Corporation	1951–1989
Bangalore Mahanagara Palike	1989–2006
Bruhat Bengaluru Mahanagara Palike (undivided, 198 wards)	2006–2025
Constituted as an independent corporation; administered by state-appointed officers pending first election	2 September 2025–present

No corporation council has yet been elected, so there is no political control history to report.

=== Leadership ===
Political leadership of an elected corporation council is vested in the Mayor, assisted by a Deputy Mayor, both elected by the Corporators for a 30-month term. Since no corporation council has yet been elected, the Mayoralty and Deputy Mayoralty have remained vacant since the BECC's constitution. In the interim, administrative leadership has been provided by state-appointed officers:

Officer	Role	From	To
Maheshwar Rao M., IAS	Administrator / GBA Chief Commissioner (in absence of mayor)	2 Sept 2025	incumbent
Ramesh D.S., IAS	Municipal Commissioner	2 Sept 2025	incumbent

=== Composition ===
As the BECC has not yet held a Corporation election, there are no elected political groupings to report. All offices are vacant pending the 2026 elections:

Office	Status
Mayor	Vacant
Deputy Mayor	Vacant
Leader of the Opposition	Vacant
Corporators (50 seats)	All vacant — 0 of 50 filled

The next election is due by December 2026, per Supreme Court direction; the deadline was extended from an earlier 31 August 2026 target because of the ongoing Special Intensive Revision of electoral rolls.

=== Mayor and Deputy Mayor ===
The corporators elect one of their members as mayor and another as deputy mayor at the first meeting of the newly constituted corporation. Both offices carry a term of 30 months (co-terminus with the first half of the five-year corporation council term), with fresh elections held at the mid-term for the remaining 30 months. A no-confidence motion against either officeholder may be moved only after six months from the commencement of their term; once defeated, another cannot be moved for the next six months. The offices are subject to reservation by rotation for Scheduled Castes, Scheduled Tribes, Other Backward Classes and women, as prescribed by the state government. The BECC's corporation council, once elected, will consist of 50 directly elected members (Corporators), one from each ward, elected through the first-past-the-post system, for a term of five years from the date of its first meeting, unless dissolved earlier. Seats are reserved for persons belonging to the Scheduled Castes, Scheduled Tribes, Other Backward Classes and women, as prescribed by the state government; not more than fifty percent of total seats shall be reserved across all categories, and not more than fifty percent of seats reserved for each category shall be reserved for women.

=== Commissioner ===
The commissioner is appointed by the state government and serves as the chief executive officer of the Corporation. The commissioner must be an officer not below the rank of Secretary to the Government and holds office for a term of two years, subject to the pleasure of the Government. The commissioner supervises Joint Commissioners and other subordinate officers, implements resolutions of the City Corporation and the Standing Committees, and conducts all official correspondence between the Corporation and the Government or other authorities.

In the absence of an elected corporation council, the Corporation is administered by the Greater Bengaluru Authority Chief Commissioner acting jointly with the BECC Commissioner.

=== Joint Commissioners (Zonal) ===
For administrative decentralisation, the BECC is divided into zones, each headed by a Joint Commissioner appointed by the state government at a rank not below Deputy Secretary to Government or Karnataka Administrative Service (senior scale). The Joint Commissioner of each zone serves as the nodal authority for civic administration within that zone and coordinates Ward Committees and delegated functions.

=== Standing Committees ===
The Act establishes seven Standing Committees for the BECC, each consisting of a minimum of nine and a maximum of fifteen Corporators (including a chairman elected by committee members). Each Standing Committee has a term of 30 months. The Mayor and Deputy Mayor are ex-officio members of all Standing Committees:

1. Standing Committee for Administration, Education and Social Justice
2. Standing Committee for Revenue and Finance
3. Standing Committee for Public Works and Engineering
4. Standing Committee for Public Health and Disaster Management
5. Standing Committee for Forest, Environment, Ecology, Lakes, Horticulture and Fisheries
6. Standing Committee for Infrastructure
7. Standing Committee for Audit and Accounts

=== Assembly Constituency Level Consultative and Co-ordination Committee ===
For each Vidhan Sabha constituency falling within the BECC, the state government constitutes an Assembly Constituency Level Consultative and Co-ordination Committee chaired by the Member of the Legislative Assembly for that constituency, with the Corporators of that area as members. This body meets at least once a month to coordinate with government agencies, monitor project implementation and address public grievances.

=== Ward Committees ===
Each of the 50 wards has a Ward Committee. The Corporator representing the ward serves as chairperson. The committee consists of 15 members in total — the Chairperson plus 14 others, comprising at least two members from Scheduled Castes or Scheduled Tribes, at least three women, at least two members representing registered Residents' Welfare Associations (active for not less than three years and registered within the ward), and seven members nominated by the Corporation from among the ward's registered voters. The remaining seven members (excluding the seven Corporation nominees) are selected by random draw of lots from eligible applicants. The term of each Ward Committee is 20 months.

=== Ward Sabha ===
Each ward has a Ward Sabha consisting of all persons registered as voters in that ward. The Ward Sabha provides inputs for the formulation of the Annual Ward Development Plan, reviews project implementation, and participates in general ward-level meetings convened by the Ward Committee. The Ward Committee is required to hold the Ward Sabha at least once in every quarter.

== Elections ==
The BECC has 50 wards, each electing one Corporator by first-past-the-post vote for a term co-terminus with the five-year corporation council.

=== 2026 elections ===
The 2026 Greater Bengaluru Authority elections will be the first elections held for all five corporations since the dissolution of the BBMP. The Supreme Court of India initially directed that polls be completed by 31 August 2026, rejecting a Karnataka government request for an extension to September 2026. The Court subsequently extended the deadline a further time, to December 2026, because of the ongoing Special Intensive Revision (SIR) of electoral rolls being carried out by the Election Commission across several states including Karnataka; the enumeration period was extended from 29 July to 8 August 2026, pushing back the publication of the final electoral rolls accordingly. Chief Minister D. K. Shivakumar said the state government would comply with the revised timeline and would not seek any further postponement, stating that all local body elections in the state — including Zilla Panchayat, Taluk Panchayat, Gram Panchayat and municipal corporation polls — would be completed by the end of 2026. All 50 wards of the BECC are scheduled to go to the polls simultaneously, in what will be the corporation's first-ever direct election.

=== Previous: 2015 BBMP election ===
The predecessor election was the 2015 Bruhat Bengaluru Mahanagara Palike election, held on 22 August 2015 for the undivided 198-ward BBMP. The gap of more than eleven years between that election and the 2026 GBA polls represents an unprecedented discontinuity in Bengaluru's municipal electoral history, and means the BECC — like its four sister corporations — begins its existence with no incumbents and no electoral precedent of its own.

== Wards ==
The BECC comprises 50 wards across a 168 km^{2} (65 sq mi) area spanning the eastern technology corridor of Bengaluru — the largest area but fewest wards of all five corporations. The ward boundaries are as notified by the Karnataka Government in November 2025.

=== Assembly constituencies ===
The BECC's 50 wards fall within two Vidhan Sabha (Karnataka Legislative Assembly) constituencies, each with its own Assembly Constituency Level Consultative and Co-ordination Committee. K.R. Pura accounts for the majority of BECC wards, while Mahadevapura covers the remainder, including Whitefield, Marathahalli and Varthur.

Assembly constituency	No. of wards	Wards
K.R. Pura	27	K Narayanapura, Horamavu, Chellakere, Babusab Palya, Hoysala Nagara East, Kalkere, K Chennasandra, Anandapura, Bhattarahalli, Basavanapura, Krishnanagar, Devasandra, Rajarajeshwari Temple Ward, K.R Pura, Ramamurthy Nagara, Kotthur, Vijinapura, Dooravaninagar, K.S. Nissar Ahmed Ward, A Narayanapura, Uday Nagar, Mahadevapura, Sangama Ward, Vignananagara, L.B Shastri Nagar, Jagadish Nagar, Vibhootipura
Mahadevapura	23	Byrathi, Hoodi, Belathur, Kadugodi, Channasandra, S.M Krishna Ward, Kaveri Nagara, Garudachar Palya, Bharath Aikya Ward, Kundalahalli, Whitefield, Hagaduru, Varthur, Munnenkolalu, Priyadarshini Ward, Dodda Nekkundi, Ashwath Nagar, Marathahalli, Yamalur, Bellanduru, Panathur, Shivanasamudra Ward, Gunjur

=== List of wards ===
Wards of the Bengaluru East City Corporation
Ward No.	Ward Name	Ward No.	Ward Name
1	K Narayanapura	26	Jagadish Nagar
2	Horamavu	27	Vibhootipura
3	Chellakere	28	Byrathi
4	Babusab Palya	29	Hoodi
5	Hoysala Nagara East	30	Belathur
6	Kalkere	31	Kadugodi
7	K Chennasandra	32	Channasandra
8	Anandapura	33	S.M Krishna Ward
9	Bhattarahalli	34	Kaveri Nagara
10	Basavanapura	35	Garudachar Palya
11	Krishnanagar	36	Bharath Aikya Ward
12	Devasandra	37	Kundalahalli
13	Rajarajeshwari Temple Ward	38	Whitefield
14	K.R Pura	39	Hagaduru
15	Ramamurthy Nagara	40	Varthur
16	Kotthur	41	Munnenkolalu
17	Vijinapura	42	Priyadarshini Ward
18	Dooravaninagar	43	Dodda Nekkundi
19	K.S. Nissar Ahmed Ward	44	Ashwath Nagar
20	A Narayanapura	45	Marathahalli
21	Uday Nagar	46	Yamalur
22	Mahadevapura	47	Bellanduru
23	Sangama Ward	48	Panathur
24	Vignananagara	49	Shivanasamudra Ward
25	L.B Shastri Nagar	50	Gunjur

== Corporators ==
No Corporators have yet been elected to the BECC; all 50 ward seats are vacant pending the 2026 elections. Once results are declared, this section will list, for each ward, the elected Corporator, their party, and their term of office.

Ward No.	Ward	Corporator	Party	Term of office
1	K Narayanapura	Vacant — pending 2026 election		
2	Horamavu	Vacant — pending 2026 election		
3	Chellakere	Vacant — pending 2026 election		
4	Babusab Palya	Vacant — pending 2026 election		
5	Hoysala Nagara East	Vacant — pending 2026 election		
6	Kalkere	Vacant — pending 2026 election		
7	K Chennasandra	Vacant — pending 2026 election		
8	Anandapura	Vacant — pending 2026 election		
9	Bhattarahalli	Vacant — pending 2026 election		
10	Basavanapura	Vacant — pending 2026 election		
11	Krishnanagar	Vacant — pending 2026 election		
12	Devasandra	Vacant — pending 2026 election		
13	Rajarajeshwari Temple Ward	Vacant — pending 2026 election		
14	K.R Pura	Vacant — pending 2026 election		
15	Ramamurthy Nagara	Vacant — pending 2026 election		
16	Kotthur	Vacant — pending 2026 election		
17	Vijinapura	Vacant — pending 2026 election		
18	Dooravaninagar	Vacant — pending 2026 election		
19	K.S. Nissar Ahmed Ward	Vacant — pending 2026 election		
20	A Narayanapura	Vacant — pending 2026 election		
21	Uday Nagar	Vacant — pending 2026 election		
22	Mahadevapura	Vacant — pending 2026 election		
23	Sangama Ward	Vacant — pending 2026 election		
24	Vignananagara	Vacant — pending 2026 election		
25	L.B Shastri Nagar	Vacant — pending 2026 election		
26	Jagadish Nagar	Vacant — pending 2026 election		
27	Vibhootipura	Vacant — pending 2026 election		
28	Byrathi	Vacant — pending 2026 election		
29	Hoodi	Vacant — pending 2026 election		
30	Belathur	Vacant — pending 2026 election		
31	Kadugodi	Vacant — pending 2026 election		
32	Channasandra	Vacant — pending 2026 election		
33	S.M Krishna Ward	Vacant — pending 2026 election		
34	Kaveri Nagara	Vacant — pending 2026 election		
35	Garudachar Palya	Vacant — pending 2026 election		
36	Bharath Aikya Ward	Vacant — pending 2026 election		
37	Kundalahalli	Vacant — pending 2026 election		
38	Whitefield	Vacant — pending 2026 election		
39	Hagaduru	Vacant — pending 2026 election		
40	Varthur	Vacant — pending 2026 election		
41	Munnenkolalu	Vacant — pending 2026 election		
42	Priyadarshini Ward	Vacant — pending 2026 election		
43	Dodda Nekkundi	Vacant — pending 2026 election		
44	Ashwath Nagar	Vacant — pending 2026 election		
45	Marathahalli	Vacant — pending 2026 election		
46	Yamalur	Vacant — pending 2026 election		
47	Bellanduru	Vacant — pending 2026 election		
48	Panathur	Vacant — pending 2026 election		
49	Shivanasamudra Ward	Vacant — pending 2026 election		
50	Gunjur	Vacant — pending 2026 election		

== Premises ==
The BECC is headquartered at the Mahadevapura Zonal Office in Mahadevapura, which served as a zonal office of the undivided BBMP before the corporation's constitution and was retained as the BECC's seat under the transitional provisions of the Greater Bengaluru Governance Act, 2024.

== Emblem and motto ==
The BECC uses an official logo (coa_pic in the infobox) rather than a heraldic coat of arms, consistent with Indian municipal corporations generally. Its adopted motto, "Kannada is our breath; Kannada is indeed, evergreen", reflects the corporation's use of Kannada-language civic branding, consistent with the naming conventions adopted by the Government of Karnataka for all five GBA corporations and their wards. The emblem was adopted concurrently with the corporation's formal constitution in September 2025.

== Functions and responsibilities ==
The BECC's responsibilities under the Greater Bengaluru Governance Act, 2024 include obligatory functions such as property taxation, building regulation and zoning enforcement, public health and sanitation, solid waste management, maintenance of roads and stormwater drains, street lighting, parks and public spaces, urban forestry, and administration of markets and slaughterhouses. The BECC also coordinates with the Bengaluru Water Supply and Sewerage Board on water supply and sewerage, and with the Bangalore Development Authority and other statutory bodies on land use and development matters.

The City Corporation Fund receives revenues from property tax, professional tax, advertisement charges, service fees, and state and central government grants. Where the BECC cannot generate sufficient revenue for its obligatory functions, the state government provides grants-in-aid on the recommendation of the Karnataka State Finance Commission.

== See also ==
- Greater Bengaluru Authority
- Bruhat Bengaluru Mahanagara Palike
- 2026 Greater Bengaluru Authority elections
- Bengaluru Central City Corporation
- Bengaluru North City Corporation
- Bengaluru South City Corporation
- Bengaluru West City Corporation
- Administrative divisions of Bengaluru
- List of mayors of Bengaluru
