= 2026 Greater Bengaluru Authority elections =

2026 municipal elections in Bengaluru, India

- To be announced (deadline: 31 December 2026)
- Registered: 88,92,528 (As of April 2026)

Party	BJP	INC	JD(S)
Alliance	NDA		NDA

The 2026 Greater Bengaluru Authority elections are the first elections to the five City corporation of the Greater Bengaluru Authority (GBA) in Bengaluru, which replaced the Bruhat Bengaluru Mahanagara Palike (BBMP). In July 2026, the Supreme Court of India extended the deadline for completing the elections to 31 December 2026. The corporations cover 712 km^{2} (275 sq mi) divided into 369 wards, with about 88.9 lakh (8.9 million) registered voters as of April 2026.

Bengaluru has had no elected city council since the previous BBMP council's term lapsed in September 2020; the last city election was the 2015 BBMP election. The Supreme Court has set and extended several deadlines, and the Karnataka government and the GBA cited the ongoing Special Intensive Revision of electoral rolls in seeking the latest extension. The polls are to be held using ballot papers rather than electronic voting machines. In October 2026, the Bharatiya Janata Party and the Janata Dal (Secular) announced that they would contest upcoming elections in Karnataka together under the National Democratic Alliance.

== Background ==
Bengaluru is the capital of Karnataka and one of the most populous cities in India, with a population of 8,443,675 at the 2011 census.

=== Reorganisation of Bengaluru ===
The Greater Bengaluru Governance Act, 2024 (GBG Act) is a Karnataka state law that replaced the erstwhile Bruhat Bengaluru Mahanagara Palike (BBMP) governance structure with a new system centred on the Greater Bengaluru Authority (GBA). The Act came into force in 2025. It replaced the BBMP with an apex authority presiding over five city corporations, each governing a part of Bengaluru. The five corporations were constituted by a state government notification on 2 September 2025.

The new structure required a redrawing of Bengaluru's ward boundaries. The BBMP had 198 wards, and several proposals between 2020 and 2024 sought to increase the number, including a 243-ward structure under the 2020 amendment to the Karnataka municipal corporations law, which was not implemented before the BBMP was replaced. After the BBMP was abolished and the five corporations created, the Karnataka government began a fresh delimitation exercise in 2025. The 198 BBMP wards were expanded to 368 wards across the five corporations, and one ward was subsequently added to BWCC, taking the total to 369.

Statistics of the five Bengaluru city corporations (voter figures as of April 2026)
City Corporation	Headquarters	Abbreviation	Area	No. of wards	Polling stations	Registered voters			
City Corporation	Headquarters	Abbreviation	Area	No. of wards	Polling stations	Men	Women	Others	Total
Bengaluru Central City Corporation	Hudson Circle	BCCC	78 km^{2} (30 sq mi)	63	1,303	7,26,445	6,98,928	303	14,25,676
Bengaluru North City Corporation	Yelahanka	BNCC	158 km^{2} (61 sq mi)	72	1,706	9,94,319	9,59,572	381	19,54,272
Bengaluru South City Corporation	Jayanagar	BSCC	147 km^{2} (57 sq mi)	72	1,614	9,03,348	8,41,040	223	17,44,611
Bengaluru East City Corporation	Mahadevapura	BECC	168 km^{2} (65 sq mi)	50	919	5,49,170	4,91,968	258	10,41,396
Bengaluru West City Corporation	Rajarajeshwari Nagar	BWCC	161 km^{2} (62 sq mi)	112	2,482	13,96,470	13,29,635	468	27,26,573
Greater Bengaluru Authority	Hudson Circle	GBA	712 km^{2} (275 sq mi)	369	8,024	45,69,752	43,21,143	1,633	88,92,528

The totals are the sum of the corporation-wise figures; the source's headline figure is 88.95 lakh.

=== State Election Commission and court orders ===
The Karnataka State Election Commission (KSEC) is responsible for conducting elections to the five city corporations. The BBMP council's term lapsed in September 2020, and Bengaluru has since been without an elected city council. Public interest litigations were filed before the Supreme Court of India seeking the conduct of elections. The Court set successive deadlines for completing the process. In January 2026, it set an initial deadline of 30 June 2026. In May 2026, it extended the deadline to 31 August 2026, rejecting the state government's request for September, and said at the time that this would be the final extension.

In July 2026, the Court granted a further extension to 31 December 2026. The bench, comprising Chief Justice of India Surya Kant and Justices Joymalya Bagchi and V. Mohana, acted after senior advocate Kapil Sibal submitted that the state's ongoing Special Intensive Revision (SIR) of electoral rolls would not conclude until November 2026 and that holding the SIR and the civic polls simultaneously was administratively unworkable. The Court allowed separate pleas from the GBA and the SEC for the extension. In its application of 9 July, the GBA said that the machinery required for the elections was engaged in the SIR, and that Bengaluru accounts for over 1.03 crore (10.3 million) of the state's 5.54 crore (55.4 million) electors. The bench cautioned that no further extension would be granted.

=== Ward reservations ===
Under Section 29 of the Greater Bengaluru Governance Act, 2024 and Government Order UDD 240 BBS 2025 (19 December 2025), wards in the five city corporations are reserved, on the basis of the 2011 census, for Scheduled Castes (SC), Scheduled Tribes (ST), Backward Class "A" and Backward Class "B" candidates, with seats reserved for women within each category. Draft reservations were notified on 8 January 2026, and objections were invited until 23 January 2026. A review committee chaired by the Additional Chief Secretary, Urban Development Department, examined them on 17 February 2026, and the final ward-wise reservation for all five corporations was notified on 7 March 2026. Of the 369 wards, 43 are reserved for SC, 7 for ST, 97 for Backward Class "A" and 24 for Backward Class "B", and 198 are in the general category. In all, 176 seats are reserved for women across categories. The government said that 50 per cent of the wards in every category would be reserved for women; in the final lists, the women's share of each category in each corporation is half of the category's wards, rounded down where the number is odd, which accounts for the total of 176 (47.7% of 369).

Ward reservations across the five Bengaluru city corporations
City Corporation	Total wards	SC	ST	Backward Class "A"	Backward Class "B"	General	Women (all categories)
Bengaluru Central City Corporation	63	11 (5)	1 (â)	15 (7)	4 (2)	32 (16)	30
Bengaluru North City Corporation	72	9 (4)	2 (1)	19 (9)	5 (2)	37 (18)	34
Bengaluru South City Corporation	72	7 (3)	1 (â)	19 (9)	5 (2)	40 (20)	34
Bengaluru East City Corporation	50	7 (3)	1 (â)	14 (7)	3 (1)	25 (12)	23
Bengaluru West City Corporation	112	9 (4)	2 (1)	30 (15)	7 (3)	64 (32)	55
Greater Bengaluru Authority	369	43 (19)	7 (2)	97 (47)	24 (10)	198 (98)	176

Figures in brackets are seats reserved for women within that category; the final column is the total of those seats.

=== Special Intensive Revision of electoral rolls ===
The Election Commission of India (ECI) began the Special Intensive Revision (SIR) of electoral rolls in Karnataka on 30 June 2026, as part of a phased exercise covering 16 states and three Union Territories. Booth Level Officers conduct house-to-house verification of registered electors, covering more than 5.5 crore (55 million) voters in the state. Despite that warning, the Supreme Court granted a further extension in July 2026. A bench comprising Chief Justice of India Surya Kant and Justices Joymalya Bagchi and V. Mohana extended the deadline for completing the GBA elections to 31 December 2026, after senior advocate Kapil Sibal, appearing for the Karnataka government, submitted that the state's ongoing Special Intensive Revision (SIR) of electoral rolls would not conclude until November 2026 and that conducting the SIR and the civic polls simultaneously was administratively unworkable. The bench again cautioned that no further extension would be granted under any circumstances, marking the third deadline set by the Court for the long-delayed civic polls since the previous BBMP council's term lapsed in September 2020.

=== Ward reservations ===
Wards in the five city corporations are reserved for Scheduled Castes (SC), Scheduled Tribes (ST), Backward Class "A" and Backward Class "B" candidates, with seats reserved for women within each category, under Section 29 of the Greater Bengaluru Governance Act, 2024 and the guidelines in Government Order UDD 240 BBS 2025 dated 19 December 2025, on the basis of the 2011 census. Draft reservations were notified on 8 January 2026 and objections were invited until 23 January 2026. A review committee chaired by the Additional Chief Secretary, Urban Development Department, examined them on 17 February 2026, and the final ward-wise reservation for all five corporations was notified on 7 March 2026. Of the 369 wards, 43 are reserved for SC, 7 for ST, 97 for Backward Class "A", 24 for Backward Class "B" and 198 are in the general category, with 176 seats reserved for women across categories.

Ward reservations across the five Bengaluru city corporations
City Corporation	Total wards	SC	ST	Backward Class "A"	Backward Class "B"	General	Women (all categories)
Bengaluru Central City Corporation	63	11 (5)	1 (–)	15 (7)	4 (2)	32 (16)	30
Bengaluru North City Corporation	72	9 (4)	2 (1)	19 (9)	5 (2)	37 (18)	34
Bengaluru South City Corporation	72	7 (3)	1 (–)	19 (9)	5 (2)	40 (20)	34
Bengaluru East City Corporation	50	7 (3)	1 (–)	14 (7)	3 (1)	25 (12)	23
Bengaluru West City Corporation	112	9 (4)	2 (1)	30 (15)	7 (3)	64 (32)	55
Greater Bengaluru Authority	369	43 (19)	7 (2)	97 (47)	24 (10)	198 (98)	176

Figures in brackets are seats reserved for women within that category; the final column is the total of those seats.

=== Political alliances ===
On 5 October 2026, former Chief Minister B. S. Yediyurappa announced in Kalaburagi that the Bharatiya Janata Party (BJP) and the Janata Dal (Secular) (JD(S)) would contest all upcoming elections in Karnataka together under the National Democratic Alliance (NDA) banner, saying that leaders of both parties had agreed to sustain the alliance. He said that NDA candidates would be fielded in the polls.

As a result, the BJP and JD(S) will field common NDA candidates, rather than separate candidates against each other, in the elections to the five city corporations. The announcement was reported as signalling a renewed understanding ahead of the 2028 Karnataka Legislative Assembly election; the alliance's first test was described as the 23 October 2026 elections to four Karnataka Legislative Council constituencies.

Asked who would be chief minister if the alliance came to power, Yediyurappa said that facing the election was the first priority for both parties and that BJP state president B. Y. Vijayendra had already clarified the position on the alliance's leadership.

=== 2026 Special Intensive Revision (SIR) of electoral rolls ===
Concurrent with the run-up to the GBA polls, the Election Commission of India (ECI) launched the Special Intensive Revision (SIR) 2026 of electoral rolls across Karnataka from 30 June 2026, as part of a nationwide, phased exercise covering 16 states and three Union Territories. The exercise involves Booth Level Officers (BLOs) conducting house-to-house verification of every registered elector, covering more than 5.5 crore voters statewide.

The original schedule envisaged enumeration running until 29 July 2026, with a draft roll on 5 August and a final roll by 7 October 2026. This timeline was subsequently revised by the ECI. The draft electoral roll was published on 24 August 2026. Claims and objections were open from 24 August to 23 September 2026, with a separate notice, verification and disposal phase running until 22 October, and the final electoral roll is scheduled for publication on 27 October 2026. This revised timeline falls within the Supreme Court's extended 31 December 2026 deadline for completing the GBA civic polls.

==== Process ====
A central element of SIR 2026 is progeny mapping, under which every current elector's 2025 electoral roll entry is cross-checked against the last intensive revision, conducted in 2002–2003, to identify duplicate or "ghost" entries; electors who cannot locate their own 2002 record are required to submit the corresponding details of a parent or grandparent instead. The exercise particularly targets the removal of deceased voters and duplicate names, including citizens who have migrated and remain registered as voters in more than one location. Newly eligible electors register using Form 6, corrections to existing entries (including a change of address within the same constituency) are made using Form 8, and objections to entries or requests for deletion are filed using Form 7; no supporting documents are collected during the initial enumeration phase itself. Electors whose earlier roll details could not be mapped, or contained a logical discrepancy, are issued notices and must appear for a hearing before the electoral registration officer, who can reschedule a missed hearing once; a name cannot be removed without notice, a hearing and a reasoned order.

==== Urban impact ====
Reporting on the ground-level conduct of SIR in Karnataka has identified overburdened BLOs, outdated records, and the verification of migrant populations as recurring challenges, particularly in high-mobility urban areas. When the draft roll was published on 24 August 2026, it contained 4.46 crore electors against 5.54 crore on the roll of 16 June; about 1.07 crore entries (19.48%) were placed in the "absent, shifted, dead, duplicate and others" (ASDDO) category and left out of the draft, and 43.81 lakh electors were to be sent notices. In the Greater Bengaluru Authority area, 46.88 lakh electors (about 45.13% of the 1.04 crore recorded on 16 June) were classified under the ASDDO categories; the proportion was highest in the Bommanahalli Assembly constituency (54.83%) and lowest in Yelahanka (36.02%). Electors left out of the draft could seek inclusion by filing Form 6.

==== Political reactions ====
The conduct of the exercise in Karnataka drew criticism from the Bharatiya Janata Party and the Janata Dal (Secular). On 6 July 2026, a joint BJP–JD(S) delegation — including Union minister and JD(S) leader H. D. Kumaraswamy and Leader of the Opposition in the Karnataka Legislative Assembly R. Ashoka — submitted a complaint to Chief Electoral Officer V. Anbukumar, alleging that BLOs were bypassing mandatory door-to-door verification and instead filling enumeration forms at community halls, places of worship, and BLO residences, and sought an inquiry and fresh verification. Chief Minister D. K. Shivakumar rejected the allegations and denied government interference in the process, while KPCC president B. K. Hariprasad defended the use of public venues for form-filling as permitted under ECI guidelines and separately alleged attempts by BJP Booth Level Agents to influence voters. Separately, JD(S) Youth Wing state president Nikhil Kumaraswamy alleged procedural violations in the Ramanagara Assembly constituency, and BJP leader C. T. Ravi alleged that voters in Chikkamagaluru Assembly constituency had been adversely affected.

On 5 October 2026, the BJP and JD(S) announced that they would contest upcoming elections jointly under the NDA (see #Political alliances).

== List of Elections ==
City Corporation	Elections	Type of Election	Term Period	Scheduled
Bengaluru Central City Corporation	2026 Bengaluru Central City Corporation elections	Direct via First-Past-the-Post (FPTP) voting system	5 years or 60 months	By 31 December 2026
Bengaluru Central City Corporation	2026 Bengaluru Central City Mayoral and Deputy-Mayoral elections	Indirect via the members of the corporation	2.5 years or 30 months	TBA
Bengaluru Central City Corporation	2029 Bengaluru Central City Mayoral and Deputy-Mayoral elections	Indirect via the members of the corporation	2.5 years or 30 months	TBA
Bengaluru North City Corporation	2026 Bengaluru North City Corporation elections	Direct via First-Past-the-Post (FPTP) voting system	5 years or 60 months	By 31 December 2026
Bengaluru North City Corporation	2026 Bengaluru North City Mayoral and Deputy-Mayoral elections	Indirect via the members of the corporation	2.5 years or 30 months	TBA
Bengaluru North City Corporation	2029 Bengaluru North City Mayoral and Deputy-Mayoral elections	Indirect via the members of the corporation	2.5 years or 30 months	TBA
Bengaluru South City Corporation	2026 Bengaluru South City Corporation elections	Direct via First-Past-the-Post (FPTP) voting system	5 years or 60 months	By 31 December 2026
Bengaluru South City Corporation	2026 Bengaluru South City Mayoral and Deputy-Mayoral elections	Indirect via the members of the corporation	2.5 years or 30 months	TBA
Bengaluru South City Corporation	2029 Bengaluru South City Mayoral and Deputy-Mayoral elections	Indirect via the members of the corporation	2.5 years or 30 months	TBA
Bengaluru East City Corporation	2026 Bengaluru East City Corporation elections	Direct via First-Past-the-Post (FPTP) voting system	5 years or 60 months	By 31 December 2026
Bengaluru East City Corporation	2026 Bengaluru East City Mayoral and Deputy-Mayoral elections	Indirect via the members of the corporation	2.5 years or 30 months	TBA
Bengaluru East City Corporation	2029 Bengaluru East City Mayoral and Deputy-Mayoral elections	Indirect via the members of the corporation	2.5 years or 30 months	TBA
Bengaluru West City Corporation	2026 Bengaluru West City Corporation elections	Direct via First-Past-the-Post (FPTP) voting system	5 years or 60 months	By 31 December 2026
Bengaluru West City Corporation	2026 Bengaluru West City Mayoral and Deputy-Mayoral elections	Indirect via the members of the corporation	2.5 years or 30 months	TBA
Bengaluru West City Corporation	2029 Bengaluru West City Mayoral and Deputy-Mayoral elections	Indirect via the members of the corporation	2.5 years or 30 months	TBA

== Bengaluru Central City Corporation (BCCC) ==
2026 Bengaluru Central City Corporation elections
- By December 31, 2026

All 63 wards in Bengaluru Central City Corporation 32 seats needed for a majority
- Registered: 14,25,676

	Majority party	Minority party	Third party
Party	BJP	INC	JD(S)
Alliance	NDA		NDA
BBMP majority before election
Council Abolished
Elected BCCC majority
TBE

=== 2026 Bengaluru Central City Corporation elections ===
The 2026 Bengaluru Central City Corporation elections are scheduled to be held by 31 December 2026 in all 63 Wards. It is one of the five newly established City Corporations under the apex body Greater Bengaluru Authority with seat of government in Hudson Circle.

==== Schedule ====
Poll Event	Date
Date for Notification of Election	TBD
Last date for filing nominations	TBD
Date for scrutiny of nominations	TBD
Last date for withdrawal of candidatures	TBD
Date of poll	TBD
Date of Repoll wherever necessary	TBD
Date of counting	TBD
Date before which the election shall be completed	31 December 2026

==== Parties ====
The BJP and JD(S) are contesting as part of the NDA.

Party	Flag	Symbol	Photo	Leader	Seats contested
Indian National Congress					
National Democratic Alliance (NDA)
Bharatiya Janata Party					
Janata Dal (Secular)					

==== Candidates ====
The BJP and JD(S) are contesting jointly under the NDA, so a single NDA candidate will be fielded in each ward. Reservation: GEN = General, SC = Scheduled Caste, ST = Scheduled Tribe, BC-A and BC-B = Backward Class "A" and "B"; (W) = seat reserved for women.

Ward			National Democratic Alliance		Indian National Congress	
#	Name	Reservation	Party	Candidate	Party	Candidate
1	Ramaswamy Palya	GEN (W)			INC	
2	Jayamahal	SC			INC	
3	Vasanth Nagar	BC-A (W)			INC	
4	Sampangirama Nagar	BC-A (W)			INC	
5	Shivajinagar	GEN			INC	
6	Bharathi Nagar	GEN (W)			INC	
7	K Kamaraj Ward	GEN (W)			INC	
8	Halasuru	SC (W)			INC	
9	Hoysala Nagara Central	SC			INC	
10	Cox Town	GEN			INC	
11	Old Baiyappanahalli	SC (W)			INC	
12	Kasturi Nagar	BC-B			INC	
13	Krishnaiahnapalya	BC-A (W)			INC	
14	Nagavarapalya	GEN			INC	
15	Indiranagar	GEN (W)			INC	
16	New Thippasandra	GEN (W)			INC	
17	Kaggadasapura	BC-A			INC	
18	G.M Palya	GEN (W)			INC	
19	Jeevan Bhimanagar	BC-A			INC	
20	Kodihalli	GEN			INC	
21	Konena Agrahara	GEN (W)			INC	
22	Domluru	BC-B (W)			INC	
23	Jogpalya	GEN (W)			INC	
24	Agaram	SC			INC	
25	Ashokanagar	BC-B (W)			INC	
26	Vannarpet	ST			INC	
27	Ambedkarnagar	SC			INC	
28	Neelasandra	BC-A (W)			INC	
29	Austin Town	BC-A			INC	
30	Vinayakanagar	GEN (W)			INC	
31	Shanthinagar	BC-B			INC	
32	Silver Jubilee Park Ward	SC (W)			INC	
33	Dharmaraya Swamy Temple Ward	GEN (W)			INC	
34	D.V Gundappa Ward	GEN			INC	
35	Hombegowda Nagara	GEN			INC	
36	Someshwara Nagara	GEN (W)			INC	
37	BHEL Ward	BC-A			INC	
38	Kanakanapalya	BC-A			INC	
39	Venkat Reddy Nagara	GEN			INC	
40	Ashoka Pillar	GEN			INC	
41	V.V Puram	GEN (W)			INC	
42	Sunkenahalli	GEN (W)			INC	
43	Devaraj Urs Ward	GEN			INC	
44	Chamarajpet	GEN			INC	
45	K.R Market	BC-A			INC	
46	Cheluvadi Palya	SC (W)			INC	
47	IPD Salappa Ward	SC (W)			INC	
48	Azad Nagar	GEN			INC	
49	Kasturbha Nagar	BC-A (W)			INC	
50	JJR Nagara	GEN (W)			INC	
51	Old Guddadahalli	GEN (W)			INC	
52	Padarayanapura	GEN			INC	
53	Rayapuram	SC			INC	
54	Binnypete	GEN			INC	
55	Bhuvaneshwari Nagar	BC-A			INC	
56	Gopalpura	BC-A			INC	
57	Cottonpete	GEN			INC	
58	Chickpete	GEN (W)			INC	
59	Nehru Nagar	BC-A (W)			INC	
60	Seshadripuram	GEN			INC	
61	Dattatreya Ward	GEN			INC	
62	Swatantra Palya Ward	SC			INC	
63	Okalipuram	BC-A (W)			INC	

==== Opinion and exit polls ====
Opinion Polls
Polling agency				Lead
Polling agency	NDA	INC	Others	Lead
Actual result				

Exit Polls
Polling agency				Lead
Polling agency	NDA	INC	Others	Lead
Actual result				

==== Results ====
===== Results by parties =====
Party	Symbol	Seats won	Seats +/−	Vote %
Indian National Congress				
National Democratic Alliance (NDA)
Bharatiya Janata Party				
Janata Dal (Secular)				
Others				
Total		63	-	

===== Results by wards =====
Ward		Turnout	Winner				Runner-up				Margin
No.	Name	%	Candidate	Party	Votes	%	Candidate	Party	Votes	%	Margin
1	Ramaswamy Palya										
2	Jayamahal										
3	Vasanth Nagar										
4	Sampangirama Nagar										
5	Shivajinagar										
6	Bharathi Nagar										
7	K Kamaraj Ward										
8	Halasuru										
9	Hoysala Nagara Central										
10	Cox Town										
11	Old Baiyappanahalli										
12	Kasturi Nagar										
13	Krishnaiahnapalya										
14	Nagavarapalya										
15	Indiranagar										
16	New Thippasandra										
17	Kaggadasapura										
18	G.M Palya										
19	Jeevan Bhimanagar										
20	Kodihalli										
21	Konena Agrahara										
22	Domluru										
23	Jogpalya										
24	Agaram										
25	Ashokanagar										
26	Vannarpet										
27	Ambedkarnagar										
28	Neelasandra										
29	Austin Town										
30	Vinayakanagar										
31	Shanthinagar										
32	Silver Jubilee Park Ward										
33	Dharmaraya Swamy Temple Ward										
34	D.V Gundappa Ward										
35	Hombegowda Nagara										
36	Someshwara Nagara										
37	BHEL Ward										
38	Kanakanapalya										
39	Venkat Reddy Nagara										
40	Ashoka Pillar										
41	V.V Puram										
42	Sunkenahalli										
43	Devaraj Urs Ward										
44	Chamarajpet										
45	K.R Market										
46	Cheluvadi Palya										
47	IPD Salappa Ward										
48	Azad Nagar										
49	Kasturbha Nagar										
50	JJR Nagara										
51	Old Guddadahalli										
52	Padarayanapura										
53	Rayapuram										
54	Binnypete										
55	Bhuvaneshwari Nagar										
56	Gopalpura										
57	Cottonpete										
58	Chickpete										
59	Nehru Nagar										
60	Seshadripuram										
61	Dattatreya Ward										
62	Swatantra Palya Ward										
63	Okalipuram										

=== 2026 Bengaluru Central City Mayoral and Deputy-Mayoral elections ===
The 2026 Bengaluru Central City Mayoral and Deputy-Mayoral elections are scheduled to be held in 2026 after the corporation elections the same year. The 63 Ward corporators will elect the Mayor and Deputy-Mayor of the corporation for a term period of 30 months, being the first half of the Corporation's 5-year term.

2026 Bengaluru Central City Mayoral Election
Party	Candidate	Votes	%	±%
NDA	TBA			
INC	TBA			
Others	TBA			
Absentee				
Margin of victory				
Turnout				
Total valid votes				
Registered electors		63		
TBE gain from TBE				

2026 Bengaluru Central City Deputy-Mayoral Election
Party	Candidate	Votes	%	±%
NDA	TBA			
INC	TBA			
Others	TBA			
Absentee				
Margin of victory				
Turnout				
Total valid votes				
Registered electors		63		
TBE gain from TBE				

=== 2029 Bengaluru Central City Mayoral and Deputy-Mayoral elections ===
The 2029 Bengaluru Central City Mayoral and Deputy-Mayoral elections are scheduled to be held in 2029, at the mid-term of the corporation. The 63 Ward corporators will elect the Mayor and Deputy-Mayor of the corporation for a term period of 30 months, being the second half of the Corporation's 5-year term.

2029 Bengaluru Central City Mayoral Election
Party	Candidate	Votes	%	±%
NDA	TBA			
INC	TBA			
Others	TBA			
Absentee				
Margin of victory				
Turnout				
Total valid votes				
Registered electors		63		
TBE gain from TBE				

2029 Bengaluru Central City Deputy-Mayoral Election
Party	Candidate	Votes	%	±%
NDA	TBA			
INC	TBA			
Others	TBA			
Absentee				
Margin of victory				
Turnout				
Total valid votes				
Registered electors		63		
TBE gain from TBE				

== Bengaluru North City Corporation (BNCC) ==
2026 Bengaluru North City Corporation elections
- By December 31, 2026

All 72 wards in Bengaluru North City Corporation 37 seats needed for a majority
- Registered: 19,54,272

	Majority party	Minority party	Third party
Party	BJP	INC	JD(S)
Alliance	NDA		NDA
BBMP majority before election
Council Abolished
Elected BNCC majority
TBE

=== 2026 Bengaluru North City Corporation elections ===
The 2026 Bengaluru North City Corporation elections are scheduled to be held by 31 December 2026 in all 72 Wards. It is one of the five newly established City Corporations under the apex body Greater Bengaluru Authority with seat of government in Yelahanka.

==== Schedule ====
Poll Event	Date
Date for Notification of Election	TBD
Last date for filing nominations	TBD
Date for scrutiny of nominations	TBD
Last date for withdrawal of candidatures	TBD
Date of poll	TBD
Date of Repoll wherever necessary	TBD
Date of counting	TBD
Date before which the election shall be completed	31 December 2026

==== Parties ====
The BJP and JD(S) are contesting as part of the NDA.

Party	Flag	Symbol	Photo	Leader	Seats contested
Indian National Congress					
National Democratic Alliance (NDA)
Bharatiya Janata Party					
Janata Dal (Secular)					

==== Candidates ====
The BJP and JD(S) are contesting jointly under the NDA, so a single NDA candidate will be fielded in each ward. Reservation: GEN = General, SC = Scheduled Caste, ST = Scheduled Tribe, BC-A and BC-B = Backward Class "A" and "B"; (W) = seat reserved for women.

Ward			National Democratic Alliance		Indian National Congress	
#	Name	Reservation	Party	Candidate	Party	Candidate
1	Raja Kempegowda Ward	BC-B			INC	
2	Aerocity	BC-B (W)			INC	
3	Chowdeshwari Ward	BC-A (W)			INC	
4	Nyayanga Badavane	SC			INC	
5	Yelahanka Satellite Town	GEN			INC	
6	Doddabettahalli	ST			INC	
7	Attur	BC-A (W)			INC	
8	Singapura	GEN (W)			INC	
9	Kuvempunagara	SC			INC	
10	Vidyaranyapura	GEN (W)			INC	
11	Doddabommasandra	GEN (W)			INC	
12	Thindlu	BC-B			INC	
13	Kodigehalli	GEN			INC	
14	Rajiv Gandhi Nagar	GEN			INC	
15	Byatarayanapura	BC-A			INC	
16	Amruthahalli	BC-A			INC	
17	Jakkur	GEN (W)			INC	
18	Kempapura	GEN (W)			INC	
19	Thanisandra	BC-A			INC	
20	Sampigehalli	GEN			INC	
21	Kogilu	BC-A (W)			INC	
22	Nagavara	GEN			INC	
23	Hennur	GEN			INC	
24	HBR Layout	BC-A			INC	
25	Govindapura	GEN			INC	
26	Samadhana Nagar	GEN (W)			INC	
27	K.G.Halli	GEN (W)			INC	
28	Venkateshpuram	GEN			INC	
29	Lingarajpura	BC-B			INC	
30	Kacharakanahalli	GEN (W)			INC	
31	Kalyan Nagar	GEN (W)			INC	
32	Banaswadi	BC-A			INC	
33	HRBR Layout	BC-B (W)			INC	
34	Subbayanapalya	GEN (W)			INC	
35	Kammanahalli	SC (W)			INC	
36	Maruthi Seva Nagara	GEN			INC	
37	Jeevanahalli	SC (W)			INC	
38	Shampura	GEN (W)			INC	
39	Kaval Byrasandra	GEN (W)			INC	
40	Shakthi Nagar	BC-A (W)			INC	
41	Periyar Nagar	BC-A (W)			INC	
42	Aruna Asif Ali Ward	SC (W)			INC	
43	Varalakshmi Nagar	GEN (W)			INC	
44	Doddanna Nagar	SC			INC	
45	Kushal Nagar	BC-A			INC	
46	Sagayapuram	SC			INC	
47	Pulakeshi Nagar	BC-A			INC	
48	S.K Garden	BC-A			INC	
49	Jaya Chamarajendra Nagara	GEN			INC	
50	Dinnur	GEN			INC	
51	Manorayanapalya	GEN (W)			INC	
52	Vishwanatha Nagenahalli	GEN			INC	
53	R.T Nagar	GEN			INC	
54	Gangenahalli	BC-A (W)			INC	
55	Ganganagar	BC-A (W)			INC	
56	Hebbal	SC			INC	
57	Bhoopasandra	GEN (W)			INC	
58	Nagashettyhalli	GEN			INC	
59	Geddalahalli	BC-A			INC	
60	Jalahalli	ST (W)			INC	
61	HMT Ward	GEN (W)			INC	
62	Brundavana Nagara	GEN			INC	
63	J.P Park	GEN			INC	
64	Yeshwanthpura	BC-A (W)			INC	
65	Abbigere	GEN			INC	
66	Kammagondanahalli	GEN			INC	
67	Shettihalli	SC (W)			INC	
68	Mallasandra	BC-A (W)			INC	
69	Bagalagunte	GEN			INC	
70	Manjunatha Nagar	GEN (W)			INC	
71	Nele Maheshwaramma Temple Ward	BC-A			INC	
72	Dasarahalli	GEN (W)			INC	

==== Opinion and exit polls ====
Opinion Polls
Polling agency				Lead
Polling agency	NDA	INC	Others	Lead
Actual result				

Exit Polls
Polling agency				Lead
Polling agency	NDA	INC	Others	Lead
Actual result				

==== Results ====
===== Results by parties =====
Party	Symbol	Seats won	Seats +/−	Vote %
Indian National Congress				
National Democratic Alliance (NDA)
Bharatiya Janata Party				
Janata Dal (Secular)				
Others				
Total		72	-	

===== Results by wards =====
Ward		Turnout	Winner				Runner-up				Margin
No.	Name	%	Candidate	Party	Votes	%	Candidate	Party	Votes	%	Margin
1	Raja Kempegowda Ward										
2	Aerocity										
3	Chowdeshwari Ward										
4	Nyayanga Badavane										
5	Yelahanka Satellite Town										
6	Doddabettahalli										
7	Attur										
8	Singapura										
9	Kuvempunagara										
10	Vidyaranyapura										
11	Doddabommasandra										
12	Thindlu										
13	Kodigehalli										
14	Rajiv Gandhi Nagar										
15	Byatarayanapura										
16	Amruthahalli										
17	Jakkur										
18	Kempapura										
19	Thanisandra										
20	Sampigehalli										
21	Kogilu										
22	Nagavara										
23	Hennur										
24	HBR Layout										
25	Govindapura										
26	Samadhana Nagar										
27	K.G.Halli										
28	Venkateshpuram										
29	Lingarajpura										
30	Kacharakanahalli										
31	Kalyan Nagar										
32	Banaswadi										
33	HRBR Layout										
34	Subbayanapalya										
35	Kammanahalli										
36	Maruthi Seva Nagara										
37	Jeevanahalli										
38	Shampura										
39	Kaval Byrasandra										
40	Shakthi Nagar										
41	Periyar Nagar										
42	Aruna Asif Ali Ward										
43	Varalakshmi Nagar										
44	Doddanna Nagar										
45	Kushal Nagar										
46	Sagayapuram										
47	Pulakeshi Nagar										
48	S.K Garden										
49	Jaya Chamarajendra Nagara										
50	Dinnur										
51	Manorayanapalya										
52	Vishwanatha Nagenahalli										
53	R.T Nagar										
54	Gangenahalli										
55	Ganganagar										
56	Hebbal										
57	Bhoopasandra										
58	Nagashettyhalli										
59	Geddalahalli										
60	Jalahalli										
61	HMT Ward										
62	Brundavana Nagara										
63	J.P Park										
64	Yeshwanthpura										
65	Abbigere										
66	Kammagondanahalli										
67	Shettihalli										
68	Mallasandra										
69	Bagalagunte										
70	Manjunatha Nagar										
71	Nele Maheshwaramma Temple Ward										
72	Dasarahalli										

=== 2026 Bengaluru North City Mayoral and Deputy-Mayoral elections ===
The 2026 Bengaluru North City Mayoral and Deputy-Mayoral elections are scheduled to be held in 2026 after the corporation elections the same year. The 72 Ward corporators will elect the Mayor and Deputy-Mayor of the corporation for a term period of 30 months, being the first half of the Corporation's 5-year term.

2026 Bengaluru North City Mayoral Election
Party	Candidate	Votes	%	±%
NDA	TBA			
INC	TBA			
Others	TBA			
Absentee				
Margin of victory				
Turnout				
Total valid votes				
Registered electors		72		
TBE gain from TBE				

2026 Bengaluru North City Deputy-Mayoral Election
Party	Candidate	Votes	%	±%
NDA	TBA			
INC	TBA			
Others	TBA			
Absentee				
Margin of victory				
Turnout				
Total valid votes				
Registered electors		72		
TBE gain from TBE				

=== 2029 Bengaluru North City Mayoral and Deputy-Mayoral elections ===
The 2029 Bengaluru North City Mayoral and Deputy-Mayoral elections are scheduled to be held in 2029, at the mid-term of the corporation. The 72 Ward corporators will elect the Mayor and Deputy-Mayor of the corporation for a term period of 30 months, being the second half of the Corporation's 5-year term.

2029 Bengaluru North City Mayoral Election
Party	Candidate	Votes	%	±%
NDA	TBA			
INC	TBA			
Others	TBA			
Absentee				
Margin of victory				
Turnout				
Total valid votes				
Registered electors		72		
TBE gain from TBE				

2029 Bengaluru North City Deputy-Mayoral Election
Party	Candidate	Votes	%	±%
NDA	TBA			
INC	TBA			
Others	TBA			
Absentee				
Margin of victory				
Turnout				
Total valid votes				
Registered electors		72		
TBE gain from TBE				

== Bengaluru South City Corporation (BSCC) ==
2026 Bengaluru South City Corporation elections
- By December 31, 2026

All 72 wards in Bengaluru South City Corporation 37 seats needed for a majority
- Registered: 17,44,611

	Majority party	Minority party	Third party
Party	BJP	INC	JD(S)
Alliance	NDA		NDA
BBMP majority before election
Council Abolished
Elected BSCC majority
TBE

=== 2026 Bengaluru South City Corporation elections ===
The 2026 Bengaluru South City Corporation elections are scheduled to be held by 31 December 2026 in all 72 Wards. It is one of the five newly established City Corporations under the apex body Greater Bengaluru Authority with seat of government in Jayanagar.

==== Schedule ====
Poll Event	Date
Date for Notification of Election	TBD
Last date for filing nominations	TBD
Date for scrutiny of nominations	TBD
Last date for withdrawal of candidatures	TBD
Date of poll	TBD
Date of Repoll wherever necessary	TBD
Date of counting	TBD
Date before which the election shall be completed	31 December 2026

==== Parties ====
The BJP and JD(S) are contesting as part of the NDA.

Party	Flag	Symbol	Photo	Leader	Seats contested
Indian National Congress					
National Democratic Alliance (NDA)
Bharatiya Janata Party					
Janata Dal (Secular)					

==== Candidates ====
The BJP and JD(S) are contesting jointly under the NDA, so a single NDA candidate will be fielded in each ward. Reservation: GEN = General, SC = Scheduled Caste, ST = Scheduled Tribe, BC-A and BC-B = Backward Class "A" and "B"; (W) = seat reserved for women.

Ward			National Democratic Alliance		Indian National Congress	
#	Name	Reservation	Party	Candidate	Party	Candidate
1	Padmanabhanagara	GEN (W)			INC	
2	Kadirenahalli	GEN			INC	
3	Yarab Nagar	GEN (W)			INC	
4	Banashankari Temple Ward	BC-A			INC	
5	Kane Muneshwara Ward	BC-A (W)			INC	
6	Gowdanapalya	GEN (W)			INC	
7	Byrasandra	BC-B (W)			INC	
8	Tilak Nagara	BC-A			INC	
9	N.A.L Layout	BC-A			INC	
10	Abdul Kalam Nagar	BC-A			INC	
11	Jayanagar East	BC-A			INC	
12	Pattabhirama Nagara	BC-B			INC	
13	Marenahalli South	SC (W)			INC	
14	J.P Nagar	BC-A (W)			INC	
15	Shakambarinagara	BC-B			INC	
16	Sarakki	GEN			INC	
17	N.S Palya	GEN			INC	
18	Viswamanava Kuvempu Ward	BC-A (W)			INC	
19	New Tavarekere	GEN			INC	
20	Madiwala	GEN			INC	
21	Chikka Adugodi	BC-A			INC	
22	S.G Palya	GEN			INC	
23	Lakkasandra	BC-A (W)			INC	
24	Adugodi	GEN (W)			INC	
25	National Games Village	SC (W)			INC	
26	Ejipura	SC			INC	
27	Sri Lakshmi Devi Ward	BC-B			INC	
28	Kormangala East	GEN			INC	
29	Kormangala West	ST			INC	
30	Jakkasandra	BC-A (W)			INC	
31	Kasavanahalli	GEN (W)			INC	
32	Kudlu	GEN			INC	
33	Naganathapura	GEN			INC	
34	Chikkathoguru	GEN			INC	
35	Vishwapriya Nagara	GEN			INC	
36	Beguru	GEN			INC	
37	Yelenahalli	GEN (W)			INC	
38	Doddakammanahalli	BC-A			INC	
39	Gottigere	BC-A			INC	
40	Anjanapura	GEN (W)			INC	
41	Kothanur	SC			INC	
42	RBI Layout	GEN (W)			INC	
43	Bheereshwara Nagar	BC-A (W)			INC	
44	Harinagar	BC-A			INC	
45	Konanakunte	BC-A (W)			INC	
46	Yelachenahalli	BC-A (W)			INC	
47	Chandranagara	GEN			INC	
48	Vasanthapura	GEN (W)			INC	
49	Uttarahalli	SC (W)			INC	
50	Sarvabhouma Nagar	GEN			INC	
51	Subramanyapura	GEN			INC	
52	Talagattapura	GEN (W)			INC	
53	Jaraganahalli	GEN			INC	
54	Kengal Hanumanthaiah South	GEN (W)			INC	
55	Puttenahalli	GEN (W)			INC	
56	Doresanipalya	GEN (W)			INC	
57	Hulimavu	GEN (W)			INC	
58	Arakere	GEN			INC	
59	Vijaya Bank Layout	GEN (W)			INC	
60	Bilekahalli	GEN			INC	
61	Kodi Chikkanahalli	SC			INC	
62	Devarachikkanahalli	BC-B (W)			INC	
63	Bommanahalli	BC-A (W)			INC	
64	Hongasandra	GEN (W)			INC	
65	Garvebavi Palya	GEN (W)			INC	
66	Singasandra	GEN (W)			INC	
67	Bandepalya	BC-A			INC	
68	Mangammana Palya	GEN			INC	
69	Hosapalya	GEN (W)			INC	
70	Iblur	SC			INC	
71	Agara	GEN (W)			INC	
72	HSR Layout	GEN			INC	

==== Opinion and exit polls ====
Opinion Polls
Polling agency				Lead
Polling agency	NDA	INC	Others	Lead
Actual result				

Exit Polls
Polling agency				Lead
Polling agency	NDA	INC	Others	Lead
Actual result				

==== Results ====
===== Results by parties =====
Party	Symbol	Seats won	Seats +/−	Vote %
Indian National Congress				
National Democratic Alliance (NDA)
Bharatiya Janata Party				
Janata Dal (Secular)				
Others				
Total		72	-	

===== Results by wards =====
Ward		Turnout	Winner				Runner-up				Margin
No.	Name	%	Candidate	Party	Votes	%	Candidate	Party	Votes	%	Margin
1	Padmanabhanagara										
2	Kadirenahalli										
3	Yarab Nagar										
4	Banashankari Temple Ward										
5	Kane Muneshwara Ward										
6	Gowdanapalya										
7	Byrasandra										
8	Tilak Nagara										
9	N.A.L Layout										
10	Abdul Kalam Nagar										
11	Jayanagar East										
12	Pattabhirama Nagara										
13	Marenahalli South										
14	J.P Nagar										
15	Shakambarinagara										
16	Sarakki										
17	N.S Palya										
18	Viswamanava Kuvempu Ward										
19	New Tavarekere										
20	Madiwala										
21	Chikka Adugodi										
22	S.G Palya										
23	Lakkasandra										
24	Adugodi										
25	National Games Village										
26	Ejipura										
27	Sri Lakshmi Devi Ward										
28	Kormangala East										
29	Kormangala West										
30	Jakkasandra										
31	Kasavanahalli										
32	Kudlu										
33	Naganathapura										
34	Chikkathoguru										
35	Vishwapriya Nagara										
36	Beguru										
37	Yelenahalli										
38	Doddakammanahalli										
39	Gottigere										
40	Anjanapura										
41	Kothanur										
42	RBI Layout										
43	Bheereshwara Nagar										
44	Harinagar										
45	Konanakunte										
46	Yelachenahalli										
47	Chandranagara										
48	Vasanthapura										
49	Uttarahalli										
50	Sarvabhouma Nagar										
51	Subramanyapura										
52	Talagattapura										
53	Jaraganahalli										
54	Kengal Hanumanthaiah South										
55	Puttenahalli										
56	Doresanipalya										
57	Hulimavu										
58	Arakere										
59	Vijaya Bank Layout										
60	Bilekahalli										
61	Kodi Chikkanahalli										
62	Devarachikkanahalli										
63	Bommanahalli										
64	Hongasandra										
65	Garvebavi Palya										
66	Singasandra										
67	Bandepalya										
68	Mangammana Palya										
69	Hosapalya										
70	Iblur										
71	Agara										
72	HSR Layout										

=== 2026 Bengaluru South City Mayoral and Deputy-Mayoral elections ===
The 2026 Bengaluru South City Mayoral and Deputy-Mayoral elections are scheduled to be held in 2026 after the corporation elections the same year. The 72 Ward corporators will elect the Mayor and Deputy-Mayor of the corporation for a term period of 30 months, being the first half of the Corporation's 5-year term.

2026 Bengaluru South City Mayoral Election
Party	Candidate	Votes	%	±%
NDA	TBA			
INC	TBA			
Others	TBA			
Absentee				
Margin of victory				
Turnout				
Total valid votes				
Registered electors		72		
TBE gain from TBE				

2026 Bengaluru South City Deputy-Mayoral Election
Party	Candidate	Votes	%	±%
NDA	TBA			
INC	TBA			
Others	TBA			
Absentee				
Margin of victory				
Turnout				
Total valid votes				
Registered electors		72		
TBE gain from TBE				

=== 2029 Bengaluru South City Mayoral and Deputy-Mayoral elections ===
The 2029 Bengaluru South City Mayoral and Deputy-Mayoral elections are scheduled to be held in 2029, at the mid-term of the corporation. The 72 Ward corporators will elect the Mayor and Deputy-Mayor of the corporation for a term period of 30 months, being the second half of the Corporation's 5-year term.

2029 Bengaluru South City Mayoral Election
Party	Candidate	Votes	%	±%
NDA	TBA			
INC	TBA			
Others	TBA			
Absentee				
Margin of victory				
Turnout				
Total valid votes				
Registered electors		72		
TBE gain from TBE				

2029 Bengaluru South City Deputy-Mayoral Election
Party	Candidate	Votes	%	±%
NDA	TBA			
INC	TBA			
Others	TBA			
Absentee				
Margin of victory				
Turnout				
Total valid votes				
Registered electors		72		
TBE gain from TBE				

== Bengaluru East City Corporation (BECC) ==
2026 Bengaluru East City Corporation elections
- By December 31, 2026

All 50 wards in Bengaluru East City Corporation 26 seats needed for a majority
- Registered: 10,41,396

	Majority party	Minority party	Third party
Party	BJP	INC	JD(S)
Alliance	NDA		NDA
BBMP majority before election
Council Abolished
Elected BECC majority
TBE

=== 2026 Bengaluru East City Corporation elections ===
The 2026 Bengaluru East City Corporation elections are scheduled to be held by 31 December 2026 in all 50 Wards. It is one of the five newly established City Corporations under the apex body Greater Bengaluru Authority with seat of government in Mahadevapura.

==== Schedule ====
Poll Event	Date
Date for Notification of Election	TBD
Last date for filing nominations	TBD
Date for scrutiny of nominations	TBD
Last date for withdrawal of candidatures	TBD
Date of poll	TBD
Date of Repoll wherever necessary	TBD
Date of counting	TBD
Date before which the election shall be completed	31 December 2026

==== Parties ====
The BJP and JD(S) are contesting as part of the NDA.

Party	Flag	Symbol	Photo	Leader	Seats contested
Indian National Congress					
National Democratic Alliance (NDA)
Bharatiya Janata Party					
Janata Dal (Secular)					

==== Candidates ====
The BJP and JD(S) are contesting jointly under the NDA, so a single NDA candidate will be fielded in each ward. Reservation: GEN = General, SC = Scheduled Caste, ST = Scheduled Tribe, BC-A and BC-B = Backward Class "A" and "B"; (W) = seat reserved for women.

Ward			National Democratic Alliance		Indian National Congress	
#	Name	Reservation	Party	Candidate	Party	Candidate
1	K Narayanapura	GEN (W)			INC	
2	Horamavu	BC-A			INC	
3	Chellakere	GEN			INC	
4	Babusab Palya	BC-B (W)			INC	
5	Hoysala Nagara East	GEN (W)			INC	
6	Kalkere	BC-A (W)			INC	
7	K Chennasandra	ST			INC	
8	Anandapura	GEN			INC	
9	Bhattarahalli	GEN			INC	
10	Basavanapura	BC-B			INC	
11	Krishnanagar	GEN			INC	
12	Devasandra	GEN			INC	
13	Rajarajeshwari Temple Ward	BC-A			INC	
14	K.R Pura	BC-A			INC	
15	Ramamurthy Nagara	SC (W)			INC	
16	Kotthur	BC-A (W)			INC	
17	Vijinapura	SC (W)			INC	
18	Dooravaninagar	GEN			INC	
19	K.S. Nissar Ahmed Ward	BC-A			INC	
20	A Narayanapura	SC (W)			INC	
21	Uday Nagar	GEN (W)			INC	
22	Mahadevapura	BC-A (W)			INC	
23	Sangama Ward	GEN (W)			INC	
24	Vignananagara	GEN			INC	
25	L.B Shastri Nagar	BC-A (W)			INC	
26	Jagadish Nagar	SC			INC	
27	Vibhootipura	GEN (W)			INC	
28	Byrathi	BC-A (W)			INC	
29	Hoodi	BC-A (W)			INC	
30	Belathur	SC			INC	
31	Kadugodi	GEN			INC	
32	Channasandra	GEN			INC	
33	S.M Krishna Ward	BC-A			INC	
34	Kaveri Nagara	SC			INC	
35	Garudachar Palya	BC-B			INC	
36	Bharath Aikya Ward	GEN (W)			INC	
37	Kundalahalli	GEN (W)			INC	
38	Whitefield	BC-A			INC	
39	Hagaduru	GEN (W)			INC	
40	Varthur	BC-A (W)			INC	
41	Munnenkolalu	GEN			INC	
42	Priyadarshini Ward	GEN			INC	
43	Dodda Nekkundi	GEN (W)			INC	
44	Ashwath Nagar	GEN (W)			INC	
45	Marathahalli	GEN			INC	
46	Yamalur	GEN (W)			INC	
47	Bellanduru	GEN			INC	
48	Panathur	SC			INC	
49	Shivanasamudra Ward	GEN (W)			INC	
50	Gunjur	BC-A			INC	

==== Opinion and exit polls ====
Opinion Polls
Polling agency				Lead
Polling agency	NDA	INC	Others	Lead
Actual result				

Exit Polls
Polling agency				Lead
Polling agency	NDA	INC	Others	Lead
Actual result				

==== Results ====
===== Results by parties =====
Party	Symbol	Seats won	Seats +/−	Vote %
Indian National Congress				
National Democratic Alliance (NDA)
Bharatiya Janata Party				
Janata Dal (Secular)				
Others				
Total		50	-	

===== Results by wards =====
Ward		Turnout	Winner				Runner-up				Margin
No.	Name	%	Candidate	Party	Votes	%	Candidate	Party	Votes	%	Margin
1	K Narayanapura										
2	Horamavu										
3	Chellakere										
4	Babusab Palya										
5	Hoysala Nagara East										
6	Kalkere										
7	K Chennasandra										
8	Anandapura										
9	Bhattarahalli										
10	Basavanapura										
11	Krishnanagar										
12	Devasandra										
13	Rajarajeshwari Temple Ward										
14	K.R Pura										
15	Ramamurthy Nagara										
16	Kotthur										
17	Vijinapura										
18	Dooravaninagar										
19	K.S. Nissar Ahmed Ward										
20	A Narayanapura										
21	Uday Nagar										
22	Mahadevapura										
23	Sangama Ward										
24	Vignananagara										
25	L.B Shastri Nagar										
26	Jagadish Nagar										
27	Vibhootipura										
28	Byrathi										
29	Hoodi										
30	Belathur										
31	Kadugodi										
32	Channasandra										
33	S.M Krishna Ward										
34	Kaveri Nagara										
35	Garudachar Palya										
36	Bharath Aikya Ward										
37	Kundalahalli										
38	Whitefield										
39	Hagaduru										
40	Varthur										
41	Munnenkolalu										
42	Priyadarshini Ward										
43	Dodda Nekkundi										
44	Ashwath Nagar										
45	Marathahalli										
46	Yamalur										
47	Bellanduru										
48	Panathur										
49	Shivanasamudra Ward										
50	Gunjur										

=== 2026 Bengaluru East City Mayoral and Deputy-Mayoral elections ===
The 2026 Bengaluru East City Mayoral and Deputy-Mayoral elections are scheduled to be held in 2026 after the corporation elections the same year. The 50 Ward corporators will elect the Mayor and Deputy-Mayor of the corporation for a term period of 30 months, being the first half of the Corporation's 5-year term.

2026 Bengaluru East City Mayoral Election
Party	Candidate	Votes	%	±%
NDA	TBA			
INC	TBA			
Others	TBA			
Absentee				
Margin of victory				
Turnout				
Total valid votes				
Registered electors		50		
TBE gain from TBE				

2026 Bengaluru East City Deputy-Mayoral Election
Party	Candidate	Votes	%	±%
NDA	TBA			
INC	TBA			
Others	TBA			
Absentee				
Margin of victory				
Turnout				
Total valid votes				
Registered electors		50		
TBE gain from TBE				

=== 2029 Bengaluru East City Mayoral and Deputy-Mayoral elections ===
The 2029 Bengaluru East City Mayoral and Deputy-Mayoral elections are scheduled to be held in 2029, at the mid-term of the corporation. The 50 Ward corporators will elect the Mayor and Deputy-Mayor of the corporation for a term period of 30 months, being the second half of the Corporation's 5-year term.

2029 Bengaluru East City Mayoral Election
Party	Candidate	Votes	%	±%
NDA	TBA			
INC	TBA			
Others	TBA			
Absentee				
Margin of victory				
Turnout				
Total valid votes				
Registered electors		50		
TBE gain from TBE				

2029 Bengaluru East City Deputy-Mayoral Election
Party	Candidate	Votes	%	±%
NDA	TBA			
INC	TBA			
Others	TBA			
Absentee				
Margin of victory				
Turnout				
Total valid votes				
Registered electors		50		
TBE gain from TBE				

== Bengaluru West City Corporation (BWCC) ==
2026 Bengaluru West City Corporation elections
- By December 31, 2026

All 112 wards in Bengaluru West City Corporation 57 seats needed for a majority
- Registered: 27,26,573

	Majority party	Minority party	Third party
Party	BJP	INC	JD(S)
Alliance	NDA		NDA
BBMP majority before election
Council Abolished
Elected BWCC majority
TBE

=== 2026 Bengaluru West City Corporation elections ===
The 2026 Bengaluru West City Corporation elections are scheduled to be held by 31 December 2026 in all 112 Wards. It is one of the five newly established City Corporations under the apex body Greater Bengaluru Authority with seat of government in Rajarajeshwari Nagar.

==== Schedule ====
Poll Event	Date
Date for Notification of Election	TBD
Last date for filing nominations	TBD
Date for scrutiny of nominations	TBD
Last date for withdrawal of candidatures	TBD
Date of poll	TBD
Date of Repoll wherever necessary	TBD
Date of counting	TBD
Date before which the election shall be completed	31 December 2026

==== Parties ====
The BJP and JD(S) are contesting as part of the NDA.

Party	Flag	Symbol	Photo	Leader	Seats contested
Indian National Congress					
National Democratic Alliance (NDA)
Bharatiya Janata Party					
Janata Dal (Secular)					

==== Candidates ====
The BJP and JD(S) are contesting jointly under the NDA, so a single NDA candidate will be fielded in each ward. Reservation: GEN = General, SC = Scheduled Caste, ST = Scheduled Tribe, BC-A and BC-B = Backward Class "A" and "B"; (W) = seat reserved for women.

Ward			National Democratic Alliance		Indian National Congress	
#	Name	Reservation	Party	Candidate	Party	Candidate
1	Nagasandra	GEN			INC	
2	Chokkasandra	GEN (W)			INC	
3	Nelagadaranahalli	GEN (W)			INC	
4	Parvathi Nagar	GEN			INC	
5	Rajeshwarinagar	GEN (W)			INC	
6	Shivapura	SC			INC	
7	Rajagopala Nagara	GEN			INC	
8	Hegganahalli	GEN (W)			INC	
9	Srigandhanagar	BC-A			INC	
10	Sunkadakatte	GEN (W)			INC	
11	Dodda Bidarakallu	GEN			INC	
12	Andrahalli	ST			INC	
13	Nada prabhu Kempegowda Nagara	GEN			INC	
14	Herohalli	BC-A (W)			INC	
15	Byadarahalli	BC-A			INC	
16	Ullal	GEN			INC	
17	Nagadevanahalli	GEN (W)			INC	
18	Kengal Hanumanthaiah West	GEN			INC	
19	Shivanapalya	BC-A (W)			INC	
20	Kengeri Kote Ward	BC-A			INC	
21	Kengeri	BC-A (W)			INC	
22	Bangarappa Nagara	GEN			INC	
23	Rajarajeshwari Nagara	BC-B (W)			INC	
24	Jnana Bharathi Ward	GEN			INC	
25	Vinayaka Layout	BC-A (W)			INC	
26	Mallathahalli	BC-A (W)			INC	
27	Srigandada Kaval	BC-A			INC	
28	Kottegepalya	GEN			INC	
29	Chowdeshwari Nagar	GEN			INC	
30	Kempegowda Layout	GEN			INC	
31	Freedom Fighter Ward	GEN			INC	
32	Laggere	GEN			INC	
33	Lakshmi Devi Nagar	SC			INC	
34	Peenya	SC (W)			INC	
35	Goraguntepalya	SC (W)			INC	
36	Nalwadi Krishnaraja Wadiyar Ward	SC			INC	
37	Dr. Puneeth Rajkumar Ward	GEN			INC	
38	Nandini Layout	BC-A			INC	
39	Jai Maruthi Nagar	GEN			INC	
40	Mahalakshmipuram	GEN			INC	
41	Nagapura	GEN (W)			INC	
42	Raja Mayura Varma Ward	GEN (W)			INC	
43	Kethamaranahalli	GEN (W)			INC	
44	Shankar Mutt	BC-A			INC	
45	Shakthi Ganapathi Nagara	BC-A (W)			INC	
46	Kamalanagara	GEN (W)			INC	
47	Vrishabhavathi Nagar	GEN (W)			INC	
48	Mathikere	BC-A			INC	
49	Aramane Nagara	GEN			INC	
50	Sadashiva Nagara	GEN (W)			INC	
51	Rajamahal	GEN			INC	
52	Kodandarampura	GEN (W)			INC	
53	Malleshwaram	GEN (W)			INC	
54	Subedarpalya	GEN (W)			INC	
55	Subramanyanagara	GEN			INC	
56	Gayathri Nagara	GEN (W)			INC	
57	Kuvempu Ward	BC-A			INC	
58	Dayanand Nagara	SC (W)			INC	
59	Bandi Reddy Circle Ward	SC			INC	
60	Prakash Nagara	GEN (W)			INC	
61	Da.Ra. Bendre Ward	BC-B			INC	
62	Rama Mandira	GEN (W)			INC	
63	Rajajinagara	GEN			INC	
64	Shivanagara	GEN			INC	
65	Manjunath Nagara	BC-A			INC	
66	Sane Guruvana Halli	BC-A			INC	
67	Basaveshwara Nagara	GEN (W)			INC	
68	Kamakshipalya	GEN			INC	
69	Agrahara Dasarahalli	BC-A (W)			INC	
70	Dr Rajkumar Ward	GEN			INC	
71	Thimmenahalli	BC-A			INC	
72	Kaveripura	GEN (W)			INC	
73	Dr. Vishnuvardhan Ward	BC-A (W)			INC	
74	Pattegar Palya	GEN (W)			INC	
75	Marenahalli West	BC-A (W)			INC	
76	Moodalapalya	BC-A (W)			INC	
77	Maruthi Mandira Ward	BC-B (W)			INC	
78	Anubhava Nagara	BC-A (W)			INC	
79	Nagarbhavi	GEN			INC	
80	Chandra Layout	BC-A			INC	
81	Nayanda Halli	SC			INC	
82	Attigupe	BC-A			INC	
83	Hampi Nagar	BC-B			INC	
84	Hosahalli	BC-A			INC	
85	Adi Chunchanagiri Ward	BC-B			INC	
86	Vidyaranyanagara	BC-A (W)			INC	
87	K.P Agrahara	BC-A (W)			INC	
88	Sangolli Rayanna Ward	ST (W)			INC	
89	Bapuji Nagara	BC-A			INC	
90	Krishnadevaraya ward	SC (W)			INC	
91	Gali Anjaneya Temple Ward	GEN (W)			INC	
92	Muneshwara Block	GEN (W)			INC	
93	Avalahalli	BC-A (W)			INC	
94	Deepanjali Nagara	GEN			INC	
95	Swamy Vivekananda Ward	GEN (W)			INC	
96	Kathriguppe	GEN (W)			INC	
97	Srinivasa Nagara	GEN (W)			INC	
98	Ashoka Nagara	GEN			INC	
99	T.R Shamanna Nagar	GEN (W)			INC	
100	Srinagar	BC-B (W)			INC	
101	Kempambudhi Ward	BC-B			INC	
102	Hanumanthanagar	GEN			INC	
103	N.R Colony	GEN (W)			INC	
104	Thyagarajnagar	GEN (W)			INC	
105	Yediyuru	GEN (W)			INC	
106	Devagiri Temple Ward	BC-A (W)			INC	
107	Dharmagiri Ward	GEN			INC	
108	Ganesh Mandira Ward	GEN (W)			INC	
109	Kamakya Layout	GEN			INC	
110	Chikkalasandra	GEN			INC	
111	Ittamadu	GEN (W)			INC	
112	Hosakerehalli	GEN			INC	

==== Opinion and exit polls ====
Opinion Polls
Polling agency				Lead
Polling agency	NDA	INC	Others	Lead
Actual result				

Exit Polls
Polling agency				Lead
Polling agency	NDA	INC	Others	Lead
Actual result				

==== Results ====
===== Results by parties =====
Party	Symbol	Seats won	Seats +/−	Vote %
Indian National Congress				
National Democratic Alliance (NDA)
Bharatiya Janata Party				
Janata Dal (Secular)				
Others				
Total		112	-	

===== Results by wards =====
Ward		Turnout	Winner				Runner-up				Margin
No.	Name	%	Candidate	Party	Votes	%	Candidate	Party	Votes	%	Margin
1	Nagasandra										
2	Chokkasandra										
3	Nelagadaranahalli										
4	Parvathi Nagar										
5	Rajeshwarinagar										
6	Shivapura										
7	Rajagopala Nagara										
8	Hegganahalli										
9	Srigandhanagar										
10	Sunkadakatte										
11	Dodda Bidarakallu										
12	Andrahalli										
13	Nada prabhu Kempegowda Nagara										
14	Herohalli										
15	Byadarahalli										
16	Ullal										
17	Nagadevanahalli										
18	Kengal Hanumanthaiah West										
19	Shivanapalya										
20	Kengeri Kote Ward										
21	Kengeri										
22	Bangarappa Nagara										
23	Rajarajeshwari Nagara										
24	Jnana Bharathi Ward										
25	Vinayaka Layout										
26	Mallathahalli										
27	Srigandada Kaval										
28	Kottegepalya										
29	Chowdeshwari Nagar										
30	Kempegowda Layout										
31	Freedom Fighter Ward										
32	Laggere										
33	Lakshmi Devi Nagar										
34	Peenya										
35	Goraguntepalya										
36	Nalwadi Krishnaraja Wadiyar Ward										
37	Dr. Puneeth Rajkumar Ward										
38	Nandini Layout										
39	Jai Maruthi Nagar										
40	Mahalakshmipuram										
41	Nagapura										
42	Raja Mayura Varma Ward										
43	Kethamaranahalli										
44	Shankar Mutt										
45	Shakthi Ganapathi Nagara										
46	Kamalanagara										
47	Vrishabhavathi Nagar										
48	Mathikere										
49	Aramane Nagara										
50	Sadashiva Nagara										
51	Rajamahal										
52	Kodandarampura										
53	Malleshwaram										
54	Subedarpalya										
55	Subramanyanagara										
56	Gayathri Nagara										
57	Kuvempu Ward										
58	Dayanand Nagara										
59	Bandi Reddy Circle Ward										
60	Prakash Nagara										
61	Da.Ra. Bendre Ward										
62	Rama Mandira										
63	Rajajinagara										
64	Shivanagara										
65	Manjunath Nagara										
66	Sane Guruvana Halli										
67	Basaveshwara Nagara										
68	Kamakshipalya										
69	Agrahara Dasarahalli										
70	Dr Rajkumar Ward										
71	Thimmenahalli										
72	Kaveripura										
73	Dr. Vishnuvardhan Ward										
74	Pattegar Palya										
75	Marenahalli West										
76	Moodalapalya										
77	Maruthi Mandira Ward										
78	Anubhava Nagara										
79	Nagarbhavi										
80	Chandra Layout										
81	Nayanda Halli										
82	Attigupe										
83	Hampi Nagar										
84	Hosahalli										
85	Adi Chunchanagiri Ward										
86	Vidyaranyanagara										
87	K.P Agrahara										
88	Sangolli Rayanna Ward										
89	Bapuji Nagara										
90	Krishnadevaraya ward										
91	Gali Anjaneya Temple Ward										
92	Muneshwara Block										
93	Avalahalli										
94	Deepanjali Nagara										
95	Swamy Vivekananda Ward										
96	Kathriguppe										
97	Srinivasa Nagara										
98	Ashoka Nagara										
99	T.R Shamanna Nagar										
100	Srinagar										
101	Kempambudhi Ward										
102	Hanumanthanagar										
103	N.R Colony										
104	Thyagarajnagar										
105	Yediyuru										
106	Devagiri Temple Ward										
107	Dharmagiri Ward										
108	Ganesh Mandira Ward										
109	Kamakya Layout										
110	Chikkalasandra										
111	Ittamadu										
112	Hosakerehalli										

=== 2026 Bengaluru West City Mayoral and Deputy-Mayoral elections ===
The 2026 Bengaluru West City Mayoral and Deputy-Mayoral elections are scheduled to be held in 2026 after the corporation elections the same year. The 112 Ward corporators will elect the Mayor and Deputy-Mayor of the corporation for a term period of 30 months, being the first half of the Corporation's 5-year term.

2026 Bengaluru West City Mayoral Election
Party	Candidate	Votes	%	±%
NDA	TBA			
INC	TBA			
Others	TBA			
Absentee				
Margin of victory				
Turnout				
Total valid votes				
Registered electors		112		
TBE gain from TBE				

2026 Bengaluru West City Deputy-Mayoral Election
Party	Candidate	Votes	%	±%
NDA	TBA			
INC	TBA			
Others	TBA			
Absentee				
Margin of victory				
Turnout				
Total valid votes				
Registered electors		112		
TBE gain from TBE				

=== 2029 Bengaluru West City Mayoral and Deputy-Mayoral elections ===
The 2029 Bengaluru West City Mayoral and Deputy-Mayoral elections are scheduled to be held in 2029, at the mid-term of the corporation. The 112 Ward corporators will elect the Mayor and Deputy-Mayor of the corporation for a term period of 30 months, being the second half of the Corporation's 5-year term.

2029 Bengaluru West City Mayoral Election
Party	Candidate	Votes	%	±%
NDA	TBA			
INC	TBA			
Others	TBA			
Absentee				
Margin of victory				
Turnout				
Total valid votes				
Registered electors		112		
TBE gain from TBE				

2029 Bengaluru West City Deputy-Mayoral Election
Party	Candidate	Votes	%	±%
NDA	TBA			
INC	TBA			
Others	TBA			
Absentee				
Margin of victory				
Turnout				
Total valid votes				
Registered electors		112		
TBE gain from TBE				

== Aftermath ==
=== 2026 Corporation Elections ===
The members of the Corporation are referred to as Corporators; they are directly elected by the registered voters of a ward for a 5-year term, with one corporator per ward.

City Corporation	Council Majority before elections	Council Majority after elections
Bengaluru Central City Corporation	Council Established (Vacant)	TBE
Bengaluru North City Corporation	Council Established (Vacant)	TBE
Bengaluru South City Corporation	Council Established (Vacant)	TBE
Bengaluru East City Corporation	Council Established (Vacant)	TBE
Bengaluru West City Corporation	Council Established (Vacant)	TBE

=== 2026 Mayoral and Deputy-Mayoral Elections ===
==== Mayoral ====
The Mayor is elected by and from among the directly elected corporators of each respective corporation. The term for the Mayor is fixed at 30 months, being the first half of the respective corporation's 5-year overall term.

City Corporation	Incumbent Mayor	Party	Elected Mayor	Party
Bengaluru Central City Corporation	Council Established (Vacant)	None	TBE	None
Bengaluru North City Corporation	Council Established (Vacant)	None	TBE	None
Bengaluru South City Corporation	Council Established (Vacant)	None	TBE	None
Bengaluru East City Corporation	Council Established (Vacant)	None	TBE	None
Bengaluru West City Corporation	Council Established (Vacant)	None	TBE	None

==== Deputy-Mayoral ====
The Deputy-Mayor is elected by and from among the directly elected corporators of each respective corporation. The term for each Deputy-Mayor is fixed at 30 months, being the first half of the respective corporation's 5-year overall term.

City Corporation	Incumbent Deputy-Mayor	Party	Elected Deputy-Mayor	Party
Bengaluru Central City Corporation	Council Established (Vacant)	None	TBE	None
Bengaluru North City Corporation	Council Established (Vacant)	None	TBE	None
Bengaluru South City Corporation	Council Established (Vacant)	None	TBE	None
Bengaluru East City Corporation	Council Established (Vacant)	None	TBE	None
Bengaluru West City Corporation	Council Established (Vacant)	None	TBE	None

=== 2029 Mayoral and Deputy-Mayoral Elections ===
==== Mayoral ====
The Mayor is elected by and from among the directly elected corporators of each respective corporation. The term for each Mayor is fixed at 30 months, being the second half of the respective corporation's 5-year overall term.

City Corporation	Incumbent Mayor	Party	Elected Mayor	Party
Bengaluru Central City Corporation	TBE	None	TBE	None
Bengaluru North City Corporation	TBE	None	TBE	None
Bengaluru South City Corporation	TBE	None	TBE	None
Bengaluru East City Corporation	TBE	None	TBE	None
Bengaluru West City Corporation	TBE	None	TBE	None

==== Deputy-Mayoral ====
The Deputy-Mayor is elected by and from among the directly elected corporators of each respective corporation. The term for each Deputy-Mayor is fixed at 30 months, being the second half of the respective corporation's 5-year overall term.

City Corporation	Incumbent Deputy-Mayor	Party	Elected Deputy-Mayor	Party
Bengaluru Central City Corporation	TBE	None	TBE	None
Bengaluru North City Corporation	TBE	None	TBE	None
Bengaluru South City Corporation	TBE	None	TBE	None
Bengaluru East City Corporation	TBE	None	TBE	None
Bengaluru West City Corporation	TBE	None	TBE	None

== See also ==
- Elections in Karnataka
- 2026 elections in India
- Bengaluru Central City Corporation
- Bengaluru North City Corporation
- Bengaluru South City Corporation
- Bengaluru East City Corporation
- Bengaluru West City Corporation
- Greater Bengaluru Authority
- Karnataka State Election Commission
- List of mayors of Bengaluru
- Administrative divisions of Bengaluru
- Bruhat Bengaluru Mahanagara Palike
- List of wards in Bangalore (2009–2023)
- List of wards in Bangalore (1995–2006)
