= Administrative divisions of Bengaluru =

The city of Bengaluru is administered under the Greater Bengaluru Authority (GBA), an apex urban governance body established under the Greater Bengaluru Governance Act, 2024 (GBG Act). The GBA supersedes the erstwhile Bruhat Bengaluru Mahanagara Palike (BBMP), which had governed Bengaluru as a single municipal corporation since 2007. Under the new framework, the city is divided into five City Corporations, which are in turn subdivided into 369 wards spread across 712 km^{2} (275 sq mi). The total electorate across the five corporations stands at 88,92,528 registered voters.

== Background ==
=== BBMP era (2007–2025) ===
The Bruhat Bengaluru Mahanagara Palike was constituted in 2007 by merging the erstwhile Bengaluru Mahanagara Palike with several surrounding municipal and town panchayat bodies. The BBMP governed Bengaluru through a single municipal council comprising 198 wards grouped into nine administrative zones. Following delimitation proposals under the Bommai Administration, the BBMP Act, 2020 provided for an expansion to 225 wards, though this restructuring was not implemented before BBMP's eventual abolition.

=== Transition to Greater Bengaluru Authority (2024–2025) ===
The Siddaramaiah Administration introduced and passed the Greater Bengaluru Governance Act, 2024, which came into force in 2025. The Act abolished the BBMP structure and replaced it with the Greater Bengaluru Authority, an apex statutory body presiding over five newly constituted City Corporations covering different geographic zones of Bengaluru. This represented the most significant restructuring of Bengaluru's municipal administration since BBMP's creation.

Following the dissolution of BBMP, the Karnataka government undertook a fresh delimitation exercise in 2025. The earlier 198 BBMP wards were expanded and reorganised into 368 wards distributed across the five corporations; subsequently one additional ward was added to the Bengaluru West City Corporation, bringing the total to 369 wards.

== Five City Corporations ==
Statistics of the five Bengaluru City Corporations
City Corporation	Headquarters	Abbreviation	Area	Wards	Polling Stations	Male Voters	Female Voters	Third Gender	Total Voters
Bengaluru Central City Corporation	Hudson Circle	BCCC	78 km^{2} (30 sq mi)	63	1,303	7,26,445	6,98,928	303	14,25,676
Bengaluru North City Corporation	Yelahanka	BNCC	158 km^{2} (61 sq mi)	72	1,706	9,94,319	9,59,572	381	19,54,272
Bengaluru South City Corporation	Jayanagar	BSCC	147 km^{2} (57 sq mi)	72	1,614	9,03,348	8,41,040	223	17,44,611
Bengaluru East City Corporation	Mahadevapura	BECC	168 km^{2} (65 sq mi)	50	919	5,49,170	4,91,968	258	10,41,396
Bengaluru West City Corporation	Rajarajeshwari Nagar	BWCC	161 km^{2} (62 sq mi)	112	2,482	13,96,470	13,29,635	468	27,26,573
Greater Bengaluru Authority (Total)	Hudson Circle	GBA	712 km^{2} (275 sq mi)	369	8,024	45,69,752	43,21,143	1,633	88,92,528

== Bengaluru Central City Corporation (BCCC) ==
The Bengaluru Central City Corporation (BCCC) covers the historic core of Bengaluru with its headquarters at Hudson Circle. It comprises 63 wards spread over 78 km^{2} (30 sq mi) with 14,25,676 registered voters.

Wards of Bengaluru Central City Corporation
Ward No.	Ward Name
1	Ramaswamy Palya
2	Jayamahal
3	Vasanth Nagar
4	Sampangirama Nagar
5	Shivajinagar
6	Bharathi Nagar
7	K Kamaraj Ward
8	Halasuru
9	Hoysala Nagara Central
10	Cox Town
11	Old Baiyappanahalli
12	Kasturi Nagar
13	Krishnaiahnapalya
14	Nagavarapalya
15	Indiranagar
16	New Thippasandra
17	Kaggadasapura
18	G.M Palya
19	Jeevan Bhimanagar
20	Kodihalli
21	Konena Agrahara
22	Domluru
23	Jogpalya
24	Agaram
25	Ashokanagar
26	Vannarpet
27	Ambedkarnagar
28	Neelasandra
29	Austin Town
30	Vinayakanagar
31	Shanthinagar
32	Silver Jubilee Park Ward
33	Dharmaraya Swamy Temple Ward
34	D.V Gundappa Ward
35	Hombegowda Nagara
36	Someshwara Nagara
37	BHEL Ward
38	Kanakanapalya
39	Venkat Reddy Nagara
40	Ashoka Pillar
41	V.V Puram
42	Sunkenahalli
43	Devaraj Urs Ward
44	Chamarajpet
45	K.R Market
46	Cheluvadi Palya
47	IPD Salappa Ward
48	Azad Nagar
49	Kasturbha Nagar
50	JJR Nagara
51	Old Guddadahalli
52	Padarayanapura
53	Rayapuram
54	Binnypete
55	Bhuvaneshwari Nagar
56	Gopalpura
57	Cottonpete
58	Chickpete
59	Nehru Nagar
60	Seshadripuram
61	Dattatreya Ward
62	Swatantra Palya Ward
63	Okalipuram

== Bengaluru North City Corporation (BNCC) ==
The Bengaluru North City Corporation (BNCC) covers the northern extent of Bengaluru with its headquarters at Yelahanka. It comprises 72 wards spread over 158 km^{2} (61 sq mi) with 19,54,272 registered voters.

Wards of Bengaluru North City Corporation
Ward No.	Ward Name
1	Raja Kempegowda Ward
2	Aerocity
3	Chowdeshwari Ward
4	Nyayanga Badavane
5	Yelahanka Satellite Town
6	Doddabettahalli
7	Attur
8	Singapura
9	Kuvempunagara
10	Vidyaranyapura
11	Doddabommasandra
12	Thindlu
13	Kodigehalli
14	Rajiv Gandhi Nagar
15	Byatarayanapura
16	Amruthahalli
17	Jakkur
18	Kempapura
19	Thanisandra
20	Sampigehalli
21	Kogilu
22	Nagavara
23	Hennur
24	HBR Layout
25	Govindapura
26	Samadhana Nagar
27	K.G.Halli
28	Venkateshpuram
29	Lingarajpura
30	Kacharakanahalli
31	Kalyan Nagar
32	Banaswadi
33	HRBR Layout
34	Subbayanapalya
35	Kammanahalli
36	Maruthi Seva Nagara
37	Jeevanahalli
38	Shampura
39	Kaval Byrasandra
40	Shakthi Nagar
41	Periyar Nagar
42	Aruna Asif Ali Ward
43	Varalakshmi Nagar
44	Doddanna Nagar
45	Kushal Nagar
46	Sagayapuram
47	Pulakeshi Nagar
48	S.K Garden
49	Jaya Chamarajendra Nagara
50	Dinnur
51	Manorayanapalya
52	Vishwanatha Nagenahalli
53	R.T Nagar
54	Gangenahalli
55	Ganganagar
56	Hebbal
57	Bhoopasandra
58	Nagashettyhalli
59	Geddalahalli
60	Jalahalli
61	HMT Ward
62	Brundavana Nagara
63	J.P Park
64	Yeshwanthpura
65	Abbigere
66	Kammagondanahalli
67	Shettihalli
68	Mallasandra
69	Bagalagunte
70	Manjunatha Nagar
71	Nele Maheshwaramma Temple Ward
72	Dasarahalli

== Bengaluru South City Corporation (BSCC) ==
The Bengaluru South City Corporation (BSCC) covers the southern residential and industrial belt of Bengaluru with its headquarters at Jayanagar. It comprises 72 wards spread over 147 km^{2} (57 sq mi) with 17,44,611 registered voters.

Wards of Bengaluru South City Corporation
Ward No.	Ward Name
1	Padmanabhanagara
2	Kadirenahalli
3	Yarab Nagar
4	Banashankari Temple Ward
5	Kane Muneshwara Ward
6	Gowdanapalya
7	Byrasandra
8	Tilak Nagara
9	N.A.L Layout
10	Abdul Kalam Nagar
11	Jayanagar East
12	Pattabhirama Nagara
13	Marenahalli South
14	J.P Nagar
15	Shakambarinagara
16	Sarakki
17	N.S Palya
18	Viswamanava Kuvempu Ward
19	New Tavarekere
20	Madiwala
21	Chikka Adugodi
22	S.G Palya
23	Lakkasandra
24	Adugodi
25	National Games Village
26	Ejipura
27	Sri Lakshmi Devi Ward
28	Kormangala East
29	Kormangala West
30	Jakkasandra
31	Kasavanahalli
32	Kudlu
33	Naganathapura
34	Chikkathoguru
35	Vishwapriya Nagara
36	Beguru
37	Yelenahalli
38	Doddakammanahalli
39	Gottigere
40	Anjanapura
41	Kothanur
42	RBI Layout
43	Bheereshwara Nagar
44	Harinagar
45	Konanakunte
46	Yelachenahalli
47	Chandranagara
48	Vasanthapura
49	Uttarahalli
50	Sarvabhouma Nagar
51	Subramanyapura
52	Talagattapura
53	Jaraganahalli
54	Kengal Hanumanthaiah South
55	Puttenahalli
56	Doresanipalya
57	Hulimavu
58	Arakere
59	Vijaya Bank Layout
60	Bilekahalli
61	Kodi Chikkanahalli
62	Devarachikkanahalli
63	Bommanahalli
64	Hongasandra
65	Garvebavi Palya
66	Singasandra
67	Bandepalya
68	Mangammana Palya
69	Hosapalya
70	Iblur
71	Agara
72	HSR Layout

== Bengaluru East City Corporation (BECC) ==
The Bengaluru East City Corporation (BECC) covers the tech-corridor eastern zone of Bengaluru with its headquarters at Mahadevapura. It comprises 50 wards spread over 168 km^{2} (65 sq mi) with 10,41,396 registered voters.

Wards of Bengaluru East City Corporation
Ward No.	Ward Name
1	K Narayanapura
2	Horamavu
3	Chellakere
4	Babusab Palya
5	Hoysala Nagara East
6	Kalkere
7	K Chennasandra
8	Anandapura
9	Bhattarahalli
10	Basavanapura
11	Krishnanagar
12	Devasandra
13	Rajarajeshwari Temple Ward
14	K.R Pura
15	Ramamurthy Nagara
16	Kotthur
17	Vijinapura
18	Dooravaninagar
19	K.S. Nissar Ahmed Ward
20	A Narayanapura
21	Uday Nagar
22	Mahadevapura
23	Sangama Ward
24	Vignananagara
25	L.B Shastri Nagar
26	Jagadish Nagar
27	Vibhootipura
28	Byrathi
29	Hoodi
30	Belathur
31	Kadugodi
32	Channasandra
33	S.M Krishna Ward
34	Kaveri Nagara
35	Garudachar Palya
36	Bharath Aikya Ward
37	Kundalahalli
38	Whitefield
39	Hagaduru
40	Varthur
41	Munnenkolalu
42	Priyadarshini Ward
43	Dodda Nekkundi
44	Ashwath Nagar
45	Marathahalli
46	Yamalur
47	Bellanduru
48	Panathur
49	Shivanasamudra Ward
50	Gunjur

== Bengaluru West City Corporation (BWCC) ==
The Bengaluru West City Corporation (BWCC) is the largest of the five corporations by ward count, covering western and south-western Bengaluru with its headquarters at Rajarajeshwari Nagar. It comprises 112 wards spread over 161 km^{2} (62 sq mi) with 27,26,573 registered voters — the highest voter base among the five corporations.

Wards of Bengaluru West City Corporation
Ward No.	Ward Name
1	Nagasandra
2	Chokkasandra
3	Nelagadaranahalli
4	Parvathi Nagar
5	Rajeshwarinagar
6	Shivapura
7	Rajagopala Nagara
8	Hegganahalli
9	Srigandhanagar
10	Sunkadakatte
11	Dodda Bidarakallu
12	Andrahalli
13	Nada Prabhu Kempegowda Nagara
14	Herohalli
15	Byadarahalli
16	Ullal
17	Nagadevanahalli
18	Kengal Hanumanthaiah West
19	Shivanapalya
20	Kengeri Kote Ward
21	Kengeri
22	Bangarappa Nagara
23	Rajarajeshwari Nagara
24	Jnana Bharathi Ward
25	Vinayaka Layout
26	Mallathahalli
27	Srigandada Kaval
28	Kottegepalya
29	Chowdeshwari Nagar
30	Kempegowda Layout
31	Freedom Fighter Ward
32	Laggere
33	Lakshmi Devi Nagar
34	Peenya
35	Goraguntepalya
36	Nalwadi Krishnaraja Wadiyar Ward
37	Dr. Puneeth Rajkumar Ward
38	Nandini Layout
39	Jai Maruthi Nagar
40	Mahalakshmipuram
41	Nagapura
42	Raja Mayura Varma Ward
43	Kethamaranahalli
44	Shankar Mutt
45	Shakthi Ganapathi Nagara
46	Kamalanagara
47	Vrishabhavathi Nagar
48	Mathikere
49	Aramane Nagara
50	Sadashiva Nagara
51	Rajamahal
52	Kodandarampura
53	Malleshwaram
54	Subedarpalya
55	Subramanyanagara
56	Gayathri Nagara
57	Kuvempu Ward
58	Dayanand Nagara
59	Bandi Reddy Circle Ward
60	Prakash Nagara
61	Da.Ra. Bendre Ward
62	Rama Mandira
63	Rajajinagara
64	Shivanagara
65	Manjunath Nagara
66	Sane Guruvana Halli
67	Basaveshwara Nagara
68	Kamakshipalya
69	Agrahara Dasarahalli
70	Dr Rajkumar Ward
71	Thimmenahalli
72	Kaveripura
73	Dr. Vishnuvardhan Ward
74	Pattegar Palya
75	Marenahalli West
76	Moodalapalya
77	Maruthi Mandira Ward
78	Anubhava Nagara
79	Nagarbhavi
80	Chandra Layout
81	Nayanda Halli
82	Attigupe
83	Hampi Nagar
84	Hosahalli
85	Adi Chunchanagiri Ward
86	Vidyaranyanagara
87	K.P Agrahara
88	Sangolli Rayanna Ward
89	Bapuji Nagara
90	Krishnadevaraya ward
91	Gali Anjaneya Temple Ward
92	Muneshwara Block
93	Avalahalli
94	Deepanjali Nagara
95	Swamy Vivekananda Ward
96	Kathriguppe
97	Srinivasa Nagara
98	Ashoka Nagara
99	T.R Shamanna Nagar
100	Srinagar
101	Kempambudhi Ward
102	Hanumanthanagar
103	N.R Colony
104	Thyagarajnagar
105	Yediyuru
106	Devagiri Temple Ward
107	Dharmagiri Ward
108	Ganesh Mandira Ward
109	Kamakya Layout
110	Chikkalasandra
111	Ittamadu
112	Hosakerehalli

== See also ==
- Greater Bengaluru Authority
- Bengaluru Central City Corporation
- Bengaluru North City Corporation
- Bengaluru South City Corporation
- Bengaluru East City Corporation
- Bengaluru West City Corporation
- 2026 Greater Bengaluru Authority elections
- Elections in Karnataka
