= Bengaluru North City Corporation =

Local government of northern Bengaluru

Bengaluru North City Corporation Beṅgaḷūru Uttara Nagara Pālike
- Emblem of Bengaluru North City Corporation

Type
- Type: Municipal Corporation

History
- Founded: 2 September 2025 (11 months ago)
- Preceded by: Bruhat Bengaluru Mahanagara Palike

Leadership
- Administrator / GBA Chief Commissioner (In absence of Mayor): Maheshwar Rao M., IAS
- Municipal Commissioner: Pommalai Sunil Kumar, IAS
- Mayor: Vacant, since 2 September 2025
- Deputy Mayor: Vacant, since 2 September 2025
- Leader of the Opposition: Vacant, since 2 September 2025
- Seats: 72

Elections
- Voting system: First-past-the-post
- Last election: New body
- Next election: 2026

Motto
- Kannada is our breath; Kannada is indeed, evergreen

Meeting place
- Yelahanka Zonal Office, Yelahanka, Bengaluru, Karnataka

Website
- Bengaluru North City Corporation

Footnotes
- Governed by: Greater Bengaluru Governance Act, 2024 (Karnataka Act No. 36 of 2025)

The Bengaluru North City Corporation (BNCC) is one of the five municipal corporations constituted under the Greater Bengaluru Authority (GBA) to govern the city of Bengaluru, Karnataka, India. It covers the northern zone of Bengaluru, with its administrative headquarters at Yelahanka. The BNCC was formally constituted on 2 September 2025 by a notification of the Government of Karnataka under the Greater Bengaluru Governance Act, 2024, published in the Karnataka Gazette Extra Ordinary No. 522 (English) and No. 523 (Kannada) of that date, superseding the Bruhat Bengaluru Mahanagara Palike (BBMP).

The BNCC covers 158 km^{2} (61 sq mi) across 72 wards, making it the second-largest of the five corporations by area. It encompasses the northern residential and satellite-town belt of Bengaluru, including Yelahanka, Hebbal, Byatarayanapura, HBR Layout, and Banaswadi. It has 19,54,272 registered voters across 1,706 polling stations.

== Background ==
=== Greater Bengaluru Governance Act, 2024 ===
The Greater Bengaluru Governance Act, 2024 (Karnataka Act No. 36 of 2025) was enacted by the Karnataka Legislative Assembly and received the assent of the Governor of Karnataka on 23 April 2025, first published in the Karnataka Gazette Extra Ordinary on the 24th day of April, 2025. The Act dissolved the BBMP and replaced it with the Greater Bengaluru Authority as an apex coordinating body, under which five City Corporations were constituted to independently govern distinct geographic zones of Bengaluru.

=== Preliminary notification and public consultation ===
On 19 July 2025, the Government of Karnataka published Gazette Extra Ordinary No. 403 under notification No.UDD 170 BBS 2025(e), which proposed the constitution of five City Corporations with specified boundaries and invited objections and suggestions from all affected persons within thirty days. Following consideration of objections and suggestions by the State Government, the final notification constituting the corporations was issued on 2 September 2025 and signed by Nandakumar B., Under Secretary to Government, Urban Development Department (BBMP-2 and Coordination).

=== Ward delimitation ===
The Karnataka government conducted a fresh ward delimitation exercise in 2025, replacing the earlier BBMP structure. The BNCC was assigned 72 wards across a 158 km^{2} (61 sq mi) area.

== Boundaries ==
Wards of the Bengaluru North City Corporation within the Greater Bengaluru Authority area

The boundaries of the BNCC were defined in Schedule-I of Gazette Extra Ordinary No. 522 (2 September 2025). The corporation is bounded on the south by the Bengaluru Central City Corporation and the Bengaluru West City Corporation, on the east by the Bengaluru East City Corporation, and on the remaining sides by areas beyond the GBA jurisdiction (BDA areas).

=== South boundary (with Bengaluru Central City Corporation) ===
The southern boundary with the Central City Corporation commences near the Baiyappanahalli Metro Station on the Outer Ring Road and runs south-west along the 5th Main Road, then west along Chikka Banasvadi Road and Banasawadi Main Road, continuing south-east to Bayappanahalli Main Road. The boundary then follows a series of local roads including PSK Naidu Road, the railway track, Wheeler Road, Assaye Road, St Johns Church Road and Haines Road, before turning north-east via Basaveshwara Main Road, the railway track, Benson Road and Binny Link Road. It then runs north along the 5th Main Road, north-west for approximately 1,150 metres, and ends at the BBMP Office on Maistry Marappa Street near PG Road.

=== South-west boundary (with Bengaluru West City Corporation) ===
The south-west boundary begins on Jayamahal Road and runs north-west, continuing north along Sri Ramanamharshi Road (NH7), then north-west along D Rajgopal Road and west along MSR Hospital Road. It continues north along 7th Cross Road, west along 80 Feet Road, and north-west along New BEL Road. The boundary then follows the railway track south-west, runs south along Sir MS Ramaiah Road, south-west along B Narayanaswamappa Road, and west along Rehman Khan Road. It continues south-west for approximately 90 metres, then north-west along the railway track and south-west along the Outer Ring Road (NH75), ending in the direction of Tumkur Road (NH75).

=== East boundary (with Bengaluru East City Corporation) ===
The eastern boundary runs along Bagalur Main Road southward, continuing via Hennur Bagalur Road, Horamavu Agara Main Road, and Hennur Main Road, ending at the Outer Ring Road (NH44).

=== North and north-west boundary (with BDA areas) ===
The northern and north-western boundary follows Tumkur Road (NH75), proceeds via Anchepalya Road, crosses Sidedahalli Main Road, continues through Hesarghatta area, and traces a complex path through Attur Lake and Enrich Nandnavana Layout before ending at Eternity Apartments.

== Governance structure ==
=== Corporation Council ===
The BNCC is governed by a corporation of 72 directly elected members (Corporators), one from each ward, elected through the first-past-the-post system. The term of the corporation council is five years from the date of its first meeting, unless dissolved earlier. Seats are reserved for persons belonging to the Scheduled Castes, Scheduled Tribes, Other Backward Classes and women, as prescribed by the state government. Not more than fifty percent of total seats shall be reserved across all categories, and not more than fifty percent of seats reserved for each category shall be reserved for women.

=== Mayor and Deputy Mayor ===
The Corporators elect one of their members as Mayor and another as Deputy Mayor at the first meeting of the newly constituted corporation. Both offices carry a term of 30 months (co-terminus with the first half of the five-year corporation council term), with fresh elections held at the mid-term for the remaining 30 months. A no-confidence motion against either officeholder may be moved only after six months from the commencement of their term; once defeated, another cannot be moved for the next six months.

The offices are subject to reservation by rotation for Scheduled Castes, Scheduled Tribes, Other Backward Classes and women, as prescribed by the state government.

As of May 2026, both offices are vacant pending the 2026 corporation elections.

=== Commissioner ===
The commissioner is appointed by the state government and serves as the chief executive officer of the Corporation. The commissioner must be an officer not below the rank of Secretary to the Government and holds office for a term of two years, subject to the pleasure of the Government. The commissioner supervises Joint Commissioners and other subordinate officers, implements resolutions of the City Corporation and the Standing Committees, and conducts all official correspondence between the Corporation and the Government or other authorities.

In the absence of an elected corporation council, the Corporation is administered by the Greater Bengaluru Authority Chief Commissioner acting jointly with the BNCC Commissioner.

=== Joint Commissioners (Zonal) ===
For administrative decentralisation, the BNCC is divided into zones, each headed by a Joint Commissioner appointed by the state government at a rank not below Deputy Secretary to Government or Karnataka Administrative Service (senior scale). The Joint Commissioner of each zone serves as the nodal authority for civic administration within that zone and coordinates Ward Committees and delegated functions.

=== Standing Committees ===
The Act establishes seven Standing Committees for the BNCC, each consisting of a minimum of nine and a maximum of fifteen Corporators (including a chairman elected by committee members). Each Standing Committee has a term of 30 months. The Mayor and Deputy Mayor are ex-officio members of all Standing Committees:

1. Standing Committee for Administration, Education and Social Justice
2. Standing Committee for Revenue and Finance
3. Standing Committee for Public Works and Engineering
4. Standing Committee for Public Health and Disaster Management
5. Standing Committee for Forest, Environment, Ecology, Lakes, Horticulture and Fisheries
6. Standing Committee for Infrastructure
7. Standing Committee for Audit and Accounts

=== Assembly Constituency Level Consultative and Co-ordination Committee ===
For each Vidhan Sabha constituency falling within the BNCC, the state government constitutes an Assembly Constituency Level Consultative and Co-ordination Committee chaired by the Member of the Legislative Assembly for that constituency, with the Corporators of that area as members. This body meets at least once a month to coordinate with government agencies, monitor project implementation and address public grievances.

=== Ward Committees ===
Each of the 72 wards has a Ward Committee. The Corporator representing the ward serves as chairperson. The committee consists of 15 members in total — the Chairperson plus 14 others, comprising at least two members from Scheduled Castes or Scheduled Tribes, at least three women, at least two members representing registered Residents' Welfare Associations (active for not less than three years and registered within the ward), and seven members nominated by the Corporation from among the ward's registered voters. The remaining seven members (excluding the seven Corporation nominees) are selected by random draw of lots from eligible applicants. The term of each Ward Committee is 20 months.

=== Ward Sabha ===
Each ward has a Ward Sabha consisting of all persons registered as voters in that ward. The Ward Sabha provides inputs for the formulation of the Annual Ward Development Plan, reviews project implementation, and participates in general ward-level meetings convened by the Ward Committee. The Ward Committee is required to hold the Ward Sabha at least once in every quarter.

== Elections ==
=== 2026 elections ===
The 2026 Greater Bengaluru Authority elections are the first elections to be held for all five corporations since the dissolution of the BBMP. The Supreme Court of India directed that polls be completed by 31 August 2026; the Karnataka government's request for an extension to September 2026 was rejected. All 72 wards of the BNCC are scheduled to go to the polls simultaneously. This will be the first direct election of Corporators to the BNCC; the corporation is a new entity with no prior electoral history.

=== Previous: 2015 BBMP election ===
The predecessor election was the 2015 Bruhat Bengaluru Mahanagara Palike election, held on 22 August 2015 for the undivided 198-ward BBMP. The more than eleven-year gap between that election and the 2026 GBA polls represents an unprecedented discontinuity in Bengaluru's municipal electoral history.

== Wards ==
The BNCC comprises 72 wards across a 158 km^{2} (61 sq mi) area spanning the northern zone of Bengaluru. The ward boundaries are as notified by the Karnataka Government in November 2025.

Wards of the Bengaluru North City Corporation
Ward No.	Ward Name	Ward No.	Ward Name
1	Raja Kempegowda Ward	37	Jeevanahalli
2	Aerocity	38	Shampura
3	Chowdeshwari Ward	39	Kaval Byrasandra
4	Nyayanga Badavane	40	Shakthi Nagar
5	Yelahanka Satellite Town	41	Periyar Nagar
6	Doddabettahalli	42	Aruna Asif Ali Ward
7	Attur	43	Varalakshmi Nagar
8	Singapura	44	Doddanna Nagar
9	Kuvempunagara	45	Kushal Nagar
10	Vidyaranyapura	46	Sagayapuram
11	Doddabommasandra	47	Pulakeshi Nagar
12	Thindlu	48	S.K Garden
13	Kodigehalli	49	Jaya Chamarajendra Nagara
14	Rajiv Gandhi Nagar	50	Dinnur
15	Byatarayanapura	51	Manorayanapalya
16	Amruthahalli	52	Vishwanatha Nagenahalli
17	Jakkur	53	R.T Nagar
18	Kempapura	54	Gangenahalli
19	Thanisandra	55	Ganganagar
20	Sampigehalli	56	Hebbal
21	Kogilu	57	Bhoopasandra
22	Nagavara	58	Nagashettyhalli
23	Hennur	59	Geddalahalli
24	HBR Layout	60	Jalahalli
25	Govindapura	61	HMT Ward
26	Samadhana Nagar	62	Brundavana Nagara
27	K.G.Halli	63	J.P Park
28	Venkateshpuram	64	Yeshwanthpura
29	Lingarajpura	65	Abbigere
30	Kacharakanahalli	66	Kammagondanahalli
31	Kalyan Nagar	67	Shettihalli
32	Banaswadi	68	Mallasandra
33	HRBR Layout	69	Bagalagunte
34	Subbayanapalya	70	Manjunatha Nagar
35	Kammanahalli	71	Nele Maheshwaramma Temple Ward
36	Maruthi Seva Nagara	72	Dasarahalli

== Functions and responsibilities ==
The BNCC's responsibilities under the Greater Bengaluru Governance Act, 2024 include obligatory functions such as property taxation, building regulation and zoning enforcement, public health and sanitation, solid waste management, maintenance of roads and stormwater drains, street lighting, parks and public spaces, urban forestry, and administration of markets and slaughterhouses. The BNCC also coordinates with the Bengaluru Water Supply and Sewerage Board on water supply and sewerage, and with the Bangalore Development Authority and other statutory bodies on land use and development matters.

The City Corporation Fund receives revenues from property tax, professional tax, advertisement charges, service fees, and state and central government grants. In cases where the BNCC cannot generate sufficient revenue for its obligatory functions, the state government provides grants-in-aid on the basis of recommendations from the Karnataka State Finance Commission.

== See also ==
- Greater Bengaluru Authority
- Bruhat Bengaluru Mahanagara Palike
- 2026 Greater Bengaluru Authority elections
- Bengaluru Central City Corporation
- Bengaluru South City Corporation
- Bengaluru East City Corporation
- Bengaluru West City Corporation
- Administrative divisions of Bengaluru
- List of mayors of Bengaluru
