= Bengaluru Central City Corporation =

Local government of central Bengaluru

Bengaluru Central City Corporation Beṅgaḷūru Kēndra Nagara Pālike

Type
- Type: Municipal Corporation

History
- Founded: 2 September 2025 (14 months ago)
- Preceded by: Bruhat Bengaluru Mahanagara Palike

Leadership
- Administrator / GBA Chief Commissioner (In absence of Mayor): Maheshwar Rao M., IAS
- Municipal Commissioner: Rajendra Cholan P., IAS
- Mayor: Vacant, since 2 September 2025
- Deputy Mayor: Vacant, since 2 September 2025
- Leader of the Opposition: Vacant, since 2 September 2025
- Seats: 63

Elections
- Voting system: First-past-the-post
- Last election: New body
- Next election: 2026

Motto
- Kannada is our breath; Kannada is indeed, evergreen

Meeting place
- Kempegowda Civic Hall, Annex 3, Kalinga Rao Road, Sampangirama Nagara, Bengaluru, Karnataka – 560 002

Website
- Bengaluru Central City Corporation

Footnotes
- Governed by: Greater Bengaluru Governance Act, 2024 (Karnataka Act No. 36 of 2025)

The Bengaluru Central City Corporation (BCCC) is one of the five municipal corporations constituted under the Greater Bengaluru Authority (GBA) to govern the city of Bengaluru, Karnataka, India. It covers the historic urban core of Bengaluru, with its administrative headquarters at Hudson Circle (Kempegowda Civic Hall, Kalinga Rao Road). The BCCC was formally constituted on 2 September 2025 by a notification of the Government of Karnataka under the Greater Bengaluru Governance Act, 2024, published in the Karnataka Gazette Extra Ordinary No. 522 (English) and No. 523 (Kannada) of that date, superseding the Bruhat Bengaluru Mahanagara Palike (BBMP).

The BCCC is the smallest of the five corporations by area (78 km^{2} (30 sq mi)) and by ward count (63 wards), but encompasses some of the city's most densely populated and historically significant localities, including Malleshwaram, Rajajinagar, Shivajinagar, Indiranagar, Chamarajpet and Chickpete. It has 14,25,676 registered voters across 1,303 polling stations.

== Background ==
=== Greater Bengaluru Governance Act, 2024 ===
The Greater Bengaluru Governance Act, 2024 (Karnataka Act No. 36 of 2025) was enacted by the Karnataka Legislative Assembly and received the assent of the Governor of Karnataka on 23 April 2025, first published in the Karnataka Gazette Extra Ordinary on 24 April 2025. The act dissolved the BBMP and replaced it with the Greater Bengaluru Authority as an apex coordinating body, under which five City Corporations were constituted to independently govern distinct geographic zones of Bengaluru.

=== Preliminary notification and public consultation ===
On 19 July 2025, the Government of Karnataka published Gazette Extra Ordinary No. 403 under notification No.UDD 170 BBS 2025(e), which proposed the constitution of five City Corporations with specified boundaries and invited objections and suggestions from all affected persons within thirty days. Following consideration of objections and suggestions by the State Government, the final notification constituting the corporations was issued on 2 September 2025 and signed by Nandakumar B., Under Secretary to Government, Urban Development Department (BBMP-2 and Coordination).

=== Ward delimitation ===
The Karnataka government conducted a fresh ward delimitation exercise in 2025, replacing the earlier BBMP structure. The BCCC was assigned 63 wards across a 78 km^{2} (30 sq mi) area.

== Boundaries ==
Wards of the Bengaluru Central City Corporation within the Greater Bengaluru Authority area

The boundaries of the BCCC were defined in Schedule-I of Gazette Extra Ordinary No. 522 (2 September 2025). The corporation is bounded on the north by the Bengaluru North City Corporation, on the west and south-west by the Bengaluru West City Corporation, on the south by the Bengaluru South City Corporation, and on the east by the Bengaluru East City Corporation.

=== North boundary (with Bengaluru North City Corporation) ===
The northern boundary commences near the Baiyappanahalli Metro Station on the Outer Ring Road and runs south-west along the 5th Main Road, then west along Chikka Banasvadi Road and Banasawadi Main Road, continuing south-east to Bayappanahalli Main Road. The boundary then follows a series of local roads including PSK Naidu Road, the railway track, Wheeler Road, Assaye Road, St Johns Church Road and Haines Road, before turning north-east via Basaveshwara Main Road, the railway track, Benson Road and Binny Link Road. It then runs north along the 5th Main Road, north-west for approximately 1,150 metres, and ends at the BBMP Office on Maistry Marappa Street near PG Road.

=== West boundary (with Bengaluru West City Corporation) ===
The western boundary begins at KC Palace Club and runs south-east along Jayamahal Main Road, then west along the railway track, north-west along Palace Road, and south-west along Sheshadripuram Main Road. It continues west along the 6th Cross Road and 3rd Cross Road, north along Nagappa Street, and west along the 2nd Main Road before following the Vrishabhavathi River westward. The boundary traverses the 10th and 11th Cross Roads, then runs south along Sampige Road and west along MKK Road. After running south-east along the railway track, south along the 5th Main Road and south along the 9th Main Road, it turns west along 120 metres, then south along the 1st Main Road and west along 3rd Cross Bramhapura Road. It then follows a nala south to the Vrishabhavathi River, before running east along Magadi Main Road, south along the 8th Cross Road, and continuing via Kaveri Nadi Road, Sameer Pura Main Road, Laxmipura Main Road, Kumaraswamy Temple Road, Mount Joy Road, Bugle Rock Road and Krishna Rajendra Road, ending at United Hospital / Best Surgical Hospital & Family Care Clinic near the 15th Main Road.

=== South boundary (with Bengaluru South City Corporation) ===
The southern boundary starts at Madhavan Park and runs south-east along Mountain Road. It then traverses a series of cross roads and the Bannerghatta Main Road, Hosur Main Road, Lalbagh Main Road, 80 Feet Road, Ejipura Main Road and Sarjapur Road, ending at Euphoria Cricket Ground near Koramangala.

=== East boundary (with Bengaluru East City Corporation) ===
The eastern boundary starts at Euphoria Cricket Ground and runs north-west, crossing Choco Club, then north-west via the Embassy Golf Link Road area. It continues north-east past the HAL old airport road area (Dr Rajkumar Road, Suranjan Das Road), then north and north-east along GM Palya Main Road, Kaggadasapura Main Road and Old Madras Road, ending at B Channasandra Graveyard.

== Governance structure ==
=== Corporation Council ===
The BCCC is governed by a corporation of 63 directly elected members (Corporators), one from each ward, elected through the first-past-the-post system. The term of the corporation council is five years from the date of its first meeting, unless dissolved earlier. Seats are reserved for persons belonging to the Scheduled Castes, Scheduled Tribes, Other Backward Classes and women, as prescribed by the state government. Not more than fifty percent of total seats shall be reserved across all categories, and not more than fifty percent of seats reserved for each category shall be reserved for women.

=== Mayor and deputy mayor ===
The corporators elect one of their members as mayor and another as deputy mayor at the first meeting of the newly constituted corporation. Both offices carry a term of 30 months (co-terminus with the first half of the five-year corporation council term), with fresh elections held at the mid-term for the remaining 30 months. A no-confidence motion against either officeholder may be moved only after six months from the commencement of their term; once defeated, another cannot be moved for the next six months.

The offices are subject to reservation by rotation for Scheduled Castes, Scheduled Tribes, Other Backward Classes and women, as prescribed by the state government.

As of May 2026, both offices are vacant pending the 2026 corporation elections.

=== Commissioner ===
The commissioner is appointed by the state government and serves as the chief executive officer of the corporation. The commissioner must be an officer not below the rank of secretary to the government and holds office for a term of two years, subject to the pleasure of the Government. The commissioner supervises joint commissioners and other subordinate officers, implements resolutions of the City Corporation and the Standing Committees, and conducts all official correspondence between the corporation and the Government or other authorities.

In the absence of an elected corporation council, the corporation is administered by the Greater Bengaluru Authority Chief Commissioner acting jointly with the BCCC Commissioner.

=== Joint commissioners (zonal) ===
For administrative decentralisation, the BCCC is divided into two zones — Zone 1 and Zone 2 — each headed by a joint commissioner appointed by the state government at a rank not below deputy secretary to Government or Karnataka Administrative Service (senior scale). The joint commissioner of each zone serves as the nodal authority for civic administration within that zone and coordinates Ward Committees and delegated functions.

=== Standing committees ===
The act establishes seven standing committees for the BCCC, each consisting of a minimum of nine and a maximum of fifteen corporators (including a chairman elected by committee members). Each standing committee has a term of 30 months. The mayor and deputy mayor are ex-officio members of all standing committees:

1. Standing Committee for Administration, Education and Social Justice
2. Standing Committee for Revenue and Finance
3. Standing Committee for Public Works and Engineering
4. Standing Committee for Public Health and Disaster Management
5. Standing Committee for Forest, Environment, Ecology, Lakes, Horticulture and Fisheries
6. Standing Committee for Infrastructure
7. Standing Committee for Audit and Accounts

=== Assembly Constituency level consultative and co-ordination committee ===
For each Vidhan Sabha constituency falling within the BCCC, the state government constitutes an Assembly Constituency level consultative and co-ordination committee chaired by the member of the Legislative Assembly for that constituency, with the corporators of that area as members. This body meets at least once a month to coordinate with government agencies, monitor project implementation and address public grievances.

=== Ward committees ===
Each of the 63 wards has a ward committee. The corporator representing the ward serves as chairperson. The committee consists of 15 members in total — the chairperson plus 14 others, comprising at least two members from Scheduled Castes or Scheduled Tribes, at least three women, at least two members representing registered Residents' Welfare Associations (active for not less than three years and registered within the ward), and seven members nominated by the corporation from among the ward's registered voters. The remaining seven members (excluding the seven Corporation nominees) are selected by random draw of lots from eligible applicants. The term of each ward committee is 20 months.

=== Ward Sabha ===
Each ward has a Ward Sabha consisting of all persons registered as voters in that ward. The Ward Sabha provides inputs for the formulation of the Annual Ward Development Plan, reviews project implementation, and participates in general ward-level meetings convened by the ward committee. The ward committee is required to hold the Ward Sabha at least once in every quarter.

== Elections ==
=== 2026 elections ===
The 2026 Greater Bengaluru Authority elections are the first elections to be held for all five corporations since the dissolution of the BBMP. The Supreme Court of India directed that polls be completed by 31 August 2026; the Karnataka government's request for an extension to September 2026 was rejected. All 63 wards of the BCCC are scheduled to go to the polls simultaneously. This will be the first direct election of Corporators to the BCCC; the corporation is a new entity with no prior electoral history.

=== Previous: 2015 BBMP election ===
The predecessor election was the 2015 Bruhat Bengaluru Mahanagara Palike election, held on 22 August 2015 for the undivided 198-ward BBMP. The more than eleven-year gap between that election and the 2026 GBA polls represents an unprecedented discontinuity in Bengaluru's municipal electoral history.

== Wards ==
The BCCC comprises 63 wards across a 78 km^{2} (30 sq mi) area spanning the historic centre of Bengaluru. The ward boundaries are as notified by the Karnataka Government in November 2025.

Wards of the Bengaluru Central City Corporation
| Ward No. | Ward name | Ward No. | Ward name |
|---|---|---|---|
| 1 | Ramaswamy Palya | 33 | Dharmaraya Swamy Temple Ward |
| 2 | Jayamahal | 34 | D.V Gundappa Ward |
| 3 | Vasanth Nagar | 35 | Hombegowda Nagara |
| 4 | Sampangirama Nagar | 36 | Someshwara Nagara |
| 5 | Shivajinagar | 37 | BHEL Ward |
| 6 | Bharathi Nagar | 38 | Kanakanapalya |
| 7 | K Kamaraj Ward | 39 | Venkat Reddy Nagara |
| 8 | Halasuru | 40 | Ashoka Pillar |
| 9 | Hoysala Nagara Central | 41 | V.V Puram |
| 10 | Cox Town | 42 | Sunkenahalli |
| 11 | Old Baiyappanahalli | 43 | Devaraj Urs Ward |
| 12 | Kasturi Nagar | 44 | Chamarajpet |
| 13 | Krishnaiahnapalya | 45 | K.R Market |
| 14 | Nagavarapalya | 46 | Cheluvadi Palya |
| 15 | Indiranagar | 47 | IPD Salappa Ward |
| 16 | New Thippasandra | 48 | Azad Nagar |
| 17 | Kaggadasapura | 49 | Kasturbha Nagar |
| 18 | G.M Palya | 50 | JJR Nagara |
| 19 | Jeevan Bhimanagar | 51 | Old Guddadahalli |
| 20 | Kodihalli | 52 | Padarayanapura |
| 21 | Konena Agrahara | 53 | Rayapuram |
| 22 | Domluru | 54 | Binnypete |
| 23 | Jogpalya | 55 | Bhuvaneshwari Nagar |
| 24 | Agaram | 56 | Gopalpura |
| 25 | Ashokanagar | 57 | Cottonpete |
| 26 | Vannarpet | 58 | Chickpete |
| 27 | Ambedkarnagar | 59 | Nehru Nagar |
| 28 | Neelasandra | 60 | Seshadripuram |
| 29 | Austin Town | 61 | Dattatreya Ward |
| 30 | Vinayakanagar | 62 | Swatantra Palya Ward |
| 31 | Shanthinagar | 63 | Okalipuram |
| 32 | Silver Jubilee Park Ward | | |

== Functions and responsibilities ==
The BCCC's responsibilities under the Greater Bengaluru Governance Act, 2024 include obligatory functions such as property taxation, building regulation and zoning enforcement, public health and sanitation, solid waste management, maintenance of roads and stormwater drains, street lighting, parks and public spaces, urban forestry, and administration of markets and slaughterhouses. The BCCC also coordinates with the Bengaluru Water Supply and Sewerage Board on water supply and sewerage, and with the Bangalore Development Authority and other statutory bodies on land use and development matters.

The City Corporation Fund receives revenues from property tax, professional tax, advertisement charges, service fees, and state and central government grants. In cases where the BCCC cannot generate sufficient revenue for its obligatory functions, the state government provides grants-in-aid on the basis of recommendations from the Karnataka State Finance Commission.

== See also ==
- Greater Bengaluru Authority
- Bruhat Bengaluru Mahanagara Palike
- 2026 Greater Bengaluru Authority elections
- Bengaluru North City Corporation
- Bengaluru South City Corporation
- Bengaluru East City Corporation
- Bengaluru West City Corporation
- Administrative divisions of Bengaluru
- List of mayors of Bengaluru
