= Mahadevapura, Bengaluru =

Mahadevapura
- Neighbourhood
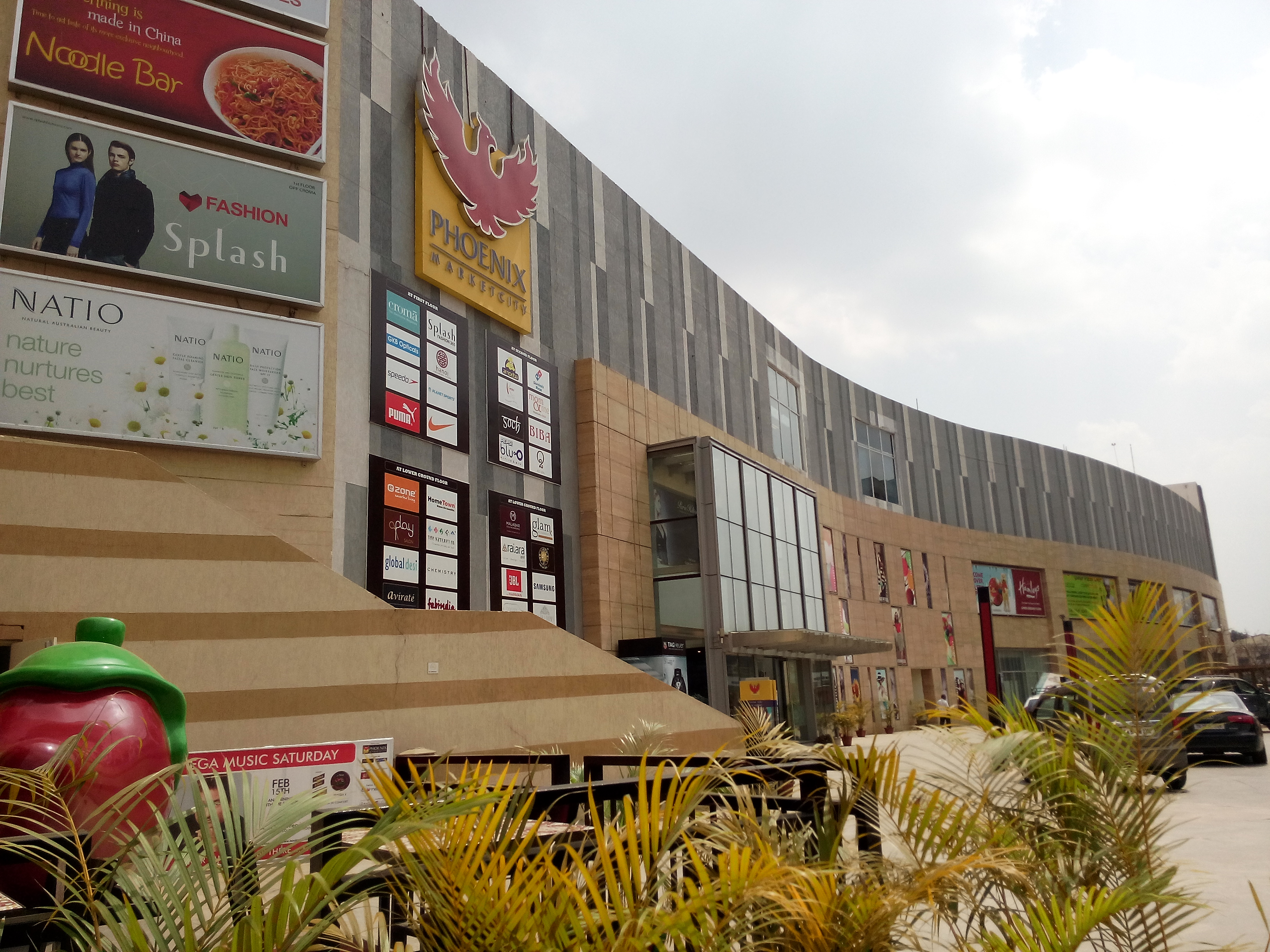
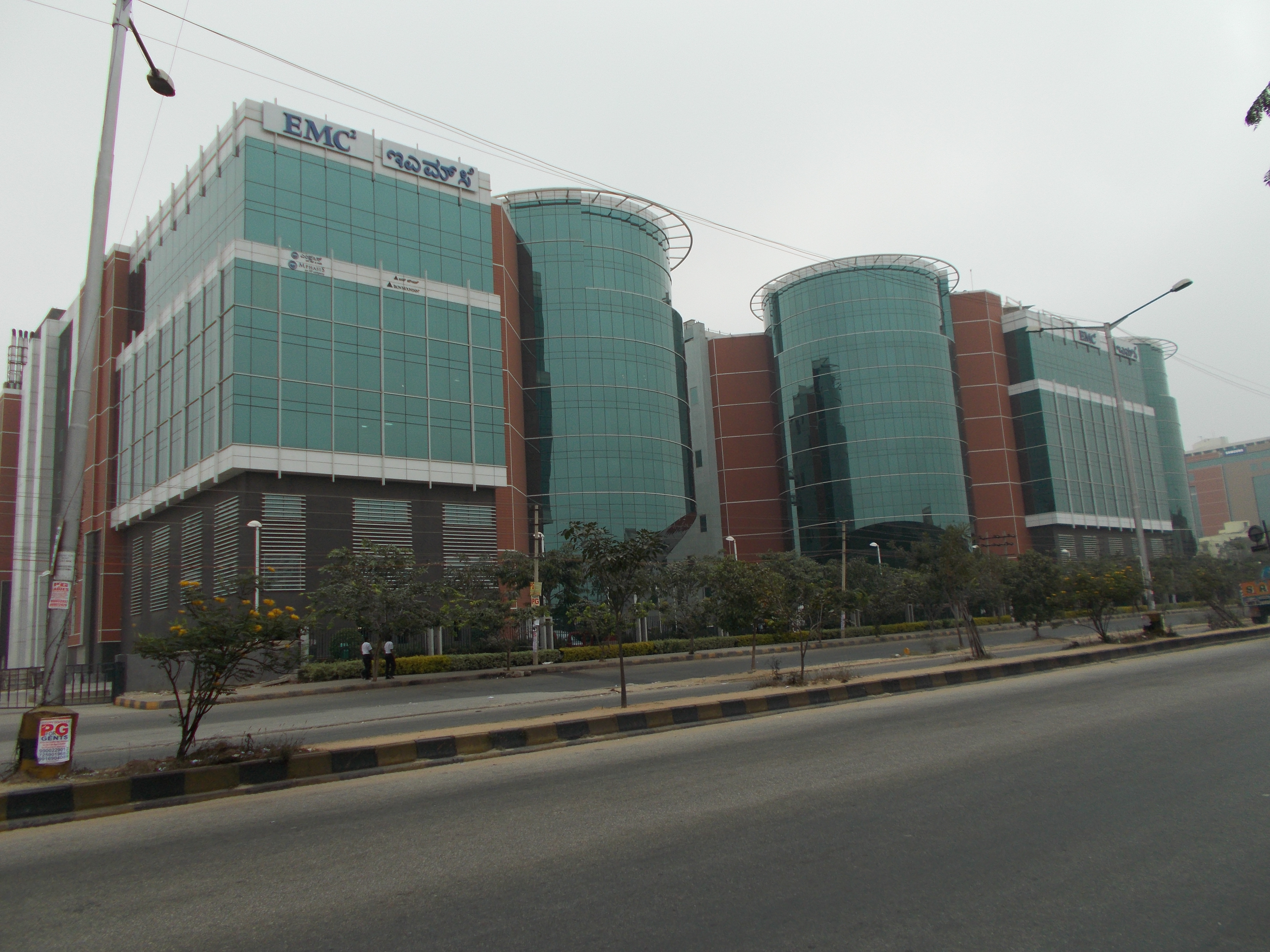
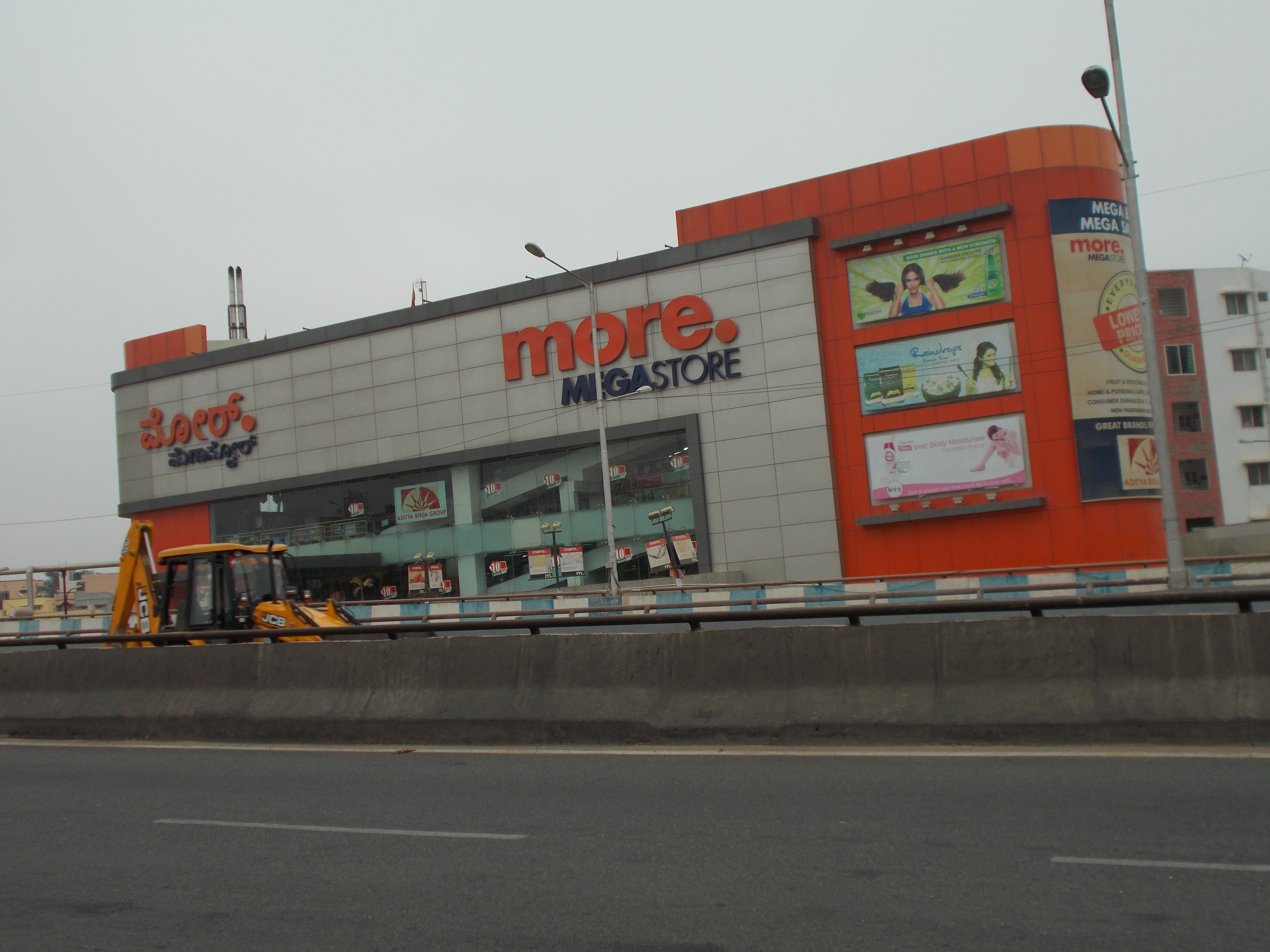
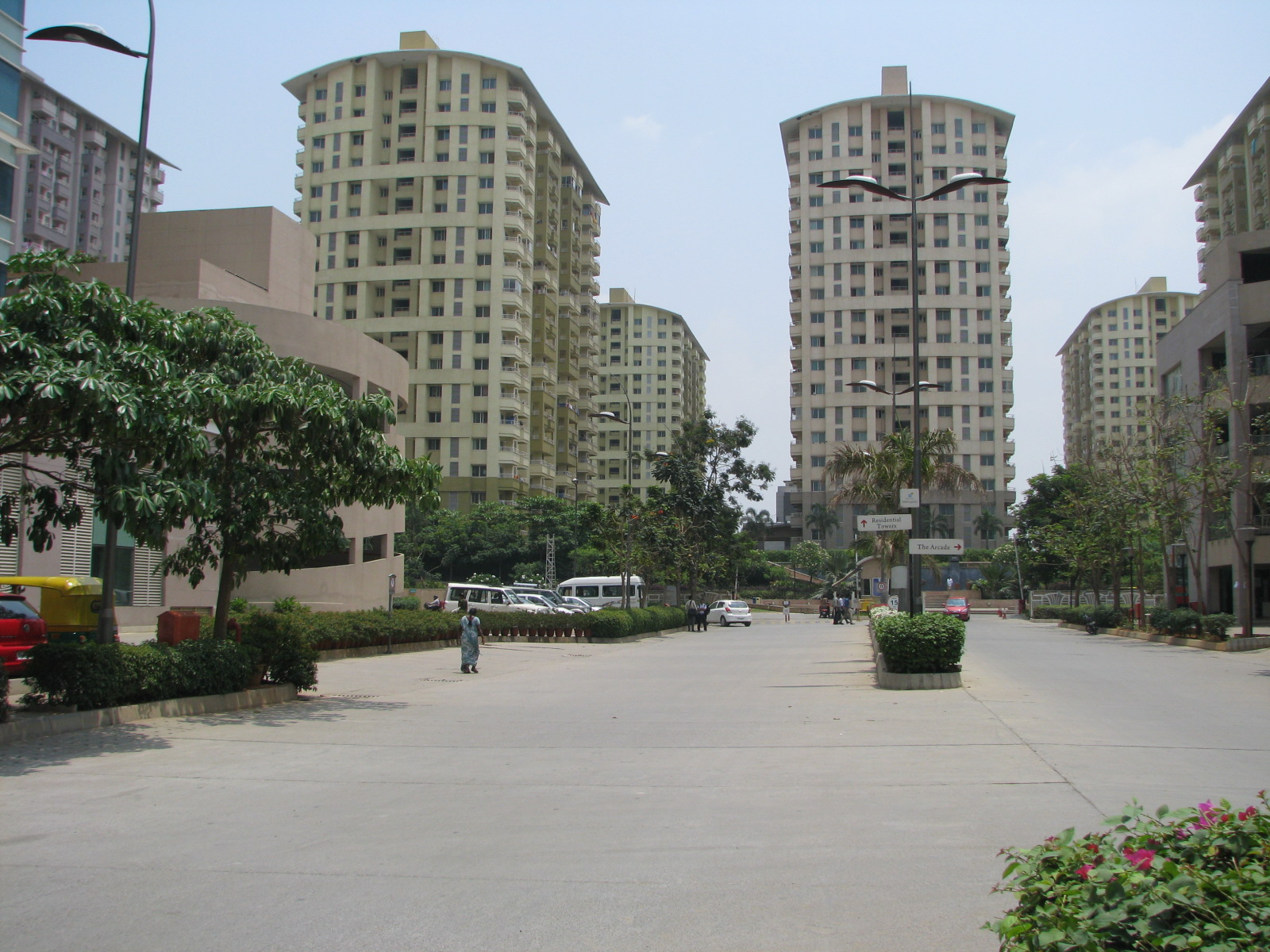
- (Clockwise from top left) Phoenix Marketcity, Dell EMC campus on Outer Ring Road, Brigade Metropolis, Candeur Carlisle A supermarket seen from Mahadevapura Bridge

- Location in Bangalore, India
- Coordinates: 12.99°N 77.70°E
- Country: India
- State: Karnataka
- District: Bengaluru Urban
- Metro: Bangalore

Population (2001)
  - Total: 135,597

Languages
  - Official: Kannada
- Time zone: UTC+5:30 (IST)
- PIN: 560048

Mahadevapura is a suburb and one of the zones of BBMP in Bangalore Urban district in the Indian state of Karnataka. It was a city municipal council. It is well connected with Outer Ring Road, Whitefield Road and Krishnarajapura Railway Station is the nearest station to board trains. It is a developing area, which has a high growth potential in terms of residential development. Leading schools, shopping malls, showrooms have come up in the area.

== Demographics ==
As of 2001 India census, Mahadevapura had a population of 135,597. Males constitute 54% of the population and females 46%. Mahadevapura has an average literacy rate of 73%, higher than the national average of 59.5%: male literacy is 79%, and female literacy is 66%. In Mahadevapura, 12% of the population is under 6 years of age.

== Electoral Aspects ==
Mahadevapura is a constituency in the Karnataka Legislative Assembly. Its presently represented by Manjula Aravind Limbavali. She was elected in the 2023 election from here with 181,731 votes defeating H Nagesh

== Information technology hub ==
Mahadevapura has become a major information technology hub in recent years. It houses several IT companies such as Accenture, Dell EMC, Ericsson, Hewlett Packard Enterprise, Mphasis, Samsung, Sapient Corporation, eClinicalWorks and Wells Fargo. It also has a few of the major Big 4 Deloitte, EY offices, Hewlett Packard IWF Campus. It is also in close proximity to ITPL and other IT hubs such as Whitefield, Marathahalli and Bellandur.
