= Arekere =

- Neighbourhood
- Location within Bengaluru
- Coordinates: 12.89°N 77.60°E
- Country: India
- State: Karnataka
- Metro: Bangalore

Languages
  - Official: Kannada
- Time zone: UTC+5:30 (IST)
- PIN: 560076
- Vehicle registration: KA-51
- Lok Sabha constituency: Bangalore South
- Vidhan Sabha constituency: Bommanahalli
- Planning agency: Bangalore Development Authority
- Nearest metro station: IIM Bangalore (Pink Line)

Arekere is a residential area along Bannerghatta Road in south Bangalore, which divides it into two halves. The name (are, half; kere, lake) derives from a water reservoir in the area. It is bordered by Vijaya Bank Employees Layout to the northeast, Hulimavu to the southeast, and Doresanipalya and Panduranga Nagar to the west.

Localities in and around Arekere include Arekere MICO Layout, a Bangalore Development Authority layout developed in the late 1970s, as well as Ramaswamy Layout, Samrat Layout, Panduranga Nagar, Puttenhalli, Hulimavu, Bilekahalli, Shantiniketan Layout and Sarvabhoumanagar.

== History ==
Arekere was originally a village on the southern outskirts of Bangalore. It takes its name from the lake that lies between the former villages of Arekere and Hulimavu, which is estimated to be about a hundred years old.

As Bangalore expanded southwards along Bannerghatta Road, the area was urbanised through residential layouts, including colonies approved by the Bangalore Development Authority (BDA) such as Vysya Bank Colony. Part of the lake bed was built over in the process; a 2017 study by the Indian Institute of Science recorded the lake's original extent as 37.53 acres, of which about 7.88 acres had been encroached.

Development close to the lake has left parts of Arekere prone to flooding. In October 2012 the lake breached and sewage flooded a neighbouring layout. During heavy rain in 2016, most streets in Vysya Bank Colony were flooded by overflow from the lake. On 24 November 2019, a breach in the bund of neighbouring Hulimavu Lake flooded more than 800 houses in the Arakere ward.

== Environment ==
Arekere Lake lies in the Koramangala–Challaghatta valley. A 2017 study by the Indian Institute of Science found its water to be highly polluted and blackish, with most of the surface covered by water hyacinth, and placed it in the lowest water-quality class (Class E), fit only for irrigation, industrial cooling and controlled waste disposal.

Concern over the lake's condition led residents to form the Arakere Neighbourhood Improvement Trust (ANIT) in June 2012 to campaign against encroachment and sewage inflow. After the lake breached later that year, the Bangalore Development Authority prepared a plan to develop it at a cost of ₹14 crore (US$1.5 million).

== Demographics ==
At the 2011 census, ward 193 (Arakere) of the Bruhat Bengaluru Mahanagara Palike, which covered Arekere and neighbouring localities, had a population of 58,355. The wider Bommanahalli Assembly constituency, in which Arekere lies, more than doubled in population between 2001 and 2011, from 190,861 to 463,568.

== Governance ==
Until 2025, Arekere fell within ward 193 (Arakere) in the Bommanahalli zone of the Bruhat Bengaluru Mahanagara Palike (BBMP). On 2 September 2025, the BBMP was replaced by the Greater Bengaluru Authority and five new city corporations. Arekere, as part of the Bommanahalli Assembly constituency, comes under the Bengaluru South City Corporation.

Arekere lies in the Bommanahalli Assembly constituency, which has been represented in the Karnataka Legislative Assembly by M. Satish Reddy of the Bharatiya Janata Party since its creation in 2008; he was re-elected in 2023. The constituency is part of the Bangalore South Lok Sabha constituency, represented by Tejasvi Surya of the Bharatiya Janata Party since 2019 and re-elected in 2024.

== Infrastructure and amenities ==
Arekere is largely residential, with healthcare, educational, retail and leisure facilities located along the Bannerghatta Road corridor.

Healthcare: Two large multi-speciality hospitals are located nearby. Apollo Hospitals is situated opposite IIM Bangalore, and Fortis Hospital has operated on Bannerghatta Road since 2006.

Education: Institutions in the vicinity include IIM Bangalore and the Bannerghatta Road campus of Christ University in neighbouring Hulimavu. Schools in the area include Stepping Stones, BGS National Public School, Mitra Academy and AECS Magnolia Maaruti Public School.

Shopping and entertainment: The Bangalore Central mall at SJR Spectrum, near Arekere Gate, houses a Cinépolis multiplex. Royal Meenakshi Mall in neighbouring Hulimavu, a nine-level mall that opened in 2011, includes a seven-screen Cinépolis multiplex, a food court and a family entertainment centre. The stretch of Bannerghatta Road around Arekere also has a number of restaurants, cafés and bars, including an outlet of the Empire restaurant chain.

== Accessibility ==
Arekere lies on Bannerghatta Road, one of the main arterial roads of south Bangalore, and is served by both the metro and city buses. The nearest metro station is IIM Bangalore (officially renamed Bilekahalli–IIMB) on the Pink Line of Namma Metro. The station is on the line's elevated Kalena Agrahara–S.G. Palya section, which runs along Bannerghatta Road and opened to the public on 14 November 2026. BMTC buses from Arekere Gate connect the locality to Kempegowda Bus Station (Majestic), K.R. Market and other parts of the city, and the Vayu Vajra KIA-14 service links Bannerghatta Road to Kempegowda International Airport.

== See also ==
- Arekere Lake
- Vijaya bank layout
