= Bengaluru West City Corporation =

Local government of western Bengaluru

Bengaluru West City Corporation Beṅgaḷūru Paścima Nagara Pālike
- Emblem of Bengaluru West City Corporation

Type
- Type: Municipal Corporation

History
- Founded: 2 September 2025 (11 months ago)
- Preceded by: Bruhat Bengaluru Mahanagara Palike

Leadership
- Administrator / GBA Chief Commissioner (In absence of Mayor): Maheshwar Rao M., IAS
- Municipal Commissioner: Vasanth Kumar R., IAS
- Mayor: Vacant, since 2 September 2025
- Deputy Mayor: Vacant, since 2 September 2025
- Leader of the Opposition: Vacant, since 2 September 2025
- Seats: 112

Elections
- Voting system: First-past-the-post
- Last election: New body
- Next election: 2026

Motto
- Kannada is our breath; Kannada is indeed, evergreen

Meeting place
- Dasarahalli Zonal Office, Dasarahalli, Bengaluru, Karnataka

Website
- Bengaluru West City Corporation

Footnotes
- Governed by: Greater Bengaluru Governance Act, 2024 (Karnataka Act No. 36 of 2025)

The Bengaluru West City Corporation (BWCC) is one of the five municipal corporations constituted under the Greater Bengaluru Authority (GBA) to govern the city of Bengaluru, Karnataka, India. It covers the western zone of Bengaluru, with its administrative headquarters at Dasarahalli. The BWCC was formally constituted on 2 September 2025 by a notification of the Government of Karnataka under the Greater Bengaluru Governance Act, 2024, published in the Karnataka Gazette Extra Ordinary No. 522 (English) and No. 523 (Kannada) of that date, superseding the Bruhat Bengaluru Mahanagara Palike (BBMP).

The BWCC has the most wards (112) of all five corporations, spread across 164 km^{2} (63 sq mi). It encompasses a wide range of localities from the industrial and residential west including Malleshwaram, Rajajinagar, Basaveshwaranagar, Kengeri, Dasarahalli, and Yeshwanthpura. It has 27,33,471 registered voters across 2,380 polling stations — the highest voter base of all five corporations.

== History ==
Bengaluru's undivided civic administration was constituted in 1949 as the City of Bangalore Municipal Corporation, renamed the Bangalore City Corporation in 1951, then the Bangalore Mahanagara Palike in 1989, and the Bruhat Bengaluru Mahanagara Palike (BBMP) in 2006 following the annexation of surrounding municipal and town councils into an expanded Bengaluru. The BBMP, by then a single 198-ward corporation covering the whole city, was dissolved in 2025 and replaced by five independent City Corporations, of which the BWCC is one, coordinated by the newly created Greater Bengaluru Authority (GBA) as an apex body.

=== Greater Bengaluru Governance Act, 2024 ===
The Greater Bengaluru Governance Act, 2024 (Karnataka Act No. 36 of 2025) was enacted by the Karnataka Legislative Assembly and received the assent of the Governor of Karnataka on 23 April 2025, first published in the Karnataka Gazette Extra Ordinary on the 24th day of April, 2025. The Act dissolved the BBMP and replaced it with the Greater Bengaluru Authority as an apex coordinating body, under which five City Corporations were constituted to independently govern distinct geographic zones of Bengaluru.

=== Preliminary notification and public consultation ===
On 19 July 2025, the Government of Karnataka published Gazette Extra Ordinary No. 403 under notification No.UDD 170 BBS 2025(e), which proposed the constitution of five City Corporations with specified boundaries and invited objections and suggestions from all affected persons within thirty days. Following consideration of objections and suggestions by the State Government, the final notification constituting the corporations was issued on 2 September 2025 and signed by Nandakumar B., Under Secretary to Government, Urban Development Department (BBMP-2 and Coordination).

=== Ward delimitation ===
The Karnataka government conducted a fresh ward delimitation exercise in 2025, replacing the earlier BBMP structure. The BWCC was assigned 112 wards across a 164 km^{2} (63 sq mi) area — the largest ward count of all five corporations, reflecting the dense residential and industrial fabric of western Bengaluru.

=== Constitution of the corporation ===
The BWCC came into existence on 2 September 2025 by gazette notification, formally superseding BBMP administration within its area and transferring assets, staff and liabilities to the new corporation under the transitional provisions of the Act.

== Boundaries ==
Wards of the Bengaluru West City Corporation within the Greater Bengaluru Authority area

The boundaries of the BWCC were defined in Schedule-I of Gazette Extra Ordinary No. 522 (2 September 2025). The corporation is bounded on the north by areas beyond the GBA jurisdiction (BDA areas) and the Bengaluru North City Corporation, on the east by the Bengaluru Central City Corporation and the Bengaluru South City Corporation, and on the south and west by areas under the Bangalore Development Authority (BDA) jurisdiction.

=== North-east boundary (with Bengaluru North City Corporation) ===
The north-eastern boundary begins on Jayamahal Road and runs north-west, continuing north along Sri Ramanamharshi Road (NH7), then north-west along D Rajgopal Road and west along MSR Hospital Road. It continues north along 7th Cross Road, west along 80 Feet Road, and north-west along New BEL Road. The boundary then follows the railway track south-west, runs south along Sir MS Ramaiah Road, south-west along B Narayanaswamappa Road, and west along Rehman Khan Road, ending in the direction of Tumkur Road (NH75).

=== East boundary (with Bengaluru Central City Corporation) ===
The eastern boundary begins at KC Palace Club and runs south-east along Jayamahal Main Road, then west along the railway track, north-west along Palace Road, and south-west along Sheshadripuram Main Road. It continues west along the 6th Cross Road and 3rd Cross Road, north along Nagappa Street, and west along the 2nd Main Road before following the Vrishabhavathi River westward. The boundary traverses the 10th and 11th Cross Roads, then runs south along Sampige Road and west along MKK Road. After running south-east along the railway track, south along the 5th Main Road and south along the 9th Main Road, it turns west along 120 metres, then south along the 1st Main Road and west along 3rd Cross Bramhapura Road. It then follows a nala south to the Vrishabhavathi River, before running east along Magadi Main Road, south along the 8th Cross Road, and continuing via Kaveri Nadi Road, Sameer Pura Main Road, Laxmipura Main Road, Kumaraswamy Temple Road, Mount Joy Road, Bugle Rock Road and Krishna Rajendra Road, ending at United Hospital / Best Surgical Hospital & Family Care Clinic near the 15th Main Road.

=== South-east boundary (with Bengaluru South City Corporation) ===
The south-eastern boundary begins at Aashirwad Ladies PG and runs south along the 10th Main Road, west along Aurobindo Marg, and south along 3rd Main Road. It continues west along 36th Cross Road and along Krishna Rajendra Road, east along 27th Cross Road, south along Kanakapura Main Road, and south-west along Subramanyapura Road. The boundary then runs north along the 9th Main Road, west along 34th Cross Road, and south along 13th Main Road, before turning north-west along the Outer Ring Road, south along 7th Main Road, and south-west approximately 410 metres. It continues west along Kamakya Main Road, west along the 9th Cross Road and 2nd Cross Road, north along the 4th Main Road, east along Kengal Hanumanthaiah Park, and south along the 1st Main Road. The boundary then runs west along the 6th Cross Road, south along the 2nd Main Road, west along the 4th Cross Road, north along the 3rd Main Road, and south-west along a nala, ending at the NICE Road via Hanumagiri Hills.

=== South and west boundary (with BDA areas) ===
The southern and western boundary follows the NICE Road south, then traces a complex path via the Bengaluru-Mysore Expressway (NH275), Kengeri area, Hoskere Lake, Sonnenahalli Park, Dodda Basthi Main Road, Vishveshwarayya Nagar, Nuggi Palya Road, Magadi Road, and eventually returns to Tumkur Road (NH75) via Anchepalya Lake and Savani Transports.

=== North boundary (with BDA areas) ===
The northern boundary follows Tumkur Road (NH75) from the point where the BWCC–BNCC boundary meets it, running westward and south-westward to the BDA jurisdiction limit near Savani Transports, Nelmangala branch.

== Governance ==
The BWCC provides municipal corporation services within its jurisdiction. Strategic functions across all five corporations — such as inter-zonal transport, drinking water bulk supply, and metropolitan planning — are coordinated by the Greater Bengaluru Authority. No corporation council has yet been elected as of the article's most recent update; administration is carried out by state-appointed officers pending the 2026 elections.

=== Legal and administrative status ===
Predecessor authority / status	Period
City of Bangalore Municipal Corporation	1949–1951
Bangalore City Corporation	1951–1989
Bangalore Mahanagara Palike	1989–2006
Bruhat Bengaluru Mahanagara Palike (undivided, 198 wards)	2006–2025
Constituted as an independent corporation; administered by state-appointed officers pending first election	2 September 2025–present

No corporation council has yet been elected, so there is no political control history to report.

=== Leadership ===
Political leadership of an elected corporation council is vested in the Mayor, assisted by a Deputy Mayor, both elected by the corporators for a 30-month term. Since no corporation council has yet been elected, the Mayoralty and Deputy Mayoralty have remained vacant since the BWCC's constitution. In the interim, administrative leadership has been provided by state-appointed officers:

Officer	Role	From	To
Maheshwar Rao M., IAS	Administrator / GBA Chief Commissioner (in absence of mayor)	2 Sept 2025	incumbent
Vasanth Kumar R., IAS	Municipal Commissioner	2 Sept 2025	incumbent

=== Composition ===
As the BWCC has not yet held a Corporation election, there are no elected political groupings to report. All offices are vacant pending the 2026 elections:

Office	Status
Mayor	Vacant
Deputy Mayor	Vacant
Leader of the Opposition	Vacant
Corporators (112 seats)	All vacant — 0 of 112 filled

The next election is due by December 2026, per Supreme Court direction.

=== Mayor and Deputy Mayor ===
The corporators elect one of their members as Mayor and another as Deputy Mayor at the first meeting of the newly constituted corporation. Both offices carry a term of 30 months (co-terminus with the first half of the five-year corporation council term), with fresh elections held at the mid-term for the remaining 30 months. A no-confidence motion against either officeholder may be moved only after six months from the commencement of their term; once defeated, another cannot be moved for the next six months. The offices are subject to reservation by rotation for Scheduled Castes, Scheduled Tribes, Other Backward Classes and women, as prescribed by the state government. The BWCC's corporation council, once elected, will consist of 112 directly elected members (Corporators), one from each ward, elected through the first-past-the-post system, for a term of five years from the date of its first meeting, unless dissolved earlier. Seats are reserved for persons belonging to the Scheduled Castes, Scheduled Tribes, Other Backward Classes and women, as prescribed by the state government; not more than fifty percent of total seats shall be reserved across all categories, and not more than fifty percent of seats reserved for each category shall be reserved for women.

=== Commissioner ===
The commissioner is appointed by the state government and serves as the chief executive officer of the corporation. The commissioner must be an officer not below the rank of Secretary to the Government and holds office for a term of two years, subject to the pleasure of the Government. The commissioner supervises Joint Commissioners and other subordinate officers, implements resolutions of the City Corporation and the Standing Committees, and conducts all official correspondence between the corporation and the Government or other authorities.

In the absence of an elected corporation council, the corporation is administered by the Greater Bengaluru Authority Chief Commissioner acting jointly with the BWCC Commissioner.

=== Joint Commissioners (Zonal) ===
For administrative decentralisation, the BWCC is divided into two zones — Zone 1 and Zone 2 — each headed by a Joint Commissioner appointed by the state government at a rank not below deputy secretary to Government or Karnataka Administrative Service (senior scale). The Joint Commissioner of each zone serves as the nodal authority for civic administration within that zone and coordinates Ward Committees and delegated functions.

=== Standing committees ===
The act establishes seven standing committees for the BWCC, each consisting of a minimum of nine and a maximum of fifteen corporators (including a chairman elected by committee members). Each standing committee has a term of 30 months. The mayor and deputy mayor are ex-officio members of all standing committees:

1. Standing Committee for Administration, Education and Social Justice
2. Standing Committee for Revenue and Finance
3. Standing Committee for Public Works and Engineering
4. Standing Committee for Public Health and Disaster Management
5. Standing Committee for Forest, Environment, Ecology, Lakes, Horticulture and Fisheries
6. Standing Committee for Infrastructure
7. Standing Committee for Audit and Accounts

=== Assembly Constituency Level Consultative and Co-ordination Committee ===
For each Vidhan Sabha constituency falling within the BWCC, the state government constitutes an Assembly Constituency Level Consultative and Co-ordination Committee chaired by the member of the Legislative Assembly for that constituency, with the corporators of that area as members. This body meets at least once a month to coordinate with government agencies, monitor project implementation and address public grievances.

=== Ward committees ===
Each of the 112 wards has a ward committee. The corporator representing the ward serves as chairperson. The committee consists of 15 members in total — the chairperson plus 14 others, comprising at least two members from Scheduled Castes or Scheduled Tribes, at least three women, at least two members representing registered Residents' Welfare Associations (active for not less than three years and registered within the ward), and seven members nominated by the corporation from among the ward's registered voters. The remaining seven members (excluding the seven Corporation nominees) are selected by random draw of lots from eligible applicants. The term of each Ward Committee is 20 months.

=== Ward Sabha ===
Each ward has a Ward Sabha consisting of all persons registered as voters in that ward. The Ward Sabha provides inputs for the formulation of the Annual Ward Development Plan, reviews project implementation, and participates in general ward-level meetings convened by the Ward Committee. The Ward Committee is required to hold the Ward Sabha at least once in every quarter.

== Elections ==
=== 2026 elections ===
The 2026 Greater Bengaluru Authority elections are the first elections to be held for all five corporations since the dissolution of the BBMP. The Supreme Court of India directed that polls be completed by 31 August 2026; the Karnataka government's request for an extension to September 2026 was rejected. All 112 wards of the BWCC are scheduled to go to the polls simultaneously. This will be the first direct election of Corporators to the BWCC; the corporation is a new entity with no prior electoral history.

=== Previous: 2015 BBMP election ===
The predecessor election was the 2015 Bruhat Bengaluru Mahanagara Palike election, held on 22 August 2015 for the undivided 198-ward BBMP. The more than eleven-year gap between that election and the 2026 GBA polls represents an unprecedented discontinuity in Bengaluru's municipal electoral history.

== Wards ==
The BWCC comprises 112 wards across a 164 km^{2} (63 sq mi) area spanning the western residential, industrial and outer ring belt of Bengaluru, as notified by the Karnataka Government in November 2025. The corporation is administratively divided into two zones, Zone 1 and Zone 2, each headed by a Joint Commissioner.

The council wards are listed under their Karnataka Legislative Assembly constituency below:

Dasarahalli	Yeshwanthapura	Rajarajeshwarinagar
1. Nagasandra; 2. Chokkasandra; 3. Nelagadaranahalli; 4. Parvathi Nagar; 5. Rajeshwarinagar; 6. Shivapura; 7. Rajagopala Nagara; 8. Hegganahalli; 9. Srigandhanagar; 10. Sunkadakatte	11. Dodda Bidarakallu; 12. Andrahalli; 13. Nada Prabhu Kempegowda Nagara; 14. Herohalli; 15. Byadarahalli; 16. Ullal; 17. Nagadevanahalli; 18. Kengal Hanumanthaiah West; 19. Shivanapalya; 20. Kengeri Kote Ward; 21. Kengeri	22. Bangarappa Nagara; 23. Rajarajeshwari Nagara; 24. Jnana Bharathi Ward; 25. Vinayaka Layout; 26. Mallathahalli; 27. Srigandada Kaval; 28. Kottegepalya; 29. Chowdeshwari Nagar; 30. Kempegowda Layout; 31. Freedom Fighter Ward; 32. Laggere; 33. Lakshmi Devi Nagar; 34. Peenya; 35. Goraguntepalya
Mahalakshmi Layout	Malleshwaram	Rajajinagar
36. Nalwadi Krishnaraja Wadiyar Ward; 37. Dr. Puneeth Rajkumar Ward; 38. Nandini Layout; 39. Jai Maruthi Nagar; 40. Mahalakshmipuram; 41. Nagapura; 42. Raja Mayura Varma Ward; 43. Kethamaranahalli; 44. Shankar Mutt; 45. Shakthi Ganapathi Nagara; 46. Kamalanagara; 47. Vrishabhavathi Nagar	48. Mathikere; 49. Aramane Nagara; 50. Sadashiva Nagara; 51. Rajamahal; 52. Kodandarampura; 53. Malleshwaram; 54. Subedarpalya; 55. Subramanyanagara; 56. Gayathri Nagara; 57. Kuvempu Ward	58. Dayanand Nagara; 59. Bandi Reddy Circle Ward; 60. Prakash Nagara; 61. Da.Ra. Bendre Ward; 62. Rama Mandira; 63. Rajajinagara; 64. Shivanagara; 65. Manjunath Nagara; 66. Sane Guruvana Halli; 67. Basaveshwara Nagara; 68. Kamakshipalya
Govindraj Nagar	Vijay Nagar	Basavanagudi
69. Agrahara Dasarahalli; 70. Dr Rajkumar Ward; 71. Thimmenahalli; 72. Kaveripura; 73. Dr. Vishnuvardhan Ward; 74. Pattegar Palya; 75. Marenahalli West; 76. Moodalapalya; 77. Maruthi Mandira Ward; 78. Anubhava Nagara; 79. Nagarbhavi; 80. Chandra Layout; 81. Nayanda Halli	82. Attigupe; 83. Hampi Nagar; 84. Hosahalli; 85. Adi Chunchanagiri Ward; 86. Vidyaranyanagara; 87. K.P Agrahara; 88. Sangolli Rayanna Ward; 89. Bapuji Nagara; 90. Krishnadevaraya Ward; 91. Gali Anjaneya Temple Ward; 92. Muneshwara Block; 93. Avalahalli; 94. Deepanjali Nagara	95. Swamy Vivekananda Ward; 96. Kathriguppe; 97. Srinivasa Nagara; 98. Ashoka Nagara; 99. T.R Shamanna Nagar; 100. Srinagar; 101. Kempambudhi Ward; 102. Hanumanthanagar; 103. N.R Colony; 104. Thyagarajnagar
Padmanabhanagar
105. Yediyuru; 106. Devagiri Temple Ward; 107. Dharmagiri Ward; 108. Ganesh Mandira Ward; 109. Kamakya Layout; 110. Chikkalasandra; 111. Ittamadu; 112. Hosakerehalli		

=== List of wards ===
Wards of the Bengaluru West City Corporation
Ward no.	Ward name	Zone	Ward no.	Ward name	Zone
1	Nagasandra	Zone 1	57	Kuvempu Ward	Zone 2
2	Chokkasandra	Zone 1	58	Dayanand Nagara	Zone 2
3	Nelagadaranahalli	Zone 1	59	Bandi Reddy Circle Ward	Zone 2
4	Parvathi Nagar	Zone 1	60	Prakash Nagara	Zone 2
5	Rajeshwarinagar	Zone 1	61	Da.Ra. Bendre Ward	Zone 2
6	Shivapura	Zone 1	62	Rama Mandira	Zone 2
7	Rajagopala Nagara	Zone 1	63	Rajajinagara	Zone 2
8	Hegganahalli	Zone 1	64	Shivanagara	Zone 2
9	Srigandhanagar	Zone 1	65	Manjunath Nagara	Zone 2
10	Sunkadakatte	Zone 1	66	Sane Guruvana Halli	Zone 2
11	Dodda Bidarakallu	Zone 1	67	Basaveshwara Nagara	Zone 2
12	Andrahalli	Zone 1	68	Kamakshipalya	Zone 2
13	Nada Prabhu Kempegowda Nagara	Zone 1	69	Agrahara Dasarahalli	Zone 2
14	Herohalli	Zone 1	70	Dr Rajkumar Ward	Zone 2
15	Byadarahalli	Zone 1	71	Thimmenahalli	Zone 2
16	Ullal	Zone 1	72	Kaveripura	Zone 2
17	Nagadevanahalli	Zone 1	73	Dr. Vishnuvardhan Ward	Zone 2
18	Kengal Hanumanthaiah West	Zone 1	74	Pattegar Palya	Zone 2
19	Shivanapalya	Zone 1	75	Marenahalli West	Zone 2
20	Kengeri Kote Ward	Zone 1	76	Moodalapalya	Zone 2
21	Kengeri	Zone 1	77	Maruthi Mandira Ward	Zone 2
22	Bangarappa Nagara	Zone 1	78	Anubhava Nagara	Zone 2
23	Rajarajeshwari Nagara	Zone 1	79	Nagarbhavi	Zone 2
24	Jnana Bharathi Ward	Zone 1	80	Chandra Layout	Zone 2
25	Vinayaka Layout	Zone 1	81	Nayanda Halli	Zone 2
26	Mallathahalli	Zone 1	82	Attigupe	Zone 2
27	Srigandada Kaval	Zone 1	83	Hampi Nagar	Zone 2
28	Kottegepalya	Zone 1	84	Hosahalli	Zone 2
29	Chowdeshwari Nagar	Zone 1	85	Adi Chunchanagiri Ward	Zone 2
30	Kempegowda Layout	Zone 1	86	Vidyaranyanagara	Zone 2
31	Freedom Fighter Ward	Zone 1	87	K.P Agrahara	Zone 2
32	Laggere	Zone 1	88	Sangolli Rayanna Ward	Zone 2
33	Lakshmi Devi Nagar	Zone 1	89	Bapuji Nagara	Zone 2
34	Peenya	Zone 1	90	Krishnadevaraya Ward	Zone 2
35	Goraguntepalya	Zone 1	91	Gali Anjaneya Temple Ward	Zone 2
36	Nalwadi Krishnaraja Wadiyar Ward	Zone 1	92	Muneshwara Block	Zone 2
37	Dr. Puneeth Rajkumar Ward	Zone 1	93	Avalahalli	Zone 2
38	Nandini Layout	Zone 1	94	Deepanjali Nagara	Zone 2
39	Jai Maruthi Nagar	Zone 1	95	Swamy Vivekananda Ward	Zone 2
40	Mahalakshmipuram	Zone 1	96	Kathriguppe	Zone 2
41	Nagapura	Zone 1	97	Srinivasa Nagara	Zone 2
42	Raja Mayura Varma Ward	Zone 1	98	Ashoka Nagara	Zone 2
43	Kethamaranahalli	Zone 1	99	T.R Shamanna Nagar	Zone 2
44	Shankar Mutt	Zone 1	100	Srinagar	Zone 2
45	Shakthi Ganapathi Nagara	Zone 1	101	Kempambudhi Ward	Zone 2
46	Kamalanagara	Zone 1	102	Hanumanthanagar	Zone 2
47	Vrishabhavathi Nagar	Zone 1	103	N.R Colony	Zone 2
48	Mathikere	Zone 2	104	Thyagarajnagar	Zone 2
49	Aramane Nagara	Zone 2	105	Yediyuru	Zone 1
50	Sadashiva Nagara	Zone 2	106	Devagiri Temple Ward	Zone 1
51	Rajamahal	Zone 2	107	Dharmagiri Ward	Zone 1
52	Kodandarampura	Zone 2	108	Ganesh Mandira Ward	Zone 1
53	Malleshwaram	Zone 2	109	Kamakya Layout	Zone 1
54	Subedarpalya	Zone 2	110	Chikkalasandra	Zone 1
55	Subramanyanagara	Zone 2	111	Ittamadu	Zone 1
56	Gayathri Nagara	Zone 2	112	Hosakerehalli	Zone 1

== Corporators ==
No Corporators have yet been elected to the BWCC; all 112 ward seats are vacant pending the 2026 elections. Once results are declared, this section will list, for each ward, the elected Corporator, their party, and their term of office.

== Premises ==
The BWCC is headquartered at the Dasarahalli Zonal Office in Dasarahalli, which served as a zonal office of the undivided BBMP before the corporation's constitution and was retained as the BWCC's seat under the transitional provisions of the Greater Bengaluru Governance Act, 2024.

== Emblem and motto ==
The BWCC uses an official logo (coa_pic in the infobox) rather than a heraldic coat of arms, consistent with Indian municipal corporations generally. Its adopted motto, "Kannada is our breath; Kannada is indeed, evergreen", reflects the corporation's use of Kannada-language civic branding, consistent with the naming conventions adopted by the Government of Karnataka for all five GBA corporations and their wards. The emblem was adopted concurrently with the corporation's formal constitution in September 2025.

== Functions and responsibilities ==
The BWCC's responsibilities under the Greater Bengaluru Governance Act, 2024 include obligatory functions such as property taxation, building regulation and zoning enforcement, public health and sanitation, solid waste management, maintenance of roads and stormwater drains, street lighting, parks and public spaces, urban forestry, and administration of markets and slaughterhouses. The BWCC also coordinates with the Bengaluru Water Supply and Sewerage Board on water supply and sewerage, and with the Bangalore Development Authority and other statutory bodies on land use and development matters.

The City Corporation Fund receives revenues from property tax, professional tax, advertisement charges, service fees, and state and central government grants. In cases where the BWCC cannot generate sufficient revenue for its obligatory functions, the state government provides grants-in-aid on the basis of recommendations from the Karnataka State Finance Commission.

== See also ==
- Greater Bengaluru Authority
- Bruhat Bengaluru Mahanagara Palike
- 2026 Greater Bengaluru Authority elections
- Bengaluru Central City Corporation
- Bengaluru North City Corporation
- Bengaluru South City Corporation
- Bengaluru East City Corporation
- Administrative divisions of Bengaluru
- List of mayors of Bengaluru
