= Vijaya bank layout =

Vijaya Bank Layout(Bilekahalli)
- Neighbourhood
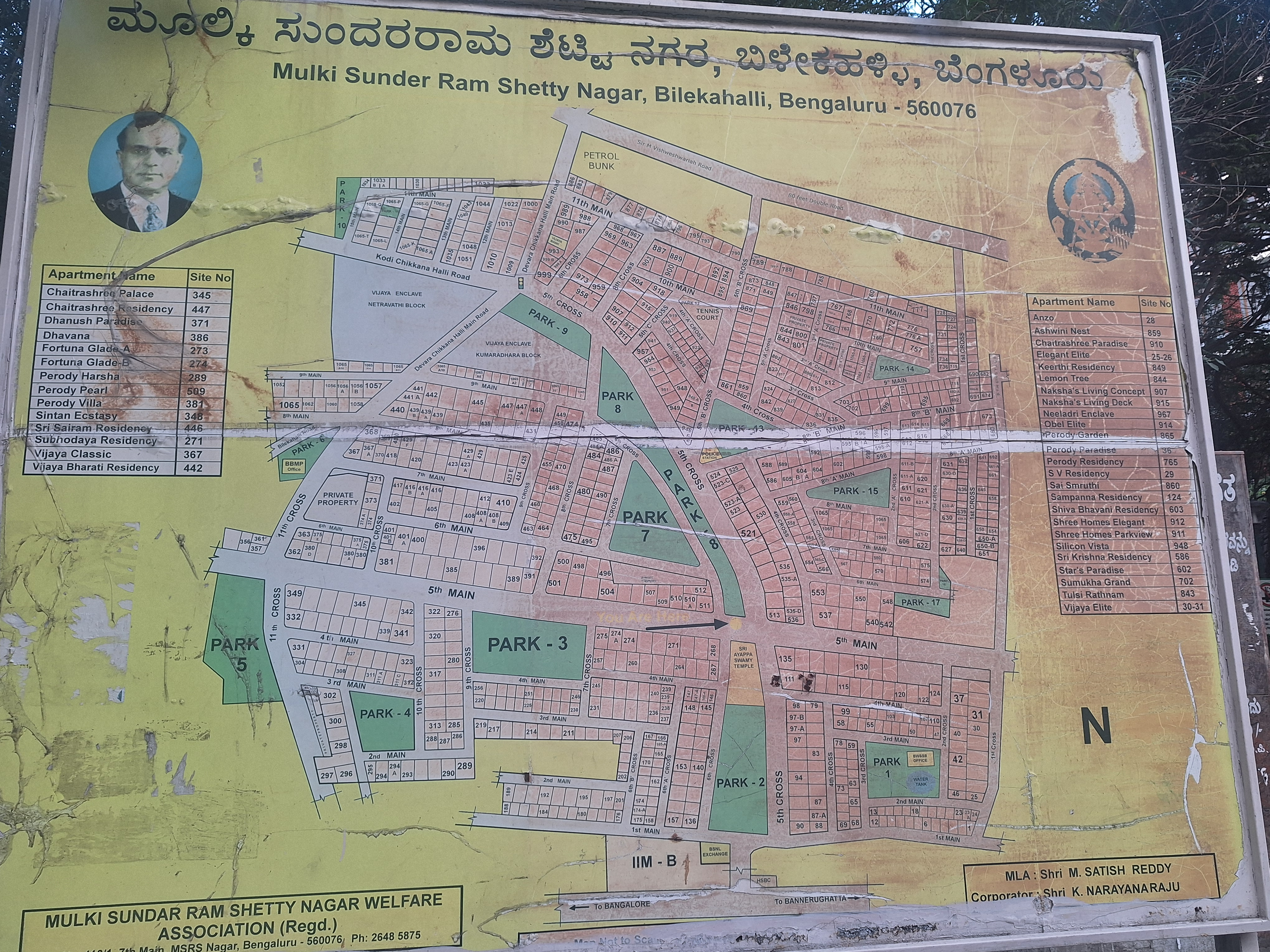
- Map of Vijaya bank Layout
- Nickname: Vijaya Bank layout
- Location of Vijaya Bank Layout
- Coordinates: 12.8902°N 77.6092°E
- Country: India
- State: Karnataka
- District: Bangalore Urban
- Metro: Bangalore
- Region: Bayaluseeme
- Division: Bangalore division
- Named for: Vijaya Bank

Government
  - Type: Municipal Corporation
  - Body: BSCC
- Elevation: 874 m (2,867 ft)

Population (2026)
  - Total: 27,787

Languages
  - Official: Kannada
- Time zone: UTC+5:30 (IST)
- PIN: 560076
- Vehicle registration: KA-51
- Lok Sabha constituency: Bangalore South
- Vidhan Sabha constituency: Bommanahalli

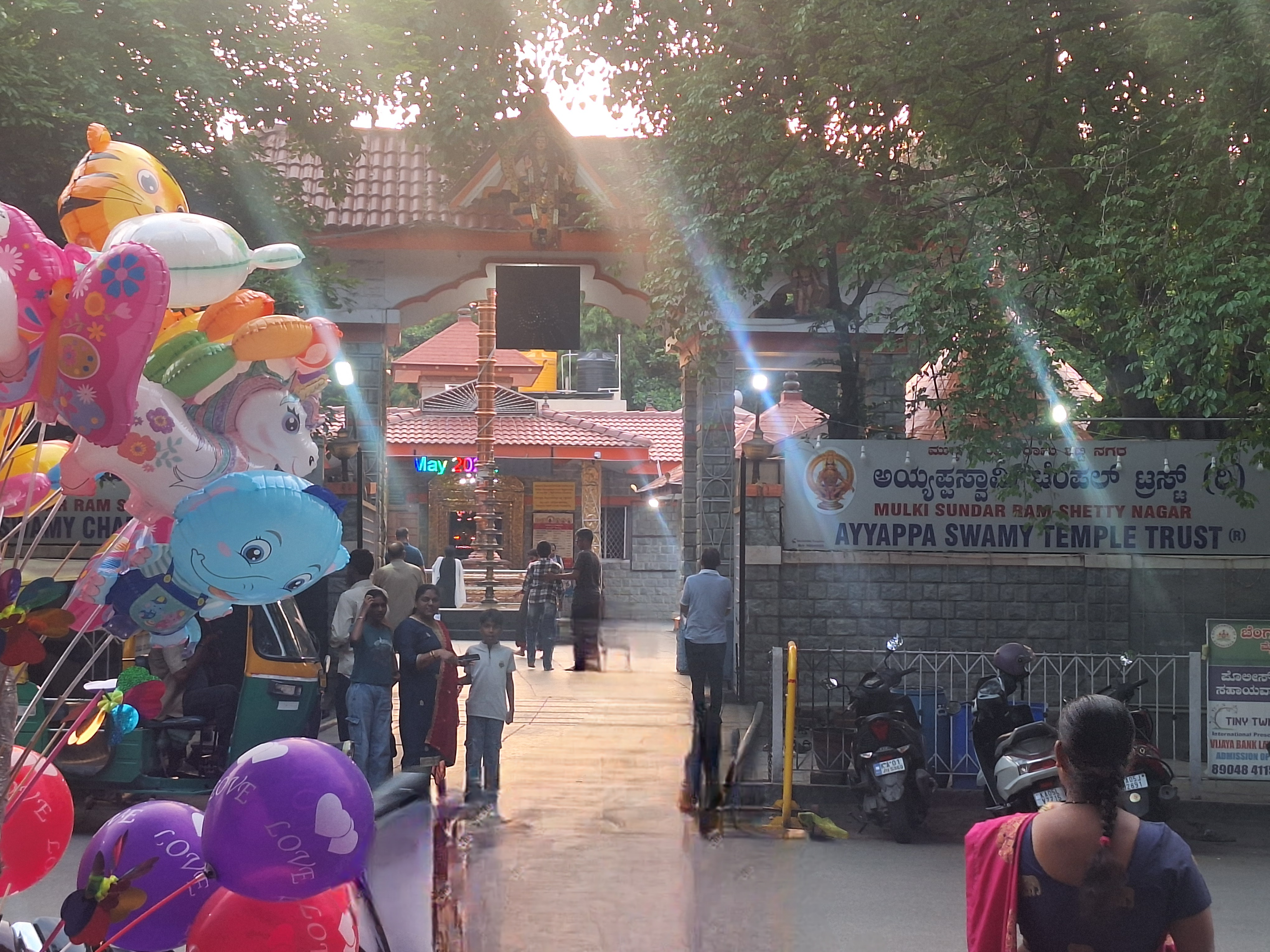
Ayyappa Swamy temple in Vijaya bank layout

Vijaya Bank layout or Mulki Sundaram Shetty Nagar is a suburb in Bangalore, India, situated in Bilekahalli off Bannerghatta Road. It is also known as BTM IV stage. It has gained prominence in recent times due to a boom in real estate and profusion of Information technology companies like HSBC. Several prominent hospitals as well as residential complexes have been set up in this area.

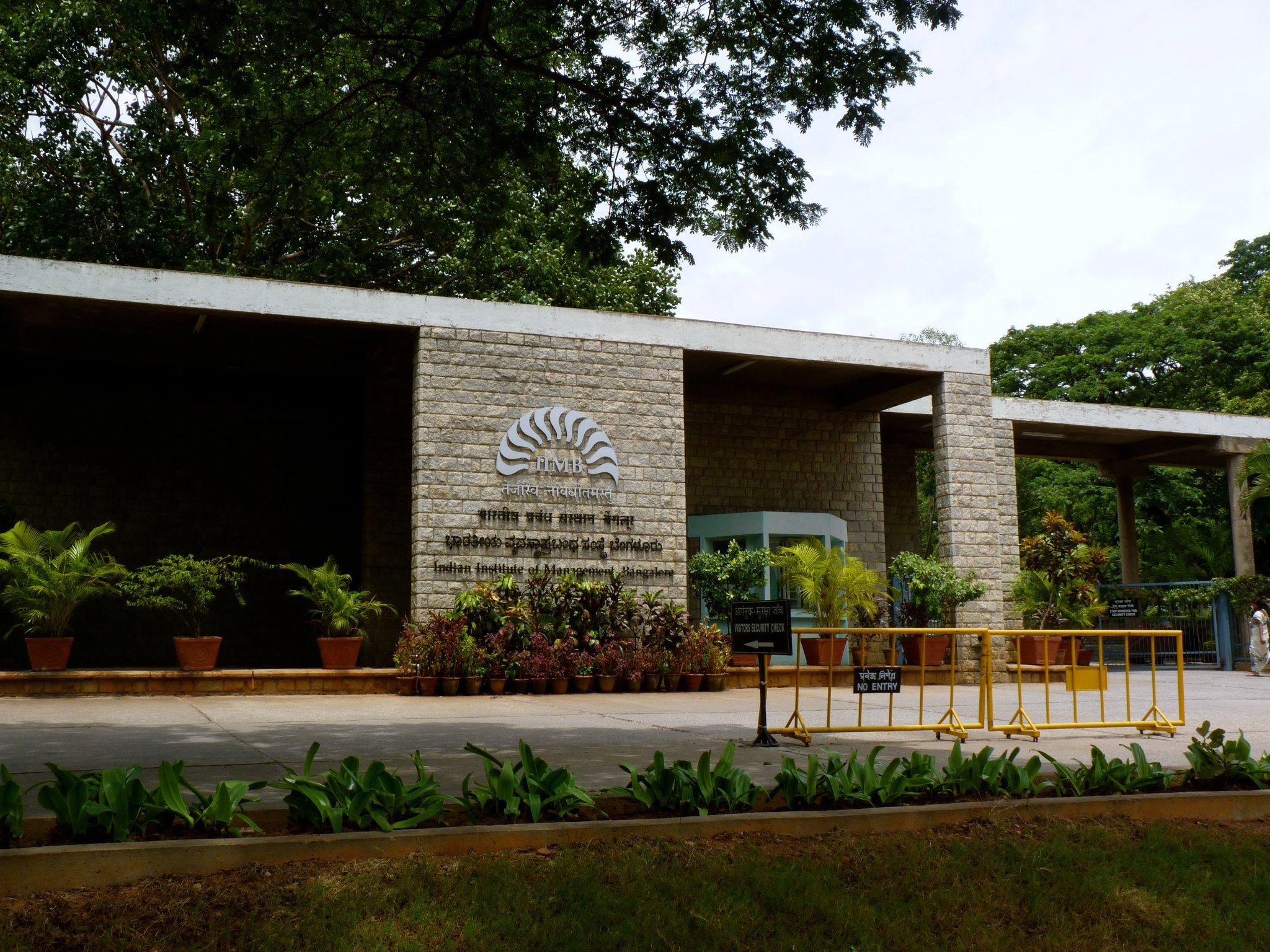
Main Entrance of IIMB campus

It is under the Bommanahalli Zone of BSCC.

Vijaya Bank Layout is also home to the Indian Institute of Management Bangalore, one of India's premier management institutes. It has many grounds and parks. There is a mico police outpost station near cafe coffee day. There is a cultural auditorium where many festivals are celebrated.

== Geography ==
It has an average elevation of 874 metres. It is in the Bayaluseeme region of Karnataka. Nearby tourist attractions include Bannerghatta National Park which is approximately 10 km away. Bannerghatta Butterfly Park which is located adjacent to the Bannerghatta National Park and is open on almost every day. The park is spread over an area of 7.5 acres with a butterfly trail of about a kilometer length. The ‘butterfly trail’ established over a five-acre garden leads the visitors to an innovatively designed three dome structure housing the conservatory, museum and the multi-media center Madiwala Lake which is home to rare bird species, is also famous in the neighborhood.

== Transport ==
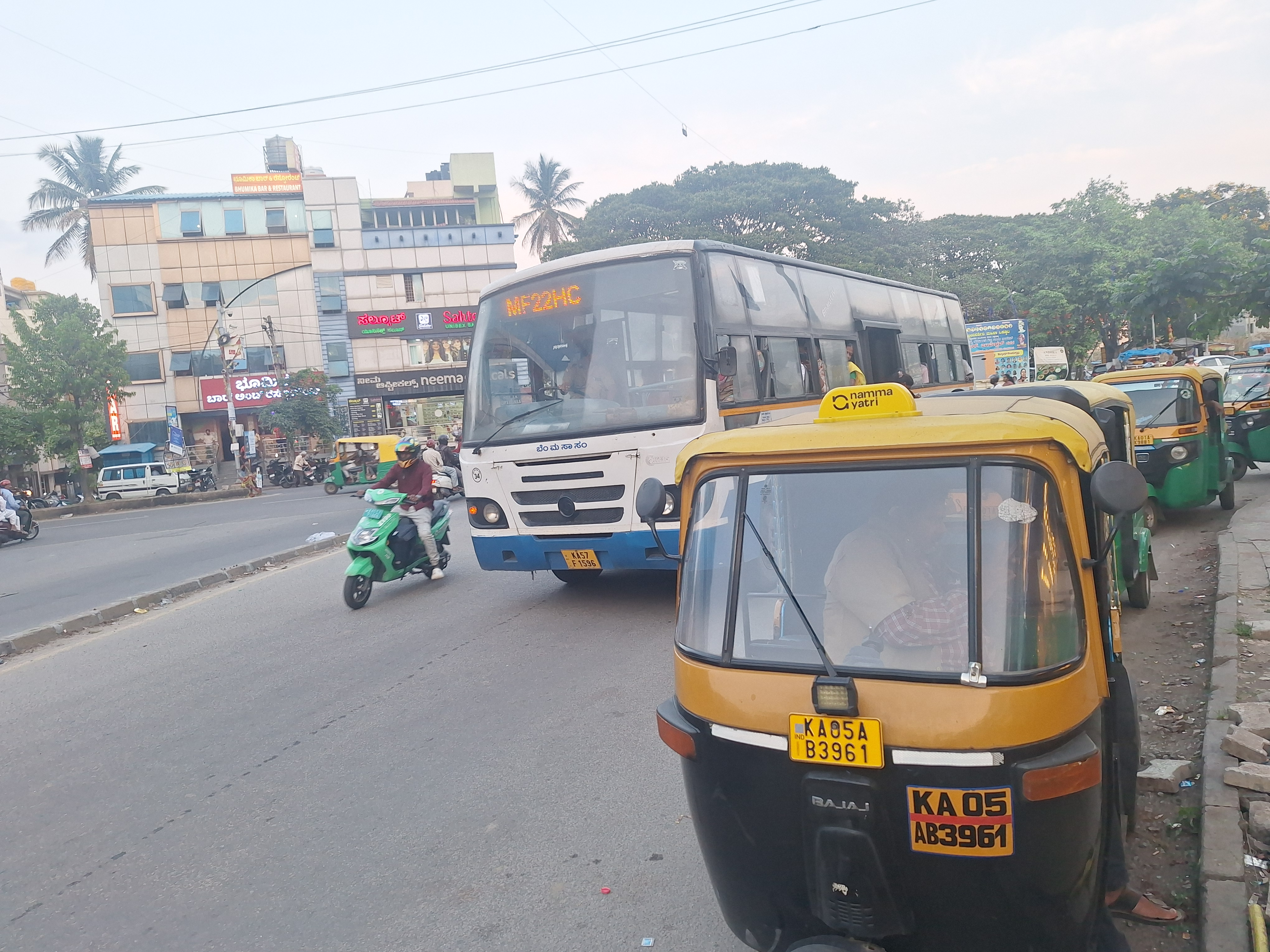
Midi MF-22HC bus in Vijaya bank layout departing towards Central Silk Board metro station

Vijaya bank layout is well connected to Bangalore by BMTC fleet buses. In this layout there are 3 bus stops. These three bus stops are connected by 366A (towards Kalasipalyam bus stop) which has frequency of 45 minutes-1 hour, 364 (B,C,G) towards Kempegowda Bus Station via Lalbagh. Apart from bus stop in Vijaya bank layout nearest Major bus stop is Bilekahalli bus stop (about l km from layout) which has connectivity to various part of Bangalore like Bannerghatta national park, Kempegowda Bus Station, kr market etc..In September 2025,New Midi bus service called as Metro Feeder service was launched from Hulimavu metro station to Central Silk Board metro station which passes through this layout. This bus service has frequency of 25 minutes.In september 2026 new bus service was launced passing through this layout.It is called as MF-14VJ.

Nearest metro to this layout (inaugurated on 13 November 2026) will be Bilekahalli IIM-B metro station which is 2 km away.

There are various intercity buses from this layout to cities like Mangalore,kundapura,karwar etc.KSRTC operates one non ac pallakki bus

sleeper bus service from Vijaya bank layout signal to Manipal.

The nearest airport for this layout is Kempegowda International Airport which is 46 km far. It is connected by State Highway 87 (Karnataka) also known as B.G. Road.

== See also ==
- Bilekahalli
- Bilekahalli IIM-B metro station
- Arekere
- Hulimavu
