= Bharathnagar =

- neighbourhood
- Location within Bengaluru
- Coordinates: 12.982°N 77.479°E
- Country: India
- State: Karnataka
- Metro: Bengaluru

Languages
  - Official: Kannada
- Time zone: UTC+5:30 (IST)
- PIN: 560091

Bharathnagar is a planned residential layout in the city of Bangalore, India. It is located off the arterial Magadi Road and approximately 13 km (8.1 mi) from the Bangalore Central Railway station. This layout was primarily created for the employees of the public sector Bharat Electronics Limited.

Bharathnagar is divided into Phase 1 & 2. Phase 2 is the larger of the two and has the capacity to accommodate 4000 independent homes. Phase 1 can accommodate 2,000 homes.

Bharathnagar was carved out of the larger village of Byadarahalli.

In December 2025, feeder buses were started from Jnana Bharathi Metro Station to Bharathnagar 2nd Stage.

Bharathnagar, which was till recently managed by the Residents Welfare Association, is now under the management of Bruhat Bengaluru Mahanagara Palike (BBMP). This has increased development activities in the region, with five new parks being established. Earlier, it was under Rammanahalli panchayat, which become a Town Panchayat in November 2020.

The tertiary educational college East West Group of Institutions is located within Bharathnagar Phase 1. The Confederation of Indian Industry - Institute of Quality (CII - IQ) building is located within Bharathnagar Phase 2. Karnataka Bank, Herohalli Branch, is located on 7th main road, Bharathnagar 2nd Phase.

== Schools and colleges ==
- East West Institute of Technology
- Euro Kids
