= Devarachikkanahalli =

- Neighbourhood
- Nickname: DC Halli
- Location in Bangalore, India
- Coordinates: 12.885°N 77.621°E
- Country: India
- State: Karnataka
- District: Bangalore Urban
- Metro: Bangalore

Languages
  - Official: Kannada
- Time zone: UTC+5:30 (IST)
- PIN: 560076
- Vehicle registration: KA51

Devarachikkanahalli, abbreviated as DC Halli, is a village in South Bangalore. It is a small locality which is located near Bannerghatta Road, little away from Bilekahalli. This village connects Bannerghatta Road with Begur.

The present MLA of Devarachikkanahlli is Sathish Reddy and the pin code of Devarachikkanahlli is 560076.

== Transport ==
The village is well connected by the Bangalore Metropolitan Transport Corporation.

- Route 366A connects Devarachikkanahalli with KR MARKET.
- Route 364B connects Devarachikkanahalli with Kempegowda Bus Station/Majestic.
- Route 368F connects Devarachikkanahalli with Shivajinagar

== Location ==
Devarachikkanahalli located near Bannerghatta road. Devarachikkanahalli comes under Ward 175.

== Non Government Organizations ==
"Way For Life" is a NGO present in Devarachikkanahalli, as a testament to the potential of youth-led initiatives. This NGO is more than simply a story; it is a collective narrative written by passionate individuals who have dedicated themselves to altering lives and communities. https://www.wayforlife.org/
