= Arekere Lake =

- Location within Bengaluru Location within India
- Location: Bangalore, India
- Coordinates: 12.882988°N 77.598108°E
- Type: lake
- Surface area: 25 acres (0.10 km^{2})
- Shore length^{1}: 3 kilometres (1.9 mi)
- ^{1} Shore length is not a well-defined measure.

Arekere Lake is situated in the Arekere - Hulimavu area of the city of Bangalore. Originally spread over an area of approximately 37 acres (0.15 km^{2}), the lake is bounded on the west by Bannerghatta Road, on the north by BDA Eighty Feet Road, on the east by Shantinikethan Layout and on the south by Hulimavu Main Road. According to the BBMP website, the perimeter of the lake is about 3 kilometres (1.9 mi). It was possibly a manmade water reservoir created approximately 100 years ago.

The lake is under the jurisdiction of the Bangalore Development Authority (BDA). As is the case with many other lakes in Bangalore, in the last two decades the Arekere Lake has been encroached upon by real estate developers, and the current extent of the lake has been estimated to be only approximately 25 acres (0.10 km^{2}). Also due to rapid urbanization of the rain catchment area of the lake and the consequent lack of seasonal water filling, by the end of the first decade of the 21st century the lake had nearly dried up. In October 2012 the lake was breached, and sewage water flowing out of the lake flooded the nearby residential areas. Following the floods, BDA prepared a detailed plan for the development of the lake at a cost of Rs.14 crore.

== Arekere Neighbourhood Improvement Trust (ANIT) ==
Concerned over the deteriorating quality of the lake, several residents in the area formed a collective called the Arekere Neighbourhood Improvement Trust (ANIT) with the express purpose of coordinating all efforts to rejuvenate the lake. The Trust was registered on 30 June 2012. The formation of the Trust was inspired by the success story of Puttenahalli Neighbourhood Lake Improvement Trust (PNLIT) formed in June 2010. The Trust has succeeded in creating awareness of the need for citizens' initiatives for saving the dying Arekere Lake. This was achieved by organizing several programs, including the formation of a human chain along the boundary of the lake.

In early 2015, BDA began work related to the development of Arekere Lake, along with 16 other lakes in Bangalore. The planned activities include de-silting, weeding, fencing, setting up counter bunds, inlets and outlets, construction of paths for walking around the lakes, and seats for walkers.

=== 2020 - 2022 ===
Between 2020 and 2022, civic authorities and local citizen groups actively worked toward reviving the lake through conservation initiatives, cleanup drives, and restoration projects. These efforts gradually improved the lake's condition, helping it retain water more effectively and support a growing variety of birds, plants, and aquatic life.

=== 2023 - 2024 ===
In 2023, the rejuvenation project gained further momentum, with approximately 6 acres of the 38-acre lake being restored. Financial support and community involvement helped accelerate the work, although legal disputes related to encroachments and land ownership continued to slow the overall progress. Despite these challenges, the lake showed visible improvements, becoming cleaner and more environmentally sustainable than in previous years.

During 2024, Arekere Lake remained part of Bengaluru's broader lake restoration and conservation strategy. Authorities focused on measures such as desilting, sewage diversion, wetland development, fencing, and ecological restoration to improve both water quality and biodiversity. These efforts were aimed at ensuring the long-term sustainability of the lake while reducing environmental degradation.

=== 2025 ===
By 2025, portions of the rejuvenated lake were opened to the public, transforming the area into a popular recreational space for local residents. Walking tracks and green surroundings attracted visitors, and the lake increasingly became an important urban green space within the neighborhood.
