= Bengaluru NavaNirmana Party =

Bengaluru NavaNIrmana Party ಬೆಂಗಳೂರು ನವನಿರ್ಮಾಣ ಪಕ್ಷ
- Abbreviation: BNP
- Founder: Srikanth Narasimhan
- Founded: 22 September 2019 (5 years ago)
- Ideology: Good Grassroots Governance
- Slogan: My City! My Pride! My Responsibility!

Website
- https://nammabnp.org/

The Bengaluru NavaNirmana Party or BNP (Kannada: ಬೆಂಗಳೂರು ನವನಿರ್ಮಾಣ ಪಕ್ಷ) is an Indian political party, formally launched on 22 September 2019. The party is only focused on the municipal elections in the Greater Bengaluru Area, primarily BBMP.

Founded by residents of Bengaluru, the members of the party include grassroots organizers who have worked in fields of solid waste management, animal welfare, water conservation, wastewater management, clean energy, roads, education, and healthcare.

The founder and general secretary of Bengaluru NavaNirmana Party is Srikanth Narasimhan, who is also the founder of Bangalore Apartment Federation (BAF).

== Ideology ==
BNP has no ambitions beyond Bengaluru, and none of its founders are politicians. The party states that it is not personality-driven.

BNP’s motto is “ನನ್ನ ನಗರ! ನನ್ನ ಹೆಮ್ಮೆ! ನನ್ನ ಜವಾಬ್ದಾರಿ!" (My City! My Pride! My Responsibility!)
