= Omashram =

Omashram is an old-age home located in Arekere. The old-age home was founded by Mohan Pai in 2001, who worked as an adviser for various government projects. After his retirement he decided to establish this home.
