= Bengaluru South City Corporation =

Local government of southern Bengaluru

Bengaluru South City Corporation Beṅgaḷūru Dakṣiṇa Nagara Pālike
- Emblem of Bengaluru South City Corporation

Type
- Type: Municipal Corporation

History
- Founded: 2 September 2025 (10 months ago)
- Preceded by: Bruhat Bengaluru Mahanagara Palike

Leadership
- Administrator / GBA Chief Commissioner (In absence of Mayor): Maheshwar Rao M., IAS
- Municipal Commissioner: Ramesh K.N., IAS
- Mayor: Vacant, since 2 September 2025
- Deputy Mayor: Vacant, since 2 September 2025
- Leader of the Opposition: Vacant, since 2 September 2025

Structure
- Seats: 72
- Political groups: No corporation council yet elected — all 72 seats vacant pending the 2026 elections

Elections
- Voting system: First-past-the-post
- Last election: New body — no prior election
- Next election: by December 2026

Motto
- Kannada is our breath; Kannada is indeed, evergreen

Meeting place
- Jayanagar Zonal Office, Jayanagar, Bengaluru, Karnataka

Website
- Bengaluru South City Corporation

Footnotes
- Governed by: Greater Bengaluru Governance Act, 2024 (Karnataka Act No. 36 of 2025)

The Bengaluru South City Corporation (BSCC) is one of the five municipal corporations constituted under the Greater Bengaluru Authority (GBA) to govern the city of Bengaluru, Karnataka, India. It covers the southern residential and industrial belt of the city, with its administrative headquarters at Jayanagar. The BSCC was formally constituted on 2 September 2025 by a notification of the Government of Karnataka under the Greater Bengaluru Governance Act, 2024, superseding the Bruhat Bengaluru Mahanagara Palike (BBMP) within its area.

The BSCC covers 147 km^{2} (57 sq mi) across 72 wards and encompasses well-established residential neighbourhoods and green-belt areas of southern Bengaluru, including Jayanagar, JP Nagar, BTM Layout, localities along Bannerghatta Road (including Vijaya Bank Layout, Arekere and Hulimavu), Bommanahalli, and HSR Layout. It has 17,44,611 registered voters across 1,614 polling stations. No corporation council has yet been elected; the Mayor, Deputy Mayor and all 72 Corporator seats remain vacant pending the 2026 elections, which the Supreme Court of India has directed be held by December 2026.

== History ==
Bengaluru's undivided civic administration was constituted in 1949 as the City of Bangalore Municipal Corporation, renamed the Bangalore City Corporation in 1951, then the Bangalore Mahanagara Palike in 1989, and the Bruhat Bengaluru Mahanagara Palike (BBMP) in 2006 following the annexation of surrounding city municipal councils, town municipal councils, and gram panchayats into an expanded Bengaluru. The BBMP, by then a single 198-ward corporation covering the whole city, was dissolved in 2025 and replaced by five independent City Corporations, of which the BSCC is one, coordinated by the newly created Greater Bengaluru Authority (GBA) as an apex body.

=== Greater Bengaluru Governance Act, 2024 ===
The Greater Bengaluru Governance Act, 2024 (Karnataka Act No. 36 of 2025) was enacted by the Karnataka Legislative Assembly and received the assent of the Governor of Karnataka on 23 April 2025, first published in the Karnataka Gazette Extra Ordinary on 24 April 2025. The Act dissolved the BBMP and established the Greater Bengaluru Authority as an apex coordinating body, under which five City Corporations were constituted to independently govern distinct geographic zones of Bengaluru.

=== Preliminary notification and public consultation ===
On 19 July 2025, the Government of Karnataka published Gazette Extra Ordinary No. 403 under notification No.UDD 170 BBS 2025(e), proposing the constitution of five City Corporations with specified boundaries and inviting objections and suggestions from affected persons within thirty days. Following consideration of objections and suggestions, the final notification constituting the corporations was issued on 2 September 2025 and signed by Nandakumar B., Under Secretary to Government, Urban Development Department (BBMP-2 and Coordination).

=== Ward delimitation ===
The Karnataka government conducted a fresh ward delimitation exercise in 2025, replacing the earlier BBMP ward structure. The BSCC was assigned 72 wards across a 147 km^{2} (57 sq mi) area, part of a wider 369-ward delimitation across all five corporations.

=== Constitution of the corporation ===
The BSCC came into existence on 2 September 2025 by gazette notification, formally superseding BBMP administration within its area and transferring assets, staff and liabilities to the new corporation under the transitional provisions of the Act.

== Boundaries ==
The boundaries of the BSCC were defined in Schedule-I of Gazette Extra Ordinary No. 522 (2 September 2025). The corporation is bounded on the north by the Bengaluru Central City Corporation, on the north-west and west by the Bengaluru West City Corporation, on the east by the Bengaluru East City Corporation, and on the south by areas under Bangalore Development Authority (BDA) jurisdiction.

Wards of the Bengaluru South City Corporation within the Greater Bengaluru Authority area

=== North boundary (with Bengaluru Central City Corporation) ===
The northern boundary starts at Madhavan Park and runs south-east along Mountain Road. It then traverses Bannerghatta Main Road, Hosur Main Road, Lalbagh Main Road, 80 Feet Road, Ejipura Main Road and Sarjapur Road, ending at Euphoria Cricket Ground near Koramangala.

=== West boundary (with Bengaluru West City Corporation) ===
The western boundary begins at Shri Honnappa Swamy Temple and runs north along the Bangalore-Mysore Expressway link road. It continues via Ittamadu Main Road, Kuvempu Road, Chikkalasandra Main Road, Kanakapura Main Road, and ends at Holla Breast Centre.

=== East boundary (with Bengaluru East City Corporation) ===
The eastern boundary starts at Neptune car zone and moves east to Bellandur tank, continuing south and west along Bellandur Outer Ring Road before ending at the Sarjapur Road junction with the Outer Ring Road.

=== South boundary (with BDA areas) ===
The southern boundary follows a path from St. Stephens Mar Thoma Church southward to the Bangalore-Mysore Expressway link road, tracing the GBA boundary via NH 48 (NICE Road), Kanakapura Main Road, NH 44, Sarjapur Road, and the Outer Ring Road.

== Governance ==
The BSCC provides municipal corporation services within its jurisdiction. Strategic functions across all five corporations — such as inter-zonal transport, drinking water bulk supply, and metropolitan planning — are coordinated by the Greater Bengaluru Authority. There is no elected corporation council as of the article's most recent update; administration is carried out by state-appointed officers pending the 2026 elections.

=== Legal and administrative status ===
Predecessor authority / status	Period
City of Bangalore Municipal Corporation	1949–1951
Bangalore City Corporation	1951–1989
Bangalore Mahanagara Palike	1989–2006
Bruhat Bengaluru Mahanagara Palike (undivided, 198 wards)	2006–2025
Constituted as an independent corporation; administered by state-appointed officers pending first election	2 September 2025–present

No corporation council has yet been elected, so there is no political control history to report.

=== Leadership ===
Political leadership of an elected corporation council is vested in the Mayor, assisted by a Deputy Mayor, both elected by the Corporators for a 30-month term. Since no corporation council has yet been elected, the Mayoralty and Deputy Mayoralty have remained vacant since the BSCC's constitution. In the interim, administrative leadership has been provided by state-appointed officers:

Officer	Role	From	To
Maheshwar Rao M., IAS	Administrator / GBA Chief Commissioner (in absence of Mayor)	2 Sept 2025	incumbent
Ramesh K.N., IAS	Municipal Commissioner	2 Sept 2025	incumbent

=== Composition ===
As the BSCC has not yet held a Corporation election, there are no elected political groupings to report. All offices are vacant pending the 2026 elections:

Office	Status
Mayor	Vacant
Deputy Mayor	Vacant
Leader of the Opposition	Vacant
Corporators (72 seats)	All vacant — 0 of 72 filled

The next election is due by December 2026, per Supreme Court direction; the deadline was extended from an earlier 31 August 2026 target because of the ongoing Special Intensive Revision of electoral rolls.

=== Mayor and Deputy Mayor ===
The Corporators elect one of their members as Mayor and another as Deputy Mayor at the first meeting of the newly constituted corporation. Both offices carry a term of 30 months (co-terminus with the first half of the five-year corporation council term), with fresh elections held at the mid-term for the remaining 30 months. A no-confidence motion against either officeholder may be moved only after six months from the commencement of their term; once defeated, another cannot be moved for the next six months. The offices are subject to reservation by rotation for Scheduled Castes, Scheduled Tribes, Other Backward Classes and women, as prescribed by the state government.

=== Commissioner ===
The Commissioner is appointed by the state government and serves as Chief Executive Officer of the Corporation. The Commissioner must be an officer not below the rank of Secretary to the Government and holds office for a term of two years, subject to the pleasure of the Government. The Commissioner supervises Joint Commissioners and other subordinate officers, implements resolutions of the City Corporation and the Standing Committees, and conducts official correspondence between the Corporation and the Government or other authorities. In the absence of an elected corporation council, the Corporation is administered by the Greater Bengaluru Authority Chief Commissioner acting jointly with the BSCC Commissioner.

=== Joint Commissioners (Zonal) ===
For administrative decentralisation, the BSCC is divided into zones, each headed by a Joint Commissioner appointed by the state government at a rank not below Deputy Secretary to Government or Karnataka Administrative Service (senior scale). The Joint Commissioner of each zone is the nodal authority for civic administration within that zone and coordinates Ward Committees and delegated functions.

=== Standing Committees ===
The Act establishes seven Standing Committees for the BSCC, each consisting of a minimum of nine and a maximum of fifteen Corporators (including a Chairman elected by committee members), with a term of 30 months. The Mayor and Deputy Mayor are ex-officio members of all Standing Committees:

1. Standing Committee for Administration, Education and Social Justice
2. Standing Committee for Revenue and Finance
3. Standing Committee for Public Works and Engineering
4. Standing Committee for Public Health and Disaster Management
5. Standing Committee for Forest, Environment, Ecology, Lakes, Horticulture and Fisheries
6. Standing Committee for Infrastructure
7. Standing Committee for Audit and Accounts

=== Assembly Constituency Level Consultative and Co-ordination Committee ===
For each Vidhan Sabha constituency falling within the BSCC, the state government constitutes an Assembly Constituency Level Consultative and Co-ordination Committee chaired by the local Member of the Legislative Assembly, with the Corporators of that area as members. This body meets at least once a month to coordinate with government agencies, monitor project implementation, and address public grievances.

=== Ward Committees and Ward Sabha ===
Each of the 72 wards has a Ward Committee of 15 members, chaired by the Corporator for that ward, with reserved seats for Scheduled Castes/Scheduled Tribes members, women, and registered Residents' Welfare Association representatives, plus Corporation nominees and members chosen by random draw of lots. Ward Committees have a term of 20 months. Each ward additionally has a Ward Sabha of all registered voters, which provides input to the Annual Ward Development Plan and meets at least quarterly.

== Elections ==
The BSCC has 72 wards, each electing one Corporator by first-past-the-post vote for a term co-terminus with the five-year corporation council.

=== 2026 elections ===
The 2026 Greater Bengaluru Authority elections will be the first elections held for all five corporations since the dissolution of the BBMP. The Supreme Court of India initially directed that polls be completed by 31 August 2026, rejecting a Karnataka government request for an extension to September 2026. The Court subsequently extended the deadline a further time, to December 2026, because of the ongoing Special Intensive Revision (SIR) of electoral rolls being carried out by the Election Commission across several states including Karnataka; the enumeration period was extended from 29 July to 8 August 2026, pushing back the publication of the final electoral rolls accordingly. Chief Minister D. K. Shivakumar said the state government would comply with the revised timeline and would not seek any further postponement, stating that all local body elections in the state — including Zilla Panchayat, Taluk Panchayat, Gram Panchayat and municipal corporation polls — would be completed by the end of 2026. All 72 wards of the BSCC are scheduled to go to the polls simultaneously, in what will be the corporation's first-ever direct election.

=== Previous: 2015 BBMP election ===
The predecessor election was the 2015 Bruhat Bengaluru Mahanagara Palike election, held on 22 August 2015 for the undivided 198-ward BBMP. The gap of more than eleven years between that election and the 2026 GBA polls represents an unprecedented discontinuity in Bengaluru's municipal electoral history, and means the BSCC — like its four sister corporations — begins its existence with no incumbents and no electoral precedent of its own.

== Wards ==
The BSCC comprises 72 wards across a 147 km^{2} (57 sq mi) area spanning the southern residential and industrial belt of Bengaluru, as notified by the Karnataka Government in November 2025. The wards are listed below grouped by the Karnataka Legislative Assembly constituency in which they fall, in the style used for parliamentary constituency groupings on comparable municipal council articles.

Padmanabanagar	Jayanagar	B.T.M Layout
1. Padmanabhanagara; 2. Kadirenahalli; 3. Yarab Nagar; 4. Banashankari Temple Ward; 5. Kane Muneshwara Ward; 6. Gowdanapalya	7. Byrasandra; 8. Tilak Nagara; 9. N.A.L Layout; 10. Abdul Kalam Nagar; 11. Jayanagar East; 12. Pattabhirama Nagara; 13. Marenahalli South; 14. J.P Nagar; 15. Shakambarinagara; 16. Sarakki	17. N.S Palya; 18. Viswamanava Kuvempu Ward; 19. New Tavarekere; 20. Madiwala; 21. Chikka Adugodi; 22. S.G Palya; 23. Lakkasandra; 24. Adugodi; 25. National Games Village; 26. Ejipura; 27. Sri Lakshmi Devi Ward; 28. Kormangala East; 29. Kormangala West; 30. Jakkasandra
Bangalore South	Bommanahalli	Single-ward constituencies
33. Naganathapura; 34. Chikkathoguru; 35. Vishwapriya Nagara; 36. Beguru; 37. Yelenahalli; 38. Doddakammanahalli; 39. Gottigere; 40. Anjanapura; 41. Kothanur; 42. RBI Layout; 43. Bheereshwara Nagar; 44. Harinagar; 45. Konanakunte; 46. Yelachenahalli; 47. Chandranagara; 48. Vasanthapura; 49. Uttarahalli; 50. Sarvabhouma Nagar; 51. Subramanyapura	53. Jaraganahalli; 54. Kengal Hanumanthaiah South; 55. Puttenahalli; 56. Doresanipalya; 57. Hulimavu; 58. Arakere; 59. Vijaya Bank Layout; 60. Bilekahalli; 61. Kodi Chikkanahalli; 62. Devarachikkanahalli; 63. Bommanahalli; 64. Hongasandra; 65. Garvebavi Palya; 66. Singasandra; 67. Bandepalya; 68. Mangammana Palya; 69. Hosapalya; 70. Iblur; 71. Agara; 72. HSR Layout	This corporation also contains one ward each from three constituencies whose bulk lies in other corporations or outside the GBA area: 31 – Kasavanahalli (Mahadevapura, chiefly in Bengaluru East City Corporation); 32 – Kudlu (Anekal, chiefly outside GBA jurisdiction); 52 – Talagattapura (Yeshwanthapura, chiefly in Bengaluru West City Corporation)

=== List of wards ===
Wards of the Bengaluru South City Corporation
Ward No.	Ward Name	Ward No.	Ward Name
1	Padmanabhanagara	37	Yelenahalli
2	Kadirenahalli	38	Doddakammanahalli
3	Yarab Nagar	39	Gottigere
4	Banashankari Temple Ward	40	Anjanapura
5	Kane Muneshwara Ward	41	Kothanur
6	Gowdanapalya	42	RBI Layout
7	Byrasandra	43	Bheereshwara Nagar
8	Tilak Nagara	44	Harinagar
9	N.A.L Layout	45	Konanakunte
10	Abdul Kalam Nagar	46	Yelachenahalli
11	Jayanagar East	47	Chandranagara
12	Pattabhirama Nagara	48	Vasanthapura
13	Marenahalli South	49	Uttarahalli
14	J.P Nagar	50	Sarvabhouma Nagar
15	Shakambarinagara	51	Subramanyapura
16	Sarakki	52	Talagattapura
17	N.S Palya	53	Jaraganahalli
18	Viswamanava Kuvempu Ward	54	Kengal Hanumanthaiah South
19	New Tavarekere	55	Puttenahalli
20	Madiwala	56	Doresanipalya
21	Chikka Adugodi	57	Hulimavu
22	S.G Palya	58	Arakere
23	Lakkasandra	59	Vijaya Bank Layout
24	Adugodi	60	Bilekahalli
25	National Games Village	61	Kodi Chikkanahalli
26	Ejipura	62	Devarachikkanahalli
27	Sri Lakshmi Devi Ward	63	Bommanahalli
28	Kormangala East	64	Hongasandra
29	Kormangala West	65	Garvebavi Palya
30	Jakkasandra	66	Singasandra
31	Kasavanahalli	67	Bandepalya
32	Kudlu	68	Mangammana Palya
33	Naganathapura	69	Hosapalya
34	Chikkathoguru	70	Iblur
35	Vishwapriya Nagara	71	Agara
36	Beguru	72	HSR Layout

== Corporators ==
No Corporators have yet been elected to the BSCC; all 72 ward seats are vacant pending the 2026 elections. Once results are declared, this section will list, for each ward, the elected Corporator, their party, and their term of office, in the format used for elected UK metropolitan borough councils.

Ward No.	Ward	Corporator	Party	Term of office
1	Padmanabhanagara	Vacant — pending 2026 election		
2	Kadirenahalli	Vacant — pending 2026 election		
3	Yarab Nagar	Vacant — pending 2026 election		
4	Banashankari Temple Ward	Vacant — pending 2026 election		
5	Kane Muneshwara Ward	Vacant — pending 2026 election		
6	Gowdanapalya	Vacant — pending 2026 election		
7	Byrasandra	Vacant — pending 2026 election		
8	Tilak Nagara	Vacant — pending 2026 election		
9	N.A.L Layout	Vacant — pending 2026 election		
10	Abdul Kalam Nagar	Vacant — pending 2026 election		
11	Jayanagar East	Vacant — pending 2026 election		
12	Pattabhirama Nagara	Vacant — pending 2026 election		
13	Marenahalli South	Vacant — pending 2026 election		
14	J.P Nagar	Vacant — pending 2026 election		
15	Shakambarinagara	Vacant — pending 2026 election		
16	Sarakki	Vacant — pending 2026 election		
17	N.S Palya	Vacant — pending 2026 election		
18	Viswamanava Kuvempu Ward	Vacant — pending 2026 election		
19	New Tavarekere	Vacant — pending 2026 election		
20	Madiwala	Vacant — pending 2026 election		
21	Chikka Adugodi	Vacant — pending 2026 election		
22	S.G Palya	Vacant — pending 2026 election		
23	Lakkasandra	Vacant — pending 2026 election		
24	Adugodi	Vacant — pending 2026 election		
25	National Games Village	Vacant — pending 2026 election		
26	Ejipura	Vacant — pending 2026 election		
27	Sri Lakshmi Devi Ward	Vacant — pending 2026 election		
28	Kormangala East	Vacant — pending 2026 election		
29	Kormangala West	Vacant — pending 2026 election		
30	Jakkasandra	Vacant — pending 2026 election		
31	Kasavanahalli	Vacant — pending 2026 election		
32	Kudlu	Vacant — pending 2026 election		
33	Naganathapura	Vacant — pending 2026 election		
34	Chikkathoguru	Vacant — pending 2026 election		
35	Vishwapriya Nagara	Vacant — pending 2026 election		
36	Beguru	Vacant — pending 2026 election		
37	Yelenahalli	Vacant — pending 2026 election		
38	Doddakammanahalli	Vacant — pending 2026 election		
39	Gottigere	Vacant — pending 2026 election		
40	Anjanapura	Vacant — pending 2026 election		
41	Kothanur	Vacant — pending 2026 election		
42	RBI Layout	Vacant — pending 2026 election		
43	Bheereshwara Nagar	Vacant — pending 2026 election		
44	Harinagar	Vacant — pending 2026 election		
45	Konanakunte	Vacant — pending 2026 election		
46	Yelachenahalli	Vacant — pending 2026 election		
47	Chandranagara	Vacant — pending 2026 election		
48	Vasanthapura	Vacant — pending 2026 election		
49	Uttarahalli	Vacant — pending 2026 election		
50	Sarvabhouma Nagar	Vacant — pending 2026 election		
51	Subramanyapura	Vacant — pending 2026 election		
52	Talagattapura	Vacant — pending 2026 election		
53	Jaraganahalli	Vacant — pending 2026 election		
54	Kengal Hanumanthaiah South	Vacant — pending 2026 election		
55	Puttenahalli	Vacant — pending 2026 election		
56	Doresanipalya	Vacant — pending 2026 election		
57	Hulimavu	Vacant — pending 2026 election		
58	Arakere	Vacant — pending 2026 election		
59	Vijaya Bank Layout	Vacant — pending 2026 election		
60	Bilekahalli	Vacant — pending 2026 election		
61	Kodi Chikkanahalli	Vacant — pending 2026 election		
62	Devarachikkanahalli	Vacant — pending 2026 election		
63	Bommanahalli	Vacant — pending 2026 election		
64	Hongasandra	Vacant — pending 2026 election		
65	Garvebavi Palya	Vacant — pending 2026 election		
66	Singasandra	Vacant — pending 2026 election		
67	Bandepalya	Vacant — pending 2026 election		
68	Mangammana Palya	Vacant — pending 2026 election		
69	Hosapalya	Vacant — pending 2026 election		
70	Iblur	Vacant — pending 2026 election		
71	Agara	Vacant — pending 2026 election		
72	HSR Layout	Vacant — pending 2026 election		

== Premises ==
The BSCC is headquartered at the Jayanagar Zonal Office in Jayanagar, which served as a zonal office of the undivided BBMP before the corporation's constitution and was retained as the BSCC's seat under the transitional provisions of the Greater Bengaluru Governance Act, 2024.

== Emblem and motto ==
The BSCC uses an official logo (coa_pic in the infobox) rather than a heraldic coat of arms, consistent with Indian municipal corporations generally. Its adopted motto, "Kannada is our breath; Kannada is indeed, evergreen", reflects the corporation's use of Kannada-language civic branding, consistent with the naming conventions adopted by the Government of Karnataka for all five GBA corporations and their wards. The emblem was adopted concurrently with the corporation's formal constitution in September 2025.

== Functions and responsibilities ==
The BSCC's responsibilities under the Greater Bengaluru Governance Act, 2024 include obligatory functions such as property taxation, building regulation and zoning enforcement, public health and sanitation, solid waste management, maintenance of roads and stormwater drains, street lighting, parks and public spaces, urban forestry, and administration of markets and slaughterhouses. The BSCC also coordinates with the Bengaluru Water Supply and Sewerage Board on water supply and sewerage, and with the Bangalore Development Authority and other statutory bodies on land use and development matters.

The City Corporation Fund receives revenues from property tax, professional tax, advertisement charges, service fees, and state and central government grants. Where the BSCC cannot generate sufficient revenue for its obligatory functions, the state government provides grants-in-aid on the recommendation of the Karnataka State Finance Commission.

== See also ==
- Greater Bengaluru Authority
- Bruhat Bengaluru Mahanagara Palike
- 2026 Greater Bengaluru Authority elections
- Bengaluru Central City Corporation
- Bengaluru North City Corporation
- Bengaluru East City Corporation
- Bengaluru West City Corporation
- Administrative divisions of Bengaluru
- List of mayors of Bengaluru
