= Bilekahalli =

- Neighbourhood
- Nickname: Bilekalli
- Location in Bangalore, India
- Coordinates: 12.898°N 77.605°E
- Country: India
- State: Karnataka
- District: Bangalore Urban
- Metro: Bangalore
- Elevation: 874 m (2,867 ft)

Languages
  - Official: Kannada
- Time zone: UTC+5:30 (IST)
- PIN: 560076
- Vehicle registration: KA-51
- Nearest city: Bengaluru
- Lok Sabha constituency: Bangalore South
- Vidhan Sabha constituency: Bommanahalli

Bilekahalli is a suburb in Bangalore, India, situated off Bannerghatta Road. It has gained prominence in recent times due to a boom in real estate and profusion of information technology companies. Several prominent hospitals as well as residential complexes have been set up in this area.

Bilekahalli is also home to the Indian Institute of Management Bangalore, one of India's premier management institutes.

== Hospitals in Bilekahalli ==
- Fortis Hospital (formerly Wockhardt Hospital)
- Apollo Hospital
- Parimala Hospital.
- Ashwini Hospital.
- Government Primary Health and Maternity Center (Arekere).
- Vivekanand Hospital (Dr Manikantan C.K.)
- Jeevottama Health Multi specialty Ayurveda Hospital (Dr Sharad Kulkarni)
- Rajashree Granthi Hospital (Dr Harish Babu and Shilpa Harish)
- Raibow Children's Hospital
- Shekhar Netralaya
- Narayana Netralaya
- Shreya Medical Center Hospital (BTS Layout)
- Nano Hospital
- Kshema diagnostic centre

== Transportation ==
Bilekahalli is well connected to Bangalore by BMTC old buses to various locality. some of the buses starting from devarchikkanahalli or vijaya bank layout used to stop at sri veerabhadra swamy bus stop which is also the main landmark but it has been closed as the road width is less except for morning buses to majestic or kr market . Many of the auto drivers stay in this area so getting auto during early morning and late night is not a problem. Very narrow roads.

== See also ==
- Vijaya bank layout
- Omashram
