= Dasarahalli =

Dasarahalli Dasarahalli Jalahalli Cross
- Suburb
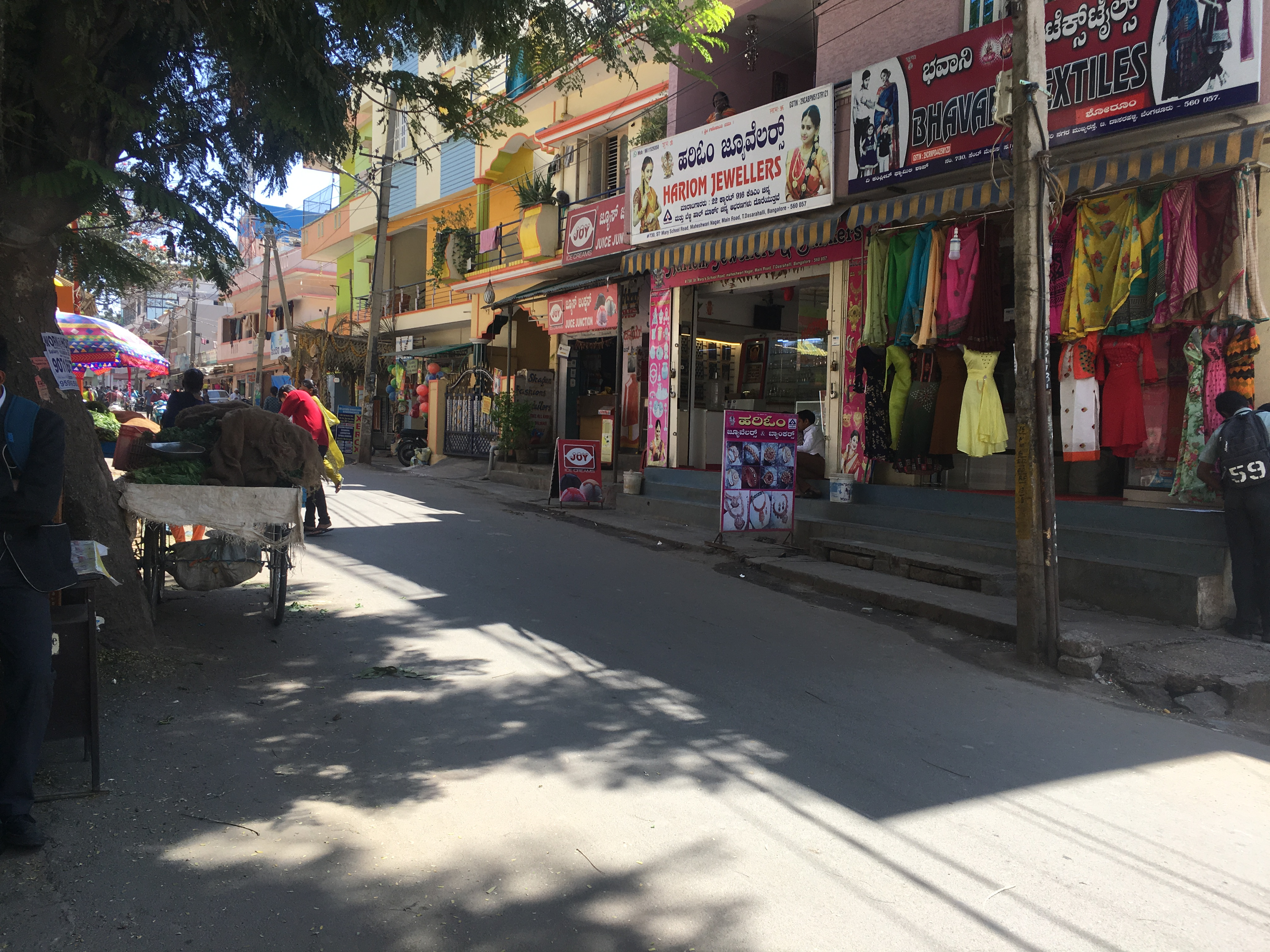

- Location within Bengaluru
- Coordinates: 13°05′55″N 77°50′20″E
- Country: India
- State: Karnataka
- District: Bengaluru Urban

Government
  - Type: Municipal Corporation
  - Body: Bruhat Bengaluru Mahanagara Palike

Population (2001)
  - Total: 263,636

Languages
  - Official: Kannada
- Time zone: UTC+5:30 (IST)
- PIN: 560057

Dasarahalli is a northwestern suburb of Bangalore in Bangalore Urban district in the state of Karnataka, India. The place is well known for its religious establishments such as Jalahalli Sree Ayyappan Temple, Shri Kari Maramma Devi Temple, Bagalgunte Maramma temple (100+ years old), Mallasandra Sri Prasanna Anjenya temple, Kaliyamma Temple, CSI Holy Cross Church, and St Dionysius Orthodox Church. Residential areas like Vaishnavi Rathnam, Casa Serene, Shantiniketan Apartments, Sobha ruby apartments, Ayyappa Nagar, Pipeline road, Grape Garden and Prashanth Nagar S.M road that includes the main Parayil Verghese family home. Police stations in the locality are Bagalgunte PS, Peenya PS and Gangammagudi PS. Nearby Hospitals are People tree Hospital, GJM Hospital, Prakriya Hospitals and Sree Ayyappan Temple Medical Center. Local administrative and digital services are provided by the NSDL PAN Center and a Common Service Centre (CSC). Schools in the place include the Standard English School. The locality also hosts recreational venues, such as Zoltrex Arena gaming hub.

== Education ==
Dasarahalli and its surrounding wards contain a mix of government and private educational institutions. Schools in the area are affiliated with the Karnataka State Board, the Central Board of Secondary Education (CBSE), and the Indian Certificate of Secondary Education (ICSE).

Notable schools in the locality include Widia Poornaprajna School, which has operated in the area since 1988 under the Udupi Shree Adamaru Matha Education Council. Standard Public School provides ICSE-affiliated education, while North Hills International School and Sri Ranga Vidyanikethan Central School offer CBSE curricula. St. Mary's Public School and Vijaya Bharathi School also serve the T. Dasarahalli area. The Government High School in T. Dasarahalli provides state-board secondary education to local residents.

For higher secondary education, the suburb has several pre-university (PU) colleges. Sri Ranga Pre-University College and Ascent PU College offer science and commerce streams for students transitioning from high school. G R V Business Management Academy is also located in the vicinity, offering degree and management courses.

== Landmarks and infrastructure ==
=== Transport ===
The locality is connected to the city's rapid transit network by the Dasarahalli metro station. This elevated stop is situated on the North-South corridor of the Green Line, linking the suburb to Madavara in the north and Silk Institute in the south. Commuters also rely on Tumkur Road (National Highway 4), which passes through the area and handles heavy traffic moving toward the adjacent Peenya Industrial Area.

=== Commercial and recreational spaces ===
Rockline Mall, located near Jalahalli Cross in Prashanth Nagar, serves as the primary shopping and entertainment center for the suburb. The complex includes retail outlets and a multiplex cinema. The mall premises also house Arcadia, an indoor gaming and amusement facility. Additionally, the area contains Zoltrex Arena, a local gaming hub.

=== Religious sites ===
The suburb has several religious structures, ranging from large temples to neighborhood shrines. The Bagalgunte Maramma temple is one of the older structures in the ward, dating back over a hundred years. Other local temples include the Sri Prasanna Shaneshwara Swamy Temple, the Sri Saundatti Yellamma Temple, and various shrines dedicated to Hanuman and Kaliyamma. The CSI Holy Cross Church and St. Dionysius Orthodox Church are the main Christian places of worship in the area.

== Demographics ==
As of 2001 India census, Dasarahalli had a population of 263,636. Males constitute 54% of the population and females 46%. Dasarahalli has an average literacy rate of 72%, higher than the national average of 59.5%: male literacy is 77% and, female literacy is 66%. In Dasarahalli, 12% of the population is under 6 years of age.

T Dasarahalli (Tumkur Road Dasarahalli) or Peenya Dasarahalli was a former City Municipal Council. But now it is officially merged to Bruhat Bangalore Mahanagara Palike. T Dasarahalli is also an Assembly Constituency after delimitation of Assembly constituencies. S Muniraju of Bharatiya Janata Party is now representing Dasarahalli constituency, R Manjunath (Janatadal) is opposition leader of this constituency who presently joined back to Congress at Loksabha election time 2024.

Dasarahalli is strategically located on National Highway 4. The zip code of T. Dasarahalli is 560057.
