= Bruhat Bengaluru Mahanagara Palike =

Former Administrative body for the city of Bengaluru

Bruhat Bengaluru Mahanagara Palike Br̥hat Beṅgaḷūru Mahānagara Pālike Greater Bengaluru City Corporation
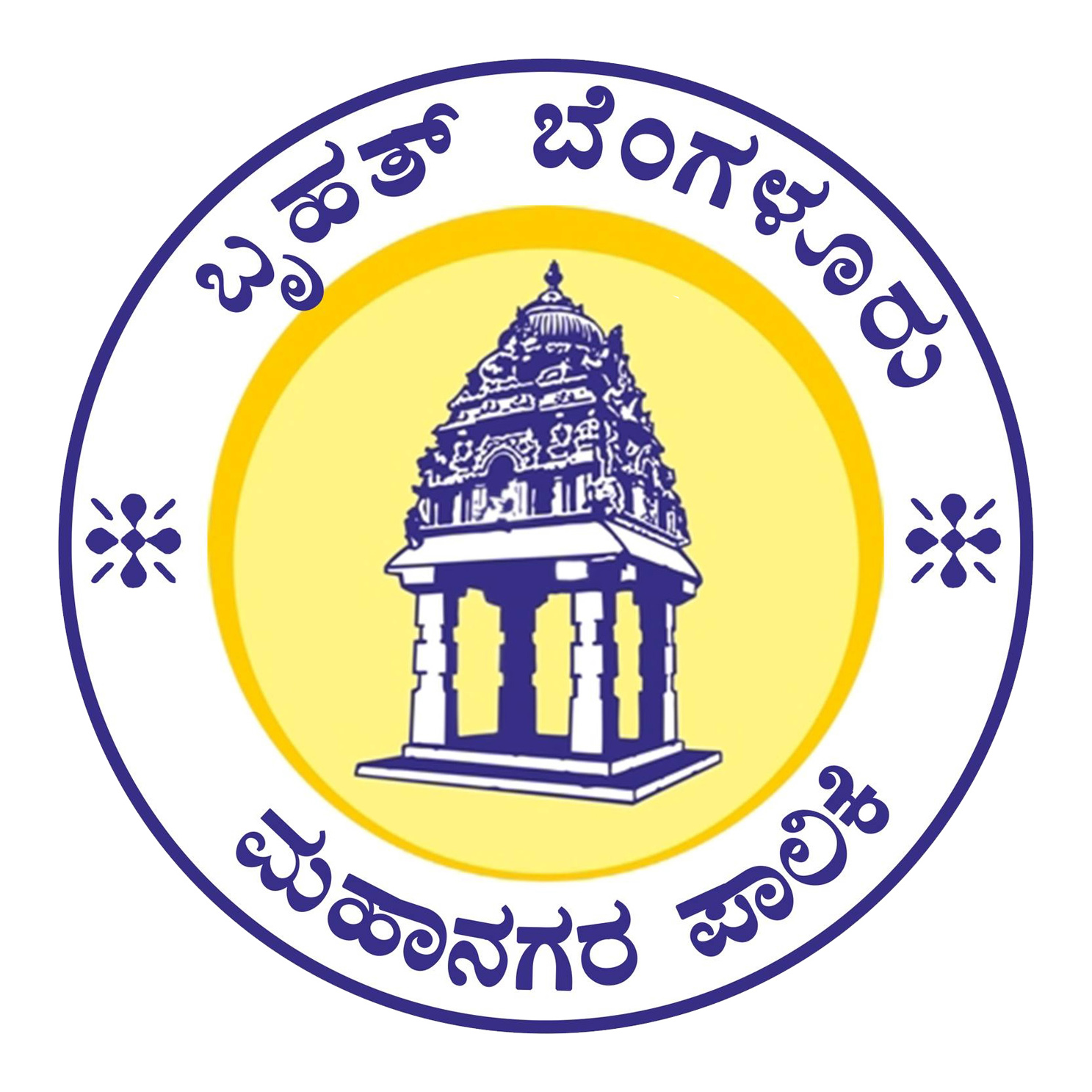
- Emblem of the Bruhat Bengaluru Mahanagara Palike

Type
- Type: Municipal Corporation

History
- Founded: 27 March 1862 (164 years ago) as Bangalore Municipality Board and Bangalore Cantonment Municipal Board; Legalised in 1881 as Bangalore City Municipality and Bangalore Civil and Municipal Station Municipality; Merged in 1949 to form Corporation of the City of Bangalore; Renamed in 1950 to Bangalore City Municipal Corporation; Renamed in 1989 to Bangalore Mahanagara Palike; Renamed in 2007 to Bruhat Bengaluru Mahanagara Palike
- Disbanded: 15 May 2025; 18 months ago (Establishment of Greater Bengaluru Authority and start of power transfer); 2 September 2025; 14 months ago (Ceased to exist)
- Preceded by: Bangalore Mahanagara Palike (2007)
- Succeeded by: Apex Body: Greater Bengaluru Authority (2025): Bengaluru Central City Corporation; Bengaluru North City Corporation; Bengaluru South City Corporation; Bengaluru East City Corporation; Bengaluru West City Corporation

Leadership
- Administrator (In Absence of Mayor): S. R. Umashankar, IAS
- Municipal Commissioner: Maheshwar Rao M., IAS
- Mayor: Vacant, since 10 September 2020
- Deputy Mayor: Vacant, since 10 September 2020
- Leader of the Opposition: Vacant, since 10 September 2020
- Seats: 243

Elections
- Voting system: First-past-the-post
- Last election: 2015
- Next election: (Ceases to exist)

Motto
- Kannada is our breath; Kannada is indeed, evergreen

Meeting place
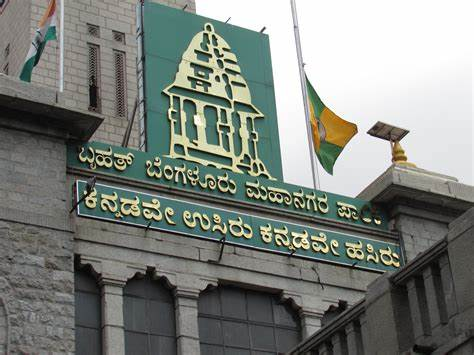
- Kempegowda Civic Hall, Hudson Circle (Corporation Circle), Bengaluru, Karnataka, 560002

Website
- BBMP

Footnotes
- Governed by: Bruhat Bengaluru Mahanagara Palike Act, 2020

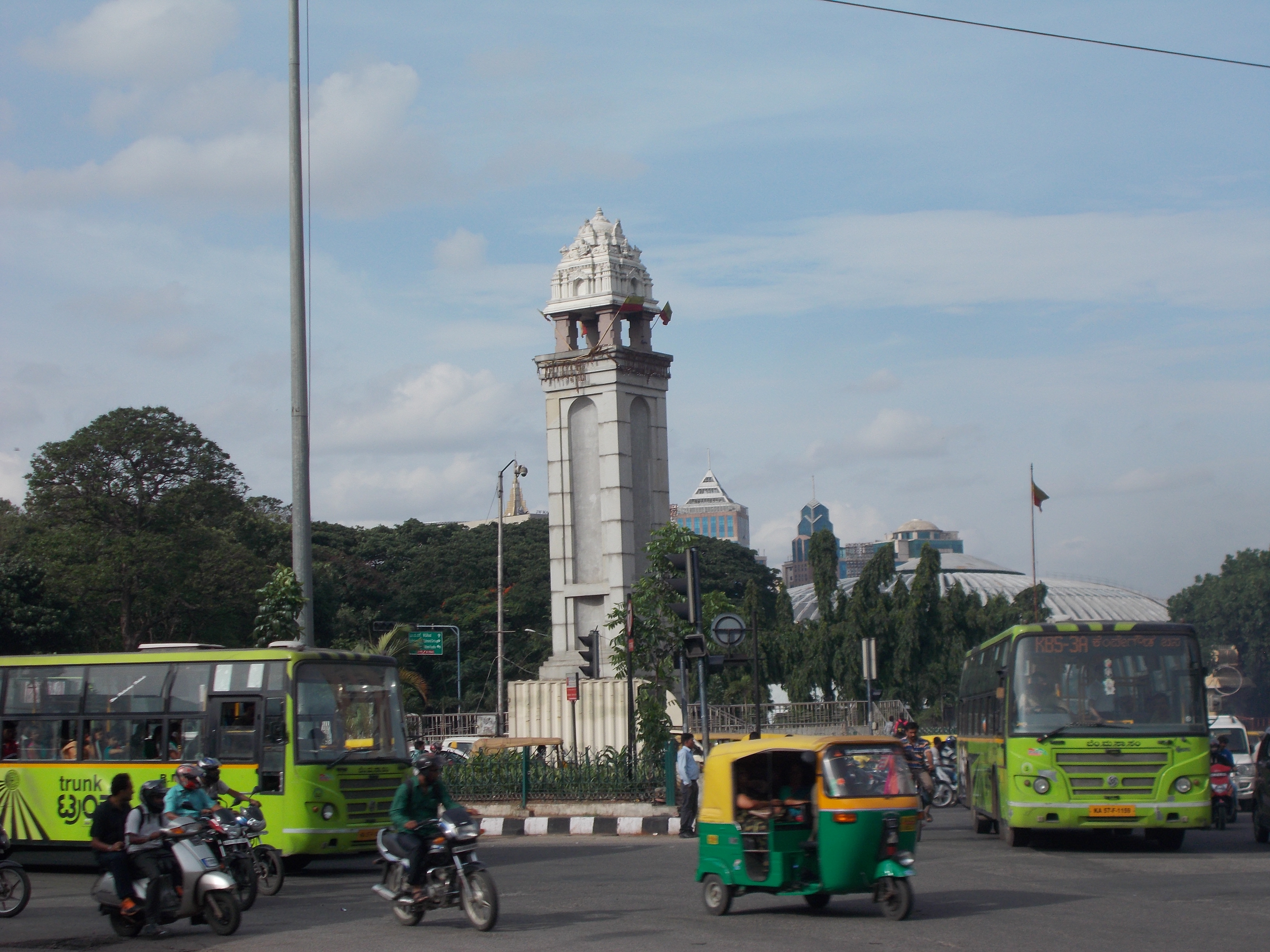
BBMP Tower near Corporation Circle, Bangalore

Bruhat Bengaluru Mahanagara Palike (BBMP) pronounced [ˈbɾ͜ɯhɐt̪ bengɐˈɭuːru mɐˈhɑːnɐgɐɾɐ 'pɑːlike] was the municipal body responsible for maintaining civic amenities and some infrastructural assets of Greater Bengaluru. It was the fourth largest Municipal Corporation in India and was responsible for a population of 8.4 million in an area of 712 km^{2}. The boundaries of the corporation were expanded more than 10 times since the 1950s. From September 2025 it was replaced by five independent city corporations - Bengaluru Central City Corporation, Bengaluru North City Corporation, Bengaluru South City Corporation, Bengaluru East City Corporation and Bengaluru West City Corporation under an apex body for coordination between the new municipal bodies & other parastatal bodies/statutory authorities called the Greater Bengaluru Authority.

Its roles and responsibilities included zoning and building regulations, health, hygiene, licensing, trade and education, as well as quality of life issues such as public open space, water bodies, parks and greenery.

The BBMP represented the third level of government (the Central Government and State Government being the first two levels). BBMP was run by a unelected IAS officer selected by state government during its last stages when city council composed of elected representatives, called "corporators" was suspended indefinitely, one from each of the wards (localities) of the city. A range of other statutory authorities exercise certain municipal responsibilities (eg: the Bangalore Development Authority, and BESCOM).

The elections to the council were held once every five years, with results being decided by popular vote. The members contesting elections to the council represented one or more of the state's political parties.

== History ==
The history of municipal governance of Bangalore dates back to 27 March 1862, when nine leading citizens of the old city formed a Municipal Board under the Improvement of Towns Act of 1850, with a similar Municipal Board formed for the newer Cantonment area. A fuller account gives the Bangalore town Municipal Committee as constituted in May 1862 with ten members (two European officials, four Indian officials and four non-official Indians) and an annual fund of Rs. 21,681, under the presidency of the Assistant Superintendent of Bangalore Division, for a town of 36,302 people; the Cantonment's own seven-member Municipal Committee followed on 1 August 1862 under the Superintendent of Police, with a fund of Rs. 37,509 for a population of 57,193. Bangalore town then covered about 8¼ square miles and the Cantonment about 12½ square miles.

The town municipality initially comprised three divisions (Balepet, Manavarthpet and Alsoorpet, each with two councillors); Nagarathpet and Kalasipalyam were added in 1878, High Grounds in 1883, and Lalbagh and Palace in 1891 (the latter two merging in 1893), with Malleshwaram and Basavanagudi following in 1903 to bring the total to nine divisions. The Cantonment municipality had six divisions: Ulsoor (Halsur), Southern, East General Bazaar, West General Bazaar, Cleveland Town, and High Ground. The Municipal Regulation Act of 1871 placed both municipalities under a single executive officer, Dr. J. H. Orr, though each retained its own establishment and funds, with joint measures decided by the two bodies assembling together and voting by majority.

Following the 1881 Rendition, when direct British rule in Mysore ended and administration reverted to the Maharaja, Dr. Orr handed charge of the town municipality to L. Ricketts, Deputy Commissioner of Bangalore district; the town board continued under the 1871 Regulation as amended in 1883, with property tax among the measures introduced and Arcot Srinivasachar appointed its honorary Vice-President. The Cantonment received its own law, the Bangalore Municipal Regulation Act of 1883, which gave its taxpayers the right to elect councillors for the first time, with communal representation (six European/Eurasian, four Muslim and eight Hindu seats, eighteen in total); the town municipality's taxpayers gained the equivalent right only in 1892, when half of its 22 members became elected (the rest remaining government-nominated), without communal representation.

A new Municipal law for the Cantonment, enacted in 1897, provided for a council of a President and 25 other councillors, with the District Magistrate serving as President by default; of the 25, seven were appointed by the Resident, one elected by the Bangalore Traders' Association, and seventeen elected from the divisions, again on a communal basis. In the town municipality, the Deputy Commissioner of Bangalore division officiated as President until T. T. Leonard was appointed its first full-time President in 1896, abolishing the Vice-President post; following a plague outbreak in 1898 the Deputy Commissioner briefly resumed the presidency before K. P. Puttanna Chetty succeeded Leonard. Citing poor maintenance of roads and drains and disorganised records, the Mysore government appointed A. S. Nagarkar, a retired superintending engineer, as the town municipality's President in 1904.

Under the influence of the Indian independence movement, the town municipal council periodically passed resolutions against the sale of arrack and in favour of khadi, and staged walkouts protesting the arrest of Indian National Congress leaders — adjourning, for instance, on 4 February 1928 over the landing of the Simon Commission, and again on 7 August 1930 over the arrest of Vallabhbhai Patel, Madan Mohan Malaviya and others; the state government objected to these resolutions as an improper import of British Indian politics into municipal affairs.

After Indian independence, the City of Bangalore Corporation Act (Act LXIX of 1949) constituted the Bangalore city and Civil & Military (C&M) Station areas into a single Corporation for municipal administration, comprising 50 divisions — 31 wards from Bangalore town and 19 from the Cantonment area. The new Municipal Corporation of Bangalore City was inaugurated on 8 December 1949 by the then Chief Minister of Mysore, K. C. Reddy. Before the merger, the City Municipality had made relatively greater progress in underground drainage and street lighting, while the Cantonment Municipality was ahead in housing schemes and welfare centres; the corporation covered an area of about 30 square miles with a 62-member council (one source gives the 1951 figure as 26.7 square miles, with a population of 778,977 at the 1951 census), and, for the first time, the office of Mayor; R. Subbanna served as the corporation's first Mayor. Water supply was initially run by the state Public Works Department and then by the corporation itself from 1961, until the state government transferred the function to the newly created Bangalore Water Supply and Sewerage Board in October 1964. The first elections to the corporation were held in 1950, after which N. Keshava Iyengar took office as the corporation's first elected Mayor.

=== Mayors, 1949–1989 ===
The Karnataka State Election Commission's own list of Bengaluru mayors records the following names and years for this period, all drawn from the Indian National Congress until 1983 and from the Janata Party thereafter:

Mayors of the Corporation of the City of Bangalore / Bangalore City Corporation / Bangalore Mahanagara Palike / BBMP, 1949–2020
#	Mayor	Year(s)
1	R. Subbanna	1949
2	N. Keshava Iyengar	1950
3	R. Anantharaman	1951
4	B. V. Lankappa	1952
5	V. Hanumanthaiah	1953
6	H. S. Seetharam	1954
7	V. P. Deendayal Naidu	1955
8	M. Krishnappa	1956
9	Jeena Bai Devidas	1957
10	Y. Ramachandra	1958
11	N. Narayana Chetty	1959
12	B. Indiramma	1960
13	B. Nanjappa	1961
14	V. S. Krishna Iyer	1962
15	K. M. Nanjappa	1963
16	G. Narayana	1964
17	K. M. Naganna	1965
18	T. K. Thimmaraya Gowda	1966
19	J. Lingaiah	1971
20	M. V. Tiwari	1972
21	M. K. Ananthakrishna	1973
22	T. D. Naganna	1974
23	S. Sundar Raj	1983
24	L. Subbaraj	1984
25	B. K. M. Gowda	1985
26	B. V. Puttegowda	1986
27	Dr. M. J. Sheshadri	1987
28	Lawrence V. Fernandes	1988
29	K. C. Vijay Kumar	28 May 1990 – 29 June 1991
30	K. Narayana Swamy	19 June 1991 – 29 June 1992
31	Lakkanna	29 June 1992 – 28 June 1993
32	B. S. Sudanva	28 June 1993 – 27 June 1994
33	G. Kuppaswamy	27 June 1994 – 27 June 1995
34	Padmavathi Gangadhar Gowda	25 November 1996 – 29 November 1997
35	J. Huchappa	29 November 1997 – 30 November 1998
36	K. H. N. Simha	30 November 1998 – 29 November 1999
37	M. Ramachandrappa	29 November 1999 – 29 November 2000
38	Prema Cariappa	29 November 2000 – 23 November 2001
39	K. Chandrashekhar	24 November 2001 – 30 November 2002
40	C. M. Nagaraj	30 November 2002 – 28 November 2003
41	P. R. Ramesh	28 November 2003 – 29 November 2004
42	R. Narayana Swamy	29 November 2004 – 29 November 2005
43	Mumtaz Begum	29 November 2005 – 23 November 2006
44	S. K. Nataraja	23 April 2010 – 28 April 2011
45	Sharadamma	29 April 2011 – 26 April 2012
46	D. Venkatesh Murthy	26 April 2012 – 3 September 2013
47	B. S. Satyanarayana	4 September 2013 – 5 September 2014
48	N. Shanthakumari	5 September 2014 – 18 April 2015
49	B. N. Manjunath Reddy	11 September 2015 – 28 September 2016
50	G. Padmavathi	28 September 2016 – 28 September 2017
51	R. Sampath Raj	28 September 2017 – 28 September 2018
52	Gangambike Mallikarjun	28 September 2018 – 1 October 2019
53	M. Goutham Kumar	1 October 2019 – 10 September 2020

Rows 29–50 are drawn from the Election Commission's dataset; rows 51–53, which post-date that dataset's last recorded entry, are independently sourced to contemporaneous press coverage of each handover. M. Goutham Kumar was the last elected Mayor of the BBMP; no successor was elected before the council's own term expired on 10 September 2020, after which the corporation was run by a state-appointed Administrator for the rest of its existence.

The record above shows gaps with no mayor listed for 1967–1970, 1975–1982, and 1995–1996 — periods resembling the Administrator's-rule pattern seen after 2006 and again after 2020, but whose specific cause has not been independently confirmed here despite extensive search.

The name of the council changed — first to Bangalore City Corporation (BCC) and then to Bengaluru Mahanagara Palike (BMP) in the year 1989. For the body's full list of Mayors through 2020, see the table above.

In 1989, the BMP expanded to include 87 wards and further increased to 100 wards in 1995, covering an extra area of 75 sq. km. The council also included 40 additional members drawn from the parliament and the state legislature.

Around the same time, the BMP council passed a resolution that only BDA layouts should be included in its limits and not revenue pockets, because of the cost of developing the latter. Around 50 per cent of the expanded BMP areas (meaning at least 40 wards among 100) were revenue pockets at that time. At that time, the BMP proposed betterment charges of Rs.215/sq. yard based on costs of developing those areas. But after the BMP elections of 1996, the council took a decision to reduce betterment charges to Rs.100/sq. yard. The state government (the H. D. Deve Gowda led administration) then issued a notice to the city council demanding why the latter reduced the rates. Subsequently, the state government agreed to the BMP rates.

The BMP Council's five-year term ended on 23 November 2006, after which senior bureaucrat Dilip Rau was appointed Administrator; no election was held to replace the outgoing council, leading to what commentators later called the longest period Bengaluru had gone without an elected municipal council up to that time. In January 2007, the Karnataka Government issued a notification to merge 100 wards of the erstwhile Bengaluru Mahanagara Palike with seven City Municipal Councils (CMC)s, one Town Municipal Council (TMC) and 110 villages around the city to form a single administrative area (111 villages mentioned in initial Notification. Later 2 villages omitted from the list and another village added before final Notification). The process was completed by April 2007 and the body was renamed 'Bruhat Bengaluru Mahanagara Palike (Greater Bangalore Municipal Corporation).

The first elections to the newly created BBMP body were held on 28 March 2010, after repeated delays caused by changes to ward delimitation (the ward count was revised from 100 to 145 in 2008 and then to 198 in mid-2009), incomplete reservation of seats, and disputes over the draft voter lists, several of which required Karnataka High Court intervention — at one point the Court called the state government's justifications for delay "flimsy, frivolous and lame" — before a final election calendar was set. S. K. Nataraj was chosen as the first Mayor of the newly constituted body.

The second elections were held on 22 August 2015 with the BJP winning the majority with 101 Corporators (Congress won 76, Janatha Dal S 14 and Independents 7). The results were declared on 25 August 2015. With none of the parties touching the required number, the Congress and JDS with the help of independents won the mayor election. The BJP with the majority number of corporators in the BBMP council was forced to sit in the Opposition. On 11 September 2015, B. N. Manjunath Reddy of the INC was elected Mayor and S. P. Hemalatha of the JD(S) was elected Deputy Mayor; Padmanabha Reddy of the BJP was reported as the Leader of the Opposition.

This elected council's five-year term expired in September 2020. No fresh elections were held after that date; the BBMP instead continued under a state-appointed Administrator and Commissioner for the remainder of its existence, until it ceased to exist in September 2025.

In 2015 the INC passed a legislation in the state parliament requiring the abolition of the BBMP, and its reconstitution as multiple, separate municipal bodies. The government's rationale, as stated in the bill itself, was that the population of Bangalore was too large for a single corporation to administer. The bill recommended that the BBMP be split into three separate municipal corporations ("trifurcation"), but stated the actual number was to be specified by government notification at a later date. The bill was strongly opposed by the opposition in the state parliament and a majority of the BBMP councillors. It was also debated in the media. Commentators noted that the bill takes place against the failure of municipal trifurcation in Delhi three years earlier.

In July 2016, the Union Government's Ministry of Home Affairs raised 13 objections to the bill, and sent a request for further explanation to the Karnataka Government, in particular raising the point that an elected body cannot be dissolved before its term ends, leaving the BBMP intact until at least 2019. It also advised Karnataka to study the consequences of the Delhi trifurcation as it may relate to Bangalore. After holding off on implementing the split for several years, in October 2017, Karnataka Chief Minister Siddaramaiah reaffirmed his objective of carrying out the trifurcation.

The Karnataka Legislative Assembly passed the Karnataka Municipal Corporation (Amendment) Bill to increase the number of civic wards in Bengaluru to 250. On 6 October 2020 a legislative select committee led by BJP MLA S Raghu decided to increase the number of civic wards from 198 to 243, Chief Minister B. S. Yediyurappa approved creating 243 wards. Delimitation Commission, headed by BBMP Commissioner Manjunath Prasad, was set up to decide on how to divide the city into 243 wards. The Delimitation Commission consists of Bengaluru Urban Deputy Commissioner, BDA (Bangalore Development Authority) Chairman and BBMP Special Commissioner Revenue (all IAS officers) as its members.

On 10 December 2020, the B. S. Yediyurappa government passed the Bruhat Bengaluru Mahanagara Palike (BBMP) Bill, 2020 in the Karnataka legislature. The BBMP Act will govern the municipal corporation. Various changes to the BBMP's structure was incorporated in the new Act. The BBMP Act increased the term length for the mayor and the deputy mayor to five years from one year. It also increased the number of zones from eight to fifteen. All fifteen zones would be headed by a zonal commissioner who reports to the BBMP's chief commissioner. The Act also forms constituency consultative committees (headed by the local MLA, consisting of councillors and resident association members) and zonal committees to monitor the implementation of projects and address public grievances.

== History of electoral results ==
SN	Party	Seats won (2001)	Seats won (2010)	Seats won (2015)
1	Bharatiya Janata Party	15	111	100
2	Indian National Congress	57	65	76
3	Janata Dal (Secular)	13	15	14
4	Others	15	7	8
	Total	100	198	198

== Structure ==
A mayor and deputy mayor of the council were elected for a period of 30 months, though not by popular vote. The post of the mayor and deputy mayor were filled through a quota system to a Scheduled Castes and Tribes candidate or to an Other Backward Class female candidate from among the elected Councillors. However, in the absence of an elected body from September 2020 onward, the BBMP was run by an Administrator and a Commissioner, both appointed by the State Government, for the remainder of its existence. The Additional Commissioner was a specially appointed IRS officer. The Bruhat Bangalore Mahanagara Palike was responsible for the civic and infrastructural requirements of the city. It often worked in conjunction with other civic bodies, including the Bangalore Development Authority (BDA) and the Agenda for Bangalore Infrastructure Development (ABIDe) task force — a body constituted in 2010 under then-Chief Minister B. S. Yeddyurappa to identify the city's civic problems and propose solutions — to design and implement civic and infrastructural projects.

== Dissolution ==
Under the Greater Bengaluru Governance Act, 2024, the BBMP's powers began transferring to the Greater Bengaluru Authority (GBA) from 15 May 2025, and the BBMP ceased to exist on 2 September 2025, when the GBA and five new city corporations — Bengaluru Central City Corporation, Bengaluru North City Corporation, Bengaluru South City Corporation, Bengaluru East City Corporation and Bengaluru West City Corporation — took over its functions. M. Maheshwara Rao, who had been serving as BBMP's Chief Commissioner since April 2025, was appointed Chief Commissioner and Member-Secretary of the GBA, providing administrative continuity between the two bodies.

Several practical questions were left unresolved at the point of handover. The Karnataka government released an interim grant of ₹125 crore — ₹25 crore to each of the five new corporations — drawn from BBMP's own accumulated property-tax reserves, to fund early operating costs while the new bodies set up independent administrative and financial systems; how BBMP's remaining financial allocations and physical assets would ultimately be divided among the five corporations remained contentious and unsettled. Plans for redeploying BBMP's existing staff across the GBA and the five corporations were also not finalised at the time of dissolution; separately, the new five-corporation structure was estimated to require more than 1,200 additional civic staff, adding an estimated ₹137 crore a year to the combined wage bill.

== Zones ==
BBMP was divided into 8 zones, for the ease of administration each headed by a zonal administrator answerable to the Commissioner:

1. Yelahaṅka Zone
2. Dasarahal̥l̥i Zone
3. Rājarājēśvarinagara Zone
4. Bommanahal̥l̥i Zone
5. South Zone
6. West Zone
7. East Zone
8. Mahādēvapura Zone

The B. S. Patil-headed BBMP Restructuring Committee submitted its final report to Chief Minister Siddaramaiah on 13 July 2015, recommending that the BBMP be split into five municipal corporations — North, Central, West, South and East — placed under an overarching Greater Bengaluru Authority (GBA), with each corporation in turn divided into two zones of 35–40 wards apiece (ten zones in total). The committee proposed raising the ward count from the then-198 to around 400 as the city's population grew, and recommended that Bengaluru eventually — the report suggested within about a decade — move to a directly elected Metropolitan Mayor heading the GBA, with Bengaluru remaining governed as a single city in the way it said London was.

This proposal was superseded by the Greater Bengaluru Governance Act, 2024, which established a different final structure. Rather than five equally sized 80-ward palikes totalling 400 wards, the Act created five city corporations of unequal size — Bengaluru Central City Corporation (63 wards), Bengaluru North City Corporation (72 wards), Bengaluru South City Corporation (72 wards), Bengaluru East City Corporation (50 wards), and Bengaluru West City Corporation (112 wards) — totalling 369 wards, coordinated by the apex Greater Bengaluru Authority (GBA). The GBA's Chairperson is the sitting Chief Minister of Karnataka, ex officio, rather than a separately and directly elected Metropolitan Mayor; each of the five city corporations in turn elects its own Mayor from among its corporators. For the implemented structure and its current office-holders, see Greater Bengaluru Authority and the individual city corporation articles.

BBMP's practice of administering the city through zonal offices under zonal commissioners carried over into the successor structure in modified form: each of the five city corporations now maintains its own, smaller set of zonal offices for local administration, in place of the single city-wide set of eight zones that BBMP had operated.

== Income and expenditure ==
The BBMP raises more than half if its annual income from the collection of property tax, a third from State government grants and the remainder received in Central government grants, direct service fees, licences (advertising hoardings) and rent from municipal owned property.

Because the BBMP had no elected council from September 2020 onward, its annual budgets in its final years were drawn up and approved internally by the Administrator and Commissioner rather than debated and passed by elected corporators, a process Citizen Matters described as "shrouded with mystery" for the 2022–23 budget. The 2023–24 budget was initially set at ₹11,885.57 crore, but actual expenditure for the year came in well below that, at ₹9,602.02 crore, after the corporation was unable to raise the revenue it had projected; the 2024–25 budget was subsequently set at ₹12,371 crore, revised upward from an earlier estimate after the state government increased BBMP's allocation. Analysts repeatedly criticised BBMP budgets for being drawn up incrementally from prior years' figures without clearly stated targets, and for being skewed toward public-works spending (such as roads) at the expense of social infrastructure: one analysis of the ₹11,163-crore budget presented for 2023–24 found per-capita spending of ₹1,567 from property tax, against ₹5,458 in Mumbai and ₹3,843 in Delhi, and found spending on roads and solid-waste management falling well short of the per-capita norms recommended by the central government's High Powered Expert Committee.

== Role of the BBMP ==
=== Property tax collection ===
A shift to a unit area self assessment method of property tax collection in Bangalore was successful, leading to a sharp rise in tax collection revenues. Phase one of the reforms starting in 2000 led to a 33 per cent increase in tax revenues, whilst a second phase initiated in 2007 led to a 74 per cent increase the following year.

=== Roads and infrastructure ===
Bangalore contains approximately 1,920 km of arterial and sub-arterial roads. Roads are badly constructed, full of potholes and frequently dug up and re-laid. The Deccan Herald describes an "unholy nexus of corporators and contractors [...] benefiting from the lucrative business of filling potholes, relaying and asphalting roads annually".

In 2005, Bangalore's IT industry — then still administered by the Bangalore Mahanagara Palike (BMP), as the BBMP did not yet exist — publicly protested the city's infrastructure, citing poor roads and traffic congestion among their grievances. The Bangalore Chamber of Industry and Commerce cited "traffic bottlenecks, power shortage and poor infrastructure at the airport" in calling for a boycott of a state IT conference, and a separate group of about 20 companies, the Bangalore Forum for Information Technology, announced its own boycott citing the "city's shoddy infrastructure"; industry figures including Bangalore Chamber of Industry and Commerce president Anant Koppar specifically blamed "the bad condition of the roads, traffic jams, and consequently the long commutes" for hurting productivity.

The BBMP's contracting system for the city's roads are reported to operate under a corrupt commission system. When work is tendered and the bid won by a contractor, a percentage (perhaps up to 20%) is paid to the area corporator, MLA and BBMP council.

In 2015, artist Nanjundaswamy installed a life-size crocodile as a form of protest against 'killer' potholes. This was followed a month later with the installation of a giant anaconda.

==== TenderSURE ====
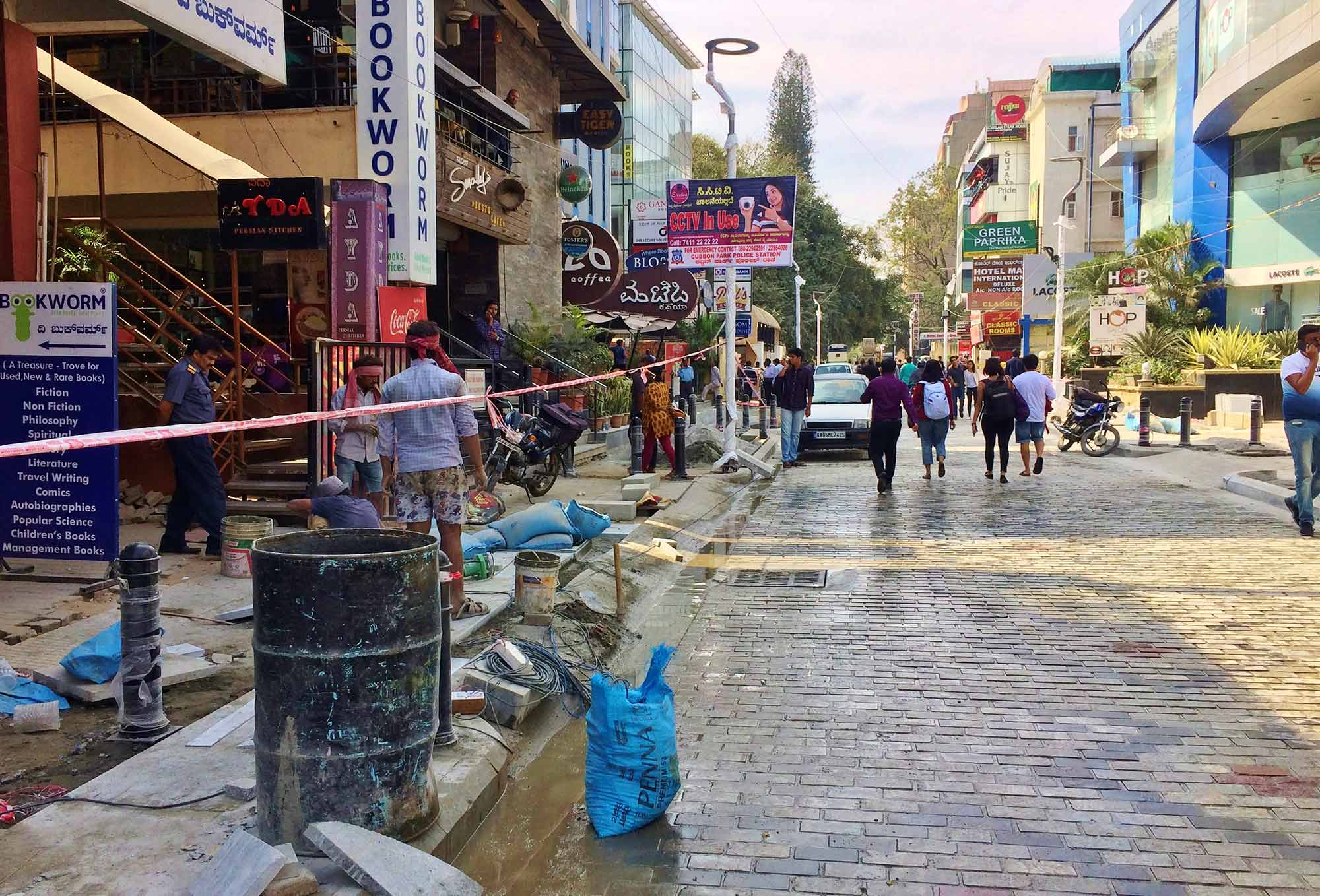
The redevelopment of Church Street under TenderSURE. This is the first road to be paved with granite cobblestones in Bangalore.

In 2011, the Jana Urban Space Foundation published a document called TenderSURE (Specification for Urban Roads Execution) which contained detailed guidelines for the design, specifications and procurement contracts needed to bring India's road infrastructure up to an international standard within the Indian context. The purpose of these guidelines was to enable the construction of urban roads that were designed for all road users (cars, buses, autos, bikes, pedestrians, street carts), that integrated all existing networked services (water, sewerage, power, OFC, gas and drainage) with provision for the future, and that would integrate the civic agencies to prevent roads being repeatedly re-dug and relaid. The ultimate objective was to give roads a lifespan of 10 years, instead of the existing one or two.

In 2012, the Government of Karnataka made budget allocations for 20 pilot roads to be implemented by the BBMP. The first of these roads, including St Marks and Museum Road, where completed in June 2015. Another 50 roads were sanctioned by the Government in the same year. In 2017, St Marks Road became a case study for the Global Designing Cities Initiative's Global Urban Streets Guide, making it the only model street selected from India.

=== Stormwater drains ===
The BBMP reports that it administers 741 kilometres of storm water drains and another 1,500 km of secondary drains. A large percentage of the Rs 600 crores allocated to the BBMP under the JnNURM scheme for repairs and upgrades of the city's storm water drains is reported to have been siphoned off, leading to a reduction in such funding from the central government.

=== Garbage disposal ===
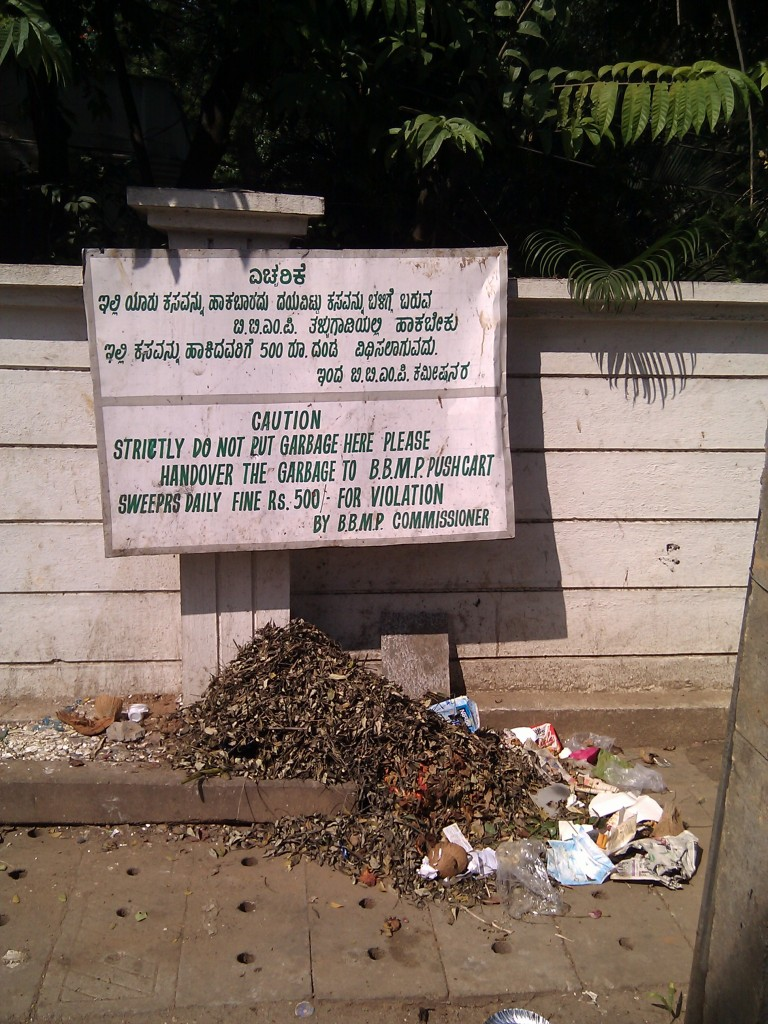
Rubbish is routinely dumped on the street in Bangalore.

Bangalore's waste volumes have grown strongly since 1990 and the BBMP has come under ongoing criticism for its mismanagement of the city's garbage disposal system, particularly throughout 2012–13 when Bangalore was routinely referred to as "Garbage City". Following the closure of Bangalore's two landfill sites in mid-2012 by the Karnataka State Pollution Control Board, the BBMP was left without any plan or alternative strategy for disposing of city's 3-4000 tons of daily waste. Garbage worker strikes and High Court rulings requiring the implementation of the Municipal Solid Waste Management Rules 2001 exacerbated the crisis whilst garbage accumulated on every street. The crisis abated somewhat from 2014.

A 2017 enquiry found no serious scrutiny of waste contractors, with the BBMP reimbursing contractors for around 200 crore in fake bills.

As of 2018, seven waste processing plants are reported to be operating at only one third of their capacity.

In April 2025, BBMP implemented a "garbage cess" under which the residents of Bengaluru had to pay a solid waste management user fee.

=== Public open space ===
Bangalore contains more than 416 neighbourhood parks. Current Karnataka legislation requires 15% of residential layouts to be retained for public open space, and an additional 10% for civic amenities. However, within the area of the BBMP one study estimated that only 8.4% of the urban area is parkland whilst the 2003 Bangalore Master Plan allocated only 2.01 sq m of green space per citizen, 6.99 sq m less than the minimum recommendation of the World Health Organisation. By way of comparison, the 'Urban Green Guidelines, 2014' issued by the Government of India calculates the average green space for cities worldwide at 18.6% and Bangalore's area of green space at less than 5%. Bangalore compares unfavourably with New Delhi, which has retained 20% of its urban area as public open space. It also demonstrates a significant deterioration since the 1960, when open space represented 17.2% of the total area.

=== Tree planting ===
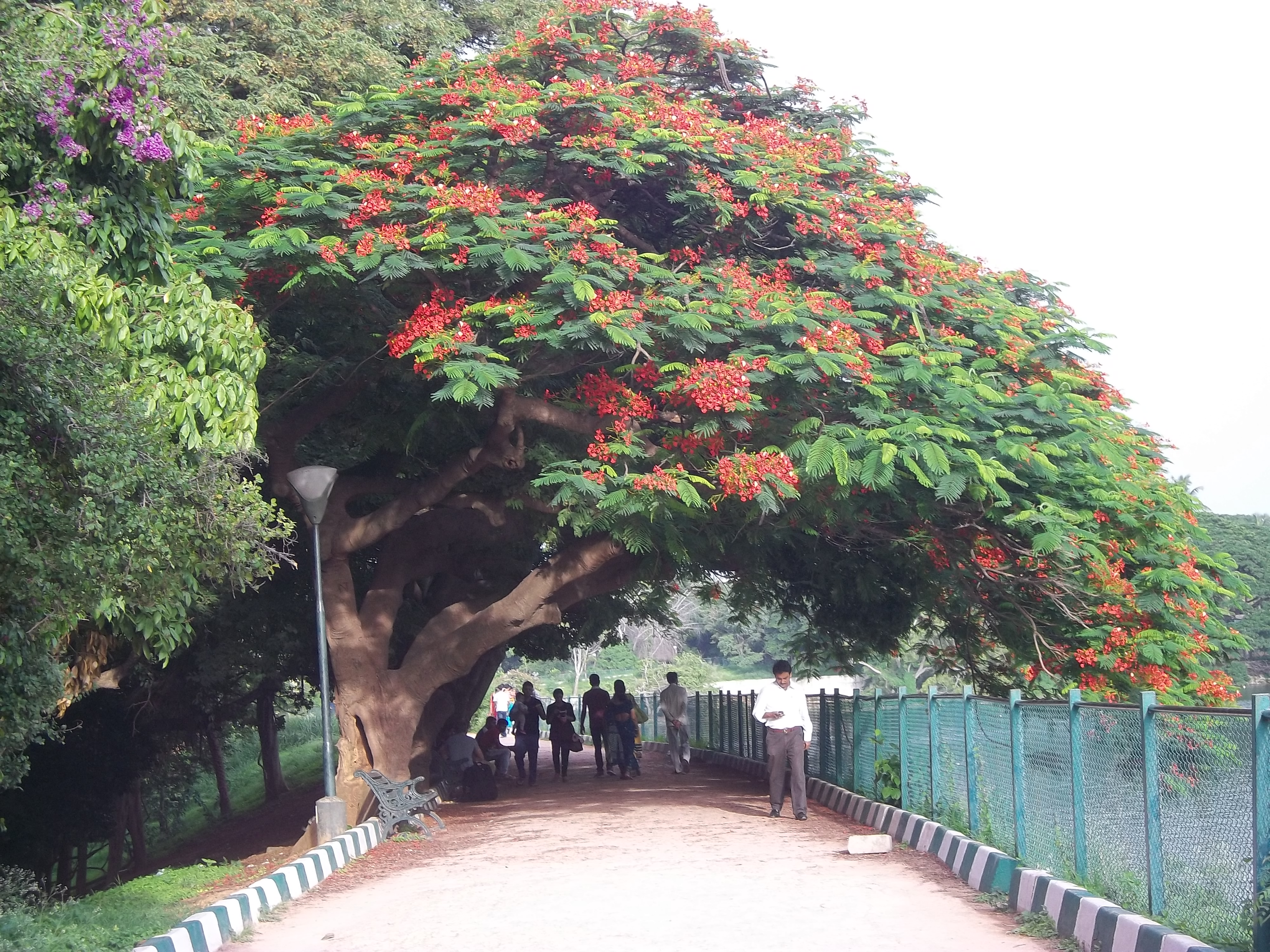
A Gulmohar tree in Lalbagh Garden, Bangalore. Widely planted in the 1980s these trees are no longer used in the BBMP's tree planting schemes.

The BBMP's responsibilities include planting and maintaining street trees. The BBMP has embarked upon numerous tree planting schemes over many decades and with varying levels of success. The most notable period of planting is held to be the period of 1982 and 1987 when Chief Minister R Gundu Rao appointed forest officer S G Neginahal to green the streets of Bangalore with more than 15 lakh trees. His systematic plantation program involved the establishment of new nurseries, the installation of tree guards, a five-year monitoring program and the replacement of any failed plantings. The reported success rate was 97% and most of the mature trees along Bangalore's major avenues date to this era.

More recently the BBMP has reported that between 2007 and 2013 more than 10 lakh trees have been planted with a survival rate of 64.5%. These numbers have been contested by civic agencies and citizen groups as inaccurate. The Bangalore-based Environmental Support Group did a ground survey to calculate a survival rate of 20 – 25%, assuming the trees were even planted at all whilst urban conservationist Vijay Nishanth estimates a survival rate of 10%. The BBMP places responsibility for this with the lack experience of their contractors. Contractors in turn blame the BBMP for failure to release funds and allocating sapling locations in places with no water or suitable growing conditions.

In 2017 the High Court of Karnataka directed the BBMP to plant an additional 10 lakh street trees and to form greening committees comprising activists and experts, and tree wardens. To comply with this directive the BBMP launched an app called 'BBMP Green' allowing residents to collect free saplings and plant them on their own streets. Activists criticised the program for essentially absolving the BBMP of the responsibility to maintain street trees within the city.

The BBMP's tree planting activities contrast unfavourably with the Forestry Department who plants half the number of trees per year at a lower cost and a reportedly 95% survival rate.

None of the BBMP's replanting schemes have compensated for the ongoing removal of existing trees within the city, both from private property and the destruction of previously planted street trees for street widening purposes. A 2010 study found the density of trees in Bangalore to be lower than many other Asian cities with an estimated 50,000 trees lost between the date of publication and 2016.

== Legacy ==
Over its 18 years of existence as the BBMP (2007–2025), the corporation held only two council elections, in 2010 and 2015, spending much of its final decade under a state-appointed Administrator rather than an elected council — a pattern commentators traced back to the earlier BMP's own extended administrator's-rule period after 2006. Commentary around the BBMP's dissolution tended to hold the corporation responsible in the public eye for chronic problems with potholes, garbage collection and flooding, as well as recurring corruption allegations in contracting, even as analysts such as Mathew Idiculla argued that much of the city's real decision-making power over planning, water supply and traffic actually sat with state-level parastatal bodies and MLAs who largely escaped equivalent scrutiny. Urban governance experts described the corporation's dissolution without ever holding a scheduled 2020 election as "a sad day" for elected local government in the city, even among those who supported splitting the unwieldy single corporation into smaller, more accountable units.

== See also ==
- Karnataka
- Kempegowda Award
- Municipal corporation
