= Hulimavu =

- Suburb
- Location within Bengaluru
- Coordinates: 12.87°N 77.60°E
- Country: India
- State: Karnataka
- Metro: Bengaluru
- Named for: Hulimavu Lake

Government
  - Type: Municipal Corporation
  - Body: BSCC

Languages
  - Official: Kannada
- Time zone: UTC+5:30 (IST)
- PIN: 560076
- Vehicle registration: KA-51

Hulimavu is a locality in the south of Bangalore under the Bommanahalli Zone of Bengaluru South City Corporation.

== History ==
Hulimavu was previously known as Amarapura, which came under the administration of Saarakeya (present day: Sarakki). Apparently Amarapura was derived from the word "Amra" or "Amru" which translates to Mango or "Sourness". Over years the name has evolved to its present name Hulimavu which in Kannada literally means "Sour mango". The then ruler of Saarakeya (17th century) is believed to have built the Kodandarama Swami Temple in Hulimavu for the well being of its citizens. Around 1600AD the temple was renovated with the installation of idols of Sita, Lakshmana and Anjenaya Swami. Sri Kodandarama Swami Bramhostava is celebrated every year. The temple was renovated again in 2002.

== Landmarks ==
Sri Ramalingeshwara Cave Temple, Meenakshi temple Royal Meenakshi Mall, and Hulimavu Lake are some known landmarks in the locality. Apollo and Fortis Hospitals on Bannerghatta Road are some of the hospitals in the vicinity. Indian Institute of Management(IIMB), School of Business Studies and Social Sciences of CHRIST (Deemed to be University), ITM Business School, BGS National Public School and AECS Maaruti Magnolia School are some educational institutions near Hulimavu. Bangalore's tallest completed skyscraper Mantri DSK Pinnacle is also present here.

== Accessibility ==
Hulimavu is located on Bannerghatta Road and is connected to most other parts of the city by BMTC bus services. Connectivity is supposed to further improve with the locality figuring in the Bangalore Metro Phase 2 plans. Cab services like Uber, Ola, Rapido and Bounce cater to the locality along with autorickshaw services

== Regenevation of hulimaavu ==
Hulimavu Lake in Bengaluru is a chronically endangered water body that has dried up multiple times due to a combination of summer heat, encroachment, and pollution. Rejuvenation efforts have faced setbacks, though recent reports indicate some progress.

== Reasons for the lake to dry up ==
- Intense summer heat: In May 2025, a BBMP official confirmed that Hulimavu was one of many lakes in the city that had completely dried up due to high temperatures.
- Encroachment: The lake's original area has been significantly reduced by unchecked construction and real estate development. A 2019 survey found the lake had shrunk by 20 acres due to encroachments.
- Pollution and neglect: The lake has suffered from the dumping of garbage, construction debris, and sewage, which degrades water quality and threatens its ecosystem. Weeds and hyacinth have also choked the water body.
- Over-extraction of groundwater: Surrounding borewells have depleted the groundwater aquifers, causing the lake to lose water instead of being replenished by it.
- Bund breaches: A significant breach in the lake's bund in November 2019 caused flooding in surrounding areas and demonstrated poor maintenance.

Restoration efforts and current status

- Interrupted work (2023–2024): A major rejuvenation project meant to be completed by January 2023 was halted midway, reportedly due to administrative and payment issues between the BBMP and the contractor. For several months, the paused work and official negligence left the lake turning into a garbage dump.
- Citizens' initiatives: Local residents' groups, such as Hulimavu Kere Taranga (HKT), have stepped in to organize regular clean-up drives to remove plastic and other waste.
- Resumed work (2025): By July 2025, reports indicated that restoration work was back underway. Updates from the HKT group on Facebook confirm that work is ongoing, including the construction of a storm water drain, silt traps, and a wetland area for natural filtration.
- Encouraging signs: BBMP officials have expressed that summer is an opportune time for rejuvenation, as dry lakes provide easier access for restoration activities.

Summary

While Hulimavu Lake has a history of drying up and degradation, recent volunteer and official efforts to restore it are progressing.
