= Jayaprakash Nagar, Bengaluru =

Jayaprakash Nagar ಜಯಪ್ರಕಾಶ ನಗರ J. P. Nagar
- Residential Neighbourhood; Commercial Hub of South Bengaluru
- Jayaprakash Nagar
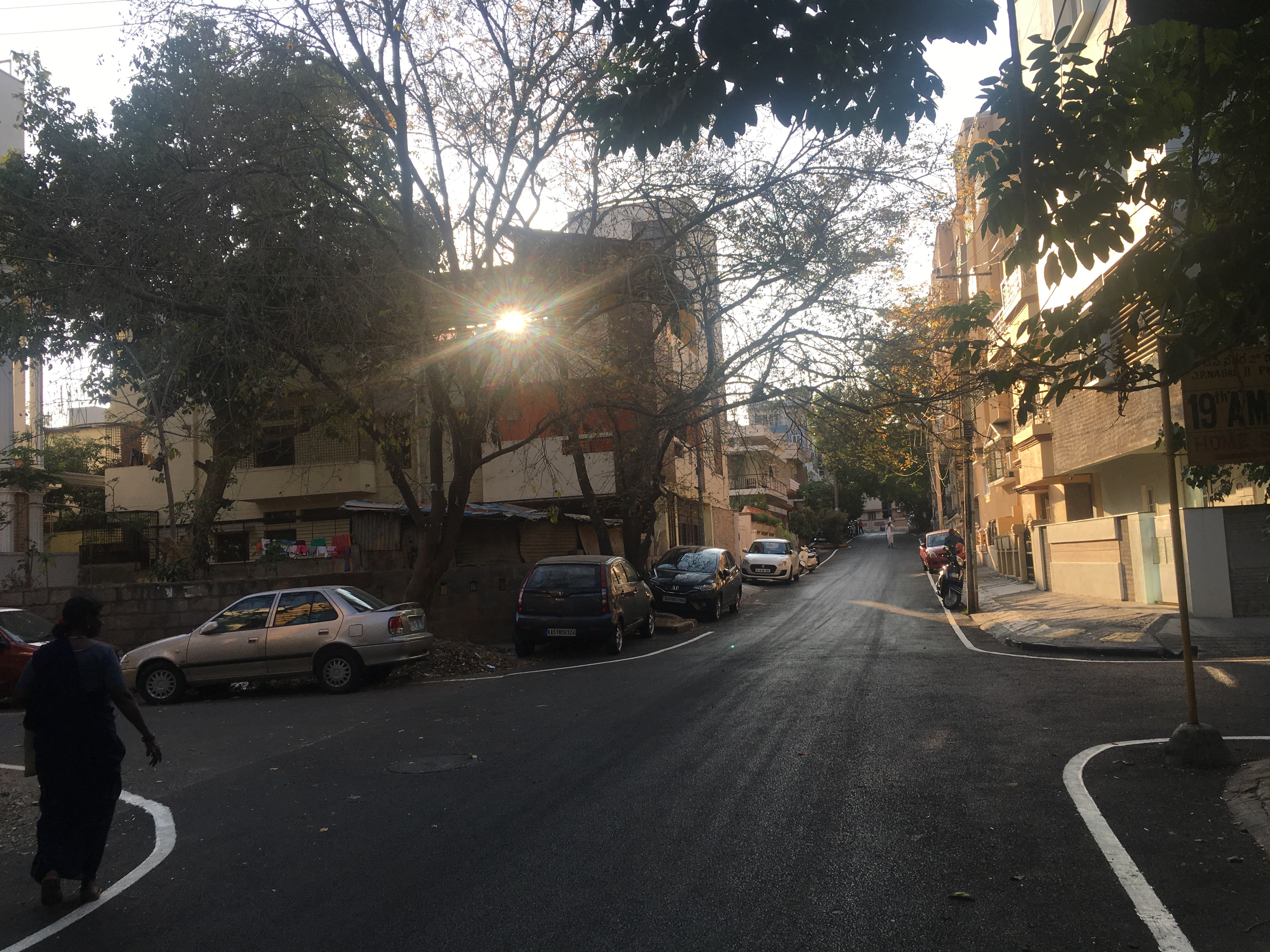
- Nickname: Jayaprakash Narayan Nagara (J.P Nagara)
- Location within Bengaluru
- Coordinates: 12.912°N 77.593°E
- Country: India
- State: Karnataka
- Metro: Bengaluru
- Named for: Jayaprakash Narayan

Population (280,000)
  - Total: 280 508

Languages
  - Official: Kannada, Telugu, Tamil and Hindi
- Time zone: UTC+5:30 (IST)
- PIN: 560062,560076,560078
- Vehicle registration: KA-05
- Municipal body: BBMP
- Ward Nos.: 177
- LS constituency: Bangalore South
- VS constituency: Jayanagara
- MP: Tejasvi Surya, BJP
- MLA: C K Ramamurthy, BJP

Jayaprakash Nagar also known as J P Nagar, is an upscale residential neighbourhood located in the south of Bangalore, India. It is named after prominent Indian leader Jayaprakash Narayan. It is an important commercial hub and a densely populated part of South Bengaluru.

It is well connected to metro through the metro stations of- Jayaprakash Narayan Nagar Metro, Banashankari Metro, RV Road Metro, Ragigudda Metro, Jayadeva Hospital Metro and to the upcoming metro stations of JP Nagar 4th Phase and JP Nagar 5th Phase.

It is located in proximity to Jayanagar, and other areas Banashankari, Bannerghatta Road, BTM Layout, Arekere, Hulimavu, Yelachenahalli, Puttenahalli, Doresanipalya, MICO Layout, Kumaraswamy Layout, Tavarkere and Anjanapura.

It was developed by the BDA (Bengaluru Development Authority) in the late 1970s and early 1980s to accommodate the growing population of Bengaluru as it expanded southwards of the city, and to relieve pressure from the old congested parts of Jayanagar, Banashankari and Basavanagudi.

It is divided into 10 divisions with Phases 1-3 within the Outer Ring Road, Phases 4-7 (Near Puttenhalli and Arekere West) and the remaining Phases of 8-10 bordering southern areas such as Kothnur Dinne, Jambusavari Dinne, Konanakunte, Amruth Nagar, Gottigere and Anjanapura. The 24th Main Road connects it to northern parts of Marenahalli, Jayanagar and intersects the Outer Ring Road junction at its geometric centre.

It was initially known as Sarakki Agrahara, known for its vegetable gardens, fruit orchards and fertile areas for agricultural activities. Some remnants of these gardens are seen in the Mini Forest park near J.P Nagara 3rd Phase.

== Development and Infrastructure ==
J.P. Nagar is primarily a residential neighborhood with a mix of independent houses, apartments, and villas. The area features various commercial establishments, including shops, restaurants, and offices. There are several parks and recreational spaces, contributing to the area's livability. Notable ones include the J.P. Nagar Park and the Dr. B. R. Ambedkar Park.

== Transportation ==
Well-connected by major roads and highways, including the Outer Ring Road and Kanakapura Road. Served by Bangalore Metropolitan Transport Corporation (BMTC) buses and is also accessible by auto-rickshaws and taxis. The Namma Metro's Yellow Line (R V Road - Bommasandra) passes through J.P. Nagar, enhancing connectivity.

== Educational Institutions ==
Numerous schools and educational institutions are located in the area, such as JSS Public School and BGS International School. There are also several colleges and higher education institutions nearby.

== Healthcare Facilities ==
The area is home to several healthcare facilities, including hospitals and clinics, such as the Sakra Premium Clinic and Fortis La Femme Hospital.

== Commercial and Social Amenities ==
Various shopping complexes and markets, including the Gopalan Legacy and other local markets. A wide range of restaurants, cafes, and eateries offer diverse culinary options.

== Real Estate ==
The real estate market features a variety of property options, including apartments and housing at various price points. J.P. Nagar features a planned layout and parks, functioning as a residential area. J.P. Nagar contains residential, commercial, and recreational infrastructure, as well as transit connections to Bangalore.
