= Jayanagar, Bengaluru =

Jayanagar
- Neighbourhood
- Jayanagar
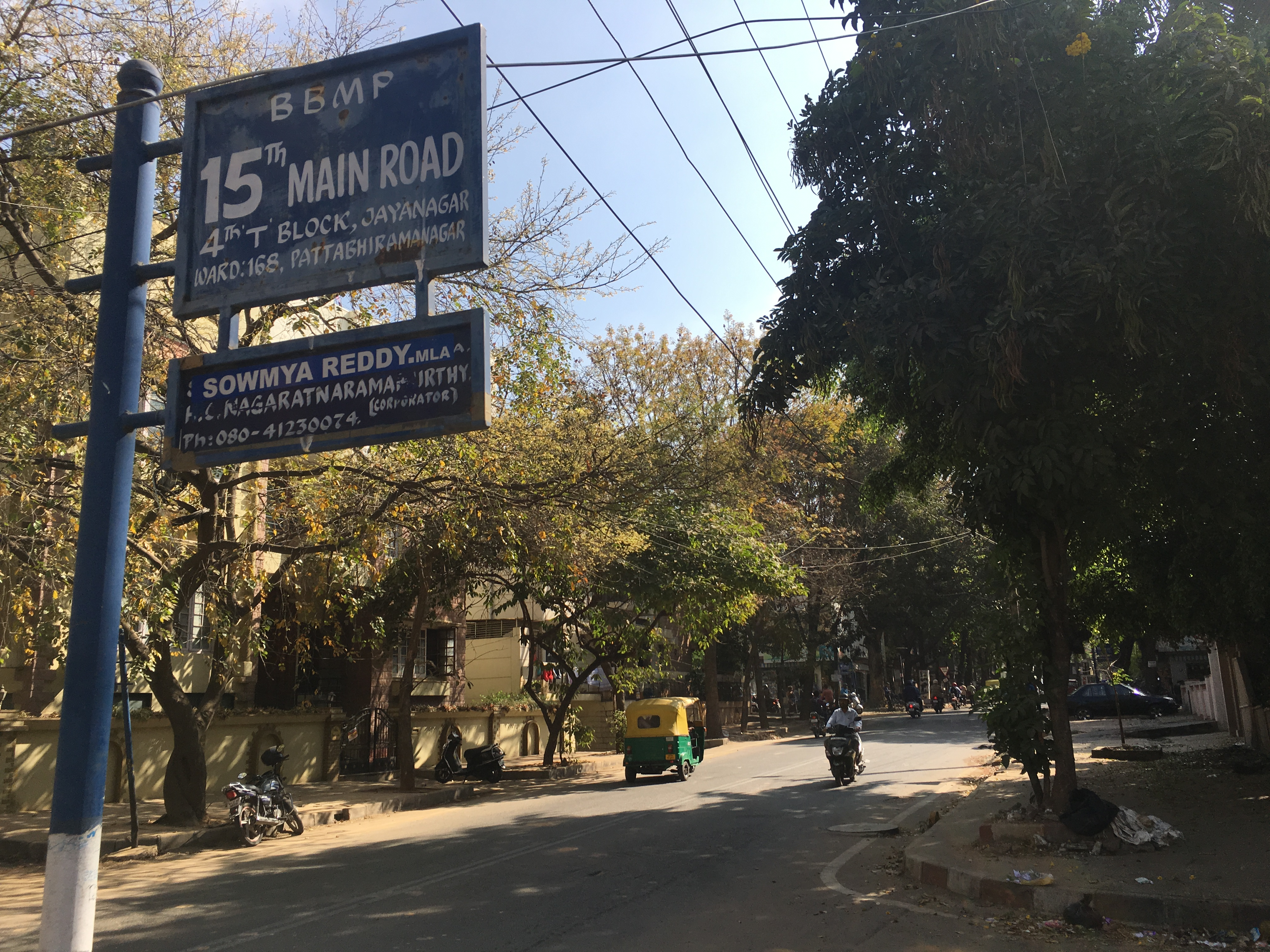

- Location within Bengaluru
- Coordinates: 12.925°N 77.595°E
- Country: India
- State: Karnataka
- Metro: Bengaluru
- Established: 1948

Languages
  - Official: Kannada
- Time zone: UTC+5:30 (IST)
- PIN: 560011, 560041, 560082, 560029,560070,560069
- Vehicle registration: KA-05

Jayanagar is a residential and premium commercial neighbourhood in Bengaluru, India. It is one of the zones of Bruhat Bengaluru Mahanagara Palike. It is sub-divided into seven wards.

It is surrounded by Basavanagudi, JP Nagar, Wilson Garden, Banashankari, Gurappanapalya, Suddaguntepalya, Tavarkere BTM Layout among other areas. It is in proximity to the Lalbagh Botanical Gardens. Jayanagar is divided into 10 blocks (From Blocks 1-9 including 4th 'T' Block') the 3rd and 4th blocks are largely commercial hubs, while the rest are mostly residential.

Some of its sub areas include- Tilaknagar, Tata Silk Farm, Yediyur, Kottapalya and Ragigudda.

A 2010 survey by DNA Bengaluru ranked Jayanagar as the most liveable place in Bengaluru that still maintains the old charm of the city.

== History ==
As per the Kannada language, The word "Jayanagar" when split into two words, Jaya and nagar literally makes it Victory City. It is not definitively known why that is. One school of thought is that Jaya comes from Mysore's Maharaja Jayachamarajendra Wadiyar.

The foundation of Jayanagar was laid in the year 1948. It was one of the first planned neighbourhoods in Bengaluru, and at the time, the largest in Asia.

Jayanagar was traditionally regarded as the southern end of Bengaluru. The "South End Circle", where six roads meet, and the historic Ashoka Pillar (which was to mark the southern end) bear this fact. While newer extensions have taken away this distinction from Jayanagar, it remains one of the more southern parts of the city.

In 1976, during the regime of D. Devaraj Urs, another iconic structure was added to Jayanagar, the Jayanagar BDA Shopping complex. It also housed the famous Puttanna Kanagal theatre. There was a fire in 2008. Later a new development project was initiated in 2011-2012 during the tenure of B. S. Yediyurappa and B. N. Vijaya Kumar worth around 193 crores that also involved demolishing the Puttanna Kanagal theatre.

== Population ==
Jayanagar constituency has seven wards and had 1.8 lakh voters as of 2013.

== Schools and colleges ==
Notable schools and colleges in Jayanagar include

- Carmel Convent School
- Jain University, Jayanagar campus
- National College, Bengaluru
- NMRKV College for Women

== Healthcare Centres ==
- Sri Jayadeva Institute of Cardiovascular Sciences and Research
- Indira Gandhi Institute of Child Health, Bengaluru
- Sanjay Gandhi Institute of Trauma and Orthopaedics
- Jayanagar General Hospital
- Manipal Hospital
- Apollo Speciality Hospitals
- Cloudnine Hospital
- Chirag Hospital
- Keva Ayurveda Healthcare Pvt Ltd
- CB Physiotherapy Clinic
- Sagar Hospital Jayanagar

== Notable residents ==
- Prakash Belawadi, national award-winning filmmaker
- Bharathi, Kannada actress
- B. S. Chandrasekhar, former Indian cricketer, leg spinner
- Amoghavarsha JS, award winning Indian filmmaker
- Shashi Deshpande, writer
- V. V. Giri, former president of India
- Puttanna Kanagal, Kannada movie director
- Kashinath Hathwara (actor), Kannada actor
- Anil Kumble, Cricketer
- N. R. Narayana Murthy, Infosys founder
- Sudha Murty, Writer, Teacher, Philanthropist, Infosys Foundation Chairperson
- Bhargavi Narayan, Kannada actress
- Raja Ramanna, nuclear physicist
- S. K. Ramachandra Rao, scholar
- Tara, actress and politician
- G. Venkatasubbiah, Kannada and Sanskrit scholar, writer, Grammarian, editor, lexicographer
- Vishnuvardhan, Kannada actor
