= JKV =

JKV may refer to:

- Cherokee County Airport (Texas)
- Jyothy Kendriya Vidyalaya, a school in Bangalore
- Junien kulunvalvonta, a train protection system used in Finland; see Finnish railway signalling
