= Ragigudda Anjaneya Temple =

Ragigudda Prasanna Anjaneyaswamy Temple
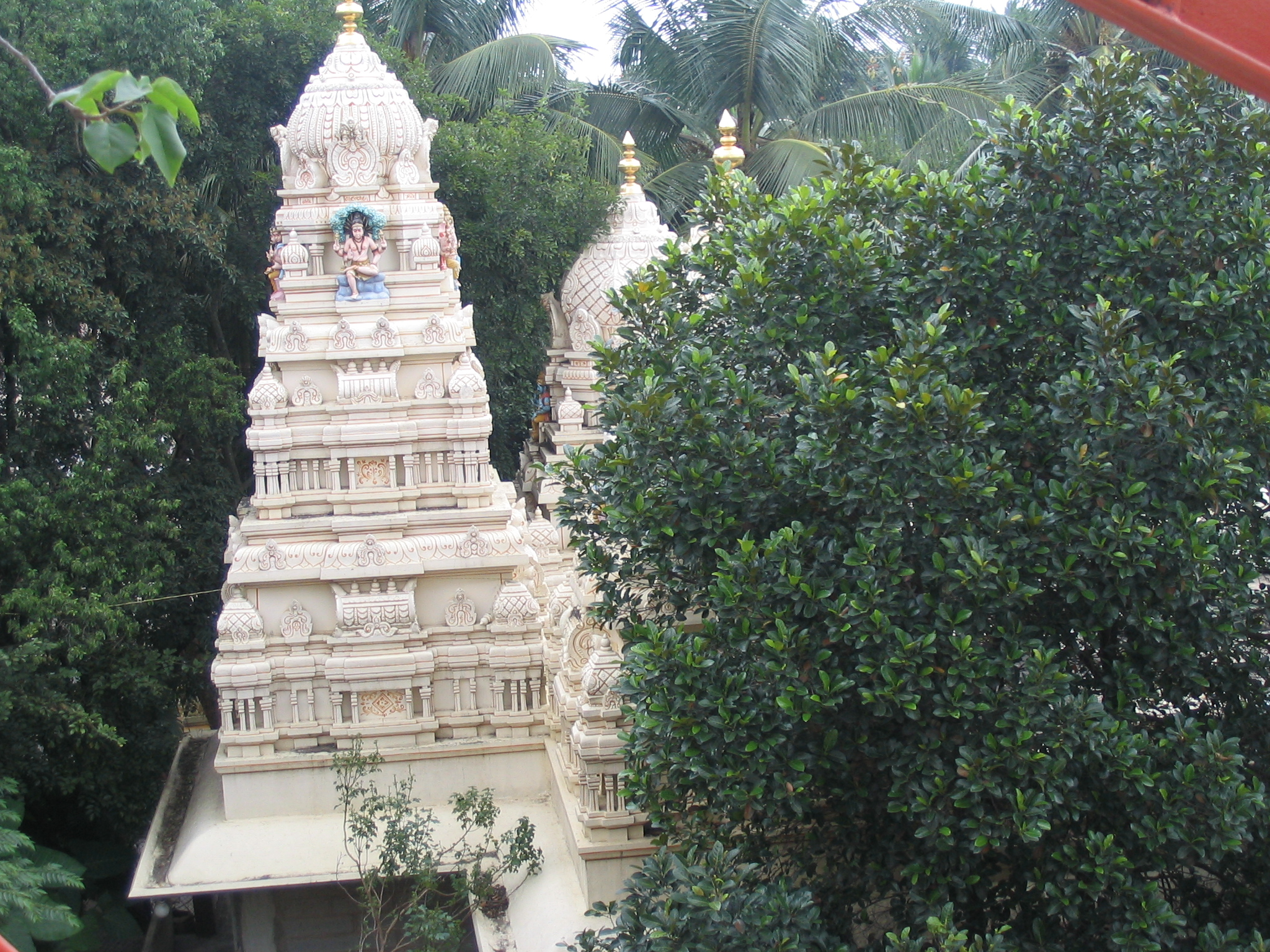
- View of the temple dome

- Location within Bangalore

Religion
- Affiliation: Hinduism
- District: Bengaluru Urban
- Deity: Hanuman
- Festivals: Hanuman Jayanti, Ram Navami
- Governing body: Ragiguddada Sri Prasanna Anjaneyaswamy Bhaktha Mandali Trust
- Status: Functional
- Features: Temple tank: Pushkarni

Location
- Location: Jayanagara 9th Block, Bengaluru
- State: Karnataka
- Country: India
- Coordinates: 12.91424°N 77.59320°E

Architecture
- Style: Dravidian style
- Founder: the effort of a group of dedicated youth
- Established: 1972
- Groundbreaking: 1969
- Completed: 1969

Website
- Ragigudda

The Ragigudda Prasanna Anjaneyaswamy Temple, commonly referred to as Ragigudda Temple or Ragigudda Anjaneya Temple is a temple to Hanuman, spread across 5 acres with a hillock in Jayanagara 9th Block area in Bengaluru, Karnataka, India. The temple also houses a lingam along with Rama, Sita, Lakshmana along with the main deity of Hanuman in the same precinct. The temple is on a hillock. There is a smaller temple dedicated to Ganesha, Navagrahas and the Tripura Sundari at the base of the hillock. It also houses a Trimurti Sannidhi to the Hindu holy trinity of Brahma, Vishnu and Shiva on huge engraved rocks at the side of the temple.

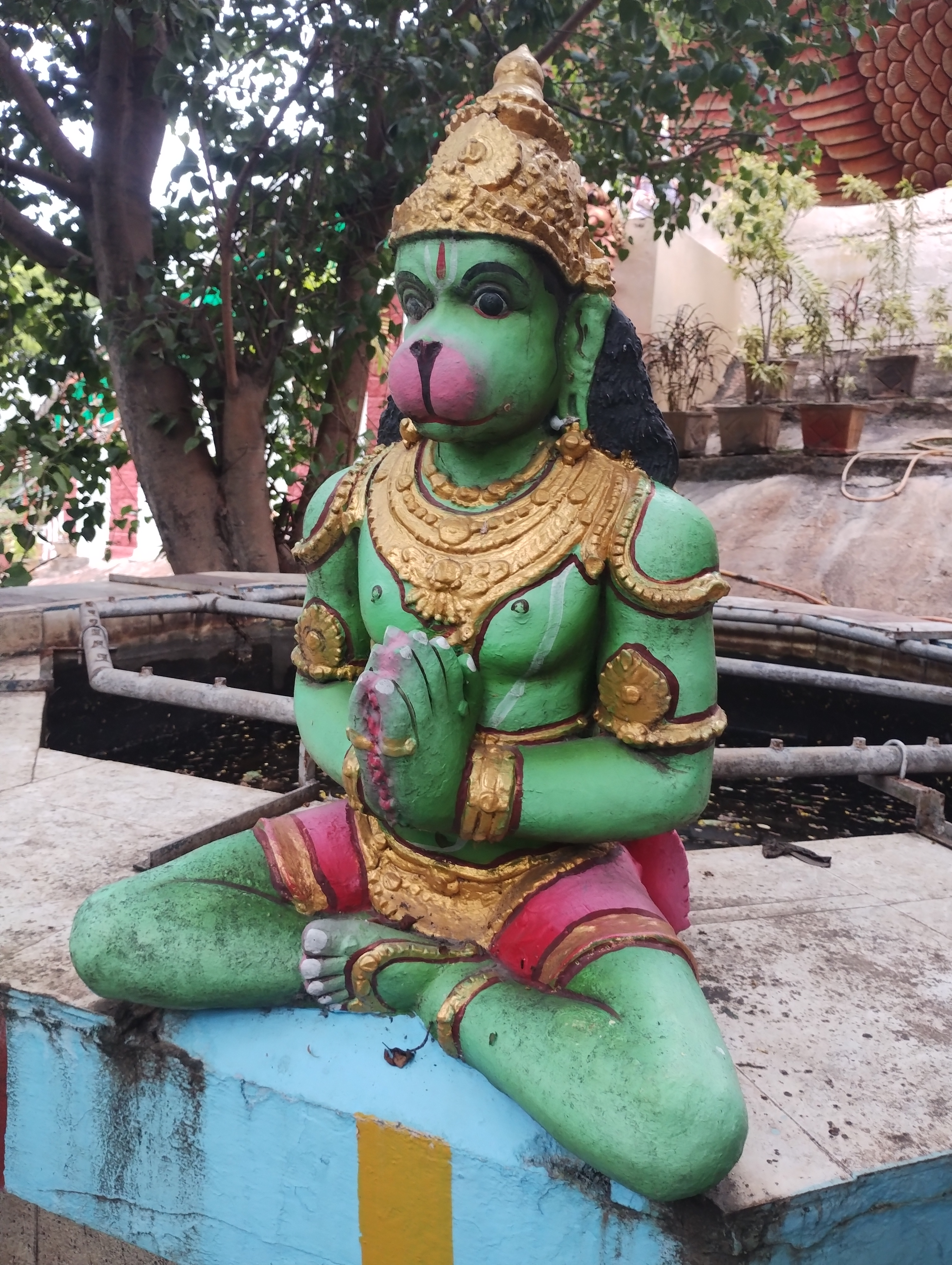

== History ==
It is believed that the hillock or Gudda in Kannada language that hosts the main deity Sri Prasanna Anjaneya Swamy was formed from a heap of Finger Millet or Ragi and hence was termed "Ragigudda". Local mythology has it that this place owes it to a devout lady Sudharma who was the wife of a local chieftain. She is an embodiment of good character and a very pious. One day the trinity comes in the form of visitors and asks for bhiksha (alms). She gives them newly harvested Raghava Dhanya or Ragi. Her mother-in-law disapproves of it and wants it back. This being an unholy act she says that if the visitors do not want the bhiksha then she does not need the Ragi. This Ragi becomes a hillock. In the end, the holy trinity is pleased with her selfless behaviour and grants her their sacred darshan. The holy trinity expressed their will to remain near the hillock and turned themselves into stones nearby. These three stones now bear the engravings of the trinity.

The temple was formed in 1969 and registered in 1972.

== Festival ==
In December every year, the festival of Shree Hanuman Jayanthi (the birth anniversary of Hanuman) is celebrated as a 12-day event at the temple with over 35,000 pilgrims attending the festivities.

== Gallery ==
The temple and the premises
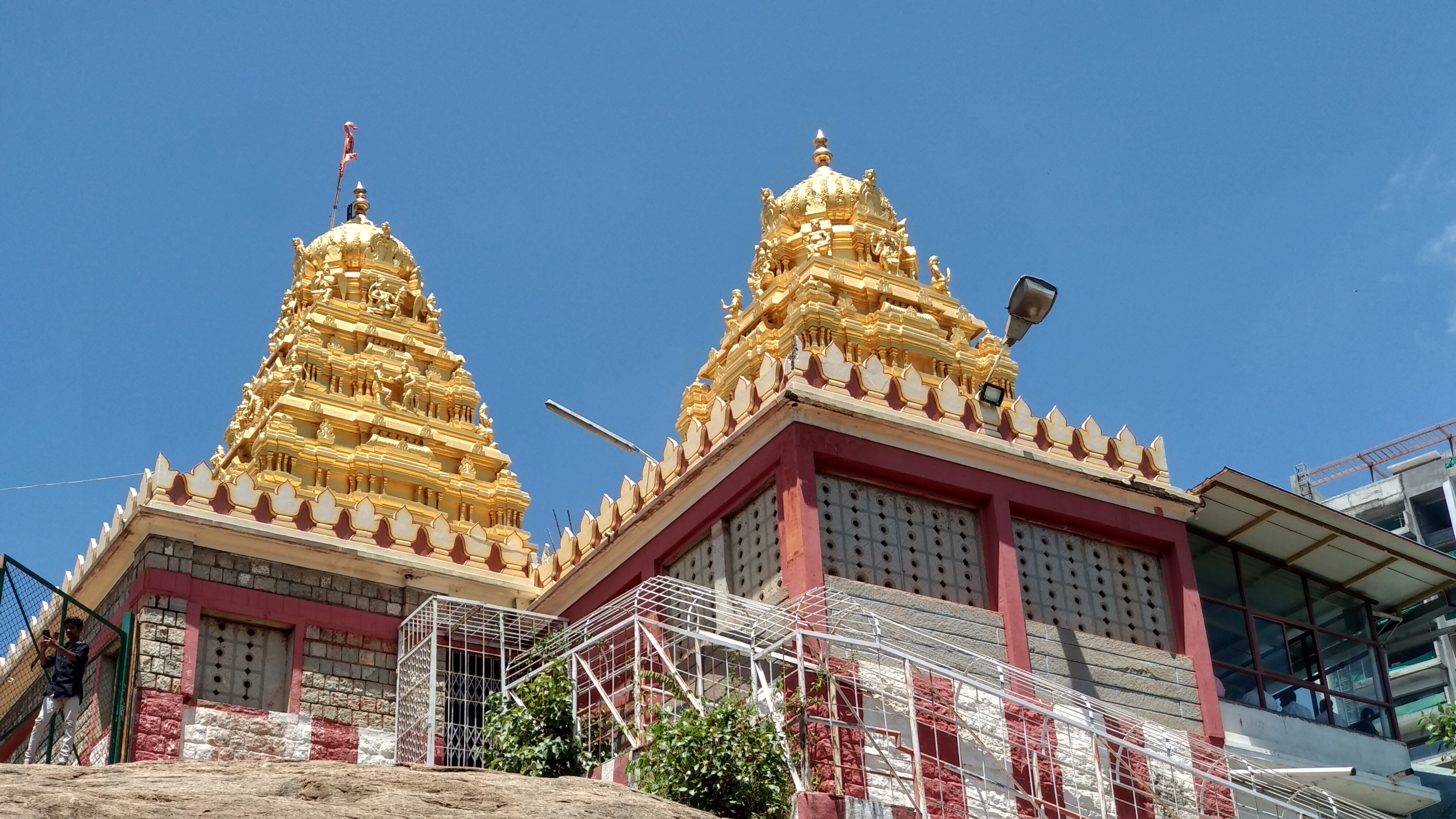
Ragigudda Main Temple

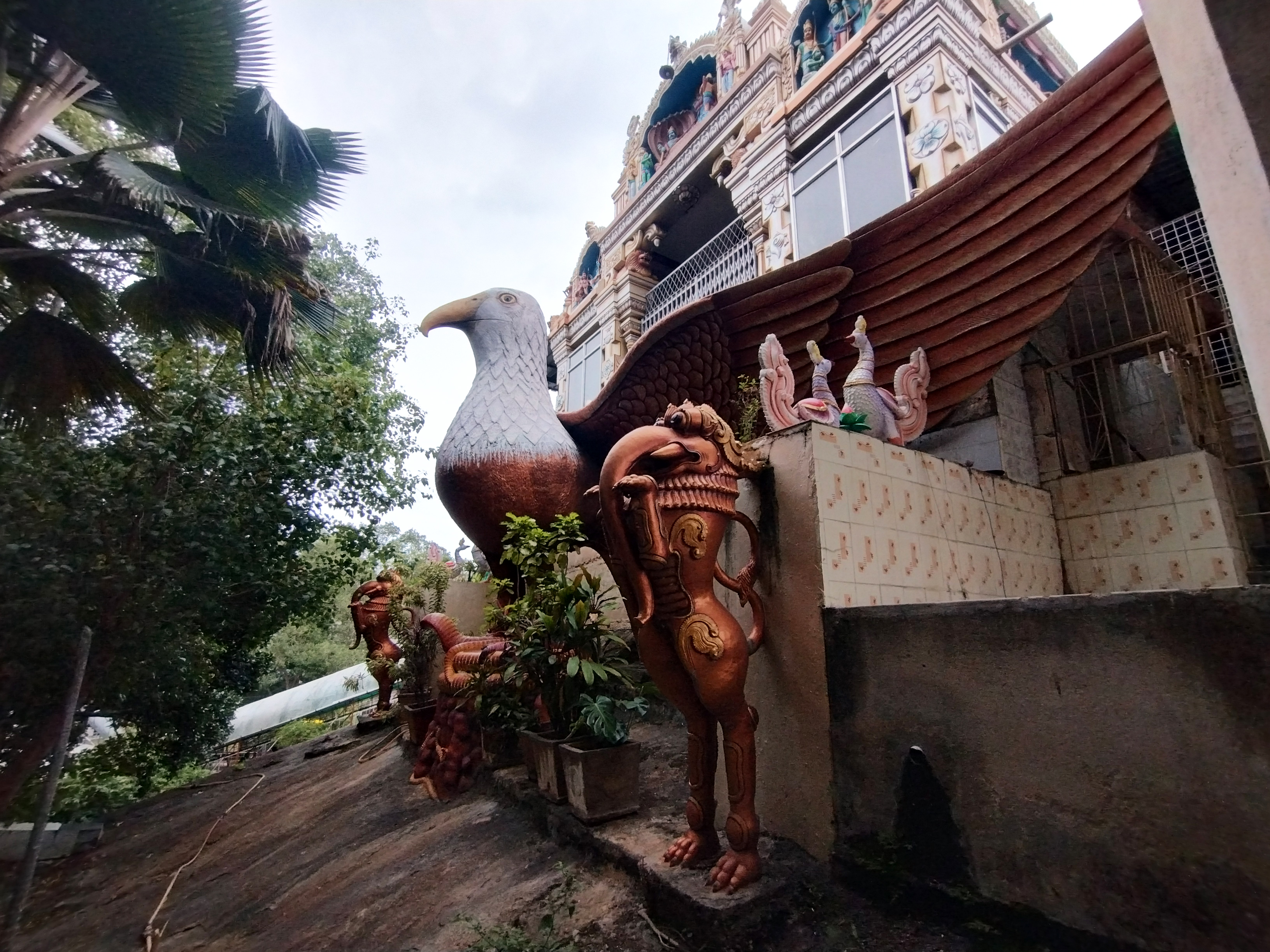
Sculptures in the temple

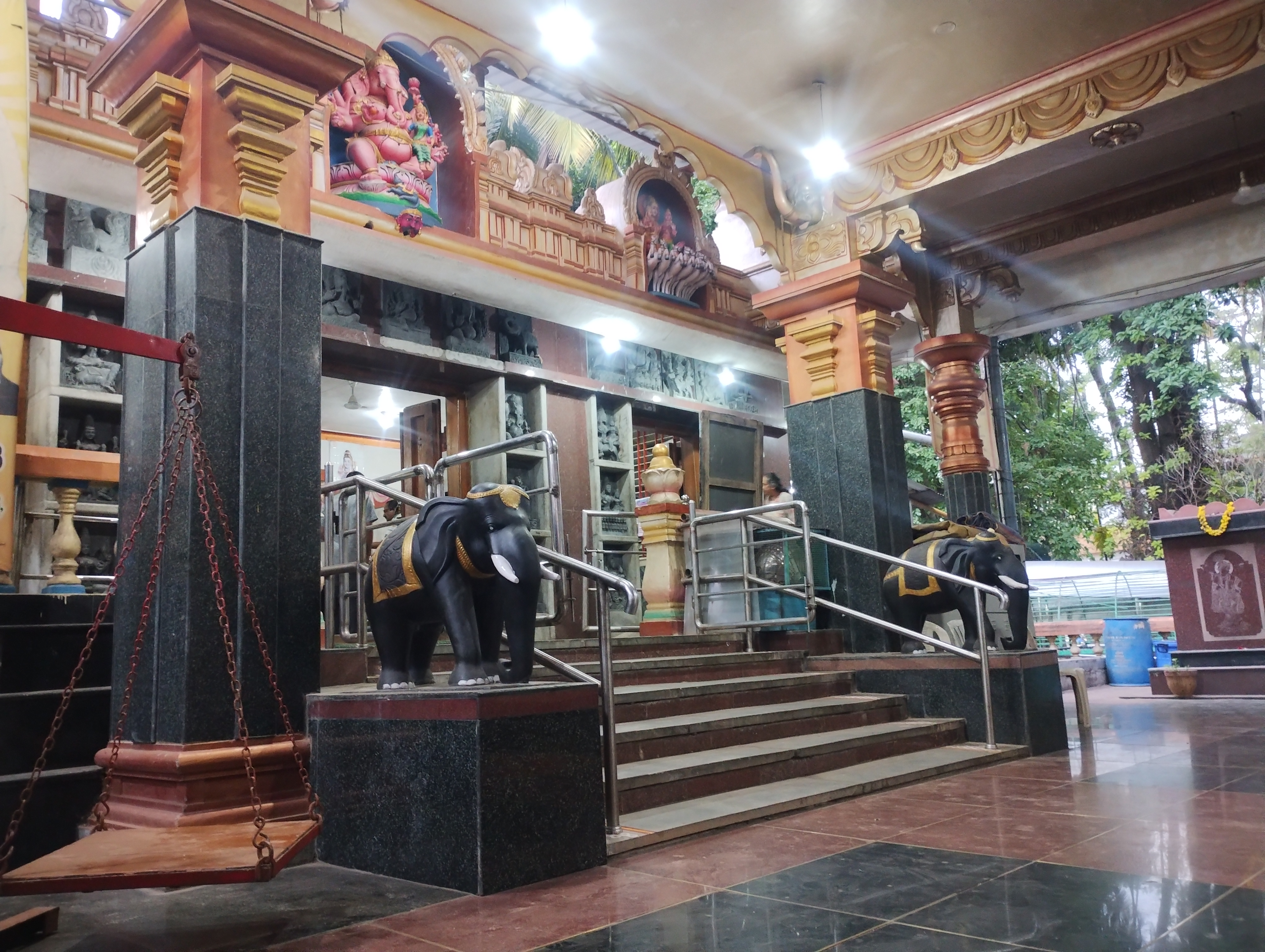
Interiors of the temple

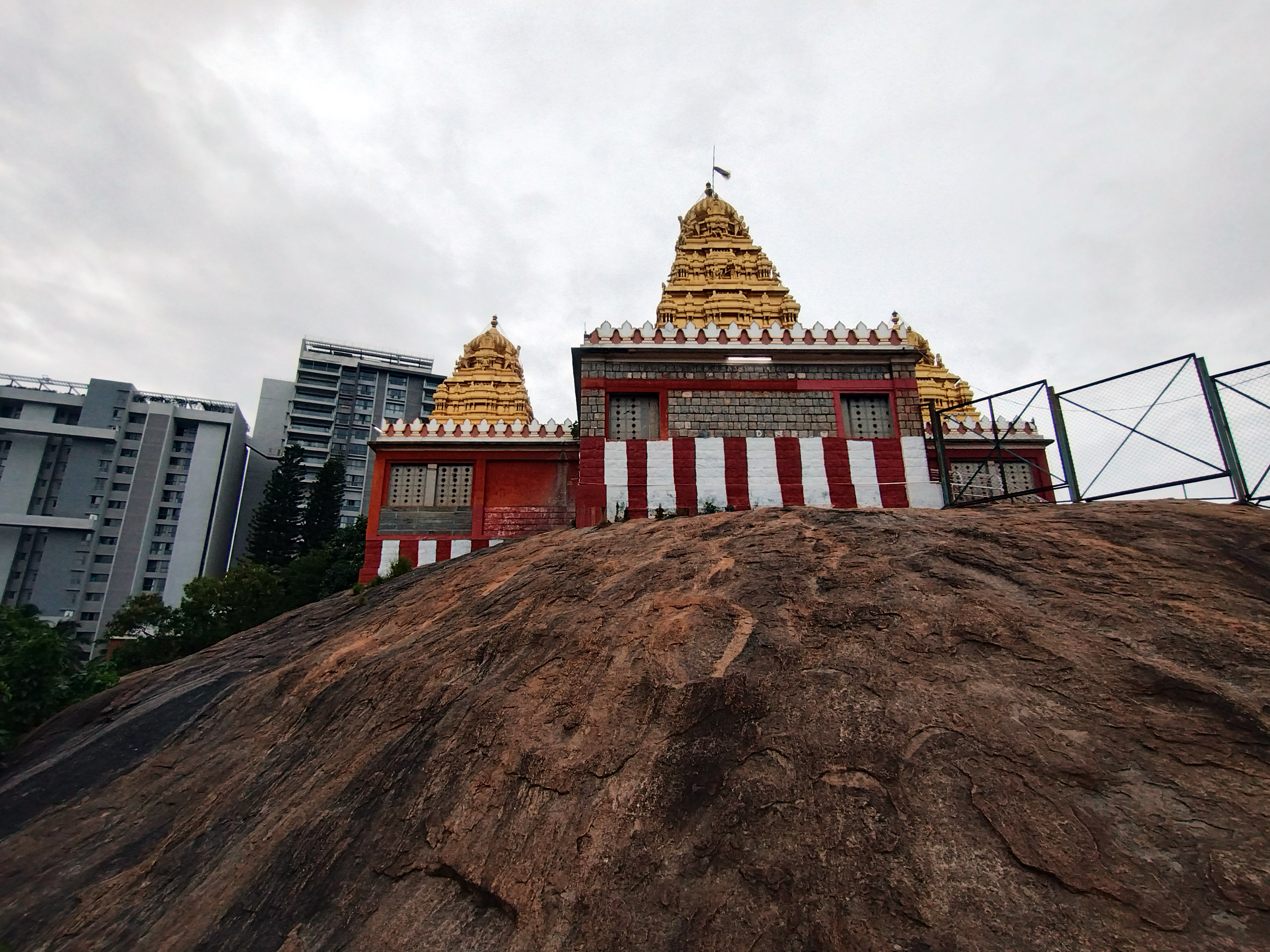
Back view of the temple

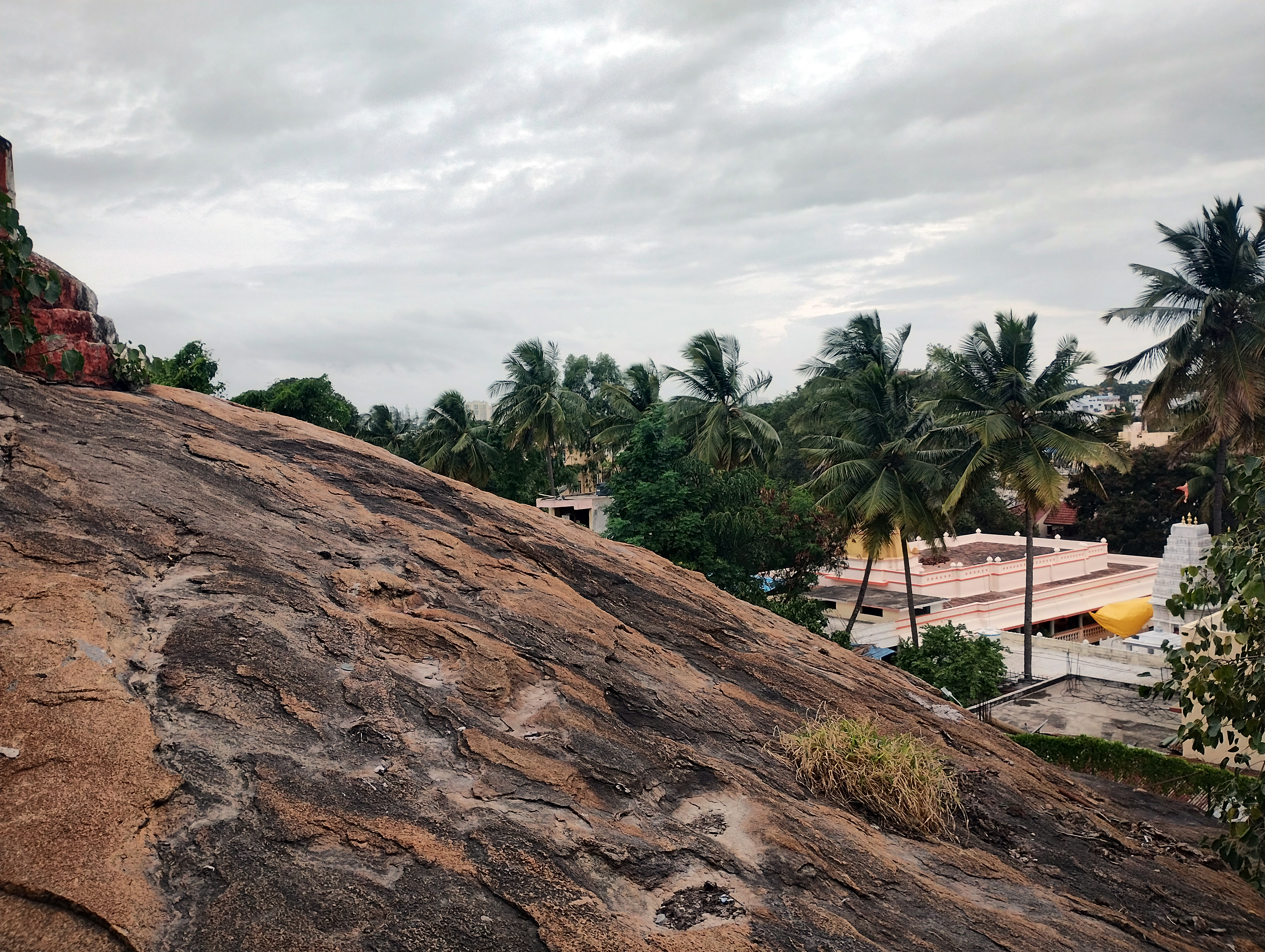
View around the temple
