= Anjanapura inscriptions and hero stones =

15th century inscription

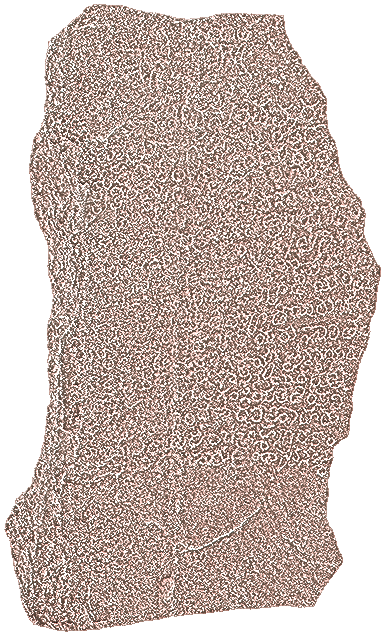
- Digital Image Obtained by 3D Scanning of The of Anjanapura 15th-century Anjeneya Temple Inscription
- Material: Stone
- Writing: Kannada
- Present location: 12.85373°N 77.55312°E

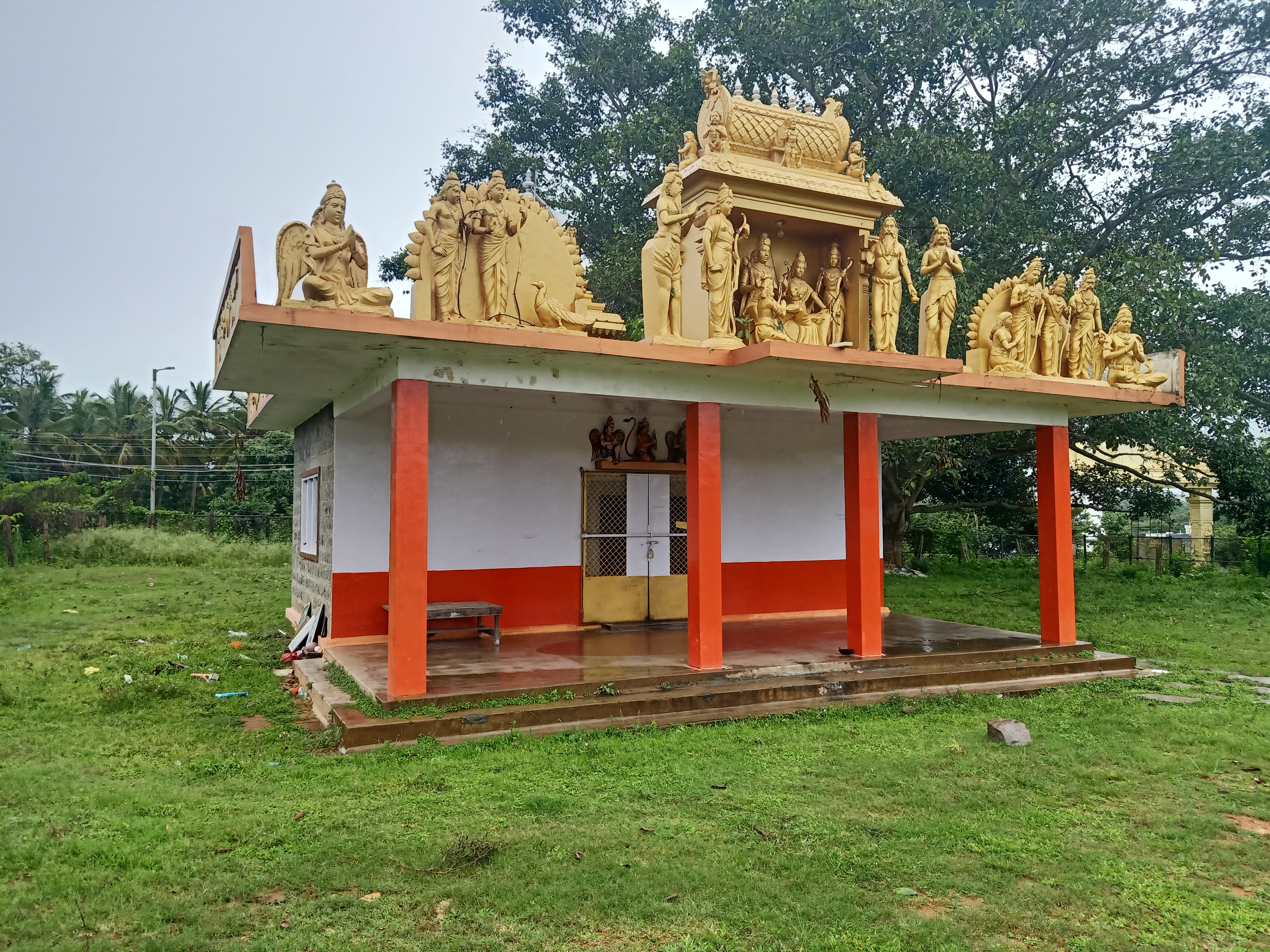
Anjaneya Temple.

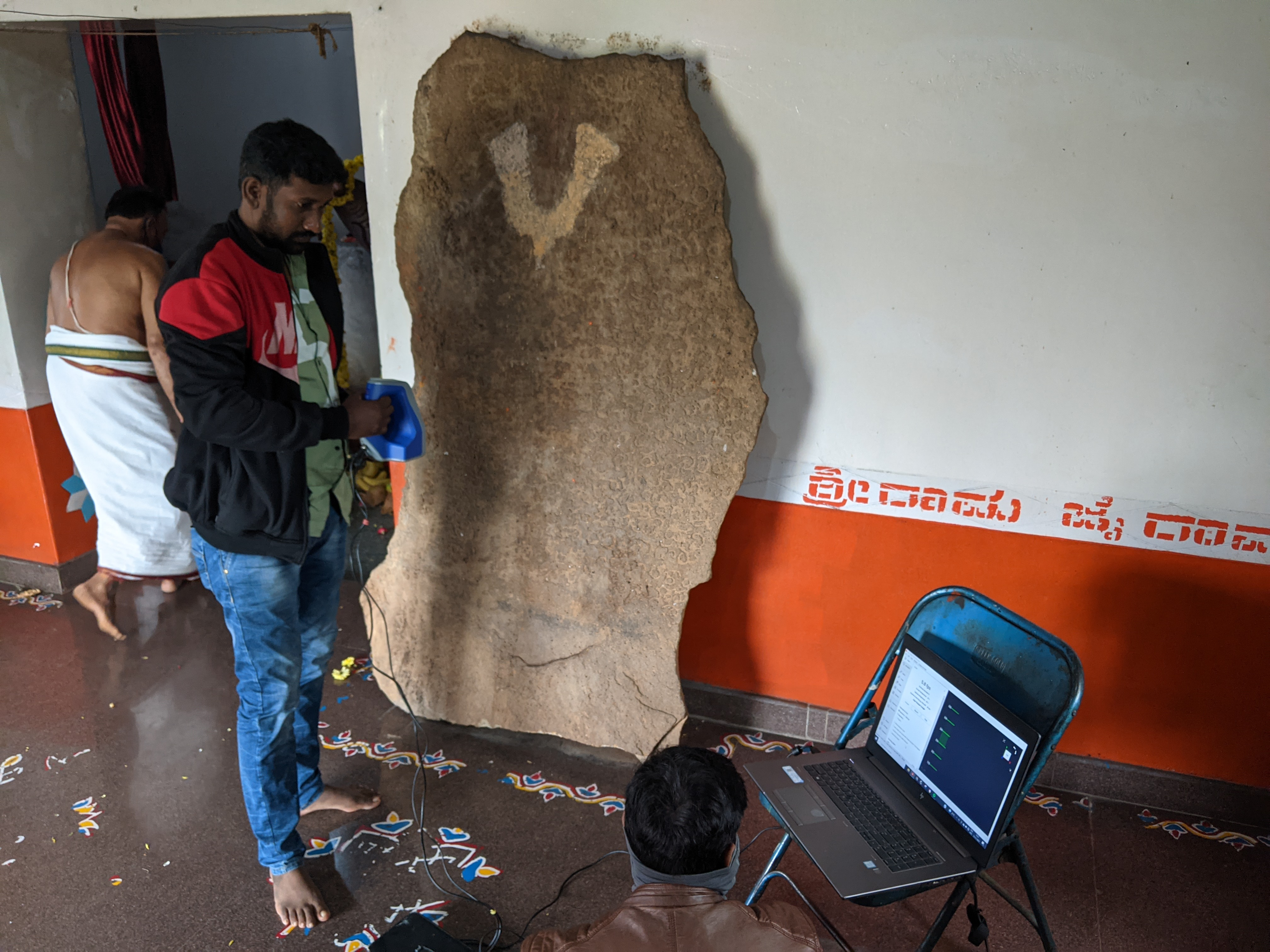
3D scanning of the Anjanapura 15th-century Anjeneya Temple Inscription.

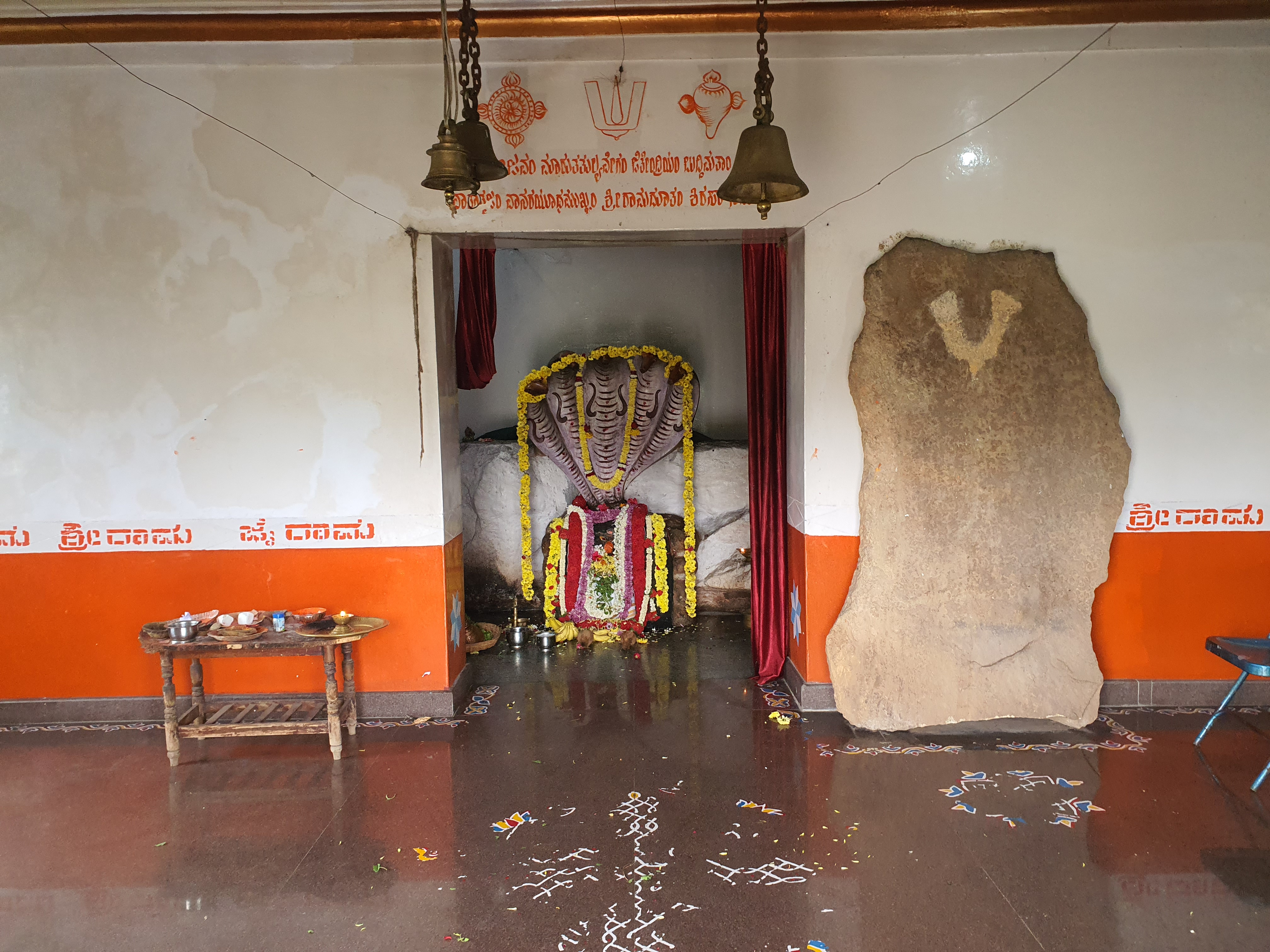
Anjanapura 15th-century Anjeneya Temple Inscription.

It is a Kannada inscription paleographically dated to the 15th century CE, discovered by the Mythic Society Bengaluru Inscriptions 3D Digital Conservation Project team in April 2022 in the Anjaneya Temple, Anjanapura. Much information cannot be contextualized as the text is effaced but appears to be a donatory inscription. The measurement of the inscription is 179 cm in height and 100 cm in width. The typical character size of the Inscription is 4.9 cm tall, 7.1 cm wide and 0.15 cm deep.

== Transliteration of the text ==
The inscription is of 18 lines and the transliterated text of the inscription in Kannada and IAST are as follows.

	Modern Kannada	IAST
1	ಪಾರ್ತಿವ ಸಂವಾತ್ಸರದ	Pārthiva Samvathsarda
2	ಪಾಲ್ಗುಣ ಸು೩ ಲು ಶ್ರೀ	Pālguna su3 lu śrī
3	ಮತು.........ಯರು	Matu........... Yaru.
4	ರು ತಿಂಮ	Ru tìmma............
5	................ ದ.......	................ da....................
6	..........................	................................
7	........................... ಆಳಿ.	............................. ālli
8	.........................	............................................
9	..........................ವೊಡೆಯರ್ ಕು	............................ võdêyara ku
10	............... ಯ ದೇವವೊಡಯರು	..................... Ya devavõdêyaru cêm
11	............................ ಯರು ಸಾಲಿ (?)ತ	............................... yaru sāli(?)ta.
12	....................... ಕಯ್ಯ.. ನಾಯಕ್ಯರು	......................... Kavya.nāykaru
13	.............. ಸಾಸನ ಯಿದಕ್ಕೆ ಆ	............................ Sāsāna yidakkê ā
14	.......... ಗಂಗೆಯ ತಡಿಯಲಿ	................ gāngeya tādiyali
15	...............ಕೊಂದ ಪಾ [ಪ ]	.................. Kōmda Pā[pa] dali hoharu
16	............ ಬ್ರಾಹ್ಮಣರ ಕೊಂ	..................brāmhanāru Kōm
17	ದಾ........................	dā......................
18	............................ ನ ಧರ್ಮ	.......................... nā dharmma
