= Jyothy Kendriya Vidyalaya =

Coordinates: 12.8953°N 77.5702°E

- Bangalore, Karnataka; India

Information
- Type: Private school
- Motto: Vishema Jyotihi Vindema Shreyaha
- Established: 1989
- President: Late BNV Subrahmanya
- Principal: Suma Jagadeesh
- Enrollment: LKG - 10(CBSE board), 11-12(PU Board)
- Website: http://jyothyvidyalaya.org/

Jyothy Kendriya Vidyalaya is a co-educational English medium school located in Yelachenahalli, Kanakapura Road, Bangalore in India. It was established in 1989 by Late.Sri. B.N.V Subrahmanya in memory of his daughter Jyothy.

The school is affiliated to the CBSE for 1st to 10th, and Karnataka PU board for 11th and 12th. The school is run by the Jyothy Charitable Trust. The trust is registered with the Commissioner of Income Tax, Karnataka-II under Section - 80 - G of the I.T. Act of exemption.

The trust runs a fund to provide scholarships for meritorious students. Free books and uniforms as well as fee concessions are given to deserving students every year.

== Origins ==
The school started with a strength of less than 100 students from 1st std. to 4th std. in 1990. The school campus was a two floor building in a medium-sized plot with a small playground.

== Highlights ==
- The school has blocks for Kindergarten, Primary, High School and College wings.
- It has an Audio-Visual section.
- Jyothy - Sabhangana, the school's indoor auditorium, caters to cultural activities.
- For the fine arts performances, the school has the Jyothy Rangamandira.
- An indoor swimming pool trains students from Class IV to VII free of cost, during school hours.
- The school authorities have tried to limit the strength of each class to about 40 students.There are 4 sections in each standard as section A, B, C & D.
- A hostel facility is available for girl students. The hostel is located adjacent to the school complex. it also has a stage for annual day.

Below it there is under ground sports room

== Pre-primary program ==
- There are 5 sections each in LKG and UKG.
- The school for these students runs half day from 8:15am–12:30pm from Monday to Friday with every Saturday being a holiday.
- Regular events and fun days are held for these students.

== Primary school program ==
The school imparts education to the students of grades 1 - 5, in disciplines such as English, Mathematics, Life Science, Language Studies, Environmental Science and Information Technology.

A continuous assessment has replaced the traditional method of examinations in the primary years programme. In order to remove the tedium of the traditional 'chalk and talk' technique of teaching, group discussions, seminars, and projects have been developed on the lines of the 'do and learn' technique. Yoga, music, craft and other activities are woven into the curriculum framework, in order to expose the children to pursuits other than academics.

== Middle and High School program ==
Yoga is introduced to the children to de-stress them and to help them cope with the pressures of contemporary life.

The institution follows the CBSE pattern for all students up to 10th Standard.

Students are given the choice of Science, Quiz, Theatre, Literary, Art and Dance clubs.
