= Indira Gandhi Institute of Child Health, Bengaluru =

Coordinates: 12.937318°N 77.592016°E

Indira Gandhi Institute of Child Health

Geography
- Location: Bangalore, Karnataka, India

Organisation
- Affiliated university: Rajiv Gandhi University of Health Sciences For Academics

Indira Gandhi Institute of Child Health is a premier organization promoting tertiary level Child Health Care services. It is government-run referral centre for children in Karnataka state, India and it is an autonomous body, registered under the Karnataka Societies Registration Act 1960 and functioning under the control of the Ministry of Medical Education, Government of Karnataka. It is located in Jayanagar 1st Block, Bangalore.

The hospital has 475 beds with Paediatric critical care (35 beds) and Neonatal Intensive Care Unit accredited as Level 3B by NNF, India (National Neonatology Forum) with a strength of 40 beds equipped with ventilation and staff.

The Indira Gandhi Institute of Child Health has a paediatric emergency and critical care service supported by laboratory and blood-bank services.

Indira Gandhi Institute Of Child Health, is the brainchild of Dr.D.G.Benakappa (B.C.Roy awardee) who completed his training in Paediatrics from USA and UK. On his return to Indian shores in the late 1960s, he found a disdainful lack of child health services and worked to improve it, while he worked under various capacities in Mysore, Bengaluru, and Hubli.

He established the Benakappa Children's Trust Hospital, which he handed over to the Government of Karnataka, later to be renamed as Indira Gandhi Institute Of Child Health.

Established in 1991 and expanded in phases, Indira Gandhi Institute Of Child Health was a functional referral hospital by 1995. It has grown over the years as a Paediatric Multi Super-speciality tertiary care hospital.

IGICH now stands as an esteemed institute for postgraduate training in Paediatrics (MD/DCh) and its allied Super-speciality course (MCh-Pediatric Surgery). It also offers fellowship programmes in Paediatric Critical Care, Paediatric Endocrinology, Paediatric Genetics, Paediatric Neurology, Neonatal Intensive Care, Paediatric Dermatology, Paediatric Radiology, Paediatric Orthopedics, Pediatric Urology, Paediatric Anesthesiology and minimally invasive surgery.

== Departments ==
- Paediatric Intensive Care
- Neonatal Intensive Care
- Paediatric Medicine
- Paediatric Surgery
- Paediatric Radiology
- Paediatric Neurology
- Paediatric Genetics
- Paediatric ENT
- Paediatric Endocrinology
- Paediatric Dermatology
- Paediatric Rheumatology
- Paediatric Gastroenterology
- Paediatric Nephrology
- Paediatric Pulmonary Medicine
- Paediatric Orthopaedics
- Paediatric Dentistry
- Paediatric Ophthalmology
- Paediatric Anaesthesiology

.

== Functions ==
- Provide care to Paediatric patients.
- Training of candidates in the speciality of Paediatrics and in the super speciality of Paediatric Surgery.
- Organize scientific meetings, seminars, symposium, workshops in Child Health.
- To take up research programmes relating to diagnosis and treatment of Paediatric ailments.
