= Suddaguntepalya =

- Neighbourhood
- Location within Bengaluru
- Coordinates: 12.9309643°N 77.6049218°E
- Country: India
- State: Karnataka
- Metro: Bangalore

Languages
  - Official: Kannada
- Time zone: UTC+5:30 (IST)
- PIN: 560029
- Vehicle registration: KA-05

Suddaguntepalya, abbreviated as S G Palya is an area located in South Bangalore, off Hosur Road. It is 10 km from Kempegowda Bus Station and Bangalore City Railway Station and 40 km from Bangalore International Airport. The locality is home to various paying guests accommodations and hostels as Christ University is located here. Major organizations and institutions in the area includes Christ University, Dharmaram College, Srinivasa Theatre and a number of restaurants.

== Location ==
SG Palya (Suddaguntepalya) is directly bordered by Koramangala, Tavarekere, Adugodi, and BTM Layout in South Bangalore.

== How to reach S.G Palya ==
METRO: SG palya is 2 kms away from the nearest metro BTM Layout and 5 kms from Jayanagar Metro.

BUS: nearest bus stops are Suddaguntepalya Bus Stop, Ananda Ashrama, or Tavarekere Stop.

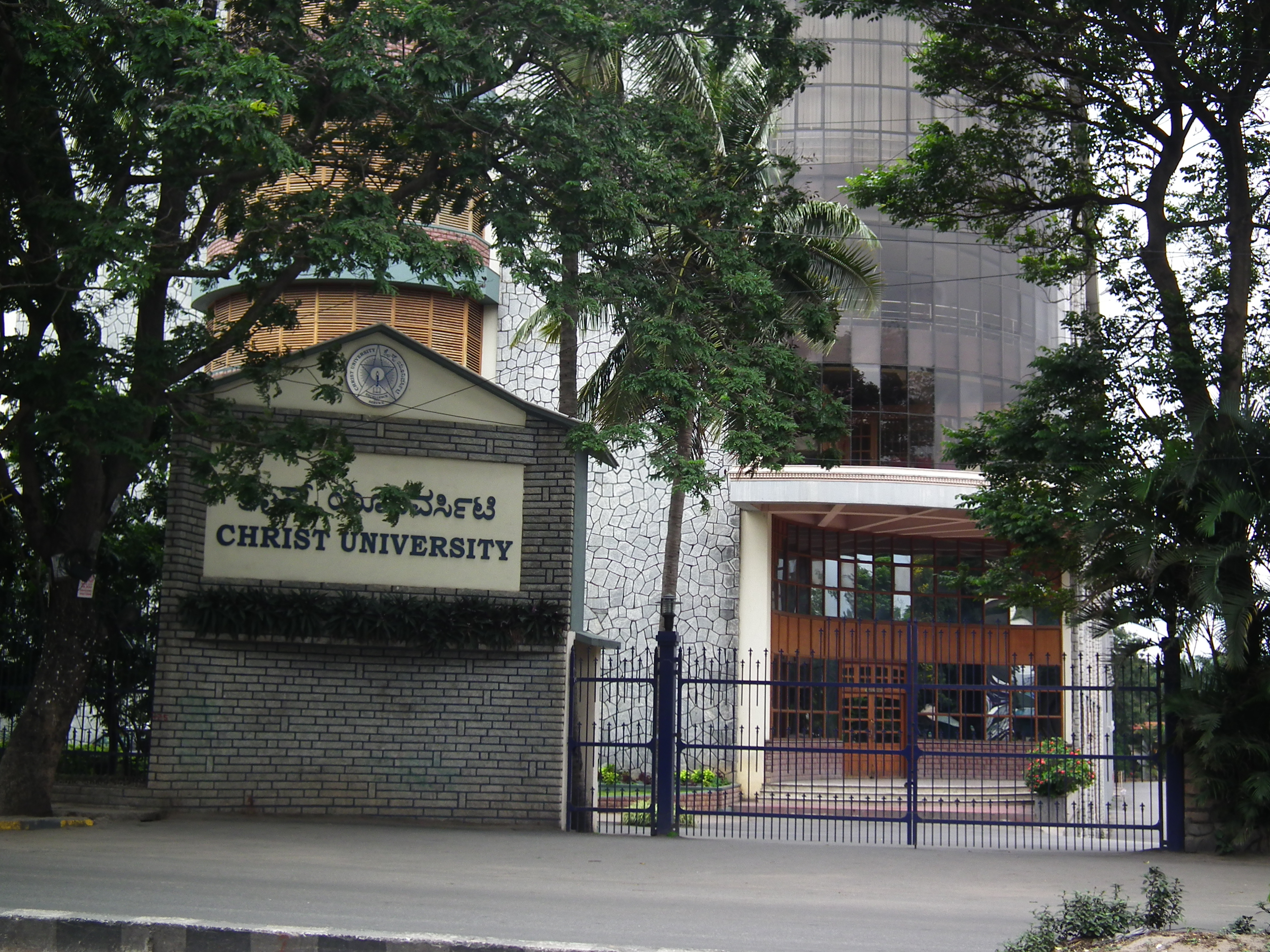
Christ University
