= Sanjay Gandhi Institute of Trauma and Orthopaedics =

Coordinates: 12.9370381°N 77.5930187°E

Geography
- Location: Bangalore, Karnataka, India

Organisation
- Affiliated university: Rajiv Gandhi University of Health Sciences For Academics

History
- Founded: 1984

Links
- Website: www.sgito.org

Sanjay Gandhi Institute of Trauma and Orthopaedics (SGITO) is a government-run autonomous super-specialty hospital and research institute in trauma and orthopaedics. The institute is a regional trauma and orthopedic care center in Karnataka, and is run by the Government of Karnataka. It is located in Bangalore, India. In 2024, SGITO introduced dedicated vascular surgical services, established and led by Dr Siddharth Matad, Associate Professor and General and Vascular Surgeon.

== History ==
The hospital started in 1984 and is now a regional trauma and orthopedic care center in Karnataka state, India. In 2004, the institute started a nursing college. In 2015, it started a sports injury center, the second government hospital in the country to have one after Safdarjung Hospital in Delhi.
