= Anjanapura =

Anjanapura Township
- Neighbourhood
- Lal Bahadur Shastri Nagara
- Location within Karnataka
- Coordinates: 12°51′24″N 77°33′09″E
- Country: India
- State: Karnataka
- Metro: Bengaluru

Languages
  - Official: Kannada
- Time zone: UTC+5:30 (IST)
- PIN: 560108, 560083

Anjanapura Township, officially Lal Bahadur Shastri Nagara is a newly developing neighborhood located in the southern part of the city of Bengaluru. The area is located to the east of Kanakapura Road, north of NICE Road and west of Bannerghatta Road. The southern terminal station of Silk Institute on Green Line of the Namma Metro is the closest station on Kanakapura Road side and the upcoming southern terminal station of Kalena Agrahara on Pink Line of the Namma Metro will be the closest on Bannerghatta Road side. The neighbourhood is considered to be one of the largest layouts developed by BDA in the past decade and was laid out initially into 10 blocks from 1st to 10th, later an 11th Further Extension was added to it, making a total of 11 blocks. Swami Vivekananda Road, Nadaprabhu Kempegowda Road (Anjanapura 80 ft Road), Anjanapura 60 ft Road, Tulasipura Road as some of the important roads in the neighborhood. BMTC Depot-44 connects the neighborhood to different parts of the city through bus transportation. The neighborhood is famous for the Anjanapura inscriptions and hero stones discovered at an old Anjaneya Temple
