= Puttenahalli =

- Suburb
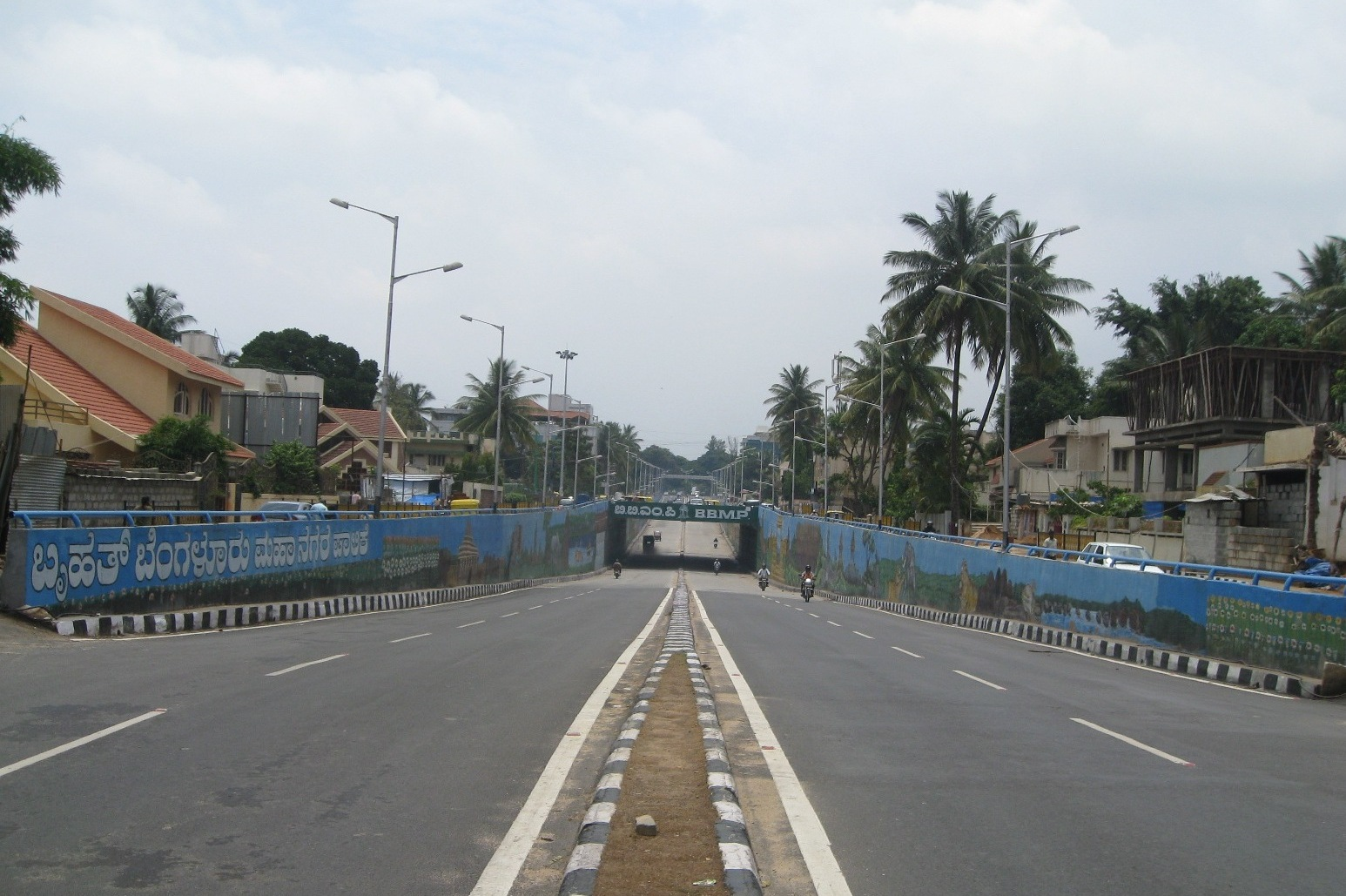
- Outer Ring Road, Puttenahalli

- Location within Bengaluru
- Coordinates: 12°53′45″N 77°34′45″E
- Country: India
- State: Karnataka
- District: Bangalore Urban

Languages
  - Official: Kannada
- Time zone: UTC+5:30 (IST)
- Postal code: ५६००७८

Puttenahalli is a suburban area in Bangalore, Karnataka State in India.

Uninfluenced by its neighbouring town Bangalore's growth to a metropolitan city, Puttanahalli remained as a rural area until the 1970s. But because of the increasing expansion of Bangalore, the place has urbanised significantly with many housing projects. There are restaurants, many fresh vegetable shops, almost all bank ATM counters, schools, small temples, parks, large play ground. Public transportation is provided there are frequent BMTC buses running the nearest metro station is at Yechenahalli nearly 2 to 3 km away.

== Geography ==
Puttanahalli is located about 8 kilometres (5.0 mi) south of Bangalore city centre. Puttanahalli has 2 major lakes, one of which is Puttenahalli Lake (located to the south of the place). Both the lakes now are severely under the threat of encroachment and disposal of wastes of all kinds. The Sarakki Lake which has an official expanse of 84 Acres is amongst the larger lakes in Bangalore. The massive encroachment of this lake and the inaction by concerned authorities promoted the People's Campaign for Right to Water to take up the issue in Court. After a long hearing, the High Court of Karnataka passed a judgement in August 2014 holding the authorities responsible for the encroachment and ordered for all the 133 encroachments to be removed. The removal of encroachments is yet to happen.

To the south are Puttenahalli Paalya, Elita Promenade, Brigade Gardenia and Brigade Millennium. Further to the south are Nataraja Layout and RBI Layout.

=== Climate ===
Puttenhalli experiences a tropical savanna climate (Köppen climate classification Aw) with distinct wet and dry seasons.

== Puttenahalli Village ==
The Puttenahalli in South Bangalore which is part of JP Nagar phases 6 and 7 is often confused with Puttanahalli in North Bangalore which is next to Yelahanka Town on the way to Kempegowda International Airport.

In Puttanahalli, a small area in the middle still has a traditional rural population who follow its agricultural traditions. This place is generally referred by local people as Puttanahalli Village.

The estimated population of Puttanahalli Village is around 230. Majority of the population belongs to the Hindu religion. Their faith plays a significant role in the structure of their society and its influences can be seen in its homes. Some houses are painted in bright blue colour and has got illustrations and murals of gods. There is also a temple in the village.

Around 30% of the families in this settlement live in poverty. Considering their economic status, electricity is subsidised for them. Water is made available to the houses through pipelines.

The economic and non-economic activities people engage in include home making, cattle rearing, pottery, book making, construction workers, auto driving, working on construction sites, doing minor businesses etc. Every child in this village is sent to school.

When Bangalore expanded into Puttanahalli, Puttanahalli Village adapted to the changing environment an entirely different way. They continued agriculture and cattle rearing, and of the two cattle rearing is still a profession here today. It got its own vernacular architecture and minor traditions in relatively short period of time.

It has remained a predominantly poor community because of its low economic status and poor public infrastructure, but they have been receiving aid from the government for house construction and development of public amenities. Due to the aid received from the government for making houses, the villagers could finally settle down in permanent houses and thus the area became a permanent settlement. But since people of this area could no longer engage in agricultural activities due increasing land prices, many opted for jobs in the town.

== Waste & drainage threat ==
The government recently reacted to the urgent call for the development of Puttanahalli's drainage by announcing an expenditure of 2 cores on the improvement of drainages. The condition of two important lakes of Puttanhalli is on a dismal state. Wastes of organic and inorganic kinds are being thrown into these lakes, encouraging mosquitoes to breed.
