= Yelachenahalli =

- Suburb
- Location within Bengaluru
- Coordinates: 12°53′45″N 77°34′45″E
- Country: India
- State: Karnataka
- District: Bangalore Urban

Languages
  - Official: Kannada
- Time zone: UTC+5:30 (IST)

Yelachenahalli is a municipal area (halli means "village" in Kannada) on Kanakpura Road, Bangalore, but has fast developed into a hub of development with malls and high rise buildings. Over the last few years, this area has transformed itself into an extension to the IT city. It is very near to JP Nagara, approx 10 km from MG Road, 15 km from Electronic city.

The village was called as Elajeeyaraha Halli in the 14th Century.
