= Gopalpur =

Gopalpur (Hindi/Bengali/Oriya) or Gopalapuram (Telugu/Tamil/Malayalam) may refer to:

== Bangladesh ==
- Gopalpur Upazila, a sub-district of Tangail District, Dhaka Division
  - Gopalpur, Tangail, Bangladesh, a town which is the seat of that sub-district (upazila)
- Gopalpur, Lalpur Upazila, a village which is the seat of Lalpur Upazila, a sub-district (upazila) of Natore District, Rajshahi Division
  - See also the Gopalpur massacre by the Pakistan Army during the Bangladesh liberation war of 1971
- Several villages in Jhalokati District, Barisal Division:
  - Gopalpur, Jhalakati
  - Pār Gopālpur
  - Chhota Gopālpur
- Gopalpur, Pirojpur, a village in Pirojpur District, Barisal Division

== India ==
- in Andhra Pradesh:
  - Gopalapuram, West Godavari, a village and a Grama Panchayat in West Godavari district
  - Dandu Gopalapuram, a village and a Grama Panchayat in Santha Bommali mandal, Srikakulam district
- in Bihar:
  - Gopalpur, Gopalganj, a village in Gopalganj district
    - Gopalpur, Bihar Assembly constituency
    - Gopalpur (community development block), a community development block in Bhagalpur district of Bihar
- in Himachal Pradesh:
  - Gopalpur, Himachal Pradesh, a village in Kangra district
- in Karnataka:
  - Gopalpur, Yadgir, a village in Yadgir taluk, Yadgir district
- in Odisha:
  - Gopalpur, Odisha, a town and a notified area council in Ganjam district (southern part of the state)
    - Gopalpur, Odisha Assembly constituency
  - Gopalpur Tussar Fabrics
- in Tamil Nadu:
  - Gopalapuram, Chennai, a village in Chennai district
  - Gopalapuram, Thanjavur, a village in Thanjavur district
- in Telangana:
  - Gopalpur, Karimnagar
- in Uttar Pradesh:
  - Gopalpur, Uttar Pradesh Assembly constituency
  - Gopalpur, Dih, Raebareli (census code 145312)
- in West Bengal:
  - Gopalpur, Nadia, a census town in Ranaghat subdivision, Nadia district
  - Gopalpur, Paschim Bardhaman, a census town in Durgapur subdivision, in Paschim Bardhaman district
  - Gopalpur, Chanditala-I, a village in Srirampore subdivision, in Hooghly district
  - Gopalpur, Dakshin Dinajpur, a census town in Gangrampur subdivision, in Dakshin Dinajpur district

== Nepal ==
- Gopalpur, Nepal, a village development committee in Dhanusa district, Janakpur zone, Central region, Nepal

== People ==
- Gopalapuram Parthasarathy, an Indian diplomat and author

== See also ==
- Gopalpur Assembly constituency (disambiguation)
- Gopalapuram (disambiguation)
- Gopalganj (disambiguation)
- Gopalpura, village in Rajasthan, India
- Gopalpura metro station, Jaipur, India
