= Katigenahalli inscription and hero stone =

Inscription on standing stone in Katigenahalli, India.

Katigenahalli 1348CE Donation Inscription
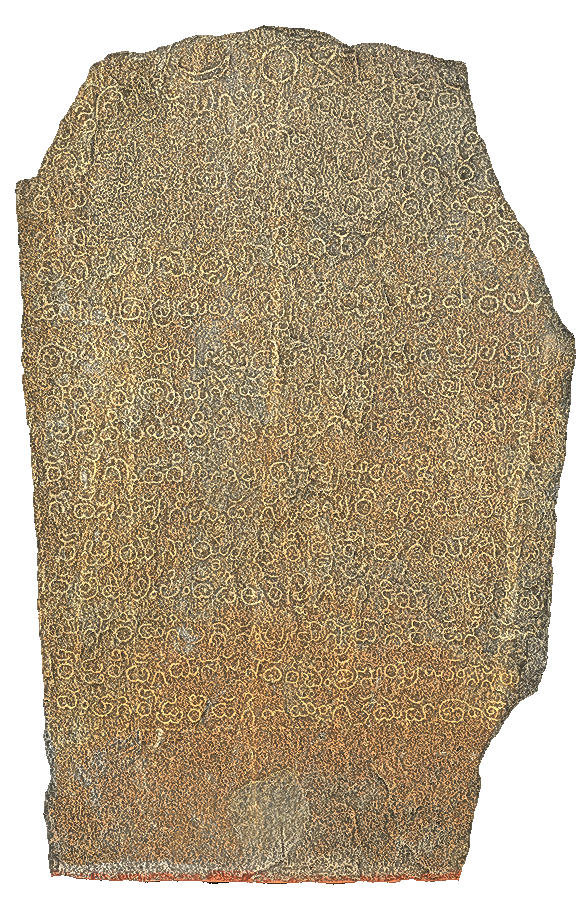
- Digital Image of the Katigenahalli 1348CE Donation Inscription.png
- Material: Stone
- Height: 177 cm (70 in)
- Width: 115 cm (45 in)
- Writing: Kannada
- Created: 1 December 1348 (677 years ago)
- Discovered: 1902
- Discovered by: B L Rice
- Present location: 12.97503°N 77.59567°E
- Language: Kannada
- https://mythicsociety.github.io/AksharaBhandara/#/learn/Shasanagalu?id=115051

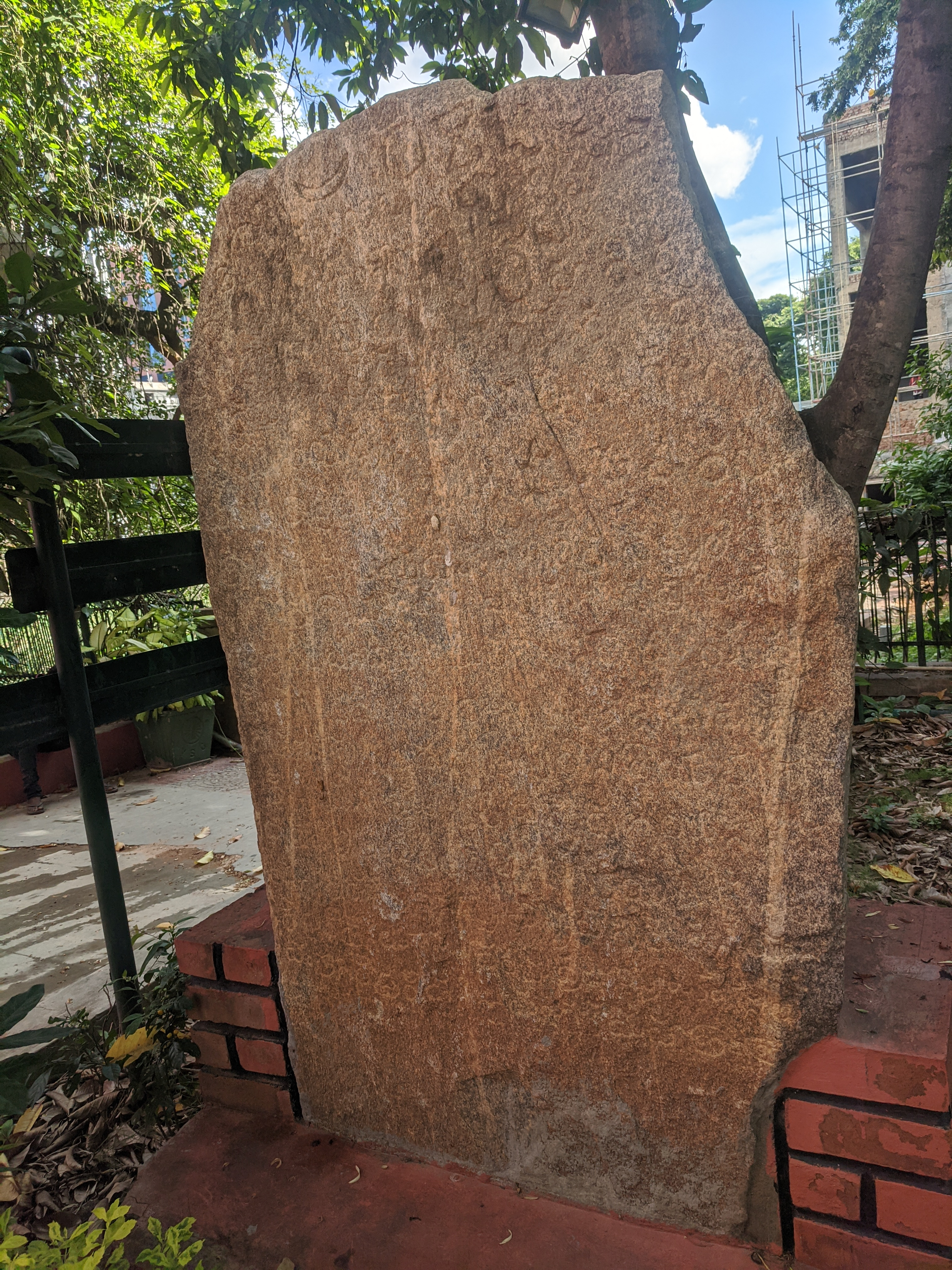
Katigenahalli 1348CE Donation Inscription in 2024. Picture Courtesy: Wikimedia Commons

The Katigenahalli inscription and hero stone is a passage of Kannada text inscribed on a standing stone discovered in Kattigenahalli, a locality in northern Bengaluru, India, near Yelahanka. The stone has been dated to the 14th century CE and the inscription on it is the first documentation of the name Kattigenahalli. More generally, hero stones are memorial stones commemorating the honourable death of a hero in battle, and are located all over India.

Due to the deteriorating condition of the inscription, reported to government officials in 2017, the stone was moved to the Government Museum, Bengaluru.

== Dating and significance ==
The inscription includes the text "śakābda 1271nĕya sarvvadha . . . .da mārggasira su 10 so" in Kannada script, enabling it to be precisely dated to Monday, 1 December 1348 CE (Julian calendar). This was during the reign of kings Harihara and Bukka of the Karnata Empire, also known as the Vijayanagara Empire. At this time the kingdom was divided into many administrative units called naadus, each presided over by a chief of the naadu, called a naadaprabhu, as well as feudatory chiefs called samantadhipati or savantadhipati, with the latter spelling used in the inscription.

The inscription records the donations of the village of Kattigenahalli to Kacheyanayka, son of Bairisetti, by the savantadhipati Mahasavatadhipati Maileyanayka and the naadaprabhus of Yelakka (modern-day Yelahanka), namely Bairideva, Macideva, Maragonda, Tamiyappa, Kanagonda, Devanna, Allalajiya, and other gavundas, i.e. village leaders. The names of most of the persons mentioned in the inscription also occur in the Ganigarahalli inscription documented in Epigraphia Carnatica (Vol 9, BN 24).

The inscription mentions that the donations are sarbamaanya, which in the alternative spelling of sarvamaanya can be broken down into sarva (all) and maanya (exempt), meaning that all the revenues were exempt from taxation.

== Physical characteristics ==
The inscription is 177 cm tall and 115 cm wide. The Kannada characters are 4.5 cm tall, 4.4 cm wide, and a very shallow 0.25 cm deep.

== Transliteration of the text ==
The inscription was first documented and a transliteration published in Epigraphia Carnatica Vol. 9 as Devanahalli Inscription No. 50. The text below is a rereading of the inscription in Kannada and IAST that was published in the Mythic Society journal.

(The line numbers are not part of the original inscription - including them is a default practice with inscriptions.)

Line Number	Kannada	IAST
1	. ಸ್ತಿ ಶ್ರೀ ಶಕಾಬ್ದ ೧೨೭೧ನೆಯ ಸರ್ವ್ವಧ . . . . .	. sti śrī śakābda 1271nĕya sarvvadha . . . .
2	.ದ ಮಾರ್ಗ್ಗಸಿರ ಸು ೧೦ ಸೋ ಶ್ರೀ ಮನು ಮಹಾಮಂಡ . . .	da mārggasira su 10 so śrī manu mahāmaṃḍa
3	ರ ಚತುಸಮುದ್ರಧಿಪತಿ ಹರಿರಾ . .	ra catusamudradhipati harirā . .
4	ಭಾಡ ಭಾಸೆಗೆ ತಪ್ಪುವ ರಾಯರ ಗಂಡ .	bhāḍa bhāsĕgĕ tappuva rāyara gaṃḍa
5	ವೀರ ಹರಿಯಪ್ಪ ವೊಡೆಯರು ಬುಕ್ಕಂಣ .	vīra hariyappa vŏḍĕyaru bukkaṃṇa .
6	ಡೆಯರು ಶ್ರೀ ಪ್ರಿತ್ತುವಿ. ರಾಜ್ಯಂಗೆಯುತ್ತಮಿರಲು	ḍĕyaru śrī prittuvi rājyaṃgĕyuttamiralu
7	ಶ್ರೀ ಮನು ಮಹ ಸವಂತಾಧಿಪತಿ . . . ಕಗಂಡ ಮೈಲೆಯ	śrī manu maha savaṃtādhipati . . . kagaṃḍa mailĕya
8	ನಯ್ಕರು ಶ್ರೀ ಮನು ಮಹ ಎಲಕ್ಕನಾಡ ಪ್ರಬುಗಳು	naykaru śrī manu maha ĕlakkanāḍa prabugalu
9	ಬೈರಿದೇವ ಮಾಚ್ಚಿದೇವ ಮರಗೊಂಡ ತಾಮಿಯಪ್ಪ	bairideva māccideva maragŏṃḍa tāmiyappa
10	ಕಂನಗೊಂಡ ದೇವಂಣ ಬೈಂ . ಪ್ಪ ಆಲ್ಲಾಳಜೀಯರು ವೊಳ	kaṃnagŏṃḍa devaṃṇa baiṃ . ppa āllālajīyaru ̤ vŏla
11	ಗಾದ ಸಮಸ್ತ ಗೌಉಂಡುಗಳು ಆ ಬೈರಿಸೆಟ್ಟಿಯ ಮಗ	gāda samasta gauuṃḍugalu ā bairisĕṭṭiya maga
12	ಕಚ್ಚೆಯನಾಯ್ಕಂಗೆ ಕೊಟ್ಟಕೊಡಗೆಯ ಸಾಸನ	kaccĕyanāykaṃgĕ kŏṭṭakŏḍagĕya sāsana
13	ದ ಕ್ರಮವೆಂತೆಂದಡೆ ಅ ಕಟ್ಟಿಗೆಹಳ್ಳಿಯ ಚತ್ತುಸೀಮೆ	da kramavĕṃtĕṃdaḍĕ a kaṭṭigĕhall̤iya ca ̤ ttusīmĕ
14	ಯನು ಕೊಡಗೆಆಗಿ ಸರ್ಬ್ಬಮಾನ್ಯವಾಗಿ ಕೊಡಗೆಯಾಗಿ	yanu kŏḍagĕāgi sarbbamānyavāgi kŏḍagĕyāgi
15	ಕೊಟ್ಟ ಕೊಡಗೆಯ ಸಾಸನ ಧರೆ ಚಂದ್ರಸೂರ್ಯ್ಯ ಉಳಂನ ಸಲು	kŏṭṭa kŏḍagĕya sāsana dharĕ caṃdrasūryya ulaṃna salu
16	ವಂತಾಗಿ ಕೊಟ್ಟಕೊಡಗೆ . ಮಂಗಳ ಮಹಶ್ರೀ ಶ್ರೀ	vaṃtāgi kŏṭṭakŏḍagĕ . maṃgala ma ̤ haśrī śrī

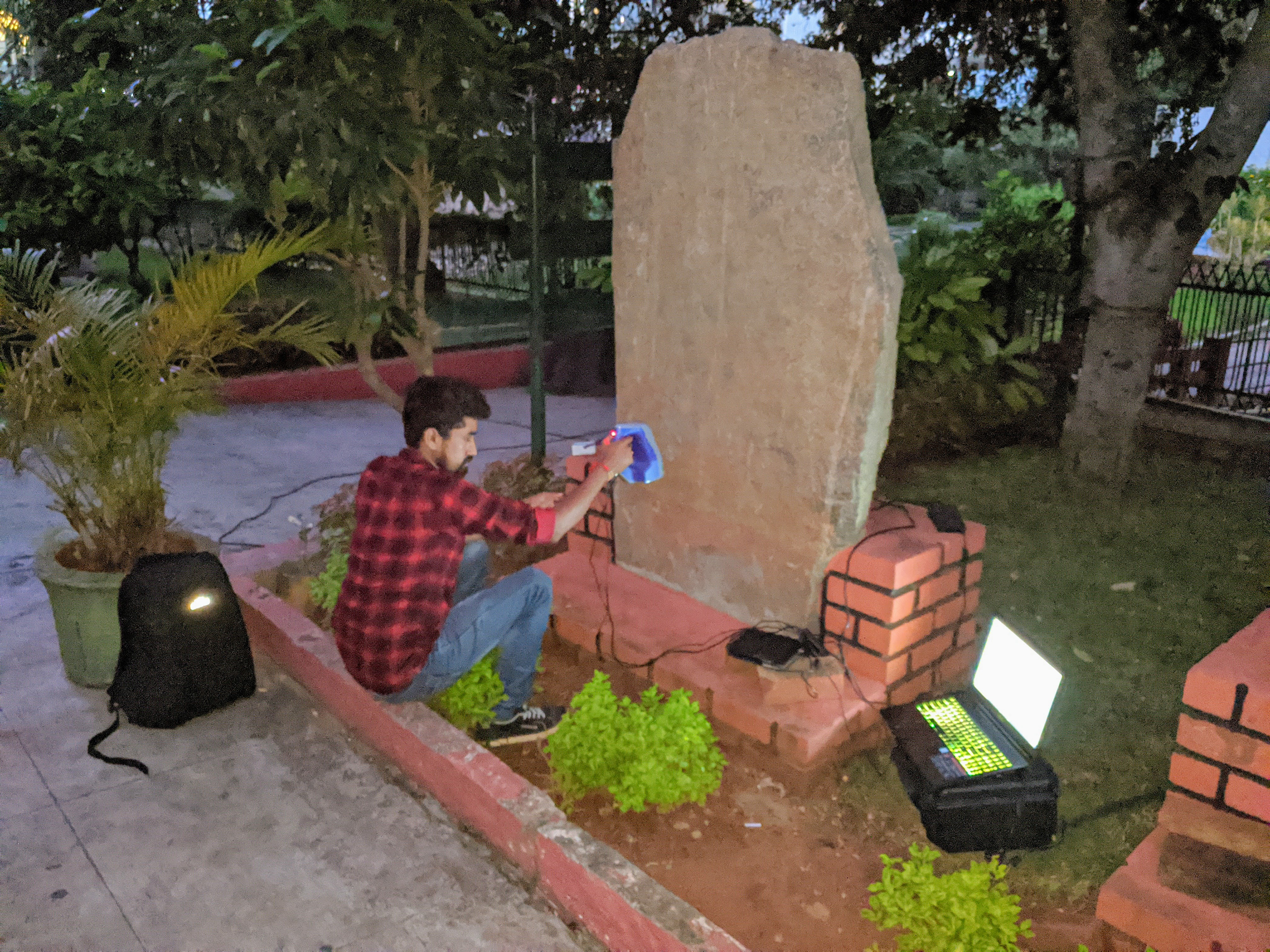
3D Scanning of the Katigenahalli 1348CE Donation Inscription. Picture Courtesy: Wikimedia Commons

== Translation in English ==
The text has been published in Epigraphia Carnatica. It reads as follows:

"Be it well. (On the date specified), when the maha-mandalesvara, master of the four oceans, subduer of hostile kings, champion over kings who break their word, vira-Hariyappa-Vodeyar Bukkanna-Vodeyar was ruling the kingdom of the world :— the maha-samantadhipati .... Maileya-Nayaka, the great Elakka-nad prabhu Bairi-Deva, and others (named), with all the farmers, granted to Bairi-Setti's son Kariya-Nayaka the Kodigehalli village as a sarbbamanya-kodage for as long as sun and moon endure".

== See also ==
- Byadarahalli inscription and hero stone
- Domlur inscriptions and hero stones
