= Gopalapuram =

Gopalapuram may refer to these places in India:

- Gopalapuram, Chennai, Tamil Nadu
- Gopalapuram, Ravulapalem Mandal, Andhra Pradesh
- Gopalapuram, Thanjavur, Tamil Nadu
- Gopalapuram, Warangal, Telangana
- Gopalapuram, West Godavari, Andhra Pradesh
  - Gopalapuram mandal, West Godavari
  - Gopalapuram (Assembly constituency), West Godavari

== See also ==
- Gopalpur (disambiguation)
