= Byadarahalli inscription and hero stone =

Inscription on standing stone in Bhyadarahalli, India

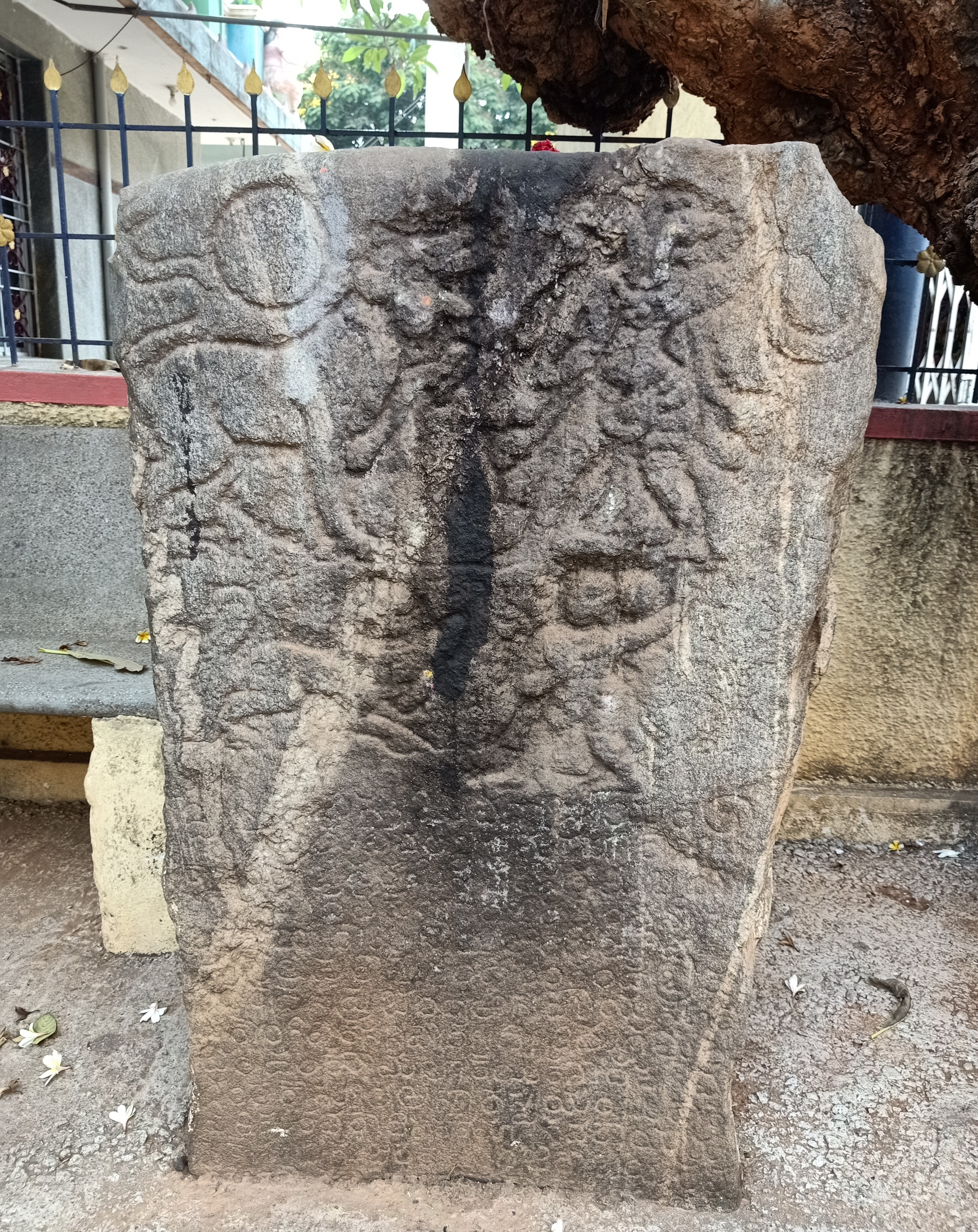
Byadarahalli Inscription and Hero Stone - Front Side

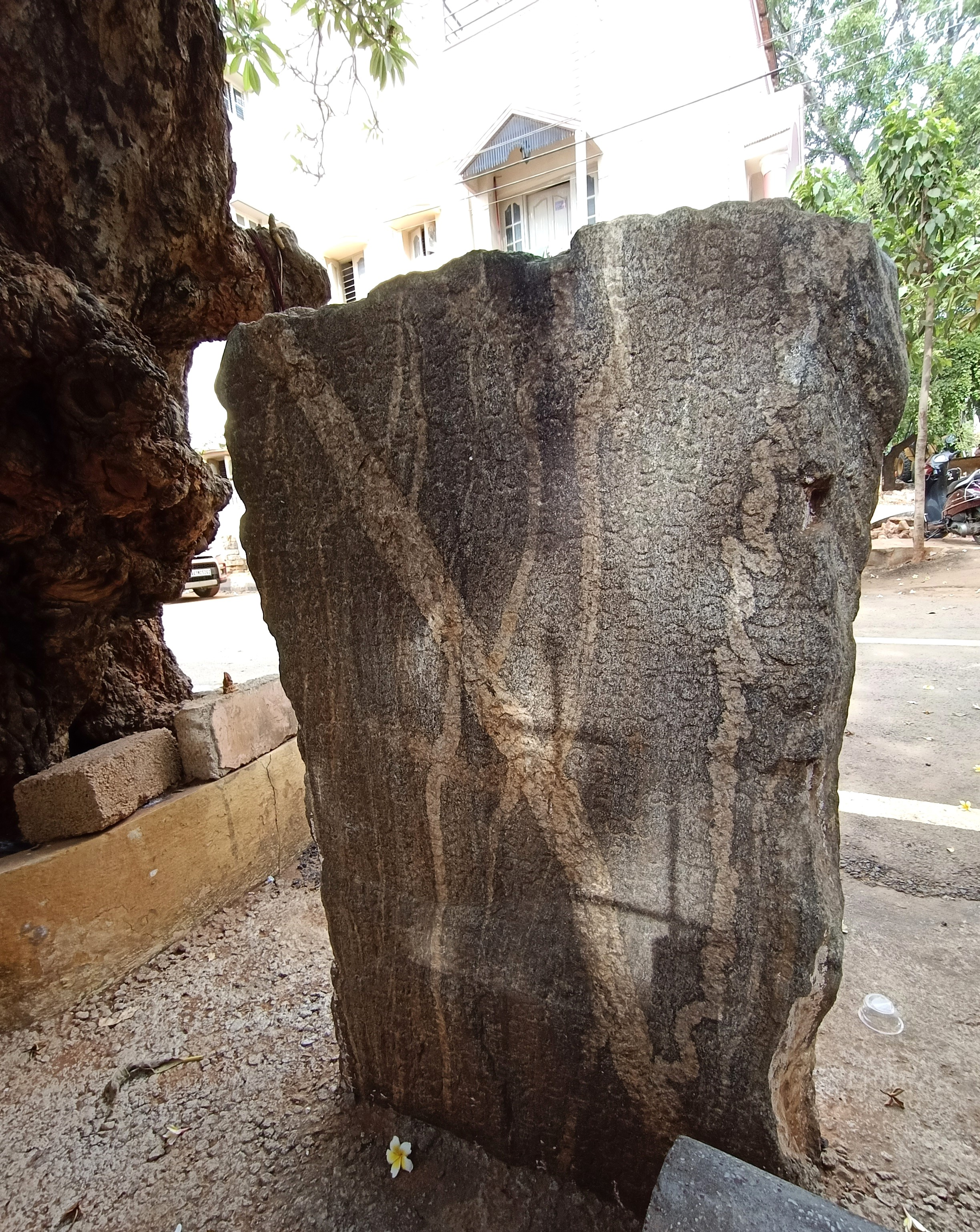
Byadarahalli Inscription and Hero Stone - Back Side

The Byadarahalli inscription and hero stone is a passage of Kannada text inscribed on a standing stone situated in Byadarahalli, a locality in the Herohalli ward of Bengaluru, India, off Magadi Main Road. More generally, hero stones are memorial stones commemorating the honourable death of a hero in battle, and are located all over India.

The Byadarahalli hero stone has been dated to the 14th century CE, and the inscription on it features a unique engraving of the Gandabherunda, a mythical bird in Indian iconography and the only known example in the Bengaluru region. The stone is currently located on the footpath outside the Mahadevamma Temple in Byadarahalli.

== Physical characteristics ==
Byadarahalli Hero Stone
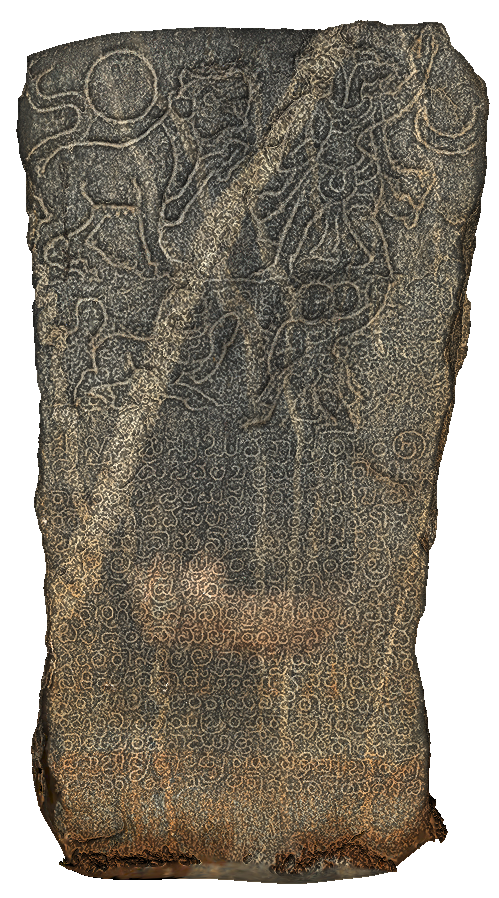
- Digital Image of the Byadarahalli Hero Stone - Front Side

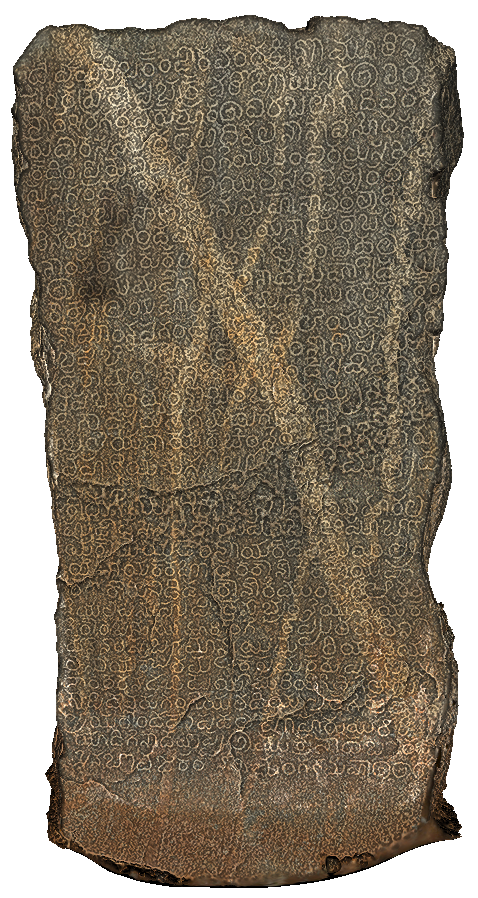
- Digital Image of the Byadarahalli Hero Stone - Back Side
- Material: Stone
- Height: 159 cm (63 in)
- Width: 77 cm (30 in)
- Writing: Kannada
- Created: 29 January 1336 (690 years ago)
- Discovered: 1902
- Discovered by: B L Rice
- Present location: 12.982667°N 77.484083°E
- Language: Kannada
- https://mythicsociety.github.io/AksharaBhandara/#/learn/Shasanagalu?id=7558614

The inscription is 159 cm tall and 77 cm wide. The Kannada characters are approximately 4 cm tall, 3 cm wide, and 0.21 cm deep.

The front side of the stone bears an engraving of the mythical bird Gandabherunda fighting a tiger (the royal emblem of the Hoysalas), and below that, an engraving of a warrior fighting a tiger. The image of Gandabherunda gained prominence when it was adopted as the royal insignia of the Mysuru Wodeyars (also spelt Wadiyars of Mysore), a family of Mysore maharajas from the Urs clan who assumed the title Wodeyar, meaning ‘Lord’ in Kannada. The Gandabherunda was subsequently adopted as the official symbol of the Karnataka state government.

The stone also bears an engraving of the sun and moon, signifying the infallibility of the grant mentioned in the inscription.

== Places mentioned in the inscription ==
The inscription mentions Haruvahalli, a locality approximately one km north-northeast of Byadarahalli known today as Herohalli, where the stone is located. The name Haruvahalli can be broken up into its constituent parts of haruva and halli, and like the terms agrahara and mangala, haruva was used to denote places where brahmins stayed. Therefore Haruvahalli can be understood to have been a place where brahmins lived.

Kukkala Naadu was an administrative division mentioned in the inscription that existed from the 8th to the 16th centuries CE, and has been referred to by various other names including Kukanare Naadu, Kukanur Naadu, and Kukala Naadu. The name is likely derived from the region's rugged geological features and its abundance of small ponds and lakes. This administrative division is mentioned in at least six other hero stone inscriptions, including those in Ramasamudra, Haligevadeyarahalli, Kyatamranhalli, and Bommavara in Bengaluru taluk (local administrative unit), as well as in Manthalu, Banasvadi, and Huralichikkanahalli in Nelamangala taluk.

The village of Kittanelli mentioned in the inscription was located roughly seven kilometres northwest of Byadarahalli in the Kukkala Naadu administrative division, and exists to this day.

== Dating and significance of inscription ==
The Byadarahalli hero stone and its inscription were identified during field surveys based on information in the Epigraphia Carnatica Vol 9 of 1905. The inscription includes the text "sakhavarusa saṃda 1252 yiva saṃvatsarada māgha ba 1 so" in Kannada script, enabling it to be precisely dated to Monday, 29 January 1336 CE (Julian calendar).

The inscription itself is composed of 48 lines of text, in three sections.

=== First section ===
The first 18 lines of the inscription are devoted to the prashasthi (meaning praise or celebration) of the Hoysala king Veera Ballala III, and contain a wealth of information about him, including the following birudavali (series of honorary titles conferred on the king):

Kannada	IAST
ಮಹಾರಾಜಾಧಿ ರಾಜಂ ರಾಜಪರಮೇಸ್ವರಂ ಪರಮಬಟಾರಕಂ ಯಾದವ ಕುಲಾಂಬರ ದ್ವಿಂಮ್ಮಣಿ ಸರ್ಬ್ಬಗ್ನ ಚೂಡಾಮಣಿ ಮಲೆರಾಜ ಮಲಪರೊಳು ರಂಡರಂ ಗಂಡ ಬೇರುಂಡ ಕದನ ಪ್ರಚಂಡ ಆಸಹಾಯ ಸೂರ ಏಕಾಂಗಿ ವೀರ ಸನಿವಾರ ಸಿಧಿ ಗಿರಿದುಗ ಮಲ್ಲ ಚಲದಂಕರಾಮ ಲೋಕಯಿಕನಾಥ ಪಗೆವಗಂಠಕಾಸೂಲ ಅನ್ವಾಥ ಸ್ವಯಂಬು ದಾರವಥಿಪುರವರಾಧೀಸ್ವರಂ ಮಾಳವರಾಯ ಮಸ್ತಕಾ ಸೂಲ ಗೂರ್ಜರರಾಯ ವಜೀರಾ ಬಯಿರವಅಂ ಹೆಂಮಿರರಾಯ ಬ್ರಂಹ್ಮರಾಕ್ಷಸಂ ಆದವರಾಯ ಬಂಜನಾಮೂರ್ತ್ತಿ ಚೋಳರಾಯ ಸ್ತಾಪನಾ ಚಾಡ್ಯ ಪಾಂಡ್ಯರಾಯ ಪತಿಷ್ಟಾಚಾರ್ಯ್ಯ ಮಗರರಾಯ ನಿಮ್ಮೂಲ ಕಾಡವರಾಯ ದಿಸಿಪಟ ವಯಿರಿಬ ಕಂಟೀರವಂ ದಕ್ಷಿಣಾಮೂರ್ತಿ ನಿಸಂಕ ಪ್ರತಾಪ ಚಕ್ರವರ್ತಿ ಹೊಯಿಸಳ ಶ್ರೀ ವೀರನಾರಸಿಂಗದೇವ ಕುಮಾರ ಶ್ರೀವೀರ ಬಲ್ಲಾಳ ದಿವರಸ	mahārājādhi rājaṃ rājaparamesvaraṃ paramabaṭārakaṃ yādava kulāṃbara dviṃmmaṇi sarbbagna cūḍāmaṇi malĕrāja malaparŏlu ̤ raṃḍaraṃ gaṃḍa beruṃḍa kadana pracaṃḍa āsahāya sūra ekāṃgi vīra sanivāra sidhi giriduga malla caladaṃkarāma lokayikanātha pagĕvagaṃṭhakāsūla anvātha svayaṃbu dāravathipuravarādhīsvaraṃ mālavarāya mastakā sūla gūrjararāya vajīrā bayiravaṃ hĕṃmirarāya braṃhmarākṣasaṃ ādava rāya baṃjanāmūrtti colarāya stāpanā cāḍya pāṃḍyarāya patiṣṭācāryya magararāya nimmūla kāḍavarāya dissipaṭa vayiriba kaṃṭīravaṃ dakṣiṇāmūrti nisaṃka pratāpa cakravarti hŏyisala śrī vīranārasiṃgadeva kumāra śrīvīra ballāla̤ divarasa

=== Second section ===
The second section of the inscription records a generous tax-free grant made to the brothers Mayileyanayakka and Cheneyakka in the presence of the gavundas (village leaders) of Haruvahalli, namely Bommanna, Barachirayya, and others. Mayileyanayakka and Cheneyakka served as chieftains of Kukal Naadu, having inherited the rule of the region from their father, Kadeyanayaka. The inscription mentions various taxes of an unclear nature that are also assigned to Mayileyanayaka and Channeyanayaka, although the specific reason for singling those taxes out remains unclear.

The donation was made by a group of nine sons of Honnagavuda, a resident of the village of Kittanelli in the administrative region of Kukkala Naadu during the reign of the Hoysala King Veera Ballala III, namely: Chikkanna, Honnappa, Gantegavuda, Maleyapa, Manchapa, Chikkahonnappa, Chokkanna, Gopagavuda, and Ramanna. This section of the inscription also mentions Naada Senabhova Jakkana as a witness to this significant act.

The inscription's colloquial language and orthographic quirks make it challenging to discern why the proceeds from a location already within the bounds of Kukala Naadu are being donated back to the rulers of Kukala Naadu.

=== Third section ===
The third section of the inscription has final imprecatory verses called the shapashaya, a common format in Kannada inscriptions intended to sanctify the inscription and prevent it from being harmed by people. The shapashaya in the Byadarahalli inscription states that any individual who fails to honor the donation documented on the stone will incur demerits equivalent to committing the grave act of killing a kapile (an orange-brown sacred cow) on the banks of the sacred Ganga River. According to the Garuda Purana, the act of killing a cow is believed to result in the rebirth of the killer as a hunchback in their next incarnation.

== Transcription of the text ==
The text below is a rereading of the inscription in Kannada and IAST that was published in the Mythic Society journal.

(The line numbers are not part of the original inscription - including them is a default practice with inscriptions.)

Line Number	Kannada	IAST
	ಮುಂಭಾಗ	Frontside
1	ಸ್ವಸ್ತಿ ಸಮಸ್ತ ಬುವನಾಸ್ರಯಂ ಶ್ರೀ	svasti samasta buvanāsrayaṃ śrī
2	ಪ್ರಿಥುವಿ ವಲಬಂ ಮಹಾರಾಜಾಧಿ	prithuvi valabaṃ mahārājādhi
3	ರಾಜಂ ರಾಜಪರಮೇಸ್ವರಂ ಪರಮಬಟಾ	rājaṃ rājaparamesvaraṃ paramabaṭā
4	ರಕಂ ಯಾದವ ಕುಲಾಂಬರ ದ್ವಿಂಮ್ಮಣಿ ಸ	rakaṃ yādava ku ̤ lāṃbara dviṃmmaṇi sa
5	ರ್ಬ್ಬಗ್ನ ಚೂಡಾಮಣಿ ಮಲೆರಾಜ ಮ	rbbagna cūḍāmaṇi malĕrāja ma
6	ಲಪರೊಳು ರಂಡರಂ ಗಂಡ ಬೇರು	laparŏlu ̤ raṃḍaraṃ gaṃḍa beru
7	ಂಡ ಕದನ ಪ್ರಚಂಡ ಆಸಹಾಯ ಸೂರ	ṃḍa kadana pracaṃḍa āsahāya sūra
8	ಏಕಾಂಗಿ ವೀರ ಸನಿವಾರ ಸಿಧಿ ಗಿರಿದುಗ ಮಲ್ಲ	ekāṃgi vīra sanivāra sidhi giriduga malla
9	ಚಲದಂಕರಾಮ ಲೋಕಯಿಕನಾಥ ಪಗೆವ	caladaṃkarāma lokayikanātha pagĕva
10	ಗಂಠಕಾಸೂಲ ಅನ್ವಾಥ ಸ್ವಯಂಬು ದಾರ	gaṃṭhakāsūla anvātha svayaṃbu dāra
11	ವಥಿಪುರವರಾಧೀಸ್ವರಂ ಮಾಳವರಾಯ ಮ	vathipuravarādhīsvaraṃ mālavarāya m
12	ಸ್ತಕಾ ಸೂಲ ಗೂರ್ಜರರಾಯ ವಜೀರಾ ಬಯಿರವ	stakā sūla gūrjararāya vajīrā bayirava
13	ಅಂ ಹೆಂಮಿರರಾಯ ಬ್ರಂಹ್ಮರಾಕ್ಷಸಂ ಆದವ	ṃ hĕṃmirarāya braṃhmarākṣasaṃ ādava
14	ರಾಯ ಬಂಜನಾಮೂರ್ತ್ತಿ ಚೋಳರಾಯ ಸ್ತಾ	rāya baṃjanāmū ̤ rtti colarāya stā
15	ಪನಾ ಚಾಡ್ಯ ಪಾಂಡ್ಯರಾಯ ಪತಿಷ್ಟಾಚಾರ್ಯ್ಯ	panā cāḍya pāṃḍyarāya patiṣṭācāryya
16	ಮಗರರಾಯ ನಿಮ್ಮೂಲ ಕಾಡವರಾಯ ದಿಸಿಪ	magararāya nimmūla kāḍavarāya dissipa
	ಹಿಂಭಾಗ	Backside
17	ಟ ವಯಿರಿಬ ಕಂಟೀರವಂ ದಕ್ಷಿಣಾಮೂರ್ತಿ ನಿ	ṭa vayiriba kaṃṭīravaṃ dakṣiṇāmūrti ni
18	ಸಂಕ ಪ್ರತಾಪ ಚಕ್ರವರ್ತಿ ಹೊಯಿಸಳ ಶ್ರೀ ವೀರ	saṃka pratāpa cakravarti hŏyisala śrī vīra
19	ನಾರಸಿಂಗದೇವ ಕುಮಾರ ಶ್ರೀವೀರ ಬಲ್ಲಾಳ ದಿವರಸ	nārasiṃgadeva kumāra śrīvīra ballāla̤ divarasa
20	ರು ದೋರಸಮುದ್ರದ ಬೀಡಿನಲಿ ನಾನಾ ವಿನೋದ ಸು	ru dorasamudrada bīḍinali nānā vinoda su
21	ಕದಿಂ ಪ್ರಿತುವಿ ರಾಜ್ಯಂಗೆಯುತಂವಿರಲು ಸಖವ	kadiṃ prituvi rājyaṃgĕyutaṃviralu sakhava
22	ರುಸ ಸಂದ ೧೨೫೨ ಯಿವ ಸಂವತ್ಸರದ	rusa saṃda 1252 yiva saṃvatsarada
23	ಮಾಘ ಬ ೧ ಸೋ ಶ್ರೀಮನು ಮಹಾ ಸಾವಂತಾಧಿಪ	māgha ba 1 so śrīmanu mahā sāvaṃtādhipa
24	ತಿ ನರಲೋಕ ಗಂಡ ಮಯಿಲೆಯ ನಾಯಕ ಚಂನೆಯ	ti naraloka gaṃḍa mayilĕya nāyaka caṃnĕya
25	ನಾಯಕರು ಕುಕ್ಕಲನಾಡ ನಾಳುತಂವಿದ್ದಲಿ ಆ	nāyakaru kukkalanāḍa nāl ̤ ṳtaṃviddali ā
26	ಶ್ರೀಮನು ಮಹಾಕುಕ್ಕಲನಾಡ ಮಹಾಪ್ರಬು	śrīmanu mahākukkalanāḍa mahāprabu
27	ಕಿತನೆಲಿಯ ಹೊಂನಗವುಡನ ಮಕ್ಕಳು ಚಿಕ್ಕಂ	kitanĕliya hŏṃnagavuḍana makkalu ci ̤ kkaṃ
28	ಣ ಹೊಂನ್ನಪ ಗಂಟೆಗವುಡ ಮಲೆಯಪ ಮಂ	ṇa hŏṃnnapa gaṃṭĕgavuḍa malĕyapa maṃ
29	ಚಪ ಚಿಕ್ಕಹೊಂನ್ನಪ ಚೊಕ್ಕಂಣ ಗೋಪಗವು	capa cikkahŏṃnnapa cŏkkaṃṇa gopagavu
30	ಡ ರಾಮಂಣ ನಿಧಿಯ ಮಾಡಿಸಿದಿ ಹೊಂ	ḍa rāmaṃṇa nidhiya māḍisidi hŏṃ
31	ನ್ನಪ ಬೊಂಮ್ಮಂಣ ಬರಚಿರಯ್ಯನೊಳ	nnapa bŏṃmmaṃṇa baracirayyanŏla
32	ಗಾದ ಸಮಸ್ತ ಗವುಡುಗಳು . ಮ	gāda samasta gavuḍugalu . ma
33	ಯಿಲೆಯ ನಾಯಕ್ಕ ಚೆಂನೆಯಕ್ಕರಿಗೆ ಹಾರು	yilĕya nāyakka cĕṃnĕyakkarigĕ hāru
34	ವಹಳಿಯನು ಸರ್ಬ್ಬಮಾನ್ಯದ	vahaliyanu sarbbamānyada
35	ಕೊಡಗೆಯಾಗಿ ಕೊಟೆವಾದ ಯಿ ವೂರಲಿ	kŏḍagĕyāgi kŏṭĕvāda yi vūrali
36	ಹುಟಿದ ಸೆಸೆ ಸಿದಾಯ ಪೂಬಿ ಅ ಪೂರ್ಬಾ	hutida sese sidāya pubi a purbā
37	ಯ ಕಾಮಯ ದಂಣಾಯಕ ದೇವ ಮಯಿಲೆ	ya kāmaya daṃṇāyaka deva mayilĕ
38	ಯ ನಾಯಕರ ಹೊದರ ಕಾಣಿಕೆ ಕಡಾಯ .	ya nāyakara hŏdara kāṇikĕ kaḍāya .
39	ರ ಕೊಕು ನೀಡಿದ ಕಾಣಿಕೆ ಮುಂತಾಗಿ ಆರಮ	ra kŏku nīḍida kāṇikĕ muṃtāgi ārama
40	ನೆಯಲಿ ಏನು ಹುಟಿತ್ತನು ಚೆಂನೆಯನಾಯಕ್ಕ	nĕyali enu huṭittanu cĕṃnĕyanāyakka
41	ನೆ ಕೊಂಬನು ಯಿ ಮಾತಿಂಗೆ ತಪ್ಪು ತವಿದಿ ನೀ	nĕ kŏṃbanu yi mātiṃgĕ tappu tavidi nī
42	ರು ನೇಣು ಸರ್ಬ್ಬಮಾನ್ಯ ಯಿ ಮರಿಯಾದಿಯ	ru neṇu sarbbamānya yi mariyādiya
43	ಲಿ ನಾಯಕರ ಮಕ್ಕಳು ಮಕ್ಕಳು ಎಂಳು . .	li nāyakara makkal ̤ u makkal ̤ u ̤ ĕṃlu . .
44	ನಾಂದರ ನಡವುದು ಯಿ ಮರಿಯಾದಿಗೆ ಆರು ಅ	nāṃdara naḍavudu yi mariyādigĕ āru a
45	ಳುಪಿದವರು ಗಂಗೆಯ ಥಡಿಯಲಿ ತಗೆಳು ಕಪಿ	pi ̤ lṳpidavaru gaṃgĕya thaḍiyali tagĕlu kap
46	ಲೆಯ ಕೊಂದ ಪಾಪದಲಿ ಹೋಹರು ಯಿ ಮರಿ	lĕya kŏṃda pāpadali hoharu yi mari
47	ಯಾದಿಗೆ ನಾಡ ವೊಪ್ಪ ಶ್ರೀಮುಕ್ತನಾಥ ಬರದ	yādigĕ nāḍa vŏppa śrīmuktanātha barada
48	ಸೇನಬೋವ ಜಕಂಣ ಮಂಗಳ ಮಹಾ ಶ್ರೀಶ್ರೀಶ್ರೀ	senabova jakaṃṇa maṃgala mahā śrī śrī śrī

== Translation in English ==
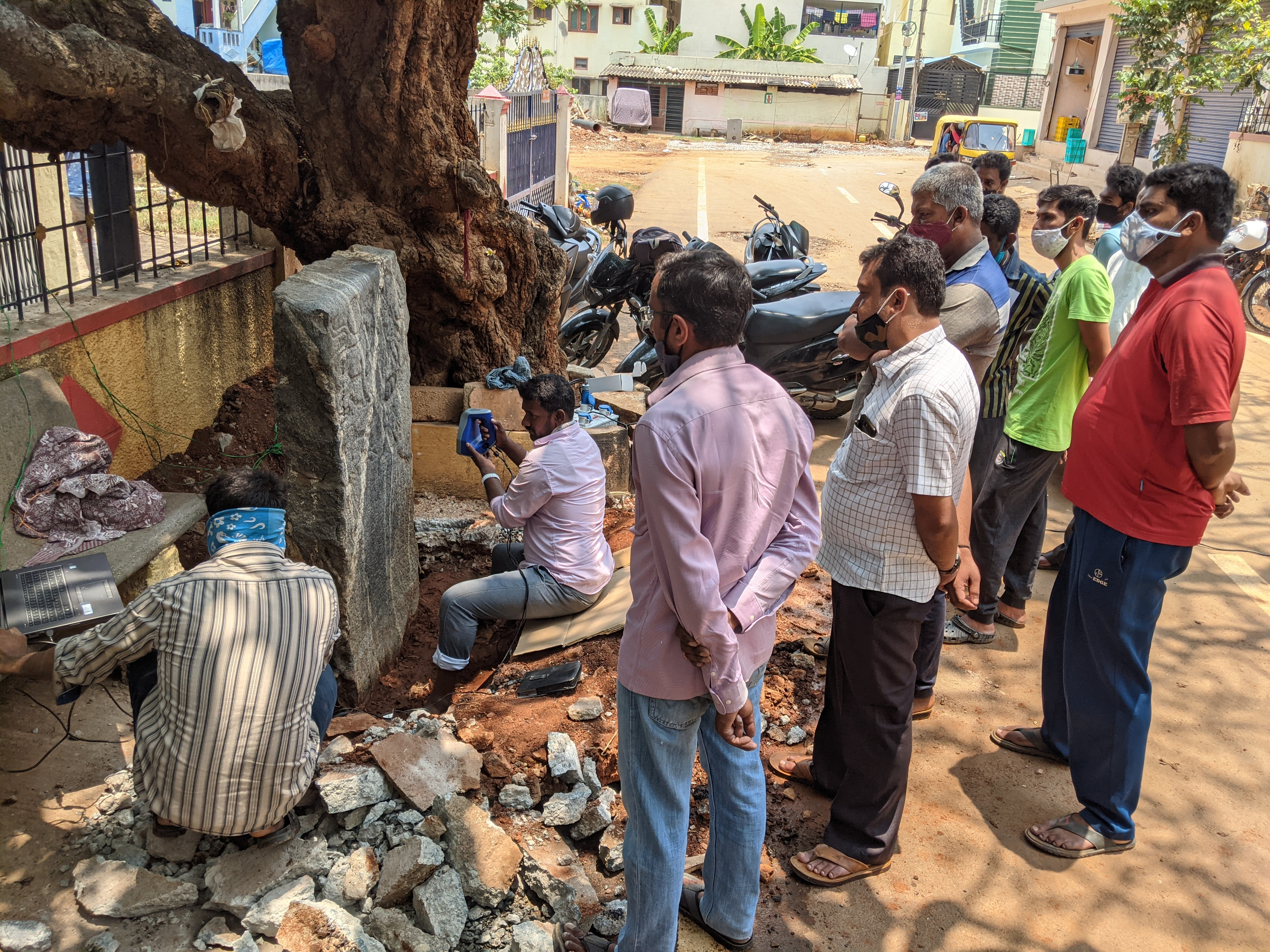
3D Scanning of the Byadarahalli Inscription and Hero Stone

The translated text has been published in Volume 9 of Epigraphia Carnatica. It reads as follows:

"Be it well. When, (with usual and other titles, including) a spear for the head of the Malava king, a Bairava to the Gurjjara king's minister (vajir), a Brahma-rakshasa to Hemmira-Raya, the form of. . . to Adava-Raya, the establisher of the Chola king, the setter up of the Pandya king, rooter up of the Magara king, displacer of the Kadava king,— 'Poysala vira-Narasinga-Deva's son Vira Ballala-Devarasa was in the residence of Dorasamudra, ruling the kingdom of the earth in the enjoy merit of all manner of pleasures : — (on the date specified), when the maha-samantadhipati, champion over the world of men, Meyile-Nayaka Chenneya-Nayaka was ruling the Kukkala-pad; — the Kukkala-nad maha-prabhu. . . . Honna-Gauda's son and others (named) granted the village as a sarvamanya-kodege, with all rights and taxes (specified). Imprecations. Written by the senabhova Jakkanna."

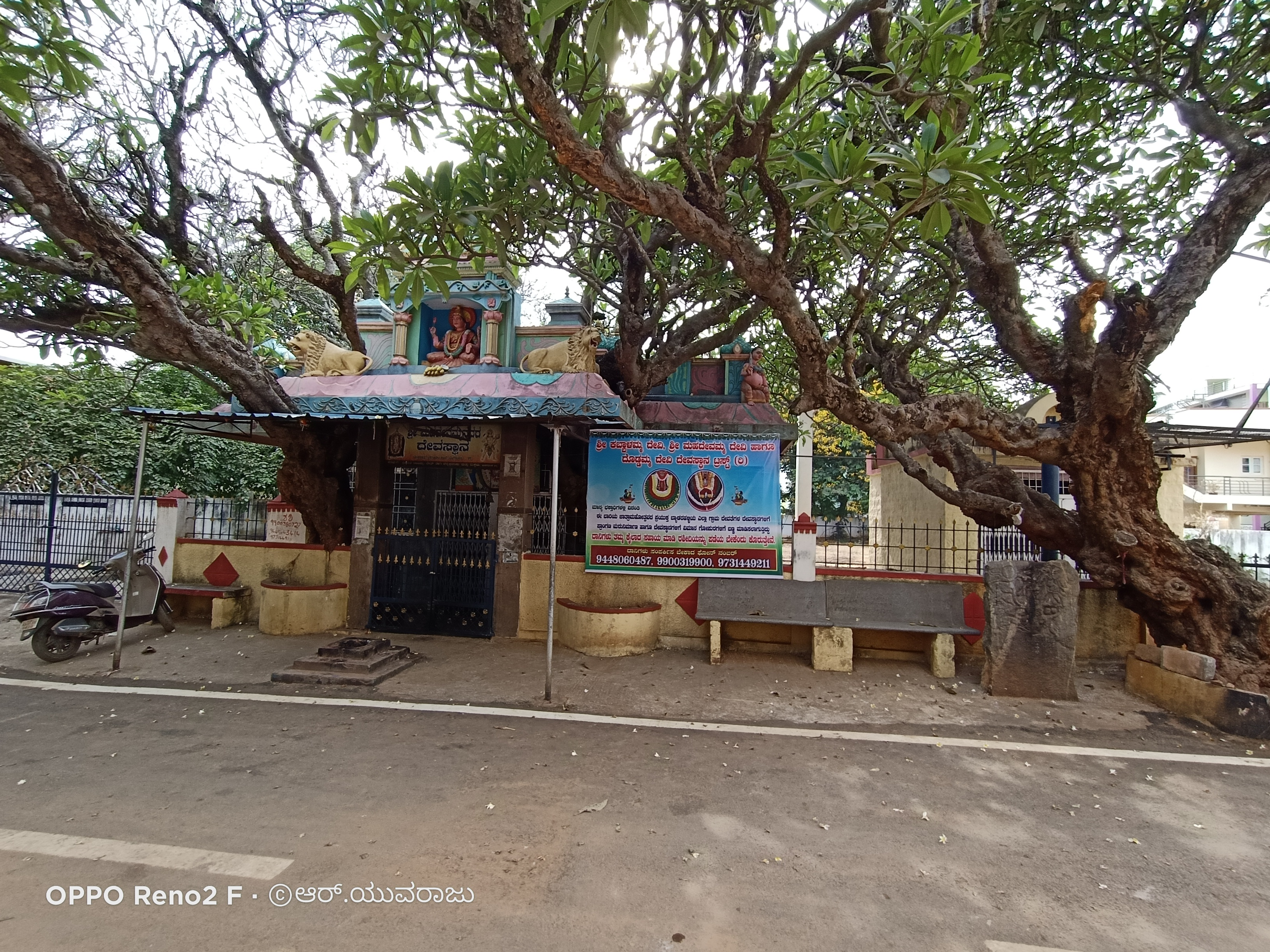
The Byadarahalli Hero Stone in situ

== See also ==
- Domlur inscriptions and hero stones
- Katigenahalli inscription and hero stone
