= Gopalpur, Dih, Raebareli (census code 145312) =

Gopalpur Shani Thakur-The Kings Birthplace Gopālpur
- Village
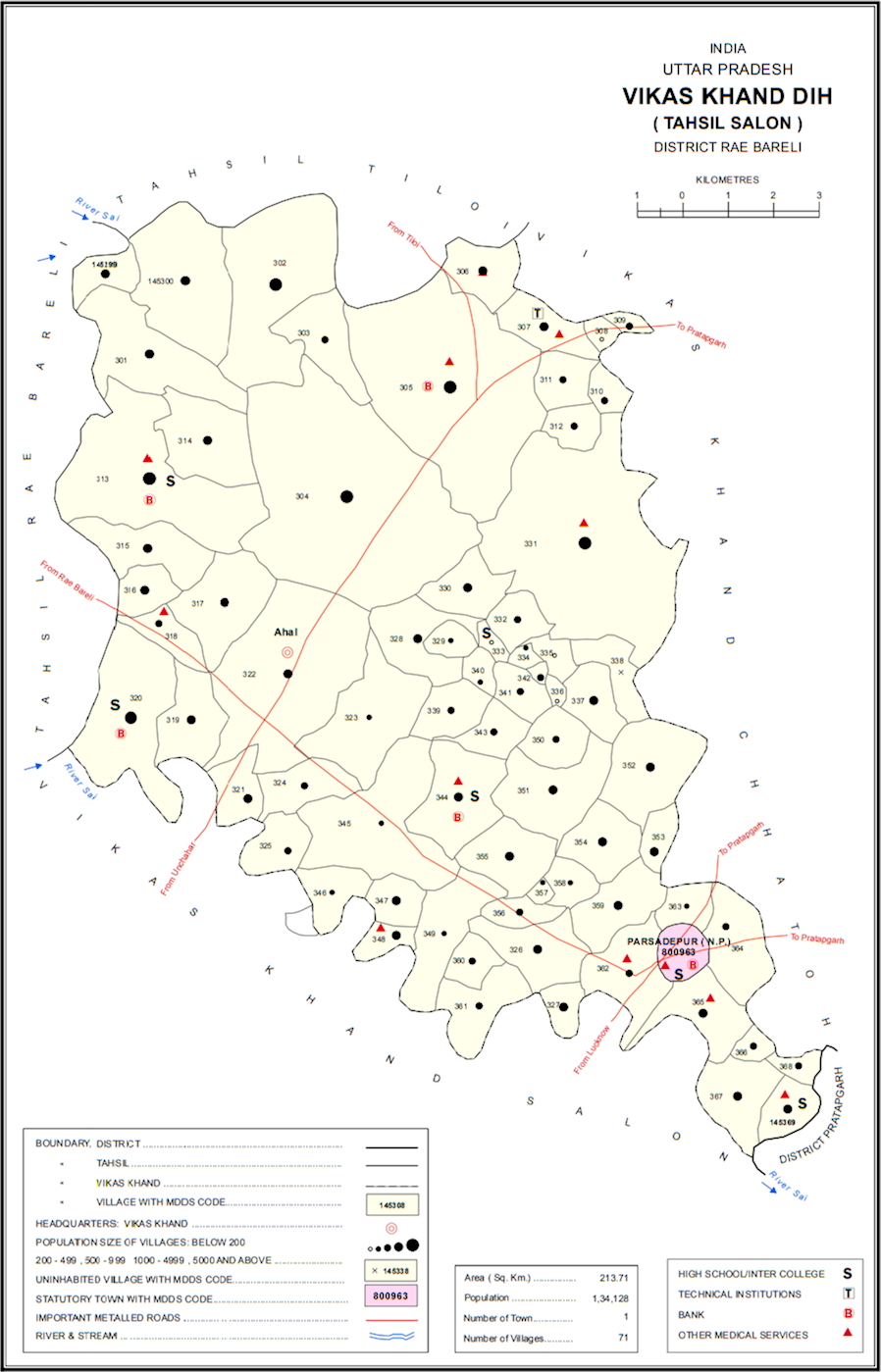
- Map showing Gopalpur (#312) in Dih CD block

- Location in Uttar Pradesh, India
- Coordinates: 26.188564°N 81.477366°E
- Country: India
- State: Uttar Pradesh
- District: Raebareli

Area
  - Total: 0.918 km^{2} (0.354 sq mi)

Population (2011)
  - Total: 521
  - Density: 568/km^{2} (1,470/sq mi)

Languages
  - Official: Hindi
- Time zone: UTC+5:30 (IST)
- Vehicle registration: UP-35

Gopalpur is a large village in Dih block of Rae Bareli district, Uttar Pradesh, India. It is located 29 km from Raebareli, the district headquarters. As of 2011, it has a population of 521 people, in 101 households. It has one primary school and no healthcare facilities, and does not host a weekly haat or a permanent market. Gopalpur belongs to the nyaya panchayat of Mau.

The 1951 census recorded Gopalpur as comprising 2 hamlets, with a total population of 188 people (88 male and 100 female), in 39 households and 39 physical houses. The area of the village was given as 217 acres. 1 resident was literate, a male. The village was listed as belonging to the pargana of Rokha and the thana of Nasirabad.

The 1961 census recorded Gopalpur as comprising 2 hamlets, with a total population of 243 people (116 male and 127 female), in 69 households and 66 physical houses. The area of the village was given as 217 acres.

The 1981 census recorded Gopalpur as having a population of 272 people, in 56 households, and having an area of 88.22 hectares. The main staple foods were listed as wheat and rice.

The 1991 census recorded Gopalpur as having a total population of 299 people (146 male and 153 female), in 69 households and 69 physical houses. The area of the village was listed as 91 hectares. Members of the 0-6 age group numbered 68, or 23% of the total; this group was 59% male (40) and 41% female (28). Members of scheduled castes made up 29% of the village's population, while no members of scheduled tribes were recorded. The literacy rate of the village was 12% (35 men and 1 women). 143 people were classified as main workers (72 men and 71 women), while 2 people were classified as marginal workers (both women); the remaining 154 residents were non-workers. The breakdown of main workers by employment category was as follows: 132 cultivators (i.e. people who owned or leased their own land); 4 agricultural labourers (i.e. people who worked someone else's land in return for payment); 0 workers in livestock, forestry, fishing, hunting, plantations, orchards, etc.; 0 in mining and quarrying; 0 household industry workers; 2 workers employed in other manufacturing, processing, service, and repair roles; 0 construction workers; 0 employed in trade and commerce; 3 employed in transport, storage, and communications; and 2 in other services.
