= Sankhe Khas =

Village in Gopalganj district, Bihar, India

Sankhe Khas Shankhe Khash; Sakhekhas
- Village
- Country: India
- State: Bihar
- District: Gopalganj
- Block: Uchkagaon

Government
  - Type: Gram panchayat
  - Body: Shankhe Khash Gram Panchayat

Area
  - Total: 4.99 km^{2} (1.93 sq mi)

Population (2011)
  - Total: 6,357
- PIN: 841438

Sankhe Khas (also spelled Shankhe Khash or Sakhekhas) is a village in the Uchkagaon Community Development Block of Gopalganj district in the Indian state of Bihar. It is administered by the Shankhe Khash Gram Panchayat and forms part of the areas included under the Gopalganj Assembly constituency as per delimitation lists.

== Geography ==
Sankhe Khas spans about 499 hectares (≈4.99 km²), with Mirganj noted as the nearest town at roughly 12 km for major economic activities.

== Demographics ==
As per the 2011 Census of India, Sankhe Khas had a population of 6,357 in 985 households, with an average sex ratio of 1034 and a literacy rate of 65.81% (male 78.88%, female 53.45%).

== Administration ==
The village is under Uchkagaon CD Block in Gopalganj district and is governed locally by the Shankhe Khash Gram Panchayat. The gram panchayat (listed as Sakhekhas/Shankhe Khash) appears in the composition of the Gopalganj Assembly constituency.

== See also ==
- Gopalganj district
