= Dandu Gopalapuram =

- village
- Interactive map of Dandu Gopalapuram
- Location in Andhra Pradesh, India Dandu Gopalapuram (India)
- Coordinates: 18.55°N 84.23°E
- Country: India
- State: Andhra Pradesh
- District: Srikakulam

Population
  - Total: 2,600+

Languages
  - Official: Telugu
- Time zone: UTC+5:30 (IST)
- PIN: 532212
- Telephone code: 08945
- Nearest city: Tekkali
- Sex ratio: 980:965 ♂/♀
- Literacy: 51.7%
- Lok Sabha constituency: Srikakulam
- Vidhan Sabha constituency: Tekkali

Dandu Gopalapuram is a village and panchayat in Santha Bommali mandal, Srikakulam district of Andhra Pradesh, India. There is a small railway station here in Howrah-Chennai mainline under East Coast Railway, Indian Railways.

== Demographics ==
As of 2001 Indian census, the demographic details of

- Total Population: 2,584 in 579 Households
- Male Population: 1,303 and Female Population: 1,281
- Children Under 6 years of age: 329 (Boys Under 6 Years: - 162 and Girls - 167)
- Total Literates: 1,335
- The number of employers in this village is 60

== Transportation ==
- Dandu Gopalapuram village is well connected by APSRTC Buses, which runs from Srikakulam, Kotabommali to Tekkali, Vaddi Thandra Villages.
- Autos, Cabs are in good frequency to reach this Dandu Gopalapuram village.
- State Highway 111 makes junction at Vaddi Thandra Village.
- Major district road 59 Passes through Dandu Gopalapuram, from Vaddi Thandra to Ravivalasa village and meets State Highway 90 at Ravivalasa village near Tekkali.
