= Munderga =

Munderga Mundargi
- Village
- Location within Karnataka Location within India
- Coordinates: 16°46′41″N 077°10′59″E
- Country: India
- State: Karnataka
- District: Yadgir district
- Taluka: Yadgir

Government
  - Type: Panchayati raj (India)
  - Body: Gram panchayat

Population (2001)
  - Total: 3,150

Languages
  - Official: Kannada
- Time zone: UTC+5:30 (IST)
- ISO 3166 code: IN-KA
- Vehicle registration: KA
- Website: karnataka.gov.in

Munderga is a panchayat village in the southern state of Karnataka, India. Administratively, Munderga is under Yadgir Taluka of Yadgir District in Karnataka. Munderga is 6 km by road west of the village of Ramasamudra, and 5 km by road east of the town of Yadgir. The nearest railhead is in Yadgir.

There are four villages in the gram panchayat: Munderga, Ashoknagar, Belgera, and Kurkumbal.

== Demographics ==
As of 2001 census, the village of Munderga had 3,150 inhabitants, with 1,642 males and 1,508 females.
