= Gopalpur, Yadgir =

Gopalpur
- village
- Location in Karnataka, India Gopalpur (India)
- Coordinates: 16°44′30″N 77°18′26″E
- Country: India
- State: Karnataka
- District: Yadgir
- Taluka: Yadgir
- Gram panchayat: Paspool

Government
  - Type: Panchayat raj
  - Body: Gram panchayat

Population (2011)
  - Total: 1,383

Languages
  - Official: Kannada
- Time zone: UTC+5:30 (IST)
- ISO 3166 code: IN-KA
- Vehicle registration: KA
- Website: karnataka.gov.in

Gopalpur is a small village/hamlet in Yadgir Taluk in the Yadgir District of Karnataka, India. It comes under Gopalpur Panchayath. It belongs to Gulbarga Division. It is located 1 km towards East from District headquarters Yadgir and is 497 km from the state capital Bangalore.

The Gopalpur postal code is 585321 and postal head office is Ramasamudra (Yadgir).

Gopalpur is surrounded by Shahapur Taluk to the west, Wadi Taluk to the north, Narayanpet Taluk to the east and Damaragidda Taluk to the east. Cities nearby Gopalpur include Yadgir, Shahpur, Wadi and Narayanpet.

== Demographics ==
Kannada is the local language. The total population of Gopalpur is 1,383, comprising 660 males and 723 females and living in 176 houses. The total area of Gopalpur is 535 hectares.

== See also ==
- Yadgir
