= Rokha =

- Village
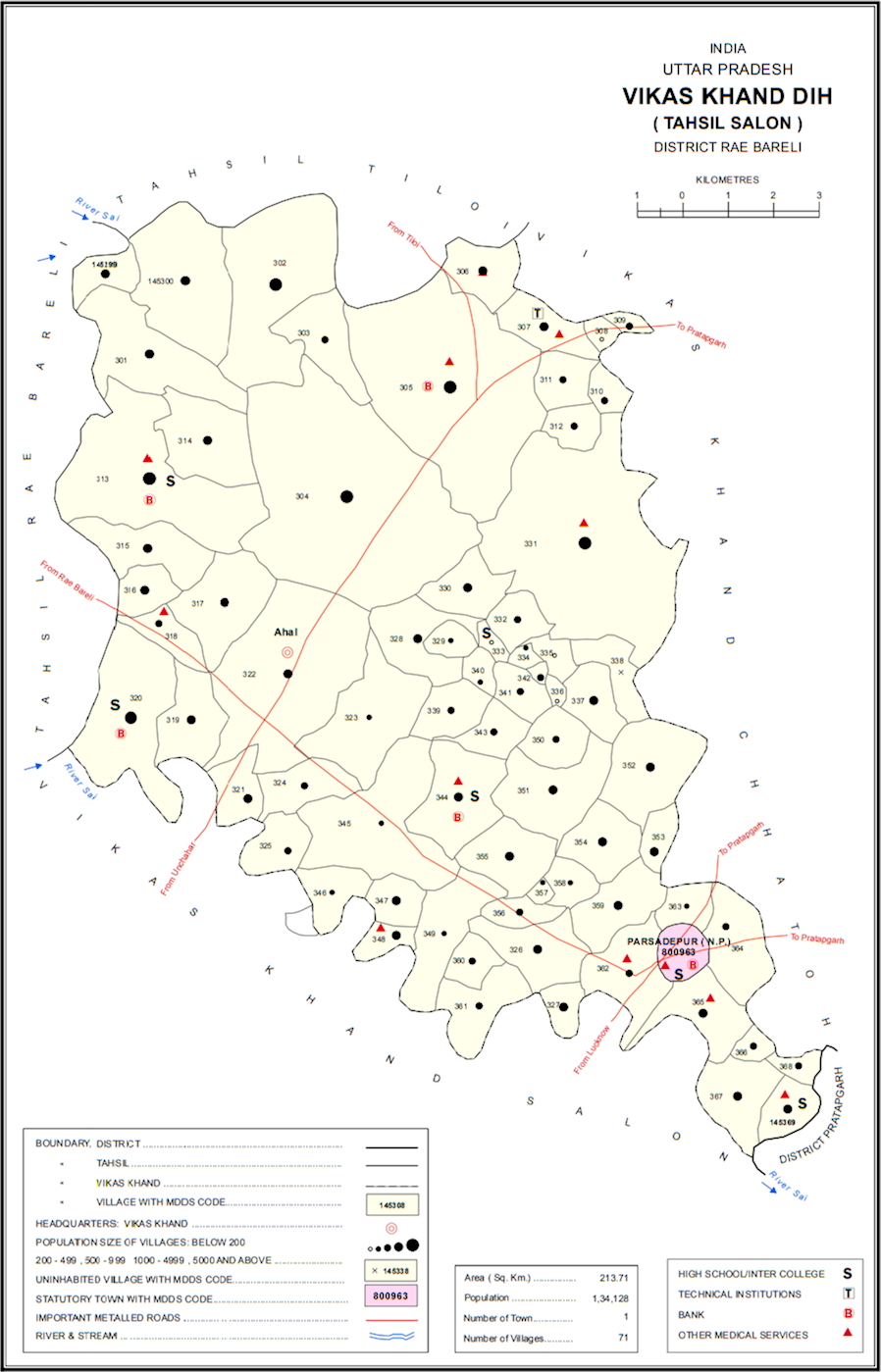
- Map showing Rokha (#304) in Dih CD block

- Location in Uttar Pradesh, India
- Coordinates: 26.172563°N 81.432818°E
- Country: India
- State: Uttar Pradesh
- District: Raebareli

Area
  - Total: 18.991 km^{2} (7.332 sq mi)

Population (2011)
  - Total: 10,292
  - Density: 541.94/km^{2} (1,403.6/sq mi)

Languages
  - Official: Hindi
- Time zone: UTC+5:30 (IST)
- Vehicle registration: UP-35

Rokha is a large village in Dih block of Rae Bareli district, Uttar Pradesh, India. Historically the namesake of a pargana, Rokha is a predominantly agricultural village consisting of many hamlets. It is located 28 km from Raebareli, the district headquarters. The large village of Mau also borders Rokha to the north. Rokha is connected by road with Nasirabad and Jais to the northeast and Suchi to the southwest.

As of 2011, Rokha has a population of 10,292 people, in 1,801 households. It has 7 primary schools and no healthcare facilities, and it hosts a weekly haat but not a permanent market. Markets are held on Wednesdays and Sundays, and the main items traded include cloth, grain, gur, vegetables, and ornaments. Rokha belongs to the nyaya panchayat of Mau.

== History ==
At the turn of the 20th century, Rokha was described as a large agricultural village located in the southern part of the pargana. It held markets twice per week in the bazar, and it had a primary school. As of 1901, the population was 3,486 people, including a Muslim minority of 583. Ahirs were the main caste group in the village. At that point, Rokha was held in taluqdari tenure by the Kanhpuria raja of Tiloi. Also mentioned was "an old site close to the village on the south-west crowned by a Hindu temple."

The 1951 census recorded Rokha as comprising 41 hamlets, with a total population of 3,692 people (1,885 male and 1,807 female), in 844 households and 840 physical houses. The area of the village was given as 4,784 acres. 183 residents were literate, 172 male and 11 female. The village was listed as belonging to the pargana of Rokha and the thana of Nasirabad.

The 1961 census recorded Rokha as comprising 28 hamlets, with a total population of 4,252 people (2,150 male and 2,102 female), in 956 households and 876 physical houses. The area of the village was given as 4,784 acres and it had a post office at that point. Average attendance of the village haat was about 50 people.

The 1981 census recorded Rokha as having a population of 5,806 people, in 1,456 households, and having an area of 1,936.83 hectares. The main staple foods were listed as wheat and rice.

The 1991 census recorded Rokha as having a total population of 6,666 people (3,463 male and 3,203 female), in 1,392 households and 1,381 physical houses. Members of the 0-6 age group numbered 1,339, or 20% of the total; this group was 51% male (683) and 49% female (656). Members of scheduled castes made up 30.5% of the village's population, while no members of scheduled tribes were recorded. The literacy rate of the village was 10% (456 men and 199 women). 1,950 people were classified as main workers (1,770 men and 180 women), while 333 people were classified as marginal workers (28 men and 305 women); the remaining 4,383 residents were non-workers. The breakdown of main workers by employment category was as follows: 1,229 cultivators (i.e. people who owned or leased their own land); 450 agricultural labourers (i.e. people who worked someone else's land in return for payment); 8 workers in livestock, forestry, fishing, hunting, plantations, orchards, etc.; 0 in mining and quarrying; 2 household industry workers; 99 workers employed in other manufacturing, processing, service, and repair roles; 4 construction workers; 46 employed in trade and commerce; 9 employed in transport, storage, and communications; and 105 in other services.
