= Ramasamudra =

Ramasamudra Ramsamudra
- Village
- Location within Karnataka Location within India
- Coordinates: 16°46′21″N 077°14′07″E
- Country: India
- State: Karnataka
- District: Yadgir district
- Taluka: Yadgir

Government
  - Type: Panchayati raj (India)
  - Body: Gram panchayat

Population (2001)
  - Total: 4,369

Languages
  - Official: Kannada
- Time zone: UTC+5:30 (IST)
- PIN: 585321
- ISO 3166 code: IN-KA
- Vehicle registration: KA
- Website: karnataka.gov.in

Ramasamudra is a panchayat village in the southern state of Karnataka, India. Administratively, Ramasamudra is under Yadgir Taluka of Yadgir District in Karnataka. The village of Ramasamudra is 6 km by road east of the village of Munderga, and 8.6 km by road west of the village of Paspool. The nearest railhead is in Yadgir.

There are two villages in the gram panchayat: Ramasamudra and Ashinal.

== Demographics ==
At the 2001 census, the village of Ramasamudra had 4,369 inhabitants, with 2,199 males and 2,170 females.
