= Gopalpur tussar silk =

Wild silk from Odisha, India

- Geographical indication
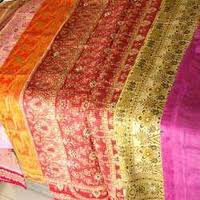
- Alternative names: ଗୋପାଳପୁର ଟସର ବସ୍ତ୍ର
- Type: Fabric
- Area: Gopalpur, Jajpur district, Odisha
- Country: India
- Registered: 2009
- Material: Silk

The village of Gopalpur in Jajpur District in the Indian state of Odisha is known for producing tussar silk. The handicraft received the Geographical Indication tag by the Government of India in 2009. The fabric may be used for dhoti, shawls, scarves, and saris.

== Process ==
=== Thread ===
Women and girls usually reel the tussar threads holding 'natai' in their right hand and unwinding the thread around the cocoons with their other hand. Twisting the filament, the weaver winds the yarns on the wooden 'natai' at a continuous speed. Embellishments are done by hand, either with extra weft or extra warp with a 'bandha' pattern in hand. The embellishments increase the value of the fabric. Alternatively, reeling machines are available.

=== Spinning ===
Traditionally, thread is wound around the chadaki to fill the bobbins (nali) for weft with the help of a spinning wheel (charakha). Gandhi charakha or wooden charakha have been replaced by a metal part.

== Weaving ==
Fabric is woven using a 'cut shuttle technique', in which shuttles interlock with one another to form foda kumbha in the weft direction. Shuttles on both sides interlock with the main shuttle for the main body of the fabric. By tie and die bandha technique, the foda kumbha pattern is copied for multiple productions.

== Design ==
Threads are dyed in different shades, such as maroon, red, plum and rust. Fabrics are designed in tussar and gheecha and enhanced with a weft and cut shuttle technique.

== Industry ==
The tussar silk is mainly marketed by PWCS and SHGs traders through the Boyanika (OSHWCS), Sambalpuri Bastralaya, SERIFED, Pvt. traders. Sales also take place at exhibitions and in local markets. According to a 2013-14 survey, 745 looms operate in this cluster. Around 5,000 people are dependent on this industry for income.
