= Gopalganj =

Gopalganj may refer to:

== Bangladesh ==
- Gopalganj District, Bangladesh, a district of Dhaka Division
  - Gopalganj, Bangladesh, a town and headquarter of Gopalganj district
  - Gopalganj Sadar Upazila, an upazila of Gopalganj District
  - Gopalganj-1, a parliamentary constituency
  - Gopalganj-2, a parliamentary constituency
  - Gopalganj-3, a parliamentary constituency

== India ==
- Gopalganj Lok Sabha constituency, Bihar
- Gopalganj Assembly constituency, Bihar
- Gopalganj, Bihar, a town, municipality and headquarters of Gopalganj district
- Gopalganj district, India, a district of the state of Bihar
- Gopalganj subdivision, a subdivision of Gopalganj district
- Gopalganj, Madhya Pradesh, a village in Madhya Pradesh; see Wainganga River

== See also ==
- Gopalpur (disambiguation)
