= Suchi, Raebareli =

Suchi
- Village
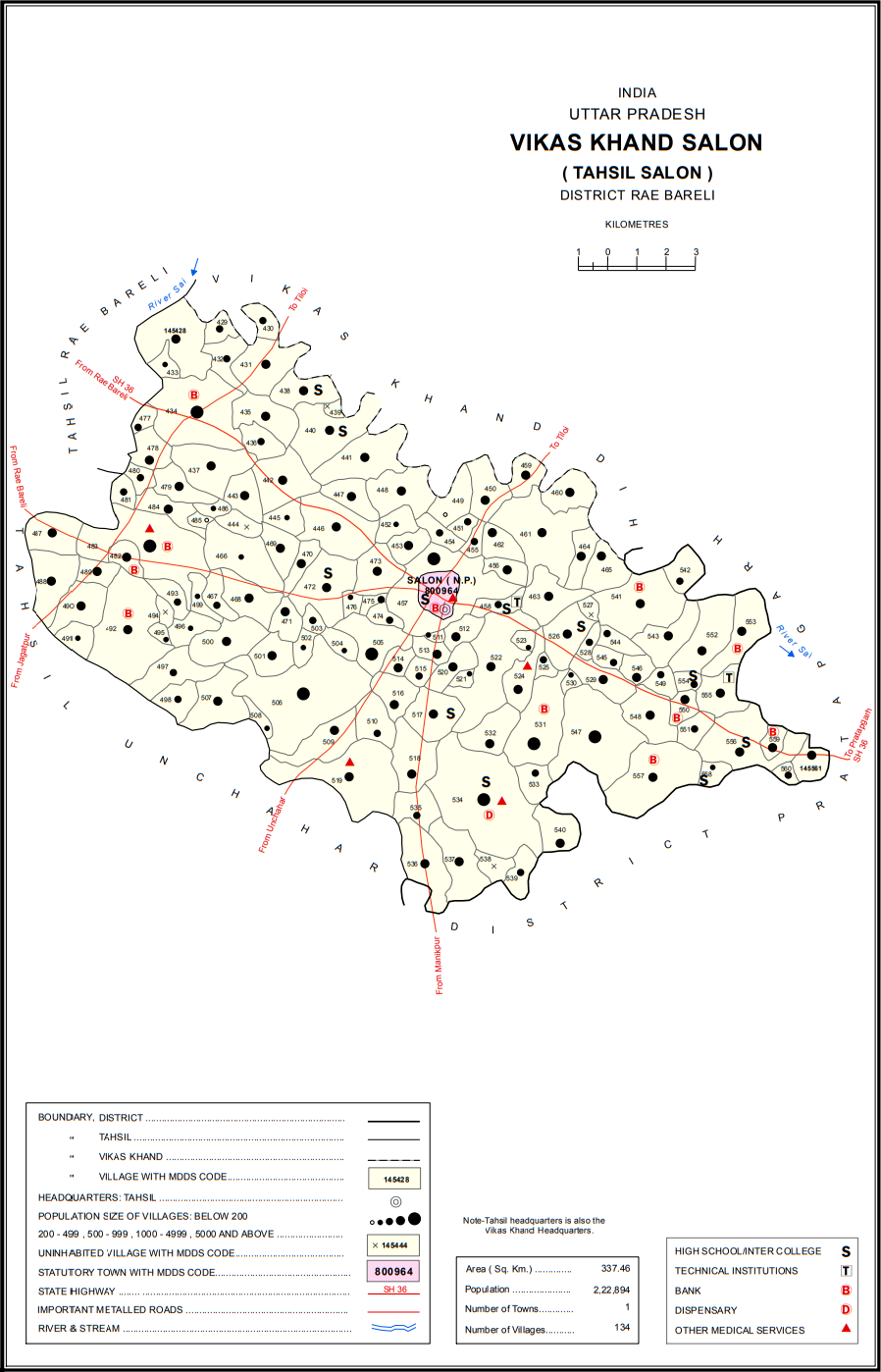
- Map showing Suchi (#434) in Salon CD block

- Location in Uttar Pradesh, India
- Coordinates: 26.081959°N 81.362372°E
- Country India: India
- State: Uttar Pradesh
- District: Raebareli

Area
  - Total: 6.499 km^{2} (2.509 sq mi)

Population (2011)
  - Total: 5,707
  - Density: 878.1/km^{2} (2,274/sq mi)

Languages
  - Official: Hindi
- Time zone: UTC+5:30 (IST)
- Vehicle registration: UP-35

Suchi is a village in Salon block of Rae Bareli district, Uttar Pradesh, India. It is located 10 km from Salon, the block headquarters. As of 2011, Suchi has a population of 5,707 people, in 1,070 households. It has one primary school and no healthcare facilities. The village hosts a Dussehra fair on Asvina Sudi 15; vendors bring everyday items to sell at the festival.

The 1961 census recorded Suchi as comprising 12 hamlets, with a total population of 1,876 people (970 male and 906 female), in 397 households and 368 physical houses. The area of the village was given as 1,667 acres and it had electrical access as well as a library and post office at that point. Average attendance of the Dussehra festival was about 1,000 people.

The 1981 census recorded Suchi (as "Sunchi") as having a population of 2,821 people, in 784 households, and having an area of 752.72 hectares. The main staple foods were given as wheat and rice.
