= Yelahanka inscriptions and hero stones =

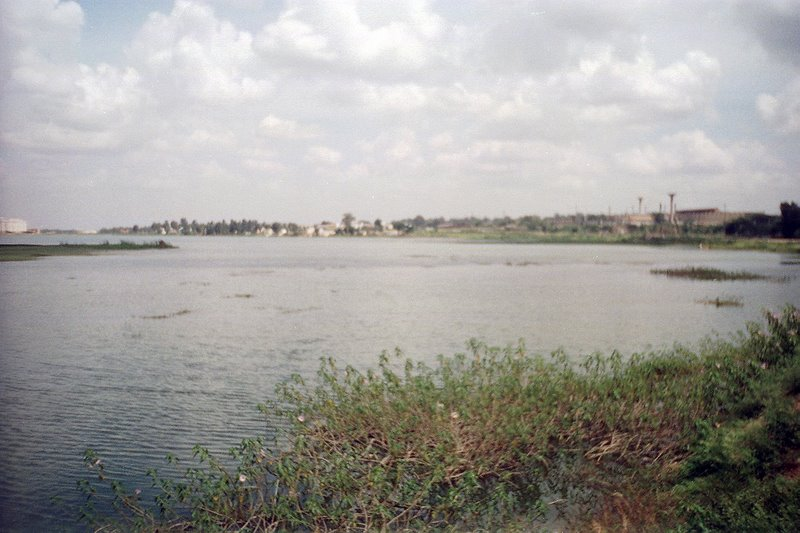
A view of Yelahanka Lake. Picture courtesy: Wikimedia Commons

Yelahanka is a locality in North Bengaluru. The historical administrative unit, Yelahanka Naadu, is mentioned variously in inscriptions as Ilaipakka, Elava, and Yelavaka, all corresponding to Yelahanka. The settlement had been in existence prior to the 12th century. During the Chola rule, the region was referred to as Ilaipakka Naadu in Tamil. An inscription dated 1267 CE, discovered in Doddaballapur, mentions Dechi Devarasa ruling the region with Yelahanka as his capital under the aegis of the Hoysala monarch Narasimha III. Later, during the Hoysala period, the city came to be known as Elavanka, which gradually evolved into Yelahanka.

T. V. Annaswamy, in his book Bengaluru to Bangalore, suggests that the name Yelahanka is derived from the word Valipakka, meaning "along the highway". Yelahanka also holds historical importance as it was the seat of power of the feudal chiefs of the Karnataka Empire, known as the Yelahanka Mahanaadaprabhus, to whom Kempegowda belonged. It is believed that Hiriya Kempegowda built a fort in the locality; however, the only surviving reference today is toponymic, in the form of a road named Kote Beedi (meaning "fort road" in Kannada).

The suffix naadu referred to a historical administrative unit, with states divided into naadu, which were further subdivided into seeme. Present-day Yelahanka houses four Kannada inscriptions, which have been documented in Volume 9 of Epigraphia Caranatica and in the Quarterly Journal of the Mythic Society.

== Yelahanka 1410 CE Macherusha Setti Deepamaale Kamba inscription ==
Yelahanka 1410 CE Macherusha Setti Venugopalaswamy Deepamale Kamba inscription
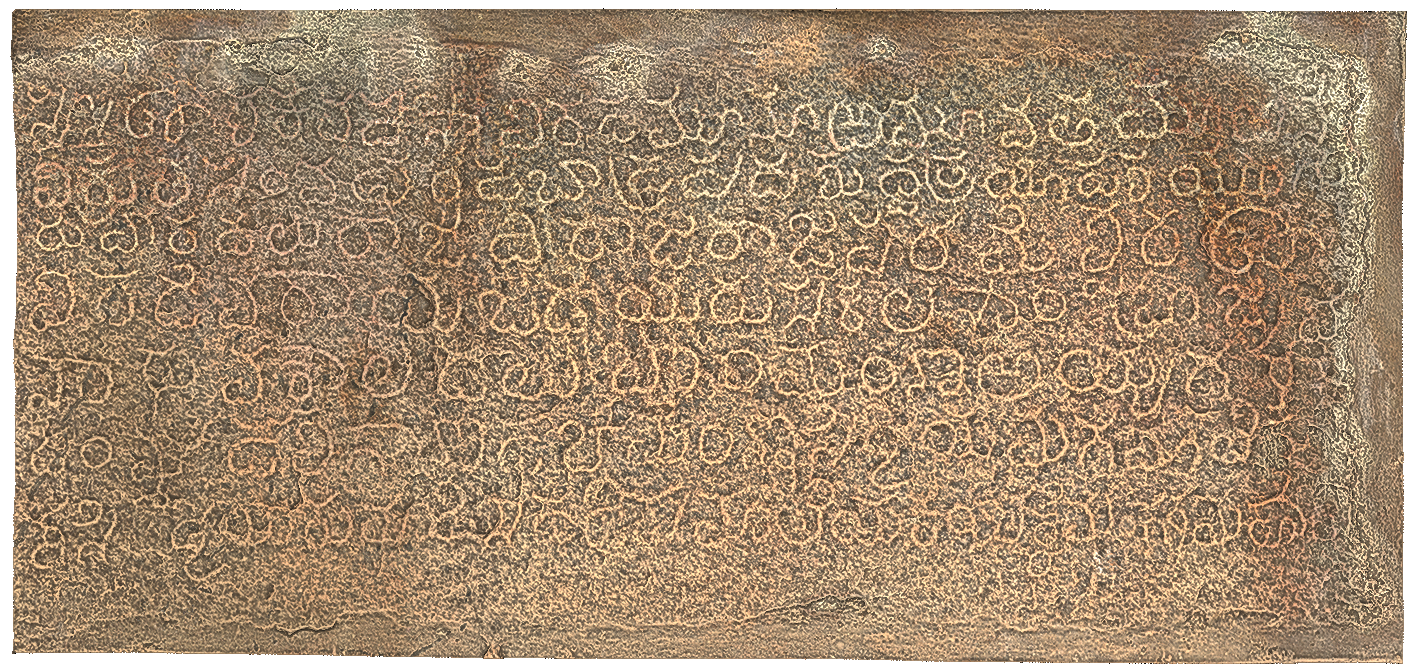
- Digital image of the Yelahanka 1410 CE Macherusha Setti Venugopalaswamy Deepamale Kamba inscription
- Material: Stone
- Height: 96 cm (38 in)
- Width: 96 cm (38 in)
- Writing: Kannada
- Created: 11 September 1410 (615 years ago)
- Discovered: 1902
- Discovered by: B L Rice
- Present location: 13.102714°N 77.593775°E
- Language: Kannada
- https://mythicsociety.github.io/AksharaBhandara/#/learn/Shasanagalu?id=115066

The inscription, dated 1410 CE, records the donation of a Deepamale pillar by Macherusha Setti, son of Bommana Setti, during the reign of King Devaraya of the Vijayanagara Empire (also referred to as the Karnataka Empire). A Deepamale is a stone pillar usually erected in front of Hindu temples, fitted with multiple lamp niches, and used for lighting lamps during festivals and special occasions.

The inscription identifies Bommana Setti as Dashagana Bommana Setti. The term Dashagana is a compound word, with dasha meaning "ten" and gana referring to a traditional oil extraction unit, suggesting that he may have owned ten such units. The surname Setti (also rendered Shetty) was historically associated with mercantile and trading communities in South India and continues to be used today among groups such as the Komatis, Nagarathars, and other traditional trading communities.

=== Transliterations of the inscription ===
The inscription was documented in Epigraphia Caranatica, and later reinterpreted by the Mythic Society.

Digital images of the inscription, individual characters, transliterations, and related information have been made available through the Akshara Bhandara software.

Line Number	Kannada	IAST
1	ಸ್ವಸ್ತಿಶ್ರೀ ಶಕವರ್ಷ ಸಾವಿಱದ ಮೂನೂಱ ಮೂವತಮೂಱನೆ	svastiśrī śakavarṣa sāviṟada mūnūṟa mūvatamūṟanĕ
2	ವಿಕ್ರುತ ಸಂವದರದ ಬಾದ್ರಪದ ಶುದ್ಧ ತ್ರಯೋದಶೆಯೂ ಗು	vikruta saṃvadarada bādrapada śuddha trayodaśĕyū gu
3	ರುವಾರದಲು ರಾಜಧಿರಾಜ ರಾಜಪರಮೇಶ್ವರ ಶ್ರೀ	ruvāradalu rājadhirāja rājaparameśvara śri
4	ವೀರದೇವರಾಯ ಒಡೆಯರು ಸಕಲ ಸಾಂಬ್ರಾಜ್ಯವ	vīradevarāya ŏḍĕyaru sakala sāṃbrājyava
5	ನಾಳುವ ಕಾಲದಲು ಬೊಂಮಂಣ ಅಯ್ಯಗಳ	nāluva kāladalu bŏṃmaṃṇa ayyagal ̤ a
6	ಧಂರ್ಮ್ಮ ದಶಗಾಣದ ಬೊಮಂಣ್ನಸೆಟ್ಟಿಯ ಮಗ ಮಾಚೆರೂ	dhaṃrmma daśagāṇada bŏmaṃṇnasĕṭṭiya maga mācĕrū
7	ಶ ಸೆಟ್ಟಿಯರು ಮಾಡಿಸಿದ ದೀಪಮಾಲೆಯ ಕಂಭಕ್ಕೆ ಮಂಗಳ ಮಹಾಶ್ರೀ	śa sĕṭṭiyaru māḍisida dīpamālĕya kaṃbhakkĕ maṃgala mahāśrī

== Yelahanka 1440 CE Hanumanta Devara Garudakamba inscription ==
Yelahanka 1440 CE Hanumanta Devara Garudakamba inscription
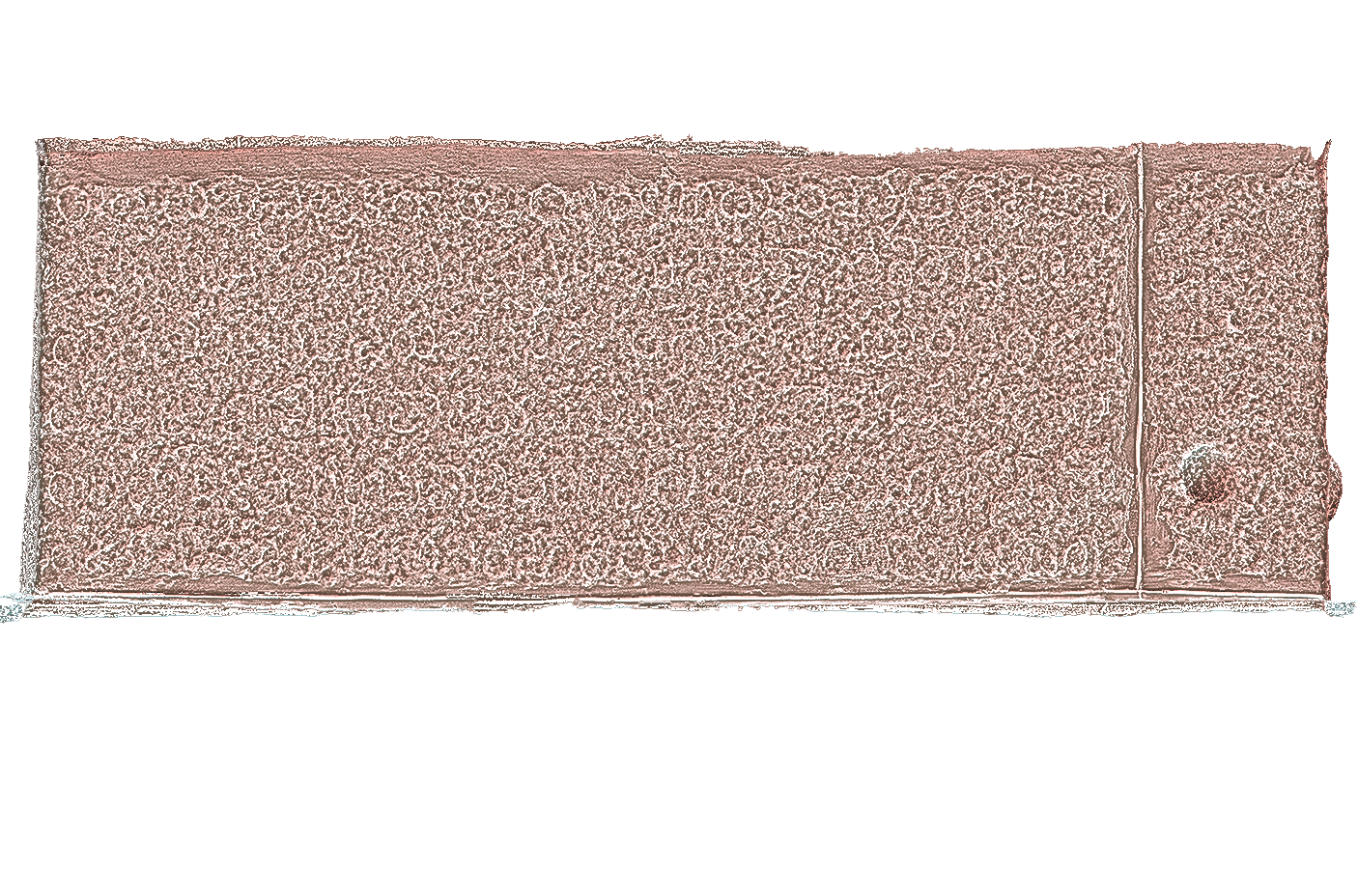
- Digital image obtained by 3D scanning of the Yelahanka 1440 CE Hanumanta Devara Garudakamba inscription

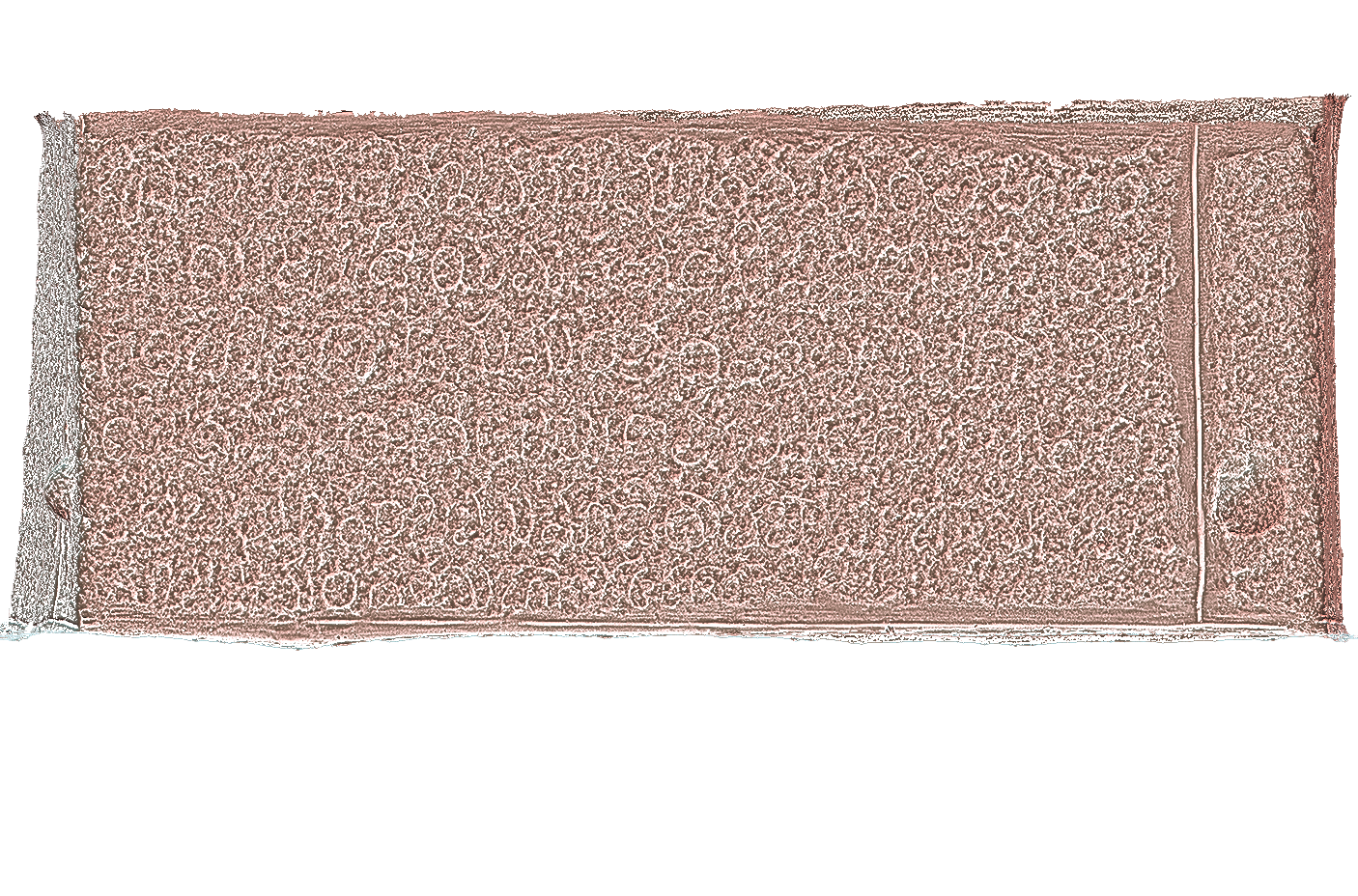
- Digital image obtained by 3D scanning of the Yelahanka 1440 CE Hanumanta Devara Garudakamba inscription
- Material: Stone
- Height: 38 cm (15 in)
- Width: 114 cm (45 in)
- Writing: Kannada
- Created: 1440CE
- Discovered: 2022
- Discovered by: The Mythic Society-Bengaluru Inscription 3D Digital Conservation Project
- Present location: 13.102714°N 77.593775°E
- Language: Knnada

The inscription, dated to 1440 CE, records the construction of a Garudakamba (pillar) for a Hanumantha temple by a merchant (setti). A Garudakamba is a type of pillar often installed in front of temples, dedicated to Garuda or used as a ritual marker, and frequently associated with Vaishnava temple architecture. The record also mentions the reign of King Devaraya of the Vijayanagara Empire (also known as the Karnataka Empire).

Much of the text has been effaced, making parts of the record unreadable. The inscription makes reference to Shivanasamudra, which some scholars interpret as an allusion to present-day Hesaraghatta. It is interesting to note that inscription refers to a Hanumantha temple and the temple today is known as a Sri Venugopala Swamy temple. It is also of note that while the inscription refers to a Hanumantha temple, the site is presently associated with the Sri Venugopala Swamy Temple.

=== Physical characteristics ===
The first side of the inscription measures 38 cm in height and 114 cm in width, while the second side measures 39 cm in height and 96 cm in width. The Kannada characters are approximately 4.2 cm tall, 4.3 cm wide, and 0.15 cm deep.

=== Transliterations of the inscription ===
The inscription was first documented and published in the Quarterly Journal of the Mythic Society.

Line Number	Kannada	IAST
One Side
1	ಸ್ವಸ್ತಶ್ರೀ ಸಕವ . . .1303(?). ನೆಯ ರೌದ್ರಿ ಸಂವತ್ಸರದ ಪ್ರಥ. . .(ಮ?)	svastasri sakava . . 1303(?) . néya raudri samvatsarada pratha .(ma?)
2	. . . . . . ಶ್ರೀಮನ್ ಮಹಾರಾಜಾಧಿರಾಜ ರಾಜ. . . . . .	. . . . . .sriman maharajadhiraja raja. . . . .
3	. . . . . . . . . . ವರು. . . . . . . ಜದಿ(ಧಿ)	. . . . . . .varu . . . . jadi(dhi)
4	. . . .. . . . ಶ್ರೀವೀರ ಪ್ರತಾಪ ದೇವರಾಯ ಮಹಾರಾಯ. . . . .	. . . . . .srivira pratapa devaraya maharaya. . . . . .
5	. . . .. . . . . . . . . . . . . . . . . . . . . . . . .	. . . . . . . . . . . . . . . . . . . . . . . . .
6	. . . . . . . . . . . ಹಿ(?)ರಿಯಕೆ. . . . . . . ..	. . . . . . . . . . . hi(?)riyake . . . . . . . ..
Second Side
7	. . . . .ದಿನಾಶಿವನಸಮುದ್ರದ. . . . . ರ. ಹ(?). . . . . .	. . . . . .dinasivanasamudrada. . . . . ra.ha(?). . . . . .
8	ಯ ಸೆಟ್ಟಿಯ ಮಗ . . . .ಸೆಟ್ಟಿ	ya settiya maga . . . .setti
9	. . . . . .ಶ್ರೀ ಹನುಮಂತ ದೇವರ . . . . . .	. . . . . .Srl hanumamta devara. . . . . .
10	. . . . . . . . . . .ಥ (ದ?). . . . . . .	. . . . . . . . . . .tha(da?). . . . . . .
11	ಕಂಬ ಈ ಕಂಬವನು ಮಾಡಿದ. . . . . . . .	kamba yi kambavanu madida. . . . . . . .
12	. . . . . . . . . . . .ಮಂಗಳ ಮಹಾಶ್ರೀ ಶ್ರೀ ಶ್ರೀ	. . . . . . . . . . . .mamgala mahasri Sri Sri

== Yelahanka 14th Century CE Tamil inscription ==
The Yelahanka 14th century CE inscription is a Tamil epigraph written in Grantha characters. As much of the text published is incomplete, the full meaning of the inscription cannot be determined. The present physical status of the inscription is not known. It was first documented in Volume 9 of Epigraphia Caranatica.

=== Transliterations of the inscription ===
The transliteration of the text, as published in Epigraphia Carnatica, reads:

"svasti srimanu. . . . .mandalesvaran. . . . .na. . . . .malla na, vara. . .. n ana Tamma parkattikku-ppari. . . . . detta. . . . lavena kana. . .kandi maran man-tetti. . . Sohakiruti-sammasa. . . . . .ttu S'ittirai-mada nal. . . . . i-kkallu-nati … . .Velandatti udamai"

=== Translation ===
The translation, as published in Epigraphia Carnatica, reads:

"While the (maha) mandalesvara, (Tribhu)vanamalla (on the date specified) set up this stone."

== Yelahanka 1800 CE Kanteerava Arasa's Garuda Kambha inscription ==
Yelahanka 1800 CE Kanteerava Arasa's Garuda Kambha inscription
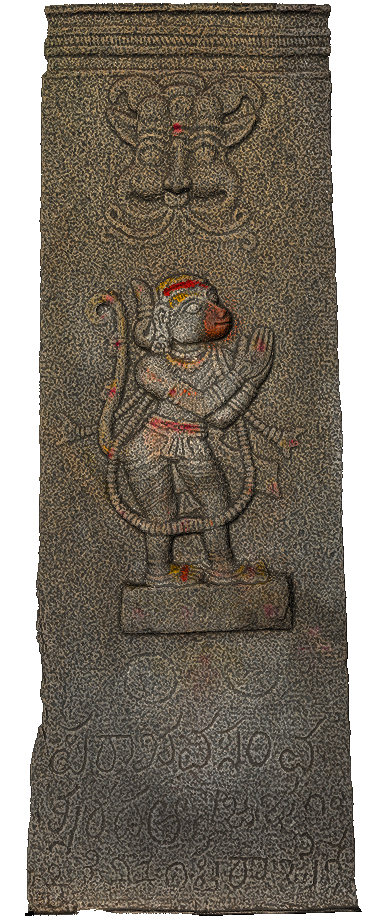
- Digital image of the Yelahanka 1800 CE Kanteerava Arasa's Garuda Kambha inscription
- Material: Stone
- Height: 33 cm (13 in)
- Width: 40 cm (16 in)
- Created: 1800CE
- Discovered: 1902
- Discovered by: B L Rice
- Present location: 13.102714°N 77.593775°E
- Language: Kannada
- https://mythicsociety.github.io/AksharaBhandara/#/learn/Shasanagalu?id=115136

The inscription, dated to 1800 CE, records the donation of a Garuda Kambha (pillar) by Kanteerava Arasa, son of Kikkeri Kemparajaiya. Garuda Kambhas are stone pillars erected in front of Vishnu temples, often featuring Vaishnavite sculptures. In Puranic mythology, Garuda (the Brahminy kite) is considered the vehicle of Lord Vishnu. The place mentioned in the inscription, Kikkeri, corresponds to the present-day village in Krishnarajapete Taluk of Mandya District.

The inscription is documented in Epigraphia Carnatica, Volume 9, as Bengaluru Inscription Number 17.

=== Physical characteristics ===
The inscription measures 38 cm in height and 113 cm in width. The Kannada characters are approximately 4.2 cm tall, 4.3 cm wide, and 0.15 cm deep.

=== Transliterations of the inscription ===
The transliteration was published in the Quarterly Journal of the Mythic Society.

Digital images of the inscription, individual characters, summaries, and related information have been made available through the Akshara Bhandara software.

Line Number	Kannada	IAST
1	ಪರಾಭವ ಸಂವ	parābhava saṃva
2	ತ್ಸರದ ಆಸ್ವಿಜ ಶು ೧೦	tsarada āsvija śu 10
3	ಕಿಕೇರಿ ಕೆಂಪರಾಜೈನ	kikeri kĕṃparājaina
4	ವರ ಮಗ ಕಂಠೀರ	vara maga kaṃṭhīra
5	ವರಸನವರ ಸಾವೆ	varasanavara sāvĕ

== Gallery ==
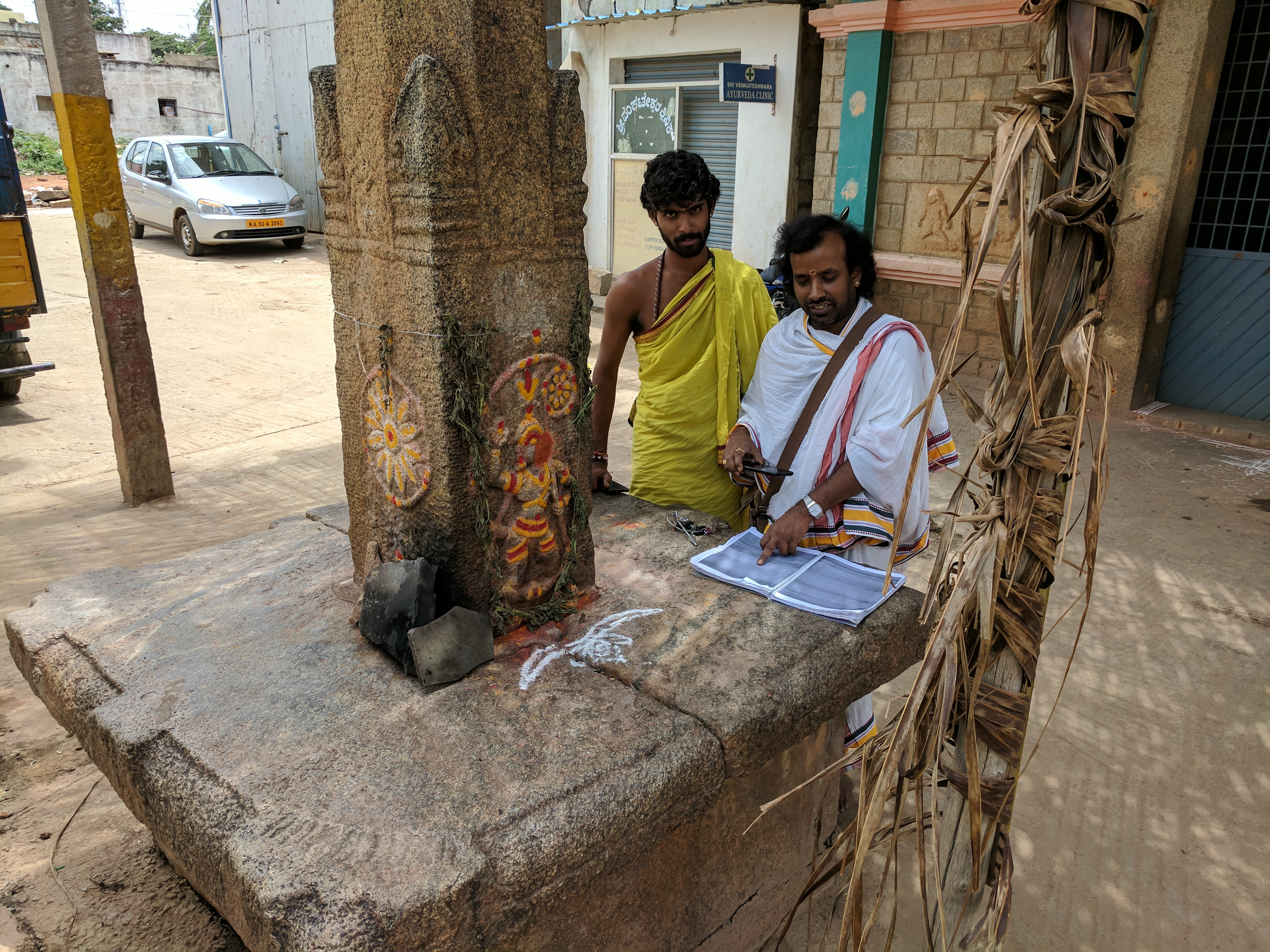
Yelahanka Venugopala swamy temple Garudakamba

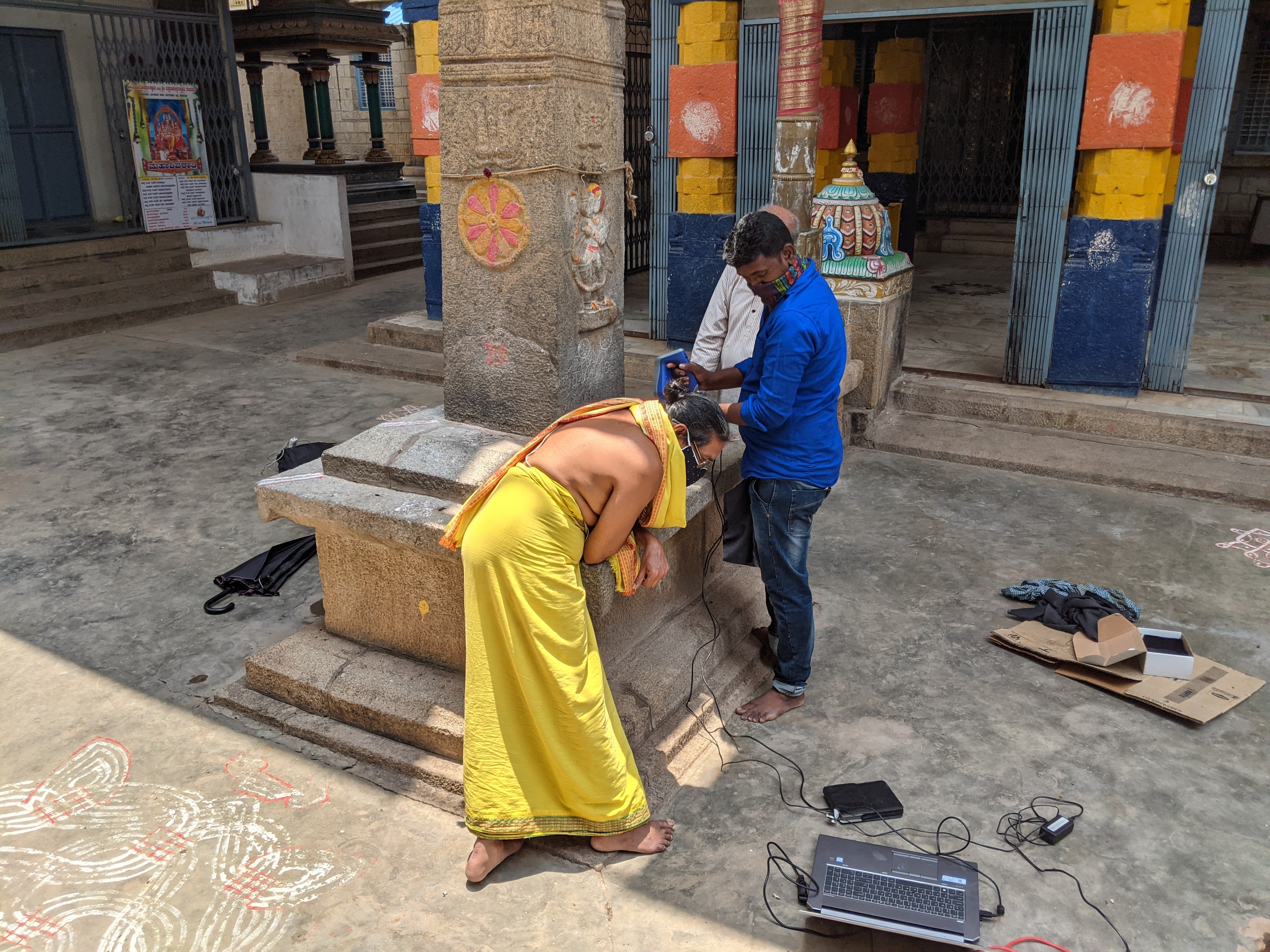
3D scanning of the Yelahanka 1440 CE Hanumanta Devara Garudakamba inscription

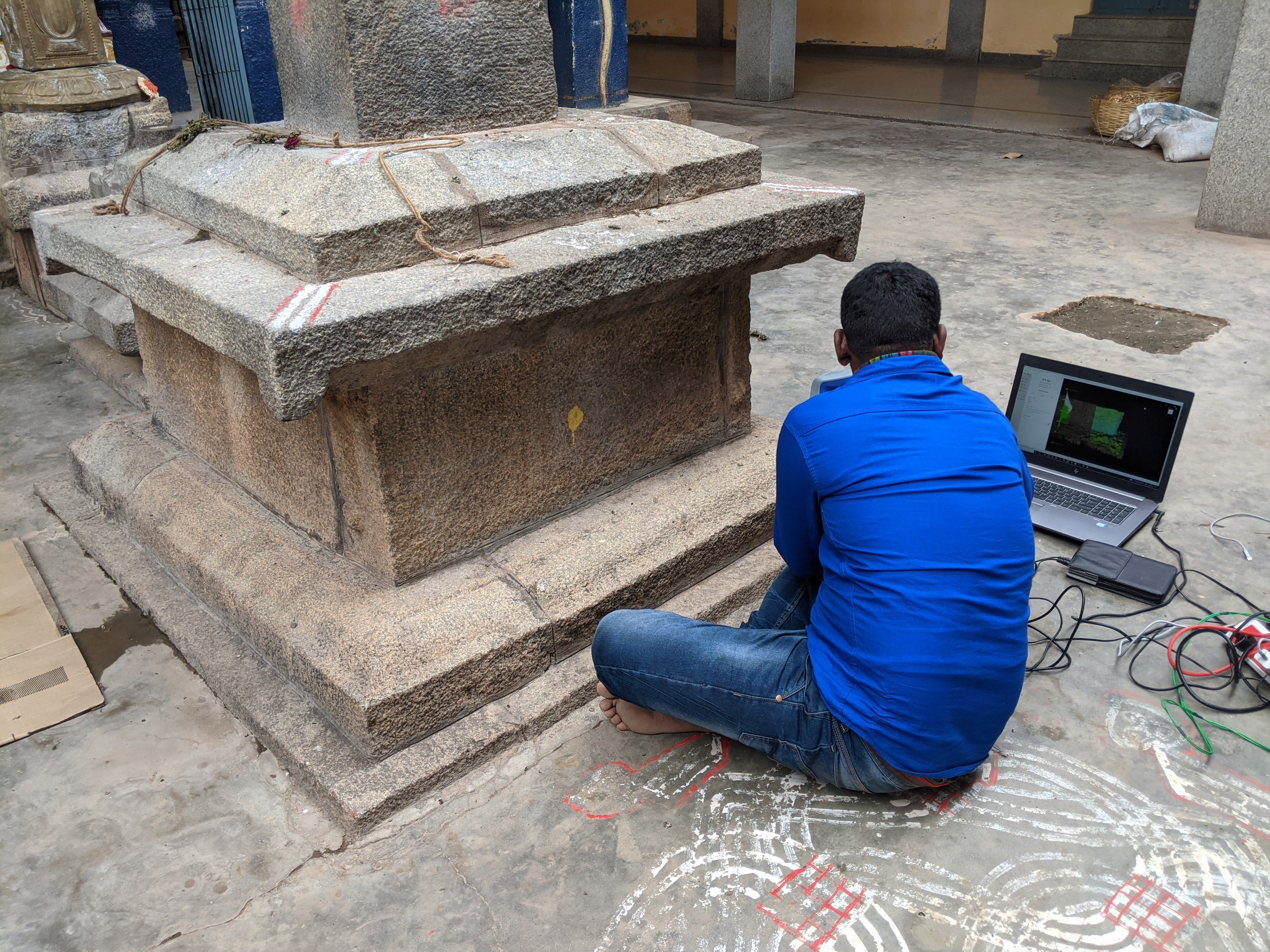
3D scanning of the Yelahanka 1440 CE Hanumanta Devara Garudakamba inscription

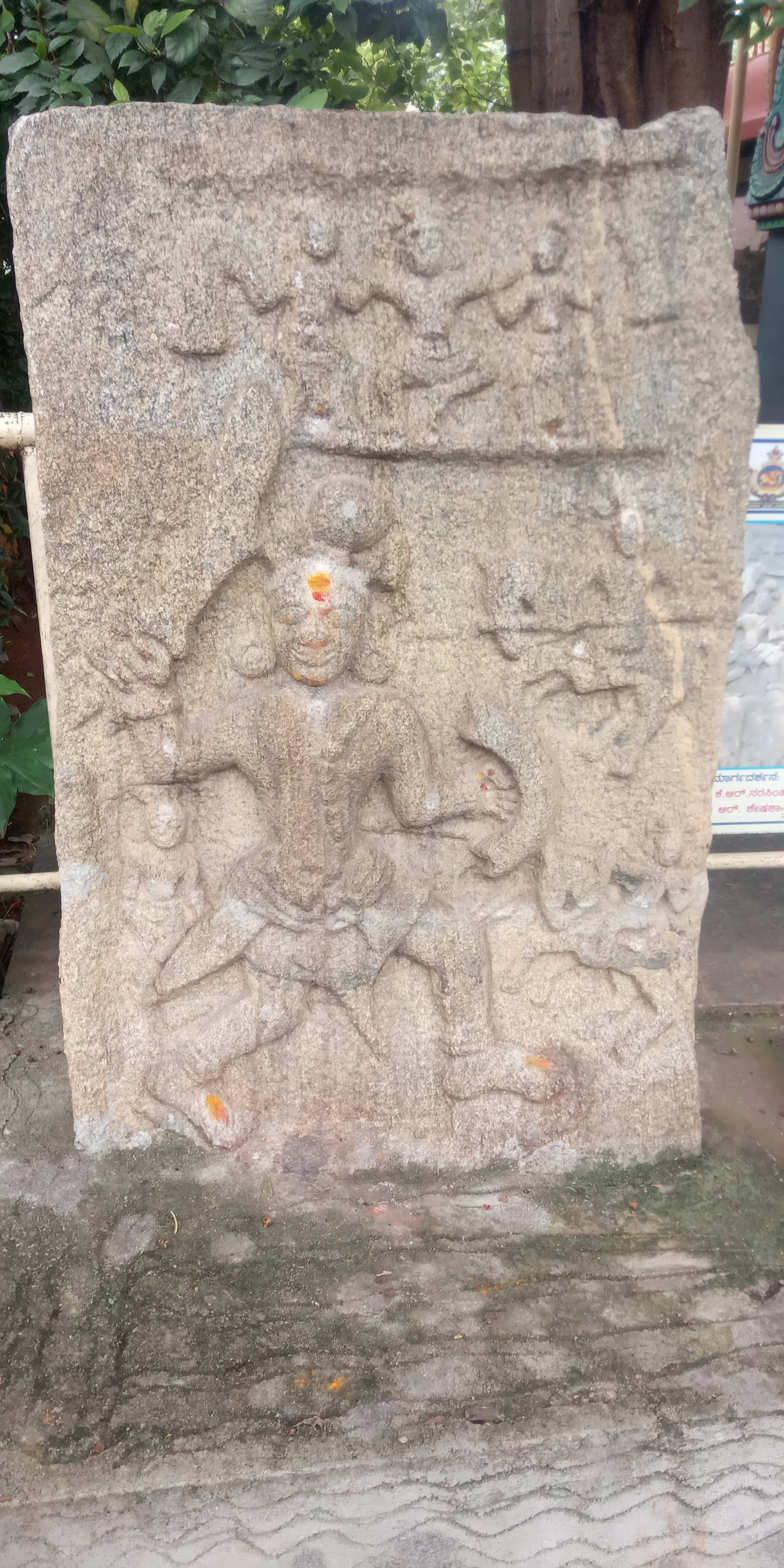
A Veeramasti memorial stone dating between 9–10th Century

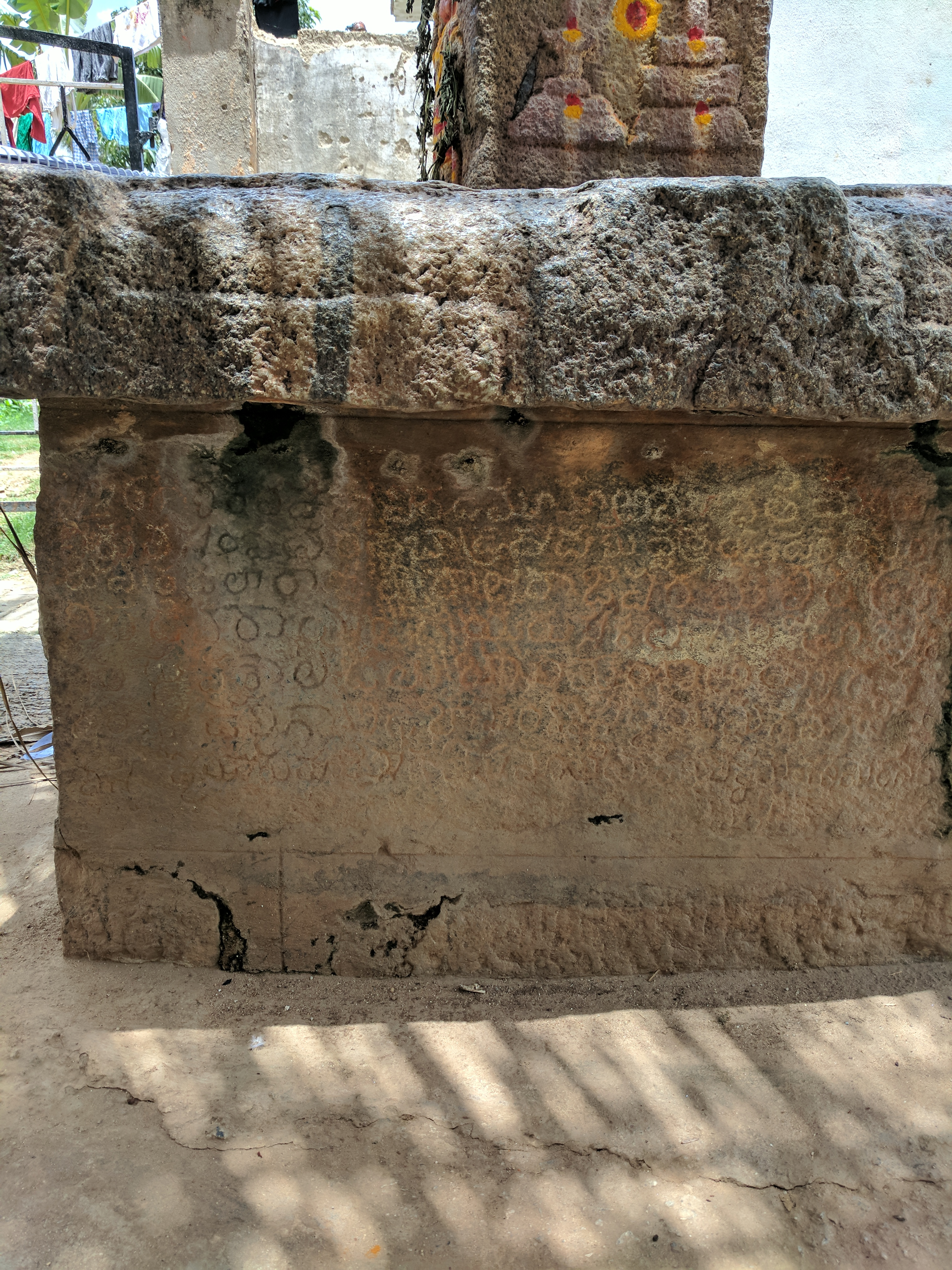
Yelahanka 1410 CE Macherusha Setti Venugopalaswamy Deepamale Kamba inscription

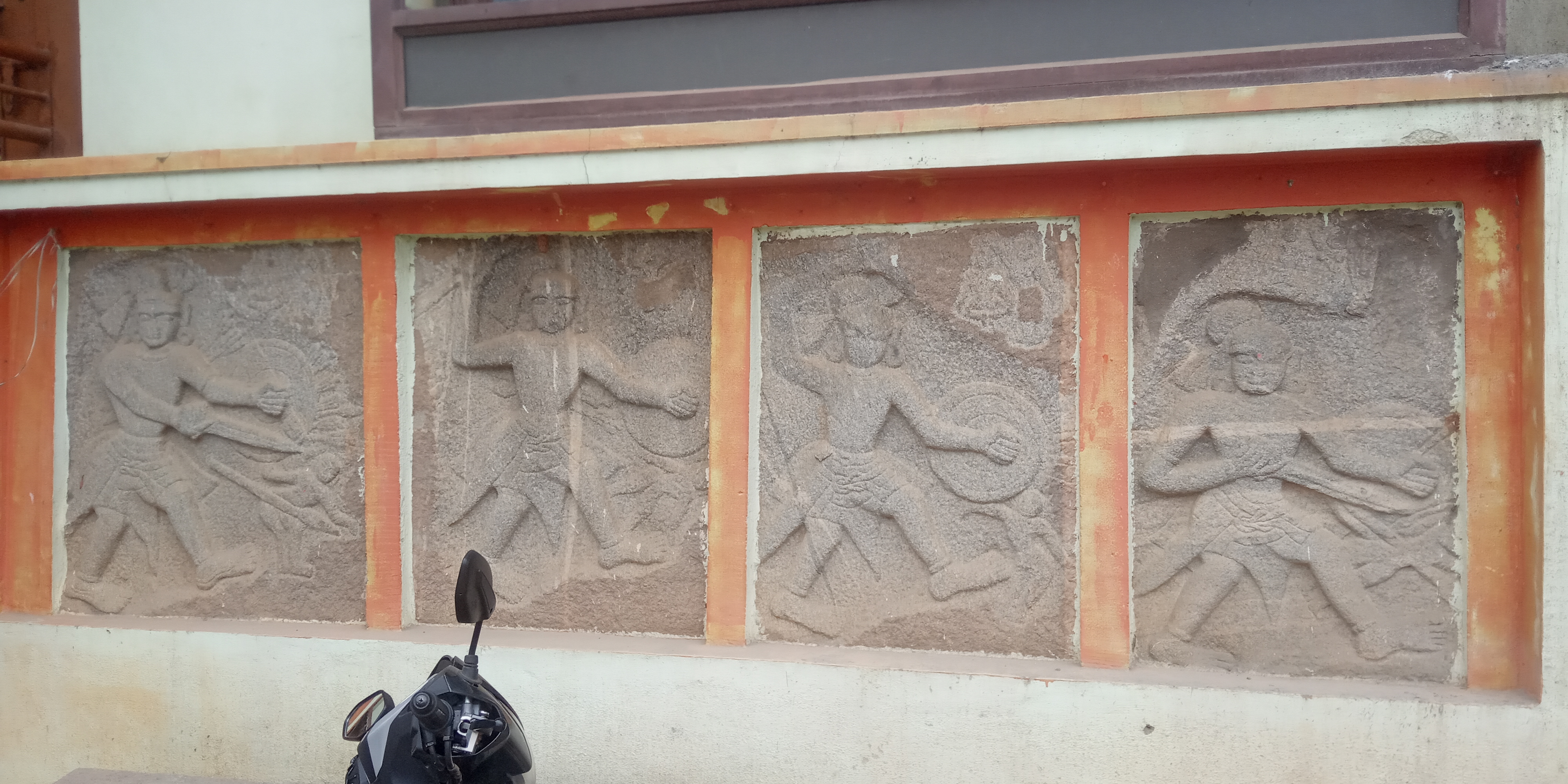
Hero stones at Yelahanka dating between 9–10th Century
