= Herohalli =

- city
- Location in Karnataka, India Herohalli (India)
- Coordinates: 13°N 77.49°E
- Country: India
- State: Karnataka
- District: Bangalore

Population (2001)
  - Total: 18,066

Languages
  - Official: Kannada
- Time zone: UTC+5:30 (IST)
- ISO 3166 code: IN-KA
- Vehicle registration: KA
- Website: karnataka.gov.in

Herohalli is a census town in Bangalore district in the Indian state of Karnataka.

== Demographics ==
As of 2001 India census, Herohalli had a population of 18,066. Males constitute 53% of the population and females 47%. Herohalli has an average literacy rate of 72%, higher than the national average of 59.5%: male literacy is 78%, and female literacy is 65%. In Herohalli, 13% of the population is under 6 years of age.
