= Mau, Dih, Raebareli =

Mau
- Village
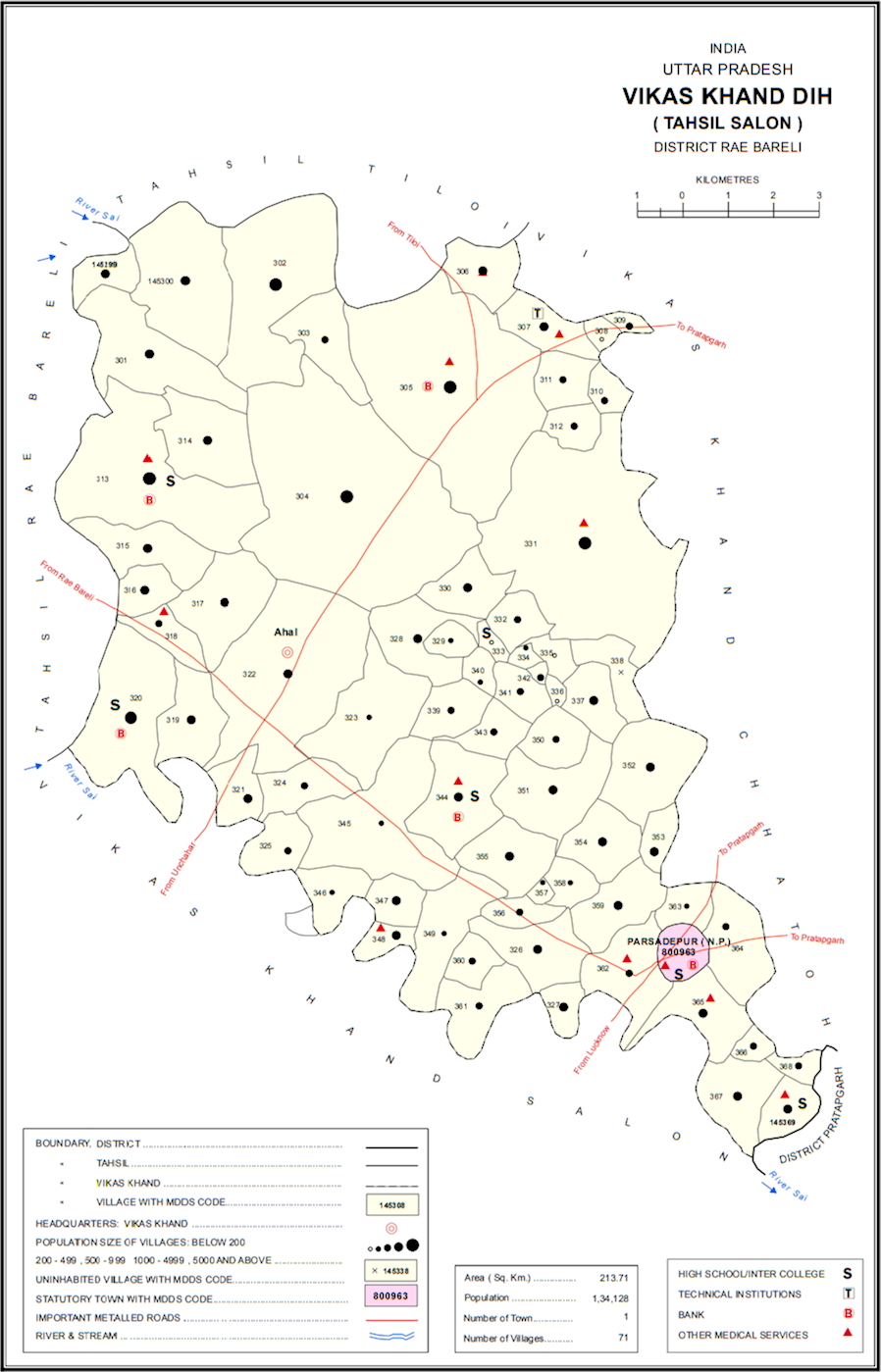
- Map showing Mau (#305) in Dih CD block

- Location in Uttar Pradesh, India
- Coordinates: 26.194572°N 81.450304°E
- Country: India
- State: Uttar Pradesh
- District: Raebareli

Area
  - Total: 15.441 km^{2} (5.962 sq mi)

Population (2011)
  - Total: 7,121
  - Density: 461.2/km^{2} (1,194/sq mi)

Languages
  - Official: Hindi
- Time zone: UTC+5:30 (IST)
- Vehicle registration: UP-35

Mau is a large village in Dih block of Rae Bareli district, Uttar Pradesh, India. It is located on the road from Fursatganj to the Gukana ghat on the Ganges, 4 miles west of Nasirabad and 8 miles from Jais. A road branches off at Mau and connects to Nasirabad. To the northwest of the village is a large lake called the Bara Tal.

As of 2011, Mau has a population of 7,121 people, in 1,371 households. It has 4 primary schools and a maternity and child welfare centre. It hosts markets twice per week, on Mondays and Thursdays. The main items traded are cloth, grain, gur, ornaments, and vegetables. Mau is the headquarters of a nyaya panchayat, which also includes 8 other villages.

== History ==
At the turn of the 20th century, Mau was described as a large agricultural village that was mainly notable for the size of its population. As of 1901, it was home to 3,075 people, including 266 Muslims; Pasis formed a majority of the local cultivators. The village was part of the taluqdari estate belonging to the Raja of Tiloi, although three small mahals were held in subsettlement by Kayasth proprietors. Mau was the site of a police station until 1900, when it was moved to Nasirabad. As of 1905, Mau had a post office, a school maintained by the Court of Wards, and a small bazar in the hamlet of Pura Lokai.

The 1951 census recorded Mau as comprising 17 hamlets, with a total population of 3,014 people (1,561 male and 1,453 female), in 741 households and 700 physical houses. The area of the village was given as 3,659 acres. 85 residents were literate, 82 male and 3 female. The village was listed as belonging to the pargana of Rokha and the thana of Nasirabad.

The 1961 census recorded Mau as comprising 15 hamlets, with a total population of 3,349 people (1,748 male and 1,601 female), in 781 households and 768 physical houses. The area of the village was given as 3,659 acres and it had a post office at that point. Average attendance of the twice-weekly market was about 1,000 people.

The 1981 census recorded Mau as having a population of 4,362 people, in 1,080 households, and having an area of 1,365.81 hectares. The main staple foods were listed as wheat and rice.

The 1991 census recorded Mau as having a total population of 4,957 people (2,547 male and 2,410 female), in 1,101 households and 1,096 physical houses. The area of the village was listed as 1,544 hectares. Members of the 0-6 age group numbered 979, or 18% of the total; this group was 50% male (487) and 50% female (492). Members of scheduled castes made up 47% of the village's population, while no members of scheduled tribes were recorded. The literacy rate of the village was 14.5% (636 men and 85 women). 1,731 people were classified as main workers (1,387 men and 344 women), while 512 people were classified as marginal workers (60 men and 452 women); the remaining 2,714 residents were non-workers. The breakdown of main workers by employment category was as follows: 1,040 cultivators (i.e. people who owned or leased their own land); 553 agricultural labourers (i.e. people who worked someone else's land in return for payment); 9 workers in livestock, forestry, fishing, hunting, plantations, orchards, etc.; 0 in mining and quarrying; 0 household industry workers; 74 workers employed in other manufacturing, processing, service, and repair roles; 4 construction workers; 25 employed in trade and commerce; 1 employed in transport, storage, and communications; and 25 in other services.
