= Gopalapuram, Warangal =

Gopalapuram
- Town
- Location in Telangana, India
- Coordinates: 17°06′N 80°36′E
- Country: India
- State: Telangana
- District: Warangal
- Mandal: Hanmakonda

Government
  - Type: Panchayat

Area
  - Total: 27.67 km^{2} (10.68 sq mi)

Population (2011)
  - Total: 67,521
  - Density: 2,440/km^{2} (6,320/sq mi)

Languages
  - Official: Telugu
- Time zone: UTC+5:30 (IST)
- PIN: 506001
- Telephone code: +91–870
- Vehicle registration: TS-03
- Sex ratio: male:female=1000:978 ♂/♀
- Literacy: 79.99%%
- Lok Sabha constituency: Warangal
- Assembly constituency: Warangal west

Gopalapuram is a village in Warangal district of the Indian state of Telangana. It is located in Hanmakonda mandal of Hanmakonda revenue division.
