= Gopalpur, Pirojpur =

Gopālpur Gopalpur
- Location in Bangladesh
- Coordinates: 22°36′N 90°8′E
- Country: Bangladesh
- Division: Barisal Division
- District: Jhalokati District
- Time zone: UTC+6 (Bangladesh Time)

Gopalpur or Gopālpur is a village in the Pirojpur District in the Barisal Division of southwestern Bangladesh.
