= Ravivalasa =

- Interactive map of Ravivalasa
- Location within Andhra Pradesh
- Coordinates: 18°34′47″N 84°14′44″E
- Country: India
- State: Andhra Pradesh
- District: Srikakulam

Population
  - Total: 3,000

Languages
  - Official: Telugu
- Time zone: UTC+5:30 (IST)
- PIN: 532212
- Telephone Code: 08945
- Panchayati: Ravivalasa
- Constituency: Tekkali
- Climate: Good

Ravivalsa is a village in Tekkali mandal of Srikakulam district of Andhra Pradesh state, India. Ravivalasa is famous for its Sri Endala Mallikarjuna Swamy Temple.
