= Bairisetty =

Bairisetty (also spelled Bairisetti or Byrisetty; Telugu: బైరిశెట్టి) is a Telugu surname predominantly used by members of the Kapu, Balija, and Naidu castes. This surname is primarily found in the state of Andhra Pradesh.

The name "Bairisetty" is believed to have originated from the Telugu word "Bairi," which translates to "peregrine falcon" (గద్ద or గ్రద్ద), symbolizing strength and agility.
