= Durshed =

Durshed Gopalpur-Durshed
- Revenue village
- Location in Telangana, India Durshed (India)
- Coordinates: 18°27′47″N 79°10′12″E
- Country: India
- State: Telangana
- District: Karimnagar
- Mandal: Karimnagar (Rural)

Government
  - Type: Panchayat raj
  - Body: Gram panchayat

Area
  - Total: 11.2 km^{2} (4.3 sq mi)

Population (2011)
  - Total: 6,161
  - Density: 550/km^{2} (1,420/sq mi)

Languages
  - Official: Telugu
- Time zone: UTC+5:30 (IST)
- Postal code: 505002
- Vehicle registration: TS
- Literacy: 61.1%
- Sex ratio: 1025 ♀/♂
- Website: telangana.gov.in

Durshed is a sub urban revenue village in Karimnagar mandal of Karimnagar district of the Indian state of Telangana. It constitutes two gram panchayats namely Durshed and Gopalpur. It is situated on the outskirts of Karimnagar city at a distance of 6 km from Karimnagar bus station on Rajiv Highway (SH-1).

== Demographics ==
Durshed Village, with population of 6,161, is the 3rd most populous village in Karimnagar (Rural) Mandal. It has a literacy rate of 61.1%, which is lesser than Telangana state average literacy rate. Population of the village has increased by 11.6% in last 10 years. In 2001 census total population here were 5522. Female population growth rate of the village is 12.8% which is 2.5% higher than male population growth rate of 10.3%.
