= Paspool =

- village
- Location in Karnataka, India Paspool (India)
- Coordinates: 16°46′47″N 77°17′53″E
- Country: India
- State: Karnataka
- District: Yadgir
- Taluka: Yadgir

Government
  - Type: Panchayat raj
  - Body: Gram panchayat

Languages
  - Official: Kannada
- Time zone: UTC+5:30 (IST)
- ISO 3166 code: IN-KA
- Vehicle registration: KA
- Website: karnataka.gov.in

Paspool is a panchayat village in the southern state of Karnataka, India. Administratively, it is under Yadgir taluka of Yadgir district in Karnataka. Paspool is twenty kilometres by road from the city of Yadgir. The nearest railhead is in Yadgir.

== Demographics ==
As of 2001 India census, Paspool had a population of 1,471, with 743 males and 728 females.

== See also ==
- Yadgir
