= Gopalapuram, Thanjavur =

Gopalapuram
- village
- Country: India
- State: Tamil Nadu
- District: Thanjavur

Population (2001)
  - Total: 100

Languages
  - Official: Tamil
- Time zone: UTC+5:30 (IST)

Gopalapuram is a village in the Orathanadu taluk of Thanjavur district, Tamil Nadu, India. As of the 2001 census, Gopalapuram had a total population of 100 with 49 males and 51 females. The sex ratio was 1041. The literacy rate was 74.49%.
