= Doddakallahalli =

Doddakallahalli can refer to:

- Doddakallahalli, Malur, a village in Malur taluk, India
- Doddakallahalli, Tumkur district, a village in Kunigal taluk, India
