= Domlur inscriptions and hero stones =

Temple inscriptions in Karnataka, India

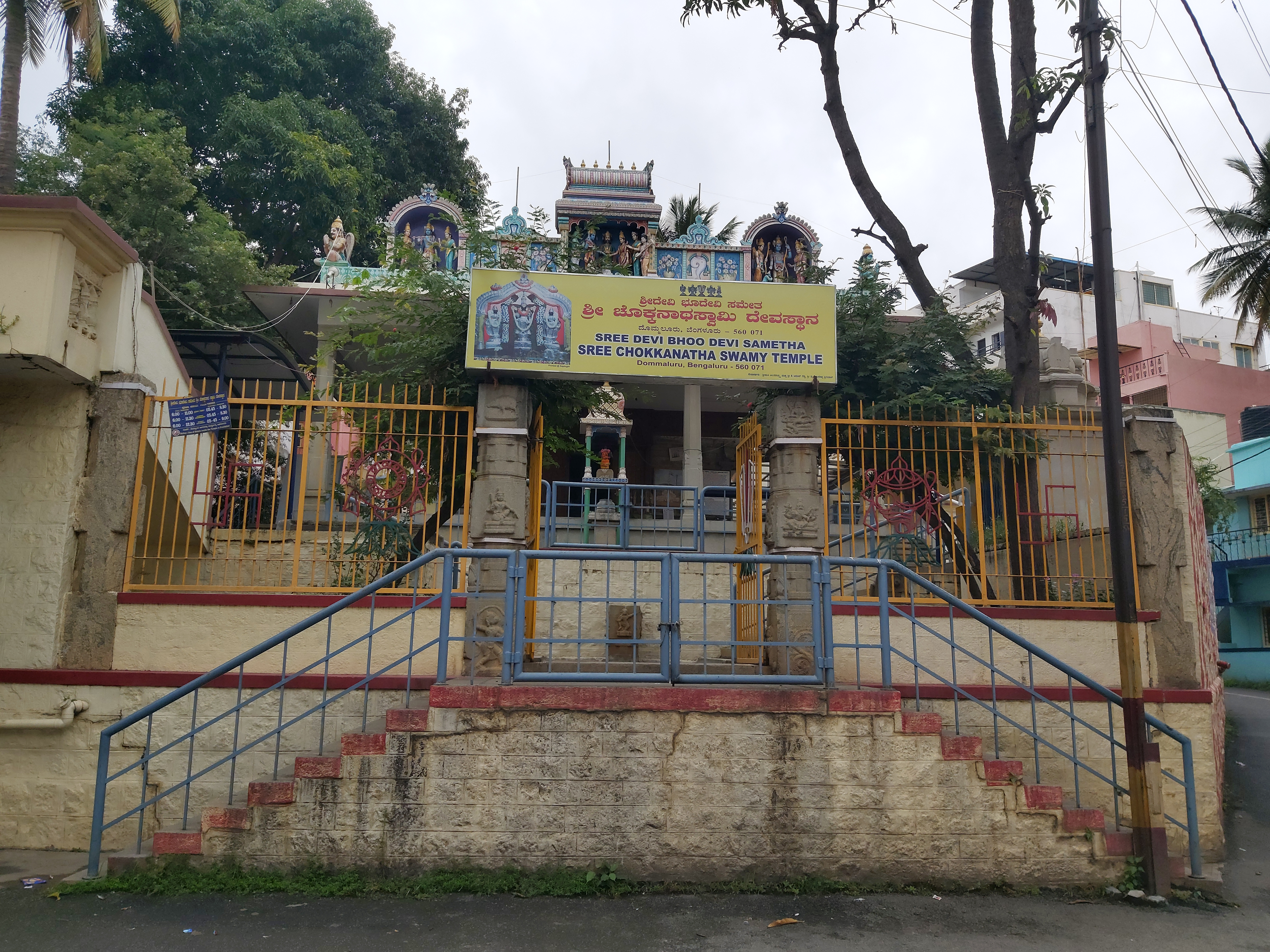
Domlur Chokkanathaswamy Temple

The Domlur inscriptions and hero stones are 18 passages of modern Tamil and Kannada text inscribed on stone pillars and temple walls in Domlur, a locality in the eastern part of the city of Bengaluru in India. More generally, hero stones are memorial stones commemorating the honourable death of a hero in battle, and are located all over India.

All except one of the Domlur inscriptions and hero stones are located in the precincts of the Chokkanathaswamy Temple in Domlur, with 17 of them dedicated to either the deity Chokkanathaswamy or the Chokka Perumal (the Hindu God Vishnu). Eleven of the inscriptions have previously been documented in Epigraphia Carnatica, Vol 9, with seven more recorded in the Quarterly Journal of the Mythic Society.

== Dating and documentation ==
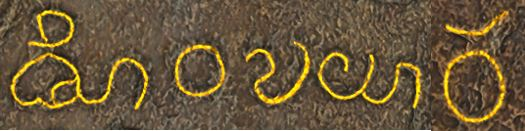
Digital image of a place name Dŏṃbalūra obtained by 3D scanning of the Domlur 1409CE Nagappa Dandanayaka's Chokkanatha Temple Donation Inscription.

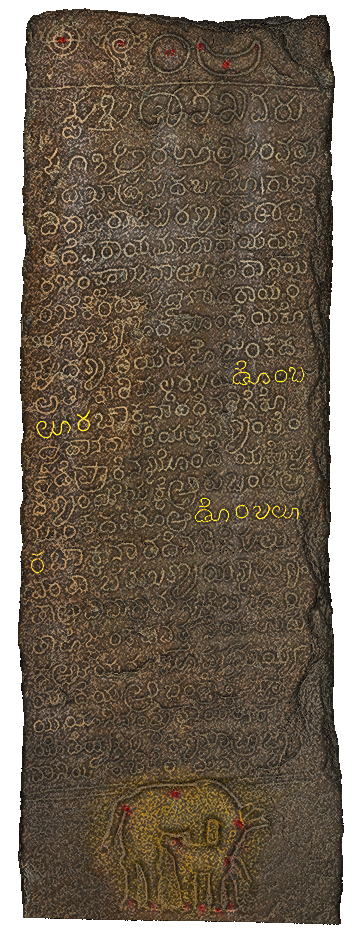
Digital Image Highlighting the Place Name 'Dŏṃbalūra' in the Domlur 1409CE Nagappa Dandanayaka's Chokkanatha Temple Donation Inscription.

At various places in the inscriptions Domlur is referred to as 'Tombalur', 'Dombalur', or 'Desi Manicka Patanam', and these references help date the inscriptions. The earliest mention of one of these variations of Domlur is that of Tombalur in the 13th century CE Tamil-language Tripurantaka Perumal Enbe Devar, proving that Domlur has existed at least since the 13th century CE. Indeed, 11 of the 17 inscriptions in the Chokkanathaswamy Temple are from the period 1200-1440 CE and are mostly donatory inscriptions for the deity Chokkanathaswamy and for the Someshwara Temple (now non-existent). However, the Karnataka State Gazetteer (Part 1, 1990) records the 1975 discovery of an 8th-century Bhairava idol in Domlur by S. R. Rao, the renowned Indian archaeologist, suggesting that Domlur may have held significance as a settlement as early as the 8th century. Unfortunately, neither the idol nor S. R. Rao's documentation of it can be traced today.

The Domlur inscriptions were first documented in the Epigraphia Carnatica and later in successive archaeological reports and journals. Notably, R. Narasimhachar reported in the Mysore Archaeological Report (1911) that he found the Chokkanathaswamy Temple in ruins, but on undertaking the excavation of the ruins he discovered five inscriptions on hero stones. The temple was subsequently restored, although details about the timeline of the restoration and the individuals or groups involved in it are presently unavailable. A painting from 1947 exhibited within the temple premises depicts the temple in its previous state of disrepair, possibly indicating that the temple was restored post-1947.

As detailed below, a number of the Domlur hero stones display variations in their age, physical characteristics, and language(s) of the text.

== 1. Veera Ballala inscription - temple north wall - 1302CE ==
Domlur Chokkanathaswamy Temple North Wall 1302CE Veera Ballala Inscription
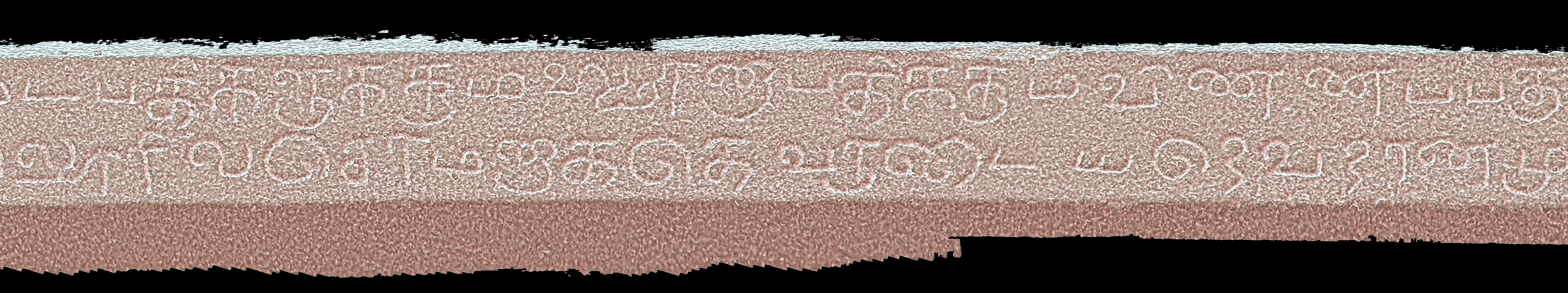
- Digital Image Obtained by 3D Scanning of The Domlur Chokkanathaswamy Temple North Wall 1302CE Veera Ballala Tamil Inscription
- Material: Stone
- Height: 19 cm (7.5 in)
- Width: 1,658 cm (653 in)
- Created: 20 February 1302 (724 years ago)
- Discovered by: The Mythic Society- Bengaluru Inscriptions 3D Digital Conservation Team
- Present location: 12.962306°N 77.635222°E
- Language: Tamil

This hero stone bears a Tamil inscription in the Grantha and Tamil scripts dated to 20 Feb 1302 and written in the reign of the Hoysala king Veera Ballala. It is a standardised donatory inscription commanded by the king, instructing that all the taxes and the rights from the dry and wet lands of Domlur, including loom tax revenue, customs tax, and other taxes in addition to food and other offerings, shall be given to the deity Chokka Perumal for the Hindu prayer ritual of pooja, excepting the property of the god Somanatha Deva.

This inscription is one among a number of such "standardised" inscriptions reviewing grants to temples in the Bengaluru and Kolar regions that Veera Ballala instructed to be engraved in the Madivala Someshwara, Gunjur Someshewara, Ivar Kandapura Dharmeshvara, Nandi Kamateshwara, Shivara Gangadareshwara, and Dodda Kallahalli Temples.

=== Discovery and dating ===
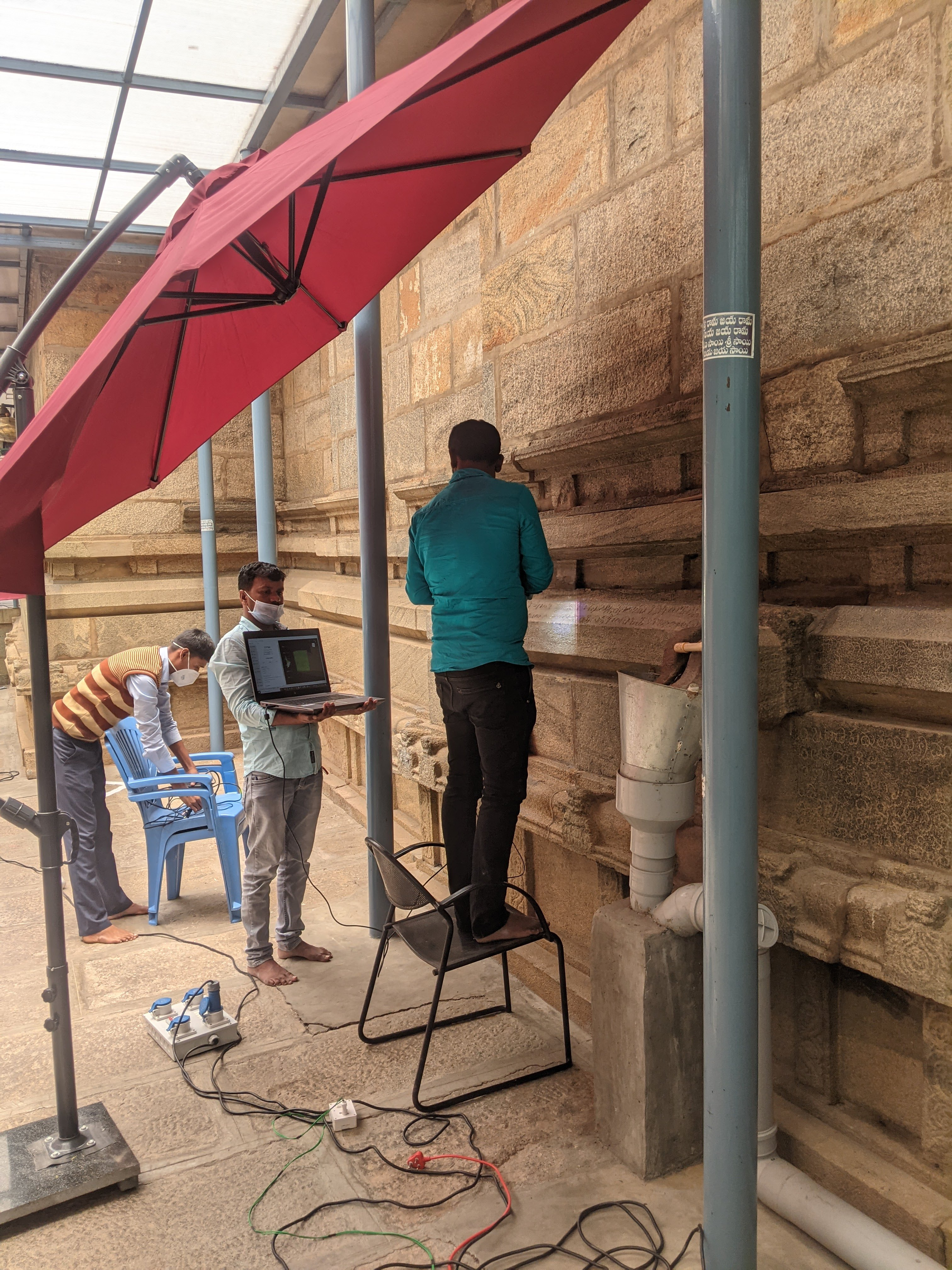
3D scanning of the Domlur Chokkanathaswamy Temple North Wall 1302CE Veera Ballala Inscription.

Although the inscription was mentioned in the Mysore Archeological Report (1911) and the Quarterly Journal of The Mythic Society has also documented and published it, the exact text of the inscription has not been previously published. However, in April 2022 the Mythic Society Bengaluru Inscriptions 3D Digital Conservation Project team identified the inscription in the temple and 3D scanned it. The inscription was subsequently read by Soundari Rajkumar and Pon Karthikeyan using the digital images produced from the scan, enabling the writing of the inscription to be dated to 20 February 1302 CE.

=== Physical characteristics ===
The inscription stone is 19 cm tall and 1658 cm long, with characters 4.3 cm tall, 3.4 cm wide and 0.3 cm deep.

=== Transliteration of the text ===
The inscription is written in three lines of the Tamil language in the Grantha and Tamil scripts. The exact transliteration of the inscription in modern Tamil, Kannada and IAST is as follows.

(The line numbers are not part of the original inscription - including them is a default practice with inscriptions.)

	Modern Tamil	IAST	Modern Kannada
1	ஸ்வஸ்தி ஶ்ரீ ஶ்ரீ மத் ப்ரதாப சக்ரவத்தி ஶ்ரீ ஹொய்சாள வீரவல்லாளதேவன் ஹேஸர குந்தாணி ராஜ்யம் விரிவி நாடு மாசந்தி நாடு முரசுனாடு பெண்ணையாண்டார் மட நாடு ஐம்புழுகூர் நாடு எலவூர் நாடு குவளால நாடு கைவார நாடு சொக்கனாயன் பற்று இலைப்பாக்க நாடு முன்னான எல்லா நாடுகளிலுள்ள தேவஸ்தானங்களில் மடபதிகளுக்கும் ஸ்தானாபதிக்கும் விண்ணப்பஞ் செய்யப் (பெற) கலியுக வருஷம் 3679 இதன் மேற் செல்லா நின்ற ஸகாப்தம் 1224 ஆவது ப்ல வருஷத்து மார்கழி மாஸம் 22 ௳ திங்கட்கிழமை நாள் இந்த ராஜ்யத்து தேவதானன் திருவிடையாட்டம் மடப்புறம் பள்ளிச்சந்தமான தான மான்யங்களில் இறுக்கும் ஸித்தாயங் காணி	svasti śrī śrī mat pratāpa cakravatti śrī hŏycāl̤a vīravallāl̤atevan hesara kuntāṇi rājyam virivi nāṭu mācanti nāṭu muracunāṭu pĕṇṇaiyāṇṭār maṭa nāṭu aimpuḻukūr nāṭu ĕlavūr nāṭu kuval̤āla nāṭu kaivāra nāṭu cŏkkanāyaṉ paṟṟu ilaippākka nāṭu muṉṉāṉa ĕllā nāṭukal̤ilul̤l̤a tevastāṉaṅkal̤il maṭapatikal̤ukkum stāṉāpatikkum viṇṇappañ cĕyyap (pĕṟa) kaliyuka varuṣam 3679 itaṉ meṟ cĕllā niṉṟa sakāptam 1224 āvatu pla varuṣattu mārkaḻi māsam 22 ௳ tiṅkaṭkiḻamai nāl̤ inta rājyattu tevatāṉan tiruviṭaiyāṭṭam maṭappuṟam pal̤l̤iccantamāṉa tāṉa mānyaṅkal̤il iṟukkum sittāyaṅ kāṇi	ಸ್ವಸ್ತಿ ಶ್ರೀ ಶ್ರೀ ಮತ್ ಪ್ರತಾಪ ಚಕ್ರವತ್ತಿ ಶ್ರೀ ಹೊಯ್ಚಾಳ ವೀರವಲ್ಲಾಳತೇವನ್ ಹೇಸರ ಕುಂತಾಣಿ ರಾಜ್ಯಂ ವಿರಿವಿ ನಾಟು ಮಾಚಂತಿ ನಾಟು ಮುರಚುನಾಟು ಪೆಣ್ಣೈಯಾಂಟಾರ್ ಮಟ ನಾಟು ಐಂಪುೞುಕೂರ್ ನಾಟು ಎಲವೂರ್ ನಾಟು ಕುವಳಾಲ ನಾಟು ಕೈವಾರ ನಾಟು ಚೊಕ್ಕನಾಯನ಼್ ಪಱ್ಱು ಇಲೈಪ್ಪಾಕ್ಕ ನಾಟು ಮುನ಼್‌ನ಼ಾನ಼ ಎಲ್ಲಾ ನಾಟುಕಳಿಲುಳ್ಳ ತೇವಸ್ತಾನ಼ಂಕಳಿಲ್ ಮಟಪತಿಕಳುಕ್ಕುಂ ಸ್ತಾನ಼ಾಪತಿಕ್ಕುಂ ವಿಣ್ಣಪ್ಪಞ್ ಚೆಯ್ಯಪ್ (ಪೆಱ) ಕಲಿಯುಕ ವರುಷಂ 3679 ಇತನ಼್ ಮೇಱ್ ಚೆಲ್ಲಾ ನಿನ಼್ಱ ಸಕಾಪ್ತಂ 1224 ಆವತು ಪ್ಲ ವರುಷತ್ತು ಮಾರ್ಕೞಿ ಮಾಸಂ 22 ௳ ತಿಂಕಟ್ಕಿೞಮೈ ನಾಳ್ ಇಂತ ರಾಜ್ಯತ್ತು ತೇವತಾನ಼ನ್ ತಿರುವಿಟೈಯಾಟ್ಟಂ ಮಟಪ್ಪುಱಂ ಪಳ್ಳಿಚ್ಚಂತಮಾನ಼ ತಾನ಼ ಮಾನ್ಯಂಕಳಿಲ್ ಇಱುಕ್ಕುಂ ಸಿತ್ತಾಯಙ್ ಕಾಣಿ
2	க்கை தறியிறை கட்டாரப்பாட்டம் சாரி(கை)யுட்பட்ட பல வரிவுகளும் மற்றுமெப்பேற்பட்ட இறைகளுந் தவிற்து இந்த விபவங்கள் இந்தந்த தேவர்களுக்கு பூஜைக்கும் அமுதுக்கும் போகங்களுக்கும் திருப்பணிக்கும் தாரா பூ(ர்)ண்ணமாக உதகம் பண்ணிக் குடுத்தோம் இப்படிக்கு இலைப்பாக்க நாட்டுத் தோம்பலூரில் சோமனாத தேவருடைய தேவதானமு மடப்புறமும் நீக்கி யிந்தத் தோம்பலூர் நஞ்சை புன்செய் நாற்பாலெல்லையு மேநோக்கின மரமும் கீனோக்கின கிணறு மனையும் மனைப்படப்பையு மெப்பேற்பட்ட வுரிமையு மெப்பேற்பட்ட இறைககளும் இவ்வூற் பெருமாள் சொக்கப் பெருமாளுக்கு உதகம் பண்ணிக் குடுத்தோம் இந்த விபவம் கொ	kkai taṟiyiṟai kaṭṭārappāṭṭam cāri(kai)yuṭpaṭṭa pala varivukal̤um maṟṟumĕppeṟpaṭṭa iṟaikal̤un taviṟtu inta vipavaṅkal̤ intanta tevarkal̤ukku pūjaikkum amutukkum pokaṅkal̤ukkum tiruppaṇikkum tārā pū(r)ṇṇamāka utakam paṇṇik kuṭuttom ippaṭikku ilaippākka nāṭṭut tompalūril comaṉāta tevaruṭaiya tevatāṉamu maṭappuṟamum nīkki yintat tompalūr nañcai puṉcĕy nāṟpālĕllaiyu menokkiṉa maramum kīṉokkiṉa kiṇaṟu maṉaiyum maṉaippaṭappaiyu mĕppeṟpaṭṭa vurimaiyu mĕppeṟpaṭṭa iṟaikakal̤um ivvūṟ pĕrumāl̤ cŏkkap pĕrumāl̤ukku utakam paṇṇik kuṭuttom inta vipavam kŏ	ಕ್ಕೈ ತಱಿಯಿಱೈ ಕಟ್ಟಾರಪ್ಪಾಟ್ಟಂ ಚಾರಿ(ಕೈ)ಯುಟ್ಪಟ್ಟ ಪಲ ವರಿವುಕಳುಂ ಮಱ್ಱುಮೆಪ್ಪೇಱ್ಪಟ್ಟ ಇಱೈಕಳುನ್ ತವಿಱ್ತು ಇಂತ ವಿಪವಂಕಳ್ ಇಂತಂತ ತೇವರ್ಕಳುಕ್ಕು ಪೂಜೈಕ್ಕುಂ ಅಮುತುಕ್ಕುಂ ಪೋಕಂಕಳುಕ್ಕುಂ ತಿರುಪ್ಪಣಿಕ್ಕುಂ ತಾರಾ ಪೂ(ರ್)ಣ್ಣಮಾಕ ಉತಕಂ ಪಣ್ಣಿಕ್ ಕುಟುತ್ತೋಂ ಇಪ್ಪಟಿಕ್ಕು ಇಲೈಪ್ಪಾಕ್ಕ ನಾಟ್ಟುತ್ ತೋಂಪಲೂರಿಲ್ ಚೋಮನ಼ಾತ ತೇವರುಟೈಯ ತೇವತಾನ಼ಮು ಮಟಪ್ಪುಱಮುಂ ನೀಕ್ಕಿ ಯಿಂತತ್ ತೋಂಪಲೂರ್ ನಂಚೈ ಪುನ಼್ಚೆಯ್ ನಾಱ್ಪಾಲೆಲ್ಲೈಯು ಮೇನೋಕ್ಕಿನ಼ ಮರಮುಂ ಕೀನ಼ೋಕ್ಕಿನ಼ ಕಿಣಱು ಮನ಼ೈಯುಂ ಮನ಼ೈಪ್ಪಟಪ್ಪೈಯು ಮೆಪ್ಪೇಱ್ಪಟ್ಟ ವುರಿಮೈಯು ಮೆಪ್ಪೇಱ್ಪಟ್ಟ ಇಱೈಕಕಳುಂ ಇವ್ವೂಱ್ ಪೆರುಮಾಳ್ ಚೊಕ್ಕಪ್ ಪೆರುಮಾಳುಕ್ಕು ಉತಕಂ ಪಣ್ಣಿಕ್ ಕುಟುತ್ತೋಂ ಇಂತ ವಿಪವಂ ಕೊ
3	ண்டு திருவாராதனையும் திருப்பொன் கம்ம.... கங்களுந் திருப்பணியும் குறைவற நடத்தி நமக்கும் நம் ராஜ்யத்துக்கும் அற பூதையமாக வாழ்த்தி ஸுகமேயிருப்பது	ṇṭu tiruvārātaṉaiyum tiruppŏṉ kamma.... kaṅkal̤un tiruppaṇiyum kuṟaivaṟa naṭatti namakkum nam rājyattukkum aṟa pūtaiyamāka vāḻtti sukameyiruppatu	ಣ್ಟು ತಿರುವಾರಾತನ಼ೈಯುಂ ತಿರುಪ್ಪೊನ಼್ ಕಮ್ಮ.... ಕಂಕಳುನ್ ತಿರುಪ್ಪಣಿಯುಂ ಕುಱೈವಱ ನಟತ್ತಿ ನಮಕ್ಕುಂ ನಂ ರಾಜ್ಯತ್ತುಕ್ಕುಂ ಅಱ ಪೂತೈಯಮಾಕ ವಾೞ್ತ್ತಿ ಸುಕಮೇಯಿರುಪ್ಪತು

=== Translation in English ===
The text has been published in Epigraphia Carnatica Volume 9. It reads as follows:

"Salutation ! In the reign of hoysala king Veera vallaala deva, As per the requests to the all the head of temples and monasteries of the Hesara kundani kingdom, virivi naadu, maasanthi naadu, murasu naadu, pennaiyandar mada naadu, Aimpuzhugur naadu, elavur naadu, kuvalaala naadu, kaaivaara naadu, ilaipakka naadu (Properties of chokka natha)

"In kaliyuga year 3679, saka year 1224 margazhi month 22nd day, monday, all the taxes from the temple lands (devadana - shiva, thiruvidaiyattam - vishnu, pallichandam - buddhist and jain) including loom tax, revenue, customs tax and other taxes are to be given to the pooja, food and others offerings to the gods of the respective temples. In thombalur all the taxes and the rights from the dry and wet lands except of the somanatha deva's properties are given to the chokka perumaal. It includes all the trees, wells, plots within the boundary of the land, with this revenue all the worships and renovations of the temple should be performed without any issues."

== 2. Singaperumal Nambiyar inscription (Tamil) - 16th century ==
Domlur Chokkanathaswamy Temple 16th-century Singaperumal Nambiyar Tamil Inscription
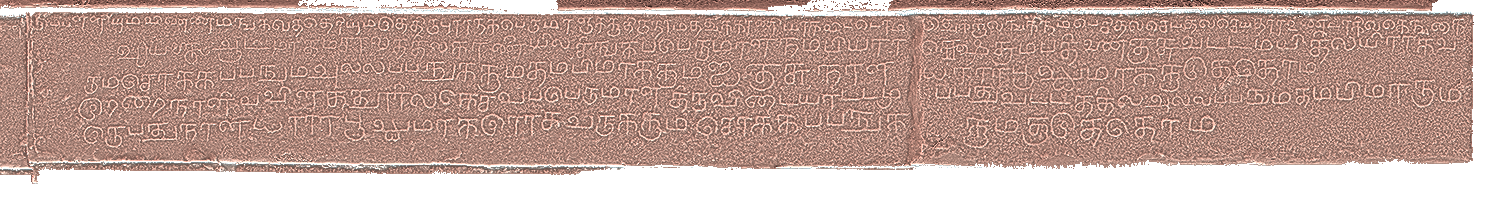
- Domlur Chokkanathaswamy Temple 16th-century Singaperumal Nambiyar Tamil Inscription
- Material: Stone
- Height: 16 cm (6.3 in)
- Width: 311 cm (122 in)
- Created: 1700 (326 years ago)
- Discovered by: The Mythic Society- Bengaluru Inscriptions 3D Digital Conservation Project
- Present location: 12.962333°N 77.568273°E
- Language: Tamil

This hero stone bears an inscription in the Tamil language and the characters are both in Tamil and Grantha. It is a rather unique inscription as the text seems like a personal note, recording that a Singaperumal nambiyar had 15 vattam lands, of which 5 nalayarar were given by Ragavar and Sokkappan to Allappan and brothers as crop produce.

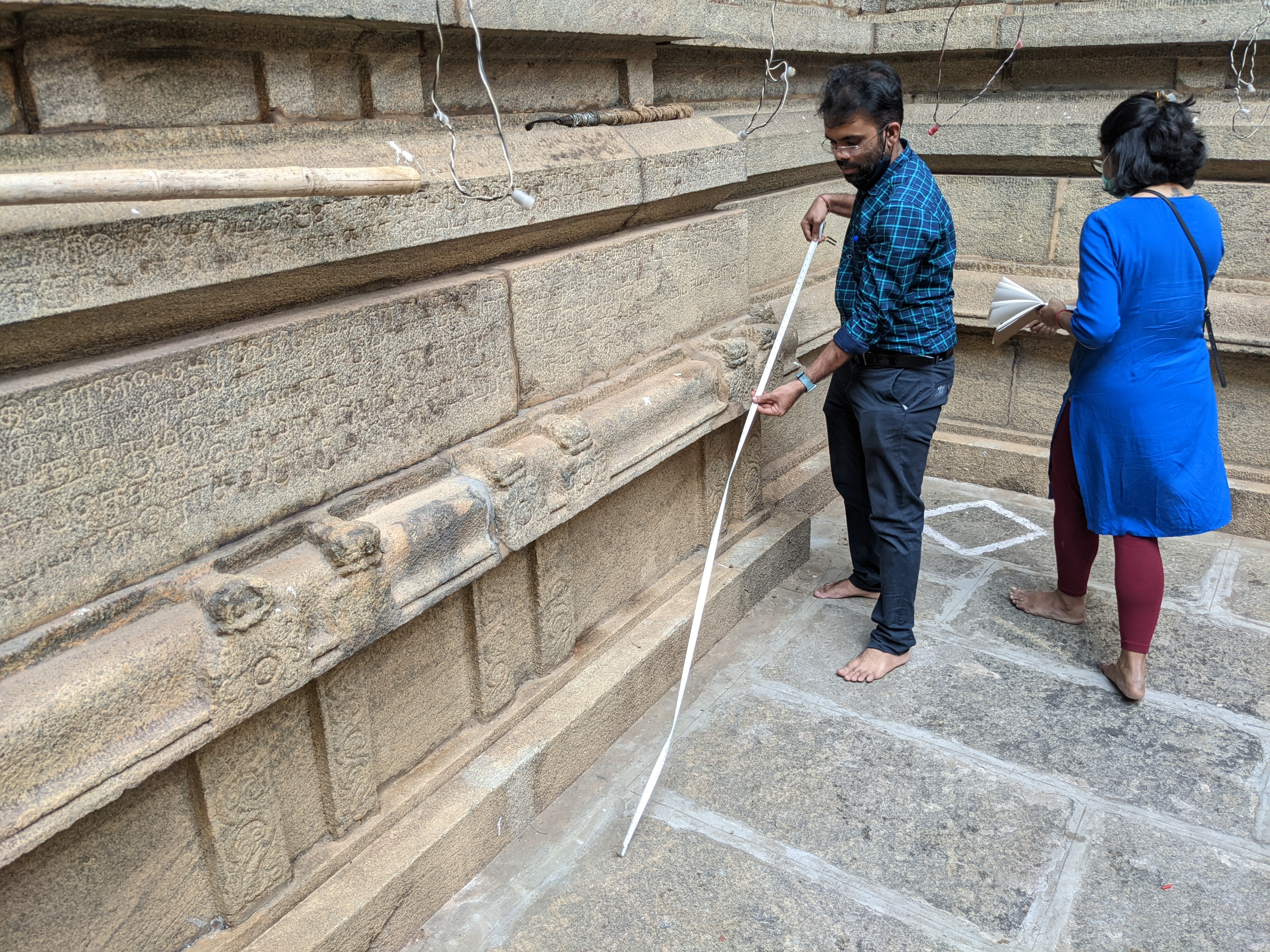
Domlur Chokkanathaswamy Temple 16th-century Singaperumal Nambiyar Tamil Inscriptio.

=== Discovery and dating ===
The Quarterly Journal of The Mythic Society has documented and published this inscription. In April 2022 the Mythic Society Bengaluru Inscriptions 3D Digital Conservation Project team identified the inscription in the temple and 3D scanned it. The inscription was subsequently read by Soundari Rajkumar and Pon Karthikeyan using the digital images produced from the scan, enabling the writing of the inscription to be paleographically dated to the 16th century CE.

=== Physical characteristics ===
The inscription stone measures 16 cm high by 311 cm wide, with characters approximately 4.4 cm tall, 5.5 cm wide, and 0.3 cm deep.

=== Transliteration of the text ===
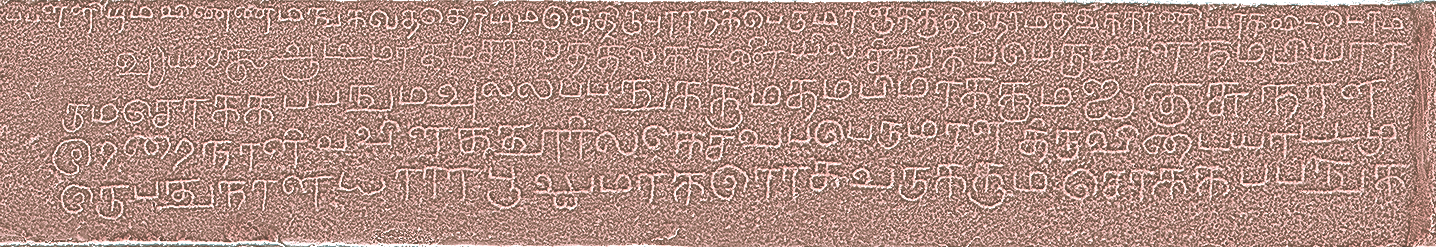
Digital Image Obtained by 3D Scanning of The Domlur Chokkanathaswamy Temple 16th-century Singaperumal Nambiyar Tamil Inscription

The inscription is written in three lines of the Tamil language in the Grantha and Tamil scripts. The exact transliteration of the inscription in modern Tamil, IAST, and Kannada is as follows.

Line Number	Tamil	IAST	Kannada Transliteration
1	வியய வருஷம் ஆடி மாதம் சாலத்தல் காணியில் சிங்கப்பெருமாள் நம்பியார் க்ஷேத்ரம் பதினைஞ்சு வட்டம். யிதில் யிராகவ‑	viyaya varuṣam āṭi mātam cālattal kāṇiyil ciṅkappĕrumāl̤ nampiyār kṣetram patiṉaiñcu vaṭṭam. yitil yirākava‑	ವಿಯಯ ವರುಷಂ ಆಟಿ ಮಾತಂ ಚಾಲತ್ತಲ್ ಕಾಣಿಯಿಲ್ ಚಿಂಕಪ್ಪೆರುಮಾಳ್ ನಂಪಿಯಾರ್ ಕ್ಷೇತ್ರಂ ಪತಿನ಼ೈಂಚು ವಟ್ಟಂ. ಯಿತಿಲ್ ಯಿರಾಕವ‑
2	ரும் சொக்கப்பனும் அல்லப்பநுக்கும் தம்பிமாக்கும் ஐஞ்சு நாளயாரர் பூக்தமாக குடுத்தோம்.	rum cŏkkappaṉum allappanukkum tampimākkum aiñcu nāl̤ayārar pūktamāka kuṭuttom.	ರುಂ ಚೊಕ್ಕಪ್ಪನ಼ುಂ ಅಲ್ಲಪ್ಪನುಕ್ಕುಂ ತಂಪಿಮಾಕ್ಕುಂ ಐಂಚು ನಾಳಯಾರರ್ ಪೂಕ್ತಮಾಕ ಕುಟುತ್ತೋಂ.

== 3. Kamanna Dandanayaka's Donation inscription - temple wall - 1328CE ==
Domlur 1328CE Kamanna Dandanayaka's Donation Inscription
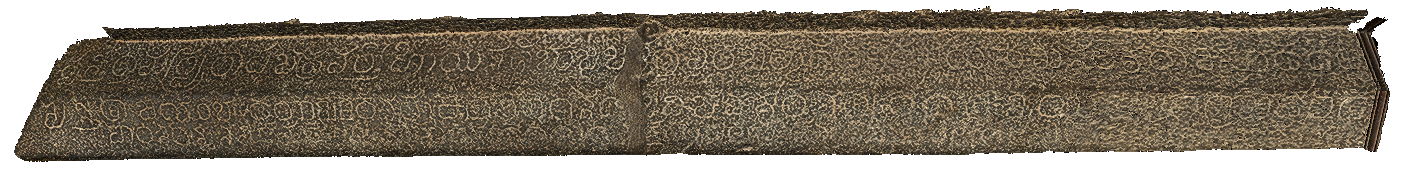
- Digital Image of the Domlur 1328CE Kamanna Dandanayaka's Donation Inscription
- Material: Stone
- Height: 21 cm (8.3 in)
- Width: 229 cm (90 in)
- Created: 30 September 1328 (698 years ago)
- Discovered: 1914
- Discovered by: R Narasimhachar, the then Director of Mysore Archaeology Department
- Present location: 12.962389°N 77.635083°E
- Language: Kannada
- https://mythicsociety.github.io/AksharaBhandara/#/learn/Shasanagalu?id=115045

This hero stone bears an incomplete Kannada inscription and a possible donatory inscription dated to 1328CE in the inscription itself. It possibly records the donation by Kamana Danayaka, son of someone called Ponnanna, and has been documented in Epigraphia Carnatica Vol 9.

=== Physical characteristics ===
The inscription is 21 cm tall and 229 cm wide, with characters 4 cm tall, 5 cm wide, and with a medium depth of 0.27 cm.

=== Transliteration of the text ===
The transliteration was originally published in the Epigraphia Carnatica. The text below is a rereading published by the Mythic Society.

Line Number	Kannada	IAST
	ಸ್ವಸ್ತಿಶ್ರೀಮತ್ಪ್ರತಾಪ ಚಕ್ರವರ್ತ್ತಿ ಹೊಯಿಸಳ ಭುಜಬಳ ಶ್ರೀವೀರಬಲ್ಲಾಳ ದೇವರಸರು ಸುಖ ಸಂಕಥಾ ವಿನೋದದಿಂ	svastiśrīmatpratāpa cakravartti hŏyisal̤a ̤ bhujabal̤a śrīvīr ̤ aballāl̤a de ̤ varasaru sukha saṃkathā vinodadiṃ
1	ಸ್ವಸ್ತಿಶ್ರೀ ಜಯಾಭ್ಯುದಯಶ್ಚ ಶಕವರುಷ ೧೨೫೧ನೆಯ ವಿಭವ ಸಂವತ್ಸರದ ಆಶ್ವಯಿಜ ಬ೧೧ಶು ದಂದು	svastiśrī jayābhyudayaśca śakavaruṣa 1251nĕya vibhava saṃvatsarada āśvayija ba11śu daṃdu
2	ಪೊಂನಂಣನವರ ಮಕ್ಕಳು . . . . . . . . . . . . . . . . . . . .	pŏṃnaṃṇanavara makkal̤u k ̤ āmaṃṇa daṃṇāyakaru . . . . . . . . . . .
	(ಮುಂದೆ ಕಾಣುವುದಿಲ್ಲ)	(rest is not seen)

== 4. Nagappa Dandanayaka's Donation inscription - temple wall - 1409CE ==
This hero stone bears a Kannada inscription of the 15th century, written during the rule of King Devaraya II of the Karnataka Empire. The inscription mentions the date of the donation being made as "śakhavaruṣa sāvirada mūnnūṟa mūvattanĕya virodhi saṃvatsarada cayitra sudda5so" which is 21 Mar 1409CE in the Julian calendar.

This inscription is a donatory inscription to the deity Chokkanathaswamy by a Nagappa Danayaka, whose donation was of revenue acquired from a multitude of taxes in Karadiyahalli. (A place with this name is not traceable, although it is possible that it refers to Kodihalli, which neighbours Domlur today). The inscription names Domlur as Domanuru which belonged to Yelahanka Naadu, one of the administrative units under the Karnataka Empire. Yelahanka Naadu was part of Kelekunda-300, which was in turn part of the bigger administrative unit Gangavaadi-96000. The purpose of the donation was to support the temple's daily pooja rituals and ceremonial offerings.

The significance of the inscription is in its mention of various taxes that were extant during the period, as it lists many types of professional, sales and goods taxes that were contributed to the temple: Maggaderre (loom tax); Madu (tax on honey collectors or liquor makers); Bhadagi (tax on carpenters); Kamara (tax on blacksmiths); Aasaga (tax on washermen); Navinda (tax on barbers); Kumbhaara (tax on potters); Maadega (tax on cobblers); Kayigaana and Yettu Gaana (taxes on oil mills, human and ox-powered); Yettu (taxes on oxen); Tottu (taxes on slaves); Bandi (taxes on carts);Kudure Kuli Maarida Shunka (taxes on sale of horses and sheep); Kona (tax on male buffalo); Kuri (tax on sheep); Yemme (tax on female buffalo); Aale (tax on betel leaf or jaggery making); Adeke (tax on arecanut); Maraavali (unclear); Tota (tax on orchards); Tudike (tax on small parcels of land);, Akkasale (tax on goldsmiths); and Graamagala Olavarru and Horavaru (taxes on import and export goods, including sheep, buffalo, and horses).

=== Physical characteristics ===
The inscription stone is part of the temple wall and is 62 cm tall and 208 cm wide, with characters 4 cm tall, 4 cm wide, and a shallow 0.16 cm deep.

=== Transliteration of the text ===
The transliteration wa originally published in the Epigraphia Carnatica. The text below is a rereading published by the Mythic Society.

Line Number	Kannada	IAST
1	0 ಸ್ವಸ್ತಿ ಶ್ರೀ ಶಖವರುಷ ಸಾವಿರದ ಮೂನ್ನೂಱ ಮೂವತ್ತನೆಯ ವಿರೋಧಿ ಸಂವತ್ಸರದ ಚಯಿತ್ರ ಸುದ್ದ ೫ಸೋ ಸ್ವಸ್ತಿಶ್ರೀ ಮನುಮಹಾರಾಜಾ	0 svasti śrī śakhavaruṣa sāvirada mūnnūṟa mūvattanĕya virodhi saṃvatsarada cayitra sudda 5so svastiśrī manumahārājā
	0 ದೊಮನೂರ . . .	0 dŏmanūra . .
2	ಧಿರಾಜ ರಾಜಪರಮೇಸ್ವರ ಶ್ರೀವೀರಪ್ರಥಾಪ ದೇವರಾಯ ಮಹಾರಾಯರ ಭುಜಪ್ರಥಾಪ ನಾಗಪ್ಪ ದಂಣಾಯ್ಕರು ಎಲಕ್ಕನಾಡು ವೊಳಗೆ	dhirāja rājaparamesvara śrīvīraprathāpa devarāya mahārāyara bhujaprathāpa nāgappa daṃṇāykaru ĕlakkanāḍu vŏl̤ag̤ĕ
3	ಚೊಕ್ಕನಾಥ ದೇವರಿಗೆ ಸಲುವಂಥಾ ದಿನ ಕಟ್ಟಲೆಯಲು ಕರಡಿಯಹಳಿಯ ಚತುಸ್ಸೀಮೆ ವೊಳಗಾದ ಗ್ರಾಮಗಳಿಗೆ ಸಲುವ ಗ್ರಾಮ೧	cŏkkanātha devarigĕ saluvaṃthā dina kaṭṭalĕyalu karaḍiyahal̤iy̤ a catussīmĕ vŏl̤ag̤ āda grāmagal̤ig̤ ĕ saluva grāma1
4	ಱ ಮಗ್ಗದೆಱೆ ಮದು ಭಡಗಿ ಕಂಮಾಱ ಆಸಗ ನಾವಿಂದ ಕುಂಭಾಱ ಮಾದೆಗ ಕಯೀಗಾಣ ಯೆತ್ತು ಗಾಣ ಎತ್ತುತೊತ್ತು	ṟa maggadĕṟĕ madu bhaḍagi kaṃmāṟa āsaga nāviṃda kuṃbhāṟa mādĕga kayīgāṇa yĕttu gāṇa ĕttutŏttu
5	0 ಬಂಡಿ ಕುದುರೆಯ ಕುಳಿಮಾಱಿದ ಶುಂಖ ಕೋಣ ಕುಱಿ ಎಂಮೆ ಆಲೆ ಅಡೆಕೆಯ ಮರವಳಿ . . . . . [ತೋ]ಟ ತುಡಿಕೆ	0 baṃḍi kudurĕya kul̤imāṟida śuṃkha k ̤ oṇa kuṟi ĕṃmĕ ālĕ aḍĕkĕya maraval̤i . . . . . [t ̤ o]ṭa tuḍikĕ
6	0 ಅಕ್ಕಸಾಲೆಱ ಗ್ರಾಮಗಳ ವೊಳವಾಱು ಹೊಱವಾಱು ಮಱು ಕೊಡಗೆ ಕೊಂಡಂತಾ ಎತ್ತು . . . . . ಕುಱಿ ಎಂ	0 akkasālĕṟa grāmagal̤a v ̤ ŏl̤a̤vāṟu hŏṟavāṟu maṟu kŏḍagĕ kŏṃḍaṃtā ĕttu . . . . . kuṟi ĕṃ
7	0 ಮೆ ಕುದುರೆ ವೊಳಗಾದ ಏನುಳಂತಾ ಸುಂಖ ಸ್ವಾಮಿಯ ಮಗದು ವೊಳಗಾದ ಮೇಲ್ಗಾಪಯಿ . . . . ದೇವರ ನಂದಾ	0 mĕ kudurĕ vŏl̤ag̤ āda enul̤aṃ̤ tā suṃkha svāmiya magadu vŏl̤ag̤ āda melgāpayi . . . . devara naṃdā
8	0 ದೀವಿಗೆಗೆ ಧಾರಾಪೂರ್ವ್ವಖವಾಗಿ ಅಚಂದ್ರಾರ್ಕ್ಕಸ್ತಾಯಿಯಾಗಿ ನಡೈಯಲೆಂದು . . . . ಸಾಶನಕೆ	0 dīvigĕgĕ dhārāpūrvvakhavāgi acaṃdrārkkastāyiyāgi naḍaiyalĕṃdu . . . . sāśanakĕ
9	0 ನಾಗಪ್ಪ ದಂಣಾಯ್ಕರ ಬರಹ ಯೀ ಧರ್ಮಕ್ಕೆ ಆವನಾನೊಬ್ಬ ತಪ್ಪಿದರೂ ಗಂಗೆಯ ತಡಿಯ ಕಪಿಲೆ . . . . . . ದಲ್ಲಿ ಹೋ . .	0 nāgappa daṃṇāykara baraha yī dharmakkĕ āvanānŏbba tappidarū gaṃgĕya taḍiya kapilĕ . . . . . . dalli ho .
10	ಸ್ವದೆತ್ತಾಂ ಪರದೆತ್ತಾಂ ವಾಯೋಹರೇತ್ತು ವಸುಂಧರ | ಷಷ್ಟಿರ್ವ್ವರುಷ ಸ್ರಹಸ್ರಾಣಿ ವ್ರಿಷ್ಟಾಯಾಂ . . . . .	svadĕttāṃ paradĕttāṃ vāyoharettu vasuṃdhara | ṣaṣṭirvvaruṣa srahasrāṇi vriṣṭāyāṃ . . . .

== 5. Malarasa's Donation inscription - left front courtyard wall - 1440CE ==
This hero stone currently stands in the left front courtyard of the temple and is a Kannada inscription recording the donation of major taxes levied on valuable commodities, animals, food grains, etc. which were intended as morning food offerings to the temple. The taxes were collected by a Hejjunka tax officer named Mallarasa from villages within Dombalur's boundaries and the inscription was written during the rule of King Devaraya II of the Karnataka Empire, with the inscription also praying for stability in his rule. The inscription mentions the date of donation as "śakhavaruṣa 1362 raūdri saṃvatsarada bhādrapada ba 7 so" which was Saturday, 17 Sep 1440CE in the Julian calendar. The text states that any individual who violates the grant will be cursed with the same fate as someone who kills a Kapile, an orange-brown sacred cow from the banks of the river Ganga. There is also a standard curse in the form of a Sanskrit shloka stating that protecting another's donation gives double the merit of protecting one's own donation, and that anyone dishonouring the donation will be born as a worm and live for sixty thousand years. The inscription was first published in Epigraphia Carnatica.

=== Physical characteristics ===
The inscription stone is 170 cm tall and 54 cm wide, with Kannada characters 3.7 cm tall, 3.4 cm wide, and a shallow 0.35 cm deep.

=== Transliteration of the text ===
The transliteration was originally published in the Epigraphia Carnatica. The text below is a rereading published by the Mythic Society.

Line Number	Kannada	IAST
1	ಸ್ವಸ್ತಿಶ್ರೀ ಶಖವರು	svastiśrī śakhavaru
2	ಷ ೧೩೬೨ ರಊದ್ರಿ ಸಂವತ್ಸ	ṣa 1362 raūdri saṃvats
3	ರದ ಭಾದ್ರಪದ ಬ ೭ ಸೋ | ರಾಜಾ	rada bhādrapada ba 7 so | rājā
4	ಧಿರಾಜ ರಾಜಪರಮೇಶ್ವರ ಶ್ರೀವೀ	dhirāja rājaparameśvara śrīv
5	ರದೇವರಾಯ ಮಹಾರಾಯರು ಸ್ತಿ	radevarāya mahārāyaru sti
6	ರ ಸಿಂಹ್ಹಾಸನಾಱೂಢರಾಗಿ ಯಿ	ra siṃhhāsanāṟūḍharāgi yi
7	ರಭೇಕೆಂದು ಪಟ್ಟಣದ ರಾಯಂ	rabhekĕṃdu paṭṭaṇada rāyaṃ
8	ಣಗಳು ಕಳಿಹಿದ ಸೊಂಡೆಯಕೊ	ṇagal̤u kal̤uihida sŏṃḍĕyakŏ
9	ಪ್ಪದ ವೆಂಠೆಯದ ಹೆಜ್ಜುಂಕದ	ppada vĕṃṭhĕyada hĕjjuṃkada
10	ಅತಿಕಾರಿ ಮಲ್ಲರಸರು ಡೊಂಬ	atikāri mallarasaru ḍŏṃba
11	ಲೂರ ಚೊಕ್ಕನಾಥ ದೇವರಿಗೆ ಕೊ	lūra cŏkkanātha devarigĕ kŏ
12	ಟ್ಟ ದಾನಧಾರೆಯ ಕ್ರಮವೆಂತೆಂ	ṭṭa dānadhārĕya kramavĕṃtĕṃ
13	ದಡೆ ಪ್ರಾಕಿನಲ್ಲಿ ಸೊಂಡೆಯಕೊಪ್ಪ	daḍĕ prākinalli sŏṃḍĕyakŏppa
14	ದ ವೆಂಟೆಯಕ್ಕೆ ಆರುಬಂದ ಅ	da vĕṃṭĕyakkĕ ārubaṃda a
15	ಸುಂಕದವರೂ ಆ ಡೊಂಬಲೂ	suṃkadavarū ā ḍŏṃbalū
16	ರಚೊಕ್ಕನಾತದೇವರಿಗೆ ಸಲು	racŏkkanātadevarigĕ salu
17	ವಂತಾ ಚತುಸೀಮೆಯಲ್ಲಿ ಉಳಂ	vaṃtā catusīmĕyalli ul̤aṃ
18	ತಾ ಆವಾವಾ ಗ್ರಾಮಗಳಿಗೆ ಬಹಂ	tā āvāvā grāmagal̤igĕ bahaṃ
19	ತಾ ಹೆಜ್ಜುಂಕದ ವರ್ತ್ತನೆಯ ಉಡು	tā hĕjjuṃkada varttanĕya uḍu
20	ಗಱೆಯನೂ ಪೂರ್ವ್ವಮರ್ಯ್ಯ	gaṟĕyanū pūrvvamaryya
21	ಯಾದೆಯ ಆ ಚಂದ್ರಾರ್ಕ್ಕ ಸ್ತಾ	yādĕya ā caṃdrārkka stā
22	ಯಿಯಾಗಿ ನಂಮ್ಮ ರಾಯಂಣ	yiyāgi naṃmma rāyaṃṇa
23	ಯೊಡೆರ್ಯ್ಯಗೆ ಸಕಳ ಸಾಂಬ್ರಾಜ್ಯ	yŏḍĕryyagĕ sakal̤a sāṃbrājya
24	ವಾಗಿ ಯಿರಬೇಕೆಂದು ನಂ	vāgi yirabekĕṃdu naṃ
	(ಹಿಂಭಾಗ)	Backside
25	ನಂಮ್ಮ ವರ್ತ್ತನೆಯ ಉಡುಗಱೆಯ	naṃmma varttanĕya uḍugaṟĕya
26	ನು ಚೊಕ್ಕನಾಥ ದೇವರಿಗೆ ಉಷಕ್ಕಾಲದ ಆ	nu cŏkkanātha devarigĕ uṣakkālada ā
27	ಹಾರಕ್ಕೆ ಧಾರಾಪೂರ್ವ್ವಖವಾಗಿ ಆ	hārakkĕ dhārāpūrvvakhavāgi ā
28	ಚಂದ್ರಾರ್ಖ್ಖಸ್ತಾಯ್ಯಾಗಿ ದಾರೆಯನೆಱ	caṃdrārkhkhastāyyāgi dārĕyanĕṟa
29	ದು ಕೊಟ್ಟೆವಾಗಿ ಯೀ ದರ್ಮ್ಮಖ್ಖೆ ಆ	du kŏṭṭĕvāgi yī darmmakhkhĕ ā
30	ವನಾನೊಬ್ಬ ತಪ್ಪಿದಡೂ ಗಂಗೆ	vanānŏbba tappidaḍū gaṃgĕ
31	ಯ ತಡಿಯ ಖಪಿಲೆಯ ಕೊಂದ ಪಾ	ya taḍiya khapilĕya kŏṃda pā
32	ಪದಲ್ಲಿ ಹೋಹರು || ಸುದೆತ್ತಾಂ	padalli hoharu || sudĕttāṃ
33	ದುಗುಣಂ ಪುಂಣ್ಯಂ ಪರದೆತ್ತಾ	duguṇaṃ puṃṇyaṃ paradĕttā
34	ನು ಪಾಲನಂ ಪರದೆತ್ತಾಪಹಾರೇ	nu pālanaṃ paradĕttāpahāre
35	ಣ ಸ್ವದೆತ್ತಂ ನಿಷ್ಪಲಂಬವೇತ್||	ṇa svadĕttaṃ niṣpalaṃbavet||
36	ಸ್ವದೆತ್ತಾಂ ಪರದೆತ್ತಾಂ ವಾಯೋ	ṇa svadĕttaṃ niṣpalaṃbavet||
37	ಹರೇತು ವಸುಂಧರಿ ಸಷ್ಟಿರ್ವ್ವರು	haretu vasuṃdhari saṣṭirvvaru
38	ಷ ಶಹಸ್ರಾಣಿ ವ್ರಿಷ್ಟಾಯಾಂ	ṣa śahasrāṇi vriṣṭāyāṃ
39	ಜಾಯತೆ ಕ್ರಿಮಿ || ಸುಭಮಸ್ತು	jāyatĕ krimi || subhamastu
40	ಮಂಗಳ ಮಹಾಶ್ರೀ ಶ್ರೀ ಶ್ರೀ	mangal̤a mahā śrī śrī śrī

== 6. Marappillai Suryappan inscription - fragmented left and right temple pillars - 16th-century CE ==
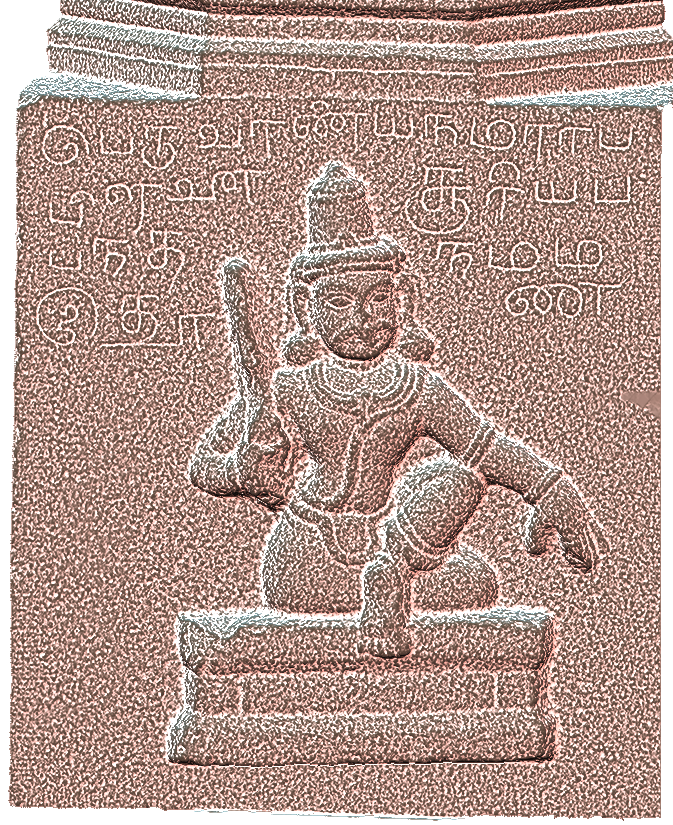
Digital Image Obtained by 3D Scanning of The Domlur Chokkanathaswamy Temple 16th-century Marappillai Suryappan Fragmented Left Pillar Tamil Inscription

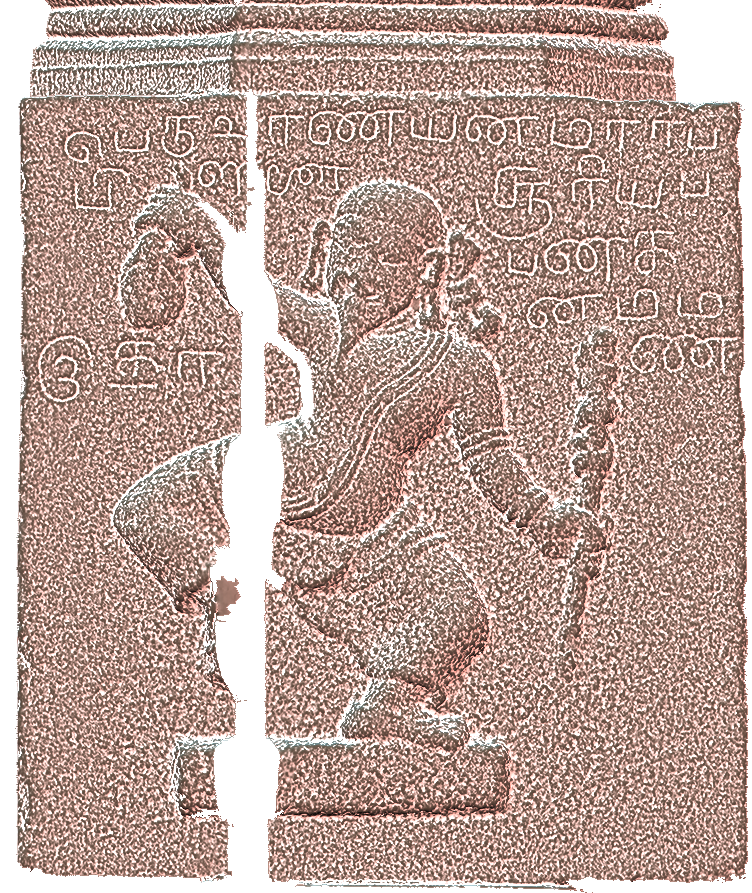
3D Scanned image of The Domlur Chokkanathaswamy Temple 16th-century Marappillai Suryappan Fragmented Right Pillar Tamil Inscription

This hero stone bears a set of two Tamil inscriptions engraved on two pillars in the temple using the same text, palaeographically dated to the 16th century. It mentions that the two pillars were donated by a merchant named Marappillai Suriyappan. The Quarterly Journal of The Mythic Society has documented and published this inscription.

=== Physical characteristics ===
The inscription is 54 cm tall and 43 cm wide, with Tamil characters 2.5 cm tall, 2.6 cm wide, and 0.25 cm deep.

=== Transliteration of the text ===
The text is published in the Quarterly Journal of the Mythic Society.

Left Pillar
Line number	Tamil	IAST	Kannada
1	பெருவாணியந் மாரப்	pĕruvāṇiyan mārap	ಪೆರುವಾಣಿಯನ್ ಮಾರಪ್
2	பிள்ளை சூரியப்	pil̤l̤ai sūriyap	ಪಿಳ್ಳೈ ಸೂರಿಯಪ್
4	பந் தந்மம்	pan danmaṃ	ಪನ್ ದನ್ಮಂ
4	இதூண்	itūṇ	ಇತೂಣ್

Right Pillar
Line Number	Tamil	IAST	Kannada
1	பெருவாணியந் மாரப்	pĕruvāṇiyan mārap	ಪೆರುವಾಣಿಯನ್ ಮಾರಪ್
2	பிள்ளை சூரியப்	pil̤l̤ai sūriyap	ಪಿಳ್ಳೈ ಸೂರಿಯಪ್
3	பந் த	pan da	ಪನ್
4	ந்மம்	nmaṃ	ದನ್ಮಂ
5	இதூண்	itūṇ	ಇತೂಣ್

== 7. Kammanan's Krishna Pillar fragmented inscription - temple pillar - 16th century CE ==
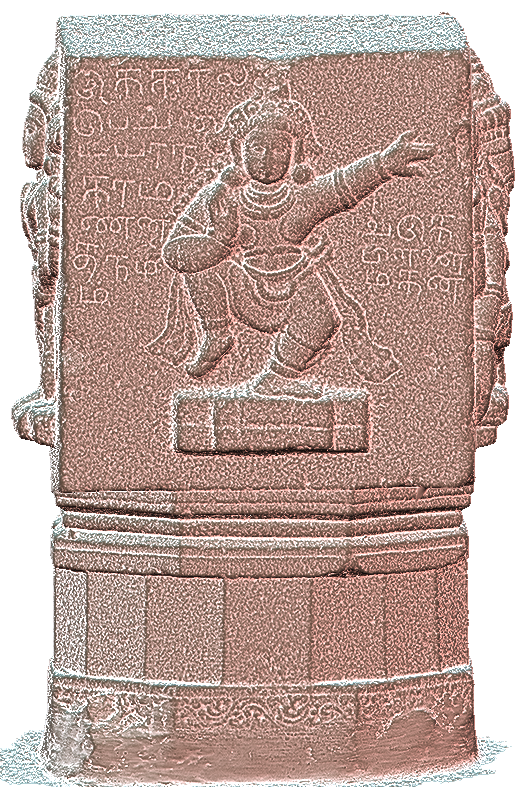
3D Scanned image of Krishna Pillar Inscription

This hero stone bears a Tamil inscription in Tamil script, dated paleographically to the 16th century CE. The inscription records the donation of the pillar by a Kaamanan, son of Vaduga Pillai. The pillar has sculptures of Nartana Krishna, Vishnu, and Narasimha. The Quarterly Journal of The Mythic Society has documented and published this inscription.

=== Physical characteristics ===
The inscription is 43 cm tall and 40 cm wide, with Tamil characters 2.0 cm tall, 2.5 cm wide, and 0.25 cm deep.

=== Transliteration of the text ===
The text is published in the Quarterly Journal of the Mythic Society.

Line Number	Tamil	IAST	Kannada
1	இக்கால்	ikkāl	ಇಕ್ಕಾಲ್
2	பேறுடை	peṟuḍai	ಪೇಱುಡೈ
3	யாந்	yān	ಯಾನ್
4	காம	kāma	ಕಾಮ
5	ணன்	ṇaṉ	ಣನ಼್
6	தந்ம	danma	ದನ್ಮ
7	ம்	m	ಮ್
8	வடுக	vaḍuga	ವಡುಗ
9	பிள்ளை	pil̤l̤ai	ಪಿಳ್ಳೈ
10	மகன்	magaṉ	ಮಗನ಼್

== 8. Vira Ramanathan pillar inscription - outside the temple - 13th-century ==
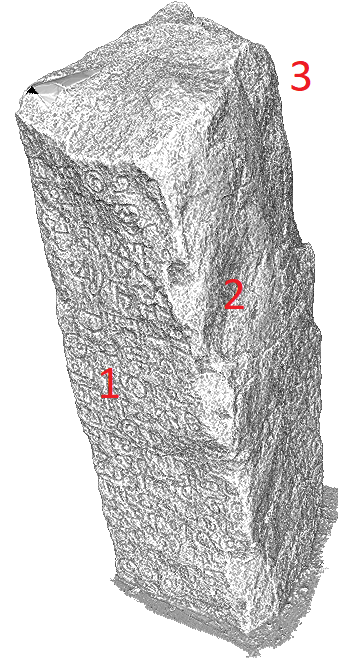
3D Scanned image of The Domlur 13th-century Vira Ramanathan Pillar Tamil Inscription

This hero stone bears an incomplete 13th century Tamil Inscription, whose context cannot be deduced. The only words in the text that can be logically deciphered are "ilaiIapakka nattu Dombaluril Chokkappa Perumal Koyilil", which translates to "in ilaiIapakka nattu, in dombalur, in the temple of Chokkappa Perumal." This is the only inscription of all those documented in Domlur that is not within the precincts of the Chokkanathaswamy Temple, and was first documented and published in the Quarterly Journal of The Mythic Society.

=== Physical characteristics ===
The inscription stone is 120 cm tall and 135 cm wide, with the Tamil characters 6.6 cm tall, 7.8 cm wide, and 0.4 cm deep.

=== Transliteration of the text ===
The text is published in the Quarterly Journal of the Mythic Society.

Line Number	Tamil	IAST	Kannada
		Side 2	
1	..கூ சூ	..kū cū	..ಕೂ ಚೂ
2	..டாமணி ம	.ḍamaṇi ma	.ಡಮಣಿ ಮ
3	ல ராஜரா	la rājarā	ಲ ರಾಜರಾ
4	ஜ ரா மலப்	ja rā malap	ಜ ರಾ ಮಲಪ್
5	போரு துக	poru tu ga	ಪೋರು ತು ಗ
6	ண்ட கதந	ṇḍa kadana	ಣ್ಡ ಕದನ
7	ப்ரசண்ட	pracaṃḍa	ಪ್ರಚಂಡ
8	..ண்ட இப	..ṇṭa ipa	..ಣ್ಟ ಇಪ
9	..ண்ட நேக	..ṇṭa neka	..ಣ್ಟ ನೇಕ
10	.வீரநஸ	.vīranasa	.ವೀರನಸ
11	ஹாயசுர ஸ	hāyasura sa	ಹಾಯಸುರ ಸ
12	நிவார ஸிதி	nivāra sidi	ನಿವಾರ ಸಿದಿ
13	கிரிதுர்கம்மல்ல ஸா	giridurga mmalla ca	ಗಿರಿದುರ್ಗ ಮ್ಮಲ್ಲ ಚ
14	லடங்க காம	laḍaṃka kā(rā)ma	ಲಡಂಕ ಕಾ(ರಾ)ಮ
15	ல்ல வீர பக	lla vīra paka	ಲ್ಲ ವೀರ ಪಕ
16	ண்டிரவ மகர	ṇṭirava makara	ಣ್ಟಿರವ ಮಕರ
17	ராஜ்ய நிர்மூலந	rājya nirmūlana	ರಾಜ್ಯ ನಿರ್ಮೂಲನ
		Side 3	
18	(பாண்டிய ராய	(pāṃḍiya rāya	(ಪಾಂಡಿಯ ರಾಯ
19	குல சமதா) – Stone damaged at top.	kula camatā) – Stone damaged at top.	ಕುಲ ಚಮತಾ) – Stone damaged at top.
19	குல சமதா) – Stone damaged at top.	kula camatā) – Stone damaged at top.	ಕುಲ ಚಮತಾ) – Stone damaged at top.
20	ரணி சோ	raṇi co	ರಣಿ ಚೋ
21	ள ராஜ்ய	l̤a rājya	ಳ ರಾಜ್ಯ
22	ப்ரதிஷ்டா சா	pratiṣṭā cā	ಪ್ರತಿಷ್ಟಾ ಚಾ
23	ய்ய நிஸ்ஸங்	yya nissaṃ	ಯ್ಯ ನಿಸ್ಸಂ
24	க ப்ரதாப ச்ச	ka pratāpa cca	ಕ ಪ್ರತಾಪ ಚ್ಚ
25	க்ரேவத்தி	krevatti	ಕ್ರೇವತ್ತಿ
26	போஶள வீ	pośal̤a vī	ಪೋಶಳ ವೀ
27	ர ராமனா தே	ra rāmaṉā(tha) de	ರ ರಾಮನ಼ಾ(ಥ) ದೇ
28	வது இலைப்	vatu ilaip	ವತು ಇಲೈಪ್
29	பாக்க நாட்	pākka nāṭ	ಪಾಕ್ಕ ನಾಟ್
30	டில் தொம்ப	ṭil tŏṃpa	ಟಿಲ್ ತೊಂಪ
31	லூரில்ச் சொ	lūrilc cŏ	ಲೂರಿಲ್ಚ್ ಚೊ
32	க்கப்ப பெ	kkappa pĕ	ಕ್ಕಪ್ಪ ಪೆ
33	ருமாள் கோயிலி நம..	rumāl̤ koyili nama..	ರುಮಾಳ್ ಕೋಯಿಲಿ ನಮ..
34	மமாகுக	mamākuka	ಮಮಾಕುಕ
35	இன்னாரது	iṉṉāratu	ಇನ಼್‌ನ಼ಾರತು
		Side 4	
36	..........	..........	..........
37	..........	..........	..........
38	...மும்	...muṃ	...ಮುಂ
39	......ல் பலம்	......l palaṃ	......ಲ್ ಪಲಂ
40	....ட்டம்	....ṭṭaṃ	....ಟ್ಟಂ
41	. ...த்தா	. ...ttā	. ...ತ್ತಾ
42	....லம்	....laṃ	....ಲಂ
43	...க..	...ka..	...ಕ..
44	..இப்ப..	..ippa..	..ಇಪ್ಪ..
45	...தித்தவர..	...tittavara..	...ತಿತ್ತವರ..
46	...ல் வைத்..	...l vait..	...ಲ್ ವೈತ್..

== 9. Alagiyar inscription - temple wall - 13th Century CE ==
This hero stone bears an incomplete Tamil inscription in the Grantha script which is a 13th century donatory inscription recording the donation of two door posts made by someone called Alagiyar to the temple of Sokkapperumal (Chokkanathaswamy Temple). It was published in Volume 9 of Epigraphia Carnatica.

=== Transliteration of the text ===
The text of the transliteration has been published in Epigraphia Carnatica.

"Sokkaperummal ko...kkan....peril....nninen Alagiyar inda-ttiru-nilai-kal irandum ivan tanma."

=== Translation in English ===
The text of the English translation has been published in Epigraphia Carnatica.

"I, Alagiyar, made in the name of the temple of Sokkapperurnal, These two door-posts are his charity."

== 9. Talaikkatu Iravi Tripurantaka Settiyar inscription - temple wall - 1266CE ==
This hero stone bears a Tamil inscription in Grantha characters, a donatory inscription from 1266CE to the god Tripurantaka Perumal by a Talaikkatu Iravi Tripurantaka Settiyar of Tombalur. This individual had earlier constructed a temple to the god Tripurantaka Perumal and donated the wet and dry lands with four boundaries in the village of Jalappalli, the tank at Vinnamangalam, and certain other lands below the big tank of Tombalur to the holder of the temple, one Allala Nambiyar so as to conduct daily worship. He also donated land to Tripurantaka Perumal Achariyan, gave him the right of officiating at the consecration of the same temple, and gave him lands for meeting the expenses of repairs to the temple. The 'Tombalur' mentioned in the inscription is the Tamilised form of Domlur, and also refers to Domlur as 'desimanickapattanam'.The Domlur Lake mentioned in the inscription might be the land where the TERI building exists today. The text of this inscription as documented in the Epigraphia Carnatica continues further with the text, possibly that of an unrelated inscription, namery a donatory inscription by an Allala Nambiyar who made a gift of one-third of his land to Tombalur Savari Perumal Nambiyar.

=== Transliteration of the text ===
The text of the transliteration is published in Epigraphia Carnatica Volume 9.

"Svasti Sri Sakarai-yandu ayirattu-oru-noorenbadu senra Kshaya-varushattu Sittirai-inadam padinelindiyadi Aditya Hastattu nal Rajendra-Sola-vala-nattu, Ilaippakka-nattu Tombalur ana Desimanikkapattinattu Talaikkattu Yiravi Tripurantaka-settiyarum Parpati-settichchiyarum Nambi Yiravi-settiyarkum Srideviyakkanukkum yi-vanstttil ullarkum punaravrittiy-illamaikkum Tribhuvanamalla Vembi-devarkum yivar varnattil ullarkum tolukkum vajukkum nanr-agavum tiruv-iradanah-gond-aruluvad-aga i-Tripurantaka-settiyar tiru-pratishthai-pannin a nayanar Tripurantakapperumalukku-ttirunamattu-kkaniy-aga vitta Jalappalli nansey punsey nay-pal-ellaiyum Vinnamangalatt-eriyum Torabalur periya yeriyd kalini panniru-kandagamum i-kkovil kaniyalan Iramapiran Allala-nambiyarukku archana-vrtti Vanniyakatta mariyadi-kuduttu kandaga-kolaiyum kuduttu Talai Sankarappariyan Tillai nayagan marumagan Manali Tripurantaka-pperumal-asariyar ivanukku i-ttiru-murram iidaki-prananam aga kshetrara-kudutten pratishthasarimaiyum periy-eri-kil-ppsanam koiai vilaiya aru-kandaga-kkalaniyun-gaudaga-kkollaiyum raajrura ullanavum puduppanikke tiruppadigal opadi kuli idavum ivan makkal makkal santraditya-varai sella kudutten Manali Tripurantaka-perumal-asarikku i-kkoyilir-kaniyalan Kundaaiyir-Kaduvanudaiyan Suriyan Sambandarukku Sanduppatti kalani iru-kandagamum . . . ndalinpatti yiru-kandagamura Uvachchapatti kandagamum eraberuman adiyarku ivv-eriyil kalani aru-kandagam idil terkku kalani kandagamum Sokkaperumal Manikkattukku kandagam i-nnayanar tirumadaivilagamum sannadi-teruvumaga peri-eriyil kalani muppadin-kan. . . . . . . kkaraiyil kurar-pasuvaiyum Piramanaraiyum konra papatte kallum Kaveriyum pullum pumiyura ulladanaiyum Brahma-karppam ulladanaiyum vishthaiyille krimiy-ay senikkakadavvakkal

Allala-nambiyar Tombalur ennudaiya kaniyil Savaripperuraal-nambiyarukku danam aga munrattonru kudutten".

=== Translation in English ===
The text of the translation is published in Epigraphia Carnatica Volume 9.

"(On the date specified), I, Talaikkatu Iravi Tripurantaka Settiyar of Tombalur, alias Tesimanikka-pattanam in Ilaippakka-nattu of Rajendra-Sola-vala-nadu, along with (my wife) Parpatisettichchiyar, granted, as tax-free temple property, for the god Tripurantaka-pperumal, set up by myself, — so that he might be worshipped to save from re-birth Nambi Iravi-settiyar, (his wife) Srideviyakka and their descendants, and for victory to the arm and sword of Tribhuvanamalla Vembi-deva and his descendants, the wet and dry lands with their four boundaries in the village of Jalappalli, the tank at Vinnamangalam and certain other lands (specified) below the big tank of Tombalur, and made them over, along with some other lands (specified), to the holder of the temple land, Irama-piran Allala-nambiyar, for conducting the worship. I also gave over, with pouring of water, the charge of this temple to Talai Sankarappachariyan Tillainayagan's nephew Manali Tripurantaka-pperumal-achariyan, granted him the right of officiating at consecration, and gave him, for meeting the expenses of repairs to the temple, certain lands (specified) to descend to his sons and grandsons for as long as the moon and the sun exist. Further, I granted certain lands (specified in each case) to the holder of the temple land, Kaduvanudaiyan Suriyan Sambandar, to the temple servants and to Sokkapperumal Manikkam. . . . . . . . .

"(Those who violate this charity) shall incur the sin of having slaughtered tawny cows and Brahmans on the banks (of the Ganges), and shall be born worms in ordure for as long as the rocks, the Kaveri, the grass and the earth endure, and the Brahma-kalpa lasts.

"I, Allaja-nambiyar, made a gift of one-third of my land in Tombalur to Savari-pperumal-nambiyar".

== 10. Sella Pillai inscription - temple wall - 1290CE ==
This hero stone bears a Tamil inscription in Grantha characters of a 1290CE donatory inscription which was made by the Hoysala King Veera Ramanada Deva (Vira Ramanatha Deva) after a petition made by the residents of Ilaipakka Nadu, a Sella Pillai, the temple-manager Nalandigal Narayana Tadar, and other people as well, that funds were insufficient for the temple management. As a result, the king ordered a part of the tax collected by Tombalur to be given to the temple itself. The Ilaipakka Naadu mentioned in the inscription was an administrative unit corresponding to present-day Yelahanka in North Bengaluru. The inscription is published in the Epigraphia Carnatica Volume 9, although the present status of the inscription is unknown.

=== Transliteration of the text ===
The text of the transliteration is published in the Epigraphia Carnatica Volume 9.

"svasti . . . . . .ysala-vira-Ramanada-Devarku yandu muppattu-aravadu Arpasi-madam padina. .... tiyadi Ilaippakka-nattu-nattavarum Kanda-chchettiyarum Nam. . . . . . .rum adikari Sellappillaiyum devar sibarittai Tombalur Sokkappe. . . . .kku tirunal-alivukku porad-enru vinnappanyya i-kovilil kkariyan-jeyar Nalandigal Narayana-tadar vinnappan-jeya devarum Tomb. . . r irukkum ponl mudalil pattu ponl mudalil vitten vira-Iramanada-Devarena yi-ttanmatai alivu-seydar undagi Gengai-kkaraiyil kura-ppasuvai konran pavatte pugakadavargal"

=== Translation in English ===
The translation of the inscription is published in Epigraphia Carnatica Volume 9.

"In the 36th year of the reign of Poysala vira-Ramanada-Devar, On a petition being made by the inhabitants of Ilaippakka-nadu, the officer Sella-pillai, the temple-manager Nalandigal Narayana-tadar and some others (named), to the effect that the provision made for the expenses for festivals of the god Sokkapperumal of Tombalur is inadequate, the king remitted (on the date specified) 10 pon out of the amount that was being paid by (the village of) Tombalur. Usual final imprecatory sentence."

== 11. Panchala inscription - temple wall - 14th Century CE ==
This hero stone bears a mostly incomplete Tamil inscription in Grantha characters regardingf the carpenters and Panchalas (craftsmen) made in front of the deity Chokkanathaswamy. It was published in Epigraphia Carnatica Volume 9, but the present status of the inscription is unknown.

=== Transliteration of the text ===
The transliteration of the inscription is published in the Epigraphia Carnatica Volume 9.

"svasti sri upajivana-katrinam samasta-vrita-vasinam arkkasalam paran-daivam baudyame daiva-sasanam sadhanam rathakaranam etat trailokya-bhushanara samasta-va. . . . . . .ttarum samasta-panchalattarum Sokkapperumal tiru-munbe kuraiv-ara-kkudi sthira-sasanam-panninapadi nadugalil."

=== Translation ===
The translation of the inscription is published in Epigraphia Carnatica Volume 9.

"This is the Daiva-sasana of the followers of different callings. This edict of the carpenters is the ornament of the three worlds. ...

"The following is the permanent agreement made by all the Panchalas who had assembled, without a vacancy the assembly, in front of the god Sokkapperumal, In the nadus. ..."

== 12. Talaikkatu Iravi Tripurantaka Settiyar Lamp inscription - temple wall - 13th Century CE ==
This hero stone bears a Tamil inscription in Grantha characters which records a 13th century CE donation of money for two lamps made by a Talaikkatu Iravi Tripurantaka Settiyar to the temple. It was published in Epigraphia Carnatica Volume 9, but the present status of the inscription is unknown.

=== Transliteration of the text ===
The transliteration of the inscription is published in the Epigraphia Carnatica Volume 9.

"svasti sri Irajaraja-Sola-vala-nattu llaippakka-nattu Tombalur ana Desimanikkapatanattu Tiripurantaka-pperumal Embe-devar kattina kattupadi iratti-madattuku tiru-vilaku pana 5"

=== Translation in English ===
The translation of the inscription is published in the Epigraphia Carnatica Volume 9.

"According to the stipulation made by Tripurantaka-perumal Enbe devar of Tombalur, alias Tesimanikka-pattanam, of Ilaippakka-nadu in Irajaraja-Sola-vala-nadu, five panams (are sanctioned) for lamps for two months."

== Gallery ==
Inscriptions and Hero Stones of Domluru
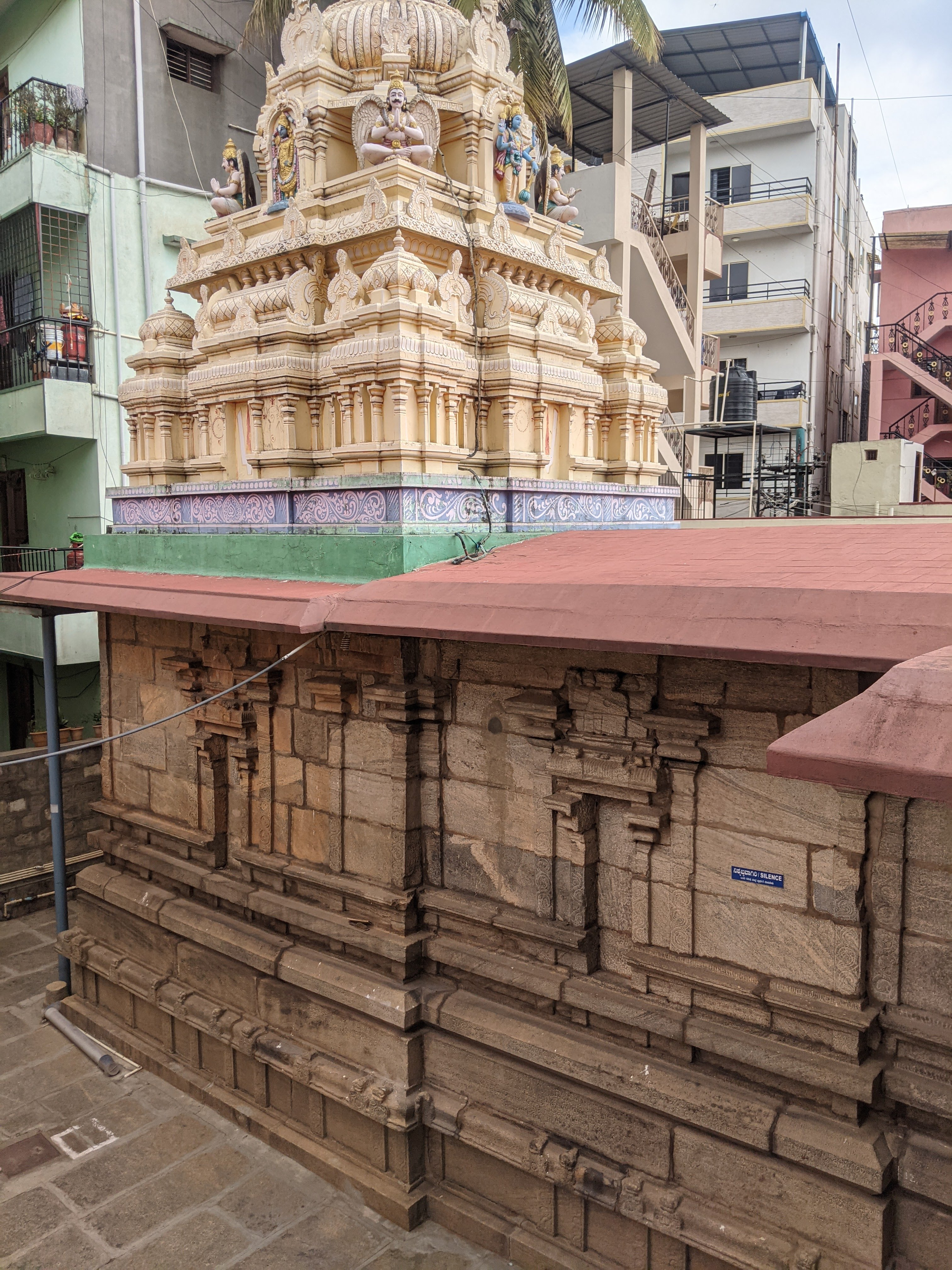
Domlur Chokkanathaswamy Temple North Wall

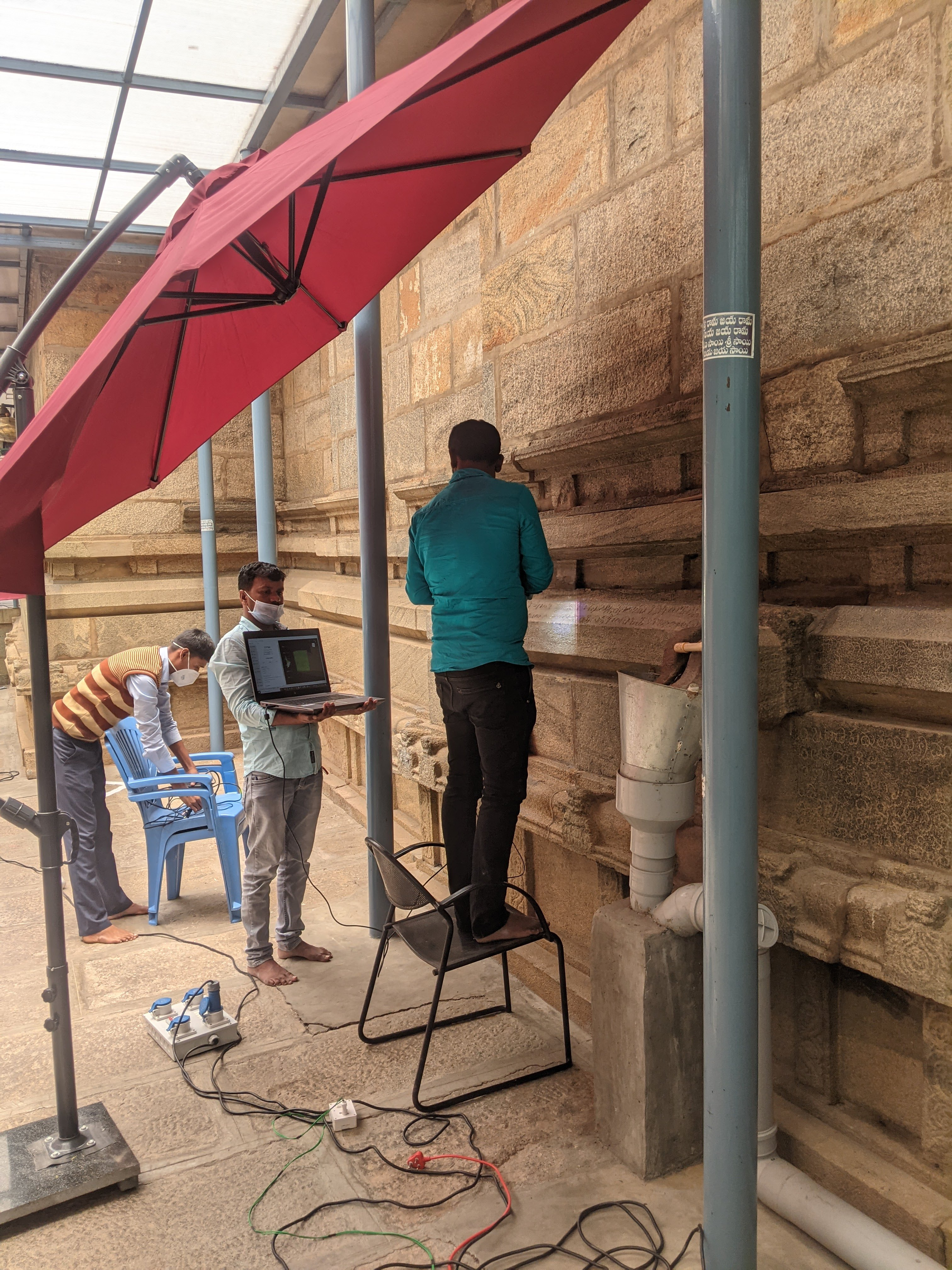
3D scanning of the North Wall 1302CE Veera Ballala Inscription (Tamil)

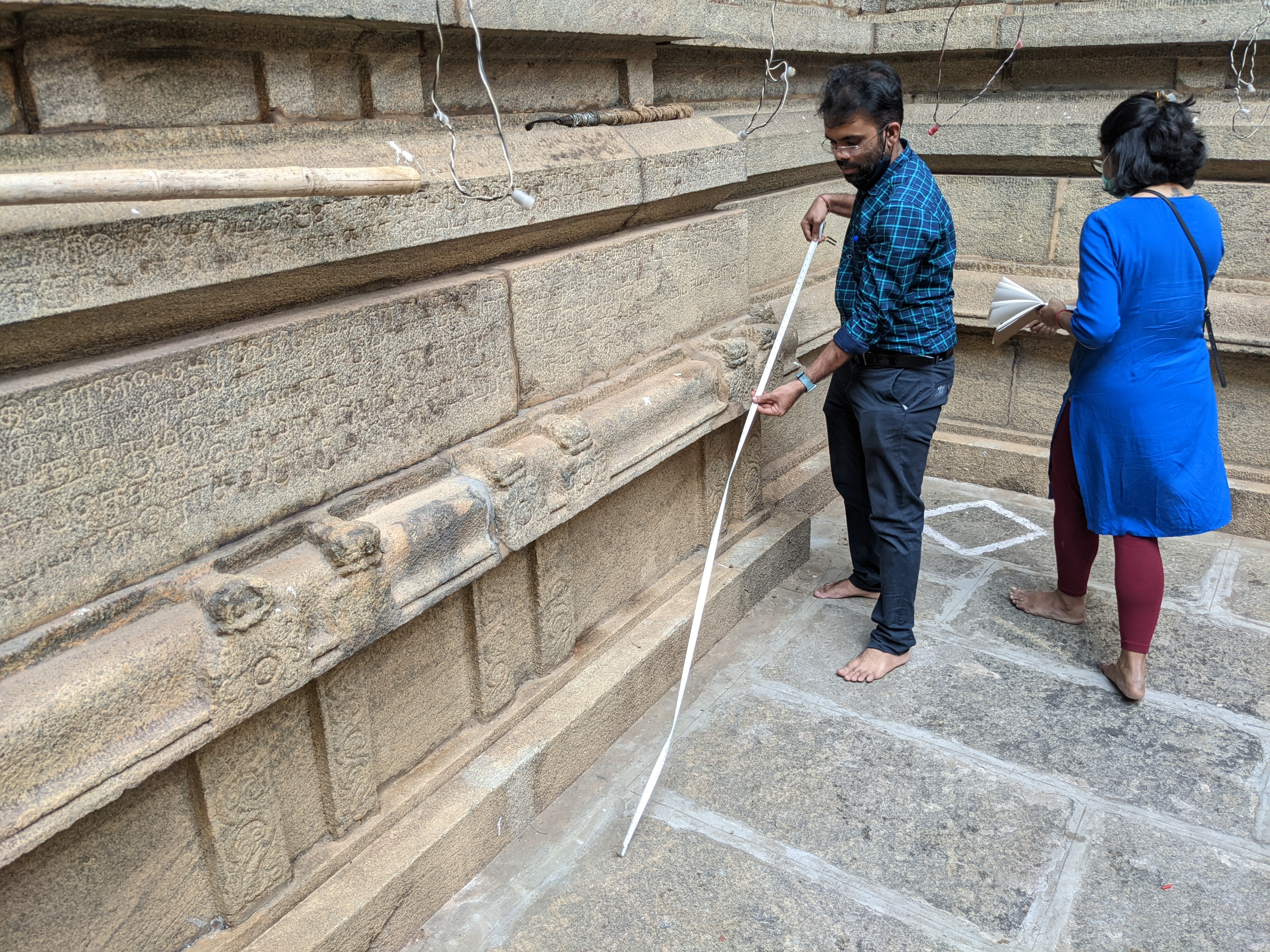
Singaperumal Nambiyar Tamil Inscription

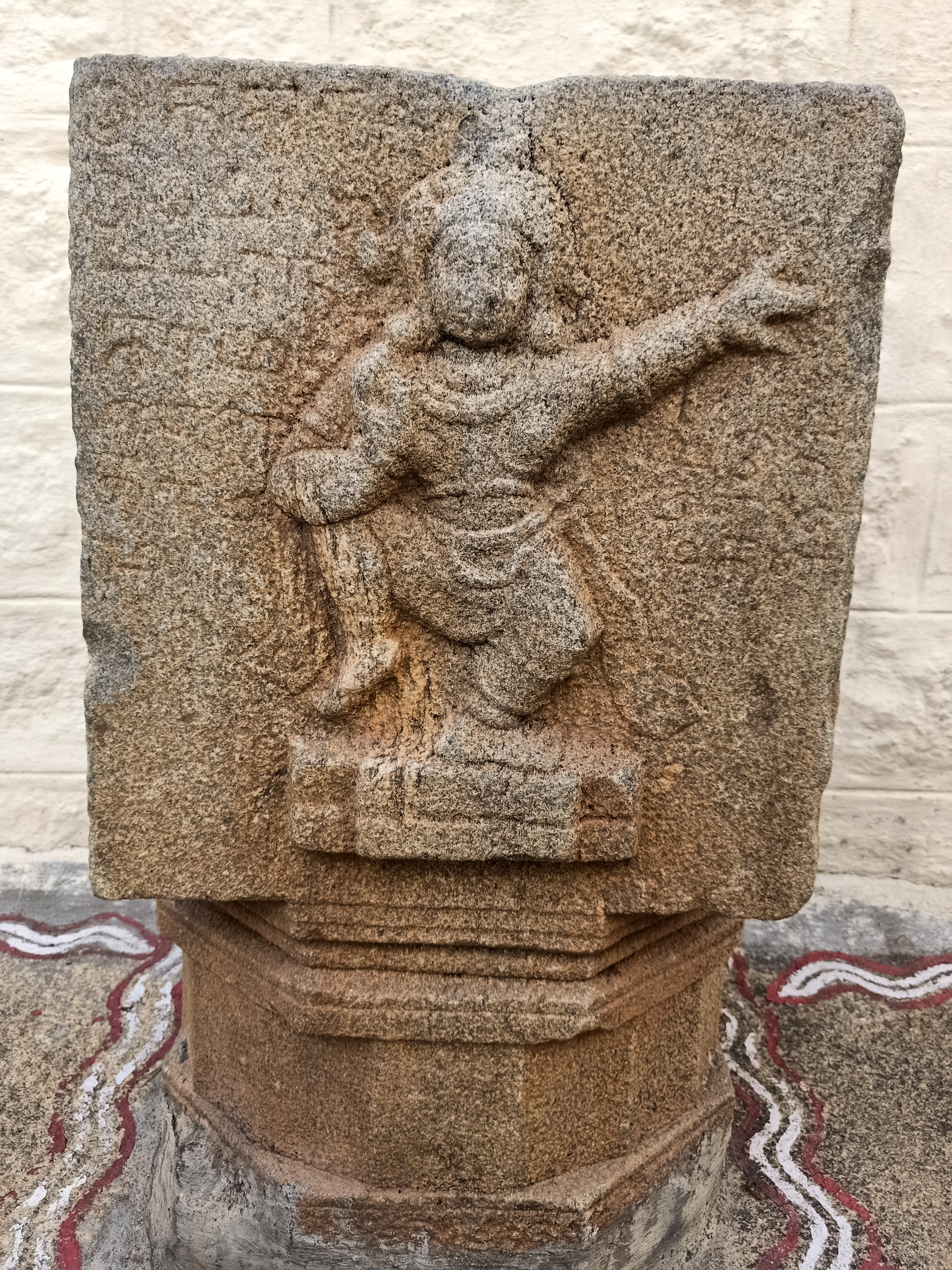
Kammanan's Krishna Pillar Fragmented Tamil Inscription

Kammanan's Krishna Pillar Fragmented Tamil Inscription

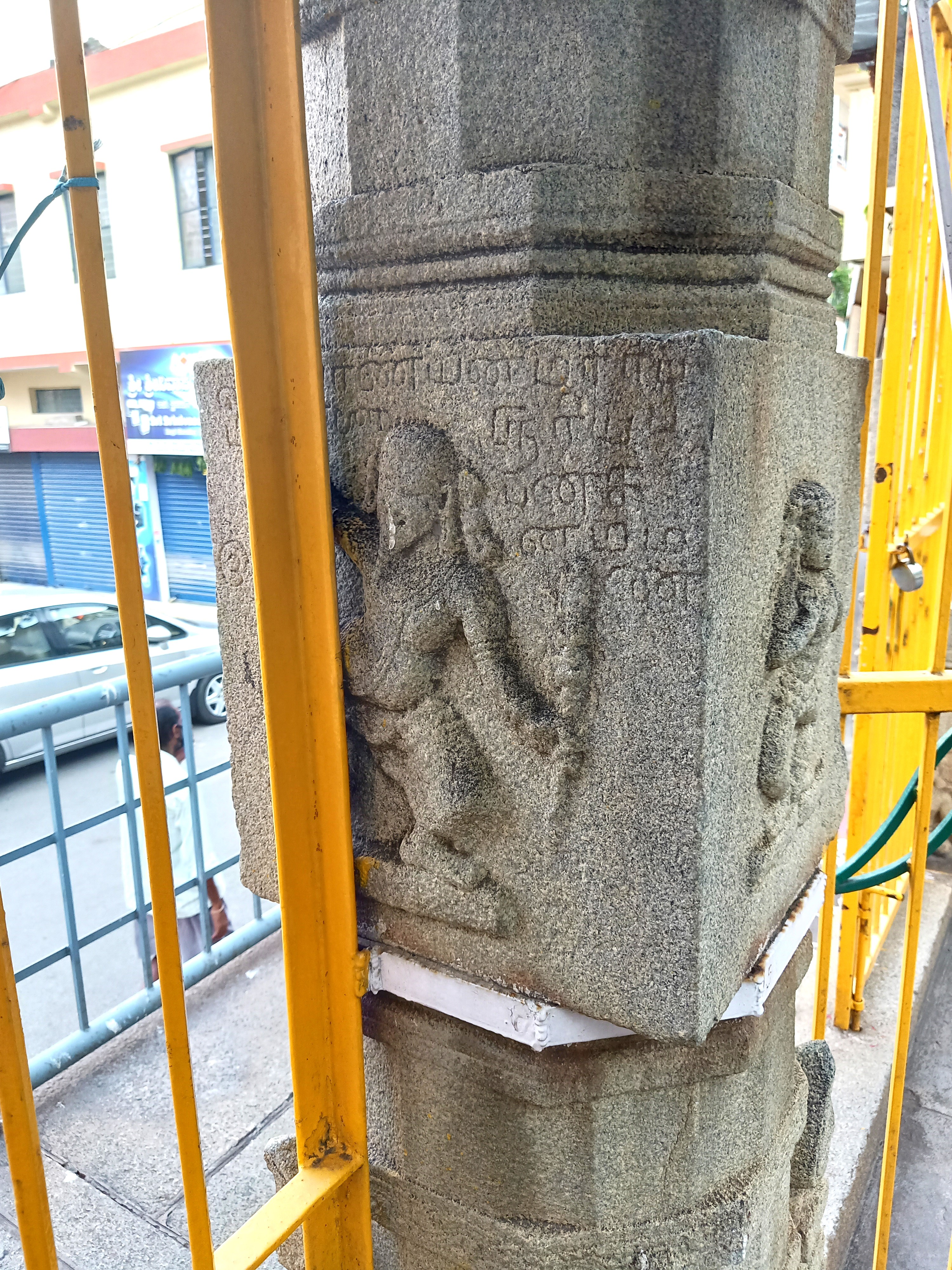
Marappillai Suryappan Fragmented Right Pillar Tamil Inscription

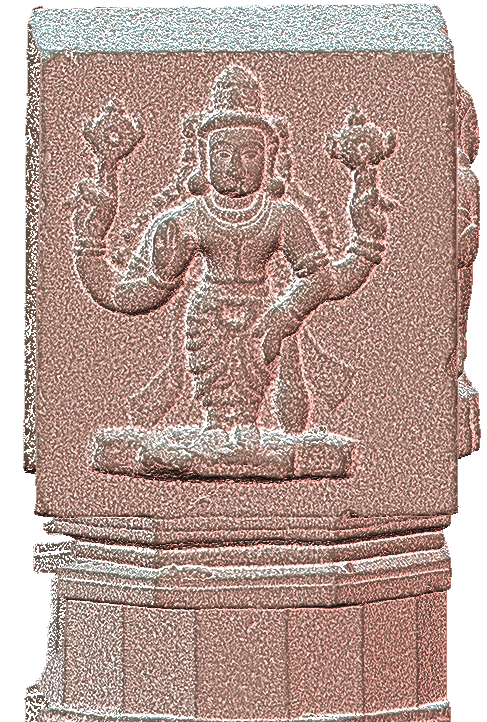
Kammanan's Krishna Pillar inscription Another side vishnu sculpture

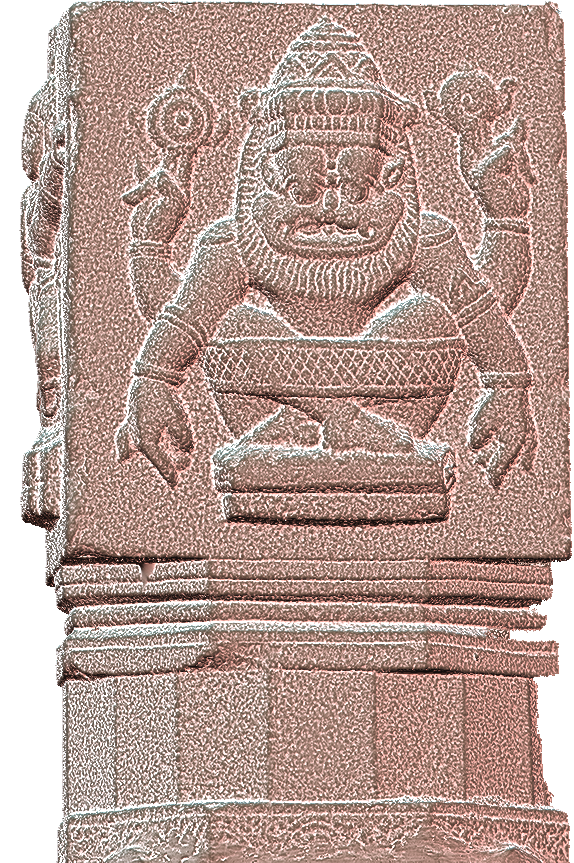
Kammanan's Krishna Pillar Another side Yoga Narasimha sculpture

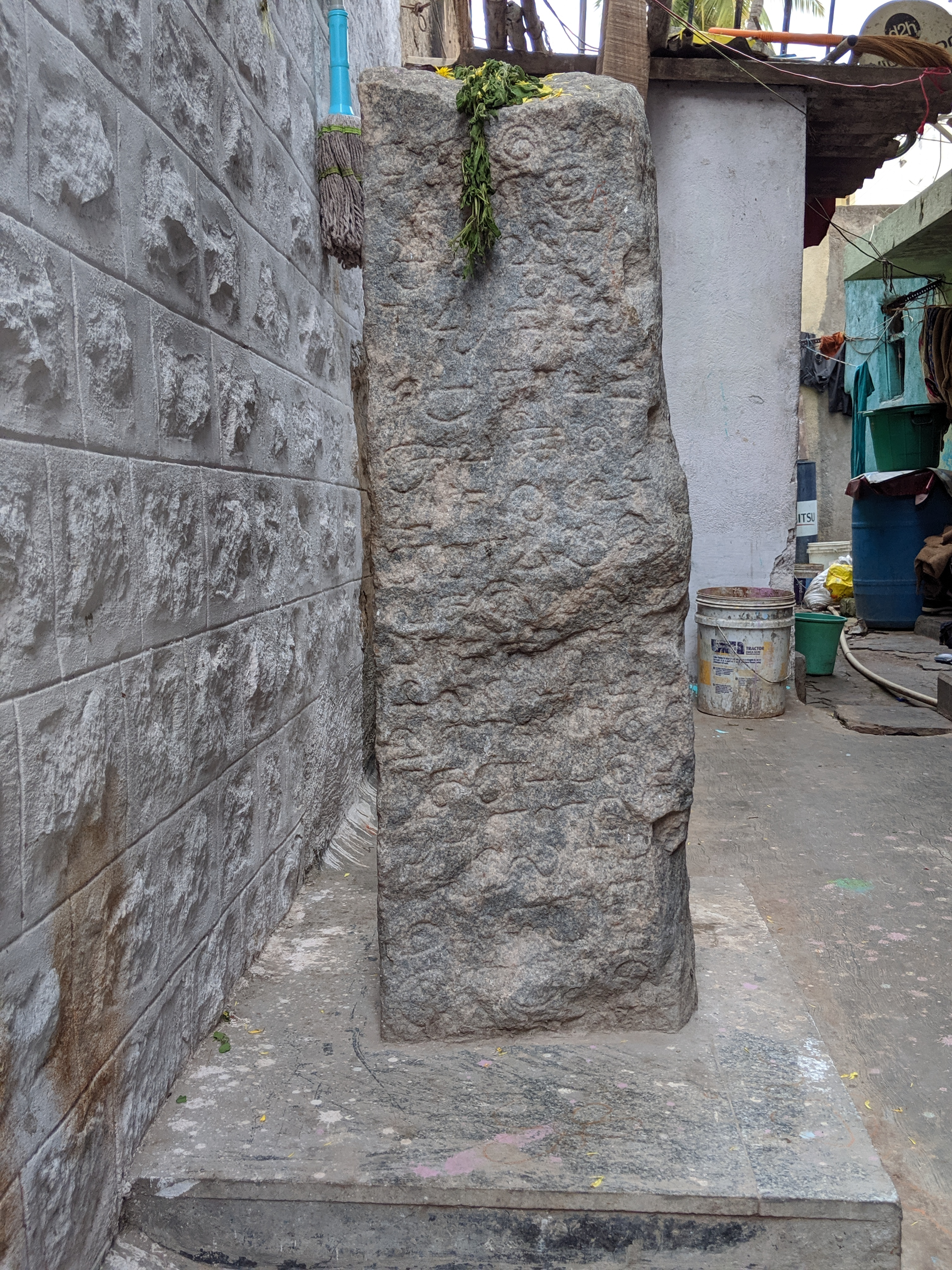
Domlur 13th-century Vira Ramanathan Pillar Tamil Inscription

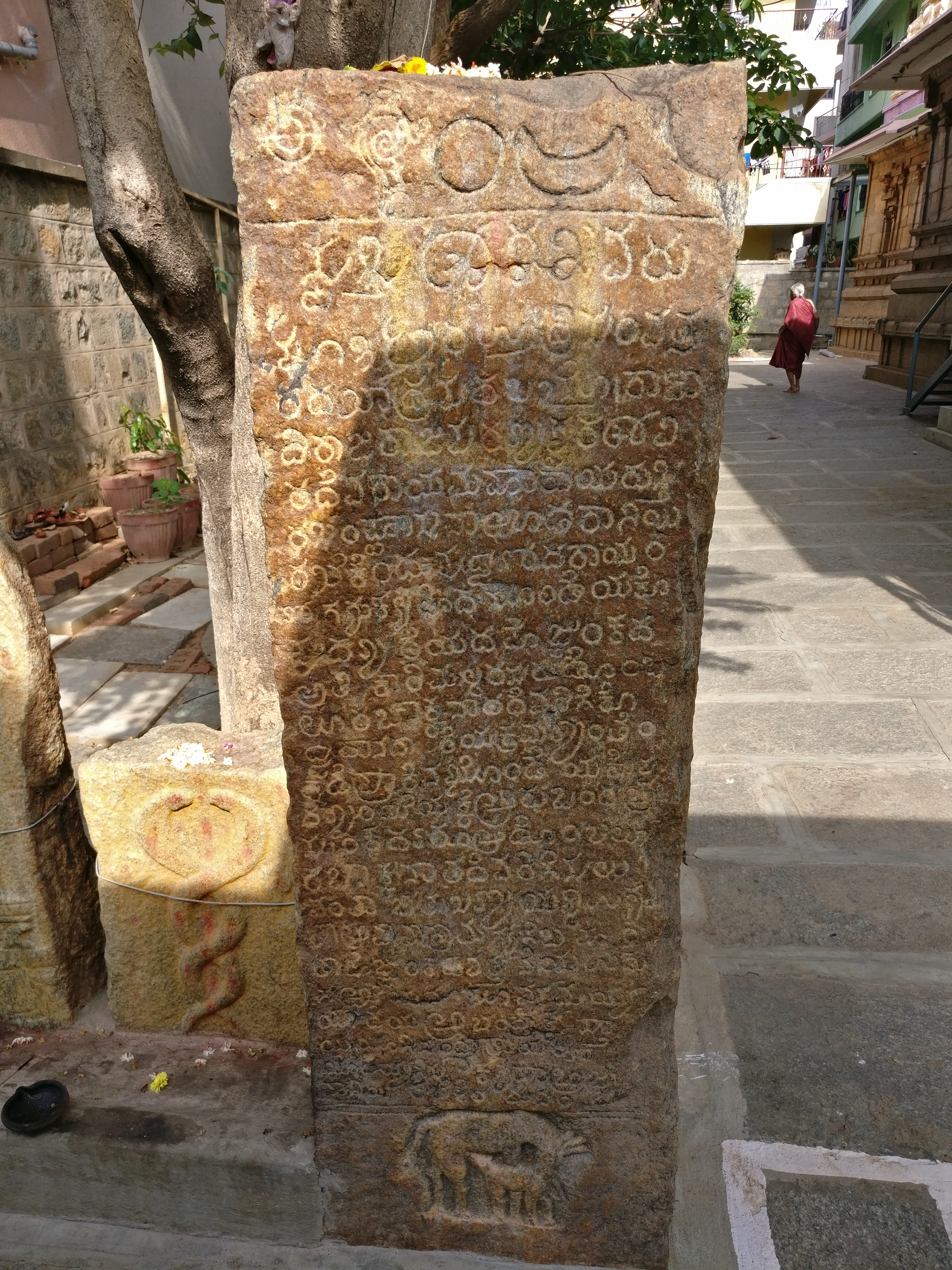
Domlur 1440CE Malarasa's Donation Inscription

== See also ==
- Tamil Inscriptions of Bengaluru
- Veera Ballala II
- Epigraphy
- Hoysala Empire
- Kannada inscriptions
- Katigenahalli inscription and hero stone
- Byadarahalli inscription and hero stone
