= Doddakallahalli, Tumkur =

Doddakalahalli is a village in Kunigal taluk of Tumkur district of the Indian state of Karnataka. The name of the village is derived from the rocky landscape - kallu meaning stone in Kannada. As of 2001 census, the population of the village was 722 (356 males, 366 females) with a literacy level of 52.10% (61.4% among men; 42.9 among women). The Mysore general census of 1871 listed 14 houses in the village with a total population of 102.
