= Doddakallahalli, Malur =

Village in Karnataka, India

Coordinates: 12°52′47.86″N 78°16′52.31″E

Doddakalahalli is a village in Malur taluk, Kolar district, Karnataka, India. It is part of the Rajenahalli Gram panchayat. The name of the village is derived from the rocky landscape; "Dodda" meaning bigger, kallu meaning stone, and "Halli" meaning village. The population of the village is 925.
