= Peenya Industry metro station =

Namma Metro's Green Line metro station

Peenya Industry
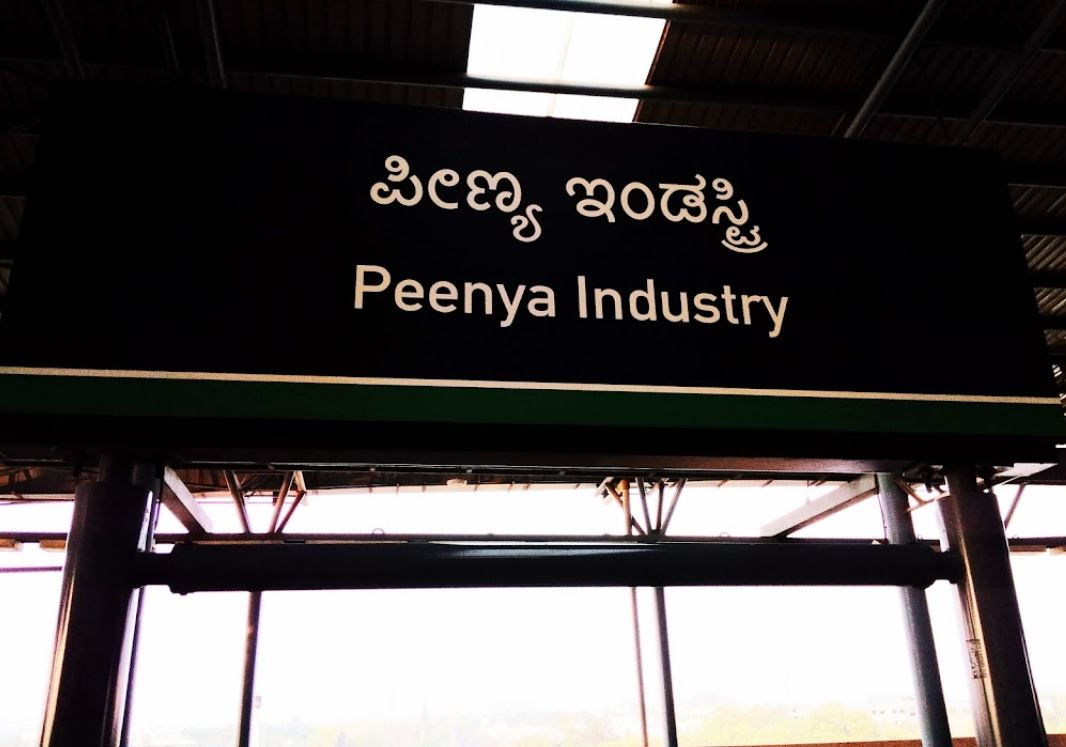

General information
- Location: Malur Byranahalli Road Peenya Bengaluru, Karnataka 560058
- Coordinates: 13°02′11″N 77°31′32″E
- System: Namma Metro station
- Owner: Bangalore Metro Rail Corporation Ltd (BMRCL)
- Operator: Namma Metro
- Line: Green Line
- Platforms: Side platform Platform-1 → Madavara; Platform-2 → Silk Institute Island platform Platform-2 → Silk Institute; Platform-3 → Yelachenahalli (Operational during peak hours)
- Tracks: 3

Construction
- Structure type: Elevated, Double track
- Platform levels: 2
- Accessible: Yes
- Architect: Larsen & Toubro

Other information
- Status: Staffed
- Station code: PYID

History
- Opened: March 1, 2014; 12 years ago
- Electrified: 750 V DC third rail

Services
| Preceding station | Namma Metro | Following station |
|---|---|---|
| Jalahalli towards Madavara | Green Line | Peenya towards Silk Institute |
Route map
Location

Peenya Industry is an elevated metro station on the North-South corridor of the Green Line of Namma Metro serving the Peenya area of Bengaluru, India. It was opened to the public on 1 March 2014.

== Station layout ==
| G | Street level | Exit/Entrance |
| L1 | Mezzanine | Fare control, station agent, Ticket/token, shops |
| L2 | Platform 3 Southbound | Towards → Yelachenahalli; Next Station: Peenya |
| L2 | Island platform | P2 doors will open on the left | P3 doors will open on the right |
| L2 | Platform 2 Southbound | Towards → Silk Institute; Next Station: Peenya Change at the next station for Orange Line ** |
| L2 | Platform 1 Northbound | Towards ← Madavara; Next Station: Jalahalli |
| L2 | Side platform | Doors will open on the left |
| L2 | Note: | (Towards Yelachenahalli - Operational during peak hours) |

== See also ==
- Bengaluru
- List of Namma Metro stations
- Transport in Karnataka
- List of metro systems
- List of rapid transit systems in India
