= Yelachenahalli metro station =

Namma Metro's Green Line metro station

Yelachenahalli
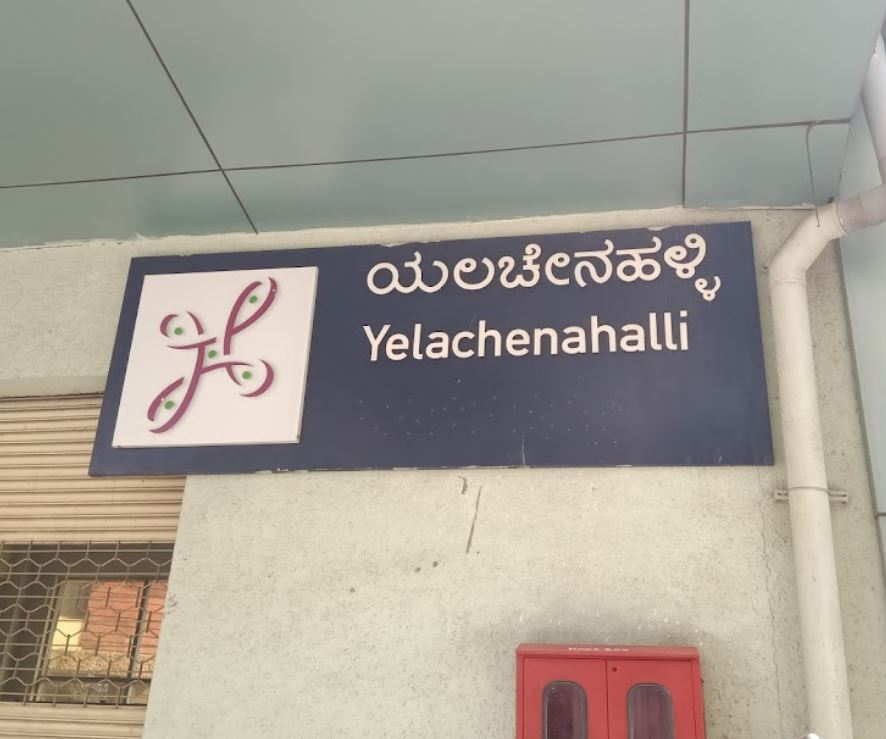

General information
- Other names: Puttenahalli
- Location: Kanakapura Road, Harsha Layout, Kumaraswamy Layout, Bengaluru, Karnataka 560078
- Coordinates: 12.895983°N 77.570159°E
- System: Namma Metro station
- Owner: Bangalore Metro Rail Corporation Ltd (BMRCL)
- Operator: Namma Metro
- Line: Green Line
- Platforms: Side platform Platform-1 → Peenya Industry / Madavara; Platform-2 → Silk Institute (Operational to Peenya Industry during peak hours)
- Tracks: 2

Construction
- Structure type: Elevated, Double track
- Platform levels: 2
- Parking: Paid parking
- Accessible: Yes
- Architect: JMC Projects

Other information
- Status: Staffed
- Station code: PUTH

History
- Opened: 18 June 2017; 9 years ago
- Electrified: 750 V DC third rail

Services
Preceding station	Namma Metro	Following station
Jaya Prakash Nagar towards Madavara	Green Line	Konanakunte Cross towards Silk Institute
Route map
Location

Yelachenahalli (formerly known as Puttenahalli) is an elevated metro station on the north–south corridor of the Green Line of Namma Metro located on Kanakapura Road between Yelechenahalli and Konanakunte suburbs in Bengaluru, India. It was opened to the public on 18 June 2017.

Next to the Yelachenahalli Metro station, stands the electrical switch yard for the metro line. This area was earlier occupied by Shravanthi Kalyana Mantapa. The land was acquired by Namma Metro to build the Yelachenahalli Metro Station. The station also serves the residents of Reserve Bank Layout, Kumaraswamy Layout and adjoining areas.

== History ==
This station was constructed by JMC Projects, part of Reach 4A of Phase 1. The station being closer to Yelachenahalli than Puttenahalli, was renamed to Yelachenahalli metro station in July 2016. This change came after public pressure, which resulted in an expert committee reviewing the issue and concluding the name-change would be appropriate.

The station was the southern terminus of the Green Line until January 2021, when the section Reach 4B of Phase 2 completed construction. This extended the line to the Silk Institute metro station.

== Station layout ==
G	Street level	Exit/Entrance
L1	Mezzanine	Fare control, station agent, Metro Card vending machines, crossover
L2	Side platform | Doors will open on the left
L2	Platform 2 Southbound	Towards → Silk Institute; Next Station: Konanakunte Cross
L2	Platform 1 Northbound	Towards ← Peenya Industry / Nagasandra / Madavara; Next Station: Jaya Prakash Nagar; Change at the next station for Orange Line **
L2	Side platform | Doors will open on the left
L2	Note:	(Towards Peenya Industry/Nagasandra - Operational during peak hours)

== Entry/Exits ==
There are 3 Entry/Exit points – A, B and C. Commuters can use either of the points for their travel.

- Entry/Exit point A: Towards Kanakapura Road side
- Entry/Exit point B: Towards Kanakapura Road side (Konanakunte Cross)
- Entry/Exit point C: Towards Jyothi Kendriya Vidyalaya side

== See also ==
- Bengaluru
- List of Namma Metro stations
- Transport in Karnataka
- List of metro systems
- List of rapid transit systems in India
