= Konanakunte Cross metro station =

Namma Metro's Green Line metro station

Konanakunte Cross
- Konanakunte Cross metro station

General information
- Other names: Munireddy Layout
- Location: Munireddy Layout, Konanakunte, Bengaluru, Karnataka 560062, India; India
- Coordinates: 12°53′05″N 77°33′10″E
- System: Namma Metro station
- Owner: Bangalore Metro Rail Corporation Ltd (BMRCL)
- Operator: Namma Metro
- Line: Green Line
- Platforms: Side platform Platform-1 → Madavara; Platform-2 → Silk Institute
- Tracks: 2

Construction
- Structure type: Elevated, Double track
- Platform levels: 2
- Accessible: Yes
- Architect: Nagarjuna Construction Company (NCC)

Other information
- Status: Staffed
- Station code: APRC

History
- Opened: 21 January 2021; 5 years ago
- Electrified: 750 V DC third rail

Services
Preceding station	Namma Metro	Following station
Yelachenahalli towards Madavara	Green Line	Doddakallasandra towards Silk Institute
Route map
Location

Konanakunte Cross is an elevated metro station on the North-South corridor of the Green Line of Namma Metro serving the Konanakunte area of Bengaluru, India. It was opened to the public on 21 January 2021.

== Station layout ==
G	Street level	Exit/Entrance
L1	Mezzanine	Fare control, station agent, Metro Card vending machines, crossover
L2	Side platform | Doors will open on the left
L2	Platform 2 Southbound	Towards → Silk Institute; Next Station: Doddakallasandra
L2	Platform 1 Northbound	Towards ← Madavara; Next Station: Yelachenahalli
L2	Side platform | Doors will open on the left
L2

== Entry/Exits ==
There are 2 Entry/Exit points – A and B. Commuters can use either of the points for their travel.

- Entry/Exit point A: Towards Konanakunte side
- Entry/Exit point B: Towards Vasantapura road side

== See also ==
- Bengaluru
- List of Namma Metro stations
- Transport in Karnataka
- List of metro systems
- List of rapid transit systems in India
