= Peenya metro station =

Namma Metro's Green Line metro station and upcoming interchange for Orange Line

Peenya
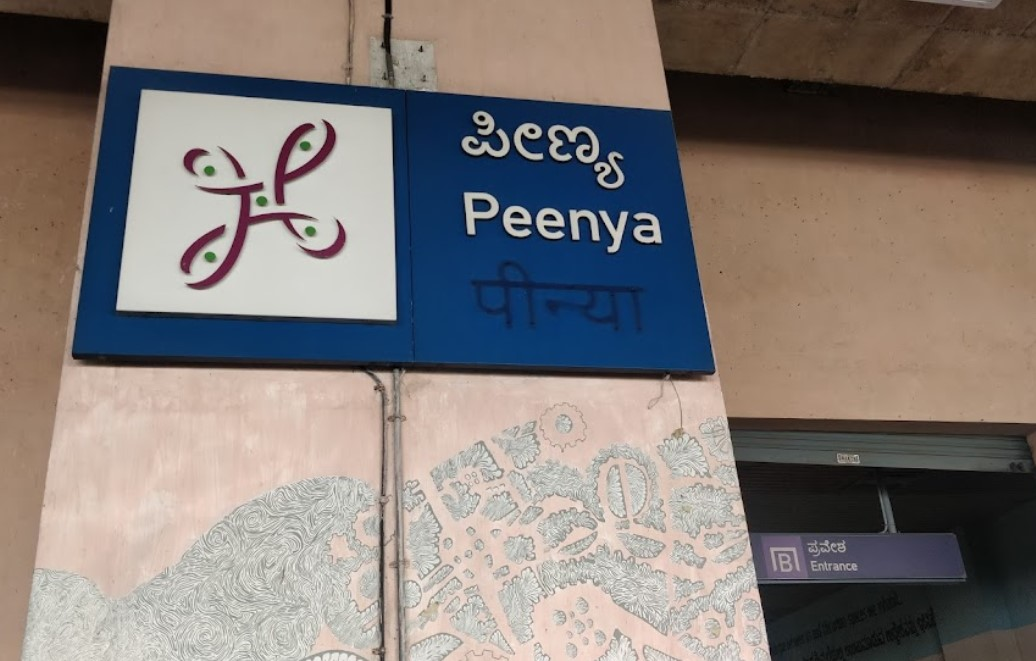

General information
- Location: Peenya, Bengaluru, Karnataka 560022
- Coordinates: 13°01′59″N 77°32′00″E
- System: Namma Metro station
- Owner: Bangalore Metro Rail Corporation Ltd (BMRCL)
- Operator: Namma Metro
- Line: Green Line Orange Line (Approved)
- Platforms: Side platform Platform-1 → Madavara; Platform-2 → Silk Institute
- Tracks: 2 (current)

Construction
- Structure type: Elevated, Double track
- Platform levels: 2 (current)
- Accessible: Yes
- Architect: Larsen & Toubro

Other information
- Status: Staffed
- Station code: PEYA

History
- Opened: March 1, 2014; 12 years ago
- Electrified: 750 V DC third rail

Services
Preceding station	Namma Metro	Following station
Peenya Industry towards Madavara	Green Line	Goraguntepalya towards Silk Institute
Kanteerava Nagar towards JP Nagar 4th Phase	Orange Line (Approved)	Muthyalanagar towards Kempapura
Route map
Location

Peenya is an elevated metro station on the North-South corridor of the Green Line and the interchange for the upcoming Orange Line of Namma Metro serving the Peenya area of Bengaluru, India. It was opened to the public on 1 March 2014.

== Station layout ==
Green Line Station Layout

G	Street level	Exit/Entrance
L1	Mezzanine	Fare control, station agent, Metro Card vending machines, crossover
L2	Side platform | Doors will open on the left
L2	Platform 2 Southbound	Towards → Silk Institute; Next Station: Goraguntepalya
L2	Platform 1 Norhtbound	Towards ← Madavara; Next Station: Peenya Industry
L2	Side platform | Doors will open on the left
L2

Orange Line Station Layout (TBC)

G	Street level	Exit/Entrance
L1	Mezzanine	Fare control, station agent, Metro Card vending machines, crossover
L2	Side platform | Doors will open on the left
L2	Platform 2 Southbound	Towards → JP Nagar 4th Phase; Next Station: Kanteerava Nagar
L2	Platform 1 Norhtbound	Towards ← Kempapura; Next Station: Muthyalanagar
L2	Side platform | Doors will open on the left
L2

== See also ==
- Bengaluru
- List of Namma Metro stations
- Transport in Karnataka
- List of metro systems
- List of rapid transit systems in India
