= Green Line (Namma Metro) =

Line of Bengaluru's Namma Metro

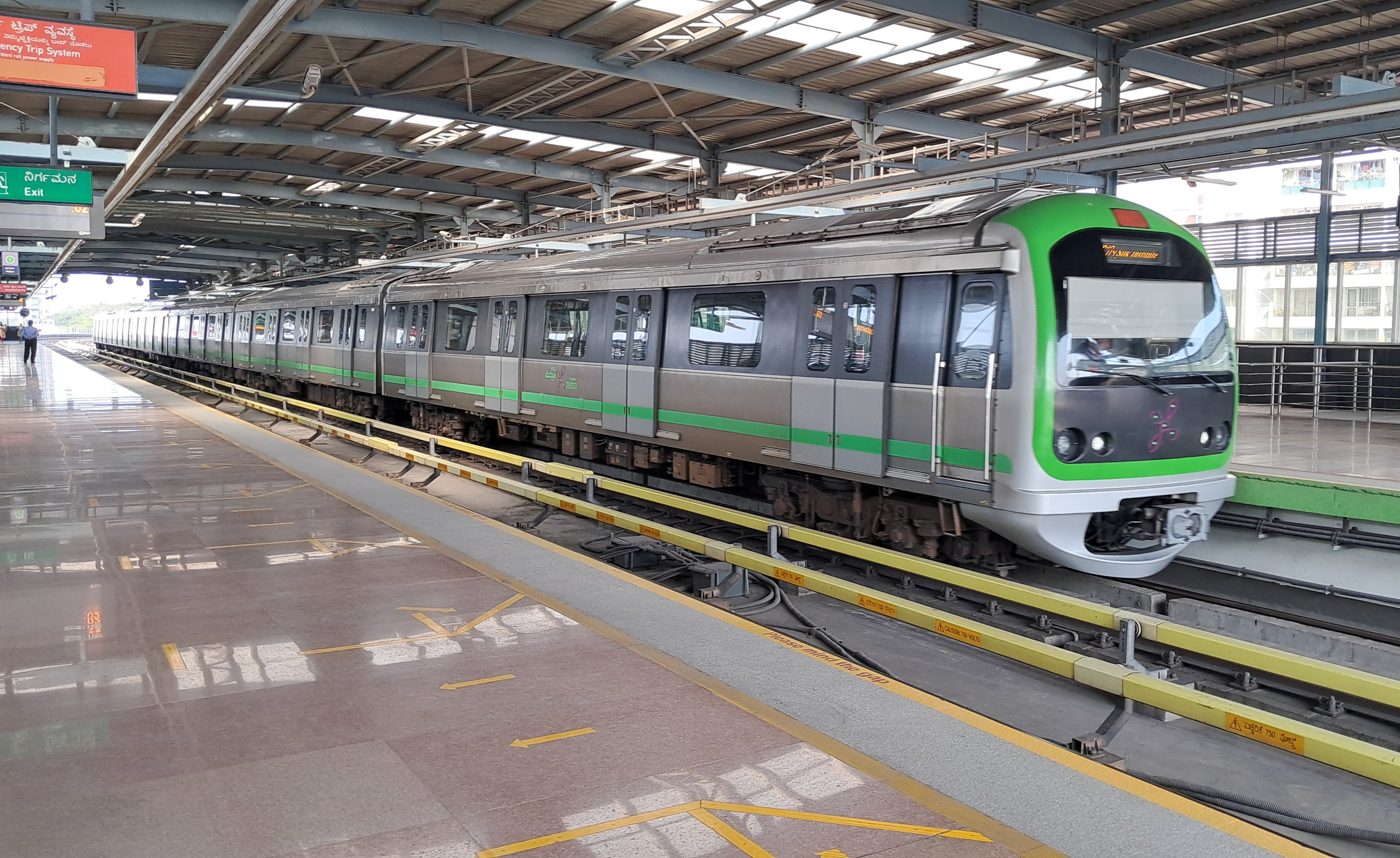
- This trainset on standby at Banashankari metro station and heading towards Silk Institute metro station

Overview
- Other names: North–South Corridor; Line 2; Madavara–Silk Institute Line
- Native name: Hasiru mārga
- Status: Operational
- Owner: Bengaluru Metro Rail Corporation Limited (BMRCL)
- Locale: Bengaluru, Karnataka, India
- Termini: Madavara; Silk Institute
- Connecting lines: Operational (2): Purple Line Yellow Line; Upcoming (1): Orange Line Planned (1): Inner Ring Line
- Stations: 32 (Operational)
- Website: bmrc.co.in

Service
- Type: Rapid transit
- System: Namma Metro
- Depot(s): Peenya; Anjanapura (Under Construction)
- Rolling stock: BEML
- Daily ridership: 170,685
- Ridership: 62.3 million (2018)

History
- Opened: 1 March 2014; 12 years ago
- Last extension: 07 November 2024; 23 months ago

Technical
- Line length: 33.46 km (20.79 mi)
- Number of tracks: 2
- Character: Elevated and underground
- Track gauge: 1,435 mm (4 ft 8 1/2 in) standard gauge
- Electrification: 750 V DC third rail
- Operating speed: 40 km/h (25 mph)

The Green Line is a line on the Namma Metro rail system. As of 2026, the line is 33.46 km (20.79 mi) long and connects Madavara in the northwest to Silk Institute in the south. The line connects the north western suburbs and neighbourhoods of Bengaluru, such as Madavara, Jalahalli, Peenya, Yeshwanthpur, Rajajinagar and Malleshwaram along Tumkur Road with the central hub of Majestic and the southern residential areas of Bangalore such as Basavanagudi, Jayanagara, Banashankari, Konanakunte and Thalaghattapura along Kanakapura Road. The Green Line is mostly elevated, with 29 elevated and 3 underground stations. There are two interchanges along the Green Line, One with the Purple Line at Nadaprabhu Kempegowda Station, Majestic and the other with the Yellow Line at Rashtreeya Vidyalaya Road.

== History ==
Green Line sections were opened as indicated below.

History
Phase	Section	Opening date	Terminals		Length	Stations
1	Reach 3	1 March 2014	Mantri Square Sampige Road	Yeshwanthpur	5.10 km (3.17 mi)	7
1	Reach 3A	1 March 2014	Yeshwanthpur	Peenya Industry	4.80 km (2.98 mi)	3
1	Reach 3B	1 May 2015	Peenya Industry	Nagasandra	2.50 km (1.55 mi)	3
1	UG 2	18 June 2017	Mantri Square Sampige Road	National College	4.0 km (2.49 mi)	3
1	Reach 4	18 June 2017	National College	Rashtreeya Vidyalaya Road	4.10 km (2.55 mi)	5
1	Reach 4A	18 June 2017	Rashtreeya Vidyalaya Road	Yelachenahalli	3.90 km (2.42 mi)	3
2	Reach 4B	15 January 2021	Yelachenahalli	Silk Institute	6.29 km (3.91 mi)	5
2	Reach 3C	7 November 2024	Nagasandra	Madavara	3.14 km (1.95 mi)	3
Total			Madavara	Silk Institute	33.46 km (20.79 mi)	32

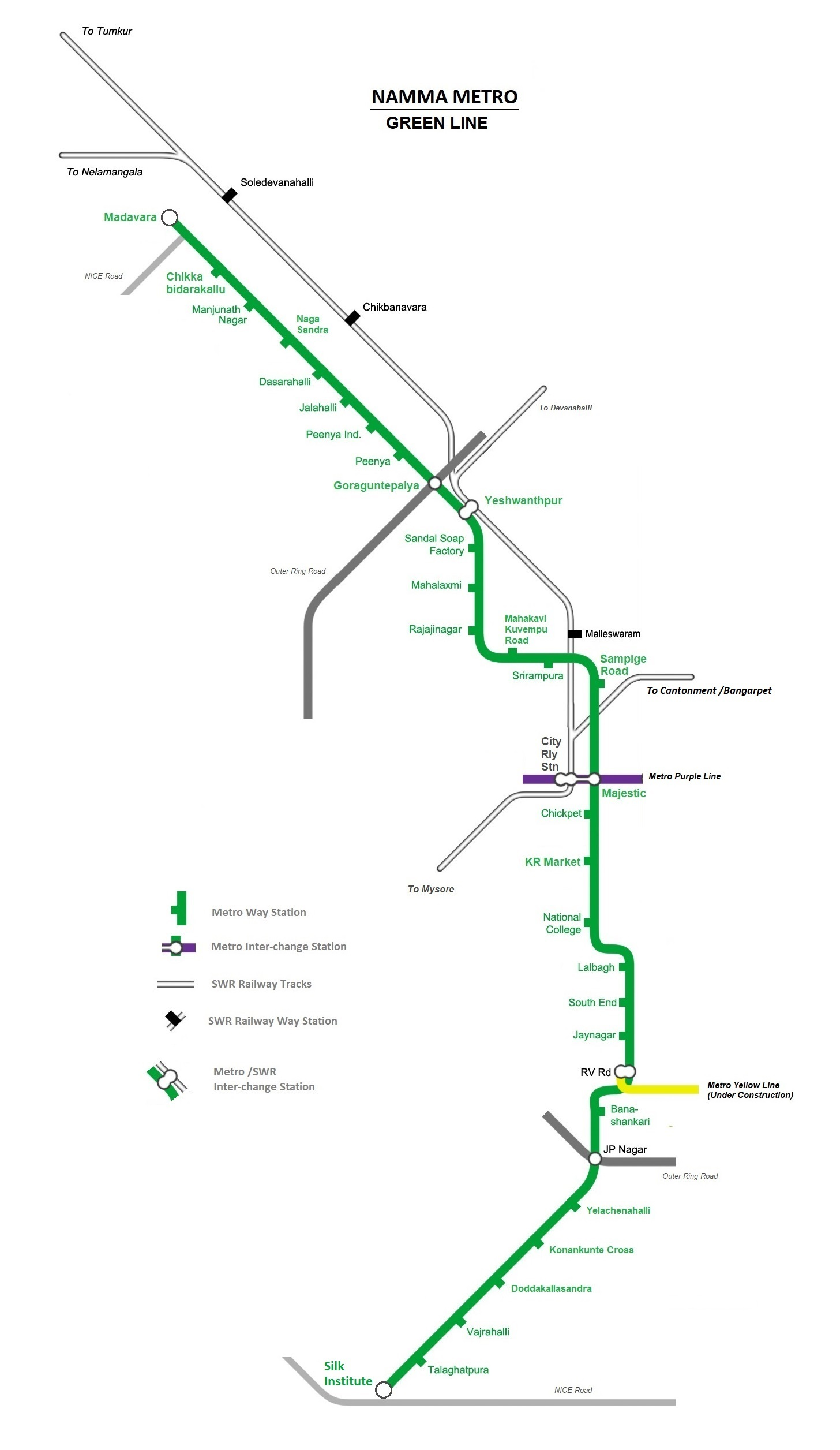

=== Phase I ===
Construction work on Reach 3 and 3A of Phase I of the Namma Metro began in 2009–10. The total cost of the project on this stretch was ₹2,100 crore (equivalent to ₹37 billion or US$380 million in 2026) . Work on the underground section commenced in May 2011. Tunnel boring machines named Kaveri, Krishna and Godavari were used for tunnel boring work for the Green Line. The first trial run on the Green Line was conducted on 8 August 2013.

Construction required 1.3 lakh tonnes of concrete, 44,500 tonnes (98,100,000 lb) of steel bars, and 190 km (118.1 mi) of high tension wires weighing 2,900 tonnes (6,400,000 lb). A total of 395 piers, including station piers and portals, were constructed on the stretch. The tallest pier of the viaduct is a 21-metre (69 ft) pier between Mahakavi Kuvempu Road and Srirampura stations, opposite Gayatri Devi Park. There 353 spans on the stretch, the longest being the 66-metre (217 ft) curved span over the railway track off Srirampura. The total roofing area of the 10 stations on the stretch was 47,000 square metres (510,000 sq ft).

The first section of Green Line was opened to public on 1 March 2014. BMRCL Managing Director Pradeep Singh Kharola stated that about 25,000 passengers traveled on the line on the opening day. In the first month of operations, 7.62 lakh people at an average of 24,605 people daily used the Green Line, generating a revenue of ₹1.5 crore (US$160,000).

TBM Godavari began drilling the 970-metre (3,180 ft) underground section between Sampige Road and Majestic stations in April 2014. Godavari broke down a few months later, and needed to have its cutter head replaced, due to contact with tough terrain including hard rock and boulders. The machine restarted work in September 2015 after importing the cutter head from Italy. Godavari completed drilling and emerged on the Majestic station end of the tunnel on 19 April 2016. Meanwhile, Kaveri and Krishna drilled the underground section between National College and Nadaprabhu Kempegowda station.

Construction of the underground section of Green Line required the use of 3,000 transit mixer loads of concrete. 1,000 km (620 mi) of cable had to be laid.

Trial runs on the elevated section between National College and Yelachenahalli began on 23 November 2016. Trials were conducted between National College and Jayanagara initially at a speed of 10 km/h (6.2 mph), and then along the entire elevated section between National College and Yelachenahalli at a speed of 25 km/h (15.5 mph). Trial runs began in the tunneled section on 30 March 2017.

Services at Sampige Road, Srirampura and Kuvempu Road stations were suspended between 13 and 22 March 2017 to allow authorities to conduct static and other tests and to link Sampige Road station with Nadaprabhu Kempegowda station. During the 10-day testing period, services operated only between Nagasandra and Rajajinagar stations. The BMTC introduced rail replacement bus services from Rajajinagara to Hosahalli. Services between Sampige Road and Rajajinagara were suspended again for four days beginning 13 April 2017 to conduct trial runs on the underground section between Sampige Road and National College. Trial runs were completed on 16 May 2017.

=== Phase II ===
Contract for construction of the 6.5 km Reach 4B from Yelachenahalli to Silk Institute was awarded to Nagarjuna Construction Co. The extension was estimated to cost ₹508.86 crore (US$53 million). Civil work on the extension began in October 2016 and was completed by 2020. Trial runs were conducted on 18–19 December 2020, and the extension was opened on 14 January 2021, making it the first section of Phase II to start commercial operations.

In October 2016, BMRCL invited bids for the construction of viaduct and stations on the 3.031 km extension (Reach 3C) of the Green Line from Nagasandra to Madavara (previously named Bengaluru International Exhibition Centre). Reach 3C was awarded to Simplex Infrastructure Limited in late February 2017. The contract specified a cost of ₹247.41 crore (US$26 million) and a deadline for completion of 27 months. The start of construction on the extension was delayed by 4 months due to land acquisition issues concerning land near Jindal Aluminium Limited in Kirloskar Layout. The issues were resolved and construction began in June 2017. Trial runs were conducted in August 2024 and it was opened on 7 November 2024. The final cost of the extension was ₹1,168 crore (equivalent to ₹12 billion or US$130 million in 2026).

After Phase II was completed, the line extended its stretch from Madavara in northwest to Silk Institute in the South. The length of the line increased to 34.46 kilometres (21.41 mi). Commercial operations on the Nagasandra-Madavara stretch started from November 7, 2024.

There have been petitions to extend the line further south till the Art of Living International Centre in the outskirts of Bengaluru.

== Stations ==
There are 32 stations on the Green Line. Each station has around 60 surveillance cameras. Passenger lifts and escalators are provided at all stations. The Line has an operational depot at Peenya and another under construction at Silk Institute

=== Interchanges ===
Passenger interchange facilities, connecting to other metro and railway lines, will be provided at the following stations:

- Peenya (connects to the Orange Line, which runs between Kempapura and JP Nagar 4th Phase)
- Yeshwanthpur (connects to the Yesvantpur Junction railway station)
- Nadaprabhu Kempegowda station, Majestic (connects to the Purple Line, which runs between Whitefield (Kadugodi) and Challaghatta, also connects to the Bengaluru City railway station and Kempegowda Bus Station)
- Rashtreeya Vidyalaya Road (connects to the Yellow Line, which runs between Rashtreeya Vidyalaya Road and Delta Electronics Bommasandra)
- Jaya Prakash Nagar (connects to the Orange Line, which runs between Kempapura and JP Nagar 4th Phase)

=== List of stations ===
Green Line
#	Station name		Opening	Connections	Station type	Platform type
#	English	Kannada	Opening	Connections	Station type	Platform type
1	Madavara	ಮಾದಾವರ	7 November 2024		Elevated	Side
2	Chikkabidarakallu	ಚಿಕ್ಕಬಿದರಕಲ್ಲು	7 November 2024		Elevated	Side
3	Manjunath Nagar	ಮಂಜುನಾಥನಗರ	7 November 2024		Elevated	Side
4	Nagasandra	ನಾಗಸಂದ್ರ	1 May 2015		Elevated	Side
5	Dasarahalli	ದಾಸರಹಳ್ಳಿ	1 May 2015		Elevated	Side
6	Jalahalli	ಜಾಲಹಳ್ಳಿ	1 May 2015	Basaveshwara Bus Station	Elevated	Side
7	Peenya Industry	ಪೀಣ್ಯ ಇಂಡಸ್ಟ್ರಿ	1 March 2014		Elevated	Side
8	Peenya	ಪೀಣ್ಯ	1 March 2014	Orange Line (Approved)	Elevated	Side
9	Goraguntepalya	ಗೊರಗುಂಟೆಪಾಳ್ಯ	1 March 2014		Elevated	Side
10	Yeshwanthpur	ಯಶವಂತಪುರ	1 March 2014	Yesvantpur Junction	Elevated	Side
11	Sandal Soap Factory	ಸ್ಯಾಂಡಲ್ ಸೋಪ್ ಫ್ಯಾಕ್ಟರಿ	1 March 2014	Yeshwanthpura TTMC	Elevated	Side
12	Mahalakshmi	ಮಹಾಲಕ್ಷ್ಮೀ	1 March 2014		Elevated	Side
13	Rajajinagara	ರಾಜಾಜಿನಗರ	1 March 2014		Elevated	Side
14	Mahakavi Kuvempu Road	ಮಹಾಕವಿ ಕುವೆಂಪು ರಸ್ತೆ	1 March 2014		Elevated	Side
15	Srirampura	ಶ್ರೀರಾಮ್ ಪುರ	1 March 2014		Elevated	Side
16	Mantri Square Sampige Road	ಮಂತ್ರಿ ಸ್ಕ್ವೇರ್ ಸಂಪಿಗೆ ರಸ್ತೆ	1 March 2014		Elevated	Side
17	Nadaprabhu Kempegowda station, Majestic	ನಾಡಪ್ರಭು ಕೆಂಪೇಗೌಡ ನಿಲ್ದಾಣ, ಮೆಜೆಸ್ಟಿಕ್	18 June 2017	Purple Line; KSR Bengaluru; Kempegowda Bus Station	Underground	Island & Side
18	Chickpete	ಚಿಕ್ಕಪೇಟೆ	18 June 2017		Underground	Island
19	Krishna Rajendra Market	ಕೃಷ್ಣ ರಾಜೇಂದ್ರ ಮಾರುಕಟ್ಟೆ	18 June 2017		Underground	Island
20	National College	ನ್ಯಾಷನಲ್ ಕಾಲೇಜ್	18 June 2017		Elevated	Side
21	Lalbagh	ಲಾಲ್ಬಾಗ್	18 June 2017		Elevated	Side
22	South End Circle	ಸೌತ್ ಎಂಡ್ ಸರ್ಕಲ್	18 June 2017		Elevated	Side
23	Jayanagara	ಜಯನಗರ	18 June 2017	Jayanagara TTMC	Elevated	Side
24	Rashtreeya Vidyalaya Road	ರಾಷ್ಟ್ರೀಯ ವಿದ್ಯಾಲಯ ರಸ್ತೆ	18 June 2017	Yellow Line	Elevated	Island & Side
25	Banashankari	ಬನಶಂಕರಿ	18 June 2017	Banashankari TTMC	Elevated	Side
26	Jaya Prakash Nagar	ಜಯಪ್ರಕಾಶ ನಗರ	18 June 2017	Orange Line (Approved)	Elevated	Side
27	Yelachenahalli	ಯಲಚೇನಹಳ್ಳಿ	18 June 2017		Elevated	Side
28	Konanakunte Cross	ಕೋಣನಕುಂಟೆ ಕ್ರಾಸ್	15 January 2021		Elevated	Side
29	Doddakallasandra	ದೊಡ್ಡಕಲ್ಲಸಂದ್ರ	15 January 2021		Elevated	Side
30	Vajarahalli	ವಾಜರಹಳ್ಳಿ	15 January 2021		Elevated	Side
31	Thalaghattapura	ತಲಘಟ್ಟಪುರ	15 January 2021		Elevated	Side
32	Silk Institute	ರೇಷ್ಮೆ ಸಂಸ್ಥೆ	15 January 2021		Elevated	Side

== Infrastructure ==
=== Rolling stock ===
BMRC procured 150 metro coaches for fifty 3-car train sets for Phase l of Namma Metro from BEML-Hyundai Rotem at a cost of Rs 1,672.50 crore (Rs 16.72 billion). Coaches were 20.8 metres (68 ft) long, 2.88 metres (9.4 ft) wide and 3.8 metres (12 ft) high. Each coach has a seating capacity of about 50 and standing capacity of approximately 306, making each train have a capacity of about 1000. Traction was through four 180 kW motors in each motor coach. The trains have a maximum speed of 80 km/h, axle load of 15 tonnes, and operate on 750 volt direct current with third rail power collection. The coaches are made of stainless steel and are fully air-conditioned, and contain longitudinal banks of seats, wide vestibules between coaches, non-skid and non-slip floor surfaces, four wide passenger access doors on each side, an automatic voice announcement system and electronic information and destination displays.

Initial operations on the Green Line began with twenty-one 3-coach trains. As loads increased with increasing ridership, all trains were converted to six coaches. Rolling stock on the Green Line are silver with a streak of bright green along its length.

In December 2025, BMRCL announced that the line will get 21 new trainset from Titagarh-CRRC venture which will be made in Made in India and the existing trainsets will be shifted to the purple line. Testing is ongoing for the new trainset and will start being delivered by Titagarh after regulatory approval and the Yellow Line trainset order is complete. The trains will be similar in design to the Yellow Line trains.

=== Power ===
Power is supplied to the Green Line from the Peenya sub-station of the Karnataka Power Transmission Corporation Ltd. (KPTCL).

=== Signaling ===
In September 2009, a consortium led by Alstom Project India Limited was awarded a contract worth ₹563.4 crore (US$66.6 million) to supply control and signalling system for the first phase of the project. The consortium is led by Alstom and composed of Alstom Transport SA, Thales Group Portugal S A and Sumitomo Corporation. Alstom will provide the design, manufacture, supply, installing, testing and commissioning of the train control and signalling system and Thales will provide the design, installing, testing and commissioning of the telecommunication system for Phase I of the metro system. It includes the Urbalis 200 Automatic Train Control system which will ensure optimal safety, flexible operations and heightened passenger comfort.

The integrated control centre at Baiyyappanahalli has direct communication with trains and stations, which are fitted with CCTV with visual and audio service information.

== Operations ==
=== Frequency and capacity ===
Trains initially operated on the Green Line from 6 am to 11 pm. This was extended from 5 am to 11 pm from 1 December 2015. The frequency along the line was 15 minutes from 5 am to 8 am and 8 pm to 11 pm, and 10 minutes between 8 am and 8 pm. Trains halt for 30 seconds at each station. Each six-coach train has a capacity of 2,004 passengers.

Fire Department.

Namma Metro has a dedicated fire team to take care of operations and maintenance of the firefighting system installed in metro stations. They conduct regular mock exercises and liaison with the state fire department for any assistance in case of a fire emergency.

== See also ==
- Namma Metro
  - Purple Line
  - Yellow Line
  - Pink Line
  - Blue Line
  - Orange Line
  - Grey Line
  - Red Line
  - Inner Ring Line
- List of Namma Metro stations
- Rapid transit in India
- List of metro systems
