= Lalbagh metro station =

Namma Metro's Green Line metro station

Lalbagh
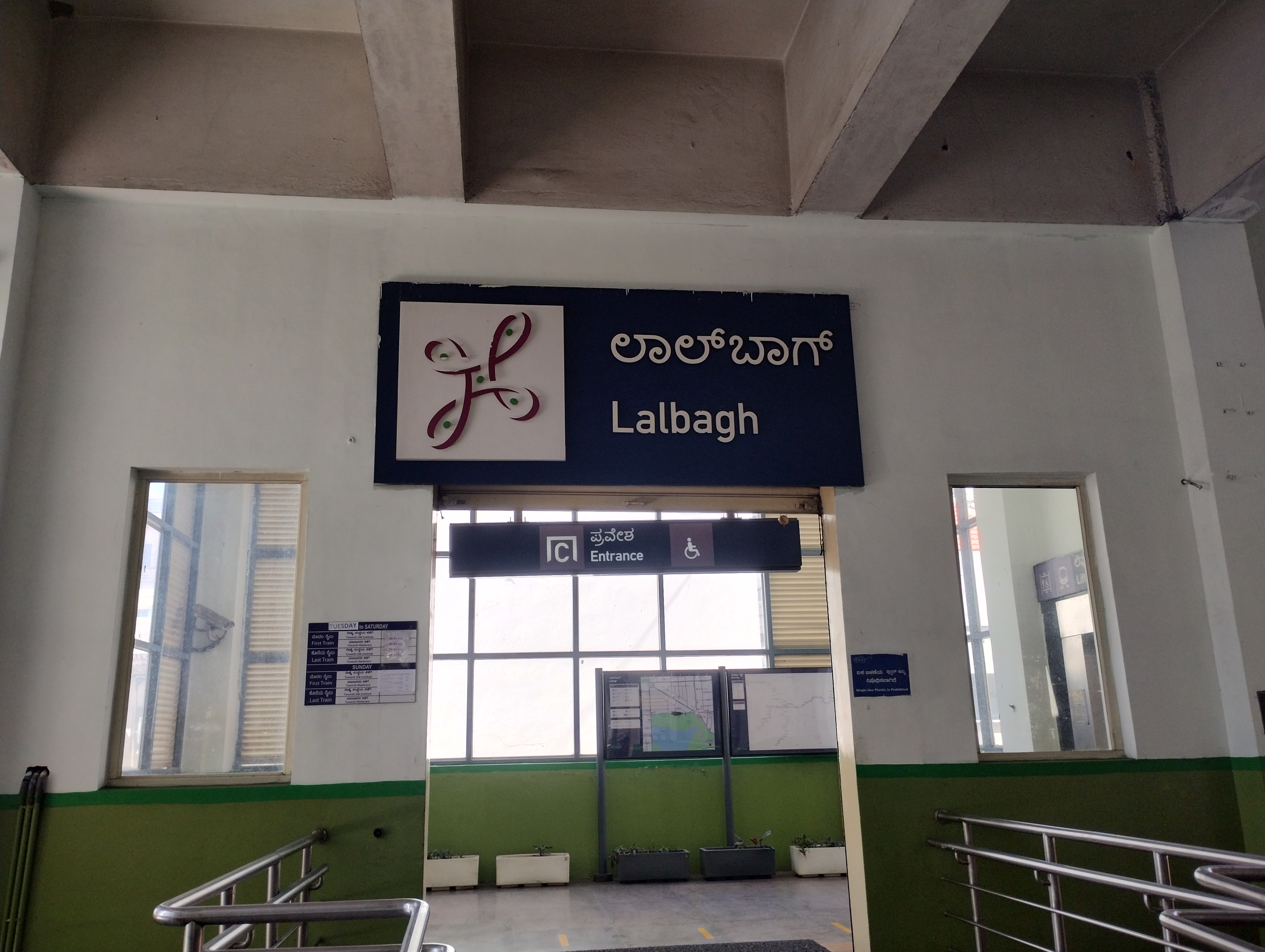
- Lalbagh metro station, January 2025

General information
- Other names: Botanical Garden
- Location: Rashtreeya Vidyalaya Road, Basavanagudi, Bengaluru, Karnataka 560004
- Coordinates: 12.946355°N 77.580050°E
- System: Namma Metro station
- Owner: Bangalore Metro Rail Corporation Ltd (BMRCL)
- Operator: Namma Metro
- Lines: Green Line; Aqua Line
- Platforms: Side platform Platform-1 → Madavara; Platform-2 → Silk Institute
- Tracks: 2

Construction
- Structure type: Elevated, Double track
- Platform levels: 2
- Accessible: Yes
- Architect: Larsen & Toubro

Other information
- Status: Staffed
- Station code: LBGH

History
- Opened: 18 June 2017; 9 years ago
- Electrified: 750 V DC third rail

Services
Preceding station	Namma Metro	Following station
National College towards Madavara	Green Line	South End Circle towards Silk Institute
Route map
Location

Lalbagh is an elevated metro station on the North-South corridor of the Green Line of Namma Metro serving the Basavanagudi area of Bengaluru, India. It was opened to the public on 18 June 2017. It services Lalbagh Botanical Garden.

== Station layout ==
G	Street level	Exit/Entrance
L1	Mezzanine	Fare control, station agent, Metro Card vending machines, crossover
L2	Side platform | Doors will open on the left
L2	Platform 2 Southbound	Towards → Silk Institute; Next Station: South End Circle
L2	Platform 1 Northbound	Towards ← Madavara; Next Station: National College
L2	Side platform | Doors will open on the left
L2

== See also ==
- Bengaluru
- List of Namma Metro stations
- Transport in Karnataka
- List of metro systems
- List of rapid transit systems in India
