= Krishna Rajendra Market metro station =

Namma Metro's Green Line metro station

Krishna Rajendra Market
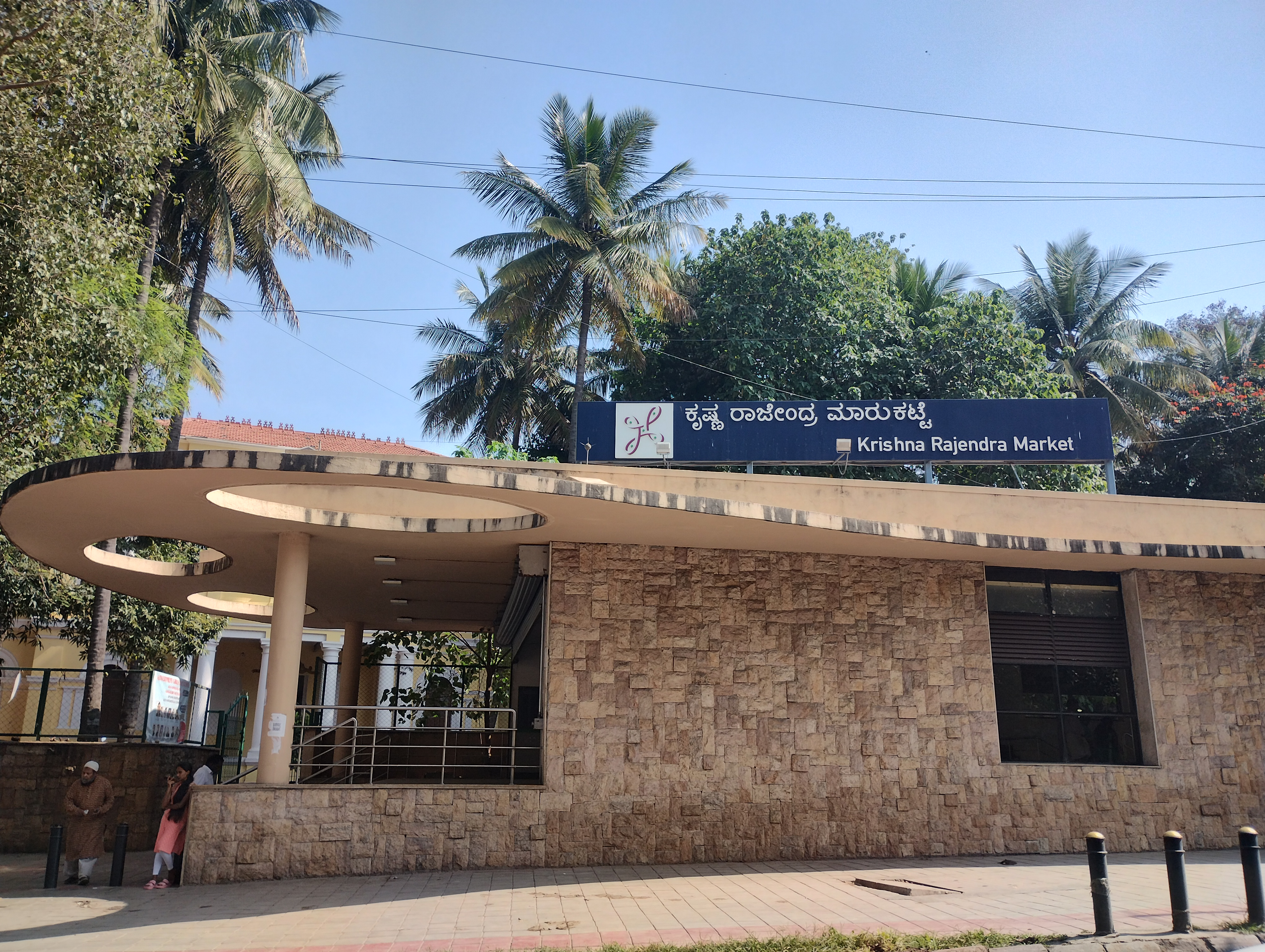

General information
- Other names: K. R. Market, Market, Kalasipalya
- Location: Krishna Rajendra Road, Kalasipalya, Bengaluru, Karnataka 560002
- Coordinates: 12.961353°N 77.574571°E
- System: Namma Metro station
- Owner: Bangalore Metro Rail Corporation Ltd (BMRCL)
- Operator: Namma Metro
- Line: Green Line
- Platforms: Island platform Platform-1 → Nagasandra; Platform-2 → Silk Institute
- Tracks: 2

Construction
- Structure type: Underground, Double track
- Depth: 60 m (200 ft)
- Platform levels: 2
- Parking: Yes
- Accessible: Yes
- Architect: COASTAL - TTS JV

Other information
- Status: Staffed
- Station code: KRMT

History
- Opened: 18 June 2017; 9 years ago
- Electrified: 750 V DC third rail

Services
Preceding station	Namma Metro	Following station
Chickpete towards Madavara	Green Line	National College towards Silk Institute
Route map
Location

Krishna Rajendra Market (also known as K. R. Market) is an underground metro station on the North-South corridor of the Green Line of Namma Metro serving K. R. Market in Bengaluru, India. It was opened to the public on 18 June 2017.

In January 2017, The Hindu reported that the station would most likely be named Fort (Kote) Station. The station is located close to several heritage sites such as Tipu Sultan's Summer Palace, his armoury in Kalasipalyam, the mud fort, Kote Venkataramana Swamy temple, and the century-old Victoria and Vanivilas hospitals. The BMRCL plans to integrate the station with the nearby landmarks, and recreate a historic ambience at the station by displaying a cannon used by Tipu Sultan at the station.

== Station layout ==
G	Street Level	Exit/ Entrance
M	Mezzanine	Fare control, station agent, Ticket/token, shops
P	Platform 2 Southbound	Towards → Silk Institute; Next Station: National College
P	Island platform | Doors will open on the right
P	Platform 1 Northbound	Towards ← Nagasandra; Next Station: Chickpete

== Facilities ==
List of available ATM at Krishna Rajendra Market metro station are as follows:-

- Kotak mahindra ATM
- Digi bank ATM
- State bank of India ATM in Lakshmi Complex (Front of Bangalore Medical College exit)

== Entry/Exits ==
There are 5 Entry/Exit points – A, B, C, D and E. Commuters can use either of the points for their travel.

- Entry/Exit point A: Towards Kalasipalya side
- Entry/Exit point B: Towards KR Market side
- Entry/Exit point C: Towards ENT Govt. Hospital side
- Entry/Exit point D: Towards Vanivilas Hospital side
- Entry/Exit point E: Towards Bangalore Fort side

== See also ==
- Bengaluru
- List of Namma Metro stations
- Transport in Karnataka
- List of metro systems
- List of rapid transit systems in India
