= National College metro station =

Namma Metro's Green Line metro station

National College

General information
- Other names: Basavanagudi
- Location: Near National College, VV Pura, Basavanagudi, Bengaluru, Karnataka 560004
- Coordinates: 12.950548°N 77.573712°E
- System: Namma Metro station
- Owner: Bangalore Metro Rail Corporation Ltd (BMRCL)
- Operator: Namma Metro
- Line: Green Line
- Platforms: Side platform Platform-1 → Madavara; Platform-2 → Silk Institute
- Tracks: 2

Construction
- Structure type: Elevated, Double track
- Platform levels: 2
- Parking: Paid parking
- Accessible: Yes
- Architect: Larsen & Toubro

Other information
- Status: Staffed
- Station code: NLC

History
- Opened: 18 June 2017; 9 years ago
- Electrified: 750 V DC third rail

Services
Preceding station	Namma Metro	Following station
Krishna Rajendra Market towards Madavara	Green Line	Lalbagh towards Silk Institute
Route map
Location

National College is an elevated metro station on the North-South corridor of the Green Line of Namma Metro serving Basavanagudi and the National College areas of Bengaluru, India. It was opened to the public on 18 June 2017.

== Station layout ==
G	Street Level	Exit/Entrance
L1	Mezzanine	Fare control, station agent, Metro Card vending machines, crossover
L2	Side platform | Doors will open on the left
L2	Platform 2 Southbound	Towards → Silk Institute; Next Station: Lalbagh
L2	Platform 1 Northbound	Towards ← Madavara; Next Station: Krishna Rajendra Market
L2	Side platform | Doors will open on the left
L2

== Entry/Exits ==
There are 3 Entry/Exit points – A, B and C. Commuters can use either of the points for their travel.

- Entry/Exit point A: Towards Vishveshwara Pura side
- Entry/Exit point B: Towards Vishveshwara Pura side
- Entry/Exit point C: Towards Shankarapura side

== See also ==
- Bengaluru
- List of Namma Metro stations
- Transport in Karnataka
- List of metro systems
- List of rapid transit systems in India
