= Jaya Prakash Nagar metro station =

Namma Metro's Green Line metro station and upcoming interchange for Orange Line

Jaya Prakash Nagar
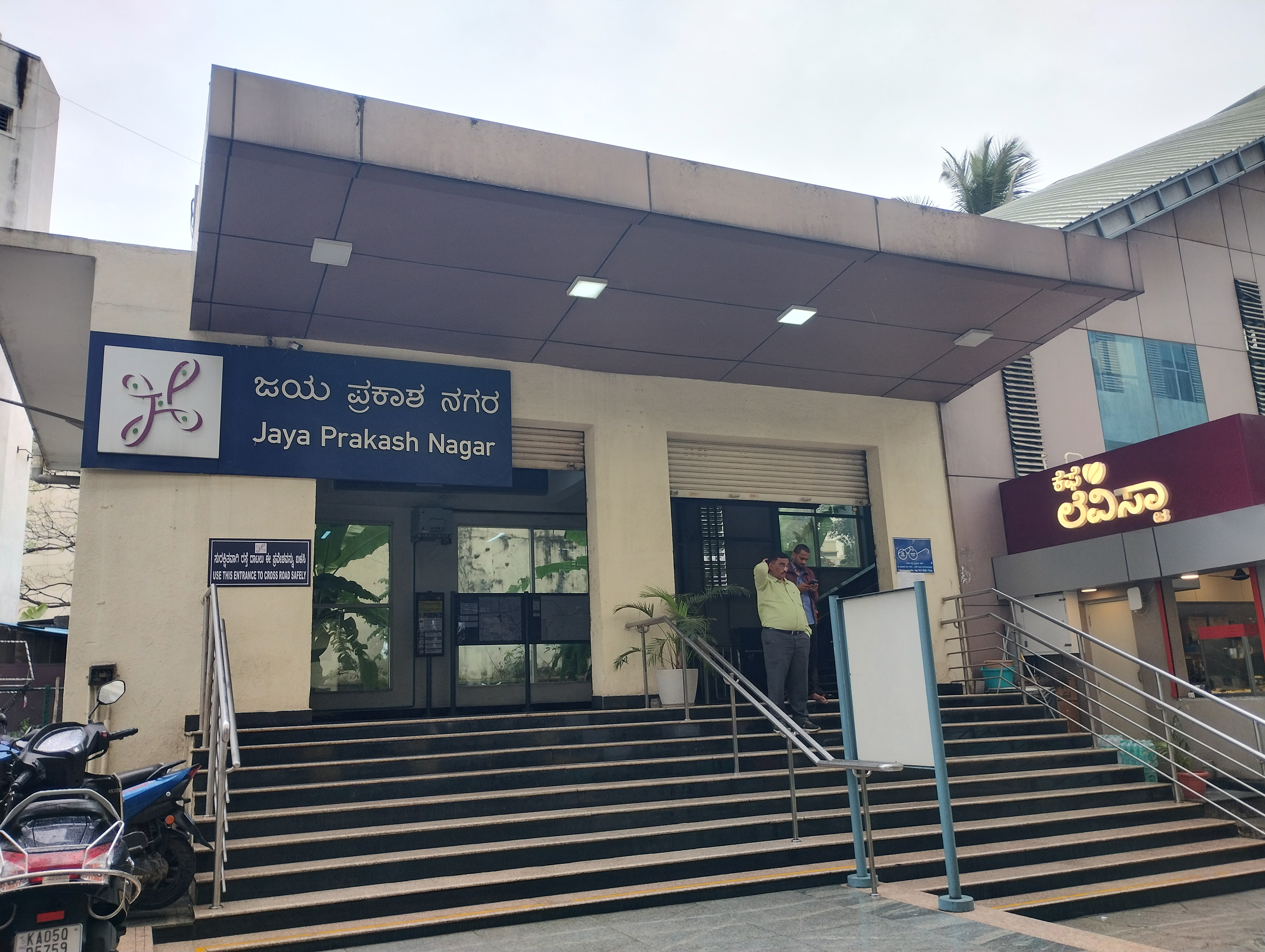

General information
- Other names: Jaya Prakash Nagara, JP Nagar, JP Nagara, Sarakki
- Location: Kanakapura Rd, Gangadhar Nagar, JP Nagar, Bengaluru, Karnataka 560078
- Coordinates: 12.907299°N 77.573133°E
- System: Namma Metro station
- Owner: Bangalore Metro Rail Corporation Ltd (BMRCL)
- Operator: Namma Metro
- Line: Green Line Orange Line
- Platforms: Side platform Platform-1 → Madavara; Platform-2 → Silk Institute (TBC)
- Tracks: 2 (current)

Construction
- Structure type: Elevated, Double track
- Platform levels: 2 (current)
- Accessible: Yes
- Architect: JMC Projects

Other information
- Status: Staffed
- Station code: JPN

History
- Opened: 18 June 2017; 9 years ago
- Electrified: 750 V DC third rail

Services
| Preceding station | Namma Metro | Following station |
|---|---|---|
| Banashankari towards Madavara | Green Line | Yelachenahalli towards Silk Institute |
| Kadirenahalli Cross towards Kempapura | Orange Line (Planned) | JP Nagar 5th Phase towards JP Nagar 4th Phase |
Route map
Location

Jaya Prakash Nagar is an elevated metro station on the north–south corridor of the Green Line of Namma Metro serving the J. P. Nagar area of Bengaluru, India. It was opened to the public on 18 June 2017, as a part of the Phase 1 network.

This metro station is proposed to be an interchange for the upcoming, proposed Orange Line.

== Station layout ==
=== Green Line Station Layout ===
| G | Street level | Exit/Entrance |
| L1 | Mezzanine | Fare control, station agent, Metro Card vending machines, crossover |
| L2 | Side platform | Doors will open on the left |
| L2 | Platform 2 Southbound | Towards → Silk Institute; Next Station: Yelachenahalli |
| L2 | Platform 1 Northbound | Towards ← Madavara; Next Station: Banashankari |
| L2 | Side platform | Doors will open on the left |
| L2 |

=== Orange Line Station Layout (TBC) ===
| G | Street level | Exit/Entrance |
| L1 | Mezzanine | Fare control, station agent, Metro Card vending machines, crossover |
| L2 | Side platform | Doors will open on the left |
| L2 | Platform # Eastbound | Towards → JP Nagar 4th Phase; Next Station: JP Nagar 5th Phase |
| L2 | Platform # Westbound | Towards ← Kempapura; Next Station: Kadirenahalli Cross |
| L2 | Side platform | Doors will open on the left |
| L2 |

== Gallery ==
Some of this metro station pictures are shown below:-

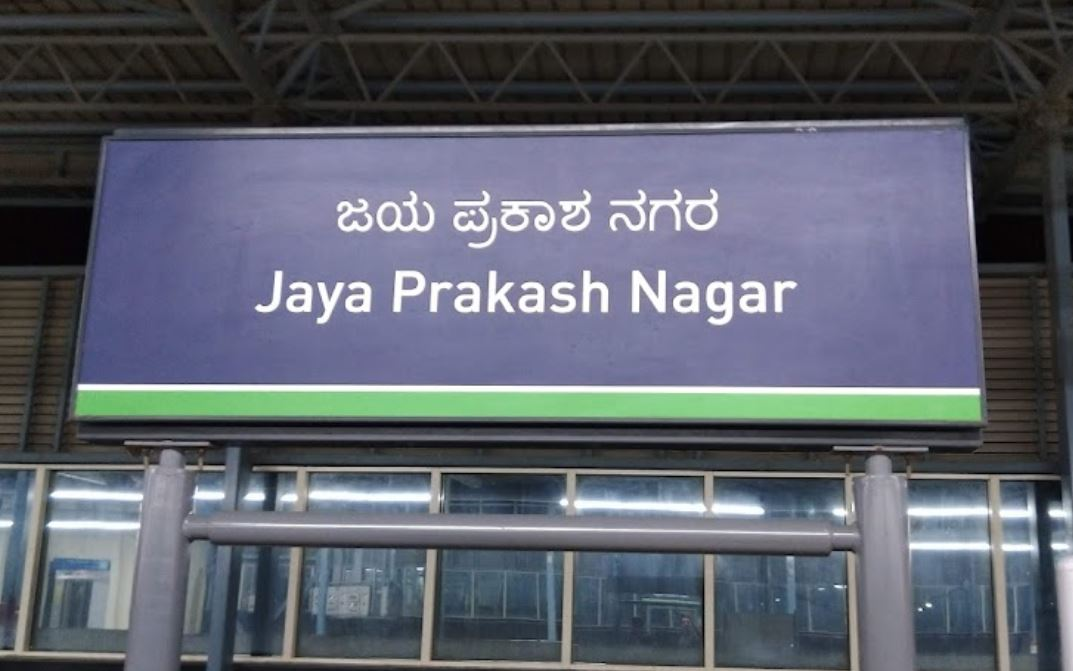
Station Board

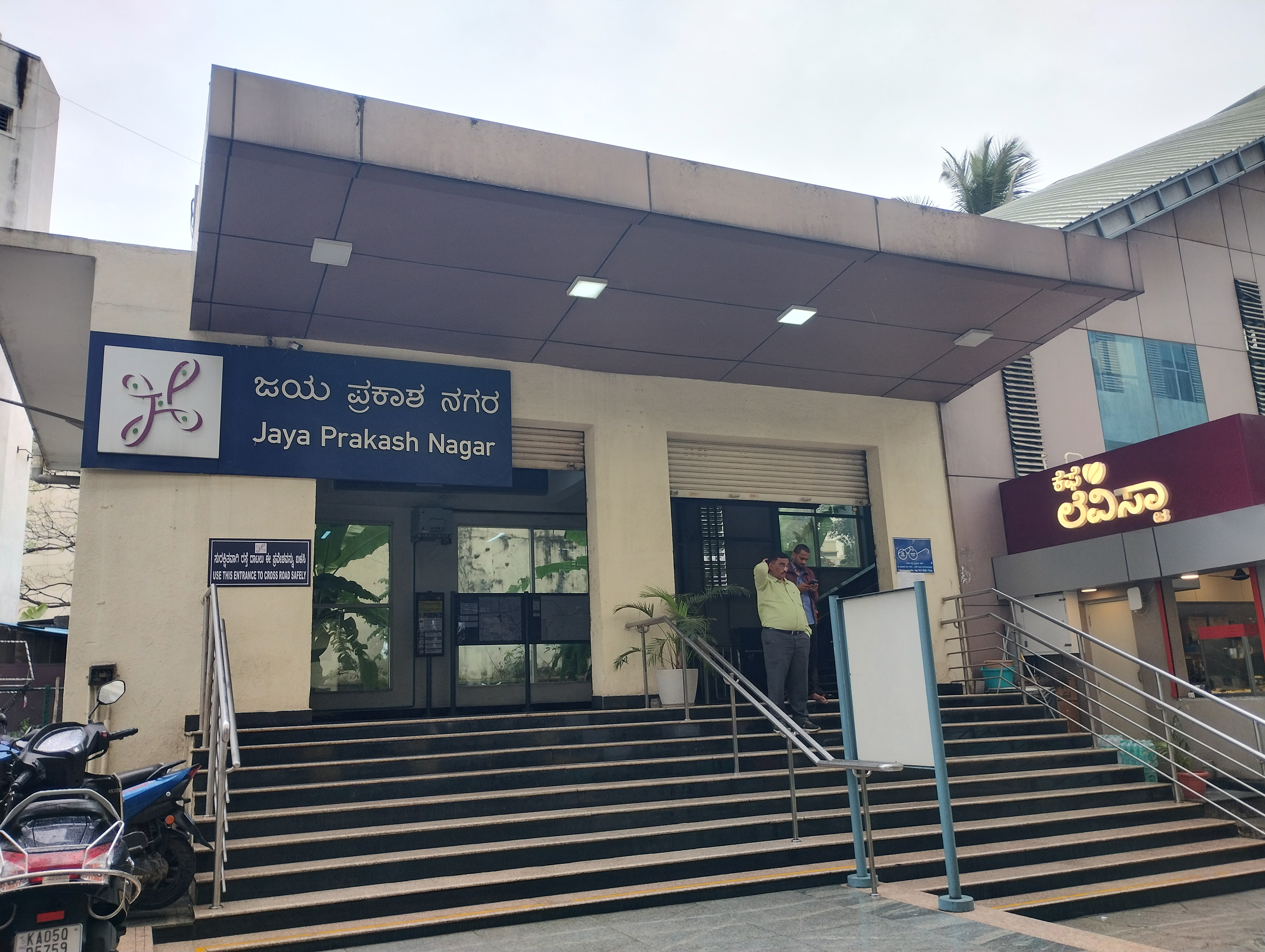
Front Entrance (2024)

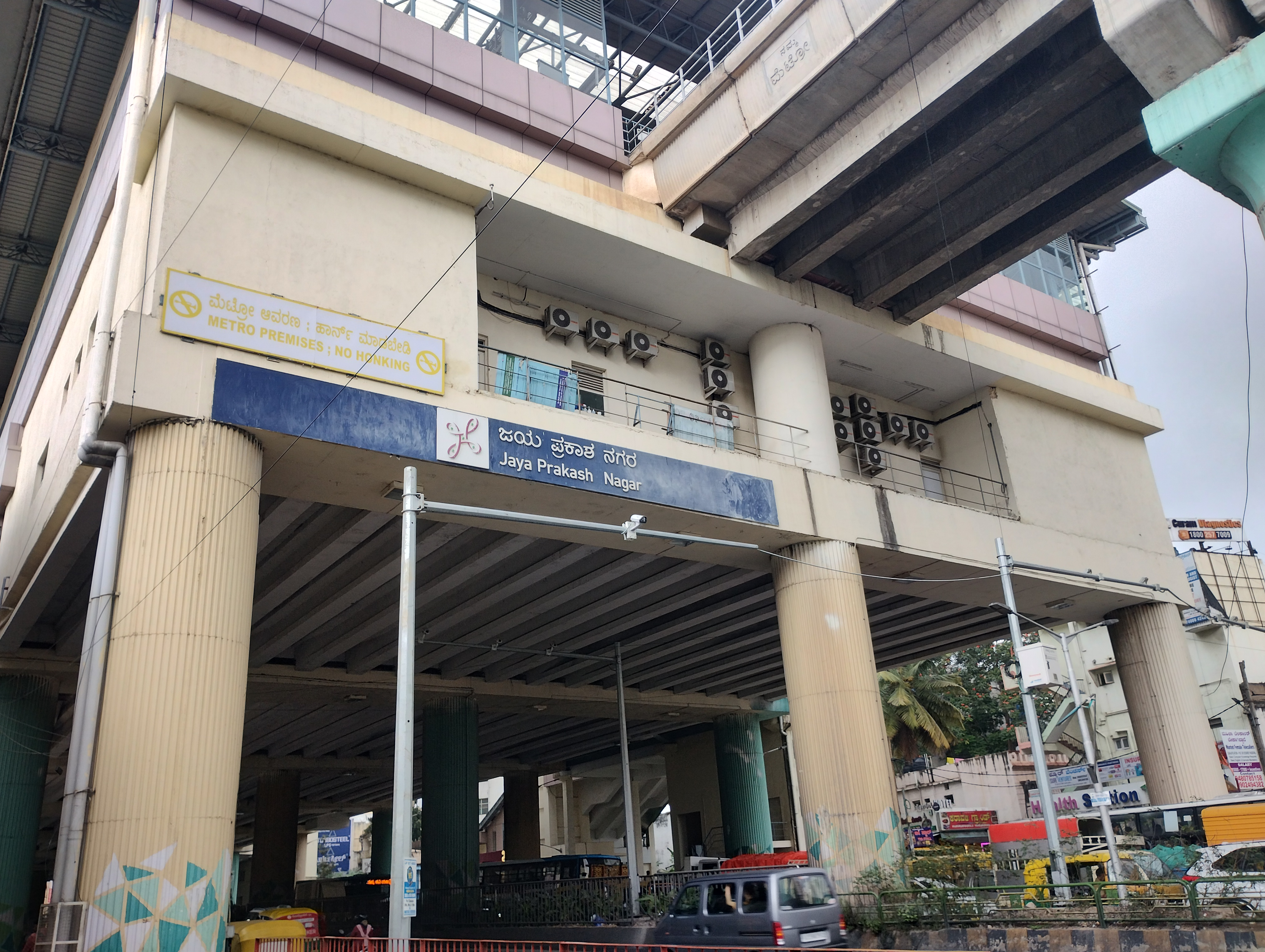
Station Building

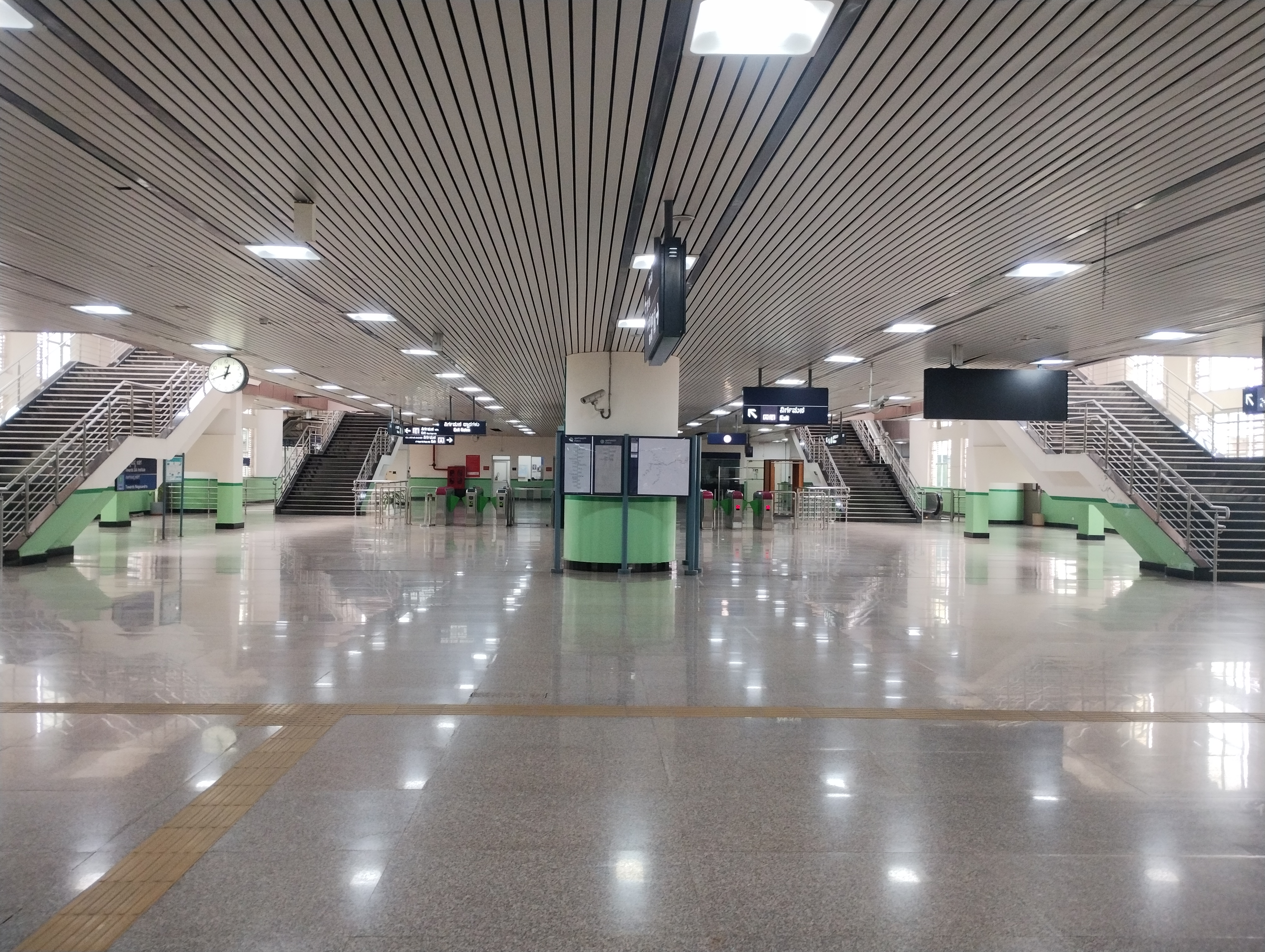
Concourse of this metro station (2024)

== Connections ==
JP Nagar metro station does not connect the Green Line to any other lines currently. However, it is proposed to be a connecting station between the Green Line and the upcoming Orange Line, which has received approvals from the state and central governments. Construction towards the interchange has not yet commenced, and the station remains a non-connecting one as of April 2026.

== Entry/exits ==
Entry/exits are situated on the Kanakapura road, one on the outer ring road side and the other on the JP nagar sixth phase side.

== See also ==
- Bengaluru
- List of Namma Metro stations
- Transport in Karnataka
- List of metro systems
- List of rapid transit systems in India
