= Vajarahalli metro station =

Namma Metro's Green Line metro station

Vajarahalli
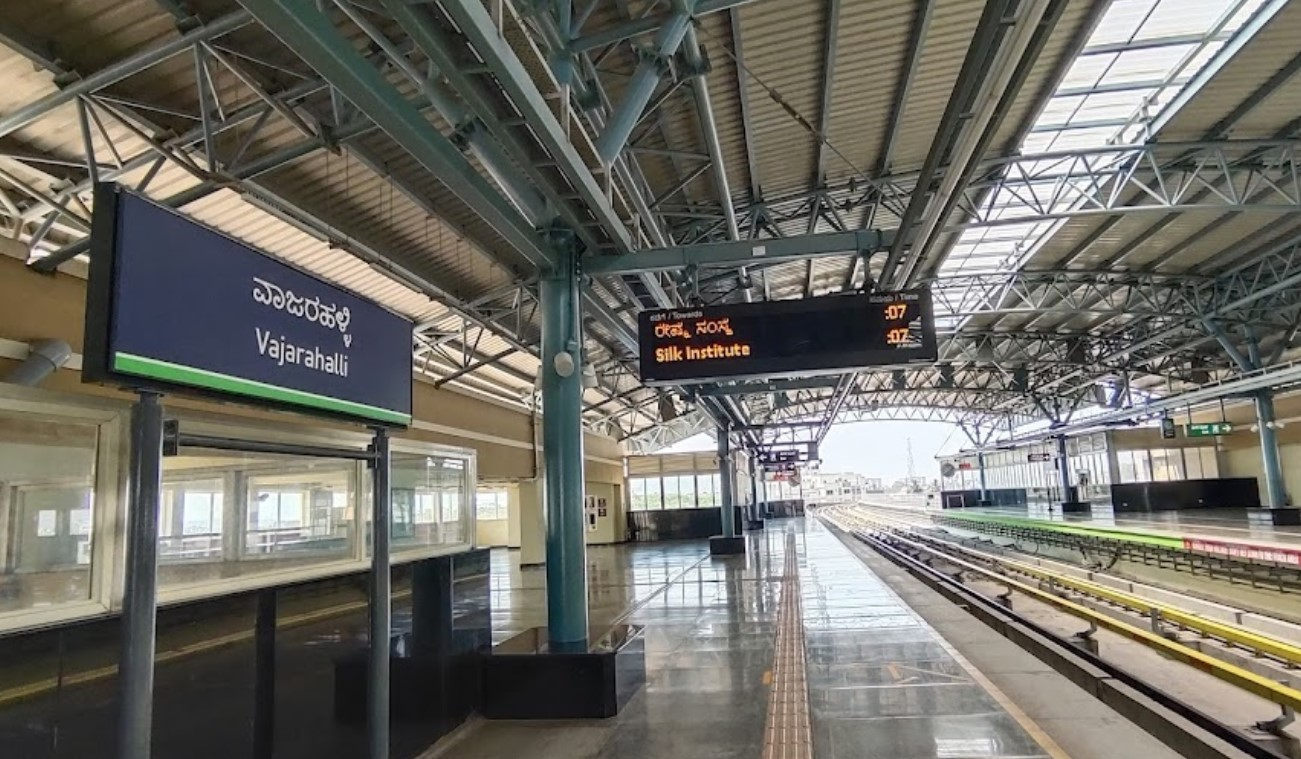
- This station leading towards Silk Institute

General information
- Location: Kanakapura Road, Vajarahalli Village, Talaghattapura, Bengaluru, Karnataka 560062
- Coordinates: 12.87745466146456°N 77.54459442247827°E
- System: Namma Metro station
- Owner: Bangalore Metro Rail Corporation Ltd (BMRCL)
- Operator: Namma Metro
- Line: Green Line
- Platforms: Side platform Platform-1 → Madavara; Platform-2 → Silk Institute
- Tracks: 2

Construction
- Structure type: Elevated, Double track
- Platform levels: 2
- Accessible: Yes
- Architect: Nagarjuna Construction Company (NCC)

Other information
- Status: Staffed
- Station code: VJRH

History
- Opened: 21 January 2021; 5 years ago
- Electrified: 750 V DC third rail

Services
Preceding station	Namma Metro	Following station
Doddakallasandra towards Madavara	Green Line	Thalaghattapura towards Silk Institute
Route map
Location

Vajarahalli is an elevated metro station on the North-South corridor of the Green Line of Namma Metro in Bengaluru, India. This station was opened on 21 January 2021 to the public. The station was inaugurated along with five other stations, as a part of the Green Line extension.

== Station layout ==
G	Street level	Exit/Entrance
L1	Mezzanine	Fare control, station agent, Metro Card vending machines, crossover
L2	Side platform | Doors will open on the left
L2	Platform 2 Southbound	Towards → Silk Institute; Next Station: Thalaghattapura
L2	Platform 1 Northbound	Towards ← Madavara; Next Station: Doddakallasandra
L2	Side platform | Doors will open on the left
L2

Video of a metro train arriving at the station

== Entry/Exits ==
There are 2 Entry/Exit points – A and B. Commuters can use either of the points for their travel.

- Entry/Exit point A: Towards Bayanapalya (Magnum Honda Showroom)
- Entry/Exit point B: Towards Raghuvanahalli (DMart Kanakapura Road)

== See also ==
- Bengaluru
- Green Line
- List of Namma Metro stations
- Transport in Karnataka
- List of metro systems
- List of rapid transit systems in India
