= Thalaghattapura metro station =

Namma Metro's Green Line metro station

Thalaghattapura
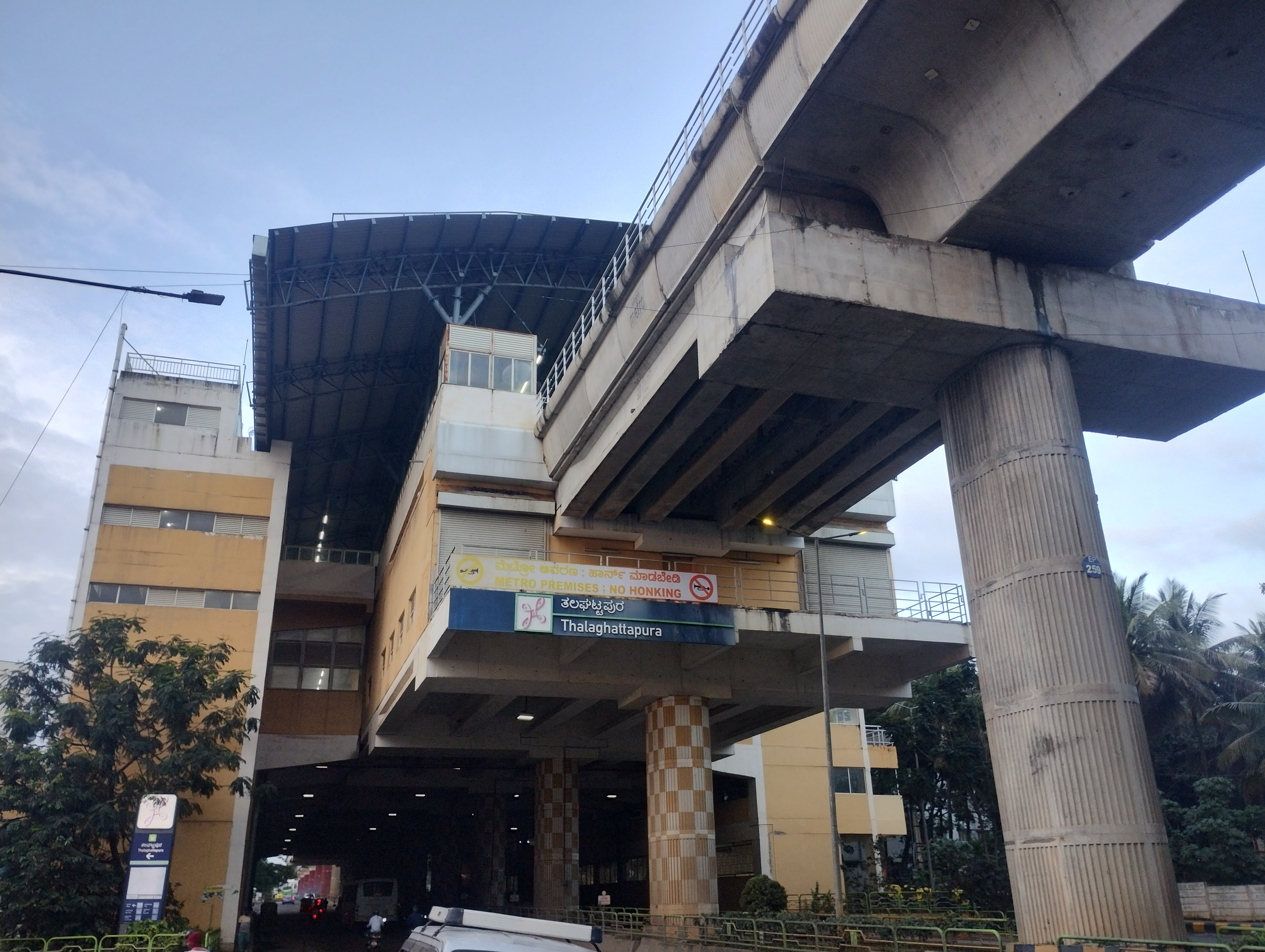
- A Green Line Namma Metro train at this metro station leading towards Silk Institute (southbound) or towards Madavara (northbound)

General information
- Other names: Paramount Gardens
- Location: 15/3, Kanakapura Rd, Paramount Gardens, Talaghattapura, Bengaluru, Karnataka 560062
- Coordinates: 12°52′18″N 77°32′20″E
- System: Namma Metro station
- Owner: Bangalore Metro Rail Corporation Ltd (BMRCL)
- Operator: Namma Metro
- Line: Green Line
- Platforms: Side platform Platform-1 → Madavara; Platform-2 → Silk Institute
- Tracks: 2

Construction
- Structure type: Elevated, double track
- Platform levels: 2
- Accessible: Yes
- Architect: Nagarjuna Construction Company (NCC)

Other information
- Status: Staffed
- Station code: TGTP

History
- Opened: 21 January 2021; 5 years ago
- Electrified: 750 V DC third rail

Services
Preceding station	Namma Metro	Following station
Vajarahalli towards Madavara	Green Line	Silk Institute Terminus
Route map
Location

Thalaghattapura is an elevated metro station on the North-South corridor of the Green Line of Namma Metro in Bengaluru, India. This station was opened on 21 January 2021 to the public. The station was inaugurated along with five other stations, as a part of the Green Line extension.

== Station layout ==
G	Street level	Exit/entrance
L1	Mezzanine	Fare control, station agent, Metro Card vending machines, crossover
L2	Side platform | Doors will open on the left
L2	Platform 2 Southbound	Towards → Silk Institute
L2	Platform 1 Northbound	Towards ← Madavara; Next station: Vajarahalli
L2	Side platform | Doors will open on the left
L2

== Entry/exits ==
There are two entry/exit points – A and B. Commuters can use either for their travel.

- Entry/exit point A: towards post office side
- Entry/exit point B: towards SJS Enterprises Pvt. Ltd. side

== See also ==
- Bengaluru
- Green Line
- List of Namma Metro stations
- Transport in Karnataka
- List of metro systems
- List of rapid transit systems in India
