= Orange Line (Namma Metro) =

Proposed line of Bengaluru's Namma Metro

Overview
- Other names: ORR West Line; Line 6; Kempapura–JP Nagara 4th Phase Line
- Native name: Kittaḷe mārga
- Status: Approved
- Owner: Bangalore Metro Rail Corporation Limited (BMRCL)
- Locale: Bangalore, Karnataka, India
- Termini: Kempapura; JP Nagar 4th Phase
- Connecting lines: Operational (3): Purple Line Green Line Pink Line; Upcoming (3): Blue Line Red Line Grey Line
- Stations: 22
- Website: bmrc.co.in

Service
- Type: Metro
- System: Namma Metro
- Depot: Magadi Road (TBD)

History
- Planned opening: 2036; 10 years' time

Technical
- Line length: 32.15 km (19.98 mi)
- Num of tracks: 2
- Character: Elevated (TBD)
- Track gauge: 1,435 mm (4 ft 8 1/2 in) standard gauge
- Electrification: 750 V DC third rail

The Orange Line is an upcoming metro line serving Bangalore as part of the Namma Metro network in the city, connecting Kempapura with JP Nagar 4th Phase. This metro line will serve the industrial areas, (Note: Peenya Industrial Area, IT Industries on Bannerghatta Main Road) manufacturing units, (Note: Engineering and Textile Manufacturing Units on Tumkur Road, Bharat Electronics Limited (BEL)) educational institutions, (Note: PES University, Ambedkar College, Polytechnic College, KLE College, Dayananda Sagar University) providing connectivity to the southern part of the city, (Note: Outer Ring Road West Side, Magadi Road with its neighbouring areas) thereby improving last-mile connectivity to commercial centres, industrial hubs, educational institutions, and healthcare facilities. The line was approved by the Union Cabinet on August 17, 2024 and is scheduled for completion in 2031.

The line passes through the western part of Outer Ring Road and passes through many major industrial areas, educational institutions and neighbourhoods of the city, such as Hebbal, BEL Circle, Goraguntepalya, Sumanahalli, Nagarabhavi, Mysuru Road, Hosakerehalli and Jaya Prakash Nagar.

The Orange Line will have interchanges with the Blue Line at Kempapura and Hebbal, Red Line at Hebbal, Green Line at Peenya and Jaya Prakash Nagar, Grey Line at Sumanahalli Cross, Purple Line at Mysuru Road and Pink Line at JP Nagar 4th Phase.

== History ==
=== Initial Planning ===
BMRCL began planning Namma Metro Phase-III in 2013, shortly after announcing Phase-II, which included the Yellow Line and Pink Line. Later in June 2013 BMRCL partnered with RITES Limited to conduct a pre-feasibility study for each proposed corridor

By 2016, BMRCL submitted its Phase-III proposal to the Ministry of Urban Development, which initially spanned 150.94 km. However, following the feasibility the network size was reduced to 102 km, with the remaining corridors being planned for Light Rail. The proposed lines were

- Nagavara - Kempegowda International Airport
- Carmelaram - Yelahanka
- Marathahalli - Hosakerehalli
- Silkboard - Hebbal via KR Puram.

However, in 2017 the Karnataka Government announced that the Silkboard - Hebbal line and the Nagavara - Airport line were merged to create the Blue Line and fast tracked to Phase 2A and Phase 2B.

In 2018 the Karnataka Government officially confirmed Phase III with several modifications. Multiple new lines were introduced while some others were dropped. Following another round of modifications in 2020, only two lines were finalized to be part of Phase-III

- Magadi Road Toll Gate to Kadabagere line
- JP Nagar to Kempapura

In July 2020, RITES Limited was assigned to prepare the Detailed Project Report (DPR) work for Phase-III. RITES submitted the DPR to the State Government who approved it in November 2022. The final approval was received from the Central Government in August 2024 paving the way for BMRCL to start land acquisition and tender notification.

== Tendering ==
As of January 2025 BMRCL has issued tenders for Geotechnical Investigations and Detailed Design Consultancy (DDC). Once the Geotechnical Investigations are finished and finalized with the DDC BMRCL plans to release the Civil Work Tender.

Pre-Construction Activity
Tendering	Section	Activity	Successful Bid /Cost	Contractor	Award
Phase-3/GTI/2024/109/ Pkg-1	JP Nagar 4th Phase to Mysore Road	Geotechnical Investigation	₹1.32 crore (US$140,000)	Manglam Consultancy	23 Jul 2024
Phase-3/GTI/2024/109/ Pkg-2	Mysore Road to Kanteerava Studio	Geotechnical Investigation	₹1.31 crore (US$140,000)	SECON	23 Jul 2024
Phase-3/GTI/2024/109/ Pkg-3	Kanteerava Studio to Kempapura	Geotechnical Investigation	₹1.32 crore (US$140,000)	Myrtle Project	23 Jul 2024
Phase-3/GTI/2024/109/ Pkg-4	Hosahalli to Kadabagere	Geotechnical Investigation	₹1.54 crore (US$160,000)	SECON	23 Jul 2024
Phase-3/EIA&SIA/RFP/2024/114	SIA, RIP, IEE, EMP, Noise & Vibration Study		₹0.64 crore (US$68,000)	Monarch Consultants	04 Jan 2025
Phase-3/DDC1/RFP/2024/115	JP Nagar 4th Phase to BDA Complex Nagarbhavi	Detailed Design Consultant	₹9.95 crore (US$1.1 million)	SYSTRA MVA	15 Mar 2025
Phase-3/DDC2/RFP/2024/116	Sumanahalli Cross to Kempapura	Detailed Design Consultant	₹8.72 crore (US$930,000)	Assystem	15 Mar 2025
Phase-3/DDC3/RFP/2024/117	Hosahalli Station to Kadabagere	Detailed Design Consultant	₹10.70 crore (US$1.1 million)	SYSTRA MVA	15 Mar 2025
EPDD-5	Traction and Power Supply	Detailed Design Consultant	Bidding Underway		
Total			₹35.5 crore (US$3.8 million)		
Civil Work
Tendering	Section	Length	Successful Bid /Cost	Contractor	Award
Ph-3/Double Decker/P1/2026/143	JP Nagar 4th Phase to Kamakya Bus Depot	6.521 km (4.052 mi)	Bidding Underway		
Ph-3/Double Decker/P2/2026/144	Kamakya Bus Depot to Nagarbhavi	5.408 km (3.360 mi)	Bidding Underway		
Ph-3/Double Decker/P3/2026/145	Nagarbhavi to Sumanahalli Cross	6.652 km (4.133 mi)	Bidding Underway		
Total		32.15 km (19.98 mi)	₹0 crore (US$0.00) Bidding Underway		

== Funding ==
As per the initial Detailed Project Report (DPR) line is estimated to cost Rs.15,611 crores. The cost includes the construction of both new metro lines along with flyovers, which will be built along the metro pillars. The funding is at the moment planned at

- Government of Karnataka (Equity): Rs.2,037 crores
- Government of India (Equity): Rs.2,037 crores
- Government of Karnataka Subordinated debt for land & RR: Rs. 2019 crores
- GOK Subordinated debt for central taxes: Rs. 489 crores
- GOI Subordinated debt for central taxes: Rs. 489 crores
- External Debt: Rs. 7577 crores

== Stations ==
=== Interchanges ===
Passenger interchange facilities, connecting to other metro and railway lines, are proposed at the following station

- Kempapura (Connects to the Blue Line, which runs between Central Silk Board and KIAL Terminals)
- Hebbala (Connects to the Blue Line, which runs between Central Silk Board and KIAL Terminals and to the Red Line, which runs from Hebbala to Sarjapura)
- Peenya (connects to the Green Line, which runs between Madavara and Silk Institute)
- Sumanahalli Cross (Connects to the Grey Line, which runs from Hosahalli to Kadabagere)
- Mysuru Road (Connects to the Purple Line, which runs from Whitefield (Kadugodi) to Challaghatta)
- Jaya Prakash Nagar (Connects to the Green Line, which runs between Madavara and Silk Institute)
- JP Nagar 4th Phase (Connects to the Pink Line, which runs between Nagawara and Kalena Agrahara)

Orange Line
#	Station Name		Connections	Station Type	Platform Type
#	English	Kannada	Connections	Station Type	Platform Type
1	Kempapura	ಕೆಂಪಾಪುರ	Blue Line (Under Construction)	Elevated	TBC
2	Hebbala	ಹೆಬ್ಬಾಳ	Blue Line (Under Construction) Red Line (Pending Central Approval)	Elevated	TBC
3	Nagashetty halli	ನಾಗಶೆಟ್ಟಿಹಳ್ಳಿ		Elevated	TBC
4	BEL Circle	ಬಿ ಇ ಎಲ್ ವೃತ್ತ		Elevated	TBC
5	Muthyalanagar	ಮುತ್ಯಾಲನಗರ		Elevated	TBC
6	Peenya	ಪೀಣ್ಯ	Green Line	Elevated	TBC
7	Kanteerava Nagar	ಕಂಠೀರವ ನಗರ		Elevated	TBC
8	Freedom Fighters Colony	ಸ್ವಾತಂತ್ರ್ಯ ಹೋರಾಟಗಾರರ ಕಾಲೋನಿ		Elevated	TBC
9	Prem Nagar	ಪ್ರೇಮ್ ನಗರ		Elevated	TBC
10	Sumanahalli Cross	ಸುಮನಹಳ್ಳಿ ಕ್ರಾಸ್	Grey Line (Approved)	Elevated	TBC
11	Nagarbhavi BDA Complex	ನಾಗರಬಾವಿ ಬಿ ಡಿ ಎ ಸಂಕೀರ್ಣ		Elevated	TBC
12	Papareddy Palya	ಪಾಪರೆಡ್ಡಿ ಪಾಳ್ಯ		Elevated	TBC
13	Vinayaka Layout	ವಿನಾಯಕ ಬಡಾವಣೆ		Elevated	TBC
14	Nagarabhavi Circle	ನಾಗರಬಾವಿ ವೃತ್ತ		Elevated	TBC
15	Mysuru Road	ಮೈಸೂರು ರಸ್ತೆ	Purple Line	Elevated	TBC
16	Dwarka Nagar	ದ್ವಾರಕಾ ನಗರ		Elevated	TBC
17	Hosakerahalli	ಹೊಸಕೆರೆಹಳ್ಳಿ		Elevated	TBC
18	Kamakya Bus Depot	ಕಾಮಾಕ್ಯ ಬಸ್‌ ಘಟಕ	Kamakya Bus Depot	Elevated	TBC
19	Kadirenahalli	ಕದಿರೇನಹಳ್ಳಿ		Elevated	TBC
20	Jaya Prakash Nagar	ಜಯಪ್ರಕಾಶ ನಗರ	Green Line	Elevated	TBC
21	Jaya Prakash Nagar 5th Phase	ಜಯಪ್ರಕಾಶ ನಗರ ೫ನೇ ಹಂತ		Elevated	TBC
22	N.S. Palya - J.P. Nagar 4th Phase	ಎನ್. ಎಸ್. ಪಾಳ್ಯ - ಜ.ಪಿ. ನಗರ 4ನೇ ಹಂತ	Pink Line	Elevated	Island & Side

== Integration of the key areas of the city ==
These are the notable areas that will be integrated as part of the Phase 3 of Namma Metro and they are as given below:-

== See also ==
- Namma Metro
  - Purple Line
  - Green Line
  - Yellow Line
  - Pink Line
  - Blue Line
  - Grey Line
  - Red Line
  - Inner Ring Line
  - List of Namma Metro Stations
- Rapid transit in India
- List of metro systems
