= Konanakunte =

- Neighborhood
- Location within Bengaluru
- Coordinates: 12.881°N 77.572°E
- Country: India
- State: Karnataka
- District: Bangalore Urban
- Metro: Bangalore
- Zone: Bommanahalli
- Ward: 195
  - Rank: >140 out of 198

Population (2001)
  - Total: 13,262

Languages
  - Official: Kannada
- Time zone: UTC+5:30 (IST)
- PIN: 560062
- Telephone code: 91-80
- Vehicle registration: KA 05
- Lok Sabha constituency: Bangalore Rural
- Vidhan Sabha constituency: Bangalore South

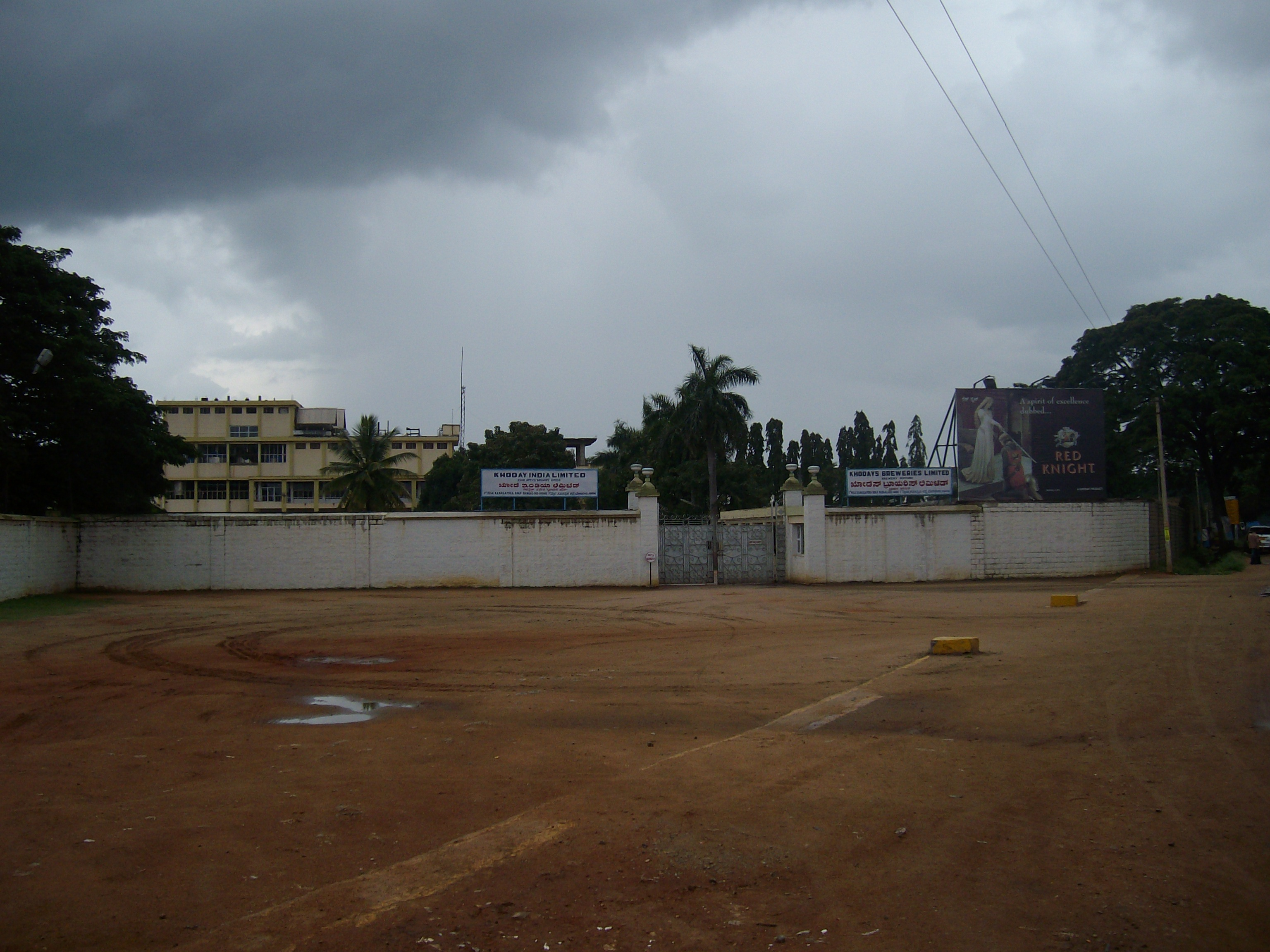

Konanakunte, formerly a census town, is a suburb of Bangalore in the Indian state of Karnataka.

== Demographics ==
As of 2001 India census, Konanakunte had a population of 13,262. Males constitute 54% of the population and females 46%. Konanakunte has an average literacy rate of 77%, higher than the national average of 59.5%: male literacy is 81%, and female literacy is 73%. In Konanakunte, 11% of the population is under 6 years of age.

== Brief Description ==
Over the last two decades, Konanakunte has undergone transition from a secluded area on the city's outskirts having only graveyards and grape wines to a partially developed, semi urban residential area. The name "Konanakunte" likely means "buffalo pond". Harijan colony in Konanakunte, a small area occupied by slum dwellers had a natural pond, which was put into use as a source of drinking water for buffalos. The vast portion of Konanakunte was filled with cultivation of crops such as avarekai, huchellu & ragi to name a few. It gained popularity during the assassination of Rajiv Gandhi in early 1990s. The main accused Shivarasan along with his aides was found to be hiding here. The only landmark in the area was the huge Khoday's factory, employing local people. Over the years, Konanakunte has experienced a great deal of development in terms of population infrastructure and urbanization. But urbanization has brought along with it the evils such as improper civic amenities and security issues. The area has come under the influence of cosmopolitan life but without forgoing the characters of a typical Indian village. The city of Bangalore is attracting immigration from all parts of the country. Konanakunte once known as the sleeping village on the city's outskirts known only for farming and underemployment is today a sprawling locality with people of various origins making it their home. The main attraction in this colony and the crux of the issue is the booming real estate opportunities. Thousands of hectares of land in and around Konanakunte has been converted into residential layouts and the value of land had gone up in geometrical proportions. In spite of the area attracting inhabitants and business, civic amenities are as low as it could be infrastructure like stable roads; drainage, streetlights, security and medical facilities are not in place.This area lacks Cauvery water isn't available.With the completion of the ambitious Namma Metro project, Konanakunte has become much more easily accessible and hence it is foreseen that a further surge in the population of this area will occur.
