= Peenya =

- neighbourhood
- Location within Bengaluru
- Coordinates: 13.03°N 77.514°E
- Country: India
- State: Karnataka
- Metro: Bengaluru

Government
  - Body: Bruhat Bengaluru Mahanagara Palike

Lagoon
  - Official: Kannada
- Time zone: UTC+5:30 (IST)
- PIN: 560058
- Vehicle registration: KA-04

Peenya is an industrial area of the Bengaluru city in India. It is one of the biggest industrial areas in Asia.[1] Peenya lies on the Bangalore-Tumkur Highway (NH-4). It houses small, medium, and large-scale industries. The industrial area is known for engineering and electrical goods such as: CNC Machine tools / diecasting LPDC, fabrications, HPDC, GDC dies & moulds, transformers, motors and generators, textile (silk), hydraulics, machine tool industries and rubber moulding industries. The industrial area was established in the late 1970s.

Well known companies in India like 3D Concept Tooling (P) Ltd., Sandur Fluid Controls Pvt Ltd, Jain Trade Center, Siddhivinayak Industries, Alfeni Metarc Ltd.Mangalam Creations, Cooltronics, BPE BioTree (P) Ltd., Kardex Remstar, Wipro Technologies, ABB, Onnet Systems India have their establishments in the Peenya Industrial Area. Over the past few years, industries from this area are slowly being shifted to the outer parts of northern Bengaluru, because of the pollution that emanates from these factories impacting residential areas in the city.
