= Silk Institute metro station =

Namma Metro's Green Line terminal metro station

Silk Institute
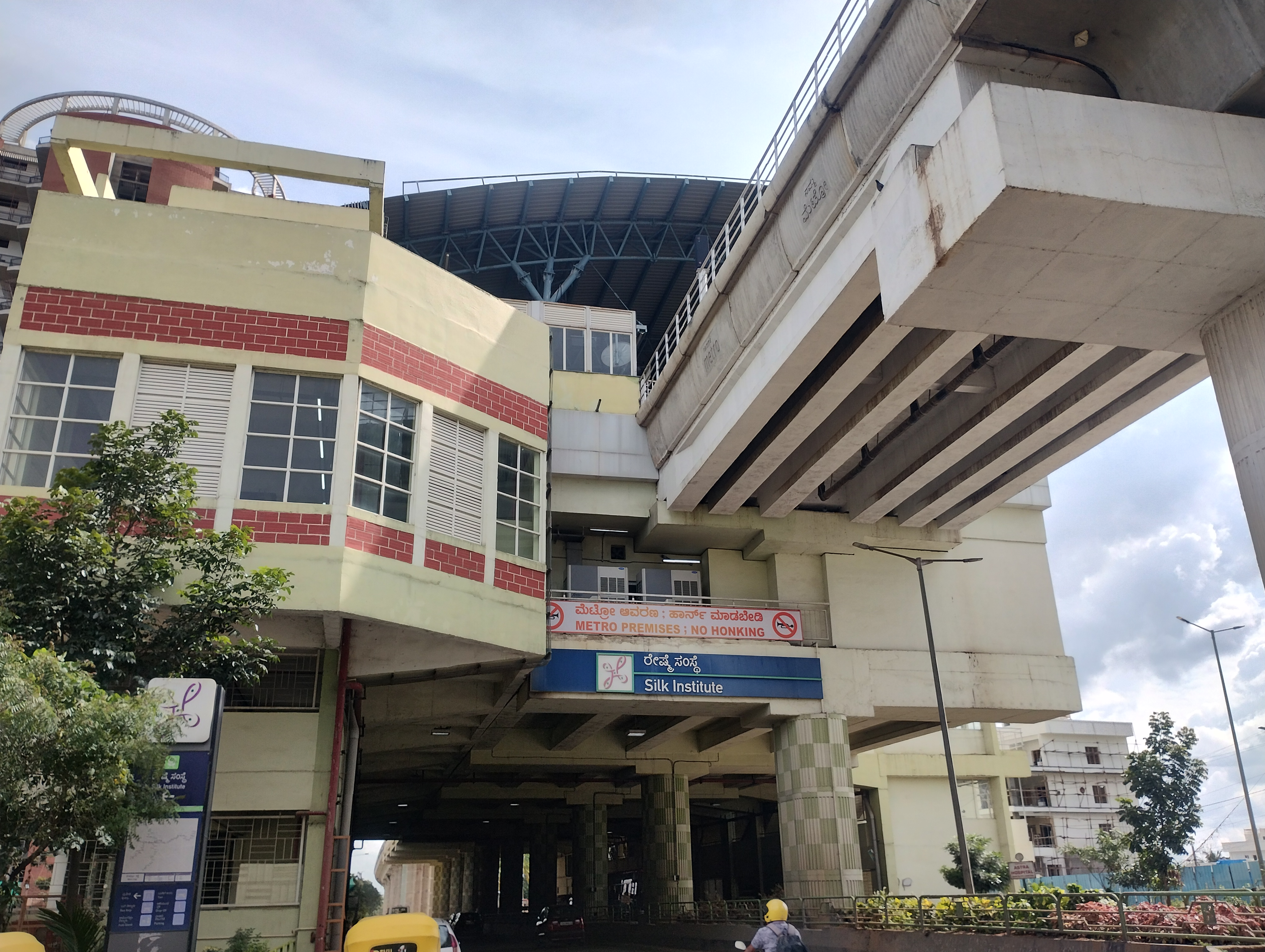
- The station in 2025

General information
- Other names: VISL Layout, Anjanapura, Anjanapura Township
- Location: Kanakapura Rd, VISL Layout, Talaghattapura, Bengaluru, Karnataka 560062
- Coordinates: 12°51′43″N 77°31′48″E
- System: Namma Metro station
- Owner: Bangalore Metro Rail Corporation Ltd (BMRCL)
- Operator: Namma Metro
- Line: Green Line
- Platforms: Side platform Platform-1 → Madavara; Platform-2 → Train terminates here
- Tracks: 2

Construction
- Structure type: Elevated, double track
- Platform levels: 2
- Accessible: Yes
- Architect: Nagarjuna Construction Company (NCC)

Other information
- Status: Staffed
- Station code: APTS

History
- Opened: 21 January 2021; 5 years ago
- Electrified: 750 V DC third rail

Services
Preceding station	Namma Metro	Following station
Thalaghattapura towards Madavara	Green Line	Terminus
Route map
Location

Silk Institute (formerly called Anjanapura or Anjanapura Township) is the elevated southern terminal metro station on the North-South corridor of the Green Line of Namma Metro in Bengaluru, India. This station was opened on 21 January 2021 to the public. It was inaugurated along with five other stations, as a part of the Green Line extension. It is named after Karnataka State Sericulture Research and Development Institute, located at Kanakapura road.

== Station layout ==
G	Street level	Exit/entrance
L1	Mezzanine	Fare control, station agent, Metro Card vending machines, crossover
L2	Side platform | Doors will open on the left
L2	Platform 2 Southbound	Towards → Train terminates here
L2	Platform 1 Northbound	Towards ← Madavara; Next station: Thalaghattapura
L2	Side platform | Doors will open on the left

== Entry/exits ==
There are two entry/exit points – A and B. Commuters can use either for their travel.

- Entry/exit point A: towards Judicial Layout (BDA) side
- Entry/exit point B: towards Jyothi Farm side

== See also ==
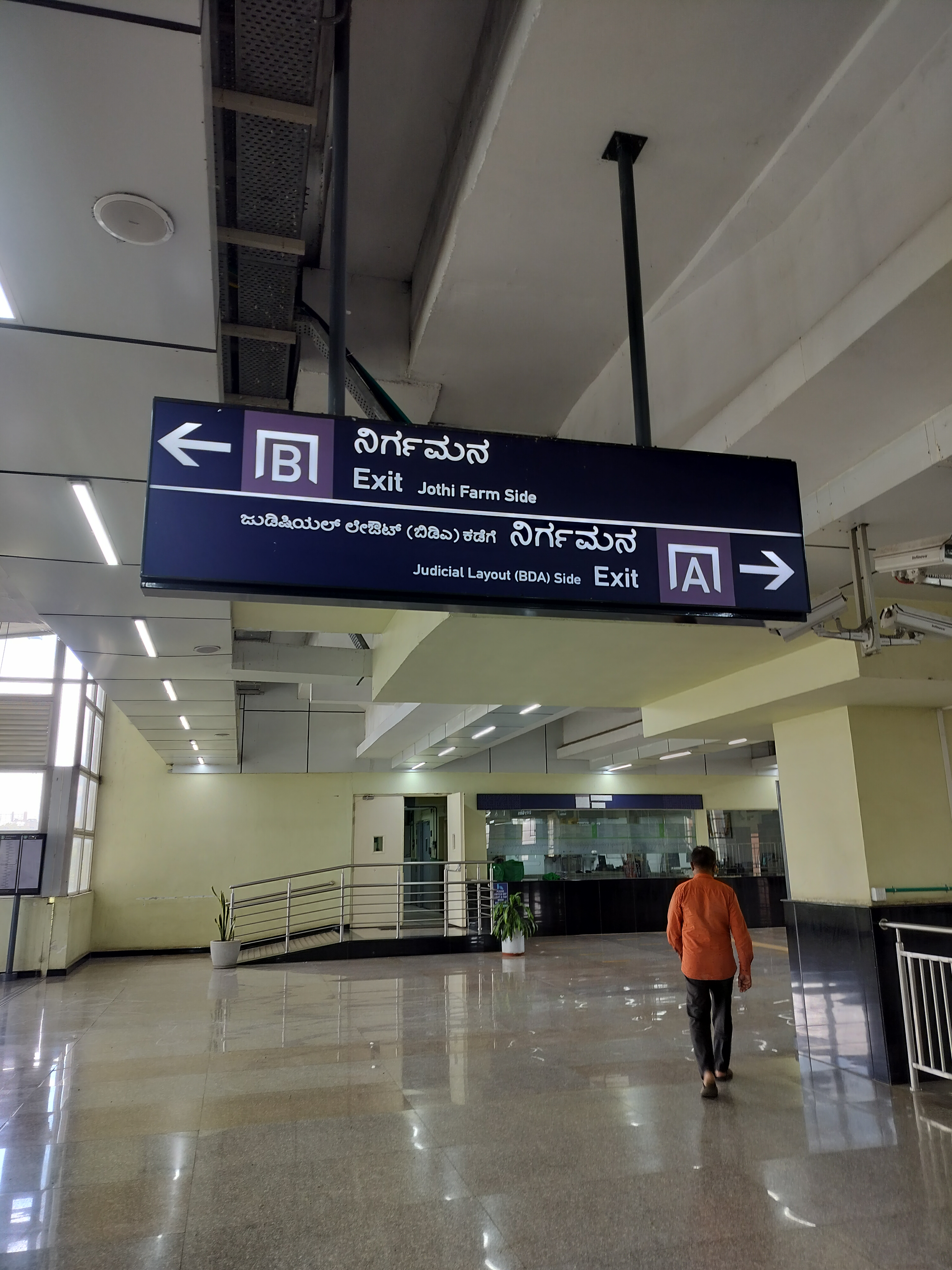
Overhead sign showing the directions to the exits of the Silk Institute Metro Station

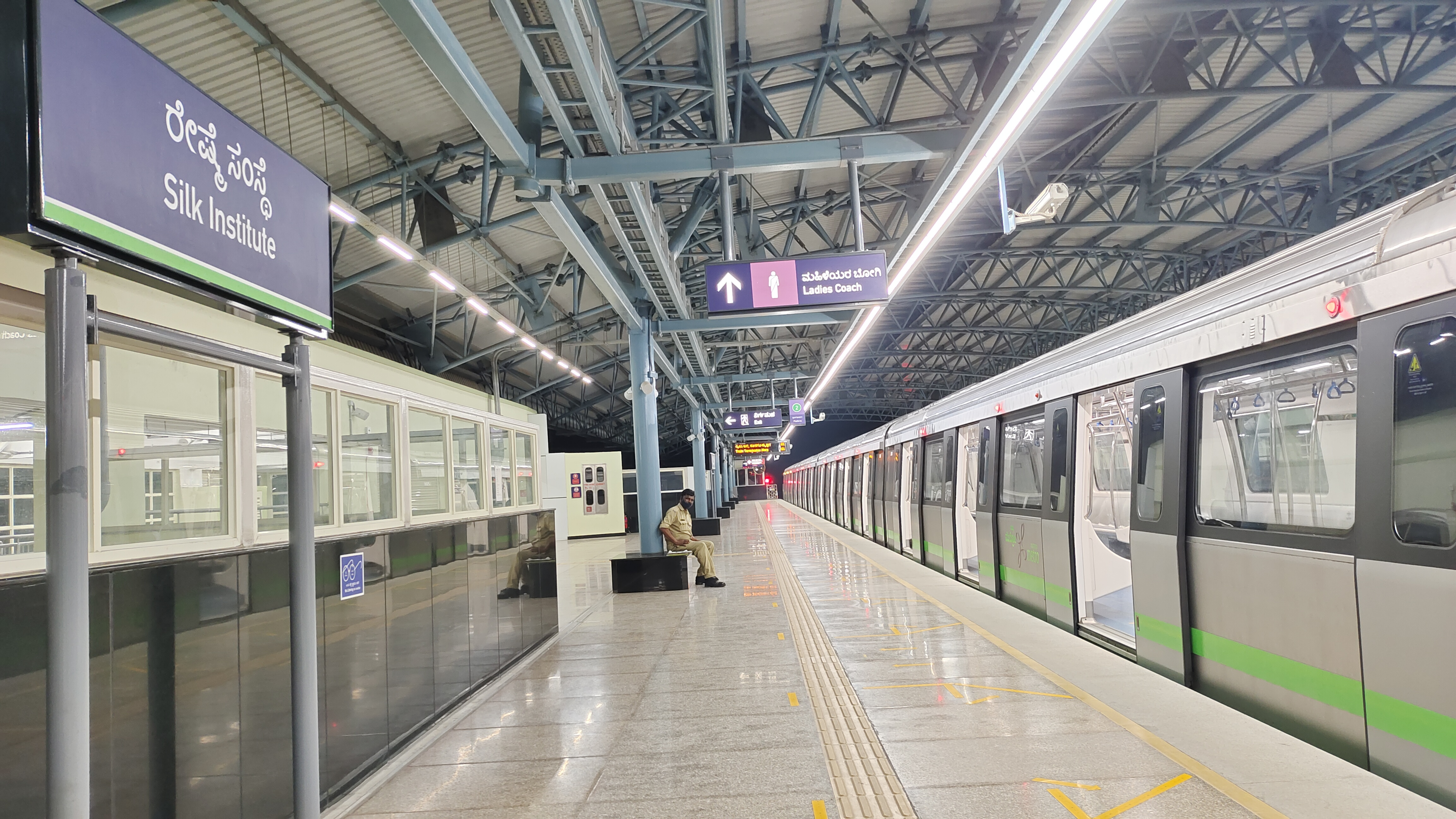
A Green Line Namma Metro train at the southern terminus waiting for departure towards Nagasandra in 2022

- Central Silk Board metro station
- List of Namma Metro stations
- Transport in Karnataka
- List of metro systems
- List of rapid transit systems in India
