= Madavara metro station =

Namma Metro's Green Line terminal metro station

Madavara
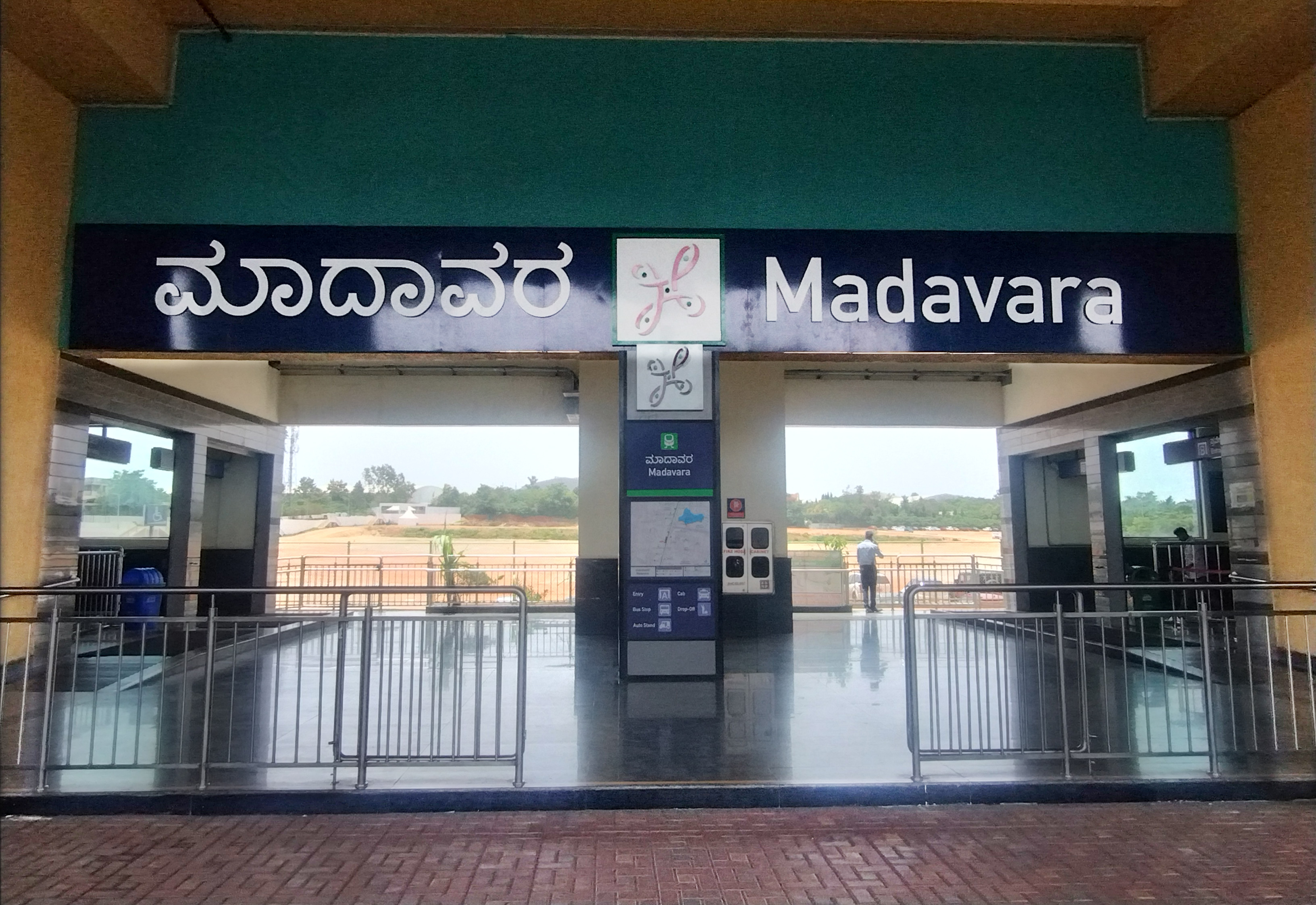
- Front entrance A of Madavara metro station in 2026

General information
- Location: Madavara, Bengaluru, Karnataka, 560073
- Coordinates: 13°03′27″N 77°28′23″E
- System: Namma Metro station
- Owner: Bangalore Metro Rail Corporation Ltd (BMRCL)
- Operator: Namma Metro
- Line: Green Line
- Platforms: Side platform Platform-1 → Train Terminates Here; Platform-2 → Silk Institute
- Tracks: 2

Construction
- Structure type: Elevated, Double track
- Platform levels: 2
- Parking: (TBC)
- Accessible: (TBC)
- Architect: Simplex Infrastructure

Other information
- Status: Operational & Staffed
- Station code: BIET

History
- Opened: 7 November 2024; 21 months ago
- Electrified: 750 V DC third rail
- Former names: BIEC

Services
Preceding station	Namma Metro	Following station
Terminus	Green Line	Chikkabidarakallu towards Silk Institute
Route map
Location

Madavara is the elevated northern terminal metro station on the North-South corridor of the Green Line of Namma Metro in Bengaluru, India. The station is located near to the Bangalore International Exhibition Centre, a prominent venue that hosts a wide range of exhibitions, events, and conferences from all over the world.

The Madavara - Nagasandra stretch's trial run was conducted on August 6 2024 and with successful trial run, this metro station was opened on November 6 2024 with the commercial run started from November 7 2024. This metro station was opened without any inauguration ceremony but will be formally inaugurated at a later stage.

== Station layout ==
G	Street level	Exit/Entrance
L1	Mezzanine	Fare control, station agent, Metro Card vending machines, crossover
L2	Side platform | Doors will open on the left
L2	Platform 2 Southbound	Towards → Silk Institute; Next Station: Chikkabidarakallu
L2	Platform 1 Northbound	Towards ← Train Terminates Here
L2	Side platform | Doors will open on the left
L2

== Gallery ==
Some of the pictures of the metro station are shown below:-

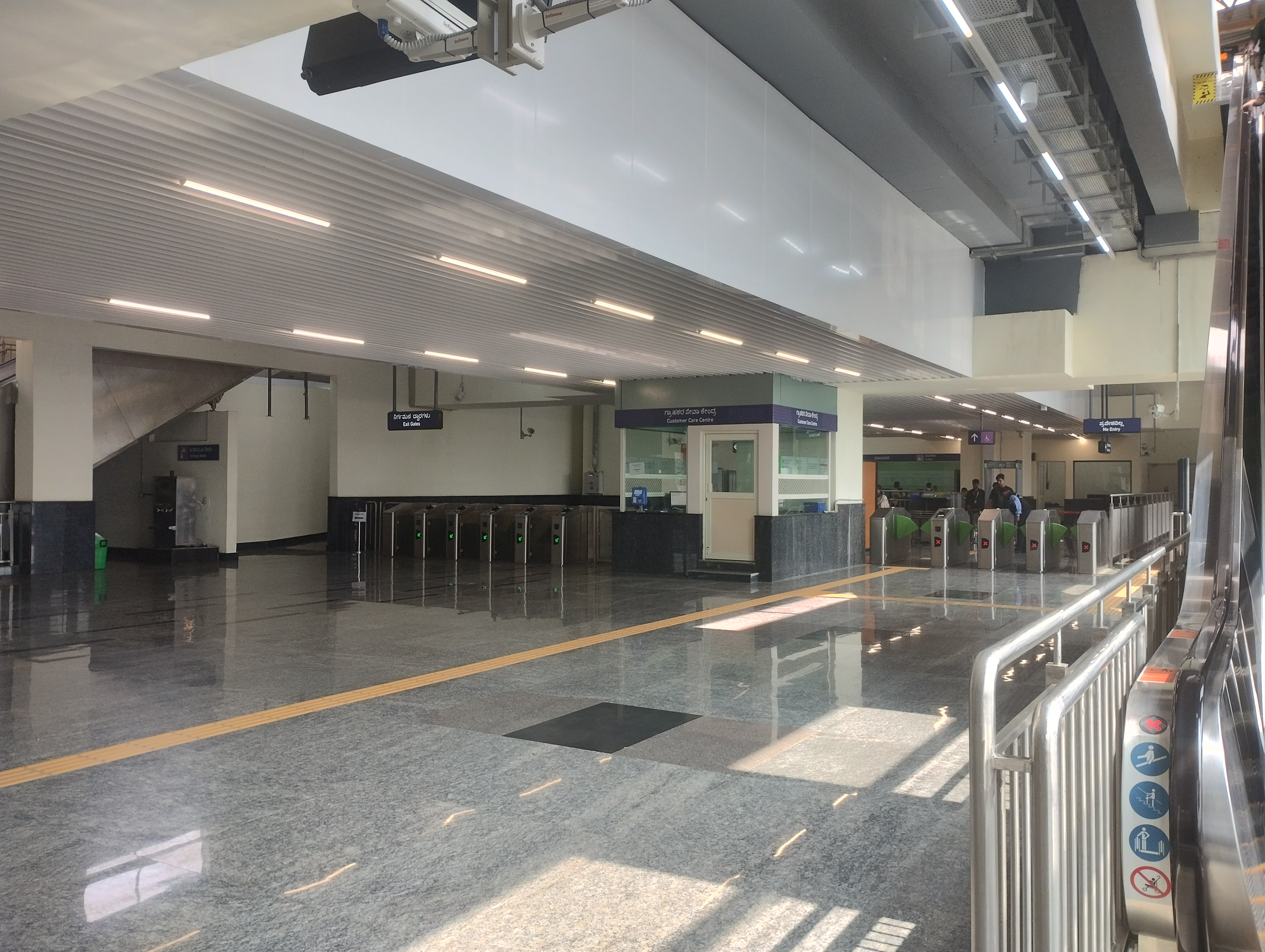
Interiors of the station

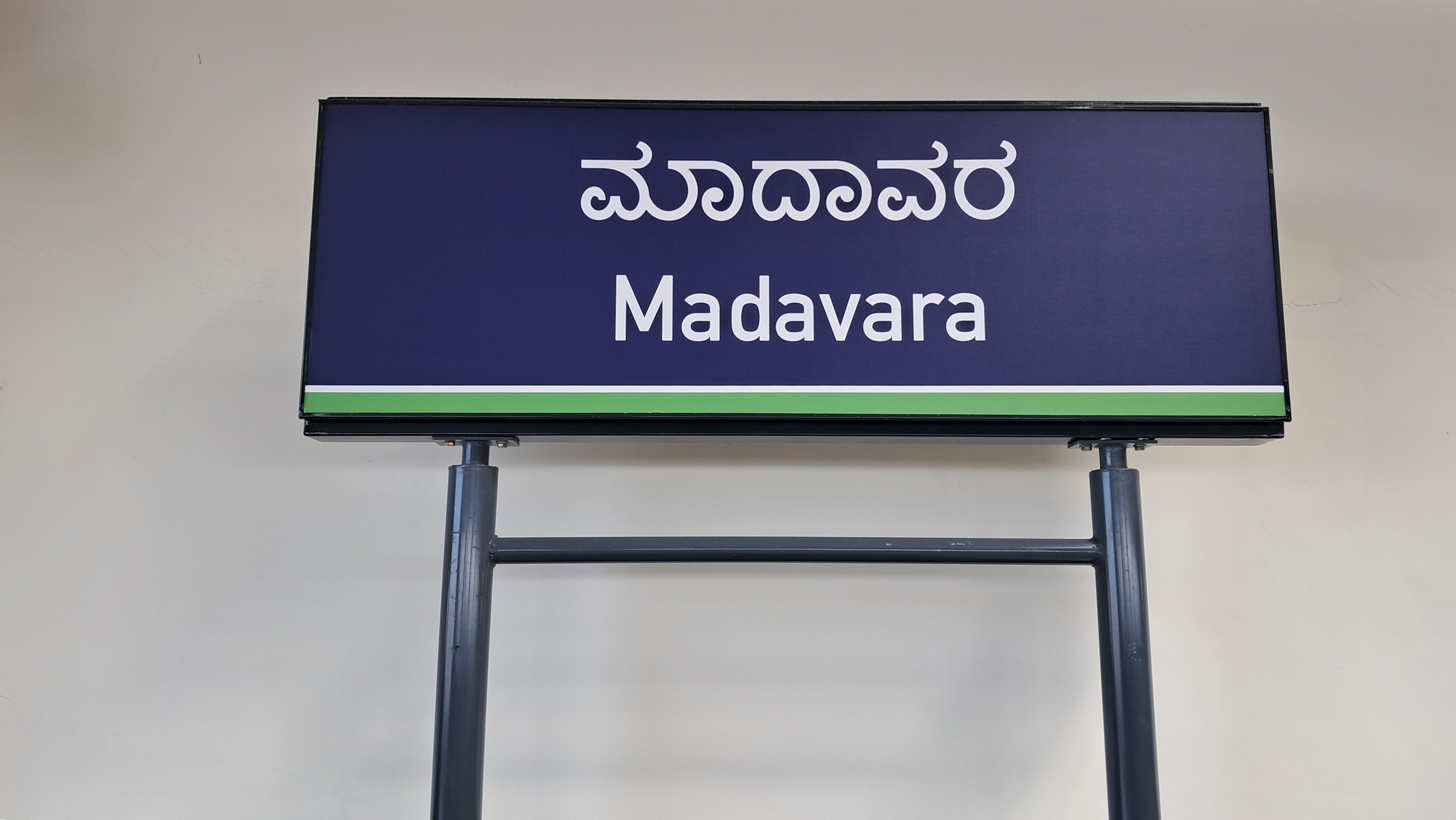
Station Board

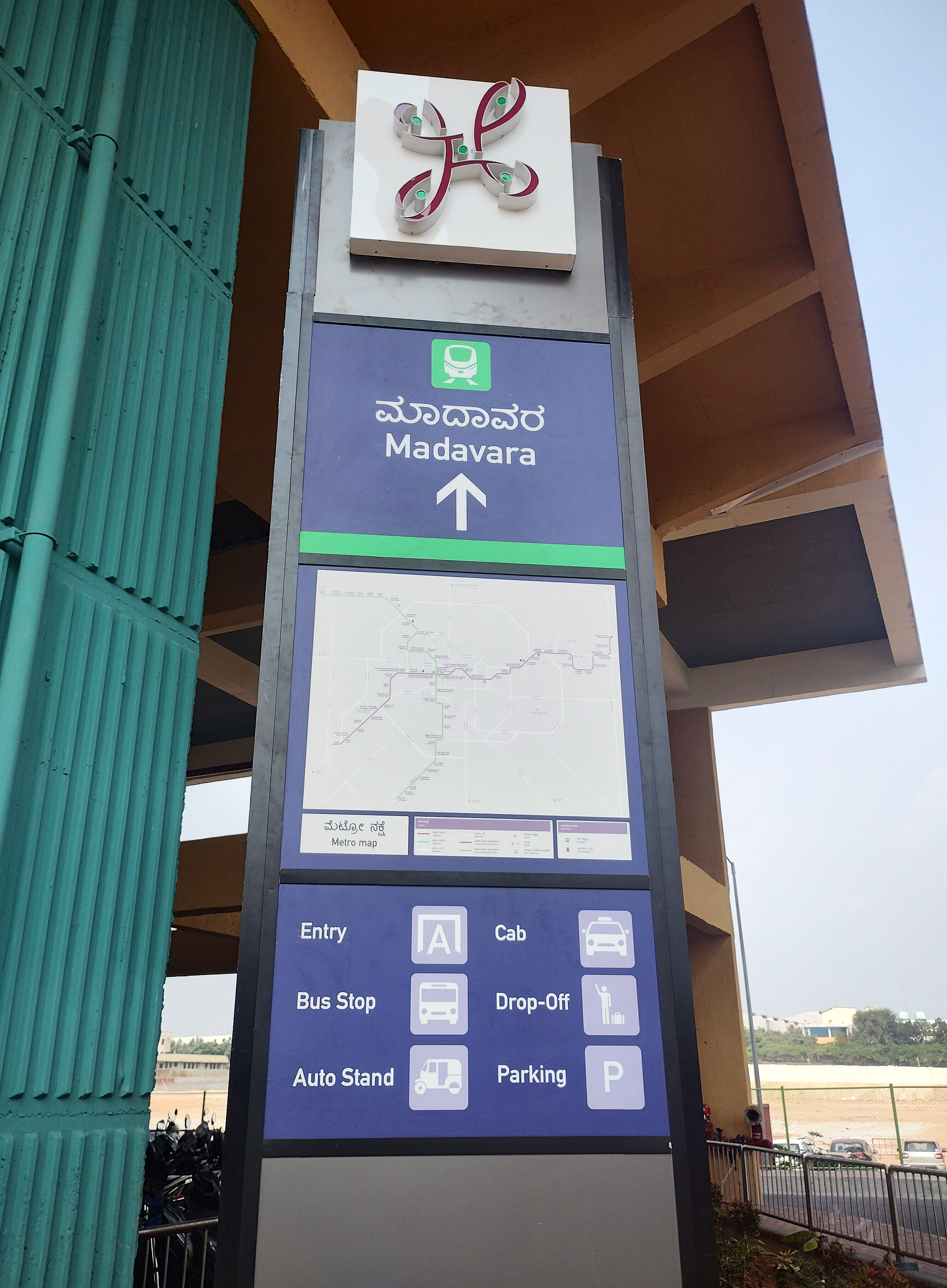
Sign Board of this metro station

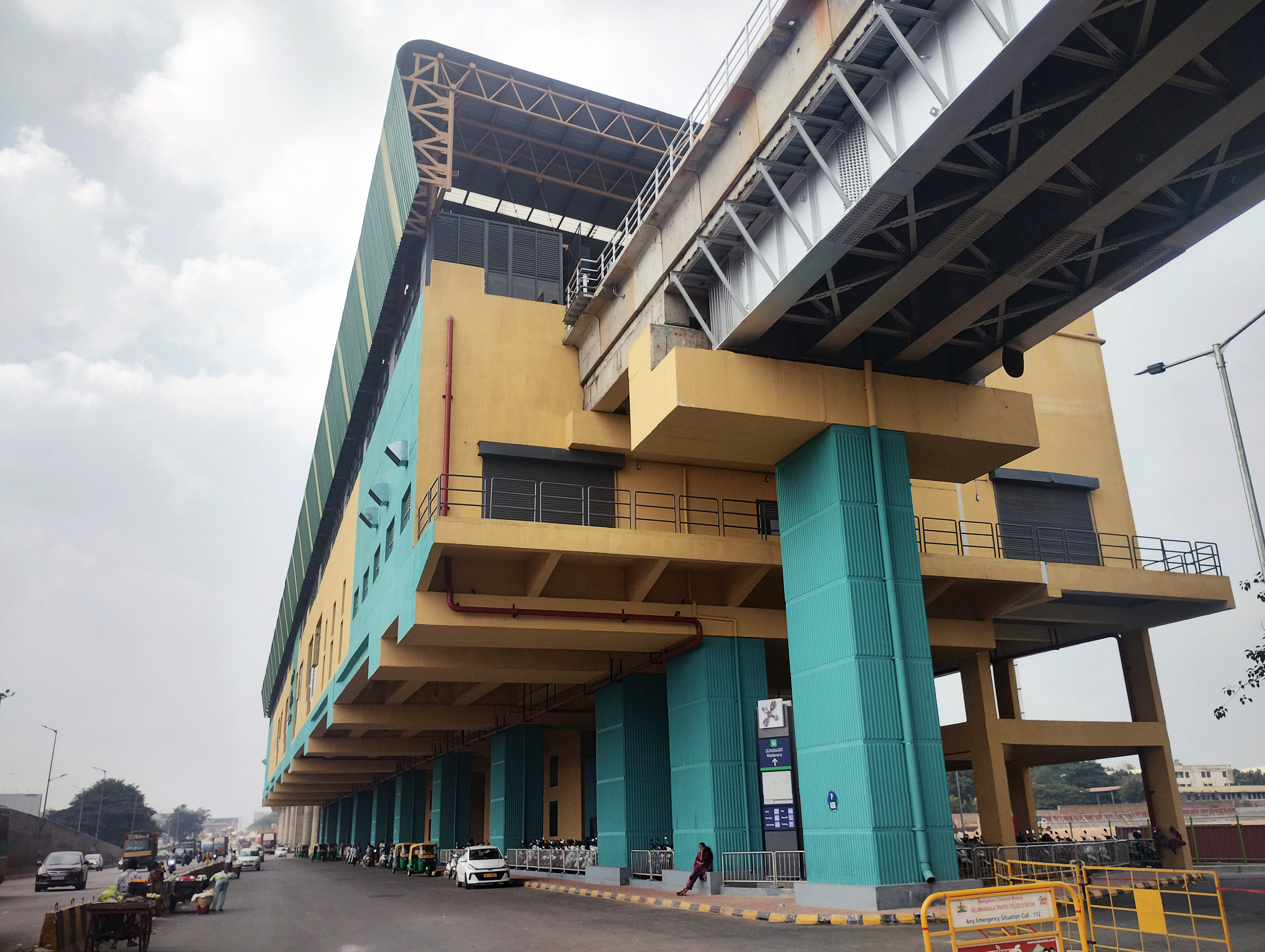
Station Building of this metro station

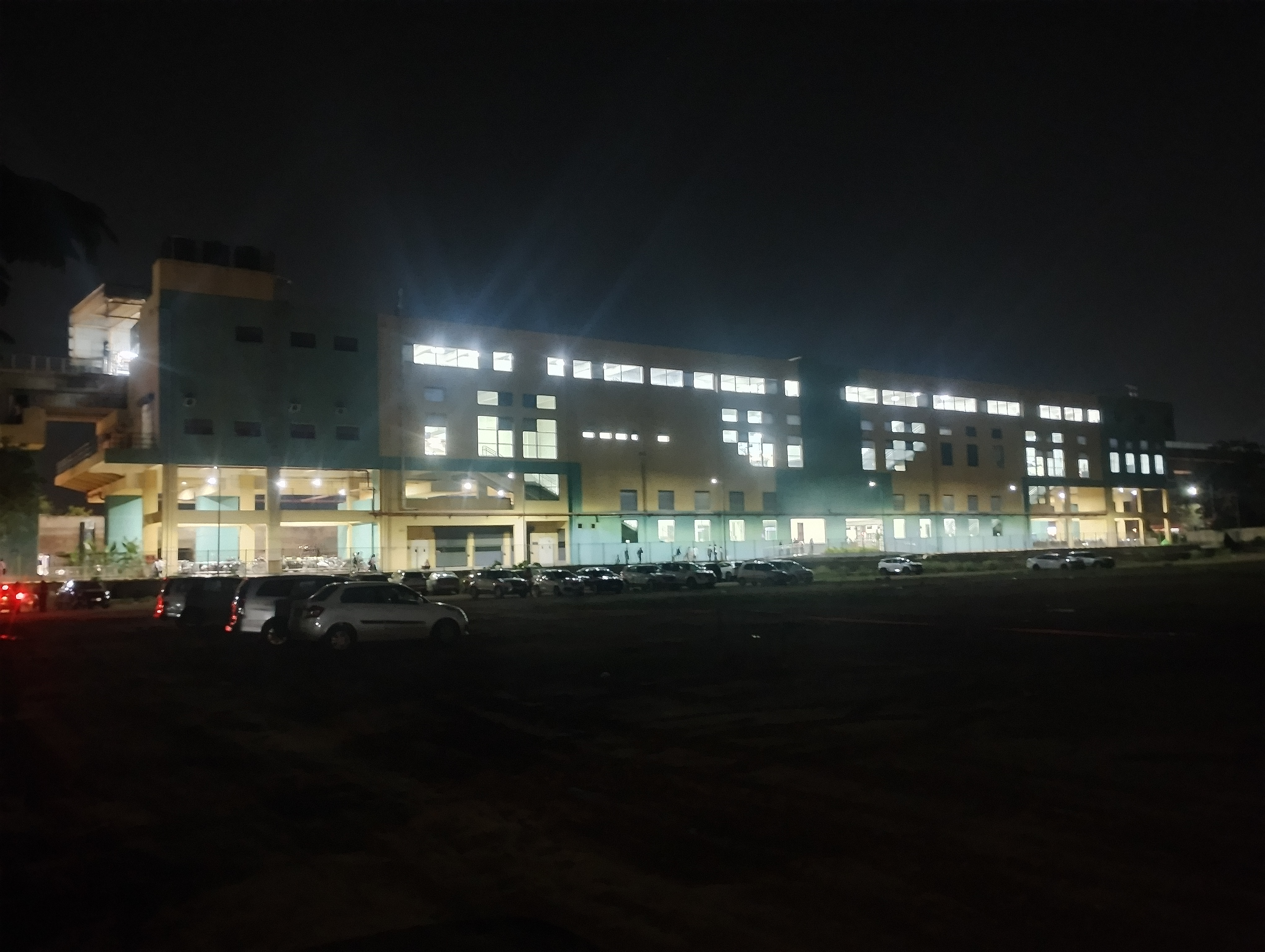
The station illuminated

== See also ==
- Bengaluru
- List of Namma Metro stations
- Transport in Karnataka
- List of metro systems
- List of rapid transit systems in India
