= Langford Town metro station =

Upcoming Namma Metro station under Pink Line

Langford Town
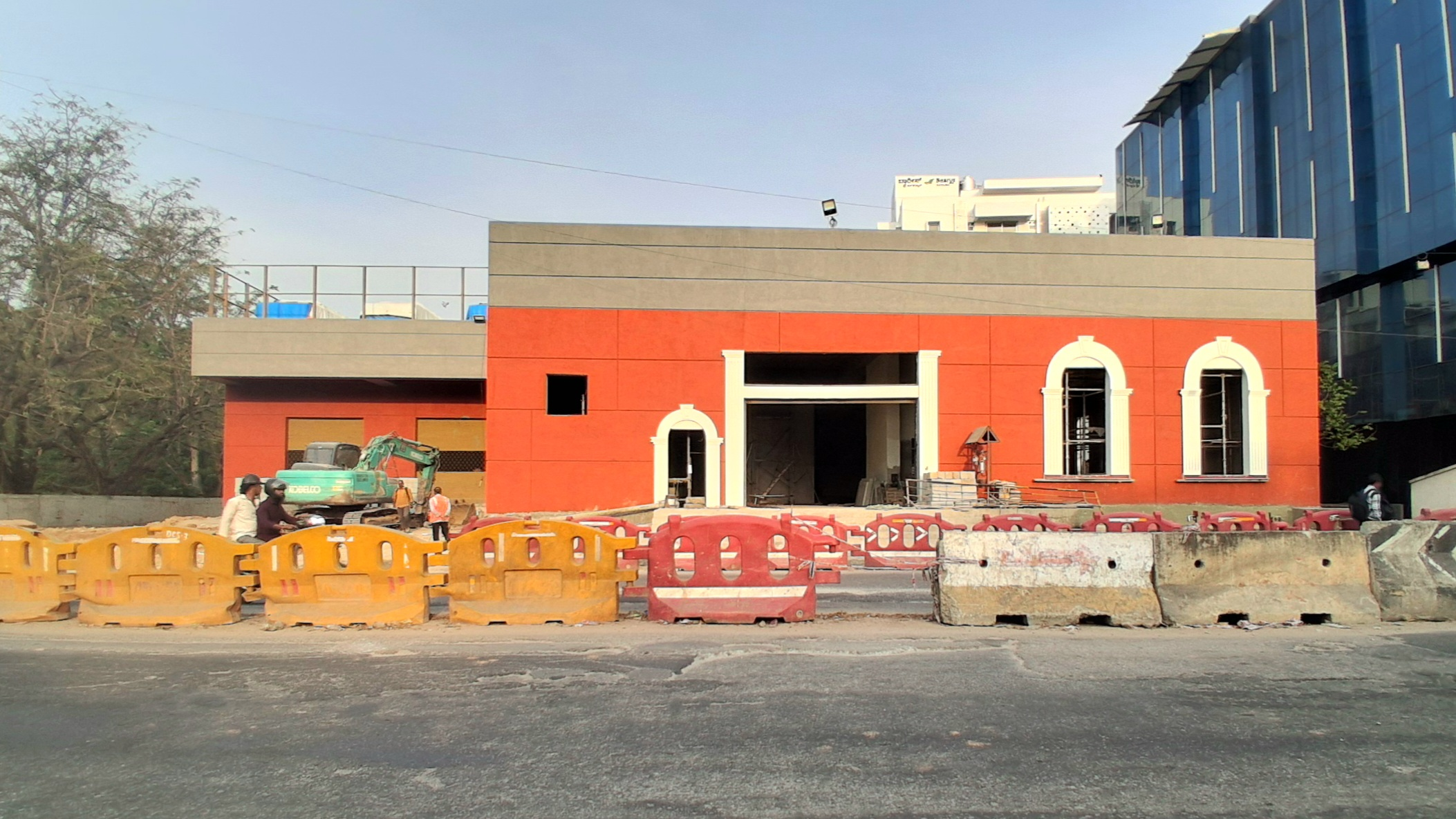
- Under Construction of this metro station under Namma Metro's Pink Line as of April 2026

General information
- Location: Hosur Road, Muniswamy Garden, Neelasandra, Bengaluru, Karnataka 560025
- Coordinates: 12.9571364°N 77.6061488°E
- System: Namma Metro station
- Owner: Bangalore Metro Rail Corporation Ltd (BMRCL)
- Operator: Namma Metro
- Line: Pink Line
- Platforms: Island platform (TBC); Platform-1 → Nagawara; Platform-2 → Kalena Agrahara; Platform Numbers (TBC)
- Tracks: 2 (TBC)

Construction
- Structure type: Underground, Double track
- Platform levels: 2 (TBC)
- Parking: (TBC)
- Accessible: (TBC)
- Architect: Afcons Infrastructure

Other information
- Status: Under Construction
- Station code: (TBC)

History
- Opening: May 2027; 6 months' time (TBC)
- Electrified: (TBC)

Services
Preceding station	Namma Metro	Following station
National Military School towards Nagawara	Pink Line (Operational around May 2027)	Lakkasandra towards Kalena Agrahara
Route map
Location

Langford Town is an upcoming underground metro station on the north–south corridor of the Pink Line of Namma Metro in Bengaluru, India. This metro station serves the Langford Town area.

As per the latest updates, this metro station, under the second phase, covering the total underground distance of 13.8 km (Dairy Circle - Nagawara) is expected to be operational around May 2027 instead of December 2026

== History ==
In June 2017, Bangalore Metro Rail Corporation Limited (BMRCL) sought bids for constructing the Dairy Circle metro station along the 3.66 km South Ramp - National Military School stretch of the 21.25 km Pink Line of Namma Metro. In November 2019, Afcons Infrastructure emerged as the lowest bidders for this stretch which aligned closely with the original estimate, thus leading to a successful award for this company. They commenced the construction of this metro station as per the agreements.

== Station layout ==
Station Layout - To Be Confirmed

G	Street level	Exit/ Entrance
L1	Mezzanine	Fare control, station agent, Ticket/token, shops
L2	Platform 2 Southbound	Towards → Kalena Agrahara; Next Station: Lakkasandra
L2	Island platform | Doors will open on the right
L2	Platform 1 Northbound	Towards ← Nagawara; Next Station: National Military School
L2

== See also ==
- Bengaluru
- List of Namma Metro stations
- Transport in Karnataka
- List of metro systems
- List of rapid transit systems in India
- Bengaluru Metropolitan Transport Corporation
