= Venkateshpura metro station =

Upcoming Namma Metro station under Pink Line

Venkateshpura
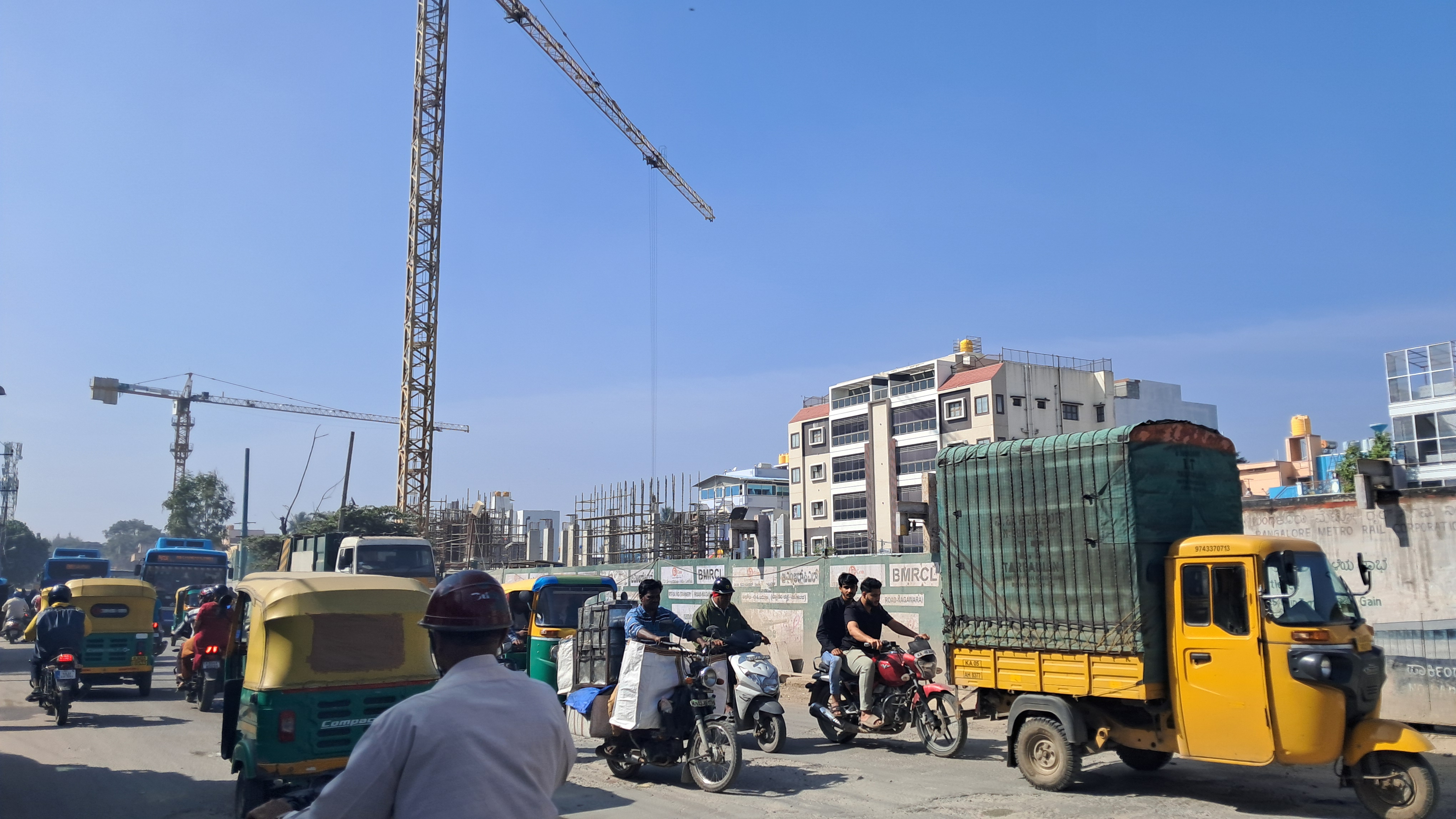
- Under Construction of this metro station under Pink Line of Namma Metro as of January 2025

General information
- Location: Kushal Nagar, Kadugondanahalli, Bengaluru, Karnataka 560045
- Coordinates: 13.01757°N 77.61789°E
- System: Namma Metro station
- Owner: Bangalore Metro Rail Corporation Ltd (BMRCL)
- Operator: Namma Metro
- Line: Pink Line
- Platforms: Island platform (TBC); Platform-1 → Nagawara; Platform-2 → Kalena Agrahara; Platform Numbers (TBC)
- Tracks: 2 (TBC)

Construction
- Structure type: Underground, Double track
- Platform levels: 2 (TBC)
- Parking: (TBC)
- Accessible: (TBC)
- Architect: ITD Cementation India Ltd.

Other information
- Status: Under Construction
- Station code: (TBC)

History
- Opening: May 2027; 6 months' time (TBC)
- Electrified: (TBC)

Services
Preceding station	Namma Metro	Following station
Kadugundanahalli towards Nagawara	Pink Line (Operational around May 2027)	Tannery Road towards Kalena Agrahara
Route map
Location

Venkateshpura is an upcoming underground metro station on the north–south corridor of the Pink Line of Namma Metro in Bengaluru, India.

As per the latest updates, this metro station, under the second phase, covering the total distance of 13.km stretch (Dairy Circle - Nagawara) is expected to be operational around May 2027 instead of December 2026

== History ==
In June 2017, Bangalore Metro Rail Corporation Limited (BMRCL) sought bids for constructing the Venkateshpura metro station along the 4.59 km Shadi Mahal Ramp - North Ramp stretch of the 21.25 km Pink Line of Namma Metro. In November 2019, ITD Cementation India emerged as the lowest bidder for this stretch which aligned closely with the original estimate, thus leading to successful award for this company. They commenced the construction of this metro station as per the agreements.

== Station Layout ==
Station Layout - To Be Confirmed

G	Street level	Exit/ Entrance
L1	Mezzanine	Fare control, station agent, Ticket/token, shops
L2	Platform 2 Southbound	Towards → Kalena Agrahara; Next Station: Tannery Road
L2	Island platform | Doors will open on the right
L2	Platform 1 Northbound	Towards ← Nagawara; Next Station: Kadugundanahalli
L2

== See also ==
- Bangalore
- List of Namma Metro stations
- Transport in Karnataka
- List of metro systems
- List of rapid transit systems in India
- Bangalore Metropolitan Transport Corporation
