= Lakkasandra metro station =

Upcoming Namma Metro station under Pink Line

Lakkasandra
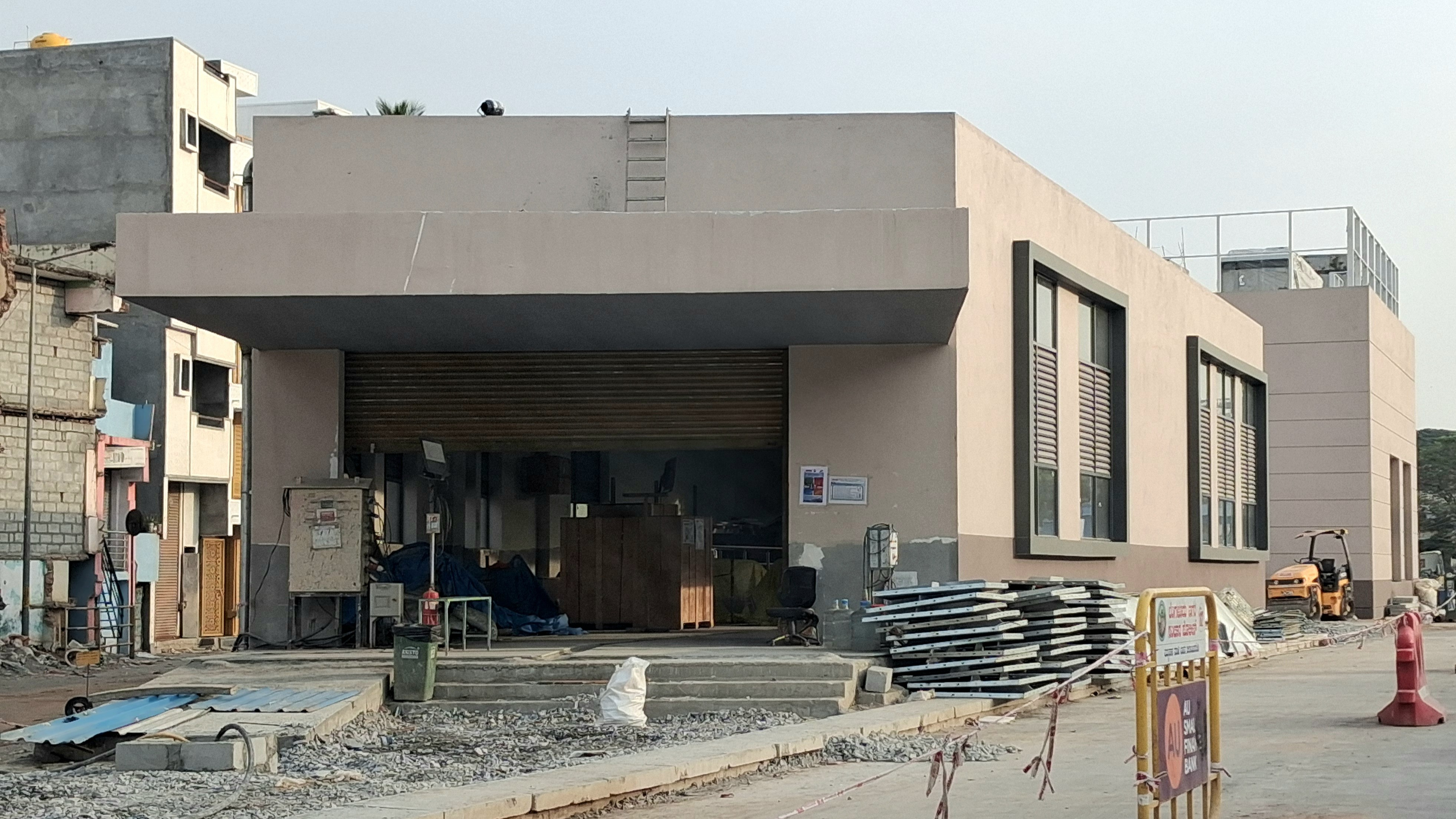
- Under Construction of this metro station under Namma Metro's Pink Line as of April 2026

General information
- Location: Bannerghatta Road, Chennakeshava Nagar, Ayappa Garden, Adugodi, Bengaluru, Karnataka 560027
- Coordinates: 12.9493354°N 77.6030797°E
- System: Namma Metro station
- Owner: Bangalore Metro Rail Corporation Ltd (BMRCL)
- Operator: Namma Metro
- Line: Pink Line
- Platforms: Island platform (TBC); Platform-1 → Nagawara; Platform-2 → Kalena Agrahara; Platform Numbers (TBC)
- Tracks: 2 (TBC)

Construction
- Structure type: Underground, Double track
- Platform levels: 2 (TBC)
- Parking: (TBC)
- Accessible: (TBC)
- Architect: Afcons Infrastructure

Other information
- Status: Under Construction
- Station code: (TBC)

History
- Opening: May 2027; 6 months' time (TBC)
- Electrified: (TBC)

Services
| Preceding station | Namma Metro | Following station |
|---|---|---|
| Langford Town towards Nagawara | Pink Line (Operational around May 2027) | Dairy Circle towards Kalena Agrahara |
Route map
Location

Lakkasandra is an upcoming underground metro station on the north–south corridor of the Pink Line of Namma Metro in Bengaluru, India. This metro station serves Lakkasandra and adjoining areas.

As per the latest updates, this metro station, under the second phase, covering the total underground distance of 13.8 km (Dairy Circle - Nagawara) is expected to be operational around May 2027 instead of December 2026

== History ==
In June 2017, Bangalore Metro Rail Corporation Limited (BMRCL) sought bids for constructing the Dairy Circle metro station along the 3.66 km South Ramp - National Military School stretch of the 21.25 km Pink Line of Namma Metro. In November 2019, Afcons Infrastructure emerged as the lowest bidders for this stretch which aligned closely with the original estimate, thus leading to a successful award for this company. They commenced the construction of this metro station as per the agreements.

== Station Layout ==
Station Layout - To Be Confirmed

| G | Street level | Exit/ Entrance |
| L1 | Mezzanine | Fare control, station agent, Ticket/token, shops |
| L2 | Platform 2 Southbound | Towards → Kalena Agrahara; Next Station: Dairy Circle; Change at the next station for Red Line |
| L2 | Island platform | Doors will open on the right |
| L2 | Platform 1 Northbound | Towards ← Nagawara; Next Station: Langford Town |
| L2 |

== See also ==
- Bengaluru
- List of Namma Metro stations
- Transport in Karnataka
- List of metro systems
- List of rapid transit systems in India
- Bengaluru Metropolitan Transport Corporation
