= Mahatma Gandhi Road metro station (Bengaluru) =

Metro station in India

Mahatma Gandhi Road
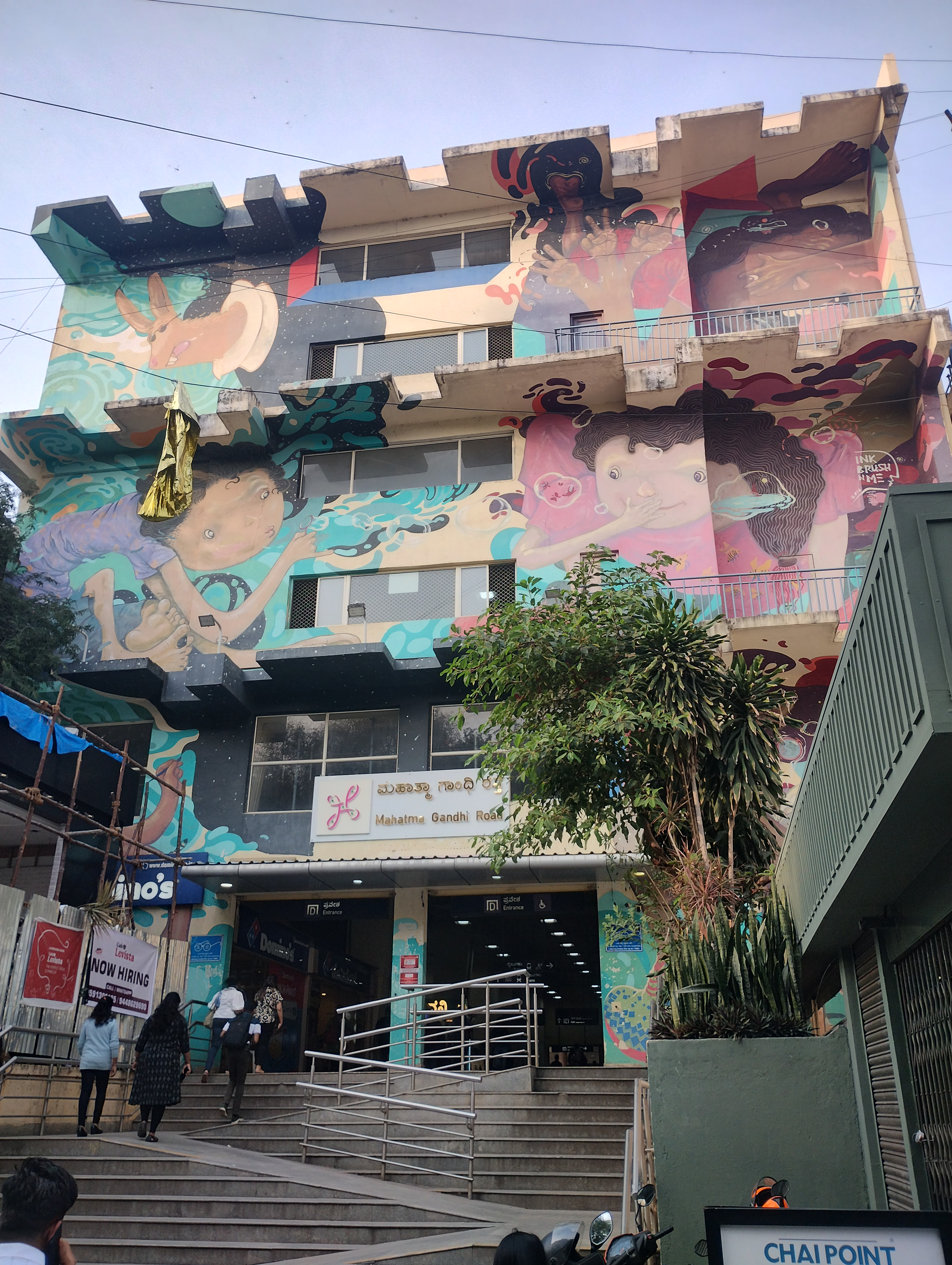
- Church Street entrance of the station, October 2024

General information
- Location: M.G. Road, Shivaji Nagar, Bengaluru, Karnataka 560001; India
- Coordinates: 12°58′32″N 77°36′25″E
- System: Namma Metro station
- Owner: Bangalore Metro Rail Corporation Ltd (BMRCL)
- Operator: Namma Metro
- Line: Purple Line Pink Line
- Platforms: Side platform Platform-1 → Whitefield (Kadugodi); Platform-2 → Challaghatta; Island platform Platform-1 → Nagawara; Platform-2 → Kalena Agrahara; Platform Numbers (TBC)
- Tracks: 2 + 2 (U/C)

Construction
- Structure type: Elevated
- Platform levels: 5 (2 Elevated + 2 UG)
- Cycle facilities: Yes
- Accessible: Yes
- Architect: Punj Lloyd - Sembawang Infrastructure (India) JV; Larsen & Toubro

Other information
- Station code: MAGR

History
- Opened: 20 October 2011; 15 years ago
- Opening: May 2027; 6 months' time (TBC)
- Electrified: 750 V DC third rail

Services
Preceding station	Namma Metro	Following station
Trinity towards Whitefield (Kadugodi)	Purple Line	Cubbon Park towards Challaghatta
Shivaji Nagar towards Tavarekere or Nagawara	Pink Line (Operational around May 2027)	National Military School towards Kalena Agrahara
Route map
Location

Mahatma Gandhi Road (commonly referred to as MG Road) is an elevated metro station on the east–west corridor of the Purple Line of Namma Metro in Bengaluru, India. Purple line station was constructed by Punj Lloyd and opened to the public on 20 October 2011. The station MG Road has a bicycle stand next to the Urban Square, from where commuters can rent cycles. This metro station will serve as Purple line's 2nd interchange station after Majestic metro station for the upcoming Pink Line, being constructed by Larsen & Toubro.

As per the latest updates, this metro station, under the second phase (Pink Line), covering the total distance of 13.8 km stretch (Dairy Circle - Nagawara) is expected to be operational around May 2027 instead of December 2026

== History ==
=== Boulevard ===
The old MG Road boulevard was demolished to build Namma Metro. The reconstruction work was contracted to Rajiv Gandhi Rural Housing Corporation and Karnataka Land Army Corporation. The deadline for completion was fixed as March 2012. However, the work was delayed when the ground was found to be unstable and had to be reinforced.

The new boulevard cost ₹50 million (US$520,000) and portions of it were inaugurated on 5 September 2012. It spreads across 850 square metres.

Further plans include a two-tier walkway with a museum, art gallery, amphitheatre and children's play area located on the ground floor. The first floor of the walkway will lead to the first floor/concourse of the metro station and both floors will be equipped with internationally designed toilets. The area where the dummy coach is parked will have ramps leading up to the boulevard.

=== Gandhi Centre ===
BMRCL plans to open an exhibition of the life of Mahatma Gandhi on one floor of the station. It was scheduled to open in 2013.

== Station layout ==
Purple Line - Station Layout

L2
L2	Side Platform | Doors will open on the left
L2	Platform 1 Eastbound	Towards → Whitefield (Kadugodi); Next Station: Trinity
L2	Platform 2 Westbound	Towards ← Challaghatta; Next Station: Cubbon Park
L2	Side Platform | Doors will open on the left
L1	Mezzanine	Fare control, station agent, Metro Card vending machines, crossover
G	Street level	Exit/Entrance

Pink Line Station Layout - To Be Confirmed

G	Street level	Exit/Entrance
M	Mezzanine	Fare control, station agent, Ticket/token, shops
P	Platform 2 Southbound	Towards → Kalena Agrahara; Next Station: National Military School
P	Island platform | Doors will open on the right
P	Platform 1 Northbound	Towards ← Nagawara; Next Station: Shivaji Nagar

== Entry/Exits ==
There are 4 Entry/Exit points - A, B, C and D. Commuters can use either of the points for their travel.

- Entry/Exit point A: Towards Kumble Circle side with
- Entry/Exit point B: Towards Kamaraj Road with.
- Entry/Exit point C: Towards Brigade Road with
- Entry/Exit point D: Towards Church Street with.

== In popular culture ==
The introduction scene of Adah Sharma in 2015 Kannada film Rana Vikrama was shot at MG Road Metro railway station.

== Facilities ==
ATM of several banks have been installed at Mahatma Gandhi Road metro station.

1. ICICI Bank
2. HDFC Bank

== See also ==
- Bangalore
- List of Namma Metro stations
- Transport in Karnataka
- List of metro systems
- List of rapid transit systems in India
- Bangalore Metropolitan Transport Corporation
