= National Military School metro station =

Upcoming Namma Metro station under Pink Line

National Military School
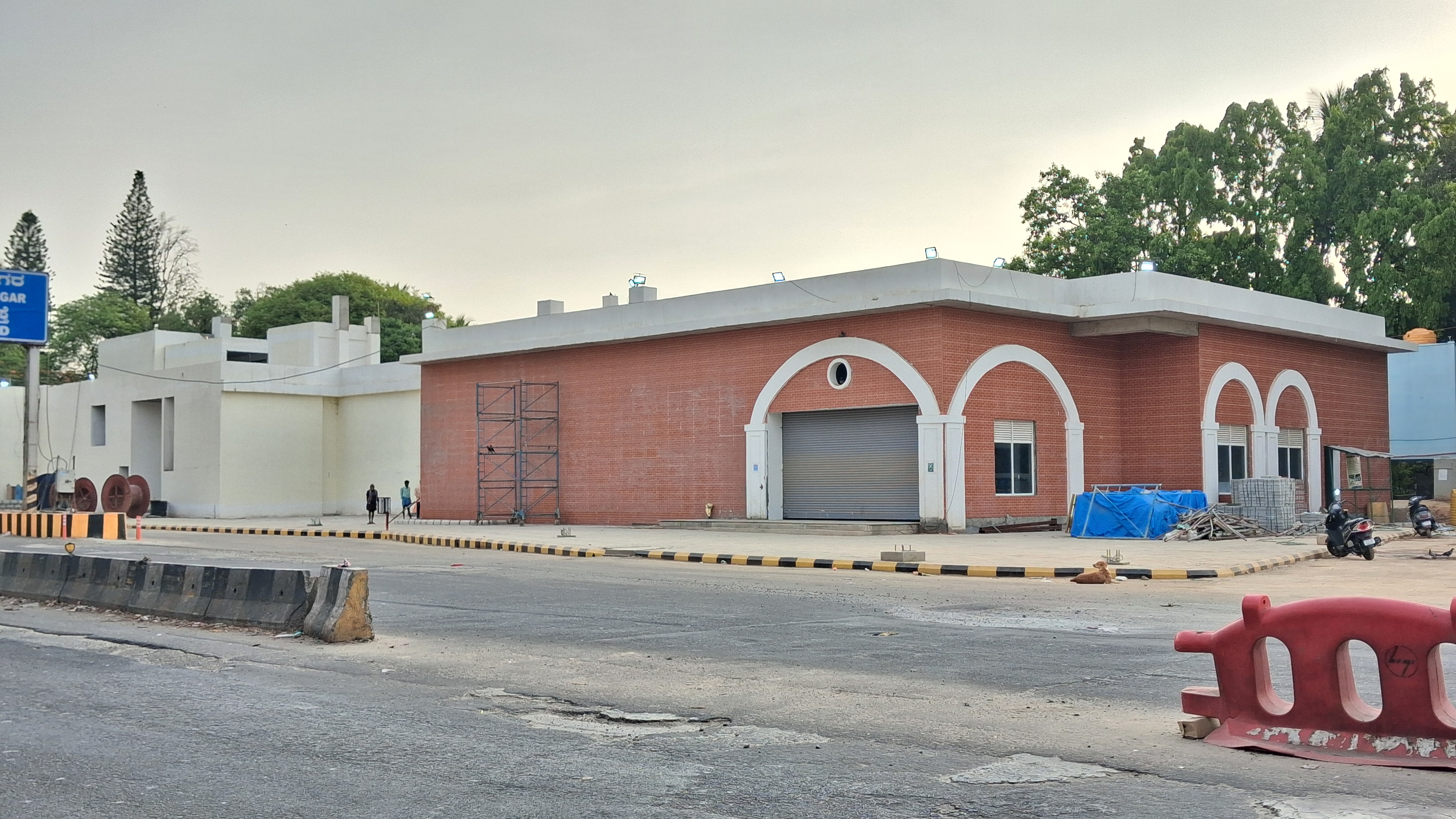
- Under Construction of this metro station under Namma Metro's Pink Line as of April 2026

General information
- Location: Hosur Rd, Muniswamy Garden, Richmond Town, Bengaluru, Karnataka 560025
- Coordinates: 12.96443°N 77.60704°E
- System: Namma Metro station
- Owner: Bangalore Metro Rail Corporation Ltd (BMRCL)
- Operator: Namma Metro
- Line: Pink Line
- Platforms: Island platform (TBC); Platform-1 → Nagawara; Platform-2 → Kalena Agrahara; Platform Numbers (TBC)
- Tracks: 2 (TBC)

Construction
- Structure type: Underground, Double track
- Platform levels: 2 (TBC)
- Parking: (TBC)
- Accessible: (TBC)
- Architect: Larsen & Toubro

Other information
- Status: Under Construction
- Station code: (TBC)

History
- Opening: May 2027; 6 months' time (TBC)
- Electrified: (TBC)

Services
Preceding station	Namma Metro	Following station
Mahatma Gandhi Road towards Nagawara	Pink Line (Operational around May 2027)	Langford Town towards Kalena Agrahara
Route map
Location

National Military School is an upcoming underground metro station on the north–south corridor of the Pink Line of Namma Metro in Bengaluru, India. This metro station consists of prime locations such as the Richmond Park, Karnataka State Hockey Association, Bengaluru Football Stadium along with other important locations like the Shoolay Circle, St Philomena Hospital, Victoria Layout, Richmond Town, Austin Town, Vivek Nagar and also connecting Bengaluru's Kanteerava Stadium to the west side and M G Road, Bangalore to the east side.

As per the latest updates, this metro station, under the second phase, covering the total underground distance of 13.8 km (Dairy Circle - Nagawara) is expected to be operational around May 2027 instead of December 2026

== History ==
In June 2017, Bangalore Metro Rail Corporation Limited (BMRCL) sought bids for constructing the Shivaji Nagar metro station along the 2.76 km National Military School - Shivaji Nagar stretch of the 21.25 km Pink Line of Namma Metro. In November 2019, Larsen & Toubro (L&T) emerged as the lowest bidders for this stretch which aligned closely with the original estimate, thus leading to a successful award for this company. They commenced the construction of this metro station as per the agreements.

== Station Layout ==
Station Layout - To Be Confirmed

G	Street level	Exit/ Entrance
M	Mezzanine	Fare control, station agent, Ticket/token, shops
P	Platform 2 Southbound	Towards → Kalena Agrahara; Next Station: Langford Town
P	Island platform | Doors will open on the right
P	Platform 1 Northbound	Towards ← Nagawara; Next Station: Mahatma Gandhi Road; Change at the next station for Purple Line
P

== See also ==
- Bengaluru
- List of Namma Metro stations
- Transport in Karnataka
- List of metro systems
- List of rapid transit systems in India
- Bengaluru Metropolitan Transport Corporation
