= Bilekahalli-I.I.M.B metro station =

Namma Metro's Pink Line metro station

Bilekahalli-I.I.M.B
- Bilekahalli-I.I.M.B metro station as of November 2026

General information
- Location: Near Fortis Hospital, Bannerghatta Road, Bilekahalli, Bengaluru, Karnataka 560076
- Coordinates: 12.8956378°N 77.5996666°E
- System: Namma Metro station
- Owner: Bengaluru Metro Rail Corporation Ltd (BMRCL)
- Operator: Namma Metro
- Line: Pink Line
- Platforms: Side platform Platform-1 → S.G. Palya (Suddagunte Palya) * Platform-2 → Kalena Agrahara * (Further extension to Nagawara in the future)
- Tracks: 2

Construction
- Structure type: Elevated, Double track
- Platform levels: 2
- Parking: (TBC)
- Accessible: Yes
- Architect: GR Infraprojects Ltd. (Simplex contract terminated in 2021)

Other information
- Status: Staffed and Operational
- Station code: (TBC)

History
- Opened: 13 November 2026; 6 days ago (Inaugural run); 14 November 2026; 5 days ago (Commercial)
- Electrified: 750 V DC third rail

Services
Preceding station	Namma Metro	Following station
N.S. Palya - JP Nagar 4th Phase towards S.G. Palya (Suddagunte Palya)	Pink Line (Partially Operational)	Hulimavu towards Kalena Agrahara
N.S. Palya - JP Nagar 4th Phase towards Nagawara	Pink Line (Operational around March 2027)	Hulimavu towards Kalena Agrahara
Route map
Location

Bilekahalli-I.I.M.B metro station (formerly known as IIMB) is an elevated metro station on the North-South corridor of the Pink Line of Namma Metro in Bengaluru, India. The station primarily serves the Indian Institute of Management Bangalore and surrounding areas, includingBilekahalli and Arekere Gate.

The station was inaugurated by Prime Minister Narendra Modi on 13 November 2026.

== History ==
In March 2017, the Bangalore Metro Rail Corporation Limited (BMRCL) sought bids for building the Bilekahalli-I.I.M.B metro station on the 7.5 km Kalena Agrahara - South Ramp section of the 21.25 km Pink Line of Namma Metro. This section comprises 5 stations, excluding Jayadeva Hospital, which was part of a joint venture between HCC - URC Constructions. Initially, Simplex Infrastructures won the tender in September 2017 but due to slow progress, their contract was terminated. In July 2021, GR Infraprojects became the lowest bidder and was awarded the Rs 364.87 Crore contract for this section. They commenced the construction of this metro station as per the agreement.

In October 2026, the Chief Minister of Karnataka, D. K. Shivakumar, acknowledged local residents' long-standing petition to rename the station from IIMB to Bilekahalli, with the justification being that the latter was the historically significant local name of the neighbourhood. The chief minister wrote to BMRCL regarding the change of name, and in the same month, it was renamed to include the name of the area.

== Station layout ==
G	Street level	Exit/Entrance
L1	Mezzanine	Fare control, station agent, Metro Card vending machines, crossover
L2	Side platform | Doors will open on the left
L2	Platform 2 Southbound	Towards → Kalena Agrahara; Next Station: Hulimavu
L2	Platform 1 Northbound	Towards ← S.G. Palya (Suddagunte Palya) ** Next Station: N.S. Palya - JP Nagar 4th Phase; Change at the next station for Orange Line
L2	Side platform | Doors will open on the left
L2	Note:	** To be further extended to Nagawara in the future

== See also ==
- Bengaluru
- List of Namma Metro stations
- Transport in Karnataka
- List of metro systems
- List of rapid transit systems in India
- Bengaluru Metropolitan Transport Corporation
