= List of Namma Metro stations =

The Namma Metro (English: Our metro), also known as Bengaluru Metro, is the rapid transit system serving the city of Bengaluru in India. Out of the operational 91 metro stations of Namma Metro as of 13 November 2026, there are 83 elevated stations, 7 underground stations and one at-grade station.

Evolution of Namma Metro

The first section (on the Purple Line) of the Namma Metro system opened on 20 October 2011 between Baiyappanahalli and M.G Road. The system is operated by the Bangalore Metro Rail Corporation Limited (BMRCL).

On 25 March 2023, a new section of the Purple Line from Krishnarajapura to Whitefield (Kadugodi) (13.71 km) with 12 new stations was inaugurated by the Prime Minister, Narendra Modi. After the inauguration, the Purple Line was complete and the Namma Metro became the second longest metro system in India (76.95 km) after Delhi Metro. Currently, it is still the second-longest metro system in India, consisting of 103.6 km of tracks after the inauguration of the Pink Line.

Each line of Namma Metro is identified by a specific colour. The system uses rolling stock of standard gauge and has a combination of elevated, underground and at-grade lines. The metro is operational from about 05:00 to 23:00 hours with trains operating at a frequency of 5 to 15 minutes. The Purple Line connects Challaghatta in the west and Whitefield (Kadugodi) in the east, while the Green Line connects Madavara in the north and Silk Institute in the south. Upon next, the Yellow line connects Rashtreeya Vidyalaya Road in the south and Delta Electronics Bommasandra in the south east, while the newly launched Pink Line connects S.G. Palya (Suddagunte Palya) and Kalena Agrahara, both down south-side. The network is currently being expanded with the addition of new lines and extensions to existing lines (see below for the complete list of stations).

== Metro Stations ==
=== Operational ===
*	Terminal station
†	Interchange station

Station name		Line	Opened	Layout	Abbreviations	Notes	Ref.
English	Kannada	Line	Opened	Layout	Abbreviations	Notes	Ref.
Attiguppe	ಅತ್ತಿಗುಪ್ಪೆ	Purple Line	16 November 2015	Elevated	AGPP	–	
Baiyappanahalli	ಬೈಯ್ಯಪ್ಪನಹಳ್ಳಿ	Purple Line	20 October 2011	At grade	BYPL	Baiyyappanahalli railway station	
Banashankari	ಬನಶಂಕರಿ	Green Line	18 June 2017	Elevated	BSNK	Banashankari TTMC	
Benniganahalli	ಬೆನ್ನಿಗಾನಹಳ್ಳಿ	Purple Line	9 October 2023	Elevated	JTPM	Also known as Tin Factory Metro. Initially titled Jyothipuram	
Beratena Agrahara	ಬೆರಟೇನ ಅಗ್ರಹಾರ	Yellow Line	10 August 2025	Elevated	HOSR	Formerly named Hosa Road. Not to be confused with the currently existing Hosa Road	
Bilekahalli IIM-B	ಬಿಳೇಕಹಳ್ಳಿ ಐಐಎಂ-ಬಿ	Pink Line	13 November 2026	Elevated	TBC	Links Indian Institute of Management Bangalore	
Biocon Hebbagodi	ಬಯೋಕಾನ್ ಹೆಬ್ಬಗೋಡಿ	Yellow Line	10 August 2025	Elevated	HBGI	Links Biocon Corporate Campus	
Bommanahalli	ಬೊಮ್ಮನಹಳ್ಳಿ	Yellow Line	10 August 2025	Elevated	HSRL	Formerly named HSR Layout. Not to be confused with the upcoming HSR Layout station	
BTM Layout	ಬಿ ಟಿ ಎಂ ಬಡಾವಣೆ	Yellow Line	10 August 2025	Elevated	BTML	–	
Central Silk Board †	ಕೇಂದ್ರ ರೇಷ್ಮೆ ಮಂಡಳಿ	Yellow Line; Blue Line	10 August 2025; Under construction	Elevated	SBJT	Links Silk Board junction towards Electronic City Elevated Expressway	
Challaghatta *	ಚಲ್ಲಘಟ್ಟ	Purple Line	9 October 2023	Elevated	CLGA	Entry to Bengaluru - Mysuru National Highway 275	
Chickpete	ಚಿಕ್ಕಪೇಟೆ	Green Line	18 June 2017	Underground	CKPE	–	
Chikkabidarakallu	ಚಿಕ್ಕಬಿದರಕಲ್ಲು	Green Line	7 November 2024	Elevated	CKBD	Also known as Jindal Station	
Cubbon Park	ಕಬ್ಬನ್ ಪಾರ್ಕ್	Purple Line	29 April 2016	Underground	CBPK	Links M. Chinnaswamy Stadium	
Dasarahalli	ದಾಸರಹಳ್ಳಿ	Green Line	1 May 2015	Elevated	DSH	–	
Deepanjali Nagar	ದೀಪಾಂಜಲಿ ನಗರ	Purple Line	16 November 2015	Elevated	DJNR	–	
Delta Electronics Bommasandra *	ಡೆಲ್ಟಾ ಎಲೆಕ್ಟ್ರಾನಿಕ್ಸ್ ಬೊಮ್ಮಸಂದ್ರ	Yellow Line	10 August 2025	Elevated	BMSD	Links Delta Electronics India Pvt. Ltd.	
Doddakallasandra	ದೊಡ್ಡಕಲ್ಲಸಂದ್ರ	Green Line	15 January 2021	Elevated	KLPK	Initially titled Krishna Leela Park	
Dr. B. R. Ambedkar Station, Vidhana Soudha	ಡಾ. ಬಿ. ಆರ್. ಅಂಬೇಡ್ಕರ್ ನಿಲ್ದಾಣ, ವಿಧಾನ ಸೌಧ	Purple Line	29 April 2016	Underground	VDSA	Links Vidhana Soudha	
Electronic City	ಎಲೆಕ್ಟ್ರಾನಿಕ್ ಸಿಟಿ	Yellow Line	10 August 2025	Elevated	ETCT	Links Konappana Agrahara	
Garudacharpalya	ಗರುಡಾಚಾರ್‍‍ಪಾಳ್ಯ	Purple Line	26 March 2023	Elevated	GDCP	–	
Goraguntepalya	ಗೊರಗುಂಟೆಪಾಳ್ಯ	Green Line	1 March 2014	Elevated	YPI	Formerly known as Yeshwanthpur Industry	
Halasuru	ಹಲಸೂರು	Purple Line	20 October 2011	Elevated	HLRU	-	
Hongasandra	ಹೊಂಗಸಂದ್ರ	Yellow Line	10 August 2025	Elevated	OFDC	Formerly titled Oxford College	
Hoodi	ಹೂಡಿ	Purple Line	26 March 2023	Elevated	DKIA	Formerly titled Doddanekundi Industrial Area	
Hopefarm Channasandra	ಹೋಪ್ ಫಾರ್ಮ್ ಚನ್ನಸಂದ್ರ	Purple Line	26 March 2023	Elevated	UWVL	Formerly titled Ujjwal Vidyalaya	
Hosa Road	ಹೊಸ ರಸ್ತೆ	Yellow Line	10 August 2025	Elevated	BSRD	Formerly named Basapura Road	
Hosahalli	ಶ್ರೀ ಬಾಲಗಂಗಾಧರನಾಥ ಸ್ವಾಮೀಜಿ ನಿಲ್ದಾಣ, ಹೊಸಹಳ್ಳಿ	Purple Line	16 November 2015	Elevated	HSLI	–	
Hulimavu	ಹುಳಿಮಾವು	Pink Line	13 November 2026	Elevated	TBC	–	
Huskur Road	ಹುಸ್ಕೂರು ರಸ್ತೆ	Yellow Line	10 August 2025	Elevated	HSKR	–	
Indira Nagar	ಇಂದಿರಾ ನಗರ	Purple Line	20 October 2011	Elevated	IDN	Also known as CMH Road	
Infosys Foundation Konappana Agrahara	ಇನ್ಫೋಸಿಸ್ ಫೌಂಡೇಷನ್ ಕೋನಪ್ಪನ ಅಗ್ರಹಾರ	Yellow Line	10 August 2025	Elevated	ECTN	Links Electronic City and IT Companies like Infosys, Wipro	
Jalahalli	ಜಾಲಹಳ್ಳಿ	Green Line	1 May 2015	Elevated	JLHL	–	
Jayadeva Hospital †	ಜಯದೇವ ಆಸ್ಪತ್ರೆ	Yellow Line; Pink Line	10 August 2025; 13 November 2026	Elevated	JDHP	Links Sri Jayadeva Institute of Cardiovascular Sciences and Research	
Jayanagar	ಜಯನಗರ	Green Line	18 June 2017	Elevated	JYN	–	
Jaya Prakash Nagar	ಜಯಪ್ರಕಾಶ ನಗರ	Green Line	18 June 2017	Elevated	JPN	Also known as Sarakki Metro	
Jnanabharathi	ಜ್ಞಾನಭಾರತಿ	Purple Line	31 August 2021	Elevated	BGUC	Initially planned to be named Bengaluru University Cross	
JP Nagar 4th Phase * †	ಜೆಪಿ ನಗರ 4ನೇ ಹಂತ	Pink Line; Orange Line	13 November 2026 Under Construction	Elevated	TBC	Links Nexus Vega City Mall	
Kadugodi Tree Park	ಕಾಡುಗೋಡಿ ಟ್ರೀ ಪಾರ್ಕ್	Purple Line	26 March 2023	Elevated	KDGD	Formerly titled Kadugodi Industrial Area. Links Kadugodi	
Kalena Agrahara *	ಕಾಳೇನ ಅಗ್ರಹಾರ	Pink Line	13 November 2026	Elevated	TBC	–	
Kengeri	ಕೆಂಗೇರಿ	Purple Line	31 August 2021	Elevated	KGIT	–	
Kengeri Bus Terminal	ಕೆಂಗೇರಿ ಬಸ್ ಟರ್ಮಿನಲ್	Purple Line	31 August 2021	Elevated	MLSD	Links Kengeri TTMC	
Konanakunte Cross	ಕೋಣನಕುಂಟೆ ಕ್ರಾಸ್	Green Line	15 January 2021	Elevated	APRC	Links Forum Mall Bengaluru South	
Krantivira Sangolli Rayanna Railway Station	ಕ್ರಾಂತಿವೀರ ಸಂಗೊಳ್ಳಿ ರಾಯಣ್ಣ ರೈಲು ನಿಲ್ದಾಣ	Purple Line	29 April 2016	Underground	SRCS	KSR Bengaluru Railway Station	
Krishna Rajendra Market	ಕೃಷ್ಣ ರಾಜೇಂದ್ರ ಮಾರುಕಟ್ಟೆ	Green Line	18 June 2017	Underground	KRMT	Links KR Market TTMC	
Krishnarajapura	ಕೃಷ್ಣರಾಜಪುರ	Purple Line; Blue Line	26 March 2023; Under construction	Elevated	KRAM	Krishnarajapuram railway station	
Kudlu Gate	ಕೂಡ್ಲು ಗೇಟ್	Yellow Line	10 August 2025	Elevated	MSRN	Previously planned under the name Muneshwara Nagar	
Kundalahalli	ಕುಂದಲಹಳ್ಳಿ	Purple Line	26 March 2023	Elevated	KDNH	Links SAP Labs	
Lalbagh	ಲಾಲ್ ಬಾಗ್	Green Line	18 June 2017	Elevated	LBGH	Links Lalbagh Botanical Garden	
Madavara *	ಮಾದಾವರ	Green Line	7 November 2024	Elevated	BIET	Formerly known as BIEC and links BIEC	
Magadi Road	ಮಾಗಡಿ ರಸ್ತೆ	Purple Line	16 November 2015	Elevated	MIRD	–	
Mahakavi Kuvempu Road	ಮಹಾಕವಿ ಕುವೆಂಪು ರಸ್ತೆ	Green Line	1 March 2014	Elevated	KVPR	–	
Mahalakshmi	ಮಹಾಲಕ್ಷ್ಮೀ	Green Line	1 March 2014	Elevated	MHLI	Links ISKCON Temple, Bengaluru	
Mahatma Gandhi Road	ಮಹಾತ್ಮಾ ಗಾಂಧಿ ರಸ್ತೆ	Purple Line; Pink Line	20 October 2011; Under construction	Elevated; Underground	MAGR	Also known as MG Road	
Manjunathanagara	ಮಂಜುನಾಥನಗರ	Green Line	7 November 2024	Elevated	MNJN	–	
Mantri Square Sampige Road	ಮಂತ್ರಿ ಸ್ಕ್ವೇರ್, ಸಂಪಿಗೆ ರಸ್ತೆ	Green Line	1 March 2014	Elevated	SPGD	Links Malleshwaram, Bengaluru	
Mysuru Road	ಮೈಸೂರು ರಸ್ತೆ	Purple Line	16 November 2015	Elevated	MYRD	–	
Nadaprabhu Kempegowda station, Majestic †	ನಾಡಪ್ರಭು ಕೆಂಪೇಗೌಡ ನಿಲ್ದಾಣ, ಮೆಜೆಸ್ಟಿಕ್	Purple Line; Green Line	29 April 2016; 18 June 2017	Underground	KGWA	KSR Bengaluru Railway Station; BMTC and KSRTC Bus Terminus	
Nagasandra	ನಾಗಸಂದ್ರ	Green Line	1 May 2015	Elevated	NGSA	Links IKEA Bengaluru	
Nallurhalli	ನಲ್ಲೂರುಹಳ್ಳಿ	Purple Line	26 March 2023	Elevated	VDHP	Initially named Vydehi Hospital	
National College	ನ್ಯಾಷನಲ್ ಕಾಲೇಜ್	Green Line	18 June 2017	Elevated	NLC	Links Basavanagudi	
Pantharapalya–Nayandahalli	ಪಂತರಪಾಳ್ಯ - ನಾಯಂಡಹಳ್ಳಿ	Purple Line	31 August 2021	Elevated	NYHM	–	
Pattanagere	ಪಟ್ಟಣಗೆರೆ	Purple Line	31 August 2021	Elevated	PATG	–	
Pattandur Agrahara	ಪಟ್ಟಂದೂರು ಅಗ್ರಹಾರ	Purple Line	26 March 2023	Elevated	ITPL	Formerly named ITPB.	
Peenya	ಪೀಣ್ಯ	Green Line	1 March 2014	Elevated	PEYA	–	
Peenya Industry	ಪೀಣ್ಯ ಇಂಡಸ್ಟ್ರಿ	Green Line	1 March 2014	Elevated	PYID	–	
Ragigudda	ರಾಗಿಗುಡ್ಡ	Yellow Line	10 August 2025	Elevated	RGDT	Links Ragigudda - Silk Board Flyover and Ragigudda Anjaneya Temple	
Rajajinagar	ರಾಜಾಜಿನಗರ	Green Line	1 March 2014	Elevated	RJNR	–	
Rajarajeshwari Nagar	ರಾಜರಾಜೇಶ್ವರಿ ನಗರ	Purple Line	31 August 2021	Elevated	RRRN	Shortened to RR Nagar	
Rashtreeya Vidyalaya Road * †	ರಾಷ್ಟ್ರೀಯ ವಿದ್ಯಾಲಯ ರಸ್ತೆ	Green Line; Yellow Line	18 June 2017; 10 August 2025	Elevated	RVR	Shortened to RV Road	
Sandal Soap Factory	ಸ್ಯಾಂಡಲ್ ಸೋಪ್ ಫ್ಯಾಕ್ಟರಿ	Green Line	1 March 2014	Elevated	SSFY	Links Mysore Sandal Soap Factory	
Seetharamapalya	ಸೀತಾರಾಮಪಾಳ್ಯ	Purple Line	26 March 2023	Elevated	VWIA	Formerly named Vishweshwaraiah Industrial Area	
S.G. Palya (Suddagunte Palya)	ಎಸ್.ಜಿ. ಪಾಳ್ಯ (ಸುದ್ದಗುಂಟೆ ಪಾಳ್ಯ)	Pink Line	13 November 2026	Elevated	TBC	Formerly titled Tavarekere	
Silk Institute *	ರೇಷ್ಮೆ ಸಂಸ್ಥೆ	Green Line	15 January 2021	Elevated	APTS	Links Nice road Kanakapura road Junction	
Singasandra	ಸಿಂಗಸಂದ್ರ	Yellow Line	10 August 2025	Elevated	CKBR	Formerly titled Chikkabegur	
Singayyanapalya	ಸಿಂಗಯ್ಯನಪಾಳ್ಯ	Purple Line	26 March 2023	Elevated	MDVP	Formerly known as Mahadevapura	
Sir M. Visveshwaraya station, Central College	ಸರ್ ಎಂ.ವಿಶ್ವೇಶ್ವರಯ್ಯ ನಿಲ್ದಾಣ, ಸೆಂಟ್ರಲ್ ಕಾಲೇಜು	Purple Line	29 April 2016	Underground	VSWA	–	
Southend Circle	ಸೌತ್ ಎಂಡ್ ಸರ್ಕಲ್	Green Line	18 June 2017	Elevated	SECE	–	
Sri Sathya Sai Hospital	ಶ್ರೀ ಸತ್ಯ ಸಾಯಿ ಆಸ್ಪತ್ರೆ	Purple Line	26 March 2023	Elevated	SSHP	Links Sri Sathya Sai Institute of Higher Learning	
Srirampura	ಶ್ರೀರಾಮ್‍ಪುರ	Green Line	1 March 2014	Elevated	SPRU	–	
Swami Vivekananda Road	ಸ್ವಾಮಿ ವಿವೇಕಾನಂದ ರಸ್ತೆ	Purple Line	20 October 2011	Elevated	SVRD	Shortened to SV Road	
Thalaghattapura	ತಲಘಟ್ಟಪುರ	Green Line	15 January 2021	Elevated	TGTP	–	
Trinity	ಟ್ರಿನಿಟಿ	Purple Line	20 October 2011	Elevated	TTY	–	
Vajarahalli	ವಾಜರಹಳ್ಳಿ	Green Line	15 January 2021	Elevated	VJRH	–	
Vijayanagar	ವಿಜಯನಗರ	Purple Line	16 November 2015	Elevated	VJN	–	
Whitefield (Kadugodi) *	ವೈಟ್ ಫೀಲ್ಡ್ (ಕಾಡುಗೋಡಿ)	Purple Line	26 March 2023	Elevated	WHTM	Also known as Kadugodi near Whitefield railway station	
Yelachenahalli	ಯಲಚೇನಹಳ್ಳಿ	Green Line	18 June 2017	Elevated	PUTH	Formerly named Puttenahalli	
Yeshwanthpur	ಯಶವಂತಪುರ	Green Line	1 March 2014	Elevated	YPM	Yesvantpur Junction railway station	

=== Under Construction ===
Station name		Line	Estimated Opening Date	Station Layout	Abbreviations	Notes	Ref.
English	Kannada	Line	Estimated Opening Date	Station Layout	Abbreviations	Notes	Ref.
Agara †	ಅಗರ	Blue Line; Red Line	December 2026	Elevated	TBC	Links Agara Lake	
Airport City	ವಿಮಾನ ನಿಲ್ದಾಣ ನಗರ	Blue Line	December 2027	At-Grade	TBC	Links Kempegowda International Airport Halt	
Bagalur Cross	ಬಾಗಲೂರು ಕ್ರಾಸ್	Blue Line	December 2027	Elevated	TBC	Links Bagalur, Bengaluru Urban district	
DRDO Sports Complex	ಬಾಗ್ಮನೆ ಡೆವಲಪರ್ಸ್ - ರ.ಸಂ.ಅ.ಸಂ. ಕ್ರೀಡಾ ಸಂಕೀರ್ಣ	Blue Line	December 2026	Elevated	TBC	Links Bagmane World Technology Center	
Cantonment Railway Station	ದಂಡು ರೈಲ್ವೇ ನಿಲ್ದಾಣ	Pink Line	March 2027	Underground	TBC	Links Bengaluru Cantonment	
Dairy Circle †	ಡೈರಿ ವೃತ್ತ	Pink Line; Red Line	March 2027	Underground	TBC	Links Dairy Circle Flyover	
Doddajala	ದೊಡ್ಡಜಾಲ	Blue Line	December 2027	Elevated	TBC	Links NH 44 running towards Hyderabad, Delhi or Madurai, Kanyakumari	
Doddanekundi	ದೊಡ್ಡನೆಕ್ಕುಂದಿ	Blue Line	December 2026	Elevated	TBC	Links Rainbow Children's Hospital	
Kadubeesanahalli	ಎಂಬೆಸ್ಸಿ ಟೆಕ್ ವಿಲೇಜ್ ದೇವರಬೀಸನಹಳ್ಳಿ	Blue Line	December 2026	Elevated	TBC	Links Embassy TechVillage	
HBR Layout	ಎಚ್‌ ಬಿ ಆರ್ ಬಡಾವಣೆ	Blue Line	December 2027	Elevated	TBC	–	
Hebbala * †	ಹೆಬ್ಬಾಳ	Blue Line; Red Line; Orange Line	December 2027	Elevated	TBC	Links Hebbal Bus Depot, Hebbal Railway Station, Hebbal Flyover and Hebbal Lake, Bengaluru	
Horamavu	ಹೊರಮಾವು	Blue Line	December 2027	Elevated	TBC	–	
HRBR Layout	ಎಚ್‌ ಆರ್‌ ಬಿ ಆರ್ ಬಡಾವಣೆ	Blue Line	December 2027	Elevated	TBC	Links Kalyan Nagar	
HSR Layout	ಎಚ್‌ ಎಸ್‌ ಆರ್ ಬಡಾವಣೆ	Blue Line	December 2026	Elevated	TBC	–	
Ibbaluru †	ಇಬ್ಬಲೂರು	Blue Line; Red Line	December 2026	Elevated	TBC	–	
ISRO	ಇಸ್ರೋ	Blue Line	December 2026	Elevated	TBC	–	
Jakkur Cross	ಜಕ್ಕೂರು ಕ್ರಾಸ್	Blue Line	December 2027	Elevated	TBC	–	
Kadugundanahalli	ಕಾಡುಗುಂಡನಹಳ್ಳಿ	Pink Line	March 2027	Underground	TBC	–	
Kalyan Nagar	ಕಲ್ಯಾಣ ನಗರ	Blue Line	December 2027	Elevated	TBC	Links Kalyan Nagar Bus Depot	
Kasturinagara	ಕಸ್ತೂರಿ ನಗರ	Blue Line	December 2027	Elevated	TBC	–	
Kempapura * †	ಕೆಂಪಾಪುರ	Blue Line; Orange Line	December 2027	Elevated	TBC	–	
KIAL Terminals *	ಕೆಂಪೇಗೌಡ ಅಂತಾರಾಷ್ಟ್ರೀಯ ವಿಮಾನ ನಿಲ್ದಾಣ	Blue Line	December 2027	Underground	TBC	Links Kempegowda International Airport	
Kodibeesanahalli	ಕೋಡಿಬೀಸನಹಳ್ಳಿ	Blue Line	December 2026	Elevated	TBC	–	
Kodigehalli	ಕೊಡಿಗೇಹಳ್ಳಿ	Blue Line	December 2027	Elevated	TBC	–	
Lakkasandra	ಲಕ್ಕಸಂದ್ರ	Pink Line	March 2027	Underground	TBC	–	
Langford Town	ಲ್ಯಾಂಗ್ಫೋರ್ಡ್ ಟೌನ್	Pink Line	March 2027	Underground	TBC	–	
Marathahalli	ಮಾರತಹಳ್ಳಿ	Blue Line	December 2027	Elevated	TBC	–	
Nagawara * †	ನಾಗವಾರ	Pink Line; Blue Line	March 2027	Underground	TBC	Links Nagawara Junction	
National Military School	ರಾಷ್ಟ್ರೀಯ ಸೈನಿಕ ಶಾಲೆ	Pink Line	March 2027	Underground	TBC	–	
Pottery Town	ಪಾಟರಿ ಟೌನ್	Pink Line	March 2027	Underground	TBC	–	
Bellandur	ಪ್ರೆಸ್ಟೀಜ್ ಬೆಳ್ಳಂದೂರು	Blue Line	December 2026	Elevated	TBC	Links Global Technology Park	
Sarasvathi Nagara	ಸರಸ್ವತಿ ನಗರ	Blue Line	December 2026	Elevated	TBC	–	
Shivaji Nagar	ಶಿವಾಜಿನಗರ	Pink Line	March 2027	Underground	TBC	Links Shivajinagar Bus Depot	
Tannery Road	ಟ್ಯಾನರಿ ರಸ್ತೆ	Pink Line	March 2027	Underground	TBC	–	
Veerannapalya	ವೀರಣ್ಣಪಾಳ್ಯ	Blue Line	December 2027	Elevated	TBC	Links Manyata Embassy Business Park	
Venkateshpura	ವೆಂಕಟೇಶಪುರ	Pink Line	March 2027	Underground	TBC	–	
Yelahanka	ಯಲಹಂಕ	Blue Line	December 2027	Elevated	TBC	Links Yelahanka Bus Depot	

=== Proposed ===
	Station Name		Line	Opening	Layout	Abbreviations	Ref
	English	Kannada	Line	Opening	Layout	Abbreviations	Ref
1	Ambedkar Nagar	ಅಂಬೇಡ್ಕರ್ ನಗರ	Red Line	April 2033	Elevated	TBC	
2	Basaveshwara Circle	ಬಸವೇಶ್ವರ ವೃತ್ತ	Red Line	April 2033	Underground	TBC	
3	BEL Circle	ಬಿಇಎಲ್ ವೃತ್ತ	Orange Line	2031	Elevated	TBC	
4	Bellandur Gate	ಬೆಳ್ಳಂದೂರು ಗೇಟ್	Red Line	April 2033	Elevated	TBC	
5	Bengaluru Golf Course	ಬೆಂಗಳೂರು ಗಾಲ್ಫ್ ಕೋರ್ಸ್	Red Line	April 2033	Underground	TBC	
6	Byadarahalli	ಬ್ಯಾಡರಹಳ್ಳಿ	Grey Line	2029	Elevated	TBC	
7	Carmelaram	ಕಾರ್ಮೆಲಾರಂ	Red Line	April 2033	Elevated	TBC	
8	Doddakannelli	ದೊಡ್ಡಕನ್ನೆಲ್ಲಿ	Red Line	April 2033	Elevated	TBC	
9	Dommasandra	ದೊಮ್ಮಸಂದ್ರ	Red Line	April 2033	Elevated	TBC	
10	Dwaraka Nagar	ದ್ವಾರಕಾ ನಗರ	Orange Line	2031	Elevated	TBC	
11	Freedom Fighters Colony	ಸ್ವಾತಂತ್ರ್ಯ ಹೋರಾಟಗಾರರ ಕಾಲೋನಿ	Orange Line	2031	Elevated	TBC	
12	Ganganagar	ಗಂಗಾನಗರ	Red Line	April 2033	Elevated	TBC	
13	Herohalli	ಹೇರೋಹಳ್ಳಿ	Grey Line	2029	Elevated	TBC	
14	Hosakerehalli	ಹೊಸಕೆರೆಹಳ್ಳಿ	Orange Line	2031	Elevated	TBC	
15	Jakkasandra	ಜಕ್ಕಸಂದ್ರ	Red Line	April 2033	Elevated	TBC	
16	Jayaprakash Nagar 5th Phase	ಜಯಪ್ರಕಾಶ ನಗರ 5ನೇ ಹಂತ	Orange Line	2031	Elevated	TBC	
17	Kada Agrahara Road	ಕಡ ಅಗ್ರಹಾರ ರಸ್ತೆ	Red Line	April 2033	Elevated	TBC	
18	Kadabagere	ಕಡಬಗೆರೆ	Grey Line	2029	Elevated	TBC	
19	Kadirenahalli	ಕದಿರೇನಹಳ್ಳಿ	Orange Line	2031	Elevated	TBC	
20	Kaikondrahalli	ಕೈಕೊಂಡ್ರಹಳ್ಳಿ	Red Line	April 2033	Elevated	TBC	
21	Kamakshipalya	ಕಾಮಾಕ್ಷಿಪಾಳ್ಯ	Grey Line	2029	Elevated	TBC	
22	Kamakhya Bus Depot	ಕಾಮಾಖ್ಯ ಬಸ್ ಡಿಪೋ	Orange Line	2031	Elevated	TBC	
23	Kamath Layout	ಕಾಮತ್ ಲೇಔಟ್	Grey Line	2029	Elevated	TBC	
24	Kanteerava Nagar	ಕಂಠೀರವ ನಗರ	Orange Line	2031	Elevated	TBC	
25	KHB Colony	ಕೆಹೆಚ್‌ಬಿ ಕಾಲೋನಿ	Grey Line	2029	Elevated	TBC	
26	Koramangala 2nd Block	ಕೋರಮಂಗಲ 2ನೇ ಬ್ಲಾಕ್	Red Line	April 2033	Underground	TBC	
27	Koramangala 3rd Block	ಕೋರಮಂಗಲ 3ನೇ ಬ್ಲಾಕ್	Red Line	April 2033	Elevated	TBC	
28	Mekhri Circle	ಮೇಖ್ರಿ ವೃತ್ತ	Red Line	April 2033	Underground	TBC	
29	Muthanallur Cross	ಮುತ್ತನಲ್ಲೂರು ಕ್ರಾಸ್	Red Line	April 2033	Elevated	TBC	
30	Muthyalanagar	ಮುತ್ಯಾಲನಗರ	Orange Line	2031	Elevated	TBC	
31	Nagarbhavi Circle	ನಾಗರಭಾವಿ ವೃತ್ತ	Orange Line	2031	Elevated	TBC	
32	Nagarbhavi BDA Complex	ನಾಗರಭಾವಿ ಬಿಡಿಎ ಕಾಂಪ್ಲೆಕ್ಸ್	Orange Line	2031	Elevated	TBC	
33	Nagashettyhalli	ನಾಗಶೆಟ್ಟಿಹಳ್ಳಿ	Orange Line	2031	Elevated	TBC	
34	NIMHANS	ನಿಮ್ಹಾನ್ಸ್	Red Line	April 2033	Underground	TBC	
35	Palace Guttahalli	ಪ್ಯಾಲೇಸ್ ಗುಟ್ಟಹಳ್ಳಿ	Red Line	April 2033	Underground	TBC	
36	Papareddy Palya	ಪಾಪರೆಡ್ಡಿ ಪಾಳ್ಯ	Orange Line	2031	Elevated	TBC	
37	Prem Nagar	ಪ್ರೇಮ್ ನಗರ	Orange Line	2031	Elevated	TBC	
38	Sarjapur	ಸರ್ಜಾಪುರ	Red Line	April 2033	Elevated	TBC	
39	Sarjapur Terminal Station	ಸರ್ಜಾಪುರ ಟರ್ಮಿನಲ್ ನಿಲ್ದಾಣ	Red Line	April 2033	Elevated	TBC	
40	Shantinagar	ಶಾಂತಿನಗರ	Red Line	April 2033	Underground	TBC	
41	Sompura	ಸೋಂಪುರ	Red Line	April 2033	Elevated	TBC	
42	Sumanahalli Cross	ಸುಮನಹಳ್ಳಿ ಕ್ರಾಸ್	Orange LineGrey Line	2031	Elevated	TBC	
43	Sunkadakatte	ಸುಂಕದಕಟ್ಟೆ	Grey Line	2029	Elevated	TBC	
44	Town Hall	ಟೌನ್ ಹಾಲ್	Red Line	April 2033	Underground	TBC	
45	Vinayaka Layout	ವಿನಾಯಕ ಲೇಔಟ್	Orange Line	2031	Elevated	TBC	

== Statistics ==
Total number of metro stations	172
Number of elevated stations	145
Number of underground stations	25
Number of stations at-grade	2
Number of operational stations	83
Number of under construction stations	89

== Complete list of stations ==
The list below includes operational, under-construction, and proposed stations.

**Purple Line**	**Whitefield (Kadugodi)** . **Hopefarm Channasandra** . **Kadugodi Tree Park** . **Pattandur Agrahara** . **Sri Sathya Sai Hospital** . **Nallurhalli** . **Kundalahalli**. **Seetharamapalya** . **Hoodi** . **Garudacharpalya** . **Singayyanapalya**. **Krishnarajapura** ■. **Benniganahalli** . **Baiyappanahalli** . **Swami Vivekananda Road** . **Indiranagar** . **Halasuru** . **Trinity** . **Mahatma Gandhi Road** ■ . **Cubbon Park** . **Vidhana Soudha** . **Sir M. Visveshwaraya** . **Nadaprabhu Kempegowda Stn., Majestic** ■ . **Krantiveera Sangolli Rayanna Railway Station** . **Magadi Road** . **Sri Balagangadharanatha Swamiji Stn., Hosahalli** ■ . **Vijayanagar** . **Attiguppe** . **Deepanjali Nagar** . **Mysuru Road** ■ . **Pantharapalya - Nayandahalli . Rajarajeshwari Nagar . Jnanabharathi . Pattanagere . Kengeri Bus Terminal** . **Kengeri** . **Challaghatta**
**Green Line**	**Madavara** . **Chikkabidarakallu** . **Manjunath Nagar** . **Nagasandra** . **Dasarahalli** . **Jalahalli** . **Peenya Industry** . **Peenya** ■ . **Goraguntepalya** . **Yeshwanthpur** . **Sandal Soap Factory** . **Mahalakshmi** . **Rajajinagar** . **Kuvempu Road** . **Srirampura** . **Mantri Square Sampige Road** . **Nadaprabhu Kempegowda Stn., Majestic** ■ . **Chickpete** . **Krishna Rajendra Market** . **National College** . **Lalbagh** . **South End Circle** . **Jayanagar** . **Rashtreeya Vidyalaya Road** ■ . **Banashankari** . **Jaya Prakash Nagar** ■ . **Yelachenahalli** . **Konankunte Cross** . **Doddakallasandra** . **Vajarahalli** . **Thalaghattapura** . **Silk Institute**
**Yellow Line**	**Rashtreeya Vidyalaya Road** **■ . Ragigudda . Jayadeva Hospital ■ . BTM Layout . Central Silk Board ■ . Bommanahalli . Hongasandra. Kudlu Gate. Singasandra. Hosa Road . Beratena Agrahara . Electronic City. Infosys Foundation Konappana Agrahara. Huskur Road . Biocon Hebbagodi . Delta Electronics Bommasandra**
**Pink Line**	Kalena Agrahara . Hulimavu . IIMB . JP Nagar 4th Phase ■ . **Jayadeva Hospital** ■ . Suddagunte Palya. Dairy Circle . Lakkasandra . Langford Town . National Military School . **Mahatma Gandhi Road** ■ . Shivajinagar . Cantonment Railway Station . Pottery Town . Tannery Road . Venkateshpura . Kadugundanahalli . Nagawara ■
**Blue Line**	**Central Silk Board ■** . HSR Layout . Agara . Ibbaluru . Bellandur . Kadubeesanahalli . Kodibeesanahalli . Marathahalli . ISRO . Doddanekundi . Bagmane Developers - DRDO Sports Complex . Saraswathi Nagar . **Krishnarajapura** ■ . Kasturinagara . Horamavu . HRBR Layout . Kalyan Nagar . HBR Layout . Nagawara ■ . Veerannapalya . Kempapura ■ . Hebbala ■ ■. Kodigehalli. Jakkur Cross. Yelahanka . Bagalur Cross . Bettahalasuru . Doddajala . Airport City . KIAL Terminals
**Orange Line**** **Grey Line****	**ORR-West Line — JP Nagar 4th Phase** ■ . JP Nagar 5th Phase . **Jaya Prakash Nagar** ■ . Kadirenahalli . Kamakya Bus Depot . Hosakerehalli . Dwaraka Nagar . **Mysuru Road** ■ . Nagarabhavi Circle . Vinayaka Layout . Papireddy Palya . Nagarbhavi BDA Complex . Sumanahalli Cross ■ . Chowdeshwari Nagara . Freedom Fighters Colony . Kanteerava Nagar . **Peenya** ■ . Muthyalanagar . BEL Circle . Patelappa Layout . Hebbala ■ ■. Kempapura ■ **Grey Line (TBC) — Sri Balagangadharanatha Swamiji Stn., Hosahalli** ■ . KHB Colony . Vinayaka Nagara . Sumanahalli Cross ■ . Sunkadakatte . Herohalli . Byadarahalli . Kamath Layout . Kadabagere
Stations in **bold** are operational the rest (in italics) are planned or under construction. Metro interchange stations have the color box indication.
** **Approved**

== See also ==
- List of Ahmedabad Metro stations
- List of Chennai Metro stations
- List of Coimbatore Metro stations
- List of Delhi Metro stations
- List of Hyderabad Metro stations
- List of Jaipur Metro stations
- List of Kochi Metro stations
- List of Kolkata Metro stations
- List of Lucknow Metro stations
- List of Madurai Metro stations
- List of Mumbai Metro stations
- List of Noida Metro stations
- List of Nagpur Metro stations
- List of Navi Mumbai Metro Stations
- List of Pune Metro stations
- List of Surat Metro stations
