= Pink Line (Namma Metro) =

Line of Bengaluru's Namma Metro

- This trainset on standby at Jayadeva Hospital metro station and heading towards Kalena Agrahara metro station

Overview
- Other names: Second North–South Corridor; Line 4; Nagawara–Kalena Agrahara Line
- Native name: Yeḷegeṁpu mārga; Nasugeṁpu mārga; Gulābi mārga
- Status: Elevated Section - Inaugurated on 13th November Opened on 14th November 2026; Underground Section - Under Construction
- Owner: Bangalore Metro Rail Corporation Limited (BMRCL)
- Locale: Bangalore, Karnataka, India
- Termini: S.G. Palya (Suddagunte Palya) (To be extended to Nagawara later); Kalena Agrahara
- Connecting lines: Operational (2): Purple Line Yellow Line; Upcoming (3): Blue Line Red Line Orange Line; Planned (1): Inner Ring Line
- Stations: Operational: 6 Total: 18
- Website: bmrc.co.in

Service
- Type: Metro
- System: Namma Metro
- Operator: Namma Metro
- Depot: Kothanur
- Rolling stock: BEML 6-coach Driverless-Capable EMUs under BMRCL's Package 5RS-DM

History
- Planned opening: Phase 1 - November 13 2026; 8 days ago Phase 2 - May 2027; 5 months' time (TBC)
- Opened: Inaugurated on 13th November Opened on 14th November 2026: Elevated Section

Technical
- Line length: 21.25 km (13.20 mi)
- Num of tracks: 2
- Character: Elevated and Underground
- Track gauge: 1,435 mm (4 ft 8 1/2 in) standard gauge
- Electrification: 750 V DC third rail
- Signalling: CBTC Signalling System

The Pink Line of Namma Metro is a part of the metro rail network for the city of Bengaluru, Karnataka, India. The line is totally 21.25 km (13.20 mi) long and spanned 18 stations, of which as of November 2026, the 7.5 km stretch spanning Kalena Agrahara to Suddagunte Palya spanning 6 stations is operational. The remaining 13.75 km is still currently under construction.

The line stretches from the south of Bangalore, with stations at Hulimavu, IIM Bangalore, and Dairy Circle, to the north of Bengaluru, with stations at Nagawara, Pottery Town and Kadugondanahalli, while passing through central areas of Bengaluru - with an interchange with the Purple Line at MG Road.

The Pink Line is mostly underground (13.92 km (8.65 mi)) but also has a 6.98 km (4.34 mi) elevated section and a 0.48 km (0.30 mi) at-grade (surface) section. There are 18 stations on the line, including 12 underground and 6 elevated ones. Pink Line will also have interchanges with the Yellow line at Jayadeva Hospital station, the Blue Line at Nagawara, and the Orange Line at N.S. Palya - J.P. Nagar 4th Phase. The Blue Line is under construction.

The entire line is planned to open in two phases where the first phase, covering a total distance of 7.5 km stretch (Kalena Agrahara - Suddagunte Palya), is operational from 14th November 2026 whereas the second phase, covering the remaining distance of 13.8 km stretch (Dairy Circle - Nagawara) is expected to be operational around March 2027 (along with Phase 2A of Blue Line).

This line was initially planned as Red Line, when the Phase 2 plan was released in 2014. However, the colour was changed from Red to Pink in late 2019, stating that the colour Red meant "stop" in transport/travel (eg: Red signal, Red flag etc.). However, the colour Red got transferred to another upcoming metro line, belonging to BMRCL Phase-3A

Inauguration of Pink Line at Kalena Agrahara (left) and Jayadeva Hospital metro station (right), in 2026

== History ==
History
Section	Opened	Termini		Length	Stations
Reach 6 (Elevated)	13 November 2026	Kalena Agrahara	S.G. Palya (Suddagunte Palya)	7.50 km (4.66 mi)	6
Reach 6 (UG)	March 2027	S.G. Palya (Suddagunte Palya)	Nagawara	13.76 km (8.55 mi)	12
Total		Kalena Agrahara	Nagawara	21.26 km (13.21 mi)	18

In 2007, as follow up to the Metro Phase that was about to begin construction then, RITES had recommended several mono-rail routes totaling 60 km (37 mi). These recommendations were made as Government of Karnataka requested a survey of feeder routes for Phase l of metro that was to begin construction. One of the routes was entirely on Bannerghatta Road from Bannerghatta National Park up to its northern end at Hosur Road (near Adugodi). At that stage, Bannerghatta Road was not expected to have high growth and dense population, hence the recommendation for Monorail. However, by 2010 itself, it became apparent that Bannerghatta Road would need a higher capacity system than a monorail. Also, Karnataka government did not favor a monorail system and preferred expansion of the Metro system. Accordingly, for its Phase ll, BMRC had requested DMRC for a DPR for the route between Bannerghatta to Yelahanka via:

- Jayadeva Underpass, Hosur Road, Brigade Road, MG Road,
- Kamaraj Road, Tannery Road, Nagavara Junction (along Outer Ring Road), Sahakara Nagar, Vidyaranyapura to Yelahanka.
- Jayamahal Extension, RT Nagar, Nagavara Junction (along Outer Ring Road), Sahakara Nagar to Yelahanka.

The DPR had noted that the Metro Alignment may have to go underground after Jayadeva flyover (along Bannerghatta Road) up to Nagawara junction (along Outer Ring Road). The remaining portion could be elevated.

== Planning ==
Since there were plans for a line along Outer Ring Road and also the possibility that a link to Airport may have to be routed along Airport Road (passing Yelahanka), BMRC opted to terminate the Pink Line in Phase ll at Nagawara.

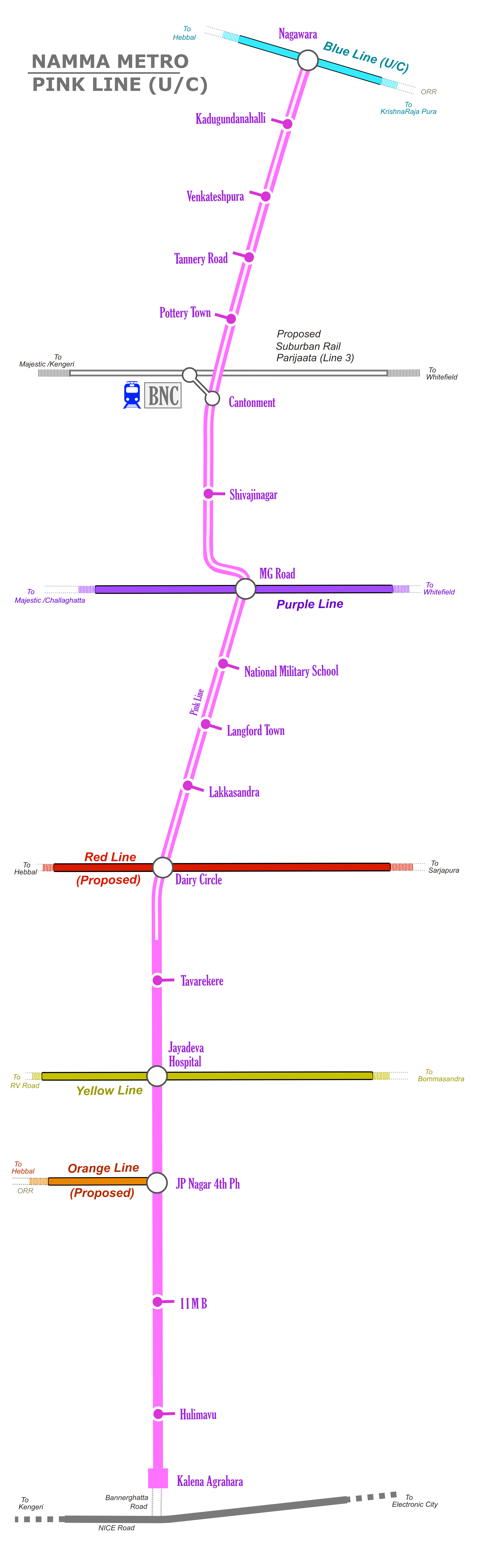

Land requirement was estimated at 50 hectares (120 acres) and Karnataka Industrial Area Development Board (KIADB) was tasked with acquiring land on behalf of BMRC. A total of 690 trees were to be cut to build the line (438 trees for the elevated section and 252 trees for the underground stretch).

On 14 July 2017, BMRC unveiled the alignment of the 13.92 km (8.65 mi) underground section of the line. The alignment included a modification from the original plan - Cantonment metro station had been proposed to be constructed on Indian Railways land next to Bangalore Cantonment Railway Station. Due to technicalities (steep gradient between Shivajinagar and Cantonment, sharp curve past the old location of Cantonment Station, construction below built-up structures, difficulty acquiring land and very high costs of demolishing several properties in the area), BMRC opted to shift Cantonment Metro Station. Cantonment Metro Station would instead be built under a playground belonging to Bruhat Bengaluru Mahanagara Palike (BBMP), near Bamboo Bazaar.

This was resented by sections of the public as the new location would be further away from the entrance of Cantonment station. SWR is however planning new suburban platforms on railways land that is towards the Metro station. A skywalk or pedestrian subway is being planned to connect the Metro station to Cantonment Railway Station.

The MG Road station on the Pink Line is to be located under Kamaraj Road and will serve as an interchange station with the Purple Line.

== Tendering ==
Due to long underground section with tunneling in difficult geology, the cost of the Pink Line was expected to be high. Total cost estimates for the line were ₹11,014 crore (US$1.2 billion) in March 2017 (most expensive line in Phase ll).

BMRCL initially floated tenders for the construction of the 13.9 km (8.6 mi) underground section in four packages during June 2017. However, all bids received were too high (nearly 70% higher). Since bids were too high, all tenders for the underground section had been canceled by BMRCL on 26 March 2018. There was speculation of collusion as bids were similar and each bidder had quoted lowest for one package, thus all four might get to be awarded one package each. The second round of tendering resulted in bids that were closer to estimates by BMRCL and were awarded to three firms during February–November period, 2019. One of the firms (L&T) won two bids. The total awarded tunneling tenders for the underground sections was ₹5,925.95 crores (appx US$812 million).

BMRCL initially awarded the Reach 6 Elevated section to Simplex Infrastructures on 8 September 2017 for a cost of ₹578.70 crore (US$62 million). However, following the poor progress by the company BMRCL terminated the contract and called for a fresh tender to finish the remaining works in February 2021. GR Infraprojects, ITD-Cem, and Afcons made bids for the section with GR Infraprojects emerging as the lowest bidder and thus winning the tender.

Pre-Construction Activity
Tendering	Section	Activity	Successful Bid /Cost	Contractor	Award
Reach-6/2016/Demolition/DLN-7/03	Kalena Agrahara to Tavarekere	Demolition	₹0.77 crore (US$82,000)	B R Chawla Demolition	13 Jul 2016
Reach-6(UG)/2017/Demolition/DLN-8/20	Tavarekere to Nagawara	Demolition	₹1.79 crore (US$190,000)	B R Chawla Demolition	15 May 2017
CEE-1/ELE-US/R-6/PH-II/DPO/2017-18/60	Gottigere Limits to Fortis Hospital	Shifting of Electrical Lines	₹8.75 crore (US$930,000)	R.K Associates	18 May 2018
CEE-1/ELE-US/[R-6, Ph-II]/DPO/2017-18/28	Fortis Hospital to Jayadeva Circle	Shifting of Electrical Lines	₹12.87 crore (US$1.4 million)	Aravinda Electricals	08 Sept 2017
CEE(Ele-1)/DPO/0018/R6UG/2017-18/64	Jayadeva Circle to Dairy Circle	Shifting of Electrical Lines	₹8.71 crore (US$930,000)	Aravinda Electricals	31 Oct 2017
CEE(Ele-1)/DPO/0018/R6UG/2017-18/64	Dairy Circle to Nagawara	Shifting of Electrical Lines	₹8.95 crore (US$960,000)	Gowtham Electricals	14 Jun 2018
Total			₹41.84 crore (US$4.5 million)		
Civil Work
Tendering	Section	Length	Successful Bid /Cost	Contractor	Award
~~Phase-2/Reach-6/elevated/Via &Stn/2016/17~~	~~Kalena Agrahara - Dairy Circle~~	~~7.50 km (4.66 mi)~~	~~₹578.70 crore (US$62 million)~~	~~Simplex Infrastructure~~	~~08 Sept 2017~~
Reach 6 UG Pkg-1	Dairy Circle - Langford Town	3.65 km (2.27 mi)	₹1,526.33 crore (US$218 million)	Afcons	06 Nov 2019
Reach 6 UG Pkg-2	Langford Town - Shivajinagar	2.76 km (1.71 mi)	₹1,329.14 crore (US$140 million)	Larsen & Toubro	28 Feb 2019
Reach 6 UG Pkg-3	Shivajinagar - Tannery Road	2.88 km (1.79 mi)	₹1,299.23 crore (US$140 million)	Larsen & Toubro	28 Feb 2019
Reach 6 UG Pkg-4	Tannery Road - Nagawara	4.59 km (2.85 mi)	₹1,771.25 crore (US$253 million)	ITD-Cem	06 Nov 2019
Reach-6/Elevated/Via&Stn/RC/2021/75	Kalena Agrahara - Dairy Circle	7.50 km (4.66 mi)	₹364.87 crore (US$39 million)	GR Infraprojects	03 Aug 2021
Note	Reach 6 Elevated contract awarded to Simplex Infrastructure was cancelled by BMRCL due to poor progress. 37% of the civil work was finished at that time of cancellation. BMRCL later invited new tenders to finish the remaining civil work, which was then awarded to GR Infraprojects.				
Total		21.25 km (13.20 mi)	₹6,504.94 crore (US$690 million)		
TVS & E&M
Tendering	Section	Length	Successful Bid /Cost	Contractor	Award
ECTVS – 01	TVS, ECS & SCADA		₹202.80 crore (US$22 million)	Blue Star	02 Jun 2022
ECTVS – 02	TVS, ECS & SCADA		₹212.84 crore (US$23 million)	UMPESL	06 Mar 2023
E&M-4/UG & Elev/Ph-II	Electrical & Mechanical		₹186.88 crore (US$20 million)	Blue Star	25 May 2022
E&M-5/UG/Ph-II	Electrical & Mechanical		₹185.54 crore (US$20 million)	Blue Star	30 Nov 2022
Total			₹788.06 crore (US$84 million)		
Station Work
Tendering	Section	Length	Successful Bid /Cost	Contractor	Award
Phase II/ICB No. 4 ELEV-DM	Elevators	Kalena Agrahara to Tavarekere	₹6.69 crore (US$710,000)	Johnson Lifts	03 Feb 2021
Phase II/ICB No.7 ESCAL - DM	Elevated Station Escalators	Dairy Circle - Nagawara	₹32.15 crore (US$3.4 million)	Schindler India	2 June 2021
Phase-II/5 ELEV-DM	Elevators	Dairy Circle - Nagawara	₹13.72 crore (US$1.5 million)	Johnson Lifts	19 Aug 2022
R6-Elevated/Arch. Works/STN/2022/87	Architectural Finishing Works	Kalena Agrahara to Tavarekere	₹54.49 crore (US$5.8 million)	Mysore Light & Interiors	11 Aug 2022
Bal Arch. Wks/RT01 & RT02/R6-UG/2025/124	Architectural Finishing Works	Cantonment - Nagawara	₹23.75 crore (US$2.5 million)	DC Facility Management	23 May 2025
Bal Arch. Wks/RT01 & RT02/R6-UG/2025/125	Architectural Finishing Works	Dairy Circle - Shivajinagar	₹27.02 crore (US$2.9 million)	ANU Constructions	23 May 2025
Total			₹157.82 crore (US$17 million)		
Miscellaneous
Tendering	Section	Length	Successful Bid /Cost	Contractor	Award
Phase II/ICB No.EP4-CC	750V DC Third Rail electrification		₹164.10 crore (US$18 million)	Linxon India	06 Feb 2021
Reach-6/KOTHNURDEPOT/2019/58	Kothanur Depot		₹150.83 crore (US$16 million)	ISGEC Heavy Engineering	9 July 2020
60E1 880 Grade Rails/RT01/2020/68	Track Work		₹20.08 crore (US$2.1 million)	Jindal Steel	12 Jan 2021
5RS-DM	Rolling Stock (96 Coaches)		₹959.04 crore (US$100 million)	BEML	08 Aug 2023
5RS-DM	Rolling Stock (42 Coaches)		₹405.00 crore (US$43 million)	BEML	29 Mar 2025
S&T-DM	CBTC signaling & Platform Screen Door		₹308.52 crore (US$33 million)	Alstom Transport	12 Jun 2024
CEE/ELE/SL/R6/PH-II/2019-20/DPO/134/231	LED Street Lights, Control Switches, Cables		₹3.05 crore (US$330,000)	Basavashree Electricals	16 Sept 2019
Reach-6/Road work/2020/67	Road, Drain, Footpath development works		₹8.00 crore (US$850,000)	M R Pro Tech	20 Nov 2020
Total			₹2,015.57 crore (US$220 million)		
Total Cost		21.25 km (13.20 mi)	₹9,508.33 crore (US$1.0 billion)		

== Construction ==
Elevated Section

In March 2017, BMRC had floated tender for construction of the 7.5 km (4.7 mi) elevated section between Kalena Agrahara (previously Gottigere) and Sadduguntepalya-Tavarekere (previously Swagat Cross) stations for construction of the elevated section of Pink Line with viaduct, five stations and depot entry line to Kothanur depot. The tender was awarded to Simplex Constructions for 578.70 crores on 8 September 2017.

Due to very slow progress by Simplex, their tender was canceled and a fresh tender was called for the remaining works in February 2021. GR Infra was the lowest bidder and the tender was awarded to them in July, 2021.

Underground Section

Pre-tunneling construction work and piling for stations began in May 2019 by L&T. Tunnel boring using TBMs began in August–September 2020 by L&T with two TBMs. L&T uses four TBMs named Urja, Avni, Vindhya and Lavi. Two TBMs (Avni and Lavi) are used for tunnel boring southwards from Shivajinagar towards Rashtriya Military School. The other two TBMs (Urja and Vindhya) are used for boring southwards from Cantonment to Shivajinagar after which they will be shifted back to Cantonment to bore tunnels northwards towards Tannery road.

Tunnel boring work by Afcons with three TBMs (Varada, Rudra and Vamika) on the section between Rashtriya Military School and Dairy Circle began during March–June 2021 period.

ITD-Cem began tunnel works during June–August 2021 period on the Venkateshpura-Nagawara section.

The underground part of the Pink Line in Namma Metro is almost finished, with 95% completion between Tannery Road and Nagawara that stretches 13.76 km (8.55 mi) between two underground points. As per latest updates from the BMRCL officials, the elevated section is expected to be operational by November 2026, whereas the underground section is expected to be operational by March 2027.

On the last week of November, Namma Metro started introducing the Platform Screen Doors on this line's underground stations and has installed a mock-up at Mahatma Gandhi Road. These will be installed in all underground metro stations (including Blue Line's KIAL Terminals, Airport City and Yellow Line's Konappana Agrahara which will have PSGs), which will prevent passengers from falling or jumping into the metro tracks. This will be the first metro line to have installed the PSDs for Namma Metro.

On January 11, 2026, Namma Metro began rolling stock type tests on the elevated corridor between Kalena Agrahara and Sadduguntepalya-Tavarekere. These tests are meant to rigorously assess new trains and components for safety, performance, and regulatory compliance through lab and on-track trials, ensuring that they meet standards before public service. Crashworthiness, braking performance, and dynamic performance are among the parameters generally assessed during such tests to prevent issues and ensure passenger safety. The BMRCL is conducting tests with a six-coach train delivered by Bharat Earth Movers Limited in December of last year. According to BMRCL, these tests are expected to be completed by mid-April, after which the appropriate authorities will approve the train for commercial operations. “During the above-mentioned period, traction and brake type tests, oscillation trials at various speeds, integration tests with signalling, and power and telecommunication systems, among others, will be conducted,” the BMRCL said in a statement.

== Funding ==
In May 2017, BMRC received in-principle approval from the European Investment Bank (EIB) to fund construction of the Kalena Agrahara-Nagawara line through a ₹3,700 crore (US$400 million) loan. The BMRC secured an agreement with the Asian Infrastructure Investment Bank (AIIB) on 4 June 2019 to receive a soft loan of ₹2,255.14 crore (US$240 million) to be repaid over a period of 25 years. The line will also be funded by the Central and State Governments.

== Stations ==
The line will have a total of 18 stations. The northern end of the line, which is underground, has 12 underground stations and the southern end, which is elevated, has 6 elevated stations.

=== Interchanges ===
Passenger interchange facilities, connecting to other metro and railway lines, will be provided at the following stations:

- N.S. Palya - JP Nagar 4th Phase (Connects to the Orange Line, which runs from N.S Palya - JP Nagar 4th Phase to Kempapura)
- Jayadeva Hospital (Connects to the Yellow Line, which runs from Rashtreeya Vidyalaya Road to Delta Electronics Bommasandra)
- Dairy Circle (Connects to the proposed Red Line, which runs from Hebbala to Sarjapura)
- Mahatma Gandhi Road (Connects to the Purple Line, which runs from Whitefield (Kadugodi) to Challaghatta)
- Bangalore Cantonment Railway Station (Connects to the Bengaluru Cantonment Railway Station)
- Nagawara (Connects to the Blue Line, which runs from Central Silk Board to KIAL Terminals)

Pink Line
#	Station Name		Opening	Connections	Station Layout	Platform Level Type
#	English	Kannada	Opening	Connections	Station Layout	Platform Level Type
1	Kalena Agrahara	ಕಾಳೇನ ಅಗ್ರಹಾರ	14 November 2026		Elevated	Island & Side
2	Hulimavu	ಹುಳಿಮಾವು	14 November 2026		Elevated	Side
3	Bilekahalli-I.I.M.B	ಬಿಳೇಕಹಳ್ಳಿ - ಐ.ಐ.ಎಂ.ಬಿ	14 November 2026		Elevated	Side
4	N.S. Palya - J.P. Nagar 4th Phase	ಎನ್. ಎಸ್. ಪಾಳ್ಯ - ಜ.ಪಿ. ನಗರ 4ನೇ ಹಂತ	14 November 2026	Orange Line (Approved)	Elevated	Side & Side
5	Jayadeva Hospital	ಜಯದೇವ ಆಸ್ಪತ್ರೆ	14 November 2026	Yellow Line	Elevated	Side
6	S.G. Palya (Suddagunte Palya)	ಎಸ್.ಜಿ. ಪಾಳ್ಯ (ಸುದ್ದಗುಂಟೆ ಪಾಳ್ಯ)	14 November 2026		Elevated	Side
7	Dairy Circle	ಡೈರಿ ವೃತ್ತ	May 2027	Red Line (Proposed)	Underground	Island
8	Lakkasandra	ಲಕ್ಕಸಂದ್ರ	May 2027		Underground	Island
9	Langford Town	ಲ್ಯಾಂಗ್ಫೋರ್ಡ್ ಟೌನ್	May 2027		Underground	Island
10	National Military School	ರಾಷ್ಟ್ರೀಯ ಸ್ಯೆನಿಕ ಶಾಲೆ	May 2027		Underground	Island
11	Mahatma Gandhi Road	ಮಹಾತ್ಮಾ ಗಾಂಧಿ ರಸ್ತೆ	May 2027	Purple Line	Underground	Island & Side
12	Shivajinagar	ಶಿವಾಜಿನಗರ	May 2027	Shivajinagar TTMC	Underground	Island
13	Bangalore Cantonment Railway Station	ಬೆಂಗಳೂರು ದಂಡು ರೈಲ್ವೇ ನಿಲ್ದಾಣ	May 2027	Bengaluru Cantt.	Underground	Island
14	Pottery Town	ಪಾಟರಿ ಟೌನ್	May 2027		Underground	Island
15	Tannery Road	ಟ್ಯಾನರಿ ರಸ್ತೆ	May 2027		Underground	Island
16	Venkateshpura	ವೆಂಕಟೇಶಪುರ	May 2027		Underground	Island
17	Kadugundanahalli	ಕಾಡುಗುಂಡನಹಳ್ಳಿ	May 2027		Underground	Island
18	Nagawara	ನಾಗವಾರ	May 2027	Blue Line (Under Construction)	Underground	Island & Side

== See also ==
- Namma Metro
  - Purple Line
  - Green Line
  - Yellow Line
  - Blue Line
  - Orange Line
  - Grey Line
  - Red Line
  - Inner Ring Line
  - List of Namma Metro Stations
- Rapid transit in India
- List of metro systems
