= Ram Jhula, Nagpur =

Coordinates: 21.1535°N 79.0894°E

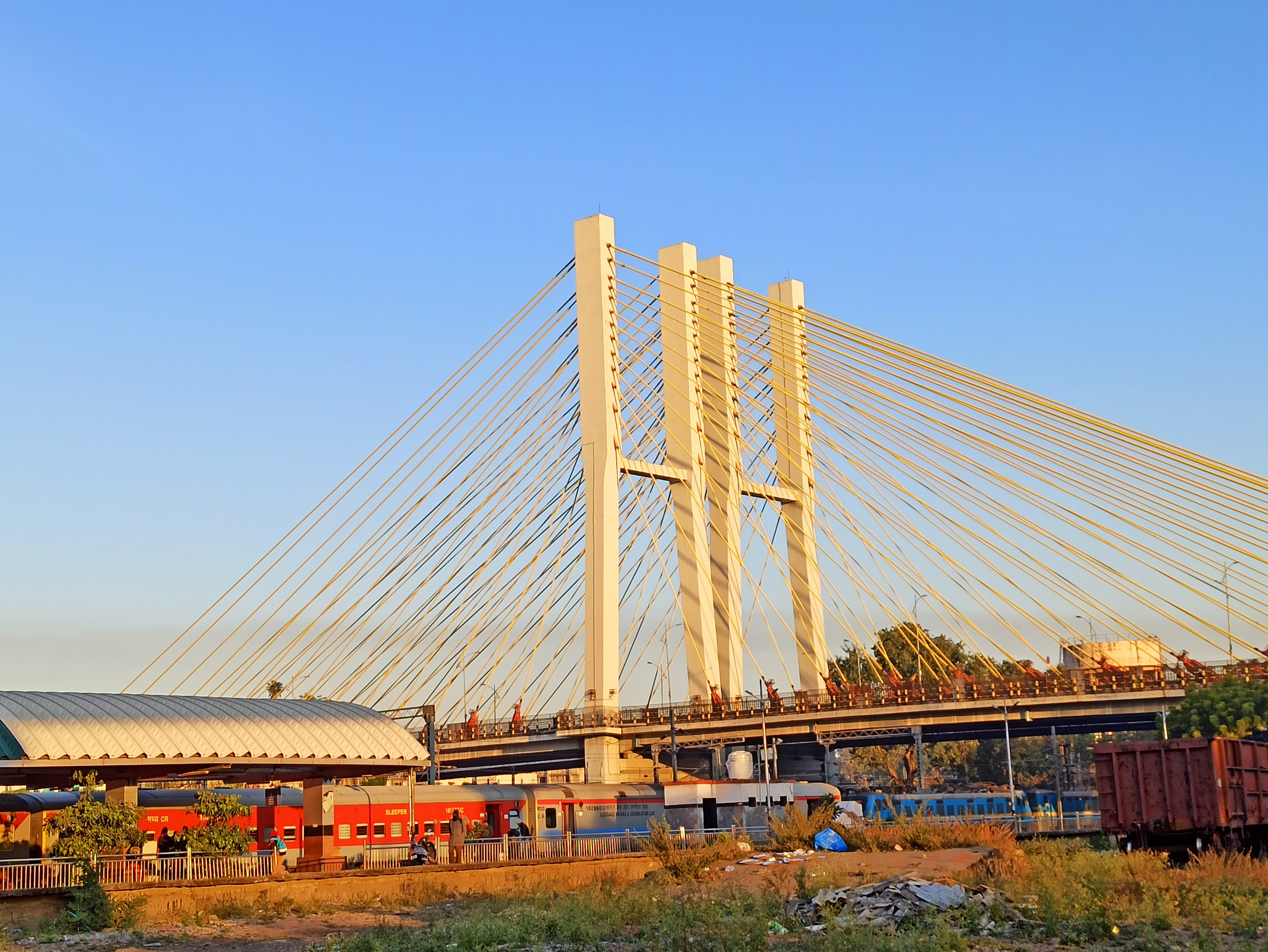
Ram Jhoola Bridge in Nagpur

The Ram Jhula consists of two parallel cable-stayed railway over-bridges in Nagpur, India. The 606.74 metres (1,990.6 ft) long bridge crosses the railway tracks north of Nagpur Junction railway station. The Blue Line of the Nagpur Metro runs along the centre of the bridge on the eastern side.

== History ==
A bridge was originally built by the British in 1927 to connect what was then Old Nagpur and New Nagpur that lay across the tracks of the Great Indian Peninsular Railway (GIPR, the precursor to Central Railway. The South East Central Railway and Nagpur Municipal Corporation were informed by the British contractors that the bridge had lasted its guaranteed service life and hence be kept out of bounds for heavy vehicles. Subsequently, the Maharashtra State Road Development Corporation (MSRDC) was handed over the responsibility to demolish and reconstruct the bridge.

== Reconstruction ==
The MSRDC began work in 2006 by building a three-lane cable-stayed bridge parallel to the old bridge. The bridge was built by Afcons, a subsidiary of the Shapoorji Pallonji Group. As per the plan, the old bridge would be demolished once the parallel bridge was open to traffic following which a second three-lane bridge would be built, bringing the total number of lanes to six. However, a dispute arose between MSRDC and the Maharashtra Metro Rail Corporation Limited (MahaMetro) over the alignment of the Blue Line of the Nagpur Metro. MahaMetro sought permission to build the metro between the two bridges but the MSRDC refused. In 2016, the Nagpur bench of the Bombay High Court asked Maharashtra Chief Minister Devendra Fadnavis to resolve the matter. Subsequently, MSRDC and MahaMetro agreed to integrate the two structures. The last 200 metres (660 ft) of the second bridge would be built by the latter with two levels with the metro at the upper level before proceeding towards the railway station.
