= Afcons Infrastructure =

Indian construction and engineering company

Afcons Infrastructure Limited
- Formerly: Asia Foundations and Construction Limited
- Type: Public
- Traded as: NSE: AFCONS; BSE: 544280
- Industry: Infrastructure
- Founded: 1959
- Headquarters: Mumbai, Maharashtra, India
- Area served: Worldwide
- Key people: Shapoor Pallonji Mistry (Chairman)
- Revenue: ▲₹13,646 crore (US$1.4 billion) (FY24)
- Operating income: ▲₹1,583 crore (US$160 million) (FY24)
- Net income: ▲₹449 crore (US$47 million) (FY24)
- Parent: Shapoorji Pallonji Group
- Website: afcons.com

Afcons Infrastructure Limited is an Indian multinational construction and engineering company based in Mumbai. The company is involved in infrastructure EPC projects such as bridges, flyovers, metros, railway lines, tunnels, highways, ports and marine works, barrages, and oil and gas structures. It has been a part of the Shapoorji Pallonji Group since 2000.

== History ==
The company was founded in 1959 as Rodio Hazarat & Co, a joint venture between Rodio Foundation Engineering of Switzerland and Hazarat & Co of India. In the initial years, the company undertook foundation work of office buildings in Mumbai's then-business district Nariman Point. In 1976, the Swiss partner exited the joint venture by selling its stake to an employees-led consortium, owing to the Foreign Exchange Regulation Act legislation passed in 1973 which affected its business viability. The company was renamed as Asia Foundations and Construction in the same year.

The company later expanded its business interests beyond foundation engineering to include marine construction (jetties, docks and harbours) and transportation works (roads and bridges). In 1997, the company was renamed to Afcons Infrastructure. In the 1990s, the company raised debt funding from ICICI, which later converted the debt to equity, obtaining a 47.37% stake by 1998.

In 2000, the Shapoorji Pallonji Group acquired a majority stake in Afcons by buying out ICICI's entire stake and an additional 6.59% from promoter Hazarat family. Shapoorji Pallonji Group eventually increased its stake to over 97% by acquiring shares held by employees. Cyrus Mistry served as chairman from 2003 until 2012, when he was succeeded by his brother Shapoor Mistry.

== Notable projects ==
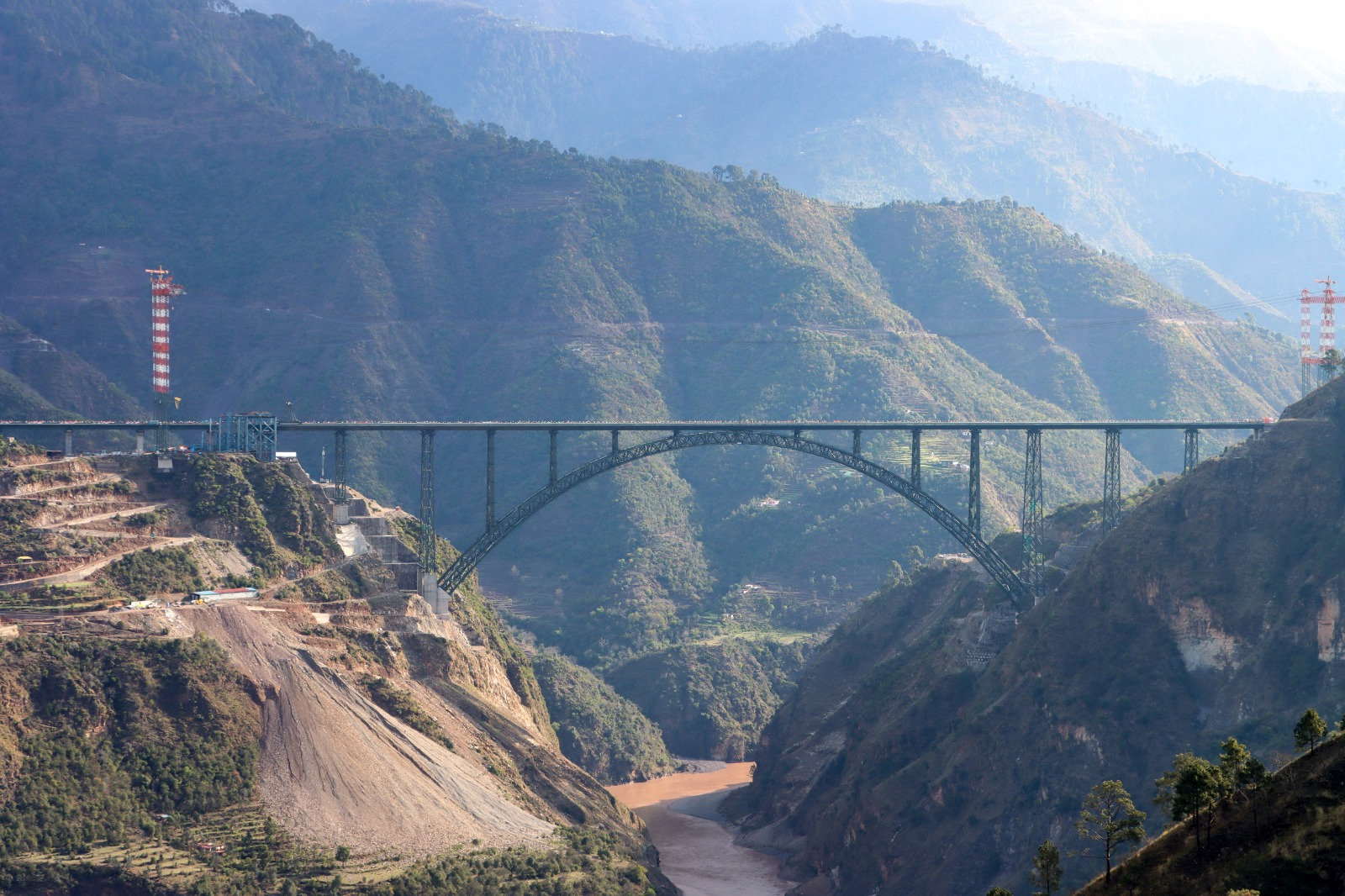
Chenab Rail Bridge in Jammu division

Tiger Valley Bridge on Mumbai-Pune Expressway

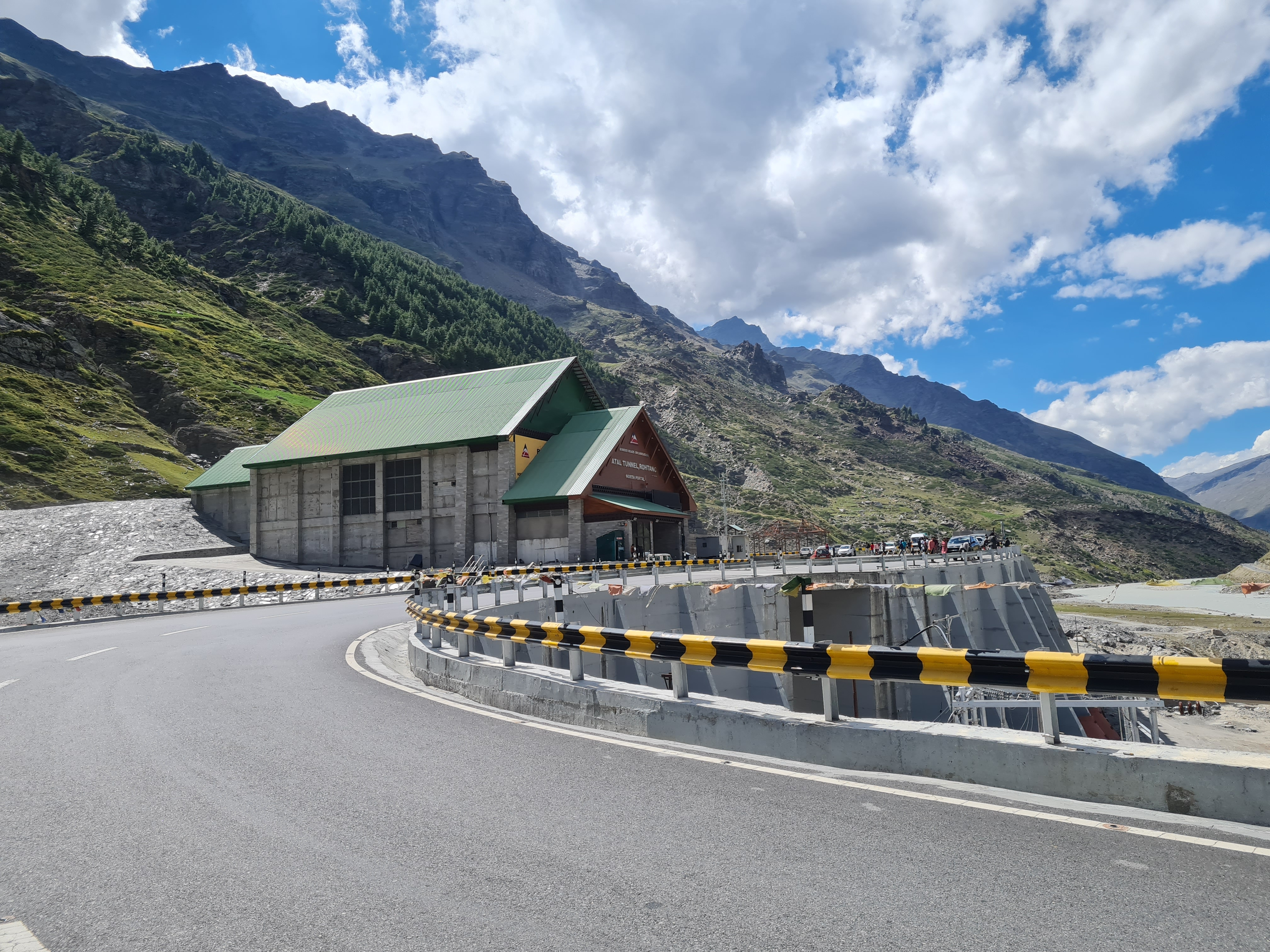
North portal of Atal Tunnel, at an altitude of 10,075 ft

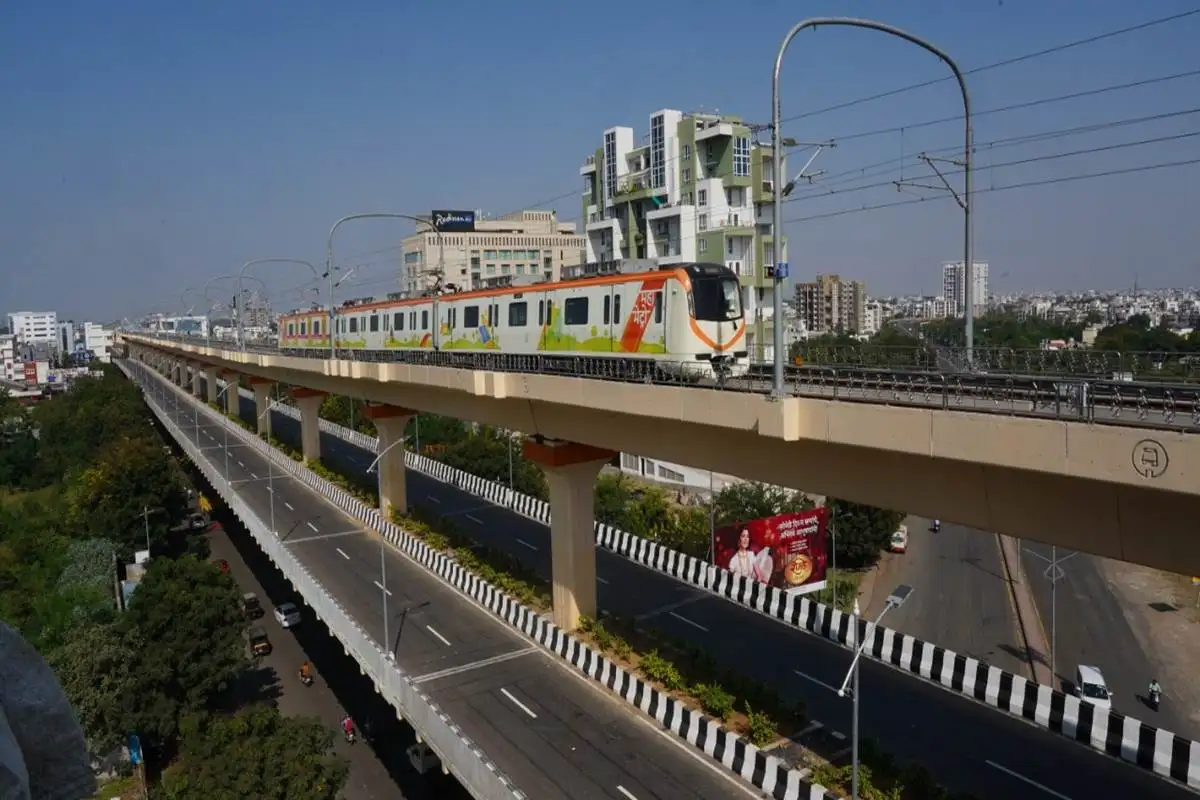
Nagpur's four-level corridor comprising underpass, railway line, highway and metro

- Tunnels such as Atal Tunnel, East–West Metro Tunnel (Kolkata), USBRL T49 tunnel, and Thane Creek undersea bullet train tunnel
- Bridges such as Chenab Rail Bridge, Tiger Valley Bridge, Airoli Bridge, KR Puram Bridge (Bangalore), Ram Jhula (Nagpur), Vembanad Rail Bridge (Kerala), Mahatma Gandhi Setu rehabilitation (Bihar), and Thilamalé Bridge (Maldives)
- Port and marine projects including Dahej Port liquid cargo berth, Kochi LNG Terminal, Chhara Port breakwater, and Sohar Port jetty (Oman)
- Metro works in Kolkata, Chennai, Kanpur, Bengaluru, Delhi, Mumbai, Kochi, Nagpur, Ahmedabad, and Delhi–Meerut RRTS
- Highway projects such as Udhampur–Jammu highway, Agra–Lucknow Expressway, and Samruddhi Mahamarg
- Railway projects including Tema-Mpakadan Railway Line (Ghana) and Dhaka-Chittagong railway corridor doubling
- Water structures like Saraswati Barrage and Pakal Dul Dam
- Agaléga Military Base (Mauritius)
