= Dairy Circle metro station =

Upcoming Namma Metro interchange station for Pink & Red Lines

Dairy Circle
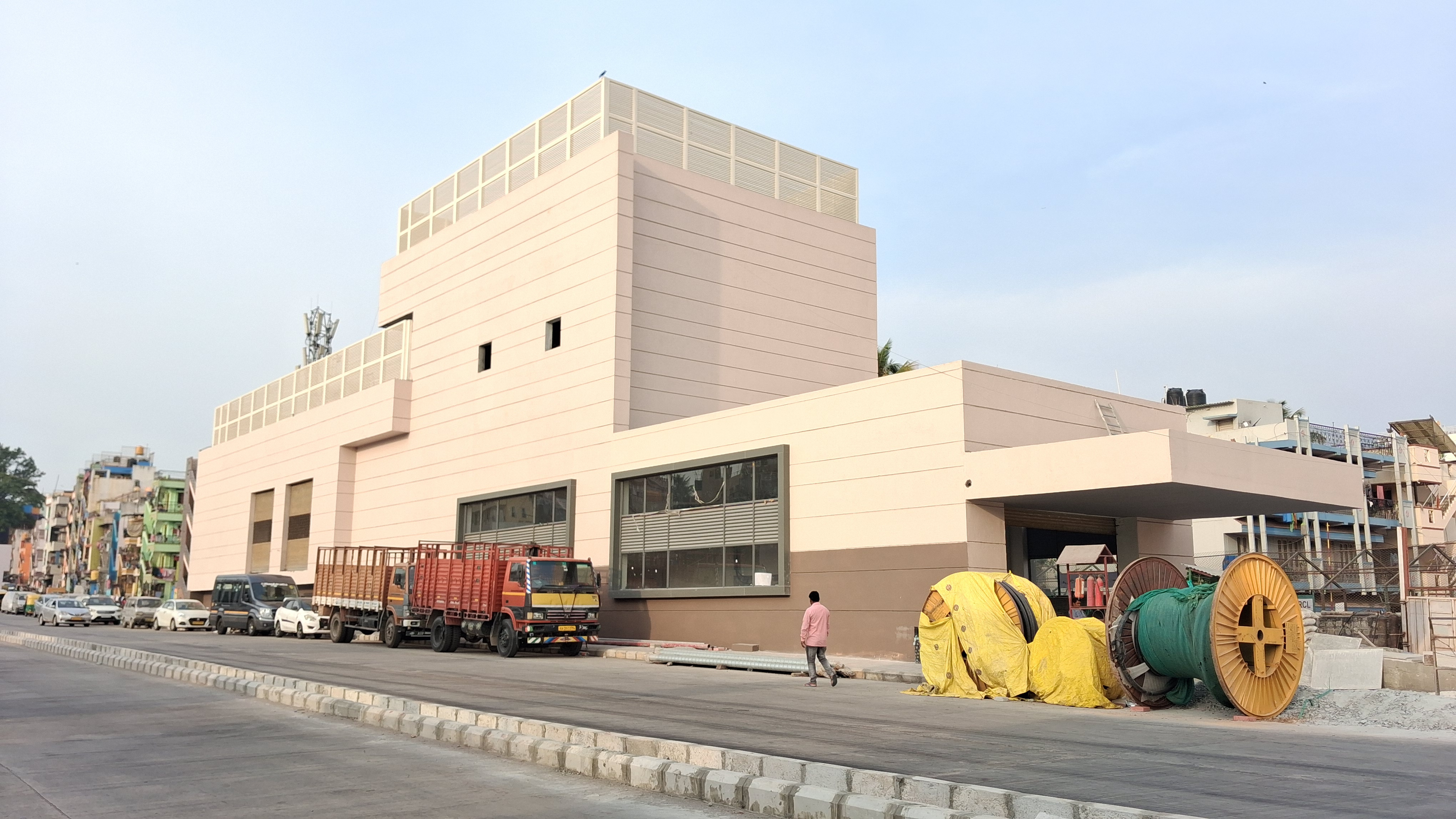
- Under Construction of this metro station under Namma Metro's Pink Line as of April 2026

General information
- Location: Lakkasandra, Laljinagar, Wilson Garden, Bengaluru, Karnataka 560030
- Coordinates: 12.94045°N 77.60235°E
- System: Namma Metro station
- Owner: Bangalore Metro Rail Corporation Ltd (BMRCL)
- Operator: Namma Metro
- Line: Pink Line Red Line
- Platforms: Pink Line Island platform (TBC) Platform-1 → Nagawara; Platform-2 → Kalena Agrahara; Platform Numbers (TBC) Red Line Platform numbers (TBC) (TBC)
- Tracks: 2 (TBC)

Construction
- Structure type: Underground, double track
- Platform levels: 2 (TBC)
- Parking: (TBC)
- Accessible: (TBC)
- Architect: Afcons Infrastructure

Other information
- Status: Under Construction; Under Construction
- Station code: (TBC)

History
- Opening: May 2027; 5 months' time (TBC); 2030; 4 years' time (TBC)
- Electrified: (TBC)

Services
| Preceding station | Namma Metro | Following station |
|---|---|---|
| Lakkasandra towards Nagawara | Pink Line (operational around May 2027) | Tavarekere towards Kalena Agrahara |
| NIMHANS towards Hebbala | Red Line (Under Construction) | Koramangala II Block towards Sarjapura |
Route map
Location

Dairy Circle is an upcoming underground metro station on the north–south corridor of the Pink Line of Namma Metro in Bengaluru, India with plans to make an interchange with the proposed Red Line. This metro station consists of the main Dairy Circle Flyover where to the east leads towards Silk Board junction and Christ University, to the west leads towards NIMHANS Hospital, Indira Gandhi Institute of Child Health Hospital, to the north leads towards Bosch (Bengaluru South Campus), Karnataka Federal Foundation and to the south leads towards Sri Jayadeva Institute of Cardiovascular Sciences and Research, a healthcare institute in South Bengaluru.

As per the latest updates, this metro station, under the second phase (Pink Line), covering the total distance of 13.8 km stretch (Dairy Circle - Nagawara) is expected to be operational around May 2027 instead of December 2026

== History ==
=== Pink Line ===
In June 2017, Bangalore Metro Rail Corporation Limited (BMRCL) sought bids for constructing the Dairy Circle metro station along the 3.66 km South Ramp - National Military School stretch of the 21.25 km Pink Line of Namma Metro. In November 2019, Afcons Infrastructures emerged as the lowest bidders for this stretch which aligned closely with the original estimate, thus leading to a successful award for this company. They commenced the construction of this metro station as per the agreements.

== Station layout ==
Pink Line Station layout - to be confirmed

| G | Street level | Exit/ Entrance |
| L1 | Mezzanine | Fare control, station agent, Ticket/token, shops |
| L2 | Platform 2 Southbound | Towards → Kalena Agrahara; Next station: S.G. Palya (Suddagunte Palya) |
| L2 | Island platform | Doors will open on the right |
| L2 | Platform 1 Northbound | Towards ← Nagawara; Next station: Lakkasandra |
| L2 |

Red Line Station layout - to be confirmed

| G | Street level | Exit/ entrance |
| L1 | Mezzanine | Fare control, station agent, Ticket/token, shops |
| L2 | Platform # Northbound | Towards → Hebbala; Next station: NIMHANS |
| L2 | Island platform | Doors will open on the right |
| L2 | Platform # Southbound | Towards ← Sarjapura; Next station: Koramangala 2nd Block |
| L2 |

== See also ==
- Bengaluru
- List of Namma Metro stations
- Transport in Karnataka
- List of metro systems
- List of rapid transit systems in India
- Bengaluru Metropolitan Transport Corporation
