= Nagawara metro station =

Upcoming Namma Metro station under Pink & Blue Lines

Nagawara
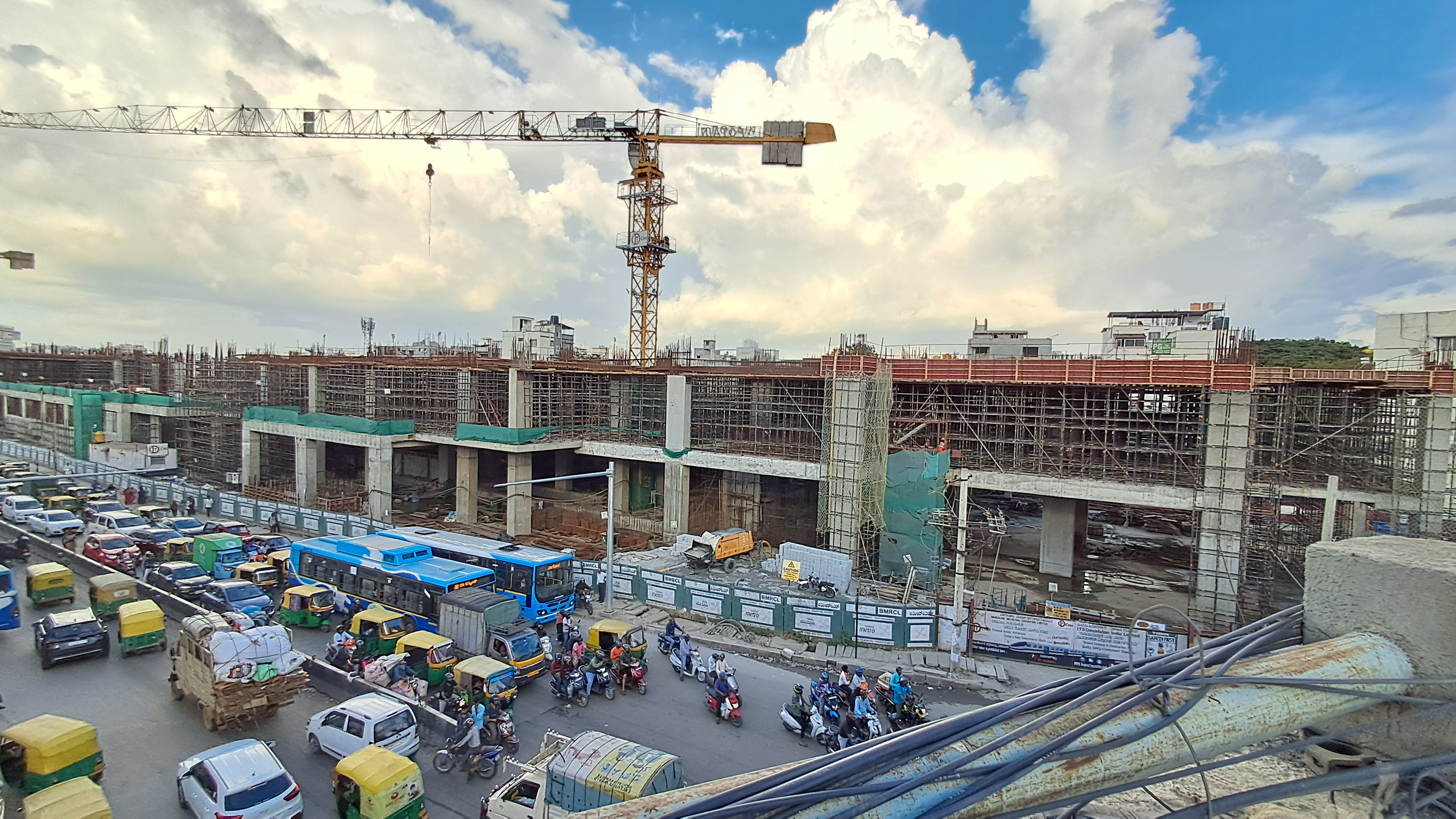
- Under Construction of Nagawara metro station under Pink Line of Namma Metro as of October 2024

General information
- Location: 5th Block, Ashwath Nagar, HBR Layout, Bengaluru, Karnataka 560045
- Coordinates: 13.04051°N 77.62466°E
- System: Namma Metro station
- Owner: Bangalore Metro Rail Corporation Ltd (BMRCL)
- Operator: Namma Metro
- Line: Pink Line Blue Line
- Platforms: Island platform (TBC); Platform-1 → Train Terminates Here; Platform-2 → Kalena Agrahara; Side platform (TBC); Platform-3 → Krishnarajapura / Central Silk Board; Platform-4 → KIAL Terminals; Platform numbers (TBC)
- Tracks: 4 (TBC)
- Connections: Nagawara Junction Bus Stop

Construction
- Structure type: Underground (Pink Line), Elevated (Blue Line) & Double track x2
- Platform levels: 4 (TBC)
- Parking: (TBC)
- Accessible: (TBC)
- Architect: ITD Cementation India Ltd. Nagarjuna Construction Company (NCC)

Other information
- Status: Under Construction
- Station code: (TBC)

History
- Opening: May 2027; 5 months' time (TBC); December 2027; 12 months' time (TBC)
- Electrified: (TBC)

Services
Preceding station	Namma Metro	Following station
Terminus	Pink Line (Operational around May 2027)	Kadugundanahalli towards Kalena Agrahara
HBR Layout towards Krishnarajapura or Central Silk Board	Blue Line (Operational around December 2027)	Veerannapalya towards KIAL Terminals
Route map
Location

Nagawara is an upcoming important underground northern terminal metro station on the north–south corridor of the Pink Line and upcoming elevated metro station on the Blue Line of Namma Metro in Bengaluru, India. This metro station will be an interchange metro station between Pink Line and Blue Line.

This metro station will consist of the main Nagawara Junction which leads to Thanisandra, Yelahanka in the northside, Kalyan Nagar, Krishnarajapuram in the eastside, Bangalore East, Bangalore Cantonment in the southside and Hebbal, Yeswanthpur in the westside. It will also include prime locations like MSR Elements Mall, Bhartiya City and Manyata Embassy Business Park.

As per the latest updates, this metro station, under the second phase (Pink Line), covering the total distance of 13.8 km stretch (Dairy Circle - Nagawara) is expected to be operational around May 2027 instead of December 2026 and under the Phase 2B, covering the stretch of 11.35 km (Krishnarajapura - Hebbala) is expected to be operational around December 2027 (under Blue Line).

== History ==
=== Pink Line ===
In June 2017, Bangalore Metro Rail Corporation Limited (BMRCL) sought bids for constructing the Nagawara metro station along the 4.59 km Shadi Mahal Ramp - North Ramp stretch of the 21.25 km Pink Line of Namma Metro. In November 2019, ITD Cementation India emerged as the lowest bidder for this stretch which aligned closely with the original estimate, thus leading to successful award for this company. They commenced the construction of this metro station as per the agreements.

Unlike other underground stations on the Pink Line, Nagawara station features a different design. Typically, both the concourse level (ticketing and security area) and the train platforms are located underground. However, at Nagawara, BMRCL chose to construct the concourse level at ground level (at grade), while keeping the train platforms underground. The primary reason for this decision was due to the presence of a Rajakaluve (stormwater drain) near the northern end and make it easier for future expansion if it takes place.

=== Blue Line ===
On November 17, 2020, the Bangalore Metro Rail Corporation Limited (BMRCL) invited bids for the construction of the metro station, part of the 11 km Reach 2B – Package 1 (Krishnarajapura - Kempapura) of the 37.692 km Blue Line of Namma Metro. On September 14, 2021, Nagarjuna Construction Company Ltd. (NCC Ltd.) was chosen as the lowest bidder for this segment, with their proposal closely matching the initial cost estimates. As a result, the contract was awarded to the company, which led to the beginning of the construction works of this metro station as per the agreed terms.

=== Nagawara One ===
Nagawara one is an under construction commercial complex on top of the underground station. The commercial complex is expected to be of four floors with a toal area of 27,000 square meters.

== Station layout ==
Pink Line Station Layout - To Be Confirmed

G	Street level	Exit/ Entrance
M	Mezzanine	Fare control, station agent, Ticket/token, shops
P	Platform 2 Southbound	Towards → Kalena Agrahara; Next Station: Kadugundanahalli
P	Island platform | Doors will open on the right
P	Platform 1 Northbound	Towards ← Train Terminates Here

Blue Line Station Layout - To Be Confirmed

G	Street level	Exit/Entrance
L1	Mezzanine	Fare control, station agent, Metro Card vending machines, crossover
L2	Side platform | Doors will open on the left
L2	Platform # Eastbound	Towards → Krishnarajapura / Central Silk Board; Next Station: HBR Layout
L2	Platform # Westbound	Towards ← Hebbala / KIAL Terminals; Next Station: Veerannapalya
L2	Side platform | Doors will open on the left
L2

== See also ==
- Bangalore
- List of Namma Metro stations
- Transport in Karnataka
- List of metro systems
- List of rapid transit systems in India
- Bangalore Metropolitan Transport Corporation
