= SG Palya - Suddagunte Palya metro station =

Namma Metro's Pink Line interim terminal metro station

S.G. Palya (Suddagunte Palya)
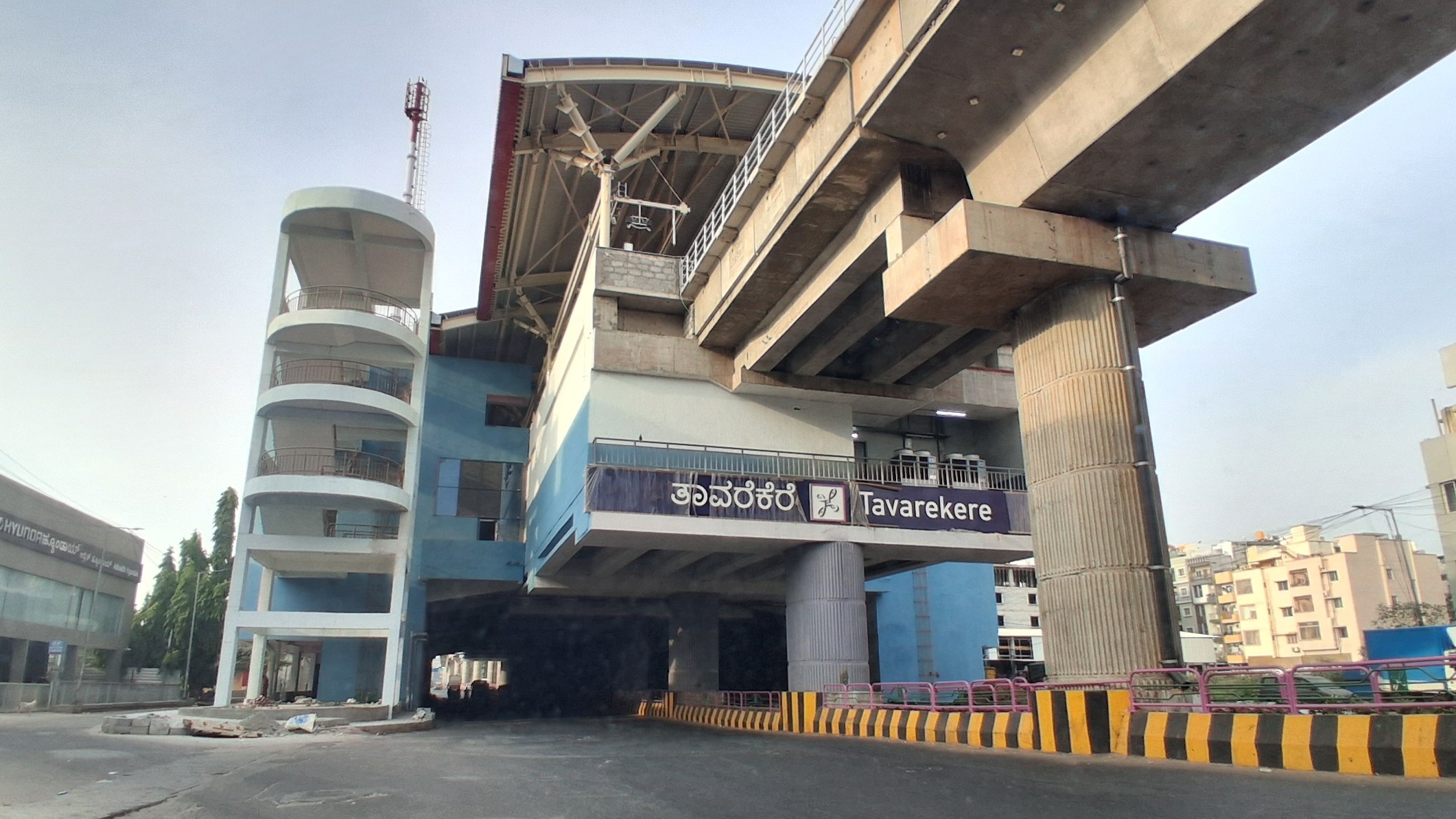
- This metro station's final stages before Operations under Namma Metro's Pink Line as of April 2026

General information
- Location: 47, Bannerghatta Rd, SR Krishnappa Garden, Hombegowda Nagar, Bengaluru, Karnataka 560041
- Coordinates: 12.92942°N 77.60049°E
- System: Namma Metro station
- Owner: Bangalore Metro Rail Corporation Ltd (BMRCL)
- Operator: Namma Metro
- Line: Pink Line
- Platforms: Side platform Platform-1 → Train Terminates Here * Platform-2 → Kalena Agrahara * (Further extension to Nagawara in the future)
- Tracks: 2

Construction
- Structure type: Elevated, Double track
- Platform levels: 2 (TBC)
- Parking: (TBC)
- Accessible: (TBC)
- Architect: GR Infraprojects Ltd. (Simplex contract terminated in 2021)

Other information
- Status: Operational
- Station code: (TBC)

History
- Opened: 13 November 2026; 7 days ago (Inaugural run); 14 November 2026; 6 days ago (Commercial)
- Electrified: 750 V DC third rail
- Former names: Tavarekere, Swagath Cross

Services
Preceding station	Namma Metro	Following station
Terminus	Pink Line (Partially Operational)	Jayadeva Hospital towards Kalena Agrahara
Dairy Circle towards Nagawara	Pink Line (Operational around March 2027)	Jayadeva Hospital towards Kalena Agrahara
Route map
Location

S.G. Palya - Suddagunte Palya (formerly known as Tavarekere) is an elevated terminal metro station on the North-South corridor of the Pink Line of Namma Metro in Bengaluru, India. Around this metro station holds the main Tavarekere Park followed by some prime locations like Byrasandra Lake Park, Sagar Hospitals (Jayanagar) and the famous Dairy Circle Flyover which leads towards Nexus Mall (Koramangala) as well as CHRIST (Deemed to be University) in the east and towards Lal Bagh in the west.

This metro station is a terminal station of the elevated stretch (Kalena Agrahara - S.G. Palya) of the Pink Line. When the rest of the Pink Line (currently under construction) becomes operational, it will no longer be a terminal station. It was inaugurated by the Prime Minister Narendra Modi on 13 November 2026.

== History ==
In March 2017, the Bangalore Metro Rail Corporation Limited (BMRCL) sought bids for building the S.G. Palya (Suddagunte Palya) metro station on the 7.5 km Kalena Agrahara - South Ramp section of the 21.25 km Pink Line of Namma Metro. This section comprises 5 stations, excluding Jayadeva Hospital, which was part of a joint venture between HCC - URC Constructions. Initially, Simplex Infrastructures won the tender in September 2017 but due to slow progress, their contract was terminated. In July 2021, GR Infraprojects became the lowest bidder and was awarded the Rs 364.87 Crore contract for this section. They commenced the construction of this metro station as per the agreement.

== Station layout ==
G	Street level	Exit/Entrance
L1	Mezzanine	Fare control, station agent, Metro Card vending machines, crossover
L2	Side platform | Doors will open on the left
L2	Platform 2 Southbound	Towards → Kalena Agrahara; Next Station: Jayadeva Hospital; Change at the next station for Yellow Line
L2	Platform 1 Northbound	Towards ← Train Terminates Here ** Next Station: Dairy Circle
L2	Side platform | Doors will open on the left
L2	Note:	** To be further extended to Nagawara in the future

== See also ==
- Bengaluru
- List of Namma Metro stations
- Transport in Karnataka
- List of metro systems
- List of rapid transit systems in India
- Bengaluru Metropolitan Transport Corporation
