= Jayadeva Hospital metro station =

Namma Metro's Yellow Line and Pink Line interchange metro station

Jayadeva Hospital
- Station board as of November 2026

General information
- Location: Jayadeva Junction, BHBCS Layout, BTM Layout Stage 2, Bengaluru, Karnataka 560076
- Coordinates: 12.916744°N 77.600117°E
- System: Namma Metro station
- Owner: Bangalore Metro Rail Corporation Ltd (BMRCL)
- Operator: Namma Metro
- Line: Yellow Line Pink Line
- Platforms: 2 side platforms 2 side platforms
- Tracks: 4

Construction
- Structure type: Elevated
- Platform levels: 4
- Accessible: Yes
- Architect: HCC - URC Construction JV

Other information
- Status: Operational and staffed
- Station code: JDHP

History
- Opened: 10 August 2025; 15 months ago 13 November 2026; 3 days ago (Inaugural run); 14 November 2026; 2 days ago (Commercial)
- Electrified: 750 V DC third rail

Services
Preceding station	Namma Metro	Following station
Ragigudda towards Rashtreeya Vidyalaya Road	Yellow Line	BTM Layout towards Delta Electronics Bommasandra
S.G. Palya (Suddagunte Palya) Terminus	Pink Line (Partially Operational)	N.S. Palya - JP Nagar 4th Phase towards Kalena Agrahara
S.G. Palya (Suddagunte Palya) towards Nagawara	Pink Line (Operational around March 2027)	N.S. Palya - JP Nagar 4th Phase towards Kalena Agrahara
Route map
Location

Jayadeva Hospital is a double-elevated interchange metro station on the north-south corridor of the Yellow Line and the Pink Line of Namma Metro in Bengaluru, India. This metro station is the first multi-elevated interchange station in the Namma Metro network. The station is named after the Sri Jayadeva Institute of Cardiovascular Sciences and Research which is located nearby and serves MICO Layout in BTM Layout 2nd Stage, KEB Layout and New Gurappanapalya in BTM Layout 1st Stage, Jayanagar 9th Block, JP Nagar 3rd Phase.

== History ==
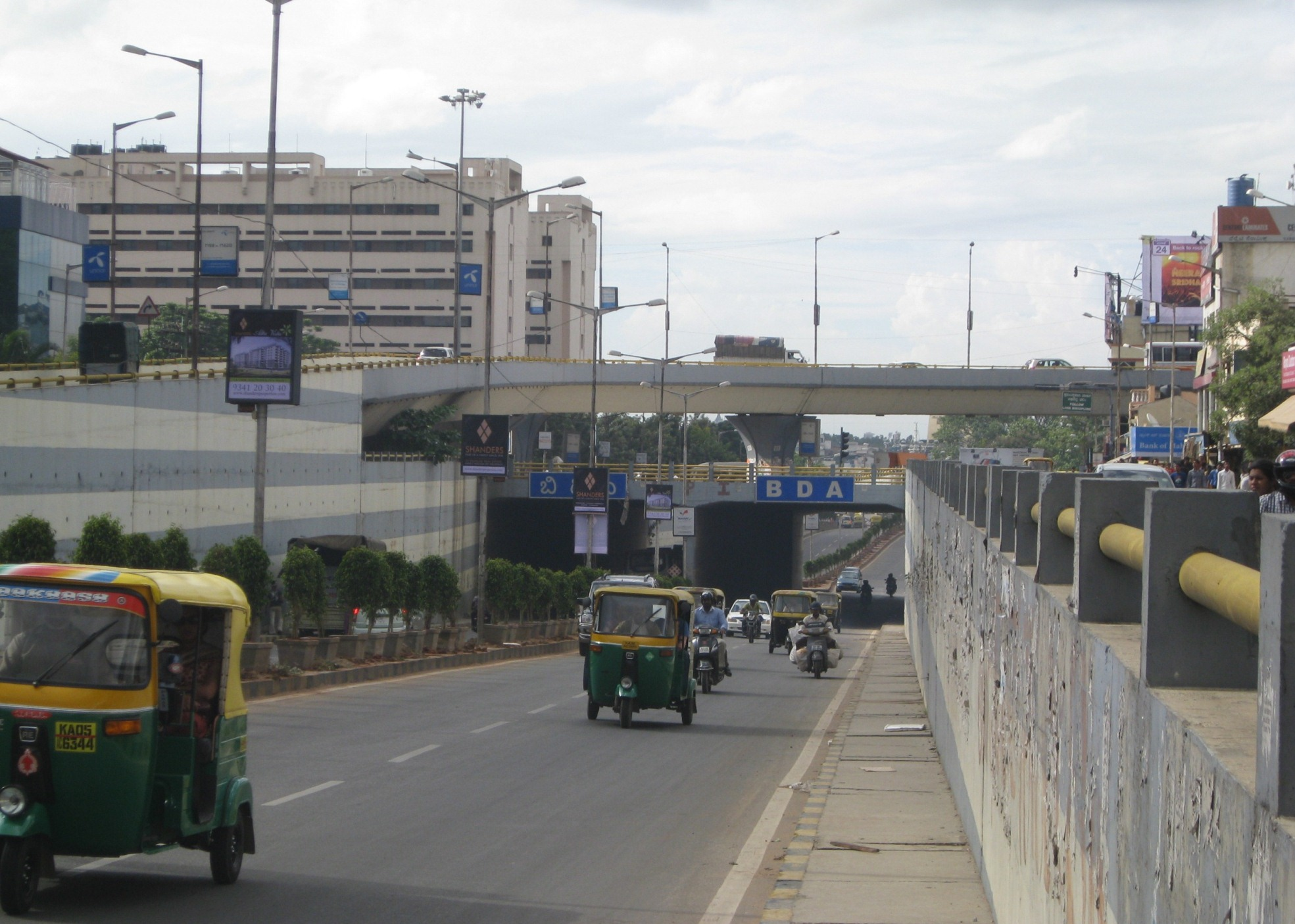
Jayadeva flyover which was demolished to build the station

This metro station was built by demolishing the 15 year old Jayadeva flyover in 2020.

=== Yellow Line ===
In December 2016, the Bangalore Metro Rail Corporation Limited (BMRCL) issued a call for bids to construct the Jayadeva Hospital metro station along the 6.340 km Reach 5 – Package 3 section (Central Silk Board - Rashtreeya Vidyalaya Road) of the 18.825 km Yellow Line of Namma Metro. On 16 May 2017, HCC-URC Cementation JV was selected as the lowest bidder for this stretch, with their bid closely aligning with the original cost estimates. Consequently, the contract was successfully awarded to the company, which then commenced construction of the metro station in accordance with the agreements.

The Yellow Line began operations from 10 August 2025 and has been officially inaugurated by Prime Minister Narendra Modi, with four trainsets which are ready for operations after arriving from Titagarh Rail Systems in Kolkata. The opening was delayed from May 2025 as previously announced by the Namma Metro Managing Director, Maheshwar Rao.

=== Pink Line ===
As per the latest updates, this metro station, which covers a total distance of 7.5 km elevated stretch (Kalena Agrahara - S.G. Palya (Suddagunte Palya)), was inaugurated by the honorable Prime Minister Narendra Modi on 13 November 2026.

== Passenger services ==
Jayadeva Hospital metro station Entry/Exits (A-L)

There are 12 Entry/Exit points – A to L, making the highest number of entry/exits points for this metro station under Namma Metro with wheelchair accessibility via lift at 'B','E','H', and 'K'. Escalator access is also available at 'A','D','G', and 'J'. Service road access is available on all sides except Jayadeva hospital side.

- Entry/Exit points A to C: Towards Jayadeva Hospital/Jayanagar side
- Entry/Exit points D to F: Towards BTM Layout 1st Stage side
- Entry/Exit points G to I: Towards BTM Layout 2nd Stage side
- Entry Exit points J to L: Towards JP Nagar 3rd Phase side

=== Station layout ===
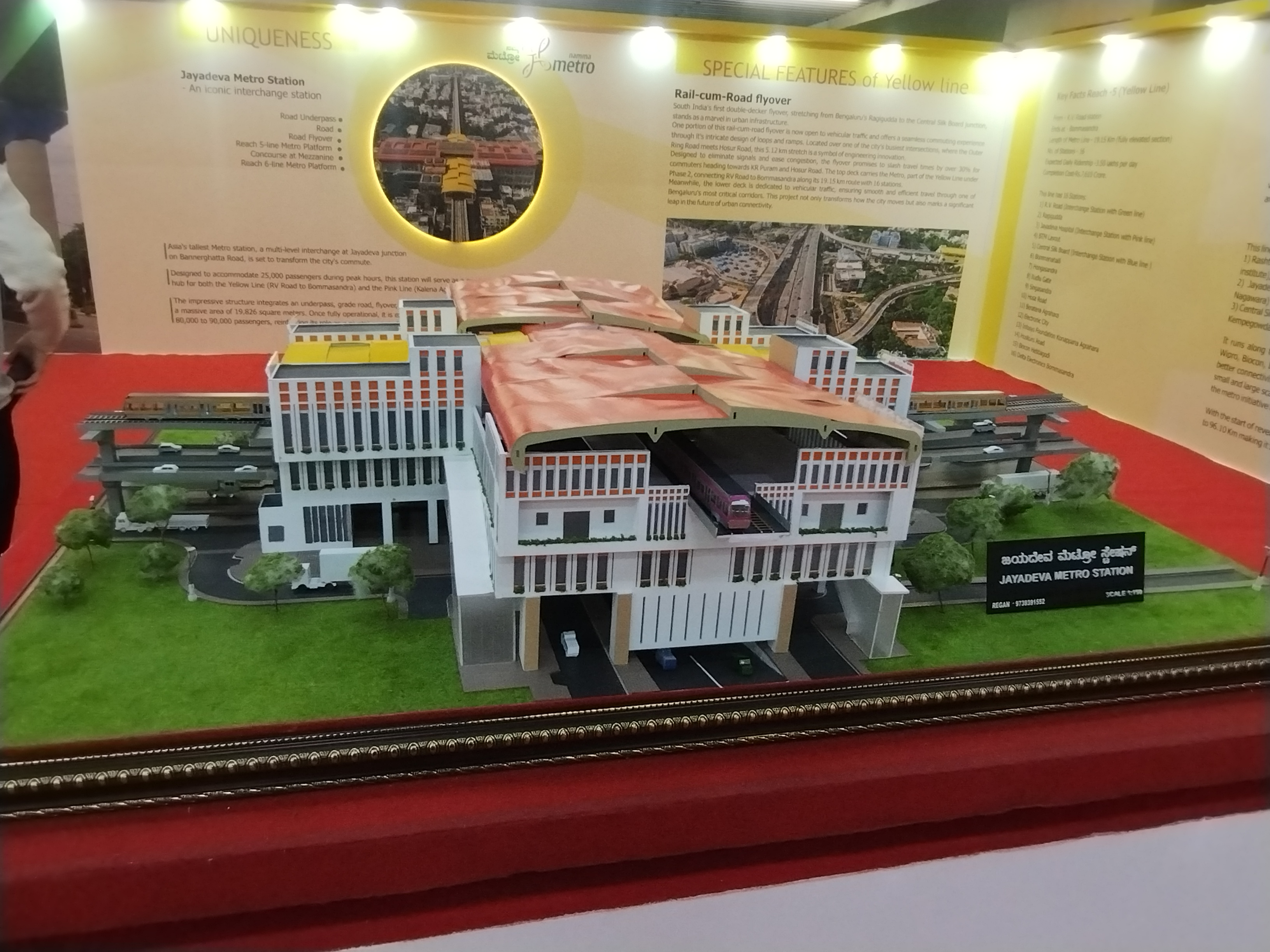
Miniature Model of this metro station during the Yellow Line inauguration at Ragigudda, Bengaluru (2025)

This metro station currently consists of five levels from underground to the top level as given below:

- Level 1 → Underpass connecting Bilekahalli and Dairy Circle (Bannerghatta Road)
- Level 2 → Street Level road (Marenahalli / Outer Ring Road)
- Level 3 → Elevated Flyover from Ragigudda to Central Silk Board
- Level 4 → Concourse (Mezzanine)
- Level 5 → Yellow Line Platforms
- Level 6 → Pink Line Platforms

UG	Underpass level	Bilekahalli - Dairy Circle Underpass
G	Street level	Exit/Entrance
L1	Flyover	Ragigudda - Silk Board Flyover
L2	Mezzanine	Automatic Fare Collection gates, station agent, crossover
L3	Side platform | Doors will open on the left
L3	Platform 2 Eastbound	Towards → Delta Electronics Bommasandra; Next Station: BTM Layout
L3	Platform 1 Westbound	Towards ← Rashtreeya Vidyalaya Road; Next Station: Ragigudda
L3	Side platform | Doors will open on the left
L4	Side platform | Doors will open on the left
L4	Platform 4 Southbound	Towards → Kalena Agrahara; Next Station: N.S. Palya - JP Nagar 4th Phase; Change at the next station for Orange Line ** (U/C)
L4	Platform 3 Northbound	Towards ← S.G. Palya (Suddagunte Palya) **
L4	Side platform | Doors will open on the left Pink Line Station Layout & Platform Numbers - (TBC)
L4	Note:	** To be further extended to Nagawara in the future

== Gallery ==
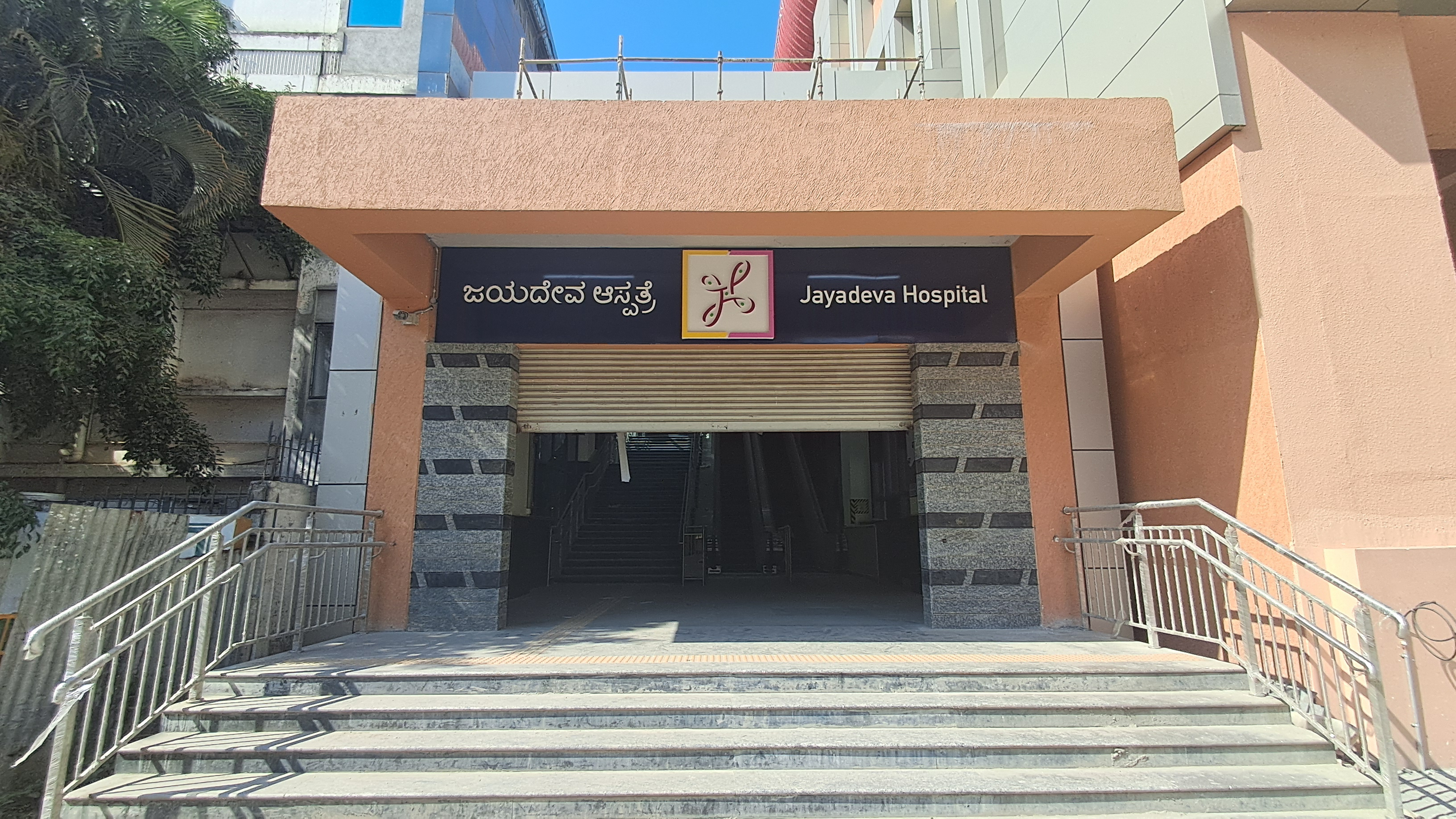
Entrance 'A' with lift access on Jayadeva Hospital side

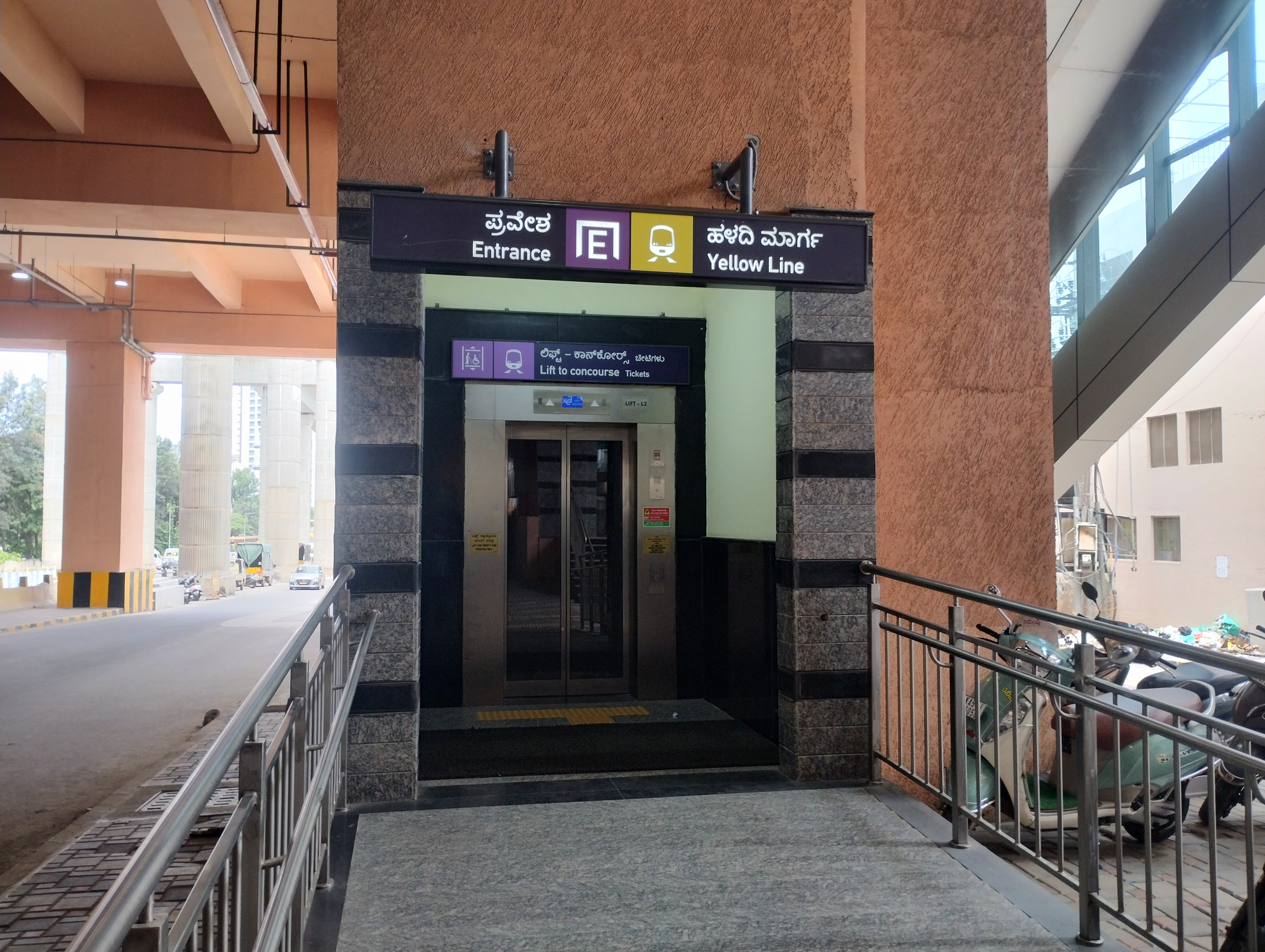
Entrance 'E' with lift access on BTM 1st stage side

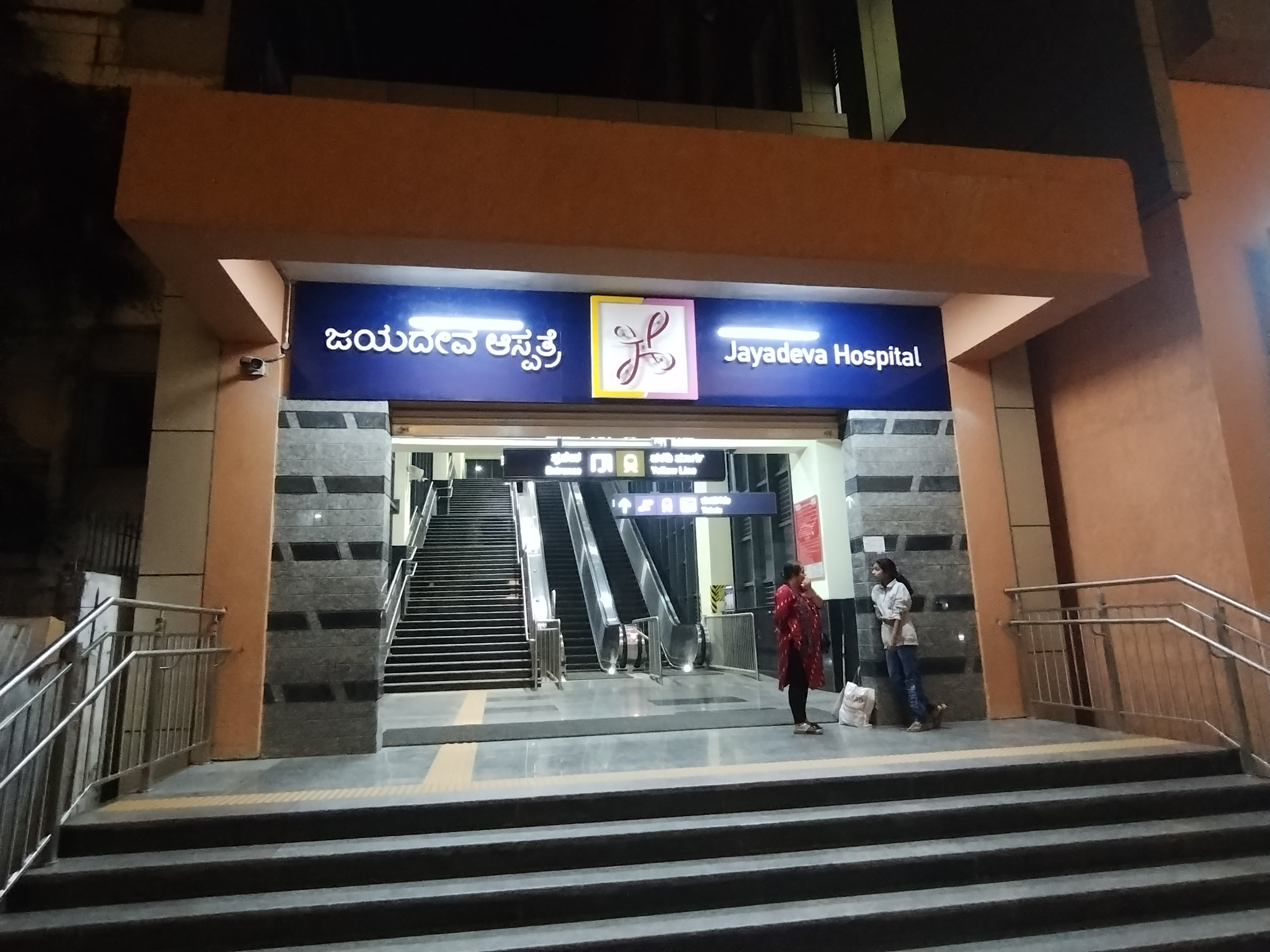
Station entrance 'J' on JP Nagar 3rd phase side

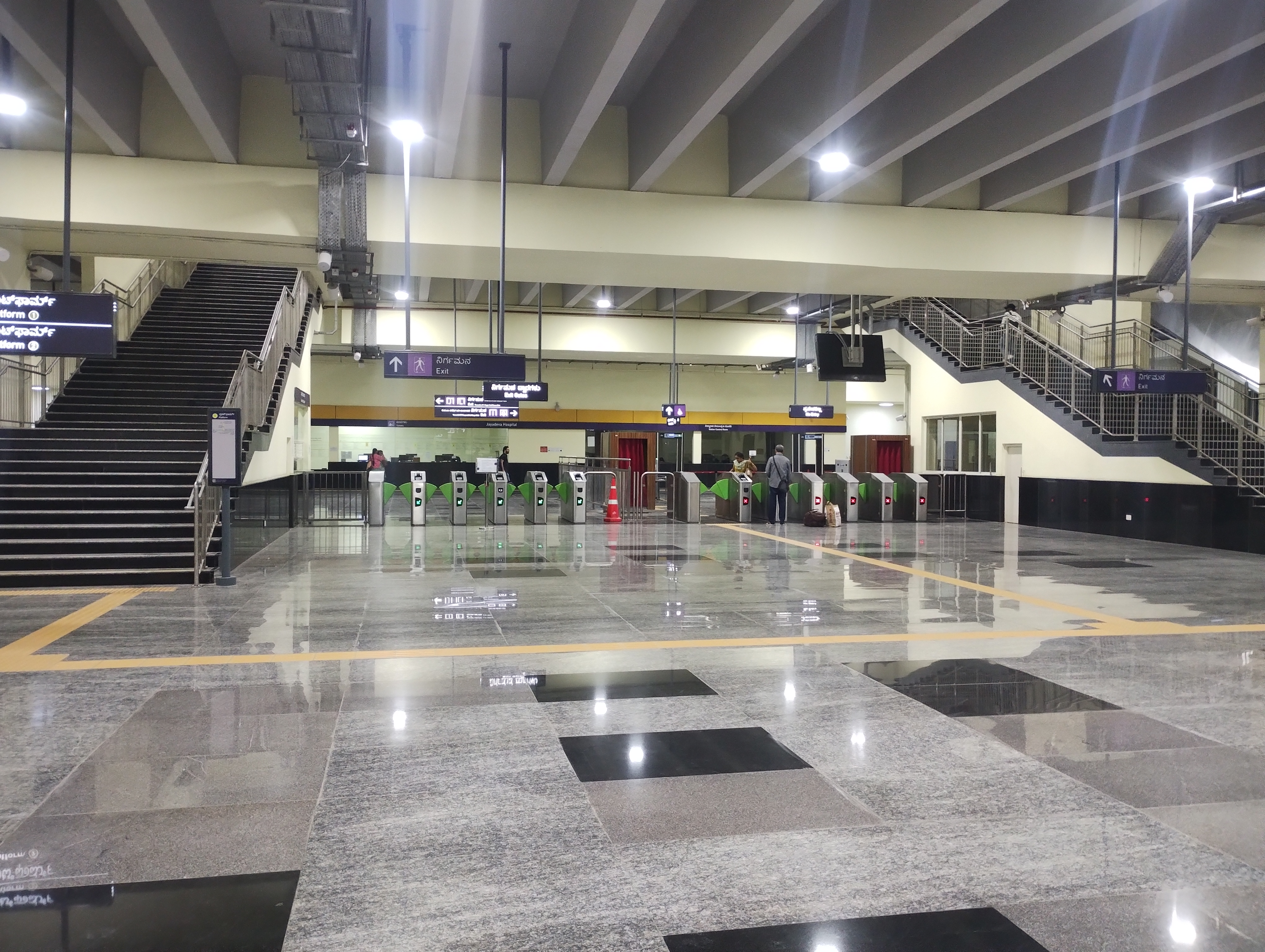
Interior view of concourse on southern side

== See also ==
- Bengaluru
- List of Namma Metro stations
- Transport in Karnataka
- List of metro systems
- List of rapid transit systems in India
