= Ragigudda - Silk Board Flyover =

Flyover under construction in Bengaluru

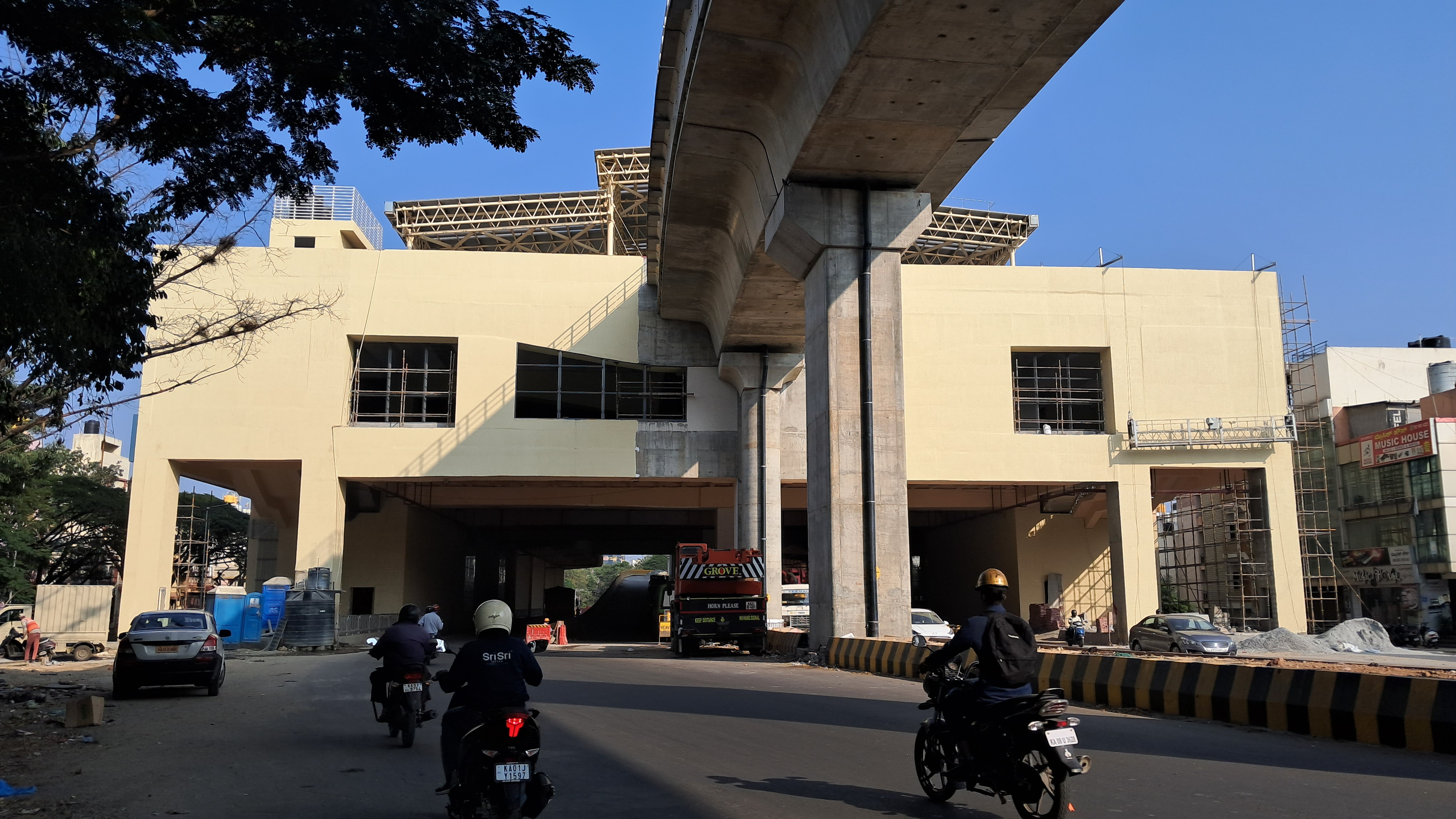
- Starting point of the Ragigudda - Silk Board Flyover
- Interactive map of Ragigudda - Silk Board Flyover

Location
- Bangalore, India
- Coordinates: 12.91690°N 77.59038°E
- Roads at junction: Marenahalli Road; Outer Ring Road; 100 Feet Ring Road

Construction
- Type: Double-Stacked Overpass
- Lanes: 4
- Constructed: by HCC - URC Construction JV
- Opened: 17 July 2024; 2 years ago
- Maximum height: 31 m (102 ft)

Ragigudda - Silk Board Flyover is a rail-cum-road flyover in the city of Bengaluru in Karnataka, India. It is the first double decker flyover in Bengaluru, which was built by the Bangalore Metro Rail Corporation Limited between Central Silk Board and Ragigudda metro stations as part of the Yellow Line (Rashtreeya Vidyalaya Road-Delta Electronics Bommasandra). After completion, it has become the first rail-cum-road flyover in South India, which was completed by 2026..On 22nd April 2026 another section of road was open to public on trial basis.

== Silk Board Junction ==
The Silk Board Junction will have 5 flyovers in addition with the existing one.

- Ramp A: From Ragigudda to Hosur Road
- Ramp B: From BTM Layout to Outer Ring Road (HSR Layout) / Hosur Road
- Ramp C: Down Ramp from Ragigudda / BTM Layout to Outer Ring Road (HSR Layout)
- Ramp D: From HSR Layout to Ragigudda
- Ramp E: Down Ramp from HSR Layout to BTM Layout

== Overview ==
The flyover has two levels above ground, with the first level having four lanes for carrying vehicles while the second level carries the metro tracks. The total length of the flyover is 3.2 kilometres long. At 31 metres tall, it is tallest rail-cum-road flyover in South India.
