= BTM Layout metro station =

Namma Metro's Yellow Line metro station

BTM Layout
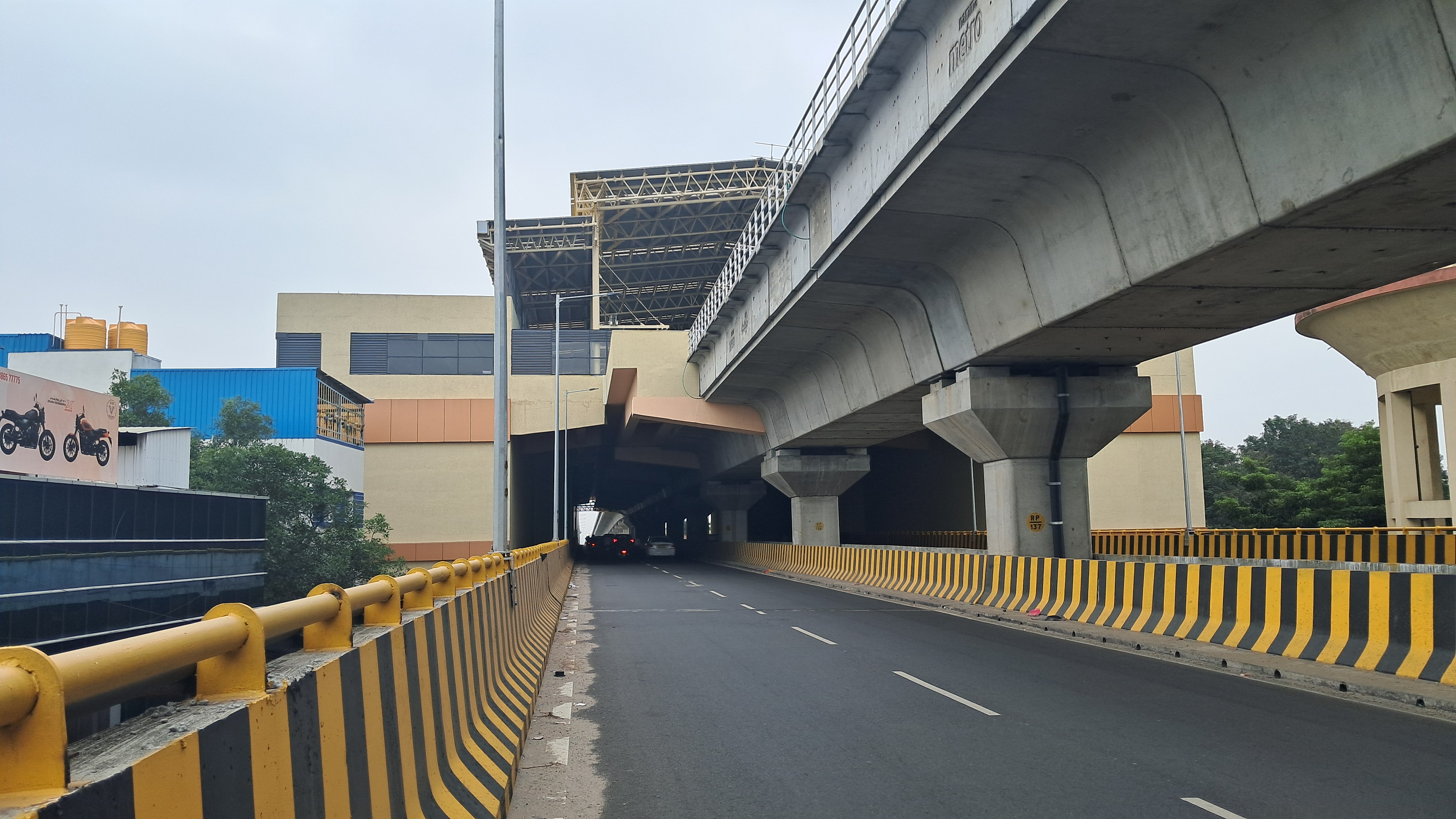
- Final stages of construction from Ragigudda - Central Silk Board Flyover

General information
- Location: Marenahalli/Outer Ring Road, BTM Layout, Bengaluru, Karnataka 560076
- Coordinates: 12.91656°N 77.60825°E
- System: Namma Metro station
- Owner: Bangalore Metro Rail Corporation Ltd (BMRCL)
- Operator: Namma Metro
- Line: Yellow Line
- Platforms: Side platform Platform-1 → Rashtreeya Vidyalaya Road; Platform-2 → Delta Electronics Bommasandra
- Tracks: 2

Construction
- Structure type: Elevated, Double track
- Platform levels: 3
- Parking: Two-Wheeler Parking only
- Accessible: Yes
- Architect: HCC - URC Construction JV

Other information
- Status: Operational and Staffed
- Station code: BTML

History
- Opened: 10 August 2025; 12 months ago
- Electrified: 750 V DC third rail

Services
Preceding station	Namma Metro	Following station
Jayadeva Hospital towards Rashtreeya Vidyalaya Road	Yellow Line	Central Silk Board towards Delta Electronics Bommasandra
Route map
Location

BTM Layout is an elevated metro station on the North-South corridor of the Yellow Line of Namma Metro in Bengaluru, India.

== History ==
In December 2016, the Bangalore Metro Rail Corporation Limited (BMRCL) issued a call for bids to construct the BTM Layout metro station along the 6.340 km Reach 5 – Package 3 section (Central Silk Board - Rashtreeya Vidyalaya Road) of the 18.825 km Yellow Line of Namma Metro. On 16 May 2017, HCC-URC Construction JV was selected as the lowest bidder for this stretch, with their bid closely aligning with the original cost estimates. Consequently, the contract was successfully awarded to the joint venture, which then commenced construction of the metro station in accordance with the agreements.

The Yellow Line began operations from 10 August 2025 and has been officially inaugurated by Prime Minister Narendra Modi, with four trainsets which are ready for operations after arriving from Titagarh Rail Systems in Kolkata. The opening was delayed from May 2025 as previously announced by the Namma Metro Managing Director, Maheshwar Rao.

== Station layout ==
G	Street level	Exit/Entrance
L1	Mezzanine	Fare control, station agent, Metro Card vending machines, crossover
L2	Side platform | Doors will open on the left
L2	Platform 2 Eastbound	Towards → Delta Electronics Bommasandra; Next Station: Central Silk Board; Change at the next station for Blue Line
L2	Platform 1 Westbound	Towards ← Rashtreeya Vidyalaya Road; Next Station: Jayadeva Hospital; Change at the next station for Pink Line
L2	Side platform | Doors will open on the left
L2

== Entry/Exits ==
There are two entry/exit points – A and B. Commuters can use either of the points for their travel.

Exit A leads to BTM Layout 1st Stage Side, Whereas Exit B Leads to BTM Layout 2nd Stage Side.

== See also ==
- Bengaluru
- List of Namma Metro stations
- Transport in Karnataka
- List of metro systems
- List of rapid transit systems in India
