= Jayanagar metro station =

Namma Metro's Green Line metro station

Jayanagar
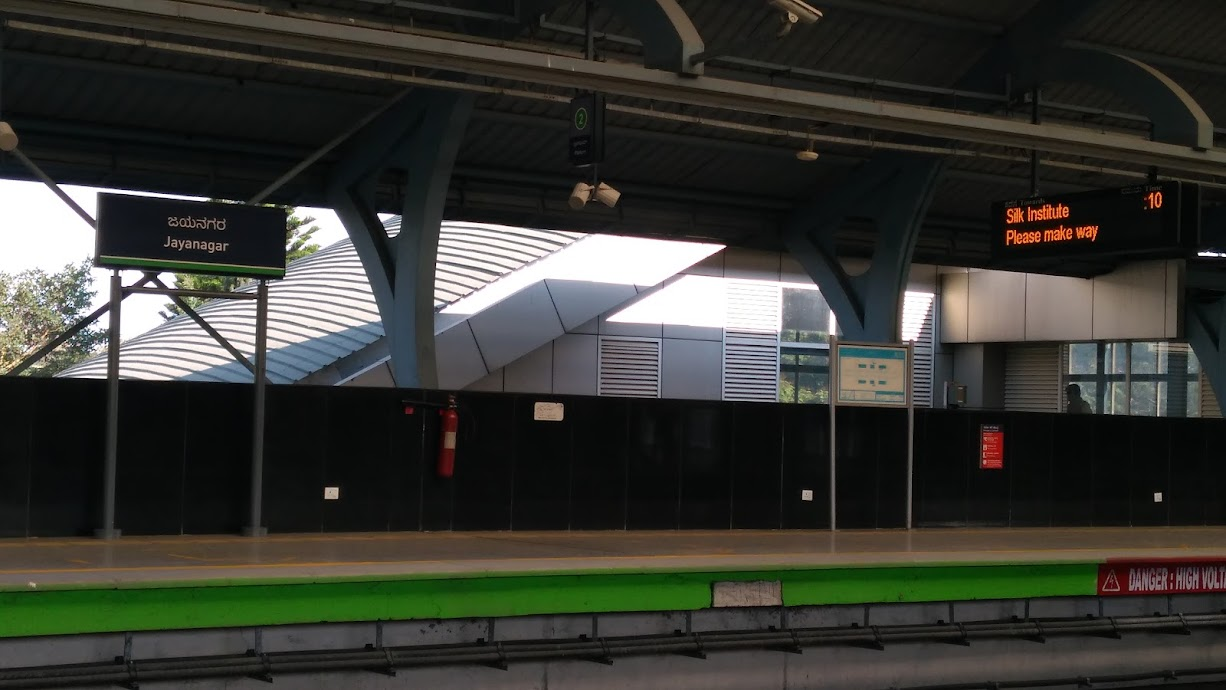
- This metro station leading to Silk Institute

General information
- Other names: Jayanagara
- Location: Rashtreeya Vidyalaya Rd, Jayanagar 4th Block, Bengaluru, Karnataka 560041
- Coordinates: 12.938237°N 77.580076°E
- System: Namma Metro station
- Owner: Bangalore Metro Rail Corporation Ltd (BMRCL)
- Operator: Namma Metro
- Line: Green Line
- Platforms: Side platform Platform-1 → Madavara From Nov 7 Platform-2 → Silk Institute
- Tracks: 2
- Connections: Jayanagara TTMC

Construction
- Structure type: Elevated, Double track
- Platform levels: 2
- Parking: Available
- Accessible: Yes
- Architect: IVRCL Ltd.

Other information
- Status: Staffed
- Station code: JYN

History
- Opened: 18 June 2017; 9 years ago
- Electrified: 750 V DC third rail

Services
Preceding station	Namma Metro	Following station
South End Circle towards Madavara	Green Line	Rashtreeya Vidyalaya Road towards Silk Institute
Route map
Location

Jayanagar is an elevated metro station on the North-South corridor of the Green Line of Namma Metro serving the 4th and 7th block of Rashtreeya Vidyalaya Road area of Bengaluru, India. It was opened to the public on 18 June 2017.

== Station layout ==
G	Street level	Exit/Entrance
L1	Mezzanine	Fare control, station agent, Metro Card vending machines, crossover
L2	Side platform | Doors will open on the left
L2	Platform 2 Southbound	Towards → Silk Institute; Next Station: Rashtreeya Vidyalaya Road; Change at the next station for Yellow Line
L2	Platform 1 Northbound	Towards ← Madavara; Next Station: South End Circle
L2	Side platform | Doors will open on the left
L2

== Entry/Exits ==
There are 2 Entry/Exit points – A and B. Commuters can use either of the points for their travel.

- Entry/Exit point A: Towards Jayanagar 4th Block side with lift accessibility
- Entry/Exit point B: Towards Jayanagar 7th Block side (Yediyur)

== See also ==
- Bengaluru
- List of Namma Metro stations
- Transport in Karnataka
- List of metro systems
- List of rapid transit systems in India
