= Hulimavu metro station =

Namma Metro's Pink Line metro station

Hulimavu
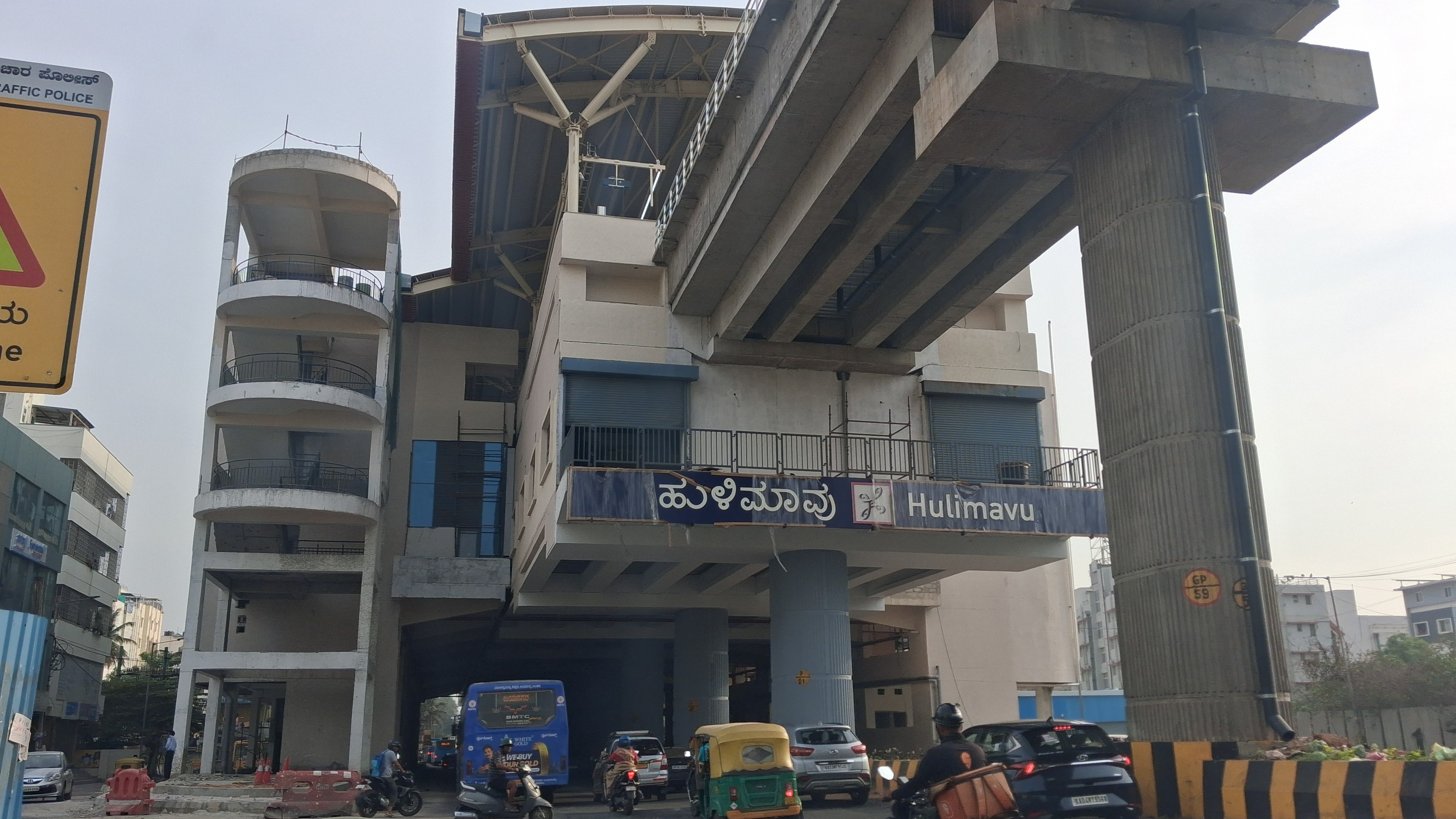
- This metro station's final stages before Operations under Namma Metro's Pink Line as of April 2026

General information
- Location: Hulimavu gate, Bannerghatta Main road, Bengaluru, Karnataka 560076
- Coordinates: 12.88108°N 77.59579°E
- System: Namma Metro
- Owner: Bengaluru Metro Rail Corporation Ltd (BMRCL)
- Operator: Namma Metro
- Line: Pink Line
- Platforms: Side platform Platform-1 → S.G. Palya (Suddagunte Palya) * Platform-2 → Kalena Agrahara * (Further extension to Nagawara in the future)
- Tracks: 2

Construction
- Structure type: Elevated, Double track
- Platform levels: 2
- Parking: (TBC)
- Accessible: Yes
- Architect: GR Infraprojects Ltd. (Simplex contract terminated in 2021)

Other information
- Status: Staffed and Operational
- Station code: (TBC)

History
- Opened: 13 November 2026; 1 day ago (Inaugural run); 14 November 2026; 0 days ago (Commercial)
- Electrified: 750 V DC third rail

Services
Preceding station	Namma Metro	Following station
Bilekahalli-I.I.M.B towards S.G. Palya (Suddagunte Palya)	Pink Line (Partially Operational)	Kalena Agrahara Terminus
Bilekahalli-I.I.M.B towards Nagawara	Pink Line (Operational around March 2027)	Kalena Agrahara Terminus
Route map
Location

Hulimavu is an elevated metro station on the North-South corridor of the Pink Line of Namma Metro in Bengaluru, India. This metro station serves mainly the Christ University (Bannerghatta Road), and the nearby prime locations such as Royal Meenakshi Mall, Sri Meenakshi Sundareshwara Temple, Hulimavu Police Station and Kothanur Metro Depot, which will handle all the Pink Line train sets for maintenance purposes.

As per the latest updates, this metro station, which covers a total distance of 7.5 km elevated stretch (Kalena Agrahara - S.G. Palya (Suddagunte Palya)), was inaugurated by the honorable Prime Minister Narendra Modi on 13 November 2026.

== History ==
In March 2017, the Bangalore Metro Rail Corporation Limited (BMRCL) sought bids for building the Hulimavu metro station on the 7.5 km Kalena Agrahara - South Ramp section of the 21.25 km Pink Line of Namma Metro. This section comprises 5 stations, excluding Jayadeva Hospital, which was part of a joint venture between HCC - URC Constructions. Initially, Simplex Infrastructures won the tender in September 2017 but due to slow progress, their contract was terminated. In July 2021, GR Infraprojects became the lowest bidder and was awarded the Rs 364.87 Crore contract for this section. They commenced the construction of this metro station as per the agreement.

== Station layout ==
G	Street level	Exit/Entrance
L1	Mezzanine	Fare control, station agent, Metro Card vending machines, crossover
L2	Side platform | Doors will open on the left
L2	Platform 2 Southbound	Towards → Kalena Agrahara
L2	Platform 1 Northbound	Towards ← S.G. Palya (Suddagunte Palya) ** Next Station: Bilekahalli-I.I.M.B
L2	Side platform | Doors will open on the left
L2	Note:	** To be further extended to Nagawara in the future

== See also ==
- Bengaluru
- List of Namma Metro stations
- Transport in Karnataka
- List of metro systems
- List of rapid transit systems in India
- Bengaluru Metropolitan Transport Corporation
