= Yellow Line (Namma Metro) =

Line of Bengaluru's Namma Metro

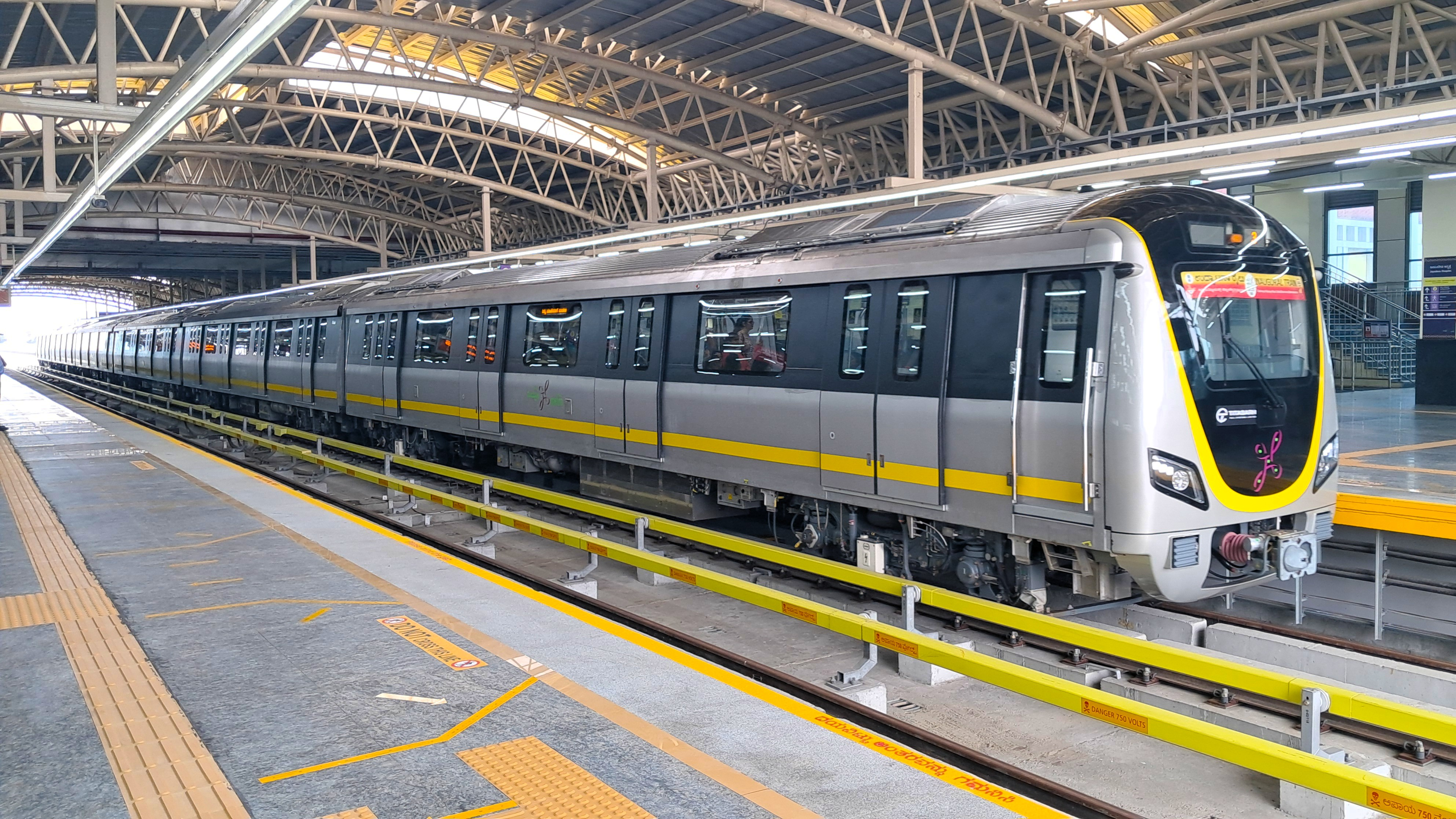
- This trainset on standby at Jayadeva Hospital metro station and heading towards Rashtreeya Vidyalaya Road metro station

Overview
- Other name: Rashtreeya Vidyalaya Road–Bommasandra Line
- Native name: ಹಳದಿ ಮಾರ್ಗ (Haḷadi mārga)
- Status: Operational
- Owner: Bangalore Metro Rail Corporation Limited (BMRCL)
- Locale: Bengaluru, Karnataka, India
- Termini: Rashtreeya Vidyalaya Road; Delta Electronics Bommasandra
- Connecting lines: Operational (2): Green Line; Pink Line; Upcoming (1): Blue Line
- Stations: 16
- Website: bmrc.co.in

Service
- Type: Metro
- System: Namma Metro
- Depot: Hebbagodi
- Rolling stock: parts of train manufactured by CRRC Nanjing Puzhen assembled by Titagarh Rail Systems

History
- Work began: 2017
- Opened: 10 August 2025; 15 months ago

Technical
- Line length: 19.15 km (11.90 mi)
- Num of tracks: 2
- Character: Elevated
- Track gauge: 1,435 mm (4 ft 8 1/2 in) standard gauge
- Electrification: 750 V DC third rail
- Signalling: CBTC Signalling System

The Yellow Line is a line on the Namma Metro rail system. As of 2025, the line is 19.15 km (11.90 mi) long, connecting Rashtreeya Vidyalaya Road with Bommasandra, and is fully elevated with 16 stations. The line passes through the neighbourhoods of South Bengaluru, such as Jayanagar, Ragigudda, BTM Layout, Central Silk Board and runs parallel to Hosur Road where it passes through neighbourhoods such as Bommanahalli, Hongasandra, Electronic City and Bommasandra. The line interchanges with the Green Line at Rashtreeya Vidyalaya Road, and Pink Line at Jayadeva Hospital and has an upcoming interchange with the Blue Line at Central Silk Board.

The Yellow Line was officially inaugurated on 10 August 2025 by the Prime Minister Narendra Modi, with the line opening for public use on the following day at IIIT-Bangalore.

Inauguration of Yellow Line at Ragigudda metro station, in 2026

== History ==
In the late 2000s and early 2010s, traffic began to grow in the Outer Ring Road in Bangalore and there was a lack of connection from the northern suburbs of Bangalore to the southeastern industrial zones. In 2009, BMRCL planned to build a line in the southern end of the city to connect it to the industrial areas of Bommasandra and Electronic City. In 2012, BMRCL submitted the Phase 2 of Namma Metro which included a 72.095 km (44.798 mi) metro expansion of the existing metro lines and the construction of two new lines from Bannerghatta Road to Nagawara and from RV Road to Bommasandra. The lines were later named the Yellow Line and Pink Line, and BMRCL explored the option of developing them as a public-private partnership project, but these plans were later abandoned. The project received approval from the Central Government in January 2014.

== Funding ==
For Phase 2 of the Namma Metro, the Central and State Governments will fund around ₹15,000 crore. The State and Central Governments will bear 30% and 20% of the project cost respectively. The remaining will be obtained through senior term loans. BMRCL is permitted to raise up to ₹9,000 crore through loans.

Indian firms Biocon and Infosys announced that they would fund construction of the Biocon Hebbagodi and Infosys Foundation Konappana Agrahara metro stations respectively on the Yellow Line. Each firm contributed ₹100 crore (US$11 million) towards the project. Biocon CMD Kiran Mazumdar Shaw stated that the company wanted to fund the project because it would help de-congest the city. Both Biocon and Infosys have offices and facilities located near the stations.

== Planning ==
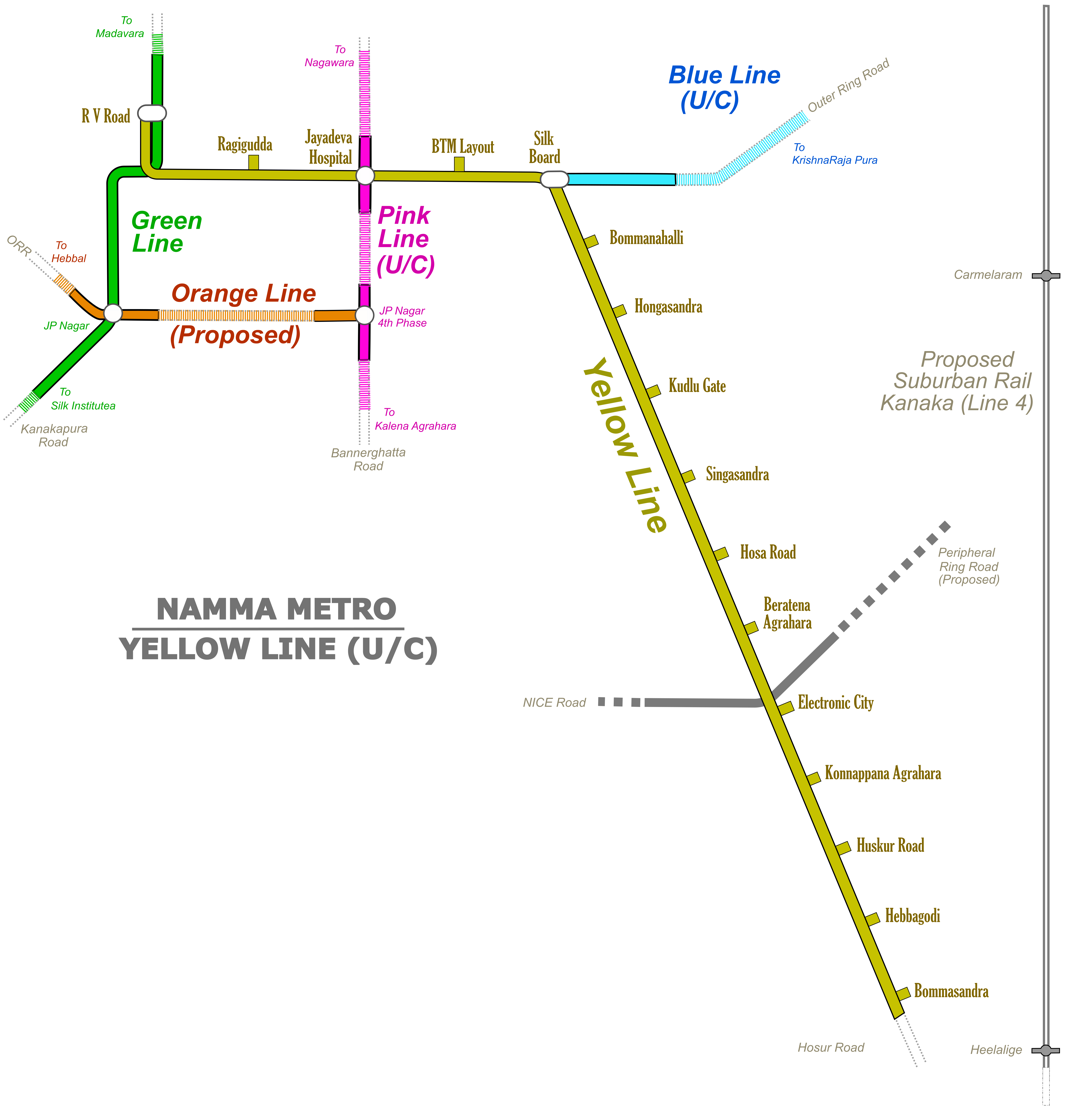
On June 14, 2016, PM Narendra Modi laid the foundation for the line, with BMRCL releasing the first tender for the line from Bommasandra to Hosa Road on 9 December 2016. BMRCL floated civil work tenders in three packages. The work involves the construction of a viaduct with five stations, and includes the construction of the depot entry line leading to Hebbagodi Depot. Tenders for the 6.385 km (3.967 mi) stretch from Hosa Road to Bommanahalli (previously HSR Layout) were floated the next day. Both packages were awarded to Thai-based ITD Cementation India in May 2017 for ₹511.35 and 485.52 crores (US$140 mil in total). Civil works began in November 2017. The third tender for construction of the 6.34 km (3.939 mi) elevated section and five stations was awarded to a joint venture between Hindustan Construction Company (HCC) and URC Construction Pvt Ltd. on 3 July 2017 for ₹797.29 crore (US$85 million). BMRCL began the land acquisition process in early 2017 and civil works started in November 2017. BMRCL awarded the construction of the Hebbagodi Depot to Parnika Commercial & Estates in July 2019 while simultaneously preparing the tender for rolling stock. BMRCL received bids from CRRC, Bombardier, Alstom India, and BEML. CRRC's total bid cost was ₹100 crores less than BMRCL estimates and over ₹175 crores cheaper than the next lowest bid. The firm placed a bid of ₹7.31 crores per coach, compared to BEML ₹9.28 crores per coach. However, later with escalating tensions between India and China, BEML offered a to re-negotiate a new price with BMRCL if the firm was willing to as India was considering minimizing its business ties with China, which never materialized.

=== Bidding ===
Pre Construction Activity & Civil Work
Tendering	Section	Length	Successful bid/cost	Contractor	Award
Reach-5/2016/Demolition/DLN-3RT	RV Road to Hongasandra		₹3.64 crore (US$390,000)	B R Chawla Demolition	23 Feb 2016
Reach-5/2015/ Demolition/DLN-4	Hongasandra to Bommasandra		₹3.82 crore (US$410,000)	B R Chawla Demolition	25 Jan 2016
Reach 5/P1/Via & Stn/2016/12	Bommasandra to Hosa Road	6.418 km (3.988 mi)	₹485.52 crore (US$52 million)	ITD-ITD Cem JV	25 Mar 2017
Reach 5/P2/Via & Stn/2016/13	Hosa Road to Bommanahalli	6.385 km (3.967 mi)	₹511.35 crore (US$55 million)	ITD-ITD Cem JV	25 Apr 2017
Reach 5/P3/Via & Stn/2016/18	Bommanahalli to RV Road	6.340 km (3.939 mi)	₹797.29 crore (US$85 million)	HCC-URC JV	16 May 2017
Total		19.143 km (11.895 mi)	₹1,801.62 crore (US$190 million)		
Architectural Finishing Works
Package	Section		Successful bid/cost	Contractor	Award
R5(P1&P2)/Arch.Works/STN/2020/64	Bommanahalli to Bommasandra		₹92.89 crore (US$9.9 million)	Godrej & Boyce	02 Nov 2020
R5(P3)/Arch.Works/STN/2021/80	RV Road to Central Silk Board		₹67.13 crore (US$7.2 million)	MR Constructions	05 Jan 2022
Total			₹160.02 crore (US$17 million)		
Miscellaneous
Package	Contract		Successful bid/cost	Contractor	Award
Land Acquisition			₹1,843 crore (US$200 million)	N/A	2017
Phase-2/ICB No. 1RS-C	UTO Consultancy		₹1.94 crore (US$210,000)	Systra – Systra MVA	17 Dec 2020
Reach 5/Hebbagodi Depot/2019/43	Hebbagodi Depot		₹170.00 crore (US$18 million)	Parnika Commercial & Estates	28 July 2019
Horti Hebbagodi/RT01/2025/127	Hebbagodi Depot finishing works		₹0.47 crore (US$50,000)	Chaithra Sourabha	3 June 2025
Phase-II/ ICB No. 8 S&T-DM	CBTC signalling		₹247.71 crore (US$26 million)	Siemens	02 Dec 2019
Phase-2/ICB No. 4 RS-DM	Rolling stock (90 Coaches)		₹657.90 crore (US$70 million)	CRRC - Titagarh	20 Feb 2020
5RS-DM	Rolling stock (36 Coaches)		₹414 crore (US$44 million)	BEML	03 Dec 2025
Phase-II/E&M-3	Electrical and Mechanical		₹85.78 crore (US$9.2 million)	Jakson – JSC JV	07 Jan 2021
Phase-2/60E1 880 Grade Rails/RT01/2020/68	Track Work		₹17.98 crore (US$1.9 million)	Jindal Steel	12 Jan 2021
Phase II/ICB No. 4 ELEV-DM	Elevators		₹17.83 crore (US$1.9 million)	Johnson Lifts	03 Feb 2021
Phase II/ICB No.EP4-CC	750V DC Third Rail electrification		₹146.88 crore (US$16 million)	Linxon India	06 Feb 2021
Phase II/ICB No.7 ESCAL - DM	Elevated Station Escalators		₹85.75 crore (US$9.2 million)	Schindler India	2 June 2021
Reach-5/Median Safety Grills/2023/100	Fabrication and Installation of Median Safety Grills		₹4.53 crore (US$480,000)	Srinivas Construction	28 Feb 2024
O&M/HR/HKS/R5/2023/1	Housekeeping, Services, Supply of Machinery		₹22.16 crore (US$2.4 million)	Civic International Social Service	20 Aug 2024
Phase-2/Reach-5/Road Work/2025/128	Road Works		₹7.80 crore (US$830,000)	ANU Constructions	2 May 2025
Total			₹3,723.73 crore (US$400 million)		
Total line cost			₹5,685.37 crore (US$610 million)		

== Infrastructure ==
=== Rolling stock ===
BMRC operates driverless trains on the Yellow Line with a communications-based train control (CBTC) signaling system. On 2 December 2019, BMRC awarded a contract for supplying 90 coaches (15 rakes) to CRRC Nanjing Puzhen Co. Ltd with CBTC signaling for the Yellow Line. CRRC entered into a partnership with Titagarh Rail Systems Limited (TRSL) to meet the requirement of at least 75% of the coaches to be made in India. As a result, only one prototype train set was manufactured in China. The prototype arrived at the Hebbagodi depot on February 14, 2024. The trainset underwent rigorous and static testing within the depot, inclusive of the tracks present at the depot. The second trainset, the first one assembled in India, arrived at the depot on February 9, 2025.

=== Delays ===
The line was initially scheduled to open in December 2022. However, due to construction delays, the opening was pushed to June 2023, then to April 2024. The civil work for the line finished in March 2024 and BMRCL planned for the line to be opened in July 2024, but the opening was pushed again to December 2024 due to delays in the delivery of rolling stock. Later, TRSL reported that the first train set delivery had been pushed to late 2024, causing a December opening to be unlikely. Later, it was reported that BMRCL may begin operating a "Plan B" which would involve the opening of the line in December with only seven stations opening with a 30-minute frequency, to be reduced later with the opening of the remaining nine stations. BMRCL continued to move the opening of the line until August 2025.

BMRCL then announced that it would decide on the opening of the Yellow Line after receiving the CMRS decision. Two options were reportedly under consideration — opening all stations with a lower frequency of trains or starting operations at a fewer number of stations with a slightly higher frequency. Following the CMRS approval in early August 2025, BMRCL chose to open all stations along the corridor, operating trains at a frequency of 25 minutes. Operations on the line have started as of 11 August 2025.

== Stations ==
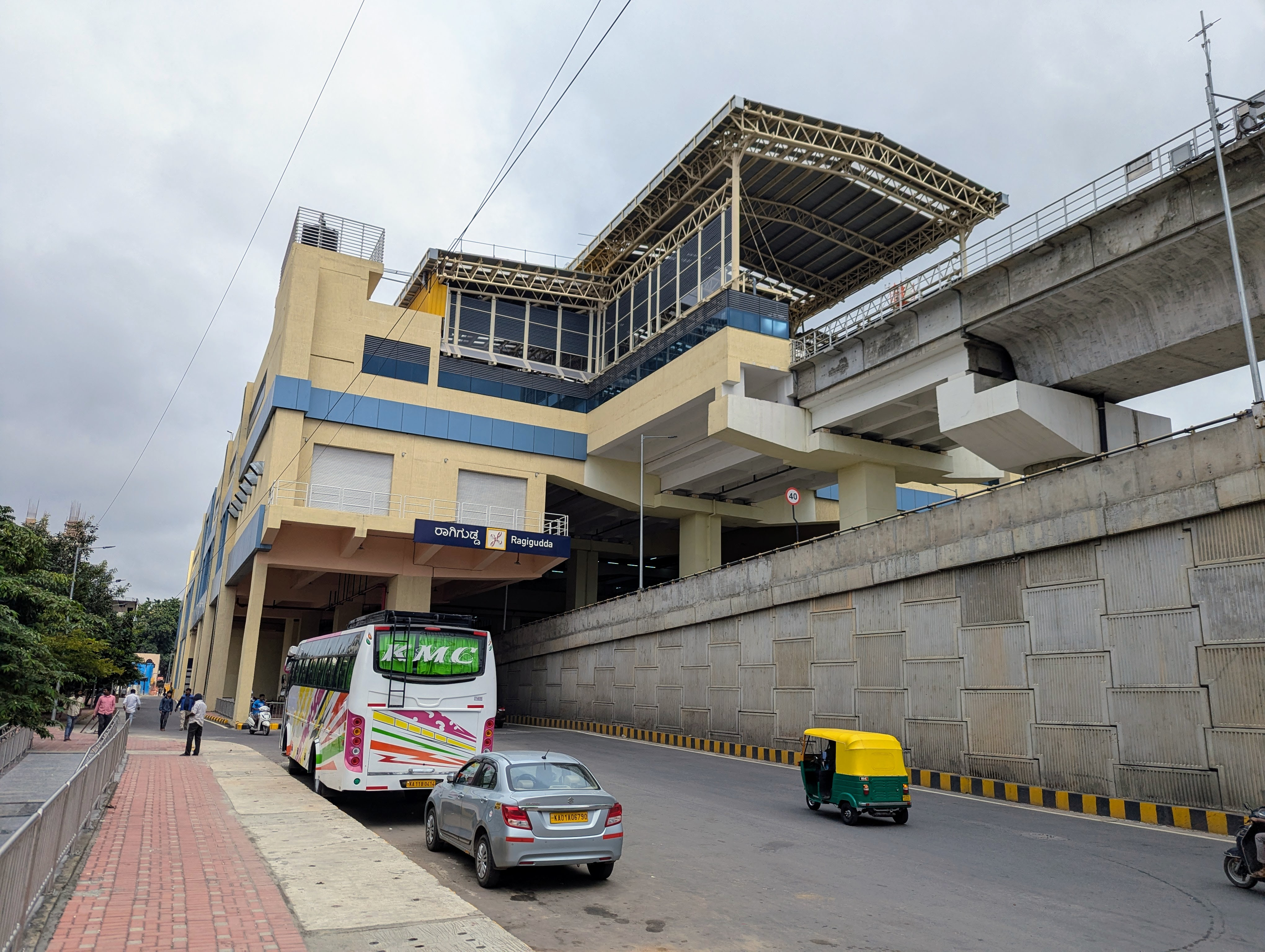
Ragigudda metro station, showing the start of the Raggigudda-Silk Board Flyover

There are currently 16 stations on the Yellow Line. All stations are fully elevated, while four stations (Ragigudda, Jayadeva Hospital, BTM Layout, and Central Silk Board) are built along with the new Ragigudda-Silk Board flyover as a rail and road flyover. The depot for the line is located near the Hebbagodi station.

In 2018, the Infosys Foundation and BMRCL signed an Memorandum of Understanding for the construction and maintenance of the Konappana Agrahara metro station. Infosys Foundation will provide ₹115 crore (US$12 million) for the construction of the station, while 3000 square feet of the station land was allocated for use by Infosys and a direct construction of a foot over bridge from the metro to the Infosys campus was approved. In 2019 the government approved renaming the station to "Infosys Foundation Konappana Agrahara" for a period of 30 years. Similarly, in December 2024, BMRCL and Delta Electronics signed an agreement to provide ₹55 crore (US$5.9 million) for the construction of the Bommasandra station. As per the agreement the Bommasandra station was renamed to "Delta Electronics Bommasandra" for a period of 30 years.

=== Interchanges ===
Passenger interchange facilities, connecting to other metro and railway lines, will be provided at the following stations:

- Rashtreeya Vidyalaya Road (connects to the Green Line, which runs between Madavara and Silk Institute)
- Jayadeva Hospital (connects to the Pink Line, which runs between Nagawara and Kalena Agrahara)
- Central Silk Board (connects to the Blue Line, which runs between Central Silk Board and KIAL Terminals)

Yellow Line
#	Station name		Opening	Connections	Station type	Platform type
#	English	Kannada	Opening	Connections	Station type	Platform type
1	Rashtreeya Vidyalaya Road	ರಾಷ್ಟ್ರೀಯ ವಿದ್ಯಾಲಯ ರಸ್ತೆ	11 August 2025	Green Line	Elevated	Island & Side
2	Ragigudda	ರಾಗಿಗುಡ್ಡ	11 August 2025		Elevated	Side
3	Jayadeva Hospital	ಜಯದೇವ ಆಸ್ಪತ್ರೆ	11 August 2025	Pink Line	Elevated	Side
4	BTM Layout	ಬಿ ಟಿ ಎಂ ಬಡಾವಣೆ	11 August 2025		Elevated	Side
5	Central Silk Board	ಕೇಂದ್ರ ರೇಷ್ಮೆ ಮಂಡಳಿ	11 August 2025	Blue Line (under construction)	Elevated	Side
6	Bommanahalli	ಬೊಮ್ಮನಹಳ್ಳಿ	11 August 2025		Elevated	Side
7	Hongasandra	ಹೊಂಗಸಂದ್ರ	11 August 2025		Elevated	Side
8	Kudlu Gate	ಕೂಡ್ಲು ಗೇಟ್	11 August 2025		Elevated	Side
9	Singasandra	ಸಿಂಗಸಂದ್ರ	11 August 2025		Elevated	Side
10	Hosa Road	ಹೊಸ ರಸ್ತೆ	11 August 2025		Elevated	Side
11	Beratena Agrahara	ಬೆರಟೇನ ಅಗ್ರಹಾರ	11 August 2025		Elevated	Side
12	Electronic City	ಎಲೆಕ್ಟ್ರಾನಿಕ್ ಸಿಟಿ	11 August 2025		Elevated	Side
13	Infosys Foundation Konappana Agrahara	ಇನ್ಫೋಸಿಸ್ ಫೌಂಡೇಷನ್ ಕೋನಪ್ಪನ ಅಗ್ರಹಾರ	11 August 2025		Elevated	Side
14	Huskur Road	ಹುಸ್ಕೂರು ರಸ್ತೆ	11 August 2025		Elevated	Side
15	Biocon Hebbagodi	ಬಯೋಕಾನ್ ಹೆಬ್ಬಗೋಡಿ	11 August 2025		Elevated	Side
16	Delta Electronics Bommasandra	ಡೆಲ್ಟಾ ಎಲೆಕ್ಟ್ರಾನಿಕ್ಸ್ ಬೊಮ್ಮಸಂದ್ರ	11 August 2025		Elevated	Side

== See also ==
- Namma Metro
  - Purple Line
  - Green Line
  - Pink Line
  - Blue Line
  - Orange Line
  - Red Line
  - Grey Line
  - Inner Ring Line
  - List of Namma Metro stations
- Rapid transit in India
- List of metro systems
- Raggigudda-Silk Board Flyover
