= Kalena Agrahara metro station =

Namma Metro's Pink Line terminal metro station

Kalena Agrahara
- Kalena Agrahara metro station as of November 2026

General information
- Location: Mantri Residency Rd, near Sri Meenakshi Sundareshwara Temple, Classic Orchards Layout, Kalena Agrahara, Bengaluru, Karnataka 560076
- Coordinates: 12.87158°N 77.59363°E
- System: Namma Metro
- Owner: Bangalore Metro Rail Corporation Ltd (BMRCL)
- Operator: Namma Metro
- Line: Pink Line
- Platforms: Side platform and Island platform Platform-1 → S.G. Palya (Suddagunte Palya) * / Kothanur Depot; Platform-2 → S.G. Palya (Suddagunte Palya) * Platform-3 → Train Terminates Here * (Further extension to Nagawara in the future)
- Tracks: 3

Construction
- Structure type: Elevated, Double track
- Platform levels: 2
- Parking: (TBC)
- Accessible: Yes
- Architect: GR Infraprojects Ltd. (Simplex contract terminated in 2021)

Other information
- Status: Staffed and Operational
- Station code: (TBC)

History
- Opened: 13 November 2026; 3 days ago (Inaugural run); 14 November 2026; 2 days ago (Commercial)
- Electrified: 750 V DC third rail
- Former names: Gottigere

Services
Preceding station	Namma Metro	Following station
Hulimavu towards S.G. Palya (Suddagunte Palya)	Pink Line (Partially Operational)	Terminus
Hulimavu towards Nagawara	Pink Line (Operational around March 2027)	Terminus
Route map
Location

Kalena Agrahara (formerly known as Gottigere) is an elevated southern terminal metro station on the North-South corridor of the Pink Line of Namma Metro in Bengaluru, India. This metro station serves residential properties and a few other locations including Prestige Elysian, Holy Spirit School (ICSE), Doddakammanahalli suburban area and Decathlon (Bannerghatta Road).

As per the latest updates, this metro station, which covers a total distance of 7.5 km elevated stretch (Kalena Agrahara - S.G. Palya (Suddagunte Palya)), was inaugurated by the honorable Prime Minister Narendra Modi on 13 November 2026.

== History ==
In March 2017, the Bangalore Metro Rail Corporation Limited (BMRCL) sought bids for building the Kalena Agrahara metro station on the 7.5 km Kalena Agrahara - South Ramp section of the 21.25 km Pink Line of Namma Metro. This section comprises 5 stations, excluding Jayadeva Hospital, which was part of a joint venture between HCC - URC Constructions. Initially, Simplex Infrastructures won the tender in September 2017 but due to slow progress, their contract was terminated. In July 2021, GR Infraprojects became the lowest bidder and was awarded the Rs 364.87 Crore contract for this section. They commenced the construction of this metro station as per the agreement.

== Station layout ==
G	Street Level	Exit/ Entrance
L1	Mezzanine	Fare control, station agent, Metro Card vending machines, crossover
L2	Side platform | Doors will open on the left
L2	Platform 2 Southbound	Towards → Train Terminates Here
L2	Platform 1 Northbound	Towards ← S.G. Palya (Suddagunte Palya)**; Next Station: Hulimavu
L2	Island platform | P1 Doors will open on the left | P3 Doors will open on the right
L2	Platform 3 Northbound	Towards ← S.G. Palya (Suddagunte Palya)** / Kothanur Depot; Next Station: Hulimavu
L2	Note:	(Towards Nagawara - Operational during peak hours) ** To be further extended to Nagawara in the future

== Connections ==
The station itself does not connect to any other lines of Namma Metro. The closest interchanges are at JP Nagar 4th Phase (Orange Line), Jayadeva Hospital (Yellow Line), and Dairy Circle (Red Line), which are respectively three, four, and five stations away from Kalena Agrahara on the Pink Line.

== Entry/Exit ==
Station board during the inauguration of Pink line, 2026

== See also ==
- Bengaluru
- List of Namma Metro stations
- Transport in Karnataka
- List of metro systems
- List of rapid transit systems in India
- Bengaluru Metropolitan Transport Corporation
