= Rashtreeya Vidyalaya Road metro station =

Namma Metro's Green & Yellow Line interchange station

Rashtreeya Vidyalaya Road
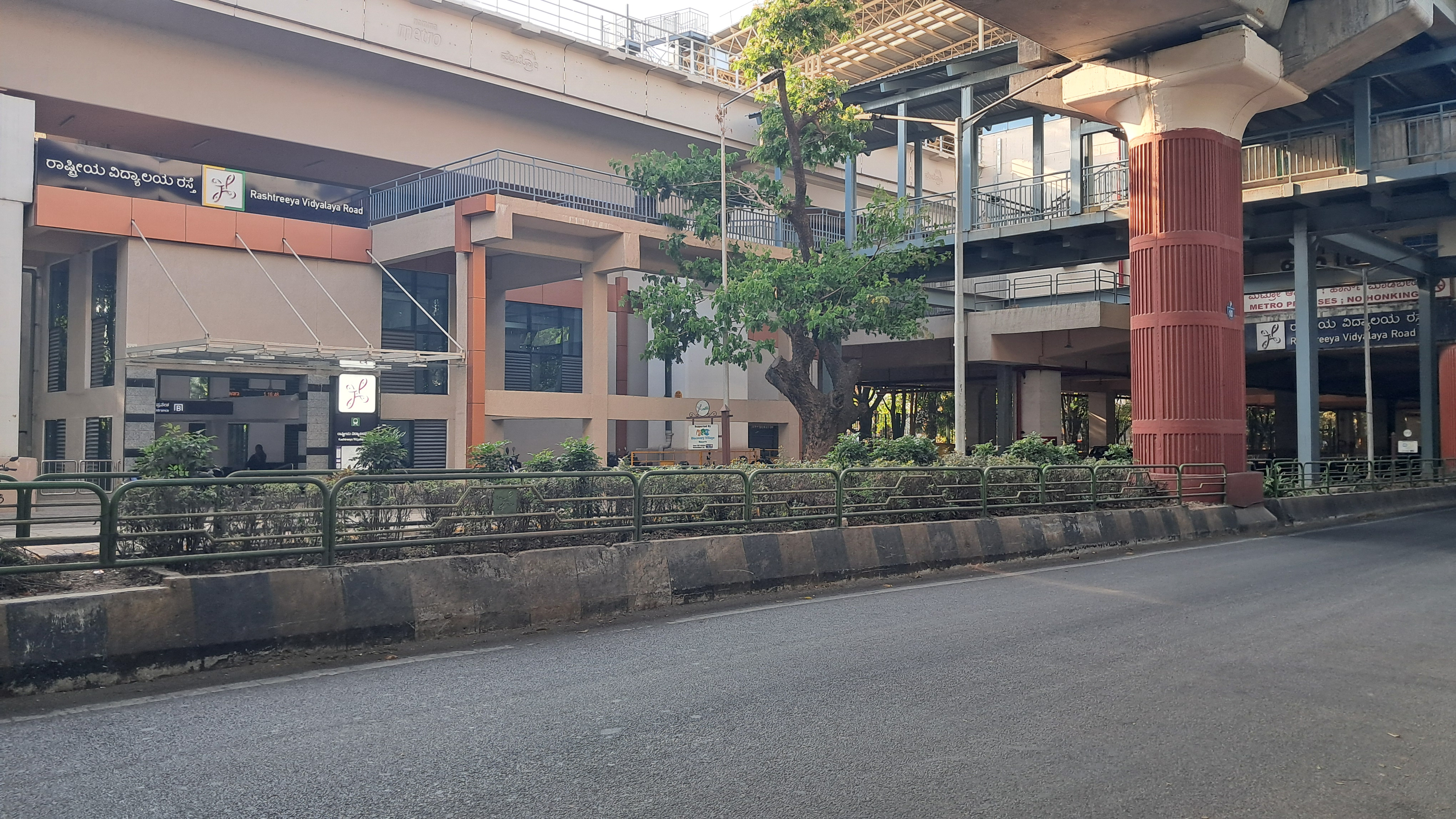
- Building showing 'B' Entrance on the Jayanagar 8th block side

General information
- Other names: R. V. Road, Rashtreeya Vidyalaya Raste
- Location: Rashtreeya Vidyalaya Road, 5th Block, Jayanagar, Bengaluru, Karnataka 560041
- Coordinates: 12.921458°N 77.580375°E
- System: Namma Metro station
- Owner: Bangalore Metro Rail Corporation Ltd (BMRCL)
- Operator: Namma Metro
- Line: Green Line Yellow Line
- Platforms: Side platform Platform-1 → Madavara; Platform-2 → Silk Institute; Platform-3 → Delta Electronics Bommasandra; Platform-4 → Train Terminates Here
- Tracks: 4

Construction
- Structure type: Elevated, Double track
- Platform levels: 2
- Accessible: Yes
- Architect: IVRCL Ltd. HCC - URC Construction JV

Other information
- Status: Staffed
- Station code: RVR

History
- Opened: 18 June 2017; 9 years ago 10 August 2025; 12 months ago
- Electrified: 750 V DC third rail

Services
Preceding station	Namma Metro	Following station
Jayanagar towards Madavara	Green Line	Banashankari towards Silk Institute
Terminus	Yellow Line	Ragigudda towards Delta Electronics Bommasandra
Route map
Location

Rashtreeya Vidyalaya Road is an elevated interchange metro station on the north–south corridor of the Green Line and the east–west corridor of the Yellow Line of Namma Metro serving the 5th, 7th and 8th Block of Jayanagar area of Bangalore, India. It was opened to the public on 18 June 2017.

The Yellow Line is operational from 10 August 2025 and has been officially inaugurated by Prime Minister Narendra Modi instead of May 2025 which was announced by the Namma Metro Managing Director, Maheshwar Rao, previously mentioned by Karnataka Deputy Chief Minister and Bengaluru Development Minister D. K. Shivakumar and with four trainsets which will be ready for operations after arriving from Titagarh Rail Systems in Kolkata.

== History ==
=== Yellow Line ===
In December 2016, the Bangalore Metro Rail Corporation Limited (BMRCL) issued a call for bids to construct the terminal metro station (Rashtreeya Vidyalaya Road) along the 6.340 km (3.9 mi) km Reach 5 – Package 3 section (Central Silk Board - Rashtreeya Vidyalaya Road) of the 18.825 km (11.7 mi) Yellow Line of Namma Metro. On 16 May 2017, HCC-URC Cementation JV was selected as the lowest bidder for this stretch, with their bid closely aligning with the original cost estimates. Consequently, the contract was successfully awarded to the company, which then commenced construction of the metro station in accordance with the agreements.

== Passenger services ==
=== Access ===
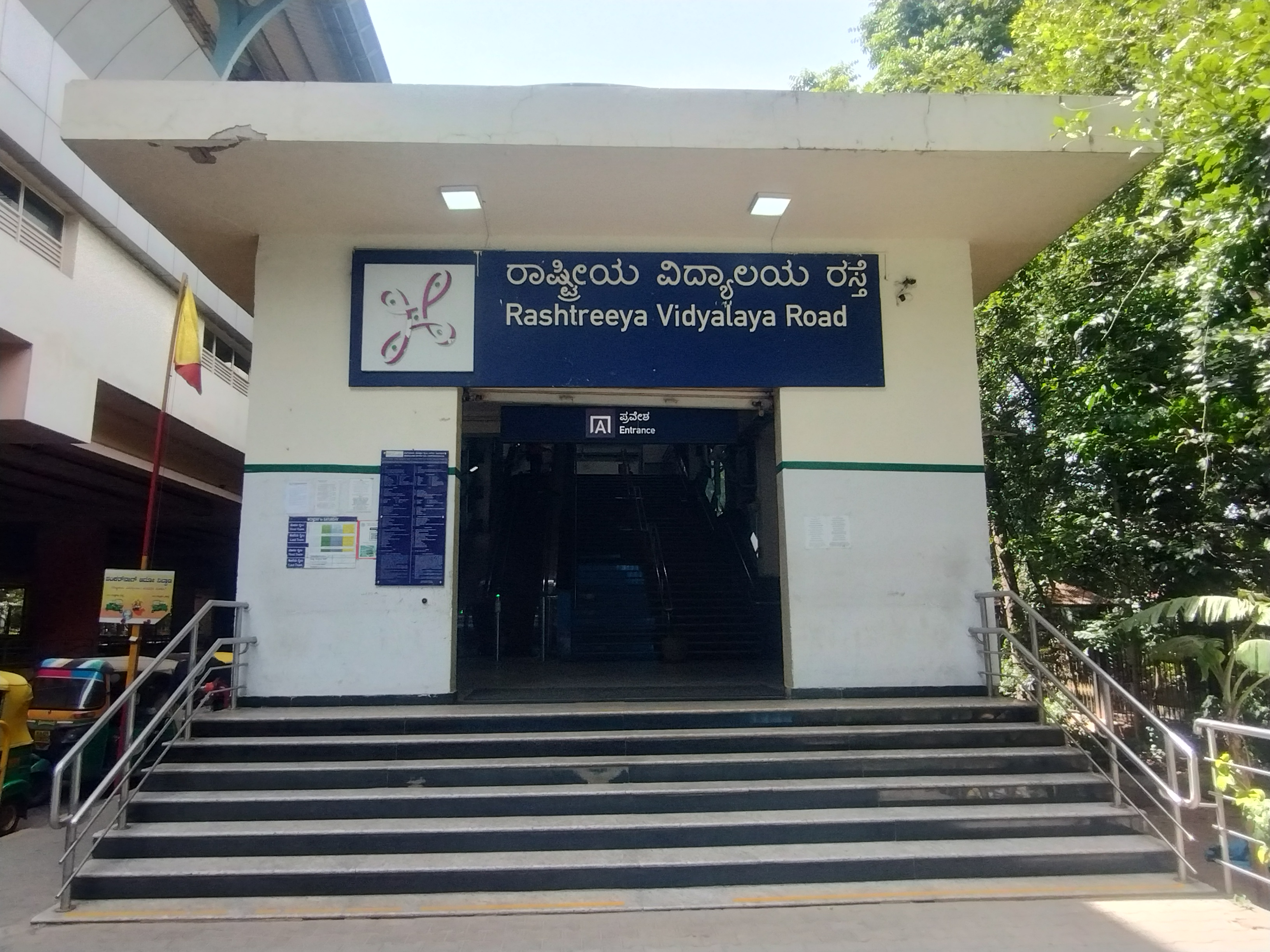
The station entrance/exit 'A' (Jayanagar 5th Block side)

Rashtreeya Vidyalaya Road

There are 3 Entry/Exit points – A, B and C. Commuters can use either of the points for their travel.

- Entry/Exit point A: Towards Jayanagar 5th Block side
- Entry/Exit point B: Towards Jayanagar 8th Block side with
- Entry/Exit point C: Towards Jayanagar 7th Block side

=== Station layout ===
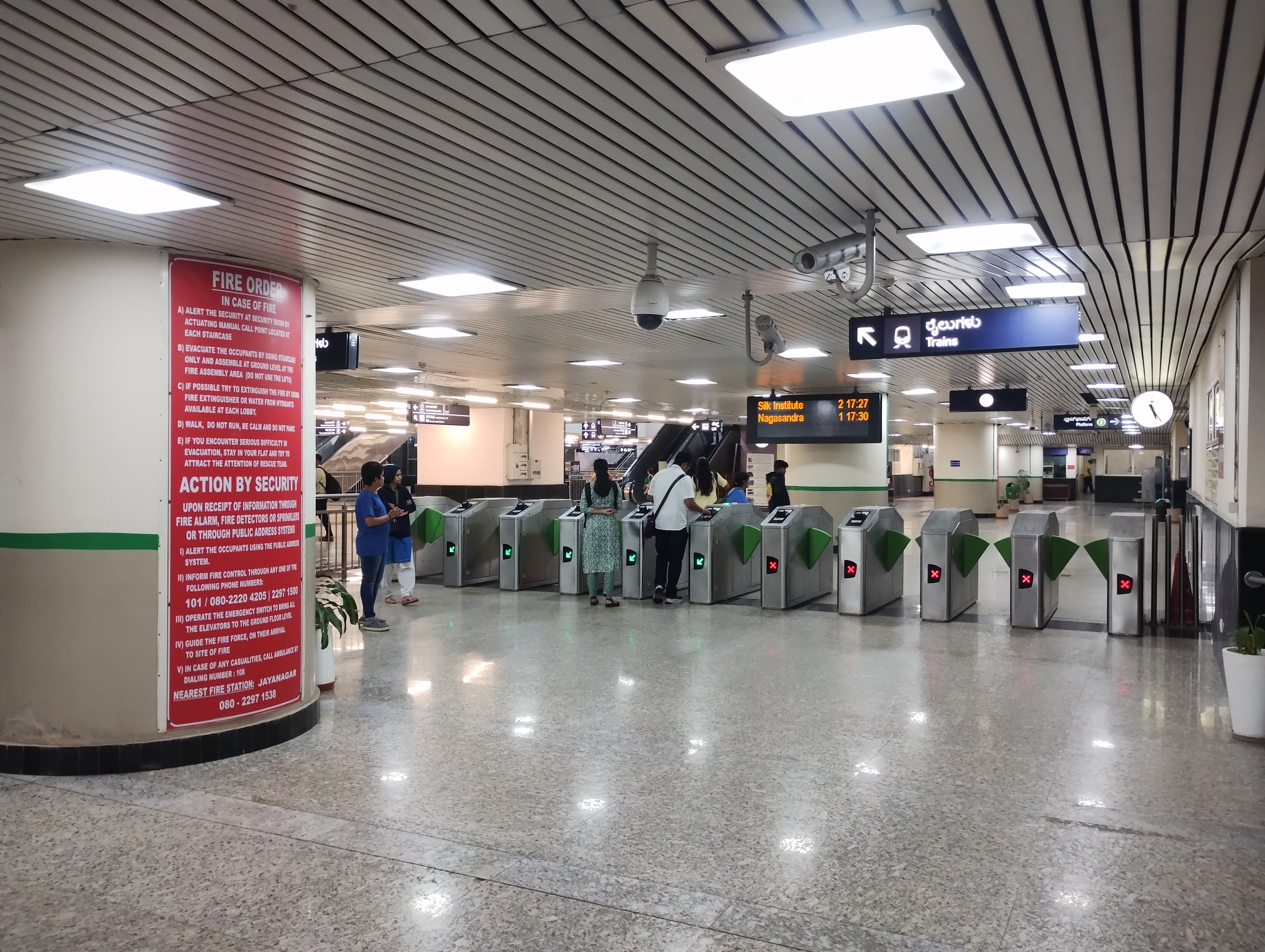
Concourse

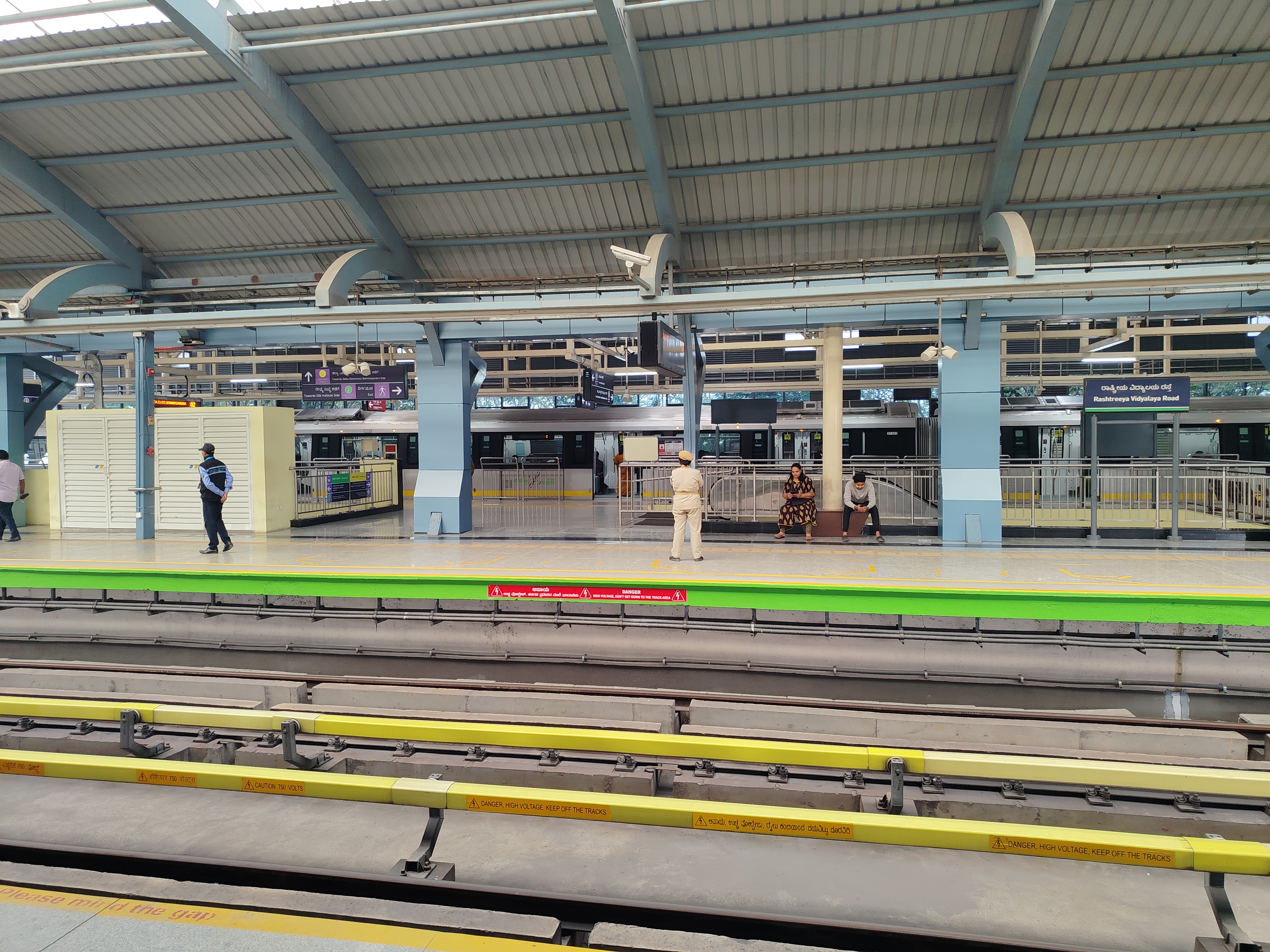
View of P1 platform (Green line) and adjacent P3 with Yellow line train

G	Street level	Exit/Entrance
L1	Mezzanine	Fare control, station agent, Metro Card vending machines, crossover
L2	Side platform | Doors will open on the left
L2	Platform 2 Southbound	Towards → Silk Institute; Next Station: Banashankari
L2	Platform 1 Northbound	Towards ← Madavara; Next Station: Jayanagar
L2	Side platform | P1 & P3 doors will open on the left
L2	Platform 3 Southbound	Towards → Delta Electronics Bommasandra; Next Station: Ragigudda
L2	Platform 4 Northbound	Towards ← Train Terminates Here
L2	Side platform | Doors will open on the left

== See also ==
- Bengaluru
- List of Namma Metro stations
- Transport in Karnataka
- List of metro systems
- List of rapid transit systems in India
