= Delta Electronics Bommasandra metro station =

Namma Metro's Yellow Line terminal metro station

Delta Electronics Bommasandra
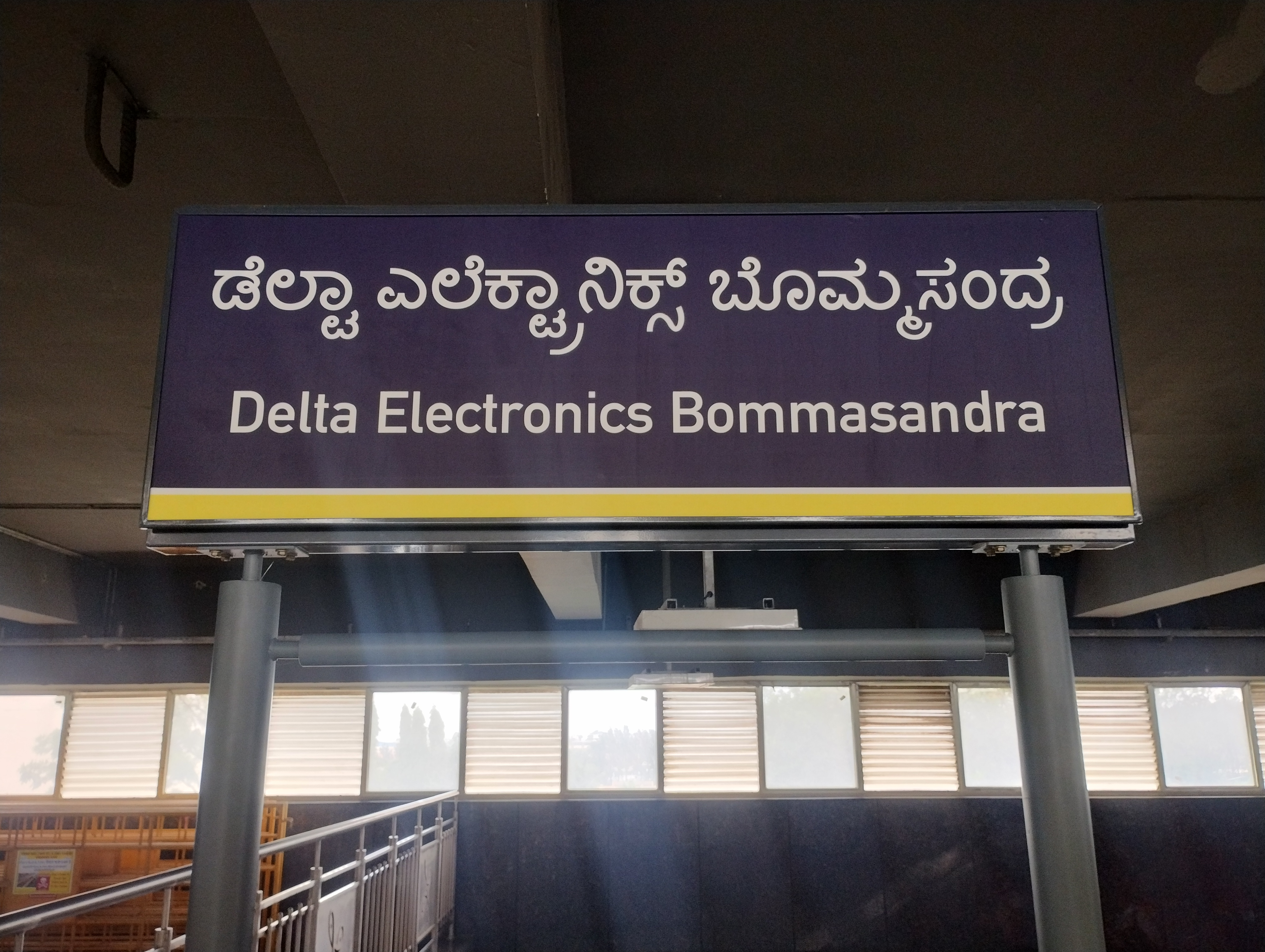
- The station in August 2025

General information
- Location: Bommasandra Industrial Area, Bommasandra, Karnataka 560099
- Coordinates: 12.81933°N 77.68834°E
- System: Namma Metro
- Owner: Namma Metro
- Operator: Bangalore Metro Rail Corporation Ltd (BMRCL)
- Line: Yellow Line
- Platforms: 2 (2 side platforms)
- Tracks: 2
- Connections: Heelalige railway station

Construction
- Structure type: Elevated
- Platform levels: 2
- Parking: Two wheeler parking only
- Accessible: Yes
- Architect: ITD - ITD Cementation India JV

Other information
- Status: Operational and staffed
- Station code: BMSD

History
- Opened: 10 August 2025; 14 months ago
- Former names: Bommasandra

Services
| Preceding station | Namma Metro | Following station |
|---|---|---|
| Biocon Hebbagodi towards Rashtreeya Vidyalaya Road | Yellow Line | Terminus |
Route map
Location

Delta Electronics Bommasandra (formerly called Bommasandra) is an elevated terminal metro station on the Yellow Line of the Namma Metro serving the industrial area of Bommasandra and the Heelalige railway station.

== History ==
In December 2016, the Bangalore Metro Rail Corporation Limited (BMRCL) issued a call for bids to construct the Bommasandra metro station along the 6.418 km Reach 5 – Package 1 section (Bommasandra - Hosa Road) of the 18.825 km Yellow Line of Namma Metro. On 25 March 2017, ITD-ITD Cementation JV was selected as the lowest bidder for this stretch, with their bid closely aligning with the original cost estimates. Consequently, the contract was successfully awarded to the company, which then commenced construction of the metro station in accordance with the agreements.

Taiwanese company Delta Electronics signed an agreement with BMRCL for naming the metro station after their company and registering its rights for 30 years.

The Yellow Line began operations from 10 August 2025 and has been officially inaugurated by Prime Minister Narendra Modi, with four trainsets which are ready for operations after arriving from Titagarh Rail Systems in Kolkata. The opening was delayed from May 2025 as previously announced by the Namma Metro managing director Maheshwar Rao.

== Station layout ==
| G | Street level | Exit/entrance |
| L1 | Mezzanine | Fare control, station agent, Metro Card vending machines, crossover |
| L2 | Side platform | Doors will open on the left |
| L2 | Platform 2 Southbound | Towards → Train Terminates Here |
| L2 | Platform 1 Northbound | Towards ← Rashtreeya Vidyalaya Road; Next station: Biocon Hebbagodi |
| L2 | Side platform | Doors will open on the left |

== Entry/Exits ==
There are two entry/exit points – A and B.

- Entry/Exit point A: Towards Bommasandra Industrial Area side
- Entry/Exit point B: Towards Bommasandra Industrial Area side
  - Wheelchair accessibility has been provided for both entry/exit points A and B.

== Gallery ==
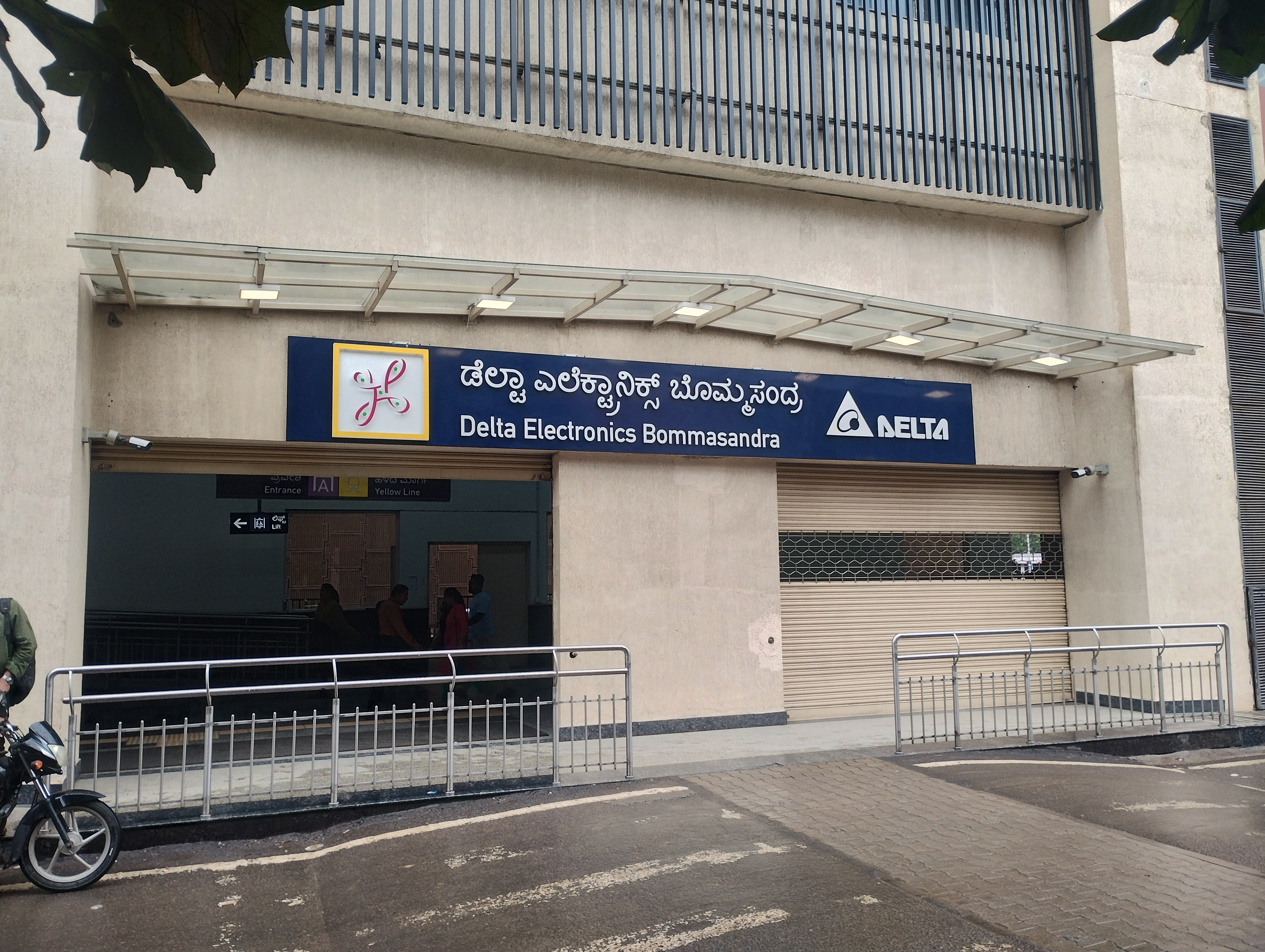
Front entrance of station

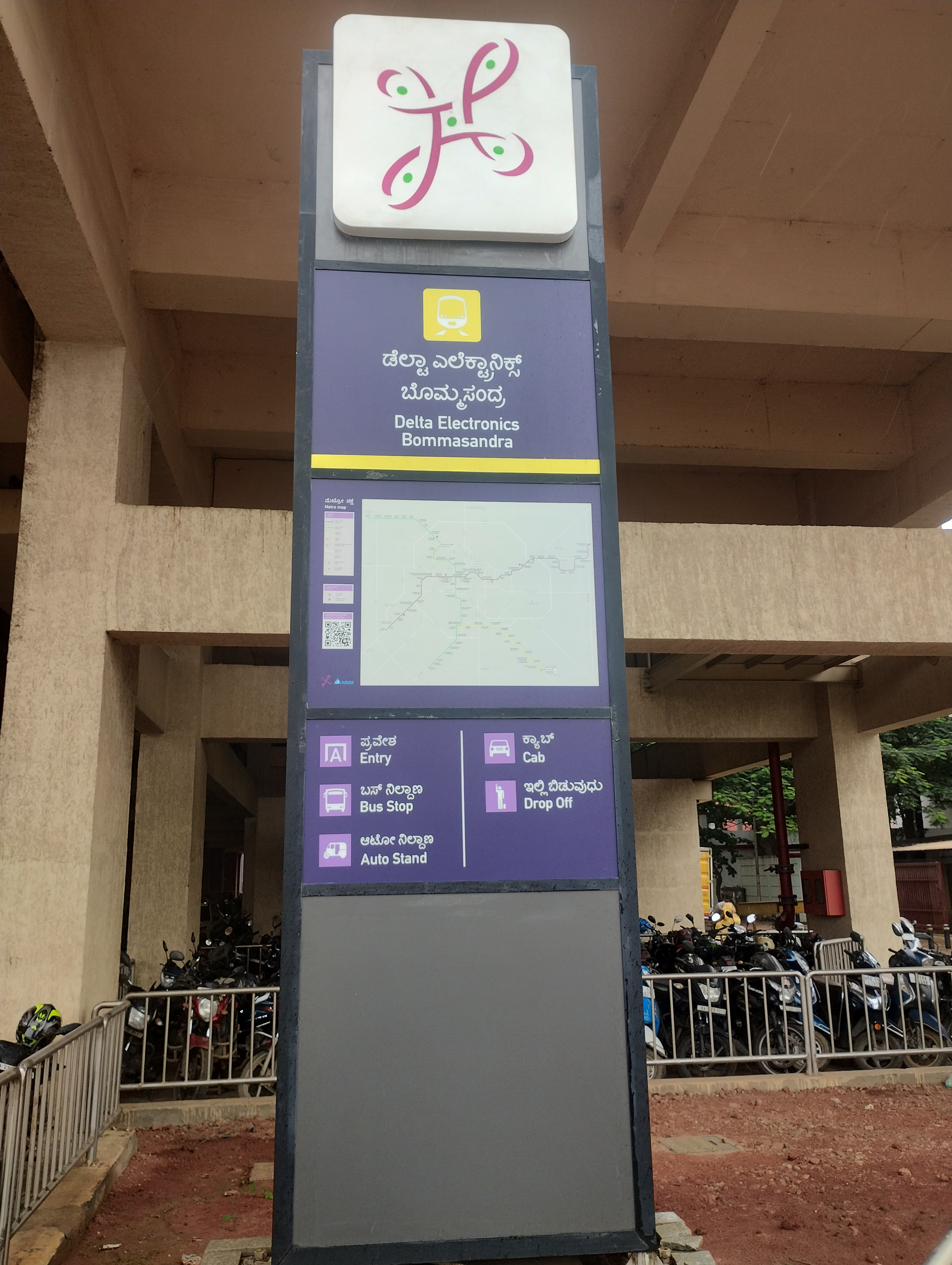
Station Board displaying legend and Namma Metro system map

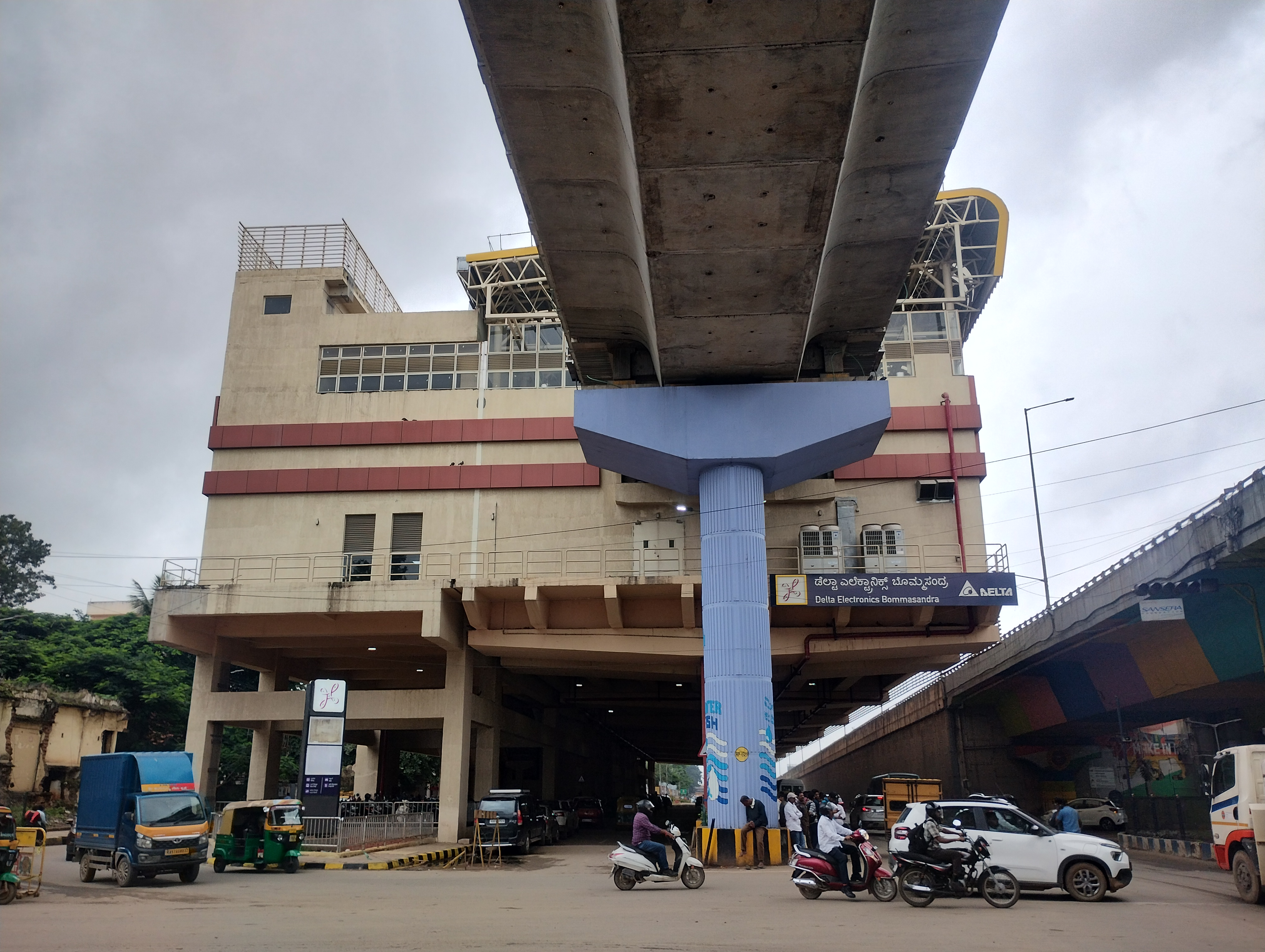
Front view of station building heading towards Electronic City

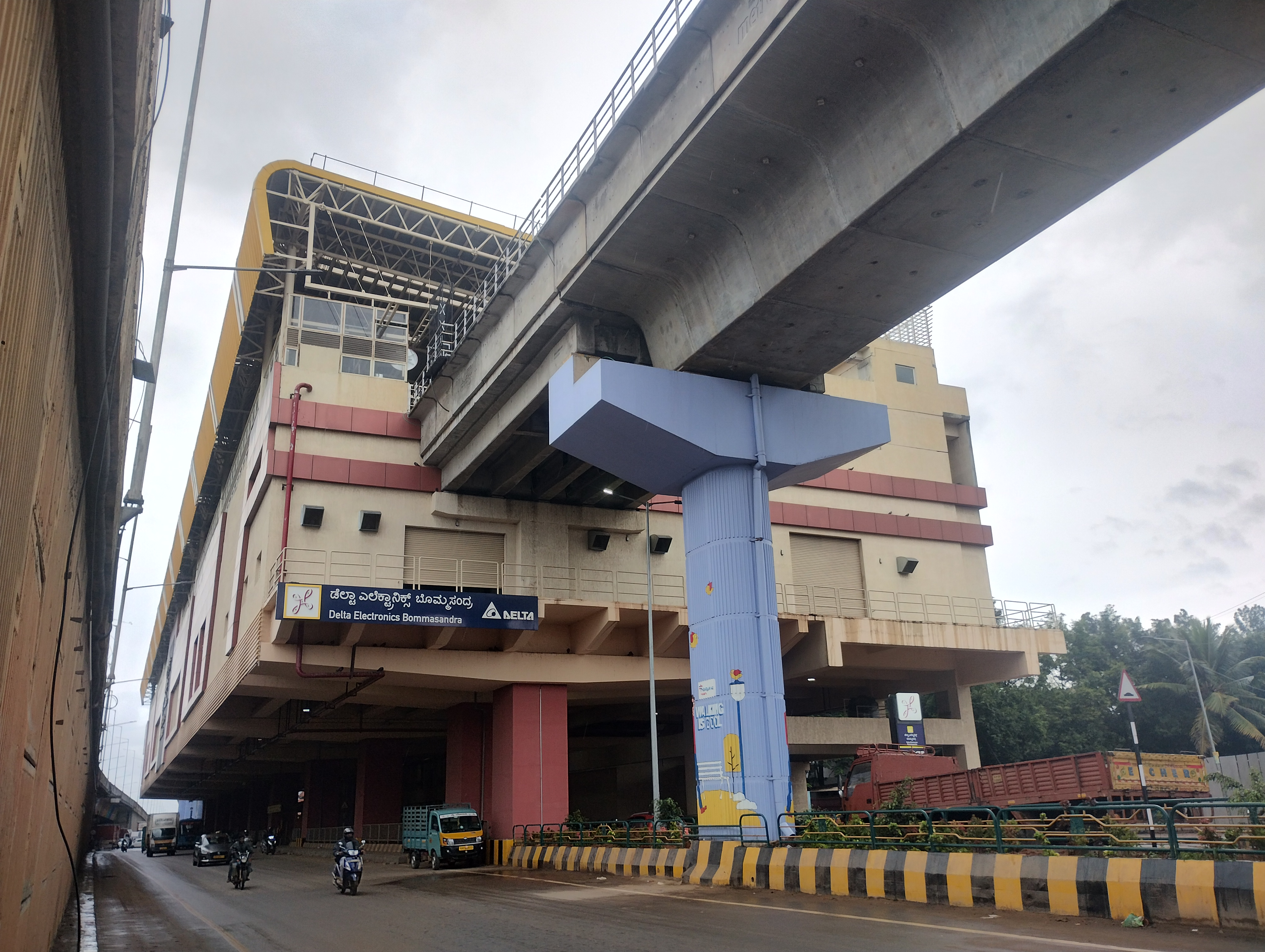
Rear view of station building entering from Attibele

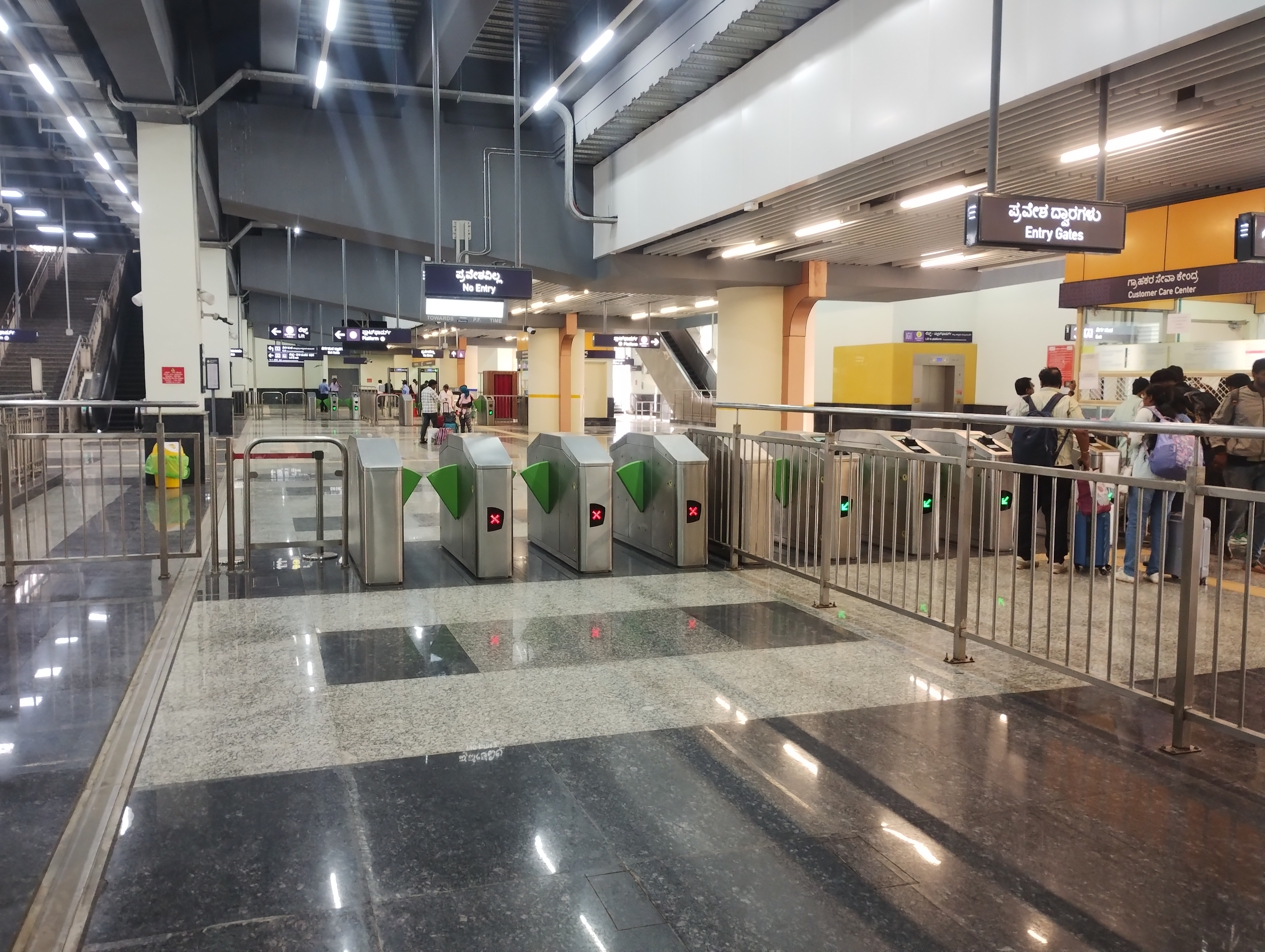
Station interior

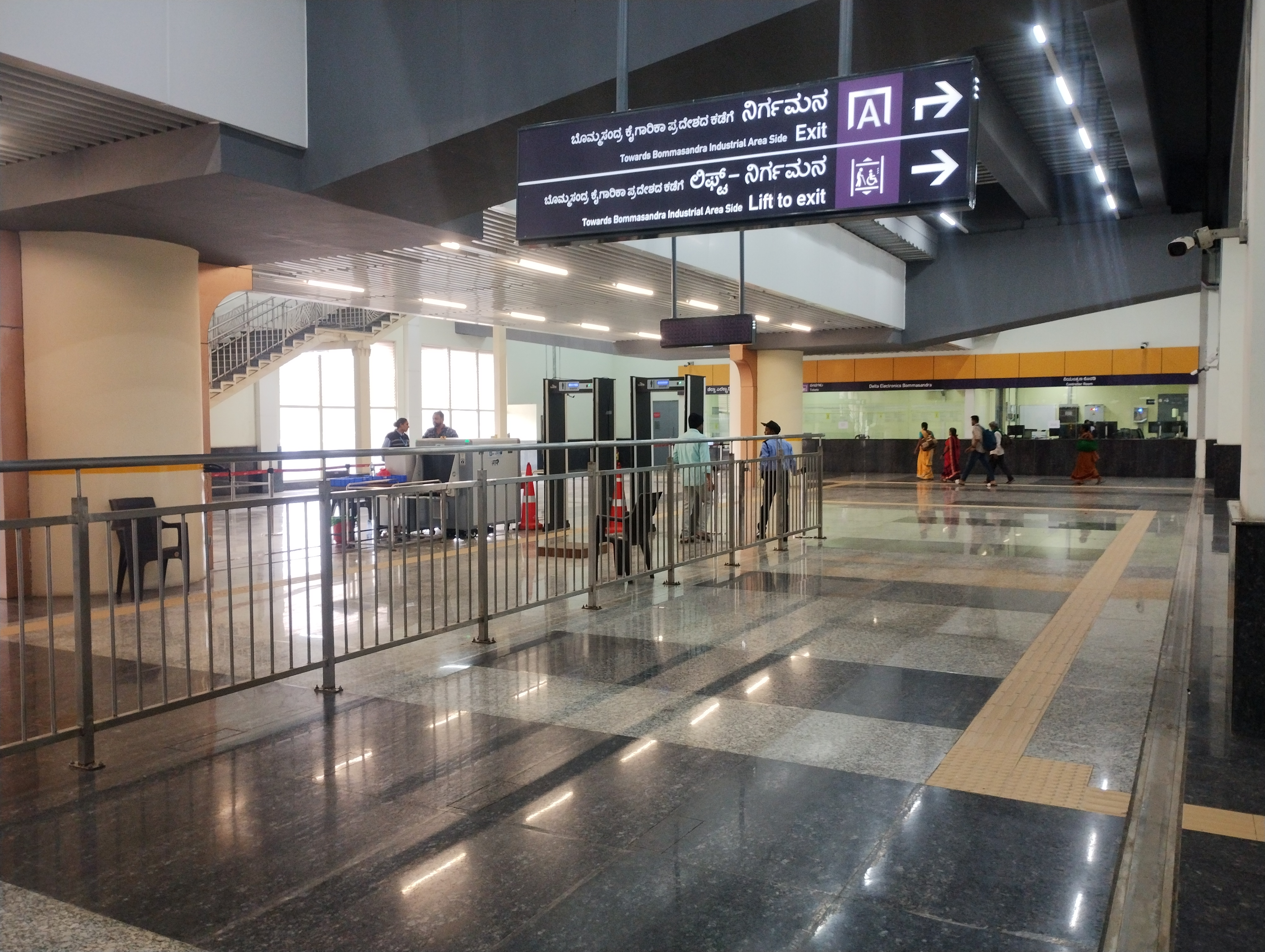
Station interior showing the ticket counter at the back

== See also ==
- Bommasandra, Bengaluru
- Bengaluru
- List of Namma Metro stations
- Transport in Karnataka
- List of metro systems
- List of rapid transit systems in India
- Bengaluru Metropolitan Transport Corporation

== Naming rights ==
In late 2024, the BMRCL entered into a 30-year naming-rights agreement under which Delta Electronics acquired the right to attach its name to the station, formerly known simply as Bommasandra. The agreement was reported to be worth approximately ₹65 crore for the 30-year term. It is the third corporate naming-rights agreement on the Yellow Line, following the Infosys Foundation's agreement for Konappana Agrahara metro station and the Biocon Foundation's agreement for Biocon Hebbagodi metro station.
