= Transport in Bengaluru =

Overview of transport systems in Bengaluru, India

Transport in Bengaluru Beṃgaḷūrinalli sārige
- Country: India
- State: Karnataka
- Governing body: Greater Bengaluru Authority
- Railway zone: South Western Railway
- Airport (IATA): BLR (T1 & T2)
- Metro network: Namma Metro – 96.10 km, 83 stations (2025)
- BMTC daily ridership: ~48 lakh (2025)
- Metro daily ridership: ~9.16 lakh (April 2026 avg.)
- Registered vehicles: ~1.23 crore (2024–25)
- Road network: ~15,000 km
- Website: bmrc.co.in mybmtc.karnataka.gov.in

Transport in Bengaluru — key statistics
Indicator	Data
Road network length	~15,000 km
Registered vehicles (2024–25)	1.23 crore
Vehicle density	823 vehicles/km
BMTC fleet size	7,067 buses (incl. 1,799 EVs)
BMTC daily ridership (2025)	~48 lakh
Metro network length	96.10 km (3 lines, 83 stations)
Metro daily ridership (April 2026 avg.)	9.16 lakh
Metro all-time single-day record	10,48,031 (11 August 2025)
Airport annual passengers (2024–25)	41.88 million
Annual hours lost to congestion (avg. commuter)	~117 hours
Private vehicle modal share	~80% of trips
Public transport modal share target (2030)	70%

Transport in Bengaluru encompasses a broad range of intracity and intercity modes. Within the city, residents rely on BMTC buses, the Namma Metro rapid transit network, auto rickshaws, app-based taxis, and private vehicles. Intercity travel is served by KSRTC, NWKRTC, and KKRTC buses, Indian Railways through the South Western Railway zone, and Kempegowda International Airport (IATA: BLR). The city also has an under-construction commuter rail network, the Bengaluru Suburban Rail Project (BSRP), expected to supplement the metro and relieve road traffic when complete.

As India's third-most-populous city and its technology capital, Bengaluru's transport infrastructure has come under severe strain. Total registered vehicles reached 1.23 crore in 2024–25 — growing at a rate of roughly 2,000 vehicles per day — while the road network of approximately 15,000 km yields a vehicle density of 823 vehicles per kilometre, among the highest of any Indian city. Private vehicles account for approximately 80 per cent of all trips, according to the Google Environmental Insights Explorer (2023), a figure that stands in sharp contrast to the Directorate of Urban Land Transport (DULT)'s target of 70 per cent public transport modal share by 2030. The city is consistently ranked among the world's most congested urban centres by the TomTom Traffic Index, and the average Bengaluru commuter loses approximately 117 hours each year to traffic delays.

Transport in Bengaluru – Metro, Rail & BMTC Bus Network

== History ==
Organised public transport in Bengaluru began with the incorporation of the Bangalore Transport Company (BTC) on 31 January 1940 by the Mysore State government, which initially operated 103 buses within the city and a further 15 in the Cantonment area. The BTC was nationalised in 1956 and renamed the Bangalore Transport Service (BTS), bringing city bus operations under public ownership. Following the reorganisation of states the same year, services were further consolidated under the Karnataka State Road Transport Corporation (KSRTC), which operated both city and intercity routes. The formal separation of urban operations came in August 1997, when the Government of Karnataka carved out the Bangalore Metropolitan Transport Corporation (BMTC) as a dedicated city bus operator — a bifurcation designed to improve accountability and focus for the growing metropolis.

Rail transport arrived in Bengaluru well before organised bus services. The first railway line connecting the city to Madras (now Chennai) was opened in 1864 by the Madras Railway, initially terminating at Bangalore Cantonment. The Mysore State Railway subsequently extended the network southward, opening the Bengaluru–Mysuru metre-gauge line on 25 February 1882; this line was later converted to broad gauge and doubled. Krantivira Sangolli Rayanna Bengaluru City station developed as the principal intercity terminal serving the former Mysore State territories, while Bangalore Cantonment continued to handle trains arriving from the British Madras Presidency — a dual-terminal legacy that persists in the city's rail geography to this day.

Air transport in the city dates to 1941, when HAL Airport opened as a military airfield; commercial operations began in 1946, and for over six decades it served as Bengaluru's sole civilian airport. By the early 2000s, however, HAL Airport had reached its capacity limits. Kempegowda International Airport, located at Devanahalli approximately 40 km north of the city centre, was commissioned on 24 May 2008, and HAL Airport's civil enclave ceased operations the same day, marking the city's transition into the front rank of Indian aviation hubs.

The idea of a rapid transit system for Bengaluru was discussed for decades before coming to fruition. The Namma Metro project received formal approval and construction began in 2008. The first stretch — Baiyappanahalli to M.G. Road on the Purple Line — opened on 20 October 2011, making Bengaluru the fifth Indian city to operate a metro rail system. By 2025, the metro had grown to 96 km across three operational lines with 83 stations, and for the first time crossed one million boardings in a single day following the opening of the Yellow Line in August 2025.

Throughout this period, road vehicle registrations grew at a pace far outstripping infrastructure expansion. The city, which had one crore registered vehicles in 2020–21, crossed 1.23 crore by 2024–25. This structural mismatch between vehicle growth and road capacity has made mass transit investment the central preoccupation of transport policy in Bengaluru for the better part of two decades.

== Transport governance ==
Bengaluru's transport planning and delivery involves a large number of agencies whose overlapping mandates have historically complicated coordinated action.

The Directorate of Urban Land Transport (DULT), established in 2007 under the Urban Development Department of the Government of Karnataka, is the principal transport planning body for the Bengaluru Metropolitan Region (BMR). DULT prepares Master Plans for transport infrastructure, coordinates across agencies, appraises projects for bilateral or central assistance, and serves as the secretariat for the Bengaluru Metropolitan Land Transport Authority.

The Bengaluru Metropolitan Land Transport Authority (BMLTA) is a statutory body created under the BMLTA Act, passed by the Karnataka Legislative Assembly in December 2022 and notified by the state government in January 2023. It is chaired ex-officio by the Chief Minister of Karnataka, with the Commissioner of DULT serving as its Chief Executive Officer. Its Executive Committee includes the heads of BBMP/GBA, the City Police Commissioner, the BDA Commissioner, and the Managing Directors of BMTC and BMRCL, alongside civil society and academic representatives. The BMLTA is mandated to prepare a Comprehensive Mobility Plan (CMP) revised at least every five years, covering public transport routes, road networks, accessible mobility, pedestrian and cycling paths, and traffic management. However, as of early 2026, the BMLTA remained not fully constituted, with draft rules having been published for public feedback only in January 2025 — nearly two years after the Act was notified. Urban mobility experts have consistently identified the gap between BMLTA's establishment and its operationalisation as a structural barrier to integrated transport planning in Bengaluru.

Other agencies with significant transport roles include the Bengaluru Development Authority (BDA), which controls arterial road planning and major road projects such as the Peripheral Ring Road; the Bengaluru Metropolitan Region Development Authority (BMRDA), which governs planning in the larger metropolitan region; the National Highways Authority of India (NHAI), which maintains national highway stretches within and around the city; the Greater Bengaluru Authority (GBA) and its five city corporations, which maintain the local road network; and the Bengaluru City Traffic Police, which manages signal operations and enforcement.

== Modal share ==
Private vehicles dominate Bengaluru's modal split. According to the Google Environmental Insights Explorer (2023), private modes — cars, motorcycles, and app-based rides — account for approximately 80 per cent of all trips in the city, compared to a South Asia average that makes Bengaluru's public transport access relatively strong — 72 per cent of the population lives within convenient distance of a public transport service — yet utilisation remains skewed toward private modes. Among the modes used, two-wheelers account for the largest share of vehicle-based trips, with city buses historically reporting a bus modal share among the highest of any Indian city at approximately 43 per cent in comprehensive surveys — reflecting the scale of the BMTC network — though that figure has eroded with the rise of private vehicle ownership and app-based taxis.

A 2023 commuter study by the Bangalore Political Action Committee (B.PAC), based on 3,855 respondents, found that approximately 60 per cent of respondents used personal vehicles (cars or two-wheelers) for daily travel. The same study found that the single most cited barrier to shifting to public transport was the absence of reliable first- and last-mile connectivity — particularly among women commuters, 40 per cent of whom highlighted this as their primary concern. A 2024 white paper by Namma Yatri found that 95 per cent of private vehicle users said they would switch to public transport if last-mile connectivity were adequately addressed.

The DULT's Comprehensive Mobility Plan and Transit-Oriented Development (TOD) policy set a target of 70 per cent public transport modal share by 2030, with 60 per cent of the city's population housed within TOD zones and enhanced floor area ratios (FAR) of 300–500 per cent around metro stations to concentrate density at transit nodes. A proposed 600-km cycling network by 2035 is also part of the Non-Motorised Transport (NMT) Policy prepared by DULT, though implementation has been slow.

== Intracity ==
=== Road ===
Bengaluru's road network spans approximately 15,000 km, maintained by the Greater Bengaluru Authority (GBA) and its five City Corporations — which assumed responsibility from the Bruhat Bengaluru Mahanagara Palike (BBMP) under the Greater Bengaluru Governance Act, 2024 — as well as NHAI for national highway stretches. The road hierarchy comprises arterial roads, sub-arterial collectors, and internal neighbourhood streets. The Outer Ring Road (ORR), a 60-km loop maintained jointly by BBMP/GBA and BDA, forms the primary artery of Bengaluru's technology employment belt and intersects all major national highways entering the city: NH 44 (to Delhi and Chennai), NH 75 (to Mangaluru), NH 48 (to Mysuru and Pune), and NH 648 (to Hoskote).

As of 2024–25, the vehicle-to-road ratio stood at 823 vehicles per kilometre — up from 761 the previous year — with two-wheelers and cars accounting for the overwhelming majority of registered vehicles. The TomTom Traffic Index consistently ranks Bengaluru among the world's most congested cities, recording the highest travel time per 10 km in Asia in 2023, with average speeds on the ORR during peak hours falling as low as 4–5 km/h in the worst-affected corridors.

==== Elevated and expressway corridors ====
Bengaluru has three operational tolled corridors that carry significant intercity and intra-city traffic outside the standard road network.

The NICE Road (Nandi Infrastructure Corridor Enterprises Road), a 40-km, 4–6 lane access-controlled peripheral expressway operated by NICE Limited under a concession agreement, runs from Hosur Road in the south to Tumakuru Road in the north-west, linking the ORR-adjacent corridors of Bannerghatta Road, Kanakapura Road, Mysuru Road, and Magadi Road without traversing the city centre. A supplementary 7.5-km NICE Link Road connects the ring to the core city. Together with the proposed Bengaluru Business Corridor (see below), NICE Road forms part of a planned 116-km bypass arc around the metropolitan area. Toll rates on NICE Road were revised upward in 2022 for the first time in five years.

The Electronic City Elevated Expressway, a 9.985-km elevated highway from Silk Board junction to Electronic City, was inaugurated in January 2010 and operates at a height of 17 metres — making it Bengaluru's tallest flyover at the time of opening. It was built under the National Highways Development Project on a build-operate-transfer (BOT) model and substantially reduced travel times to the Electronic City IT cluster. The expressway is the city's second tolled corridor.

The Bengaluru–Chennai Expressway (NH-544), a 258-km, six-lane access-controlled expressway connecting Hoskote near Bengaluru to Sriperumbudur near Chennai, opened its first section in December 2024 and is expected to be fully complete by 2026. It is expected to reduce travel time between the two cities from the current 7–8 hours to approximately 2–3 hours, and functions as an intercity corridor in addition to improving access to Bengaluru's north-eastern outskirts.

==== Planned road infrastructure ====
The Bengaluru Business Corridor (BBC, formerly the Peripheral Ring Road or PRR), is a proposed 73-km, eight-lane access-controlled greenfield expressway connecting Tumakuru Road in the north-west to Hosur Road in the south, passing through Hessaraghatta Road, Doddaballapur Road, Ballari Road, Hennur Road, Old Madras Road, Hoskote Road, and Sarjapur Road. The project, first notified for land acquisition by BDA in 2007 and formally approved by the Karnataka Cabinet in February 2022, has been repeatedly delayed due to land acquisition disputes. In October 2025, the Karnataka government revised the road width from 100 metres to 65 metres to allow space for metro rail integration along the corridor, with the total project cost estimated at ₹22,600 crore; the state cabinet empowered BDA to offer revised compensation for 948 acres — over 50 per cent of the land required — as a step toward resolving the acquisition impasse. The corridor is designed with 16 flyovers, 10 overpasses, and 12 underpasses, and is to be built on a PPP-DBFOT model with 50-year toll rights granted to the concessionaire.

==== Intelligent transport systems ====
The Bengaluru City Traffic Police deploys an Integrated Traffic Management System (ITMS) comprising networked cameras, speed-laser enforcement systems, and AI-based violation detection across key junctions and corridors. In 2024, the system detected 78.07 lakh traffic violations contactlessly — out of a total of 82.86 lakh registered cases — and enabled the collection of ₹80.9 crore in fines. The Public Eye platform allows citizens to report traffic violations digitally. BMTC's fleet management system uses real-time GPS tracking on all buses, feeding both the Namma BMTC passenger app and the corporation's operational control systems.

==== Private and rental vehicles ====
As of 2024–25, Bengaluru had 1.23 crore registered vehicles, adding 7.22 lakh new registrations in that single year — approximately 2,000 per day — of which 4.68 lakh were two-wheelers and 1.45 lakh were cars. Bengaluru alone accounted for more than half of all car registrations across Karnataka in 2024–25. App-based rental services — including motorcycle and bicycle hire via platforms such as Bounce and Yulu, and self-drive car rentals — are widely available across the city. Vehicle purchases in Karnataka attract state road tax levied as a percentage of the ex-showroom price, along with RTO registration and insurance charges. Electric vehicles may qualify for road tax concessions under Karnataka's EV policy.

==== Buses ====
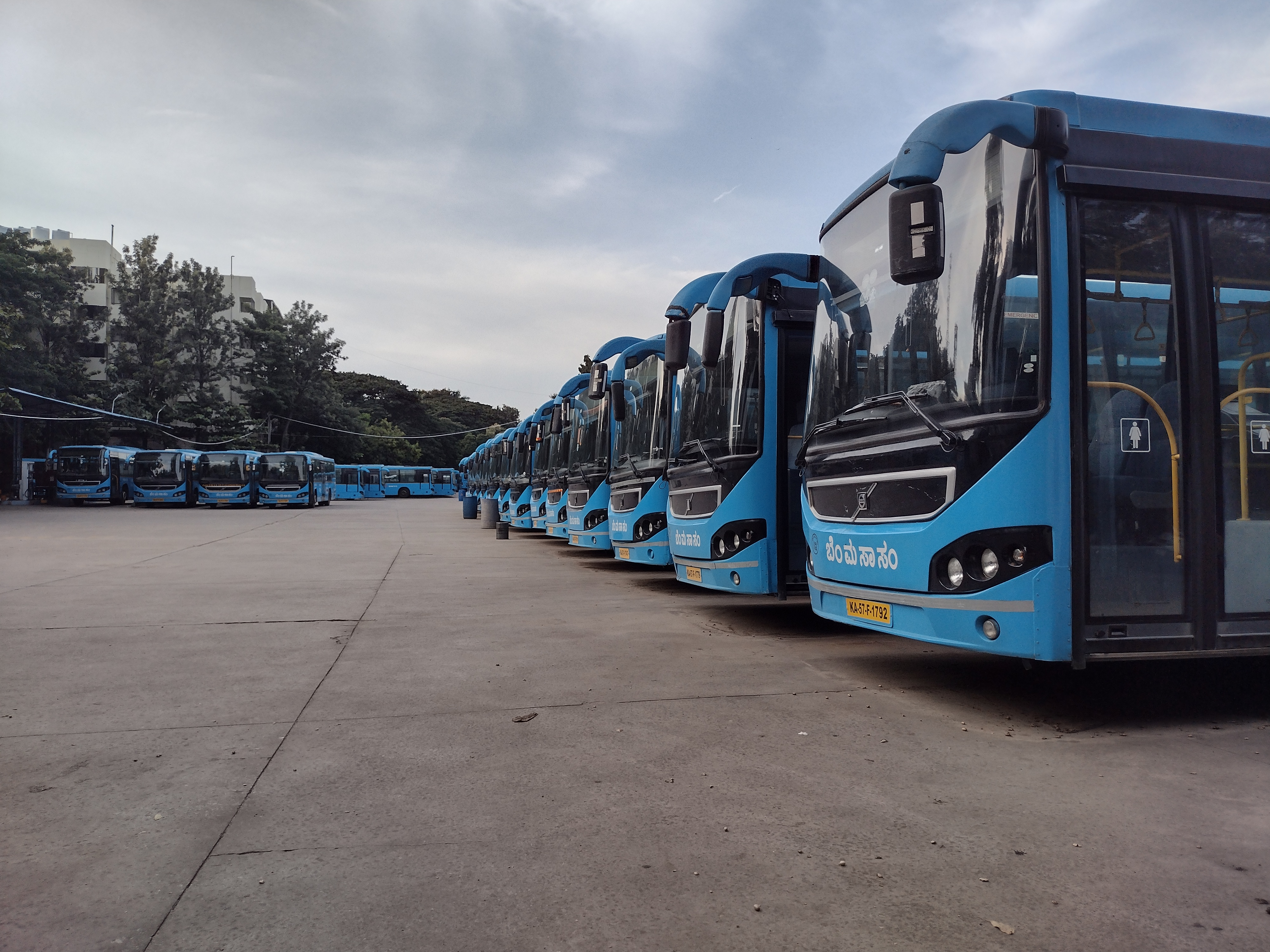
A BMTC air-conditioned Vajra bus

The Bangalore Metropolitan Transport Corporation (BMTC), established on 15 August 1997, is the primary public bus operator in Bengaluru, operating from 50 depots across the city. As of late 2025, BMTC's operating fleet stood at 7,067 buses — of which 1,799, approximately one in four, are electric vehicles — with over 5,700 individual routes. Daily ridership had recovered to approximately 48 lakh passengers by late 2025 — the highest of any city bus service in India — aided in part by the Karnataka government's Shakti scheme providing free travel for women. A record single-day ridership of 45.93 lakh was recorded on 21 June 2025.

BMTC's operating area extends roughly 25 km beyond the city's municipal boundary, covering most of Bengaluru Urban district together with parts of Bengaluru North and Bengaluru South districts — formerly Bengaluru Rural and Ramanagara districts respectively, renamed by the state cabinet in 2024 and 2025 — and a few destinations in Chikkaballapura district, which lies outside the Bengaluru Metropolitan Region altogether. In February 2026, BMTC announced plans to extend services to an 80 km radius, introducing direct routes from city terminals to outlying towns including Ramanagara, Kanakapura, Nelamangala, Hoskote, Devanahalli, and Doddaballapura, reducing the need for commuters in these areas to change buses multiple times to reach central Bengaluru.

BMTC has two major bus stations — Kempegowda Bus Station (Majestic) and Shivajinagar Bus Station — which serve as the primary intracity hubs, alongside Krishna Rajendra Market Bus Station (Kalasipalya) as an additional major terminal hub. The network is further supported by 27 minor bus stations — including a terminus at Kuvempunagara in BTM Layout — and 10 Traffic and Transit Management Centres (TTMCs) — including the Atal Bihari Vajpayee TTMC, Shanthinagar and the Dr. B. R. Ambedkar TTMC, Domlur, alongside others at Jayanagar, Kengeri, Banashankari TTMC, Koramangala, Yeshwanthapura, Vijayanagar, Whitefield, and Bannerghatta — which integrate bus services with park-and-ride, retail, and citizen amenity facilities. Service brands include Bengaluru Sarige(standard non-AC), Samparka (non-AC mini-buses for short distances), Astra (non-AC electric), Vajra (AC city buses), Vayu Vajra (AC airport shuttles to KIA), and Bengaluru Darshini (AC sightseeing). BMTC became the first state road transport undertaking in India to introduce air-conditioned intra-city buses, launching the Vajra service using Volvo B7R coaches in 2006.

The Volvo fleet that powered the Vajra and Vayu Vajra services for nearly two decades is being phased out under Gross Cost Contracts (GCCs). The first major tranche of 921 non-AC electric buses was supplied by TML Smart City Mobility Solutions (a Tata Motors subsidiary) beginning December 2023 at a contracted rate of ₹41.01 per kilometre — then the lowest GCC rate in India — with the BMTC receiving financial aid of ₹39.08 lakh per bus from DULT and the National Clean Air Programme (NCAP).

Under the central government's PM E-DRIVE (PM Electric Drive Revolution in Innovative Vehicle Enhancement) scheme, notified on 29 September 2024 with a national outlay of ₹4,391 crore, Bengaluru received an allocation of 4,500 electric buses — the largest for any Indian city under the scheme, ahead of Delhi (2,800) and Hyderabad (2,000). Once inductions under the scheme are complete — and accounting for annual retirements of approximately 10 per cent of the fleet — the total fleet is projected to surpass 10,000 buses, which would make Bengaluru the city with the largest urban bus fleet in India.

BMTC issues daily, monthly, and annual smart card passes; a 2019 survey found approximately 48 per cent of passengers travel on bus passes. The Namma BMTC app provides journey planning and live tracking; UPI-based fare payment grew from 8 per cent of transactions in December 2024 to 46 per cent by June 2025 — a pace of adoption with few parallels among Indian transit operators.

==== Taxis ====
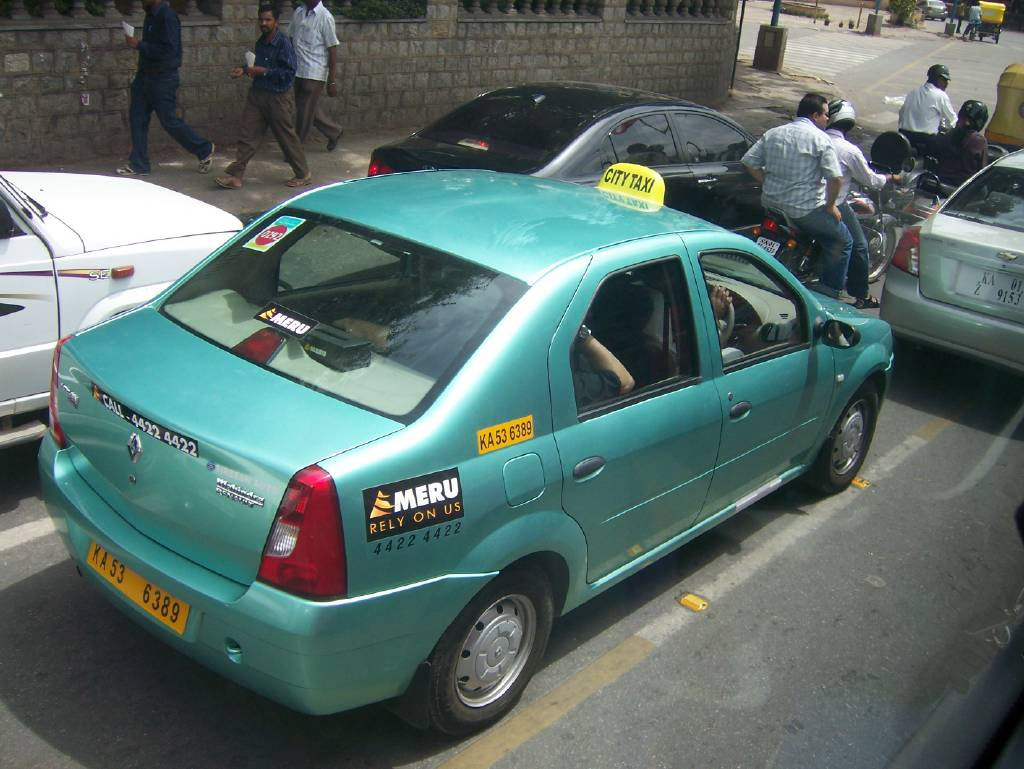
A taxi in Bengaluru.

Bengaluru has a large registered taxi fleet, bolstered substantially by app-based platforms. App-based ride-hailing platforms — principally Ola Cabs and Uber — dominate the market, having transformed point-to-point mobility since the mid-2010s. The market was previously served by Meru Cabs (from 2007) and KSTDC taxis (from 2009). While ride-hailing improved point-to-point connectivity, researchers and transport officials have identified it as a significant contributor to road congestion and a factor that dampened growth of BMTC and Namma Metro ridership during the late 2010s. Bike taxis have been attempted by several operators but remain prohibited; the Karnataka transport department has maintained that they do not comply with state motor vehicle rules.

==== Auto rickshaws ====
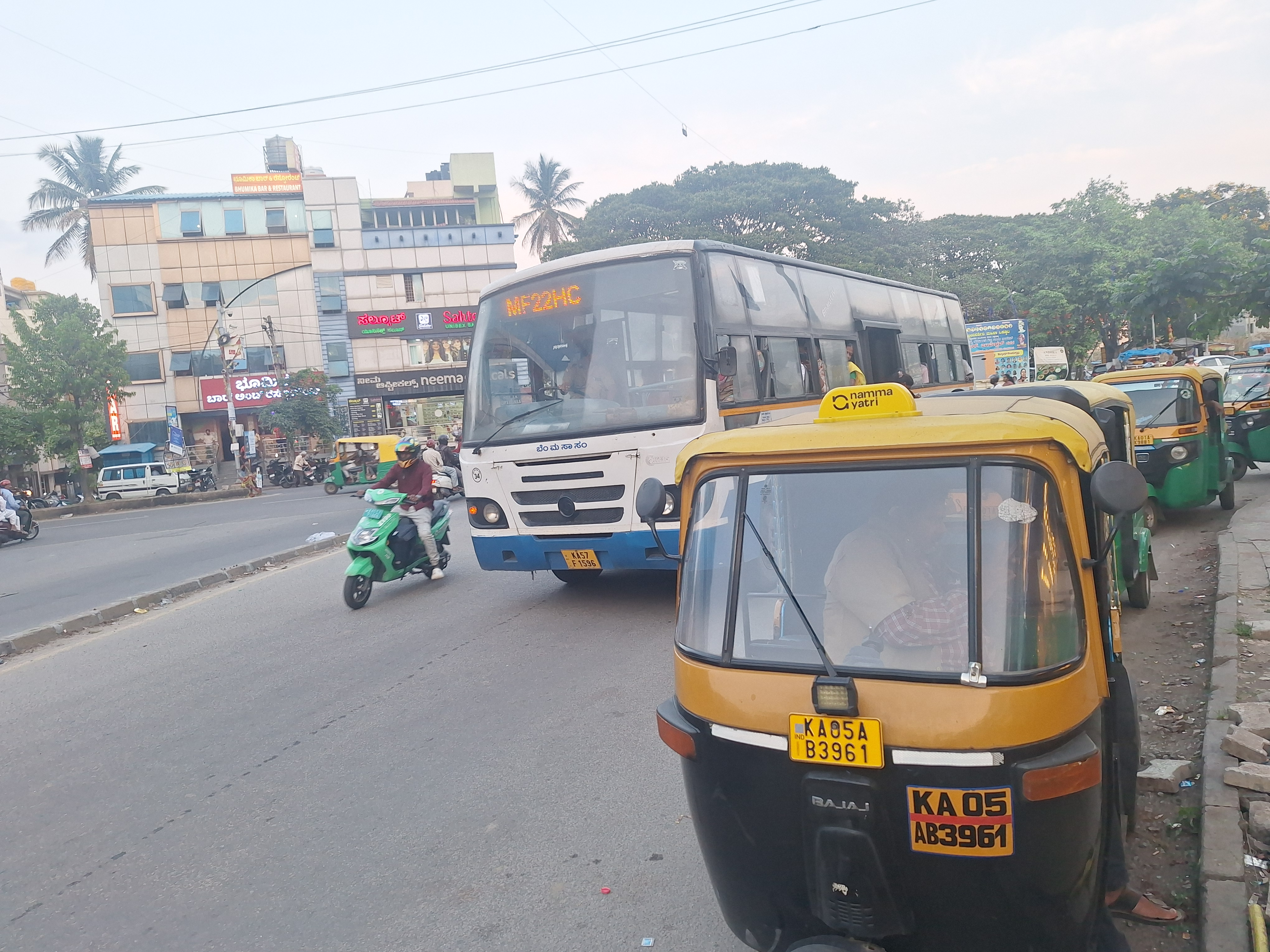
Old auto rickshaw with namma yatri signboard next to bmtc bus in Vijaya bank layout

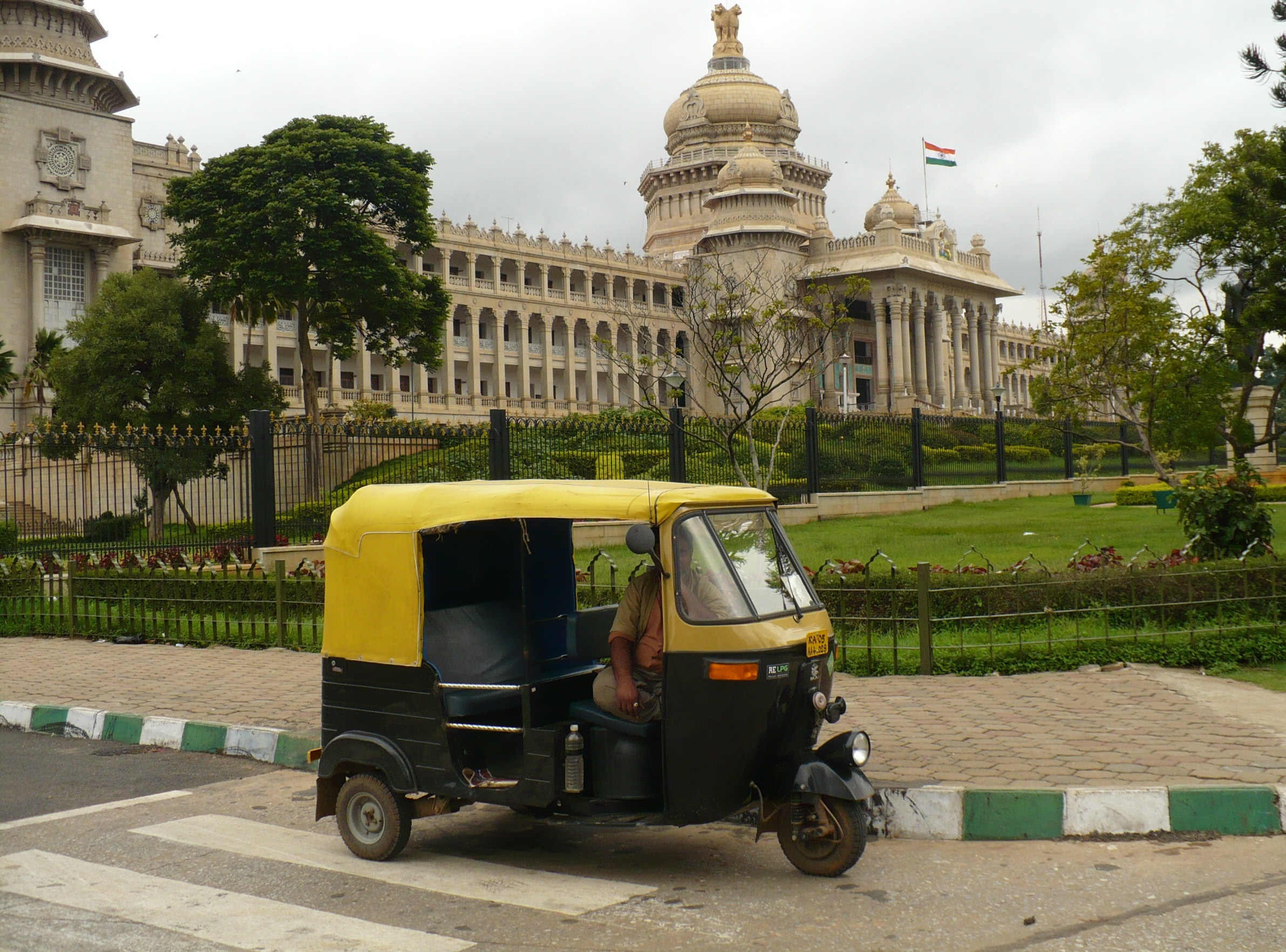
An auto rickshaw in front of the Vidhana Soudha.

Auto rickshaws remain an essential mode of short-distance transport throughout Bengaluru. As of 2019, the city had approximately 1.94 lakh auto rickshaws. App-based hailing through Ola Auto and Uber Auto has grown substantially since Bengaluru became the first Indian city to offer the service in 2014. The city permits CNG- and battery-powered e-autorickshaws. Smaller North Indian-style e-rickshaws remain prohibited, as the Bengaluru Traffic Police has maintained their lower maximum speeds would impede mixed traffic flow.

==== Cycling and pedestrian infrastructure ====
Bengaluru has limited dedicated cycling infrastructure despite an aspiration, set out in DULT's Non-Motorised Transport (NMT) Policy, to build a 600-km cycling network by 2035. A cycle track pilot was introduced along select corridors including stretches of the Outer Ring Road, but uptake has been constrained by the absence of a connected network and poor road-safety conditions for cyclists. Footpaths in many areas are encroached upon by parked vehicles and street vendors, making pedestrian movement difficult. BMRCL has improved pedestrian plazas and footpath infrastructure around Phase 2 metro station entrances, but a city-wide pedestrian network adequate for the density of walking trips has not been realised.

=== Last-mile connectivity ===
The absence of reliable last-mile access to metro and suburban rail stations is consistently identified — by commuter surveys, academic studies, and policy bodies — as the primary barrier preventing modal shift from private vehicles to public transport in Bengaluru.

BMTC operates feeder bus services to major metro stations, though coverage is uneven and frequency often insufficient for peak-hour demand. App-based shared micro-mobility plays an increasingly important role: Yulu, the largest electric micro-mobility operator in Bengaluru, deploys over 15,000 vehicles — primarily e-bicycles and e-scooters — and records approximately one lakh daily rides, operating in proximity to several metro corridors and tech campuses. BMRCL has worked with auto-aggregators to provide organised last-mile service at key interchange stations. Despite these efforts, a systemic last-mile solution — integrating feeder buses, cycling infrastructure, and organised paratransit into a unified, ticketed network — has not been implemented at scale, and the absence of a common ticketing system across BMTC, Namma Metro, and the suburban rail project remains a widely cited structural deficiency.

=== Metro rail ===
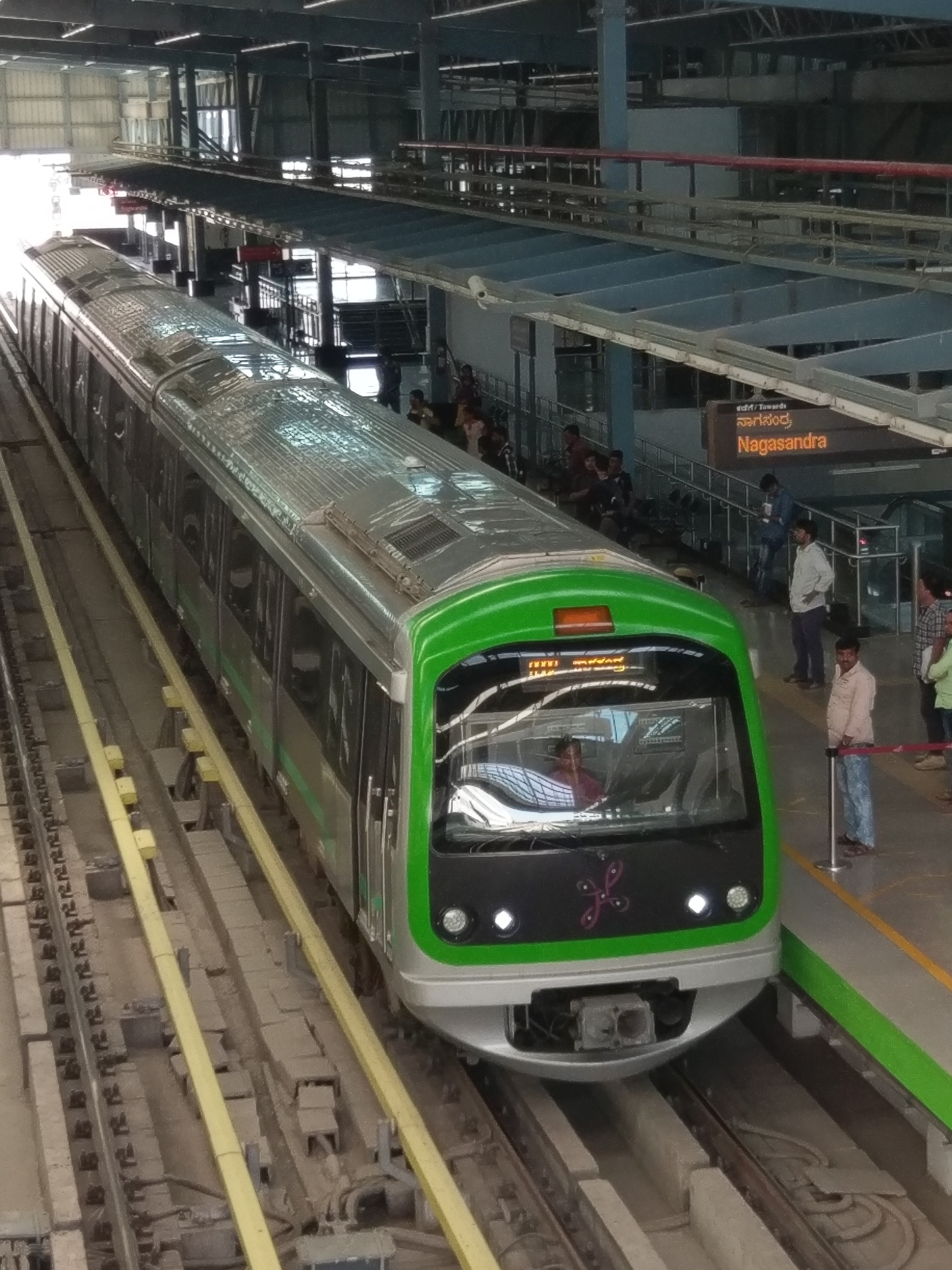
A Namma Metro train on the Green Line.

Namma Metro (officially the Bengaluru Metro) is the city's rapid transit system, operated by the Bangalore Metro Rail Corporation Limited (BMRCL). Construction began in 2008, and commercial operations commenced on 20 October 2011 on the initial segment of the Purple Line, making Bengaluru the fifth Indian city to operate a metro rail system. As of 2025–26, the network spans 96.10 km across three lines with 83 stations, using standard gauge (1,435 mm) track with 750 V DC third-rail electrification throughout.

Average daily ridership reached 9.16 lakh in April 2026 — more than double the 4.5 lakh average recorded in 2019. The all-time single-day ridership record of 10,48,031 was set on 11 August 2025 — the first time the network exceeded one million boardings in a single day, set the day after the Yellow Line opened. Trains run as six-car formations with a total passenger capacity of 2,004 per train. Train maintenance depots are located at Baiyappanahalli (Purple Line), Peenya (Green Line), and Hebbagodi (Yellow Line).

Following the February 2025 fare revision, ticket prices range from a minimum of ₹10 for journeys up to 2 km to a maximum of ₹90 for the longest journeys, representing a net average increase of around 45–46 per cent after discounts; the revision followed recommendations of the first Fare Fixation Committee constituted under the Metro Railways (Operation and Maintenance) Act, 2002, and an initial steeper increase on some routes was capped at 71.43 per cent after public protests. Annual fare escalations of up to 5 per cent are planned from 2026 onwards under the committee's recommendations, with holders of the Namma Metro Card smart card continuing to receive a discount on every journey. The National Common Mobility Card (NCMC) — a RuPay-based open-loop card that is also valid on BMTC buses — is accepted for fare payment at all stations, representing an early step toward an integrated ticketing system across the city's public transport modes.

Financial sustainability has been an ongoing challenge for BMRCL, which historically operated at a deficit before the network's ridership base matured. In FY 2023–24, BMRCL reported an operational profit of approximately ₹129–130 crore alongside more than 23 crore passenger journeys, which the corporation's leadership presented as evidence that ridership growth following the Phase 2 extensions had improved the network's revenue position. The February 2025 fare revision was driven in part by the need to bring fare-box revenue closer to operating costs after a gap of roughly seven and a half years since the previous revision. BMRCL's managing director J. Ravishankar has committed to expanding the network to 175 km by 2027 and 225 km by 2030, with train frequencies tightening to 4–6 minutes across the system.

==== Operational lines ====
Phase 1 established the network's two original lines. The Purple Line (East–West Corridor) opened its initial stretch on 20 October 2011 and now runs 43.49 km between Challaghatta and Whitefield (Kadugodi) through 37 stations, including a deep underground section through the city centre. The Green Line (North–South Corridor), opened on 1 March 2014, spans 33.46 km between Silk Institute and Madavara through 32 stations. Both lines intersect at Nadaprabhu Kempegowda Station, Majestic — the system's main underground interchange and Bengaluru's busiest transit hub. Phase 2 extended the Purple Line westward to Challaghatta (October 2023) and the Green Line northward to Madavara (November 2024) and southward to Silk Institute.

The Yellow Line (19.15 km, 16 stations) was inaugurated by Prime Minister Narendra Modi on 10 August 2025, with commercial passenger services beginning the following day. The fully elevated corridor, built with rolling stock manufactured by CRRC Nanjing Puzhen and assembled by Titagarh Rail Systems, runs south from Rashtreeya Vidyalaya Road (interchange with Green Line) through Ragigudda, Jayadeva Hospital, BTM Layout, Central Silk Board, Bommanahalli, Hongasandra, Kudlu Gate, Singasandra, Hosa Road, Beratena Agrahara, Electronic City (near the NICE Road Junction), Infosys Foundation Konappana Agrahara (near the Electronic City Toll Gate on Hosur Road), Huskur Road, and Biocon Hebbagodi, terminating at Delta Electronics Bommasandra. It connects to the Green Line at Rashtreeya Vidyalaya Road and is designed for future interchange with the Pink Line at Jayadeva Hospital and the Blue Line at Central Silk Board.

Operational Lines
No.	Line name	Terminals		Stations	Distance (km)	Opening date	Last extension
1	Purple	Challaghatta	Whitefield (Kadugodi)	37	43.49 km (27.02 mi)	20 October 2011	9 October 2023
2	Green	Silk Institute	Madavara	32	33.46 km (20.79 mi)	1 March 2014	7 November 2024
3	Yellow	Rashtreeya Vidyalaya Road	Delta Electronics Bommasandra	16	19.15 km (11.90 mi)	11 August 2025	
Total				83	96.10 km (59.71 mi)		

==== Lines under construction ====
The Pink Line (Kalena Agrahara–Nagawara, 21.25 km, 18 stations) is a Phase 2 corridor under construction since 2017. It includes elevated and underground sections, with a depot at Kothanur. Construction was repeatedly delayed by land acquisition disputes, contractor disputes, and tunnelling challenges. A phased opening is projected for August 2026 (Phase 1) and December 2026 (Phase 2). Jayadeva Hospital is designed as a multi-level interchange node shared with the Yellow Line.

The Blue Line (Central Silk Board–KIAL Terminals, 58.19 km, 29 stations) is Bengaluru's longest planned metro corridor and the future airport metro link. Phase 2A (Central Silk Board to Krishnarajapura, 9 stations) targets December 2026, while Phase 2B (Krishnarajapura to KIAL Terminals) is expected in December 2027. It will integrate with the Purple Line at Krishnarajapura and substantially relieve the ORR road corridor.

Lines Under Construction
No.	Line name	Terminals		Stations	Distance (km)	Expected opening
1	Pink	Kalena Agrahara	Nagawara	18	21.25 km (13.20 mi)	Phase 1: August 2026; Phase 2: December 2026
2	Blue	Central Silk Board	KIAL Terminals	29	58.19 km (36.16 mi)	Phase 2A: December 2026; Phase 2B: December 2027
Total				47	79.44 km (49.36 mi)	

==== Approved and planned lines ====
Three Phase 3 corridors have been approved by the central government: the Red Line (Hebbala–Sarjapura, 37 km, 28 stations), which includes a 14.45 km underground section linking north and south-east Bengaluru; the Orange Line (Kempapura–JP Nagar 4th Phase, 32.15 km, 22 stations); and the Grey Line (Hosahalli–Kadabagere, 12.5 km, 9 stations), a western spur. All three are targeted for completion between 2029 and 2030.

Approved / Planned Lines
No.	Line name	Terminals		Stations	Distance (km)	Target
1	Orange	Kempapura	JP Nagar 4th Phase	22	32.15 km (19.98 mi)	2029
2	Grey	Hosahalli	Kadabagere	9	12.5 km (7.8 mi)	2029
3	Red	Hebbala	Sarjapura	28	37 km (23 mi)	2030
Total				59	81.65 km (50.73 mi)	

=== Commuter / Suburban rail ===
Bengaluru is served by the South Western Railway zone of Indian Railways through a network of terminal and halt stations. A dedicated 148.17 km commuter rail network — the Bengaluru Suburban Rail Project (BSRP) — is under construction, to be operated by K-RIDE (Rail Infrastructure Development Company (Karnataka) Limited), a joint venture between the Government of Karnataka and the Ministry of Railways. The project was approved by the central government in October 2020 at a sanctioned cost of ₹15,767 crore and its foundation stone was laid by Prime Minister Narendra Modi on 20 June 2022. Corridors 1 and 3 are funded in part by a €500 million loan from Germany's KfW Development Bank, signed in December 2023. When complete, the BSRP is expected to carry 9.84 lakh passengers daily.

The project comprises four corridors named after Kannada flowers: the Sampige Line (Corridor 1, KSR Bengaluru City to Kempegowda International Airport via Yelahanka); the Mallige Line (Corridor 2, Baiyappanahalli to Chikkabanavara, 25.01 km — the most advanced corridor, with active civil construction underway); the Parijaata Line (Corridor 3, Kengeri to Whitefield); and the Kanaka Line (Corridor 4, Heelalige to Rajanukunte via KR Puram). Together the four corridors form the acronym Sa-m-par-ka (Sampige, Mallige, Parijaata, Kanaka), the Kannada word for connectivity. Five interchange stations will be shared between corridors: Bengaluru City (C1 & C3), Yesvantpur (C1 & C2), Lottegollahalli (C1 & C2), Yelahanka (C1 & C4), and Benniganahalli (C2 & C4).

Bengaluru Suburban Railway – Corridors
No.	Line name	Terminals		Stations	Distance (km)	Status	Target
1	Sampige	KSR Bengaluru City	Devanahalli	15	41.40 km (25.72 mi)	Approved – tendering	2028
2	Mallige	Baiyappanahalli	Chikkabanavara	14	25.01 km (15.54 mi)	Under construction (priority)	December 2026
3	Parijaata	Kengeri	Whitefield	12	35.20 km (21.87 mi)	Approved – lower priority	2028
4	Kanaka	Heelalige	Rajanukunte	23	47.70 km (29.64 mi)	Under construction	March 2027
Total				64	149.35 km (92.80 mi)		

The project has seen repeated timeline revisions. The original 40-month deadline of October 2025, promised by Prime Minister Modi at the foundation stone laying, proved unachievable, and the current official target is December 2026 for the Mallige and Kanaka lines, with the full network expected by 2027–28. K-RIDE is also undertaking a pre-feasibility study for a BSRP Phase 2 that could span approximately 452 km and connect nearby satellite towns.

==== Indian Railways terminal and halt stations ====
The existing Indian Railways network connects Bengaluru to destinations across India. KSR Bengaluru City (SBC), with ten platforms, is the city's principal long-distance terminal and handles the highest volume of originating trains, including flagship services such as the Shatabdi Express and Lalbagh Express to Chennai, the Udyan Express to Mumbai, and the Rajdhani Express to Delhi. Yesvantpur Junction (YPR) serves as the second major originating terminal, handling superfast and express departures including services to Kolkata and the Northeast. Sir M. Visvesvaraya Terminal (SMVB), inaugurated on 11 June 2022, was purpose-built to reduce terminal congestion at SBC by originating services on several key corridors that formerly operated from the already-saturated SBC. Bengaluru Cantonment (BNC) is an important halt on the Chennai–Bengaluru main line. Vande Bharat Express services from Bengaluru include trains to Ernakulam (launched November 2025) and Belagavi (launched August 2025).

Railway Stations in Bengaluru
Station	Platforms	Code	Zone	Metro connection
Terminal stations
KSR Bengaluru City	10	SBC	SWR	Yes (Purple Line)
Yesvantpur Junction	6	YPR	SWR	Yes (Green Line)
Bengaluru Cantonment	7	BNC	SWR	No
Sir M. Visvesvaraya Terminal	7	SMVB	SWR	No
Yelahanka Junction	3	YNK	SWR	No
Halt stations
Krishnarajapura	4	KJM	SWR	Purple Line + Blue Line (UC)
Banaswadi	3	BAND	SWR	No
Kengeri	4	KGI	SWR	Yes (Purple Line)
Baiyappanahalli	2	BYPL	SWR	Yes (Purple Line)
Bengaluru East	2	BNCE	SWR	No
Hoodi Halt	2	HDIH	SWR	No
Kempegowda International Airport Halt	1	KIAD	SWR	Planned (Blue Line)
Jnanabharathi Halt	2	GNB	SWR	Yes (Purple Line)
Nayandahalli	4	NYH	SWR	No
Malleshwaram	2	MWM	SWR	No
Lottegollahalli	2	LOGH	SWR	No
Kodigehalli	2	KDGH	SWR	No
Whitefield	4	WFD	SWR	No
Hebbal	2	HEB	SWR	Planned (Blue Line)
Bellandur Road	1	BLRR	SWR	No
Karmelaram	2	CRLM	SWR	No
Chikkabanavara	5	BAW	SWR	No
Nelamangala	2	NMGA	SWR	No

=== Road safety ===
Road safety is a significant public health concern in Bengaluru. In 2023, the city recorded 894 fatal crashes resulting in 921 deaths — the highest fatality count since 2007 and a 16-year high — according to the Bengaluru Traffic Police (BTP) 2023 Road Safety Report, produced in collaboration with the Johns Hopkins International Injury Research Unit and Vital Strategies under the Bloomberg Philanthropies Initiative for Global Road Safety. Pedestrians, motorcyclists, and cyclists together accounted for 91 per cent of those fatalities, reflecting the structural vulnerability of non-motorised and two-wheeled road users in a city where footpaths and cycling infrastructure remain inadequate. The BTP identified 43 blackspots and 24 high-risk corridors, with northern Bengaluru housing three of the five most dangerous corridors and accounting for over one-third of all road deaths.

In 2024, total road crashes declined marginally to 4,784 (from 4,974 in 2023), with 893 deaths and 4,052 injuries. Pedestrian fatalities fell by 19 per cent, from 287 to 233, which authorities attributed to stricter enforcement, blackspot rectification, and improved emergency response. Self-caused crashes — arising from reckless or negligent driving — accounted for 212 deaths, up slightly from 209 in 2023. During the year, 23,574 drivers were caught under the influence of alcohol, a 10.6 per cent decrease from the previous year. In 2024, the BTP registered 82.86 lakh traffic offence cases, of which 78.07 lakh were detected through contactless means — ITMS cameras, social media, and the Public Eye platform — collecting ₹80.9 crore in fines.

== Intercity ==
=== Buses ===
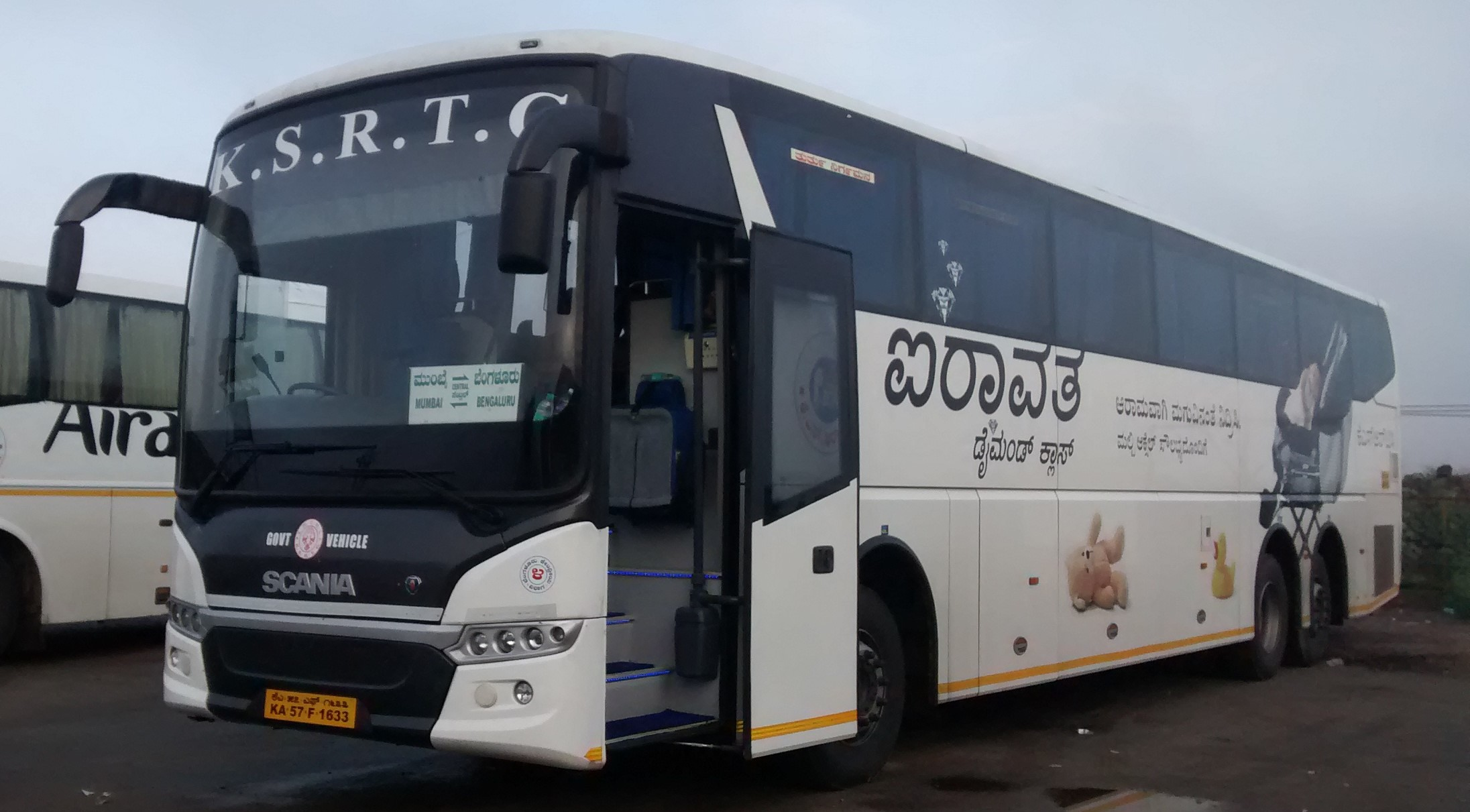
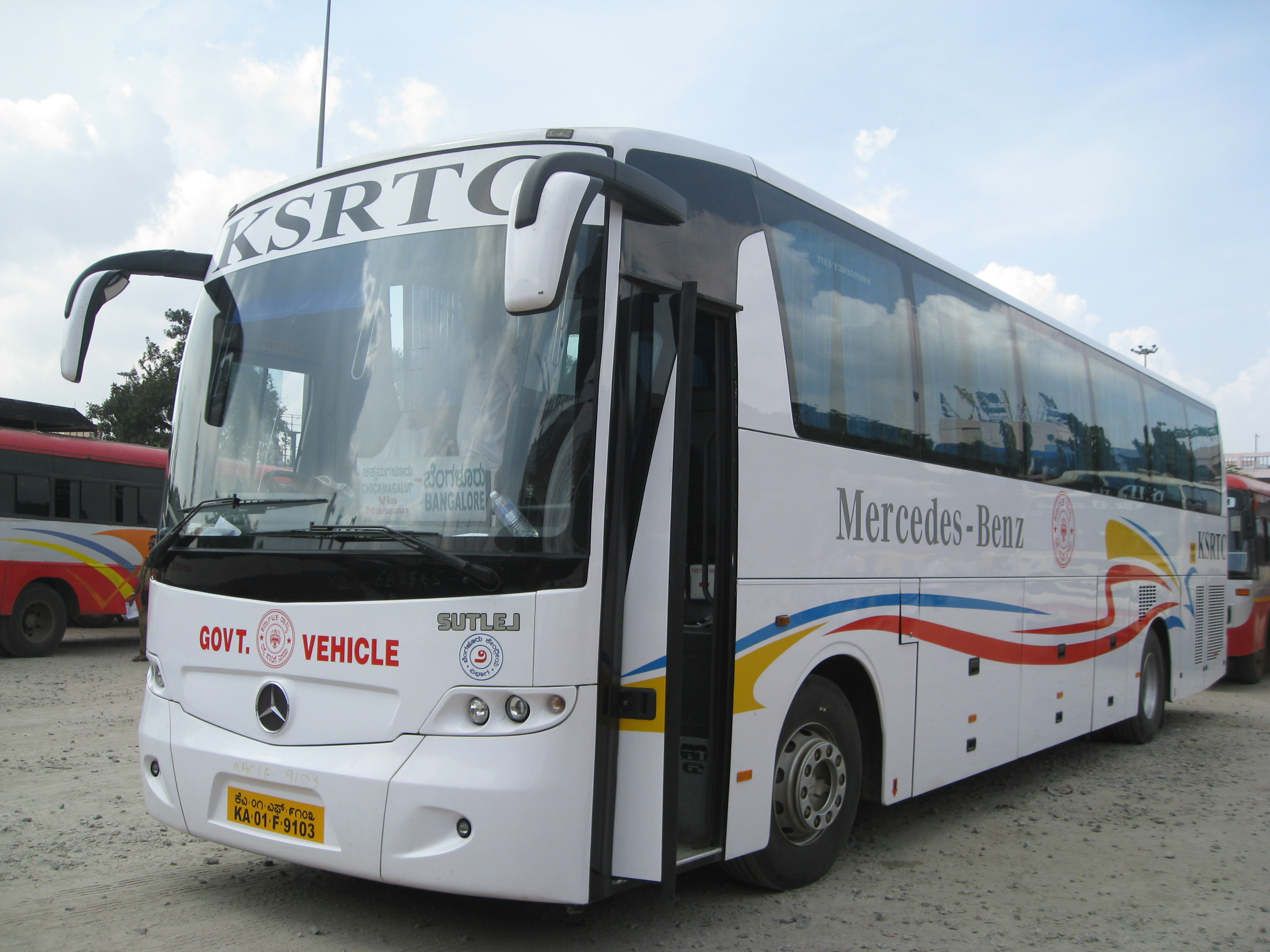
KSRTC Airavat Club Class Scania semi-sleeper (left) and Mercedes-Benz semi-sleeper (right)

Bengaluru is the headquarters of the Karnataka State Road Transport Corporation (KSRTC), which, together with its sister corporations North Western Karnataka Road Transport Corporation (NWKRTC) and Kalyana Karnataka Road Transport Corporation (KKRTC), operates an extensive intercity bus network across Karnataka and to neighbouring states. KSRTC runs 179 bus stations across Karnataka. A 2012 survey found more than 6,000 corporation buses and around 2,000 private buses operating daily from Bengaluru; the combined total has grown substantially since.

KSRTC was the first state RTC to introduce air-conditioned intercity services, launching the Airavat brand in 2002–03. Service classes range from the non-AC Karnataka Sarige (ordinary seater) to multi-axle premium sleeper coaches. Current AC offerings include Airavat Club Class (semi-sleeper, Volvo, Scania, and Mercedes-Benz); Airavat Club Class 2.0 (Volvo 9600 series, launched December 2024, 25 units as of mid-2025); Ambaari Class and Ambaari Dream Class (sleeper and Volvo sleeper); Ambaari Utsav Class (premium Volvo sleeper); Ashwamedha Classic Class (non-AC Ashok Leyland, launched 5 February 2024 for Dakshina Karnataka routes);Pallakki Class(Non-ac premium sleeper bus) and Rajahamsa Executive Class (non-AC semi-sleeper and sleeper).

==== Bus stations ====
Bengaluru has four principal intercity bus stations, with route allocations divided by destination geography:

- Kempegowda Bus Station (Majestic) — Karnataka (except Mysore and Kodagu district services); Andhra Pradesh; Telangana; Maharashtra; Goa
- Mysuru Road Bus Station — Karnataka (Mysore and Kodagu districts); Tamil Nadu (except luxury express and Hosur services); Kerala; Puducherry (except luxury express)
- Atal Bihari Vajpayee TTMC (Shanthinagara) — functions as both a BMTC intracity Traffic and Transit Management Centre and an intercity hub for Tamil Nadu (luxury express only), Andhra Pradesh (Old Madras Road services), and Puducherry (luxury express)
- Krishna Rajendra Market Bus Station (Kalasipalya) — Bangalore Urban, Rural, Chikkaballapur, and Kolar districts; Tamil Nadu (Hosur services only)

=== Rail ===
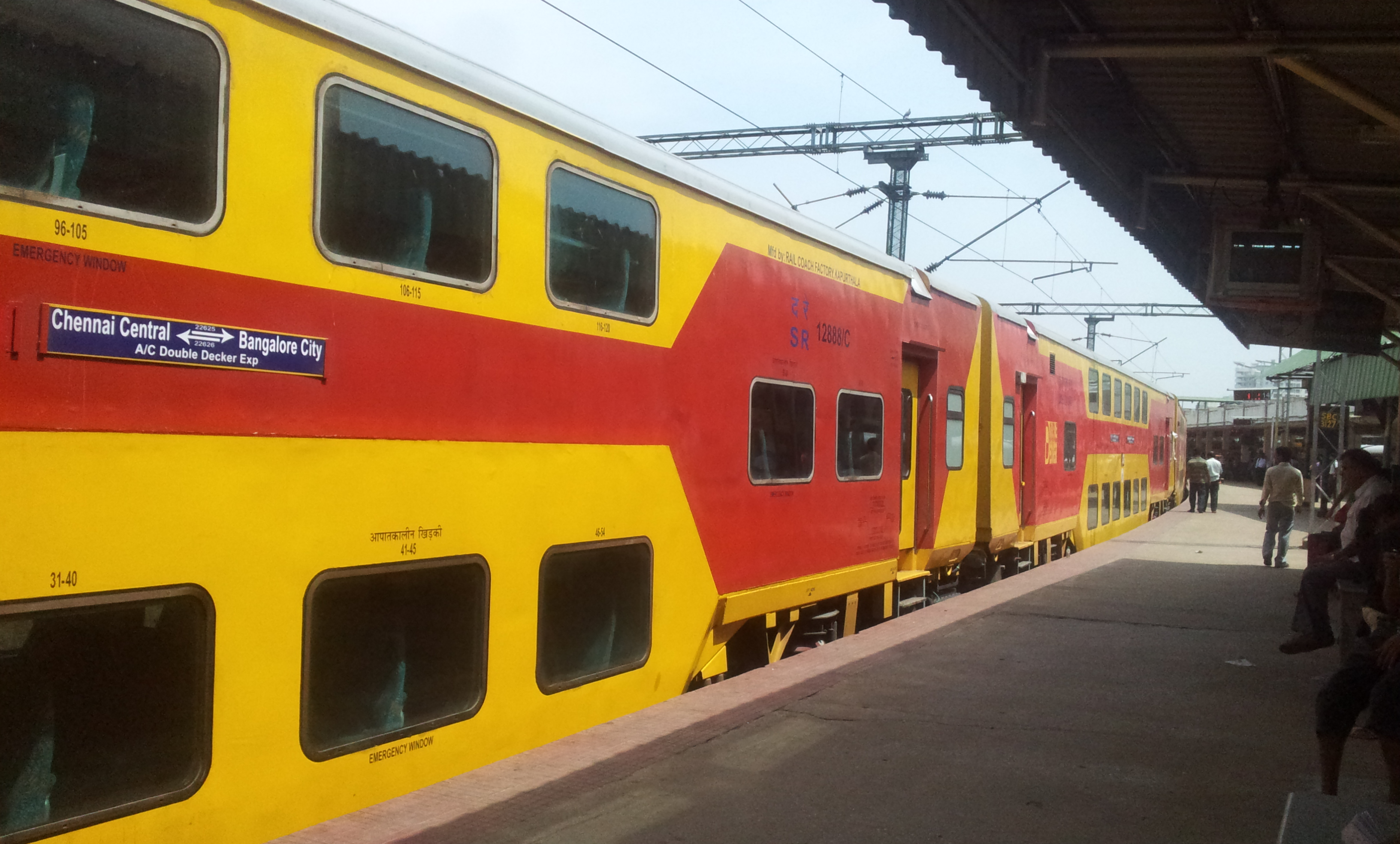
The double-decker express service between Bengaluru and Chennai.

Bengaluru falls within the South Western Railway zone of Indian Railways, headquartered at Hubballi. KSR Bengaluru City (SBC) handles the highest volume of originating trains, including the Shatabdi Express to Chennai, Udyan Express to Mumbai, and Rajdhani Express to Delhi. Yesvantpur Junction (YPR) originates many superfast and express services to destinations including Kolkata and the Northeast. Sir M. Visvesvaraya Terminal (SMVB), inaugurated on 11 June 2022, was purpose-built to decongest SBC and originates services on several key corridors. Bengaluru Cantonment (BNC) is an important halt on the Chennai–Bengaluru main line.

=== Air ===
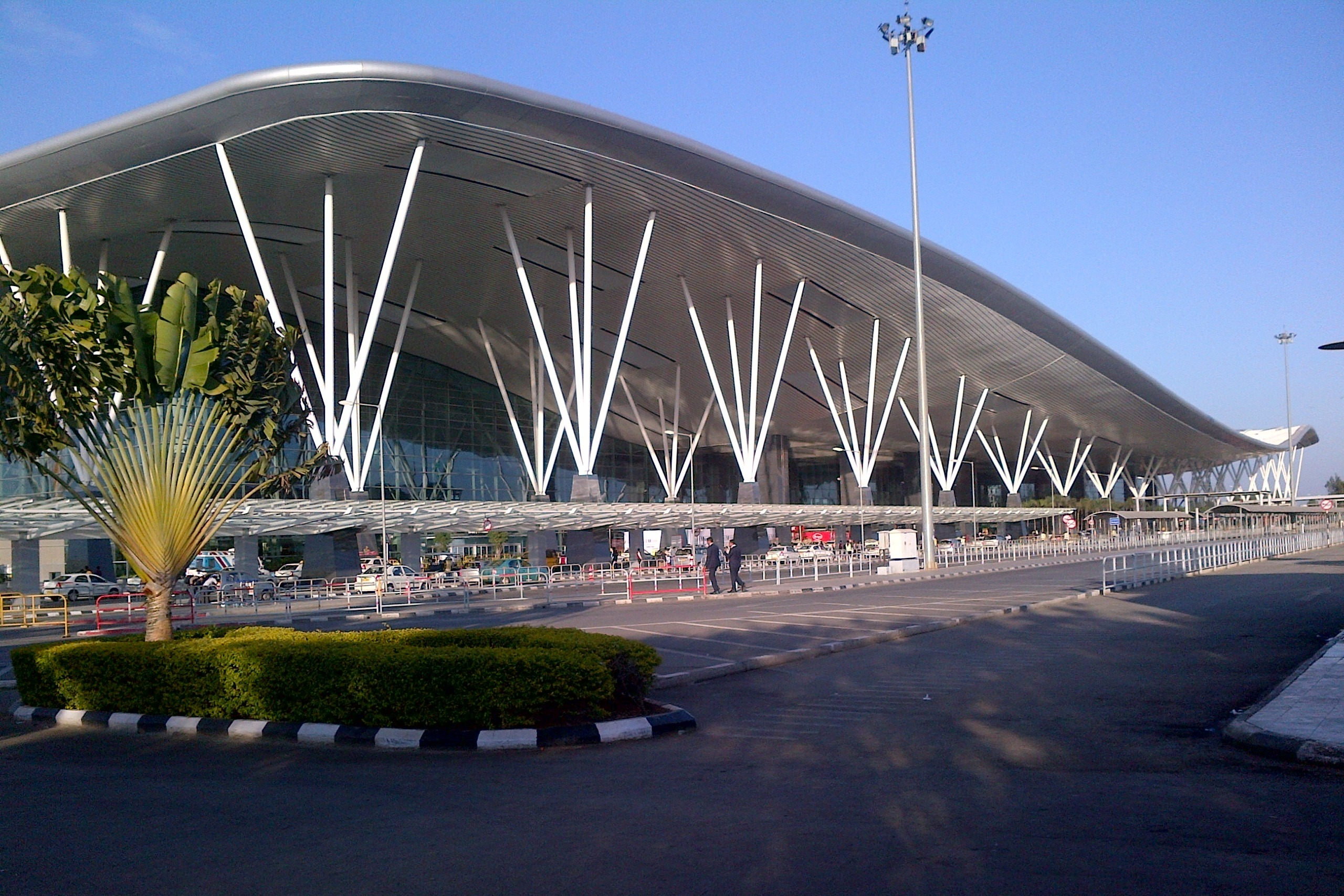
Kempegowda International Airport

Kempegowda International Airport (IATA: BLR, ICAO: VOBL), located approximately 35–40 km north of the city centre near Devanahalli on NH 44, is India's third-busiest airport by passenger traffic. It was commissioned on 24 May 2008, replacing the capacity-constrained HAL Airport, and is operated by Bangalore International Airport Limited (BIAL) under a public-private partnership. In 2024–25, the airport handled 41.88 million passengers — a year-on-year increase of 11.6 per cent — averaging 1.15 lakh passengers per day across its two terminals, alongside 500,000 metric tonnes of cargo (including a 21 per cent growth in international freight).

The airport has two operational terminals. Terminal 1 (T1) handles primarily domestic operations and has a capacity of approximately 25 million passengers annually. Terminal 2 (T2), inaugurated by Prime Minister Narendra Modi in November 2022 at a cost of approximately ₹5,000 crore, raised the airport's combined annual capacity to around 60 million passengers and includes an integrated underground bus station with 12 platforms for BMTC Vayu Vajra services. International operations shifted fully to T2 from September 2023. T2 is designed around a "walk in the garden" concept, incorporating over 10,000 sq m of green walls, hanging gardens, and outdoor gardens, and operates on 100 per cent renewable energy.

BIAL has planned a Phase 2 expansion of T2 adding 2.78 lakh square metres of space, 40 additional apron stands, and a 28,000 sq m inter-terminal walkway, targeted for completion by 2028, which will raise annual capacity beyond 85 million passengers. A third terminal (T3) is in planning, with a potential capacity of 110 million passengers annually; Karnataka is also exploring a second greenfield airport for the city, with multiple sites under consideration. Total investments of ₹17,000 crore are planned by BIAL by 2029 across airside, landside, and terminal infrastructure.

Surface connectivity to the airport is provided primarily by BMTC's Vayu Vajra air-conditioned bus service, which operates 24 hours a day from major hubs including Kempegowda Bus Station (Majestic), Banashankari, Silk Board, and Hebbal, with buses departing approximately every 30 minutes. BMTC has been replacing the ageing Volvo coaches on this route with a fleet of 83 air-conditioned electric buses. App-based taxis are also widely used, though journey times can exceed two hours during peak traffic. A dedicated railway halt, the Kempegowda International Airport Halt (KIAD), exists on the Indian Railways network within the airport campus. Under Namma Metro Phase 2B, the Blue Line (Central Silk Board–KIAL Terminals) will provide a direct metro link to an integrated station at T2, with an expected opening in December 2027; once operational, the line is projected to connect the airport to the city's metro network in under 60 minutes.

== Freight and logistics ==
Bengaluru is a significant node in South India's logistics network, with road-based freight dominating the movement of goods to and from the city. The Whitefield Satellite Goods Terminal (SGWF) on the eastern periphery handles rail freight for the manufacturing and IT clusters in the Whitefield and EPIP Zone areas. Major arterial roads — including NH 44 (towards Chennai and Hyderabad), NH 48 (towards Mumbai), and NH 275 (towards Mysuru) — carry the bulk of intercity freight, and large warehousing clusters have developed along Hosur Road, Tumkur Road, and the Nelamangala corridor. As of 2026, no dedicated urban freight rail service operates within the city.

== Challenges and policy ==
Bengaluru's transport challenges are interlinked and mutually reinforcing. The central structural problem is a severe mismatch between the pace of private vehicle growth — which adds approximately 2,000 new vehicles per day — and the pace of public transport expansion and road infrastructure investment. The consequences include road congestion that costs the average commuter approximately 117 hours annually, road fatalities that spiked to a 16-year high in 2023, and carbon emissions from a transport sector in which private vehicles account for 80 per cent of all trips.

The 2025–26 state Economic Survey formally proposed examining congestion pricing — a charge on vehicles entering high-traffic corridors at peak times, drawing comparisons to the London Congestion Charge. The proposal acknowledges that pricing measures alone are insufficient; Transport Minister Ramalinga Reddy has stated that road widening, parking charges, and odd-even vehicle rules are all under evaluation, but that any such intervention must be paired with a substantive improvement in public transport supply.

DULT's Comprehensive Mobility Plan and Transit-Oriented Development (TOD) Policy represent the primary policy framework for rebalancing modal share. The TOD Policy aims to house 60 per cent of Bengaluru's population within designated TOD zones, with FARs of 300–500 per cent around metro stations to concentrate density at transit nodes, and a proposed 600-km cycling network by 2035. The overall public transport modal share target is 70 per cent by 2030 — against the current baseline of approximately 20–25 per cent.

The Namma Yatri MadeForBLR: Namma Mobility Blueprint 2030 white paper (2024) proposed a 10-point agenda including a 70 per cent public transport share, a 50 per cent cut in commute time and emissions, improved first- and last-mile access, and a common ticketing system across all public transport modes. It drew lessons from five global cities that managed comparable modal shift challenges.

A recurring governance challenge is the fragmentation of planning and delivery across too many agencies — DULT, BMLTA, BDA, BMRDA, NHAI, GBA, Traffic Police, BMTC, BMRCL, and K-RIDE — without a sufficiently empowered unified authority to arbitrate between them. The BMLTA Act was intended to fill this gap, but as of early 2026, the authority remained not fully constituted more than three years after the legislation was passed, and critics note it was not consulted on major projects such as the proposed 18-km Bengaluru tunnel road.

A long-standing demand from commuters and transit advocates has been for integrated ticketing — a single card or QR code usable across BMTC buses and Namma Metro, removing the need for separate fare media on each mode. This has been piloted through the National Common Mobility Card (NCMC), a RuPay-based open-loop smart card, which gained full interoperability across BMTC and BMRCL networks during 2025–26, representing one of the few concrete steps toward the common ticketing system envisaged by both the BMLTA Act and the MadeForBLR blueprint.

Bus station infrastructure is also undergoing expansion. A 2024 Directorate of Urban Land Transport (DULT) review found that BMTC's Traffic and Transit Management Centre (TTMC) programme envisages 45 terminals city-wide, of which only 10 had been completed, with five further TTMCs under public-private-partnership tender. The same review identified design shortcomings at completed TTMCs, including inadequate bus-bay dwell time and poor pedestrian connectivity to adjacent metro stations. Separately, the Karnataka government's 2025–26 budget announced a new satellite bus station for KR Puram in East Bengaluru to be built under a PPP model, and KSRTC has appointed a consultancy to study a ₹1,500 crore redevelopment of Kempegowda Bus Station (Majestic) — under which the existing BMTC and KSRTC structures on the 32-acre site would be demolished and rebuilt as an integrated transport hub linking the bus station, KSR Bengaluru City railway station, the Majestic metro interchange, and the future suburban rail interchange. As of the report's appointment in November 2025, the redevelopment remained at the planning stage, with tenders for a private partner expected in the latter half of 2026.

== See also ==
- Namma Metro
- Bangalore Metropolitan Transport Corporation
- Karnataka State Road Transport Corporation
- Bengaluru Suburban Rail Project
- Kempegowda International Airport
- Outer Ring Road, Bengaluru
- Peripheral Ring Road
- Electronic City Elevated Expressway
- Greater Bengaluru Authority
- Infrastructure in Bengaluru
