= Biocon Hebbagodi metro station =

Namma Metro's Yellow Line metro station

Biocon Hebbagodi
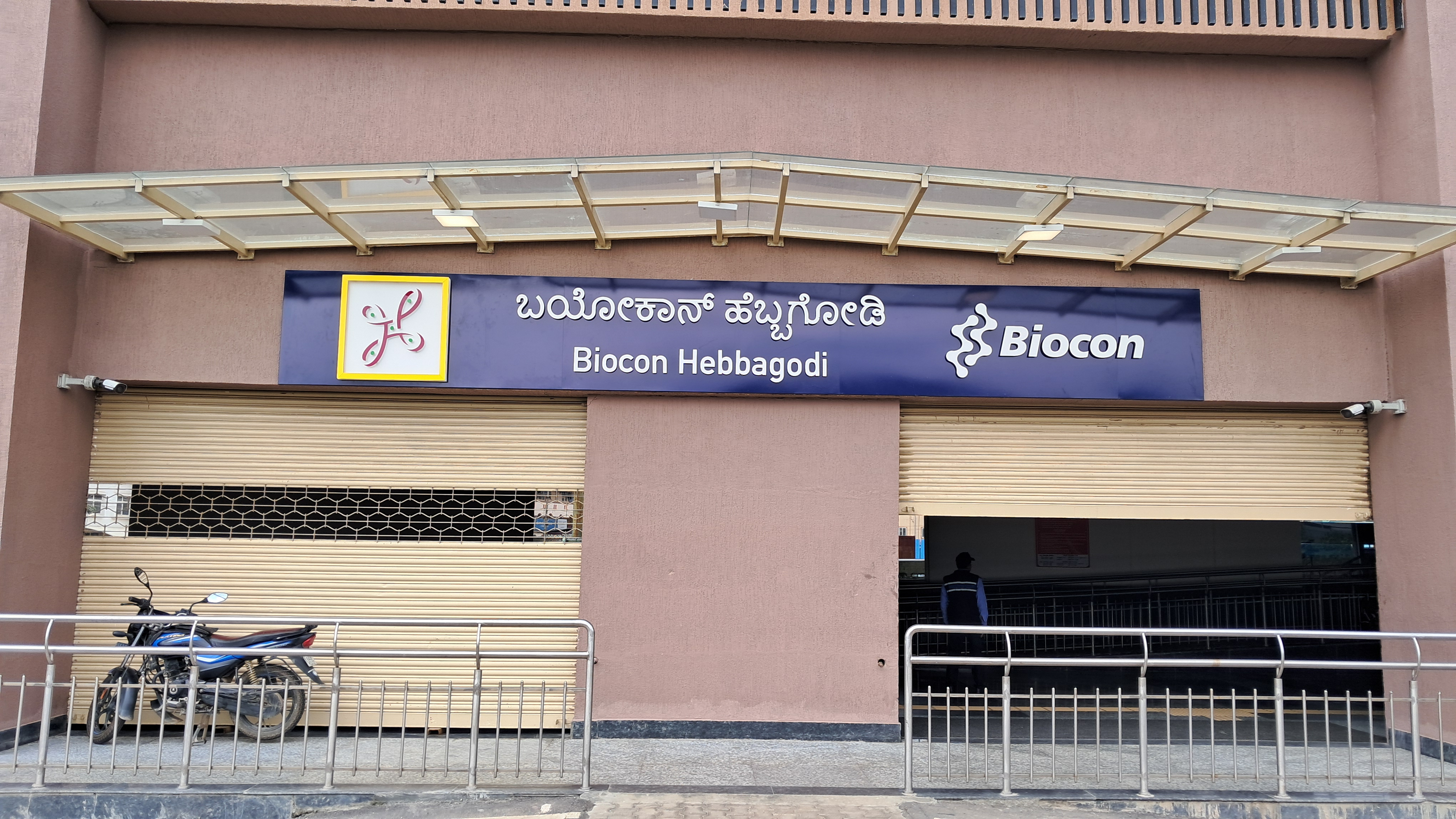
- Entrance A in July 2025

General information
- Location: Veerasandra, Hebbagodi, Bommasandra, Karnataka 560099
- Coordinates: 12.82909°N 77.68133°E
- System: Namma Metro station
- Owner: Namma Metro
- Operator: Bangalore Metro Rail Corporation Ltd (BMRCL)
- Line: Yellow Line
- Platforms: 2 (2 side platforms)
- Tracks: 2

Construction
- Structure type: Elevated
- Platform levels: 2
- Parking: Two wheeler parking pnly
- Accessible: Yes
- Architect: ITD - ITD Cementation India JV

Other information
- Status: Operational and staffed
- Station code: HBGI

History
- Opened: 10 August 2025; 13 months ago
- Former names: Hebbagodi

Services
| Preceding station | Namma Metro | Following station |
|---|---|---|
| Huskur Road towards Rashtreeya Vidyalaya Road | Yellow Line | Delta Electronics Bommasandra Terminus |
Route map
Location

Biocon Hebbagodi (formerly called as Hebbagodi) is an elevated metro station on the Yellow Line of the Namma Metro serving the Hebbagodi suburban area of Bengaluru.

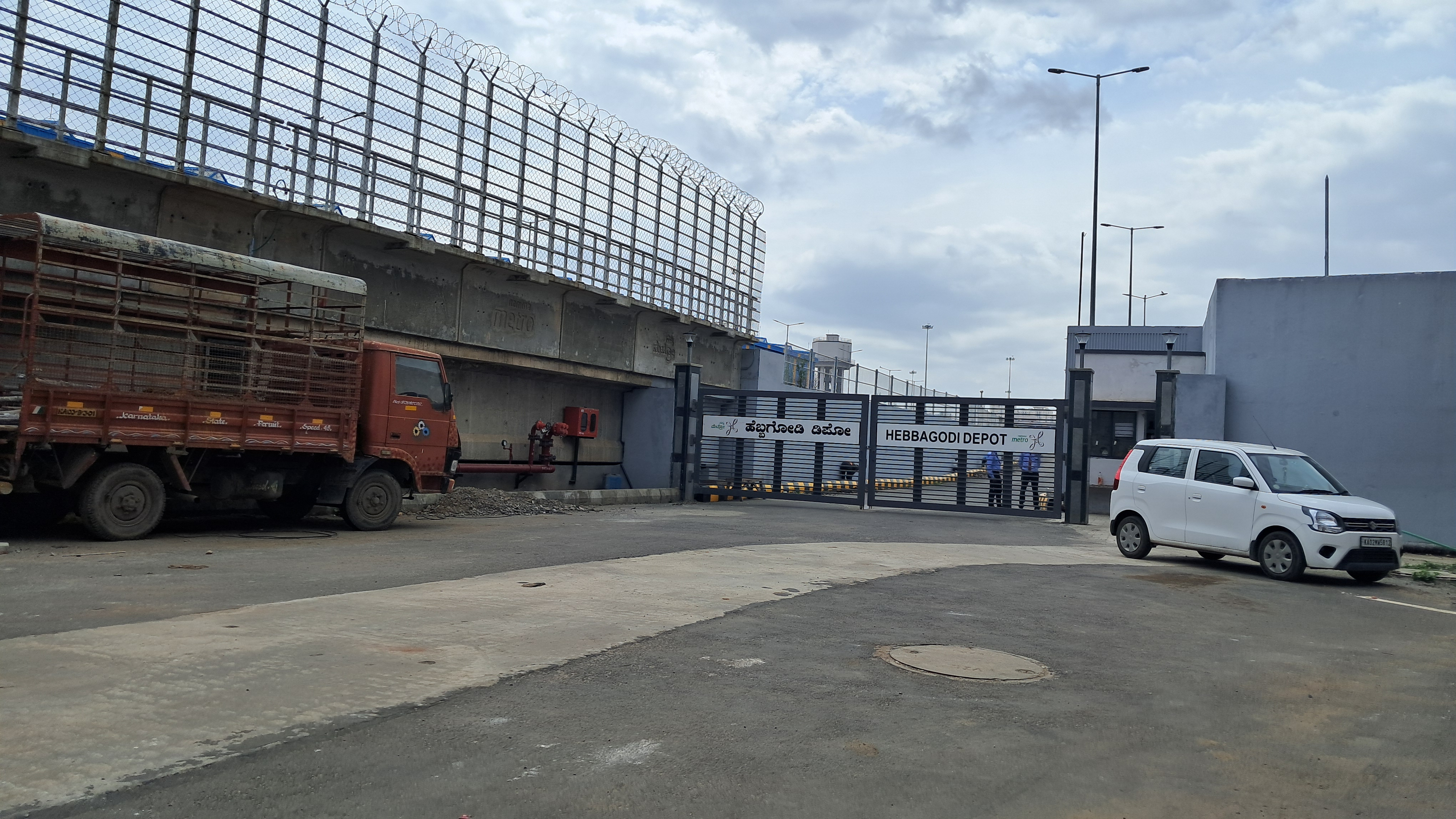
The main Hebbagodi depot for the maintenance of all Yellow Line trainsets

Adjoining the station is the depot for the maintenance of all Yellow Line trainsets.

== History ==
In December 2016, the Bangalore Metro Rail Corporation Limited (BMRCL) issued a call for bids to construct the Hebbagodi metro station along the 6.418 km Reach 5 – Package 1 section (Bommasandra - Hosa Road) of the 18.825 km Yellow Line of Namma Metro. On 25 March 2017, ITD-ITD Cementation JV was selected as the lowest bidder for this stretch, with their bid closely aligning with the original cost estimates. Consequently, the contract was successfully awarded to the company, which then commenced construction of the metro station in accordance with the agreements. In 2020, Biocon Group signed an agreement with the BMRCL to contribute ₹65 crore towards the construction of the metro station and donated land worth ₹30 crore for the project. Consequently, Biocon obtained the naming rights for the station for 30 years, and the station was renamed from Hebbagodi to Biocon Hebbagodi.

The Yellow Line began operations from 10 August 2025 and has been officially inaugurated by Prime Minister Narendra Modi, with four trainsets which are ready for operations after arriving from Titagarh Rail Systems in Kolkata. The opening was delayed from May 2025 as previously announced by the Namma Metro managing director Maheshwar Rao.

== Station layout ==
| G | Street level | Exit/Entrance |
| L1 | Mezzanine | Fare control, station agent, Metro Card vending machines, crossover |
| L2 | Side platform | Doors will open on the left |
| L2 | Platform 2 Southbound | Towards → Delta Electronics Bommasandra |
| L2 | Platform 1 Northbound | Towards ← Rashtreeya Vidyalaya Road; Next Station: Huskur Road |
| L2 | Side platform | Doors will open on the left |

== Gallery ==
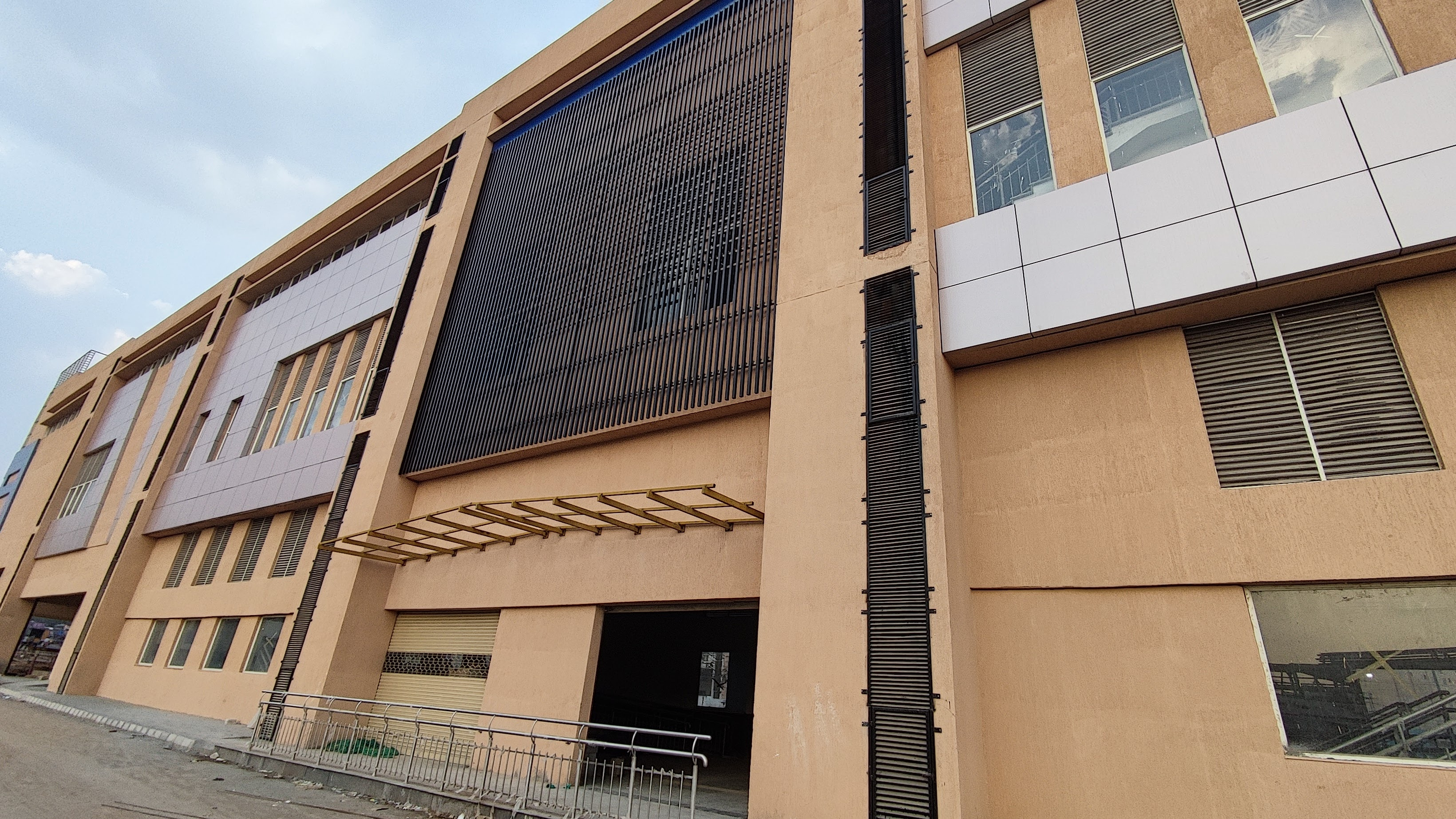
This metro station under construction in July 2023

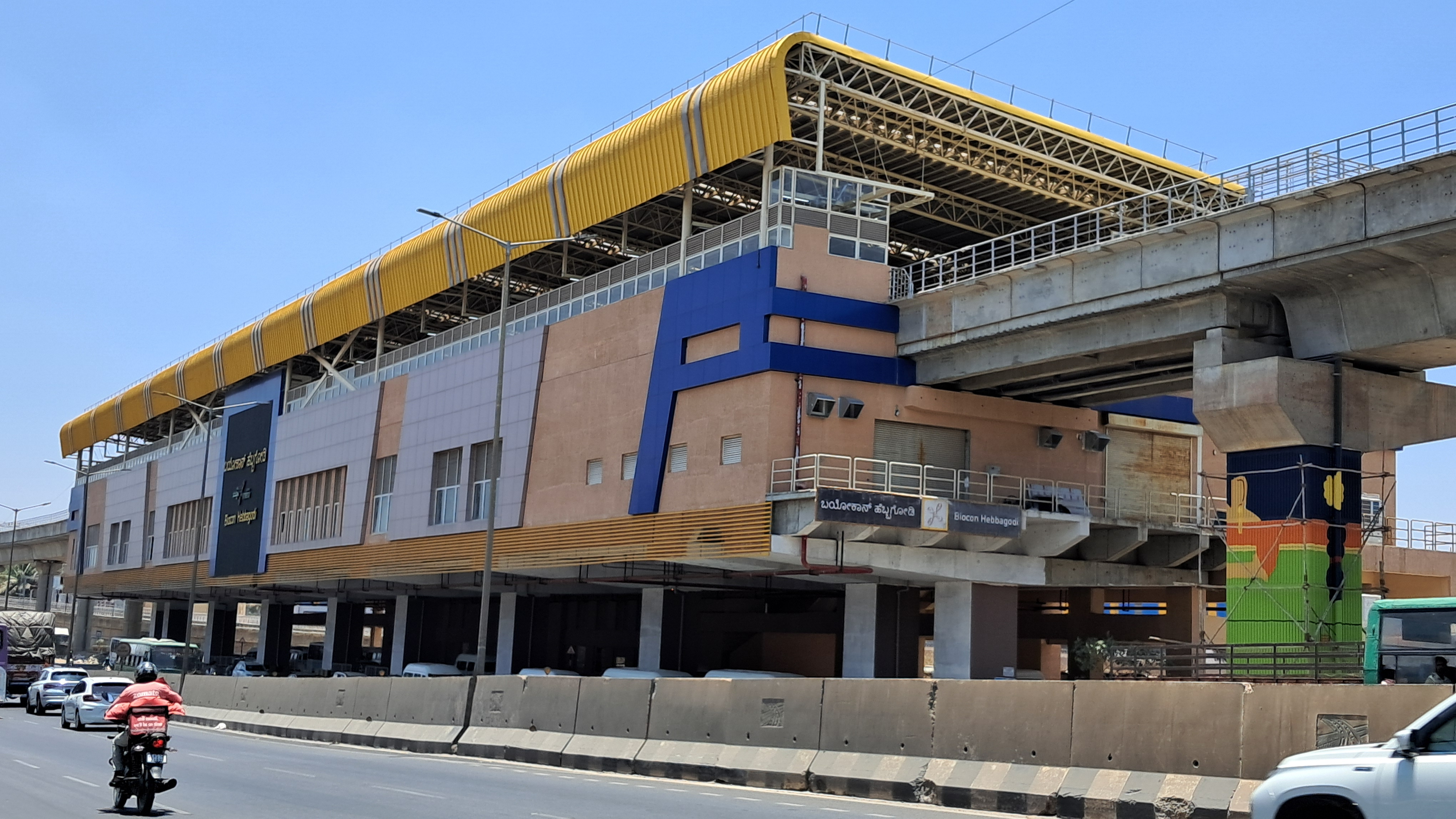
Installation of the station name board in April 2024

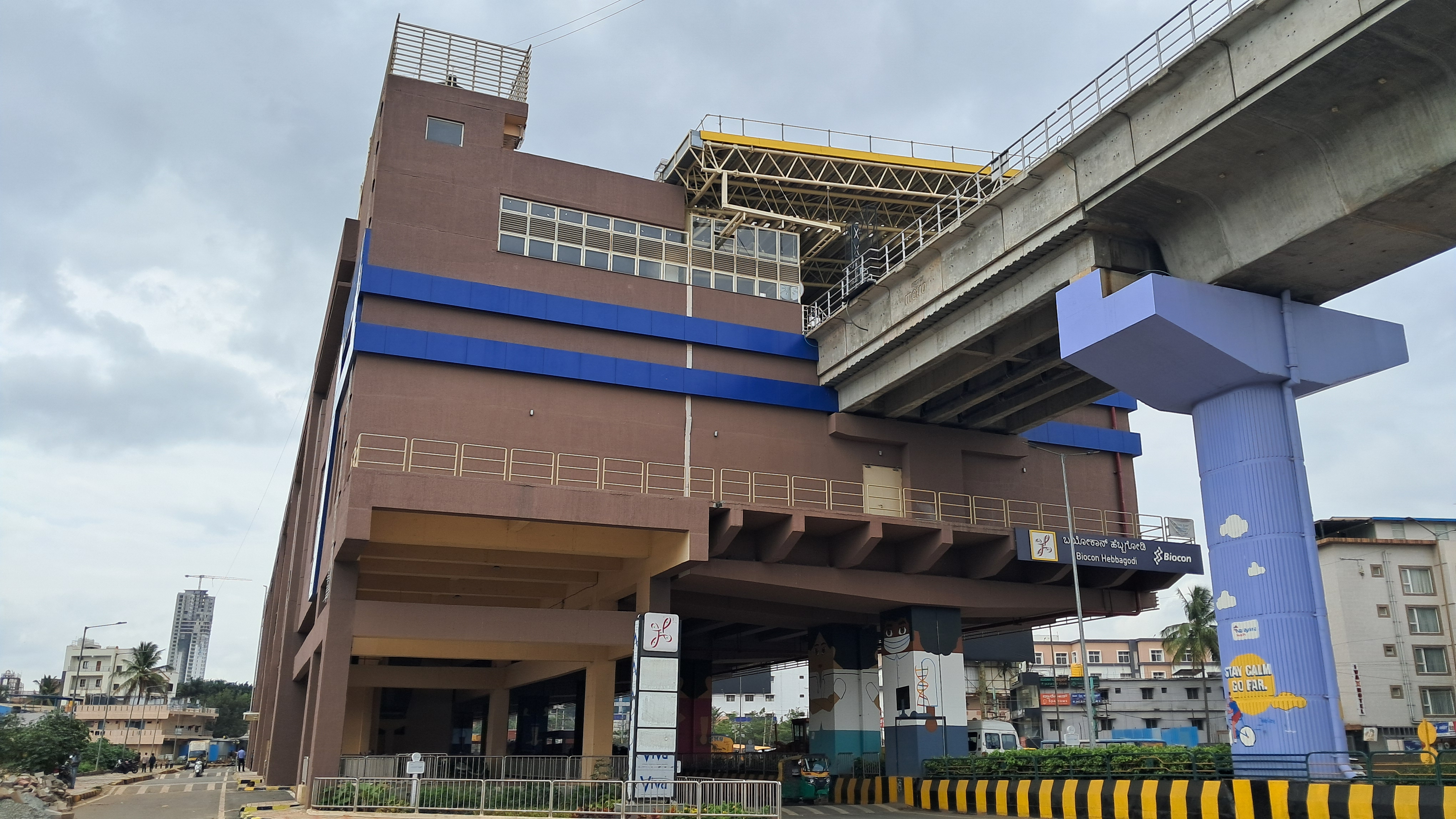
Fully constructed station in July 2025

== See also ==
- Bengaluru
- List of Namma Metro stations
- Transport in Bengaluru
