= Shree Ananthnagara =

- Locality
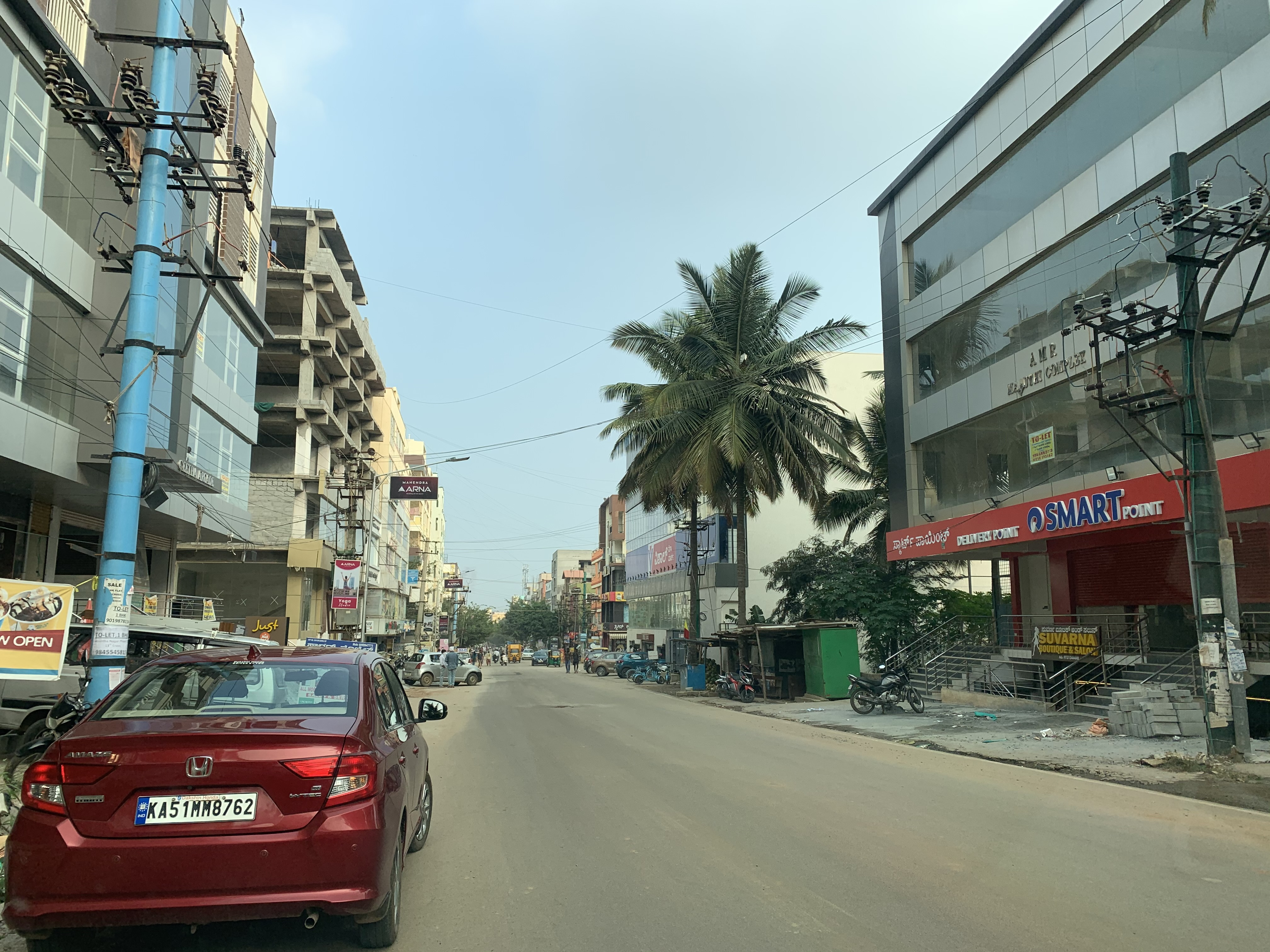
- Country: India
- State: Karnataka
- District: Bengaluru Urban
- City: Bengaluru
- Postal code: 560100

Shree Ananthnagara is a locality situated in the south of Bengaluru, tucked between Electronic City to the west and Sarjapur Road to the east. It is about 3 km (1.9 mi) from the Electronic City Phase 2, about 8 km (5.0 mi) from Sarjapur Road and about 11 km (6.8 mi) from the Central Silk Board, and occupies a space of 800 acres (320 ha).

== History ==
It was developed in 1991. It is developed into three phases:- Ananthnagar Phase 1, Phase 2 and Vasundara Layout. It lies near Fruit Market and has many IT companies in the proximity. It was developed for the community, where now it houses hundreds of families and commercial establishments. Many big apartment projects have come up here in the near past.

== Culture ==
People who reside have rented their properties to many different cultures. It has a school and a Hindu temple, Shree Ananthnagara Venkatramana Temple, developed in 1997. Religious occasions and festivals are carried out here, be it Ugadi (Kannada New Year), Tulasi Poojan Diwas, or Navratri.

== Location ==
It is near APMC Market at Singena Agrahara, and comes under Hebbagodi City Municipal Council (CMC) and is within BMRDA jurisdiction.

St. Francis de sales Group of Institutions is nearby. Narayana Health is 3 km (1.9 mi) away. Electronic City is about 3 km (1.9 mi) from Shree Ananthnagara. Shree Ananthnagara has three mains access roads, one directly from Hosur Highway, another one via APMC Fruit Market on Huskuru Road and the third one connecting from Chandapura- Dommasandra road.

The area is just 8 km (5.0 mi) from the Wipro SEZ, Sarjapura Road and one can reach Sarjapura Road and Bellanduru via Huskuru village cross-roads without using the traffic-clogged city roads.

== Facilities ==
The area has recently developed into a residential hub. Housing developments are being created as well. Various shopping facilities including supermarket chains like MORE, STAR Hypermarket, Reliance Smart Point, Vishal Hypermarket, Organic Mandya, Trendy collection, Grand Mart Hypermarket, etc. have shops and malls in the area. The renowned heart speciality hospital Narayana Health is situated about 4 km (2.5 mi) from this area. Many schools and tuition centers are within 2 km (1.2 mi) radius, like National Public School (NPS), Ebenezer International School, Brookefield High, Sri Chaitanya International School, St Francis De Sales Public School, EuroKids Pre-school, Jumbo-Kids Pre-school, Vidya Tuition Center etc. Many banks like Axis Bank, Andhra Bank, ICICI Bank & RBL and restaurant chains like Domino's, MDP Coffee, LJ Iyengar's, Sri Mamtha Grand, etc. have recently opened here. A metro rail station is being constructed within walkable distance from the area as part of Namma Metro Yellow Line.

The Heelalige Railway station of Bengaluru Commuter rail is just about 3 km from the area. A fleet of Commuter trains pass through this station which connects people to Bangalore's other tech corridor railway stations of Carmelaram (Sarjapura Road), Bellanduru Road, Baiyyappanahalli and Hebbala. This has immensely benefited the people, who commute from this area to the other parts of Bengaluru, as they can take the Commuter service and escape the city traffic.
