= Infosys Foundation Konappana Agrahara metro station =

Namma Metro's Yellow Line important metro station

Infosys Foundation Konappana Agrahara
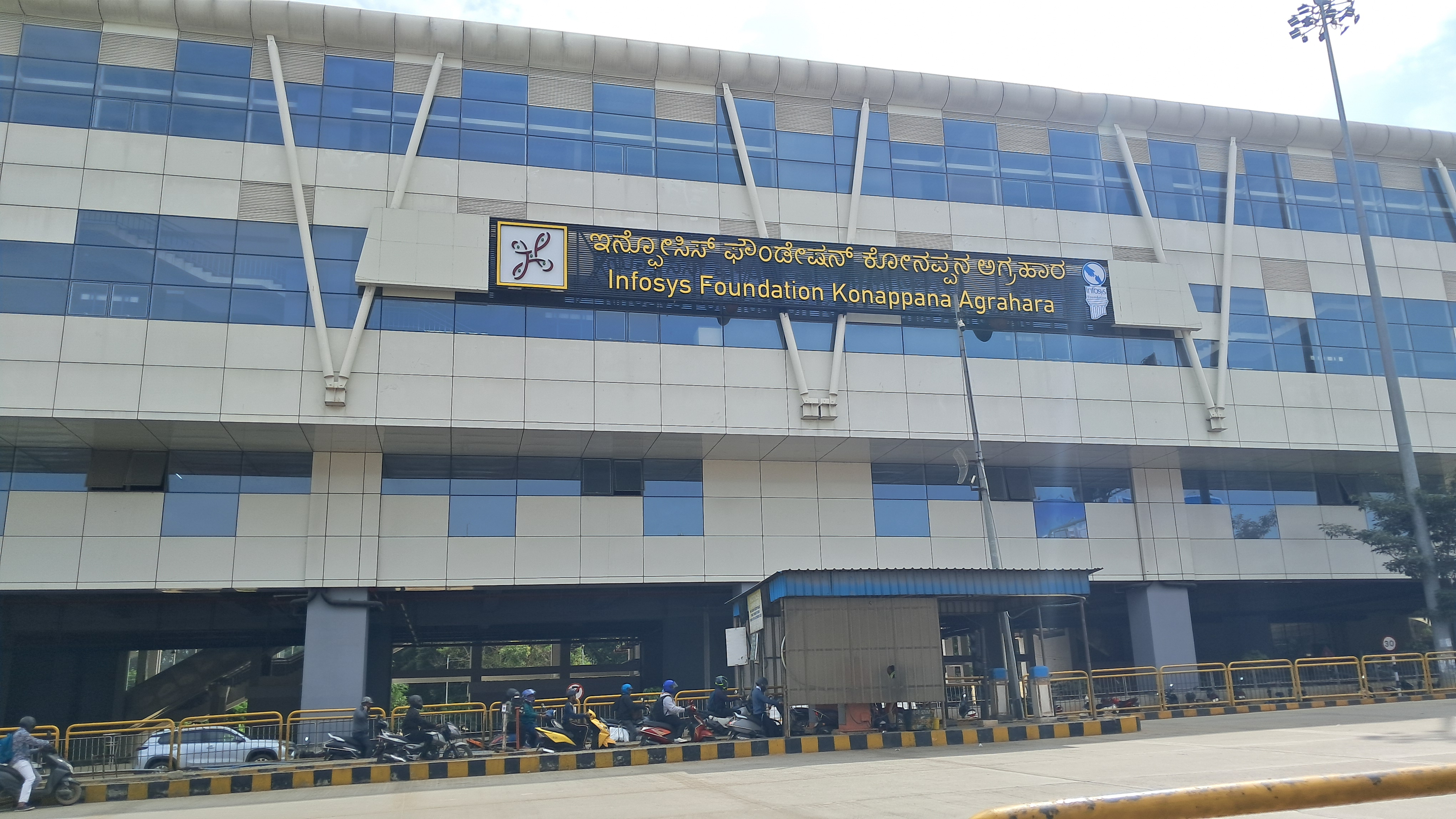
- Fully constructed metro station as of July 2025

General information
- Other names: Konappana Agrahara
- Location: Konappana Agrahara, Electronic City, Bengaluru, Karnataka 560100
- Coordinates: 12.85648°N 77.66361°E
- System: Namma Metro
- Owner: Bangalore Metro Rail Corporation Ltd (BMRCL)
- Operator: Namma Metro
- Line: Yellow Line
- Platforms: Side platform Platform-1 → Rashtreeya Vidyalaya Road; Platform-2 → Delta Electronics Bommasandra
- Tracks: 2

Construction
- Structure type: Elevated, Double track
- Platform levels: 2
- Parking: Two-Wheeler Parking only
- Accessible: Yes
- Architect: ITD - ITD Cementation India JV

Other information
- Status: Operational and Staffed
- Station code: ECTN

History
- Opened: 10 August 2025; 15 months ago
- Electrified: 750 V DC third rail

Services
| Preceding station | Namma Metro | Following station |
|---|---|---|
| Electronic City towards Rashtreeya Vidyalaya Road | Yellow Line | Huskur Road towards Delta Electronics Bommasandra |
Route map
Location

Infosys Foundation Konappana Agrahara (formerly called as Konappana Agrahara), is an elevated metro station on the north–south corridor of the Yellow Line of Namma Metro in Bengaluru, India.

== History ==
In December 2016, the Bangalore Metro Rail Corporation Limited (BMRCL) issued a call for bids to construct the Electronic City metro station along the 6.418 km Reach 5 – Package 1 section (Bommasandra - Hosa Road) of the 18.825 km Yellow Line of Namma Metro. On 25 March 2017, ITD-ITD Cementation JV was selected as the lowest bidder for this stretch, with their bid closely aligning with the original cost estimates. Consequently, the contract was successfully awarded to the company, which then commenced construction of the metro station in accordance with the agreements. Infosys Foundation contributed ₹115 crore (US$12 million) for this station, including ₹100 crore (US$11 million) for station construction and ₹15 crore (US$1.6 million) for installation of half-height platform screen doors.

The Yellow Line began operations from 10 August 2025 and has been officially inaugurated by Prime Minister Narendra Modi, with four trainsets which are ready for operations after arriving from Titagarh Rail Systems in Kolkata. The opening was delayed from May 2025 as previously announced by the Namma Metro Managing Director, Maheshwar Rao.

== Station layout ==
| G | Street level | Exit/Entrance |
| L1 | Mezzanine | Exits towards Electronic City Phase 1 and Phase 2, Footover bridge |
| L2 | Concourse | Fare control, station agent, Metro Card vending machines, crossover, Footover bridge to Infosys Campus |
| L3 | Side platform | Doors will open on the left |
| L3 | Platform 2 Southbound | Towards → Delta Electronics Bommasandra; Next Station: Huskur Road |
| L3 | Platform 1 Northbound | Towards ← Rashtreeya Vidyalaya Road; Next Station: Electronic City |
| L3 | Side platform | Doors will open on the left |
| L3 |

== Entry/Exits ==
There are three entry/exit points – A, B and C. Commuters can use either of the points for their travel.

- Entry/Exit point A: Towards Electronic City Phase-1 Side
- Entry/Exit point B: Towards Electronic City Phase-1 Side
- Entry/Exit point C: Towards Electronic City Phase-2 Side

== Gallery ==
Here are some of the metro station captures shown below:-

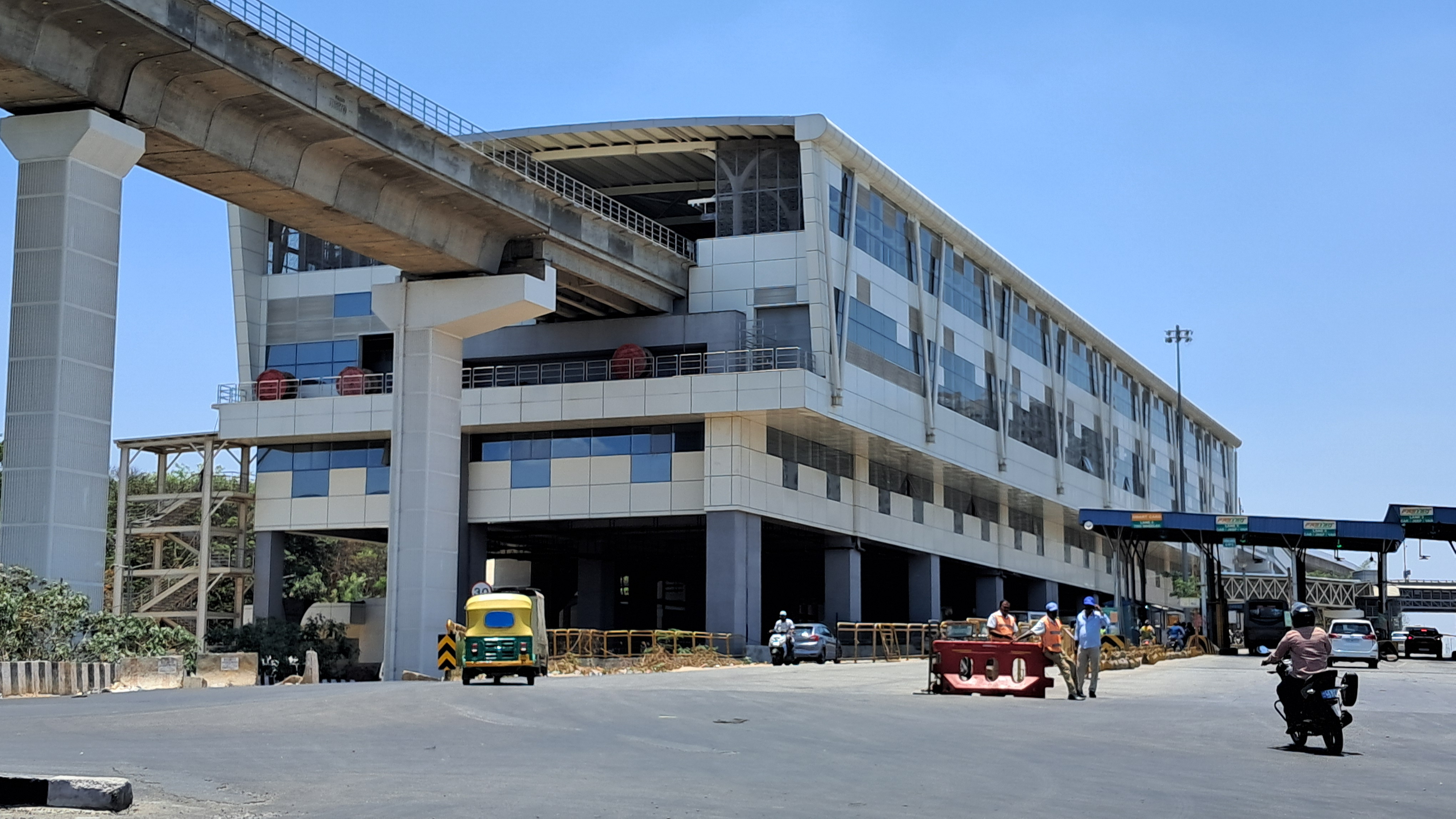
Final stages of this metro station as in April 2024

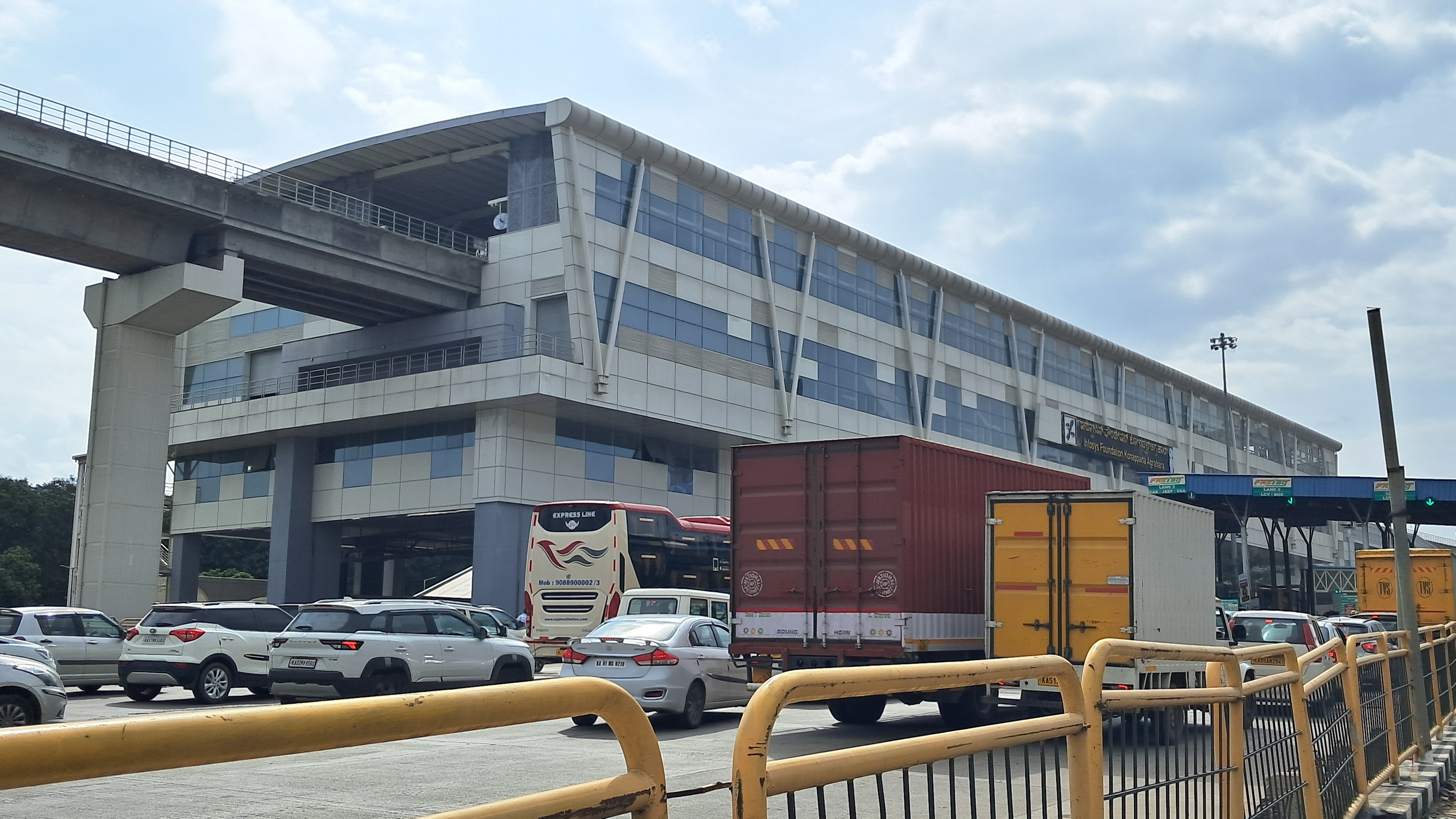
Side view of this metro station as in July 2025

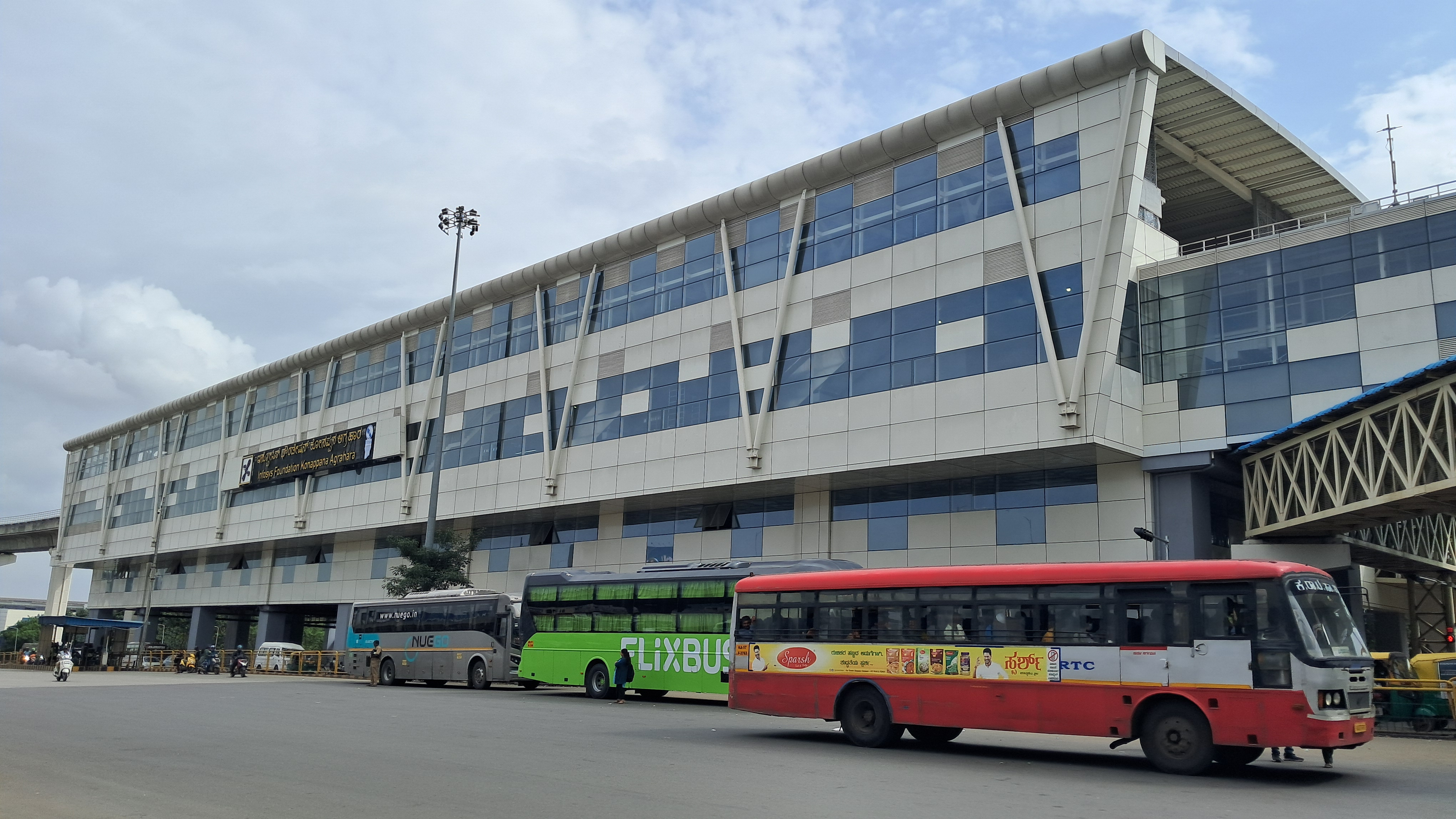
Another side view of this metro station as in July 2025

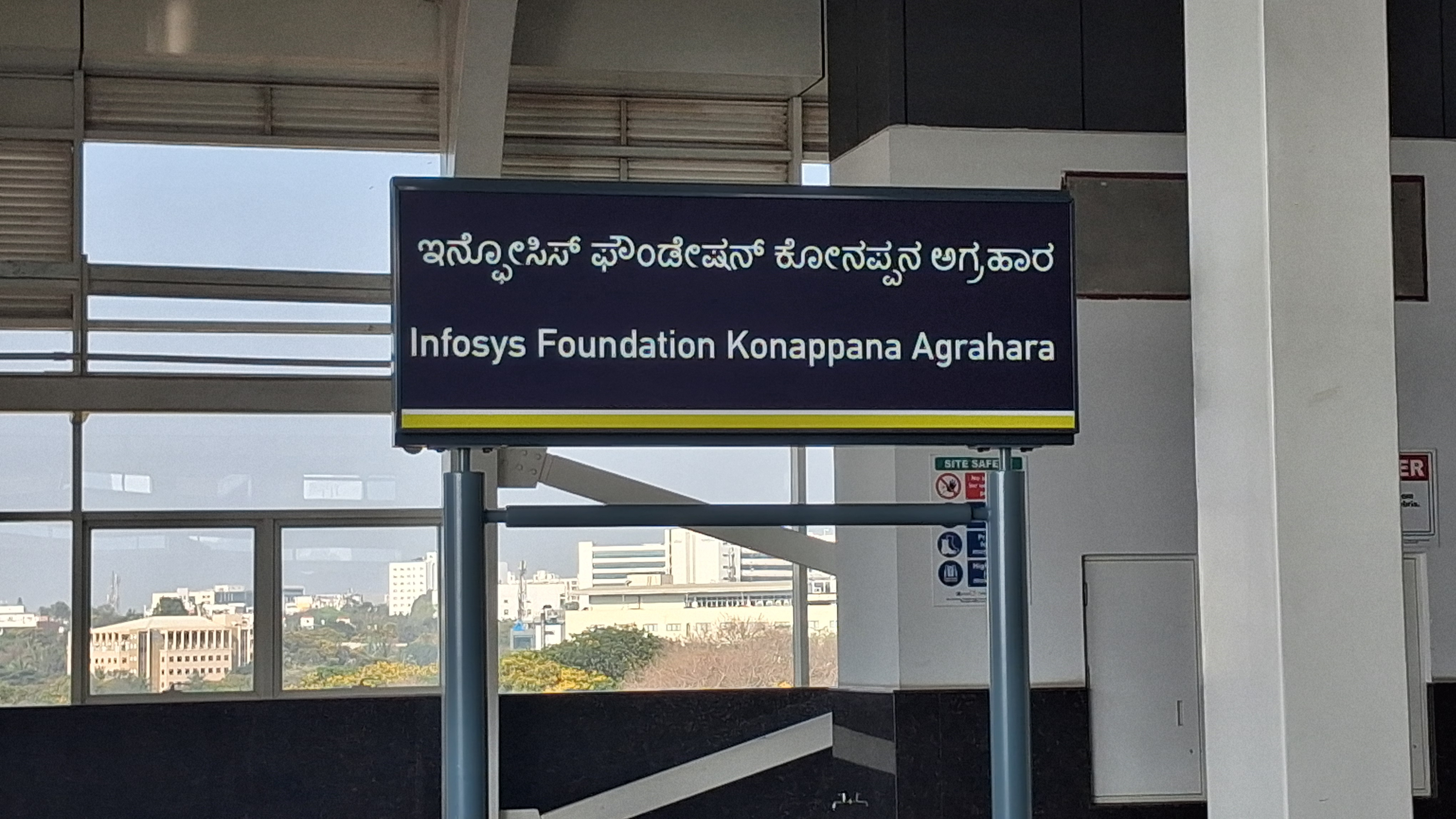
Station Board of this metro station as of April 2026

== See also ==
- Bengaluru
- List of Namma Metro stations
- Transport in Karnataka
- List of metro systems
- List of rapid transit systems in India
