= Huskur Road metro station =

Namma Metro's Yellow Line metro station

Huskur Road
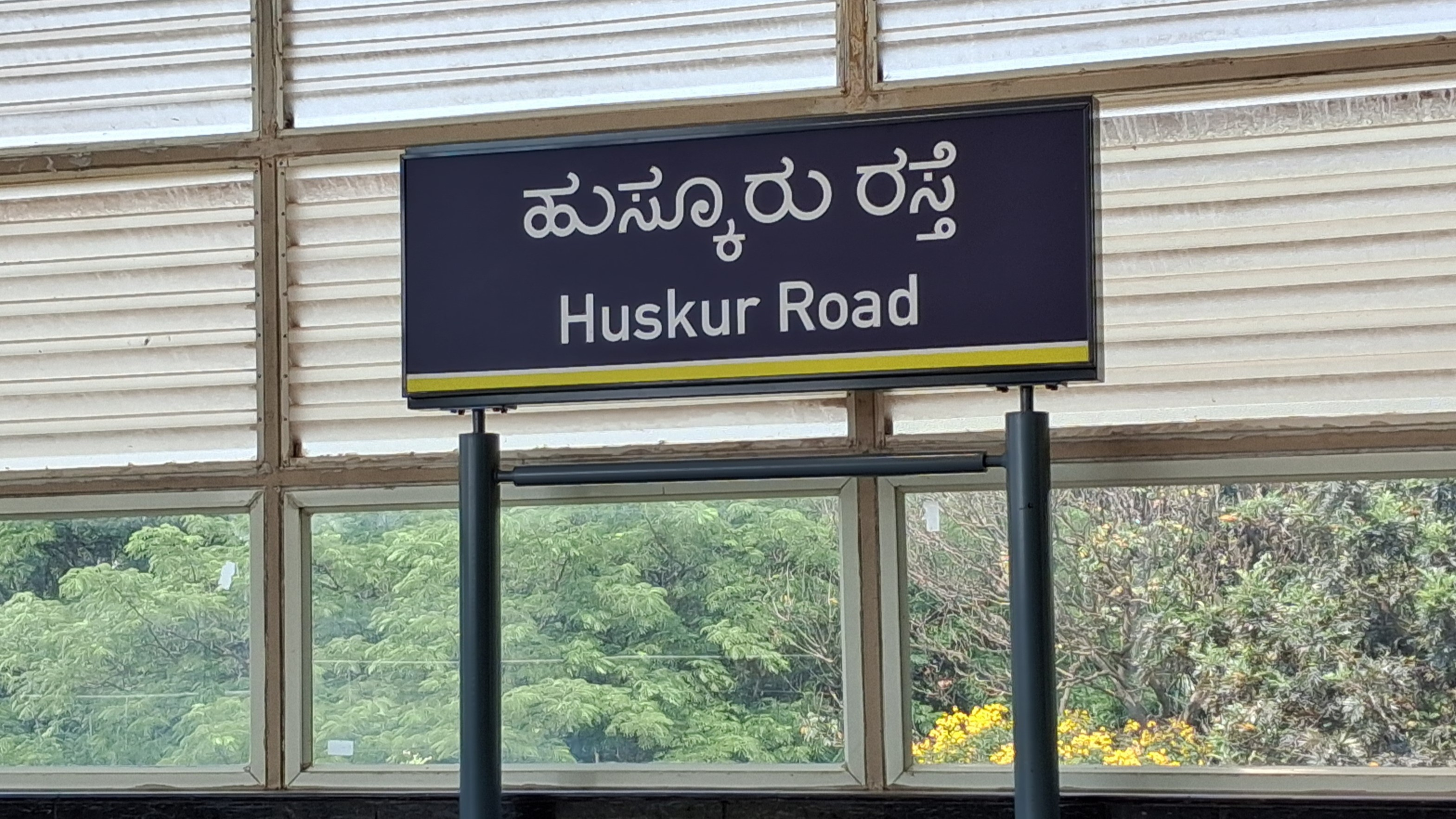
- Station Board of this metro station as of April 2026

General information
- Other names: Veerasandra
- Location: Veerasandra, Electronic City, Bengaluru, Karnataka 560100
- Coordinates: 12.83901°N 77.67754°E
- System: Namma Metro station
- Owner: Bangalore Metro Rail Corporation Ltd (BMRCL)
- Operator: Namma Metro
- Line: Yellow Line
- Platforms: Side platform Platform-1 → Rashtreeya Vidyalaya Road; Platform-2 → Delta Electronics Bommasandra
- Tracks: 2

Construction
- Structure type: Elevated, Double track
- Platform levels: 2
- Parking: Two-Wheeler Parking Only
- Accessible: Yes
- Architect: ITD - ITD Cementation India JV

Other information
- Status: Operational and Staffed
- Station code: HSKR

History
- Opened: 10 August 2025; 12 months ago
- Electrified: 750 V DC third rail

Services
Preceding station	Namma Metro	Following station
Infosys Foundation Konappana Agrahara towards Rashtreeya Vidyalaya Road	Yellow Line	Biocon Hebbagodi towards Delta Electronics Bommasandra
Route map
Location

Huskur Road (also known as Veerasandra) is an elevated metro station on the North-South corridor of the Yellow Line of Namma Metro in Bengaluru, India.

== History ==
In December 2016, the Bangalore Metro Rail Corporation Limited (BMRCL) issued a call for bids to construct the Huskur Road metro station along the 6.418 km Reach 5 – Package 1 section (Bommasandra - Hosa Road) of the 18.825 km Yellow Line of Namma Metro. On 25 March 2017, ITD-ITD Cementation JV was selected as the lowest bidder for this stretch, with their bid closely aligning with the original cost estimates. Consequently, the contract was successfully awarded to the company, which then commenced construction of the metro station in accordance with the agreements.

The Yellow Line began operations from 10 August 2025 and has been officially inaugurated by Prime Minister Narendra Modi, with four trainsets which are ready for operations after arriving from Titagarh Rail Systems in Kolkata. The opening was delayed from May 2025 as previously announced by the Namma Metro Managing Director, Maheshwar Rao.

== Station layout ==
G	Street level	Exit/Entrance
L1	Mezzanine	Fare control, station agent, Metro Card vending machines, crossover
L2	Side platform | Doors will open on the left
L2	Platform 2 Southbound	Towards → Delta Electronics Bommasandra; Next Station: Biocon Hebbagodi
L2	Platform 1 Northbound	Towards ← Rashtreeya Vidyalaya Road; Next Station: Infosys Foundation Konappana Agrahara
L2	Side platform | Doors will open on the left
L2

== Gallery ==
Here are some of the metro station captures shown below:-

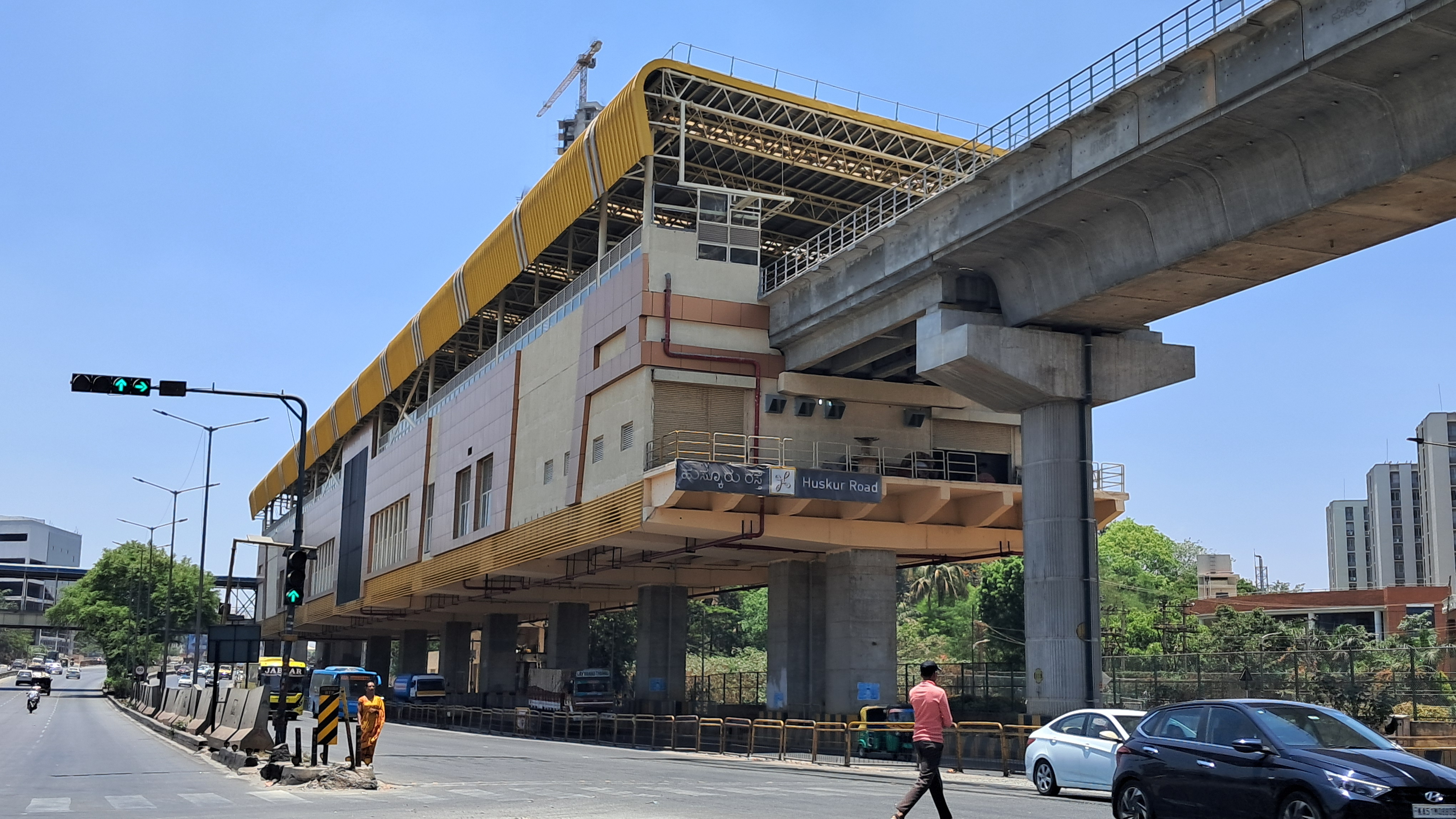
Road-side view of this metro station as of April 2024

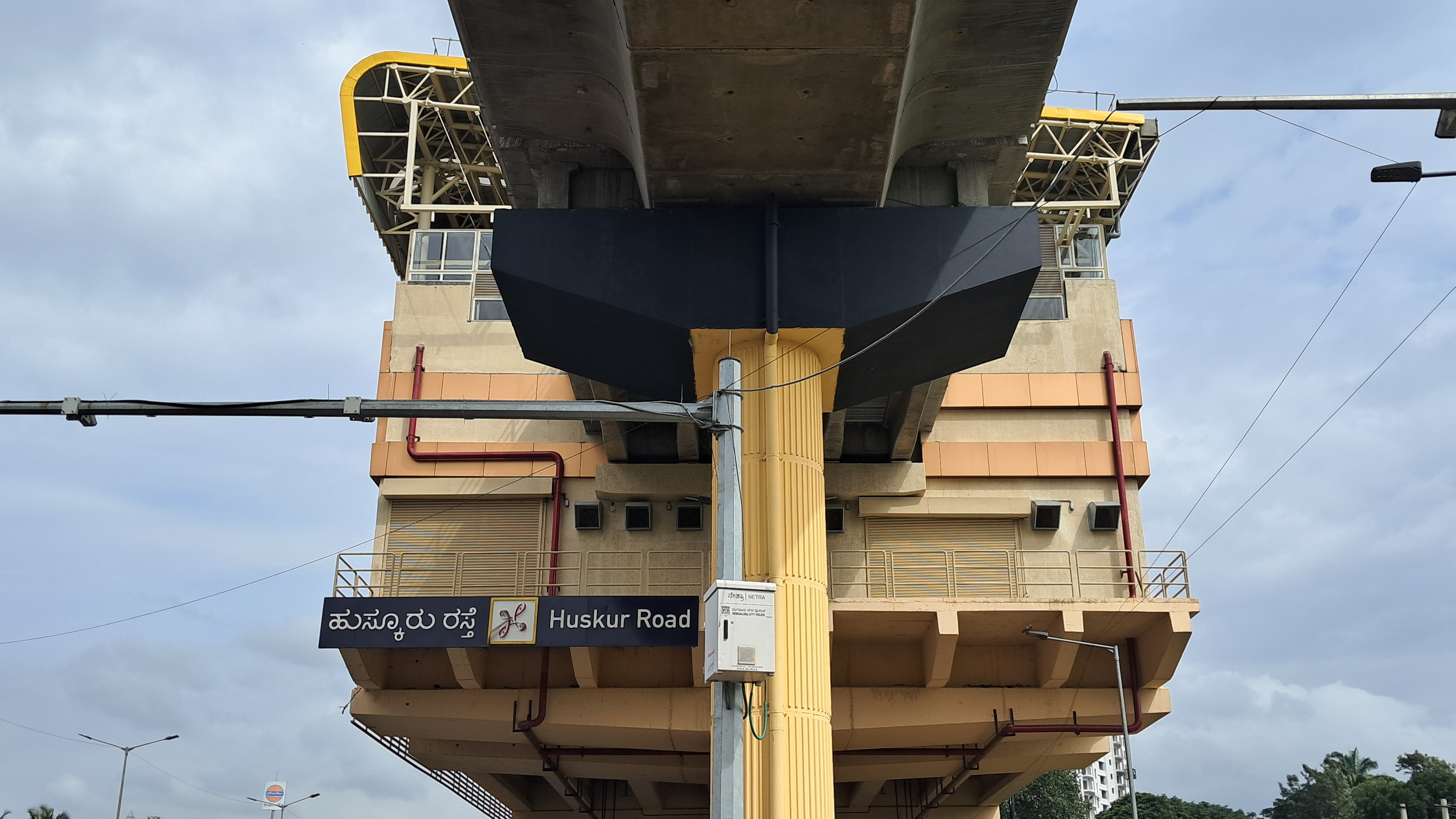
Front view of this metro station as of July 2025

== See also ==
- Bengaluru
- List of Namma Metro stations
- Transport in Karnataka
- List of metro systems
- List of rapid transit systems in India
