= Hebbagodi =

- Suburb City
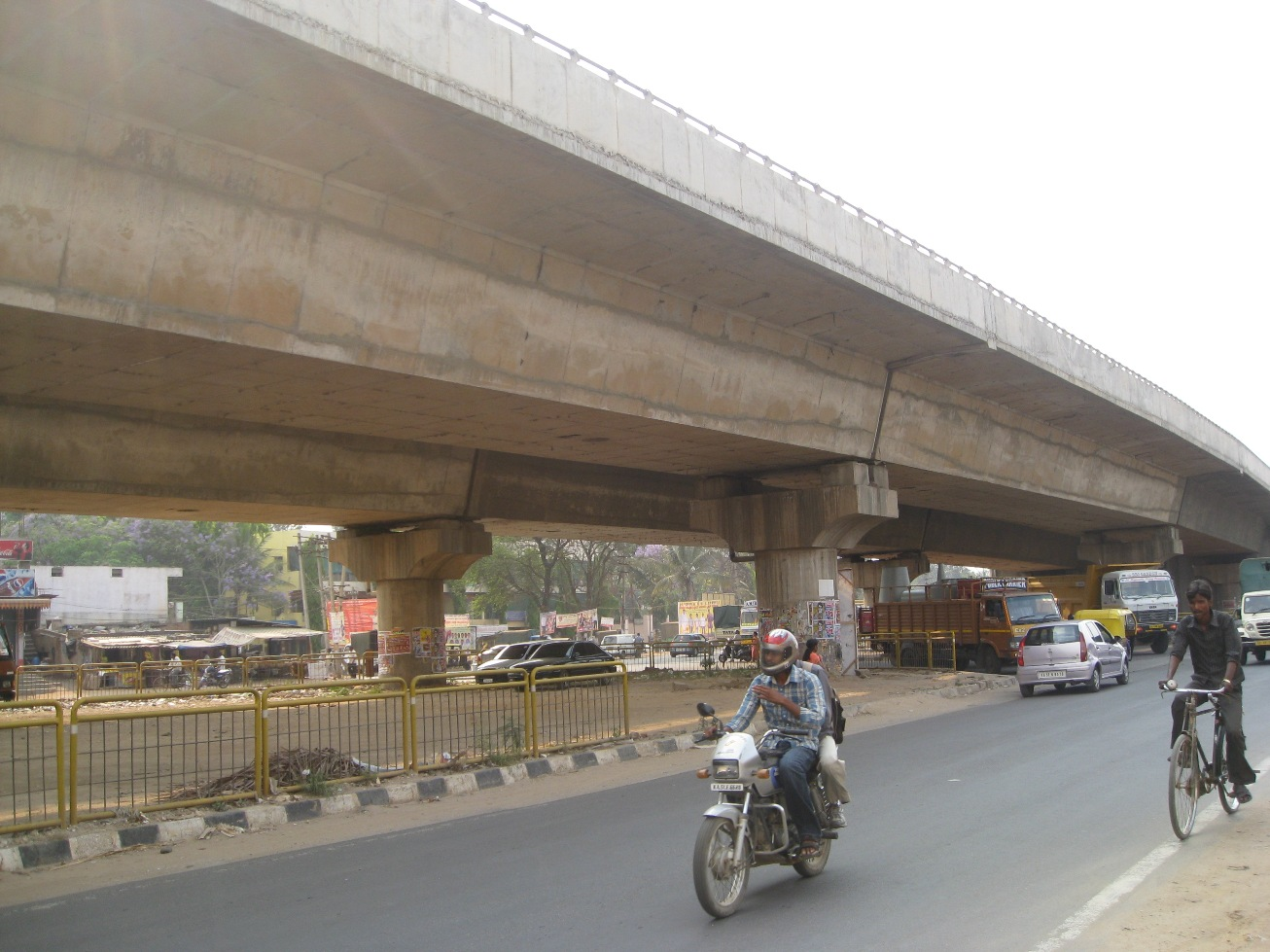
- Hebbagodi-Bommasandra flyover on Hosur Road.

- Location within Karnataka Location within India
- Coordinates: 12.82°N 77.68°E
- Country: India
- State: Karnataka
- District: Bengaluru Urban

Government
  - Type: City Municipal Council
  - Body: Hebbagodi City Municipal Council

Population (2011)
  - Total: 34,827

Languages
  - Official: Kannada
- Time zone: UTC+5:30 (IST)
- PIN: 560099, 560100
- Telephone code: 91-80
- Vehicle registration: KA 51, KA 59
- Website: https://www.hebbagodicity.mrc.gov.in

Hebbagodi is a suburb city outside of Bengaluru in the Indian state of Karnataka. It is managed by Hebbagodi City Municipal Council. It comes under the Bengaluru Metropolitan Region.

== Demographics ==
As of the 2011 India census, the population of Hebbagodi was 34,827. Male population constituted to 59.6% (20,771) of the total population and female population constituted to 40.4% (14,056). The population of children in the age group 0–6 years was 3850, which was 11.05% of the total population. The gender ratio was 677:1000 i.e. 677 females for every 1000 men, against the state average of 973. Moreover, the child ratio in Hebbagodi was around 1022 compared to the Karnataka state average of 948. The literacy rate of Hebbagodi was 91.22%, higher than the state average of 75.36%. In Hebbagodi, male literacy was around 94.46%.
