= Chikkajala metro station =

Future Namma Metro station under Blue Line

Chikkajala
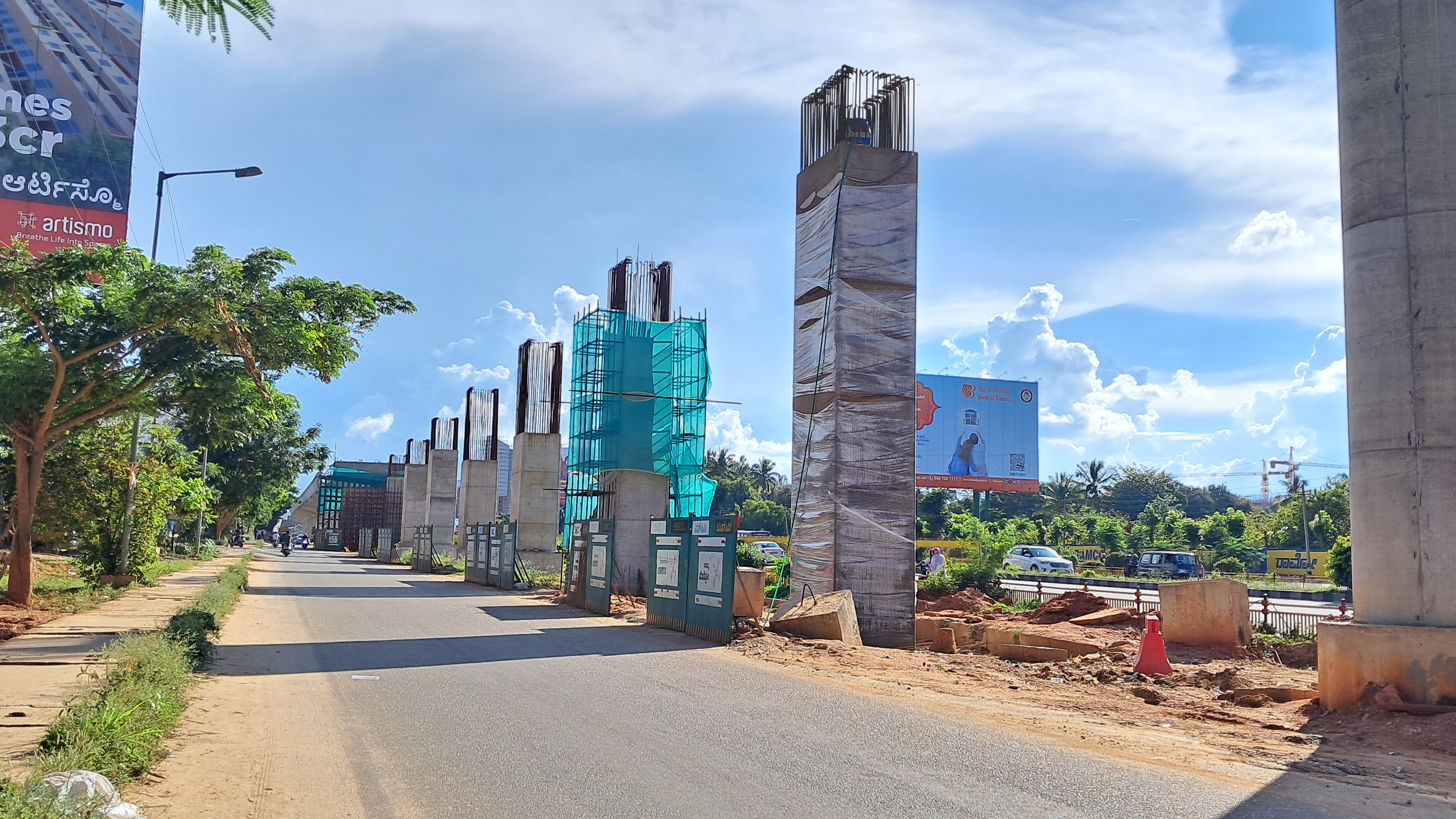
- Under construction of this metro station as of October 2024 under Phase 2B of Blue Line of Namma Metro

General information
- Location: Survey No 70/10, A2, Bellary Rd, Chikkajala, Bengaluru, Karnataka 562157
- Coordinates: 13.16929°N 77.63179°E
- System: Namma Metro station
- Owner: Bangalore Metro Rail Corporation Ltd (BMRCL)
- Operator: Namma Metro
- Line: Blue Line
- Platforms: Side platform (TBC); Platform-1 → Krishnarajapura / Central Silk Board; Platform-2 → KIAL Terminals; Platform Numbers (TBC)
- Tracks: 2 (TBC)

Construction
- Structure type: Elevated, Double track
- Platform levels: 2 (TBC)
- Parking: (TBC)
- Accessible: (TBC)

Other information
- Status: Currently axed from Blue Line & converted to Future Station
- Station code: (TBC)

History
- Opening: (TBC)
- Electrified: (TBC)

Services
Preceding station	Namma Metro	Following station
Bagalur Cross towards Krishnarajapura or Central Silk Board	Blue Line (Future Service and skipping Bettahalasuru)	Doddajala towards KIAL Terminals
Route map
Location

Chikkajala is a cancelled elevated metro station on the north–south corridor of the Blue Line of Namma Metro in Bangalore, India. This metro station will consist of the main Chikkajala village which holds the main Chikkajala Fort Ruins followed by prime locations like Decathlon Anubhava Sports Arena, Chikkajala Police Station and Chikkajala Lake. This metro station will not be operational in June 2026 due to lack of funds.

== Station layout ==
Station Layout - To Be Confirmed

G	Street level	Exit/Entrance
L1	Mezzanine	Fare control, station agent, Metro Card vending machines, crossover
L2	Side platform | Doors will open on the left
L2	Platform # Northbound	Towards → KIAL Terminals; Next Station: Doddajala
L2	Platform # Southbound	Towards ← Krishnarajapura / Central Silk Board; Next Station: Bagalur Cross (Skipping Bettahalasuru)
L2	Side platform | Doors will open on the left
L2

== See also ==
- Bangalore
- List of Namma Metro stations
- Transport in Karnataka
- List of metro systems
- List of rapid transit systems in India
- Bangalore Metropolitan Transport Corporation
