= ISRO metro station =

Upcoming Namma Metro station under Blue Line

ISRO
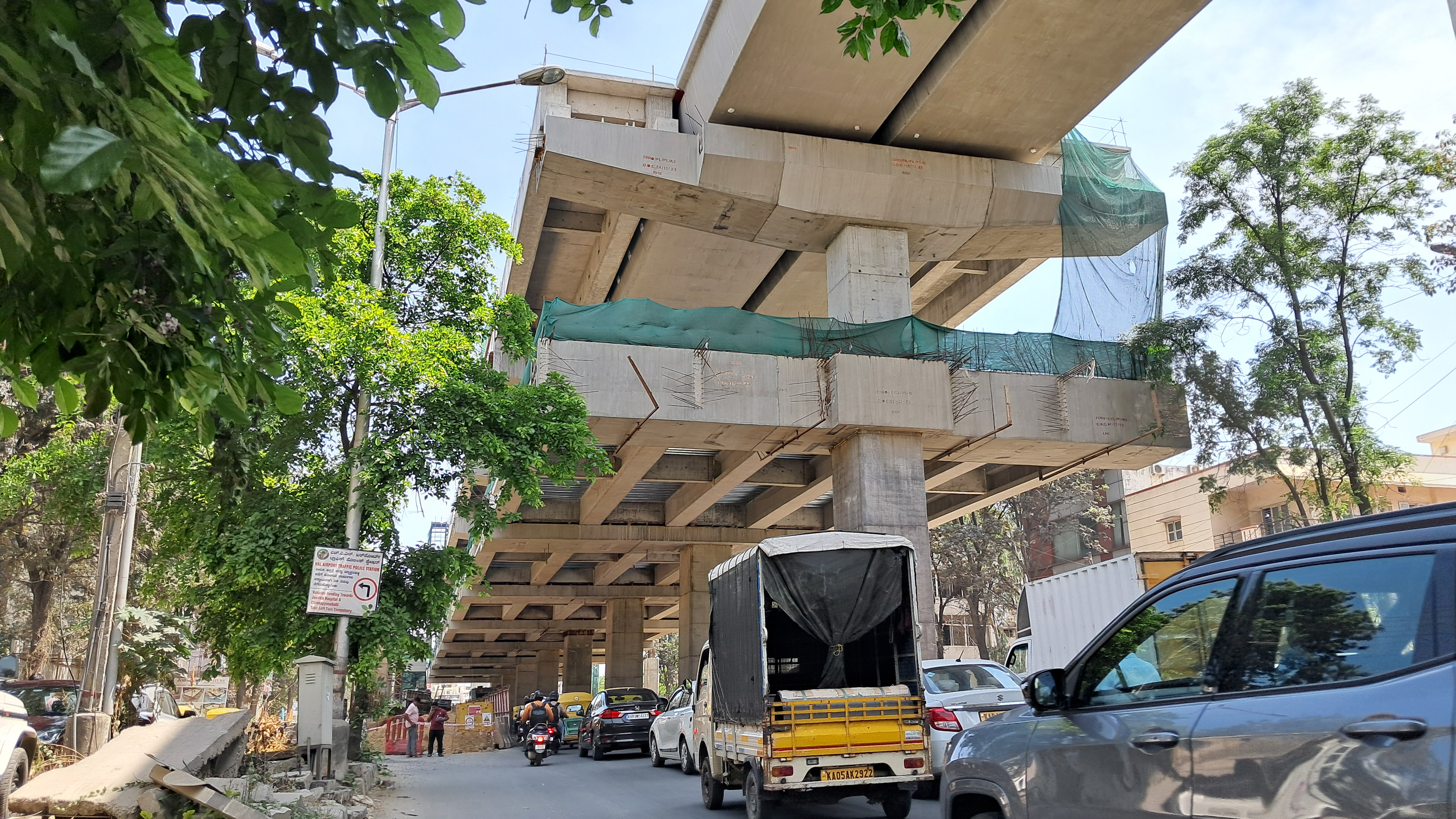
- Under Construction of this metro station as of March 2025 under Phase 2A of Blue Line of Namma Metro

General information
- Location: LRDE Layout, Doddanekundi Bengaluru, Karnataka 560037
- Coordinates: 12.96900°N 77.70115°E
- System: Namma Metro station
- Owner: Bangalore Metro Rail Corporation Ltd (BMRCL)
- Operator: Namma Metro
- Line: Blue Line
- Platforms: Side platform (TBC); Platform-1 → Central Silk Board; Platform-2 → Krishnarajapura / KIAL Terminals; Platform Numbers (TBC)
- Tracks: 2 (TBC)
- Connections: Karthik Nagar Bus Stop

Construction
- Structure type: Elevated, Double track
- Platform levels: 2 (TBC)
- Parking: (TBC)
- Accessible: (TBC)

Other information
- Status: Under Construction
- Station code: ISRO (TBC)

History
- Opening: December 2026; 3 months' time (TBC)
- Electrified: (TBC)

Services
Preceding station	Namma Metro	Following station
Marathahalli towards Central Silk Board	Blue Line (Future Service)	Doddanekundi towards Krishnarajapura or KIAL Terminals
Route map
Location

ISRO is an upcoming elevated metro station on the North-South corridor of the Blue Line of Namma Metro in Bangalore, India. This metro serves mainly the Doddanekundi area, which comprises the ISRO Assembly Integration & Testing Centre in South Bengaluru and the Outer Ring Road, which leads towards Krishnarajapura in the north and Bellandur in the south. This metro station is slated to become operational December 2026 instead of June 2026.

== History ==
In December 2019, the Bangalore Metro Rail Corporation Limited (BMRCL) invited bids for the construction of the ISRO metro station, part of the 8.377 km Reach 2A – Package 2 (Kodibeesanahalli - Krishnarajapura) of the 18.236 km Blue Line of Namma Metro. On 13 October 2020, Shankaranarayana Constructions (SNC) was chosen as the lowest bidder for this segment, with their proposal closely matching the initial cost estimates. As a result, the contract was awarded to the company, which led to the beginning of the construction works of this metro station as per the agreed terms.

== Station layout ==
Station Layout - To Be Confirmed

G	Street level	Exit/Entrance
L1	Mezzanine	Fare control, station agent, Metro Card vending machines, crossover
L2	Side platform | Doors will open on the left
L2	Platform # Southbound	Towards → Central Silk Board; Next Station: Marathahalli
L2	Platform # Northbound	Towards ← Krishnarajapura**; Next Station: Doddanekundi
L2	Side platform | Doors will open on the left
L2	Note:	** To be further extended to KIAL Terminals in future

== See also ==
- Bangalore
- List of Namma Metro stations
- Transport in Karnataka
- List of metro systems
- List of rapid transit systems in India
- Bangalore Metropolitan Transport Corporation
