= HBR Layout metro station =

Upcoming Namma Metro station under Blue Line

HBR Layout
- Under Construction of this metro station under Phase 2B of Namma Metro's Blue Line as of October 2026

General information
- Location: 4th Main Rd, 5th Block, 1st Stage, EXTENSION, HBR Layout, Bengaluru, Karnataka 560043
- Coordinates: 13.0328°N 77.6297°E
- System: Namma Metro station
- Owner: Bangalore Metro Rail Corporation Ltd (BMRCL)
- Operator: Namma Metro
- Line: Blue Line
- Platforms: Side platform (TBC); Platform-1 → Krishnarajapura / Central Silk Board; Platform-2 → KIAL Terminals; Platform numbers (TBC)
- Tracks: 2 (TBC)

Construction
- Structure type: Elevated, Double track
- Platform levels: 2 (TBC)
- Parking: (TBC)
- Accessible: (TBC)
- Architect: Nagarjuna Construction Company (NCC)

Other information
- Status: Under Construction - U-Girder Installation
- Station code: (TBC)

History
- Opening: December 2027; 13 months' time (TBC)
- Electrified: (TBC)

Services
Preceding station	Namma Metro	Following station
Kalyan Nagar towards Krishnarajapura or Central Silk Board	Blue Line (Under Construction)	Nagawara towards KIAL Terminals
Route map
Location

HBR Layout is an upcoming elevated metro station on the north–south corridor of the Blue Line of Namma Metro in Bangalore, India. Around this metro station holds the Hennur area, Residential areas of HBR Layout. This metro station is stated to become operational around December 2026.

== History ==
On November 17 2020, the Bangalore Metro Rail Corporation Limited (BMRCL) invited bids for the construction of the HBR Layout metro station, part of the 11 km Reach 2B – Package 1 (Krishnarajapura - Kempapura) of the 37.692 km Blue Line of Namma Metro. On September 14 2021, Nagarjuna Construction Company Ltd. (NCC Ltd.) was chosen as the lowest bidder for this segment, with their proposal closely matching the initial cost estimates. As a result, the contract was awarded to the company, which led to the beginning of the construction works of this metro station as per the agreed terms.

== Station layout ==
Blue Line Station Layout - To Be Confirmed

G	Street level	Exit/Entrance
L1	Mezzanine	Fare control, station agent, Metro Card vending machines, crossover
L2	Side platform | Doors will open on the left
L2	Platform # Eastbound	Towards → Krishnarajapura / Central Silk Board; Next Station: Kalyan Nagar
L2	Platform # Westbound	Towards ← Hebbala / KIAL Terminals; Next Station: Nagawara; Change at the next station for Pink Line
L2	Side platform | Doors will open on the left
L2
