= Airport City metro station =

Upcoming Namma Metro station under Blue Line

Airport City
- Under construction of this metro station as on October 2026 under Phase 2B of Blue Line of Namma Metro

General information
- Other names: KIA West Station
- Location: Kempegowda Int'l Airport Rd, Vidya Nagar, Bengaluru, Karnataka 562157
- Coordinates: 13.19833°N 77.68717°E
- System: Namma Metro station
- Owner: Bangalore Metro Rail Corporation Ltd (BMRCL)
- Operator: Namma Metro
- Line: Blue Line
- Platforms: Side platform (TBC); Platform-1 → Hebbala * Platform-2 → KIAL Terminals; Platform Numbers (TBC) * (Further extension to Krishnarajapura / Central Silk Board in the future)
- Tracks: 2 (TBC)
- Connections: KIAL Halt Railway Station

Construction
- Structure type: At-Grade, Double track
- Platform levels: 2 (TBC)
- Parking: (TBC)
- Accessible: (TBC)

Other information
- Status: Under Construction - Entry/Exit Installation on North-South sides
- Station code: (TBC)

History
- Opening: June 2027; 7 months' time (TBC)
- Electrified: (TBC)

Services
Preceding station	Namma Metro	Following station
Doddajala towards Hebbala	Blue Line (Operational around June 2027)	KIAL Terminals Terminus
Doddajala towards Krishnarajapura or Central Silk Board	Blue Line (Operational around December 2027)	KIAL Terminals Terminus
Preceding station	Indian Railways	Following station
Yelahanka Junction towards Yelahanka Junction, Yesvantpur Junction or Bengaluru City	South Western Railway zone (Transfer via Inter-Shuttle Bus towards KIAL Halt Railway Stn.)	Kolar towards Kolar or Bangarapet Junction
Route map
Location

Airport City (otherwise known as KIA West Station) is an upcoming at-grade metro station on the north-south corridor of the Blue Line of Namma Metro in Bangalore, India. This will be an important metro station that will comprise many commercial infrastructures that will be developed by BIAL, including the KIA Air Traffic Control Tower, Nadaprabhu Kempegowda Statue, a few catering manufacturing companies including SATS, Air India's SATS, Blue Dart Express, and IndiGo Hangar for maintenance and training purposes. The station is scheduled to open around June 2027.

== Construction ==
In December 2023, BIAL invited pre-qualification bids from civil engineering firms for the construction of this metro station which will be built at-grade as part of the Blue Line’s approximately 3.6 km section within Bengaluru Airport City leading up to Terminal 2 of Kempegowda International Airport (KIA). This metro station will have a built-up area of approximate 14,000 sqm. It is strategically positioned to enhance connectivity and is expected to significantly ease the commute for air travellers and contribute to the overall accessibility and efficiency of Bengaluru's metro system.

== Station Layout ==
Station Layout - To Be Confirmed

G	Street level	Exit/Entrance
L1	Mezzanine	Fare control, station agent, Metro Card vending machines, crossover
L2	Side platform | Doors will open on the left
L2	Platform # Eastbound	Towards → KIAL Terminals
L2	Platform # Westbound	Towards ← Hebbala ** Next Station: Doddajala
L2	Side platform | Doors will open on the left
L2	Note:	** To be further extended to Krishnarajapura / Central Silk Board in the future

== Connections ==
This metro station will have connections with the "Inter-Shuttle Bus" provided by KIA Airport and also with KIA Halt Railway Station for passengers and the general public who wish to travel towards the city, Yelahanka, Yesvantpur Jn or Chikkaballapur, Kolar and Bangarapet Jn.

== See also ==
- Bangalore
- List of Namma Metro stations
- Transport in Karnataka
- List of metro systems
- List of rapid transit systems in India
- Bangalore Metropolitan Transport Corporation
