= Doddajala metro station =

Upcoming Namma Metro station under Blue Line

Doddajala
- Under construction of this metro station as of October 2026 under Phase 2B of Blue Line of Namma Metro

General information
- Location: Thabarahalli, Meenakunte Hosur, Bengaluru, Karnataka 562157
- Coordinates: 13.18860°N 77.64487°E
- System: Namma Metro station
- Owner: Bangalore Metro Rail Corporation Ltd (BMRCL)
- Operator: Namma Metro
- Line: Blue Line
- Platforms: Island platform (TBC); Platform-1 → Hebbala * Platform-2 → KIAL Terminals; Platform Numbers (TBC) * (Further extension to Krishnarajapura / Central Silk Board in the future)
- Tracks: 2 (TBC)
- Connections: Doddajala Halt railway station

Construction
- Structure type: Elevated, Double track
- Platform levels: 2 (TBC)
- Parking: (TBC)
- Accessible: (TBC)

Other information
- Status: Under Construction - Architectural Finishing Works in Progress
- Station code: DDJ (TBC)

History
- Opening: June 2027; 7 months' time (TBC)
- Electrified: (TBC)

Services
| Preceding station | Namma Metro | Following station |
|---|---|---|
| Bagalur Cross towards Hebbala | Blue Line (Operational around June 2027) | Airport City towards KIAL Terminals |
| Bagalur Cross towards Krishnarajapura or Central Silk Board | Blue Line (Operational around December 2027) | Airport City towards KIAL Terminals |
Train services bound for Central Silk Board will skip Chikkajala, Bettahalasuru and proceed towards Bagalur Cross
Route map
Location

Doddajala is an upcoming elevated metro station on the North-South corridor of the Blue Line of Namma Metro in Bangalore, India. This metro station will consist of the main ITC Limited office followed by the main Navayuga Devanahalli Tollway Pvt Ltd which will lead towards Kempegowda International Airport in the form of Trumpet Interchange and towards Devanahalli, Nandi Hills, Chikkaballapur, Penukonda (Andhra Pradesh) and capital city of Telangana, Hyderabad.

This station will be considered as the depot station which will hold all Namma Metro's Blue Line trainsets for maintenance purposes. This metro station is slated to be operational around June 2027.

== History ==
On November 17 2020, the Bangalore Metro Rail Corporation Limited (BMRCL) invited bids for the construction of the Doddajala metro station, part of the 15.011 km Reach 2B – Package 3 (Bagalur Cross - KIAL Terminals) of the 37.692 km Blue Line of Namma Metro. On September 14 2021, Nagarjuna Construction Company Ltd. (NCC Ltd.) was chosen as the lowest bidder for this segment, with their proposal closely matching the initial cost estimates. As a result, the contract was awarded to the company, which led to the beginning of the construction works of this metro station as per the agreed terms.

== Station layout ==
Station Layout - To Be Confirmed

| G | Street level | Exit/Entrance |
| L1 | Mezzanine | Fare control, station agent, Ticket/token, shops |
| L2 | Platform # Northbound | Towards → KIAL Terminals; Next Station: Airport City |
| L2 | Island platform | Doors will open on the right |
| L2 | Platform # Southbound | Towards ← Hebbala ** Next Station: Bagalur Cross * |
| L2 | Note: | * Skipping Chikkajala & Bettahalasuru - Future Stations ** To be further extended to Krishnarajapura / Central Silk Board in the future |

== See also ==
- Bangalore
- List of Namma Metro stations
- Transport in Karnataka
- List of metro systems
- List of rapid transit systems in India
- Bangalore Metropolitan Transport Corporation
