= Bagalur Cross metro station =

Namma Metro station on the Blue Line in Bangalore, India

Bagalur Cross
- Under construction of this metro station as of October 2026 under Phase 2B of Blue Line of Namma Metro

General information
- Location: NH 44, Vinayak Nagar, Kattigenahalli, Bengaluru, Karnataka 560063
- Coordinates: 13.12061°N 77.61056°E
- System: Namma Metro station
- Owner: Bangalore Metro Rail Corporation Ltd (BMRCL)
- Operator: Namma Metro
- Line: Blue Line
- Platforms: Island platform (TBC); Platform-1 → Hebbala * Platform-2 → KIAL Terminals; Platform Numbers (TBC) * (Further extension to Krishnarajapura / Central Silk Board in the future)
- Tracks: 2 (TBC)

Construction
- Structure type: Elevated, Double track
- Platform levels: 2 (TBC)
- Parking: (TBC)
- Accessible: (TBC)

Other information
- Status: Under Construction - Roof Truss Installation
- Station code: BLCS (TBC)

History
- Opening: June 2027; 6 months' time (TBC)
- Electrified: (TBC)

Services
Preceding station	Namma Metro	Following station
Yelahanka towards Hebbala	Blue Line (Operational around June 2027)	Doddajala towards KIAL Terminals
Yelahanka towards Krishnarajapura or Central Silk Board	Blue Line (Operational around December 2027)	Doddajala towards KIAL Terminals
Train services bound for KIAL Terminals will skip Bettahalasuru, Chikkajala and proceed towards Doddajala
Route map
Location

Bagalur Cross is an upcoming elevated metro station on the North-South corridor of the Blue Line of Namma Metro in Bangalore, India.

This metro station will consist of the main Bagalur area with many educational institutions like Podar International School (Yelahanka), Ryan International School, Vidyashilp academy, Nitte Meenakshi Institute of Technology followed by prime locations like Amazon, Infosys, Collins Aerospace, Zodiac Clothing Company Ltd., Palannahalli Lake Park, Manipal Academy of Higher Education (Bagalur Campus) and BSF Institute of Technology.

This metro station is slated to be operational around June 2027.

== History ==
On November 17, 2020, the Bangalore Metro Rail Corporation Limited (BMRCL) invited bids for the construction of the Bagalur Cross metro station, part of the 11.678 km Reach 2B – Package 2 (Hebbala - Bagalur Cross) of the 37.692 km Blue Line of Namma Metro. On September 14, 2021, Nagarjuna Construction Company Ltd. (NCC Ltd.) was chosen as the lowest bidder for this segment, with their proposal closely matching the initial cost estimates. As a result, the contract was awarded to the company, which led to the beginning of the construction works of this metro station as per the agreed terms.

== Station layout ==
Station Layout - To Be Confirmed

G	Street level	Exit/Entrance
L1	Mezzanine	Fare control, station agent, Ticket/token, shops
L2	Platform # Northbound	Towards → KIAL Terminals; Next Station: Doddajala *
L2	Island platform | Doors will open on the right
L2	Platform # Southbound	Towards ← Hebbala ** Next Station: Yelahanka
L2	Note:	* Skipping Chikkajala & Bettahalasuru - Future Stations ** To be further extended to Krishnarajapura / Central Silk Board in the future

== See also ==
- Bangalore
- List of Namma Metro stations
- Transport in Karnataka
- List of metro systems
- List of rapid transit systems in India
- Bangalore Metropolitan Transport Corporation
