= Bangalore high-speed rail link =

Bengaluru High-Speed Rail Link

Overview
- Status: Cancelled
- Locale: Bengaluru, Karnataka
- Stations: 4

Service
- Type: High-speed rail
- Services: MG Road-Kempegowda International Airport
- Operator: Bengaluru Metro Rail Corporation Ltd. (BMRCL)

Technical
- Line length: 33 kilometres (21 mi)
- Track gauge: 1,435 mm (4 ft 8 1/2 in) standard gauge

The Bengaluru High-Speed Rail Link (BHSRL) was a proposed high-speed railway to connect Bengaluru's city centre with the Kempegowda International Airport at Devanahalli. The rail line was to have run along the eastern side of National Highway 44, and cover a distance of 33 kilometres from MG Road to the airport. The project cost was estimated to be ₹57.67 billion (US$600 million).

The project was cancelled in 2013 in favor of an extension of the Namma Metro, which was later announced and approved as the Blue Line.

== Plan ==
The Kempegowda International Airport was located in Devanahalli, 36 kilometres away from the city centre. The airport was built at this location, since the old airport, HAL Airport, was located in the city centre and had no room for expansion when the airport hit a limit of 10 million passengers. After the new airport was opened, the only way to reach the airport was by NH 44. A flyover and 2 toll gates were constructed to connect the airport to the highway.

As of now, only cars and buses can drive to the airport. In 2021, a railway station was opened on the boundary of the airport. It later became imperative to build a fast link between the city and the airport, since traffic jams prevented flyers from reaching the airport on time and in turn, some missed their flights.

The Government of Karnataka then proposed to build a high-speed rail link between MG Road and the airport, along NH 44. Four stations, Cubbon Road, Hebbal, Yelahanka and Airport Terminal were the planned locations for these stations. The line was to be owned by the Bengaluru Metro Rail Corporation Ltd. (BMRCL)

The line was expected to carry air travellers at speeds up to 160 km/h between the airport and MG Road with a travel time of approximately 25 minutes.

== Cancellation ==
In June 2012, Karnataka chief secretary S.V. Ranganath asked BMRCL to prepare a note on including an extension to the airport in Phase 2 of the Namma Metro network. Under the new plan, Phase 2B, the Central Silk Board-Nagawara line, later named the Blue Line, will be extended to the airport. The extension, from Nagawara to the airport, is estimated to cost ₹50 billion (US$520 million) and will be implemented in a public–private partnership mode. The extension was approved and construction started in 2021. Initially, the travel time is expected to be 44 minutes but may go up to 55 minutes as more stations are added to the route. Although the high-speed rail link was expected to carry passengers to the airport in 29 minutes, it will be more expensive to build than the Blue Line. As a result, the high-speed rail link was cancelled. The Blue Line is expected to be operational around 2025.

== See also ==
- List of rapid transit systems
