= Chikkajala =

- Sub urban city
- Location in Karnataka, India Chikkajala (India)
- Coordinates: 13.170457°N 77.632883°E
- Country: India
- State: Karnataka
- District: Bangalore Urban

Area
  - Total: 2.52 km^{2} (0.97 sq mi)

Population (2011)
  - Total: 6,154
  - Density: 2,440/km^{2} (6,320/sq mi)
- Time zone: UTC+5:30 (IST)
- Vehicle registration: KA-50
- literacy rate: 76.97
- Sex ratio: 1.26

Chikkajala is a village in the Bangalore Urban district of Karnataka, India.

== History ==
The village has the ruins of an ancient Fort, known as Chikkajala Fort. There are also temple ruins beside the fort. Hoysala king, Vishnuvardhana (1108–1152) constructed the ancient Chennaraya (Chennakeshava) temple in the village.

== Demographics ==
According to the 2011 Census of India, Chikkajala had a population of 6,154 and a total area of 2.52 km^{2}. Males and females constituted 55.72 per cent and 44.28 per cent respectively of the population. Literacy at that time was 76.97 per cent. People classified as Scheduled Castes and Scheduled Tribes under India's system of positive discrimination accounted for 25.33 per cent and 3.67 per cent respectively of the population.

== Photos ==
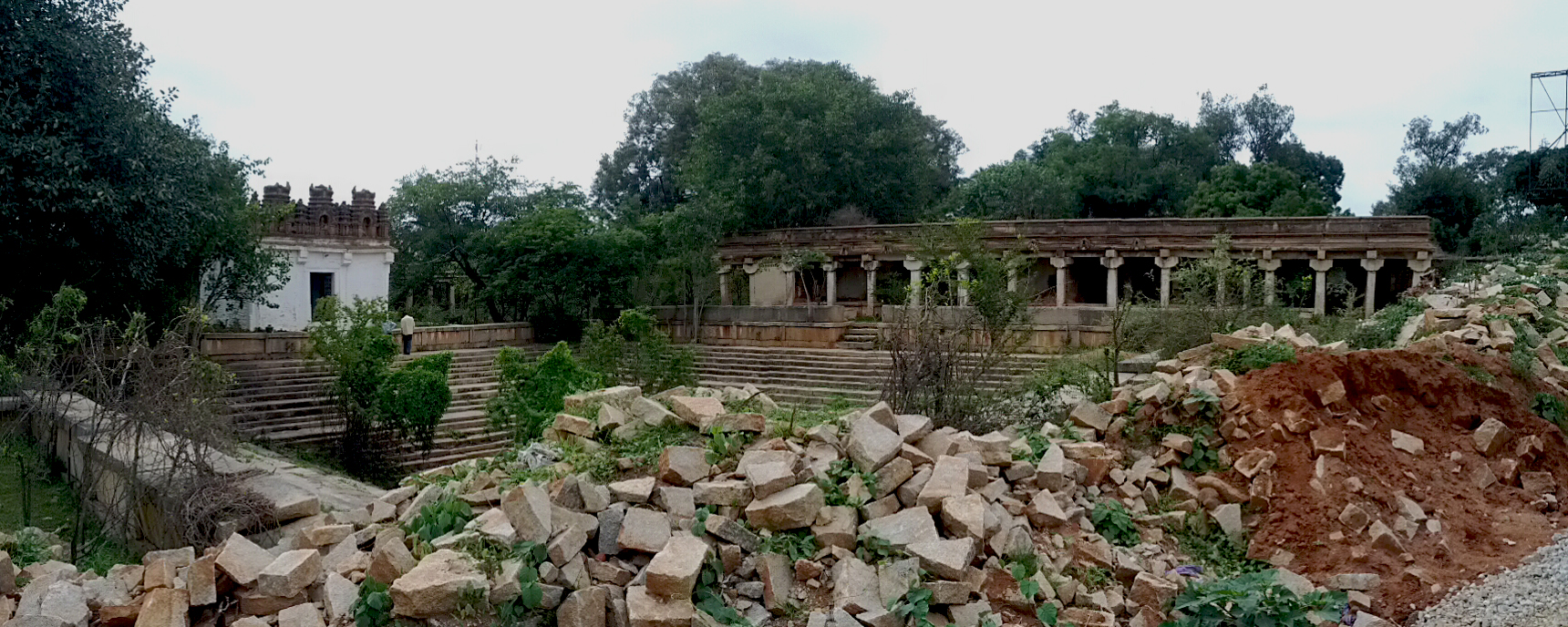
Chikkajala

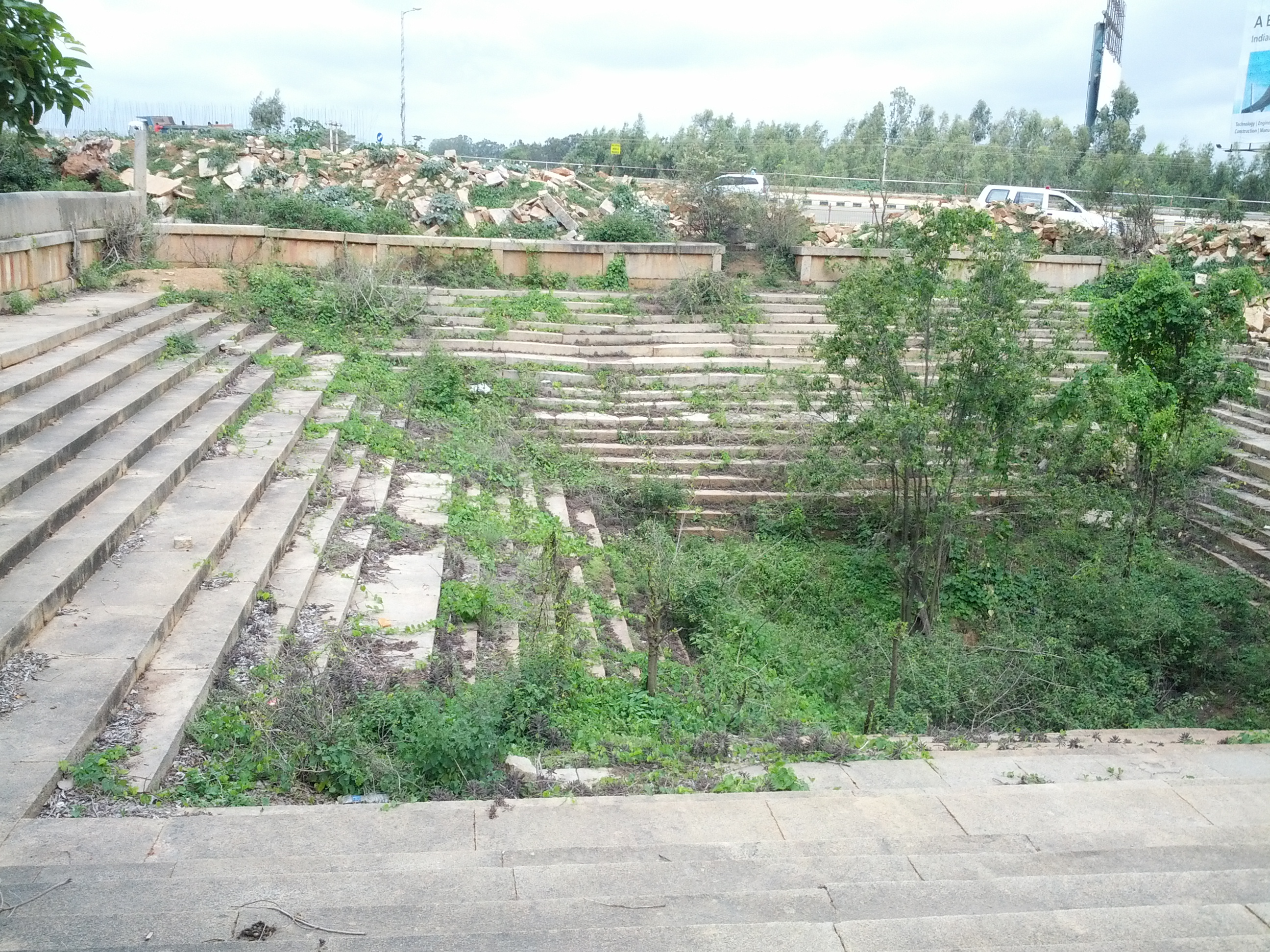
Chikkajala
