= Blue Line (Namma Metro) =

Metro line in Bengaluru, India

Overview
- Other names: ORR East Line; Airport Metro; Line 5; Central Silk Board - KIAL Terminals Line
- Native name: ನೀಲಿ ಮಾರ್ಗ (Neeli mārga)
- Owner: Bangalore Metro Rail Corporation Limited (BMRCL)
- Locale: Bengaluru, Karnataka, India
- Termini: Central Silk Board; KIAL Terminals
- Connecting lines: Operational (3): Purple Line Yellow Line Pink Line; Upcoming (2): Red Line Orange Line
- Stations: 13 (Phase-2A) + 16 (Phase-2B) = 29; 03 (Phase-2B) - Future stations
- Website: bmrc.co.in

Service
- Type: Metro
- System: Namma Metro
- Depot(s): Baiyappanahalli, Doddajala

History
- Planned opening: Phase 2A - December 2027; 1 year's time Phase 2B - December 2028; 2 years' time

Technical
- Line length: 58.19 km (36.16 mi)
- Num of tracks: 2
- Character: Elevated, At Grade, Underground
- Track gauge: 1,435 mm (4 ft 8 1/2 in) standard gauge
- Electrification: 750 V DC third rail

The Blue Line is part of the Namma Metro rail network for the city of Bangalore, Karnataka, India. It consists of two sections - Phase-2A (Central Silk Board to Krishnarajapura) and Phase-2B (Krishnarajapura to Airport). Construction of Phase-2A began in August 2021. Construction of Phase-2B began in February 2022. The 58.19 km line connects Central Silk Board with the Kempegowda International Airport.

The line passes through the eastern part of Outer Ring Road and passes through many major tech hubs and neighbourhoods of the city, such as HSR Layout, Agara, Bellandur, Kadubeesanahalli, Marathahalli, Doddanekundi, Mahadevapura, Krishnarajapura, Kasturi Nagar, Horamavu, Kalyan Nagar, Hennur, Nagawara, Hebbal and then runs parallelly along the National Highway 44, where it passes through Kodigehalli, Jakkur, Yelahanka, Doddajala and then passes along the Airport Road.

The Line is mostly elevated but also has 2 at-grade (surface) sections, at the AFS Yelahanka Campus Bengaluru, and the Airport City station, and also has 1 underground section - at the KIA Terminals . There are 29 stations on the line of which 27 are elevated, 1 is at grade, and 1 is underground - making it the second line, after Purple Line, in the Namma Metro system to contain all 3 station types. The Blue Line will have interchanges with the Yellow Line at Central Silk Board, Purple Line at Krishnarajapura, Pink Line at Nagawara, Orange Line at Kempapura and a planned triple interchange with the proposed Orange Line and Red Line at Hebbal.

Between Benniganahalli and Kasturi Nagar, a 500-metre section of the Bengaluru Suburban Rail Project's Mallige Line was redesigned to share infrastructure with Blue Line. Under this arrangement, the Kanaka line viaduct of the suburban rail network will run directly below the Blue Line viaduct for approximately 500 metres adjacent to the Benniganahalli flyover.

In June 2022, the BMRCL launched the first ever U Girder span on ORR-Airport metro line. The extension of the Purple Line and construction of the Yellow Line is completed and operational, where Construction of Pink Line is currently under progress. The Pink, Yellow and Blue lines will be CBTC-signaling enabled, unlike Namma Metro's first two lines (Purple and Green lines use distance-signaling). In June 2023, the Deputy Chief Minister of Karnataka D. K. Shivakumar informed that Metro line to Kempegowda International Airport will be completed by December 2026, plus or minus 3 months.

== History ==
History
Phase	Section	Planned Opening	Terminals		Length	Stations
2A	P2A ORR	June 2027	Central Silk Board	Kadubeesanahalli	9.9 km (6.2 mi)	7
2A	P2A ORR	March 2027	Kadubeesanahalli	Krishnarajapura	9.85 km (6.12 mi)	6
2B	P2B APL	March 2028	Krishnarajapura	Kempapura	11.35 km (7.05 mi)	8
2B	P2B APL	September 2027	Kempapura	KIAL Terminals	27.09 km (16.83 mi)	8
Total			Central Silk Board	KIAL Terminals	58.19 km (36.16 mi)	29

The routes under Phase-2A and Phase-2B (Blue Line) were at first considered a part of the Phase-3 of metro development, but were prioritized under Phase-2, as the Central Government requested BMRCL to begin work on the airport link as early as February 2012.

The route from Central Silkboard to K R Pura along the eastern part of Outer Ring Road (ORR) was included as Phase-2A since development on that part of ORR had leap-frogged much ahead of the rest of the city with huge number of new office buildings. As a result, traffic increased several fold with employees traveling from different parts of the city to this new CBD. Chief Minister of Karnataka, Siddaramaiah announced in September 2016 that a new 18 km (11.2 mi) line connecting Central Silk Board with KR Pura along ORR would be included in Phase 2 as Phase-2A of the project at an estimated cost of ₹4202 crores.

Kempegowda International Airport (opened during May 2008) being very far from city center (about 35 km), commuting time by road in traffic congestion is time-consuming. Hence, attention for building a fast mass transit was in the minds of planners from the very beginning, especially since air traffic had kept increasing. The old airport in Bengaluru, the HAL Airport, located well within the city, had closed for commercial operations as part of the terms of the PPP for the new airport.

To connect airport to city, there had initially been a proposal to build a 33 km (21 mi) high speed rail line from MG Road to Kempegowda International Airport (KIA). Cost was estimated at ₹5,767 crore (US$810 million). This was to be executed by an independent SPV - Bangalore Airport Rail Link Limited (BARLL). However, the plan for an exclusive city-airport high speed rail was canceled during October 2013 due to high cost and viability concerns.

It was decided that BMRCL would manage the airport rail project and a regular metro line with fewer halts would be built instead of a high speed rail. Following this, suggestions were invited from public during September 2016 to choose any one of nine possible extension routes from existing and proposed metro lines to the airport. The proposed extension routes had an average length of 30 km (19 mi), and cost estimates ranged between ₹4,500 crore and ₹7,000 crore. A 25.9 km (16.1 mi) extension from Nagawara via Kannur and Bagaluru was the shortest, while the 35.4 km (22.0 mi) extension from Yeshwanthpur via Yelahanka, Kannur and Bagaluru was the longest of the proposed routes. BMRC received 1,300 responses from the public. The shortest (25.9 km, 16.1 mi) extension of the Kalena Agrahara (previously Gottigere) – Nagawara line via Kannur and Bagaluru to the airport emerged as the most popular choice. In February 2017, the Centre requested BMRC to start work on the airport link before Phase 3. Thus, the Airport Line was included in Phase 2 as Phase 2B.

Since the airport's managing company, Bengaluru International Airport Limited (BIAL) forbade underground construction from the southern side of the airport due to security concerns as it would have to pass beneath the airport's second runway, the shortest route options (i.e. extending the Pink line from Nagawara directly north) were eliminated. An alternate route proceeding north till RK Hegde Nagar and then turning west to Jakkur and then along Airport Road was explored. Bangalore Development Minister K. J. George announced on 12 May 2017 that the government had finalized the Nagawara—Ramakrishna Hegde Nagar—Jakkur—Yelahanka route to the airport. However, this route had an obstacle as a high-pressure petroleum pipeline was passing through the originally proposed route.

This was changed and on 10 January 2019, the State Cabinet approved a change in alignment for the proposed metro line to the airport. The new line would begin at Krishnarajapura (K.R. Pura) and be aligned along the northern part of ORR (Outer Ring road), passing Kasturinagar, Nagawara, Hebbal, and Jakkur before heading towards the airport. The line would be 38 km (23.6 mi) long, about 9 km (5.6 mi) longer than the route previously proposed, estimated to cost ₹10,584 crore (US$1.5 billion).

== Tendering ==
Blue Line
Pre-Construction Activity
Tendering	Section	Activity	Successful Bid /Cost	Contractor	Award
Phase-2A/ORR/2018/Demolition/DLN-9/35	Central Silk Board to K. R. Pura	Demolition	₹2.24 crore (US$240,000)	B R Chawla Demolition	12 Oct 2018
Phase-2A & 2B/Via & Stns /PMC/2020/72	Central Silk Board to KIAL	Project Management Consultant	₹20.58 crore (US$2.2 million)	RITES	17 Dec 2021
Phase-2A&2B/DDC/Sec-1	Central Silk Board - HBR Layout	Detailed Design Consultant	₹8.30 crore (US$890,000)	SMEC International	07 Feb 2020
Phase-2A&2B/DDC/Sec-2	HBR Layout - KIAL Airport	Detailed Design Consultant	₹6.26 crore (US$670,000)	AECOM – CEG JV	12 Feb 2020
Airport Depot & Byp Depot/DDC/2021/76	Baiyappanahalli & Airport Depot	Detailed Design Consultant	₹3.94 crore (US$420,000)	AECOM – CEG JV	16 Sept 2021
CE-US/ELE/EHV/ORR/PH-2A	Central Silk Board to K.R. Pura	Conversion of Electrical Lines	₹19.13 crore (US$2.0 million)	Rahul Cables	13 May 2022
Miscellaneous		KR Pura - KIAL Airport	₹9.27 crore (US$990,000)	Various	19 Dec 2020
Total			₹69.72 crore (US$7.4 million)		
Civil Work
Tendering	Section	Length	Successful Bid /Cost	Contractor	Award
Package 2A/P1/60(a)	Central Silk Board - Kodibeesanahalli	9.859 km (6.126 mi)	₹785.25 crore (US$84 million)	Afcons	25 May 2021
Package 2A/P2/60(b)	Kodibeesanahalli - KR Pura	9.774 km (6.073 mi)	₹623.55 crore (US$67 million)	Shankaranarayana	25 May 2021
Package 2B/P2/69(a)	KR Pura - Kempapura	11.003 km (6.837 mi)	₹739.04 crore (US$79 million)	NCC	17 Nov 2021
Package 2B/P2/69(b)	Kempapura - Bagalur Cross	11.678 km (7.256 mi)	₹747.99 crore (US$80 million)	NCC	17 Nov 2021
Package 2B/P2/69(c)	Bagalur Cross - KIAL Terminals	15.011 km (9.327 mi)	₹680.21 crore (US$73 million)	NCC	17 Nov 2021
Veerannapalya Station			₹35.74 crore (US$3.8 million)	URC Constructions	07 Feb 2025
Total		58.19 km (36.16 mi)	₹3,611.78 crore (US$390 million)		
Depot Work
Tendering			Successful Bid /Cost	Contractor	Award
Remodelling Baiyappanahalli Depot			₹249.19 crore (US$27 million)	J Kumar – AICPL JV	18 Mar 2023
Airport Depot			₹182.39 crore (US$19 million)	J Kumar – AICPL JV	18 Mar 2023
Total			₹431.58 crore (US$46 million)		
Architectural Finishing Works
Tendering			Successful Bid /Cost	Contractor	Award
Package 2A-A1	Central Silk Board - Kadubeesanahalli		₹65.58 crore (US$7.0 million)	MR Constructions	16 Dec 2024
Package 2A-A2	Kodibeesanahalli - KR Pura		₹66.78 crore (US$7.1 million)	Godrej & Boyce	09 Nov 2024
Phase-2B/Arch. Works/A2/RT/2025/136	Hebbal - Doddajala		₹72.21 crore (US$7.7 million)	NSL Construction	19 Jan 2026
Phase-2B/Arch. Works/A1/2025/129	Kasturi Nagar - Kempapura		₹95.16 crore (US$10 million)	Bridge and Roof	04 Feb 2026
Total			₹299.73 crore (US$32 million)		
Miscellaneous
Tendering			Successful Bid /Cost	Contractor	Award
Land Acquisition			₹2,762 crore (US$300 million)	N/A	2020
Phase-2A and 2B/Plantations/2023/95	Plantation and Maintenance of Trees		₹7.29 crore (US$780,000)	Various	28 Mar 2023
Phase-2A and 2B/Track Work/2022/93	Ballastless Track Work		₹500.94 crore (US$54 million)	Larsen & Toubro	02 Jun 2023
5RS-DM	Rolling Stock (222 Coaches)		₹2,217.78 crore (US$240 million)	BEML	08 Aug 2023
Phase-2A & 2B/Turnouts /2023/101	Track Turnout		₹29.98 crore (US$3.2 million)	Vossloh	22 Mar 2024
EPC6-CC	Engineering, Supply, Erection, Testing and Commissioning of Power Supply		₹248.61 crore (US$27 million)	KEC International	10 Jun 2024
EPC5-CC	750V DC Third Rail electrification		₹764.64 crore (US$82 million)	Siemens – RVNL JV	11 Jun 2024
Signalling System (CBTC) & PSD			₹548.48 crore (US$59 million)	Alstom	12 Jun 2024
Phase II/ 9 ESCAL - DM	Elevators & Escalators		₹203.08 crore (US$22 million)	Johnson Lifts	6 Feb 2025
E&M-6	Electrical & Mechanical		₹197.04 crore (US$21 million)	Jakson	7 Feb 2025
Phase II/6 ELEV-DM	Machine Room Less Gearless Elevators		₹45.31 crore (US$4.8 million)		20 Mar 2025
BMRCL/Travellator (R5 CSB to Ph2A/P1 CSB)/ Works /2026/146	Travellator and Connecting Walkway between Yellow Line and Blue line ORR Central Silk Board Metro Stations (to be completed in 9 months after successful bidding)		Milan Road Buildtech		
Phase-2B/Arch. Works/A1/2025/129	Automatic Fare Collection System		Tenders Under Evaluation		
Total			₹7,435.15 crore (US$790 million)		
Total Line Cost			₹11,847.96 crore (US$1.3 billion)		

=== Phase-2A ===
BMRCL prepared the detailed project report for the proposed Central Silk Board - KR Pura Line and submitted the DPR to the state government on 28 October 2016. Phase 2A was approved by the State Cabinet on 1 March 2017.

Tenders for the ORR (East) Metro line were called in February 2018 and IL&FS emerged the lowest bidder for all packages. However, the tenders were quashed due to cash flow problems and bankruptcy proceedings by the selected firm, IL&FS. A second round of tendering was done in December 2019. The project cost was revised to ₹5994 crores. Fresh bids were received by multiple firms in March 2020. There are two packages. The first package included 2.84 km of ramps for a flyover at Central Silk board junction in addition to 9.859 km of viaduct with six elevated stations. The second package was for 8.377 km viaduct with seven elevated stations, 1.097 km depot line and a 0.30 km pocket track.

Central government's approval was much delayed and finally received in April-2021. Tenders were awarded in May-2021 and construction on Phase-2A finally began in August-2021. Opening of this phase is by March 2027.

=== Phase-2B ===
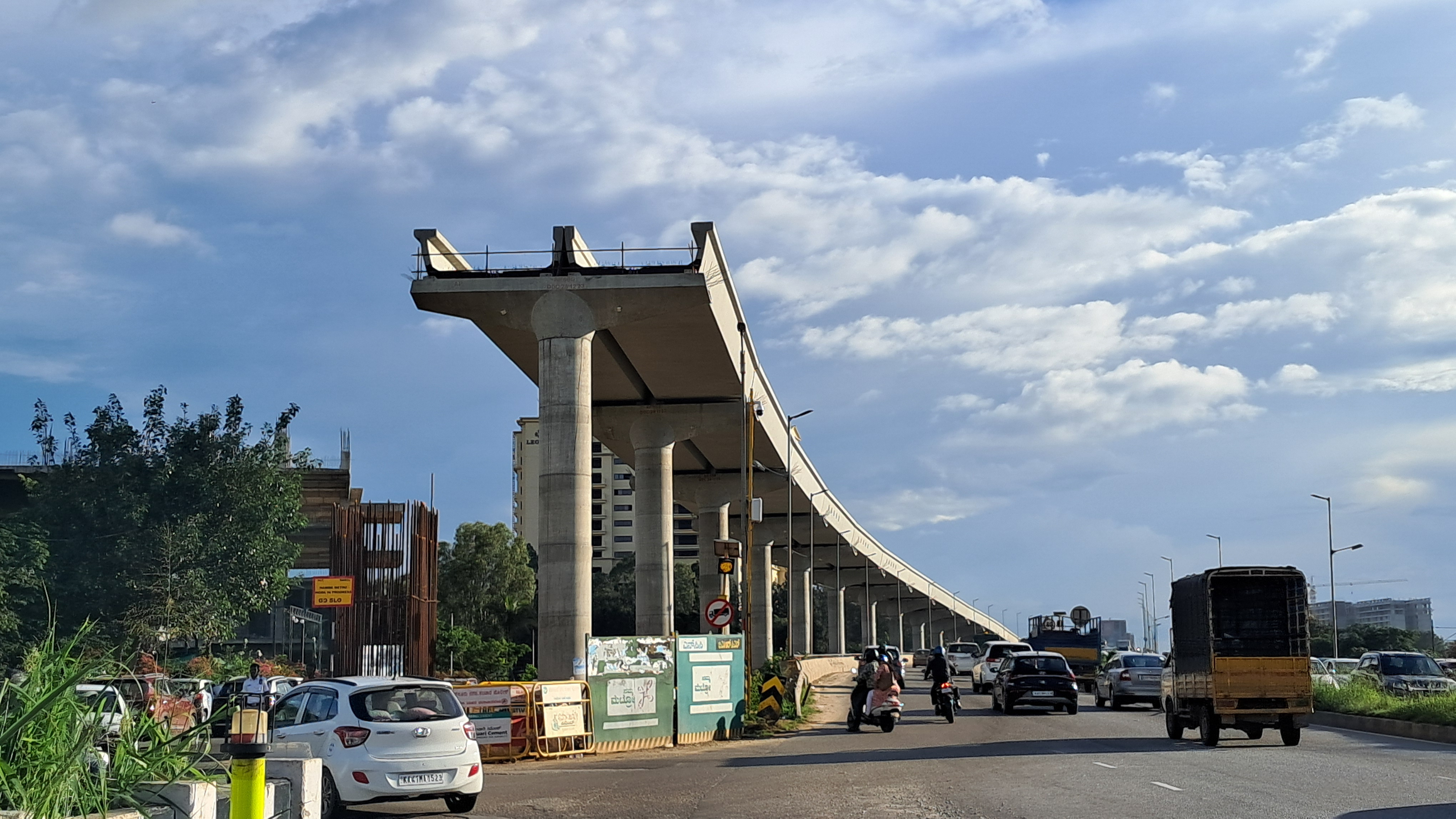
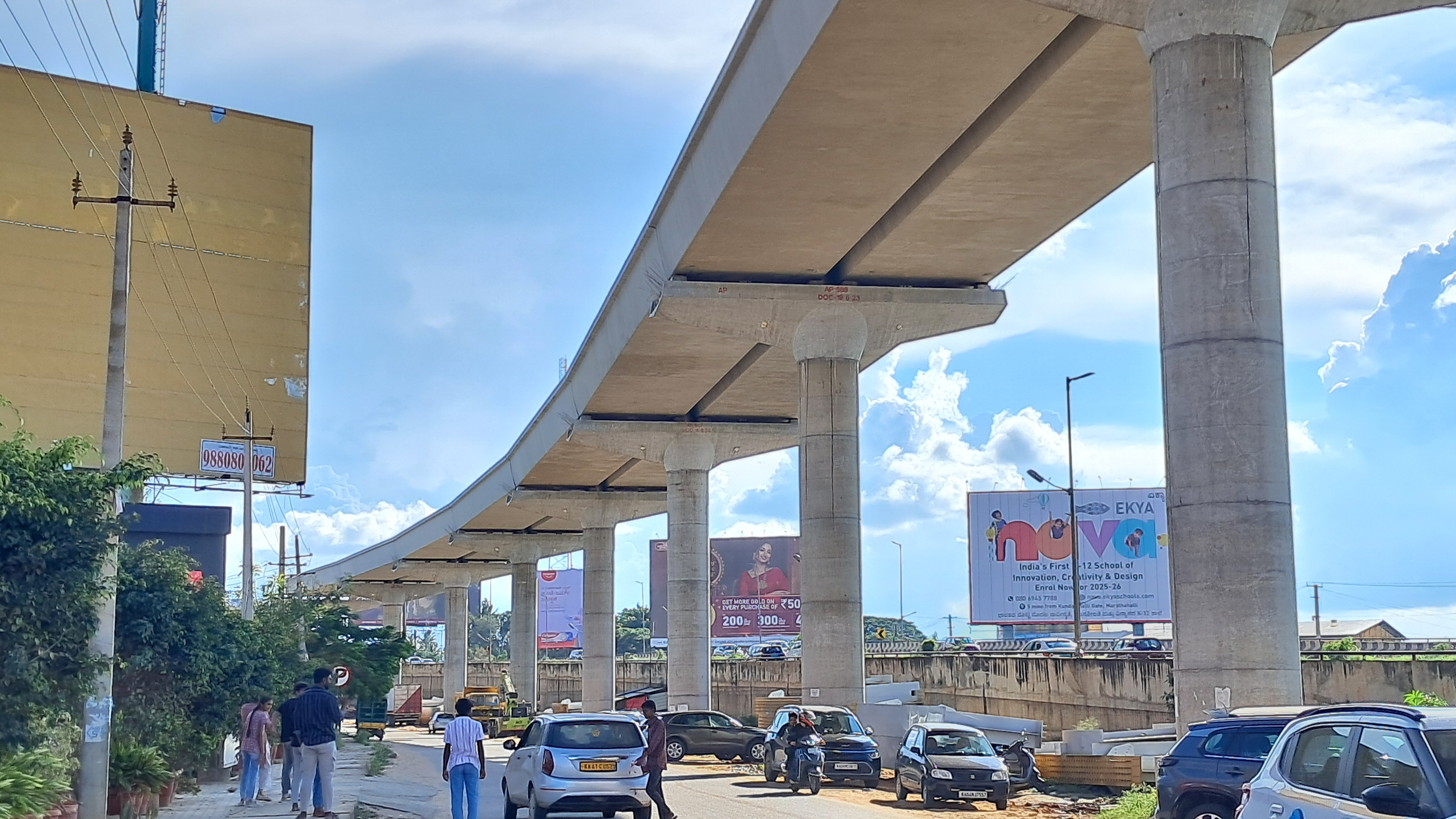
Installation of U-Girders (Hebbala - KIAL Terminals stretch) under Blue Line of Namma Metro as of October 2024
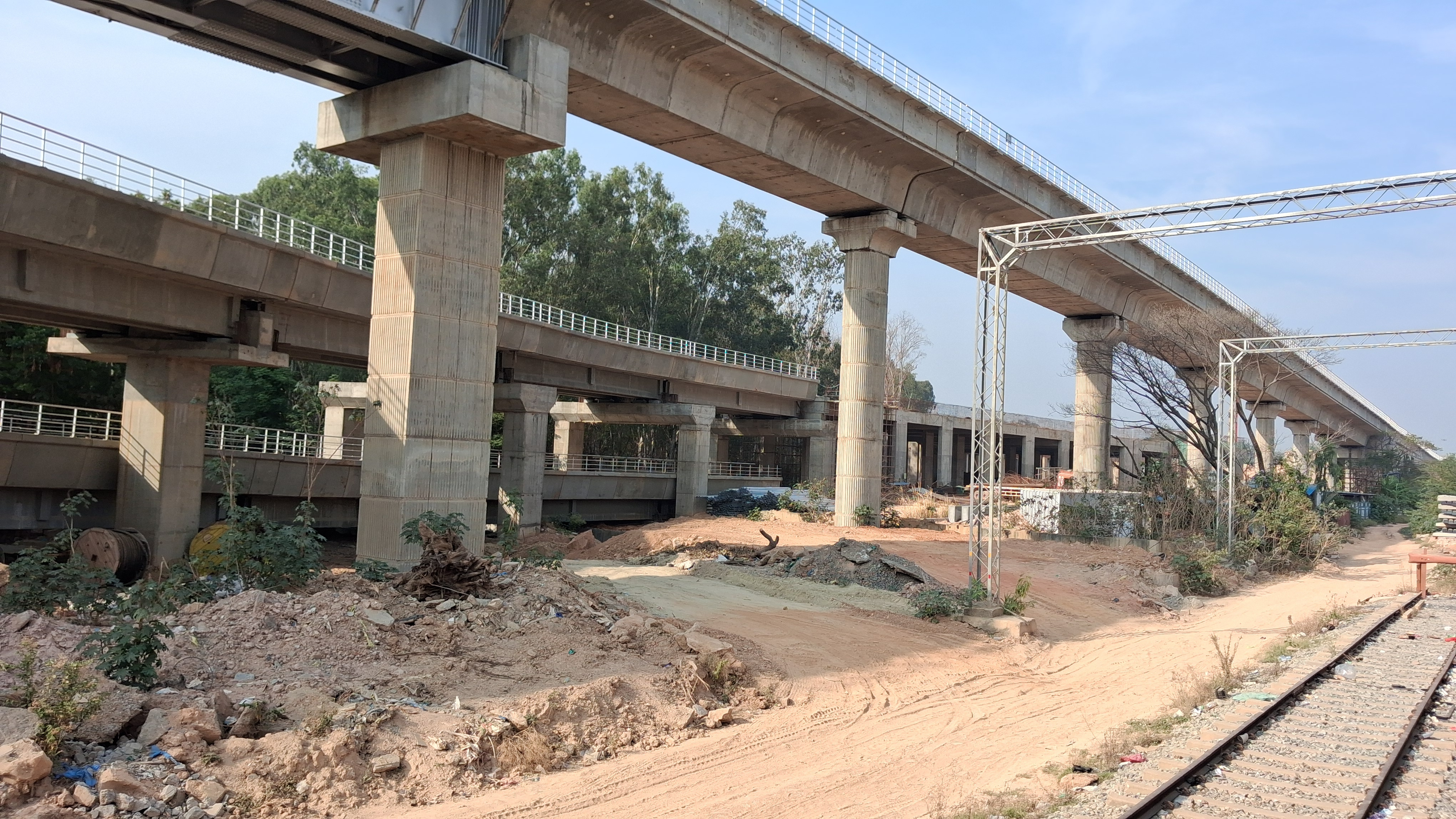
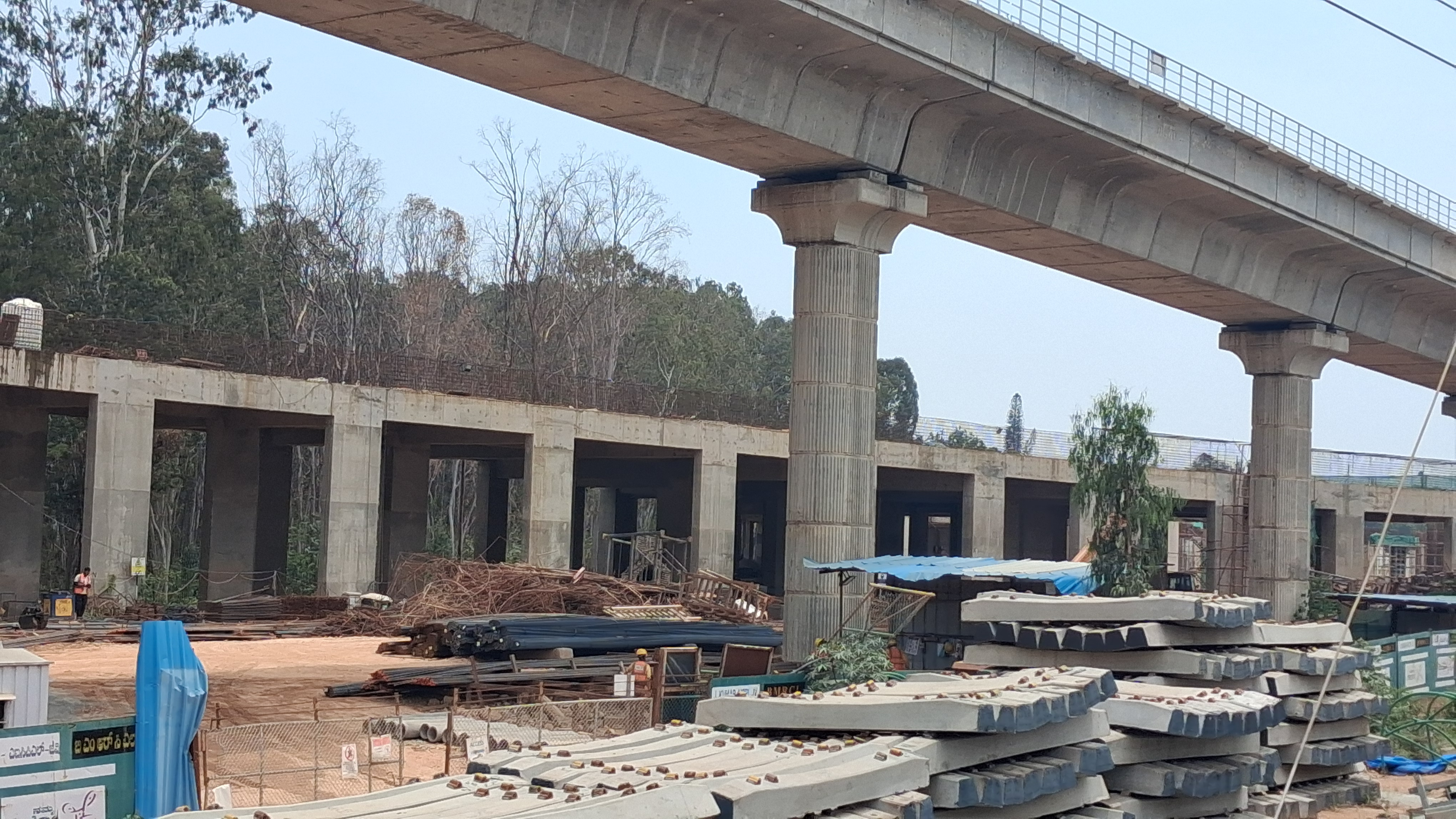
Under Construction of the Re-Development of Baiyappanahalli Coach Depot for this upcoming metro line as of April 2026

DPR for the Airport Line had been prepared in September 2017 and cleared by Government of Karnataka in January 2019.

Tenders for the Airport line were called in July 2020. There are three packages. The first package was for 11.003 km viaduct, including 281 mtrs viaduct beyond Phase-2A with eight elevated stations and 650 mtrs link line to Baiyyappanahalli depot. The second package was for 11.678 km viaduct with 250 mtrs pocket track and two elevated stations. The third package was for 15.011 km viaduct, including 718.18 mtrs cut and cover portion in front of Yelahanka Air Force Station. All three packages include road widening, utility diversion and allied works.

Bettadahalasuru station would be built by Embassy group at a cost of ₹140 crore. Kempegowda International Airport is likely to fund the construction of two airport stations off the highway. An MoU was signed between BMRC and KIAL for construction of the 4.95 km (3.08 mi) line and stations entailing an investment of ₹800 crore.

Central government's approval was delayed and finally received in April 2021. Nagarjuna Construction Company (NCC) emerged as the lowest bidder to construct the line on September 16, 2021. Construction finally began in February 2022. Opening of this phase as per August 2022 from MD of BMRCL is expected around December 2027.

Veerannapalya Station was initially awarded to NCC as part of Package 2B/P2/69(a). However, due to a severe delay in shifting an underground gas pipeline the station was unloaded from NCC scope of work. BMRCL re-invited tenders for this station, which was later awarded to URC Constructions.

== Controversies and Accidents ==
In January 2023, an accident occurred wherein a reinforcement cage of an under-construction metro pier fell onto a woman - Tejaswini Sulakhe - and her son Vihan in HBR Layout, which led to their death. In respose, BMRCL announced a financial assistance package of ₹20 lakh to the victims' family. Separately, Chief Minister Basavaraj Bommai also announced a separate compensation of ₹10 lakh for each victim, taken from the Chief Ministers’ Relief Fund.

== Funding ==
In totality, the 58.19-km line consisting of both Phase 2A and 2B is estimated to cost ₹14,788 crores.

The Union and State governments will contribute ₹3,973 crore by way of equity and subordinate debt. Land acquisition costs, estimated at ₹2,762 crore, will be funded by the Government of Karnataka. BMRCL will raise the remaining amount of ₹5,960 crores through loans. In March 2021, it entered into a loan agreement with Japan International Cooperation Agency (JICA) for US$318 million (₹2,317 crore). BMRCL also raised US$500 million (₹3,643 crore) from the Asian Development Bank (ADB) to fund construction of the Blue Line (Phase 2A and 2B).

On June 10, 2024, Rail Vikas Nigam Ltd. (RVNL) disclosed in a BSE filing that its joint venture with Siemens had secured a contract worth approximately ₹762 crore from Bangalore Metro Rail Corporation. This contract encompasses the 750V DC third rail electrification work under package EPC5-CC for the 57 km Blue Line of the Namma Metro.

== Stations ==
The Blue Line will have 29 stations.

=== Interchanges ===
Passenger interchange facilities, connecting to other metro and railway lines, will be provided at the following stations:

- Central Silk Board (Connects to the Yellow Line, which runs between Rashtreeya Vidyalaya Road to Bommasandra)
- Agara (Connects to the Red Line, which runs between Hebbal to Sarjapura)
- Ibbaluru (Connects to the Red Line, which runs between Hebbal to Sarjapura)
- Krishnarajapura (Connects to the Purple Line, which runs between Whitefield (Kadugodi) to Challaghatta, and also connects to the Krishnarajapuram railway station)
- Kasturi Nagar (Connects to the Channasandra railway station)
- Nagawara (Connects to the Pink Line, which runs between Nagawara and Kalena Agrahara)
- Kempapura (Connects to the Orange Line, which runs between JP Nagar 4th Phase and Kempapura)
- Hebbal (Connects to the Orange Line, which runs between JP Nagar 4th Phase and Kempapura and to the Red Line, which runs from Hebbal to Sarjapura)
- KIAL Terminals (Connects to the Kempegowda International Airport)

Blue Line
#	Station Name		Expected Openings	Connections	Station Layout	Platform Level Type
#	English	Kannada	Expected Openings	Connections	Station Layout	Platform Level Type
Phase 2A
1	Central Silk Board	ಕೇಂದ್ರ ರೇಷ್ಮೆ ಮಂಡಳಿ	December 2027	Yellow Line	Elevated	Side
2	HSR Layout	ಎಚ್‌ ಎಸ್‌ ಆರ್ ಬಡಾವಣೆ	December 2027		Elevated	Side
3	Agara	ಅಗರ	December 2027	Red Line (Approved)	Elevated	Side
4	InMobi Ibbaluru	ಇನ್‌ಮೊಬಿ ಇಬ್ಬಲೂರು	December 2027	Red Line (Approved)	Elevated	Side
5	Prestige Bellanduru	ಪ್ರೆಸ್ಟೀಜ್ ಬೆಳ್ಳಂದೂರು	December 2027		Elevated	Side
6	Embassy TechVillage Devarabeesanahalli	ಎಂಬೆಸ್ಸಿ ಟೆಕ್ ವಿಲೇಜ್ ದೇವರಬೀಸನಹಳ್ಳಿ	December 2027		Elevated	Side
7	Kadubeesanahalli	ಕಾಡುಬೀಸನಹಳ್ಳಿ	December 2027		Elevated	Side
8	Marathahalli	ಮಾರತಹಳ್ಳಿ	December 2027		Elevated	Side
9	ISRO	ಇಸ್ರೋ	December 2027		Elevated	Side
10	Doddanekundi	ದೊಡ್ಡನೆಕ್ಕುಂದಿ	December 2027		Elevated	Side
11	Bagmane Developers - DRDO Sports Complex	ಬಾಗ್ಮನೆ ಡೆವಲಪರ್ಸ್ - ರ.ಸಂ.ಅ.ಸಂ. ಕ್ರೀಡಾ ಸಂಕೀರ್ಣ	December 2027		Elevated	Side
12	Saraswathi Nagara	ಸರಸ್ವತಿ ನಗರ	December 2027		Elevated	Side
13	Krishnarajapura (K.R.Pura)	ಕೃಷ್ಣರಾಜಪುರ (ಕೆ.ಆರ್.ಪುರ)	December 2027	Purple Line; Krishnarajapuram	Elevated	Side
	Phase 2B					
14	Kasturi Nagara	ಕಸ್ತೂರಿ ನಗರ	December 2028	Channasandra	Elevated	Side
15	Horamavu	ಹೊರಮಾವು	December 2028		Elevated	Side
16	HRBR Layout	ಎಚ್‌ ಆರ್‌ ಬಿ ಆರ್ ಬಡಾವಣೆ	December 2028		Elevated	Side
17	Kalyana Nagara	ಕಲ್ಯಾಣ ನಗರ	December 2028		Elevated	Side
18	HBR Layout	ಎಚ್‌ ಬಿ ಆರ್ ಬಡಾವಣೆ	December 2028		Elevated	Side
19	Nagawara	ನಾಗವಾರ	December 2028	Pink Line (Under Construction)	Elevated	Side & Island
20	Veerannapalya	ವೀರಣ್ಣಪಾಳ್ಯ	December 2028		Elevated	Side
21	Kempapura	ಕೆಂಪಾಪುರ	December 2028	Orange Line (Approved)	Elevated	Side
22	Hebbala	ಹೆಬ್ಬಾಳ	December 2028	Orange Line (Approved) Red Line (Approved)	Elevated	Side
23	Kodigehalli	ಕೊಡಿಗೇಹಳ್ಳಿ	December 2028		Elevated	Island
24	Jakkuru Cross	ಜಕ್ಕೂರು ಕ್ರಾಸ್	December 2028		Elevated	Island
25	Yelahanka	ಯಲಹಂಕ	December 2028		Elevated	Island
26	Bagaluru Cross	ಬಾಗಲೂರು ಕ್ರಾಸ್	December 2028		Elevated	Island
27	Doddajala	ದೊಡ್ಡಜಾಲ	December 2028		Elevated	Island
28	Airport City	ವಿಮಾನ ನಿಲ್ದಾಣ ನಗರ	December 2028	Airport City (Proposed)	At-Grade	Side
29	KIAL Terminals	ಕೆಂಪೇಗೌಡ ಅಂತಾರಾಷ್ಟ್ರೀಯ ವಿಮಾನ ನಿಲ್ದಾಣ	December 2028	Kempegowda International Airport	Underground	Island

== See also ==
- Namma Metro
  - Purple Line
  - Green Line
  - Yellow Line
  - Pink Line
  - Orange Line
  - Grey Line
  - Red Line
  - Inner Ring Line
- List of Namma Metro Stations
- Rapid transit in India
- List of metro systems
