= Kolar railway station =

Railway station in Karnataka, India

Kolar

General information
- Location: Bangapet Road, Kanakanapalya, Kolar; Karnataka; India
- Coordinates: 13°07′26.4″N 78°07′58.5″E
- Elevation: 835 metres (2,740 ft)
- System: Indian Railways station
- Owner: Indian Railways
- Operator: South Western Railway
- Line: Yelahanka–Bangarpet line
- Platforms: 3
- Tracks: 3

Construction
- Structure type: Standard on ground

Other information
- Station code: KQZ
- Zone(s): South Western Railway zone
- Division(s): Bangalore
Location
- Location within Karnataka Location within India

Kolar railway station (station code:KQZ) is a NSG-6 category Indian railway station in Bangalore railway division of South Western Railway zone. It is located between Hudukula and Jannagatta Halt stations in Yelahanka–Bangarapet line.

== History ==
The 2 ft 6 in (762 mm) wide narrow-gauge line between Bowringpet (later Bangarapet) and Kolar was opened in 1913 by Mysore State Railway. The narrow-gauge Yeshvantapur–Devanhalli–Chikballapur line was opened in 1915, Bowringpet-Kolar 2'6" line extended to Chintamani / Chikkaballapur in 1916 (forming the Kolar District Rly.) by the Mysore State Railway and was finally linked to Bangalore via Sidlaghatta, Chintamani, Srinivasapura under Yelahanka–Bangarapet narrow-gauge line in 1918. Gauge conversion of the Bangarpet–Kolar line was completed and opened for traffic in 1997 and since then it has been serviced by a railbus. Gauge conversion of Yelankha–Chickballapur was completed and opened for traffic in 2004. Then, gauge conversion of Chickballapur–Kolar was completed and opened for traffic in November 2013, thus connecting the entire network into an Yelankha–Bangarpet broad-gauge line.
