= KIAL Terminals metro station =

Upcoming Namma Metro station under Blue Line

KIAL Terminals
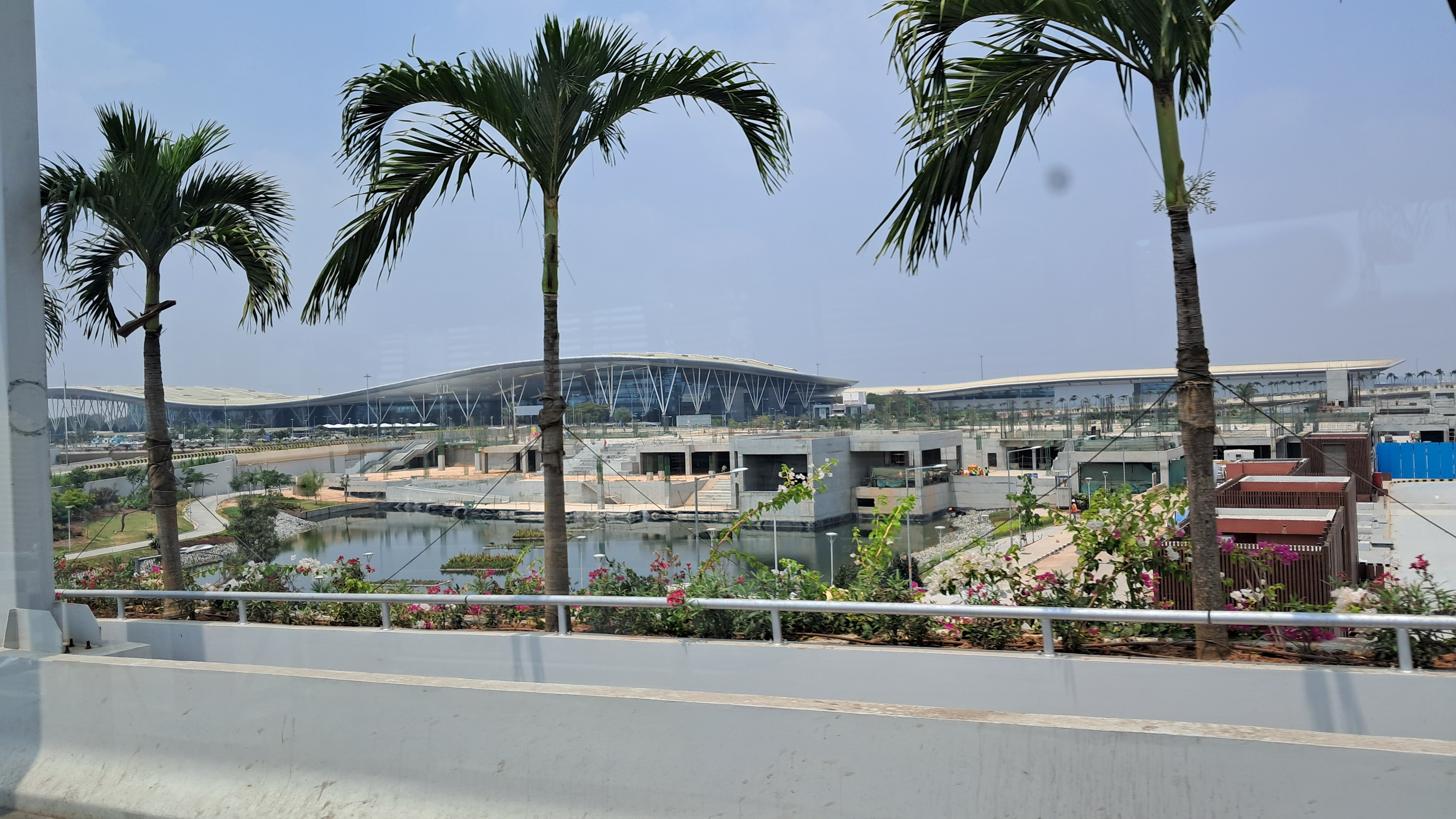
- Under Construction of KIAL Terminals metro station with Terminal 1 of Kempegowda International Airport under Blue Line of Namma Metro

General information
- Location: Gangamuthanahalli, Karnataka 560300
- Coordinates: 13.19809°N 77.71245°E
- System: Namma Metro station
- Owner: Bangalore Metro Rail Corporation Ltd (BMRCL)
- Operator: Namma Metro
- Line: Blue Line
- Platforms: Island platform (TBC); Platform-1 → Hebbala * Platform-2 → Train Terminates Here; Platform Numbers (TBC) * (Further extension to Krishnarajapura / Central Silk Board in the future)
- Tracks: 2 (TBC)
- Connections: Kempegowda International Airport; KIAL Bus Terminus; KIA Halt

Construction
- Structure type: Underground, Double track
- Platform levels: 2 (TBC)
- Parking: (TBC)
- Accessible: (TBC)

Other information
- Status: Under Construction
- Station code: (TBC)

History
- Opening: December 2028; 2 years' time (TBC)
- Electrified: 750 V DC third rail (TBC)

Services
Preceding station	Namma Metro	Following station
Airport City towards Hebbala	Blue Line (Operational around December 2027)	Terminus
Airport City towards Krishnarajapura or Central Silk Board	Blue Line (Operational around December 2028)	Terminus
Route map
Location

KIAL Terminals is an upcoming underground eastern terminal metro station on the East-West corridor of the Blue Line of Namma Metro in Bangalore, India. This will be an important metro station which will serve the passengers who would be flying to different destinations across the globe.

Around this metro station, holds the main Kempegowda International Airport, along with the KIAL Bus Terminus which would commute passengers and the general public towards the city, Hebbal and important areas like Yelahanka, Krishnarajapuram, Marathahalli and towards Mysore or Madikeri or Kundapura via KSRTC flybus services. This metro station is slated to be operational around December 2027.

== History ==
On November 17 2020, the Bangalore Metro Rail Corporation Limited (BMRCL) invited bids for the construction of the KIAL Terminals metro station, part of the 15.011 km Reach 2B – Package 3 (Bagalur Cross - KIAL Terminals) of the 37.692 km Blue Line of Namma Metro. On September 14 2021, Nagarjuna Construction Company Ltd. (NCC Ltd.) was chosen as the lowest bidder for this segment, with their proposal closely matching the initial cost estimates. As a result, the contract was awarded to the company, which led to the beginning of the construction works of this metro station as per the agreed terms.

== Station layout ==
=== Station layout (TBC) ===
G	Street level	Exit/Entrance
M	Mezzanine	Fare control, station agent, Ticket/token, shops
P	Platform 1 Eastbound	Towards → Train Terminates Here
P	Island platform | Doors will open on the right
P	Platform 2 Westbound	Towards ← Hebbala ** Next Station: Airport City
L2	Note:	** To be further extended to Krishnarajapura / Central Silk Board in the future

== See also ==
- Bangalore
- Kempegowda International Airport
- List of Namma Metro stations
- Transport in Karnataka
- List of metro systems
- List of rapid transit systems in India
