= Central Silk Board metro station =

Namma Metro's Yellow Line and upcoming Blue Line interchange metro station

Central Silk Board
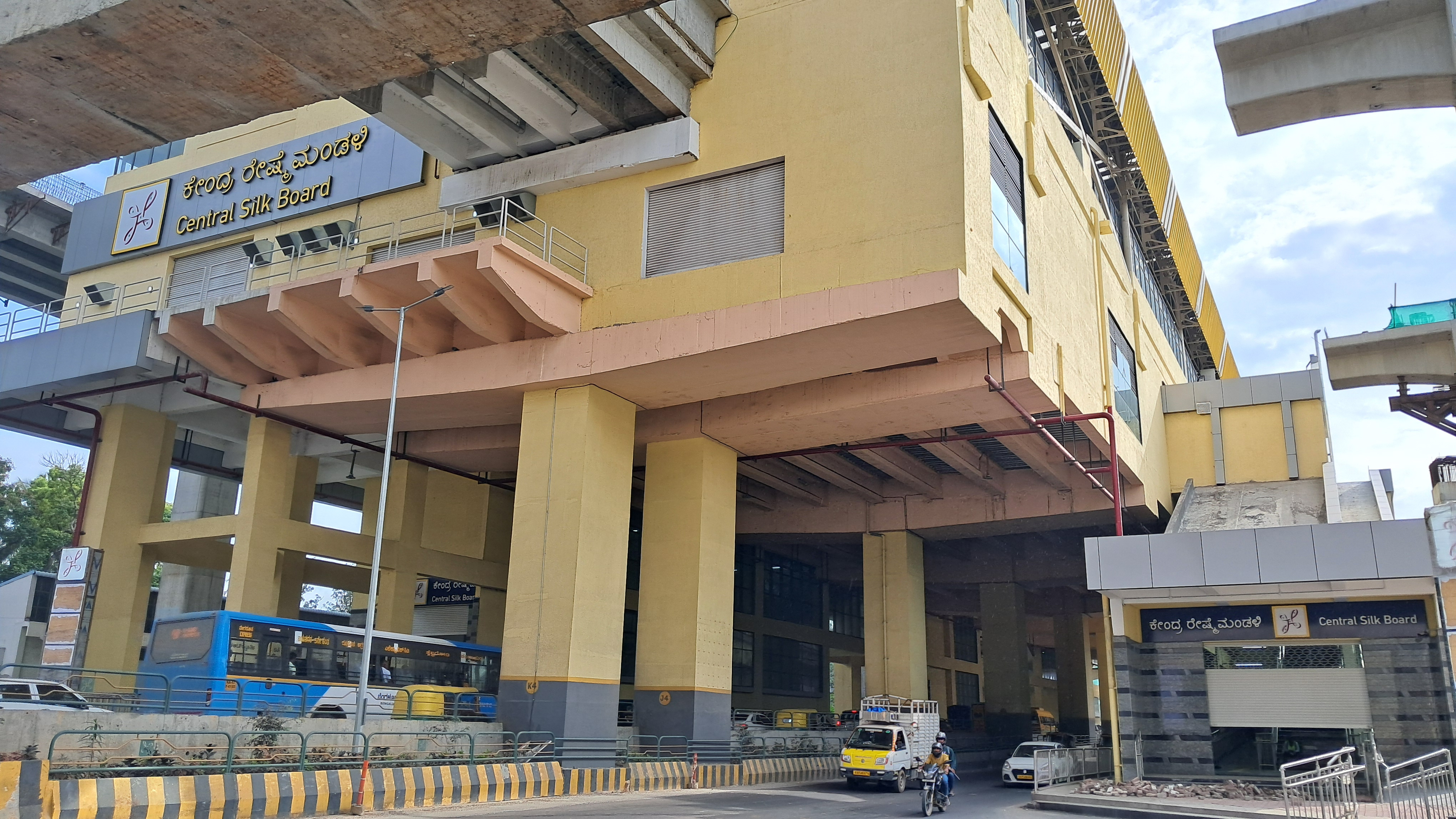
- This metro station under Yellow Line as of July 2025

General information
- Location: Outer Ring Rd, Central Silk Board Colony, Stage 2, BTM Layout, Bengaluru, Karnataka 560068
- Coordinates: 12.91652°N 77.62056°E
- System: Namma Metro station
- Owner: Bangalore Metro Rail Corporation Ltd (BMRCL)
- Operator: Namma Metro
- Line: Yellow Line Blue Line
- Platforms: Side platform Platform-1 → Rashtreeya Vidyalaya Road; Platform-2 → Delta Electronics Bommasandra; Side platform (TBC); Platform-3 - Train Terminates Here; Platform-4 - Krishnarajapura or KIAL Terminals; Platform numbers (TBC)
- Tracks: 4 (2 Operational under Yellow Line + 2 U/C under Blue Line)

Construction
- Structure type: Elevated, double track
- Platform levels: 3
- Parking: Two-Wheeler Parking only
- Accessible: Yes
- Architect: HCC - URC Construction JV; AFCONS Ltd.

Other information
- Status: Operational and Staffed; Under construction
- Station code: SBJT

History
- Opened: 10 August 2025; 15 months ago
- Opening: December 2027; 12 months' time (TBA)
- Electrified: 750 V DC third rail

Services
Preceding station	Namma Metro	Following station
BTM Layout towards Rashtreeya Vidyalaya Road	Yellow Line	Bommanahalli towards Delta Electronics Bommasandra
Terminus	Blue Line (Future Service)	HSR Layout towards Krishnarajapura or KIAL Terminals
Route map
Location

Central Silk Board is an elevated interchange metro station on the north-south corridor of the Yellow Line and the upcoming Blue Line of Namma Metro in Bengaluru, India. This metro station serves the Central Silk Board area.

== History ==
=== Yellow Line ===
In December 2016, the Bangalore Metro Rail Corporation Limited (BMRCL) issued a call for bids to construct the Central Silk Board metro station along the 6.340 km Reach 5 – Package 3 section (Central Silk Board - Rashtreeya Vidyalaya Road) of the 18.825 km Yellow Line of Namma Metro. On 16 May 2017, HCC-URC Cementation JV was selected as the lowest bidder for this stretch, with their bid closely aligning with the original cost estimates. Consequently, the contract was successfully awarded to the company, which then commenced construction of the metro station in accordance with the agreements.

The Yellow Line began operations from 10 August 2025 and has been officially inaugurated by Prime Minister Narendra Modi, with four trainsets which are ready for operations after arriving from Titagarh Rail Systems in Kolkata. The opening was delayed from May 2025 as previously announced by the Namma Metro Managing Director, Maheshwar Rao.

==== Gallery ====
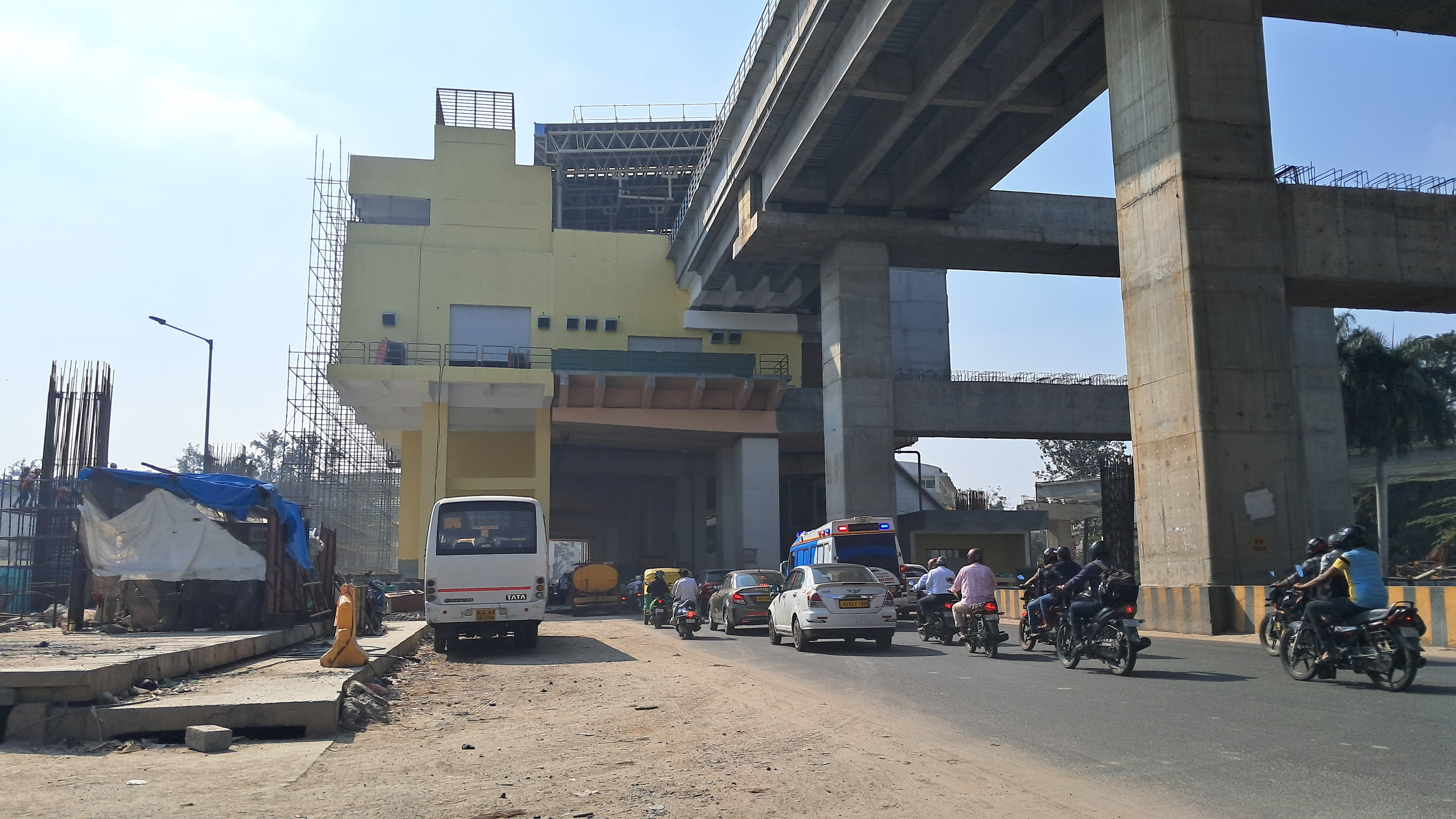
Station under construction in December 2023

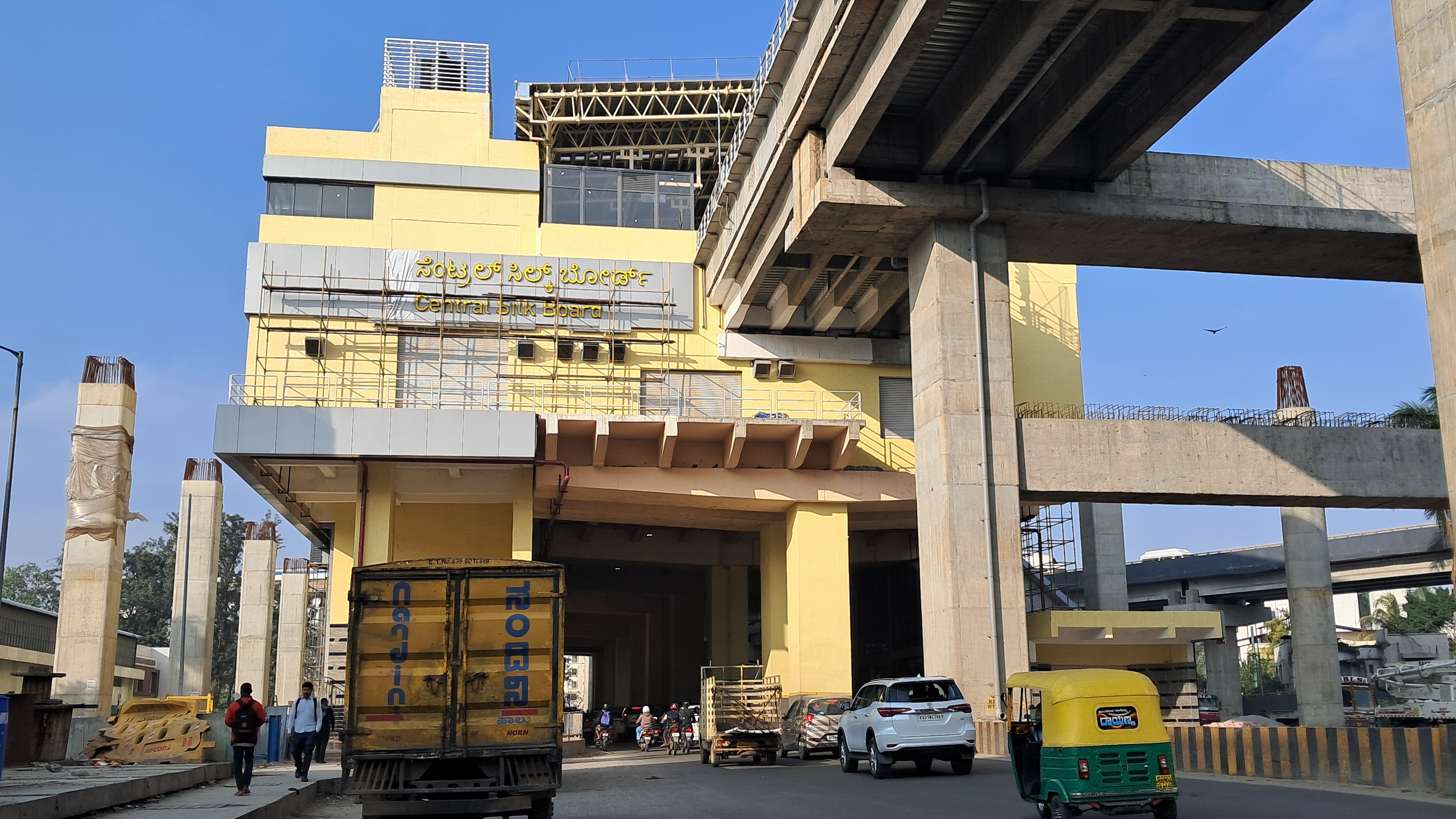
Station signage being installed in November 2024

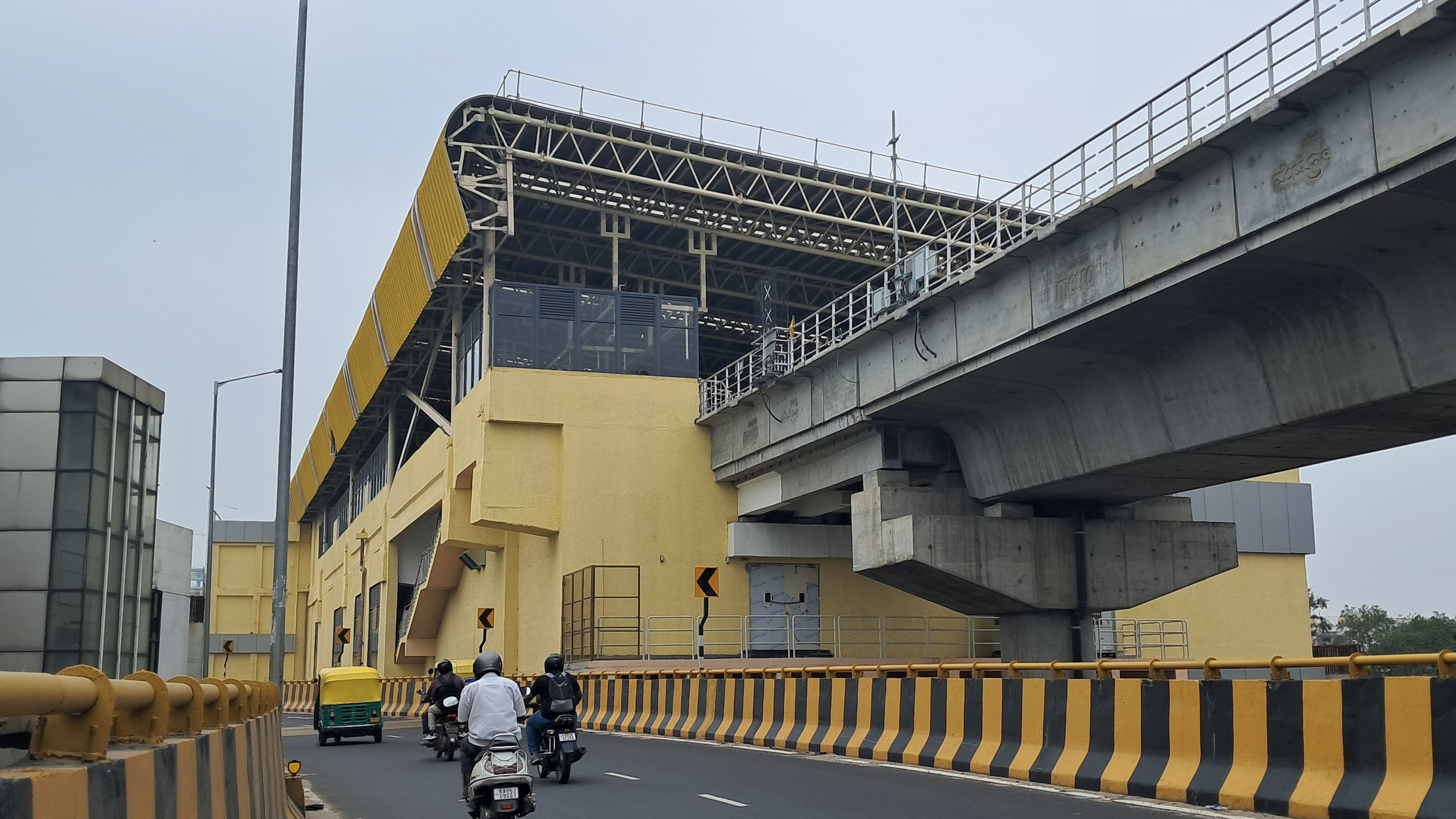
Station building seen from Ragigudda - Silk Board Flyover in November 2024

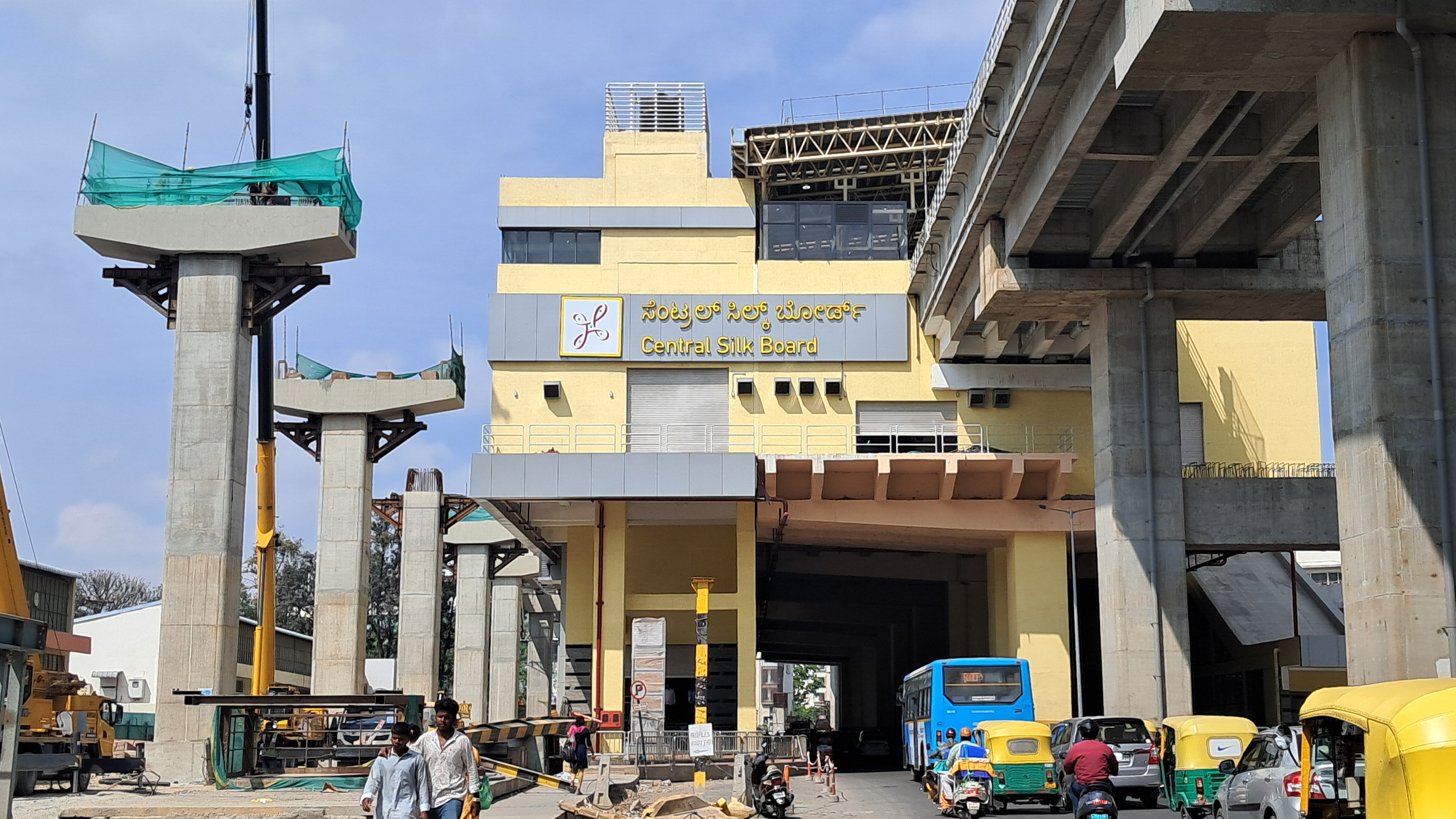
Final stages of construction in March 2025

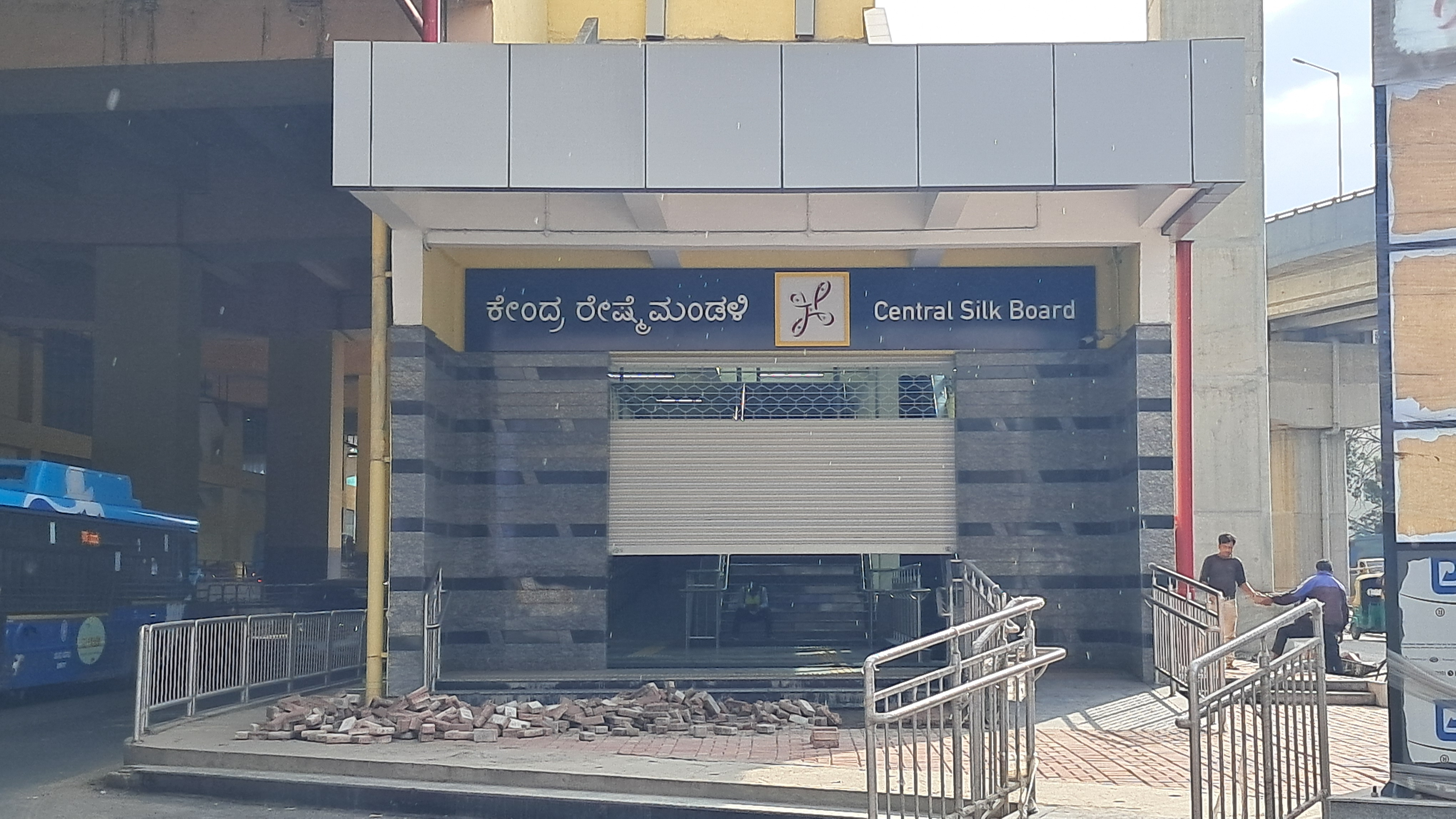
Station Entrance as of July 2025 entering from Central Silk Board heading towards HSR Layout

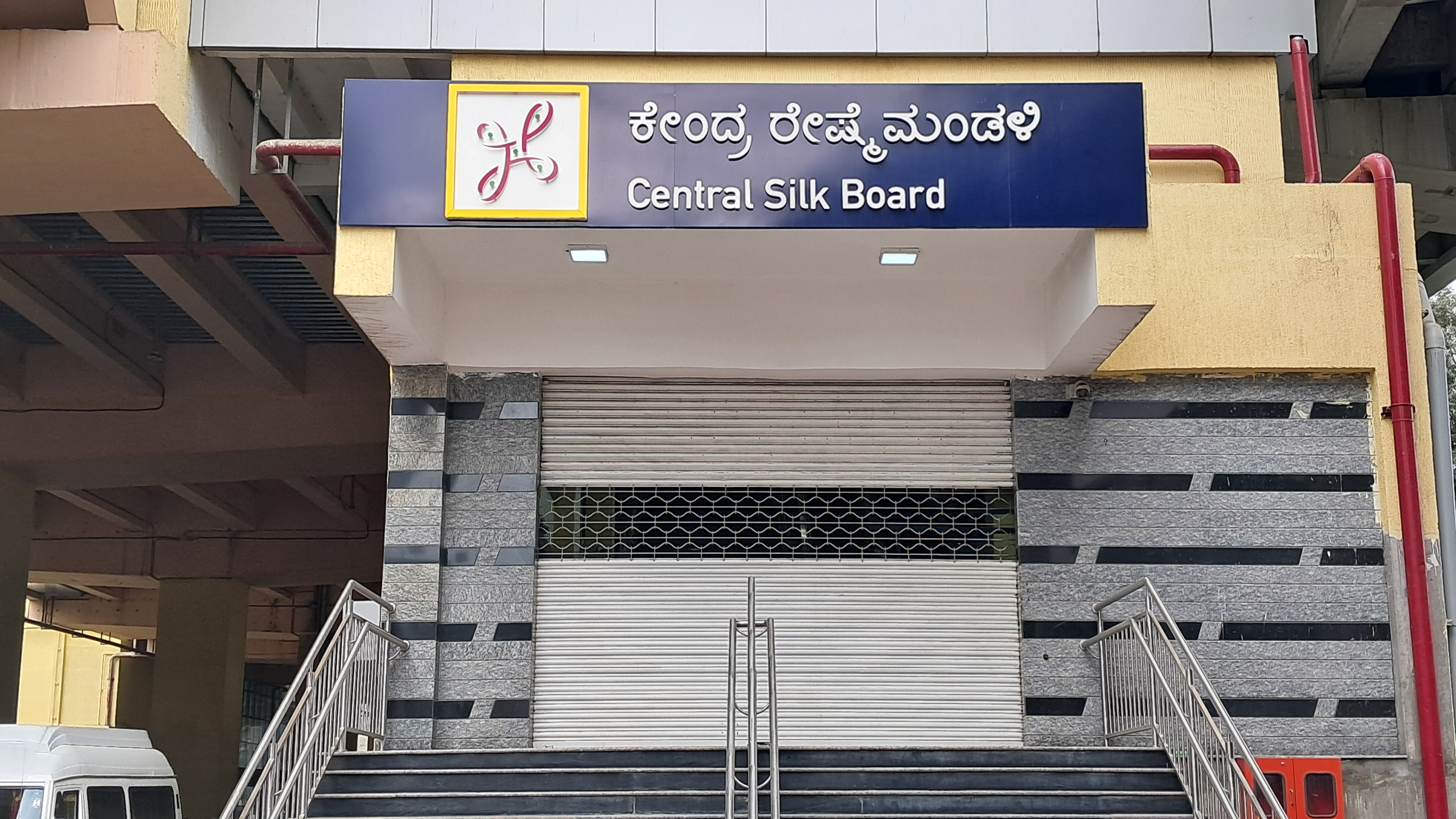
Station Entrance as of July 2025 entering from Central Silk Board heading towards Banashankari

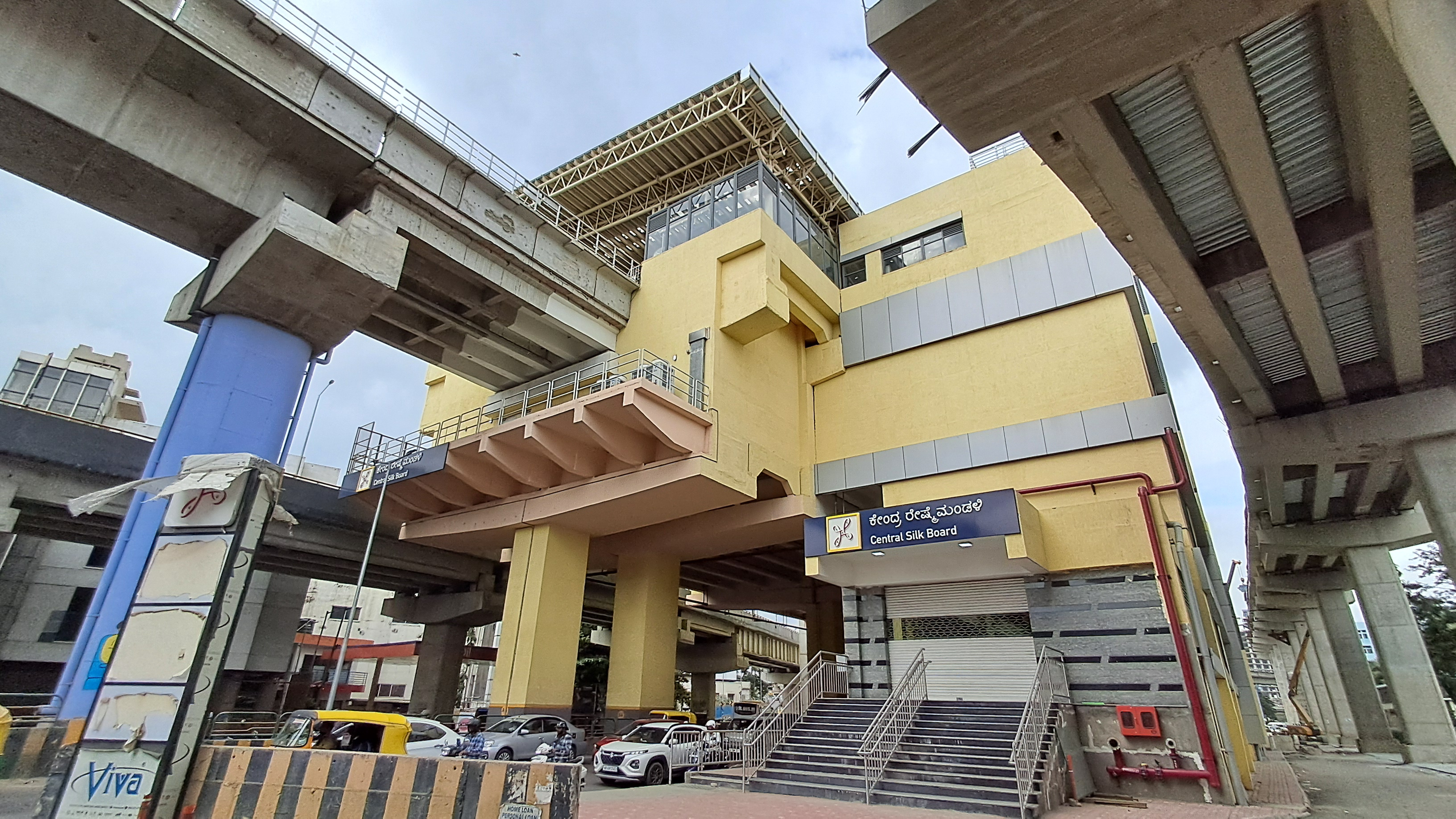
Fully constructed Central Silk Board metro station in July 2025

=== Blue Line ===
In December 2019, the Bangalore Metro Rail Corporation Limited (BMRCL) invited bids for the construction of the Central Silk Board metro station, part of the 9.859 km Phase 2A – Package 1 section (Central Silk Board - Kodibeesanahalli) of the 18.236 km Blue Line of Namma Metro. On 13 October 2020, Afcons Infrastructure was chosen as the lowest bidder for this segment, with their proposal closely matching the initial cost estimates. As a result, the contract was awarded to the company, which led to the beginning of the construction works of this metro station as per the agreed terms.

The elevated section of Blue Line covering a distance of 58.2 km from Central Silk Board to KIAL Terminals via Krishnarajapura is expected to be operational by December 2027.

== Station layout ==
Yellow Line

G	Street level	Exit/entrance
L1	Mezzanine	Fare control, station agent, Metro Card vending machines, crossover
L2	Side platform | Doors will open on the left
L2	Platform 2 Eastbound	Towards → Delta Electronics Bommasandra; Next station: Bommanahalli
L2	Platform 1 Westbound	Towards ← Rashtreeya Vidyalaya Road; Next station: BTM Layout
L2	Side platform | Doors will open on the left
L2

Blue Line (TBC)

G	Street level	Exit/Entrance
L1	Mezzanine	Fare control, station agent, Metro Card vending machines, crossover
L2	Side platform | Doors will open on the left
L2	Platform # Eastbound	Towards → Krishnarajapura ** Next station: HSR Layout
L2	Platform # Westbound	Towards ← Train Terminates Here
L2	Side platform | Doors will open on the left
L2	Note:	** To be further extended to KIAL Terminals in future

== Entry/Exits ==
There are three entry/exit points – A, B and C. Commuters can use either of the points for their travel.

- Entry/Exit point A: Towards Central Silk Board side
- Entry/Exit point B: Towards Textile Testing Lab side
- Entry/Exit point C: Towards Central Silk Board Colony side
  - Wheelchair accessibility has been provided for both entry/exit points A, B and C.

== See also ==
- Bengaluru
- List of Namma Metro stations
- Transport in Karnataka
- List of metro systems
- List of rapid transit systems in India
