= Krishnarajapura metro station =

Namma Metro's Purple & Blue Line interchange station

Krishnarajapura
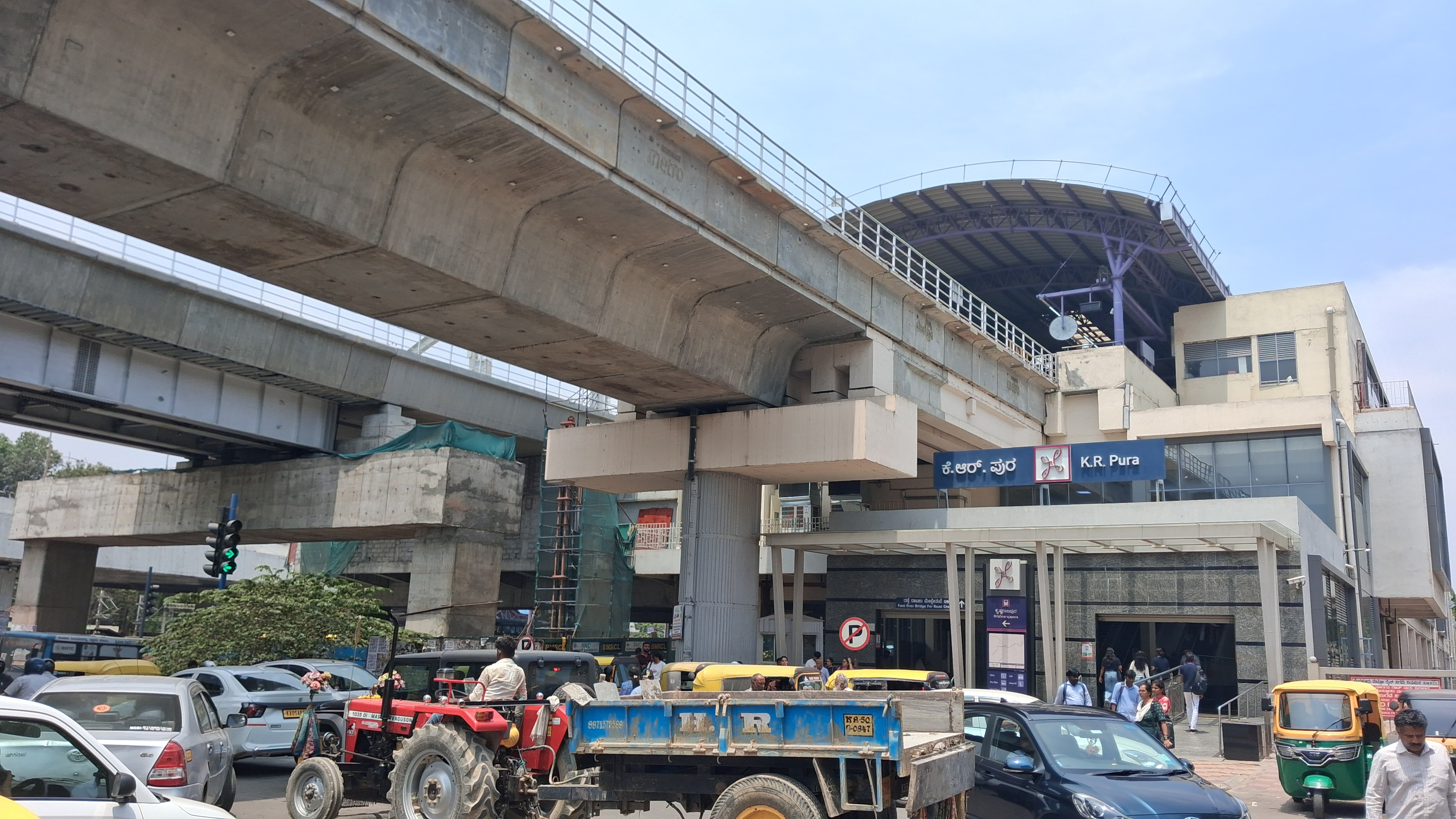
- Front Entrance of this metro station under Namma Metro's Purple Line and upcoming Blue Line as of April 2026

General information
- Other names: KR Pura
- Location: NH 44, Chinappa Colony, Mahadevapura, Bengaluru, Karnataka 560016
- Coordinates: 13°0′0″N 77°40′39″E
- System: Namma Metro station
- Owner: Bangalore Metro Rail Corporation Ltd (BMRCL)
- Operator: Namma Metro
- Line: Purple Line Blue Line
- Platforms: Side platform Platform-1 → Whitefield (Kadugodi); Platform-2 → Challaghatta; Side platform (TBC); Platform-3 → Central Silk Board; Platform-4 → KIAL Terminals
- Tracks: 2
- Connections: Krishnarajapuram

Construction
- Structure type: Elevated, Double track
- Platform levels: 2 (Operational under Purple Line); 2 (Under Construction under Blue Line)
- Parking: Two & Four Wheelers
- Accessible: Yes
- Architect: ITD - ITD Cementation India JV; Shankaranarayana Constructions (SNC)

Other information
- Status: Staffed
- Station code: KRAM

History
- Opened: 26 March 2023; 3 years ago
- Opening: December 2026; 13 days' time (TBC)
- Electrified: 750 V DC third rail

Services
Preceding station	Namma Metro	Following station
Singayyanapalya towards Whitefield (Kadugodi)	Purple Line	Benniganahalli towards Challaghatta
Sarasvathi Nagara towards Central Silk Board	Blue Line (Future service)	Kasturinagara towards KIAL Terminals
Route map
Location

Krishnarajapura (abbreviated as K.R. Pura) is an important elevated metro station on the East-West corridor of the Purple Line as well as the South-North corridor of the upcoming Blue Line of Namma Metro in Bengaluru, India. This will be an upcoming interchange metro station after Nadaprabhu Kempegowda Stn., Majestic having interchange with Purple and Green Lines. Around this station, holds the main KR Puram Railway station followed by some locations like KR Pura Hanging Bridge leading towards Hoskote, Tin Factory, ITI General Hospital and many more. This station under Blue Line is planned to be operational December 2026 instead of June 2026.

The Whitefield - Krishnarajapura trial runs were successfully conducted (under Purple Line) from 25 October for a month. This metro station (under Purple Line) was inaugurated on 25 March 2023 by Prime Minister Narendra Modi and was commenced to the public on 26 March 2023.

== History ==
=== Blue Line ===
In December 2019, the Bangalore Metro Rail Corporation Limited (BMRCL) invited bids for the construction of the metro station, part of the 8.377 km Reach 2A – Package 2 (Kodibeesanahalli - Krishnarajapura) of the 18.236 km Blue Line of Namma Metro. On 13 October 2020, Shankaranarayana Constructions (SNC) was chosen as the lowest bidder for this segment, with their proposal closely matching the initial cost estimates. As a result, the contract was awarded to the company, which led to the beginning of the construction works of this metro station as per the agreed terms.

== Station layout ==
G	Street level	Exit/Entrance
L1	Mezzanine	Fare control, station agent, Metro Card vending machines, crossover
L2	Side platform | Doors will open on the left
L2	Platform # Eastbound	Towards → Central Silk Board; Next Station: Sarasvathi Nagara
L2	Platform # Westbound	Towards ← Train Terminates Here**; Next Station: Kasturinagara
L2	Island platform | P1 & P# doors will open on the left Blue Line Station Layout & Platform Numbers - (TBC)
L2	Platform 1 Eastbound	Towards → Whitefield (Kadugodi); Next Station: Singayyanapalya
L2	Platform 2 Westbound	Towards ← Challaghatta; Next Station: Benniganahalli
L2	Side platform | Doors will open on the left
L2	Note:	** To be further extended to KIAL Terminals in future

== Gallery ==
An Image of this metro station pictures are shown below:-

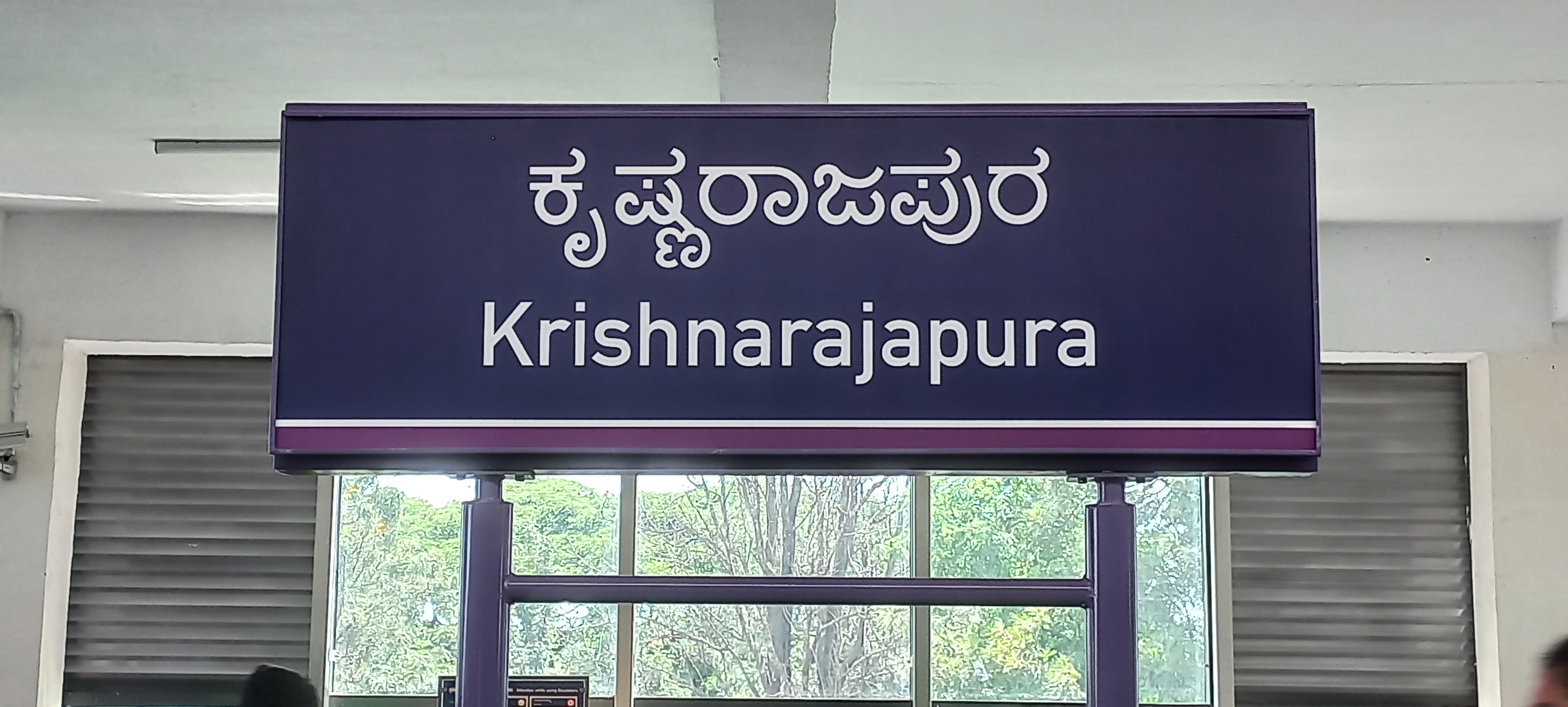
Station Board of this metro station under Purple Line as of September 2023

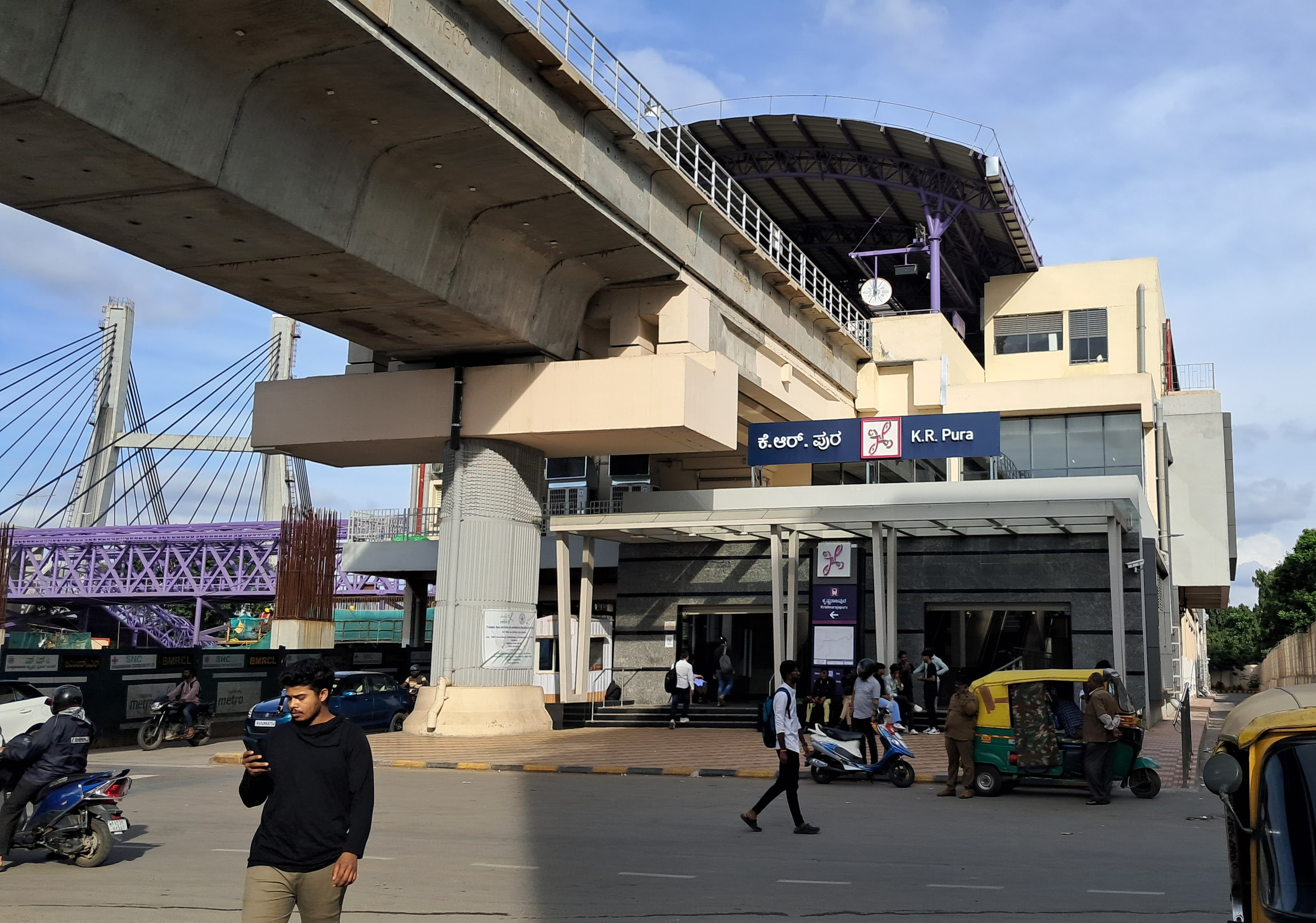
Front Entrance of this metro station as of November 2023

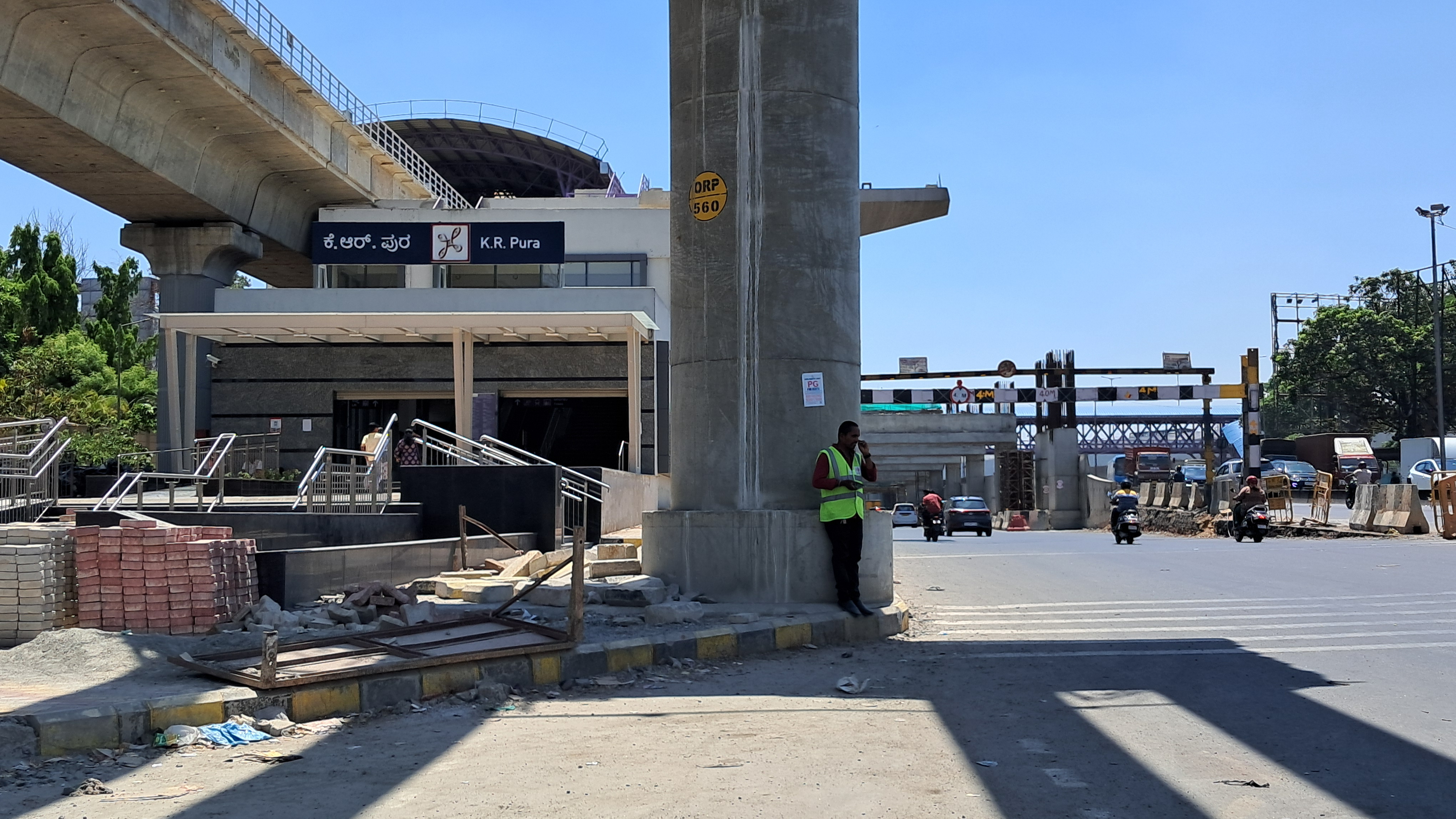
LS:- Operational metro station under Purple Line. RS:- Under construction of this metro station under Phase 2A of Blue Line of Namma Metro as of April 2024

Architectural Finishing Works in progress for this metro as of October 2026

== Connections ==
This metro station is connected with Krishnarajapuram of Indian Railways network via a foot overbridge.

== Entry/Exit ==
There are 2 Entry/Exit points - A and B. Commuters can use either of the points for their travel.

- Entry/Exit point A - Towards KR Pura Railway Station side
- Entry/Exit point B - Towards Whitefield Main Road side

== See also ==
- Krishnarajapuram
- Bengaluru
- List of Namma Metro stations
- Transport in Karnataka
- List of metro systems
- List of rapid transit systems in India
- Bangalore Metropolitan Transport Corporation
