= Horamavu metro station =

Upcoming Namma Metro station under Blue Line

Horamavu
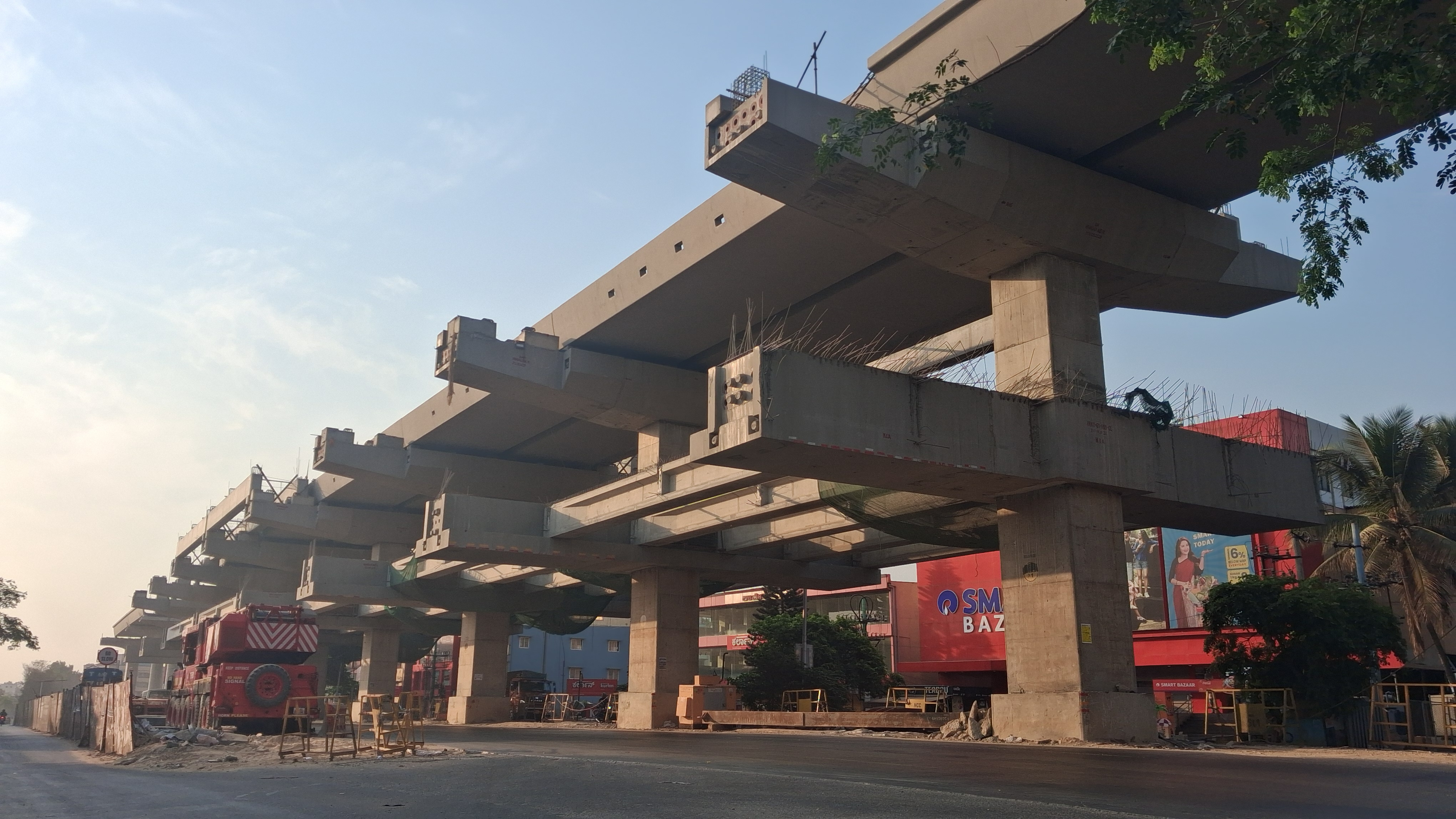
- Under Construction of this metro station under Phase 2B of Namma Metro's Blue Line as of April 2026

General information
- Location: Annaiah Reddy Layout, Banaswadi, Bengaluru, Karnataka 560043
- Coordinates: 13.01702°N 77.66035°E
- System: Namma Metro station
- Owner: Bangalore Metro Rail Corporation Ltd (BMRCL)
- Operator: Namma Metro
- Line: Blue Line
- Platforms: Side platform (TBC); Platform-1 → Krishnarajapura / Central Silk Board; Platform-2 → KIAL Terminals; Platform Numbers (TBC)
- Tracks: 2 (TBC)
- Connections: Vijaya Bank Colony Bus Stop

Construction
- Structure type: Elevated, Double track
- Platform levels: 2 (TBC)
- Parking: (TBC)
- Accessible: (TBC)

Other information
- Status: Under Construction
- Station code: (TBC)

History
- Opening: December 2027; 15 months' time (TBC)
- Electrified: (TBC)

Services
Preceding station	Namma Metro	Following station
Kasturinagara towards Krishnarajapura or Central Silk Board	Blue Line (Future Service)	HRBR Layout towards KIAL Terminals
Route map
Location

Horamavu metro station is an upcoming elevated metro station on the North-South corridor of the Blue Line of Namma Metro in Bangalore, India. Around this metro stations holds the main Horamavu suburban area which is adjacent to Banaswadi, Kalkere and Ramamurthy Nagar, followed by some prime furniture locations like Royaloak Furnitures, Cauvery Furnitures, Damro Furnitures and the famous Horamavu Bridge leading towards Kalkere and Dodda Banaswadi areas. This metro station is expected to open around December 2027.

== History ==
On November 17 2020, the Bangalore Metro Rail Corporation Limited (BMRCL) invited bids for the construction of the Horamavu metro station, part of the 11 km Reach 2B – Package 1 (Krishnarajapura - Kempapura) of the 37.692 km Blue Line of Namma Metro. On September 14 2021, Nagarjuna Construction Company Ltd. (NCC Ltd.) was chosen as the lowest bidder for this segment, with their proposal closely matching the initial cost estimates. As a result, the contract was awarded to the company, which led to the beginning of the construction works of this metro station as per the agreed terms.

== Station layout ==
Station Layout - To Be Confirmed

G	Street level	Exit/Entrance
L1	Mezzanine	Fare control, station agent, Metro Card vending machines, crossover
L2	Side platform | Doors will open on the left
L2	Platform # Eastbound	Towards → Krishnarajapura / Central Silk Board; Next Station: Kasturi Nagar
L2	Platform # Westbound	Towards ← Hebbala / KIAL Terminals; Next Station: HRBR Layout
L2	Side platform | Doors will open on the left
L2

== See also ==
- Bangalore
- List of Namma Metro stations
- Transport in Karnataka
- List of metro systems
- List of rapid transit systems in India
- Bangalore Metropolitan Transport Corporation
