= Kalyan Nagar metro station =

Upcoming Namma Metro station under Blue Line

Kalyan Nagar
- Under Construction of this metro station under Phase 2B of Namma Metro's Blue Line as of October 2026

General information
- Location: 2nd A Cross Rd, HRBR Layout 2nd Block, East of NGEF Layout, Dooravani Nagar, Bengaluru, Karnataka 560043
- Coordinates: 13.02626°N 77.63780°E
- System: Namma Metro station
- Owner: Bangalore Metro Rail Corporation Ltd (BMRCL)
- Operator: Namma Metro
- Line: Blue Line
- Platforms: Side platform (TBC); Platform-1 → Krishnarajapura / Central Silk Board; Platform-2 → KIAL Terminals; Platform Numbers (TBC)
- Tracks: 2 (TBC)
- Connections: Kalyan Nagar BMTC Bus Depot and Bus Stop

Construction
- Structure type: Elevated, Double track
- Platform levels: 2 (TBC)
- Parking: (TBC)
- Accessible: (TBC)

Other information
- Status: Under Construction - Casting of Platform Slabs
- Station code: KLN (TBC)

History
- Opening: December 2027; 13 months' time (TBC)
- Electrified: (TBC)

Services
| Preceding station | Namma Metro | Following station |
|---|---|---|
| HRBR Layout towards Krishnarajapura or Central Silk Board | Blue Line (Future Service) | HBR Layout towards KIAL Terminals |
Route map
Location

Kalyan Nagar is an upcoming elevated metro station on the North-South corridor of the Blue Line of Namma Metro in Bangalore, India. Around this metro station holds the main Kalyan Nagar BMTC Bus Depot cum Bus Stop followed by many prime Jewellery retail stores like Lalitha Jewellery, Tanishq, Kalyan Jewellers, Jos Alukkas and neighbouring Kammanahalli, Hennur and Chelekkere suburban areas. This metro station was slated to become operational around June 2026.

== History ==
On November 17 2020, the Bangalore Metro Rail Corporation Limited (BMRCL) invited bids for the construction of the Kalyan Nagar metro station, part of the 11 km Reach 2B – Package 1 (Krishnarajapura - Kempapura) of the 37.692 km Blue Line of Namma Metro. On September 14 2021, Nagarjuna Construction Company Ltd. (NCC Ltd.) was chosen as the lowest bidder for this segment, with their proposal closely matching the initial cost estimates. As a result, the contract was awarded to the company, which led to the beginning of the construction works of this metro station as per the agreed terms.

== Station layout ==
Station Layout - To Be Confirmed

| G | Street level | Exit/Entrance |
| L1 | Mezzanine | Fare control, station agent, Metro Card vending machines, crossover |
| L2 | Side platform | Doors will open on the left |
| L2 | Platform # Eastbound | Towards → Krishnarajapura / Central Silk Board; Next Station: HRBR Layout |
| L2 | Platform # Westbound | Towards ← Hebbala / KIAL Terminals; Next Station: HBR Layout |
| L2 | Side platform | Doors will open on the left |
| L2 |

== See also ==
- Bangalore
- List of Namma Metro stations
- Transport in Karnataka
- List of metro systems
- List of rapid transit systems in India
- Bangalore Metropolitan Transport Corporation
