= HRBR Layout metro station =

Upcoming Namma Metro station under Blue Line

HRBR Layout
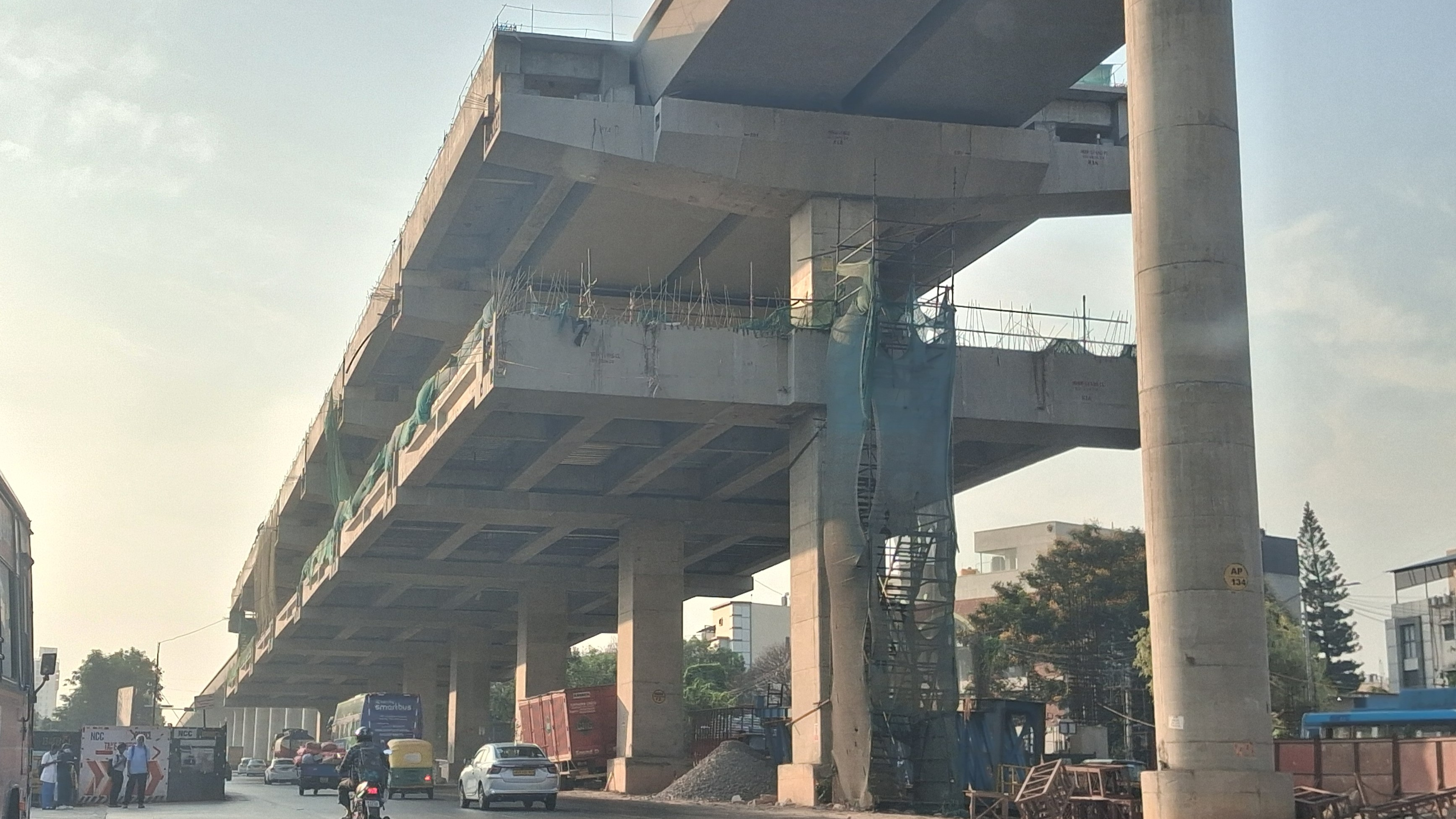
- Under Construction of this metro station under Phase 2B of Namma Metro's Blue Line as of April 2026

General information
- Location: NH 44, Babusabpalya, Kalyan Nagar, Bengaluru, Karnataka 560043
- Coordinates: 13.02254°N 77.64739°E
- System: Namma Metro station
- Owner: Bangalore Metro Rail Corporation Ltd (BMRCL)
- Operator: Namma Metro
- Line: Blue Line
- Platforms: Side platform (TBC); Platform-1 → Krishnarajapura / Central Silk Board; Platform-2 → KIAL Terminals; Platform Numbers (TBC)
- Tracks: 2 (TBC)
- Connections: Babusapalya Bus Stop

Construction
- Structure type: Elevated, Double track
- Platform levels: 2 (TBC)
- Parking: (TBC)
- Accessible: (TBC)

Other information
- Status: Under Construction
- Station code: (TBC)

History
- Opening: December 2027; 13 months' time (TBC)
- Electrified: (TBC)

Services
Preceding station	Namma Metro	Following station
Horamavu towards Krishnarajapura or Central Silk Board	Blue Line (Future Service)	Kalyan Nagar towards KIAL Terminals
Route map
Location

HRBR Layout metro station is an upcoming elevated metro station on HRBR Layout area on the North-South corridor of the Blue Line of Namma Metro in Bangalore, India. Around this metro station holds the main Babusapalya Park, followed by the main Hennur Police Station, Pai Internationals (Electronics Supermarket), BESCOM(Bangalore Electric Supply Company), Karnataka Power Transmission Corporation (HRBR Branch) and Royal Enfield Bike Showroom (HRBR Branch). This metro station is slated to become operational around June 2026.

== Description ==
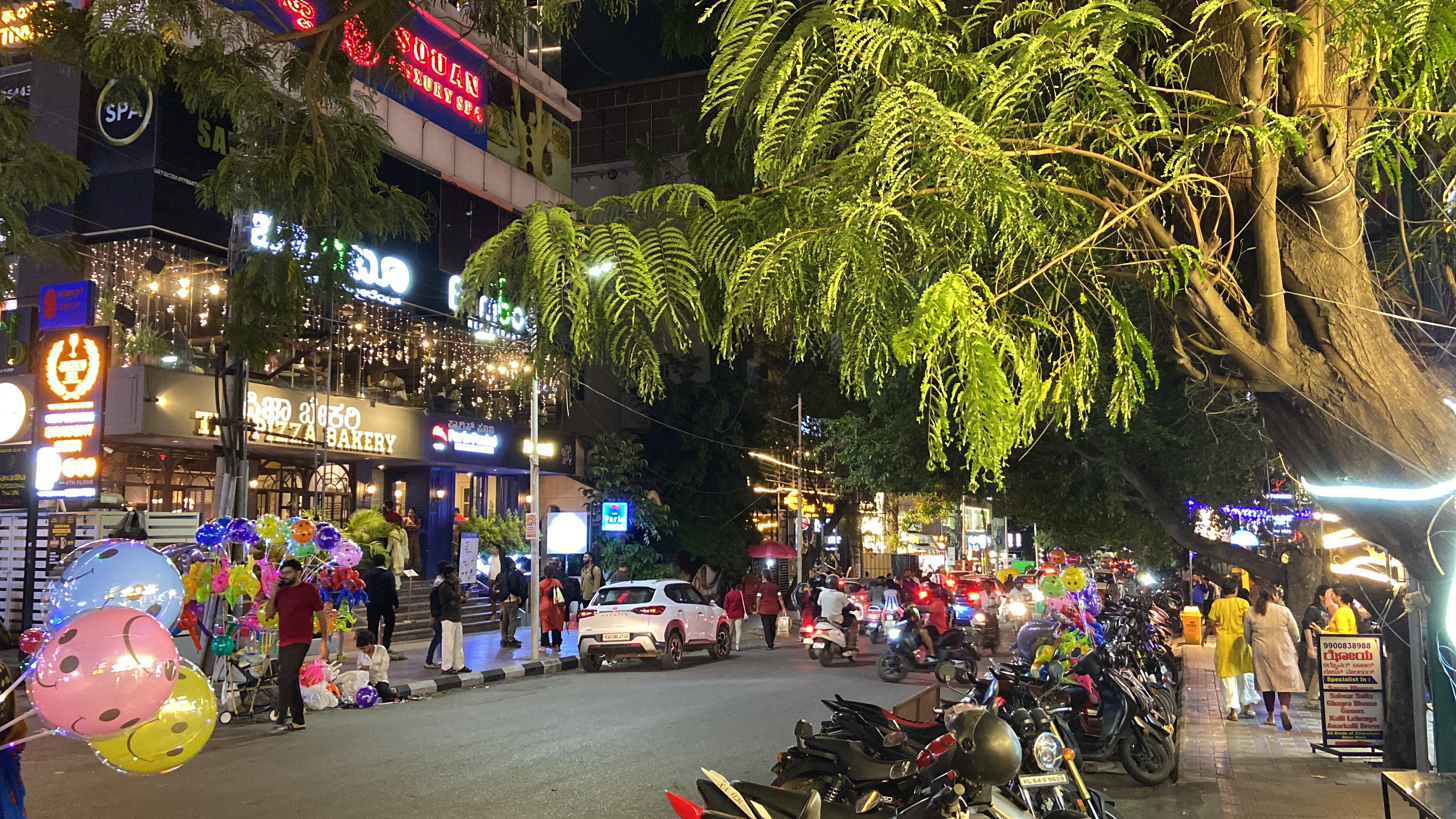
5th Main Road, HRBR Layout

HRBR Layout also known as Hennur Road Banaswadi Road Layout is a planned area in Bengaluru that was primarily developed in the year 1984-85 by the Bangalore Development Authority (BDA). The layout was formed on the dried-up Channasandra Tank. HRBR Layout is popular for nightlife and shopping in the areas of 5th Main Road, 7th Main road, CMR Main Road, 80 Feet Road and PNS Layout.

== History ==
On November 17 2020, the Bangalore Metro Rail Corporation Limited (BMRCL) invited bids for the construction of the HRBR Layout metro station, part of the 11 km Reach 2B – Package 1 (Krishnarajapura - Kempapura) of the 37.692 km Blue Line of Namma Metro. On September 14 2021, Nagarjuna Construction Company Ltd. (NCC Ltd.) was chosen as the lowest bidder for this segment, with their proposal closely matching the initial cost estimates. As a result, the contract was awarded to the company, which led to the beginning of the construction works of this metro station as per the agreed terms.

== Station layout ==
Station Layout - To Be Confirmed

G	Street level	Exit/Entrance
L1	Mezzanine	Fare control, station agent, Metro Card vending machines, crossover
L2	Side platform | Doors will open on the left
L2	Platform # Eastbound	Towards → Krishnarajapura / Central Silk Board; Next Station: Horamavu
L2	Platform # Westbound	Towards ← Hebbala / KIAL Terminals; Next Station: Kalyan Nagar
L2	Side platform | Doors will open on the left
L2

== See also ==
- Bangalore
- Kammanahalli
- List of Namma Metro stations
- Transport in Karnataka
- List of metro systems
- List of rapid transit systems in India
- Bangalore Metropolitan Transport Corporation
