= Channasandra railway station =

Railway station in Karnataka, India

Channasandra Cannasandra Channaasandra
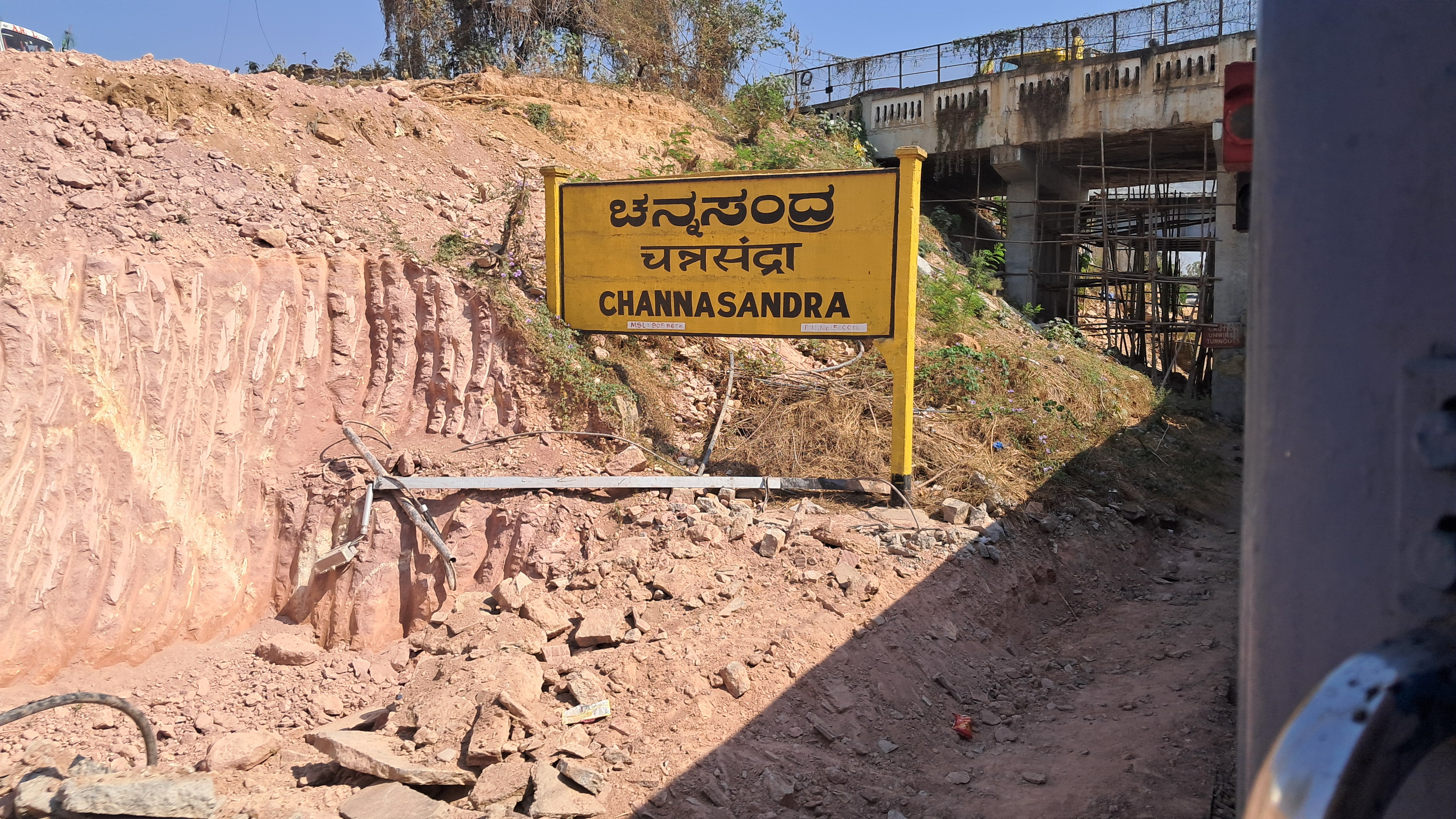

General information
- Location: Ramamurthy Nagar Main Rd, Govindapura, Dooravani Nagar, Bengaluru, Karnataka – 560016; India
- Coordinates: 13.0117141°N 77.6630162°E
- Elevation: 913 metres (2,995 ft)
- System: Indian Railways station
- Owner: Indian Railways
- Line: Chennai Central–Bangalore City line

Other information
- Status: Operational
- Station code: CSDR
- Zone(s): South Western Railway
- Division(s): Bengaluru

Services
Preceding station	Indian Railways	Following station
Thanisandra towards Yelahanka Junction	Chennai Central–Bangalore City line	Krishnarajapuram towards Chennai Central
Thanisandra towards Yelahanka Junction	Chennai Central–Bangalore City line	Baiyyappanahalli towards Bangalore City
Location
- Location within Bengaluru Location within Karnataka Location within India

Channasandra railway station (station code: CSDR) serves the rail needs of the areas of K.Channasandra, Ramamurthy Nagar, Dooravani Nagar and other nearby areas of East Bengaluru. It has 2 platforms and basic amenities to cater the needs of the passengers. The station is a part of the proposed Bangalore Suburban Railway network.

== Redevelopment ==
=== Amrit Bharat Station Scheme ===
Redevelopment work was planned at Channasandra railway station under the Amrit Bharat Station Scheme, with an investment of approximately ₹20 crore. The proposed works included remodelling the station yard, adding a third platform to the existing two, constructing a foot overbridge and improving passenger amenities. Other proposed facilities included parking, ticketing counters and food outlets.

=== Suburban rail and metro connectivity ===
Channasandra has been associated with plans for integration with the Bengaluru Suburban Railway. A suburban railway station adjacent to the existing railway station is planned. A foot overbridge to improve interchange with the Kasturinagara metro station metro station is also proposed.
