= Babusapalya =

Babusapalya Babusahebpalya
- Neighbourhood
- Location in Bengaluru, India
- Coordinates: 13.0248533°N 77.6468212°E
- Country: India
- State: Karnataka
- District: Bangalore
- Metro: Bangalore

Languages
  - Official: Kannada
- Time zone: UTC+5:30 (IST)
- Telephone code: 91-80
- Vehicle registration: KA 03, KA 53
- Lok Sabha: Bengaluru North
- Karnataka Legislative Assembly: K. R. Pura (AC 151)

Babusapalya, also known as Babusahebpalya, is a suburb in Bangalore in the Indian state of Karnataka. Babusapalya is famous for the 60 feet Lord Ganesha Statue. It is located approximately 14 kilometers from Bangalore City railway station. Babusabpalya is approximately 5 kilometers from K R Puram railway station.

== Politics ==
Babusapalya belongs to Horamavu Ward (Ward Number:25) which is the most populated of the city's 198 wards, going by Census 2011. Less than a decade ago, Horamavu's population was 28,167. The population has more than trebled, indicating the pace of growth in the city. The elected Corporator, Radhamma of INC won the BBMP 2015 elections with 24,756 with a victory margin of 8,534 votes defeating N Bharathi of BJP.

B A Basavaraj of the Indian National Congress (INC) was elected as the Member of Legislative assembly from this constituency in 2013 and 2018 Karnataka Assembly election. It is a part of the Bangalore North Lok Sabha constituency. Shobha Karandlaje of the bjp is the present MP from this Lok Sabha constituency.

== History ==
In 1940s, a business man named "Babu Saheba" settled in this village. The village is named after him.

== Places of interest ==
The 60 feet high Ganesha Statue, situated adjacent to the Outer Ring Road, is the prime landmark of Babusapalya. Other landmarks include the Logos Retreat Centre and St. Joseph's Church, St. Vincent Pallotti School, and the scenic Chelekere Lake which is in the heart of the suburb and is home to many birds and reptiles. The walking park is adjacent to the ring road.
