= Benniganahalli metro station =

Namma Metro's Purple Line metro station

Benniganahalli
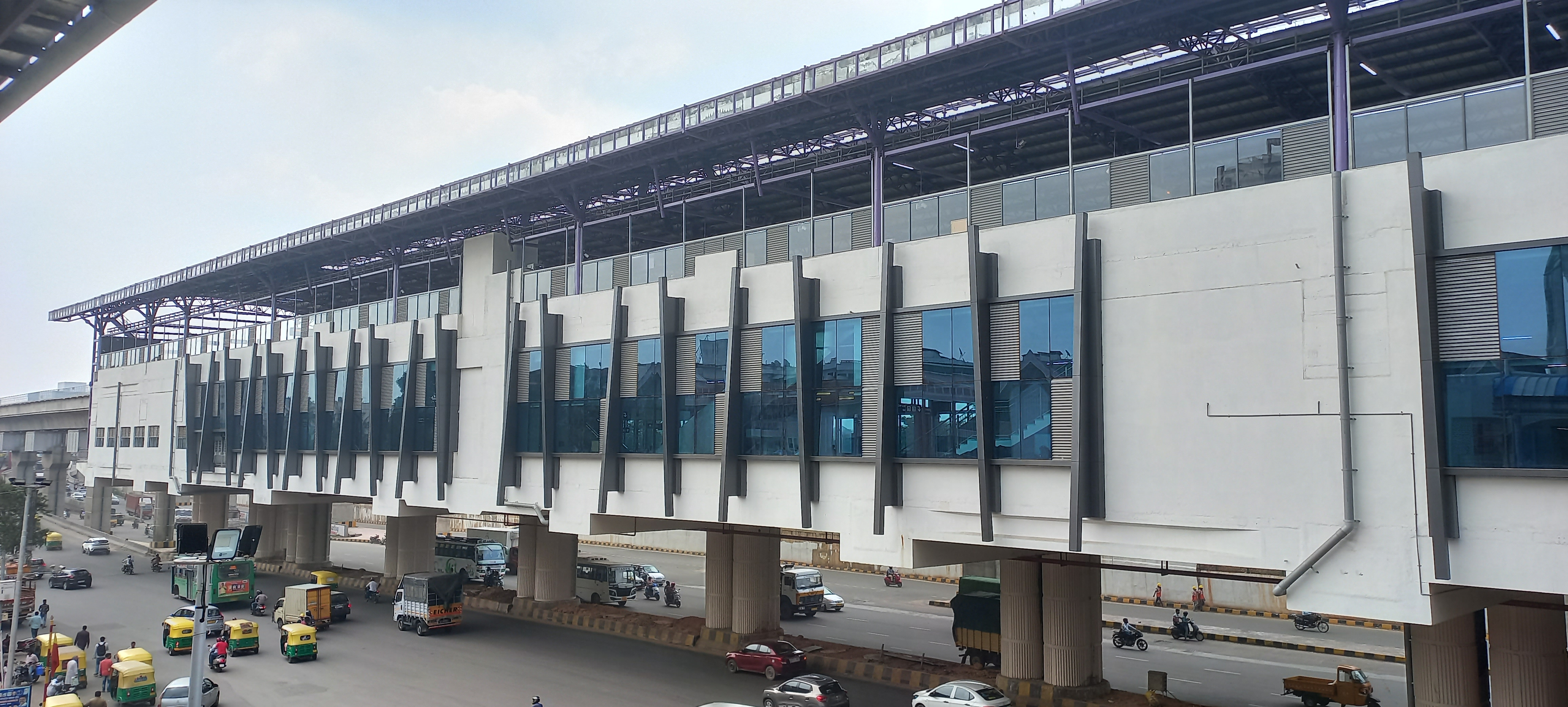
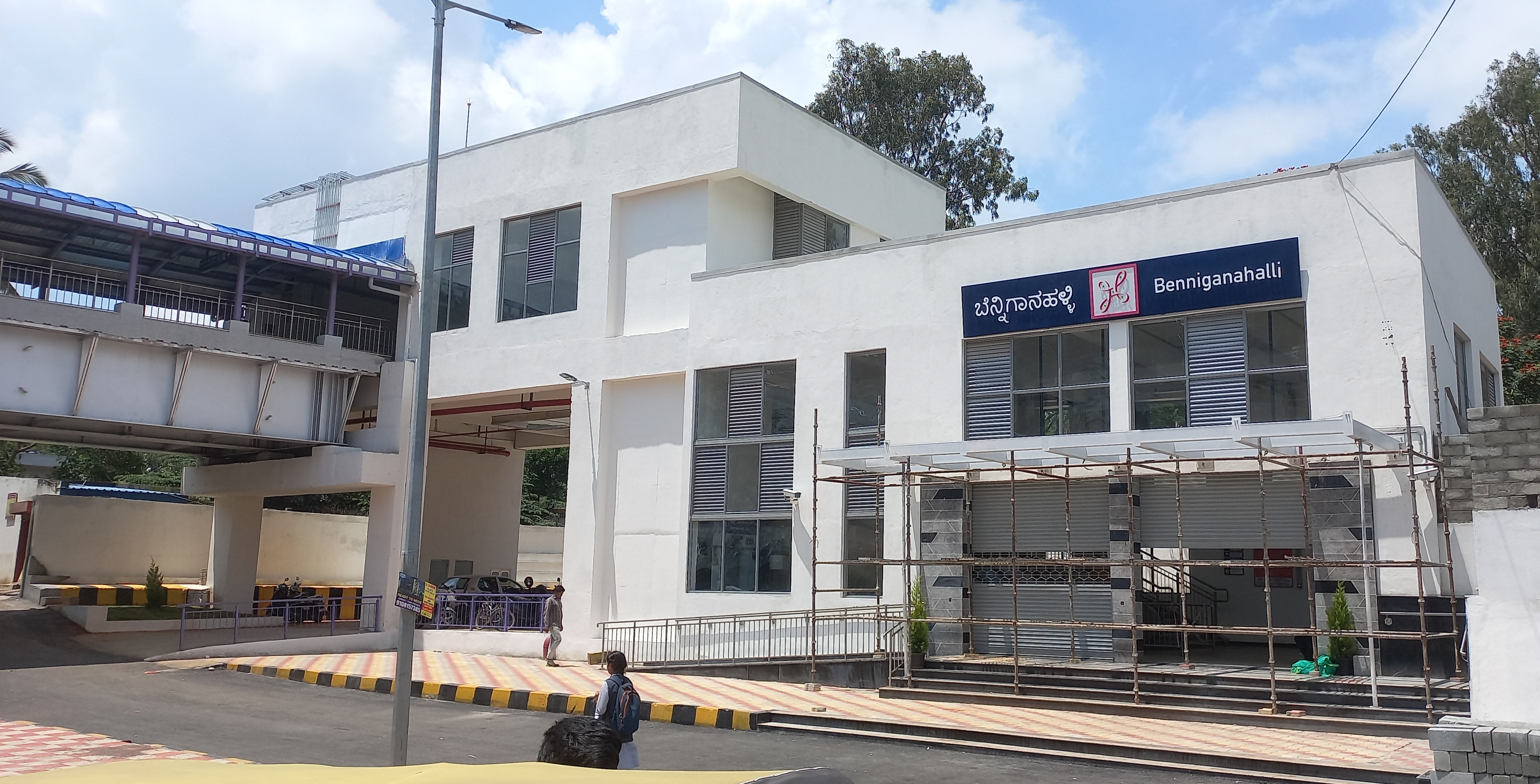
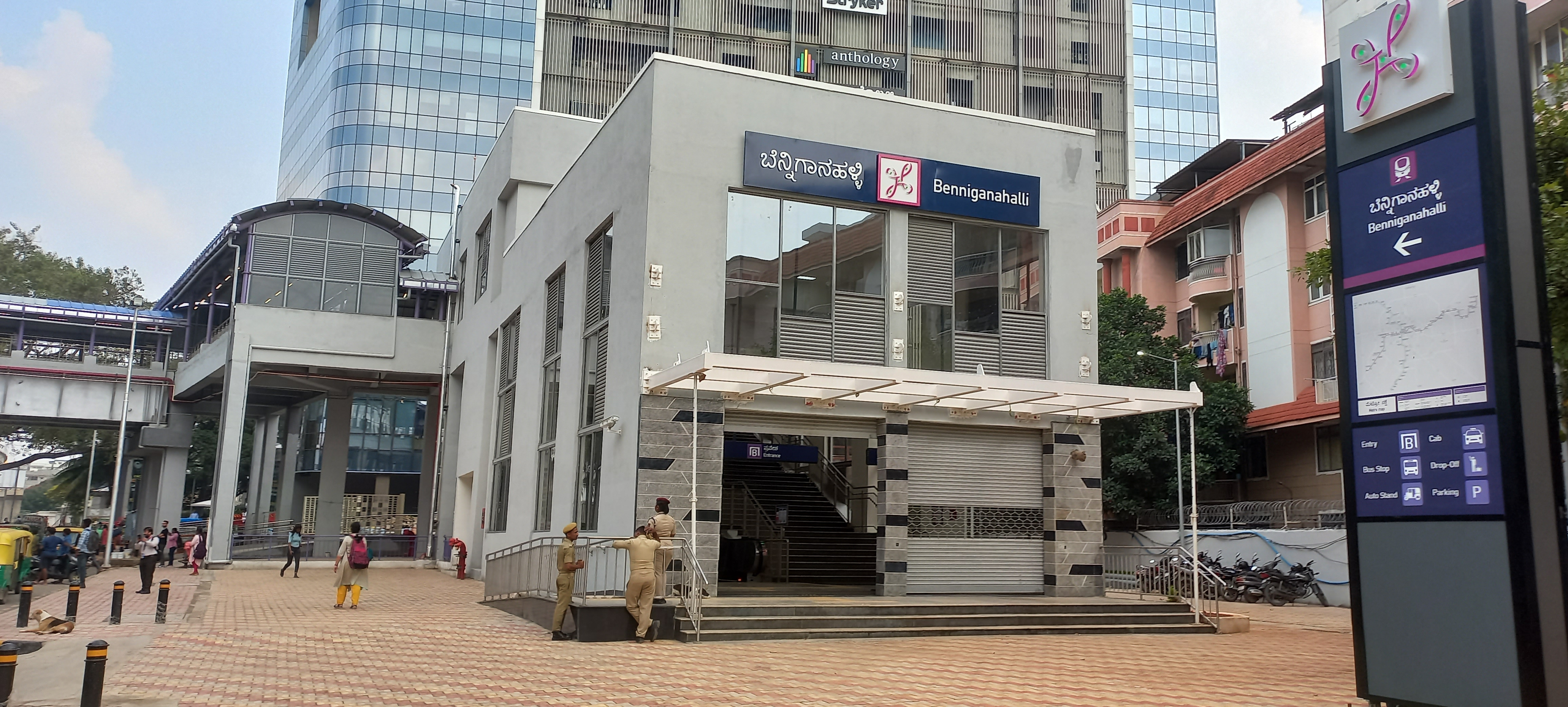
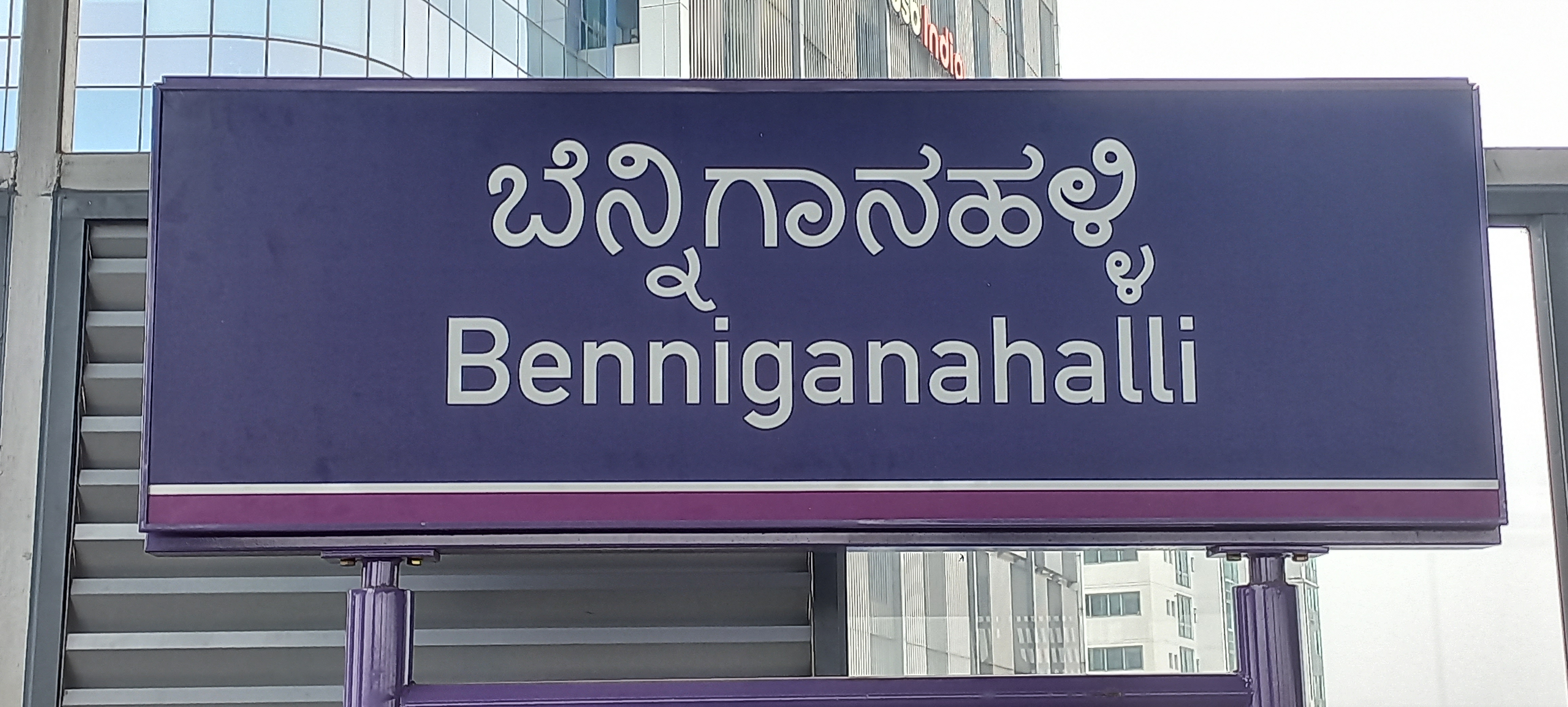
- Newly constructed metro station completely operational under Purple Line of Namma Metro

General information
- Other names: Tin Factory
- Location: 316, Old Madras Rd, next to Salarpuria, Pai Layout, Mahadevapura, Bengaluru, Karnataka 560016
- Coordinates: 12.99655°N 77.66828°E
- System: Namma Metro station
- Owner: Bangalore Metro Rail Corporation Ltd (BMRCL)
- Operator: Namma Metro
- Line: Purple Line
- Platforms: Side platform Platform-1 → Whitefield (Kadugodi); Platform-2 → Challaghatta
- Tracks: 2
- Connections: Tin Factory Bus stop towards Hebbal or towards Krishnarajapuram

Construction
- Structure type: Elevated, Double track
- Platform levels: 2
- Architect: ITD - ITD Cementation India JV

Other information
- Status: Operational & Staffed
- Station code: JTPM

History
- Opened: 9 October 2023; 2 years ago
- Electrified: 750 V DC third rail

Services
Preceding station	Namma Metro	Following station
Krishnarajapura towards Whitefield (Kadugodi)	Purple Line	Baiyappanahalli towards Challaghatta
Route map
Location

Benniganahalli is an elevated metro station on the east-west Purple Line of Bengaluru's Namma Metro transit system. In its vicinity are the Tin Factory Junction leading towards Baiyappanahalli, the Benniganahalli Lake, and the Tin Factory Bus Stop. It was opened to the public on 9 October 2023 without any inauguration ceremony.

The station lies between the Baiyappanahalli station in the west and the Krishnarajapura (KR Pura) station in the east. Baiyappanahalli, part of the first stretch of the entire Namma Metro system, was inaugurated in 2011, and the eastern section of the line from KR Pura to the terminus at Kadugodi was inaugurated in March 2023. However, Benniganahalli station could not be opened due to time-consuming work involving the installation of a girder bridge over railway lines. Trial runs on the stretch commenced on 27 July 2023, and operations finally commenced on 9 October 2023, with an official inauguration conducted virtually by the prime minister later.

The elevated station stands on pillars above the centre of the Old Madras Road. Access is from a new footbridge connecting it with both sides of the road.

Usage of the eastern section of the line increased substantially following the opening of the station. Prior to opening an estimated 28,000 daily passenger journeys to Whitefield were made but on the day of opening the figure increased to 61,179 owing to the connection to KR Pura. Additional baggage scanners were installed soon after the station opened to alleviate long queues forming at security checks. The station is popular with IT professionals commuting from Hoskote and Hebbal to the International Technology Park.

== Station layout ==
G	Street level	Exit/Entrance
L1	Mezzanine	Fare control, station agent, Metro Card vending machines, crossover
L2	Side Platform | Doors will open on the left
L2	Platform 1 Eastbound	Towards → Whitefield (Kadugodi); Next Station: Krishnarajapura; Change at the next station for Blue Line
L2	Platform 2 Westbound	Towards ← Challaghatta; Next Station: Baiyappanahalli
L2	Side Platform | Doors will open on the left
L2

== Entry/Exit ==
There are 2 Entry/Exit points - A and B. Commuters can use either of the points for their travel.

- Entry/Exit point A: Towards Dooravani Nagar side
- Entry/Exit point B: Towards Hebbal / Baiyappanahalli side

== Nearby ==
In connection with the metro line Bengaluru Metro Rail Corporation Limited (BMRCL) has carried out access improvement work and installed facilities at Benniganahalli Lake immediately north west of the station. Pai Layout residents requested that BMRCL name the metro station after the lake.

Although the tracks for the Blue Line of Namma Metro between Krishnarajapura and Kasturi Nagar run parallel to the Purple Line tracks between Krishnarajapura and Benniganahalli, the metro station is not planned to be an interchange between these lines, similar to the preceding station. Practical reasons for this include land and construction constraints, especially due to the presence of multiple railway lines, flyovers, and a lake in the vicinity of the region. Another possible reason for this decision is that the metro station already experiences lengthy queues during peak hours (due to there being only one point each for entry and exit, unlike most stations which have two), and restricting interchange flux to Krishnarajapura (which has two points for entry and exit on either side of the station) rather than splitting it between the two stations would prevent further strain on the Benniganahalli metro station and its logistics.

== See also ==
- Bangalore
- List of Namma Metro stations
- Transport in Karnataka
- List of metro systems
- List of rapid transit systems in India
- Bangalore Metropolitan Transport Corporation
