= Ramamurthy Nagar =

Ramamurthy Nagar Ramurthynagar
- neighbourhood
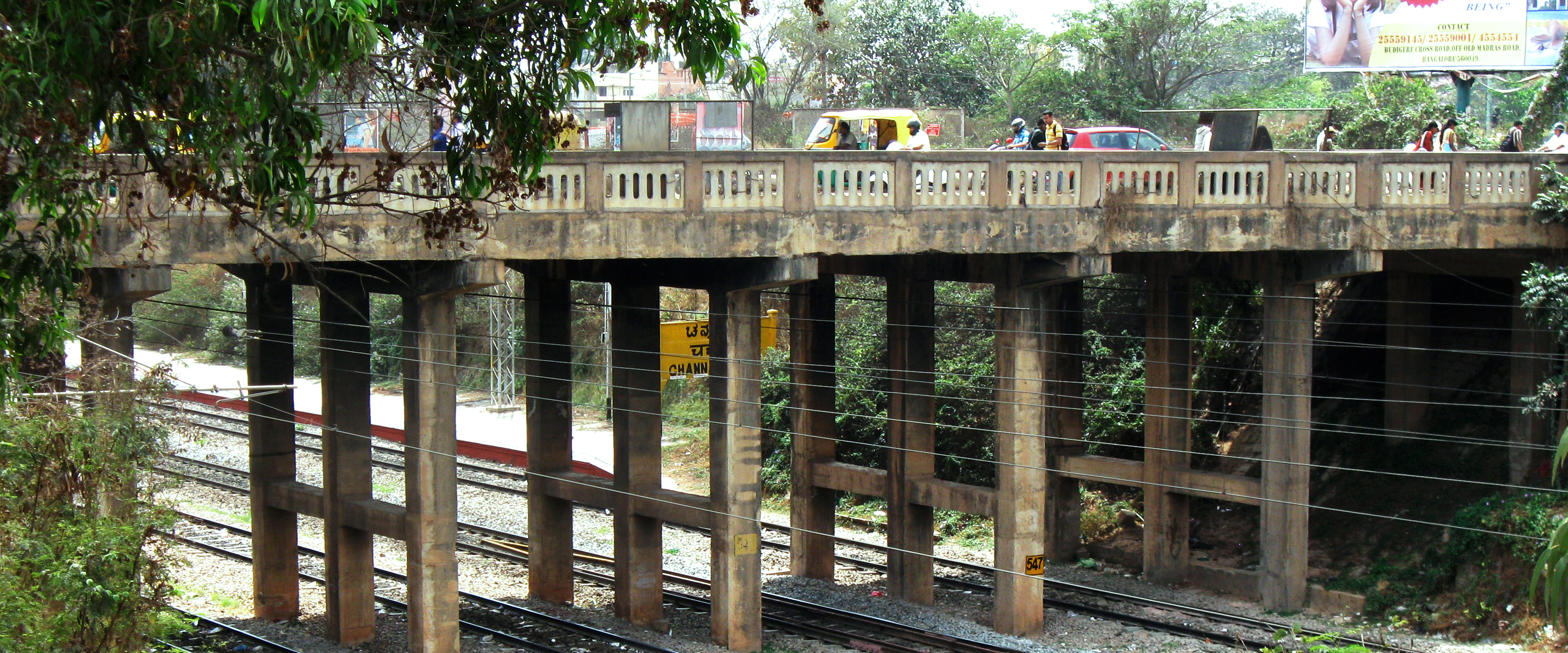
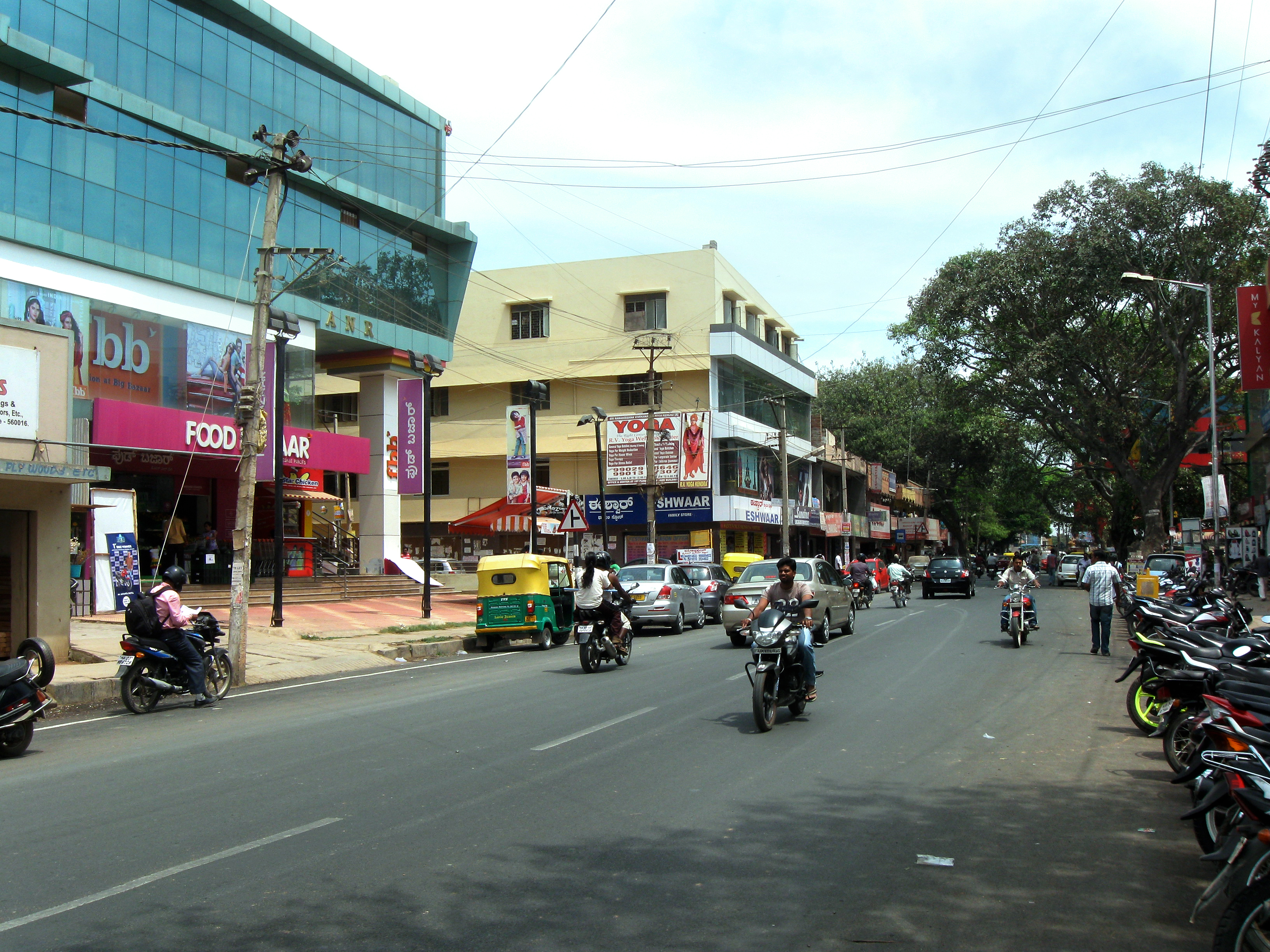
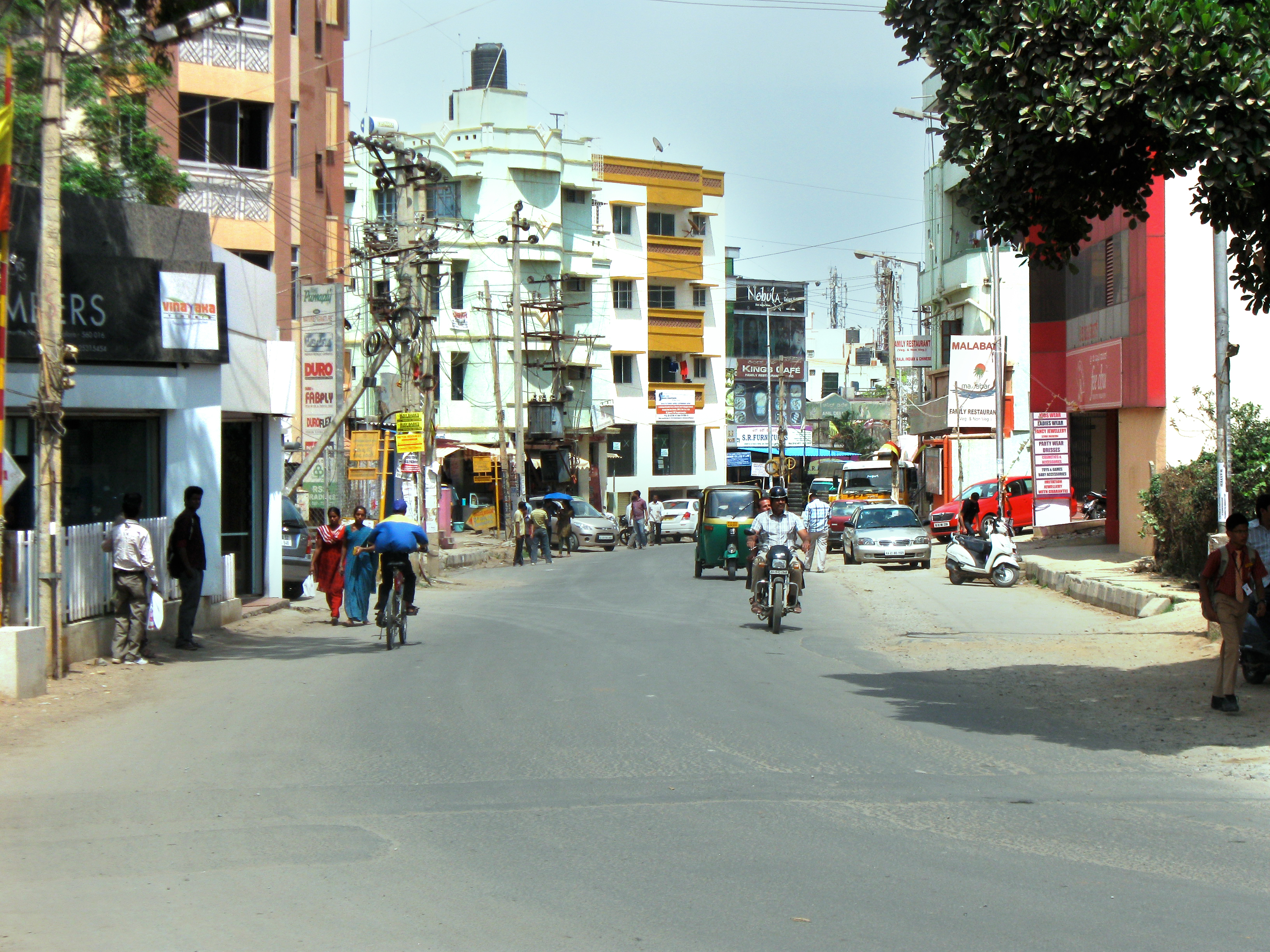
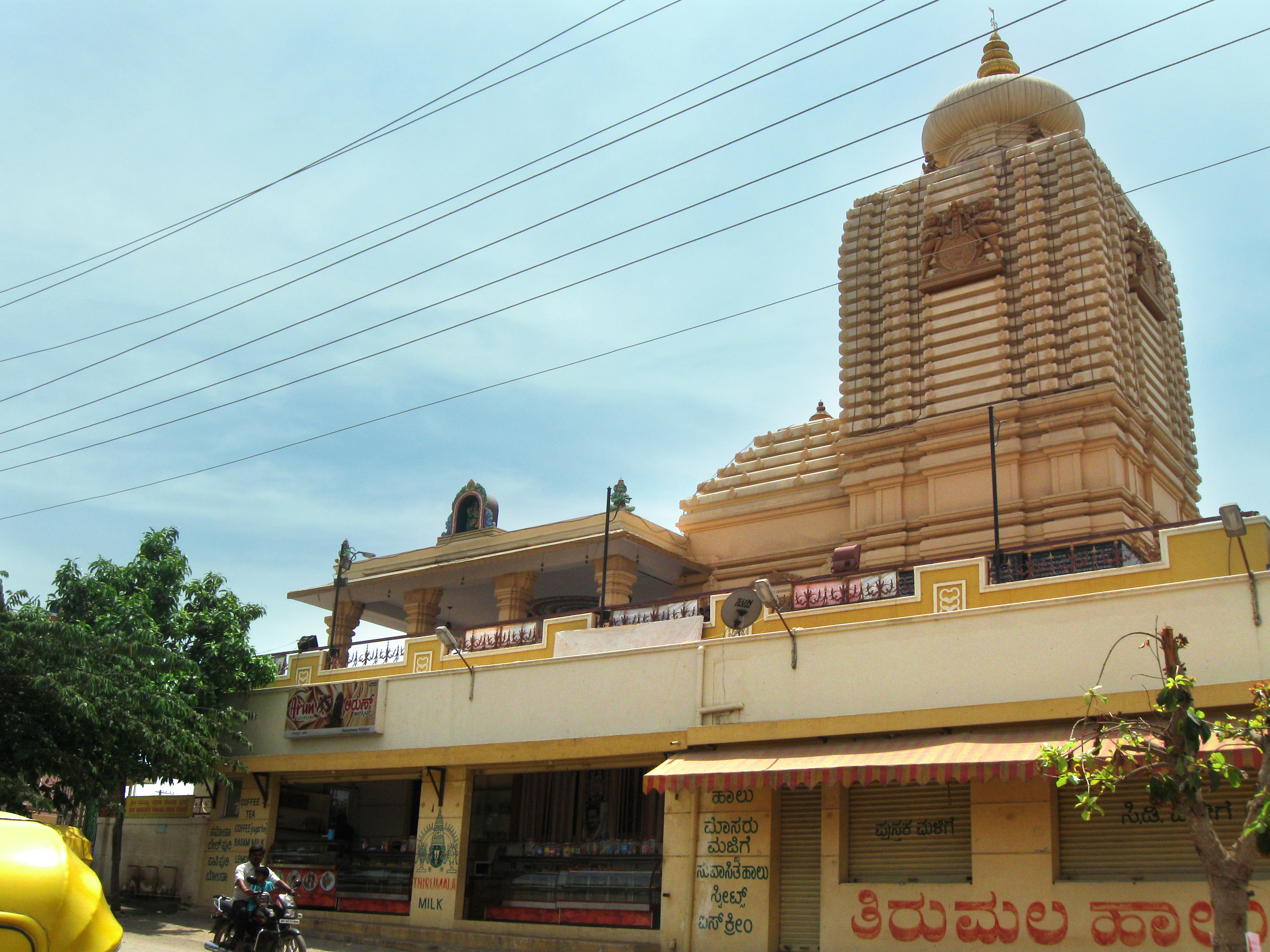
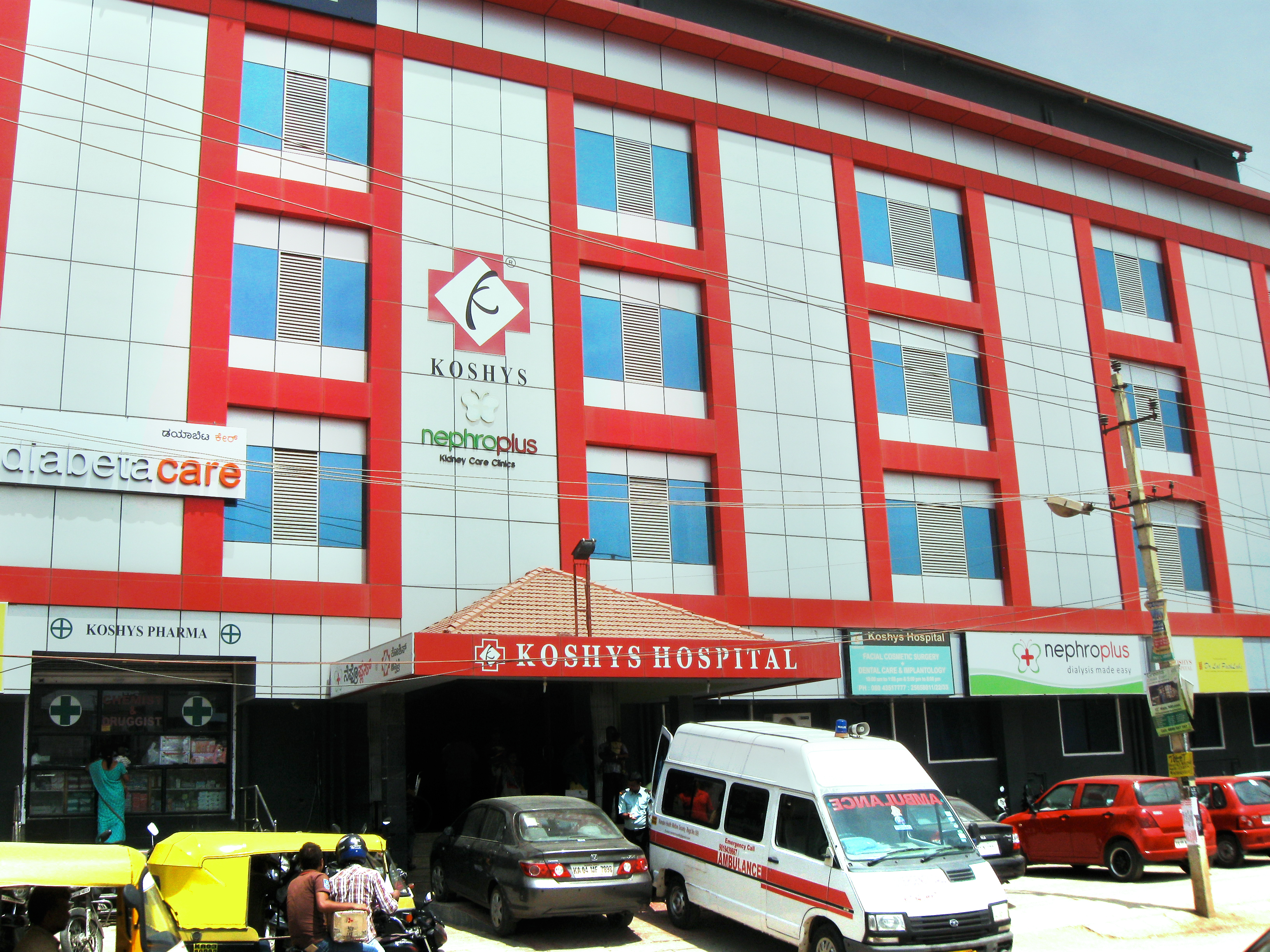
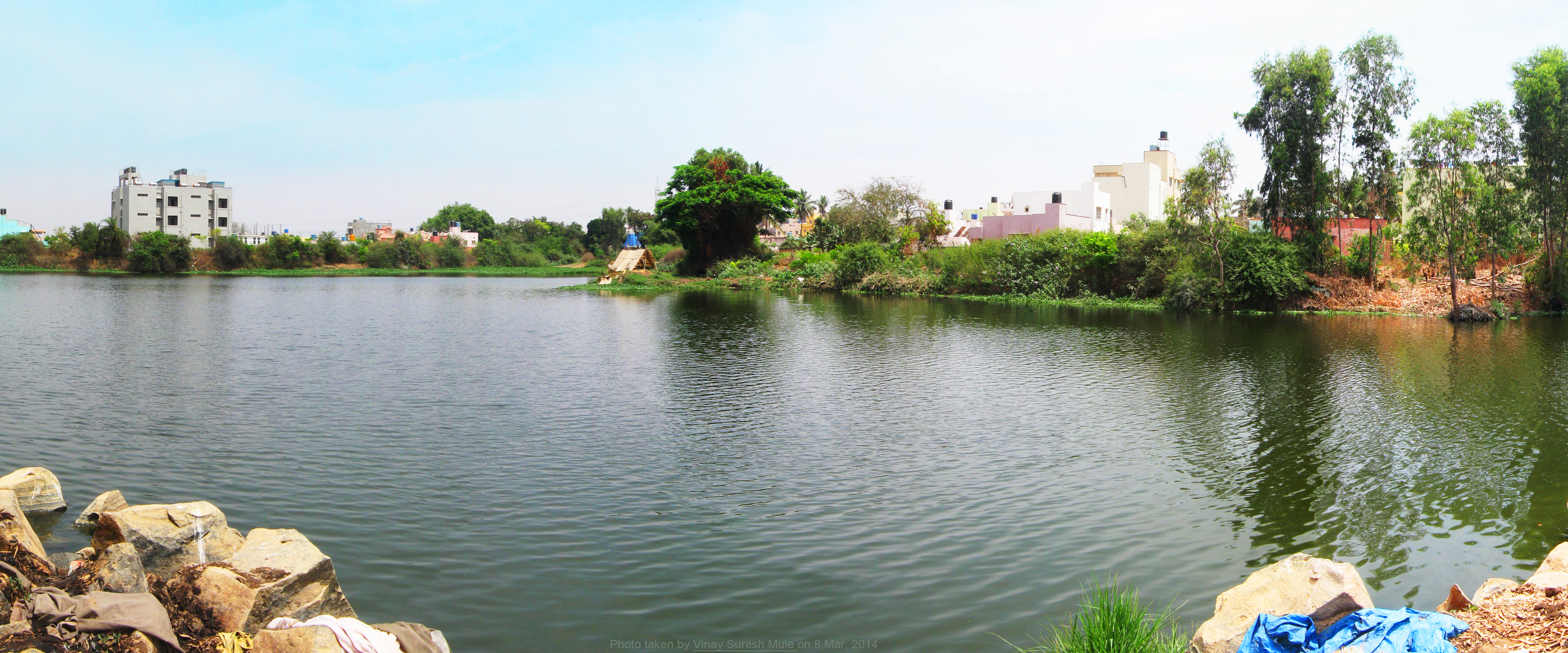
- Clockwise from top: RM Nagar Railway bridge, TC Palya Mainroad, Koshy's Hospital, Varanasi Lake, Sundar Anjaneya temple, RM Nagar Main Road

- Location of Ramamurthy Nagar, shown in red, in Bangalore
- Coordinates: 12°58′N 77°34′E
- Country: India
- State: Karnataka
- District: Bangalore Urban
- Metro: Bangalore
- Zone: Mahadevpura
- Wards: no.25, 26, 51, 52,54, 55 & 56

Languages
  - Official: Kannada
- Time zone: UTC+5:30 (IST)
- PIN: 560016
- Telephone code: 91-80
- Vehicle registration: KA 53
- Lok Sabha: Bangalore North
- Vidhan Sabha: K R Puram

Ramamurthy Nagar ([ɾːɱʊrʈɪnəɡəɾ]) is an area in Bangalore in the Indian state of Karnataka. It is located in the eastern part of Bangalore and comes under the E3 subdivision of BBMP. It is a rapidly growing suburb, adjacent to other areas such as Banaswadi, CV Raman Nagar and Krishnarajapura.

Ramamurthy Nagar today is near the outer ring road and close to four important railway stations: Krishnarajapura, Baiyappanahalli, Banaswadi and B. Channasandra.

Ramamurthy Nagar has many layouts, namely Garden Street Layout, Akshayanagar, Devaki Apparao Layout, Muneshwara Nagar, Bovi Colony, Pragathi Layout, Hoysalanagar, Dr Ambedkar Nagar, Shanti Layout and Gundappa Layout.

Hospitals, Manipal Clinic, and Koshys Hospital and many schools are strategically located in Ramamurthy Nagar.

After the drainage pipes were laid in 2013, BBMP has laid roads in all the areas which were previously untarred. Currently Ramamurthy Nagar is provided with water through the Bangalore Water Supply and Sewerage Board's (BWSSB) Cauvery water connection.

Large-scale real estate development in Ramamurthy Nagar is causing damage. The Gangadhar Kere (Kaudenahalli Lake) is being encroached upon, destroying an area formerly rich in flora and fauna. Most of the borewells which were drilled in earlier days have dried up. Like other newly developing areas, there are no areas for gardens and parks.

Ramamurthy Nagara's 7 wards overview
Ward No.	Ward Name	Population(2011)census	Land area in sq km
25	Horamavu	95,368	17.32
26	R M Nagara	47,358	7.3
51	Vijnanapura	46,159	2.1
52	K R Pura	35,168	4.8
54	Hoodi (exclave)	50,191	15.3
55	Devasandra	33,946	3.52
56	A Narayanapura	43,443	2.1
Source: BBMP ward info

== History ==
The new residential settlements around Yerraiana Palya village are called Ramamurthy Nagar. Yerraiahna Palya is a small village with a history dating back more than 200 years. According to oral and agricultural land documents one Shri. Yerraiah/Yerrappa belonged to the warrior tribe Boya or Beda or Nayaka community along with his family members had settled in this village by building small thatched huts initially. They had come from Dandu Pradesha (the cantonment area) in old Bengaluru (present-day Shivajinagar). Their ancestors lived around the Muthyalamma Temple on Thimmaiah Road in what is now Shivajinagar. Due to a devastating outbreak of disease (probably a plague) which wreaked havoc in Bengaluru, many people in that area fled the congested old city and moved into makeshift huts built in orchards and open fields in the surrounding countryside in order to isolate themselves and avoid infection. Yerraiah was the leader of one such small family group. He brought his near and dear ones out from their dwellings at Dandu Pradesha (cantonment) due to fear of epidemic and built a small group of huts. When the epidemic abated, they seem to have decided not to go back, because the memories of so many loved ones dying was painful, and also, they were not rich people but very poor people and they had found work as agricultural labour in the lush fields and orchards of their new settlement. That settlement began to be known as Yerraiahna Palya, village of yerraiah, in honour of the leader.

For the better part of two centuries, little changed in the village. Thereafter, the city Bangalore began growing. Agricultural lands around the village were gradually transformed into residential layouts. By the mid-1980s, the Bangalore Development Authority (BDA) had developed some of the areas in north-east Bengaluru, like OMBR Layout, HRBR Layout, Kasturi Nagar and East of NGEF Layout. The region beyond that was Ramamurthy Nagar, which still remained mainly farmland. It was the IT boom of the mid-and late 90s which took Yerraiah Palya in its sweep. Much of the IT parks are in the East Bangalore area, and Yerraiah Palya is in the same regoion. In the vicinity of these well-planned BDA layouts, Ramamurthy Nagar became a desirable place to live. This area is not developed by the BDA. The farmers converted their farms into layouts and sold the sites to interested buyers which soon became home for the bank employees, ITI staff employees and later software professionals by mid-2000. The BDA developed layouts had all civic amenities, and the growth of these layouts influenced the growth of Ramamurthy Nagar to the great extent, both residentially and commercially.

Ramamurthy Nagar was previously farmland with moist soil, and many snakes living there. With the increased residential settlement, the snakes have slowly disappeared due to the loss of their habitat.

Until the early 2010s, there were not many tarred roads. Streetlights were few. Water connection was nonexistent. Borewells and water tankers were the only sources of water. On drilling borewells, water was available by 300 feet. The sewage was guided to a pit. The region came under BBMP in 2008 and drastic development took place.

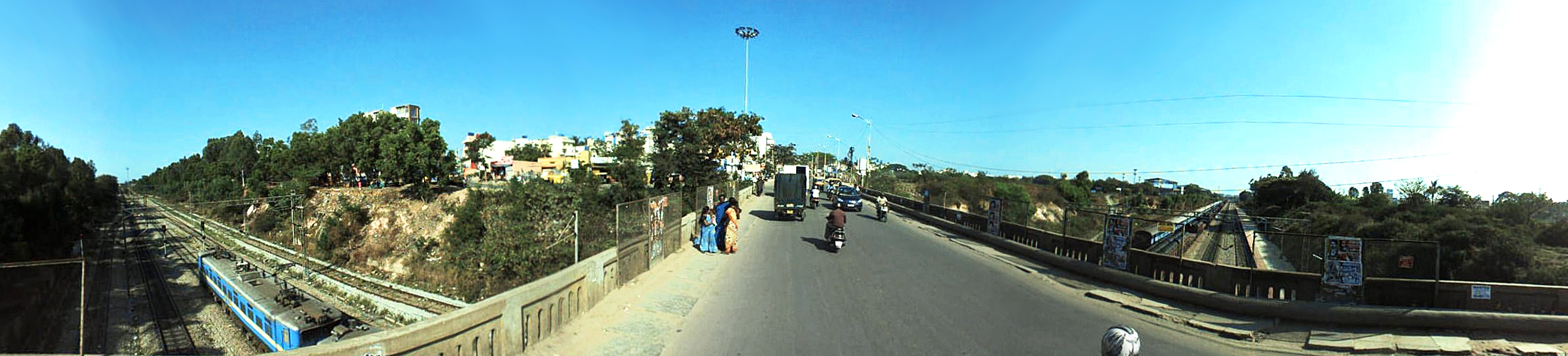
Panoramic view of Ramamurthy Nagar bridge

== Climate ==
Under the Köppen climate classification, Bangalore, including Ramamurthy Nagar itself, experiences a tropical savanna climate. Due to its high elevation, a more moderate climate throughout the year is experienced, although occasional heat waves can make summer somewhat uncomfortable. The coolest month is December with an average low temperature of 15.4 °C (59.7 °F) and the hottest month is April with an average high temperature of 36 °C (97 °F). The highest temperature ever recorded is 38.9 °C (102 °F) (recorded in March 1931). The lowest ever recorded is 7.8 °C (46 °F) (recorded in January 1884). Winter temperatures rarely drop below 12 °C (54 °F), and summer temperatures seldom exceed 37 °C (99 °F). Receiving rainfall from both the northeast and the southwest monsoons; the wettest months are September, October and August. The summer heat is moderated by fairly frequent thunderstorms, which occasionally cause power outages and local flooding. The heaviest rainfall recorded in a 24-hour period is 179 millimetres (7 in) recorded on 1 October 1997.

Climate data for Bengaluru (1991–2020, extremes 1883–present)
Month	Jan	Feb	Mar	Apr	May	Jun	Jul	Aug	Sep	Oct	Nov	Dec	Year
Record high °C (°F)	33.4 (92.1)	35.9 (96.6)	37.9 (100.2)	39.2 (102.6)	38.9 (102.0)	38.1 (100.6)	33.3 (91.9)	33.3 (91.9)	33.3 (91.9)	32.4 (90.3)	33.0 (91.4)	31.1 (88.0)	39.2 (102.6)
Mean maximum °C (°F)	31.1 (88.0)	34.1 (93.4)	35.5 (95.9)	37.0 (98.6)	35.8 (96.4)	31.8 (89.2)	31.1 (88.0)	30.8 (87.4)	31.4 (88.5)	31.4 (88.5)	30.8 (87.4)	30.3 (86.5)	37.2 (99.0)
Mean daily maximum °C (°F)	28.4 (83.1)	30.9 (87.6)	33.4 (92.1)	34.1 (93.4)	33.1 (91.6)	29.7 (85.5)	28.3 (82.9)	28.1 (82.6)	28.6 (83.5)	28.5 (83.3)	27.4 (81.3)	26.9 (80.4)	29.8 (85.6)
Daily mean °C (°F)	22.3 (72.1)	24.3 (75.7)	26.8 (80.2)	28.1 (82.6)	27.4 (81.3)	25.2 (77.4)	24.2 (75.6)	24.1 (75.4)	24.3 (75.7)	24.0 (75.2)	22.9 (73.2)	21.7 (71.1)	24.6 (76.3)
Mean daily minimum °C (°F)	16.1 (61.0)	17.6 (63.7)	20.2 (68.4)	22.1 (71.8)	21.8 (71.2)	20.6 (69.1)	20.1 (68.2)	20.0 (68.0)	20.0 (68.0)	19.8 (67.6)	18.3 (64.9)	16.4 (61.5)	19.4 (66.9)
Mean minimum °C (°F)	13.4 (56.1)	14.9 (58.8)	17.3 (63.1)	20.5 (68.9)	20.5 (68.9)	19.5 (67.1)	19.2 (66.6)	18.4 (65.1)	17.2 (63.0)	16.6 (61.9)	15.3 (59.5)	14.2 (57.6)	12.7 (54.9)
Record low °C (°F)	7.8 (46.0)	9.4 (48.9)	11.1 (52.0)	14.4 (57.9)	16.7 (62.1)	16.7 (62.1)	16.1 (61.0)	14.4 (57.9)	15.0 (59.0)	13.2 (55.8)	9.6 (49.3)	8.9 (48.0)	7.8 (46.0)
Average rainfall mm (inches)	1.6 (0.06)	7.1 (0.28)	14.7 (0.58)	61.7 (2.43)	128.7 (5.07)	110.3 (4.34)	116.4 (4.58)	162.7 (6.41)	208.3 (8.20)	186.4 (7.34)	64.5 (2.54)	15.4 (0.61)	1,077.8 (42.43)
Average rainy days	0.2	0.3	1.1	4.0	7.5	6.8	8.0	10.2	9.5	9.6	4.2	1.3	62.7
Average relative humidity (%) (at 17:30 IST)	41	32	29	35	47	62	65	67	64	65	61	53	52
Average dew point °C (°F)	13 (55)	12 (54)	13 (55)	17 (63)	19 (66)	19 (66)	19 (66)	19 (66)	19 (66)	18 (64)	17 (63)	15 (59)	17 (62)
Mean monthly sunshine hours	262.3	247.6	271.4	257.0	241.1	136.8	111.8	114.3	143.6	173.1	190.2	211.7	2,360.9
Average ultraviolet index	10	12	12	12	12	12	12	12	12	12	10	10	12
Source 1: India Meteorological Department Time and Date (dewpoints, 2005–2015)
Source 2: NOAA (sun: 1971–1990), Tokyo Climate Center (mean temperatures 1991–2020); Weather Atlas March record high

== Lakes ==
Ramamurthy Nagar was historically filled with lakes. It was surrounded by a single water body which today is split up into Kalkere, Maragondanahalli, Kithanagur and Yellamma lakes (also known as Yele Mallappa Shetty Lake). Today the Ramamurthynagar Bruhat Bengaluru Mahanagara Palike (BBMP) map shows a total of four lakes:

- Jayanthinagar Lake
- Kowdenahalli Lake, also known as Gangadhara Kere
- Kithaganur Lake, Good Lake
- Varanasi lake (lake in the Varanasi area)

There was a fifth lake which recently dried up and is less well-known, Umrah Kitaganur Lake. It was located approximately 300 meters north of Bhattrahalli Lake and Garden City College.

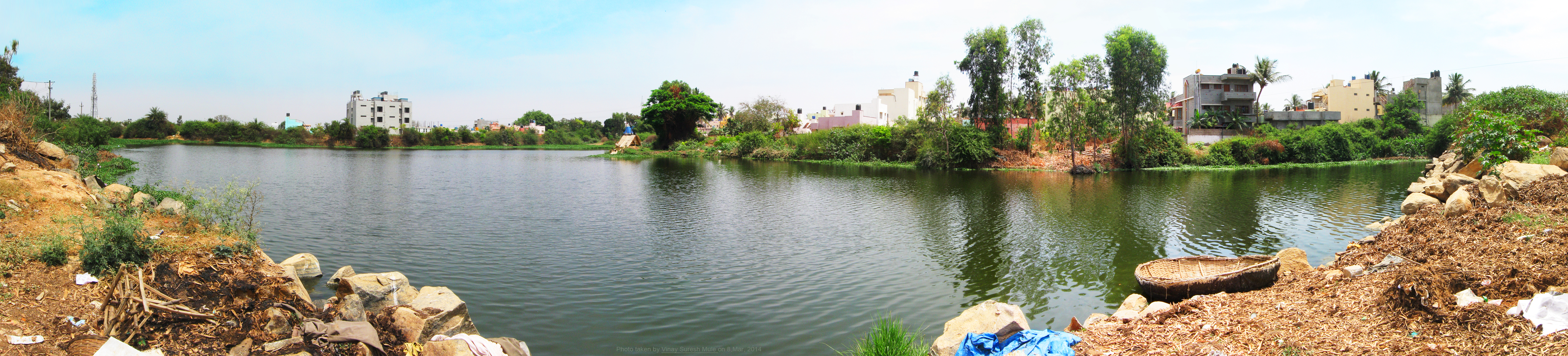
Panoramic view of Varanasi Lake in Ramamurthy Nagar

All the above-listed lakes are in bad condition. Jayanthinagar Lake and Kowdenahalli Lake are covered with weeds and algae. Kowdenahalli Lake has been subjected to rampant encroachments and sewage inflow. Kithanagur lake is drying up. While Varanasi Lake looks healthy, temporary encroachments (huts) and garbage accumulation can be seen along its edges. BBMP has fenced all these lakes with barbed wire to avoid residential encroachments, but has failed to rejuvenate the lakes. Ill maintenance of the lakes has led to stagnant water pockets which are a breeding spot for mosquitoes. Water contamination by nearby industries has killed up to 40,000 fish.

== Places of worship ==
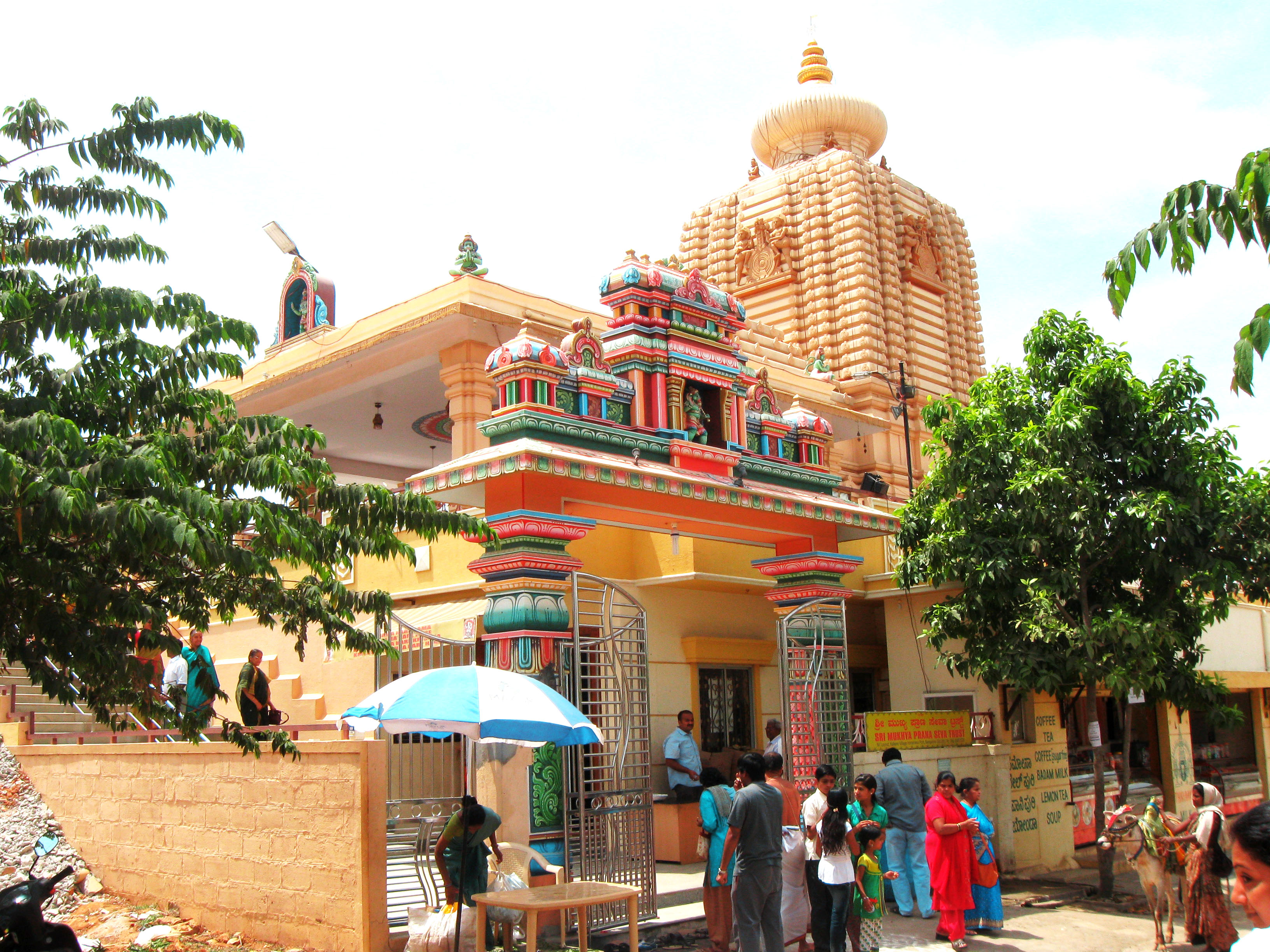
Sri Sundara Anjaneya Swami Temple

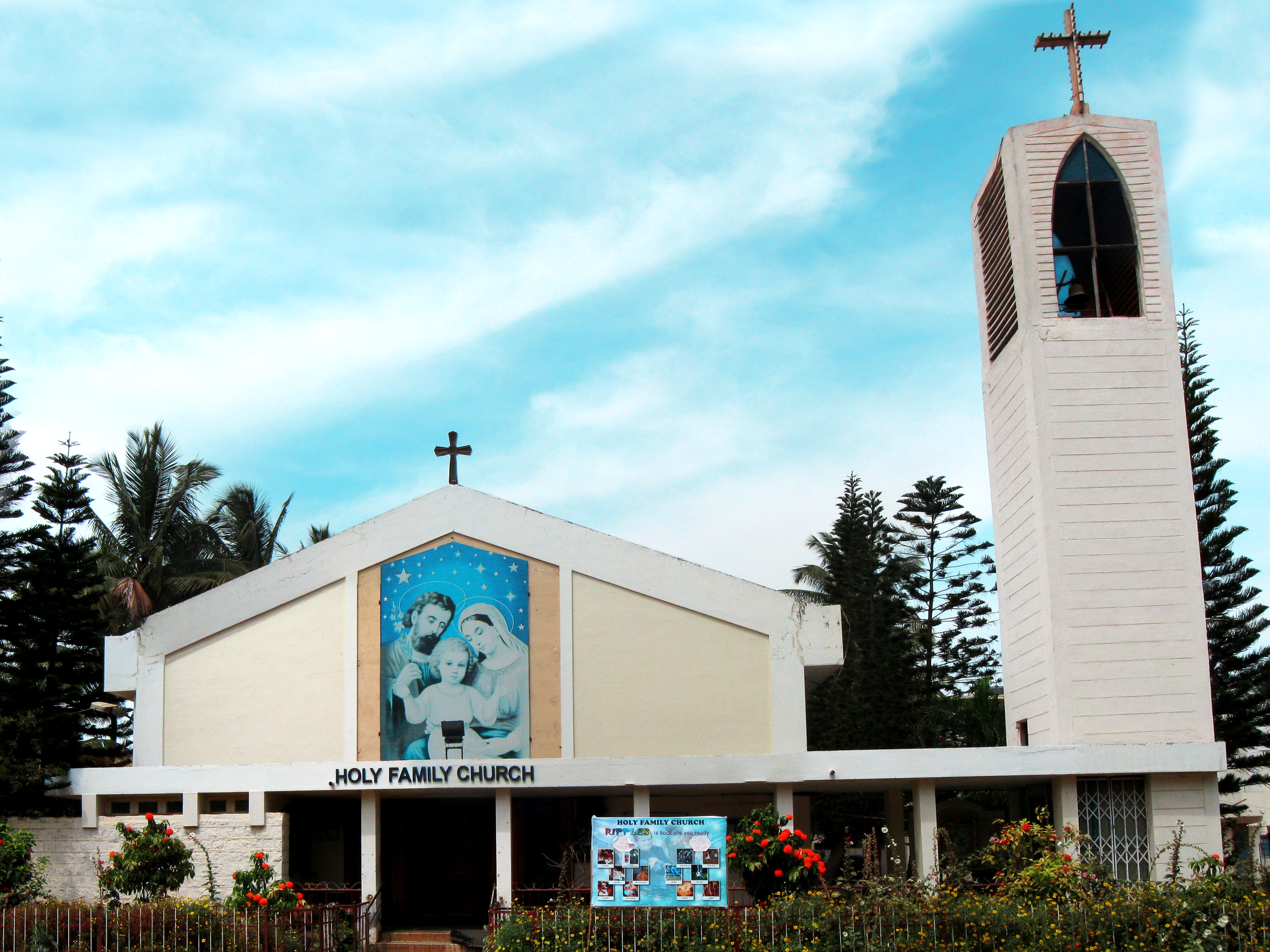
Holy Family Church

=== Temples ===
There are many temples in Yerraiahna Palya/Ramamurthy Nagar, including the old Marammana gudi, Muneswarana gudi, KodandaRama temple, Raja Veera Madakari Nayaka Sabha Bhavana in old Yerraiahna Palya; the Sri Sundara Anjaneya Swami Temple in NRI layout, built in 2008, reflects the Orissa temple style architecture.

Others include Shree Shiva Shakthi Ganapathi Devasthana, Lakshmi Venkateshwara, Kanaka Vinayaka, Shaneshwara, Anjaneya, Renuka Yellamma, Ankamma Devi, Eshwara, Maha Munishwara, Ganesha, Shiva Shakthi, Samayapuram Mariamman Temple, Devi Yellamma, and Siddhi Vinayaka temples.

=== Churches ===
Ramamurthy Nagar's well-known church is the Holy Family Church located on the RM Nagar road near the Ramamurthy Nagar main bus stop. This Catholic church, which was built in 1973, is one of the oldest churches in North Bangalore. Its atmosphere is not so quiet due to its presence on the busy noisy main road.

St. Mary's Church is a Syro-Malabar Church, located by Varanasi Main Road (near Sree Rama Gas Agency Godown) in Ramamurthy Nagar. On 15 August 2008, Bangalore Archbishop raised the fellowship into a parish. The Vincentian congregation gladly took their pastoral leadership.

St. Joseph's Orthodox Syrian Church is a Malankara Orthodox Syrian Church which was a part of St. Thomas Orthodox Maya Edavaka. It became an independent church on 2 April 2017 by HG Dr. Abraham Mar Seraphim, Bishop of Bangalore Diocese. Now there are more than 60 families in the church, and it has a vicar as its main priest. The church is located in Kasturinagar.

Other churches include Bridge Church, The Pentecostal, Church of the Jesus Christ, David Memorial, Silolem, ABC church, Kadesh Nak Seo, Zion Sungnam, and End time age deliverance.

=== Mosques ===
There are a few mosques in Ramamurthy Nagar, like the Makkah-Masjid-Ahle-Sunnath-Ul-Jamath, Jamia masjid, Masjid-e-Nirman, Touhid Mosque and Illahi.

== Transportation ==
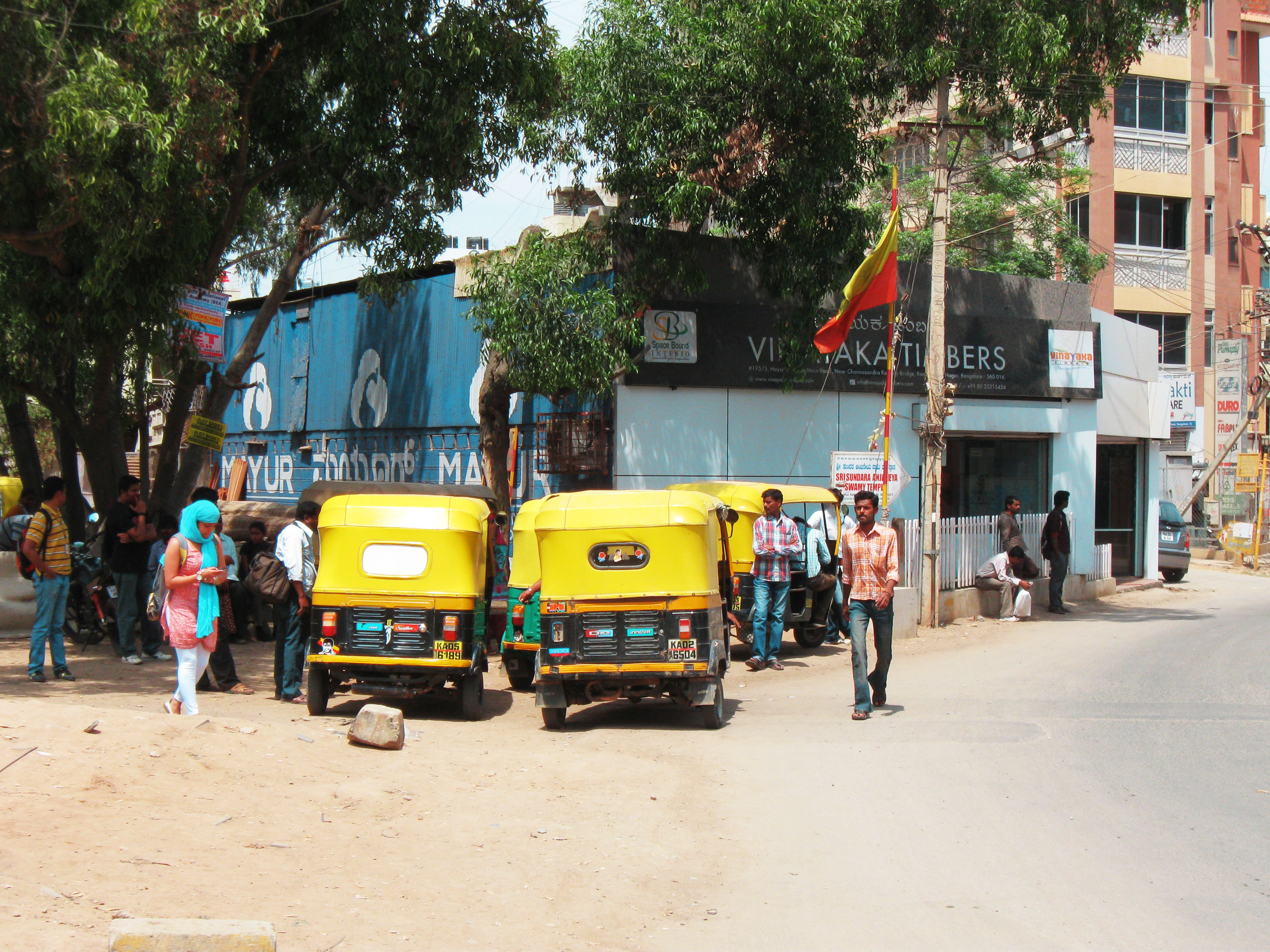
Rickshaws on a sharing basis seen on T.C.Palya road entrance

Ramamurthy Nagar has two important main roads, T.C. Palya main road and RM Nagar main road, which are its lifelines. It is well-connected to the entire city in terms of transportation.

=== Rickshaws ===
Ramamurthy Nagar is one of the few places in Bangalore where auto rickshaws run on a sharing basis. This is mostly seen all along T.C. Palya road where one commuter shares the fare with other passengers.

=== Metro ===
The suburb is served by three metro stations of Namma Metro: Baiyappanahalli, Benniganahalli and Krishnarajapura on the Purple Line connecting the western and eastern parts of Bangalore. The Krishnarajapuram railway station, an important railway junction in Bangalore, is 1 km away and is soon proposed to be a station for Bangalore Commuter Rail.

=== Buses ===
BMTC runs a fleet of buses to Ramamurthy Nagar, connecting it with all the important business districts in the city.

Ramamurthy Nagar bus route—schematic diagram

Origin	Via	Bus numbers
KBS (Majestic)	T.C.Palya Road	301F,315DN, 315T
KBS (Majestic)	Ramamurthy Nagar Police Stn.	300C, 300H,315D, 315H, 315K, 315L, 315P, 315U
Shivajinagar	T.C.Palya Road	301E
Shivajinagar	Ramamurthy Nagar Police Stn.	300E, 300F, 300K, 300P, 300T,311, 311C, 311F
K. R. Market	Ramamurthy Nagar Police Stn.	313B, 313D, 313F, 313L
Domlur	Ramamurthy Nagar Police Stn.	MF-9,315U
Electronic City	Ramamurthy Nagar Police Stn.	500H
ITPL	B Channasandra Underpass.	506A, 500QK, 601, V-502G
Intnl. Airport [KIA]	B Channasandra Underpass.	KIAS-8
Manyata Tech Park	Ramamurthy Nagar Police Stn.	507
Random	Kalkere Main road	303A, 301G,301D,303G, 301

The metro feeder bus helps in connecting with the metro stations of the purple line. Buses to airport and ITPL are available only at B Channasandra stop which is near Ramamurthy Nagar bridge. KIAS (Kempegowda International Airport Shuttle) connects Ramamurthy Nagar to the Bangalore Airport.

== Civic administration ==
=== Politics ===
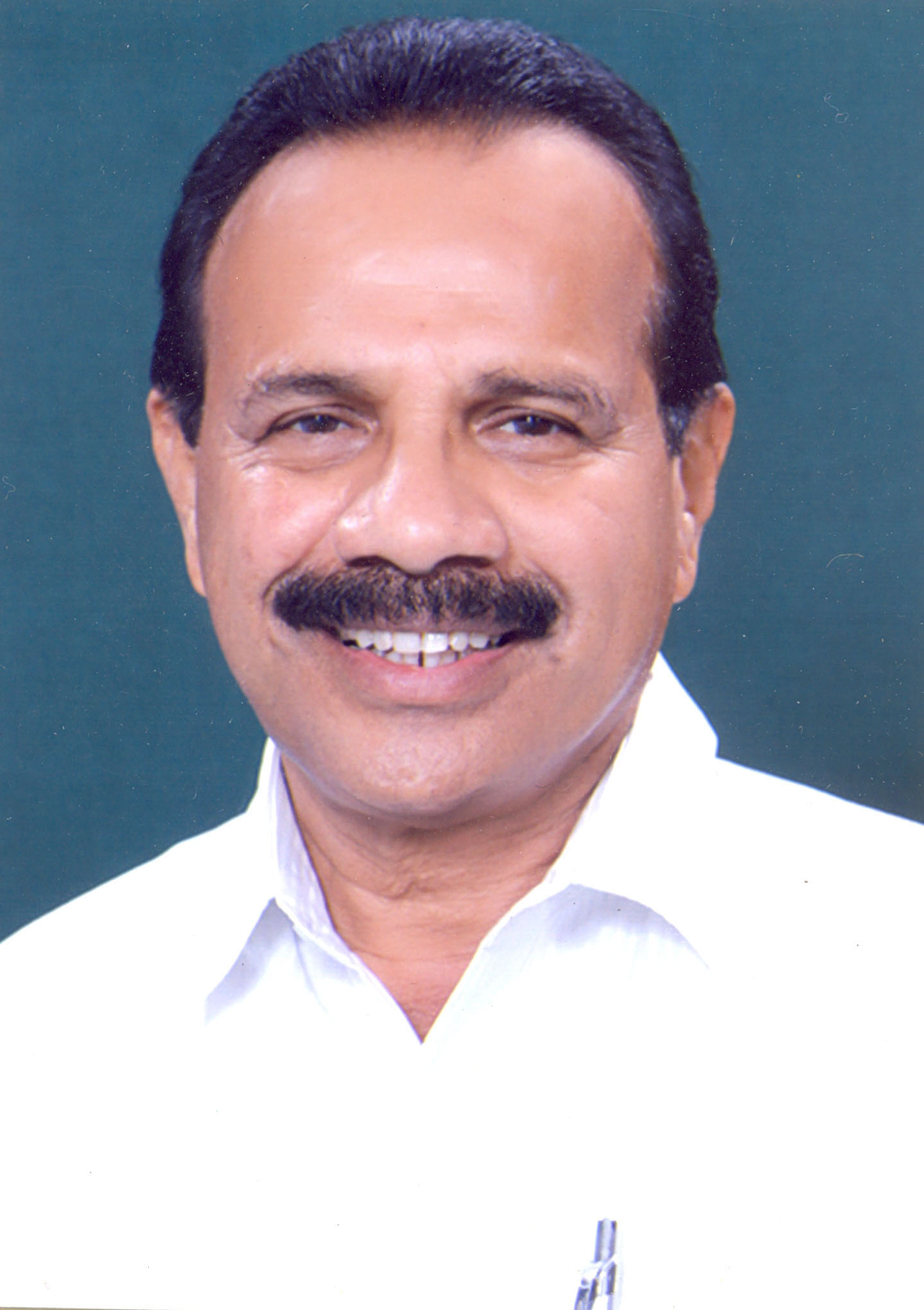
D. V. Sadananda Gowda is the current MP for(Bangalore North)

Ramamurthy Nagar is placed in K R Puram Assembly constituency (Vidhana Sabha) led by MLA B.A. Basavaraj. K R Puram in turn comes under Bangalore North (Lok Sabha constituency) led by MP D. V. Sadananda Gowda who was also the ex Chief Minister of Karnataka. During the general elections 2014 D. V. Sadananda Gowda contesting through BJP won with 52.91% majority defeating C. Narayanaswamy of INC. MLA B.A. Basavaraj contesting through INC won the Karnataka Legislative Assembly election, 2013 from K R Puram by a margin of 24001 votes defeating N S Nandiesha Reddy of BJP.

=== Wards ===
Ramamurthy Nagar Wards

Ramamurthy Nagar has a total of seven wards spread across it. It has one of the exclaves of Hudi ward while other wards are partially inside it. None of the wards are fully inside Ramamurthy Nagar.

Ward no.	Ward name	Corporator
25	Horamavu	Radhamma
26	Ramamurthy Nagar	Padmavathi S.
51	Vijnanapura	S Raju
52	K.R.Puram	K Poornima
54	Hudi	Hariprasad AC
55	Deavasandra	M N Srikanth
56	A.Narayanapura	V Suresh

=== Post office ===
Ramamurthy Nagar post office is located on the first floor above Iyengar Bakery in 10th main across the RM Nagar main road. The pin code for the area is 560016.

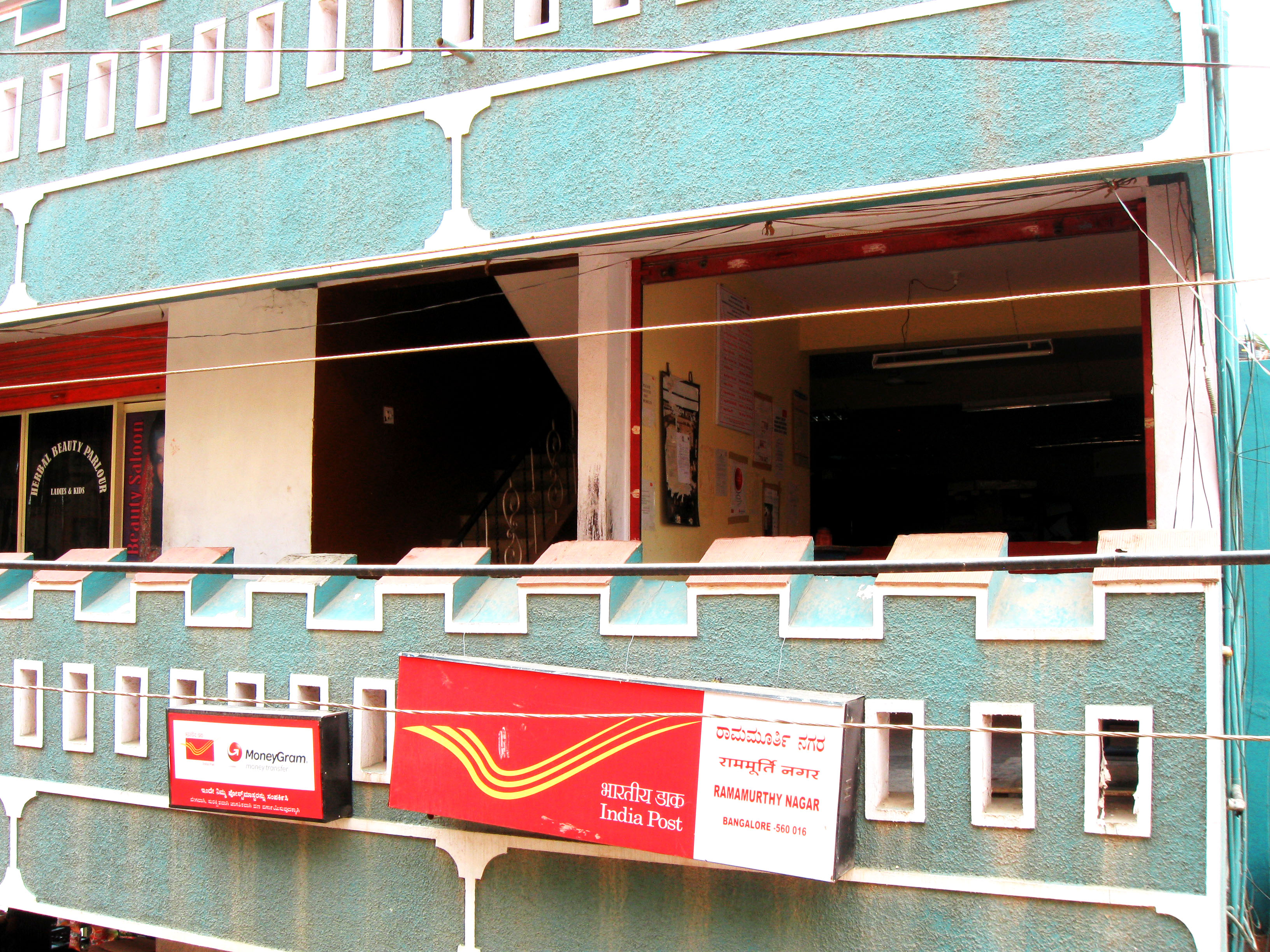
Post office above 10th main Iyengar Bakery

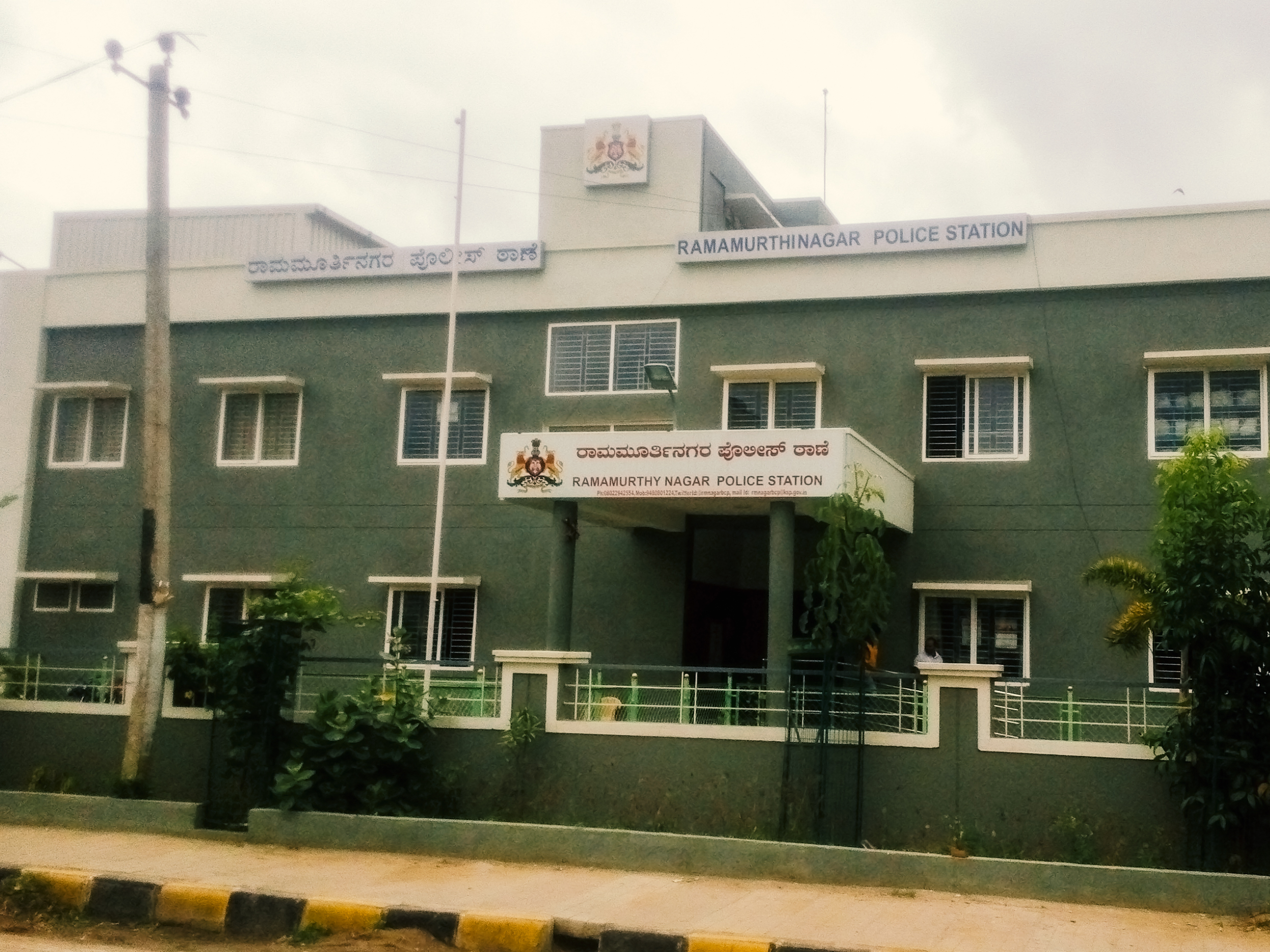
New police station constructed near the RUB

=== Police station ===
Ramamurthy Nagar police station was earlier located on the busy RM Nagar main road. The newly constructed police station is now near the SAIL yard on the way to the road under bridge. It comes under the jurisdiction of East division DCP of Bangalore city and Krishnarajapura division ACP.

== Hospitals ==
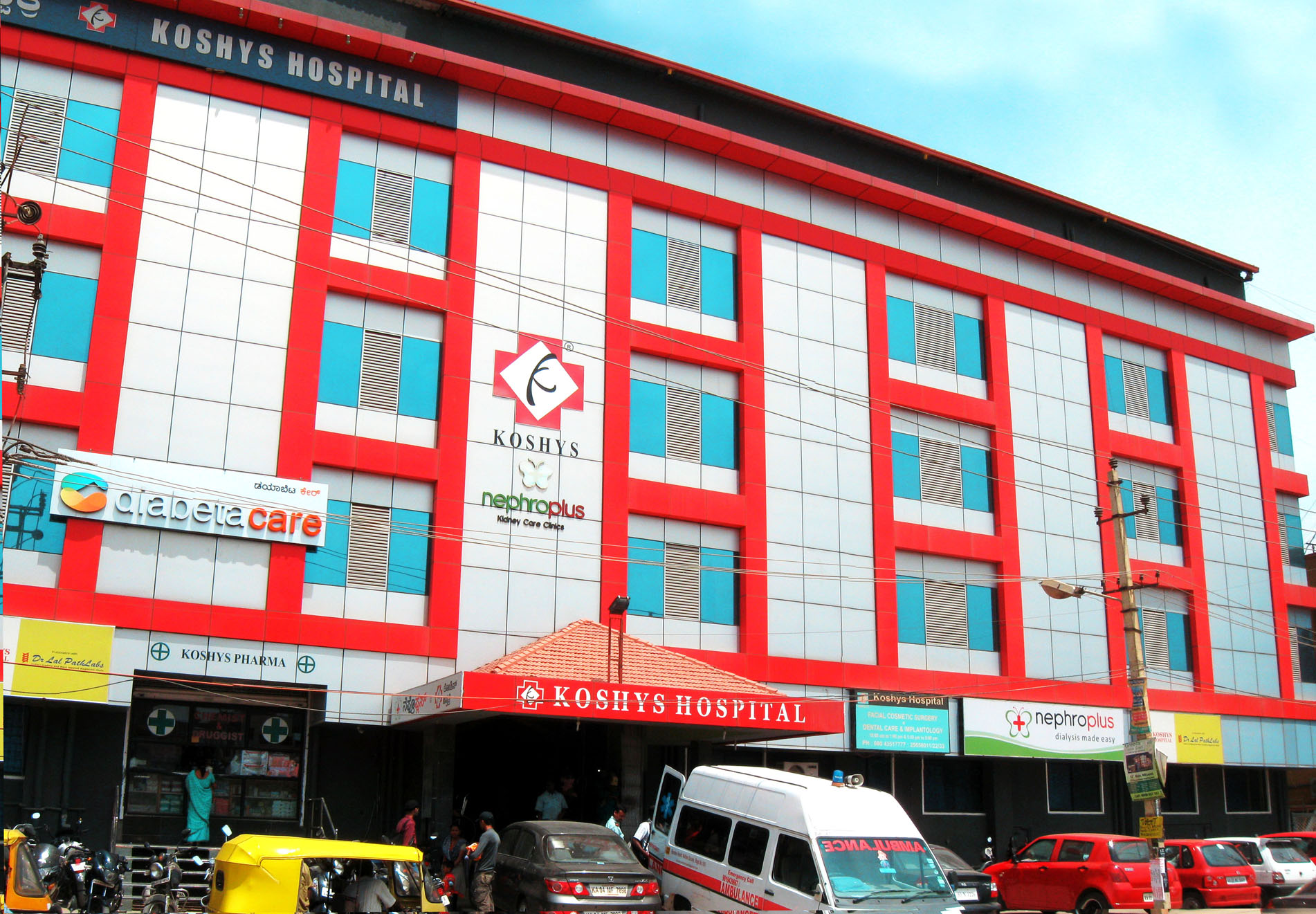
Koshys Hospital

Ramamurthy Nagar has a wide range of medical specialties practiced through these prominent hospitals:

Hospital Name	Location	Specialty
Koshy's Hospital	Raghavendra Nagar, T.C. Palya Road Contact:- 8951806553	Surgery
Sri Sai Eye Hospital	Dooravani Nagar, RM Nagar Main Road	Eye
Ayur Vaid Hospital	Hoysala Nagar, T.C. Palya Road	Ayurvedic
Jyothsna Hospital (Closed)	Akshay nagar, T.C. Palya Road	General hospital
