= K. R. Pura Assembly constituency =

Constituency of the Karnataka legislative assembly in India

Coordinates: 12°58′N 77°34′E

K. R. Pura
- Constituency No. 151 for the Karnataka Legislative Assembly
- Location of K. R. Puram Assembly constituency, shown in red, in Bangalore

Constituency details
- Country: India
- Region: South India
- State: Karnataka
- District: Bangalore Urban
- Lok Sabha constituency: Bangalore North
- Established: 2008
- Total electors: 510,777 (2023)
- Reservation: None

Member of Legislative Assembly
- 16th Karnataka Legislative Assembly
- Incumbent Byrati Basavaraj
- Party: Bharatiya Janata Party
- Elected year: 2023
- Preceded by: N. S. Nandiesha Reddy

K. R. Pura constituency

K. R. Pura Assembly constituency (also known as Krishnarajapura) is an Assembly constituency in the Greater Bangalore region and has the largest number of voters among the 21 constituencies. It comes under Bangalore North Lok Sabha constituency. Carved out from the erstwhile Varthur Assembly constituency, and a few parts of Hosakote Assembly constituency, it has predominantly urban characteristics.

== Ward map ==
All wards of the erstwhile K. R. Pura City Municipal Council, and wards 3 to 11 of Mahadevapura City Municipal Council, which includes Sanna Thammanahalli, Medahalli, Bhattrahalli, K. R. Pura, Ramamurthy Nagar, Doorvaninagar, Chikkabasavanapura, Devasandra, Vijnanapura, A. Narayanapura, Singayyanapalya, Annayyanapalya, Mahadevapura, Benniganahalli, Vibhuthipura and Vimanapura now come under K R Pura Assembly.

As many as 11 villages, K. Narayanapura, Kottanur, N. Nagenahalli, Kyalasanahalli, Geddalahalli, Horamavu Agara, K. Channasandra, Kalkere, Horamavu, Babusapalya and Chalkere, that were included within the Bruhat Bangalore Mahanagara Palike limits when the Greater Bangalore area was formed, are also part of this constituency.

The area has its own set of problems. Traffic congestion, sewage disposal issues, lack of storm-water drains and bad roads are common complaints.

Following are the Wards which come under K. R. Pura Assembly constituency:

Ward No.	Ward Name	Corporator
25	Horamavu	Radhamma
26	Ramamurthy Nagar	Padmavathi S.
51	Vijnanapura	S Raju
52	K. R. Pura	K Poornima
53	Basavanpura	B N Jayaprakash
55	Devasandra	M N Srikanth
56	A. Narayanapura	V Suresh
81	Vignana Nagar	S G Nagaraj
87	HAL Airport	N Manjunath

== Civic administration ==
K R Pura comes under Bangalore North (Lok Sabha constituency) led by MP D. V. Sadananda Gowda who was also the ex Chief Minister of Karnataka. During the general elections 2014 D. V. Sadananda Gowda contesting through BJP won with 52.91% majority defeating C. Narayanaswamy of INC. MLA Byrati Basavaraj won contesting through INC the 2013 Karnataka Legislative Assembly election from K R Pura by a margin of 24001 votes defeating N. S. Nandiesha Reddy of BJP.

== Members of the Legislative Assembly ==
Election	Member	Party
2008	N. S. Nandiesha Reddy	Bharatiya Janata Party
2013	Byrati Basavaraj	Indian National Congress
2018	Byrati Basavaraj	Indian National Congress
2019 By-election	Byrati Basavaraj	Bharatiya Janata Party
2023	Byrati Basavaraj	Bharatiya Janata Party

== Election results ==
=== Assembly Election 2023 ===
2023 Karnataka Legislative Assembly election : K. R. Pura
Party	Candidate	Votes	%	±%
BJP	Byrati Basavaraj	139,925	51.93%	▼10.93
INC	D. K. Mohan	115,624	42.91%	▲8.56
NOTA	None of the above	4,396	1.63%	▼0.70
AAP	Dr. J. S. Keshava Kumar	2,319	0.86%	New
UPP	Madesha. N	2,215	0.82%	▲0.09
JD(S)	C. Venkatachalapathi	1,975	0.73%	▼0.19
Margin of victory		24,301	9.02%	▼19.49
Turnout		269,589	52.78%	▲6.13
Total valid votes		269,462		
Registered electors		510,777		▲4.66
BJP hold		Swing	▼10.93	

=== Assembly By-election 2019 ===
2019 Karnataka Legislative Assembly by-election : K. R. Pura
Party	Candidate	Votes	%	±%
BJP	Byrati Basavaraj	139,879	62.86%	▲22.44
INC	M. Narayanaswamy	76,436	34.35%	▼18.96
NOTA	None of the above	5,184	2.33%	▲1.36
JD(S)	C. Krishnamurthy	2,048	0.92%	▼1.67
UPP	Santhosh. M	1,620	0.73%	New
Margin of victory		63,443	28.51%	▲15.62
Turnout		227,644	46.65%	▼7.93
Total valid votes		222,518		
Registered electors		488,012		▲4.83
BJP gain from INC		Swing	▲9.55	

=== Assembly Election 2018 ===
2018 Karnataka Legislative Assembly election : K. R. Pura
Party	Candidate	Votes	%	±%
INC	Byrati Basavaraj	135,404	53.31%	▲2.28
BJP	N. S. Nandiesha Reddy	102,675	40.42%	▲0.91
JD(S)	D. A. Gopala	6,578	2.59%	▲0.69
NOTA	None of the above	2,464	0.97%	New
Margin of victory		32,729	12.89%	▲1.37
Turnout		254,064	54.58%	▼4.33
Total valid votes		253,994		
Registered electors		465,508		▲36.97
INC hold		Swing	▲2.28	

=== Assembly Election 2013 ===
2013 Karnataka Legislative Assembly election : K. R. Pura
Party	Candidate	Votes	%	±%
INC	Byrati Basavaraj	106,299	51.03%	▲9.01
BJP	N. S. Nandiesha Reddy	82,298	39.51%	▼9.72
JD(S)	Ravi Prakash. J	3,955	1.90%	▼2.73
CPI(M)	Gowramma	1,553	0.75%	▼0.63
Margin of victory		24,001	11.52%	▲4.31
Turnout		200,229	58.91%	▲15.85
Total valid votes		208,322		
Registered electors		339,866		▲7.95
INC gain from BJP		Swing	▲1.80	

=== Assembly Election 2008 ===
2008 Karnataka Legislative Assembly election : K. R. Pura
Party	Candidate	Votes	%	±%
BJP	N. S. Nandiesha Reddy	66,741	49.23%	New
INC	A. Krishnappa	56,971	42.02%	New
JD(S)	L. Muniswamy	6,280	4.63%	New
CPI(M)	Gowramma	1,866	1.38%	New
BSP	T. J. Abraham	1,410	1.04%	New
Margin of victory		9,770	7.21%	
Turnout		135,581	43.06%	
Total valid votes		135,578		
Registered electors		314,832		
BJP win (new seat)				

== See also ==
- List of constituencies of the Karnataka Legislative Assembly
- Bangalore Urban district
