= Kammanahalli =

Kammanahalli Kammanahaḷḷi
- Neighbourhood
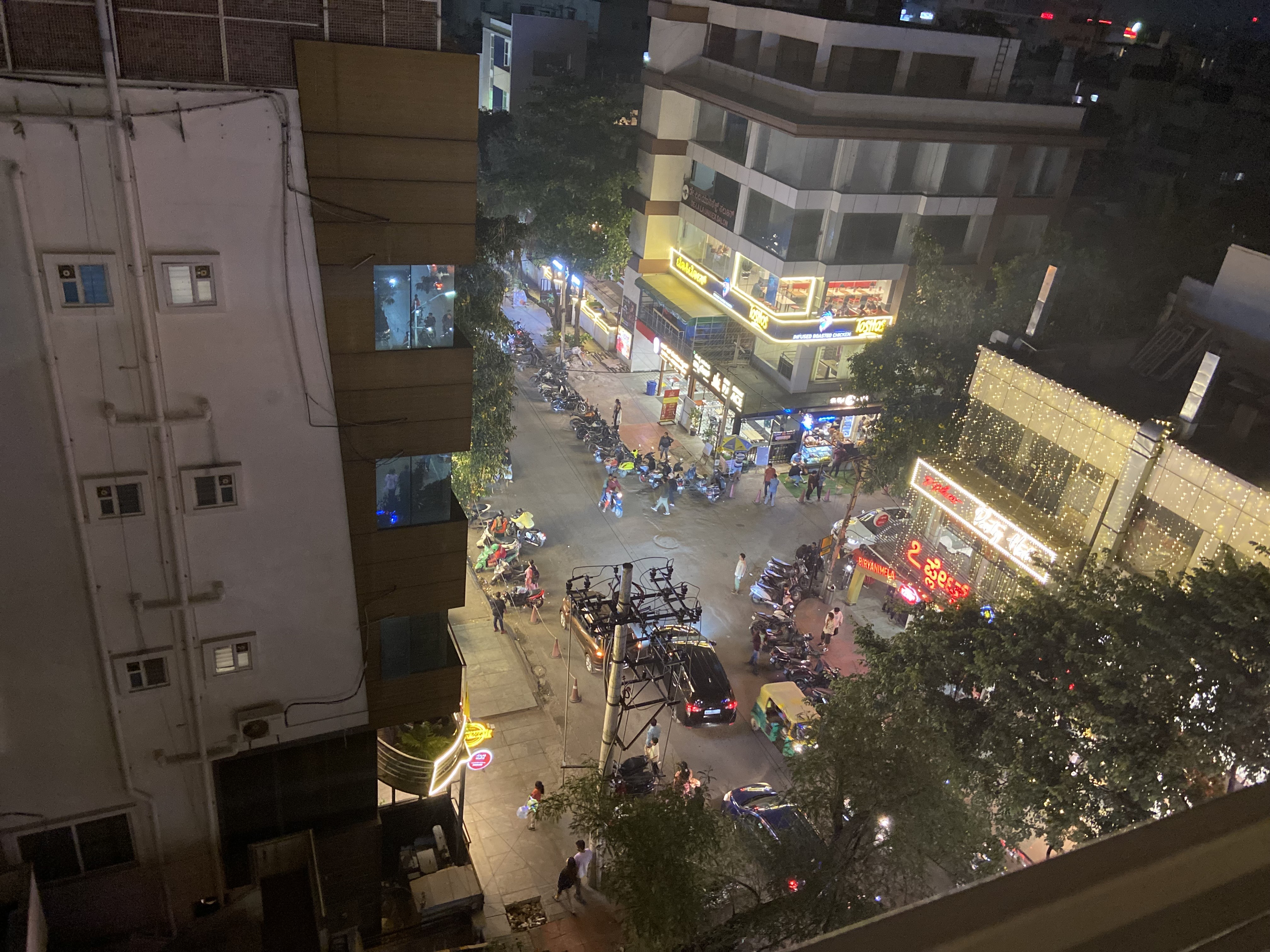
- Country: India
- State: Karnataka
- Metro: Bangalore

Area
  - Total: 1.92 km^{2} (0.74 sq mi)

Population
  - Total: 68,058
  - Density: 35,400/km^{2} (91,800/sq mi)

Languages
  - Official: Kannada
- Time zone: UTC+5:30 (IST)
- PIN: 560084

Kammanahalli (ISO: Kammanahaḷḷi) is a locality located in the north-eastern part of the Indian city of Bengaluru, Karnataka. It is bound by Kalyan Nagar, Banaswadi, HRBR Layout, HBR Layout, Maruthi Seva Nagar, Jeevanahalli, Hennur and Lingarajapuram.

== Etymology ==
Etymology of Kammanahalli (lit. 'Kamma's village' in Kannada) is debated, with popular consensus of Kamma or Kamme being the word for irrigation channel in Kannada, reflecting the region's history of being a vast farmland fed by water cannals. The other part of the word Haḷḷi means village in Kannada. Thus, Kammanahalli transliterates to 'Village by the Cannal'.

== Demographics and culture ==
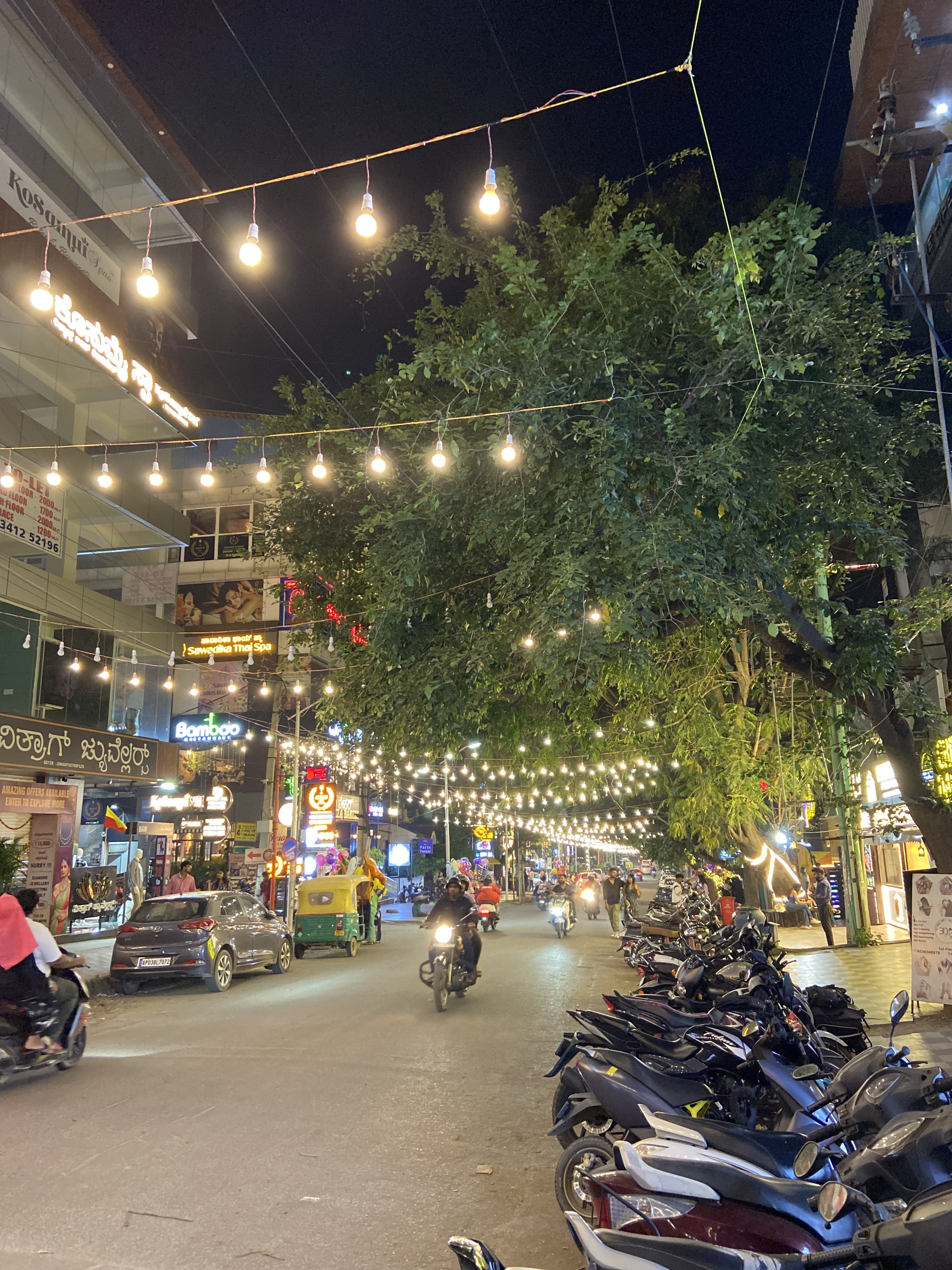
5th Main Road in Kammanahalli, HRBR Layout

The locality is home to one of the most religiously and ethnically diverse communities, with multiple churches, temples, and mosques side-by-side, hence earning the nickname "Kamanhattan". In Kammanahalli one can find diverse Indian communities as well as thriving communities of Africans, Arabs, Koreans and Russians. Kammanahalli is considered as a bustling cosmopolis with multiple retail shops, malls, residential areas, eateries, pubs, bars, and activities.

== Connectivity ==
The close proximity to the SMVT railway station, Banaswadi railway station, Swami Vivekananda Road metro station of the Namma Metro Purple Line and the upcoming Kalyan Nagar metro station of the Blue Line has resulted into skyrocketing real estate prices in the neighborhood. Kammanahalli is well connected to the Kempegowda International Airport, which lies roughly just around 30 kilometres away. Sub-localities within the area include Ramaswamipalya (RS Palya), Munikalappa Garden Layout, Subbannaiahpalya, Jalvayu Vihar, Kacharakanahalli, St. Thomas Town and Kullappa Circle.
