= Kasturinagara metro station =

Upcoming Namma Metro station under Blue Line

Kasturi Nagar
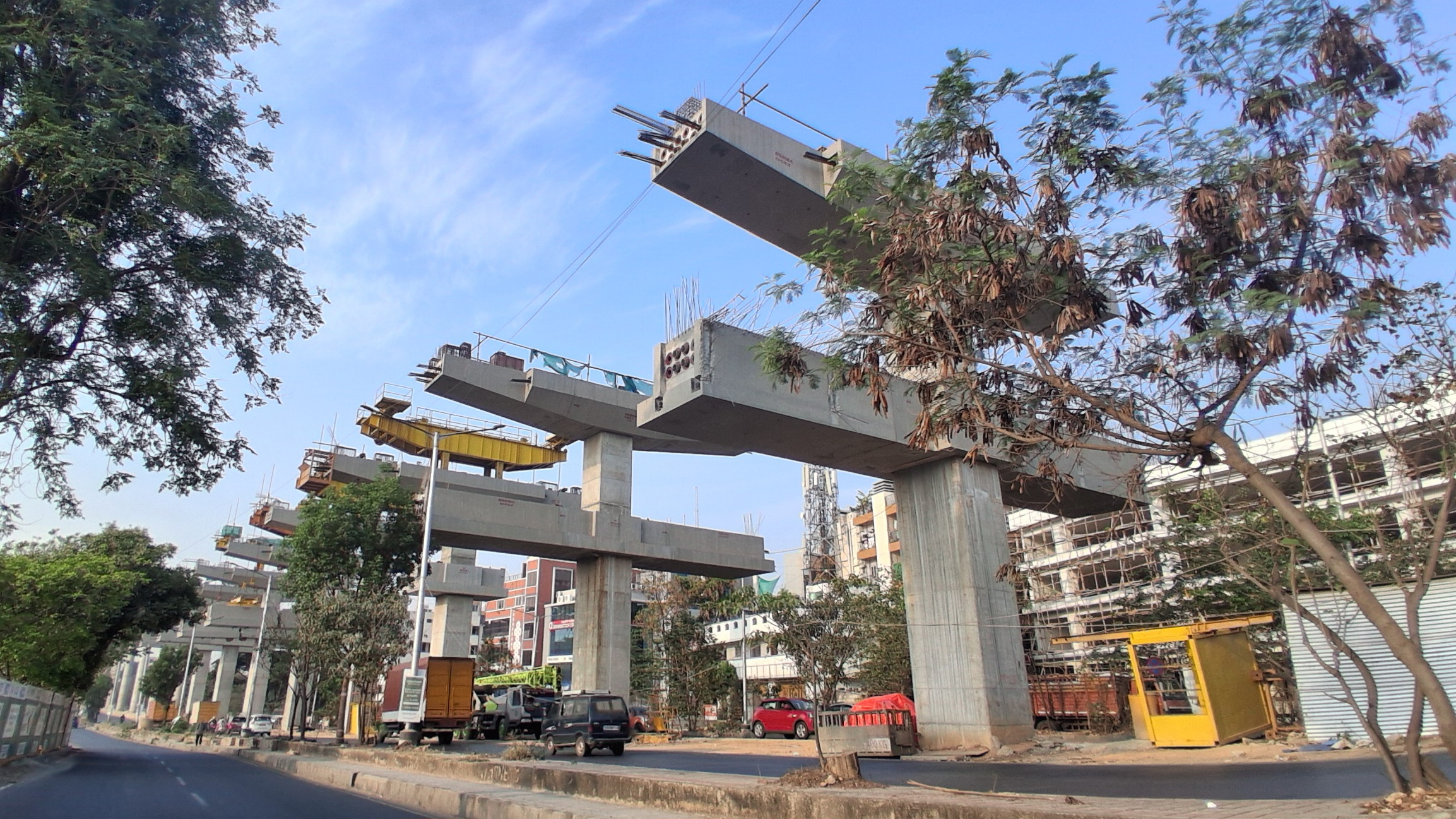
- Under Construction of this metro station under Phase 2B of Namma Metro's Blue Line as of April 2026

General information
- Other names: Kasturinagara
- Location: NH 44, Jyothi Puram, Kasturinagara, Bengaluru, Karnataka 560043
- Coordinates: 13.00485°N 77.66318°E
- System: Namma Metro station
- Owner: Bangalore Metro Rail Corporation Ltd (BMRCL)
- Operator: Namma Metro
- Line: Blue Line
- Platforms: Side platform (TBC); Platform-1 → Krishnarajapura / Central Silk Board; Platform-2 → KIAL Terminals; Platform Numbers (TBC)
- Tracks: 2 (TBC)
- Connections: Channasandra; Kasthuri Nagar

Construction
- Structure type: Elevated, Double track
- Platform levels: 2 (TBC)
- Parking: (TBC)
- Accessible: (TBC)

Other information
- Status: Under Construction
- Station code: (TBC)

History
- Opening: December 2027; 15 months' time (TBC)
- Electrified: (TBC)

Services
| Preceding station | Namma Metro | Following station |
|---|---|---|
| Krishnarajapura towards Krishnarajapura or Central Silk Board | Blue Line (Future Service) | Horamavu towards KIAL Terminals |
Route map
Location

Kasturi Nagar is an upcoming elevated metro station on the North-South corridor of the Blue Line of Namma Metro in Bangalore, India. It is located in the main Kasturinagar area consisting of residential buildings, followed by the main Channasandra railway station, RTO Office (Kasturinagar), Steel Authority of India (SAIL) (Kasturinagar) and Banasawadi Police Station. This metro station is slated to become operational around June 2026.

== History ==
On November 17 2020, the Bangalore Metro Rail Corporation Limited (BMRCL) invited bids for the construction of the Kasturi Nagar metro station, part of the 11 km Reach 2B – Package 1 (Krishnarajapura - Kempapura) of the 37.692 km Blue Line of Namma Metro. On September 14 2021, Nagarjuna Construction Company Ltd. (NCC Ltd.) was chosen as the lowest bidder for this segment, with their proposal closely matching the initial cost estimates. As a result, the contract was awarded to the company, which led to the beginning of the construction works of this metro station as per the agreed terms.

== Station layout ==
Station Layout - To Be Confirmed

| G | Street level | Exit/Entrance |
| L1 | Mezzanine | Fare control, station agent, Metro Card vending machines, crossover |
| L2 | Side platform | Doors will open on the left |
| L2 | Platform # Southbound | Towards → Central Silk Board; Next Station: Krishnarajapura; Change at the next station for Purple Line |
| L2 | Platform # Northbound | Towards ← Hebbala / KIAL Terminals; Next Station: Horamavu |
| L2 | Side platform | Doors will open on the left |
| L2 |

== Connections ==
This metro station will be connected with Channasandra of Indian Railways network and also will be connected with the Kasthuri Nagar bus stop leading towards Tin Factory or towards Horamavu.

== See also ==
- Bangalore
- List of Namma Metro stations
- Transport in Karnataka
- List of metro systems
- List of rapid transit systems in India
- Bangalore Metropolitan Transport Corporation
