= N. S. Nandiesha Reddy =

Indian politician

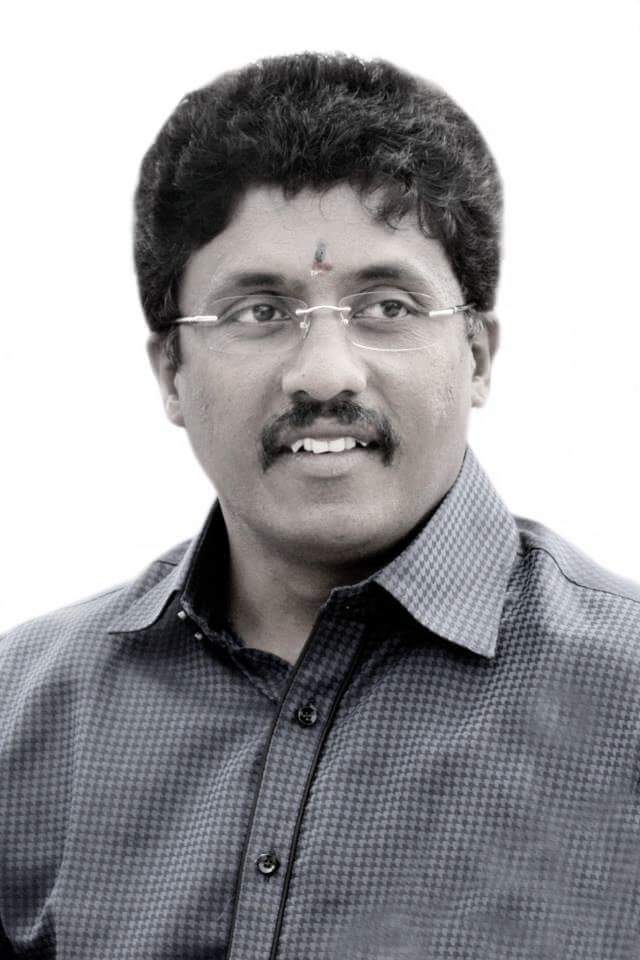

Party Secretary of Karnataka BJP since 2005

Ex-Member of the Legislative Assembly (India) of Krishnarajapuram constituency, Karnataka
- In office 2008-2013
- Preceded by: B. A. Basavaraja
- Succeeded by: A.Krishnappa
- Constituency: Krishnarajapuram

Personal details
- Born: 6 July 1971 (age 55) Karnataka, India
- Party: Bharatiya Janata Party
- Children: 3 Children
- Website: www.nandiesha.com

== Early life ==
Nandiesha Reddy comes from a family of farmers. His Father was Late Kote Srinivasa Reddy. Kote Family have been landlords. Sri Nandiesha Reddy is into Seri-culture and Agriculture in Bangarpet Taluk, Kolar District.

== Personal Details ==
Kote N S Nandiesha Reddy his formal induction in social service started with Rashtriya Swayamsevak Sangh (RSS), a socio-cultural organization, dedicated to the service of the Nation. While serving in the RSS for about Two decades, He was working very actively in the youth wing of BJP (ABVP) in his college days and he also actively participated in and pursued mainstream politics. He began his political career as a youth leader in 1999 and active member of the BJP since then. He got a chance to work with Senior leaders at grass root level from the year 2001 and worked for Party in Zilla Panchayath, Taluk Panchayath & Legislative Council Elections for the Bengaluru Area. In consideration of his contribution, the Party appointed him as in-charge of Varthur Constituency for the 2004 elections. In 2008 he was awarded with BJP ticket to contest from the K R Puram Assembly Constituency, in which he won by defeating Former Minister Shri A Krishnappa.

As MLA, he has worked towards the development of the Constituency by solving public grievances on priority and by interacting with the public through social media and also at a personal level, with the main agenda to resolve issues like water, roads and sewage and was able to achieve success during his tenure.

In the 2013 state assembly elections Reddy lost to B.A. Basavaraja of the Indian National Congress by a considerable margin. For the 2018 Karnataka state assembly elections, Reddy will be facing a tough battle against B.A Basavaraja of INC.
