= Tin Factory junction =

Road junction in Bangalore, India

The Tin Factory junction is a road junction in Bangalore, India. Located near Krishnarajapuram railway station on Old Madras Road, the junction witnesses high traffic congestion and is one of the worst traffic bottlenecks in the city. The junction connects the Outer Ring Road IT cluster of Mahadevapura–Marathahalli–Bellandur with areas along the National Highway 44 such as Hebbal.

In 2018, Bangalore Traffic Police installed a traffic signal at the junction in order to ensure free vehicular movement. In 2019, Government of Karnataka announced that a flyover would be constructed at the junction which would connect the Outer Ring Road cable bridge with Benniganahalli Flyover. In November 2019, a 17-kilometer BMTC priority bus lane was inaugurated between Tin Factory junction and Silk Board junction.

A Namma Metro station, named Benniganahalli, at Tin Factory junction has been constructed on the Purple Line. A plan to build a double-decked Metro-cum-flyover corridor at the junction was dropped, after BMRCL found the proposal to be infeasible.
