= Damro =

Sri Lankan furniture manufacturing company

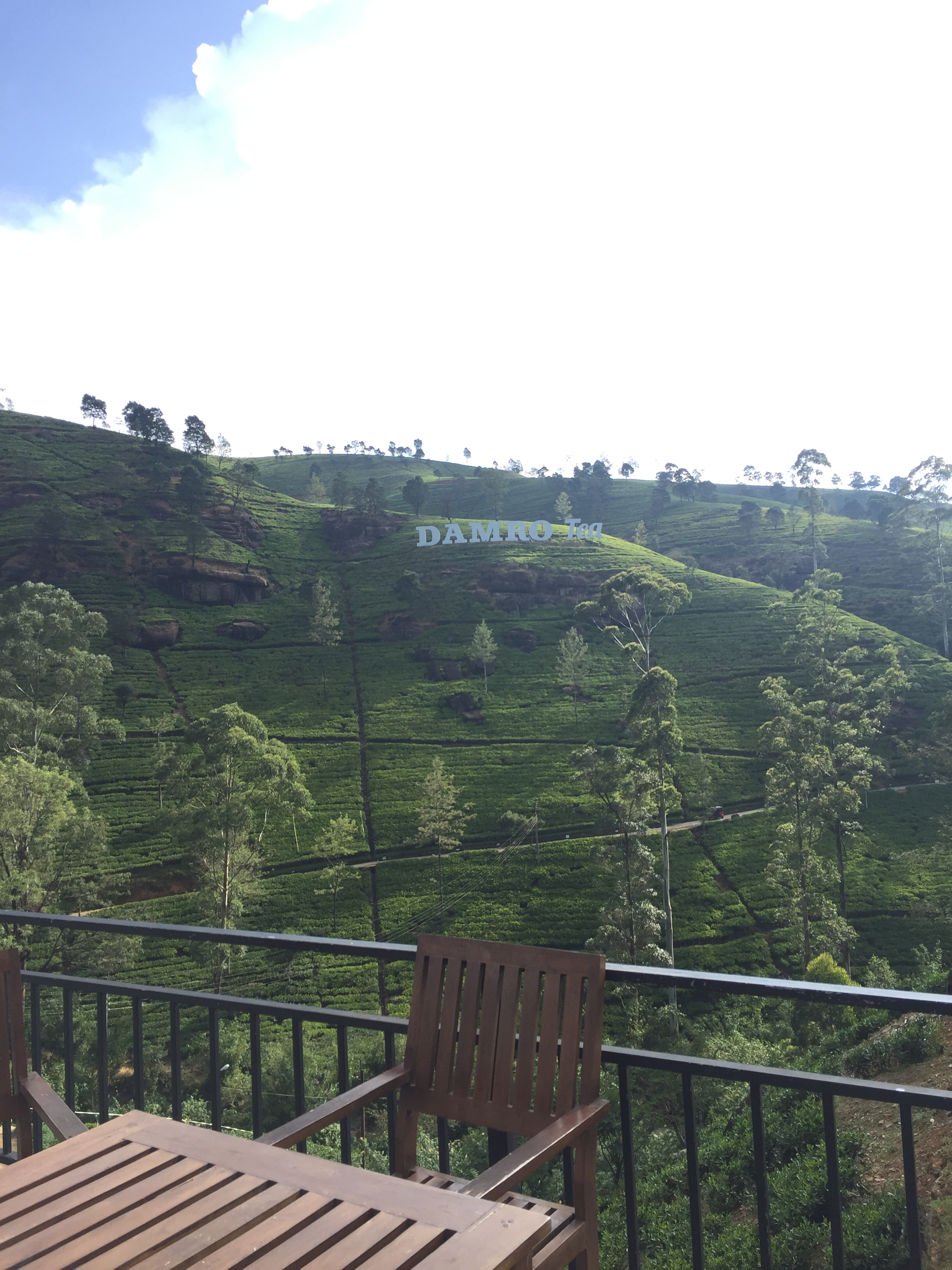
- Damro tea sign in Labookellie estate
- Type: Private
- Industry: Retail
- Founded: 1986
- Headquarters: Sri Lanka
- Area served: Sri Lanka; India
- Products: Furniture; Homeware; Electronic appliances; Tea products
- Website: damro.lk

Damro is a Sri Lankan furniture and washing machine manufacturer that designs and sells diverse range of modern and traditional furniture. Damro is regarded as the largest furniture manufacturer in South Asia and it is also regarded as one of the world's largest furniture manufacturers. It is also hailed as a popular lifestyle brand.

The company was founded in 1986. The company initially started its operations foraying into manufacturing steel chairs and later it diversified its operations into plastic and wooden furniture. As of 2022, the company has over 175 showrooms in Sri Lanka and 100 showrooms in India. The company is estimated to have around 275 showrooms globally.

In October 2000, the company became the first Sri Lankan furniture manufacturer to exploit the opportunity of setting up its first overseas store in India's Chennai mainly due to the Indo-Lanka Free Trade Agreement. Damro also cashed in the opportunity of tariff concessions due to the India-Sri Lanka Free Trade Agreement. It is also touted to be the first Sri Lankan firm to be established in India ever since the India-Sri Lanka Free Trade Agreement came into effect.

The brand is also widely acclaimed in India as one of the most sought-after foreign brands. The company has a widespread showroom network in India catering to ten states and operates in various big cities such as Chennai, Lucknow and Hyderabad.

In March 2017, Damro ventured into the plantation management with the acquisition of the controlling stake of Pussellawa Plantations Ltd and Agalawatte Plantations PLC.

In 2017, Damro Group roped in television and film actress Yashoda Wimaladharma as its first ever brand ambassador. In the same year, Damro Group officially announced that it would also sell electronic home appliances including refrigerators, air conditioners, and television sets under the flagship brand Damro.

In July 2018, Damro Group officially opened up the Marino Mall and Beach Hotel in Kollupitiya with an investment of 12.5 billion. The construction of Marino Mall commenced in June 2013 and Damro Group owns the mall.

In 2021, Damro opened its 100th showroom in India in Kolkata and continued its intention of expanding its retail brand across all parts of India.
