= Kalyan Nagar =

Neighbourhood of Bangalore, India

Kalyan Nagar is a neighbourhood in the eastern part of Bangalore, Karnataka. It is located near Banaswadi and Horamavu. Hennur Road passes through Kalyan Nagar. It consists of HRBR Layout and Chelekere.
