= Baiyyappanahalli (disambiguation) =

Baiyyappanahalli may refer to:

- Baiyyappanahalli or New Baiyyappanahalli, a neighborhood in Bangalore.
  - Baiyyappanahalli railway station, a railway station in Baiyyappanahalli, Bangalore.
  - Sir M. Visvesvaraya Terminal, (a.k.a. Baiyyappanahalli Terminal railway station) a Terminal railway station in Baiyyappanahalli, Bangalore.
  - Baiyappanahalli metro station, a metro station in Baiyyappanahalli, Bangalore.
- Baiyyappanahalli Manavarthe Kaval or Old Baiyyappanahalli, former village and present neighborhood in Bangalore.
- Vimanapura, also known as Baiyyappanahalli Vimanapura, is an eastern suburb of Bangalore in Karnataka in India
- Baiyyappanahalli, Bangalore East, a village in Bangalore East Taluk, Bangalore Urban district
- Baiyyappanahalli, Bangalore North, a village in Bangalore North Taluk, Bangalore Urban district
- Baiyyappanahalli, Doddaballapur, a village in Doddaballapur Taluk, Bangalore Rural district
- Baiyyappanahalli, Kolar, a village in Kolar Taluk, Kolar district
- Baiyyappanahalli, Malur, a village in Malur Taluk, Kolar district
- Baiyyappanahalli, Chikkaballapur, a village in Chikkaballapur Taluk, Chikkaballapur district
- Baiyyappanahalli, Sidlaghatta, a village in Sidlaghatta Taluk, Chikkaballapur district
