= Banaswadi =

Banaswadi Baṇasawaḍi
- Neighbourhood
- Location within Bengaluru
- Coordinates: 13.015°N 77.652°E
- Country: India
- State: Karnataka
- District: Bengaluru Urban

Government
  - Body: BBMP

Area
  - Total: 3.46 km^{2} (1.34 sq mi)

Population (2012)
  - Total: 46,142
  - Density: 13,300/km^{2} (34,500/sq mi)

Languages
  - Official: Kannada
- Time zone: UTC+5:30 (IST)
- PIN: 560043
- Area code: 91-80
- Vehicle registration: KA 53

Banaswadi (ISO: Baṇasawaḍi) is a locality situated in northeastern Bengaluru, about 6 km from the city centre on the outskirts of northeastern Bengaluru, bounded by Lingarajapuram, Hebbal, Nagawara, Thanisandra, Krishnarajapuram, Benniganahalli, Baiyyappanahalli and Maruthi Sevanagar. It is Ward no 27 of the BBMP and is further divided into two regions; Chikka Banaswadi and Dodda Banaswadi. Historically the area was known as primarily residential; little more than a village on the city outskirts; however the ongoing expansion of the city limits, the proximity of the locality to the international airport and the arrival of the outer ring road connecting Banaswadi to the city's IT hubs has seen the rapid improvement of the area and the growth of commercial and business activities.

== Localities in the ward 27 ==
Localities in the ward: HRBR Layout 1st and 2nd (P) blocks, PNS Layout, Subbayya palya extension, Chowdeshwari Layout, Jai Jawan Nagar, Yerra Reddy Layout, Ex-Servicemen colony, Ramaiah Layout, Banaswadi, Dodda Banaswadi, Erappa Reddy Layout, Annaiah Reddy Layout, Vijaya Bank colony, and OMBR Layout.

== Demographics ==
The population of Banaswadi has grown by approximately 44% since 2001, adding 14,144 people. Based on 2001 Census data, 10.6% of the population are Scheduled Castes, whilst less than 1% are Scheduled Tribes.

== Location ==
Banaswadi is located at the outskirts of Northeastern Bengaluru. It is served by Banaswadi railway station, Sir M. Visvesvaraya Terminal and Baiyyappanahalli railway station. Nearest Namma Metro stations are Swami Vivekananda Road, Baiyappanahalli and Benniganahalli on the Purple Line.

The Banaswadi Anjaneya temple in the locality is popular and it is believed that on the day of Hanuman Jayanti, the eye of the deity in stone secretes tears.
