= Hopefarm Channasandra metro station =

Namma Metro's Purple Line metro station

Hopefarm Channasandra
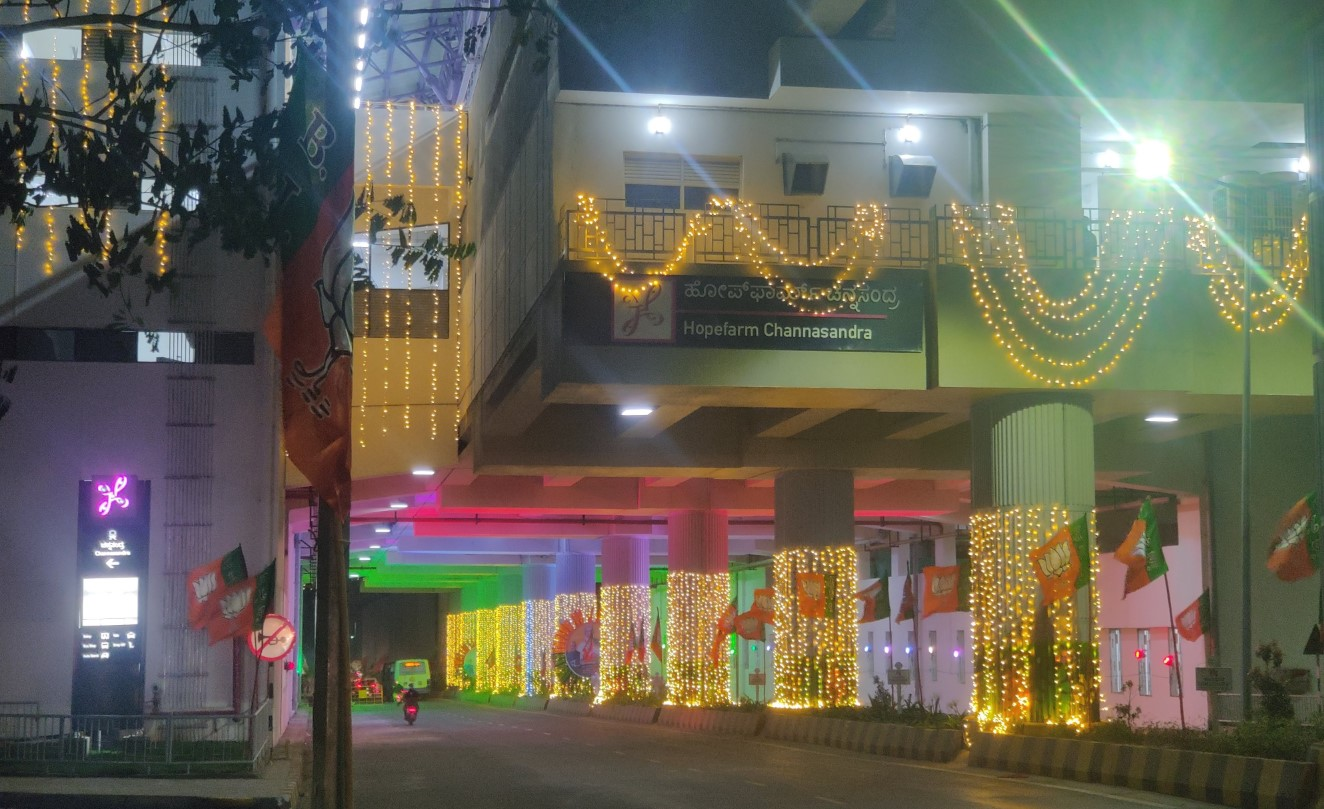
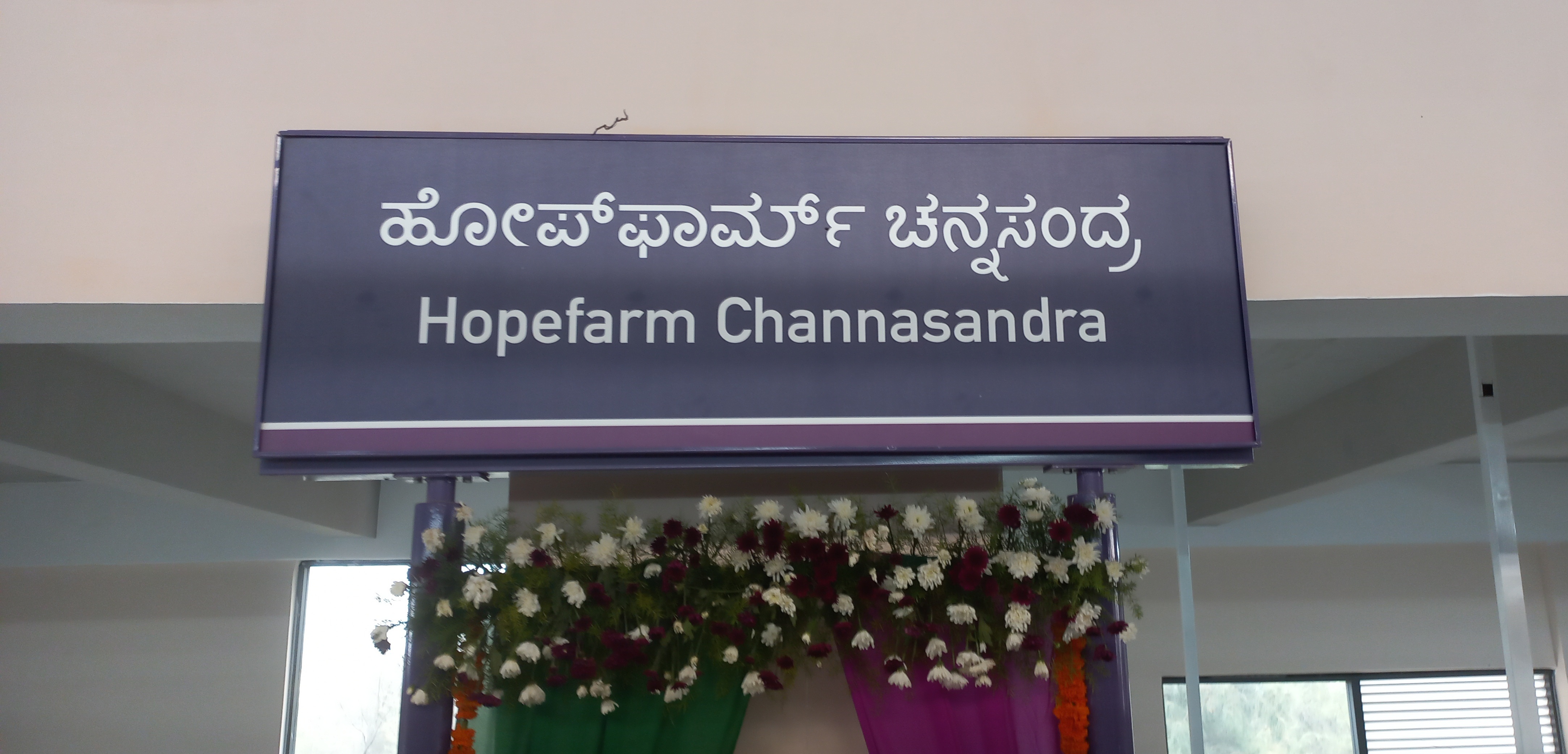

General information
- Other names: Channasandra
- Location: Whitefield Main Rd, Maithri Layout, Kadugodi, Bengaluru, Karnataka 560067
- Coordinates: 12.98793°N 77.75409°E
- System: Namma Metro station
- Owner: Bangalore Metro Rail Corporation Ltd (BMRCL)
- Operator: Namma Metro
- Line: Purple Line
- Platforms: Side platform Platform-1 → Whitefield (Kadugodi); Platform-2 → Challaghatta
- Tracks: 2

Construction
- Structure type: Elevated, Double track
- Platform levels: 2
- Parking: Two-Wheelers available
- Accessible: Yes
- Architect: ITD - ITD Cementation India JV

Other information
- Status: Staffed
- Station code: UWVL

History
- Opened: 26 March 2023; 3 years ago
- Electrified: 750 V DC third rail

Services
Preceding station	Namma Metro	Following station
Whitefield (Kadugodi) Terminus	Purple Line	Kadugodi Tree Park towards Challaghatta
Route map
Location

Hopefarm Channasandra (formerly known as Channasandra) is an elevated metro station on the East-West corridor of the Purple Line of Namma Metro in Bengaluru, India, which serves the main Channasandra neighbourhood area. This station is situated near the Whitefield metro depot, Prestige Park View apartment, a few shopping centres, and other commercial and residential establishments.

The Whitefield - Krishnarajapura trial runs were successfully conducted from 25 October for a month. This metro station was inaugurated on March 25, 2023 by Prime Minister Narendra Modi, and opened to the public on March 26, 2023.

== History ==
During the initial planning stages of Namma Metro's Purple Line, the station was planned to be named after the nearby Ujjwal Vidhyalaya, and this is still evident in its station code — UWVL. This reference can still be seen in some older media.

The station was classified under Reach 1B (covering the distance between Kundalahalli and Whitefield) of Phase 2 of Namma Metro, as a part of Reach 1 (covering the distance from Baiyappanahalli to Whitefield).

== Station layout ==
L2	Side Platform | Doors will open on the left
L2	Platform 1 Eastbound	Towards → Whitefield (Kadugodi)
L2	Platform 2 Westbound	Towards ← Challaghatta; Next Station: Kadugodi Tree Park
L2	Side Platform | Doors will open on the left
L1	Concourse	Fare control, station agent, Metro Card vending machines, crossover
G	Street level	Exit/Entrance

== Entry/Exit ==
There are 2 Entry/Exit points - A and B. Commuters can use either of the points for their travel.

- Entry/Exit point A - Towards Kadugodi Colony side
- Entry/Exit point B - Towards Kadugodi side

== See also ==
- Channasandra
- Bangalore
- List of Namma Metro stations
- Transport in Karnataka
- List of metro systems
- List of rapid transit systems in India
- Bangalore Metropolitan Transport Corporation
