= Baiyyappanahalli Manavarthe Kaval =

- neighbourhood
- Location within Bengaluru
- Coordinates: 12.991208451066024°N 77.64588451841212°E
- Country: India
- State: Karnataka
- Metro: Bengaluru

Languages
  - Official: Kannada, English
- Time zone: UTC+5:30 (IST)
- PIN: 560038

Baiyyappanahalli Manavarthe Kaval or Old Baiyyappanahalli is one of the early settlements in Bengaluru. It is part of C. V. Raman Nagar Assembly constituency in East Bengaluru. This former village was included in the Bangalore Mahanagara Palike on 7 December 1995.

== History ==
This village populated with 2742 inhabitants (1429 Male and 1313 Female) in 1981 and was considered as uninhabited during 1991 Census. It was merged with Vimanapura (which was then called as Baiyyappanahalli Vimanapura) which hosted 11441 citizens (6157 Male and 5284 Female) in 1981. Baiyyappanahalli NMCT (Non Municipal Census Town) consisted of Baiyyappanahalli Manavarthe Kaval, Benniganahalli and Baiyyappanahalli Vimanapura and was a home to 14905 persons (7873 Male and 7032 Female) during 1991 Census.

In January 2007, the Karnataka Government issued a notification to merge the areas under then Bangalore Mahanagara Palike with seven City municipal council (CMC)'s, one Town municipal council (TMC) and 110 villages around the city (including Baiyyappanahalli NMCT) to form a single administrative body, Bruhat Bengaluru Mahanagara Palike. The process was completed by April 2007 and the body was renamed Bruhat Bengaluru Mahanagara Palike (Greater Bangalore Municipal Corporation).

Population details
Village Name	Area in Hectares (1961)	1971	Population (1961)	1971	1981	1991	2001	2011
Baiyyappanahalli Vimanapura	387	156.64	1619	2361	11441			
Baiyyappanahalli Manavarthe Kaval	257	93.26	-	4450	2742			
Benniganahalli		779	1180	2795	5772			
Baiyyappanahalli (NMCT)						14905	16360	BBMP

== Transport ==
This locality is adjacent to Baiyappanahalli, a transport hub hosting Baiyappanahalli metro station, Baiyappanahalli also hosts the Coaching depot for Metro service. Baiyyappanahalli railway station and Third coaching Terminal of Indian Railways, train station being built at the same space where Baiyyappanahalli Yard once stood.
