= Belandur Road railway station =

Railway station in Bangalore, India

Belandur Road
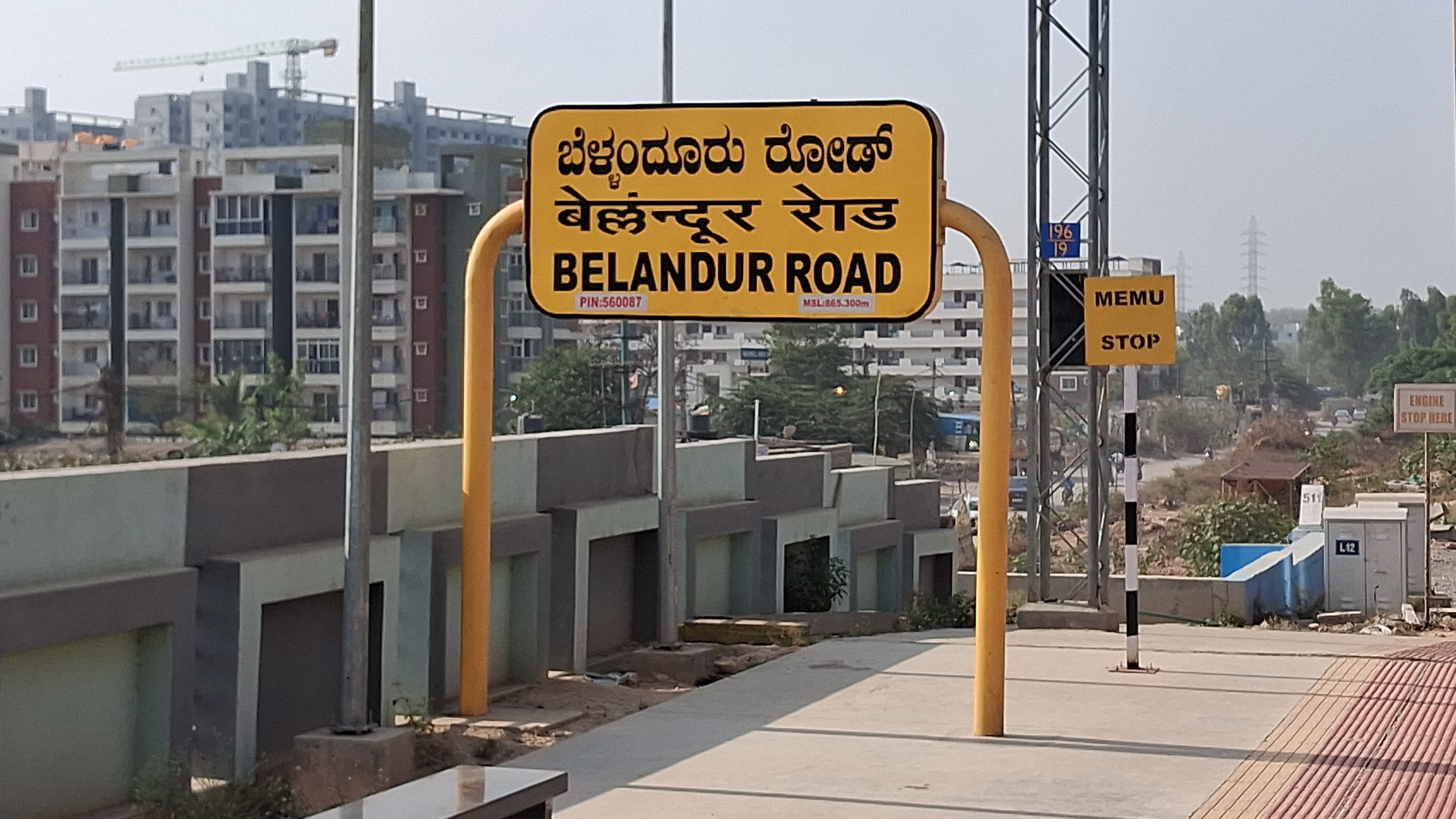
- Newly re-developed railway station board as of May 2026

General information
- Location: Panathur, Bengaluru - 560103; India
- Coordinates: 12.93724°N 77.70730°E
- Elevation: 875 metres (2,871 ft)
- System: Indian Railways station
- Owner: Indian Railways
- Operator: South Western Railway
- Line: Baiyappanahalli–Omalur Junction section
- Platforms: 2
- Tracks: 5

Construction
- Structure type: At Grade
- Parking: Yes
- Cycle facilities: Yes

Other information
- Status: Active
- Station code: BLRR
- Fare zone: South Western Railway

History
- Opened: 1864; 162 years ago

Services
Preceding station	Indian Railways	Following station
Baiyyappanahalli towards Banaswadi or Bengaluru City	Salem Junction–Bangalore City line Baiyappanahalli–Omalur Junction section	Karmelaram towards Hosur or Salem Junction
Banaswadi towards Yesvantpur Junction	Salem Junction–Bangalore City line Baiyappanahalli–Omalur Junction section	Karmelaram towards Hosur or Salem Junction
Route map
Location

Belandur Road railway station (station code: BLRR) is an Indian Railways train station located in Panathur, Bengaluru, in the Indian state of Karnataka, which is about 10 km away from the Krishnarajapuram railway station and serves the Bellandur and Panathur areas.

A major use of the station is local passenger service for travellers to the city (Bengaluru City), Karmelaram and Hosur, an industrial city in Tamil Nadu.

== History ==
Opened in 1864, this station used to be a halt station with very few facilities and there was no accessibility during that period. It served the nearby villages and its surrounding areas.

But as the Outer Ring Road IT Corridor developed rapidly through the 2000s and 2010s, the station's importance gradually increased, with more people relying on it for suburban travel. Despite the rise in demand, it continued to have very basic infrastructure.

After 2018, the station underwent a complete renovation, converting a rural halt to a new busy important suburban railway station. This consisted of electrification works, track-doubling, and addition of a new platform. These upgrades are part of broader efforts to expand the suburban rail connectivity.

== Structure ==
Belandur Road railway station has two platforms, each running to 650m in length, shelters, lighting, benches and a booking office.

=== Station Layout ===
G	Street level	Exit/Entrance & ticket counter
P	FOB, Side platform | P2 Doors will open on the left
P	Platform 2	Towards → Hosur / Dharmapuri; Next station: Karmelaram
P	Main Line	Towards → Hosur / Salem Junction
P	Main Line	Towards ← KSR Bengaluru / Yesvantpur Junction
P	Loop Line	Common Loop Line - Not in Operations
P	Platform 1	Towards ← KSR Bengaluru Next Station: Baiyyappanahalli; Towards ← Yesvantpur Junction Next Station: Banaswadi
P	FOB, Side platform | P1 Doors will open on the left
G	Street level	Exit/Entrance & ticket counter

== Connectivity ==
Belandur Road railway station is on the Salem-Bengaluru City line. The railway station is located between Baiyyappanahalli and Karmelaram railway station.

=== Road Connectivity ===
This railway station is reachable from Bellandur, Panathur and its surrounding areas through local roads. It is within the walking distance from BMTC bus stops like Panathuru Circle.

=== Air Connectivity ===
The nearest airport connecting this railway station is Kempegowda International Airport which is approximately 30–35 km by road.

== See also ==
- List of railway stations in India
