= NGEF =

Electrical company in India

- Type: Public (PSU) State-owned enterprise
- Industry: Electrical
- Founded: 1956
- Headquarters: Bangalore, Karnataka, India
- Products: pump sets transformers motors switchgear power electronics semi conductor devices mechanical engineering

NGEF (New Government Electrical Factory) of Karnataka in India was an ISO 9001 certified company with German collaborators and known for technology. It is taken as an example of an Indian company that declined.

== The Company ==
NGEF was incorporated as a company in 1956 in partnership with the former company AEG (Aktiengesellschaft or Allgemeine Elektricitäts-Gesellschaft Aktiengesellschaft) of Germany. It had six divisions — transformer, motors, switchgear, power electronics, semi conductor devices and mechanical engineering. NGEF was once a leader in pumps, electric motors and switch gears in Bangalore.

It manufactured pump sets, to provide continuous water supply for farms, and motors, to power the pumps, hence contributing its bit to increase agricultural production. NGEF also helped the Railways Modernisation Programme by executing seven major contracts for equipping 20 traction substations in the Central and Western Railways. It also manufactured the electrical components for the Kolkata Metro Blue Line.

== Allegations ==
There were allegations made against Ramakrishna Hegde by opposition leaders, in a case involving the transfer of shares by the NGEF company which was owned by the Karnataka state Government and run by public servant officers. In the mid-1980s the Indian Navy was to buy HDW submarines and torpedoes from AEG-T. NGEF, AEG's technical collaborator in India, was legally entitled to a commission on every AEG sale in the country. Instead it was found that AEG ended up paying bribes to public servants instead of the due commission. It was also alleged that Ramakrishna Hegde and J. H. Patel (both had been Chief Ministers of Karnataka) had joined with the NGEF administrators to deny the company the commission. An inquiry by retired judge Alvares found Commercial Director Srivathsa guilty of forging documents under orders from NGEF chairman Rao. The case was referred to the CBI who registered a FIR in March 1990. The bribes were found to have been routed to highly placed persons through Delhi-based Roger Enterprises. The COD headed by Diwakar also launched an investigation and presented a report to the Home Department in October 1996.

== Liberalisation ==
The liberalisation of Indian economic policies in the early 1990s jolted many PSUs (Public Sector Units) in India, one of them being NGEF. It took a turn for the worse by the late 1990s. By mid 2000, the Government tried to revive it but when it was not seen as viable the Government decided to privatise it and put it up for sale. But no feasible offer came forward to privatise the company and hence it was shut down. However the land owned by NGEF was deemed valuable. Ernst and Young were the consultants that managed the process of phasing out the company. While about 1,800 employees availed of the voluntary retirement scheme (VRS), 122 refused VRS. NGEF closed down in 2002 after incurring losses.

== Aftermath ==
NGEF is remembered for the land it owned, a part of it is currently a residential area called NGEF layout (located in Nagarbhavi 2nd stage) and the Baiyappanahalli metro station. The NGEF land was surveyed and the KSRTC, the BMTC and the BMRCL had sought 53 acres of the sprawling 240-acre factory campus in Baiyyappanahalli in Bangalore. BMRCL constructed its depot, (Baiyappanahalli metro station), in the land. Also, KSRTC has built one of its bus depots and BMTC has built the Baiyappanahalli bus stand in the area.

However while NGEF Ltd., Bangalore, no longer exists, its subsidiary in Hubli continues to operate. The unit NGEF (Hubli) Ltd. was set up in 1984 as a motor manufacturing unit of NGEF at Gokul industrial estate Hubli. By 1988 all Mfg, activities were fully shifted from Gokul industrial estate to Rayapur at 10 acres of developed land allotted by KIADB with 1,02,000 Sq.ft. built-up plant.

While the Hubli unit continues to make profit and is hence supported by the state government, there were talks of reviving the Bangalore unit by utilising its property and machinery. In 2009, years after NGEF was shut down, there were still some employees whose dues had not been paid yet.
