= Nagarbhavi =

Nagarabhavi Nagarbhavi
- Neighbourhood
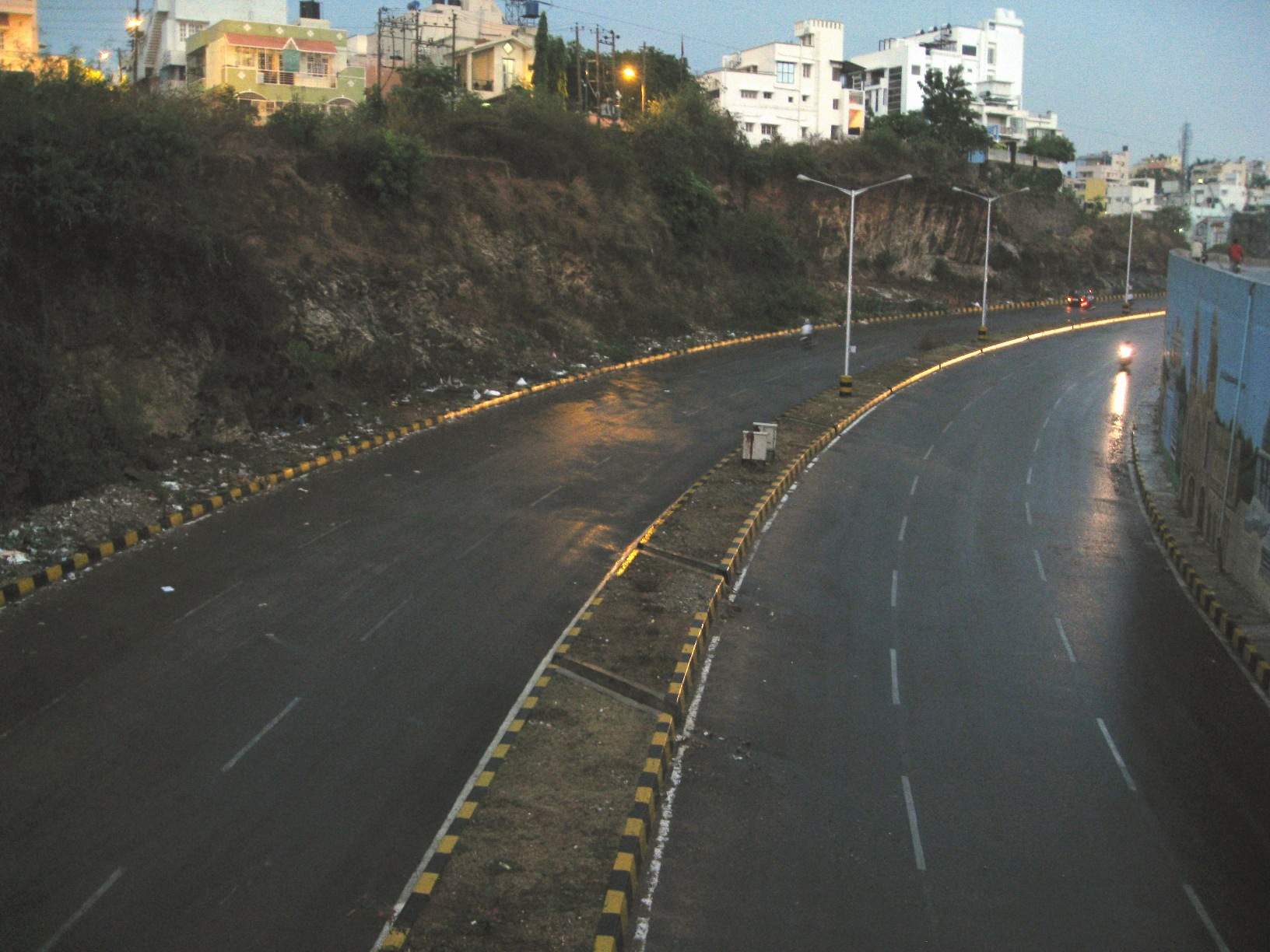
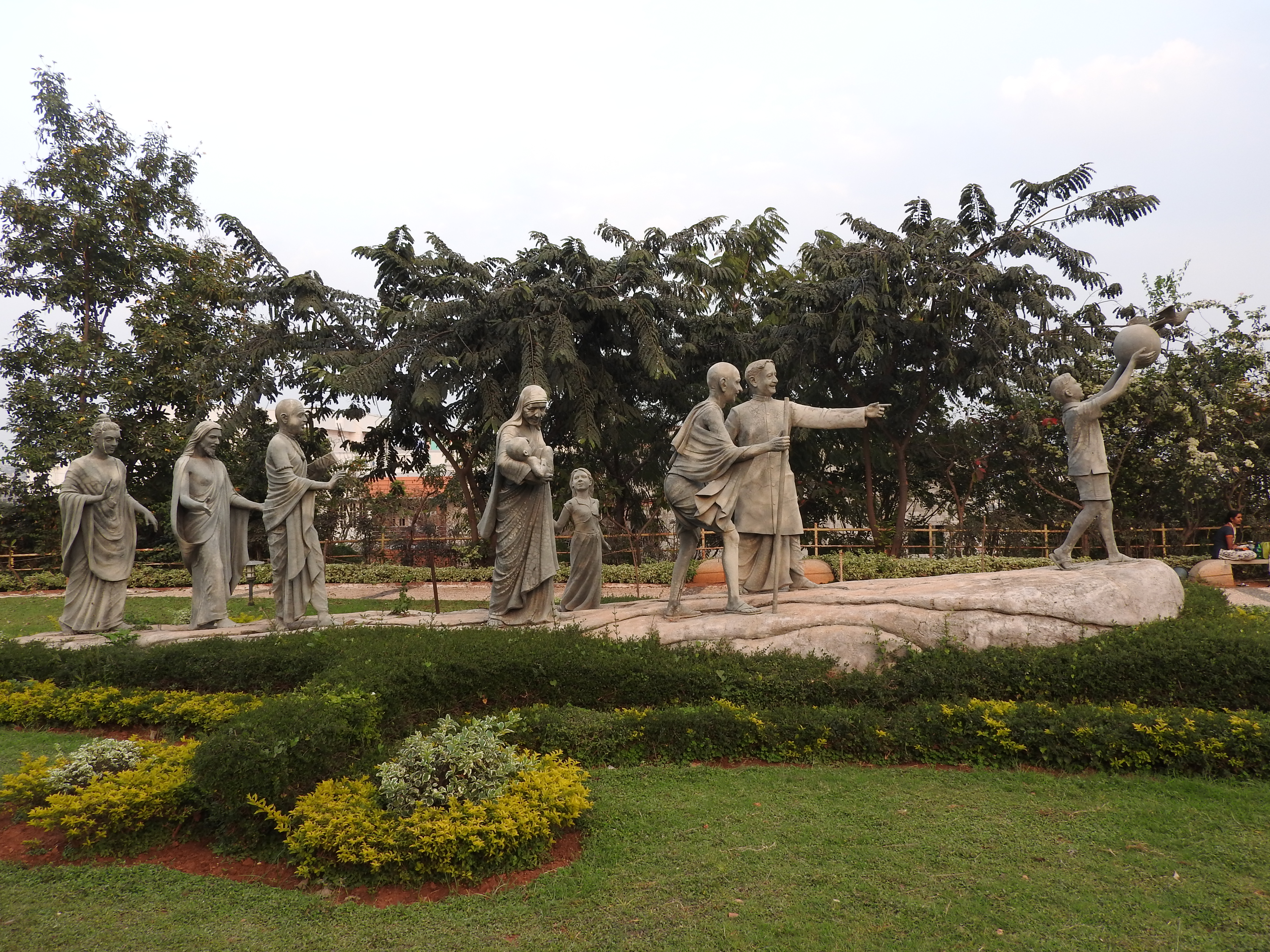
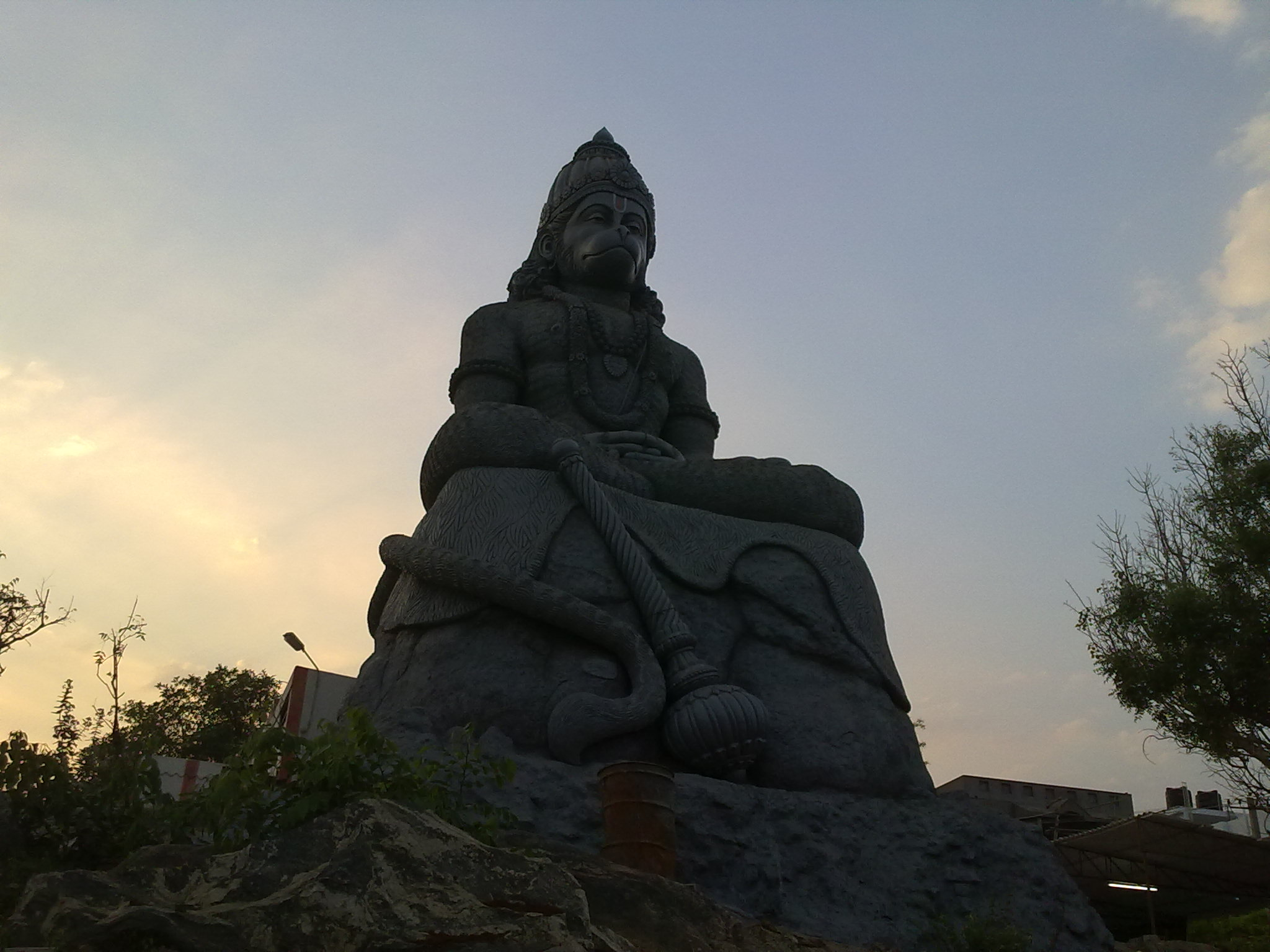
- (Top to bottom) Outer Ring Road near Nagarbhavi Circle, Monument at Zen Park, Hanuman statue at a temple

- Location within Bengaluru
- Coordinates: 12.95814°N 77.51876°E
- Country: India
- State: Karnataka
- District: Bangalore Urban
- Metro: Bangalore
- Zone: Bangalore West

Languages
  - Official: Kannada
- Time zone: UTC+5:30 (IST)
- PIN: 560072
- Telephone code: 91-80
- Vehicle registration: KA-41

Nagarabhavi (also referred to as Nagarbhavi) is a residential area in West Bangalore, Karnataka, India. It is located between Mysore Road and Magadi Road.

It is surrounded by Vijaynagar on the south, Bangalore University and Chandra Layout on the east, Magadi road on the north and Sir.M.V.Layout on the west, and Kengeri to the south. Nagarabhavi is broadly divided into two areas, called Nagarabhavi 1st stage and Nagarabhavi 2nd stage.

Traditionally known as the home of Bangalore University, the area also has the National Law School of India University, Dr. Ambedkar Institute of Technology and Dr. BR Ambedkar School of Economics.

Nagarabhavi 1st stage comprises the localities of Maruthinagara, Kalyana Nagara, Nagarabhavi Village, Canara bank Colony, Bhairaveshwara Nagar and Moodala Palya.

The nearest metro station are Vijaynagar and Attiguppe. It is near the Outer Ring Road which makes commute possible.

The BDA (Bengaluru Development Authority) has divided Nagarabhavi 2nd stage into blocks 1–12. Residential localities like Annapoorneshwari Nagara, Vinayaka Layout, ITI Layout, MPM Layout, NGEF Layout and Papareddy Palya form a part of this area.

== History ==
In Kannada, the language of a majority of people in the state, Nagarabhavi means "a well of snakes". It is called so because there used to exist a river with snakes which currently runs opposite to a cemetery and right next to Allwin Badminton Academy, Nagarbhavi. One school of thought is that the name is due to the high number of snakes present in the area. Also, some believe that it is called a "well" because of the surrounding hillocks that are no longer present due to urbanization. Nagarbhavi got its prime importance due to the establishment of Institute for Social and Economic Change (ISEC) in 1973.
