= Pattandur Agrahara metro station =

Namma Metro's Purple Line metro station

Pattandur Agrahara
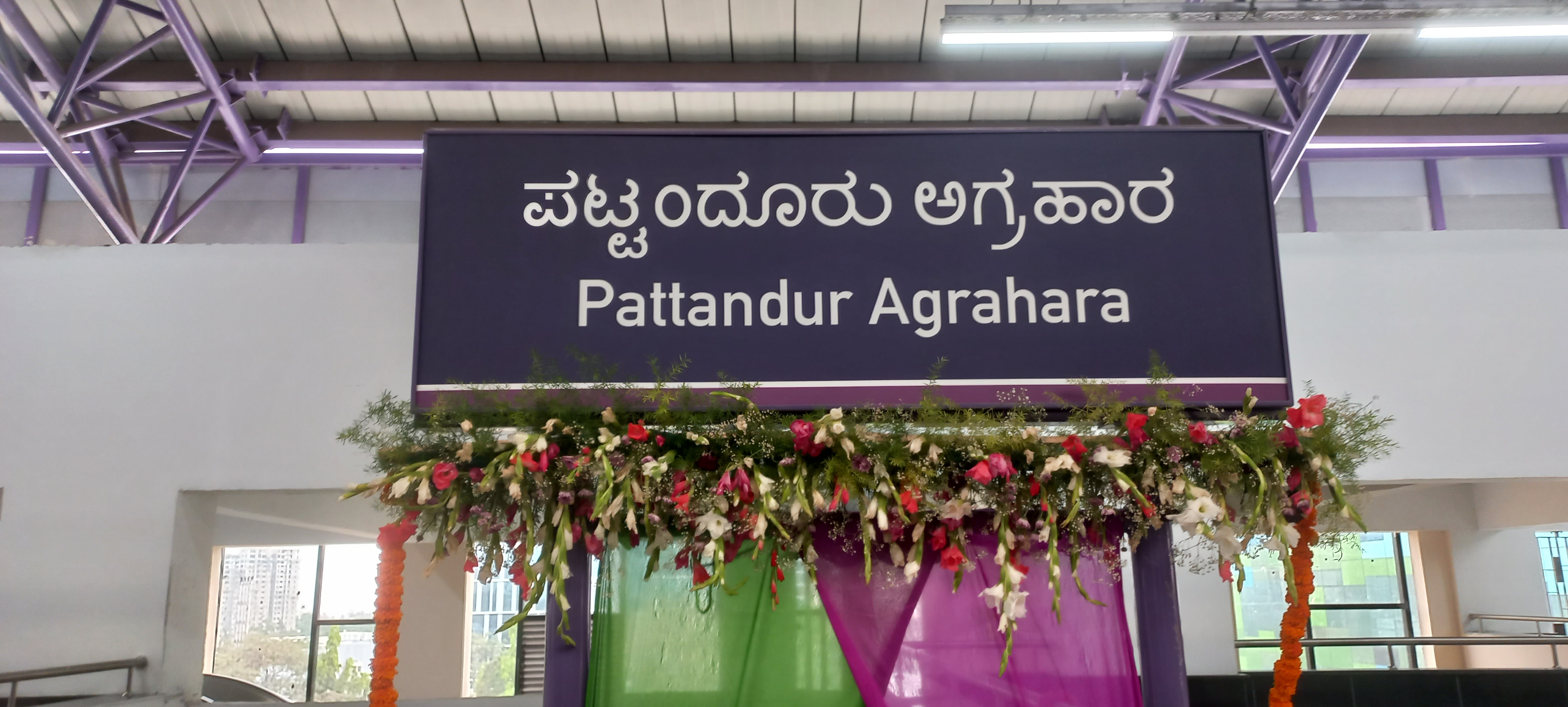
- Pattandur Agrahara metro station

General information
- Location: Whitefield Main Rd, Pattandur Agrahara, Whitefield, Bengaluru, Karnataka 560067
- Coordinates: 12.987613°N 77.738211°E
- System: Namma Metro station
- Owner: Bangalore Metro Rail Corporation Ltd (BMRCL)
- Operator: Namma Metro
- Line: Purple Line
- Platforms: Side platform Platform-1 → Whitefield (Kadugodi); Platform-2 → Mysuru Road / Challaghatta (Operational to Mysuru Road during peak hours)
- Tracks: 2

Construction
- Structure type: Elevated, Double track
- Platform levels: 2
- Parking: Two Wheelers
- Accessible: Yes
- Architect: ITD - ITD Cementation India JV

Other information
- Status: Staffed
- Station code: ITPL

History
- Opened: 26 March 2023; 3 years ago
- Electrified: 750 V DC third rail

Services
Preceding station	Namma Metro	Following station
Kadugodi Tree Park towards Whitefield (Kadugodi)	Purple Line	Sri Sathya Sai Hospital towards Mysuru Road or Challaghatta
Route map
Location

Pattandur Agrahara is an elevated metro station on the East-West corridor of the Purple Line of Namma Metro in Bengaluru, India. The Vivanta Bengaluru Hotel and some locations like ITPL, Ascendes Park Square Mall, Alfred Herbert India Ltd. and many more, are situated near this station. The station also has an eatery on the concourse level named Millets Cafe.

The Whitefield - Krishnarajapura trial runs were successfully conducted from 25 October 2022 for a month. This metro station was inaugurated on March 25, 2023 by Prime Minister Narendra Modi and was opened to the public on March 26, 2023.

In January 2026, the ITPB Metro Skywalk was inaugurated, providing direct connections to the Park Square Mall and to ITPL from the metro station through overhead walkways, circumventing the need to cross any roads. An elevator is provided for easier transit between the ground and the concourse.

It is the terminating station for the short-loop trains on the Purple Line that run between Pattandur Agrahara and Mysuru Road, and between Pattandur Agrahara and Majestic. The Pattandur Agrahara-Mysuru Road loop runs in the evening, between 4 pm and 8 pm (approximately), and its short-loop trains run with an average interval of five minutes. The Pattandur Agrahara-Majestic trains run at specified timings exclusively in the morning.

== Station layout ==
P	Side Platform | Doors will open on the left
P	Platform 1 Eastbound	Towards → Whitefield (Kadugodi); Next Station: Kadugodi Tree Park
P	Platform 2 Westbound	Towards ← Majestic / Mysuru Road / Challaghatta; Next Station: Sri Sathya Sai Hospital
P	Side Platform | Doors will open on the left
P	Note:	(Majestic / Mysuru Road - Operational during peak hours)
C	Concourse	Fare control, station agent, Metro Card vending machines, crossover
G	Street level	Exit/Entrance

== Entry/Exit ==
There are 3 Entry/Exit points — A, B and C. Commuters can use either of the points for their travel.

- Entry/Exit point A - Towards Thigalarapalya side
- Entry/Exit point B - Towards Pattandur Agrahara side
- Entry/Exit point C - Towards ITPB/Park Square Mall

== See also ==
- Bangalore
- List of Namma Metro stations
- Transport in Karnataka
- List of metro systems
- List of rapid transit systems in India
- Bangalore Metropolitan Transport Corporation
