= Pantharapalya–Nayandahalli metro station =

Namma Metro's Purple Line metro station

Pantharapalya - Nayandahalli
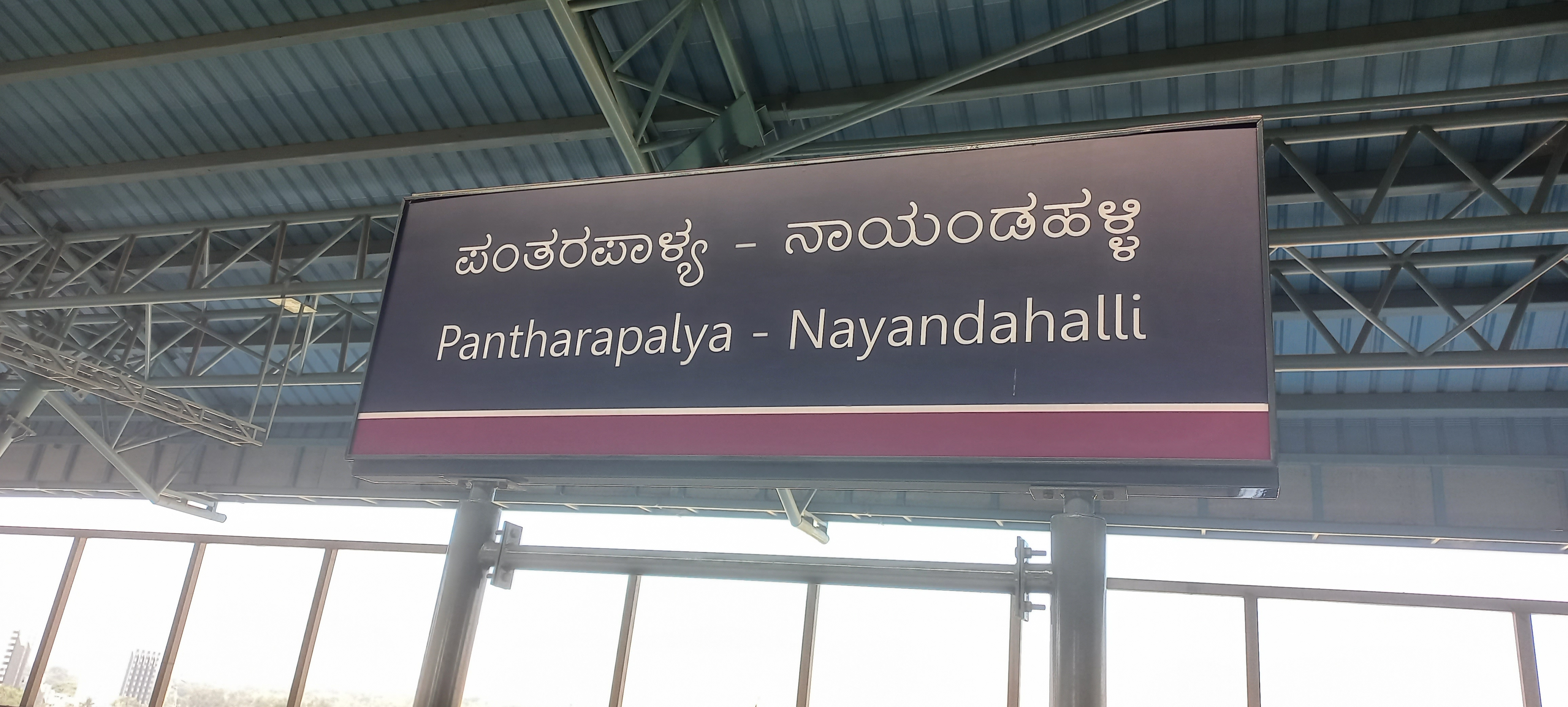
- Pantharapalya - Nayandahalli Metro Station (as of Feb '23)

General information
- Other names: Nayandahalli
- Location: Ranganathan Colony, Nayanda Halli, Bengaluru, Karnataka 560026
- Coordinates: 12.946818299217002°N 77.53132036239334°E
- System: Namma Metro station
- Owner: Bangalore Metro Rail Corporation Ltd (BMRCL)
- Operator: Namma Metro
- Line: Purple Line
- Platforms: Side platform Platform-1 → Whitefield (Kadugodi); Platform-2 → Challaghatta
- Tracks: 2

Construction
- Structure type: Elevated, Double track
- Platform levels: 2
- Parking: Available
- Architect: IL&FS

Other information
- Status: Staffed
- Station code: NYHM

History
- Opened: 30 August 2021; 5 years ago
- Electrified: 750 V DC third rail

Services
Preceding station	Namma Metro	Following station
Mysuru Road towards Whitefield (Kadugodi)	Purple Line	Rajarajeshwari Nagar towards Challaghatta
Route map
Location

Pantharapalya - Nayandahalli (formerly known as Nayandahalli) is an elevated metro station on the East-West corridor of the Purple Line of Namma Metro serving the borders of Banashankari and Mysore Road along with Bangalore University campus in Bengaluru, India. It was inaugurated on 29 August 2021 and opened to the public on 30 August 2021.

== Station layout ==
G	Street level	Exit/Entrance
L1	Mezzanine	Fare control, station agent, Metro Card vending machines, crossover
L2	Side platform | Doors will open on the left
L2	Platform 1 Eastbound	Towards → Whitefield (Kadugodi); Next Station: Mysuru Road; Change at the next station for Orange Line **
L2	Platform 2 Westbound	Towards ← Challaghatta; Next Station: Rajarajeshwari Nagar
L2	Side platform | Doors will open on the left
L2

== Entry/Exit ==
There are 2 Entry/Exit points - A and B. Commuters can use either of the points for their travel.

- Entry/Exit point A - Towards Pantharapalya side
- Entry/Exit point B - Towards Nayandahalli Junction side

== See also ==
- Bangalore
- List of Namma Metro stations
- Transport in Karnataka
- List of metro systems
- List of rapid transit systems in India
