= Rajarajeshwari Nagar metro station =

Namma Metro's Purple Line metro station

Rajarajeshwari Nagar
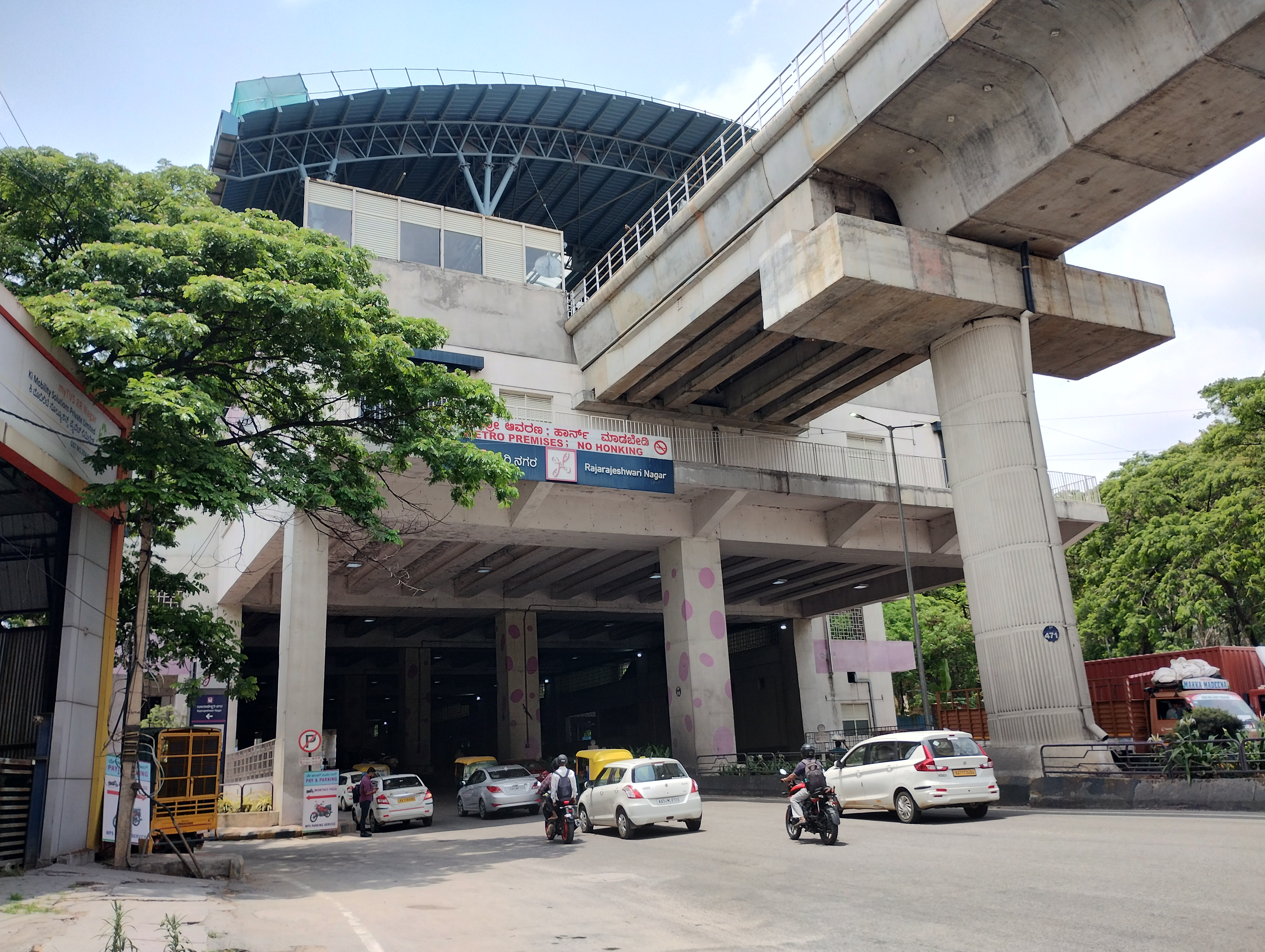

General information
- Other names: Rajarajeshwari Nagara, R. R. Nagar, R. R. Nagara
- Location: Rajarajeshwari Temple Rd, Remco Bhel Layout, Javarandoddi, RR Nagar, Bengaluru, Karnataka 560039
- Coordinates: 12.936726772385073°N 77.51958224362052°E
- System: Namma Metro station
- Owner: Bangalore Metro Rail Corporation Ltd (BMRCL)
- Operator: Namma Metro
- Line: Purple Line
- Platforms: Side platform Platform-1 → Whitefield (Kadugodi); Platform-2 → Challaghatta
- Tracks: 2

Construction
- Structure type: Elevated, Double track
- Platform levels: 2
- Parking: Available
- Architect: IL&FS

Other information
- Status: Staffed
- Station code: RRRN

History
- Opened: 30 August 2021; 5 years ago
- Electrified: 750 V DC third rail

Services
Preceding station	Namma Metro	Following station
Pantharapalya–Nayandahalli towards Whitefield (Kadugodi)	Purple Line	Jnanabharathi towards Challaghatta
Route map
Location

Rajarajeshwari Nagar is an elevated metro station on the East-West corridor of the Purple Line of Namma Metro serving the residential locality of Rajarajeshwari Nagar which was named after the Jnanalakshi Rajarajeshwari temple located in Rajarajeshwari Nagar in Bengaluru, India. To the north is the Bangalore University and to the south is the suburb city of Kengeri along with Kengeri Metro Station. The station was inaugurated on 29 August 2021 and was opened to the public on 30 August 2021.

== Station layout ==
G	Street level	Exit/Entrance
L1	Mezzanine	Fare control, station agent, Metro Card vending machines, crossover
L2	Side platform | Doors will open on the left
L2	Platform 1 Eastbound	Towards → Whitefield (Kadugodi); Next Station: Pantharapalya - Nayandahalli
L2	Platform 2 Westbound	Towards ← Challaghatta; Next Station: Jnanabharathi
L2	Side platform | Doors will open on the left
L2

== Gallery ==
Some of this metro station pictures are shown below:-

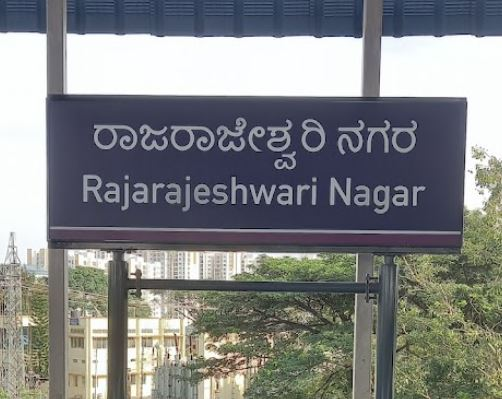
Station board of this metro station

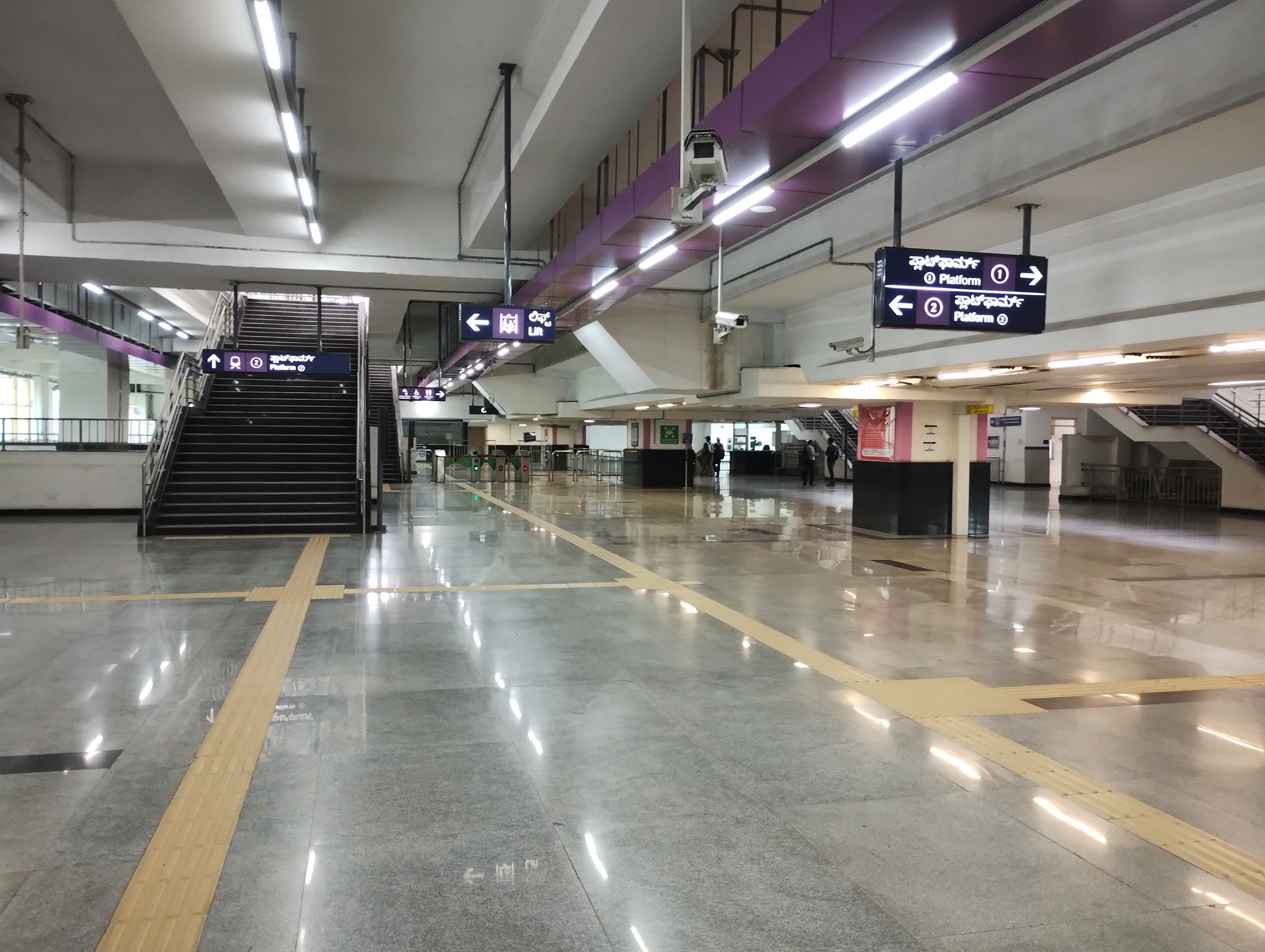
Interiors of the station (2024)

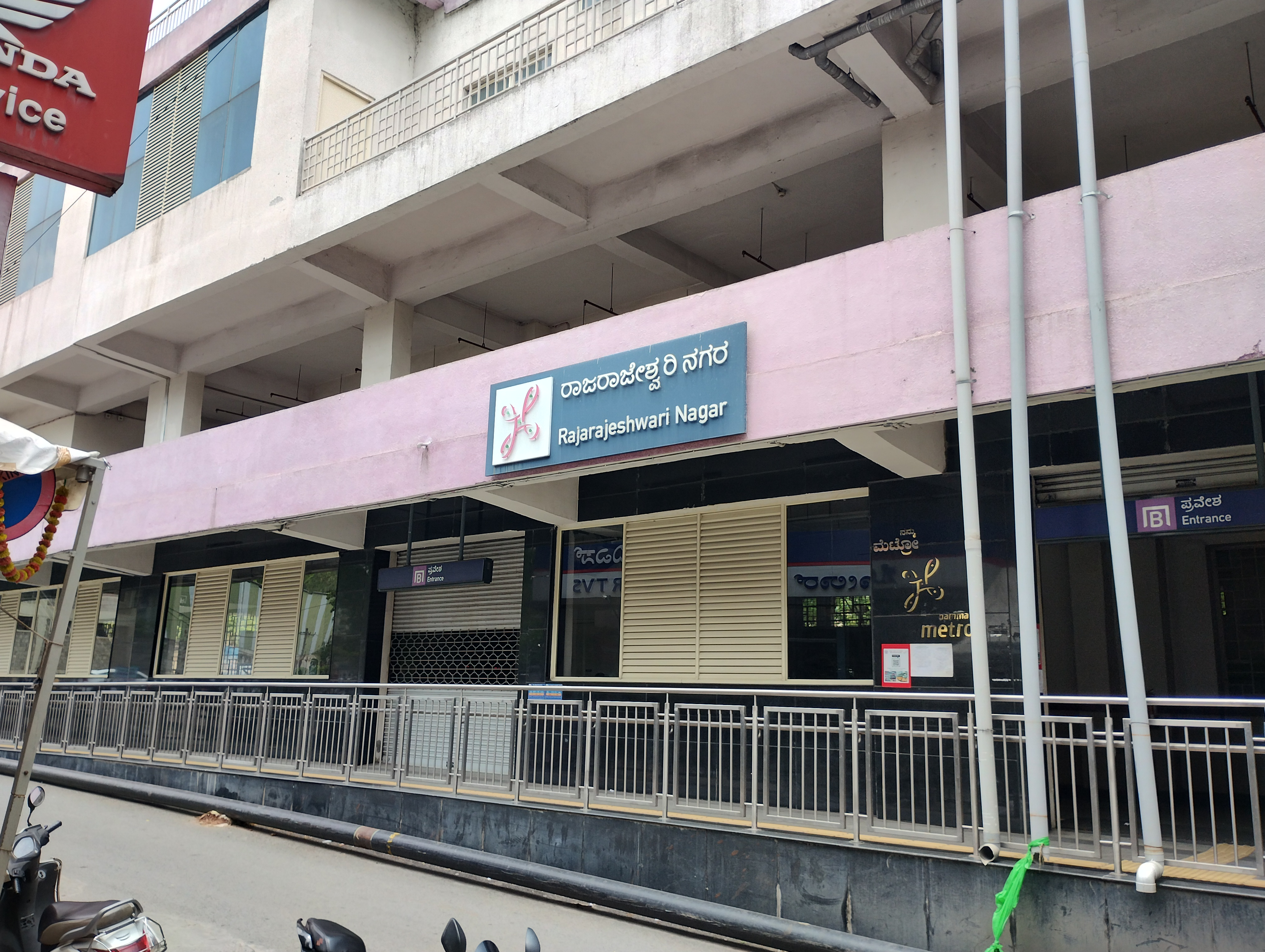
Front Entrance B (2024)

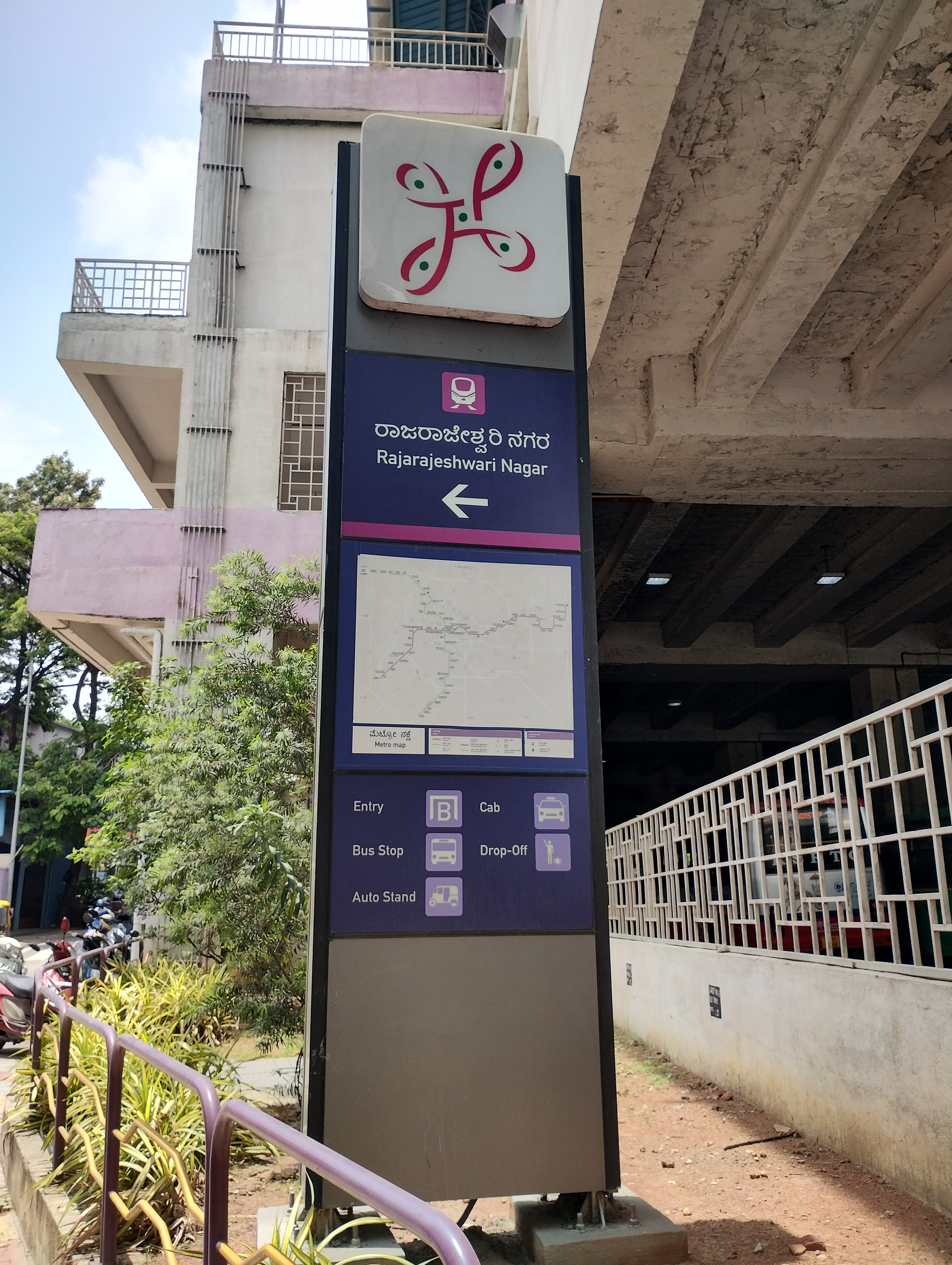
Namma Metro Sign Board of this metro station

== Entry/Exits ==
There are 2 Entry/Exit points – A and B. Commuters can use either of the points for their travel.

- Entry/Exit point A: Towards Gopalan Arcade Mall side
- Entry/Exit point B: Towards Sports Authority of India side

== See also ==
- Bangalore
- List of Namma Metro stations
- Transport in Karnataka
- List of metro systems
- List of rapid transit systems in India
