= Channasandra =

- Location in Karnataka, India
- Coordinates: 12.9795°N 77.7635°E
- Country: India
- State: Karnataka
- District: Bangalore

Languages
  - Official: Kannada
- Time zone: UTC+5:30 (IST)
- PIN: 560067

Channasandra is a village situated on the eastern periphery of Bangalore city, in the Kadugodi Nagondahalli, Tirumala Shetti Halli neighborhood. The village lies between Bangalore Urban and Bangalore Rural, separated from the rural areas by a lake that flows from Nandi hills (Dakshinapenakini). It belongs to the Mahadevapura (Vidhan Sabha constituency) and has a large population, with many migrants.

The majority of people in Channasandra follow Lord Shiva, Basava (the establisher of Anubhava Mantapa), and Kempegowda (the founder and creator of Bangalore). The Veerashaiva Lingath community has the highest population in the area, followed by the Vokaliga (Gowda) and Ksthariya communities. The villagers hold great reverence for Lord Parvati avatar called Savaramma, Kateeramma, and Lord Shiva's Nandi called Basava.

Channasandra is conveniently located near Whitefield railway station, just 1.3 km away, and 2.5 km away from ITPL. The Nexus neighborhood mall is also within close proximity, just 2 km away.

The village was named after the followers of Basava and Kittur Rani Chennamma. During the First War of Independence in 1857, the British controlled Channasandra as a colonial outpost from Whitefield. After 1886, officers of the Kolar Gold Mine used to stay and travel from Whitefield.

Chennamma, who valiantly fought against the colonial rulers more than three decades before the First War of Independence in 1857, is highly admired for her contribution to upholding the self-esteem of the local people. However, her sacrifice is not well-known to the present generation. During this period, the name Channasandra was changed to Chennasandra to honor Chennamma. "Chenna" means divine love for Chennamma, and "Sandra" means samudra, as the people used to surge like waves in the ocean against the East India Company (British).
