= Kadugodi Tree Park metro station =

Namma Metro's Purple Line metro station

Kadugodi Tree Park
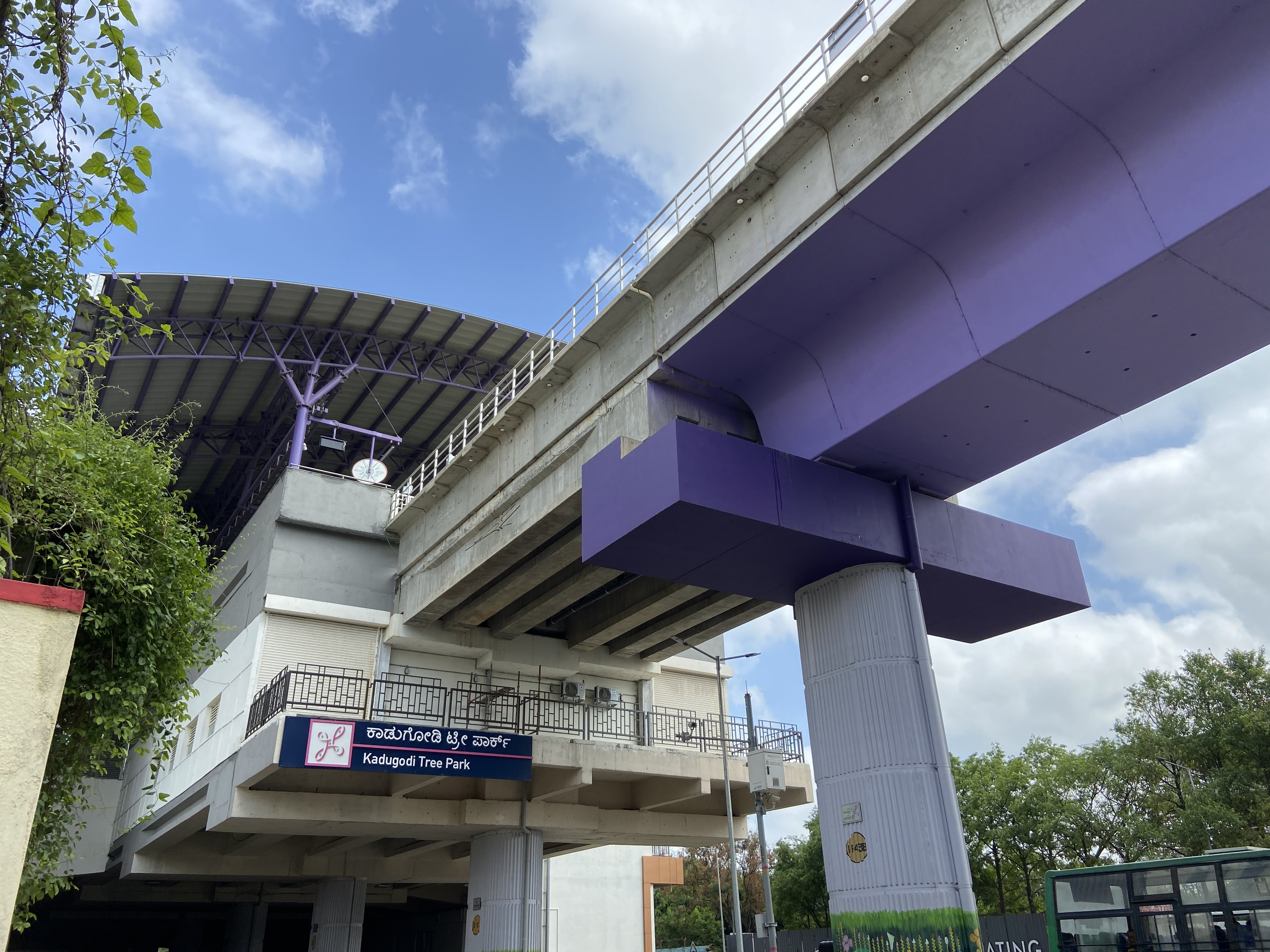
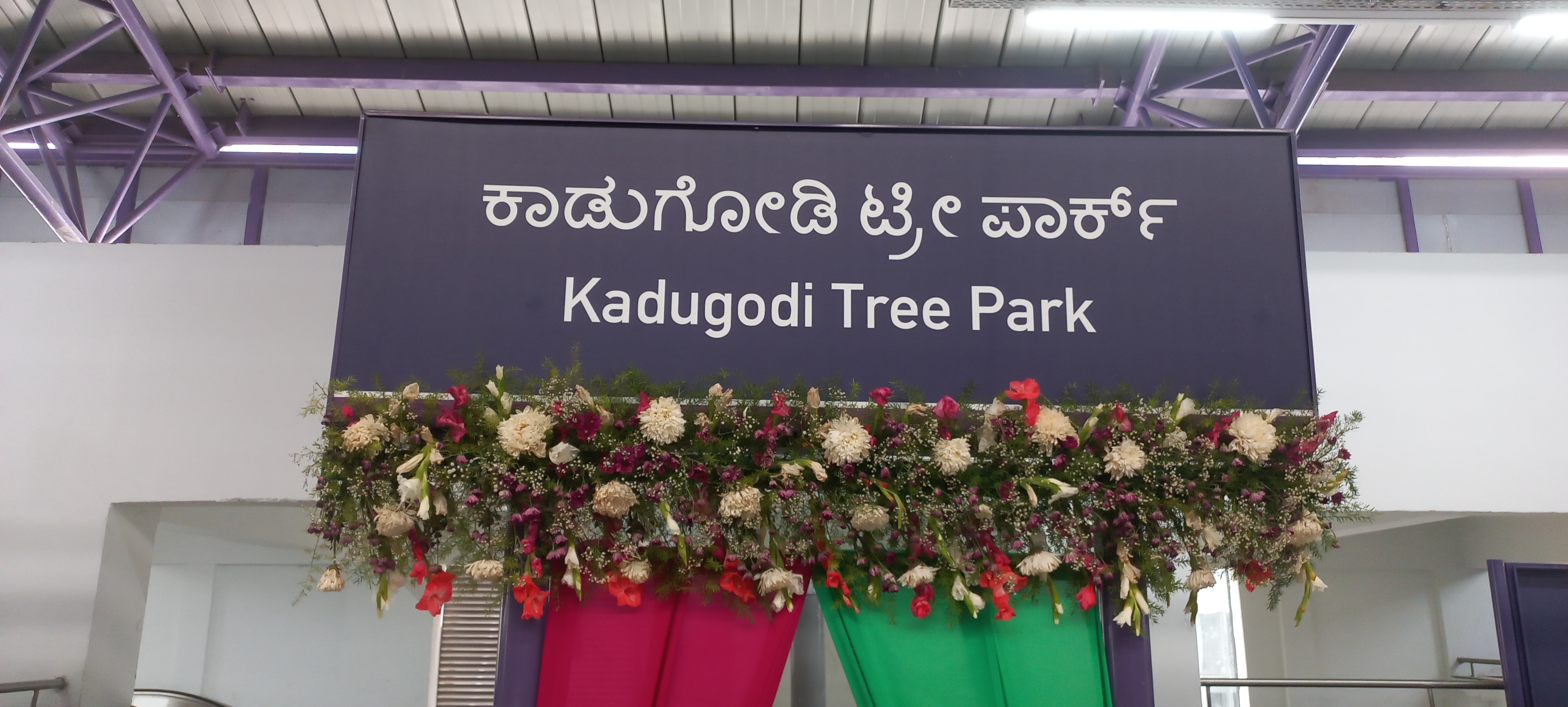
- Kadugodi Tree Park metro station

General information
- Other names: Kadugodi
- Location: Whitefield Main Rd, Kadugodi Colony, Kadugodi, Bengaluru, Karnataka 560066
- Coordinates: 12.98565°N 77.74690°E
- System: Namma Metro station
- Owner: Bangalore Metro Rail Corporation Ltd (BMRCL)
- Operator: Namma Metro
- Line: Purple Line
- Platforms: Side platform Platform-1 → Whitefield (Kadugodi); Platform-2 → Challaghatta
- Tracks: 2

Construction
- Structure type: Elevated, Double track
- Platform levels: 2
- Parking: Two Wheelers
- Accessible: Yes
- Architect: ITD - ITD Cementation India JV

Other information
- Status: Staffed
- Station code: KDGD

History
- Opened: 26 March 2023; 3 years ago
- Electrified: 750 V DC third rail

Services
Preceding station	Namma Metro	Following station
Hopefarm Channasandra towards Whitefield (Kadugodi)	Purple Line	Pattandur Agrahara towards Challaghatta
Route map
Location

Kadugodi Tree Park (formerly known as Kadugodi) is an elevated metro station on the East-West corridor of the Purple Line of Namma Metro in Bengaluru, India which serves the suburban area of Kadugodi. The Kadugudi Tree Park and some IT Companies (Goldman Sachs, HP Enterprise, etc.) are in close proximity to this station.

The Whitefield - Krishnarajapura trial runs were successfully conducted from 25 October for a month. This metro station was inaugurated on March 25, 2023 by Prime Minister Narendra Modi and was opened to the public on March 26, 2023.

== Station layout ==
L2	Side Platform | Doors will open on the left
L2	Platform 1 Eastbound	Towards → Whitefield (Kadugodi); Next Station: Hopefarm Channasandra
L2	Platform 2 Westbound	Towards ← Challaghatta; Next Station: Pattandur Agrahara
L2	Side Platform | Doors will open on the left
L1	Concourse	Fare control, station agent, Metro Card vending machines, crossover
G	Street level	Exit/Entrance

== Entry/Exit ==
There are 2 Entry/Exit points - A and B. Commuters can use either of the points for their travel.

- Entry/Exit point A - Towards Kadugodi Tree Park side
- Entry/Exit point B - Towards Pattandur Agrahara side

== See also ==
- Kadugodi
- Bangalore
- List of Namma Metro stations
- Transport in Karnataka
- List of metro systems
- List of rapid transit systems in India
- Bangalore Metropolitan Transport Corporation
