= Mysuru Road metro station =

Namma Metro's Purple Line metro station and upcoming interchange for Orange Line

Mysuru Road
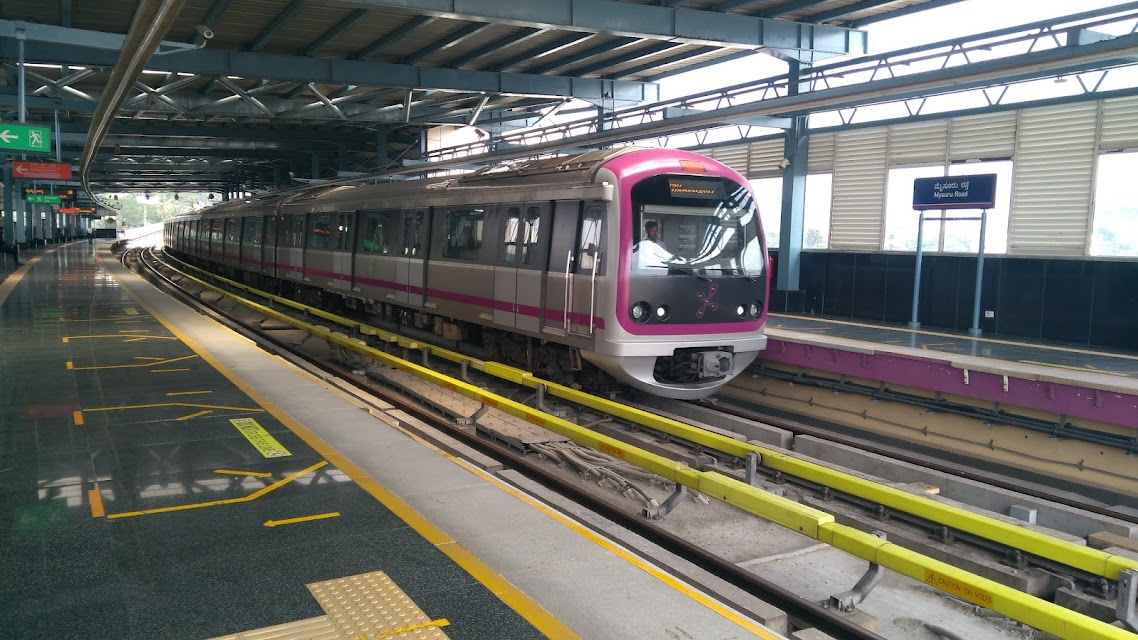
- Namma Metro train at Mysuru Road metro station heading towards Kengeri

General information
- Location: Mysore Rd, Muthachari Industrial Estate, Deepanjali Nagar, Bengaluru, Karnataka 560039
- Coordinates: 12.946507°N 77.529780°E
- System: Namma Metro station
- Owner: Bangalore Metro Rail Corporation Ltd (BMRCL)
- Operator: Namma Metro
- Line: Purple Line Orange Line
- Platforms: Side platform Platform-1 → Baiyappanahalli / Pattandur Agrahara / Whitefield (Kadugodi); Platform-2 → Challaghatta (Operational to Baiyappanahalli, Pattandur Agrahara during peak hours) (TBC)
- Tracks: 2 (current)

Construction
- Structure type: Elevated, Double track
- Platform levels: 2 (current)
- Parking: Available
- Accessible: Yes
- Architect: Punj Lloyd - Sembawang Infrastructure (India) JV

Other information
- Status: Staffed
- Station code: MYRD

History
- Opened: 16 November 2015; 10 years ago
- Opening: (TBC)
- Electrified: 750 V DC third rail (Purple Line) (TBC) (Orange Line)

Services
Preceding station	Namma Metro	Following station
Deepanjali Nagar towards Pattandur Agrahara or Whitefield (Kadugodi)	Purple Line	Pantharapalya–Nayandahalli towards Challaghatta
Dwaraka Nagar towards JP Nagar 4th Phase	Orange Line (Proposed)	Nagarbhavi Circle towards Kempapura
Route map
Location

Mysuru Road is an elevated metro station on the East-West corridor of the Purple Line of Namma Metro serving Muthachari Industrial Estate, Nayandahalli and Deepanjali Nagar in Bengaluru. It was opened to the public on 16 November 2015. This metro station is proposed to act as an interchange for the upcoming Orange Line under Phase 3.

It is the terminating station for the short-loop trains on the Purple Line that run between Pattandur Agrahara and Mysuru Road, and between Garudacharpalya and Mysuru Road. The Pattandur Agrahara-Mysuru Road loop runs in the evening, between 4 pm and 8 pm (approximately), and its short-loop trains run with an average interval of five minutes. The Garudacharpalya-Mysuru Road trains run between 7:45 am and 9:00 am (approximately) in the morning with ten-minute intervals.

== Station layout ==
Purple Line Station Layout

G	Street level	Exit/Entrance
L1	Mezzanine	Fare control, station agent, Metro Card vending machines, crossover
L2	Side platform | Doors will open on the left
L2	Platform 1 Eastbound	Towards → Baiyappanahalli / Pattandur Agrahara / Whitefield (Kadugodi); Next Station: Deepanjali Nagar
L2	Platform 2 Westbound	Towards ← Challaghatta; Next Station: Pantharapalya–Nayandahalli
L2	Side platform | Doors will open on the left
L2	Note:	(Towards Pattandur Agrahara - Operational during peak hours)(Towards Baiyappanahalli - Operational during Evening peak hours)

Orange Line Station Layout (TBC)

G	Street level	Exit/Entrance
L1	Mezzanine	Fare control, station agent, Metro Card vending machines, crossover
L2	Side platform | Doors will open on the left
L2	Platform 1 Northbound	Towards → Kempapura; Next Station: Nagarbhavi Circle
L2	Platform 2 Southbound	Towards ← JP Nagar 4th Phase; Next Station: Dwaraka Nagar
L2	Side platform | Doors will open on the left
L2

== Entry/Exits ==
There are 4 Entry/Exit points – A, B, C and D. Commuters can use either of the points for their travel.

- Entry/Exit point A: Towards Nayandahalli Junction side with wheelchair accessibility
- Entry/Exit point B: Towards BHEL side
- Entry/Exit point C: Towards Outer Ring Road side
- Entry/Exit point D: Towards Nayandahalli Junction side with wheelchair accessibility

== See also ==
- Bangalore
- List of Namma Metro stations
- Transport in Karnataka
- List of metro systems
- List of rapid transit systems in India
- Metro in bangalore
