= Chennamma =

Chennamma may refer to:

- Chennamma Deve Gowda, spouse of former Indian prime minister H. D. Deve Gowda.
- Kittur Chennamma (1778–1829), the queen of the princely state of Kittur in Karnataka who fought the British army
- Keladi Chennamma (died 1696), the queen of kingdom of Keladi in Karnataka, who fought Mughal Army of Aurangzeb
