= Vimanapura =

- neighbourhood
- Location within Bengaluru
- Coordinates: 12°57′51″N 77°40′6″E
- Country: India
- State: Karnataka
- Metro: Bangalore

Languages
  - Official: Kannada
- Time zone: UTC+5:30
- PIN: 560017
- Telephone code: 91-80
- ISO 3166 code: IN-KA
- Vehicle registration: KA 03
- Lok Sabha constituency: Bangalore North
- Vidhan Sabha constituency: Krishnarajapura
- Website: karnataka.gov.in

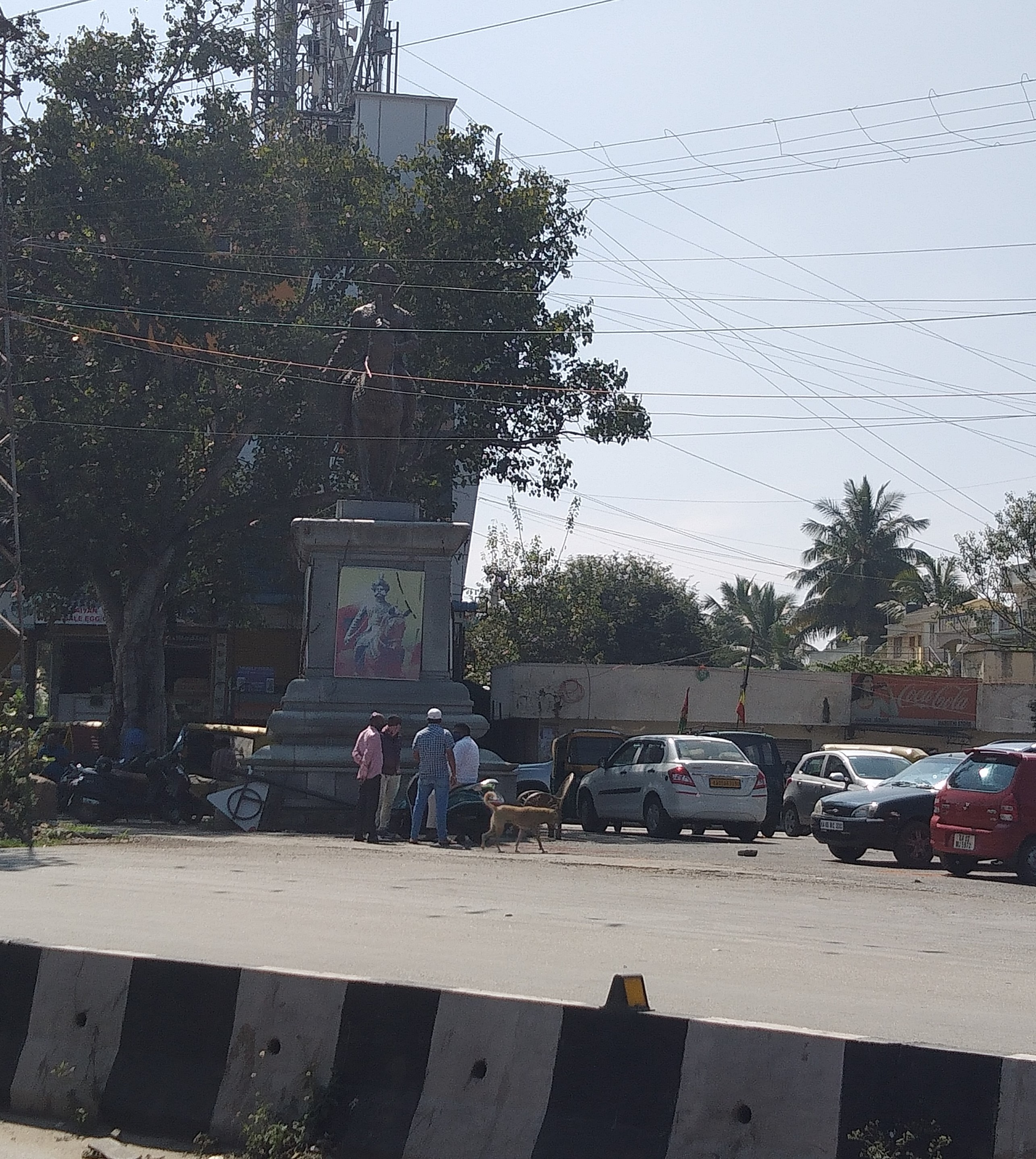
Kempe Gowda Circle, Suranjan Das Road and New Thippasandra/GM Palya Main Road JN

Vimanapura or Baiyyappanahalli Vimanapura is an eastern suburb of Bangalore in Karnataka in India. It is so called because it is near Bangalore HAL airport. Vimanapura houses many of the HAL offices and the HAL hospital. The busy Old Airport Road goes through it.

== History ==
Old Baiyyappanahalli, a village in Bangalore South Taluk, was called as Baiyyappanahalli Manavarthe Kaval populated with 2742 inhabitants (1429 Male and 1313 Female) in 1981 and was considered as uninhabited during 1991 Census. It was merged with Vimanapura (which was then called as Baiyyappanahalli Vimanapura) which hosted 11441 citizens (6157 Male and 5284 Female) in 1981. Baiyyappanahalli NMCT (Non Municipal Census Town) consisted of Baiyyappanahalli Manavarthe Kaval, Benniganahalli and Baiyyappanahalli Vimanapura and was a home to 14905 persons (7873 Male and 7032 Female) during 1991 Census.

In January 2007, the Karnataka Government issued a notification to merge the areas under then Bangalore Mahanagara Palike with seven City municipal council (CMC)'s, one Town municipal council (TMC) and 110 villages around the city (including Baiyyappanahalli NMCT) to form a single administrative body, Bruhat Bengaluru Mahanagara Palike. The process was completed by April 2007 and the body was renamed Bruhat Bengaluru Mahanagara Palike (Greater Bangalore Municipal Corporation).

Population details
Village Name	Area in Hectares (1961)	1971	Population (1961)	1971	1981	1991	2001	2011
Baiyyappanahalli Vimanapura	387	156.64	1619	2361	11441			
Baiyyappanahalli Manavarthe Kaval	257	93.26	-	4450	2742			
Benniganahalli		779	1180	2795	5772			
Baiyyappanahalli (NMCT)						14905	16360	BBMP

== Transport ==
=== Metro station ===
Baiyappanahalli metro station is the eastern terminal point on the east–west corridor of the Namma Metro in Bangalore, India. Baiyappanahalli also hosts the Coaching depot for Metro service.

It is about 7 miles east of the old center of Bangalore.

Its name is Sanskrit for "Airplane Town"; see Vimana.

Many businesses are based there.

The Indian Air Force has a base there.

It is well connected by many BMTC buses. From Kempegowda bus station (Majestic bus stand), one can take route number 333 buses to reach Vimanapura. One of the important roads here is Suranjan Das Road. This road connects the Airport Road to Old Madras Road. On one side of this road are the HAL quarters (housing colony) and on the other side are the HAL offices. This road also houses the HAL hospital, HAL market, BEML and also in the middle has Sadbhavana Park, with a beautiful walking track.

Other localities which are part of the Vimanapura area are Annasandrapalya, Basava Nagar, Islampura, Jagadish Nagar, Jyothi Nagar, Lal Bahadur Shastri Nagar (L. B. Shastri Nagar), Nellurupura, Ramesh Nagar, Reddypalya and Vibhutipura. L. B. Shastri Nagar has many apartments and has a park (Uthkarsh park). The park is privately maintained by the Uthkarsh community who are a group of individuals dedicated to making a positive difference to the surrounding civic conditions.

== Examples of organizations with premises in Vimanapura ==
- Hindustan Aeronautics Limited
- Indian Space Research Organisation
- Indian Society of Aerospace Medicine
- Air India
- Aeronautical development agency
