= Lingarajapuram =

Lingarajapuram St Thomas Town
- Neighbourhood
- Interactive map of Lingarajapuram
- Coordinates: 13°0′42″N 77°37′31″E
- Country: India
- State: Karnataka
- Metro: Bangalore

Languages
  - Official: Kannada
  - Spoken: Kannada, Tamil, Telugu, urdu, Hindi and English
- Time zone: UTC+5:30 (IST)
- PIN: 560084

Lingarajapuram (also spelled Lingarajapura) is a locality located in the north-eastern part of the city of Bangalore, on the outskirts of the Bangalore Cantonment. The Lingarajapuram Flyover, which acts one of the thoroughfares connecting the north-eastern suburbs with the city, witnesses bottleneck traffic congestion during peak hours.
