= Banaswadi railway station =

Railway Station in Karnataka, India

Banaswadi ಬಾಣಸವಾಡಿ
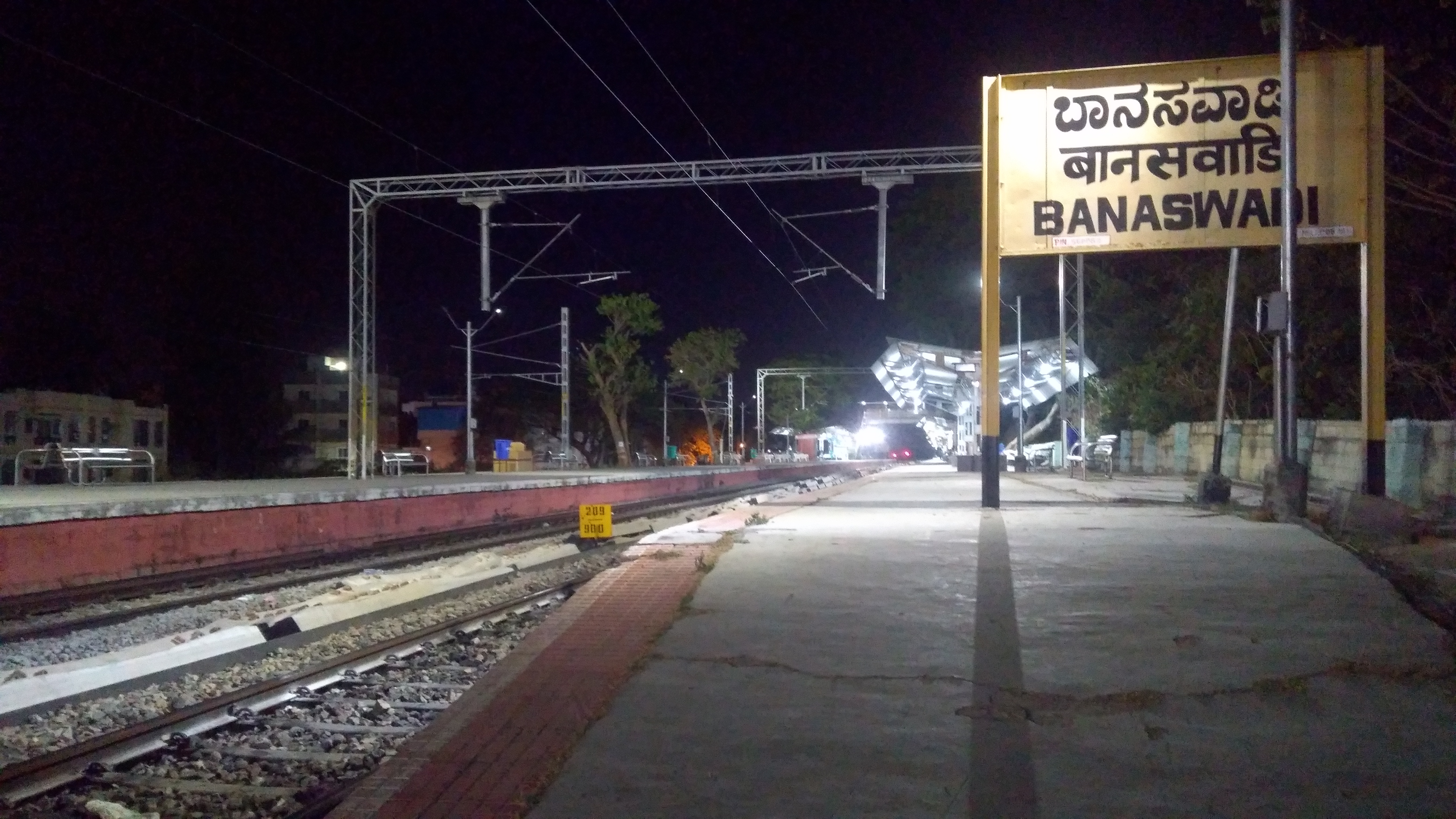

General information
- Location: Jayabharath Nagar, Maruthi Sevanagar, Bangalore; India
- Coordinates: 13.0061°N 77.6277°E
- Elevation: 911 metres (2,989 ft)
- System: Indian Railways station
- Owner: Indian Railways
- Operator: South Western Railway
- Line: Salem–Bangalore line
- Platforms: 3
- Tracks: 3
- Connections: Taxi, Auto

Construction
- Structure type: At Grade
- Parking: Yes
- Cycle facilities: No

Other information
- Status: Functioning
- Station code: BAND
- Fare zone: South Western Railway
Location

Banaswadi railway station (station code: BAND) is an Indian Railways train station located in Banaswadi, Bangalore, in the Indian state of Karnataka, which is about 12 km away from the Bangalore City railway station and serves the Banaswadi and Baiyyappanahalli areas.

== Structure ==
Banaswadi has three platforms, each running to 400m in length, shelters, lighting, benches and a booking office.

== Line ==
Banaswadi railway station is on a branch line within Bangalore connecting Yesvantpur Junction and Baiyappanahalli. From Baiyappanahalli, trains can either turn to the single electric line to Salem Junction via Hosur or continue straight towards Bangarapet. From Yesvantpur, they can either turn towards Arsikere Junction, Bangalore City Railway Station or Dharmavaram.

== See also ==
- List of railway stations in India
