= Baiyyappanahalli =

- neighbourhood
- Location within Bengaluru
- Coordinates: 12.99098408751037°N 77.6525324569304°E
- Country: India
- State: Karnataka
- Metro: Bengaluru

Languages
  - Official: Kannada, English
- Time zone: UTC+5:30 (IST)
- PIN: 560033,560038

Baiyyappanahalli, or New Baiyyappanahalli Extension, is one of the neighbourhoods in Bengaluru, located in the eastern part of the city. It is part of C. V. Raman Nagar in East Bengaluru. The area serves as a transport hub and is well-known for the Baiyappanahalli metro station, Sir M. Visvesvaraya Terminal, and Baiyyappanahalli railway station.

== History ==
Old Baiyyappanahalli, a village in Bangalore South Taluk, was called as Baiyyappanahalli Manavarthe Kaval populated with 2742 inhabitants (1429 Male and 1313 Female) in 1981 and was considered as uninhabited during 1991 Census. It was merged with Vimanapura (which was then called as Baiyyappanahalli Vimanapura) which hosted 11441 citizens (6157 Male and 5284 Female) in 1981. Baiyyappanahalli NMCT (Non Municipal Census Town) consisted of Baiyyappanahalli Manavarthe Kaval, Benniganahalli and Baiyyappanahalli Vimanapura and was a home to 14905 persons (7873 Male and 7032 Female) during 1991 Census.

In January 2007, the Karnataka Government issued a notification to merge the areas under then Bangalore Mahanagara Palike with seven City municipal council (CMC)'s, one Town municipal council (TMC) and 110 villages around the city (including Baiyyappanahalli NMCT) to form a single administrative body, Bruhat Bengaluru Mahanagara Palike. The process was completed by April 2007 and the body was renamed Bruhat Bengaluru Mahanagara Palike (Greater Bangalore Municipal Corporation).

Population details
Village Name	Area in Hectares (1961)	1971	Population (1961)	1971	1981	1991	2001	2011
Baiyyappanahalli Vimanapura	387	156.64	1619	2361	11441			
Baiyyappanahalli Manavarthe Kaval	257	93.26	-	4450	2742			
Benniganahalli		779	1180	2795	5772			
Baiyyappanahalli (NMCT)						14905	16360	BBMP

== Transport ==
=== Metro station ===
Baiyappanahalli metro station lies in the east–west corridor of the Namma Metro in Bangalore which presently terminates at the Whitefield (Kadugodi). Baiyappanahalli also hosts the Coaching depot for Metro service.

=== Railway station ===
Baiyyappanahalli railway station is an Indian Railways train station located in Baiyyappanahalli, Bangalore which is located about 13 km away from the Bangalore City railway station and serves Baiyyappanahalli and Krishnarajapuram areas. Sir M. Visvesvaraya Terminal was inaugurated in 2022.

=== Third coaching Terminal ===
An Indian Railways train station being built at the same space where Baiyyappanahalli Yard once stood. This will be the city's third major Railway Terminal after KSR Bengaluru and Yesvantpur— is all set to be commissioned. Its façade modeled after the Kempegowda International Airport terminal, the new facility is bound to dramatically alter the departure and arrival experience of rail commuters. An Over bridge is being constructed on the approach road which leads to this station from Old Madras Road.

=== Satellite bus station, NGEF ===
A bus station was built at former NGEF land in Baiyyappanahalli which was a halt station for many buses of Karnataka State Road Transport Corporation and neighbouring state buses. There was a plan to make it a Terminal station for interstate buses which was never materialized. However the facility was decommissioned due to poor response.

== Location ==
Baiyappanahalli is in the eastern part of Bengaluru and adjoins the neighbourhoods of Indiranagar, CV Raman Nagar, Krishnarajapuram and Banaswadi.
