= Baiyyappanahalli railway station =

Railway station in Bangalore, India

Baiyyappanahalli
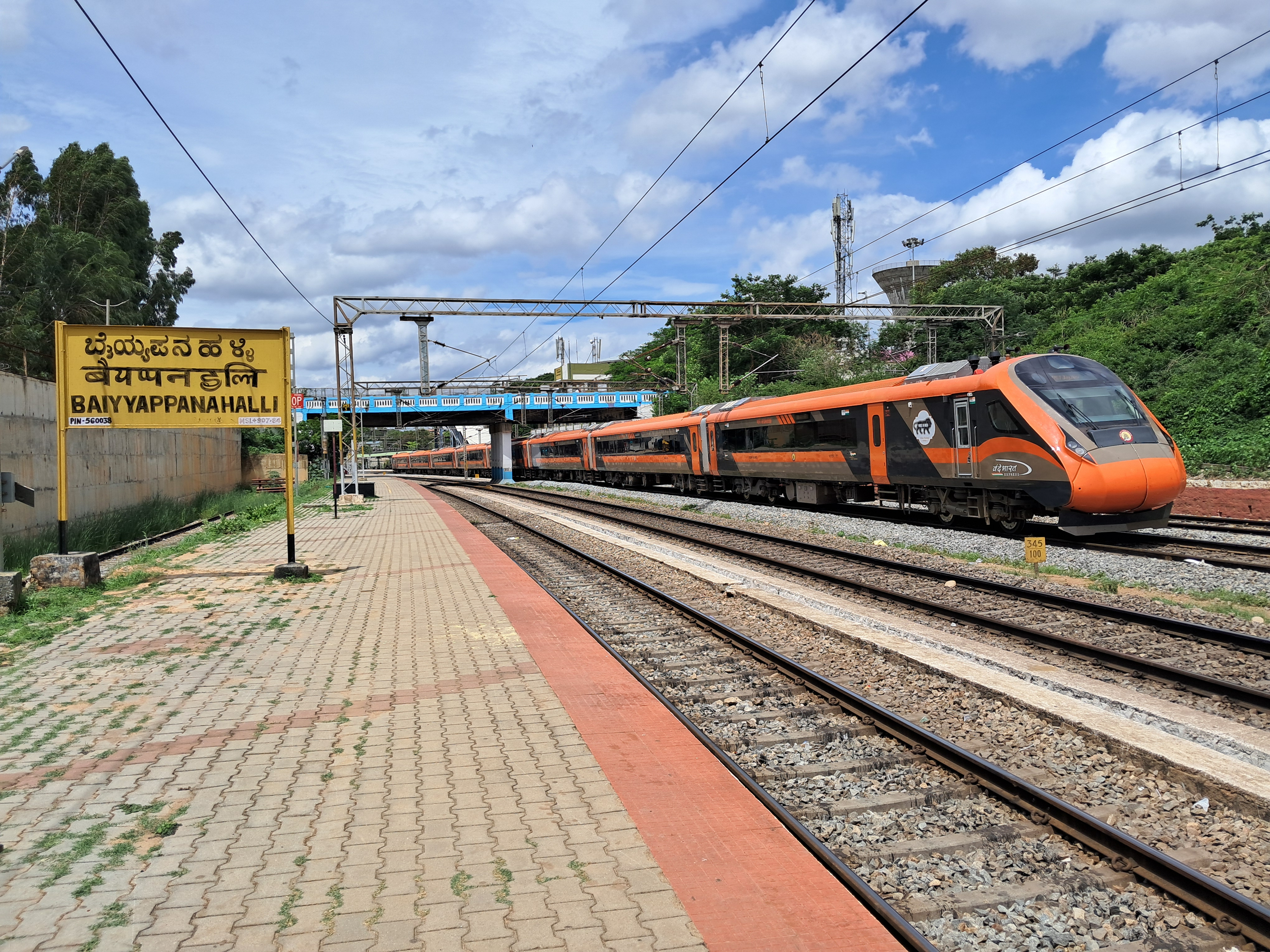
- Baiyyappanahalli railway station with Kalaburagi - SMVT Bengaluru Mini VB Express train on standby

General information
- Location: NGEF Main Rd, Sadanandanagar, Bennigana Halli, Bengaluru, Karnataka 560038; India
- Coordinates: 12.9912°N 77.6523°E
- Elevation: 909 m (2,982 ft)
- System: Indian Railways station
- Owner: Indian Railways
- Line: Chennai Central–Bangalore City line
- Platforms: 2
- Tracks: 4
- Connections: Purple Line Baiyappanahalli

Construction
- Structure type: At grade
- Parking: Yes
- Cycle facilities: Yes
- Accessible: Yes

Other information
- Station code: BYPL
- Fare zone: South Western Railways (SWR)

History
- Opened: 2008

Services
Preceding station	Indian Railways	Following station
Bengaluru East towards Bengaluru City	Chennai Central–Bangalore City line Jolarpettai–Bangalore section	Krishnarajapuram towards Chennai Central
Bengaluru East towards Bengaluru City	Chennai Central–Bangalore City line Jolarpettai–Bangalore section	Channasandra towards Yelahanka Junction
Banaswadi towards Yesvantpur Junction	Chennai Central–Bangalore City line Jolarpettai–Bangalore section	Krishnarajapuram towards Chennai Central
Banaswadi towards Yesvantpur Junction	Chennai Central–Bangalore City line Jolarpettai–Bangalore section	Channasandra towards Yelahanka Junction
Bengaluru East towards Bengaluru City	Salem Junction–Bangalore City line Baiyappanahalli–Omalur Junction section	Belandur Road towards Hosur or Salem Junction
Banaswadi towards Yesvantpur Junction	Salem Junction–Bangalore City line Baiyappanahalli–Omalur Junction section	Belandur Road towards Hosur or Salem Junction
Location

Baiyyappanahalli railway station (station code: BYPL) is an Indian Railways train station located in Baiyyappanahalli, Bangalore in the Indian state of Karnataka which is located about 13 km away from the Bangalore City railway station and serves Baiyyappanahalli, Indiranagar, Krishnarajapuram and HAL areas.

== Development ==
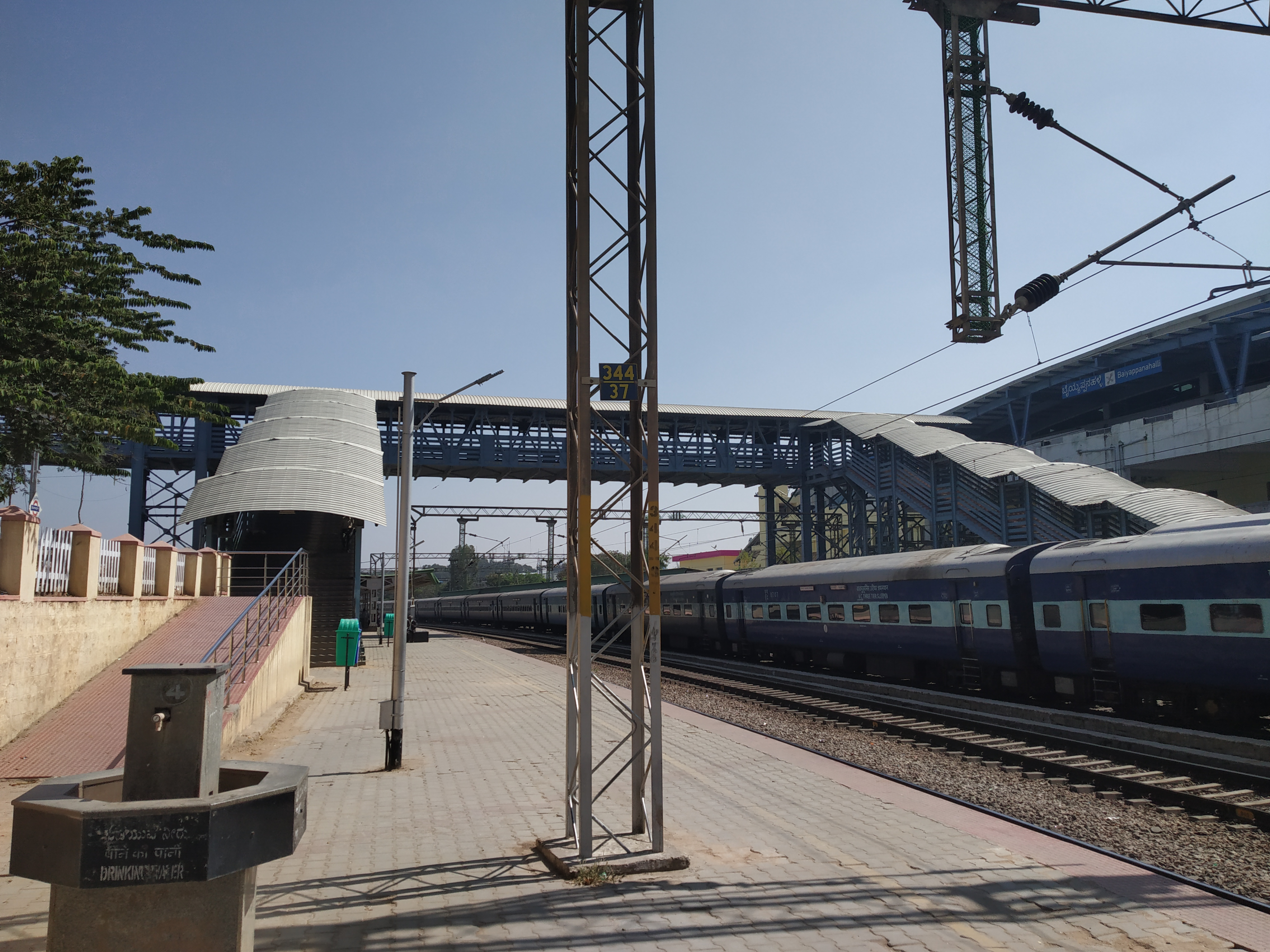
Platform 2 of this railway station

South Western Railway (SWR) developed Baiyyappanahalli, located on the eastern part of the city, as the third railway terminal for the city along with facilities in 2008 due to no space around the Bangalore City railway station. Work on a third coaching terminal has begun and is expected to be complete by March 2020. It is a Railway Junction, dividing the direct single electrified line to Salem via Hosur-Dharmapuri and the electrified double line towards Jolarpettai via Krishnarajapuram.

== Structure ==
Baiyyappanahalli railway station is designed to be a replica of the Terminal 1A building of the Kempegowda International Airport, located in the same city. The station has two platforms and 4 tracks each running to 650m in length along with shelters, lighting, benches and a booking office Facilities such as parking, footbridge or Skyway and toilets are available.

=== Station Layout ===
G	North Entrance Street level	Exit/Entrance & ticket counter
P	FOB, Side platform | P2 Doors will open on the left
P	Platform 2	Towards → Jolarpettai Junction next station is Krishnarajapuram
P	Track 2	Towards → Jolarpettai Junction / MGR Chennai Central (Express Lines)
P	Track 1	Towards ← KSR Bengaluru / Mysore Junction (Express Lines)
P	Platform 1	Towards ← KSR Bengaluru next station is Bengaluru East
P	FOB, Side platform | P1 Doors will open on the left
G	South Entrance Street level	Exit/Entrance & ticket counter

== See also ==
- Baiyyappanahalli
- Bengaluru Commuter Rail
- Baiyappanahalli metro station
- List of railway stations in India
