= Baiyappanahalli metro station =

Namma Metro's Purple Line metro station

Baiyappanahalli
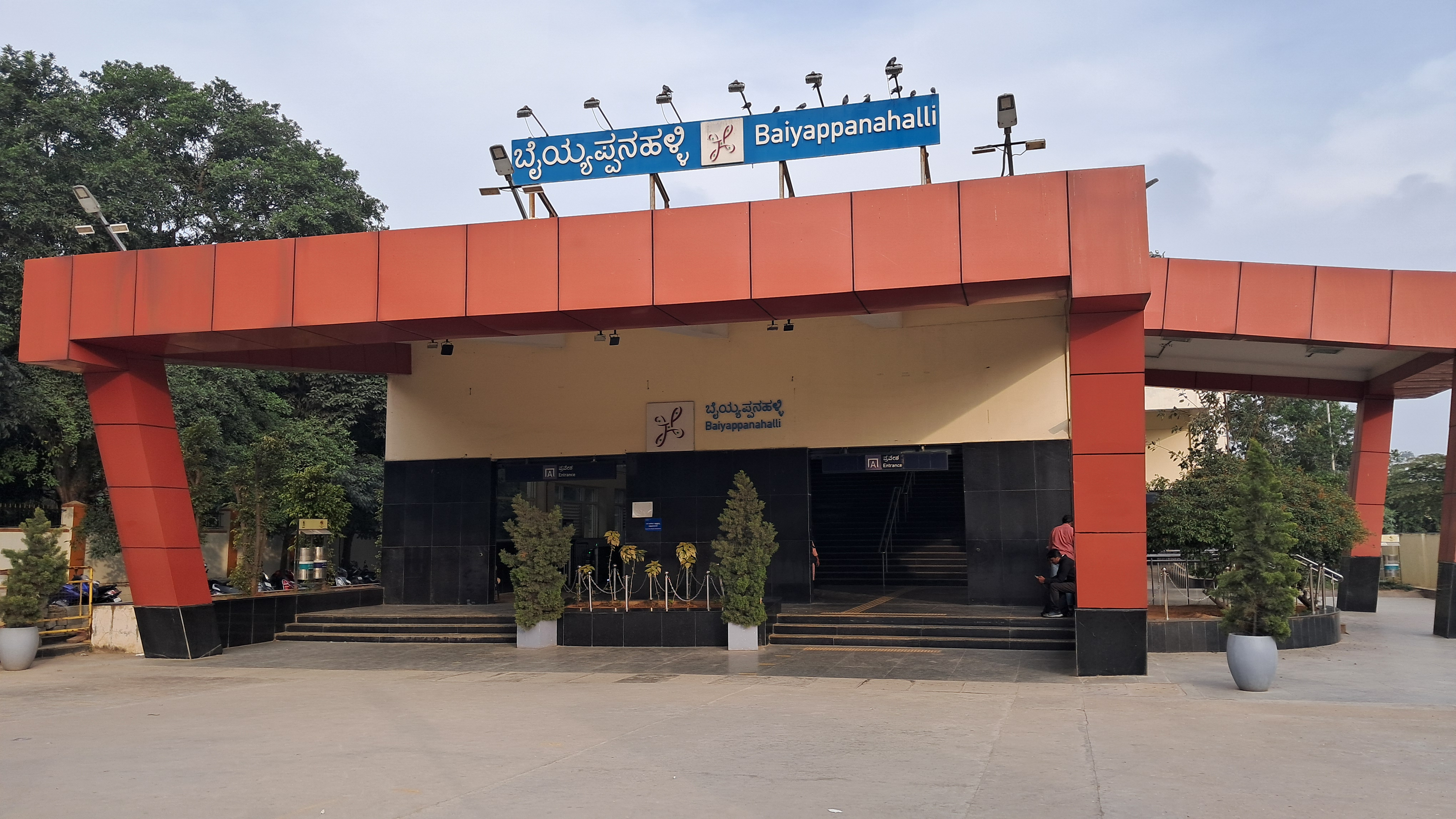
- Front Entrance as of November 2024

General information
- Other names: Baiyyappanahalli
- Location: NGEF Main Rd, Sadanandanagar, Bennigana Halli, Bengaluru, Karnataka 560033; India
- Coordinates: 12°59′27″N 77°39′09″E
- System: Namma Metro station
- Owner: Bangalore Metro Rail Corporation Ltd (BMRCL)
- Operator: Namma Metro
- Line: Purple Line
- Platforms: Side platform Platform-1 → Whitefield (Kadugodi); Platform-2 → Mysuru Road / Challaghatta; Island platform Platform-2 → Mysuru Road / Challaghatta; Platform-3 → Mysuru Road / Challaghatta (Operational to Mysuru Road during peak hours)
- Tracks: 3
- Connections: Baiyappanahalli

Construction
- Structure type: At-grade
- Platform levels: 2
- Parking: Paid parking
- Cycle facilities: Parking available
- Accessible: Yes
- Architect: IVRCL - I8CR JV

Other information
- Status: Staffed
- Station code: BYPH

History
- Opened: 20 October 2011; 14 years ago
- Electrified: 750 V DC third rail

Services
| Preceding station | Namma Metro | Following station |
|---|---|---|
| Benniganahalli towards Whitefield (Kadugodi) | Purple Line | Swami Vivekananda Road towards Mysuru Road or Challaghatta |
Route map
Location

Baiyappanahalli is an at-grade metro station on the East-West corridor of the Purple Line of Namma Metro in the Baiyyappanahalli neighbourhood, Bangalore, India. This was the eastern terminal of Purple Line until 9 October 2023, until it got extended to Whitefield (Kadugodi).

Baiyappanahalli was one of the first six metro stations to be opened to the public in October 2011. The first train departed towards Mahatma Gandhi Road from Baiyappanahalli. Adjacent to the metro station are also facilities such as an inspection bay and BMRCL offices to monitor and control train operations.

== Station layout ==
| G | Street Level | Exit/ Entrance |
| C | Concourse | Fare control, station agent, Metro Card vending machines, crossover |
| P | Side platform | Doors will open on the left |
| P | Platform 1 Eastbound | Towards → Whitefield (Kadugodi); Next Station: Benniganahalli |
| P | Platform 2 Westbound | Towards ← Mysuru Road / Challaghatta; Next Station: Swami Vivekananda Road |
| P | Island platform | P2 Doors will open on the left | P3 Doors will open on the right |
| P | Platform 3 Westbound | Towards ← Mysuru Road / Challaghatta; Next Station: Swami Vivekananda Road |
| P | Note: | (Towards Mysuru Road - Operational during peak hours) |

== Entry/Exits ==
There are 3 Entry/Exit points – A, B and C. Commuters can use either of the points for their travel.

- Entry/Exit point A: Towards Old Madras Road or towards Tin Factory side
- Entry/Exit point B: Towards Baiyappanahalli Railway Stn.
- Entry/Exit point C: Towards Ramamurthy Nagar side and towards this metro parking

== Facilities ==
BMRCL has constructed a skywalk from the Baiyappanahalli station to BMRCL's traffic integration area on the NGEF side (Kasturinagar). The commissioner of metro railway safety (Southern Circle) had given permission to construct the skywalk.

Initially, there were no toilets at Namma Metro stations, despite demand from commuters. The metro's first toilets were opened at Baiyappanahalli and Indiranagar stations on 21 June 2013.

=== Parking ===
Baiyappanahalli station has a 2600m^{2} asphalted parking area. It is being operated by Central Parking Services, under contract, until 2015. The parking lot can accommodate 100 four-wheel and 150 two-wheel vehicles. It was the first Namma Metro station to offer parking facilities.

== Connections ==
The metro station is connected with the Baiyyappanahali railway station of the Indian Railways network.

== Gallery ==
A couple of this metro station pictures are shown below:-

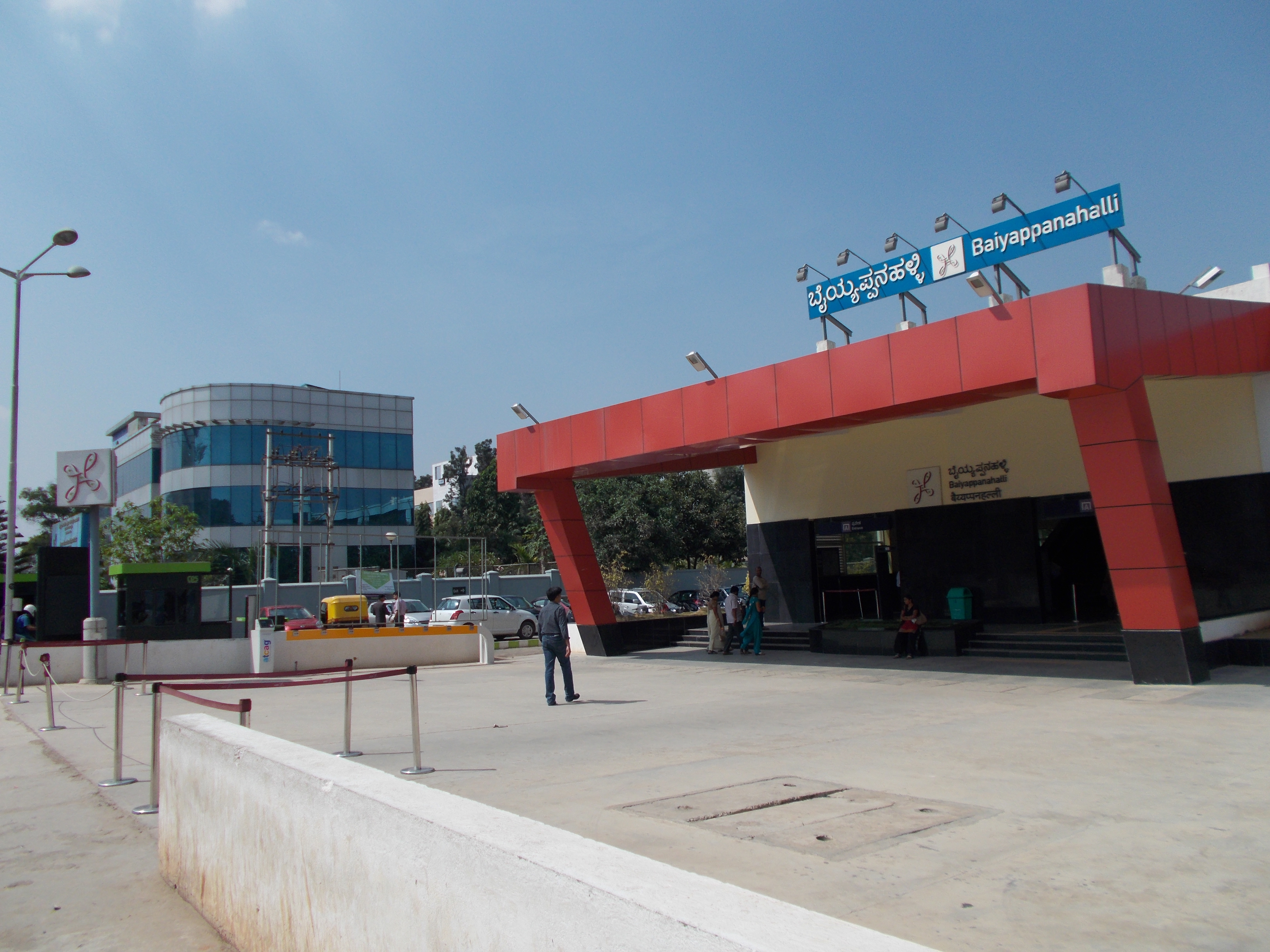
Front Entrance of this metro station

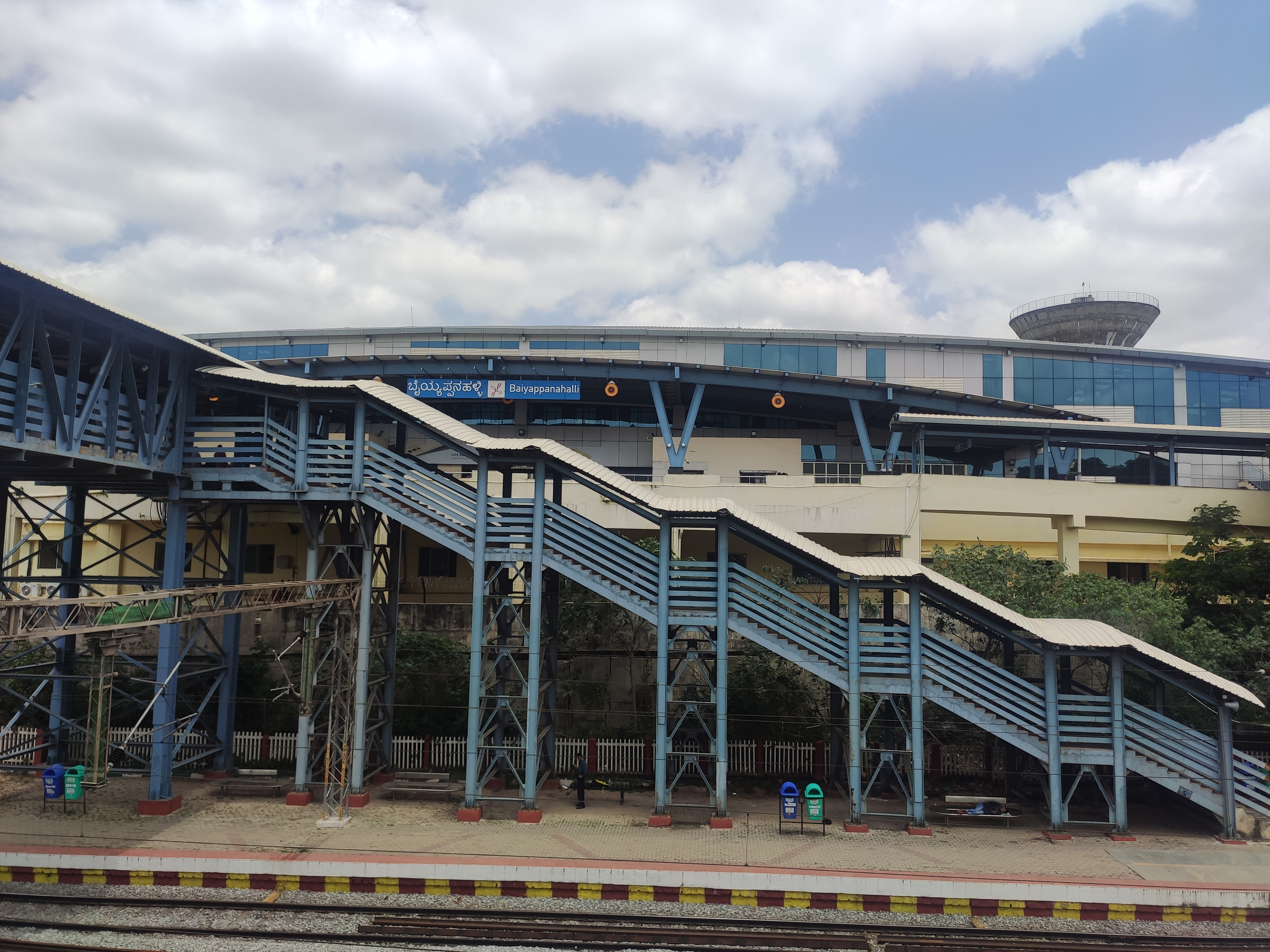
Metro station building adjacent to Baiyyappanahalli railway station

Back Entrance of this metro station

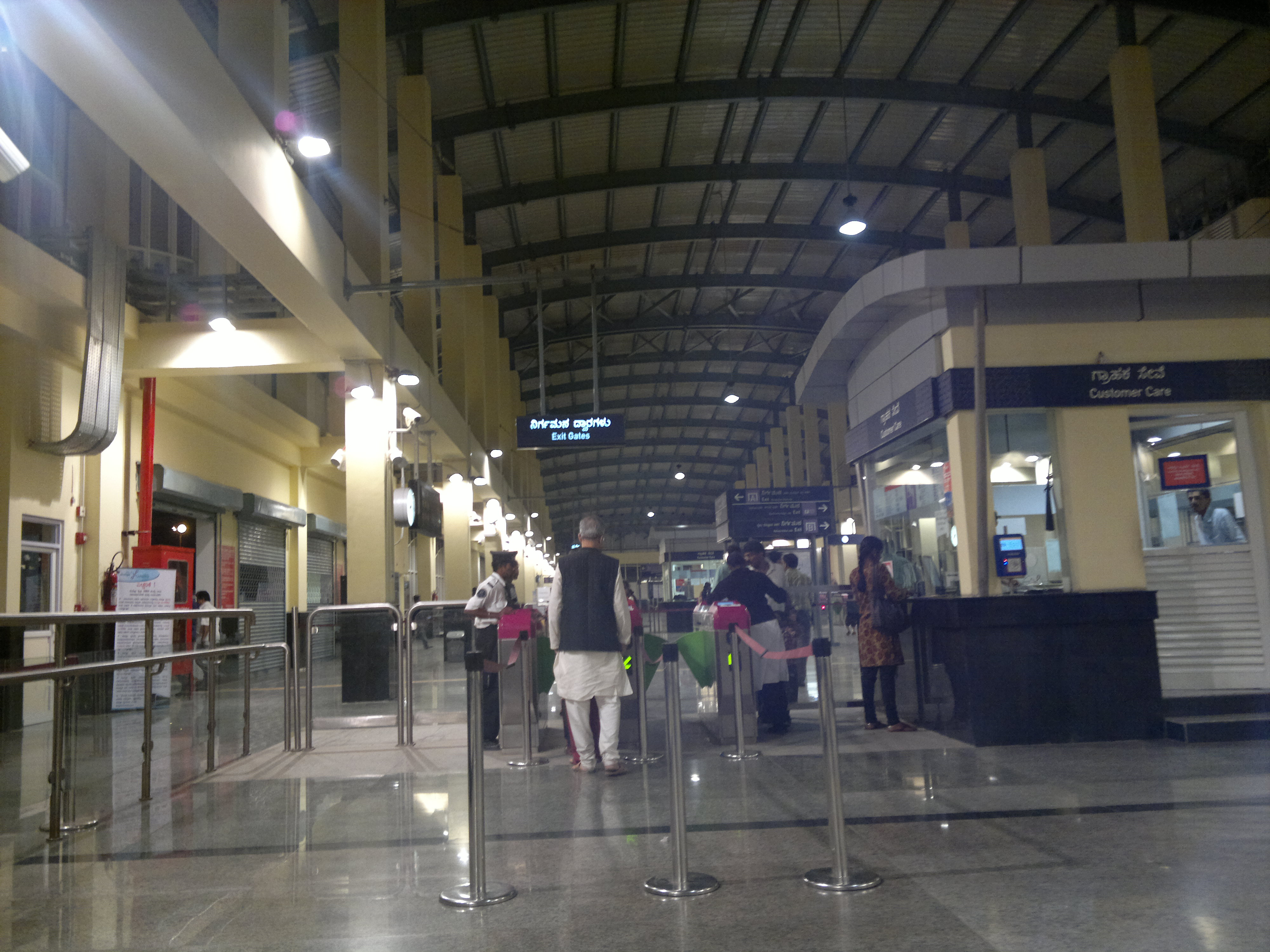
Concourse of this metro station

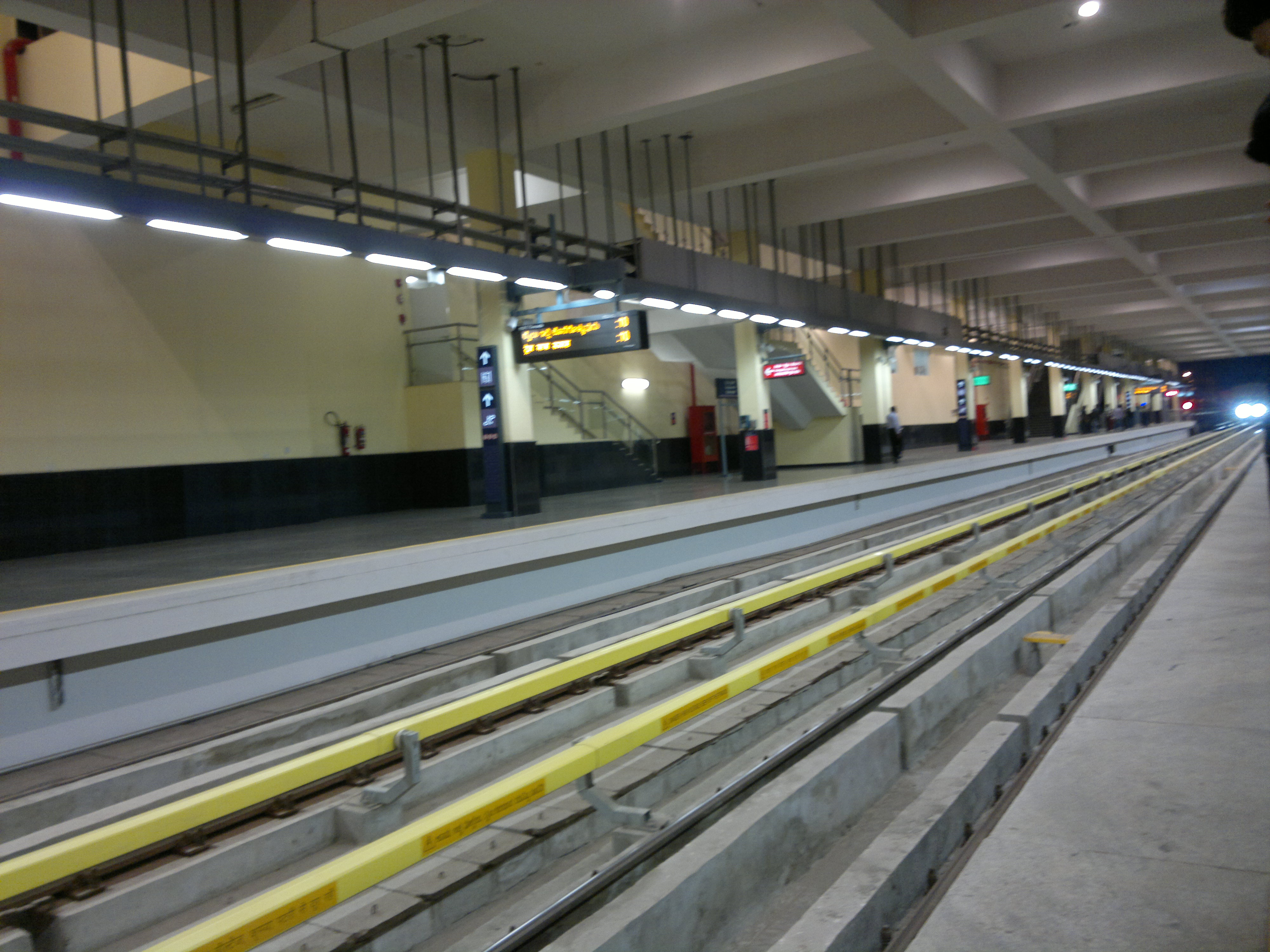
Platforms at this metro station

== See also ==
- Baiyyappanahalli
- Bangalore
- Baiyyappanahali railway station
- List of Namma Metro stations
- Transport in Karnataka
- List of metro systems
- List of rapid transit systems in India
- Bangalore Metropolitan Transport Corporation
