= HSR Layout metro station =

Upcoming Namma Metro station under Blue Line

HSR Layout
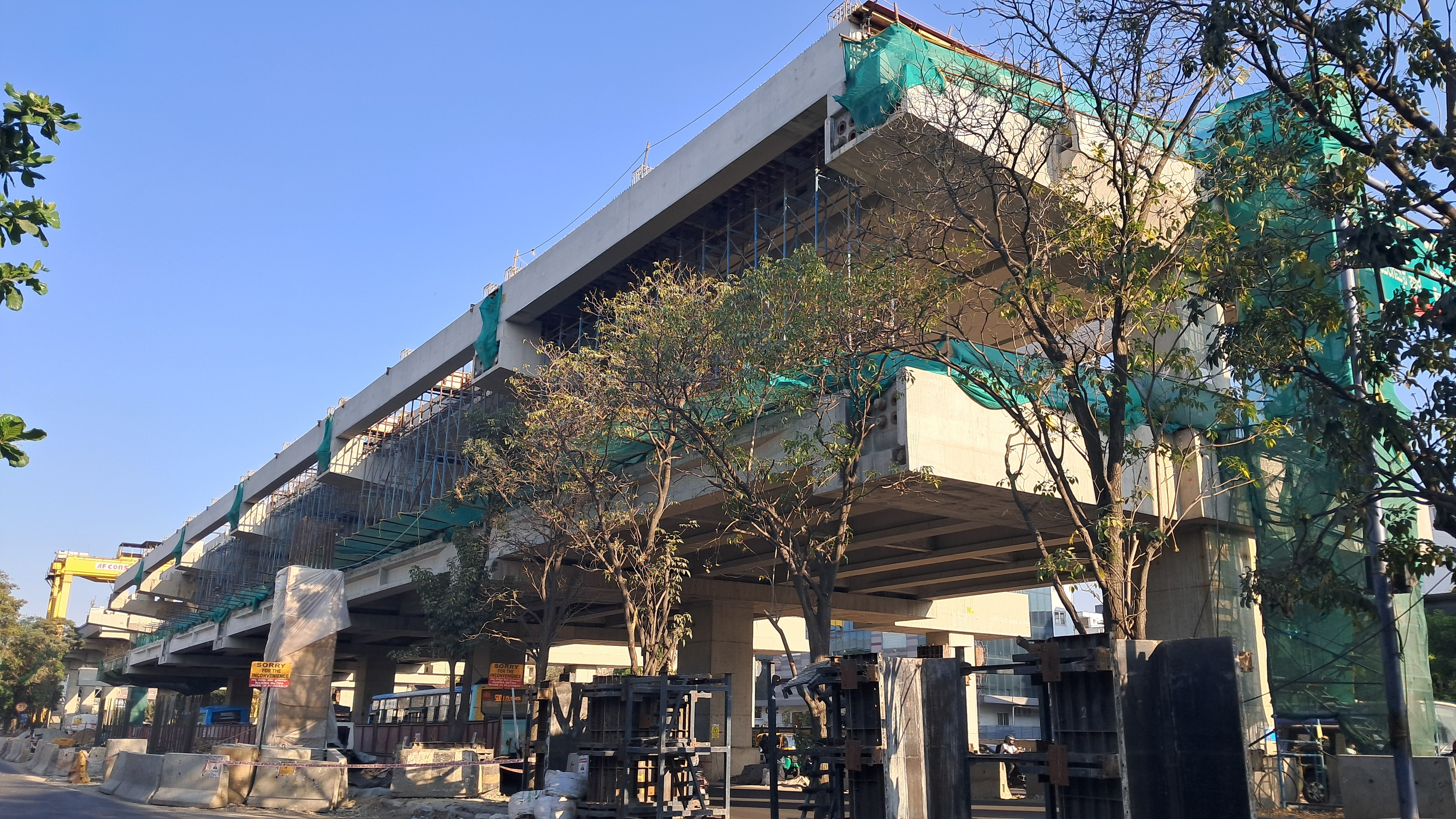
- Under Construction of this metro station as of March 2025 under Phase 2A of Blue Line of Namma Metro

General information
- Location: AH45, Sector 6, Koramangala, Bengaluru, Karnataka 560034
- Coordinates: 12.91649°N 77.63304°E
- System: Namma Metro station
- Owner: Bangalore Metro Rail Corporation Ltd (BMRCL)
- Operator: Namma Metro
- Line: Blue Line
- Platforms: Side platform (TBC); Platform-1 → Central Silk Board; Platform-2 → Krishnarajapura / KIAL Terminals; Platform Numbers (TBC)
- Tracks: 2 (TBC)

Construction
- Structure type: Elevated, Double track
- Platform levels: 2 (TBC)
- Parking: (TBC)
- Accessible: (TBC)

Other information
- Status: Under Construction
- Station code: (TBC)

History
- Opening: December 2026; 3 months' time (TBC)
- Electrified: (TBC)

Services
| Preceding station | Namma Metro | Following station |
|---|---|---|
| Central Silk Board Terminus | Blue Line (Future Service) | Agara towards Krishnarajapura or KIAL Terminals |
Route map
Location

HSR Layout is an upcoming elevated metro station on the North-South corridor of the Blue Line of Namma Metro in Bangalore, India. Around this metro station holds the main HSR Layout suburban area which divides into seven sectors consisting of main roads and cross roads inside the locality. This is a prime location for its neighbouring areas like Agara, Silk Board, Sarjapura and Madiwala. This metro station is slated to become operational around December 2026 instead of June 2026.

== History ==
In December 2019, the Bangalore Metro Rail Corporation Limited (BMRCL) invited bids for the construction of the HSR Layout metro station, part of the 9.859 km Reach 2A – Package 1 section (Central Silk Board - Kodibeesanahalli) of the 18.236 km Blue Line of Namma Metro. On 13 October 2020, Afcons Infrastructure was chosen as the lowest bidder for this segment, with their proposal closely matching the initial cost estimates. As a result, the contract was awarded to the company, which led to the beginning of the construction works of this metro station as per the agreed terms.

== Station layout ==
Station Layout - To Be Confirmed

| G | Street level | Exit/Entrance |
| L1 | Mezzanine | Fare control, station agent, Metro Card vending machines, crossover |
| L2 | Side platform | Doors will open on the left |
| L2 | Platform # Eastbound | Towards → Krishnarajapura ** Next Station: Agara; Change at the next station for Red Line |
| L2 | Platform # Westbound | Towards ← Central Silk Board; Change at the next station for Yellow Line |
| L2 | Side platform | Doors will open on the left |
| L2 | Note: | ** To be further extended to KIAL Terminals in future |

== See also ==
- Bangalore
- List of Namma Metro stations
- Transport in Karnataka
- List of metro systems
- List of rapid transit systems in India
- Bangalore Metropolitan Transport Corporation
