= Agara metro station =

Upcoming Namma Metro interchange station for Blue and Red Lines

Agara
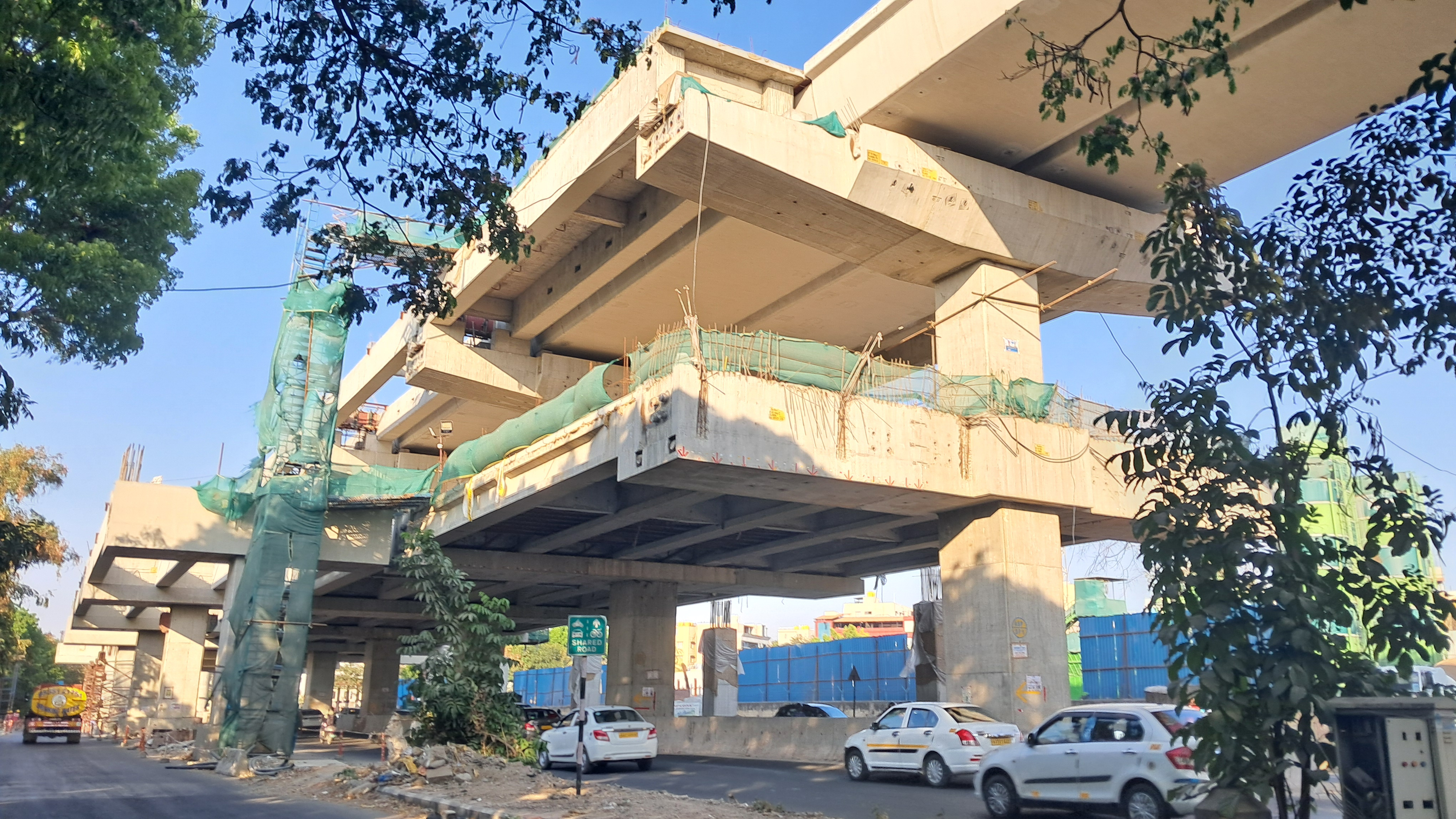
- Under Construction of this metro station as of March 2025 under Phase 2A of Blue Line of Namma Metro

General information
- Location: AH45, Agara Village, 1st Sector, HSR Layout, Bengaluru, Karnataka 560034
- Coordinates: 12.92053°N 77.64359°E
- System: Namma Metro station
- Owner: Bangalore Metro Rail Corporation Ltd (BMRCL)
- Operator: Namma Metro
- Lines: Blue Line; Red Line (Under Construction)
- Platforms: Side platform (TBC); Platform-1 → Central Silk Board; Platform-2 → Krishnarajapura / KIAL Terminals; Side platform (TBC); Platform-3 → Hebbala; Platform-4 → Sarjapura; Platform Numbers (TBC)
- Tracks: 2 (TBC)
- Connections: Agara BMTC Bus Terminus

Construction
- Structure type: Elevated, Double track
- Platform levels: 2 (TBC)
- Parking: (TBC)
- Accessible: (TBC)

Other information
- Status: Under Construction; Under Construction
- Station code: AGRA (TBC)

History
- Opening: December 2026; 24 days' time (TBC); 2030; 4 years' time (TBC)
- Electrified: (TBC)

Services
Preceding station	Namma Metro	Following station
HSR Layout towards Central Silk Board	Blue Line (Future Service)	Ibbaluru towards Krishnarajapura or KIAL Terminals
Jakkasandra towards Hebbala	Red Line (Under Construction)	Ibbaluru towards Sarjapura
Route map
Location

Agara is an upcoming elevated metro station on the North-South corridor of the Blue Line and proposed Red Line of Namma Metro in Bangalore, India. Around this metro station holds the main Agara, a major suburban area which was operated by the Madras Engineer Groups and was one of the biggest army cantonments during the British Times. This metro station is adjacent to its neighbouring localities like HSR Layout, Koramangala, Outer Ring Road and Varthur. This metro station (under Blue Line) is slated to become operational December 2026 instead of June 2026.

== History ==
=== Blue Line ===
In December 2019, the Bangalore Metro Rail Corporation Limited (BMRCL) invited bids for the construction of the Agara metro station, part of the 9.859 km Reach 2A – Package 1 section (Central Silk Board – Kodibeesanahalli) of the 18.236 km Blue Line of Namma Metro. On 13 October 2020, Afcons Infrastructure was chosen as the lowest bidder for this segment, with their proposal closely matching the initial cost estimates. As a result, the contract was awarded to the company, which led to the beginning of the construction works of this metro station as per the agreed terms.

== Station layout ==
Blue Line Station Layout – To Be Confirmed

G	Street level	Exit/Entrance
L1	Mezzanine	Fare control, station agent, Metro Card vending machines, crossover
L2	Side platform | Doors will open on the left
L2	Platform # Eastbound	Towards → Krishnarajapura ** Next Station: InMobi Ibbalur; Change at the next station for Red Line
L2	Platform # Westbound	Towards ← Central Silk Board; Next Station: HSR Layout
L2	Side platform | Doors will open on the left
L2	Note:	** To be further extended to KIAL Terminals in future

Red Line Station Layout – To Be Confirmed

G	Street level	Exit/Entrance
L1	Mezzanine	Fare control, station agent, Metro Card vending machines, crossover
L2	Side platform | Doors will open on the left
L2	Platform # Southbound	Towards → Sarjapura; Next Station: InMobi Ibbaluru; Change at the next station for Blue Line
L2	Platform # Northbound	Towards ← Hebbala; Next Station: Jakkasandra
L2	Side platform | Doors will open on the left
L2

== See also ==
- Bangalore
- List of Namma Metro stations
- Transport in Karnataka
- List of metro systems
- List of rapid transit systems in India
- Bangalore Metropolitan Transport Corporation
