= Kodigehalli metro station =

Upcoming Namma Metro station under Blue Line

Kodigehalli
- View of the construction of Kodigehalli Metro Station on Namma Metro's Blue Line in September 2026.

General information
- Location: Kodigehalli Gate Amruthnagar, Byatarayanapura, Bengaluru, Karnataka 560092
- Coordinates: 13.05702°N 77.59386°E
- System: Namma Metro station
- Owner: Bangalore Metro Rail Corporation Ltd (BMRCL)
- Operator: Namma Metro
- Line: Blue Line
- Platforms: Island platform (TBC); Platform-1 → Hebbala * Platform-2 → KIAL Terminals; Platform Numbers (TBC) * (Further extension to Krishnarajapura / Central Silk Board in the future)
- Tracks: 2 (TBC)

Construction
- Structure type: Elevated, Double track
- Platform levels: 2 (TBC)
- Parking: (TBC)
- Accessible: (TBC)

Other information
- Status: Under Construction
- Station code: (TBC)

History
- Opening: June 2027; 8 months' time (TBC)
- Electrified: (TBC)

Services
| Preceding station | Namma Metro | Following station |
|---|---|---|
| Hebbala Terminus | Blue Line (Operational around June 2027) | Jakkur Cross towards KIAL Terminals |
| Hebbala towards Krishnarajapura or Central Silk Board | Blue Line (Operational around December 2027) | Jakkur Cross towards KIAL Terminals |
Route map
Location

Kodigehalli is an upcoming important elevated metro station on the north–south corridor of the Blue Line of Namma Metro in Bangalore, India. This metro station will mainly serve the Brigade Corporate Offices, consisting of Magnum, Opus, Triumph and Caladium. It also serves prime locations including Aster CMI Hospital, Amruthahalli Lake Park, Godrej Woodsman Estate, RMZ Latitude and many restaurants for the general public. This metro station is slated to be operational around June 2027.

== History ==
On November 17, 2020, the Bangalore Metro Rail Corporation Limited (BMRCL) invited bids for the construction of the Kodigehalli metro station, part of the 11.678 km Reach 2B – Package 2 (Hebbala - Bagalur Cross) of the 37.692 km Blue Line of Namma Metro. On September 14, 2021, Nagarjuna Construction Company Ltd. (NCC Ltd.) was chosen as the lowest bidder for this segment, with their proposal closely matching the initial cost estimates. As a result, the contract was awarded to the company, which led to the beginning of the construction works of this metro station as per the agreed terms.

== Station layout ==
Station Layout - To Be Confirmed

| G | Street level | Exit/Entrance |
| L1 | Mezzanine | Fare control, station agent, Ticket/token, shops |
| L2 | Platform # Northbound | Towards → KIAL Terminals; Next Station: Jakkur Cross |
| L2 | Island platform | Doors will open on the right |
| L2 | Platform # Southbound | Towards ← Hebbala ** Change at the next station for Orange Line or Red Line |
| L2 | Note: | ** To be further extended to Krishnarajapura / Central Silk Board in the future |

== See also ==
- Bangalore
- List of Namma Metro stations
- Transport in Karnataka
- List of metro systems
- List of rapid transit systems in India
- Bangalore Metropolitan Transport Corporation
