= Bellandur metro station =

Upcoming Namma Metro station under Blue Line

Prestige Bellandur
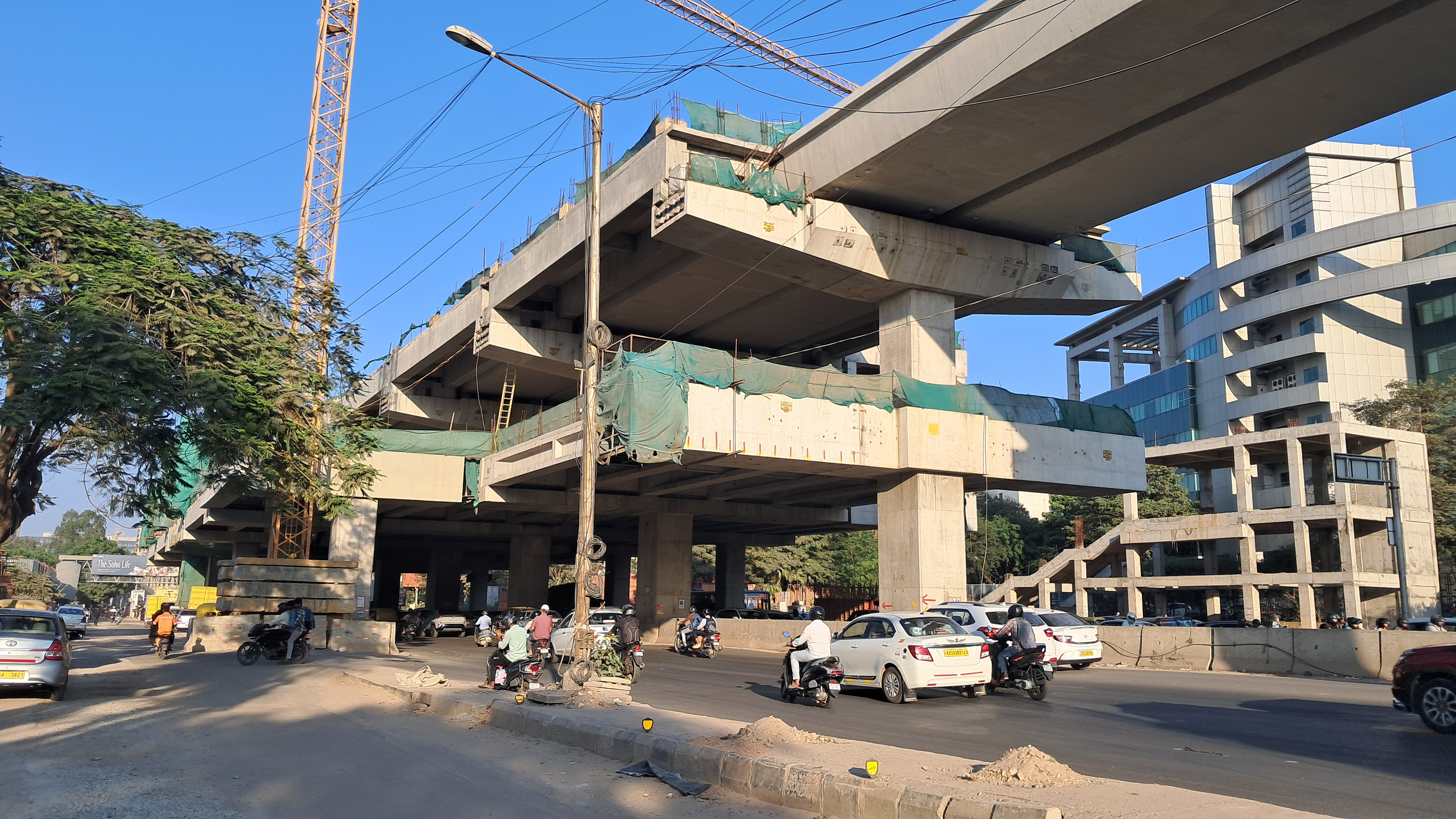
- Under Construction of this metro station as of March 2025 under Phase 2A of Blue Line of Namma Metro

General information
- Location: Bellandur Gate Rd, near Ecospace, Adarsh Palm Retreat, Bellandur, Bengaluru, Karnataka 560103
- Coordinates: 12.92799°N 77.68077°E
- System: Namma Metro station
- Owner: Bangalore Metro Rail Corporation Ltd (BMRCL)
- Operator: Namma Metro
- Line: Blue Line
- Platforms: Side platform (TBC); Platform-1 → Central Silk Board; Platform-2 → Krishnarajapura / KIAL Terminals; Platform Numbers (TBC)
- Tracks: 2 (TBC)

Construction
- Structure type: Elevated, Double track
- Platform levels: 2 (TBC)
- Parking: (TBC)
- Accessible: (TBC)

Other information
- Status: Under Construction
- Station code: BLDR (TBC)

History
- Opening: December 2026; 24 days' time (TBC)
- Electrified: (TBC)

Services
Preceding station	Namma Metro	Following station
Ibbaluru towards Central Silk Board	Blue Line (Future Service)	Kadubeesanahalli towards Krishnarajapura or KIAL Terminals
Route map
Location

Prestige Bellandur (formerly known as Bellandur) is an important upcoming elevated metro station on the North-South corridor of the Blue Line of Namma Metro in Bangalore, India. This metro station serves mainly the Bellandur suburban area, which comprises Bellandur Lake in addition to many technology firms such as Intel, RMZ Ecoworld and Embassy TechVillage.This metro station is slated to become operational December 2026 instead of June 2026.

== History ==
In December 2019, the Bangalore Metro Rail Corporation Limited (BMRCL) invited bids for the construction of the Bellandur metro station, part of the 9.859 km Reach 2A – Package 1 section (Central Silk Board - Kodibeesanahalli) of the 18.236 km Blue Line of Namma Metro. On 13 October 2020, Afcons Infrastructure was chosen as the lowest bidder for this segment, with their proposal closely matching the initial cost estimates. As a result, the contract was awarded to the company, which led to the beginning of the construction works of this metro station as per the agreed terms.

=== Naming rights ===
In February 2026, Bangalore Metro Rail Corporation Limited signed a station sponsorship deal for this upcoming metro station as part of Phase 2A of Blue Line. As part of this scheme, Prestige Group agreed to invest around ₹120 crore to facilitate the construction process and enhance passenger facilities.

In this deal, the company was granted the right to use the name of the station for 30 years, and the station will be named Prestige Bellandur Metro Station. The deal also provides limited commercial and advertising space in the station and the possibility of developing connectivity with nearby business development sites.

This is part of BMRCL’s efforts to develop metro infrastructure and passenger experience through public-private partnerships along the Outer Ring Road corridor.

== Station layout ==
Station Layout - To Be Confirmed

G	Street level	Exit/Entrance
L1	Mezzanine	Fare control, station agent, Metro Card vending machines, crossover
L2	Side platform | Doors will open on the left
L2	Platform # Northbound	Towards → Krishnarajapura ** Next Station: Embassy TechVillage Devarabeesanahalli
L2	Platform # Southbound	Towards ← Central Silk Board; Next Station: InMobi Ibbalur; Change at the next station for Red Line
L2	Side platform | Doors will open on the left
L2	Note:	** To be further extended to KIAL Terminals in future

== See also ==
- Bangalore
- List of Namma Metro stations
- Transport in Karnataka
- List of metro systems
- List of rapid transit systems in India
- Bangalore Metropolitan Transport Corporation
