= Jakkur Cross metro station =

Upcoming Namma Metro station under Blue Line

Jakkur Cross
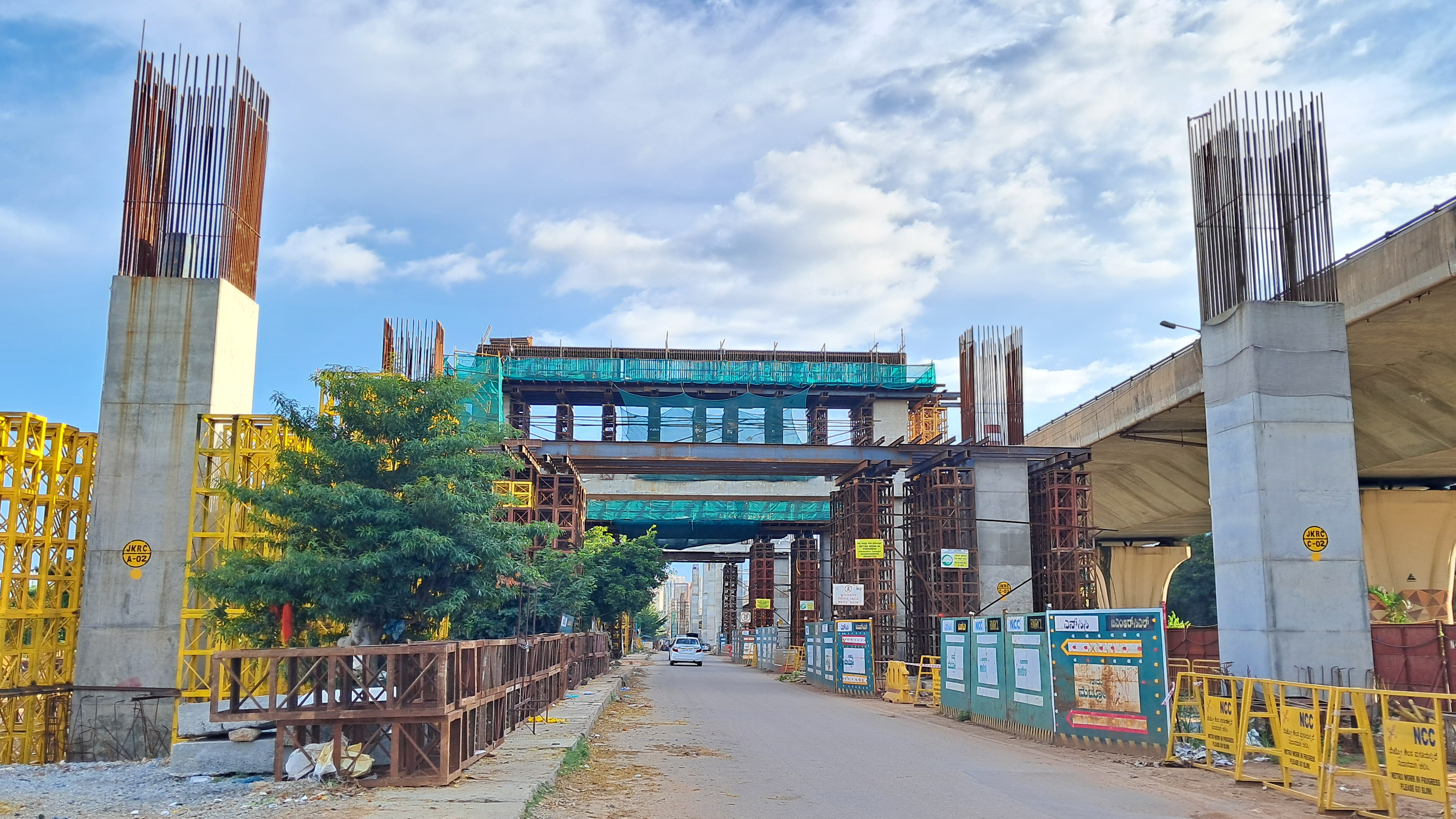
- Under construction of this metro station as of October 2024 under Phase 2B of Blue Line of Namma Metro

General information
- Location: Jakkuru Layout, Byatarayanapura, Bengaluru, Karnataka 560092
- Coordinates: 13.07038°N 77.59347°E
- System: Namma Metro station
- Owner: Bangalore Metro Rail Corporation Ltd (BMRCL)
- Operator: Namma Metro
- Line: Blue Line
- Platforms: Island platform (TBC); Platform-1 → Hebbala * Platform-2 → KIAL Terminals; Platform Numbers (TBC) * (Further extension to Krishnarajapura / Central Silk Board in the future)
- Tracks: 2 (TBC)
- Connections: Kodigehalli railway station

Construction
- Structure type: Elevated, Double track
- Platform levels: 2 (TBC)
- Parking: (TBC)
- Accessible: (TBC)

Other information
- Status: Under Construction
- Station code: JKRC (TBC)

History
- Opening: June 2027; 9 months' time (TBC)
- Electrified: (TBC)

Services
Preceding station	Namma Metro	Following station
Kodigehalli towards Hebbala	Blue Line (Operational around June 2027)	Yelahanka towards KIAL Terminals
Kodigehalli towards Krishnarajapura or Central Silk Board	Blue Line (Operational around December 2027)	Yelahanka towards KIAL Terminals
Train services bound for KIAL Terminals will skip Jakkur Plantation and proceed towards Yelahanka
Route map
Location

Jakkur Cross is an upcoming elevated metro station on the North-South corridor of the Blue Line of Namma Metro in Bangalore, India. This metro station will consist of the main Phoenix Mall of Asia, Jakkur suburban area, Jakkur Aerodrome followed by many neighbouring areas like Kodigehalli, Jakkur Lake and Gandhi Krishi Vigyana Kendra, a Deemed-to-be-University in North Bengaluru, India. This metro station is slated to be operational around June 2027.

== History ==
On November 17 2020, the Bangalore Metro Rail Corporation Limited (BMRCL) invited bids for the construction of the Jakkur Cross metro station, part of the 11.678 km Reach 2B – Package 2 (Hebbala - Bagalur Cross) of the 37.692 km Blue Line of Namma Metro. On September 14 2021, Nagarjuna Construction Company Ltd. (NCC Ltd.) was chosen as the lowest bidder for this segment, with their proposal closely matching the initial cost estimates. As a result, the contract was awarded to the company, which led to the beginning of the construction works of this metro station as per the agreed terms.

== Station layout ==
Station Layout - To Be Confirmed

G	Street level	Exit/Entrance
L1	Mezzanine	Fare control, station agent, Ticket/token, shops
L2	Platform # Northbound	Towards → KIAL Terminals; Next Station: Yelahanka *
L2	Island platform | Doors will open on the right
L2	Platform # Southbound	Towards ← Hebbala ** Next Station: Kodigehalli
L2	Note:	* Skipping Jakkur Plantation - Future Station ** To be further extended to Krishnarajapura / Central Silk Board in the future

== See also ==
- Bangalore
- List of Namma Metro stations
- Transport in Karnataka
- List of metro systems
- List of rapid transit systems in India
- Bangalore Metropolitan Transport Corporation
