= Ibbaluru metro station =

Upcoming Namma Metro interchange station for Blue and Red Lines

InMobi Ibbaluru
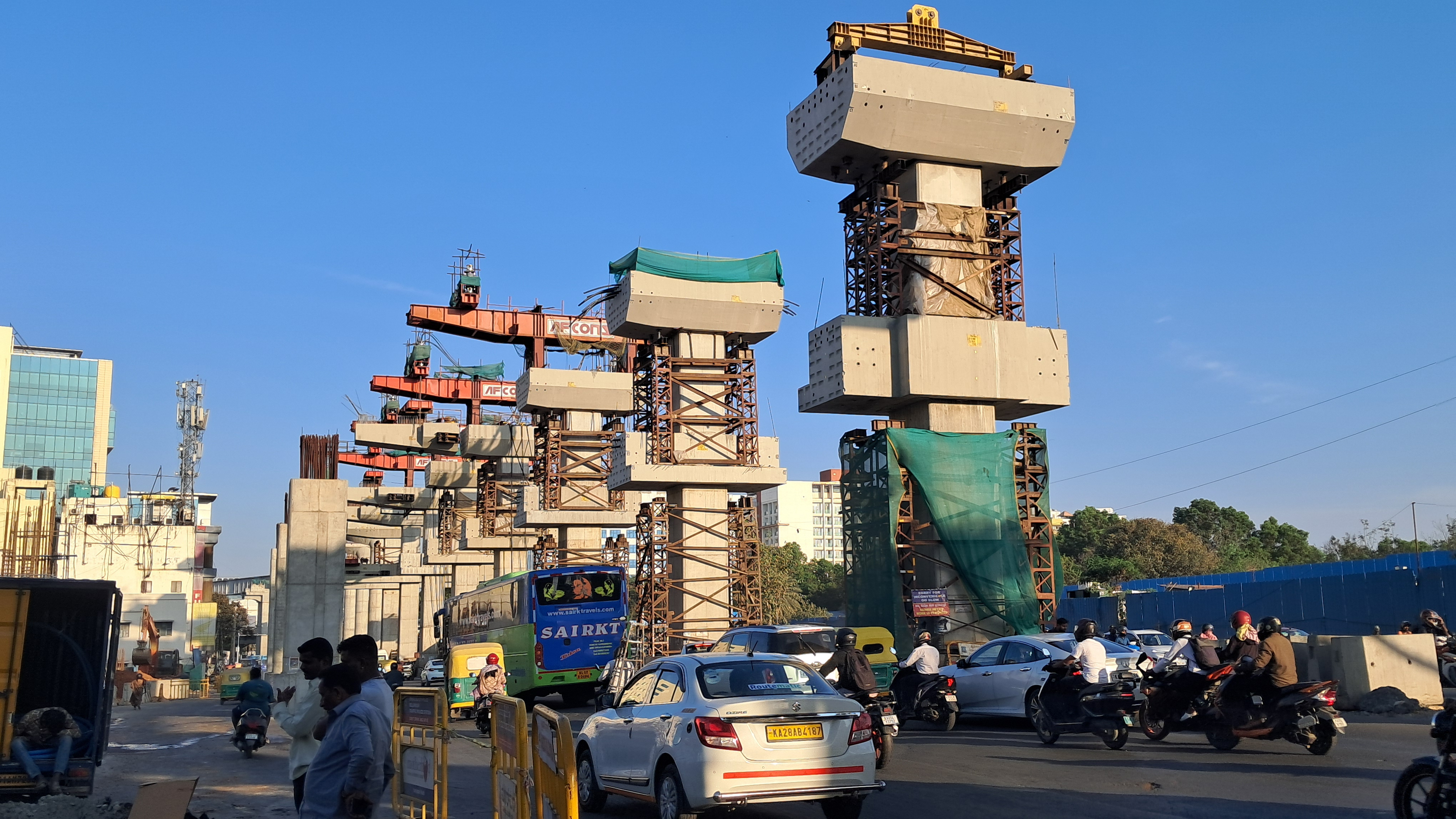
- Under Construction of this metro station as of March 2025 under Phase 2A of Blue Line of Namma Metro

General information
- Location: NH 44, Ibbaluru, Bellandur, Bengaluru, Karnataka 560102
- Coordinates: 12.92125°N 77.66250°E
- System: Namma Metro station
- Owner: Bangalore Metro Rail Corporation Ltd (BMRCL)
- Operator: Namma Metro
- Lines: Blue Line; Red Line (Under Construction)
- Platforms: Side platform (TBC); Platform-1 → Central Silk Board; Platform-2 → Krishnarajapura / KIAL Terminals; Side platform (TBC); Platform-3 → Hebbala; Platform-4 → Sarjapura; Platform Numbers (TBC)
- Tracks: 2 (TBC)

Construction
- Structure type: Elevated, Double track
- Platform levels: 2 (TBC)
- Parking: (TBC)
- Accessible: (TBC)

Other information
- Status: Under Construction; Under Construction
- Station code: BLDR (TBC)

History
- Opening: December 2026; 24 days' time (TBC); 2030; 4 years' time (TBC)
- Electrified: (TBC)

Services
Preceding station	Namma Metro	Following station
Agara towards Central Silk Board	Blue Line (Future Service)	Bellandur towards Krishnarajapura or KIAL Terminals
Agara towards Hebbala	Red Line (Under Construction)	Bellandur Gate towards Sarjapura
Route map
Location

InMobi Ibbaluru (formerly known as Ibbaluru) is an upcoming elevated metro station on the North-South corridor of the Blue Line of Namma Metro in Bangalore, India. The metro station is slated to become operational March 2027 instead of June 2026.

== History ==
=== Blue Line ===
In December 2019, the Bangalore Metro Rail Corporation Limited (BMRCL) invited bids for the construction of the metro station, part of the 8.377 km Reach 2A – Package 2 (Kodibeesanahalli - Krishnarajapura) of the 18.236 km Blue Line of Namma Metro. On 13 October 2020, Shankaranarayana Constructions (SNC) was chosen as the lowest bidder for this segment, with their proposal closely matching the initial cost estimates. As a result, the contract was awarded to the company, which led to the beginning of the construction works of this metro station as per the agreed terms.

=== Corporate partnership and naming rights ===
In November 2026, Bangalore Metro Rail Corporation Limited (BMRCL) signed a ₹65-crore Memorandum of Understanding (MoU) with Bengaluru-based technology company InMobi for the naming rights of this metro station on the Outer Ring Road (ORR) corridor of Namma Metro's Blue Line.

Under the agreement, the station will be named InMobi Ibbaluru Metro Station, with the company's contribution supporting construction and infrastructure development. The MoU was signed on 3 November 2026 by BMRCL Managing Director P.C. Jaffer and InMobi Global Senior Vice-President Subi Chaturvedi.

The station will serve as an interchange between the Blue Line and the approved and upcoming Red Line, improving connectivity to major IT employment hubs along the ORR. The partnership is part of BMRCL's efforts to generate non-fare revenue and encourage corporate participation in metro infrastructure development.

== Station layout ==
Station Layout - To Be Confirmed

G	Street level	Exit/Entrance
L1	Mezzanine	Fare control, station agent, Metro Card vending machines, crossover
L2	Side Platform | Doors will open on the left
L2	Platform # Eastbound	Towards → Krishnarajapura ** Next Station: Prestige Bellandur
L2	Platform # Westbound	Towards ← Central Silk Board; Next Station: Agara; Change at the next station for Red Line
L2	Side Platform | Doors will open on the left
L2	Note:	** To be further extended to KIAL Terminals in future

Red Line Station Layout - To Be Confirmed

G	Street level	Exit/Entrance
L1	Mezzanine	Fare control, station agent, Metro Card vending machines, crossover
L2	Side platform | Doors will open on the left
L2	Platform # Eastbound	Towards → Sarjapura; Next Station: Bellandur Gate
L2	Platform # Westbound	Towards ← Hebbala; Next Station: Agara; Change at the next station for Blue Line
L2	Side platform | Doors will open on the left
L2

== See also ==
- Namma Metro
  - Purple Line
  - Green Line
  - Yellow Line
  - Pink Line
  - Orange Line
  - Red Line
- List of Namma Metro Stations
- Rapid transit in India
- List of metro systems
