= Kempapura metro station =

Upcoming Namma Metro station under Blue Line & Orange Line

Kempapura
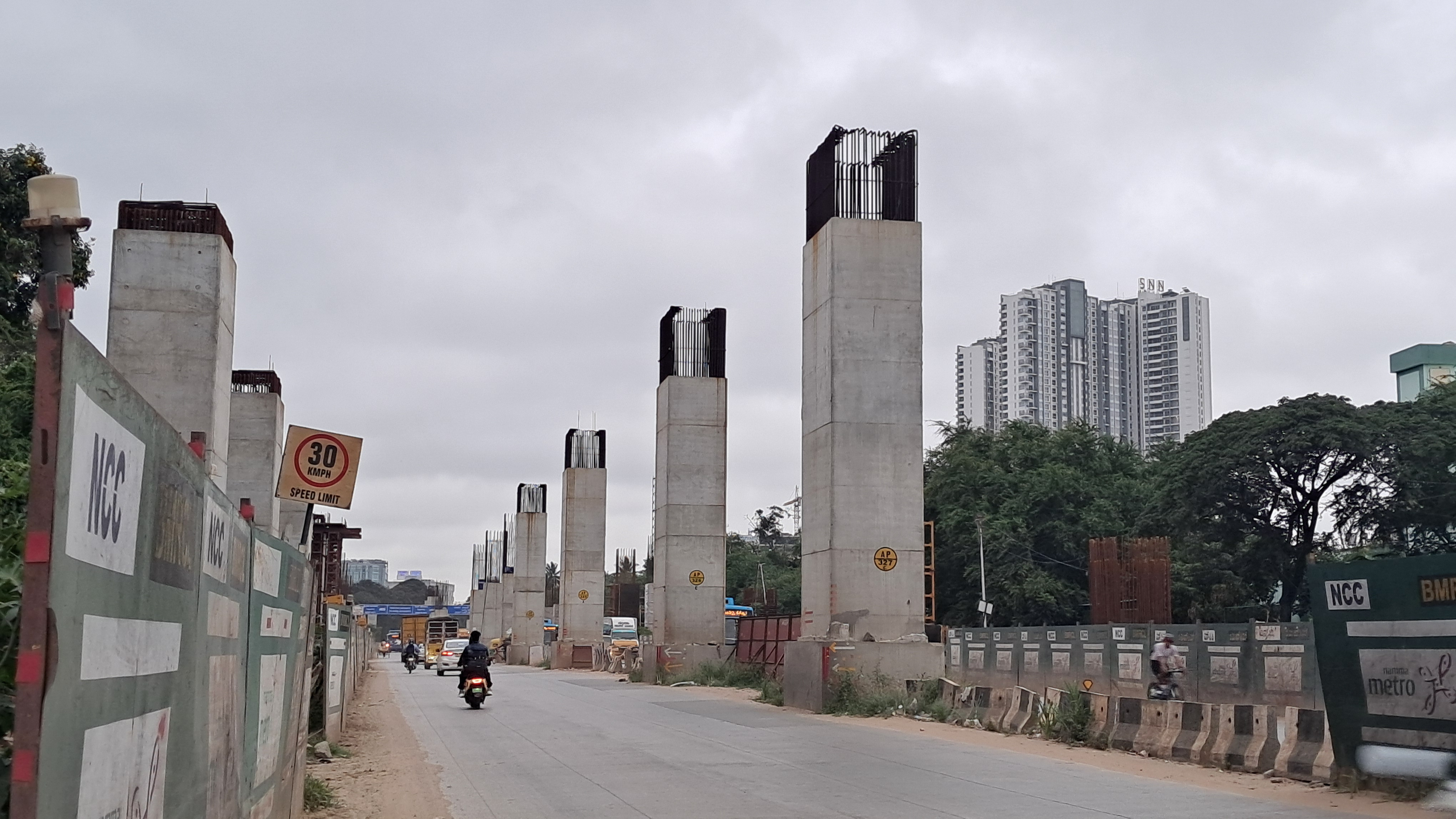
- Under Construction of this metro station under Phase 2B of Namma Metro's Blue Line as of August 2025

General information
- System: Namma Metro station
- Owner: Bangalore Metro Rail Corporation Ltd (BMRCL)
- Operator: Namma Metro
- Line: Blue Line Orange Line
- Platforms: Side platform (TBC); Platform-1 → Krishnarajapura / Central Silk Board; Platform-2 → KIAL Terminals; Side platform (TBC); Platform Numbers (TBC)
- Tracks: 2 (TBC)

Construction
- Structure type: Elevated, Double track
- Platform levels: 2 (TBC)
- Parking: (TBC)
- Accessible: (TBC)

Other information
- Status: Under Construction; Approved
- Station code: (TBC)

History
- Opening: December 2027; 12 months' time (TBC); 2029; 3 years' time (TBC)
- Electrified: (TBC)

Services
Preceding station	Namma Metro	Following station
Veerannapalya towards Krishnarajapura or Central Silk Board	Blue Line (Under Construction)	Hebbala towards KIAL Terminals
Hebbala towards N.S. Palya - JP Nagar 4th Phase	Orange Line (Future Service)	Terminus
Route map
Location

Kempapura is an upcoming elevated metro station on the north–south corridor of the Blue Line of Namma Metro in Bangalore, India. This metro station is stated to become operational around December 2026.

== History ==
=== Blue Line ===
On November 17 2020, the Bangalore Metro Rail Corporation Limited (BMRCL) invited bids for the construction of the Kempapura metro station, part of the 11 km Reach 2B – Package 1 (Krishnarajapura - Kempapura) of the 37.692 km Blue Line of Namma Metro. On September 14 2021, Nagarjuna Construction Company Ltd. (NCC Ltd.) was chosen as the lowest bidder for this segment, with their proposal closely matching the initial cost estimates. As a result, the contract was awarded to the company, which led to the beginning of the construction works of this metro station as per the agreed terms.

== Station layout ==
Blue Line and Orange Line Station Layout

G	Street Level	Exit / Entrance
C	Concourse	Fare control, station agent, Metro Card vending machines, crossover
P	Platform # Eastbound	Towards → Krishnarajapura / Central Silk Board; Next Station: Veerannapalya
P	Island platform | P# Doors will open on the right | P# Doors will open on the left
P	Platform # Eastbound	Towards → Train Terminates Here
P	Platform # Westbound	Towards ← N.S. Palya - J.P. Nagar 4th Phase; Next Station: Hebbala; Change at the next station for Blue Line or Red Line
P	Island platform | P# Doors will open on the left | P# Doors will open on the right
P	Platform # Westbound	Towards ← KIAL Terminals; Next Station: Hebbala; Change at the next station for Orange Line or Red Line
P
