= Kadubeesanahalli metro station =

Upcoming Namma Metro station under Blue Line

Embassy TechVillage Kadubeesanahalli
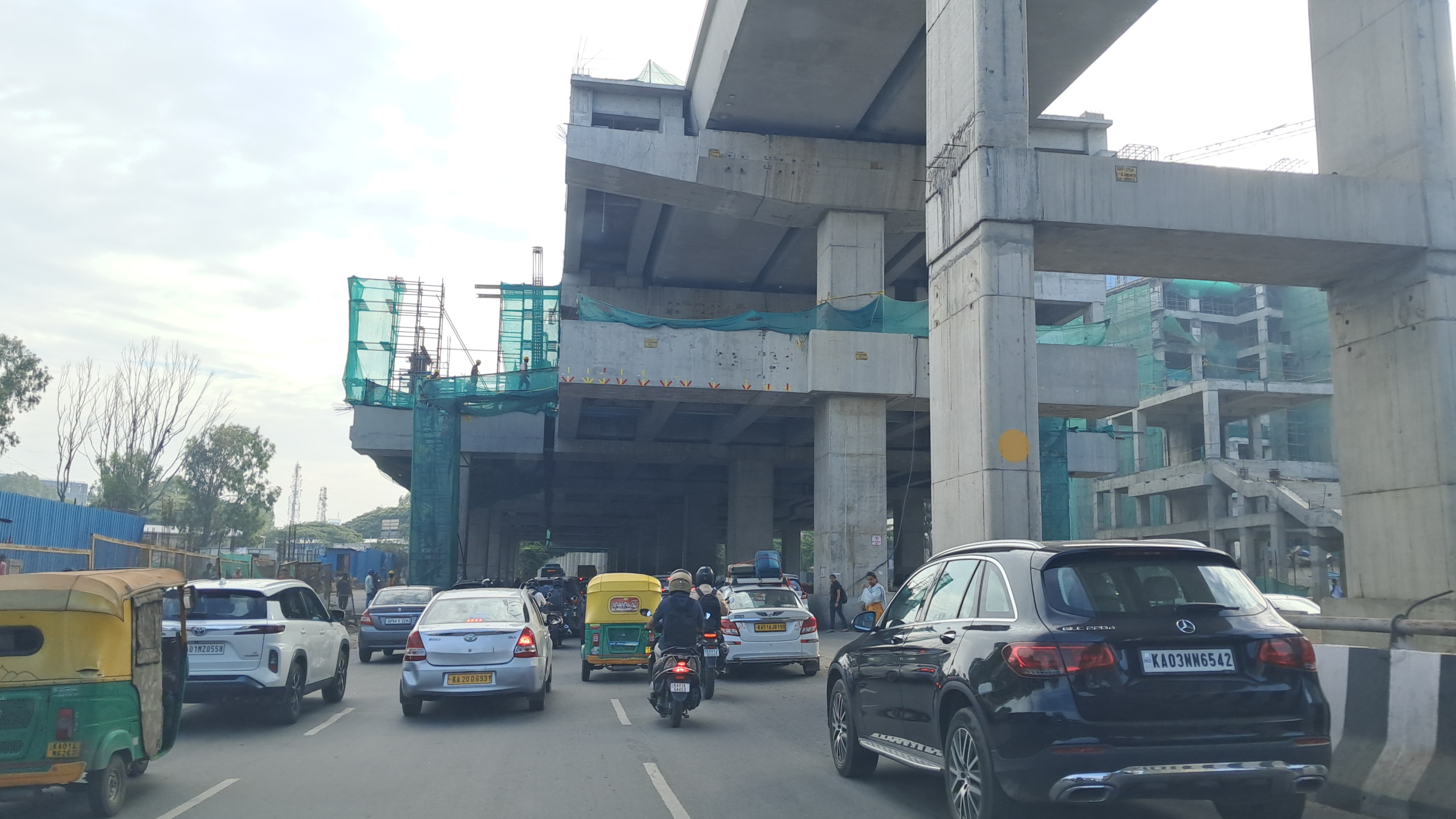
- Under Construction of this metro station as of April 2025 under Phase 2A of Blue Line of Namma Metro

General information
- Location: Kadubeesanahalli, Bengaluru, Karnataka 560103
- Coordinates: 12.93225°N 77.68761°E
- System: Namma Metro station
- Owner: Bangalore Metro Rail Corporation Ltd (BMRCL)
- Operator: Namma Metro
- Line: Blue Line
- Platforms: Side platform (TBC); Platform-1 → Central Silk Board; Platform-2 → Krishnarajapura / KIAL Terminals; Platform Numbers (TBC)
- Tracks: 2 (TBC)

Construction
- Structure type: Elevated, Double track
- Platform levels: 2 (TBC)
- Parking: (TBC)
- Accessible: (TBC)

Other information
- Status: Under Construction
- Station code: KDBH (TBC)

History
- Opening: December 2026; 3 months' time (TBC)
- Electrified: (TBC)
- Former names: Kadubeesanahalli

Services
Preceding station	Namma Metro	Following station
Bellandur towards Central Silk Board	Blue Line (Future Service)	Kodibeesanahalli towards Krishnarajapura or KIAL Terminals
Route map
Location

Embassy TechVillage Devarabeesanahalli (to be changed from Kadubeesanahalli to Devarabeesanahalli) is an upcoming elevated metro station on the North-South corridor of the Blue Line of Namma Metro in Bangalore, India. This metro station serves mainly Embassy TechnoVillage, which comprises IT companies such J.P. Morgan Chase, Cisco, Wells Fargo, New Horizon College of Engineering and Carmatec. This is a prime location for its neighbouring areas like Bellandur, Marathahalli, Ibbalur and HAL Aerospace Museum. This metro station is slated to become operational December 2026 instead of June 2026.

On February 28, 2025, Embassy Group (REIT) had signed a definitive agreement for the construction of this metro station under Blue Line of Namma Metro and registered its rights for 30 years subject to the approval from the State Government. This is the fourth metro station after KIAL Terminals (MoU with BIAL), Bettahalasuru (MoU with Embassy Group) and DRDO Sports Complex (MoU with Bagmane Tech Park).

== History ==
In December 2019, the Bangalore Metro Rail Corporation Limited (BMRCL) invited bids for the construction of the Embassy TechVillage Kadubeesanahalli metro station, part of the 9.859 km Reach 2A – Package 1 section (Central Silk Board - Kodibeesanahalli) of the 18.236 km Blue Line of Namma Metro. On 13 October 2020, Afcons Infrastructure was chosen as the lowest bidder for this segment, with their proposal closely matching the initial cost estimates. As a result, the contract was awarded to the company, which led to the beginning of the construction works of this metro station as per the agreed terms.

== Station layout ==
Station Layout - To Be Confirmed

G	Street level	Exit/Entrance
L1	Mezzanine	Fare control, station agent, Metro Card vending machines, crossover
L2	Side platform | Doors will open on the left
L2	Platform # Northbound	Towards → Krishnarajapura ** Next Station: Kadubeesanahalli
L2	Platform # Southbound	Towards ← Central Silk Board; Next Station: Prestige Bellandur
L2	Side platform | Doors will open on the left
L2	Note:	** To be further extended to KIAL Terminals in future

== See also ==
- Bangalore
- List of Namma Metro stations
- Transport in Karnataka
- List of metro systems
- List of rapid transit systems in India
- Bangalore Metropolitan Transport Corporation
