= RMZ =

Indian real estate company

- Type: Private
- Industry: Financial Services
- Founded: 2002
- Founder: Arjun Menda; Raj Menda; Manoj Menda
- Headquarters: Bengaluru, India
- Area served: India
- Key people: Arjun Menda (Group Chairman); Raj Menda (Chairman); Manoj Menda (Chairman)
- Products: Commercial offices, Industrial parks, Residential apartments, Mixed-use developments, Data centres
- Number of employees: 500+
- Website: www.rmz.com

RMZ is an Indian privately owned alternative asset company, headquartered in Bengaluru. The company has developed projects in Bengaluru, Chennai, Hyderabad, Delhi NCR, Pune, and Mumbai.

== History ==
RMZ was founded in 2002 by Arjun Menda and his sons, Raj and Manoj Menda, who were associated with the K Raheja Group, managing operations in the southern region during the late 1990s. RMZ executed its first project in Bangalore in 2002.

In 2012, RMZ introduced residential real estate projects such as Latitude, Saawan, and Galleria. In February 2012, it received a $100 million investment from private equity firm Baring Private Equity Partners (BPEP). Qatar Investment Authority (QIA) invested $300 million in RMZ in 2013, acquiring a 21% stake. In December 2015, the company acquired 0.8 million sq ft in Gurgaon from the real estate company BPTP for approximately $150 million.

In 2016, the company launched a co-working space business called CoWrks.

In 2018, RMZ acquired Essar Group's Equinox Business Park, a 1.25 million sq. ft office space in Mumbai's Bandra-Kurla Complex for around ₹2,400 crore. In the same year, the company repurchased shares from Qatar Investment Authority in a deal worth nearly $1 billion. In 2019, RMZ and DB Realty jointly acquired the Kamal Amrohi's film studio Kamalistan, located in Mumbai.

In January 2020, RMZ formed a US$1 billion joint venture with a Japanese real estate company Mitsui Fudosan to develop commercial projects in India. In August 2020, the company sold 18% of its commercial real estate and co-working business to Brookfield for $2 billion.

In April 2021, Canada Pension Plan Investment Board invested around $210 million in a joint venture with RMZ to develop and hold commercial office space in Chennai and Hyderabad. Later in March 2022, a second joint venture with the Canada Pension Plan Investment Board (CPPIB) was announced, in which CPPIB invested $355 million (around ₹2,650 crore) for the development of commercial projects in India.

In November 2024, RMZ expanded its operation including residential (RMZ Living), hospitality (RMZ Hospitality), mixed-use developments (RMZ Mixed-Use), industrial and logistics (RMZ NXT), office spaces (RMZ Office), and infrastructure (RMZ Infrastructure).

== CSR ==
RMZ Foundation is the CSR arm of the company, founded in 2015, led by Anu Menda as the managing trustee. The foundation operates with a focus on art, resilient communities, and urban innovation. The organization has installed artworks at RMZ Ecoworld, including sculptures by contemporary artists such as Subodh Gupta, Ravinder G Reddy, Dhruva Mistry, Paresh Maity, Arunkumar H G, and Jayasri Burman. In 2019, RMZ Foundation established the Sustainable Health Initiative, a business accelerator supporting healthcare startups.
