= Agara, Bengaluru =

Agara
- suburb
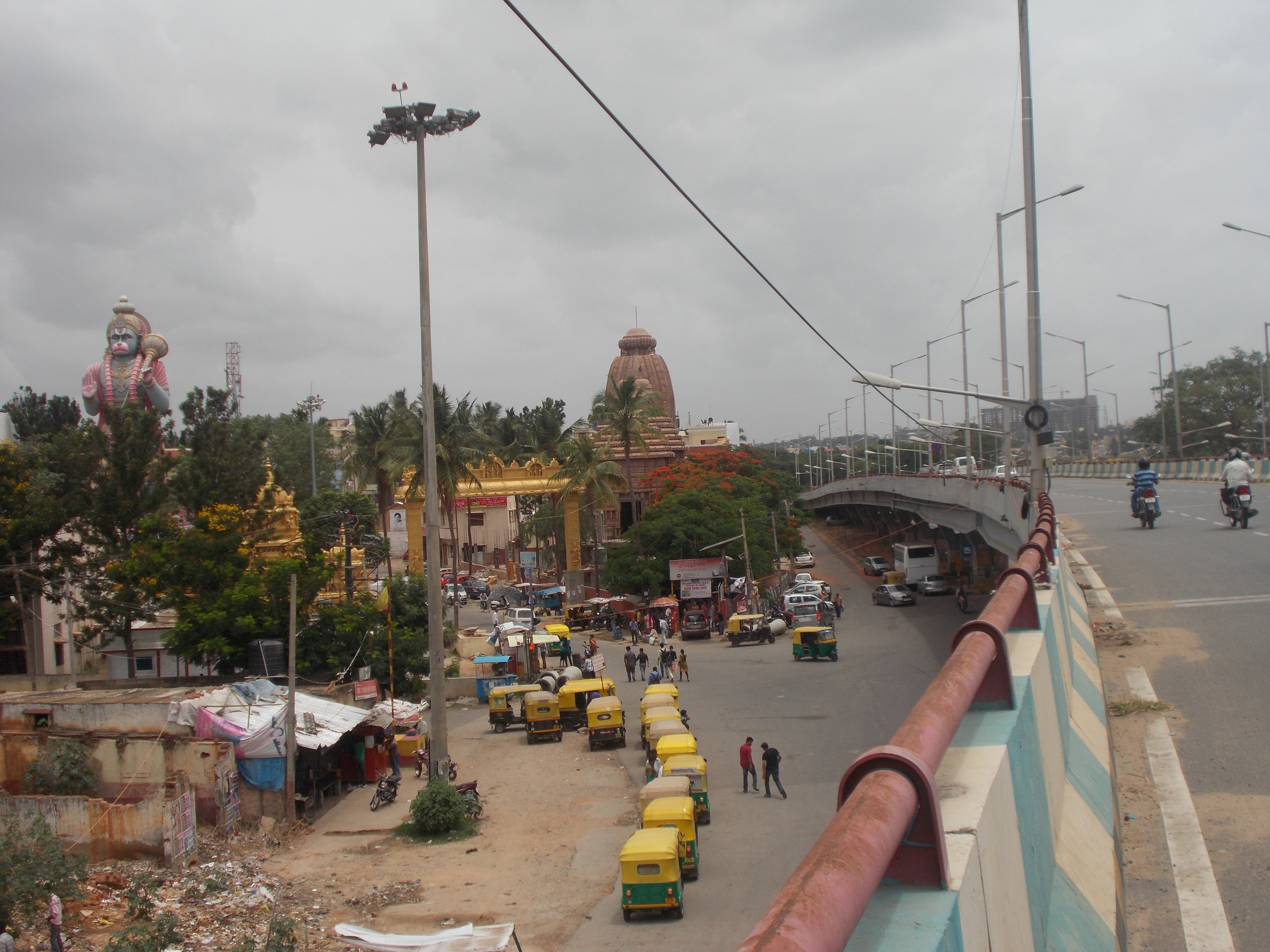
- Puri Jagannath's temple and huge Hanuman statue at Agara

- Location within Bengaluru
- Coordinates: 12°55′28″N 77°38′59″E
- Country: India
- State: Karnataka
- District: Bangalore Urban
- Metro: Bangalore
- Taluka: Bangalore South
- Established: 1806

Government
  - Body: BBMP

Languages
  - Official: Kannada
- Time zone: UTC+5:30 (IST)
- PIN: 560102
- Telephone code: 91-80
- Vehicle registration: KA 01
- Nearest city: Bangalore
- Lok Sabha constituency: Bangalore South
- Vidhan Sabha constituency: Bommanahalli
- Civic agency: Village Panchayat (formerly), now under BBMP

Agara, Bengaluru is a panchayat village in the southern state of Karnataka, India. It is located in the Bangalore South taluk of Bangalore Urban district in Karnataka, on Outer Ring Road, near Koramangala and HSR Layout. The Agara Bus Stop connects Koramangla with ITPL, Varthur, etc. Agara is notable for the Agara lake, as well as for being a locus of spiritual sites, containing temples dedicated to Shri Jagannatha, Shri Hanuman, Shri Ram and Sita as well as Radha-Krishna, Shiva-Parvati, Ayyapa, Durga Parmeshwari and Shri Lakshmi, as well as a Sunni mosque. The Abhayanjaneya Temple is particularly well known for its colossal statue of Hanuman which, remarkably, stands right next to the mosque. After winning the Shrirangapattan war, the British moved their army to Bangalore. During the British period, it was one of the biggest army cantonments in South Asia. Madras Engineer Groups operated from Agara.
