= N.S. Palya - JP Nagar 4th Phase metro station =

Upcoming Namma Metro interchange station for Pink and Orange Lines

N.S. Palya - JP Nagar 4th Phase
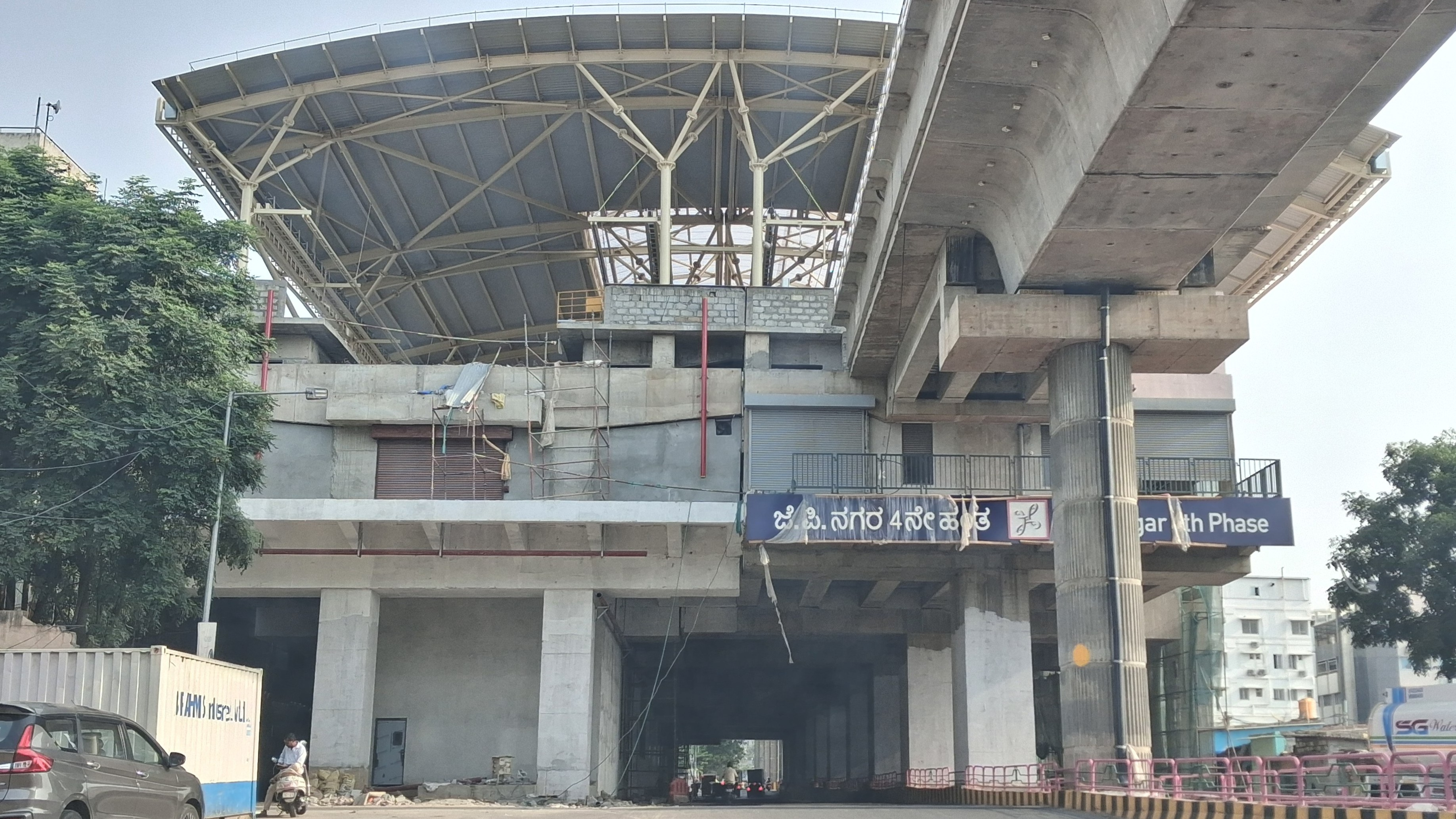
- This metro station's final stages before Operations under Namma Metro's Pink Line and the upcoming Orange Line as of April 2026

General information
- Location: Outer Ring Road, JP Nagar 4th Phase, Bengaluru, Karnataka 560078
- Coordinates: 12.909841°N 77.600237°E
- System: Namma Metro
- Owner: Bangalore Metro Rail Corporation Ltd (BMRCL)
- Operator: Namma Metro
- Line: Pink Line Orange Line
- Platforms: Side platform Platform-1 → S.G. Palya (Suddagunte Palya) * Platform-2 → Kalena Agrahara * (Further extension to Nagawara in the future) (TBC)
- Tracks: 4 (2 Operational under Pink Line and 2 Under Construction under Orange Line)

Construction
- Structure type: Elevated, Double track
- Platform levels: 2
- Parking: (TBC)
- Accessible: Yes
- Architect: GR Infraprojects Ltd. (Simplex contract terminated in 2021)

Other information
- Status: Staffed and Operational; Approved
- Station code: (TBC)

History
- Opened: 13 November 2026; 1 day ago (Inaugural run); 14 November 2026; 0 days ago (Commercial)
- Opening: 2029; 3 years' time (TBC)
- Electrified: 750 V DC third rail (Pink Line) (TBC) (Orange Line)
- Former names: JP Nagar 4th Phase

Services
Preceding station	Namma Metro	Following station
Jayadeva Hospital towards S.G. Palya (Suddagunte Palya)	Pink Line (Partially Operational)	Bilekahalli-I.I.M.B towards Kalena Agrahara
Jayadeva Hospital towards Nagawara	Pink Line (Operational around March 2027)	Bilekahalli-I.I.M.B towards Kalena Agrahara
Terminus	Orange Line (Approved)	JP Nagar 5th Phase towards Kempapura
Route map
Location

N.S. Palya - JP Nagar 4th Phase (formerly known as JP Nagar 4th Phase) is an elevated metro station on the North-South corridor of the Pink Line and will be an interchange station for the ORR-West corridor of the Orange Line and Pink Line of Namma Metro in Bengaluru, India. This station is located near the popular Vega City Mall and serves the residential areas of BTM Layout and JP Nagar 3rd & 4th Phase. This metro station will also act as the terminal station of the proposed Orange Line under Namma Metro Phase 3.

As per the latest updates, this metro station, under the first phase of Pink Line, which covers a total distance of 7.5 km elevated stretch (Kalena Agrahara - S.G. Palya (Suddagunte Palya)), was inaugurated by the honorable Prime Minister Narendra Modi on 13 November 2026.

== History ==
=== Pink Line ===
In March 2017, the Bangalore Metro Rail Corporation Limited (BMRCL) sought bids for building the N.S. Palya - JP Nagar 4th Phase metro station on the 7.5 km Kalena Agrahara - South Ramp section of the 21.25 km Pink Line of Namma Metro. This section comprises 5 stations, excluding Jayadeva Hospital, which was part of a joint venture between HCC - URC Constructions. Initially, Simplex Infrastructures won the tender in September 2017 but due to slow progress, their contract was terminated. In July 2021, GR Infraprojects became the lowest bidder and was awarded the Rs 364.87 Crore contract for this section. They commenced the construction of this metro station as per the agreement.

== Station layout ==
G	Street level	Exit/Entrance
L1	Mezzanine	Fare control, station agent, Metro Card vending machines, crossover
L2	Side platform | Doors will open on the left
L2	Platform 2 Southbound	Towards → Kalena Agrahara; Next Station: Bilekahalli-I.I.M.B
L2	Platform 1 Northbound	Towards ← S.G. Palya (Suddagunte Palya) ** Next Station: Jayadeva Hospital; Change at the next station for Yellow Line
L2	Island platform | P1 & P# doors will open on the left Orange Line - Platform Numbers (TBC)
L2	Platform # Southbound	Towards → Kempapura; Next Station: JP Nagar 5th Phase
L2	Platform # Northbound	Towards ← Train Terminates Here
L2	Side platform | Doors will open on the left
L2	Note:	** To be further extended to Nagawara in the future

== See also ==
- Bengaluru
- List of Namma Metro stations
- Transport in Karnataka
- List of metro systems
- List of rapid transit systems in India
- Bengaluru Metropolitan Transport Corporation
