= HSR Layout =

- Neighbourhood
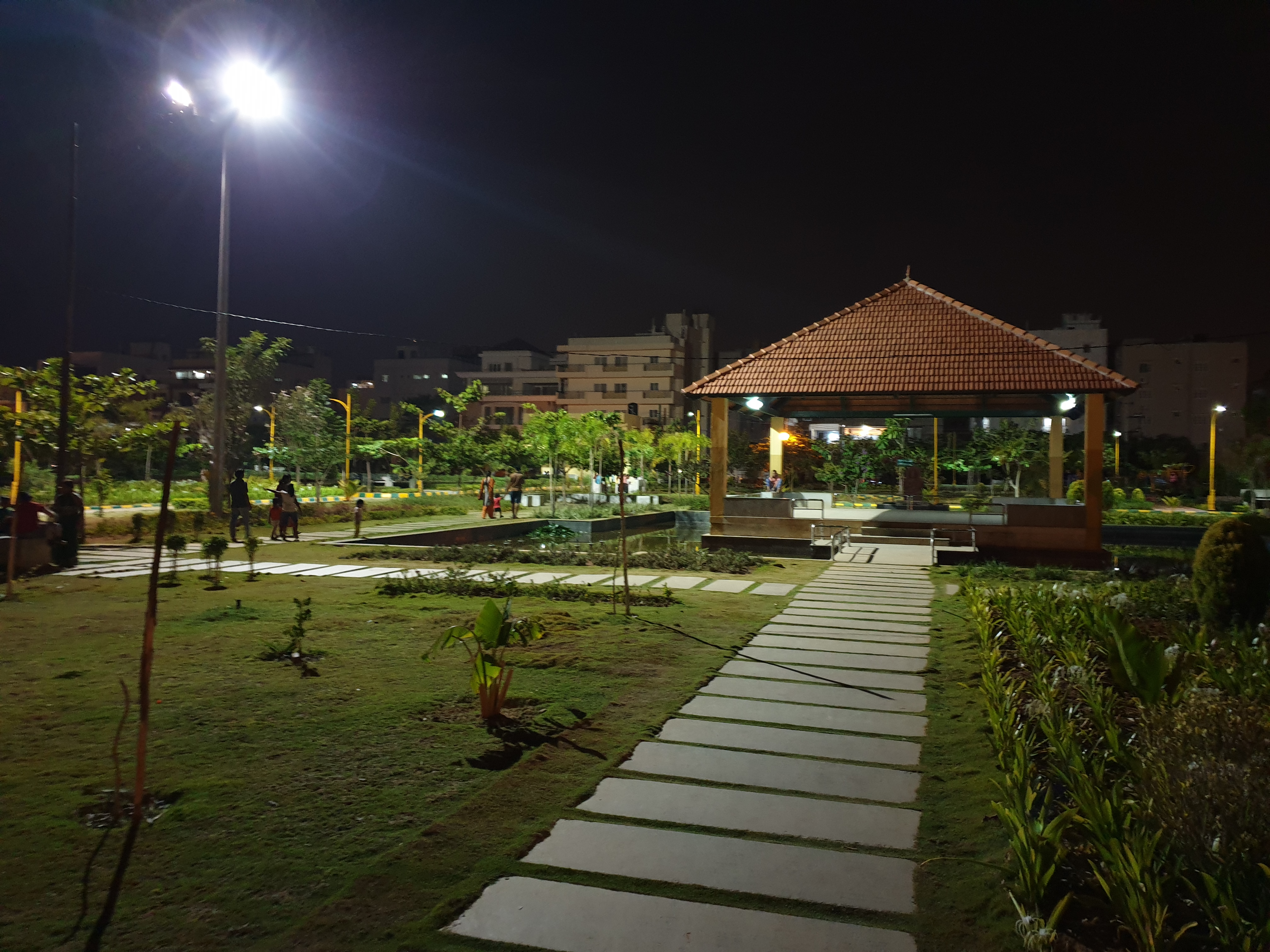
- A park in HSR Layout

- Location in metropolitan Bangalore
- Coordinates: 12.91°N 77.64°E
- Country: India
- State: Karnataka
- Metro: Bangalore
- Named for: Hosur-Sarjapur Road

Population
  - Total: 24,749

Languages
  - Official: Kannada
- Time zone: UTC+5:30 (IST)
- Postal code: 560102
- Vehicle registration: KA-01, KA-51

HSR Layout, an abbreviation of Hosur Sarjapur Road Layout, is an Affluent and high-end suburb in South Eastern Bangalore, India. The locality, initially developed by the Bangalore Development Authority in 1985, has now emerged into a premium commercial and Upscale residential area due to its proximity to Electronic City, Sarjapur Road and the Outer Ring Road on which I.T. Parks and other Special Economic Zones are located. It has wide tree laned roads and hosts numerous parks. HSR Layout is a Start-up hub in Bangalore with major start-ups having head offices there and has highest number of Co-working spaces in Bangalore. It started gaining prominence after the nearby neighbourhood Koramangala became expensive for new-age founders to lease their new offices and HSR layout provided an alternative to them as its close-by and has been a thriving hub since then. It is a hot bed for commercial Real estate with Reddy's owning major properties within the Layout. It lies in the Bommanahalli constituency of the Karnataka State Assembly.

Neighbouring localities of Agara, Parangipalya, Venkatapura, Somsundarapalya, Mangammanapalya and Hosapalya are also part of HSR Layout.

Designed based on modern town planning principles, the layout has a centralized BDA Complex, which houses the city administrative offices and also other commercial establishments.

Other prominent areas like Koramangala, J.P Nagar and BTM Layout are also easily accessible. Parks and modern civic amenities are some of the best maintained in the area.

== Location ==
The area is built on land reclaimed from Agara lake, is located between Hosur Road and Sarjapur Road. HSR Layout is about 7km from Bangalore's other large residential areas of Jayanagar, J.P. Nagar and 2km from Koramangala.

HSR Layout is divided into seven sectors which have main roads and cross roads. Main roads run north–south and Cross roads run east–west.

== Places of Interest ==
=== Agara Lake ===
Agara lake is popular water body in HSR layout for morning walks and various activities.

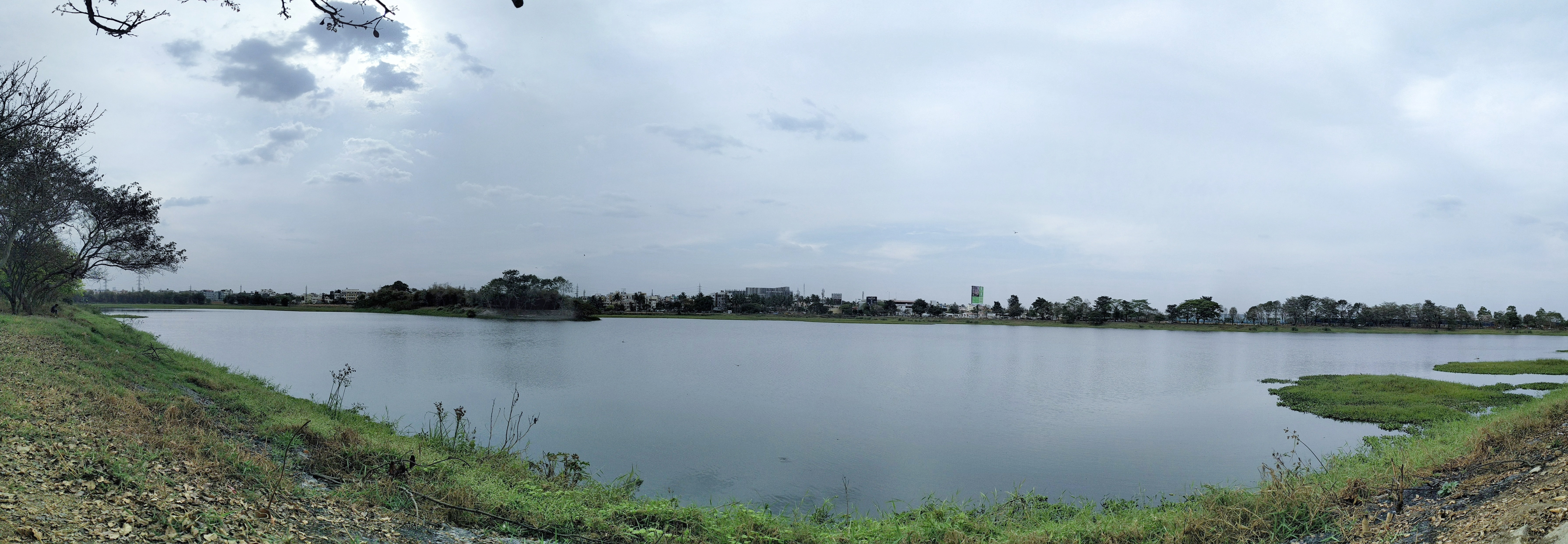

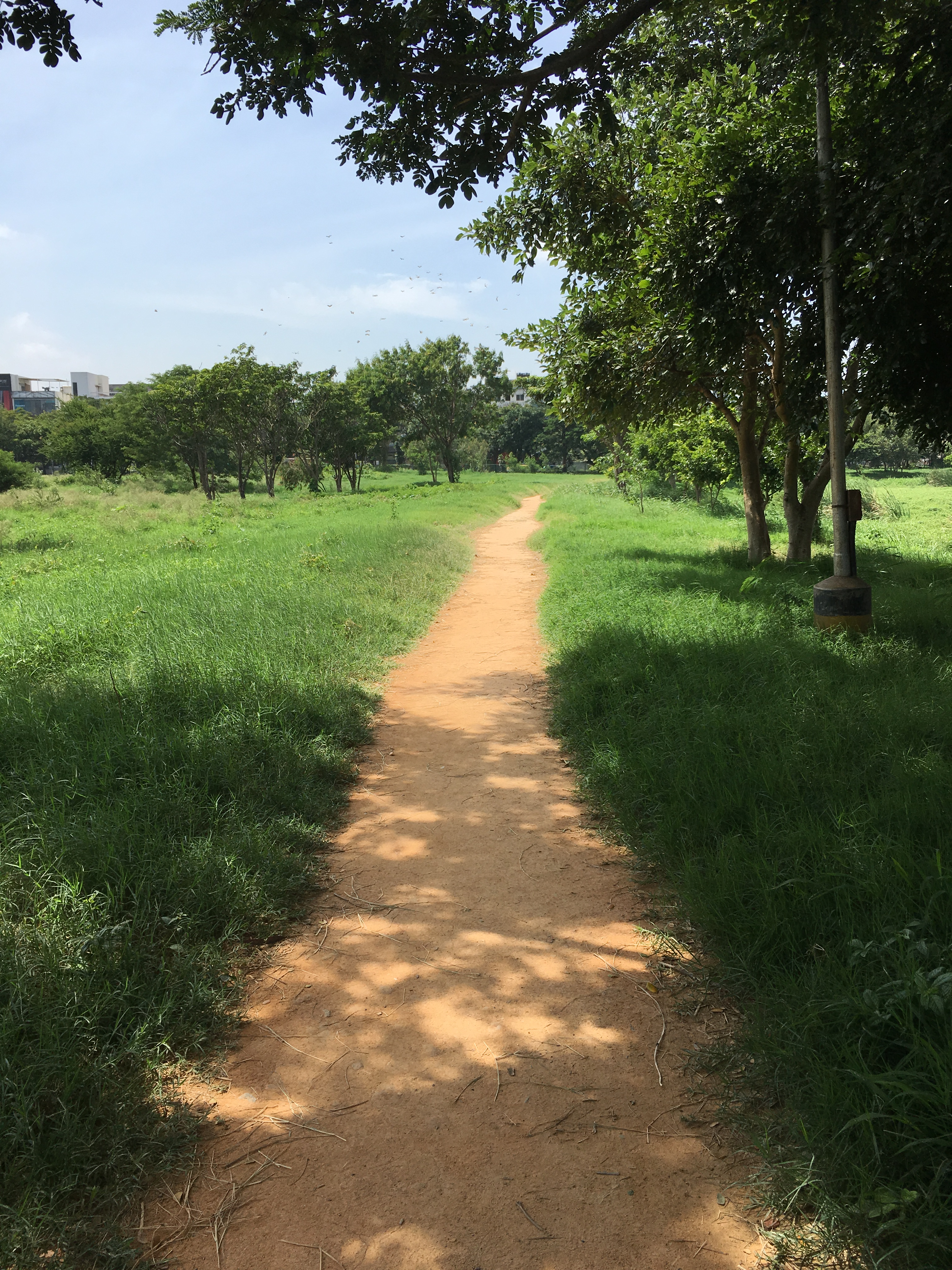

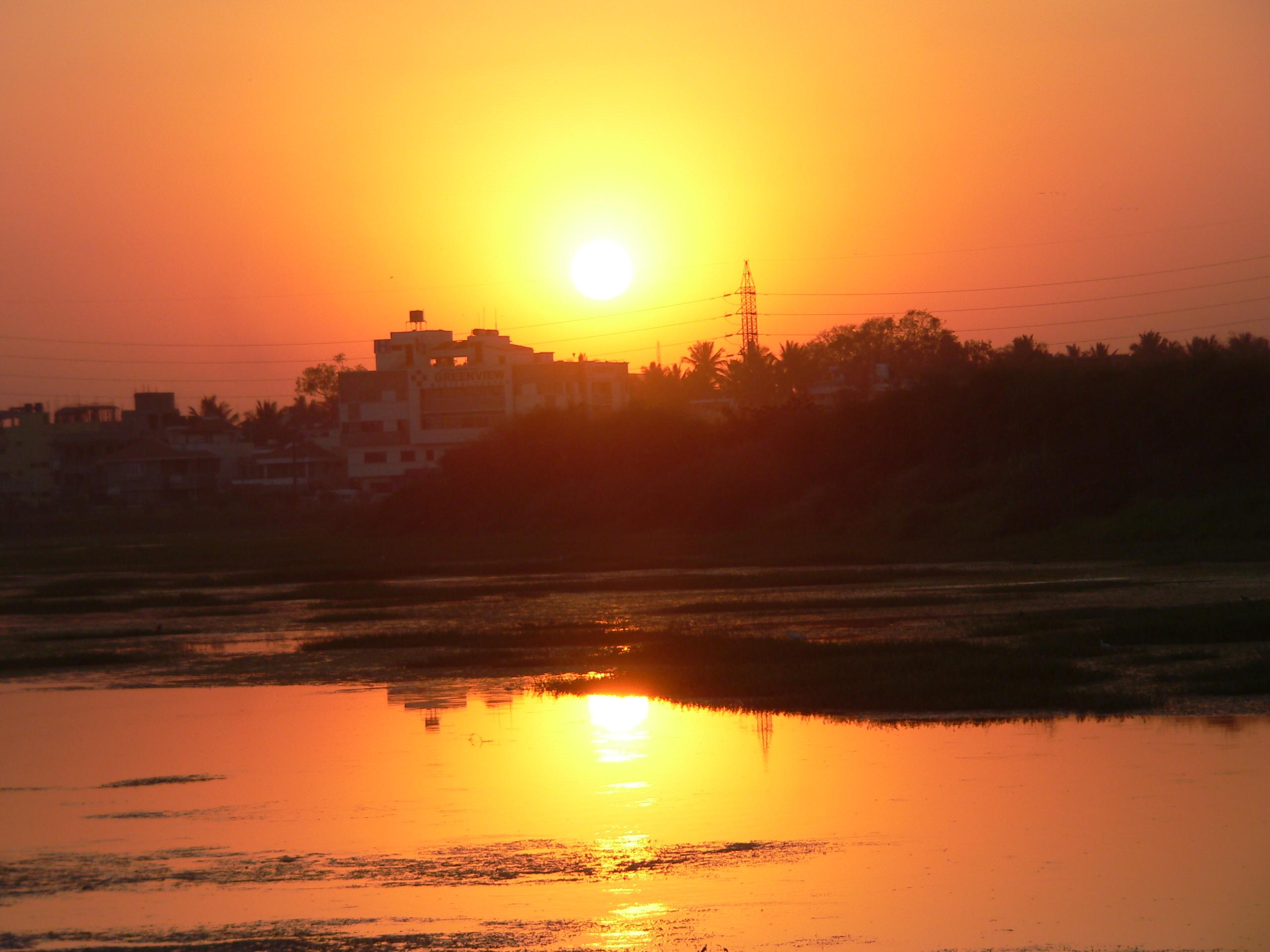

=== Parks ===
HSR Layout is a home to several small and medium-sized parks which are actively maintained by BBMP. Few years ago, burning of dry leaves became a major problem here. By building a network of compost pits and getting BBMP on board, residents have put an end to the hazard of garbage.

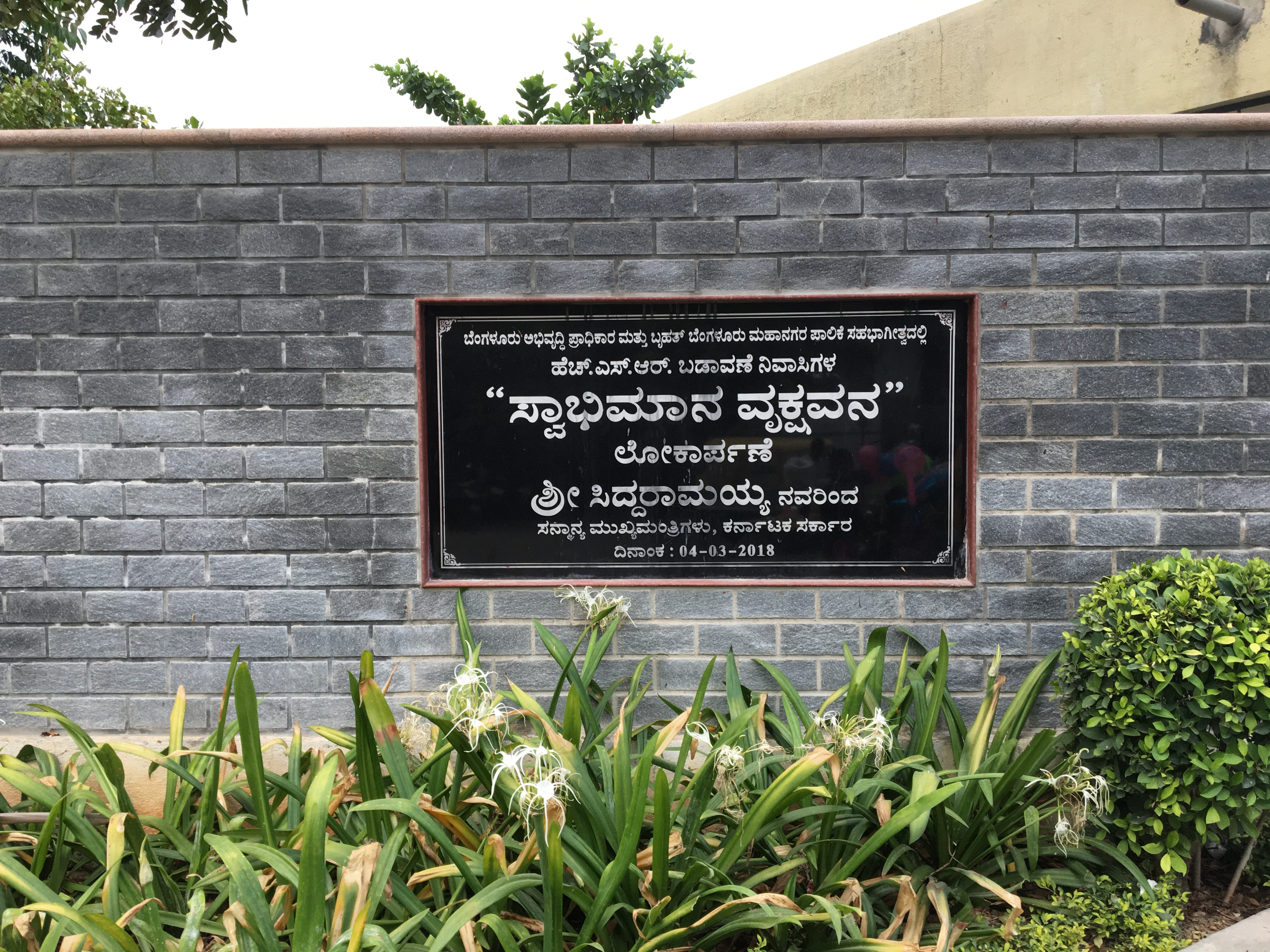

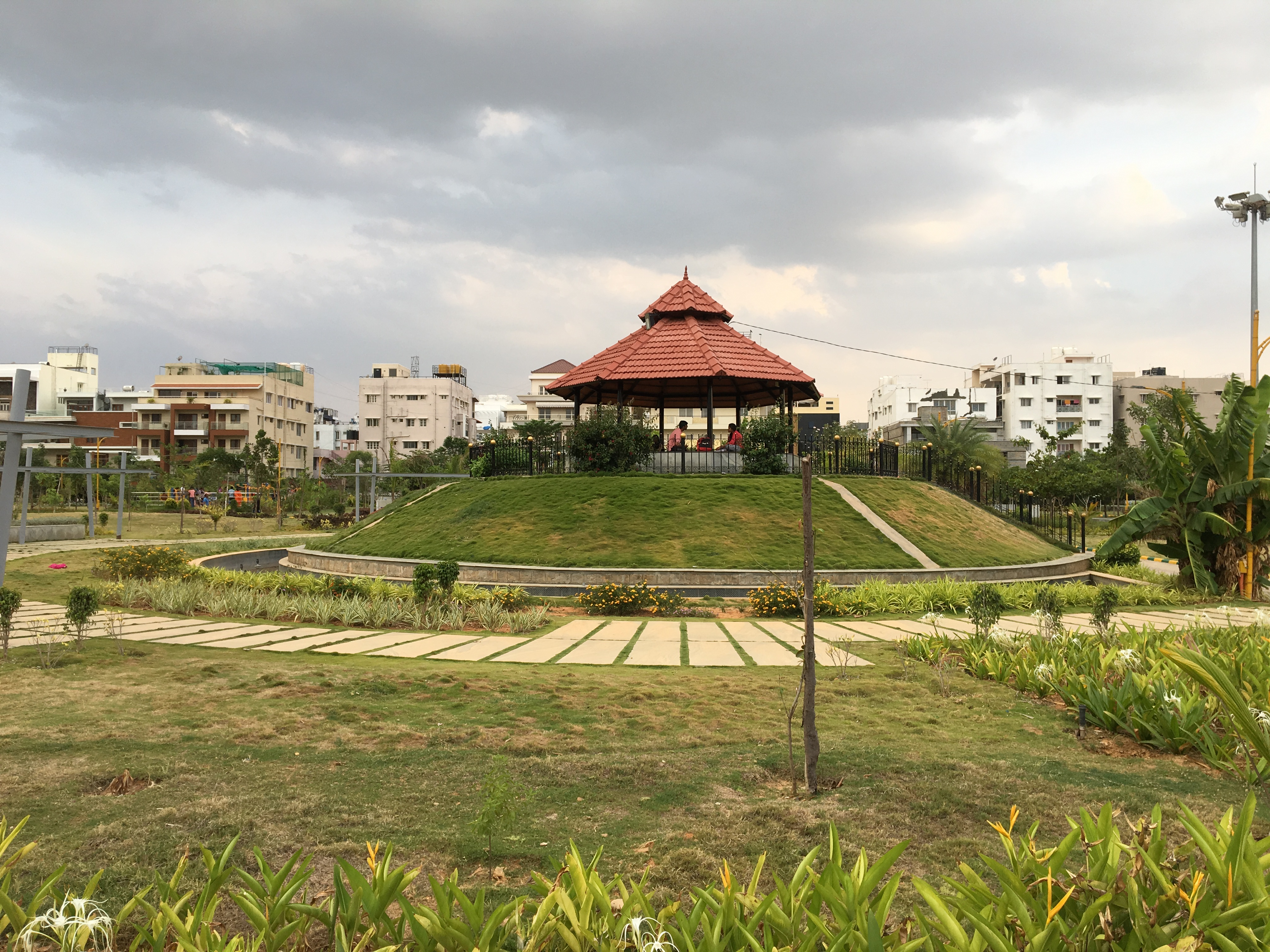

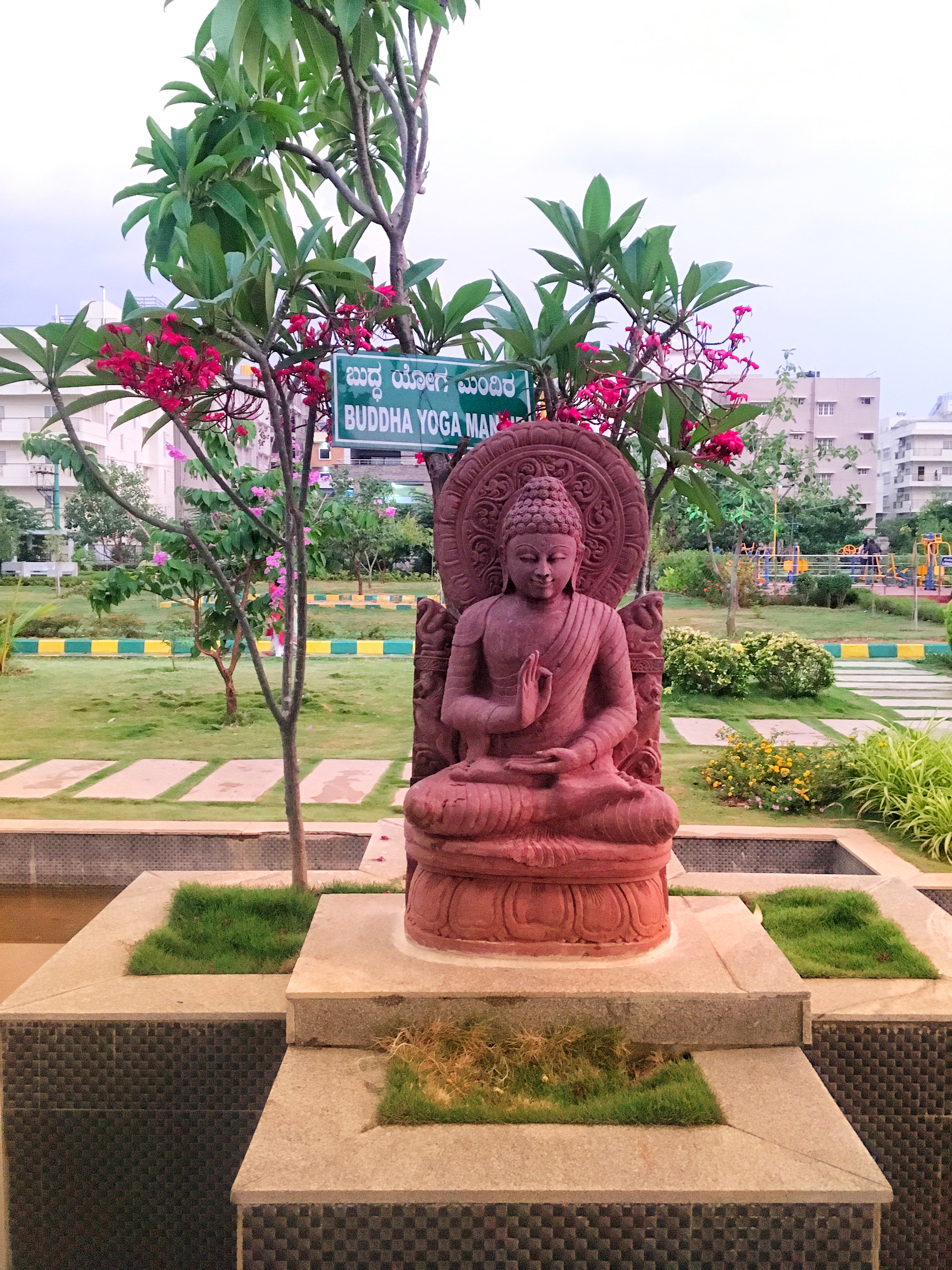

HSR Layout also has one of its kind Composting Learning Center in Sector 4 - at one of its BBMP Parks. This learning center called Swachagraha Kalika Kendra has live models of community and home composting units. Volunteers of HSR Citizen Forum, an NGO working on sustainability initiatives(& main focus on solid waste) greet the visitors and explain to them about waste management. School & college students visit here for their field visit, and officials, apartments and many visitors from all parts of India and abroad have visit this learning center to learn to compost their kitchen waste. The park also has growing area - chemical free and pesticide free. The compost made in the Kedra is used to enrich the soil and grow greens and vegetables. This is the attractive area for the visitors. The Kendra also has 2 cows, and the cow dung is used to provide microbes for composting. So, Kalika Kendra is a completely sustainable learning center. Visitors are also introduced to sustainable waste-management practices, including refusing, reducing, reusing, and recycling dry waste, along with appropriate management of residual waste.

=== Schools ===
A number of schools have opened up to serve HSR Layout's growing population, such as National Public School (kudlu), JSS Public School (established in 2004), Oxford College (founded in 1974) and the National Institute of Fashion Technology (NIFT) along with Networkers Home.

The other educational institutions are: Euro School HSR (Formerly Cambridge Public School), St. Lawrence School, Freedom International School, Mount Litera Zee School, Sri Chaitanya School, Vibgyor School, Narayana School, Sri Sri Ravishankar Vidya Mandir and JSS Public School.

There are also a few Montessori and pre-KG schools like Vivero International Pre-school & Day Care, Floretz Academy, Hive Preschool, KLAY Preschool and Daycare, Golden Arch Montessori.

To serve students preparing for competitive examinations there are institutions like Allen, Aakash, FIIT JEE, Siri Shrine Academy and Rao's Academy.

=== Private Hospitals ===
HSR layout also has a number of Super Specialty Hospitals such as Narayana Multi Specialty Hospital, Green View Medical Center, Primus Hospital, Aspire Fertility Center, Lotus Multi Specialty Hospital, Spandhana Diagnostic Center, Shivakumar Medicals and General Stores, etc.

- Vowels 9M healthcare Private Limited
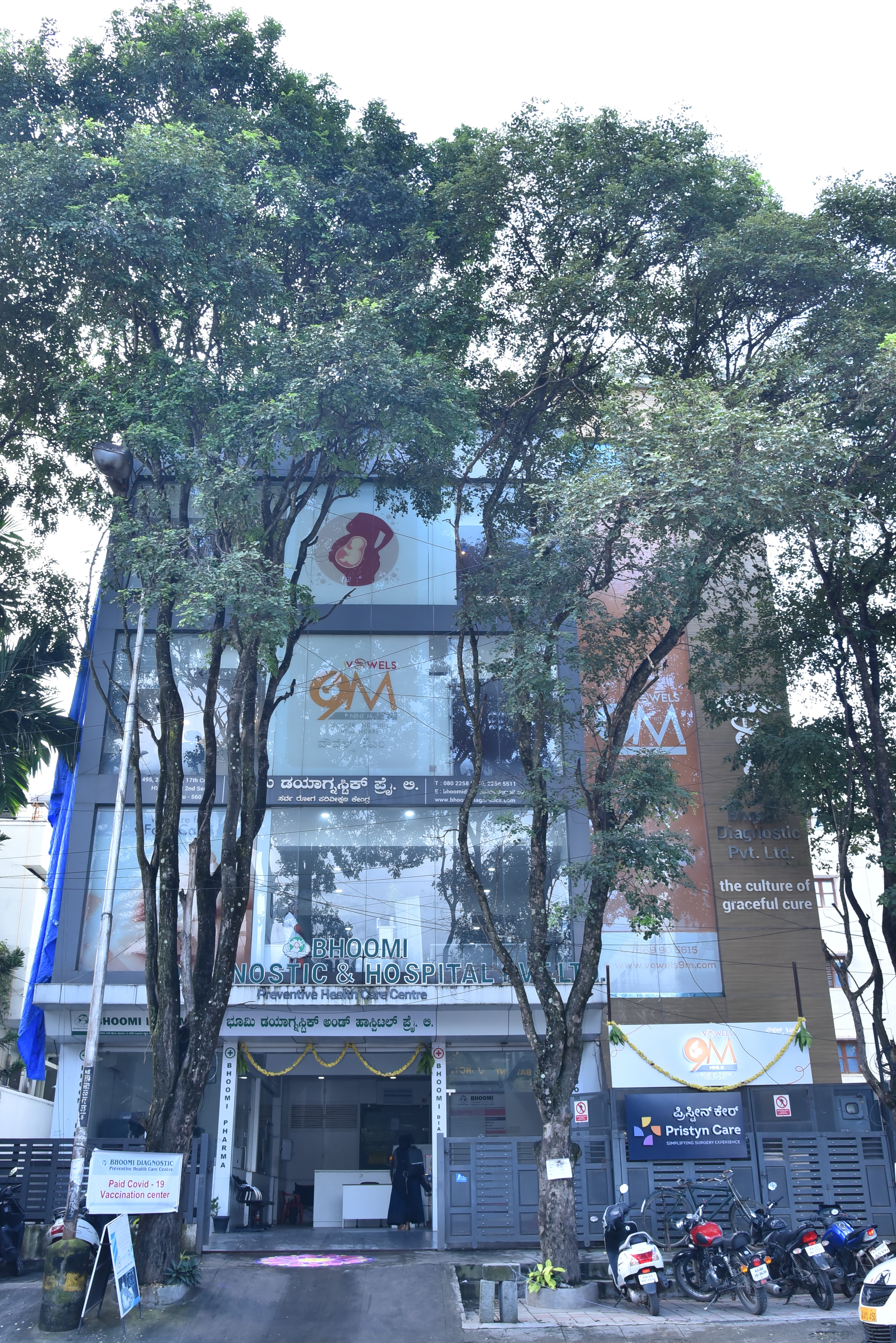
  Vowels 9M Mother and Child care
- Sai Thunga Hospital Agara
- Narayana Multispeciality Hospital
- Greenview Medical Center - Multi Speciality Hospital Bangalore
- Phoenix Hospital

=== Temples ===
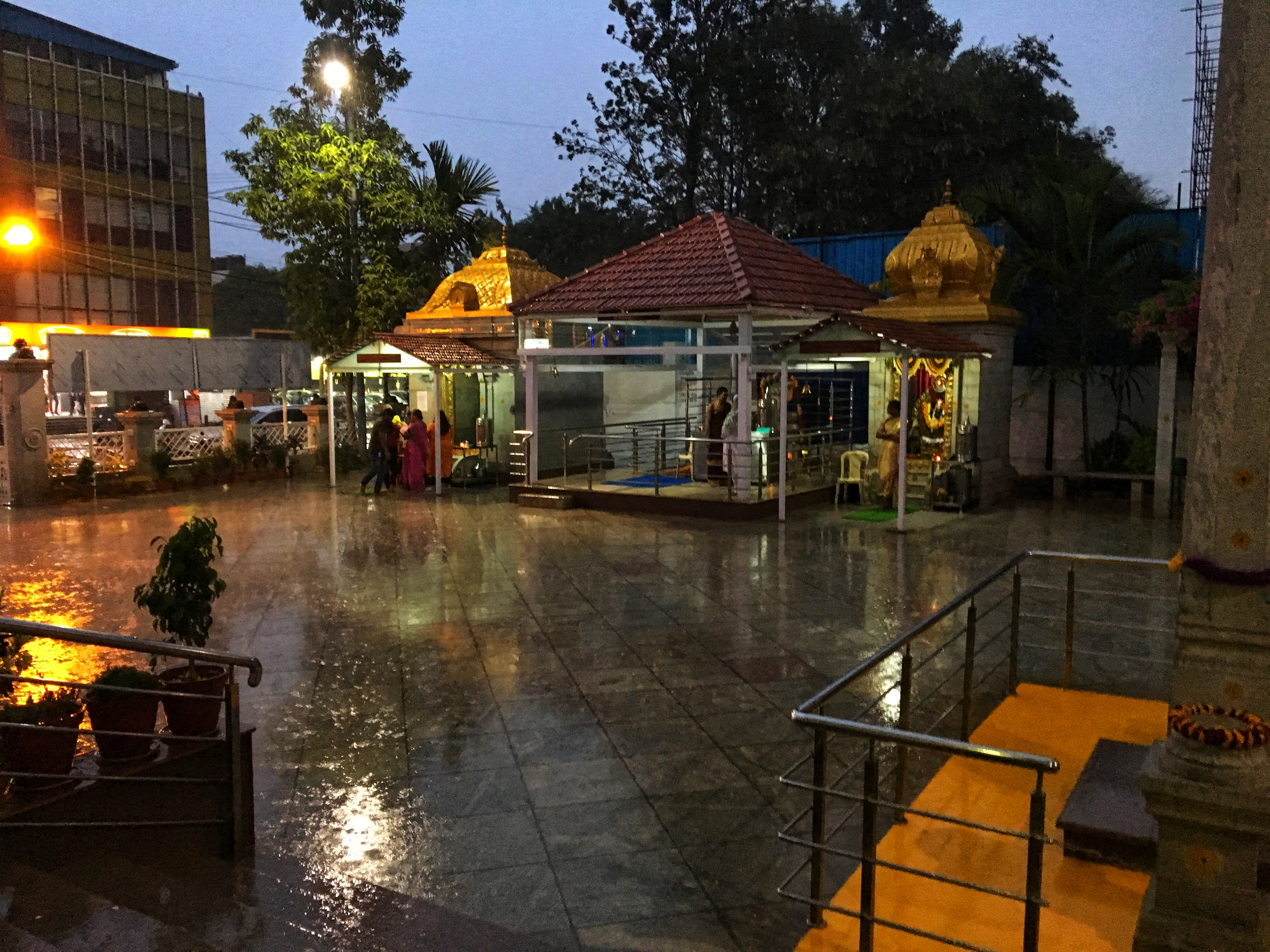
Basaveshwara Gayathri Temple

Basaveshwara Gayathri Temple is located on 24th main road HSR layout.
