= Hebbala metro station =

Upcoming Namma Metro station under Blue Line

Hebbala
- Under Construction of this metro station under Phase 2B of Namma Metro's Blue Line as of Sept 2026

General information
- Location: Vayunandana Layout, Hebbal Kempapura, Bengaluru, Karnataka 560024
- Coordinates: 13.044287°N 77.592666°E
- System: Namma Metro station
- Owner: Bangalore Metro Rail Corporation Ltd (BMRCL)
- Operator: Namma Metro
- Lines: Blue Line - Under Construction; Orange Line - Approved; Red Line - Proposed
- Platforms: Side platform (TBC); Platform-1 → Train Terminates Here * Platform-2 → KIAL Terminals Platform-3 → Kempapura; Platform-4 → JP Nagar 4th Phase; Platform-5 → Train Terminates Here; Platform-6 → Sarjapura; Platform Numbers (TBC) * (Further extension to Krishnarajapura / Central Silk Board in the future)
- Tracks: 06 (TBC)
- Connections: • Hebbala BMTC Terminus •Hebbala Suburban Station

Construction
- Structure type: Elevated, Double track
- Platform levels: (TBC)
- Parking: (TBC)
- Cycle facilities: (TBC)
- Accessible: (TBC)
- Architect: Nagarjuna Constructions Company Ltd. (NCC Ltd).

Other information
- Status: Under Construction - Casting of Platform Level Beams; Approved; Proposed
- Station code: (TBC)

History
- Opening: March 2028; 15 months' time (TBC); 2031; 5 years' time (TBC); 2033; 7 years' time (TBC)
- Electrified: 750 V DC third rail

Services
Preceding station	Namma Metro	Following station
Terminus	Blue Line (Operational around March 2028)	Kodigehalli towards KIAL Terminals
Kempapura towards Krishnarajapura or Central Silk Board	Blue Line (Operational around March 2028)	Kodigehalli towards KIAL Terminals
Future Service
Patelappa Layout towards JP Nagar 4th Phase	Orange Line (Approved)	Kempapura Terminus
Terminus	Red Line (Proposed)	Veterinary College towards Sarjapura
Route map
Location

Hebbala is an upcoming elevated metro station on the north–south corridor of the Blue Line of Namma Metro in Bangalore, India. This is a prime location for its neighbouring areas like Hebbal and Kempapura. This metro station (under Blue Line) is slated to become operational around June 2027. This metro station will have 6 platforms totally, for being an interchange of 3 lines - Blue Line, Orange Line and Red Line.

== History ==
=== Blue Line ===
On November 17, 2020, the Bangalore Metro Rail Corporation Limited (BMRCL) invited bids for the construction of the Hebbala metro station, part of the 11.678 km Reach 2B – Package 2 (Hebbala - Bagalur Cross) of the 37.692 km Blue Line of Namma Metro. On September 14, 2021, Nagarjuna Construction Company Ltd. (NCC Ltd.) was chosen as the lowest bidder for this segment, with their proposal closely matching the initial cost estimates. As a result, the contract was awarded to the company, which led to the beginning of the construction works of this metro station as per the agreed terms.

== Station layout ==
Blue Line Station Layout - To Be Confirmed

G	Street level	Exit/Entrance
L1	Mezzanine	Fare control, station agent, Metro Card vending machines, crossover
L2	Side platform | Doors will open on the left
L2	Platform # Southbound	Towards → Train Terminates Here ** Next Station: Kempapura; Change at the next station for Orange Line
L2	Platform # Northbound	Towards ← KIAL Terminals; Next Station: Kodigehalli
L2	Side platform | Doors will open on the left
L2	Note:	** To be further extended to Krishnarajapura / Central Silk Board in the future

Orange Line Station Layout - To Be Confirmed

G	Street level	Exit/Entrance
L1	Mezzanine	Fare control, station agent, Metro Card vending machines, crossover
L2	Side platform | Doors will open on the left
L2	Platform # Eastbound	Towards → Kempapura; Change at the next station for Blue Line
L2	Platform # Westbound	Towards ← JP Nagar 4th Phase; Next Station: Nagashetty Halli
L2	Side platform | Doors will open on the left
L2

Red Line Station Layout - To Be Confirmed

G	Street level	Exit/Entrance
L1	Mezzanine	Fare control, station agent, Metro Card vending machines, crossover
L2	Side platform | Doors will open on the left
L2	Platform # Northbound	Towards → Train Terminates Here
L2	Platform # Southbound	Towards ← Sarjapura; Next Station: Ganga Nagar
L2	Side platform | Doors will open on the left
L2

== See also ==
- Bangalore
- List of Namma Metro stations
- Transport in Karnataka
- List of metro systems
- List of rapid transit systems in India
- Bangalore Metropolitan Transport Corporation
