= Red Line (Namma Metro) =

Proposed line of Bengaluru's Namma Metro

Overview
- Other names: Third North–South Corridor; Line 8; Hebbala–Sarjapura Line
- Native name: Keṁpu mārga
- Status: Under Construction
- Owner: Bangalore Metro Rail Corporation Limited (BMRCL)
- Locale: Bangalore, Karnataka, India
- Termini: Hebbala; Sarjapura
- Connecting lines: Operational (1): Purple Line; Upcoming (3): Blue Line Orange Line Pink Line; Proposed (1): Inner Ring Line
- Stations: 28
- Website: bmrc.co.in

Service
- Type: Metro
- System: Namma Metro
- Depot: Sarjapur Depot

History
- Planned opening: 2038; 12 years' time (TBC)

Technical
- Line length: 37 km (23 mi)
- Number of tracks: 2
- Character: (TBC)
- Track gauge: 1,435 mm (4 ft 8 1/2 in) standard gauge
- Electrification: 750 V DC third rail

The Red Line or Hebbal-Sarjapura Line is a proposed metro rail line that will become part of Namma Metro's network in the city of Bangalore, Karnataka, India. Phase-3A of Namma Metro has been planned to become operational around 2038.

As per latest news updates, the Karnataka Cabinet had approved the Phase 3A of this metro line, linking Sarjapur in southeastern Bengaluru with Hebbal in the north on December 6, 2024. The approval from the Union Cabinet is awaited, as the Centre holds a 50% equity stake in Namma Metro.

== History ==
=== Proposal ===
The Hebbal–Sarjapur corridor was first identified as the Carmelaram–Yelahanka line in the Comprehensive Mobility Plan (CMP) 2020, and was subsequently considered for inclusion in the Namma Metro Phase 3 Detailed Project Report (DPR). However, when the final Phase 3 DPR was approved by the Karnataka Government in 2022, the corridor was omitted. The decision was met with widespread criticism from residents and commuters along the rapidly developing Sarjapur Road corridor, who argued that the area continued to suffer from severe traffic congestion despite being one of Bengaluru's fastest-growing residential and IT hubs.

In response to growing public demand, the Karnataka Government announced the Hebbal–Sarjapur corridor as a separate Phase 3A project. The proposal envisioned a 37 km metro line connecting Hebbal in north Bengaluru with Sarjapur in the southeast at an estimated cost of ₹15,000 crore. The corridor was planned to serve major localities including Dairy Circle, Koramangala, Agara, Bellandur, and Sarjapur Road. The initial proposal comprised 29 stations, of which 15 were planned to be underground, with approximately 16.8 km of the alignment passing below ground.

=== Initial DPR ===
BMRCL subsequently invited bids for the preparation of the Detailed Project Report, which was submitted to the Karnataka Government in June 2024. The State Cabinet approved the DPR on 6 December 2024, following which it was forwarded to the Government of India for statutory approval. Compared to the original proposal, the DPR omitted the planned Sulikunte and Sudduguntepalya, stations while introducing a new station at Kada Agrahara Road. Several stations were also renamed, and the number of underground stations was reduced from 15 to 11. The finalized alignment measured 36.58 km, with an estimated project cost of ₹28,405 crore, making it the most expensive Namma Metro corridor on a per-kilometre basis.

The Government of India subsequently returned the DPR, citing concerns over the project's high construction cost, which was estimated at ₹776.3 crore per kilometre. In response, the Karnataka Government appointed the French engineering consultancy Systra to revise the project and identify cost-saving measures.

=== Revisions and Tenders ===
A revised DPR was submitted in February 2026, introducing several design modifications. The stations at Veterinary College and Kodati Gate were removed, while a new Sarjapur Terminal station was added. The underground section was shortened by approximately 160 metres, although the overall corridor length increased from 36.58 km to 37.80 km due to alignment refinements. Underground station dimensions were also reduced from 200 × 27 metres to 170 × 21.5 metres, and interchange station layouts were redesigned to further reduce construction costs. These changes lowered the estimated project cost to ₹25,999 crore, after which the revised DPR was resubmitted to the Central Government for approval. As a result of the revisions and approval process, the anticipated opening of the corridor was deferred from 2031 to April 2033.

== Funding ==

Estimated at Rs 16,543 crore, including land acquisition charges, the 37-km line is outlined in the Comprehensive Mobility Plan 2020. This proposed metro line is expected to ease travel for public commuting to and from tech zones. The alignment involves an elevated corridor near the IT corridor in Sarjapur, transitioning underground at Koramangala, traversing the central business district through tunnels, and emerging on Ballari Road with elevated stations at Ganganagar and Hebbal.

== Tendering ==
Red Line
Pre-Construction Activity
Tendering	Section	Activity	Successful Bid /Cost	Contractor	Award
Phase-3A/GTI/P1/2025/138	Sarjapur to Carmelaram	Geo-Technical Investigation	₹1.6 crore (US$170,000)	Becquerel Industries	13 Feb 2026
Phase-3A/GTI/P2/2025/139	Carmelaram to Koramangala 3rd Block	Geo-Technical Investigation	₹1.26 crore (US$130,000)	Becquerel Industries	13 Feb 2026
Phase-3A/GTI/P3/2025/140	Koramangala 3rd Block to KR Circle	Geo-Technical Investigation	₹1.06 crore (US$110,000)	Goma Engineering	13 Feb 2026
Phase-3A/GTI/P4/2025/141	KR Circle to Hebbal	Geo-Technical Investigation	₹1.32 crore (US$140,000)	RITES	13 Feb 2026
Total			₹5.24 crore (US$540,000)		

== Stations ==
The Red Line (Hebbal-Sarjapura Line) is planned to have 28 stations.

=== Interchanges ===
Passenger interchange facilities, connecting to other metro and railway lines, will be provided at the following stations:

- Hebbala (Connects to the Orange Line, which runs between JP Nagar 4th Phase and Kempapura and to the Blue Line, which runs from Central Silk Board to KIAL Terminals)
- Krishna Rajendra circle (Connects to the Sir M. Visveshwaraya station, Central College metro station of the Purple Line, which runs between Whitefield (Kadugodi) to Challaghatta)
- Dairy Circle (Connects to the Pink Line, which runs between Nagawara and Kalena Agrahara)
- Agara (Connects to the Blue Line, which runs from Central Silk Board to KIAL Terminals)
- Ibbaluru (Connects to the Blue Line, which runs from Central Silk Board to KIAL Terminals)

Red Line
#	Station name		Connections	Station layout (TBC)
#	English	Kannada	Connections	Station layout (TBC)
1	Hebbala	ಹೆಬ್ಬಾಳ	Blue Line (Under Construction); Orange Line (Approved)	Elevated
2	Ganganagar	ಗಂಗಾನಗರ		Elevated
3	Mekhri Circle	ಮೇಖ್ರಿ ಸರ್ಕಲ್		Underground
4	Palace Guttahalli	ಗುಟ್ಟಹಳ್ಳಿ ಅರಮನೆ	Bangalore Palace	Underground
5	Bengaluru Golf Course	ಬೆಂಗಳೂರು ಗಾಲ್ಫ್ ಕೋರ್ಸ್		Underground
6	Basaveshwara Circle	ಬಸವೇಶ್ವರ ವೃತ್ತ		Underground
7	KR Circle	ಕೆ.ಆರ್. ವೃತ್ತ	Purple Line (Sir M. Visveshwaraya station, Central College)	Underground
8	Town Hall	ಟೌನ್ ಹಾಲ್		Underground
9	Shanthinagara	ಶಾಂತಿನಗರ	Shanthinagar Bus TTMC	Underground
10	NIMHANS	ನಿಮ್ಹಾನ್ಸ್		Underground
11	Dairy Circle	ಡೈರಿ ಸರ್ಕಲ್	Pink Line (Under Construction)	Underground
12	Koramangala II Block	ಕೋರಮಂಗಲ II ಬ್ಲಾಕ್		Underground
13	Koramangala III Block	ಕೋರಮಂಗಲ III ಬ್ಲಾಕ್		Elevated
14	Jakkasandra	ಜಕ್ಕಸಂದ್ರ		Elevated
15	Agara	ಅಗರ	Blue Line (Under Construction)	Elevated
16	Ibbaluru	ಇಬ್ಬಲೂರು	Blue Line (Under Construction)	Elevated
17	Bellanduru Gate	ಬೆಳ್ಳಂದೂರು ಗೇಟ್		Elevated
18	Kaikondrahalli	ಕೈಕೊಂಡ್ರಹಳ್ಳಿ		Elevated
19	Doddakannelli	ದೊಡ್ಡಕನ್ನೆಲ್ಲಿ		Elevated
20	Carmelaram	ಕಾರ್ಮೆಲರಾಮ್	Carmelaram Railway Station	Elevated
21	Ambedkar Nagara	ಅಂಬೇಡ್ಕರ್ ನಗರ		Elevated
22	Muthanalluru Cross	ಮುತ್ತನಲ್ಲೂರು ಕ್ರಾಸ್		Elevated
23	Dommasandra	ದೊಮ್ಮಸಂದ್ರ		Elevated
24	Sompura	ಸೋಂಪುರ		Elevated
25	Kada Agrahara Road	ಕಡ ಅಗ್ರಹಾರ ರಸ್ತೆ		Elevated
26	Sarjapura	ಸರ್ಜಾಪುರ		Elevated
27	Sarjapura Terminal Station	ಸರ್ಜಾಪುರ ಟರ್ಮಿನಲ್ ನಿಲ್ದಾಣ		Elevated

== See also ==
- Namma Metro
  - Purple Line
  - Green Line
  - Yellow Line
  - Pink Line
  - Blue Line
  - Orange Line
  - Grey Line
  - Inner Ring Line
  - List of Namma Metro Stations
- Rapid transit in India
- List of metro systems
