= Atal Bihari Vajpayee TTMC =

Bus station in Bangalore, India

Coordinates: 12°57′15.37″N 77°35′32.65″E

Atal Bihari Vajpayee Traffic and Transit Management Center Aṭal Bihāri Vājapēyi San̄cāra Mattu Sārige Nirvahaṇā Kēndra
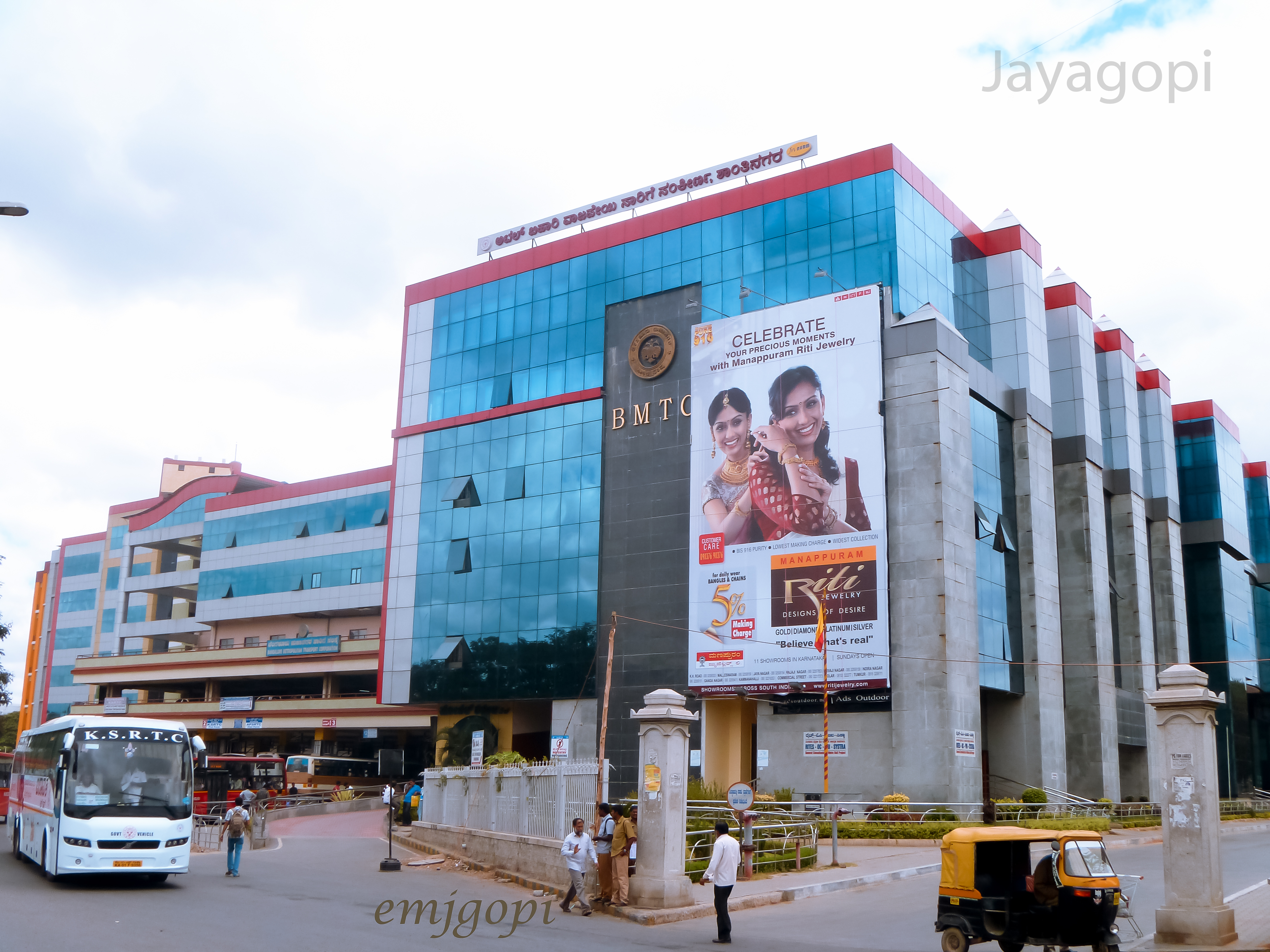
- Airavat Club Class passing next to Shanthi Nagar Bus Station

General information
- Other names: Shantinagara Traffic and Transit Management Center; Shantinagara TTMC; Shantinagara Bus Station
- Location: Shantinagara, Wilson Garden, Bangalore; Karnataka; India
- System: BMTC, KSRTC, Kerala KSRTC ,SETC, APSRTC and PRTC Bus Station
- Owner: Bangalore Metropolitan Transport Corporation
- Operator: Bangalore Metropolitan Transport Corporation
- Transit authority: BMTC
- Bus routes: Bengaluru Metropolitan Region; Tamil Nadu; Andhra Pradesh; Puducherry
- Bus operators: Bangalore Metropolitan Transport Corporation; Karnataka State Road Transport Corporation; Kerala State Road Transport Corporation; State Express Transport Corporation (Tamil Nadu); Andhra Pradesh State Road Transport Corporation; Puducherry Road Transport Corporation
- Connections: BMTC; Shantinagara TTMC

Construction
- Structure type: At-grade
- Parking: Available
- Accessible: Yes

History
- Opened: 2010
Location

The Atal Bihari Vajpayee Traffic and Transit Management Center, also Shantinagara Traffic and Transit Management Center, is a satellite bus station in Shantinagara, Bangalore, Karnataka, India. Long-distance luxury express buses of KSRTC, APSRTC, SETC and PRTC serves from this bus station. Buses to Kerala, Tamil Nadu, Andhra Pradesh and Puducherry depart from this bus station. It is also a transit bus station for BMTC buses.

It was inaugurated on 23 September 2010 by then chief minister, B.S. Yeddyurappa. It was built at a cost of 108.5 crores with construction started in July 2008.. It has The total built up area is 57,582 square metre. Passenger amenities include four waiting lounges, passenger enquiry and pass distribution counters, an internet café, and retiring rooms. There are two office complexes and multi-level car park adjacent to the bus station. Multi level car park up is the largest of its kind to be built by a government corporation. It has space for parking 560 cars and 1,200 motorcycles over 6 floors.

== Location ==
The bus station is located on Kengal Hanumantaiah Road, in Wilson Garden next to the central offices of the Bangalore Metropolitan Transport Corporation and Karnataka State Road Transport Corporation. The Depot #1 of BMTC was remodelled as a bus station with four bays.

== Layout ==
The first bay is for all KSRTC,SETC buses bound for south. The second and third bays are used by BMTC for buses going towards Jayanagar, Koramangala, J.P.Nagar, Bannerghatta Road and Hosur Road. The fourth bay is for all buses going towards Shivajinagar, Kempegowda Bus Station, K.R. Puram(G-12) and Kengeri(G-6). There is also an air-conditioned lounge for passengers waiting for a bus to the Bengaluru International Airport at bay 4.

== Connectivity ==
This place is well connected to Majestic, Shivajinagar, Koramangala, Hosur Road, Sarjapura Road, Bannerghatta Road, Jayanagara, Banashankari, Carmelaram Railway station and Mysuru Road.

== Finances ==
BMTC took a loan of Rs 160 crore from Canara Bank between October 2019 and February 2021 against mortgage of Shantinagar Traffic and Transit Management Centre to raise to pay off the debt used to build it.

== See also ==
- Banashankari TTMC
