= Hanumanthanagar, Bengaluru =

Hanumanthanagara
- suburb
- Location within Bengaluru
- Coordinates: 12.943486°N 77.56239°E
- Country: India
- State: Karnataka
- District: Bengaluru Urban
- Metro: Bengaluru
- Zone: Bengaluru South
- Ward: 155

Languages
  - Official: Kannada
- Time zone: UTC+5:30 (IST)
- PIN: 560019,560050
- Telephone code: 91-80
- Vehicle registration: KA 05
- Lok Sabha constituency: Bangalore South
- Vidhan Sabha constituency: Basavanagudi

Hanumanthanagara, is a locality in the Banashankari suburb of South Bangalore. It gets its name from the Ramanjaneya Temple near the Kengal Hanumanthaiah Kalaa Soudha, which was built during the time of Kengal Hanumanthaiah, the then chief minister of Karnataka.

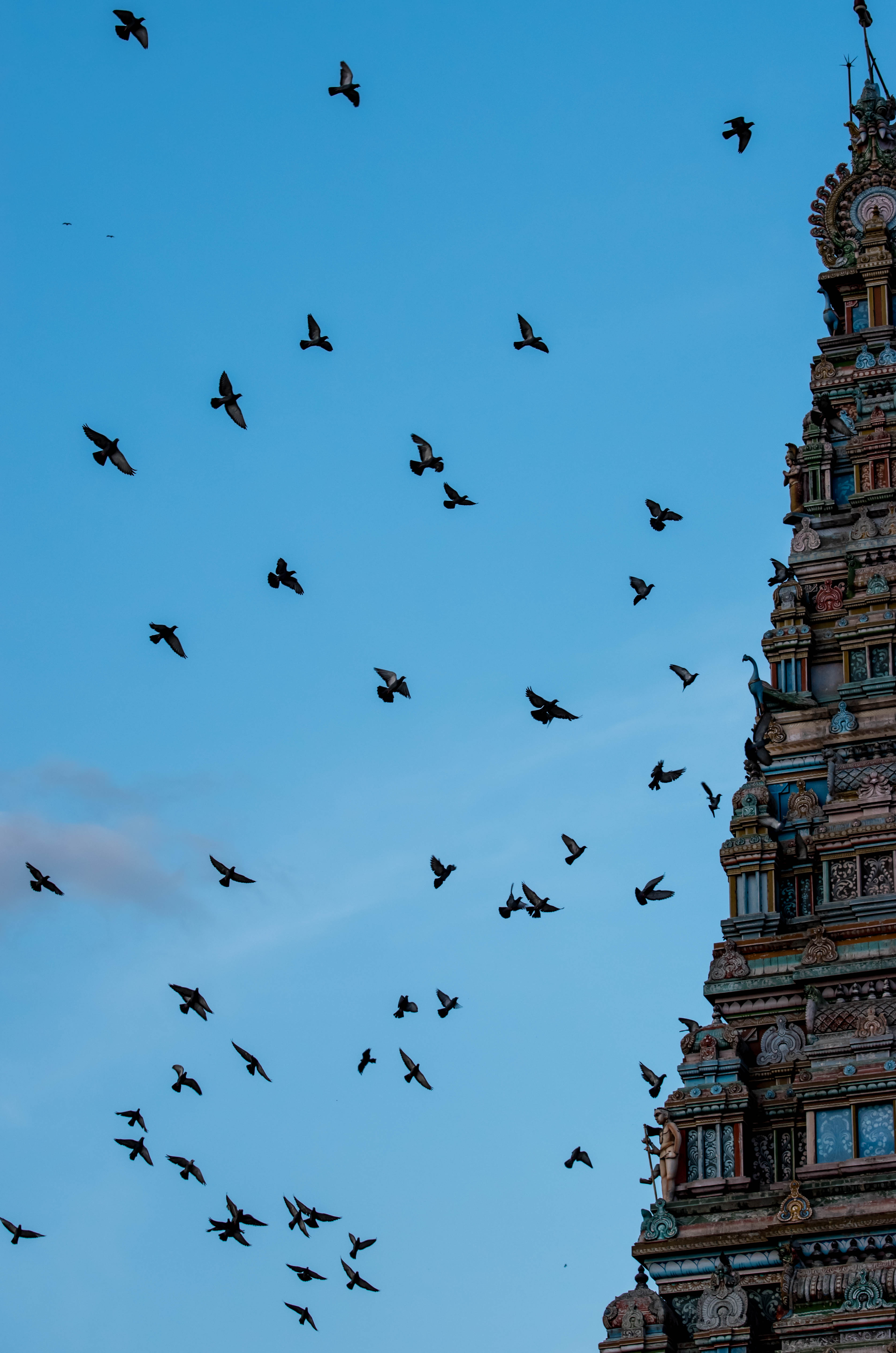
Birds flying at Kumara Swamy Temple in Hanumantha Nagara

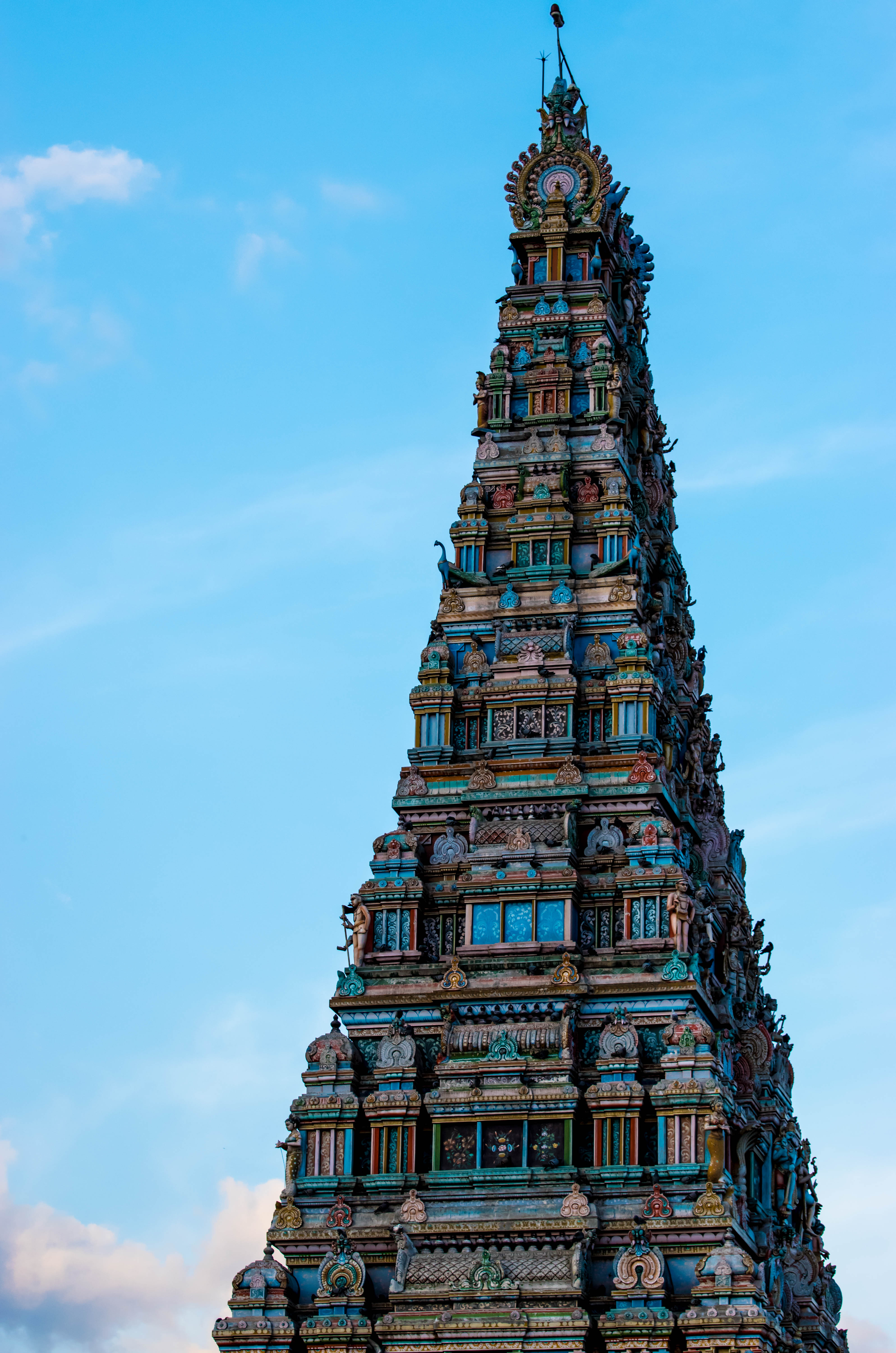
Long Standing Gopuram at Kumara Swamy temple

This area is one of the oldest areas of Bangalore with large Brahmin population. Byatarayanapura, Srinagar, Nagendra Block, Kalidasa Layout, Raghavendra Block, Brindavan Nagar, Srinivasa Nagar, Vidhyapeetha, Mysore Bank Colony, Hosakerehalli, Girinagar and Ashok Nagar are the surrounding neighbourhoods.

Hanumanthanagar is well-known for the Ramanjaneya Temple, Kumara Swamy Devasthana and K H Kalasoudha. The Head Office of the Hanumanthanagar Cooperative Bank (which has many branches in Bangalore) is also located here.

== Temples in Hanumanthanagar ==
=== Ramanjaneya Gudda Temple ===
This Temple is located atop Ramanjaneya Gudda (Ramanjaneya Hill) adjacent to the Kengal Hanumanthaiah Kalaa Soudha and the Hanumanthanagar Park.

=== Kumaraswaamy Temple ===
This temple to Lord Kumaraswaamy is located on the top of a hill, with stairs going all the way up, known as Mount Joy. Special prayers are performed during "Subbaraaya (Subramannya) Shasti". Adjoining Lord Kumaraswamy are a sacred Shiva Linga, Lord Ganesha in a seated posture and Goddess Parvathi. Also have been consecrated the Navagrahas, in a separate shrine, within the same hall, adjoining the sanctum sanctorum. The Gopuram at the entrance precedes a huge hall and the sanctum sanctorum has a sculpted idol in the Lord's image of his role as a Guru to Lord Shiva himself. This is identical to Swamimalai (Swamimalai is one of the six pilgrimage centers or Aru Padai Kshetram dedicated to Lord Subramanya and it is at Swamimalai that the Lord Kumaraswamy became the Guru to His own father, the Lord Shiva himself), in Thanjavur, Tamil Nadu. In the past, the sanctum sanctorum had a panchaloha (made of five metals) idol. The granite idol seen and worshipped now is of much later origin. The original panchaloha idol is now seen enshrined separately in the hall preceding the main hall - having the sanctum sanctorum.

=== Panchamukhi Ganesha temple ===
At the foot of the hill is the Panchamukhi Ganesha temple. This temple has an idol of Lord Ganesha with five heads, hence the name Panchamukhi Ganesha. His vahana here is different from the usual Mooshika Vahana. Here, His vahana is a Simha (lion). The dominance of the negative, false EGO, that corrupts the mind, is depicted by the lion. Lord Ganesha, in this Panchamukhi form of His, is worshipped to win over the EGO. Since no trick, courage or bravery, whatsoever, of such a mind and the associated negative and false EGO, that corrupts the mind, succeeds in its war against Lord Ganesha, this form of His (also synonymous with the name Vakratunda Mahaganapathi), is worshipped for victory and a calm, balanced & composed state of body, mind and soul. He enables existence in a perfect rhythm, in entirety, with the laws of nature
