= Banashankari =

- neighborhood
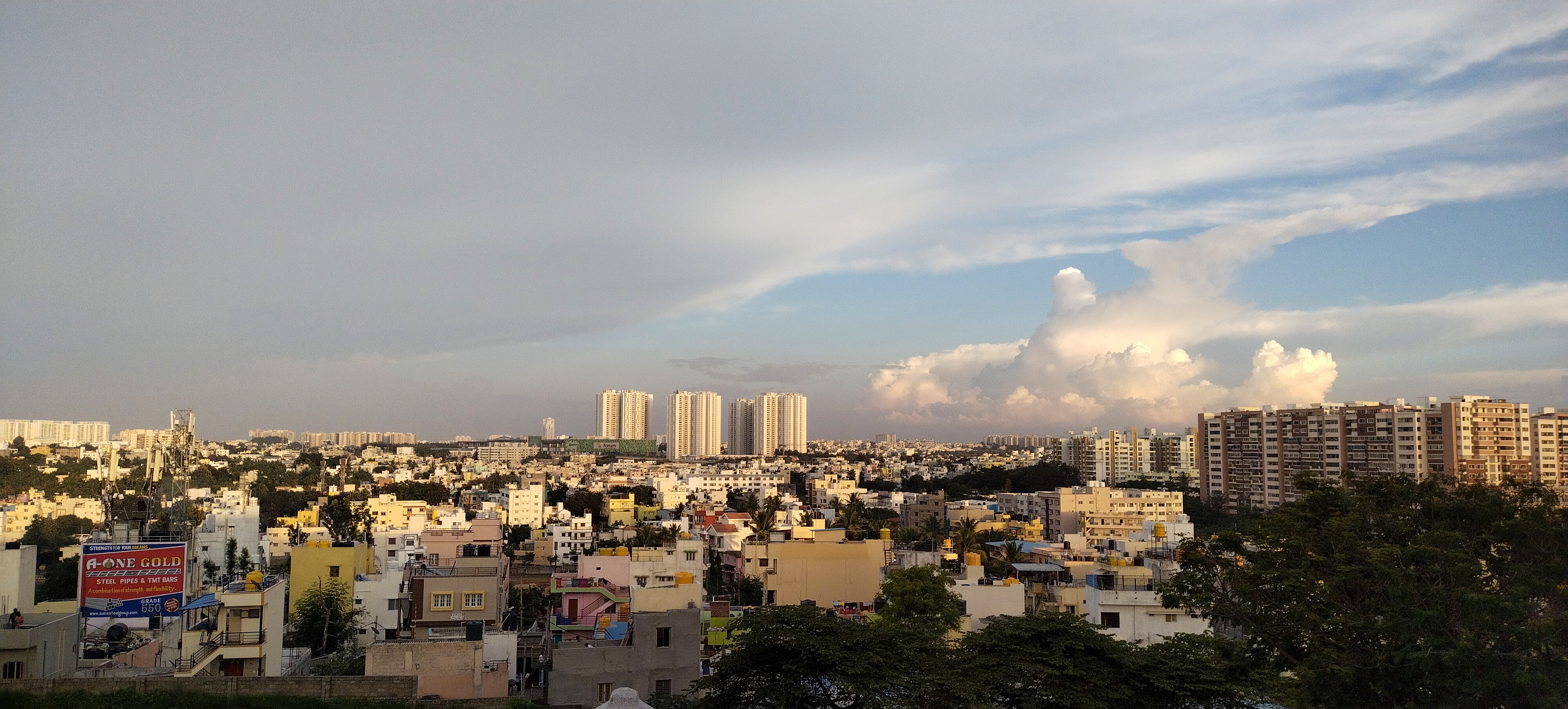
- South Bengaluru skyline as viewed from ISKCON, Vasanthapura.

- Location within Bengaluru
- Coordinates: 12.9373°N 77.5543°E
- Country: India
- State: Karnataka
- District: Bengaluru Urban
- Metro: Bengaluru
- Zone: Bengaluru South and Bengaluru West
- Ward: 155 156, 158, 161, 163, 164, 165, 166, 180, 181, 197, 198
- Named for: Banashankari Amma Temple

Languages
  - Official: Kannada
- Time zone: UTC+5:30 (IST)
- PIN: 560026,560050,560060, 560061,560062,560070, 560078,560085,560098
- Telephone code: 91-80
- Vehicle registration: KA 05, KA 41, KA 58
- Lok Sabha constituency: Bangalore South
- Vidhan Sabha constituency: Spread over Basavanagudi, Padmanabhanagara, Bangalore South, and Vijayanagara

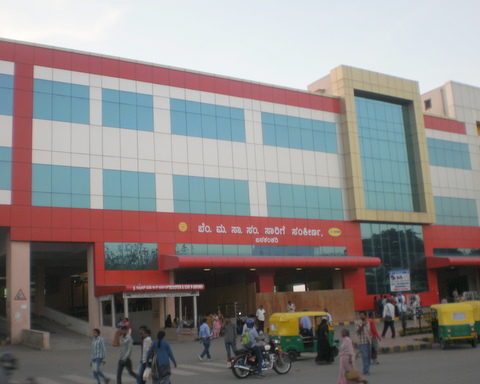
Banashankari TTMC

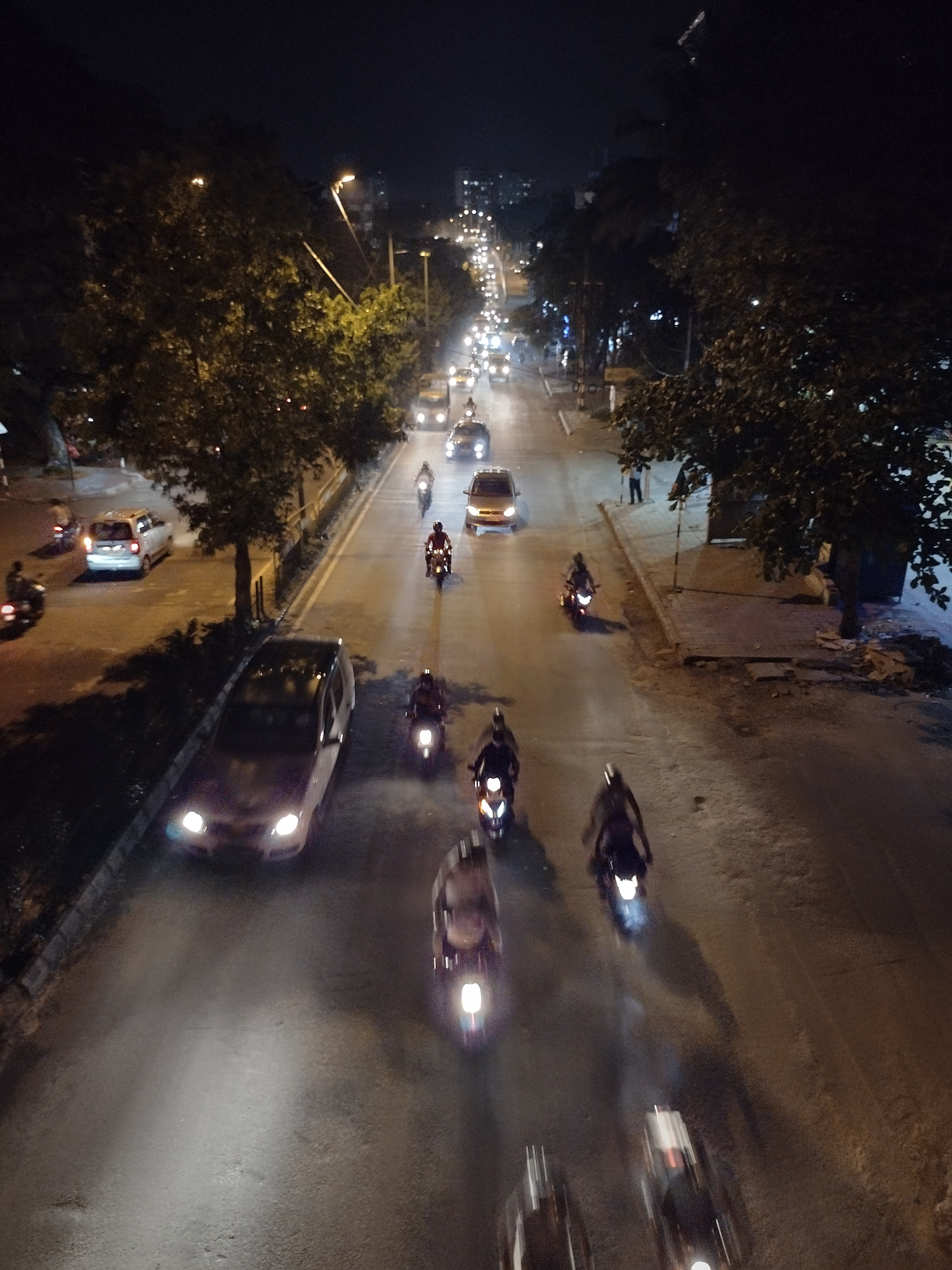
Outer Ring Road in Hosakerehalli.

Banashankari is a locality spread across South and West Bangalore. Its name is derived from the Banashankari Amma Temple on Kanakapura Road, one of Bangalore's renowned temples constructed by Subramanya Shetty in 1915.

The Goddess receives about 350 sarees a week, as of 2012, from the devotees which are auctioned every Friday and the income is used for temple development.

It consists of 6 stages, 1st, 2nd and 3rd stages within the outer ring road and the remaining 4th, 5th and 6th Stages spread over Southwest Bengaluru. A commercial complex was planned in the sixth stage.

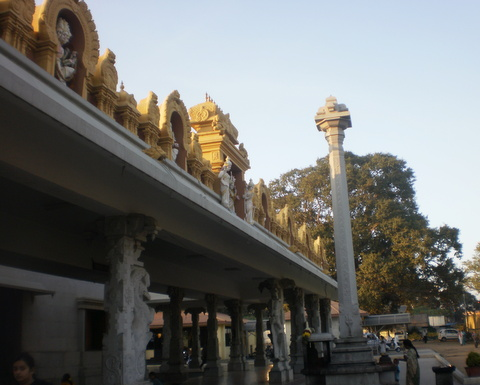
Banashankari temple (2013)

Banashankari is the largest locality in Bangalore, stretching from Mysore Road to Kanakapura Road. It is bordered by Byatarayanapura, Nayandahalli, Girinagar, and Rajarajeshwari Nagar in the west; Basavangudi and Hanumanthanagar in the north; Jayanagar and J.P. Nagar in the east, and Uttarahalli and Kengeri in the south, encompassing parts of these neighborhoods.

== Transport ==
The area boasts excellent connectivity through the Bangalore Metropolitan Transport Corporation. Additionally, it features a Volvo bus facility. There's a reconstructed bus stand and a Traffic Transit Management Centre. Moreover, the Banashankari Metro Station of the Green Line of Namma Metro traverses this locality.

The Banashankari metro station opened in June 2017. It is located about 200 metres from the Banashankari Traffic and Transit Management Centre (TTMC).
