= Vajra Vistara =

Public bus service in India

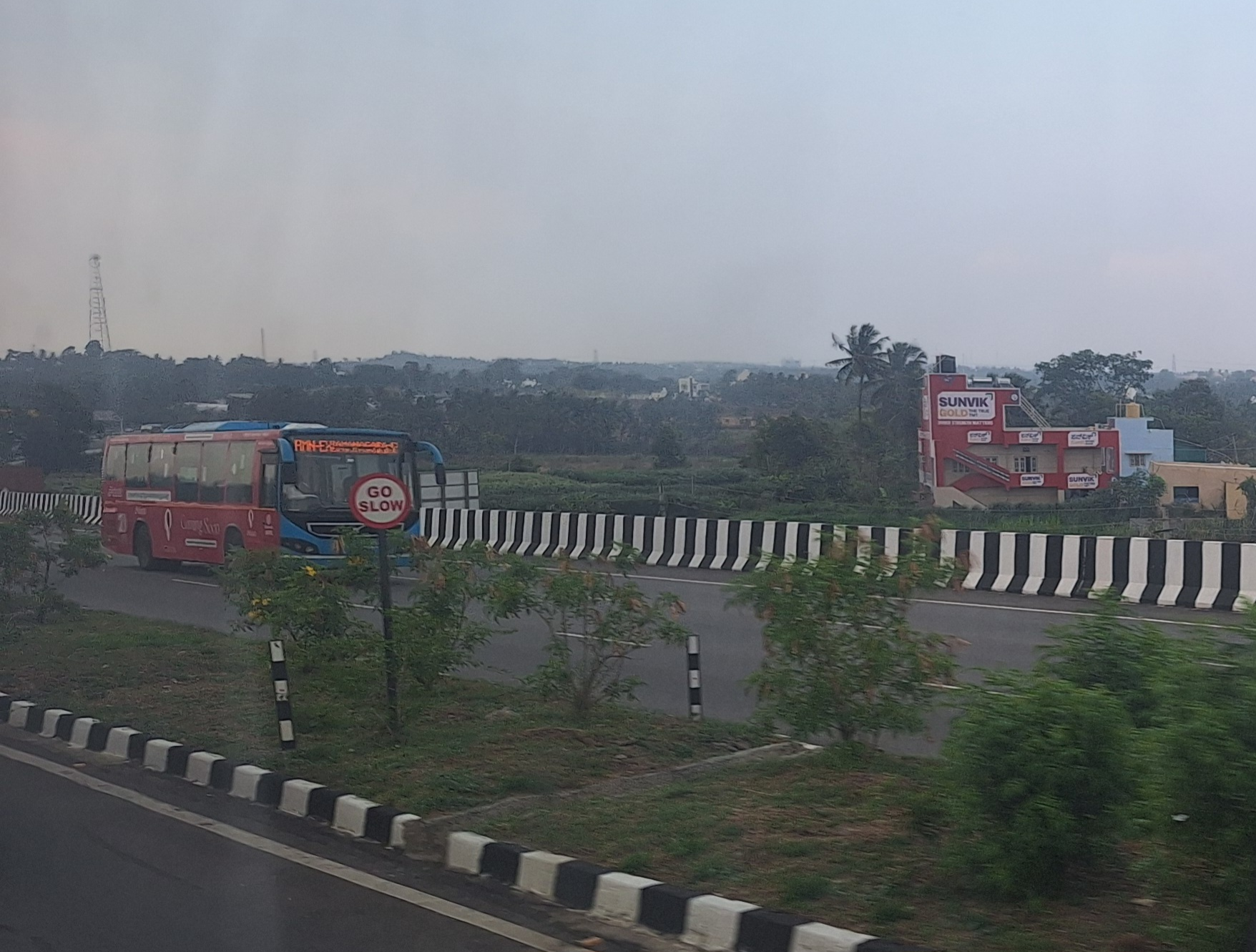
- Ac Vajra Vistara bus(On Vajra Bus,BMTC Livery) in Ramanagara.
- Parent: Bengaluru Metropolitan Transport Corporation
- Founded: 4th March 2026
- Locale: Bengaluru
- Service area: Bengaluru Urban district,Chikkaballapura district,Ramanagara district,Bengaluru Rural district and Tumakuru district
- Service type: AC Seater Intercity connecting with major nearby bangalore satellite towns,cities
- Fleet: Uses fleet of Vajra Electric and Diesel bus
- Fuel type: Diesel,electric bus
- Operator: Bengaluru Metropolitan Transport Corporation (under Government of Karnataka)
- Website: mybmtc.karnataka.gov.in/en

The Vajra Vistara (with suffix EXP) is a series of AC intercity Bus service on Volvo 8400LE,Switch electric bus with a light blue livery operated by BMTC from Bengaluru city to various cities and satellite towns of Greater Bangalore roughly more than 40 kms.

== History ==
After BMTC coverage extending more than 40 kms from city centre,Buses was launced from Kempegowda Bus Station and Banashankari bus ttmc on 4th March 2026 to Ramanagara(later extended to Channapatna) and Kanakpura respectively by then Transport minister of Karnataka Ramalinga Reddy.

== Description ==
These buses are meant to improve connectivity to surburban cities and towns from Bangalore city.These buses are similar to Vegadootha express which is express and limited bus stop service but these buses are AC and go to other towns and cities which The non ac express bus cannot go.These facilitate with Non-AC express bus service operated by KSRTC on same route.Longest route from Electronic City to Tumakuru was launced in 12th July,2026 which covers distance of 101 km.

== Routes ==
=== Kempegowda Bus Station Routes ===
Sl.No	Route Number	Origin	Terminus	Via	Distance(in kms)
1	V-TMK-1EX	Kempegowda Bus Station	Tumakuru bus stand	Navrang, Govardhan Talkies, Goraguntepalya, Widia Factory, Nelamangala Toll, Kyathsandra Bus Stand	60-70
2	V-298MN-EX	Kempegowda Bus Station	Chikkaballapura bus stand	Hebbal,Yelahanka,Devanahalli	60
3	V-EXP-CPT-1	Kempegowda Bus Station	Channapatna	Mysuru Satellite Bus Stand,Kengeri bus terminal,Ramanagara bus stand	60
4	V-EXP-KGL-1	Kempegowda Bus Station	Kunigal	Navrang, Govardhan Talkies, Goraguntepalya, Widia Factory, Nelamangala Toll,Soluru,Maluru HP	73

=== Banashankari Bus Routes ===
Sl.No	Route Number	Destination	Via	Distance(in kms)
1	V-EXP KNP-1	Kanakapura	Konanakunte Cross, Thalaghattapura, Silk Institute metro station, Kaggalipura, Somanahalli Toll,Harohalli,Dayananda Sagar MDC,Jain University Gate	46

=== Electronic Wipro Gate Bus Routes ===
Sl.No	Route Number	Destination	Via	Distance(in kms)
6	V-TMK-1A-EX	Tumakuru bus stand	Bannerghatta Road NICE Toll Plaza,Kanakapura Road NICE Toll Plaza,Mysore Road NICE Toll Plaza,NICE Road Magadi Road Junction,NICE Road Madavara (Tumkur Road NICE Toll), Nelamangala Toll, Kyathsandra Bus Stand	101
7	V-EXP-KNP-1A	Kanakapura	Bannerghatta Road NICE Toll Plaza,Kanakapura Road NICE Toll Plaza,Kaggalipura, Somanahalli Toll,Harohalli,Dayananda Sagar MDC,Jain University Gate	51
8	V-EXP-CPT-1A	Channapatna	Bannerghatta Road NICE Toll Plaza,Kanakapura Road NICE Toll Plaza,Mysore Road NICE Toll Plaza,Ramanagara bus stand	68

== Welfares and schemes ==
'Shakti Scheme' is not applicable on this bus services.

== See also ==
- Vajra
- Ashwamedha Classic Class
