= Girinagar =

- Neighborhood
- Location within Bengaluru
- Coordinates: 12.9421°N 77.5456°E
- Country: India
- State: Karnataka
- District: Bangalore Urban
- Metro: Bangalore
- Zone: Bangalore South
- Ward: 158, 162
- Elevation: 865 m (2,838 ft)

Languages
  - Official: Kannada
- Time zone: UTC+5:30 (IST)
- PIN: 560026, 560085
- Telephone code: 91-80
- Vehicle registration: KA 41
- Lok Sabha constituency: Bangalore South
- Vidhan Sabha constituency: Basavanagudi, Vijayanagar

Girinagar (formerly known as Writer's and Artist's Colony) is a premium residential area in Southwest Bengaluru, close to Mysore Road. This medium-sized locality is surrounded by Nayandahalli in the west, Byatarayanapura and Deepanjali Nagar in the north, Srinagar in the east and Hosakerehalli in the south. Its proximity to the Outer Ring Road, Mysore Road and NICE road offers excellent connectivity to the neighbouring areas. Prominent politicians like Shri. Tejasvi Surya(BJP), Member of Parliament(Lok Sabha) and Shri. Ravi Subramanya(BJP), the Member of Legislative Assembly for the Basavanagudi constituency, reside in Girinagar.

== Etymology ==
Girinagar was named after the former President of India V. V. Giri and also because of the Hirannayya Gudda (Hill). Giri in Sanskrit means hill.

== Administration ==
Girinagar lies in the Bengaluru South parliamentary constituency. The incumbent Member of Parliament of Bengaluru South is Shri. Tejasvi surya (BJP). Most of Girinagar lies in the Basavanagudi assembly constituency. The incumbent Member of Legislative assembly is Shri. Ravi Subramanya (BJP), who resides in Girinagar. However the part of Girinagar north of 50 Feet Road viz. Avalahalli, 3rd Phase, Muneshwara Block and Ganapathi Nagar sub localities lies in the Vijayanagar assembly constituency. The current sitting Member of Legislative assembly is Shri. M. Krishnappa (INC).

Girinagar is also a ward in the Bengaluru South zone of the BBMP (ward no. 162). It ranges from Nagendra Block in the east to Hosakerehalli Road in the west, from 50 Feet Road in the north to ORR in the south. and spans 1.77 km^{2}. The ward has been reserved for women and the current corporator is Smt. H.S. Lalitha (BJP). However the northernmost part of Girinagar (north of 50 Feet road) lies in the Deepanjali Nagar ward (ward no. 158), also in the Bengaluru South Zone and spans 2.09 km^{2}. This ward is also reserved for women and the current corporator is Smt. Malathi (BJP).
