= Nayandahalli =

Area of Bangalore, India

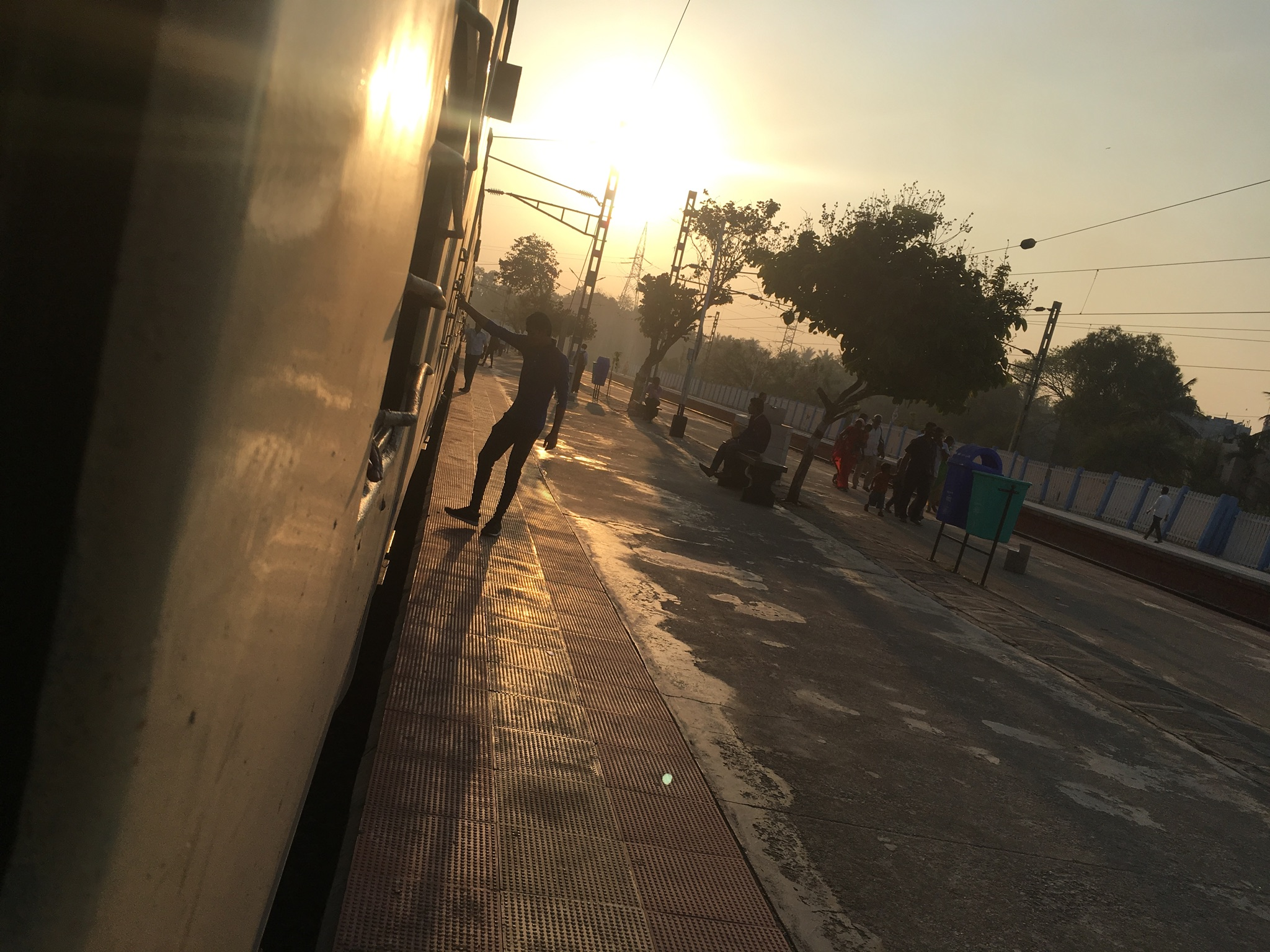
Nayandahalli Railway Station

Nayandahalli is a locality in West Bangalore, in Karnataka state India. It is located along the Mysore Road (SH-17). It is bordered by Banashankari, Rajarajeshwari Nagar and the Bangalore University campus (Jnanabharati).

It is a major transport junction in Bangalore, with Nayandahalli Railway Station, Mysore Road Satellite Bus Station, Mysore Road metro station and NICE Road terminal.
