= Banashankari TTMC =

Major bus station in Bengaluru, India

Banashankari TTMC Banashankari Raste Bas Nildāṇa
- Banashankri TTMC on right side as seen from banashankari circle

General information
- Other names: Banashankari Traffic and Transit Management Centre
- Location: Banashankari, Bengaluru; Karnataka-560070; India
- Coordinates: 12.917765°N 77.572995°E
- System: BMTC,Karnataka KSRTC
- Owner: Intracity — BMTC; Intercity — Karnataka State Road Transport Corporation
- Operator: Intracity — BMTC; Intercity — Karnataka State Road Transport Corporation
- Platforms: 1
- Bus routes: Karnataka; Bengaluru Metropolitan Region
- Bus operators: BMTC; Karnataka State Road Transport Corporation
- Connections: Green Line Banashankari metro station

Construction
- Structure type: At-grade
- Parking: Available
- Accessible: Yes

Other information
- Station code: 560070

History
- Opened: 4th December,2011
Location

Banashankari TTMC is a key bus station hub located on Kanakapura Road in the Banashankari area of Bengaluru, India. It is operated by the Bengaluru Metropolitan Transport Corporation(BMTC) and Karnataka State Road Transport Corporation (KSRTC) and operates 24 hours a day, serving both local and long-distance bus passengers. It is one of the busiest bus stand in Bengaluru.This bus stand is operates mostly by BMTC.

== History ==
The Banashankari TTMC project was started in November 2008 and was the 10th TTMC at that time to be inaugurated on 4 December 2011 by then Chief Minister of Karnataka D V Sadananda Gowda.It was built at cost of 33.4 crores.

== Location and connectivity ==
It is situated in Banashankari area in Bengaluru.It is near to Banashankari Amma Temple.This bus stand is also connected by Banashankari metro station which serves this bus stand as important transit point.

== Bus Routes ==
This bus stand is a key hub for BMTC and KSRTC.It connects major parts of the city like Attibele,Kadugodi,Central Silk Board(served by BMTC) and connects major towns like Kanakpura (served by KSRTC).Vajra Vistara bus service to Kanakpura starts from here.

Serial Number	Route	Terminus	Via
1	KIA-5	Kempegowda International Airport	JP Nagar 1st Phase, Indira Gandhi Circle, Marenahalli, Jayanagar 5th Block, Jayanagar TTMC, Ashoka Pillar, Wilson Garden, Shantinagar TTMC, Richmond Circle, Museum Road, Chinnaswamy Stadium, Cubbon Park Metro, Palace Guttahalli, Mekhri Circle, Hebbal, Esteem Mall, Yelahanka Air Force, Sadahalli Gate
2	500A	Hebbal	Sangam Circle, Marenahalli, Ragigudda Temple, Jayadeva Hospital, BTM Layout, Central Silk Board, HSR BDA Complex, Agara Junction, Sarjapura Ring Road Junction, Bellandur, Eco Space, Kadubeesanahalli, Marathahalli Bridge (Kalamandir), Doddanekundi, EMC2, Mahadevapura Ring Road, KR Puram Railway Station, Tin Factory, Kasturi Nagar, Horamavu, Kalyan Nagar, Hennur Junction, Nagawara Junction, Manyata Tech Park, Kempapura
3	500CA	ITPL	Sangam Circle, Marenahalli, Ragigudda Temple, Jayadeva Hospital, BTM Layout, Central Silk Board, HSR BDA Complex, Agara Junction, Sarjapura Ring Road Junction, Bellandur, Eco Space, Kadubeesanahalli, Marathahalli Bridge, Kundalahalli Gate, AECS Layout Cross, Kundalahalli Colony, Graphite India, Vydehi Hospital, Sathya Sai Hospital
4	500CK	Kadugodi	Sangam Circle, Marenahalli, Ragigudda Temple, Jayadeva Hospital, BTM Layout, Central Silk Board, HSR BDA Complex, Agara Junction, Sarjapura Ring Road Junction, Bellandur, Eco Space, Kadubeesanahalli, Marathahalli Bridge, Kundalahalli Gate, AECS Layout Cross, Kundalahalli Colony, Graphite India, Vydehi Hospital, Sathya Sai Hospital, ITPL, Hope Farm
5	500L	Tin Factory	Sangam Circle, Marenahalli, Ragigudda Temple, Jayadeva Hospital, BTM Layout, Central Silk Board, HSR BDA Complex, Agara Junction, Sarjapura Ring Road Junction, Bellandur, Eco Space, Kadubeesanahalli, Marathahalli Bridge (Kalamandir), Doddanekundi, EMC2, Mahadevapura Ring Road, KR Puram Railway Station
6	600F	Attibele	Sangam Circle, Marenahalli, Ragigudda Temple, Jayadeva Hospital, BTM Layout, Central Silk Board, Bommanahalli, Kudlu Gate, Hosa Road, Electronic City, Huskur Gate, Hebbagodi, Bommasandra, Chandapura, Neraluru, Guddahatti Gate
7	EXP-600F	Attibele	Sangam Circle, Marenahalli, Ragigudda Temple, Jayadeva Hospital, BTM Layout, Central Silk Board, Bommanahalli, Electronic City, Huskur Gate, Hebbagodi, Bommasandra, Chandapura, Neraluru, Guddahatti Gate

== See also ==
- Atal Bihari Vajpayee TTMC
- Mysuru Road Bus Station
