= Vajra Bus, BMTC =

Indian public bus transportation service in Bengaluru

Vayu Vajra
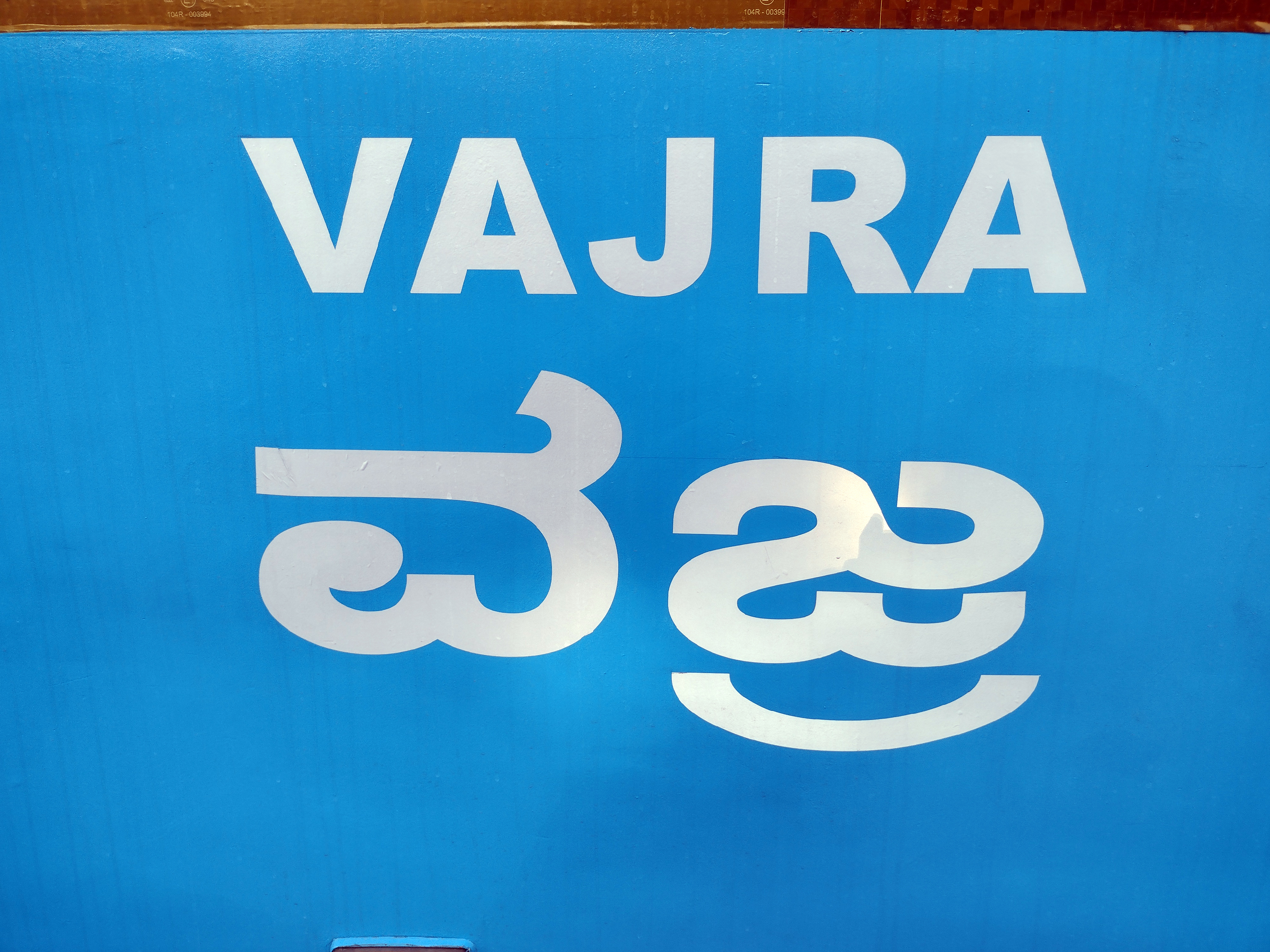

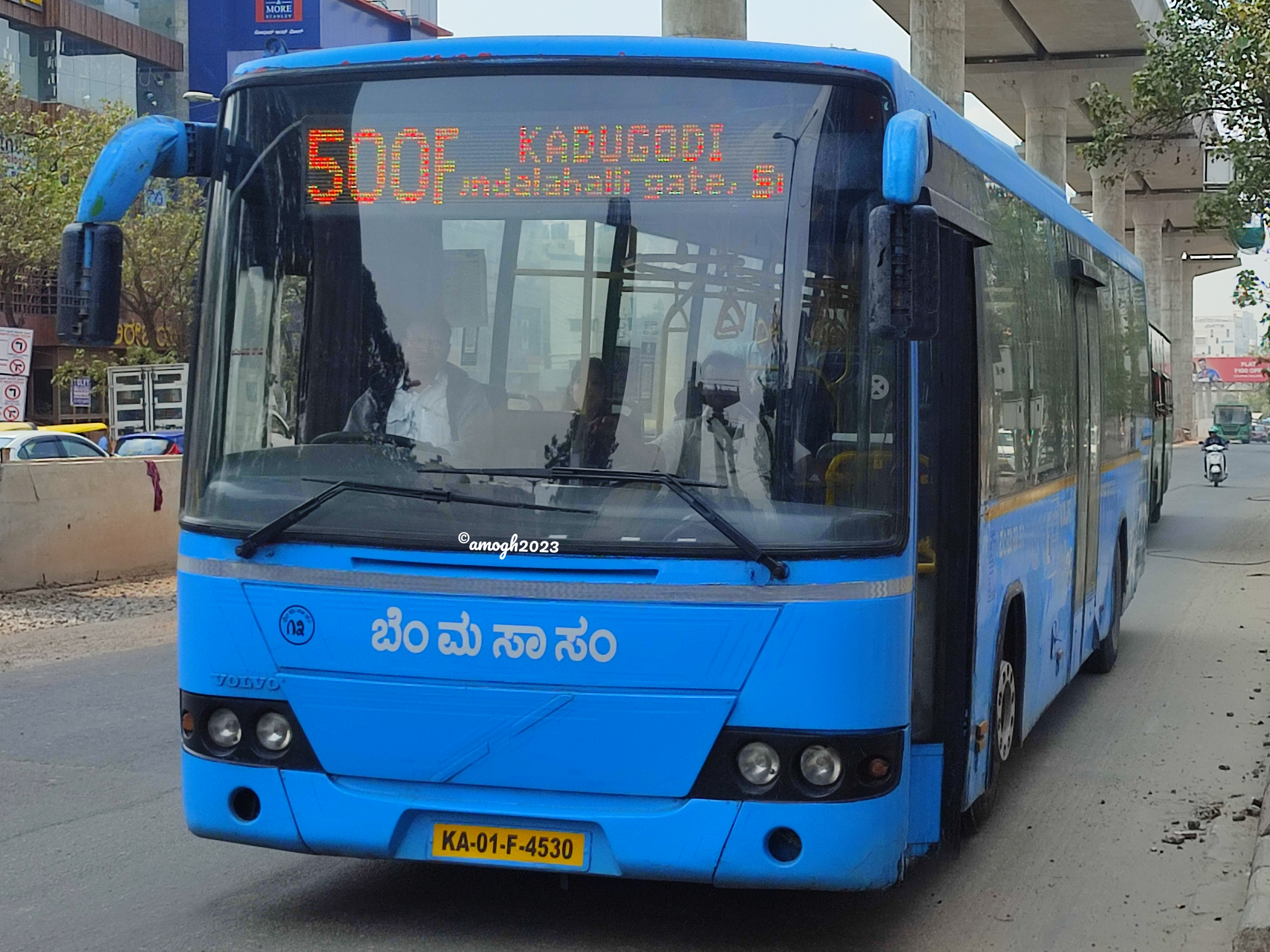
- Vajra bus heading towards Kadugodi
- Parent: Bangalore Metropolitan Transport Corporation
- Headquarters: Bengaluru, Karnataka, India
- Service area: Bengaluru
- Service type: AC Volvo,Switch bus
- Routes: 45
- Depots: Kamakya etc.
- Fuel type: Diesel,Electric
- Operator: Bangalore Metropolitan Transport Corporation
- Website: mybmtc.karnataka.gov.in/storage/pdf-files/VajraForm3Eng.pdf

Vajra (transl. Diamond) is a series of city Public transport bus service owned by the Government of Karnataka's public road transport department BMTC, in Bengaluru, Karnataka, India. It is an AC bus service operated using Volvo 8400LE, Corona, UD SLF and Switch EiV 12 buses with a light blue livery running on important routes serving the tech parks, industrial areas, major bus stations and major residential areas.

== Routes ==
=== Metro Feeder Routes ===
Sl.No	Route Number	Origin	Terminus	Via
1	MF-1C	KR Puram Metro Station	Central Silk Board	Mahadevapura Ring Road, EMC2, Doddanekundi, Marathahalli Bridge (Kalamandir), Kadubeesanahalli, Eco Space, Bellandur, Sarjapura Ring Road Junction, Agara Junction, HSR BDA Complex
2	MF-1D	KR Puram Metro Station	Sarjapur	Mahadevapura Ring Road, EMC2, Doddanekundi, Marathahalli Bridge (Kalamandir), Kadubeesanahalli, Eco Space, Bellandur, Sarjapura Ring Road Junction, Bellandur Gate, Doddakannalli, Kodati Gate, Dommasandra, Sompura
3	MF 5	Sir M Visveswaraya Railway Station	Central Silk Board	Swami Vivekananda Road Metro Station, Chinmaya Mission Hospital, Indiranagar Police Station, Doopanahalli, Domlur Bridge, Sony Signal, Koramangala Water Tank, Madiwala
4	MF 6	Swami Vivekananda Road metro station	Central Silk Board	Indiranagar Police Station, Doopanahalli, Domlur Bridge, Sony Signal, Koramangala Water Tank, Madiwala

=== Express Routes ===
Sl.No	Route Number	Origin	Terminus	Via
1	240MD	Kempegowda Bus Station (Majestic)	Magadi	Magadi Toll Gate, Summanahalli, Sunkadakatte, Tavarekere, Hosapete Gate
2	258DK	Kempegowda Bus Station (Majestic)	Dabaspete	Central, Malleshwaram, Yeshwanthpur Railway Station, Goraguntepalya, Madavara, Nelamangala
3	285M	Kempegowda Bus Station (Majestic)	Doddaballapur	Palace Guttahalli, Mekhri Circle, Hebbal, Esteem Mall, Kodigehalli, Allalasandra, Yelahanka, Rajanukunte
4	298MN	Kempegowda Bus Station (Majestic)	Chikkaballapur	Palace Guttahalli, Mekhri Circle, Hebbal, Esteem Mall, Kodigehalli, Allalasandra, Yelahanka, Bagalur Cross, Yelahanka Air Force, Hunasamaranahalli, Chikkajala, Sadahalli Gate, Airport Trumpet, Devanahalli Bypass
5	360B	Kempegowda Bus Station (Majestic)	Attibelle	Maharani College, Corporation, Richmond Circle, Shantinagar, Dairy Circle, Madiwala, Central Silk Board, Bommanahalli, Electronic City, Huskur Gate, Hebbagodi, Bommasandra, Chandapura, Neraluru, Guddahatti Gate
6	500D	Central Silk Board	Hebbal	Sarjapura Ring Road Junction, Eco Space, Kadubeesanahalli, Marathahalli Bridge (Kalamandir), EMC2, KR Puram Railway Station, Tin Factory, Manyata Tech Park
7	600F	Banashankari	Attibelle	Sangam Circle, Marenahalli, Ragigudda Temple, Jayadeva Hospital, BTM Layout, Central Silk Board, Bommanahalli, Electronic City, Huskur Gate, Hebbagodi, Bommasandra, Chandapura, Neraluru, Guddahatti Gate

=== Wonderla Routes ===
Sl.No	Route Number	Origin From City	Via
1	226KBS	Kempegowda Bus Station (Majestic)	Cottonpete, Sirsi Circle, Mysore Road Bus Station, Nayandahalli, Kengeri, Anchepalya, Kumbalagodu, Hejjala
2	226HSR	HSR BDA Complex	Central Silk Board, BTM Layout, Jayadeva Hospital, Ragigudda Temple, Sangam Circle, Banashankari, Kadirenahalli, Kamakya, Hosakerehalli, Nayandahalli, Kengeri, Anchepalya, Kumbalagodu, Hejjala
3	226CSB	Central Silk Board	BTM Layout, Jayadeva Hospital, Ragigudda Temple, Sangam Circle, Banashankari, Kadirenahalli, Kamakya, Hosakerehalli, Nayandahalli, Kengeri, Anchepalya, Kumbalagodu, Hejjala
4	226WF	Whitefield TTMC (Vydehi Hospital)	Graphite India, AECS Layout Cross, Kundalahalli Gate, Marathahalli Bridge, HAL, Dommalur, Richmond Circle, Corporation, Kempegowda Bus Station, Cottonpete, Sirsi Circle, Mysore Road Bus Station, Nayandahalli, Kengeri, Anchepalya, Kumbalagodu, Hejjala

=== Outer Ring Road Routes ===
Sl.No	Route Number	Origin	Terminus	Via
1	MF-1C	KR Puram Metro Station	Central Silk Board	Mahadevapura Ring Road, EMC2, Doddanekundi, Marathahalli Bridge (Kalamandir), Kadubeesanahalli, Eco Space, Bellandur, Sarjapura Ring Road Junction, Agara Junction, HSR BDA Complex
2	MF-1D	KR Puram Metro Station	Sarjapur	Mahadevapura Ring Road, EMC2, Doddanekundi, Marathahalli Bridge (Kalamandir), Kadubeesanahalli, Eco Space, Bellandur, Sarjapura Ring Road Junction, Bellandur Gate, Doddakannalli, Kodati Gate, Dommasandra, Sompura
3	500A	Banashankari	Hebbal	Sangam Circle, Marenahalli, Ragigudda Temple, Jayadeva Hospital, BTM Layout, Central Silk Board, HSR BDA Complex, Agara Junction, Sarjapura Ring Road Junction, Bellandur, Eco Space, Kadubeesanahalli, Marathahalli Bridge (Kalamandir), Doddanekundi, EMC2, Mahadevapura Ring Road, KR Puram Railway Station, Tin Factory, Kasturi Nagar, Horamavu, Kalyan Nagar, Hennur Junction, Nagawara Junction, Manyata Tech Park, Kempapura
3A	500A	Kamakya (Depot 13)	Hebbal	Kadirenahalli Cross, Banashankari, Sangam Circle, Marenahalli, Ragigudda Temple, Jayadeva Hospital, BTM Layout, Central Silk Board, HSR BDA Complex, Agara Junction, Sarjapura Ring Road Junction, Bellandur, Eco Space, Kadubeesanahalli, Marathahalli Bridge (Kalamandir), Doddanekundi, EMC2, Mahadevapura Ring Road, KR Puram Railway Station, Tin Factory, Kasturi Nagar, Horamavu, Kalyan Nagar, Hennur Junction, Nagawara Junction, Manyata Tech Park, Kempapura
4	500BC	Central Silk Board	BEL Circle	HSR BDA Complex, Agara Junction, Sarjapura Ring Road Junction, Bellandur, Eco Space, Kadubeesanahalli, Marathahalli Bridge (Kalamandir), Doddanekundi, EMC2, Mahadevapura Ring Road, KR Puram Railway Station, Tin Factory, Kasturi Nagar, Horamavu, Kalyan Nagar, Hennur Junction, Nagawara Junction, Manyata Tech Park, Kempapura, Hebbal, Kuvempu Circle
5	500CA	Banashankari	ITPL	Sangam Circle, Marenahalli, Ragigudda Temple, Jayadeva Hospital, BTM Layout, Central Silk Board, HSR BDA Complex, Agara Junction, Sarjapura Ring Road Junction, Bellandur, Eco Space, Kadubeesanahalli, Marathahalli Bridge, Kundalahalli Gate, AECS Layout Cross, Kundalahalli Colony, Graphite India, Vydehi Hospital, Sathya Sai Hospital
6	500CK	Banashankari	Kadugodi	Sangam Circle, Marenahalli, Ragigudda Temple, Jayadeva Hospital, BTM Layout, Central Silk Board, HSR BDA Complex, Agara Junction, Sarjapura Ring Road Junction, Bellandur, Eco Space, Kadubeesanahalli, Marathahalli Bridge, Kundalahalli Gate, AECS Layout Cross, Kundalahalli Colony, Graphite India, Vydehi Hospital, Sathya Sai Hospital, ITPL, Hope Farm
7	500D	Central Silk Board	Hebbal	HSR BDA Complex, Agara Junction, Sarjapura Ring Road Junction, Bellandur, Eco Space, Kadubeesanahalli, Marathahalli Bridge (Kalamandir), Doddanekundi, EMC2, Mahadevapura Ring Road, KR Puram Railway Station, Tin Factory, Kasturi Nagar, Horamavu, Kalyan Nagar, Hennur Junction, Nagawara Junction, Manyata Tech Park, Kempapura
8	EXP-500D	Central Silk Board	Hebbal	Sarjapura Ring Road Junction, Eco Space, Kadubeesanahalli, Marathahalli Bridge (Kalamandir), EMC2, KR Puram Railway Station, Tin Factory, Manyata Tech Park
9	500DB	Central Silk Board	Bhartiya City	HSR BDA Complex, Agara Junction, Sarjapura Ring Road Junction, Bellandur, Eco Space, Kadubeesanahalli, Marathahalli Bridge (Kalamandir), Doddanekundi, EMC2, Mahadevapura Ring Road, KR Puram Railway Station, Tin Factory, Kasturi Nagar, Horamavu, Kalyan Nagar, Hennur Junction, Nagawara Junction, Ashwath Nagar, Thanisandra, RK Hegde Nagar
10	500DE	Hebbal	Kadugodi	Kempapura, Manyata Tech Park, Nagawara Junction, Hennur Junction, Kalyan Nagar, Horamavu, Kasturi Nagar, Tin Factory, KR Pura Railway Station, Mahadevapura, Garudacharpalya, Hoodi, Graphite India, Vydehi Hospital, Sathya Sai Hospital, ITPL, Hope Farm
11	500DF	Hebbal	ITPL	Kempapura, Manyata Tech Park, Nagawara Junction, Hennur Junction, Kalyan Nagar, Horamavu, Kasturi Nagar, Tin Factory, KR Pura Railway Station, Mahadevapura, Garudacharpalya, Hoodi
12	500DP	Central Silk Board	Goraguntepalya	HSR BDA Complex, Agara Junction, Sarjapura Ring Road Junction, Bellandur, Eco Space, Kadubeesanahalli, Marathahalli Bridge (Kalamandir), Doddanekundi, EMC2, Mahadevapura Ring Road, KR Puram Railway Station, Tin Factory, Kasturi Nagar, Horamavu, Kalyan Nagar, Hennur Junction, Nagawara Junction, Manyata Tech Park, Kempapura, Hebbal, Kuvempu Circle, BEL Circle, Jalahalli Cross.
13	500E	Hebbal	Electronic City Wipro Gate	Kempapura, Manyata Tech Park, Nagawara Junction, Hennur Junction, Kalyan Nagar, Horamavu, Kasturi Nagar, Tin Factory, KR Pura Railway Station, Mahadevapura Ring Road, EMC2, Doddanekundi, Marathahalli Bridge (Kalamandir), Kadubeesanahalli, Eco Space, Bellandur, Sarjapura Ring Road Junction, Agara Junction, HSR BDA Complex, Central Silk Board, Bommanahalli, Kudlu Gate, Hosa Road Junction, Beratena Agrahara
14	500F	Central Silk Board	Kadugodi	HSR BDA Complex, Agara Junction, Sarjapura Ring Road Junction, Bellandur, Eco Space, Kadubeesanahalli, Marathahalli Bridge, Kundalahalli Gate, AECS Layout Cross, Kundalahalli Colony, Graphite India, Vydehi Hospital, Sathya Sai Hospital, ITPL, Hope Farm
15	500FA	Kuvempunagar (BTM Layout)	Kadugodi	Central Silk Board, HSR BDA Complex, Agara Junction, Sarjapura Ring Road Junction, Bellandur, Eco Space, Kadubeesanahalli, Marathahalli Bridge, Kundalahalli Gate, AECS Layout Cross, Kundalahalli Colony, Graphite India, Vydehi Hospital, Sathya Sai Hospital, ITPL, Hope Farm
16	500HS	Hebbal	Sarjapur	Kempapura, Manyata Tech Park, Nagawara Junction, Hennur Junction, Kalyan Nagar, Horamavu, Kasturi Nagar, Tin Factory, KR Pura Railway Station, Mahadevapura Ring Road, EMC2, Doddanekundi, Marathahalli Bridge (Kalamandir), Kadubeesanahalli, Eco Space, Bellandur, Sarjapura Ring Road Junction, Bellandur Gate, Doddakannalli, Kodati Gate, Dommasandra, Sompura
17	500HK	Hebbal	Hoskote	Kempapura, Manyata Tech Park, Nagawara Junction, Hennur Junction, Kalyan Nagar, Horamavu, Kasturi Nagar, Tin Factory, ITI Gate, KR Puram, Subashnagar, Medahalli, Budigere Cross, Katamanallur Gate, Hoskote Toll Plaza
18	500HE	Marathahalli	Hoskote	Kundalahalli Gate, AECS Layout Cross, Kundalahalli Colony, Graphite India, Vydehi Hospital, Sathya Sai Hospital, ITPL, Hope Farm, Kadugodi, Belathur, Katamanalluru
19	500QK	BEL Circle	Kadugodi	Kuvempu Circle, Hebbal, Kempapura, Manyata Tech Park, Nagawara Junction, Hennur Junction, Kalyan Nagar, Horamavu, Kasturi Nagar, Tin Factory, KR Pura Railway Station, Mahadevapura, Garudacharpalya, Hoodi, ITPL, Hope Farm
20	500L	Banashankari	Tin Factory	Sangam Circle, Marenahalli, Ragigudda Temple, Jayadeva Hospital, BTM Layout, Central Silk Board, HSR BDA Complex, Agara Junction, Sarjapura Ring Road Junction, Bellandur, Eco Space, Kadubeesanahalli, Marathahalli Bridge (Kalamandir), Doddanekundi, EMC2, Mahadevapura Ring Road, KR Puram Railway Station
21	500N	Central Silk Board	Tin Factory	HSR BDA Complex, Agara Junction, Sarjapura Ring Road Junction, Bellandur, Eco Space, Kadubeesanahalli, Marathahalli Bridge (Kalamandir), Doddanekundi, EMC2, Mahadevapura Ring Road, KR Puram Railway Station
22	500NA	Central Silk Board	ITPL	HSR BDA Complex, Agara Junction, Sarjapura Ring Road Junction, Bellandur, Eco Space, Kadubeesanahalli, Marathahalli Bridge, Kundalahalli Gate, AECS Layout Cross, Kundalahalli Colony, Graphite India, Vydehi Hospital, Sathya Sai Hospital

=== Central Silk Board Routes ===
Sl.No	Route Number	Terminus	Via
1	226CSB	Wonderla	BTM Layout, Jayadeva Hospital, Ragigudda Temple, Sangam Circle, Banashankari, Kadirenahalli, Kamakya, Hosakerehalli, Nayandahalli, Kengeri, Anchepalya, Kumbalagodu, Hejjala
2	MF-1C	KR Puram Metro Station	HSR BDA Complex, Agara Junction, Sarjapura Ring Road Junction, Bellandur, Eco Space, Kadubeesanahalli, Marathahalli Bridge (Kalamandir), Doddanekundi, EMC2, Mahadevapura Ring Road
3	MF-6	Swami Vivekananda Road Metro Station	Madiwala, Koramangala Sony Signal, Ejipura, Dommalur, Doopanahalli, Indiranagar Police Station/KFC, Binnamangala
4	201D	Swami Vivekananda Road Metro Station	Madiwala, Koramangala Sony Signal, Ejipura, Dommalur, Doopanahalli, Indiranagar Police Station/KFC, Chinmaya Mission Hospital.
5	500BC	BEL Circle	HSR BDA Complex, Agara Junction, Sarjapura Ring Road Junction, Bellandur, Eco Space, Kadubeesanahalli, Marathahalli Bridge (Kalamandir), Doddanekundi, EMC2, Mahadevapura Ring Road, KR Puram Railway Station, Tin Factory, Kasturi Nagar, Horamavu, Kalyan Nagar, Hennur Junction, Nagawara Junction, Manyata Tech Park, Kempapura, Hebbal, Kuvempu Circle
6	500D	Hebbal	HSR BDA Complex, Agara Junction, Sarjapura Ring Road Junction, Bellandur, Eco Space, Kadubeesanahalli, Marathahalli Bridge (Kalamandir), Doddanekundi, EMC2, Mahadevapura Ring Road, KR Puram Railway Station, Tin Factory, Kasturi Nagar, Horamavu, Kalyan Nagar, Hennur Junction, Nagawara Junction, Manyata Tech Park, Kempapura
7	EXP-500D	Hebbal	Sarjapura Ring Road Junction, Eco Space, Kadubeesanahalli, Marathahalli Bridge (Kalamandir), EMC2, KR Puram Railway Station, Tin Factory, Manyata Tech Park
8	500DB	Bhartiya City	HSR BDA Complex, Agara Junction, Sarjapura Ring Road Junction, Bellandur, Eco Space, Kadubeesanahalli, Marathahalli Bridge (Kalamandir), Doddanekundi, EMC2, Mahadevapura Ring Road, KR Puram Railway Station, Tin Factory, Kasturi Nagar, Horamavu, Kalyan Nagar, Hennur Junction, Nagawara Junction, Ashwath Nagar, Thanisandra, RK Hegde Nagar
9	500DP	Goraguntepalya	HSR BDA Complex, Agara Junction, Sarjapura Ring Road Junction, Bellandur, Eco Space, Kadubeesanahalli, Marathahalli Bridge (Kalamandir), Doddanekundi, EMC2, Mahadevapura Ring Road, KR Puram Railway Station, Tin Factory, Kasturi Nagar, Horamavu, Kalyan Nagar, Hennur Junction, Nagawara Junction, Manyata Tech Park, Kempapura, Hebbal, Kuvempu Circle, BEL Circle, Jalahalli Cross.
10	500F	Kadugodi	HSR BDA Complex, Agara Junction, Sarjapura Ring Road Junction, Bellandur, Eco Space, Kadubeesanahalli, Marathahalli Bridge, Kundalahalli Gate, AECS Layout Cross, Kundalahalli Colony, Graphite India, Vydehi Hospital, Sathya Sai Hospital, ITPL, Hope Farm
11	500N	Tin Factory	HSR BDA Complex, Agara Junction, Sarjapura Ring Road Junction, Bellandur, Eco Space, Kadubeesanahalli, Marathahalli Bridge (Kalamandir), Doddanekundi, EMC2, Mahadevapura Ring Road, KR Puram Railway Station
12	500NA	ITPL	HSR BDA Complex, Agara Junction, Sarjapura Ring Road Junction, Bellandur, Eco Space, Kadubeesanahalli, Marathahalli Bridge, Kundalahalli Gate, AECS Layout Cross, Kundalahalli Colony, Graphite India, Vydehi Hospital, Sathya Sai Hospital

=== Banashankari Bus Routes ===
Sl.No	Route Number	Terminus	Via
1	500A	Hebbal	Sangam Circle, Marenahalli, Ragigudda Temple, Jayadeva Hospital, BTM Layout, Central Silk Board, HSR BDA Complex, Agara Junction, Sarjapura Ring Road Junction, Bellandur, Eco Space, Kadubeesanahalli, Marathahalli Bridge (Kalamandir), Doddanekundi, EMC2, Mahadevapura Ring Road, KR Puram Railway Station, Tin Factory, Kasturi Nagar, Horamavu, Kalyan Nagar, Hennur Junction, Nagawara Junction, Manyata Tech Park, Kempapura
2	500CA	ITPL	Sangam Circle, Marenahalli, Ragigudda Temple, Jayadeva Hospital, BTM Layout, Central Silk Board, HSR BDA Complex, Agara Junction, Sarjapura Ring Road Junction, Bellandur, Eco Space, Kadubeesanahalli, Marathahalli Bridge, Kundalahalli Gate, AECS Layout Cross, Kundalahalli Colony, Graphite India, Vydehi Hospital, Sathya Sai Hospital
3	500CK	Kadugodi	Sangam Circle, Marenahalli, Ragigudda Temple, Jayadeva Hospital, BTM Layout, Central Silk Board, HSR BDA Complex, Agara Junction, Sarjapura Ring Road Junction, Bellandur, Eco Space, Kadubeesanahalli, Marathahalli Bridge, Kundalahalli Gate, AECS Layout Cross, Kundalahalli Colony, Graphite India, Vydehi Hospital, Sathya Sai Hospital, ITPL, Hope Farm
4	500L	Tin Factory	Sangam Circle, Marenahalli, Ragigudda Temple, Jayadeva Hospital, BTM Layout, Central Silk Board, HSR BDA Complex, Agara Junction, Sarjapura Ring Road Junction, Bellandur, Eco Space, Kadubeesanahalli, Marathahalli Bridge (Kalamandir), Doddanekundi, EMC2, Mahadevapura Ring Road, KR Puram Railway Station
5	600F	Attibelle	Sangam Circle, Marenahalli, Ragigudda Temple, Jayadeva Hospital, BTM Layout, Central Silk Board, Bommanahalli, Kudlu Gate, Hosa Road, Electronic City, Huskur Gate, Hebbagodi, Bommasandra, Chandapura, Neraluru, Guddahatti Gate
6	EXP-600F	Attibelle	Sangam Circle, Marenahalli, Ragigudda Temple, Jayadeva Hospital, BTM Layout, Central Silk Board, Bommanahalli, Electronic City, Huskur Gate, Hebbagodi, Bommasandra, Chandapura, Neraluru, Guddahatti Gate

=== Kadugodi Routes ===
Sl.No	Route Number	Terminus	Via
1	331A	Shivajinagar	Hope Farm, ITPL, Sathya Sai Hospital, Vydehi Hospital, Graphite India, Kundalahalli Colony, AECS Layout Cross, Kundalahalli Gate, Marathahalli Bridge, HAL, Dommalur, Trinity Circle
2	333E	Kempegowda Bus Station (Majestic) (Via Varthur, Siddapura)	Hope Farm, Whitefield, Varthur Kodi, Siddapura, Kundalahalli Gate, Marathahalli Bridge, HAL, Dommalur, Richmond Circle, Corporation Circle
3	335E	Kempegowda Bus Station (Majestic) (via ITPL, Vydehi Hospital, AECS Layout)	Hope Farm, ITPL, Sathya Sai Hospital, Vydehi Hospital, Graphite India, Kundalahalli Colony, AECS Layout Cross, Kundalahalli Gate, Marathahalli Bridge, HAL, Dommalur, Richmond Circle, Corporation Circle
4	500CK	Banashankari	Hope Farm, ITPL, Sathya Sai Hospital, Vydehi Hospital, Graphite India, Kundalahalli Colony, AECS Layout Cross, Kundalahalli Gate, Marathahalli Bridge, Kadubeesanahalli, Eco Space, Bellandur, Sarjapura Ring Road Junction, Agara Junction, HSR BDA Complex, Central Silk Board, BTM Layout, Jayadeva Hospital, Ragigudda Temple, Marenahalli, Sangam Circle
5	500DE	Hebbal	Hope Farm, ITPL, Hoodi, Garudacharpalya, Mahadevapura, KR Puram Railway Station, Tin Factory, Kasturi Nagar, Horamavu, Kalyan Nagar, Hennur Junction, Nagawara Junction, Manyata Tech Park, Kempapura
6	500F	Central Silk Board	Hope Farm, ITPL, Sathya Sai Hospital, Vydehi Hospital, Graphite India, Kundalahalli Colony, AECS Layout Cross, Kundalahalli Gate, Marathahalli Bridge, Kadubeesanahalli, Eco Space, Bellandur, Sarjapura Ring Road Junction, Agara Junction, HSR BDA Complex
7	500FA	Kuvempunagar (BTM Layout)	Hope Farm, ITPL, Sathya Sai Hospital, Vydehi Hospital, Graphite India, Kundalahalli Colony, AECS Layout Cross, Kundalahalli Gate, Marathahalli Bridge, Kadubeesanahalli, Eco Space, Bellandur, Sarjapura Ring Road Junction, Agara Junction, HSR BDA Complex, Central Silk Board
8	500QK	BEL Circle	Hope Farm, ITPL, Hoodi, Garudacharpalya, Mahadevapura, KR Puram Railway Station, Tin Factory, Kasturi Nagar, Horamavu, Kalyan Nagar, Hennur Junction, Nagawara Junction, Manyata Tech Park, Kempapura, Hebbal, Kuvempu Circle

=== ITPL Routes ===
Sl.No	Route Number	Terminus	Via
1	335T	Kempegowda Bus Station (Majestic)	Sathya Sai Hospital, Vydehi Hospital, Graphite India, Kundalahalli Colony, AECS Layout Cross, Kundalahalli Gate, Marathahalli Bridge, HAL, Dommalur, Richmond Circle, Corporation Circle
2	500CA	Banashankari	Sathya Sai Hospital, Vydehi Hospital, Graphite India, Kundalahalli Colony, AECS Layout Cross, Kundalahalli Gate, Marathahalli Bridge, Kadubeesanahalli, Eco Space, Bellandur, Sarjapura Ring Road Junction, Agara Junction, HSR BDA Complex, Central Silk Board, BTM Layout, Jayadeva Hospital, Ragigudda Temple, Marenahalli, Sangam Circle
3	500DF	Hebbal	Hoodi, Garudacharpalya, Mahadevapura, KR Puram Railway Station, Tin Factory, Kasturi Nagar, Horamavu, Kalyan Nagar, Hennur Junction, Nagawara Junction, Manyata Tech Park, Kempapura
4	500NA	Central Silk Board	Sathya Sai Hospital, Vydehi Hospital, Graphite India, Kundalahalli Colony, AECS Layout Cross, Kundalahalli Gate, Marathahalli Bridge, Kadubeesanahalli, Eco Space, Bellandur, Sarjapura Ring Road Junction, Agara Junction, HSR BDA Complex

=== Kempegowda Bus Station Routes ===
Sl.No	Route Number	Terminus	Via
1	G7	Janapriya Township	Okalipuram, Rajajinagar, KHB Colony, Sumanahalli, Kottigepalya, Sunkadakatte, Anjananagar, Bydarahalli Kadabagere Cross
2	25A	Kuvempunagar (BTM Layout)	Maharani College, Corporation, Lalbagh, Ashoka Pillar, Jayanagar 3rd Block, Jayanagar 4th Block, East End Jayanagar, MICO Layout, BTM Layout Circle.
3	45G	Kamakya	Chamrajpet, Hanumanthanagar, Hosakerehalli, Kathriguppe
4	129	Shivajinagar	Maharani College, Vidhana Soudha, Balekundri Circle
5	EXP-240MD	Magadi	Magadi Toll Gate, Summanahalli, Sunkadakatte, Tavarekere, Hosapete Gate
6	EXP-258DK	Dabaspete	Central, Malleshwaram, Yeshwanthpur Railway Station, Goraguntepalya, Madavara, Nelamangala
7	285M	Doddaballapur	Shivananda Stores, Palace Guttahalli, Mekhri Circle, Hebbal, Esteem Mall, Kodigehalli, Yelahanka, Puttenahalli, Rajanukunte, Marasandra, Bashettihalli
8	EXP-285M	Doddaballapur	Palace Guttahalli, Mekhri Circle, Hebbal, Esteem Mall, Yelahanka, Rajanukunte
9	298MN	Chikkaballapur	Shivananda Stores, Palace Guttahalli, Mekhri Circle, Hebbal, Esteem Mall, Kodigehalli, Allalasandra, Bagalur Cross, Yelahanka Air Force, Hunasamaranahalli, Chikkajala, Sadahalli Gate, Airport Trumpet, Devanahalli Bypass
10	EXP-298MN (Vajra Vistara)	Chikkaballapur	Shivananda Stores, Palace Guttahalli, Mekhri Circle, Hebbal, Esteem Mall, Kodigehalli, Allalasandra, Bagalur Cross, Yelahanka Air Force, Hunasamaranahalli, Chikkajala, Sadahalli Gate, Airport Trumpet, Devanahalli Bypass
11	300H	KR Pura Govt Hospital	Maharani College, Corporation, Richmond Circle, Mayohall, Trinity Circle, Halasuru, Indiranagar 100Ft Road, Swami Vivekananda Road Metro, Baiyappanahalli Metro, Tin Factory, ITI Gate
12	300MV	Sir M Visveswaraya Railway Station	Maharani College, Vidhana Soudha, Balekundri Circle, Vasanth Nagar, Cantonment Railway Station, Coles Road, Maruthi Seva Nagar
13	317A	Hoskote	Maharani College, Corporation, Richmond Circle, Mayohall, Trinity Circle, Halasuru, Indiranagar 100Ft Road, Swami Vivekananda Road Metro, Baiyappanahalli Metro, Tin Factory, ITI Gate, KR Puram, Subashnagar, Medahalli, Budigere Cross, Katamanallur Gate, Hoskote Toll Plaza
14	333E	Kadugodi (Via Siddapura, Varthur)	Maharani College, Corporation, Richmond Circle, Mayohall, Dommalur, HAL, Marathahalli Bridge, Kundalahalli Gate, Siddapura, Varthur Kodi, Whitefield, Hope Farm
15	335E	Kadugodi (Via AECS Layout, Vydehi Hospital, ITPL)	Maharani College, Corporation, Richmond Circle, Mayohall, Dommalur, HAL, Marathahalli Bridge, Kundalahalli Gate, AECS Layout Cross, Kundalahalli Colony, Graphite India, Vydehi Hospital, Sathya Sai Hospital, ITPL, Hope Farm
16	335T	ITPL	Maharani College, Corporation, Richmond Circle, Mayohall, Dommalur, HAL, Marathahalli Bridge, Kundalahalli Gate, AECS Layout Cross, Kundalahalli Colony, Graphite India, Vydehi Hospital, Sathya Sai Hospital
17	342F	Sarjapur	Maharani College, Corporation, Richmond Circle, Shantinagar, Dairy Circle, Madiwala, Koramangala, Jakkasandra, Agara Junction, Sarjapura Ring Road Junction, Bellandur Gate, Kaikondrahalli, Doddakannalli, Kodati Gate, Dommasandra, Sompura
18	342FD	Doddakanalli	Maharani College, Corporation, Richmond Circle, Shantinagar, Dairy Circle, Madiwala, Koramangala, Jakkasandra, Agara Junction, Sarjapura Ring Road Junction, Bellandur Gate, Kaikondrahalli
19	356M	Anekal	Maharani College, Corporation, Lalbagh, Dairy Circle, Madiwala, Koramangala Water Tank, Central Silk Board, Bommanahalli, Kudlu Gate, Hosa Road Junction, NICE Road Junction, Electronic City, Huskur Gate, Hebbagodi, Bommasandra, Chandapura, Surya Nagar, Iggalur, Karpura Gate, Kavalahosahalli
20	360B	Attibelle Circle	Maharani College, Corporation, Richmond Circle, Shantinagar, Dairy Circle, Madiwala, Central Silk Board, Bommanahalli, Kudlu Gate, Hosa Road Junction, NICE Road Junction, Electronic City, Huskur Gate, Hebbagodi, Bommasandra, Chandapura, Neraluru, Guddahatti Gate
21	360B (Flyover)	Attibelle Circle	Maharani College, Corporation, Richmond Circle, Shantinagar, Dairy Circle, Madiwala, Central Silk Board, Bommanahalli, Electronic City, Huskur Gate, Hebbagodi, Bommasandra, Chandapura, Neraluru, Guddahatti Gate
22	365	Bannerughatta	Maharani College, Corporation, Richmond Circle, Shantinagar, Dairy Circle, Jayadeva Hospital, Bilekahalli, Hulimavu, Kalena Agrahara, Gottigere, Basavanapura, Kalkere
23	365J	Jigani APC Circle	Maharani College, Corporation, Richmond Circle, Shantinagar, Dairy Circle, Jayadeva Hospital, Bilekahalli, Hulimavu, Kalena Agrahara, Gottigere, Basavanapura, Kalkere, Bannerughatta, Koppa Gate, Harapanahalli.

=== Shivaji Nagar Bus Routes ===
Sl.No	Route Number	Terminus	Via
1	129	Kempegowda Bus Station (Majestic)	Balekundri Circle, Vidhana Soudha, Maharani College, Mysore Bank
2	287A	Hebbal	Balekundri Circle, Vasanth Nagar, Jayamahal, Matadahalli, RT Nagar, Veternary College
3	331A	Kadugodi	Balekundri Circle, Manipal Center, Trinity Circle, Dommalur, HAL, Marathahalli Bridge, Kundalahalli Gate, AECS Layout Cross, Kundalahalli Colony, Graphite India, Vydehi Hospital, Sathya Sai Hospital, ITPL, Hope Farm

=== Hoskote Bus Routes ===
Sl.No	Route Number	Terminus	Via
1	317A	Kempegowda Bus Station (Majestic)	Hoskote Toll Plaza, Katamanallur Gate, Budigere Cross, Medahalli, Subashnagar, KR Puram, ITI Gate, Tin Factory, Baiyappanahalli, Swami Vivekananda Road, Binnamangala, Halasuru, Trinity Circle, Richmond Circle, Corporation, Mysore Bank
2	328H	Attibelle	Hoskote Toll Plaza, Katamanallur, Belathur, Kadugodi, Hope Farm, Varthur Kodi, Gunjur, Hegondanahalli, Dommasandra, Sompura, Sarjapur, Billapura, Bidaraguppe
3	500HE	Marathahalli	Hoskote Toll Plaza, Katamanallur, Belathur, Kadugodi, Hope Farm, ITPL, Sathya Sai Hospital, Vydehi Hospital, Graphite India, Kundalahalli Colony, AECS Layout Cross, Kundalahalli Gate
4	500HK	Hebbal	Hoskote Toll Plaza, Katamanallur Gate, Budigere Cross, Medahalli, Subashnagar, KR Puram, ITI Gate, Tin Factory, Kasturi Nagar, Horamavu, Kalyan Nagar, Hennur Junction, Nagawara Junction, Manyata Tech Park, Kempapura

=== Sarjapura Bus Routes ===
Sl.No	Route Number	Terminus	Via
1	MF-1D	KR Pura Metro Station	Sompura, Dommasandra, Kodati Gate, Doddakannalli, Bellandur Gate, Sarjapura Ring Road Junction, Bellandur, Eco Space, Kadubeesanahalli, Marathahalli Bridge (Kalamandir), Doddanekundi, EMC2, Mahadevapura Ring Road
2	342F	Kempegowda Bus Station (Majestic)	Sompura, Dommasandra, Kodati Gate, Doddakannalli, Bellandur Gate, Sarjapura Ring Road Junction, Agara Junction, Jakkasandra, Koramangala Water Tank, Madiwala, Dairy Circle, Shantinagar, Corporation
3	500HS	Hebbal	Sompura, Dommasandra, Kodati Gate, Doddakannalli, Bellandur Gate, Sarjapura Ring Road Junction, Bellandur, Eco Space, Kadubeesanahalli, Marathahalli Bridge (Kalamandir), Doddanekundi, EMC2, Mahadevapura Ring Road, KR Puram Railway Station, Tin Factory, Kasturi Nagar, Horamavu, Kalyan Nagar, Hennur Junction, Nagawara Junction, Manyata Tech Park, Kempapura

=== Attibelle Bus Routes ===
Sl.No	Route Number	Terminus	Via
1	328H	Hoskote	Bidaraguppe, Billapura, Sarjapur, Sompura, Dommasandra, Hegondanahalli, Gunjur, Varthur Kodi, Whitefield, Hope Farm, Kadugodi, Belathur, Katamanallur, Hoskote Toll Plaza
2	360B	Kempegowda Bus Station (Majestic)	Guddahatti Gate, Neraluru, Chandapura, Bommasandra, Hebbagodi, Huskur Gate, Electronic City, NICE Road Junction, Hosa Road Junction, Kudlu Gate, Bommanahalli, Central Silk Board, Madiwala, Dairy Circle, Shantinagar, Richmond Circle, Corporation, Mysore Bank
3	EXP-360B (Flyover)	Kempegowda Bus Station (Majestic)	Guddahatti Gate, Neraluru, Chandapura, Bommasandra, Hebbagodi, Huskur Gate, Electronic City, Bommanahalli, Central Silk Board, Madiwala, Dairy Circle, Shantinagar, Richmond Circle, Corporation, Mysore Bank
4	600F	Banashankari	Guddahatti Gate, Neraluru, Chandapura, Bommasandra, Hebbagodi, Huskur Gate, Electronic City, NICE Road Junction, Hosa Road, Kudlu Gate, Bommanahalli, Central Silk Board, BTM Layout, Jayadeva Hospital, Ragigudda Temple, Marenahalli, Sangam Circle
5	EXP-600F	Banashankari	Guddahatti Gate, Neraluru, Chandapura, Bommasandra, Hebbagodi, Huskur Gate, Electronic City, Bommanahalli, Central Silk Board, BTM Layout, Jayadeva Hospital, Ragigudda Temple, Marenahalli, Sangam Circle

=== Hebbal Bus Routes ===
Sl.No	Route Number	Terminus	Via
1	287A	Shivajinagar	Veternary College, RT Nagar, Matadahalli, Cantonment Railway Station, Balekundri Circle
2	500A	Banashankari	Kempapura, Manyata Tech Park, Nagawara Junction, Hennur Junction, Kalyan Nagar, Horamavu, Kasturi Nagar, Tin Factory, KR Pura Railway Station, Mahadevapura Ring Road, EMC2, Doddanekundi, Marathahalli Bridge (Kalamandir), Kadubeesanahalli, Eco Space, Bellandur, Sarjapura Ring Road Junction, Agara Junction, HSR BDA Complex, Central Silk Board, BTM Layout, Jayadeva Hospital, Ragigudda Temple, Marenahalli, Sangam Circle
3	500A	Kamakya (Depot 13)	Kempapura, Manyata Tech Park, Nagawara Junction, Hennur Junction, Kalyan Nagar, Horamavu, Kasturi Nagar, Tin Factory, KR Pura Railway Station, Mahadevapura Ring Road, EMC2, Doddanekundi, Marathahalli Bridge (Kalamandir), Kadubeesanahalli, Eco Space, Bellandur, Sarjapura Ring Road Junction, Agara Junction, HSR BDA Complex, Central Silk Board, BTM Layout, Jayadeva Hospital, Ragigudda Temple, Marenahalli, Sangam Circle, Banashankari, Kadirenahalli Cross
4	500D	Central Silk Board	Kempapura, Manyata Tech Park, Nagawara Junction, Hennur Junction, Kalyan Nagar, Horamavu, Kasturi Nagar, Tin Factory, KR Pura Railway Station, Mahadevapura Ring Road, EMC2, Doddanekundi, Marathahalli Bridge (Kalamandir), Kadubeesanahalli, Eco Space, Bellandur, Sarjapura Ring Road Junction, Agara Junction, HSR BDA Complex
5	EXP-500D	Central Silk Board	Manyata Tech Park, Tin Factory, KR Puram Railway Station, EMC2, Marathahalli Bridge (Kalamandir), Kadubeesanahalli, Ecospace, Sarjapur Ring Road Junction.
6	500E	Electronic City Wipro Gate	Kempapura, Manyata Tech Park, Nagawara Junction, Hennur Junction, Kalyan Nagar, Horamavu, Kasturi Nagar, Tin Factory, KR Pura Railway Station, Mahadevapura Ring Road, EMC2, Doddanekundi, Marathahalli Bridge (Kalamandir), Kadubeesanahalli, Eco Space, Bellandur, Sarjapura Ring Road Junction, Agara Junction, HSR BDA Complex, Central Silk Board, Bommanahalli, Kudlu Gate, Hosa Road Junction, Beratena Agrahara
7	500HK	Hoskote	Kempapura, Manyata Tech Park, Nagawara Junction, Hennur Junction, Kalyan Nagar, Horamavu, Kasturi Nagar, Tin Factory, ITI Gate, KR Puram, Subashnagar, Medahalli, Budigere Cross, Katamanallur Gate, Hoskote Toll Plaza
8	500HS	Sarjapura	Kempapura, Manyata Tech Park, Nagawara Junction, Hennur Junction, Kalyan Nagar, Horamavu, Kasturi Nagar, Tin Factory, KR Pura Railway Station, Mahadevapura Ring Road, EMC2, Doddanekundi, Marathahalli Bridge (Kalamandir), Kadubeesanahalli, Eco Space, Bellandur, Sarjapura Ring Road Junction, Bellandur Gate, Doddakannalli, Kodati Gate, Dommasandra, Sompura

=== KR Market Routes ===
Sl.No	Route Number	Terminus	Via
1	240M	Magadi	Kottigepalya, Sunkadakatte, Tavarekere, T.G.Halli, T.B.Gate
2	250SB	Acharya Institute of Technology	Corporation, Maharani College, Malleshwaram, Yeshwantpur, Goraguntepalya, Peenya, Jalahalli Cross, Hesaraghatta, Janapriya Apartment

=== Electronic City Routes ===
Sl.No	Route Number	Terminus	Via
1	378	Kengeri	Gottigere, Jambusavari Dinne, Konanakunte Cross, Uttarahalli
2	NICE-4	Vijayanagar	NICE Road, Nayandahalli Junction, Nagarabhavi Circle, Chandra Layout

=== BEL Circle Routes ===
Sl.No	Route Number	Terminus	Via
1	500BC	Central Silk Board	Kuvempu Circle, Hebbal, Kempapura, Manyata Tech Park, Nagawara Junction, Hennur Junction, Kalyan Nagar, Horamavu, Kasturi Nagar, Tin Factory, KR Pura Railway Station, Mahadevapura Ring Road, EMC2, Doddanekundi, Marathahalli Bridge (Kalamandir), Kadubeesanahalli, Eco Space, Bellandur, Sarjapura Ring Road Junction, Agara Junction, HSR BDA Complex
2	500QK	Kadugodi	Kuvempu Circle, Hebbal, Kempapura, Manyata Tech Park, Nagawara Junction, Hennur Junction, Kalyan Nagar, Horamavu, Kasturi Nagar, Tin Factory, KR Pura Railway Station, Mahadevapura, Garudacharpalya, Hoodi, ITPL, Hope Farm

=== Tin Factory Routes ===
Sl.No	Route Number	Terminus	Via
1	500L	Banashankari	KR Pura Railway Station, Mahadevapura Ring Road, EMC2, Doddanekundi, Marathahalli Bridge (Kalamandir), Kadubeesanahalli, Eco Space, Bellandur, Sarjapura Ring Road Junction, Agara Junction, HSR BDA Complex, Central Silk Board, BTM Layout, Jayadeva Hospital, Ragigudda Temple, Marenahalli, Sangam Circle
2	500N	Central Silk Board	KR Pura Railway Station, Mahadevapura Ring Road, EMC2, Doddanekundi, Marathahalli Bridge (Kalamandir), Kadubeesanahalli, Eco Space, Bellandur, Sarjapura Ring Road Junction, Agara Junction, HSR BDA Complex

== Vajra Vistara ==
Sl.No	Route Number	Origin	Terminus	Via
1	V-EXP-KNP-1A	Kanakapura	Electronic City Wipro Gate	Jain University, Dayananda Sagar College, Harohalli, Kaggalipura, Kanakapura Road NICE Toll Plaza, Bannerughatta Road NICE Toll Plaza,
2	V-EXP-CPT-1A	Channapatna	Electronic City Wipro Gate	Ramanagara, Bidadi, Kumbalagodu, Mysore Road NICE Toll Plaza, Kanakapura Road NICE Toll Plaza, Bannerughatta Road NICE Toll Plaza,
3	V-EXP-TMK-1A	Tumkur	Electronic City Wipro Gate	Nelamangala Bypass, Madavara, Mysore Road NICE Toll Plaza, Kanakapura Road NICE Toll Plaza, Bannerughatta Road NICE Toll Plaza,
4	V-EXP-TMK-1	Tumkur	Kempegowda Bus Station (Majestic)	Navarang Theatre, Govardhan Talkies, Goraguntepalya, Widia Factory, Nelmangala Toll Plaza, Kyathsandra
5	V-EXP-KNP-1	Kanakapura	Banashankari	Jain University, Dayananda Sagar College, Harohalli, Kaggalipura, Silk Institute, Thalaghattapura, Konanakunte Cross, Jaya Prakash Nagar
6	V-EXP-RMN-1	Ramanagara	Kempegowda Bus Station (Majestic)	NICE Road Junction, Kengeri, Rajarajeshwari Nagar, Nayandahalli Junction, Mysuru Road Bus Station
7	V-EXP-KGL-1	Kunigal	Kempegowda Bus Station (Majestic)	Maluru HP, Soluru, Goraguntepalya, Nelamangala Toll,Widia Factory,Goraguntepalya,Govardhan Talkies,Navrang

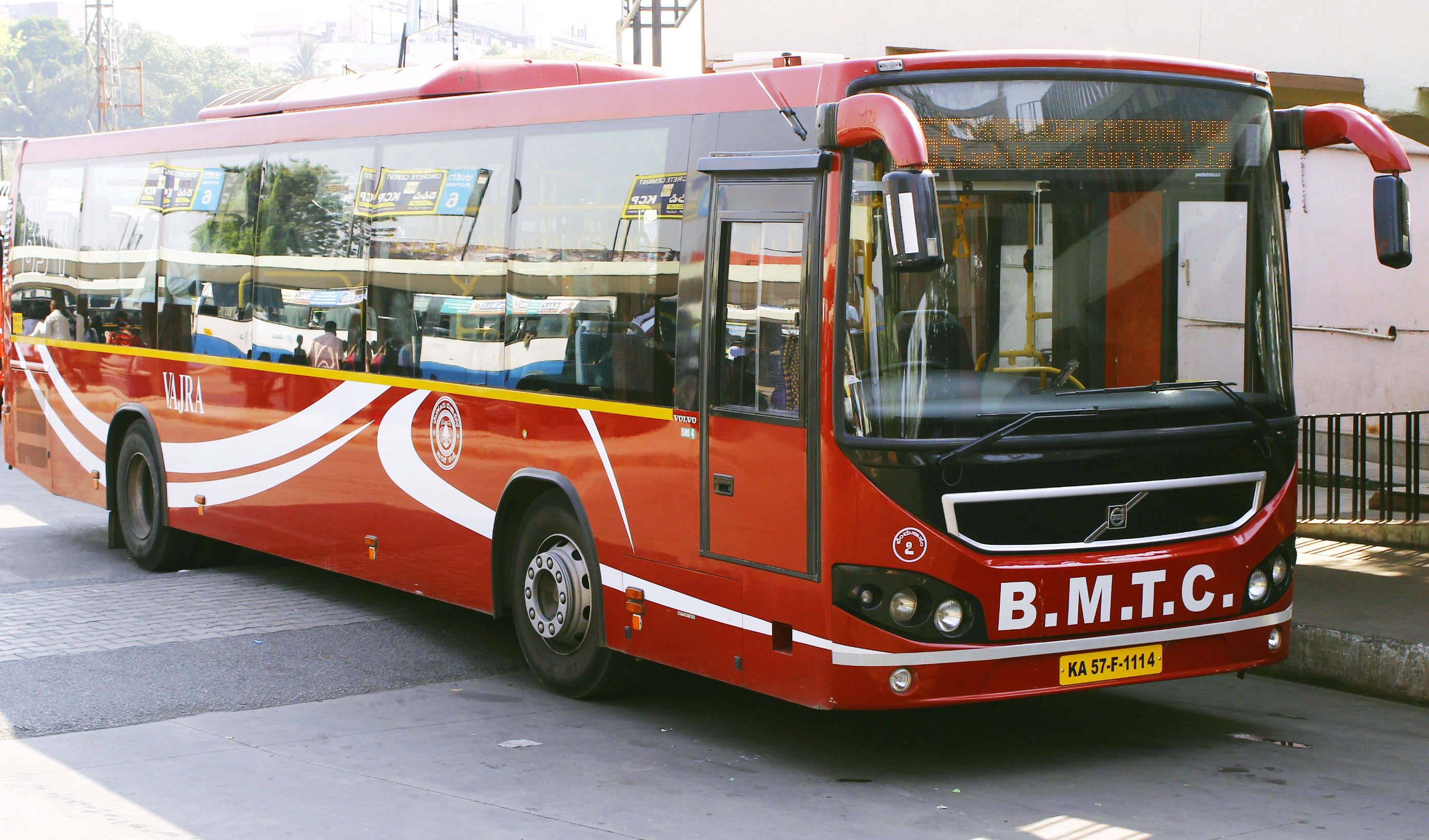
Old Vajra bus plying on 365 Route towards Bannerghatta National Park

Interior of Electric Vajra Busplying on V-365 Route standing in Kempegowda Bus Station

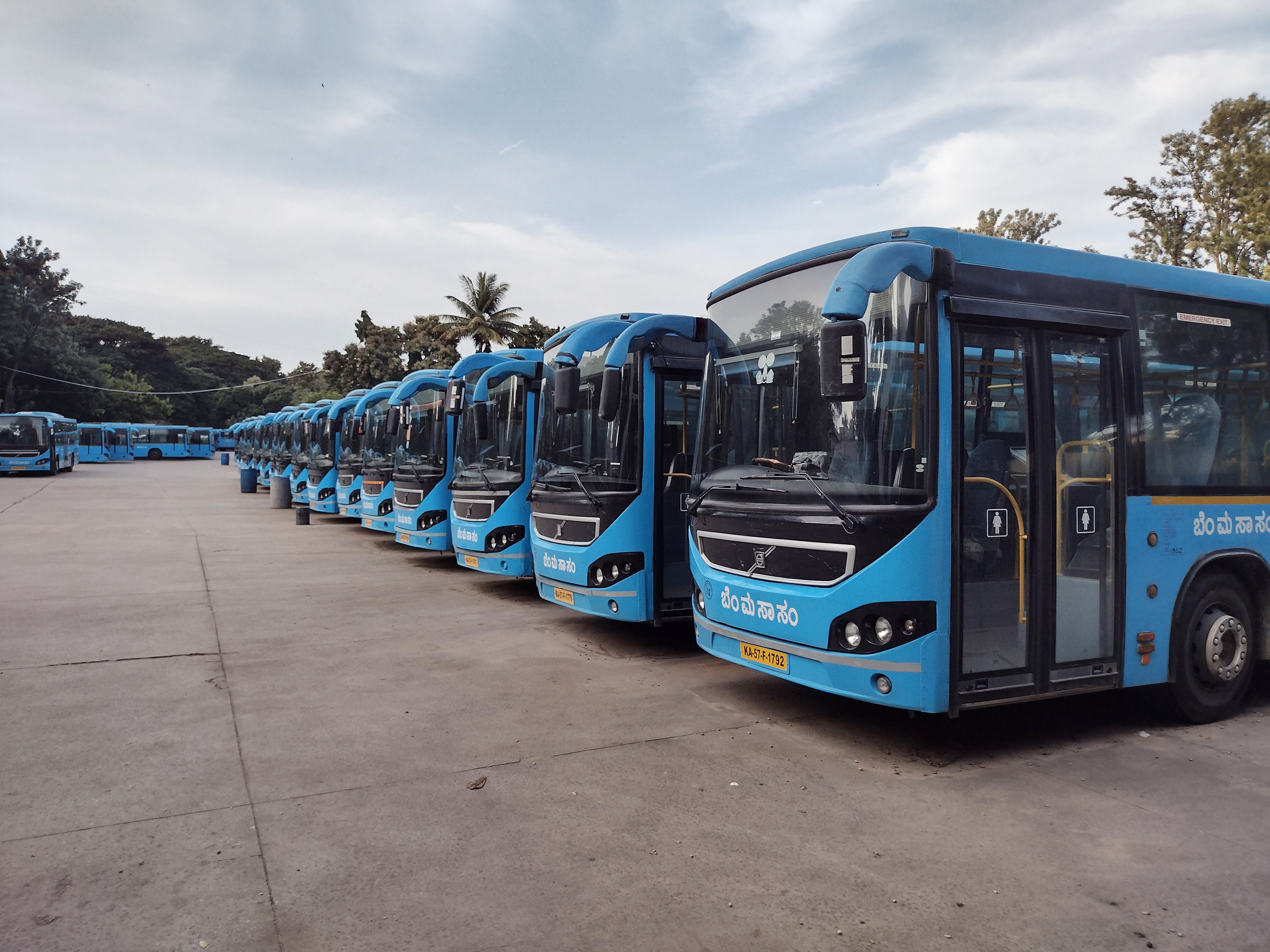
Vajra buses in bus depot 13, Kamakya, Bengaluru

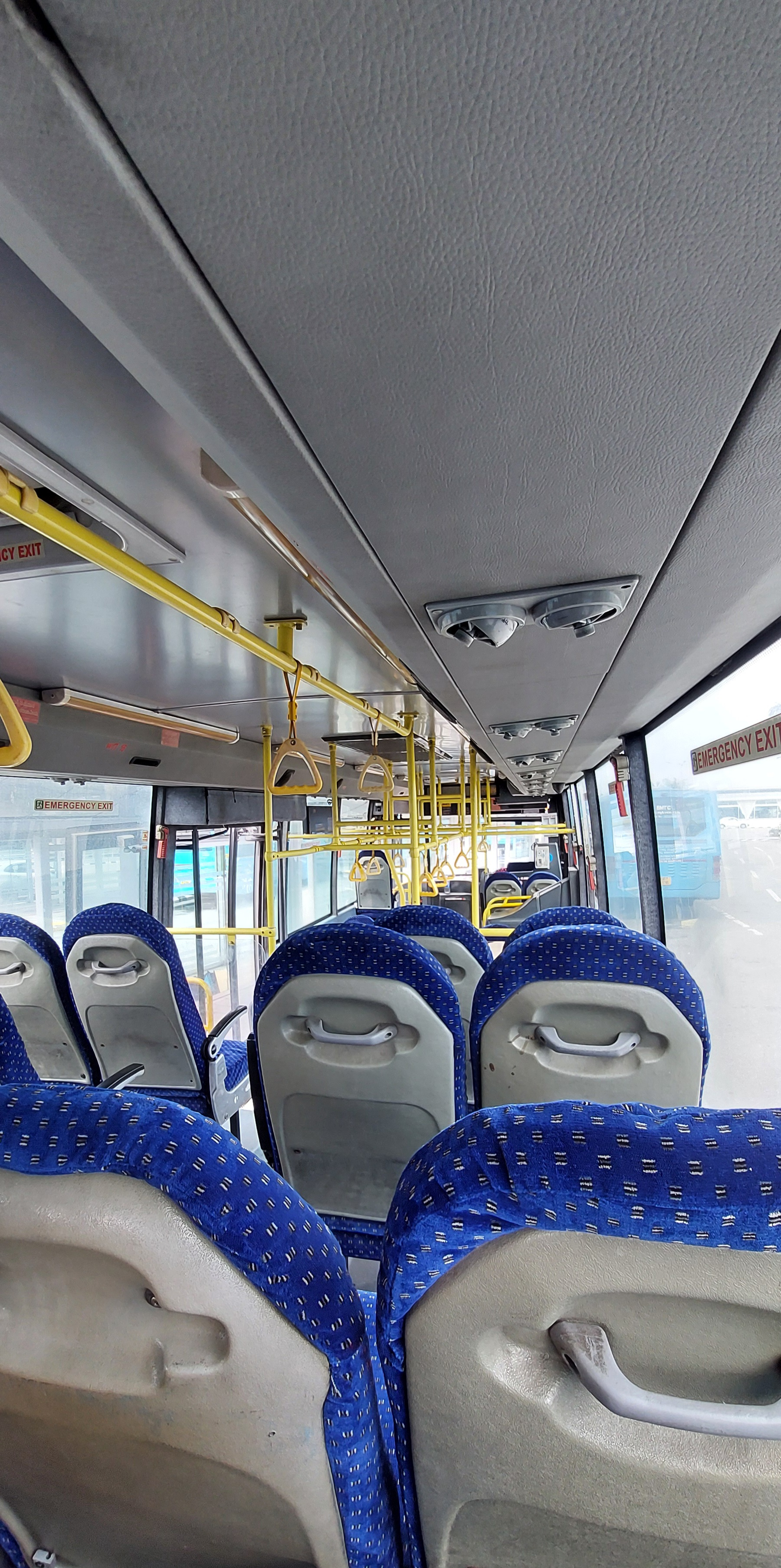
Interior of a Volvo Vajra bus

== See also ==
- Vayu Vajra
- Vajra Vistara
