= Kumara Swamy Devasthana, Bengaluru =

Hindu Temple

Coordinates: 12.940467°N 77.562578°E

Kumara Swamy Devasthana
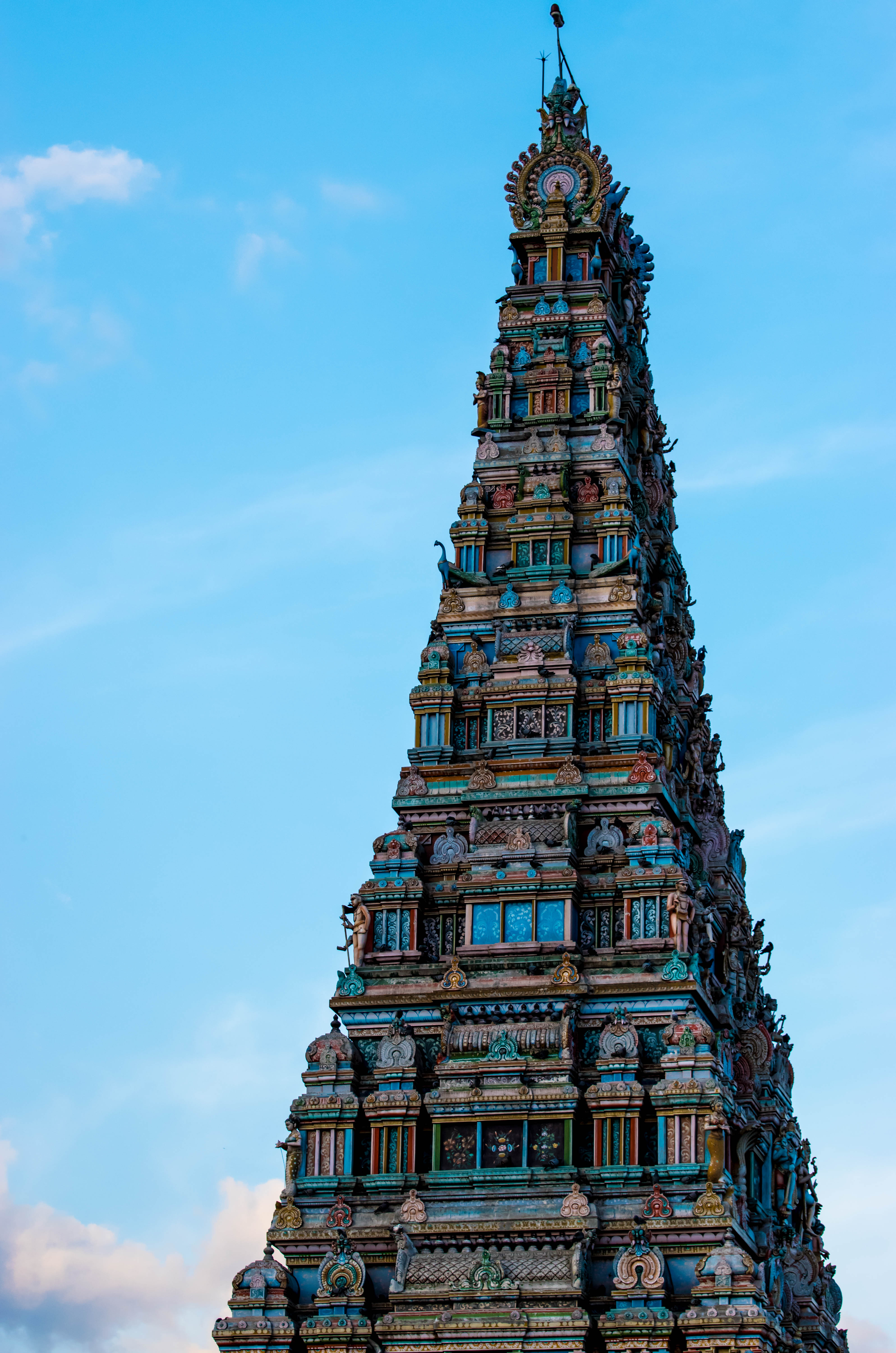

Religion
- Affiliation: Hinduism
- District: Bangalore
- Deity: Lord Kumara Swamy

Location
- Location: Bangalore
- State: Karnataka
- Country: India
- Interactive map of Kumara Swamy Devasthana

Kumara Swamy Devasthana (Kannada: ಶ್ರೀ ಕುಮಾರಸ್ವಾಮಿ ದೇವಸ್ಥಾನ, romanized: Śrī kumārasvāmi dēvasthāna), also known as Sri Kumaraswaami Temple, is a Hindu temple located in Hanumanthanagar, in the city of Bangalore, Karnataka, southern India. It is dedicated to the god Kartikeya, also known as Subrahmanya, Kumara Swamy, or Murugan.

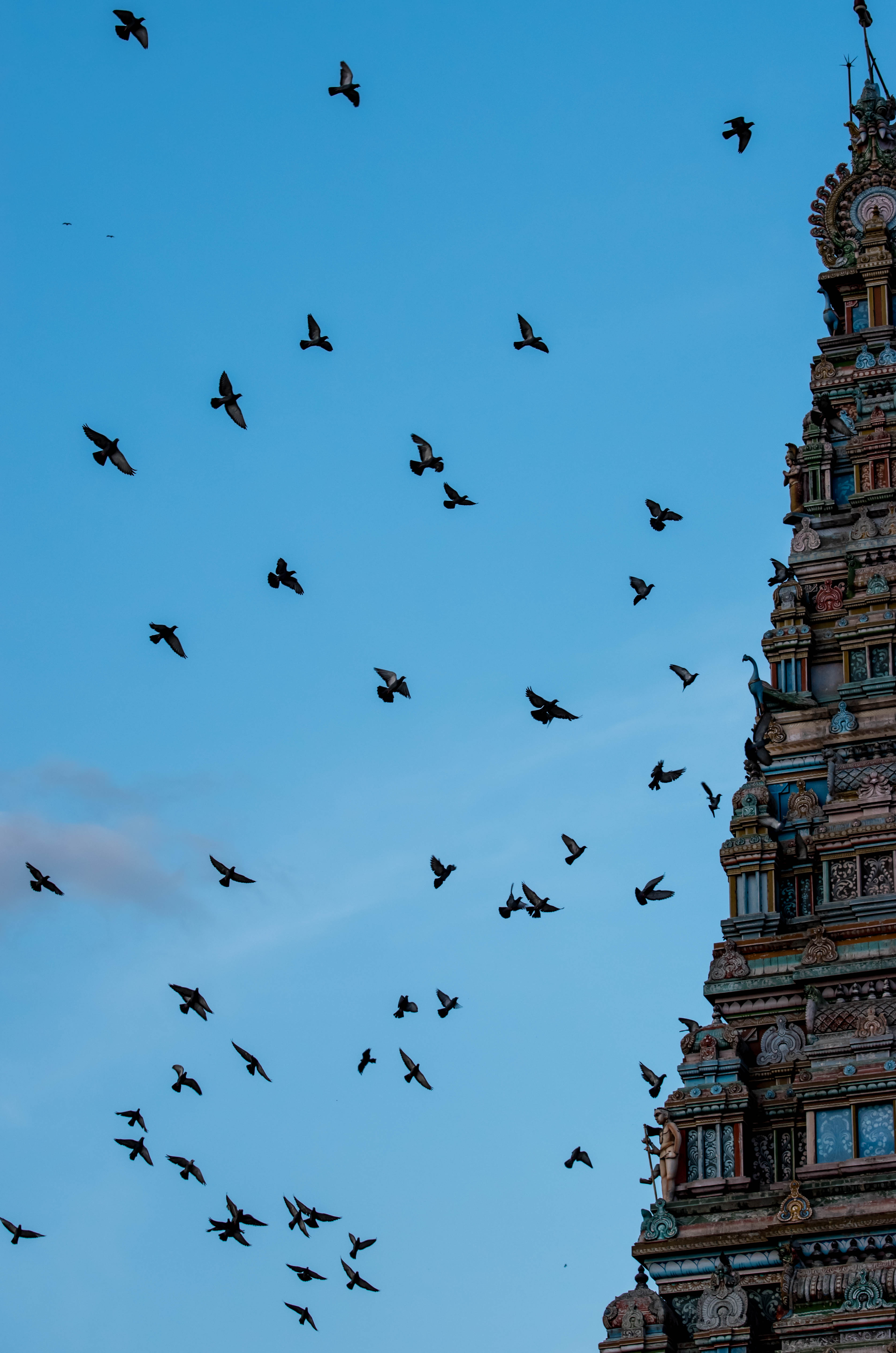
The Gopuram at Kumara Swamy Temple

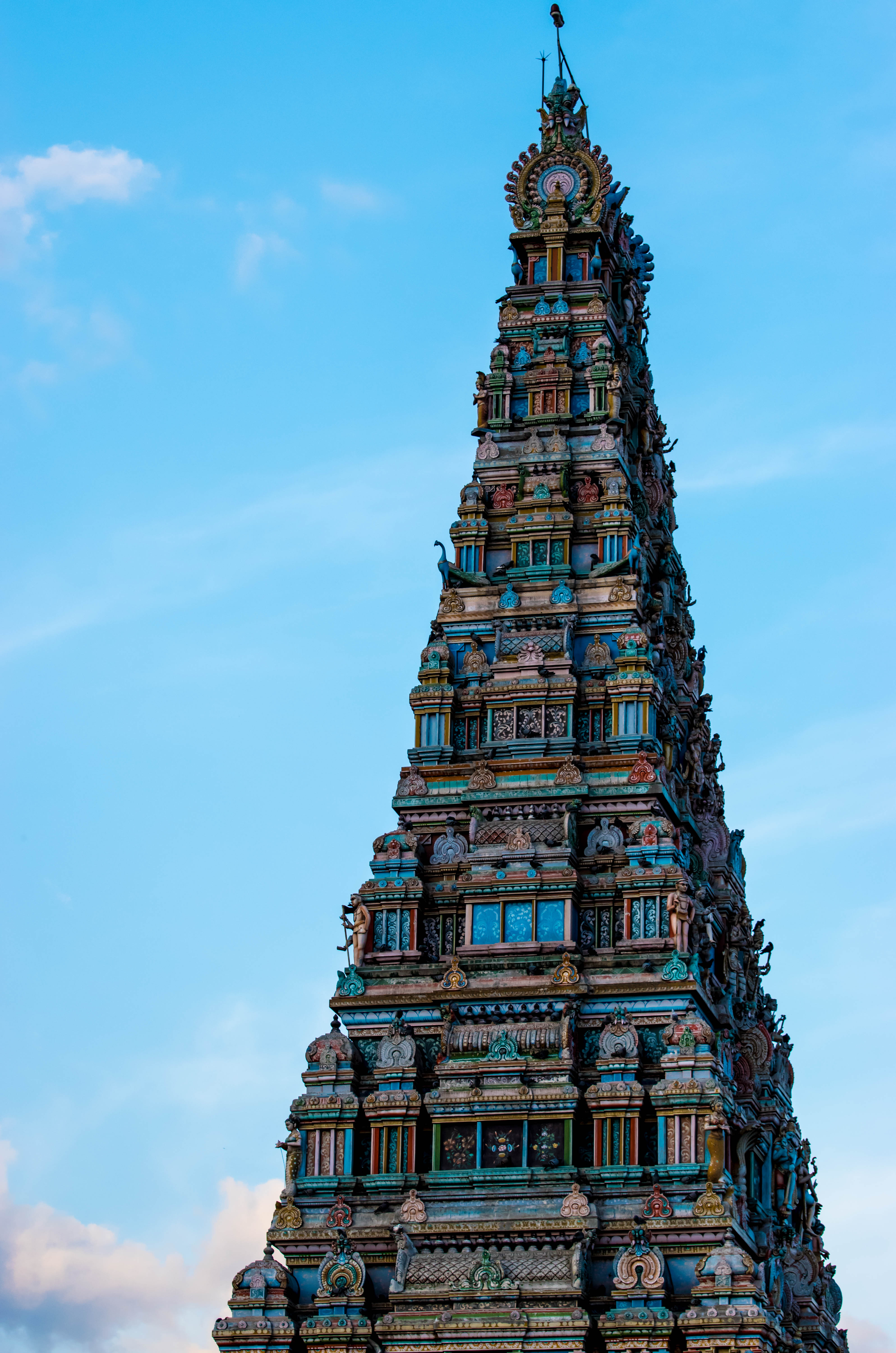
Long Standing Gopuram at Kumara Swamy temple, Bangalore, India

== The temple ==
The temple is located on top of a hill, known as Mount Joy, with walkways and stairs leading to the summit. Special prayers are performed during "Subbaraya (Subramanya) Shasti". Adjoining the statue of Kumara Swamy, are the sacred Shiva Lingam, Ganesha in a seated posture and Parvati. Also have been consecrated, the Navagraha are in a separate shrine adjoining this shrine within the same hall. The Gopuram at the entrance preceding a huge open hall, preceding the hall enshrining the Main Shrine that is sculpted with the image of Murugan's role as a guru to Shiva. This is identical to that of the Swaminatha Swamy Temple in Thanjavur in Tamil Nadu.

Originally the sanctum sanctorum had a panchaloha idol, and the granite idol presently displayed and worshipped is of much later origin. This original panchaloha idol is now seen enshrined separately in the Hall preceding the hall enshrining the sanctum sanctorum.

=== Pancha-Mukhi Ganesha temple ===
At the foot of the hill is Pancha-Mukhi Ganesha temple. This modern temple has an idol of Ganesha with five heads, hence the name Pancha-Mukhi Ganesha. His vahana there is different and away from the usual representation of Ganesha. There, his vahana is of a lion.

Special poojas (prayers) are performed on Sankastha Chaturdasi, and the temple is crowded on this day.

The worship of Lord Ganesha is done according to the ancient Ganapatya method. This temple is one of the few in Bangalore to follow this method of worship. On the opposite side of the temple, the sanctum for Navaraghas are located and adjoining them is a representation of Anjaneya (Hanuman), blessing the devotees.

=== Other features ===
Midway between the foothill and the apex is the shrine dedicated to Shesha, a serpent demigod who serves Narayana and Mahavishnu, both incarnations of Vishnu.

Next to the Kumara Swamy temple, there is another small granite hill. Atop this, there is a large water tank built by the Bangalore Water Supply and Sewerage Board. It supplies potable water to the adjoining areas. On a clear day, wide views of Bangalore are available from the top of the hill.
