= Banashankari metro station =

Namma Metro's Green Line metro station

Banashankari
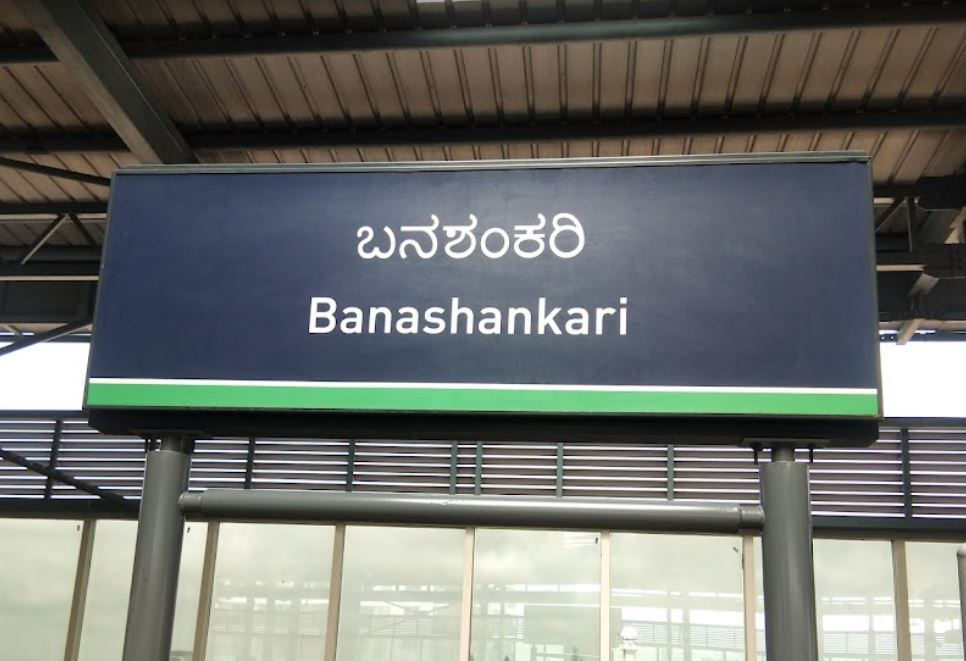

General information
- Other names: Banashankari Temple, Banashankari TTMC, Banashankari Bus Station
- Location: Kanakapura Rd, Sarbandapalya, JP Nagar, Bengaluru, Karnataka 560078
- Coordinates: 12.915649°N 77.573631°E
- System: Namma Metro station
- Owner: Bangalore Metro Rail Corporation Ltd (BMRCL)
- Operator: Namma Metro
- Line: Green Line
- Platforms: Side platform Platform-1 → Madavara; Platform-2 → Silk Institute
- Tracks: 2
- Connections: Banashankari TTMC

Construction
- Structure type: Elevated, Double track
- Platform levels: 2
- Accessible: Yes
- Architect: JMC Projects

Other information
- Status: Staffed
- Station code: BSNK

History
- Opened: 18 June 2017; 9 years ago
- Electrified: 750 V DC third rail

Services
Preceding station	Namma Metro	Following station
Rashtreeya Vidyalaya Road towards Madavara	Green Line	Jaya Prakash Nagar towards Silk Institute
Route map
Location

Banashankari is an elevated metro station on the north–south corridor of the Green Line of Namma Metro serving the Sarbandapalya area of Bengaluru, India. It was opened to the public on 18 June 2017.

== Station layout ==
G	Street level	Exit/Entrance
L1	Mezzanine	Fare control, station agent, Metro Card vending machines, crossover
L2	Side platform | Doors will open on the left
L2	Platform 2 Southbound	Towards → Silk Institute; Next Station: Jaya Prakash Nagar; Change at the next station for Orange Line **
L2	Platform 1 Northbound	Towards ← Madavara; Next Station: Rashtreeya Vidyalaya Road; Change at the next station for Yellow Line
L2	Side platform | Doors will open on the left
L2

== Gallery ==
Banashankari metro station:-

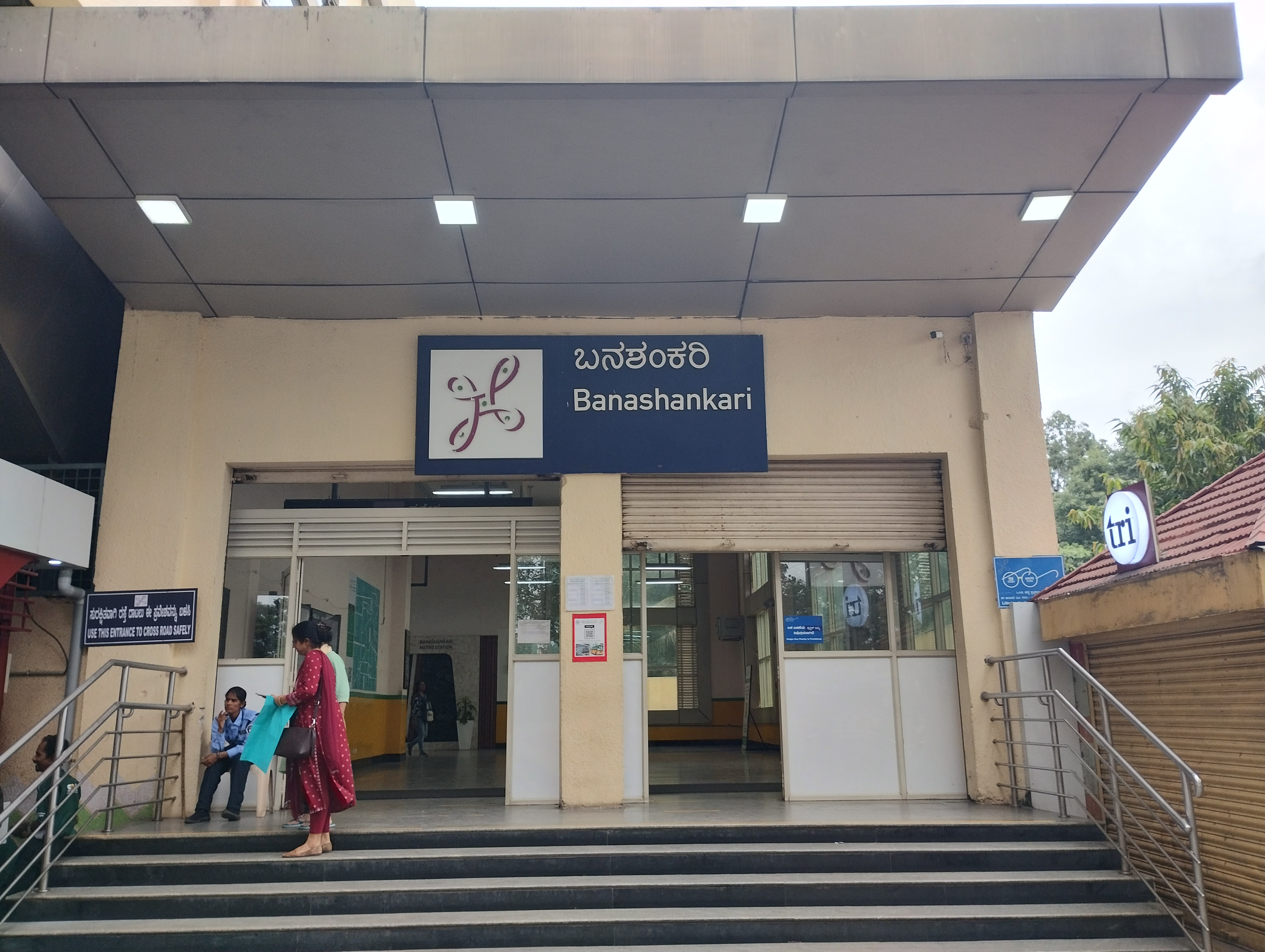
Entrance of the station

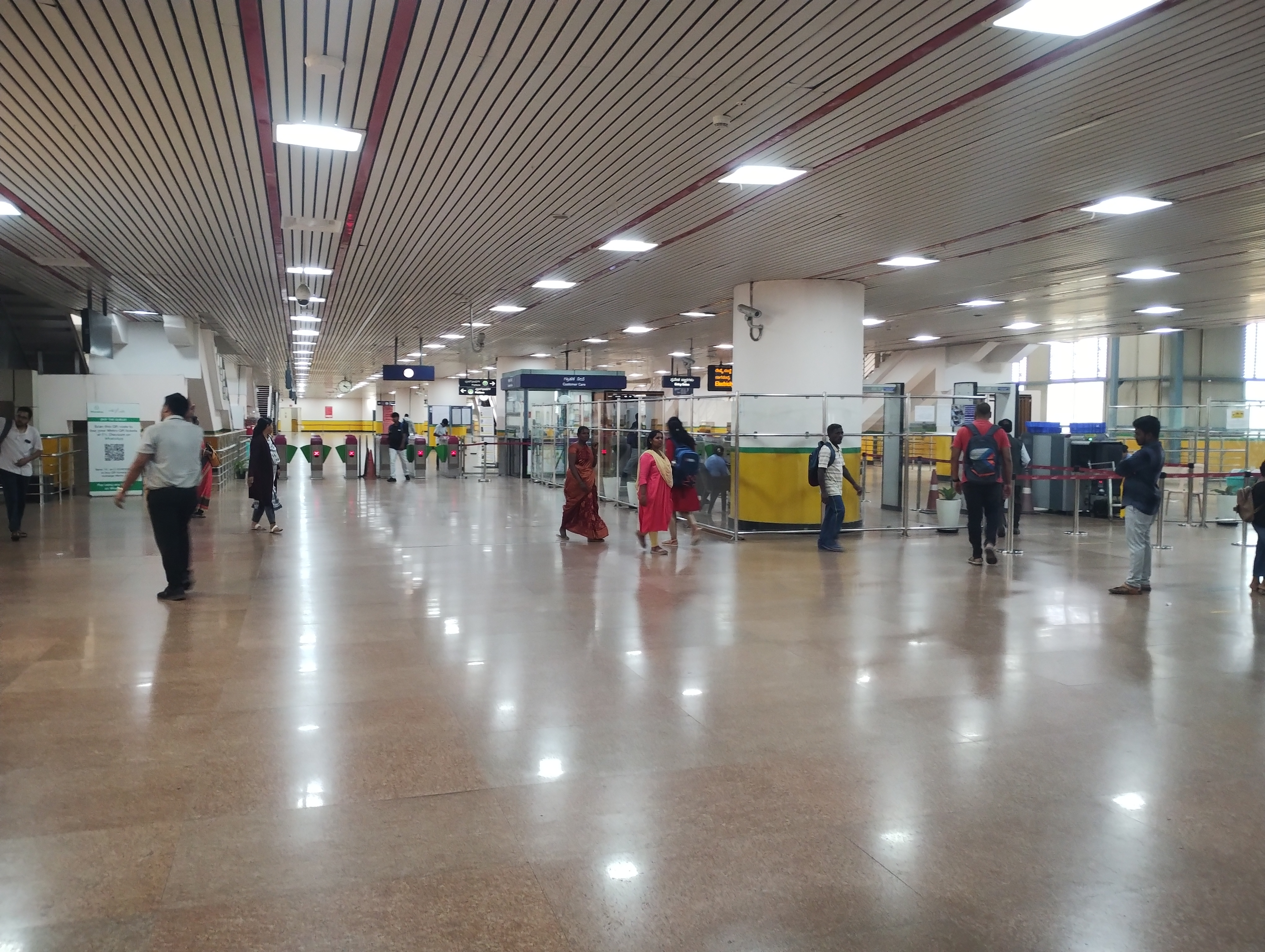
Interiors of the station

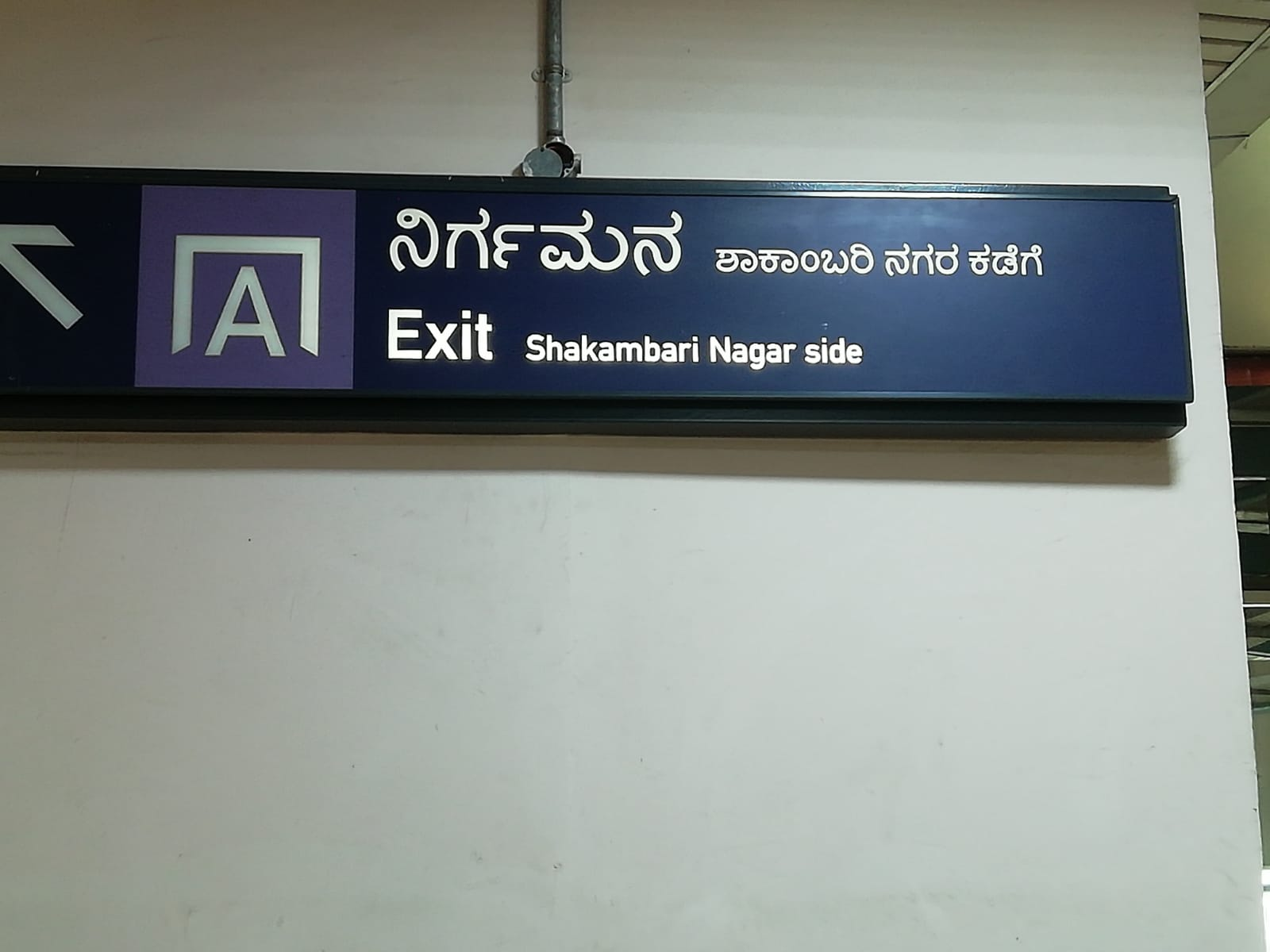
Exit Gate A towards the Shakambari Nagar Side

== Connections ==
The station is also connected to the BMTC's Banashankari bus stand and the Sri Banashankari Amma Temple.

== Entry/Exits ==
There are 3 Entry/Exit points – A, B and C. Commuters can use either of the points for their travel.

- Entry/Exit point A: Towards Shakambari Nagar side
- Entry/Exit point B: Towards Shakambari Nagar side
- Entry/Exit point C: Towards Taluk side
- Entry/Exit point D: Towards Banashankari Temple side with

== See also ==
- Bengaluru
- List of Namma Metro stations
- Transport in Karnataka
- List of metro systems
- List of rapid transit systems in India
