= Wilson Garden =

- neighbourhood
- Interactive map of Wilson Garden
- Country: India
- State: Karnataka
- Metro: Bangalore

Languages
  - Official: Kannada
- Time zone: UTC+5:30 (IST)
- PIN: 560027

Wilson Garden is a densly populated neighbourhood in the central part of Bengaluru, India. It has an electric crematorium.
