= State Highway 17 (Karnataka) =

State Highway in Karnataka, India

State Highway 17
- Mysore Road, Bangalore Road, BM Road
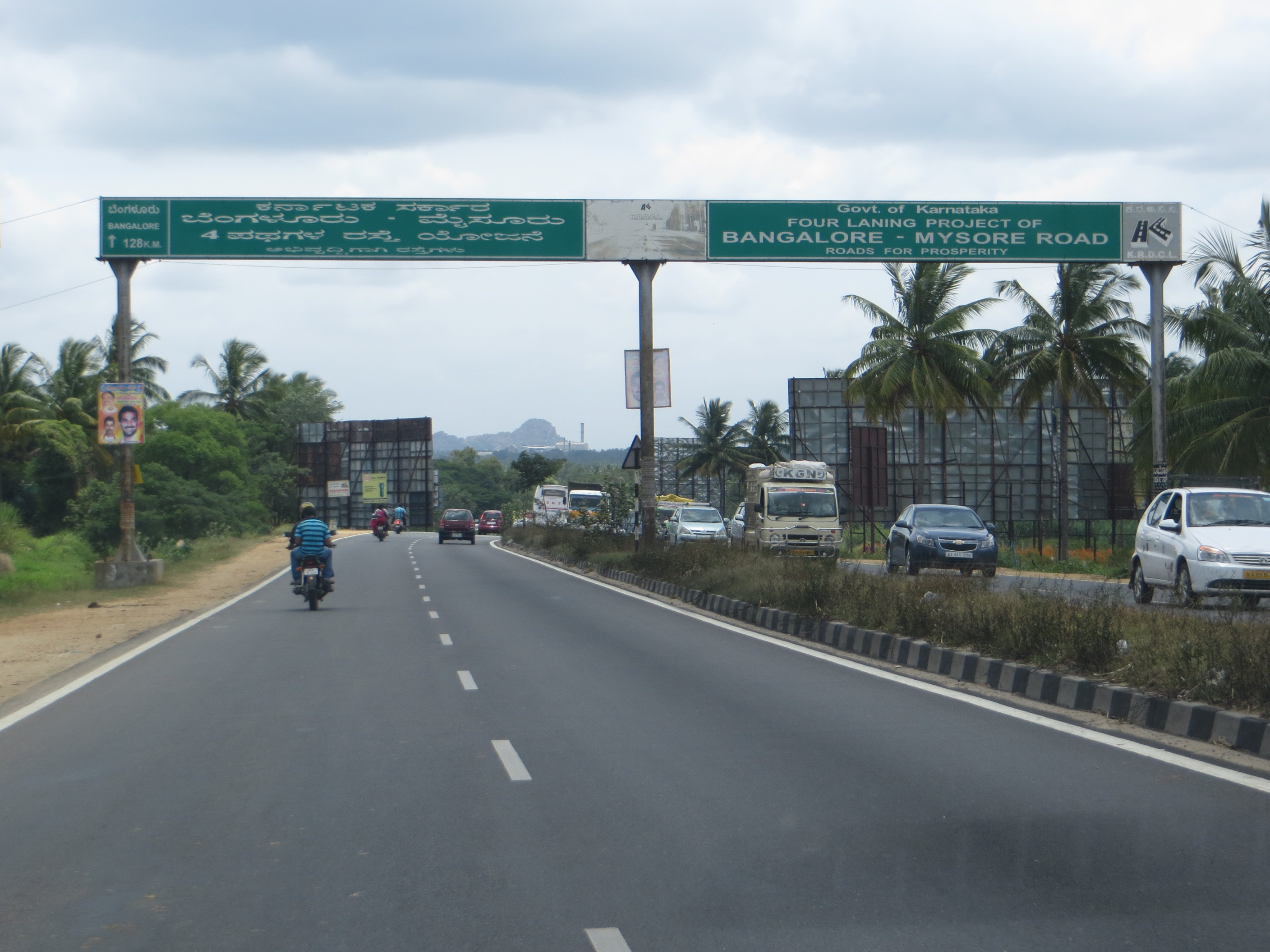

Route information
- Maintained by Karnataka Road Development Corporation Limited, Karnataka Public Works Department
- Length: 149 km (93 mi)

Major junctions
- North end: Bangalore, Karnataka
- South end: Mysore, Karnataka

Location
- Country: India
- State: Karnataka
- Districts: Bangalore Urban, Ramanagara, Mandya, Mysore
- Primary destinations: Ramanagara, Channapatna, Mandya

Highway system
- Roads in India; Expressways; National; State; Asian; State Highways in Karnataka

State Highway 17 (SH-17) is a state highway connecting the cities of Bangalore and Mysore in the south Indian state of Karnataka. The 149 kilometres (93 mi) highway has been built and maintained by the Karnataka Road Development Corporation Limited and inaugurated in 2003. The highway passes through the towns of Ramanagara, Channapatna, Maddur, Mandya and Srirangapatna (Seringapattinam), before entering Mysore. The road is dual carriageway and passes over the Kaveri river. The 15 km stretch from Bangalore Central to Kengeri NICE Road Junction is known as Mysore Road.

The 62 kilometres (39 mi) Bangalore-Maddur section was upgraded under build-operate-transfer (Annuity) basis by a consortium of NCC Infra and Maytas Infra. The 49 kilometres (30 mi) Maddur-Mysore stretch was upgraded by Soma under an EPC contract.

Bengaluru-Mysore highway was taken over by the NHAI in 2014 and included as a part of the Bengaluru-Bantwal NH-275. The stretch was upgraded to a 6-lane partially access-controlled highway along with 2-lane service roads on either sides in March 2023.

== See also ==
- List of state highways in Karnataka
- NICE Road
- Outer Ring Road, Bangalore
- Mysore Ring Road
