= Bejai bus stand =

Major bus station in Mangaluru, India

Bejai Bus Station Bejai Raste Bas Nildāṇa
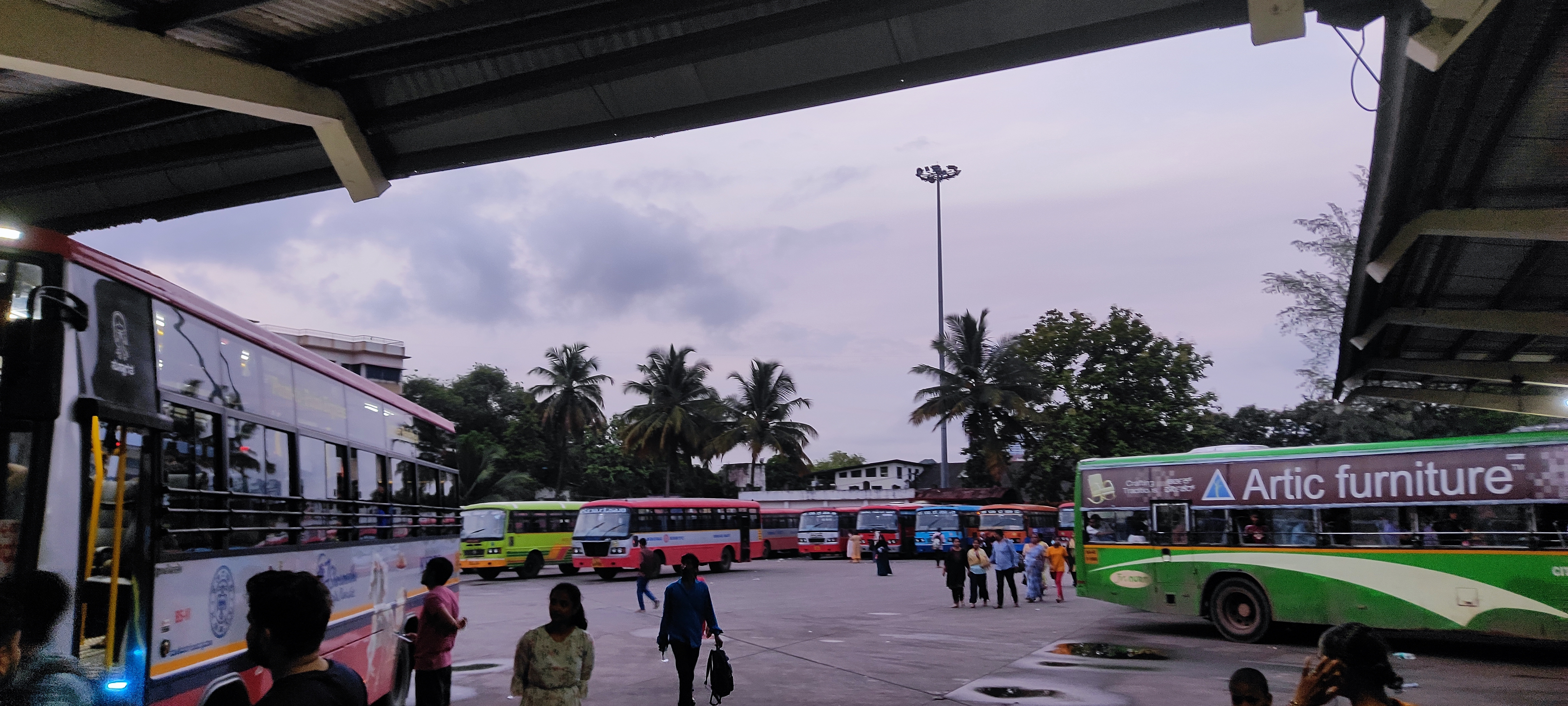
- Mangalore KSRTC Bus Stand Karnataka KSRTC's one Ashwamedha Classic Class, Karnataka Sarige, Gramantara Sarige buses parked side by side.

General information
- Other names: Mangaluru Bus Station; Mangalore bus stand
- Location: Bejai, Mangaluru; Karnataka-575004; India
- Coordinates: 12.88525°N 74.84169°E
- System: Karnataka KSRTC, Kerala KSRTC; K-SWIFT, Kadamba Transport Corporation Bus Station
- Owner: Karnataka KSRTC
- Operator: KSRTC
- Platforms: 1
- Bus routes: Karnataka; Tamil Nadu; Kerala; Goa; Telangana; Andhra Pradesh
- Bus operators: Karnataka State Road Transport Corporation; North Western Karnataka Road Transport Corporation; Kalyana Karnataka Road Transport Corporation; Kerala State Road Transport Corporation; KSRTC SWIFT; Tamil Nadu State Transport Corporation; State Express Transport Corporation

Construction
- Structure type: At-grade
- Parking: Available
- Accessible: Yes

Other information
- Station code: 575004
Location

Bejai Bus Stand is a key bus station hub located on Bejai Main Road in the Bejai area of Mangaluru, INdia. It's operated by the Karnataka State Road Transport Corporation (KSRTC) and operates 24 hours a day, serving both local and long-distance bus passengers. It is the second busiest bus stand in Mangalore after state bank bus stand which is dominated by private operators such as DKBOA.This bus stand is operated for only government buses like KSRTC.

== Location and connectivity ==
It is a hub for Karnataka State Road Transport Corporation,NWKRTC,KKRTC buses heading to major cities such as Bengaluru,Kasargod,Mysore, Goa, Hubli-Dharwad and Mumbai,Laxmeshwar. It also receives buses from neighbouring states like Kerala, Tamil Nadu and Goa.

Karnataka State Road Transport Corporation (KSRTC) runs long-distance bus services from Mangalore to other parts of the state. The Mangaluru-Bengaluru route is the most lucrative route. The longest bus route served by KSRTC is the Mangaluru - Ankola- Hubli- Belgaum- Pune- Mumbai served by Airavat Club Class..The journey takes about 19-20 hours by Volvo Buses.

Frequent departures make it a common boarding point for travelers heading out of Mangaluru by bus.

== Division and depot ==
It is the headquarters of KSRTC Mangalore division which operates coastal districts of Dakshina Kannada(Except Puttur division which in Dakshina Kannada district.) and Udupi.This bus stand hosts Depot-1 of KSRTC-Mangaluru division.This depot has many luxury buses like Rajahamsa Executive Class,Pallakki Class Ambaari Utsav Class,dream class,Airavat Club Class,Airavat club class 2.0.

== Proposed new bus stand ==
There was a proposal in 2016 to shift Bejai bus stand to Pumpwell for operating outstation bus. There is lot of congestion near this bus stand which has grown demand for new bus stand.

== Demand for Tulu language in sign board ==
In July 2026, there was demand from activists for inclusion of Tulu script on the sign board at Bejai bus stand. At that time, the sign was in English and Kannada.

== Gallery ==
Buses in Bus stand

NWKRTC Bus in bus stand

Ambaari Utsav Class coming from Bangalore going towards Kundapura parked in Bejai bus stand

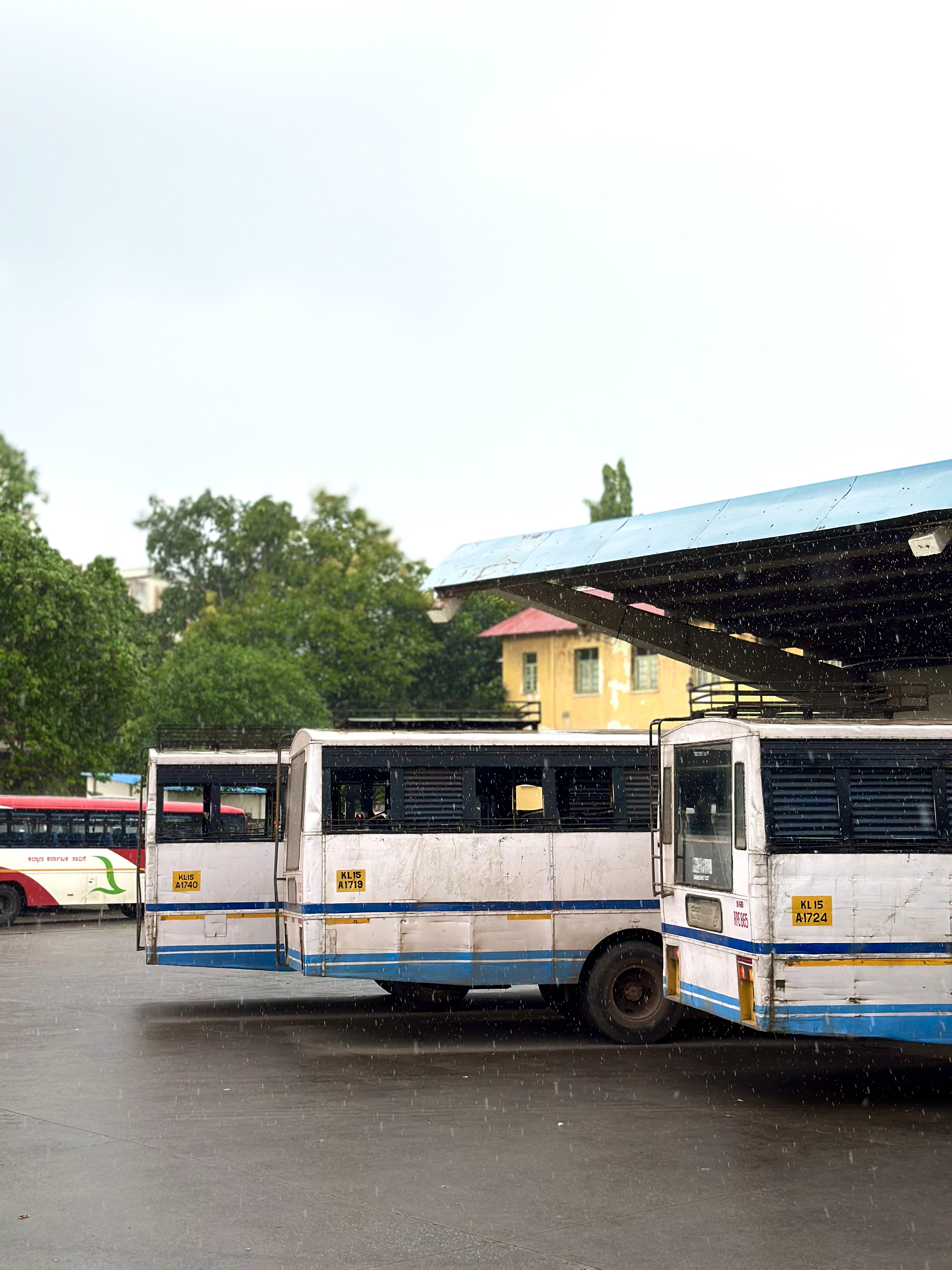
Four Kerala KSRTC alongside BS VI KKRTC Buses parked

== See also ==
- State Bank
