= Ashwamedha Classic Class =

Public bus service in India

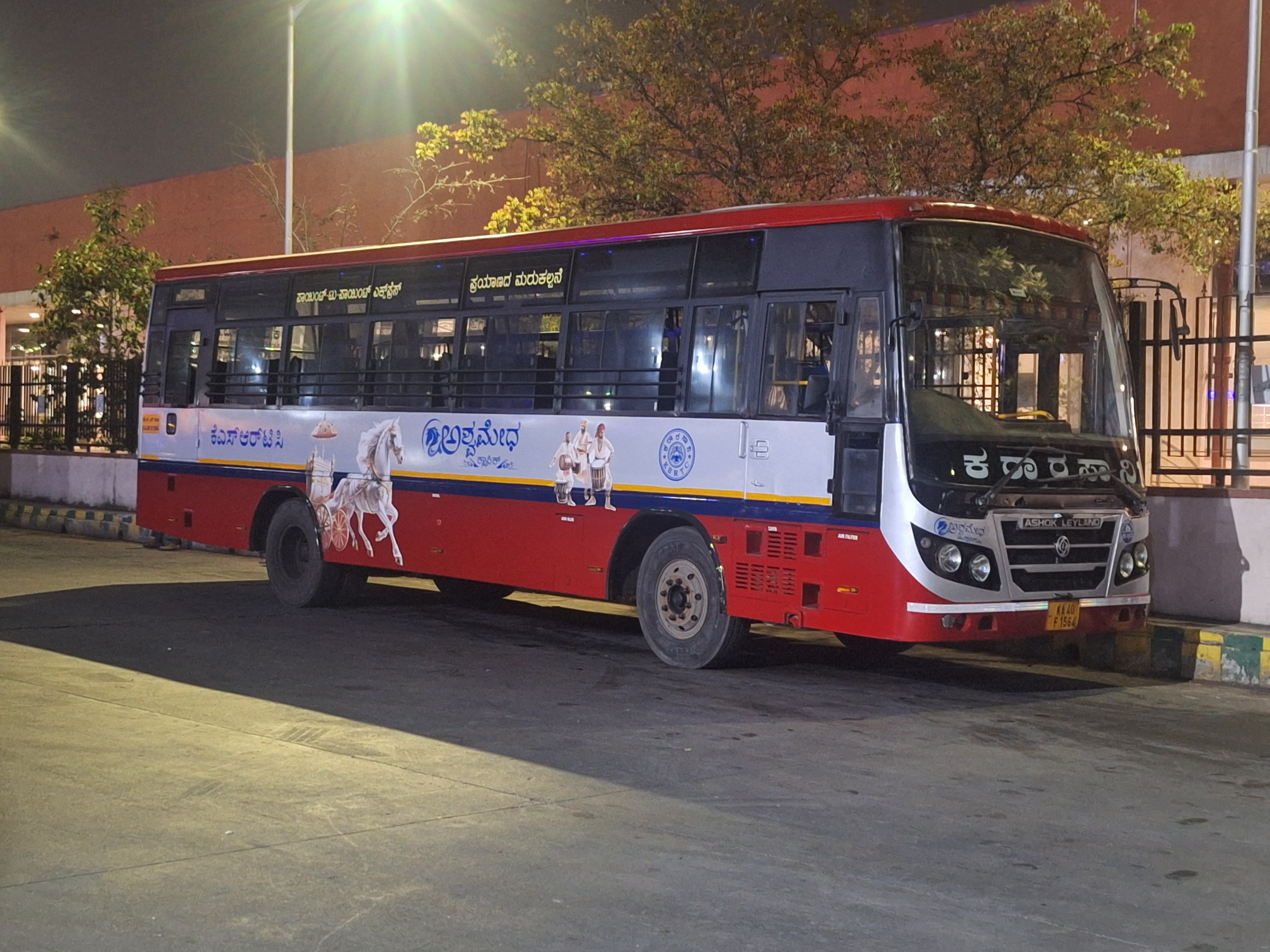
- Ashwamedha Classic bus at Kempegowda bus stand Terminal 2-A
- Parent: Karnataka State Road Transport Corporation
- Founded: 5 February 2024
- Locale: Dakshina Karnataka (Southern Karnataka)
- Service area: Dakshina Karnataka (Southern Karnataka)
- Service type: Non-AC Point-to-Point Inter-city and Inter-State services with Ashok Leyland chassis
- Operator: Karnataka State Road Transport Corporation (under Government of Karnataka)
- Website: ksrtc.karnataka.gov.in/en

Ashwamedha Classic Class or Kempu bus (red bus in Kannada), is a series of economic. point-to-point BS-VI Non-AC bus services operated by KSRTC across villages and districts of Karnataka. It consists of 3+2 seat layout with non-reclinable seats with more comfort than Karnataka Sarige, built on bi-axle Ashok Leyland suburban chassis with a durangi livery of two colours, silver and red. It is an interdistrict, interstate point-to-point service in Dakshina Karnataka (Southern Karnataka). It was launched on 5 February 2024 in the presence of then Chief Minister of Karnataka,Siddaramaiah and Transport Minister Ramalinga Reddy.

== Welfares and Schemes ==
=== 'Shakti Scheme' free bus service for women ===
'Shakti Scheme' was announced by the Second Siddaramaiah ministry on 2 June 2023. It started on 11 June 2023, providing free-of-charge bus service to Karnataka-domiciled women. Beneficiaries show their government-issued photo identity and address proof for the first three months. Bus conductors issue them zero-fare tickets. Thereafter, beneficiaries obtain Shakti smartcards (named after the name of the scheme) through an application submitted via the government's Seva Sindhu website.

==== Terms and conditions of the scheme ====
- The scheme will apply to all four Road Transport Corporations in the state (KSRTC, BMTC, NWKRTC and KKRTC).
- Ashwamedha Classic Class services is part of the scheme.
- Women can travel for free only on bus services within the state. Bus services to destinations outside Karnataka will be outside the scheme's purview even if women travel within the state. For example, a woman travelling to Mangaluru in Karnataka i.e., within the state on an Udupi-Kasaragod bus service which is an interstate service to Kasaragod in neighbouring Kerala, will have to buy a ticket.
- The scheme will not apply to luxury buses (Rajahamsa Executive Class, Airavat Class, Airavat Club Class, Pallakki Class, Ambaari Class, Ambaari Dream Class, Ambaari Utsav Class, Flybus, EV- Power Plus+services).
- Half of the seats on KSRTC ordinary and express buses will be reserved for men. Luxury, AC and interstate buses as well as BMTC buses will be exempted from this.

=== Free Bus passes for Students ===
In June 2026 Karnataka government under the chief ministry of D.K. Shivakumar announced free buses for students studying in karnataka from primary school to postgraduate level and border areas within 20 km of karnataka border.It is free for both boys and girls.

- Nagara Sarige, Gramantara Sarige, Karnataka Sarige,Ashwamedha Classic Class,Samparka is part of this Scheme.
- The government will reimburse the KSRTC based on the distance women travel.

== Gallery ==
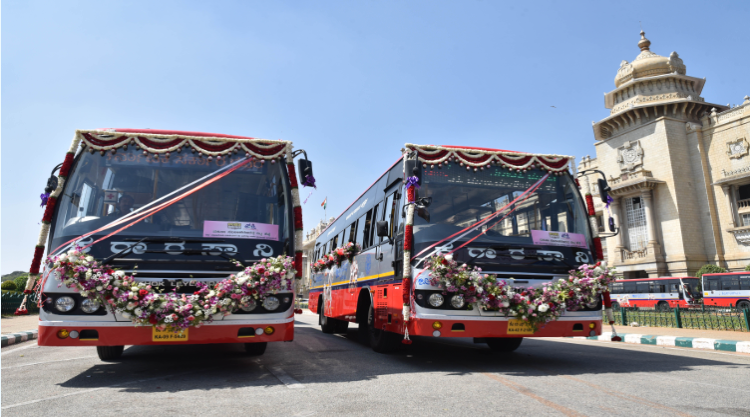
Ashwamedha Classic bus on its inauguration day in Vidhana Soudha

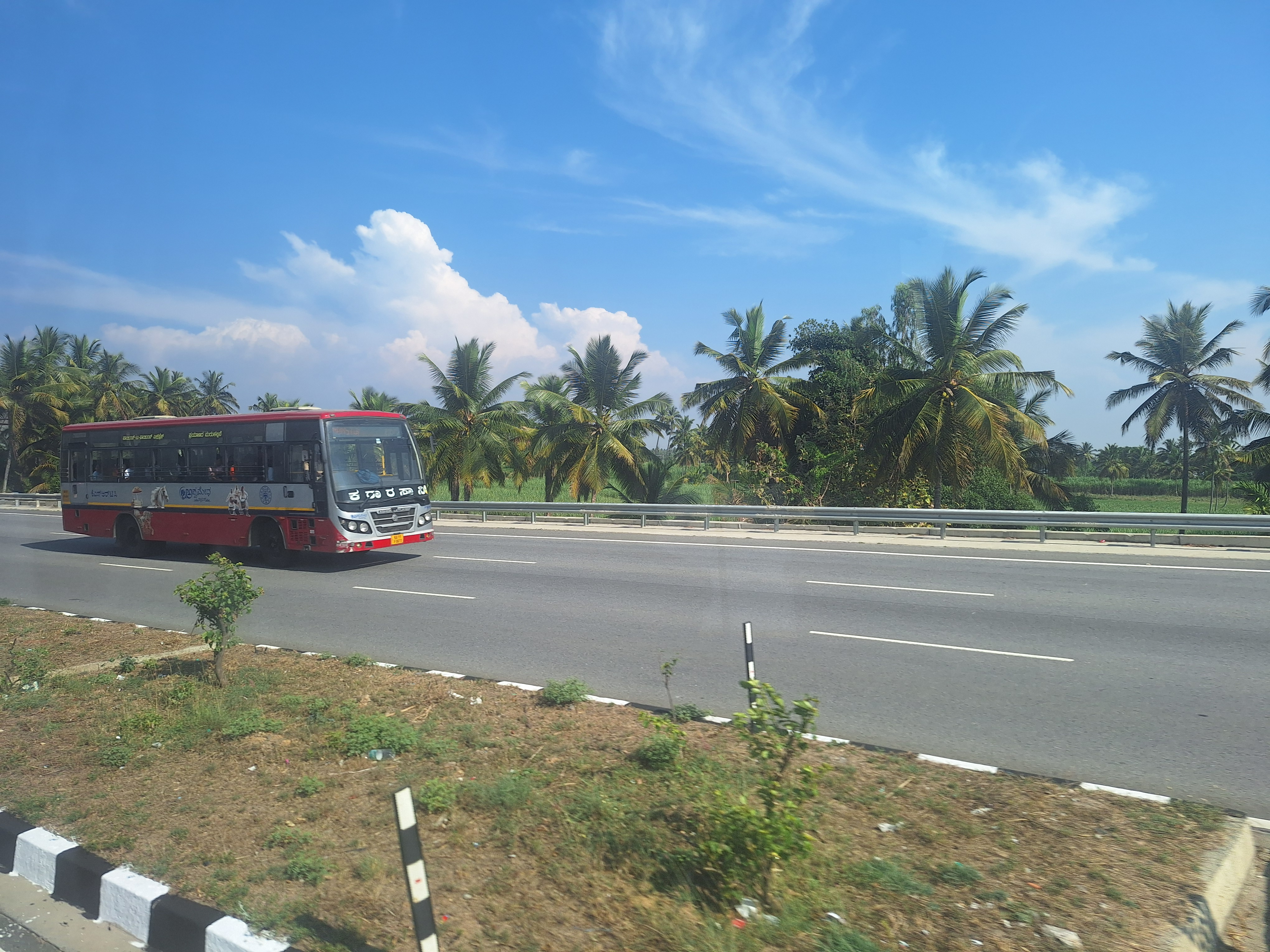
Karnataka Sarigebus in Bangalore-Mysuru Expressway

== See also ==
- Karnataka Sarige
- Nagara Sarige
- Rajahamsa Executive Class
