= Mysuru Sub Urban Bus Station =

Major bus station in Mysuru, India

Mysuru Sub Urban Bus Station Mysuru Grama Raste Bas Nildāṇa
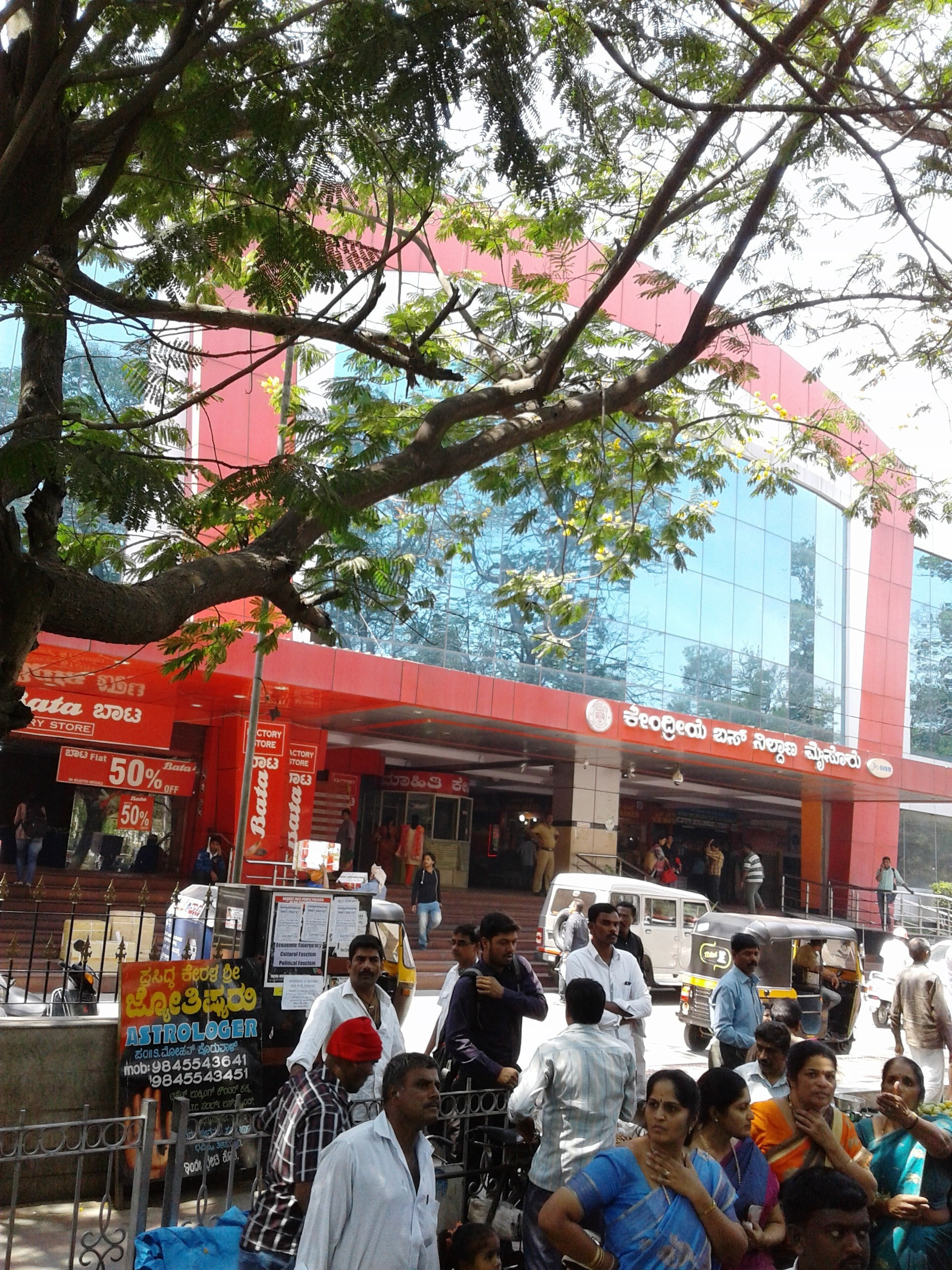
- Mysore Suburban Bus Station Entrance

General information
- Other names: Mysore sub-urban bus station Mysore Rural bus stand
- Location: Lashkar Mohalla, Mysore; Karnataka-570001; India
- Coordinates: 12.312257°N 76.658572°E
- System: Karnataka KSRTC, Kerala KSRTC; K-SWIFT,Tamil Nadu State Transport Corporation and State Express Transport Corporation Bus Station
- Owner: Karnataka KSRTC
- Operator: KSRTC
- Platforms: 1-45
- Bus routes: Karnataka; Tamil Nadu; Kerala; Goa; Telangana; Andhra Pradesh
- Bus operators: Karnataka State Road Transport Corporation; North Western Karnataka Road Transport Corporation; Kalyana Karnataka Road Transport Corporation; Kerala State Road Transport Corporation; KSRTC SWIFT; Tamil Nadu State Transport Corporation; State Express Transport Corporation

Construction
- Structure type: At-grade
- Parking: Available
- Accessible: Yes

Other information
- Fare zone: Mysore Rural Division

History
- Opened: 1948
Location

Mysuru Sub-Urban Bus Station is a key bus station hub located on Bangalore-Nilgiri Road in the Lashkar Mohalla area of Mysore. It's run by the Karnataka State Road Transport Corporation (KSRTC) and operates 24 hours a day, serving long-distance bus passengers.

== Location and connectivity ==
It is a hub for Karnataka State Road Transport Corporation,NWKRTC,KKRTC buses heading to major cities such as Bengaluru,Madikeri,Mangalore, Goa, Hubli-Dharwad and Thiruvananthapuram,Laxmeshwar. It also receives buses from neighbouring states like Kerala, Tamil Nadu and Andhra Pradesh. Karnataka State Road Transport Corporation (KSRTC) runs the long-distance bus services from Mysore to other parts of the state. The Coorg-Mysore-Bengaluru route is the most lucrative route. A mix of AC and non-AC services are offered, including sleeper and Volvo/ Airavat Club Class buses on longer routes.

The longest bus route served by KSRTC from Mysore is the Mysore - Bengaluru - Hyderabad route served by Airavat Club Class,Airavat Club Class 2.0, and Ambaari Dream Class served. FlyBus service is available to Bangalore Airport from here.

Frequent departures make it a common boarding point for travelers heading out of Mysore by bus.

== Gallery ==
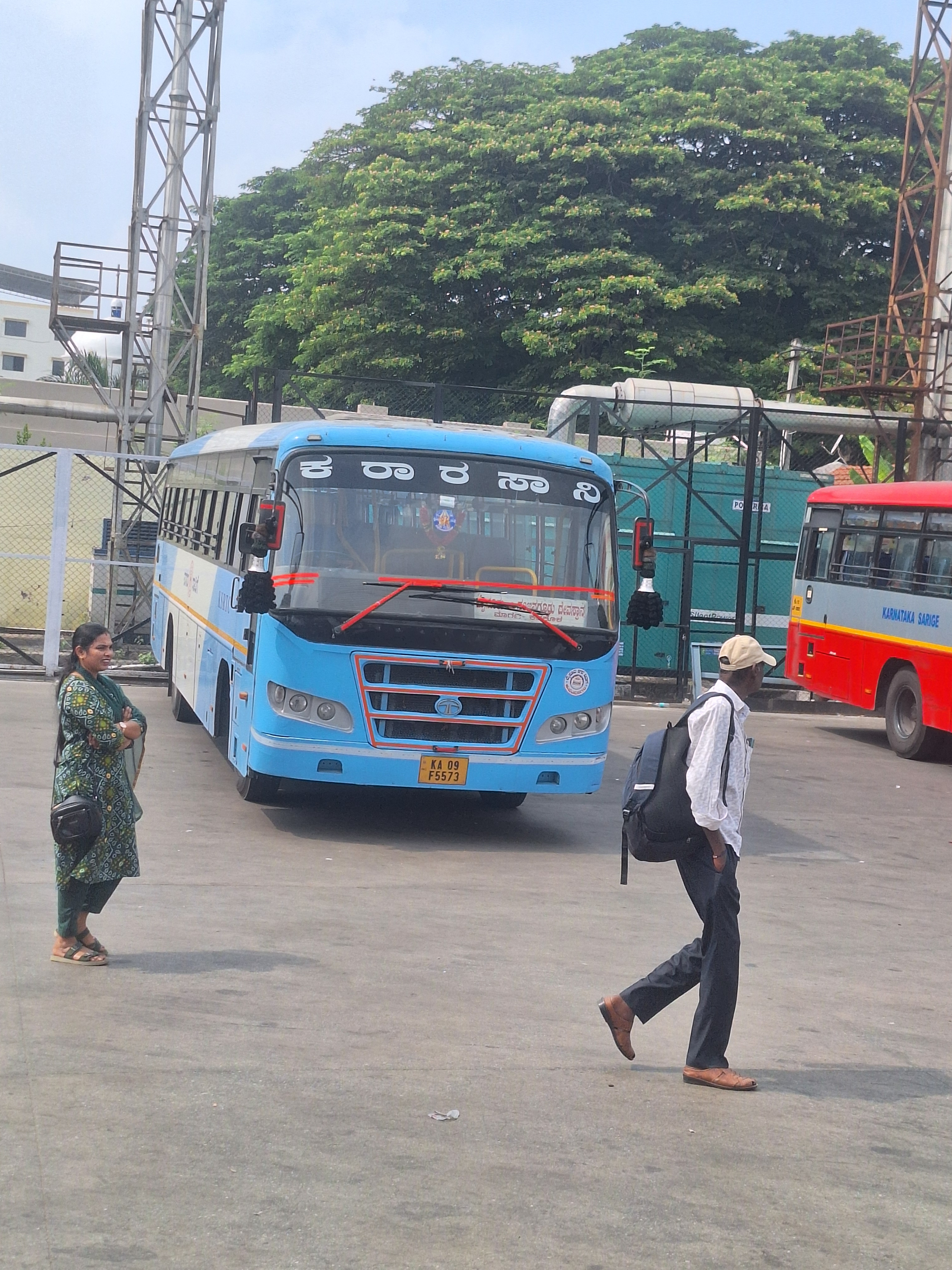
New livery Nagara Sarige at Mysore Suburban bus stand

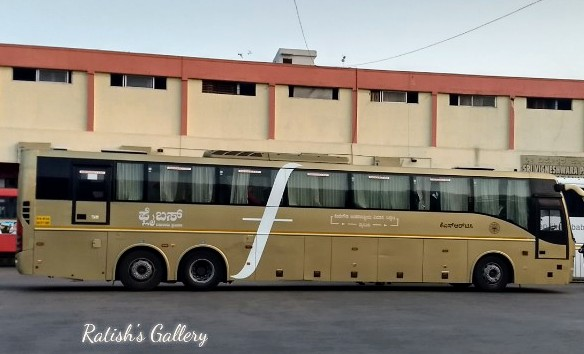
Flybus at KSRTC Central Bus stand Mysore
