= Karnataka Sarige =

Public bus service in India

Karnataka Sarige ಕರ್ನಾಟಕ ಸರಿಗೆ
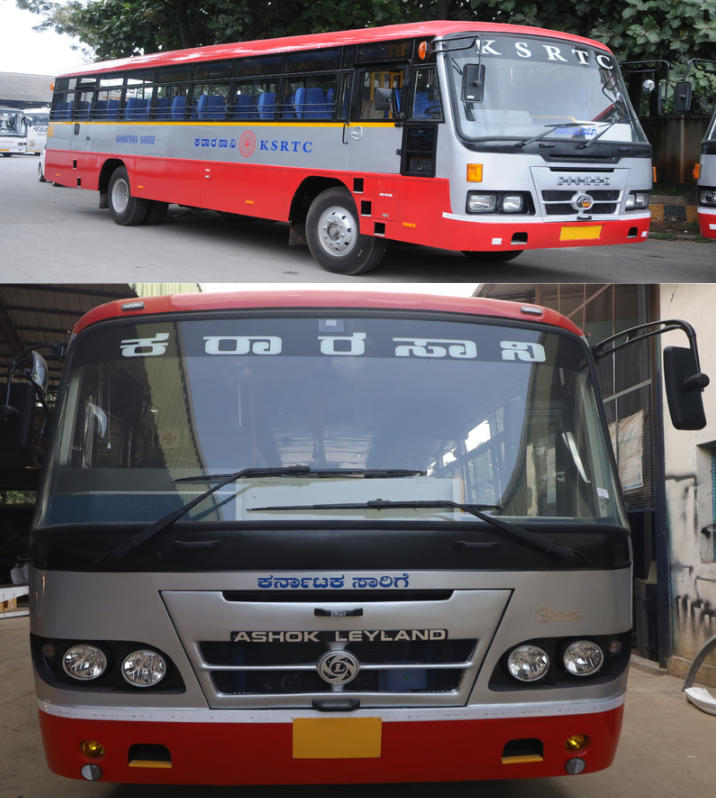
- Parent: Karnataka State Road Transport Corporation
- Locale: Dakshina Karnataka (Southern Karnataka)
- Service area: Dakshina Karnataka (Southern Karnataka)
- Service type: Non-AC Inter-city, Inter-State with Ashok Leyland, Eicher Motors, and Tata Motors chassis
- Fleet: 5,874
- Operator: Karnataka State Road Transport Corporation (under Government of Karnataka)
- Website: ksrtc.karnataka.gov.in/en

Karnataka Sarige or Kempu bus (red bus in Kannada), is a series of Economic Non-AC bus service operated by KSRTC across villages and districts of Karnataka. Consists highest fleet of KSRTC. And consists of 3+2 seat layout with no reclinable seats.

== Welfares and Schemes ==
=== 'Shakti Scheme' Free Bus Service for women ===
'Shakti Scheme' was announced by the Second Siddaramaiah ministry on 2 June 2023. It started on 11 June 2023, providing free-of-charge bus service to Karnataka-domiciled women. Beneficiaries show their government-issued photo identity and address proof for the first three months. Bus conductors issue them zero-fare tickets. Thereafter, beneficiaries obtain Shakti smartcards (named after the name of the scheme) through an application submitted via the government's Seva Sindhu website.

==== Terms and conditions of the scheme ====
- The scheme will apply to all four Road Transport Corporations in the state (KSRTC, BMTC, NWKRTC and KKRTC).
- Karnataka Sarige services is part of the scheme.
- Women can travel for free only on bus services within the state. Bus services to destinations outside Karnataka will be outside the scheme's purview even if women travel within the state. For example, a woman travelling to Mangaluru in Karnataka i.e., within the state on an Udupi-Kasaragod bus service which is an interstate service to Kasaragod in neighbouring Kerala, will have to buy a ticket.
- The scheme will not apply to luxury buses (Rajahamsa Executive Class, Airavat Class, Airavat Club Class, Pallakki Class, Ambaari Class, Ambaari Dream Class, Ambaari Utsav Class, Flybus, EV- Power Plus+services).
- Half of the seats on KSRTC ordinary and express buses will be reserved for men. Luxury, AC and interstate buses as well as BMTC buses will be exempted from this.
- The government will reimburse the KSRTC based on the distance women travel.

=== Free Bus passes for Students ===
In June 2026 Karnataka government under the chief ministry of D.K. Shivakumar announced free buses for students studying in karnataka from primary school to postgraduate level and border areas within 20 km of karnataka border.It is free for both boys and girls.

- Karnataka Sarige is part of this Scheme.

== Gallery ==
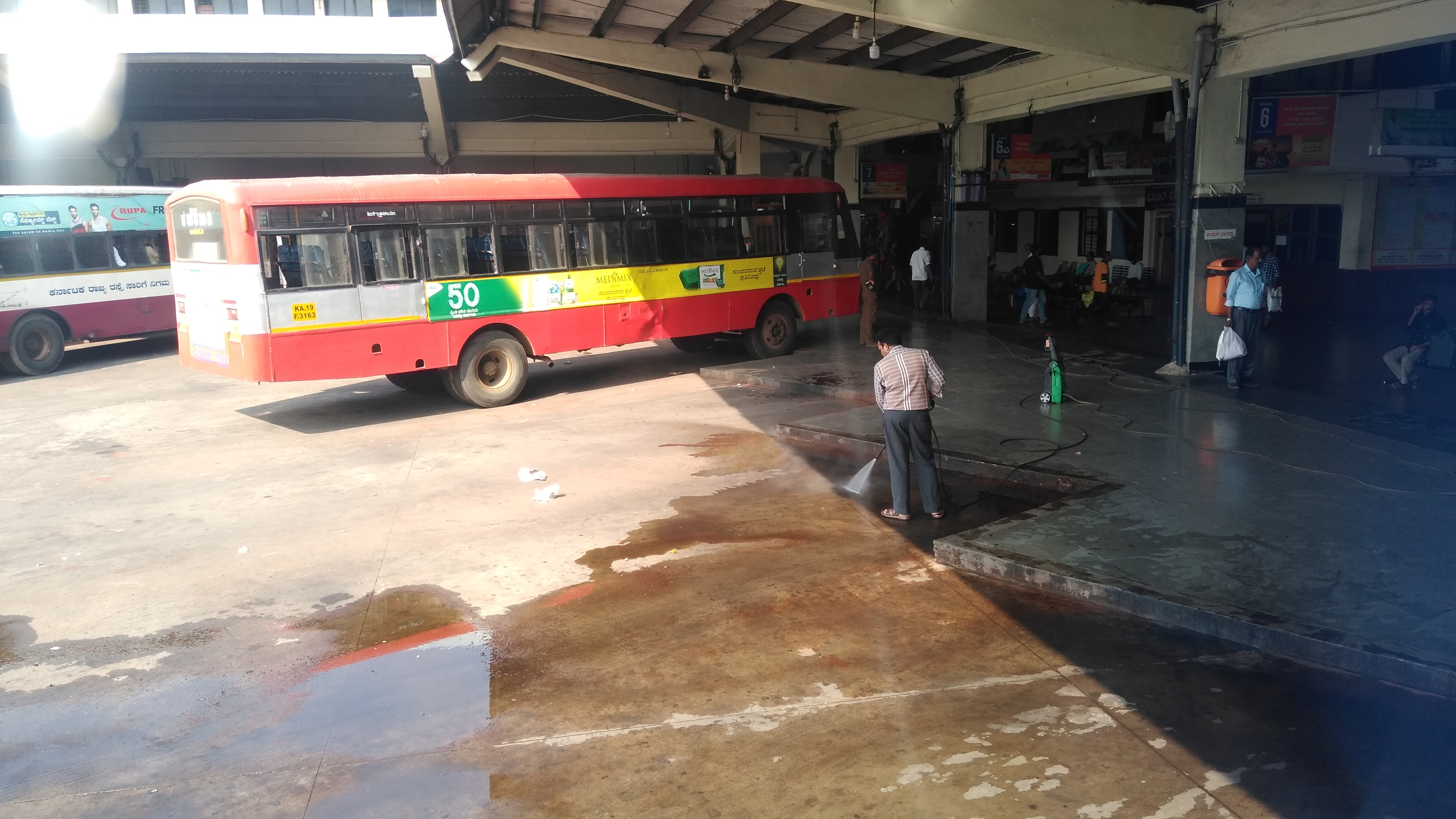
Sarige bus in Bejai bus stand

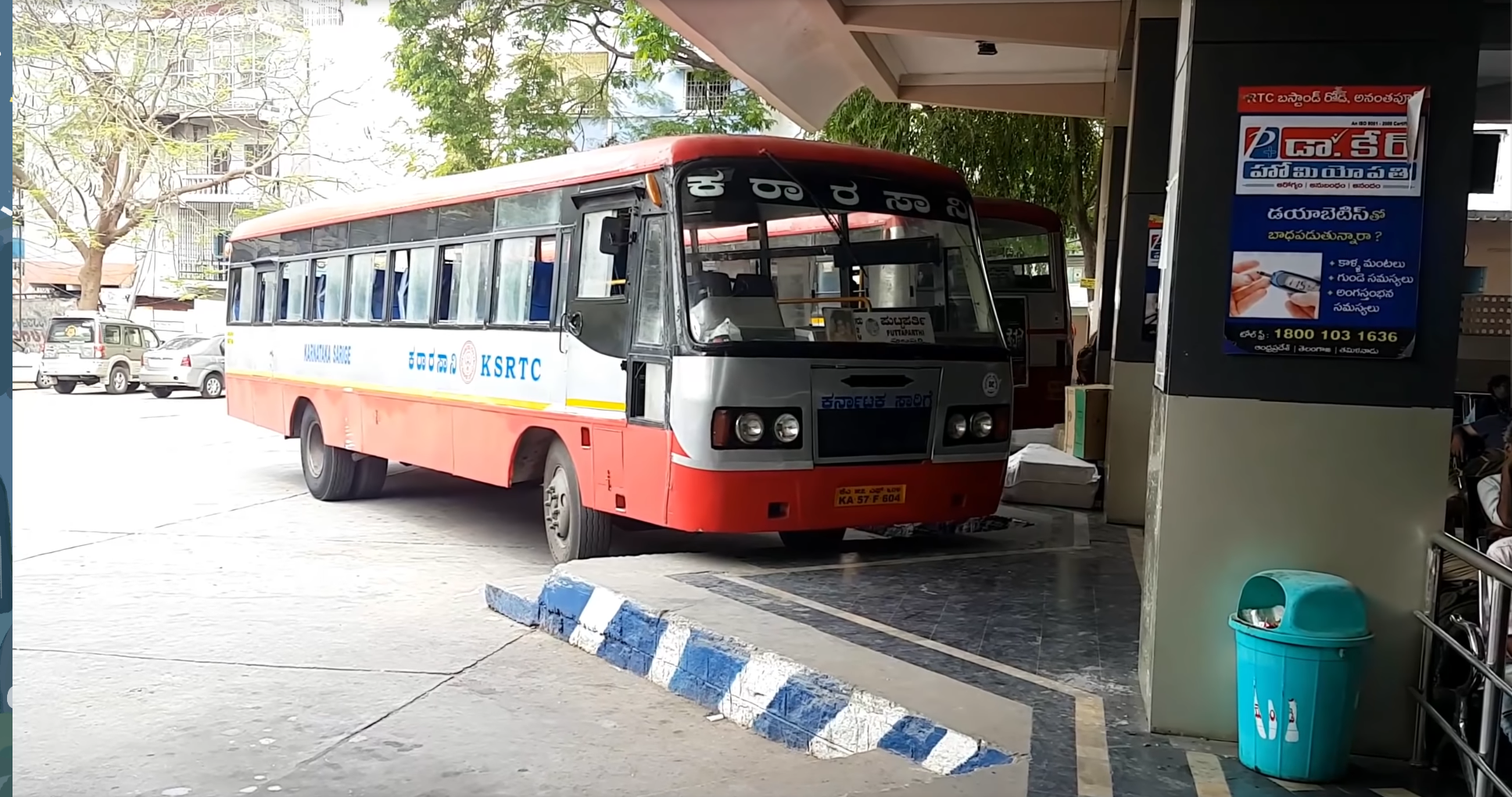
KSRTC Bus at puttaparthi

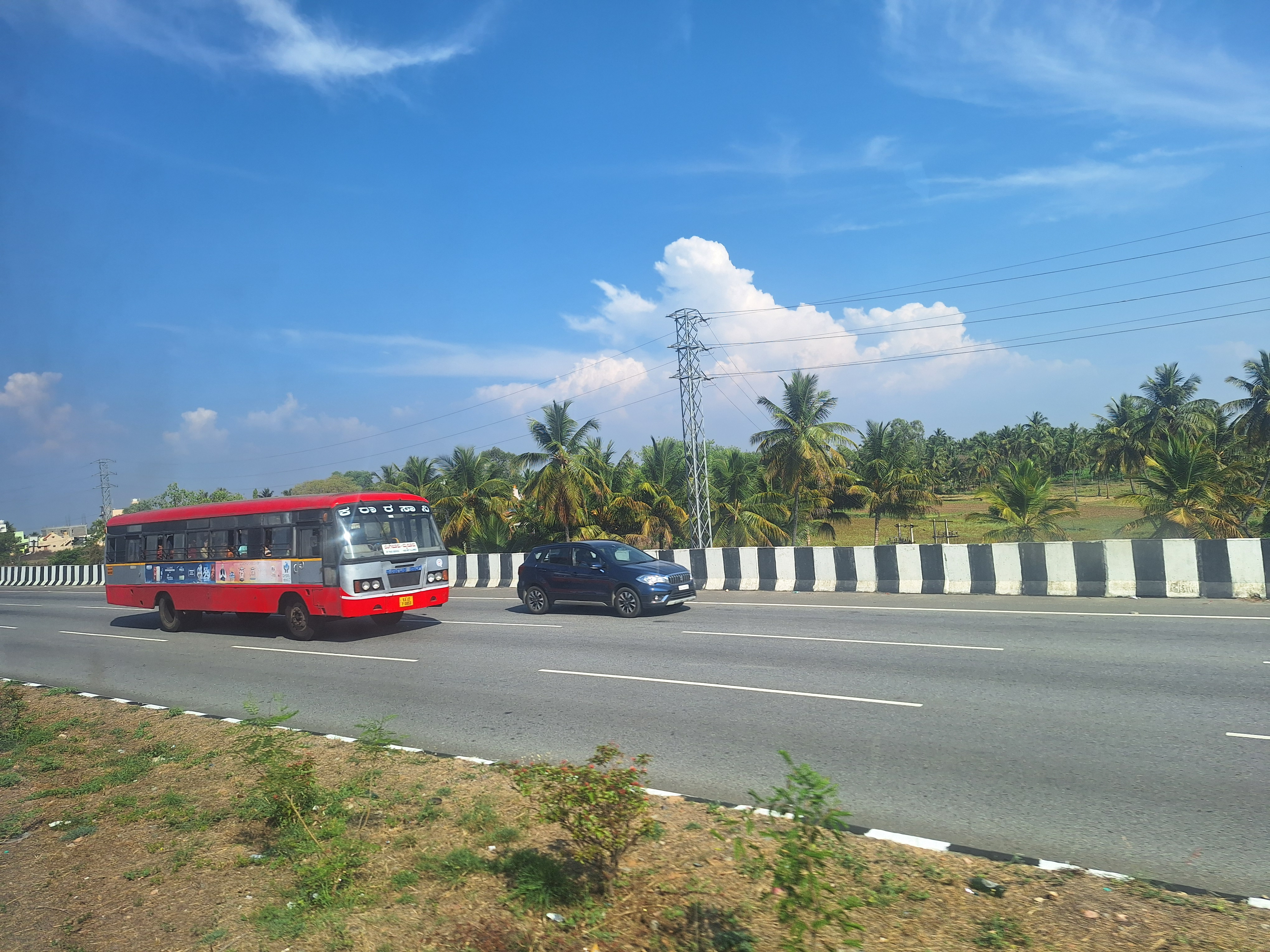
Karnataka Sarigebus in Bangalore-Mysuru Expressway

== See also ==
- Nagara Sarige
- Ashwamedha Classic Class
- Rajahamsa Executive Class
