= Pallakki Class =

Public bus service in India

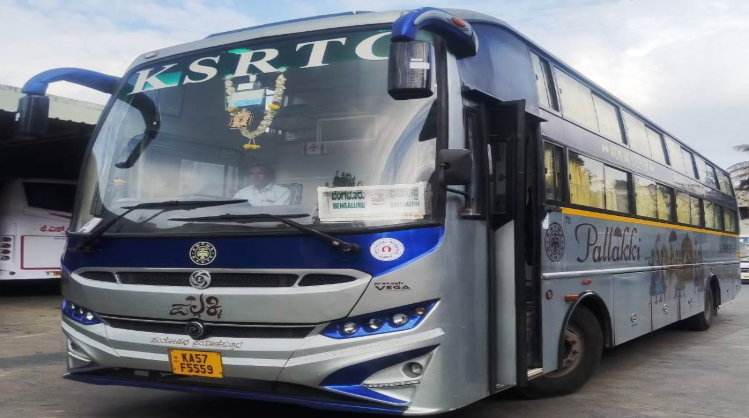
- Front view of KSRTC Pallakki Class
- Parent: Karnataka State Road Transport Corporation,North Western Karnataka Road Transport Corporation,Kalyana Karnataka Road Transport Corporation
- Founded: 8 October 2023
- Locale: Karnataka
- Service area: Karnataka
- Service type: Non-AC Premium Sleeper Inter-city, Inter-State with Ashok Leyland bus chassis
- Fleet: 110
- Operator: KSRTC,NWKRTC,KKRTC (as Amoghvarsha) (all under Government of Karnataka)
- Website: ksrtc.karnataka.gov.in/en

Pallakki Class(in Kannada it means palanquin-like vehicle traditionally used to carry deities during weddings or temple festivals.) is a series of Non-AC Premium Sleeper bus service operated by Karnataka State Road Transport Corporation,North Western Karnataka Road Transport Corporation and KKRTC (As Amoghvarsha) across cities and districts of Karnataka. It consists buses of Ashok leyland Viking 222 with a silver livery Chassis.

== History ==
It was launched on 8 October 2023 by then Chief minister of Karnataka Siddaramaiah and then Transport Minister of Karnataka Ramalinga Reddy by launching 40 pallakki class along with 100 Karnataka Sarige and Ac-sleeper Prototype from Vidhana Soudha.

== Description ==
It is an Non AC Premium Sleeper service which is operated by KSRTC, NWKRTC and KKRTC(under the brand name Amoghvarsha). It has 2+1 sleeping layout on both upper and lower berths. It consists bi-axle bus like its predecessor normal Non-AC sleeper service.It consists of BS-6 buses and it is replacing Old Non-Sleeper bus services like Non-AC sleeper service and Ambaari Class( all in KSRTC,KKRTC and NWKRTC).

Following its success KSRTC launced another set of 70 Pallakki buses in Vidhana Soudha.

== Gallery ==
First generation Pallakki Class bus in Kempegowda Bus Station

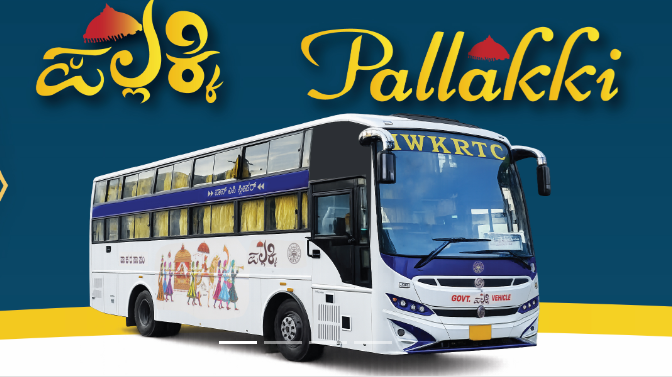
NWKRTC'S Pallakki Class

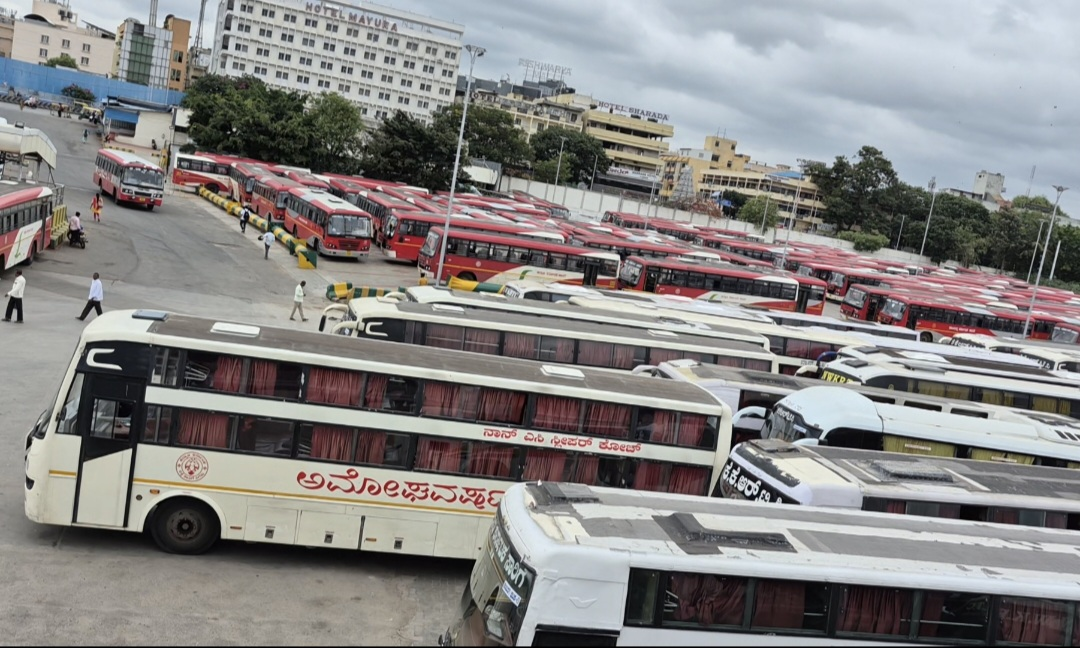
KKRTC'S Amoghvarsha(Non ac sleeper ) class at Kempegowda Bus Station

== See also ==
- Rajahamsa Executive Class
- Ambaari Class
