= Mani, Karnataka =

Mani
- village
- Location in Karnataka, India
- Coordinates: 12.831°N 75.103°E
- Country: India
- State: Karnataka
- District: Dakshina Kannada

Government
  - Type: Panchayat raj
  - Body: Gram panchayat

Languages
  - Official: Kannada, Tulu
- Time zone: UTC+5:30 (IST)
- ISO 3166 code: IN-KA
- Vehicle registration: KA
- Website: karnataka.gov.in

Mani is a village in India, between Mangalore and Bangalore along the NH-75. The terrain is hilly with paddy fields and arecanut plantations in between. Mani is the bifurcation point of NH-275.
