= Kalyana Karnataka Road Transport Corporation =

Public transport provider in India

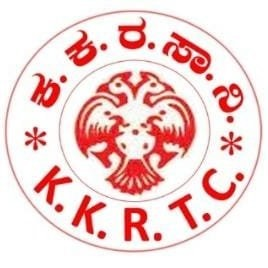
- Native name: Kalyāṇa Karnāṭaka Raste Sārige Nigama
- Romanized name: Kalyāṇa Karnāṭaka Raste Sārige Nigama
- Formerly: North Eastern Karnataka Road Transport Corporation (2000-2021)
- Type: Public
- Industry: Public transport bus service
- Predecessor: Part of Karnataka State Road Transport Corporation
- Founded: 15 August 2000 (26 years ago) as North Eastern Karnataka Road Transport Corporation; 6 July 2021 (5 years ago); renamed as Kalyana Karnataka Road Transport Corporation
- Headquarters: KKRTC Central Office, Sarige Sadana, Main Road, Mahaveer Nagara, Khuba Plot, Brhampura, Kalaburagi, Kalaburagi district, Karnataka, India
- Number of locations: 53 depots; 154 bus stations; KKRTC Central Office, Kalaburagi; Regional Workshop, Yadgir; Regional Training Institute, Humnabad; Regional Training Institute, Hagaribommanahalli, Vijayanagara district; Civil Engineering Division, Kalaburagi; Civil Engineering Division, Ballari
- Area served: Primary base: Kalaburagi; Bijapur; Bidar; Yadgir; Raichur; Koppal; Ballari; Vijayanagara; Intrastate: Bengaluru Urban; Bengaluru Rural; Ramanagara; Kolar; Chikkaballapura; Tumakuru; Chitradurga; Davanagere; Shimoga; Dakshina Kannada; Udupi; Chikmagalur; Hassan; Mysuru; Mandya; Kodagu; Dharwada; Uttara Kannada; Belagavi; Gadag; Bagalkot; Haveri; Interstate: Andhra Pradesh; Goa; Maharashtra; Tamil Nadu; Telangana
- Key people: Sri. M. Rachappa, KAS Managing Director; Dr. N. V. Prasad, IAS Secretary to Government, Department of Transport; Sri. Paresh Kumar Goel, ISDE Director (Transport), Ministry of Road Transport & Highways, Central Govt. Representative; Sri Shreekrishna N Bugatyagol Special Officer (ZP) & Ex-Officer Joint Secretary to Govt., Department of Finanace; Sri. Byrathi Suresh , MLA Chairperson, KKRTC & Minister for Transport & Muzrai, Government of Karnataka
- Brands: Kalyana Karnataka Sarige; Kalyana Gramantara Sarige; Kalyana Nagara Sarige; Rajahamsa Executive Class; Amoghavarsha Class; Ambaari Class; Kalyana Ratha Class
- Services: Public transport
- Owner: Government of Karnataka
- Number of employees: 19430
- Parent: Department of Transport, Government of Karnataka
- Divisions: 9 divisions: Ballari; Bidar; Bijapur; Hospet; Kalaburagi - 01; Kalaburagi - 02; Koppal; Raichur; Yadgir
- Website: KKRTC Main Website; All Karnataka's RTCs Ticket Reservation; Namma Cargo Logistics and Parcel Services
- Footnotes; 4531 buses serve 12.31 lakh passengers per day

The Kalyana Karnataka Road Transport Corporation (KKRTC) is a state-owned public road transport corporation in the Indian state of Karnataka. It is wholly owned by the Government of Karnataka. It serves routes to towns and cities in the Northeastern part of Karnataka plus Bijapur district and connects it to the rest of the state and the states of Andhra Pradesh, Goa, Maharashtra, Tamil Nadu and Telangana.

== History ==
=== Foundation ===
Mysore Government Road Transport Department (MGRTD) was inaugurated on 12 September 1948 with 120 buses. The transport department of the Mysore state administered it until 1961.

=== Corporatization ===
It was subsequently converted into an independent corporation under Section 3 of the Road Transport Corporation Act, 1950, on 1 August 1961. All assets and liabilities of MGRTD were transferred to Mysore State Road Transport Corporation (MSRTC).

=== Merger ===
On 1 October 1961, Bangalore Transport Service was merged with it.

=== Renaming ===
On 1 November 1973, the state of Mysore was renamed "Karnataka", leading to a renaming of MSRTC to Karnataka State Road Transport Corporation (KSRTC).

=== Bifurcation ===
- On 15 August 1997, Bangalore Metropolitan Transport Corporation (then Bangalore Metropolitan Transport Corporation, BMTC) was bifurcated to cater to the transportation needs of Bangalore Metropolitan Region. It was formed by separating the Bangalore Transport Service.
- On 1 November 1997, North Western Karnataka Road Transport Corporation (NWKRTC) was bifurcated to cater to the transportation needs of Northwestern parts of Karnataka.
- On 15 August 2000, Kalyana Karnataka Road Transport Corporation (KKRTC) (then North Eastern Karnataka Road Transport Corporation) was bifurcated to cater to the transportation needs of Northeastern parts of Karnataka. This left the Karnataka State Road Transport Corporation to serve the southern part of Karnataka.
- On 23 November 2009, Bijapur division was transferred from NWKRTC to KKRTC.

== Services ==
| Name of the Service | Description | Manufacturer | Gallery |
|---|---|---|---|
| Kalyana Karnataka Sarige | It is a non-AC bus service with 3+2 non-reclining seats built on single-axle Ashok Leyland, Tata and Eicher suburban chassis with a tirangi livery of three colours consisting of white, yellow and crimson colours. It is an interdistrict, interstate service in Kalyana Karnataka (North-eastern Karnataka) and Bijapura district. | Ashok Leyland; Tata; Eicher | Kalyana Karnataka Sarige |
| Kalyana Gramantara Sarige | It is a non-AC bus service with 3+2 non-reclining seats built on single-axle Ashok Leyland, Tata and Eicher suburban chassis with a durangi livery of dual colours consisting of blue and white colours. It is a service to connect villages to nearby cities and towns in Kalyana Karnataka (North-eastern Karnataka) and Bijapur district. | Ashok Leyland; Tata; Eicher | |
| Kalyana Nagara Sarige | IIt is a non-AC bus service with 2+2 non-reclining seats built on single-axle Ashok Leyland, Tata and Eicher urban chassis with various liveries and branding depending upon the locale. It is an intracity and town service in Kalyana Karnataka (North-eastern Karnataka) and Bijapur district. | Ashok Leyland; Tata; Eicher | Nagara Sarige bus in Kalaburagi |
| Rajahamsa Executive Class | It is a non-AC bus service with 2+2 reclining seats built on single-axle Ashok Leyland, Tata and Eicher urban chassis with various liveries and branding depending upon the locale. It is an intracity and town service in Kalyana Karnataka (North-eastern Karnataka) and Bijapur district. | Ashok Leyland; Tata; Eicher | |
| Non-AC Sleeper Class | It is a non-AC ultra-deluxe bus service with 2+1 lower and upper berth sleeper seats built on bi-axle Ashok Leyland, Tata and Eicher chassis with a white livery. It is a long-distance service operating out of Kalyana Karnataka (North-eastern Karnataka) and Bijapur district. | Ashok Leyland; Tata; Eicher | NKKRTC'S Non AC Sleeper Bus |
| Amoghavarsha Class | t is a non-AC ultra-deluxe bus service with 2+1 lower and upper berth sleeper seats built on bi-axle Ashok Leyland chassis with a white livery. It is a long-distance service operating out of Kalyana Karnataka (North-eastern Karnataka) and Bijapur district. | Ashok Leyland | KKRTC'S Amoghvarsha(Non ac sleeper ) class at Kempegowda Bus Station |
| AC SEATER EXECUTIVE CHAIR | It is an AC luxury bus service with 2+2 reclining seats built on single-axle Ashok Leyland with a green livery. t is a long-distance service operating out of Kalyana Karnataka (North-eastern Karnataka) and Bijapur district.It is similar to Rajahamsha executive claas but this is a ac class. | Ashok Leyland | |
| Ambaari Class | It is an AC luxury bus service with 2+1 lower and upper berth sleeper seats built on a single-axle Corona chassis with a white livery. It is a long-distance service operating out of Kalyana Karnataka (North-eastern Karnataka) and Bijapur district. | Corona | KKRTC'S AC Sleeper Ambaari Class |
| Mini-Kalyana Ratha Class | It is an AC luxury bus service with 2+1 lower and upper berth sleeper seats on a Ashok Leyland bi-axle sleeper with a Hampi chariot livery. t is a long-distance service operating out of Kalyana Karnataka (North-eastern Karnataka) and Bijapur district. | Ashok Leyland | Mini-Kalyana Ratha KKRTC bus durng its inaugration time |
| Kalyana Ratha Class | It is an AC luxury bus service with 2+1 lower and upper berth sleeper seats on a Volvo 9600 multi-axle sleeper with a white livery. t is a long-distance service operating out of Kalyana Karnataka (North-eastern Karnataka) and Bijapur district. | Volvo | AC -Sleeper 9600 Volvo bus operated by KKRTC |

== Former services ==
| Name of the Service | Description | Manufacturer |
|---|---|---|
| Meghdooth Class | It was an AC luxury bus service with 2+2 reclining seats built on a single-axle Ashok Leyland chassis with a dark blue-white livery. It is a long-distance service operating out of Kalyana Karnataka (North-eastern Karnataka) and Bijapur district. This service was replaced with Sheethal Class. | Ashok Leyland |
| Sheethal Class | It was an AC luxury bus service with 2+2 reclining seats built on a single-axle Ashok Leyland chassis with a green livery. It is a long-distance service operating out of Kalyana Karnataka (North-eastern Karnataka) and Bijapur district. | Ashok Leyland |
| Vaibhav Class | It was a non-AC semi-deluxe bus service with 2+2 reclining seats with less reclining compared to Rajahamsa Executive Class built on a single-axle Ashok Leyland chassis with a green livery. It is a long-distance service operating out of Kalyana Karnataka (North-eastern Karnataka) and Bijapur district. Currently defunct. | Ashok Leyland; Tata Motors |
| Suhasa Class | It was a non-AC ultra-deluxe bus service with 2+2 reclining seats built on Ashok Leyland, Tata and Eicher chassis with a yellow livery. It is a long-distance service operating out of Kalyana Karnataka (North-eastern Karnataka) and Bijapur district. Rebranded and merged with Rajahamsa Executive Class. | Ashok Leyland; Tata Motors; Eicher |

== 'Shakti Scheme' free bus service for women ==
'Shakti Scheme' was announced by the Second Siddaramaiah ministry on 2 June 2023. It started on 11 June 2023, providing free-of-charge bus service to Karnataka domicile women. Beneficiaries show their government-issued photo identity and address proof for the first three months. Bus conductors issue them zero-fare tickets Thereafter, beneficiaries obtain Shakti smartcards (named after the name of the scheme) through an application process on the government's Seva Sindhu website.

=== Terms and conditions of the scheme ===
- The scheme will apply to all four Road Transport Corporations in the state (KSRTC, BMTC, NWKRTC and KKRTC).
- Nagara Sarige, Gramantara Sarige, Karnataka Sarige, Vayavya Nagara Sarige, Vayavya Gramantara Sarige, Vayavya Karnataka Sarige, Kalyana Nagara Sarige, Kalyana Gramantara Sarige, Kalyana Karnataka Sarige, Bengaluru Sarige, Samparka and Astra services will be part of the scheme.
- Women can travel for free only on bus services within the state. Bus services to destinations outside Karnataka will be outside the scheme's purview even if women travel within the state. For example, a woman travelling to Ballari in Karnataka i.e., within the state on a Hosapet-Anantapuramu bus service which is an interstate service to Anantapuramu in neighbouring Andhra Pradesh, then the woman passenger will have to buy a ticket.
- The scheme will not apply to luxury buses (Rajahamsa Executive Class, Airavat Class, Airavat Club Class, Pallakki Class, Amoghavarsha Class, Ambaari Class, Ambaari Dream Class, Ambaari Utsav Class, Kalyana Ratha Class, Flybus, EV- Power Plus+, Bengaluru Darshini, Vajra and Vayu Vajra services).
- Half of the seats on KSRTC, NWKRTC and KKRTC's ordinary and express buses will be reserved for men. Luxury, AC and interstate buses as well as BMTC buses will be exempted from this.
- The government will reimburse the RTCs based on the distance women travel.

== Karnataka's road transport undertakings ==
- KSRTC, Bangalore: Operates out of Southern Karnataka.
- NWKRTC, Hubli: Operates out of North-Western Karnataka except Bijapur district.
- KKRTC, Kalaburagi: Operates out of North-Eastern Karnataka and Bijapur district.
- BMTC, Bangalore: Operates in Bangalore Metropolitan Region offering transit service.

== Namma Cargo Logistics and Parcel Services ==
Namma Cargo Logistics and Parcel Services was launched on 26 February 2021. It provides cargo and parcel services on the routes in which the KSRTC, NWKRTC and KKRTC buses travel.

== See also ==
- List of bus depots in Karnataka
- List of bus stations in Karnataka
- North Western Karnataka Road Transport Corporation
- Karnataka State Road Transport Corporation
- Bangalore Metropolitan Transport Corporation
