= Rajahamsa Executive Class =

Public bus service in India

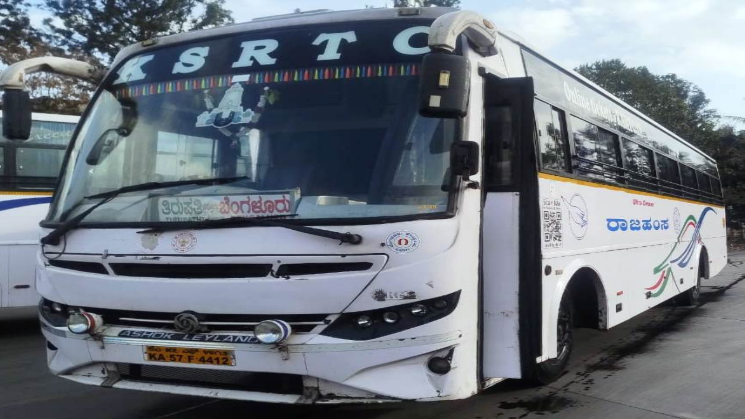
- Parent: Karnataka State Road Transport Corporation,North Western Karnataka Road Transport Corporation,Kalyana Karnataka Road Transport Corporation
- Locale: Karnataka
- Service area: Karnataka
- Service type: Non-AC Ultra-Deluxe Inter-city, Inter-State with Ashok Leyland, Eicher Motors, and Tata Motors chassis
- Fleet: 127
- Operator: KSRTC,NWKRTC,KKRTC (all under Government of Karnataka)
- Website: ksrtc.karnataka.gov.in/en

Rajahamsa Executive Class is a series of Ultra Deluxe Non-AC bus service operated by Karnataka RTC's (except for Bangalore Metropolitan Transport Corporation) across villages and districts of Karnataka. It consists chassis of Ashok Leyland, Tata Motors, Eicher.

== Description ==
It is an ultra-deluxe service which is operated by KSRTC, NWKRTC and KKRTC. It has 2+2 seat layout unlike Karnataka Sarige which has 3+2 seating layout. It consists of less reclinable seats. Shakti Scheme doesn't apply in this bus service. There is discount for Senior Citizens in this bus service.

== Gallery ==
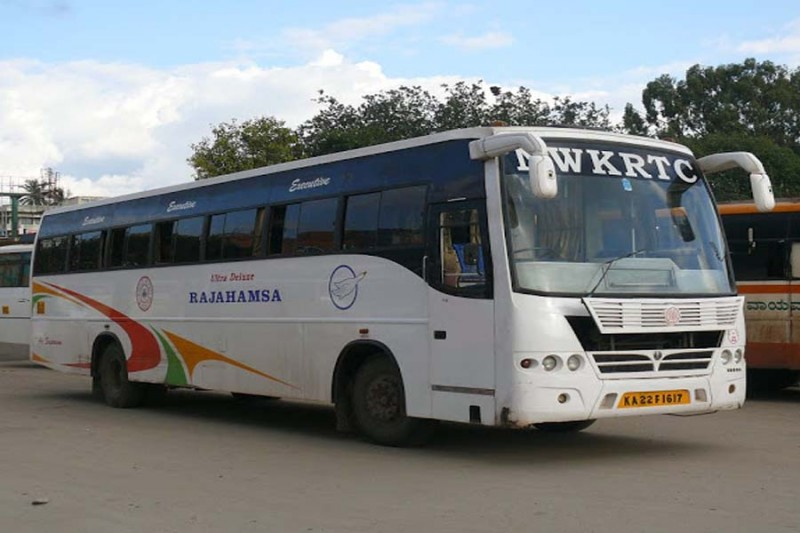
NWKRTC'S RAJHAMSA

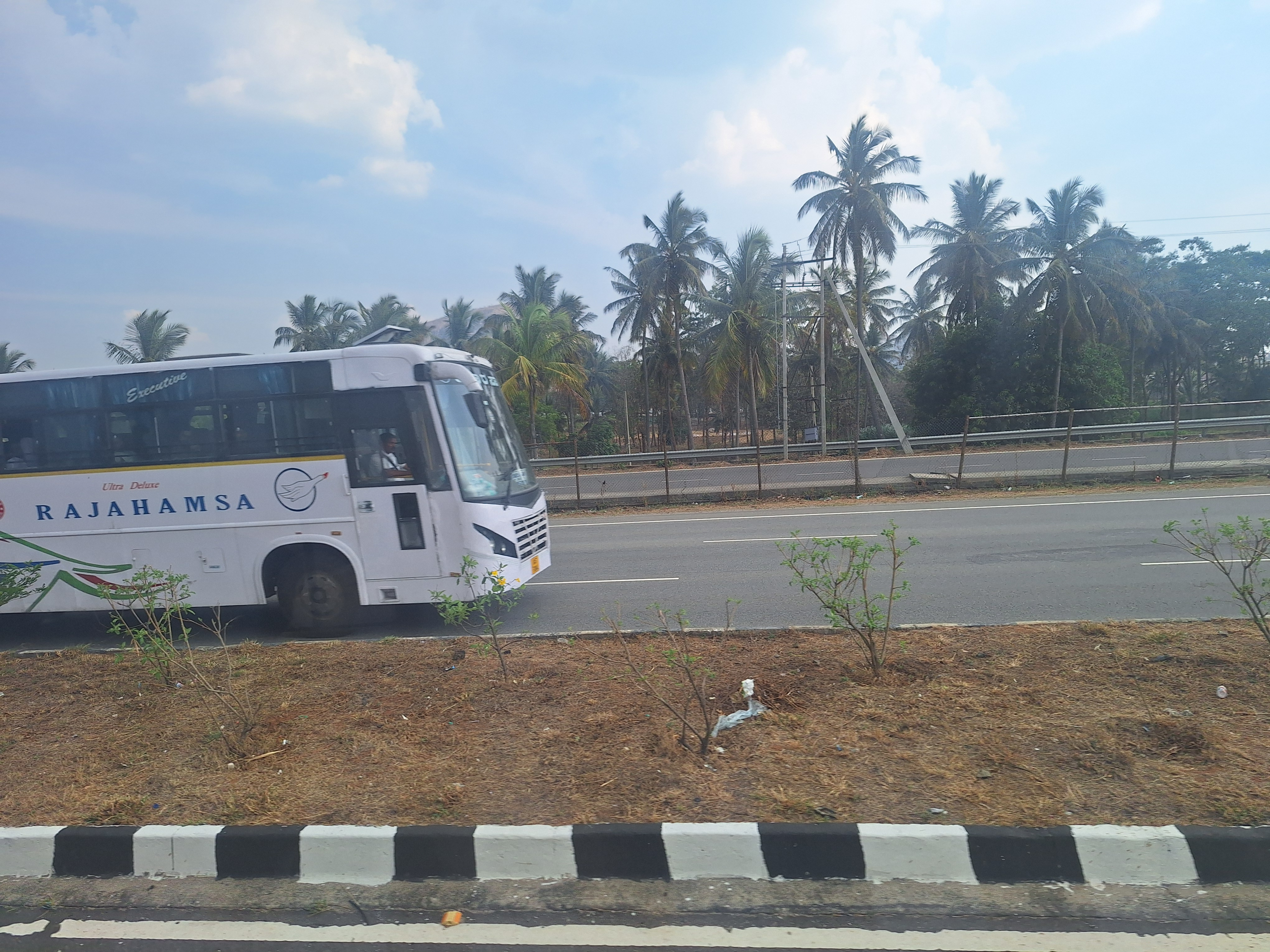
Rajahamsa bus in Bangalore-Mysuru Expressway

== See also ==
- Airavat Club Class
- Ashwamedha Classic Class
- Karnataka Sarige
- Ambaari Class
