= North Western Karnataka Road Transport Corporation =

Transport corporation of Karnataka

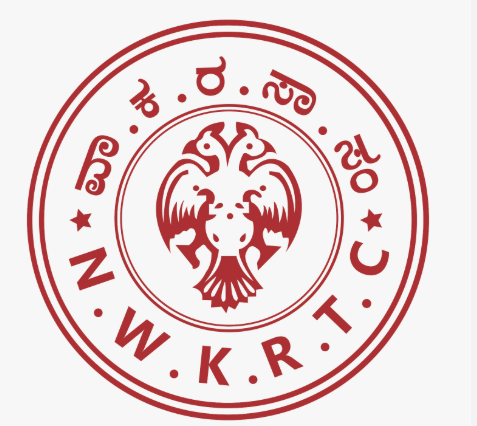
- Native name: ವಾಯವ್ಯ ಕರ್ಣಾಟಕ ರಸ್ತೆ ಸರಿಗೆ ನಿಗಮ
- Romanized name: Vāyavya Karnāṭaka Raste Sārige Nigama
- Type: Public
- Industry: Public transport bus service
- Predecessor: Part of Karnataka State Road Transport Corporation
- Founded: 1 November 1997; 28 years ago
- Headquarters: NWRTC Central Office, Sarige Sadana, Gokul Road, Industrial Estate,, Hubli, Dharwad district, Karnataka, India
- Number of locations: 56 Depots; 176 Bus Stations; NWKRTC Central Office, Hubballi; Regional Workshop, Hubli; Regional Training Institute, Hubballi
- Area served: Primary Base: Dharwad; Uttara Kannada; Belagavi; Gadag; Bagalkot; Haveri; Intrastate: Bangalore Urban; Bangalore Rural; Ramanagara; Kolar; Chikkaballapura; Tumakuru; Chitradurga; Davanagere; Shimoga; Dakshina Kannada; Udupi; Chikmagalur; Hassan; Mysore; Mandya; Chamarajanagara; Kodagu; Kalaburagi; Bijapur; Bidar; Yadgir; Raichur; Koppal; Ballari; Vijayanagara; Interstate: Tamil Nadu; Andhra Pradesh; Telangana; Maharashtra; Goa
- Key people: Bharath. S, IAS Managing Director; Nitish. K, IAS Deputy Secretary (Budget & Resources), Department of Finance; N. V. Prasad, IAS Secretary to Government, Department of Transport; Paresh Kumar Goel, ISDE Director (Transport), Ministry of Road Transport & Highways, Central Govt. Representative; Ramalinga Reddy, MLA Chairperson, NWKRTC & Minister for Transport & Muzrai, Government of Karnataka
- Brands: Vayavya Karnataka Sarige; Vayavya Gramantara Sarige; Vayavya Nagara Sarige; Rajahamsa Executive Class; Non-AC Sleeper Class; Airavat Club Class; Ambaari Class; Ambaari Utsav Class; Pallakki Class; Raja Ratha Class
- Services: Public transport
- Owner: Government of Karnataka
- Number of employees: 22008
- Parent: Department of Transport, Government of Karnataka
- Divisions: 9 Divisions: Belagavi; Uttara Kannada; Gadag; Dharwad Rural; Hubli Rural; Chikkodi; Bagalkote; Haveri; Hubli-Dharwad
- Website: NWKRTC Main Website; All Karnataka's RTCs Ticket Reservation; Namma Cargo Logistics and Parcel Services
- Footnotes; 5398 buses serve 25.93 lakh passengers per day

The North Western Karnataka Road Transport Corporation (NWKRTC) is a state-owned public road transport corporation in the Indian state of Karnataka. It is wholly owned by the Government of Karnataka. It serves routes to towns and cities in the Northwestern part of Karnataka except Bijapur district and connects it to the rest of the state and the states of Tamil Nadu, Telangana, Andhra Pradesh, Maharashtra and Goa.

== History ==
=== Foundation ===
Mysore Government Road Transport Department was inaugurated on 12 September 1948 with 120 buses. The transport department of The Mysore state administered it until 1961.

=== Corporatization ===
It was subsequently converted into an independent corporation under Section 3 of the Road Transport Corporation Act, 1950 on 1 August 1961, In 1961, after successfully converting into an independent corporation all assets and liabilities of MGRTD were transferred to Mysore State Road Transport Corporation.

=== Merger ===
On 1 October 1961, Bangalore Transport Service was merged with it.

=== Renaming ===
On 1 November 1973, the Mysore state was renamed as Karnataka thus, renaming it Karnataka State Road Transport Corporation.

=== Bifurcation ===
- On 15 August 1997, Bangalore Metropolitan Transport Corporation was bifurcated to cater to the transportation needs of Bangalore Metropolitan Region. It was formed by separating the Bangalore Transport Service.
- on 1 November 1997, North Western Karnataka Road Transport Corporation was bifurcated to cater to the transportation needs of Northwestern parts of Karnataka.
- On 15 August 2000, Kalyana Karnataka Road Transport Corporation (then North Eastern Karnataka Road Transport Corporation) was bifurcated to cater to the transportation needs of Northeastern parts of Karnataka.

This left the Karnataka State Road Transport Corporation to serve the Southern and central parts of Karnataka.

- On 23 November 2009, Bijapur division was transferred from NWKRTC to KKRTC.

== Services ==
Name of the Service	Description	Manufacturer	Gallery
Vayavya Karnataka Sarige	It is a non-AC bus service with 3+2 non-reclining seats built on bi-axle Ashok Leyland, Tata and Eicher suburban chassis with a panchrangi livery of five colours consisting of white, yellow, red, light green and dark green colours. It is an interdistrict, interstate service in Kitturu Karnataka (Northwestern Karnataka) except Bijapur district.	Ashok Leyland; Tata; Eicher	NWKRTC'S Vayavya Karnataka Sarige in Bejai bus stand
Vayavya Gramantara Sarige	It is a non-AC bus service with 3+2 non-reclining seats built on bi-axle Ashok Leyland, Tata and Eicher suburban chassis with a durangi livery of two colours consisting of blue and white colours. It is a service to connect villages to nearby cities and towns in Kitturu Karnataka (Northwestern Karnataka) except Bijapur district.	Ashok Leyland; Tata; Eicher	
Vayavya Nagara Sarige	It is a non-AC bus service with 2+2 non-reclining seats built on bi-axle Ashok Leyland, Tata and Eicher urban chassis with various liveries depending upon the locale. It is an intracity and town service in Kitturu Karnataka (Northwestern Karnataka) except Bijapur district.	Ashok Leyland; Tata; Eicher	
Rajahamsa Executive Class	It is a non-AC ultra-deluxe bus service with 2+2 reclining semi-sleeper seats built on bi-axle Ashok Leyland, Tata and Eicher chassis with a white livery. It is a long-distance service operating out of Kitturu Karnataka (Northwestern Karnataka) except Bijapur district.	Ashok Leyland; Tata; Eicher	NWKRTC'S non-ac Ultra deluxe Rajhamsa bus
Non-AC Sleeper Class	It is a non-AC ultra-deluxe bus service with 2+1 lower and upper berth sleeper seats built on bi-axle Ashok Leyland, Tata and Eicher chassis with a white livery. It is a long-distance service operating out of Kitturu Karnataka (Northwestern Karnataka) except Bijapur district.	Ashok Leyland; Tata; Eicher	NWKRTC'S Non AC Sleeper
Pallakki Class	It is a non-AC ultra-deluxe bus service with 2+1 lower and upper berth sleeper seats built on bi-axle Ashok Leyland BS6 Prakash Capella model chassis with a dark livery. It is a long-distance service operating out of Kitturu Karnataka (Northwestern Karnataka) except Bijapur district.	Ashok Leyland	NWKRTC'S non ac sleeper Pallakki bus
Raja Ratha Class	It is a AC luxury bus service with 2+1 lower and upper berth sleeper seats built on bi-axle Ashok Leyland Viking 222WB 11.3m chassis with a white livery. It is a long-distance service operating out of Kitturu Karnataka (Northwestern Karnataka) except Bijapur district.	Ashok Leyland	NWKRTC'S Ac-Sleeper Raja Ratha bus
Airavat Club Class	It is an AC luxury bus service with 2+2 reclining seats built on a multi-axle Volvo chassis with a white livery. It is a long-distance service operating out of Kitturu Karnataka (Northwestern Karnataka) except Bijapur district.	Volvo	NWKRTC'S Airavata-CLUB CLASS
Airavat Gold Class	It is an AC luxury bus service with 2+2 reclining seats built on a multi-axle Volvo chassis with a yellow livery. It is a long-distance service operating out of Kitturu Karnataka (Northwestern Karnataka) except Bijapur district.	Volvo	Airavat -Gold Class
Ambaari Class	It is an AC luxury bus service with 2+1 lower and upper berth sleeper seats built on a bi-axle Corona chassis with a white livery. It is a long-distance service operating out of Kitturu Karnataka (Northwestern Karnataka) except Bijapur district.	Corona	NWKRTC'S Ambaari AC-Sleeper Class
Ambaari Utsav Class	It is an AC luxury bus service with 2+1 lower and upper berth sleeper seats on a Volvo 9600 multi-axle sleeper with a white livery. It is a long-distance service operating out of Kitturu Karnataka (Northwestern Karnataka) except Bijapur district.	Volvo	NWKRTC'S Ambaari Utsav Class

== Former Services ==
Name of the Service	Description	Manufacturer
Meghdooth Class	It was an AC luxury bus service with 2+2 reclining seats built on a single-axle Ashok Leyland chassis with a dark blue-white livery. It is a long-distance service operating out of Kitturu Karnataka (Northwestern Karnataka) except Bijapur district. This service was replaced with Sheethal Class.	Ashok Leyland
Sheethal Class	It was an AC luxury bus service with 2+2 reclining seats built on a single-axle Ashok Leyland chassis with a green livery. It is a long-distance service operating out of Kitturu Karnataka (Northwestern Karnataka) except Bijapur district. This service was replaced with Airavat Gold Class.	Ashok Leyland
Vaibhav Class	It was a non-AC semi-deluxe bus service with 2+2 reclining seats with less reclining compared to Rajahamsa Executive Class built on a single-axle Ashok Leyland chassis with a green livery. It is a long-distance service operating out of Kitturu Karnataka (Northwestern Karnataka) except Bijapur district. Currently defunct.	Ashok Leyland; Tata Motors

== 'Shakti Scheme' Free Bus Service for women ==
'Shakti Scheme' was announced by the Second Siddaramaiah ministry on 2 June 2023. It started on 11 June 2023, providing free-of-charge bus service to Karnataka domicile women. Beneficiaries show their government-issued photo identity and address proof for the first three months. Bus conductors will issue them zero-fare tickets Thereafter, beneficiaries will have to obtain Shakti smartcards (named after the name of the scheme) through an application process on the government's Seva Sindhu website.

=== Terms and conditions of the scheme ===
- The scheme will apply to all four Road Transport Corporations in the state (KSRTC, BMTC, NWKRTC and KKRTC).
- Nagara Sarige, Gramantara Sarige, Karnataka Sarige, Vayvya Nagara Sarige, Vayavya Gramantara Sarige, Vayavya Karnataka Sarige, Kalyana Nagara Sarige, Kalyana Gramantara Sarige, Kalyana Karnataka Sarige, Bengaluru Sarige, Samparka and Astra services will be part of the scheme.
- Women can travel for free only on bus services within the state. Bus services to destinations outside Karnataka will be outside the scheme's purview even if women travel within the state. For example, a woman travelling to Belagavi in Karnataka i.e., within the state on a Hubli-Kolhapur bus service which is an interstate service to Kolhapur in neighbouring Maharashtra, then the woman passenger will have to buy a ticket.
- The scheme will not apply to luxury buses (Rajahamsa Executive Class, Airavat Class, Airavat Club Class, Pallakki Class, Amoghavarsha Class, Ambaari Class, Ambaari Dream Class, Ambaari Utsav Class, Kalyana Ratha Class, Flybus, EV- Power Plus+, Bengaluru Darshini, Vajra and Vayu Vajra services).
- Half of the seats on KSRTC, NWKRTC and KKRTC's ordinary and express buses will be reserved for men. Luxury, AC and interstate buses as well as BMTC buses will be exempted from this.
- The government will reimburse the RTCs based on the distance women travel.

== Karnataka's Road Transport Undertakings ==
- KSRTC, Bangalore: Operates out of Southern Karnataka.
- NWKRTC, Hubli: Operates out of North-Western Karnataka except Bijapur district.
- KKRTC, Gulbarga: Operates out of North-Eastern Karnataka and Bijapur district.
- BMTC, Bangalore: Operates in Bangalore Metropolitan Region offering transit service.

== Namma Cargo Logistics and Parcel Services ==
Namma Cargo Logistics and Parcel Services was launched on 26 February 2021. It provides cargo and parcel services on the routes in which the KSRTC, NWKRTC and KKRTC buses travel.

== See also ==
- List of bus depots in Karnataka
- List of bus stations in Karnataka
- Kalyana Karnataka Road Transport Corporation
- Karnataka State Road Transport Corporation
- Bangalore Metropolitan Transport Corporation
