= National Highway 275 (India) =

National highway in India

National Highway 275
- Map of the National Highway in red

Route information
- Length: 367 km (228 mi)

Major junctions
- East end: Bengaluru
- List: NH 150A in Mysuru; NH 766 in Mysuru; NH 75 in Mani; SH 3 in Ramanagara; SH 94 in Channapatna; SH 33 in Maddur; SH 84 in Mandya; SH 79 in Srirangapattana; SH 33 in Mysuru; SH 117 in Mysuru; SH 57 in Bilikere; SH 86 in Hunsur; SH 90 in Hunsur; SH 21 in Periyapatna; SH 91 in Kushalanagar; SH 8 in Suntikoppa; SH 89 in Madikeri; SH 27 in Madikeri; SH 85 in Sullia; SH 55 in Sullia; SH 100 in Puttur; SH 101 in Kabaka
- West end: Bantwal, Karnataka

Location
- Country: India
- States: Karnataka
- Major cities: Bengaluru, Kengeri, Bidadi, Ramanagara, Channapatna, Maddur, Mandya, Srirangapattana, Mysuru, Hunsur, Periyapatna, Bylakuppe, Kushalanagar, Madikeri, Sullia, Puttur and Bantwal

Highway system
- Roads in India; Expressways; National; State; Asian
← NH 48	→ NH 73

National Highway 275 (NH-275), also commonly referred to as Bengaluru–Mysuru access-controlled Expressway, part of the Bengaluru–Mangaluru Economic Corridor (EC-34), is a national highway that starts from Bengaluru and goes through Mysuru as a 6-lane expressway of 119 km (74 mi), and again as 4-lane till Bilikere (towards Madikeri), and ends at Bantwal. This highway connects the coastal city of Mangaluru to Bengaluru. It is also a bypass route for the National Highway 75 (NH-75). The Bengaluru to Mysuru section of this highway was upgraded from 4 to 10 lanes, out of which the 6-lane section is the main elevated access-controlled carriageway and the other 2-lane section on both ends of the carriageway are service roads. It claims to reduce the travel time between Bengaluru and Mysuru from 3 hours to 75 minutes.

Highway Number	Source	Destination	Via	Length (km)
275	Bantwal	Bengaluru	Mysuru	367

== Bengaluru-Mysuru section ==
The Bengaluru–Mysuru Expressway is a 119 km (74 mi) long, 10-lane, tolled elevated expressway. It has been built at a cost of ₹ 8,000 crore and was developed in two phases. Phase-1 of 56 km (35 mi) length connecting Bengaluru and Nidaghatta, and Phase-2 of 61 km (38 mi) connecting Nidaghatta and Mysuru. The foundation stone for the project was laid in March 2018.

=== Status updates ===
- Mar 2018: Foundation stone laid for the project.
- Apr 2018: Contract awarded for Phase-1 to Bhopal-based Dilip Buildcon Limited.
- Mar 2019: Civil work which got stuck due to land acquisition issues to start by April 2019.
- Jul 2020: Work on Phase-1 started in May 2019 and work on Phase-2 started in Dec 2019. Both phase are seeing delay due to COVID-19 related problems, which caused labour shortages and several delays in work. It may see the deadline of January 2022; to get further delayed.
- Dec 2021: Work on Phase-1 completed up to 83% and Phase II completed up to 73%. The expressway is expected to become operational by October 2022.
- Feb 2023: The expressway is at its final stages of construction work, and will be inaugurated by Prime Minister Narendra Modi on 11 March 2023.
- March 2023: The expressway section was inaugurated by Prime Minister Narendra Modi on 12 March 2023.

== Gallery ==
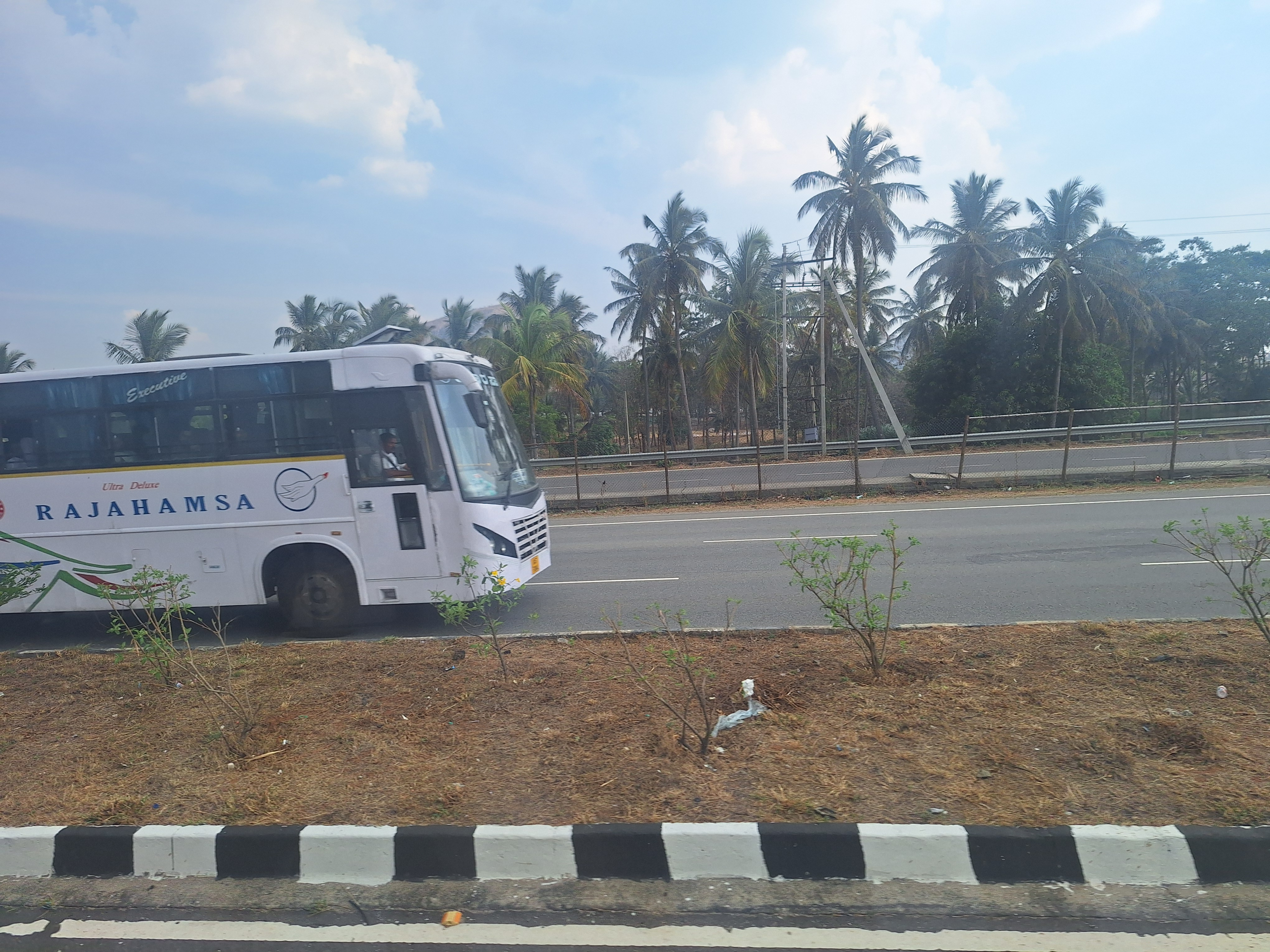
Rajahamsa Executive Class bus in Bangalore-Mysuru Expressway

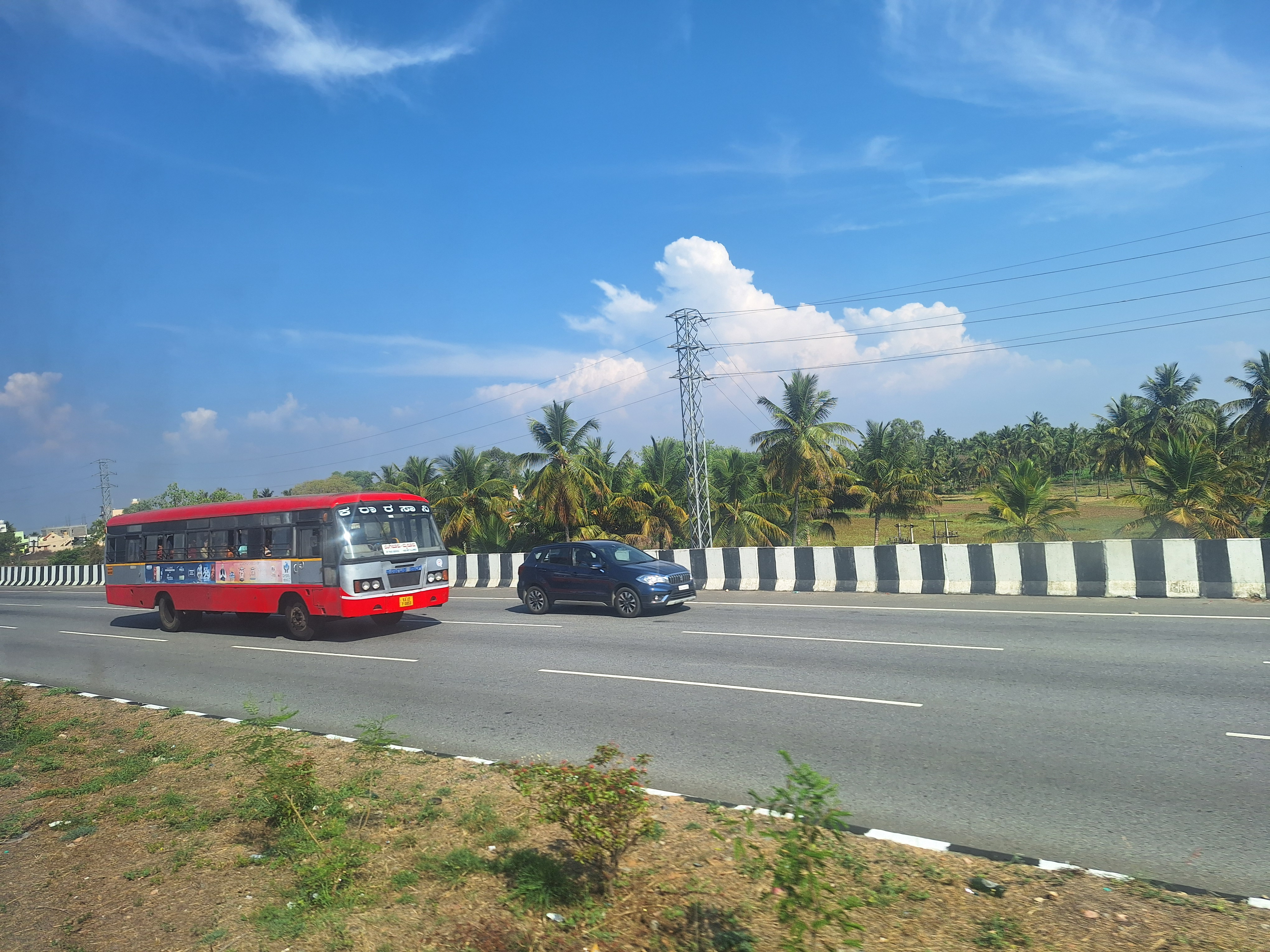
Karnataka Sarigebus in Bangalore-Mysuru Expressway

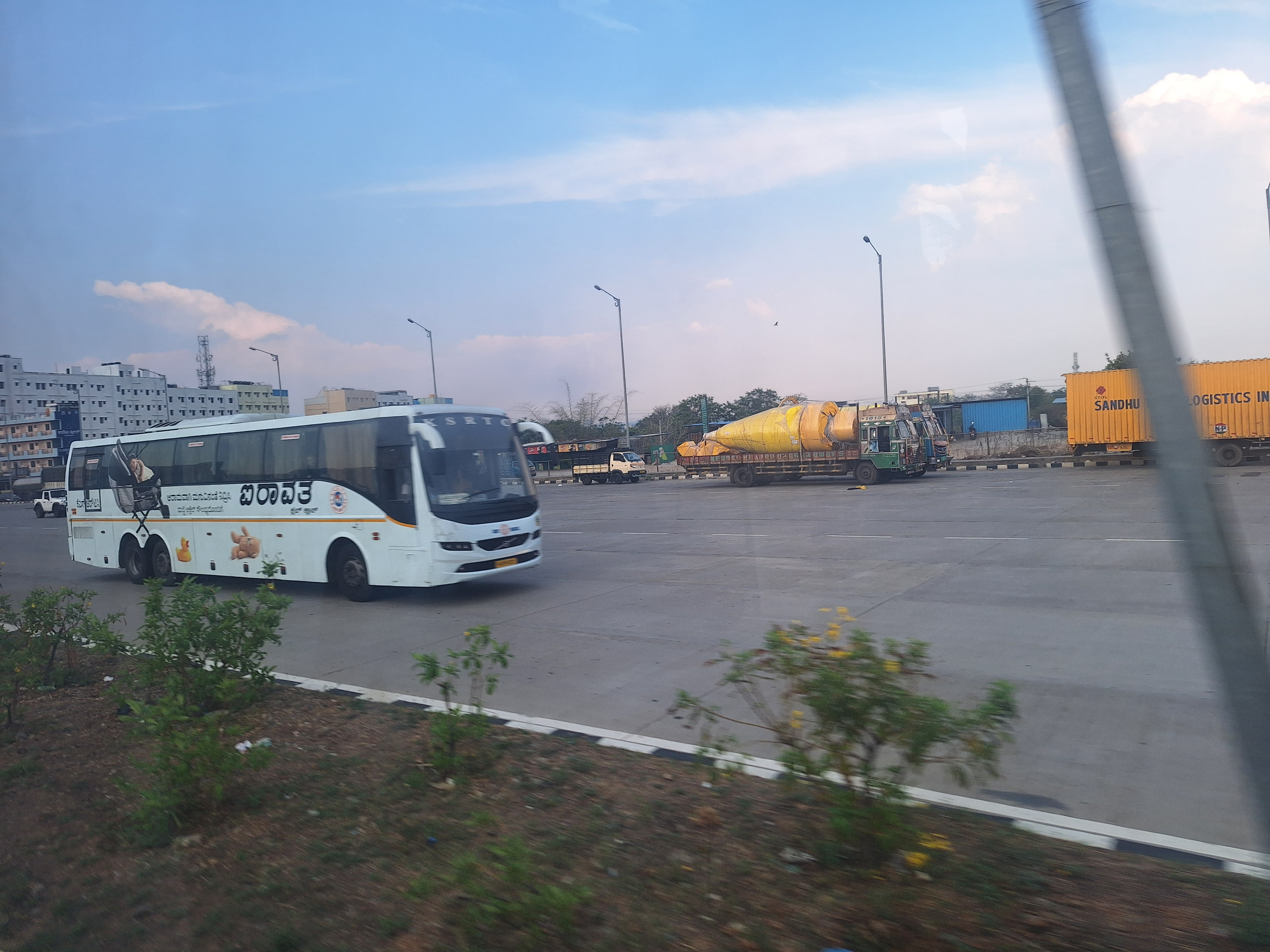
Airavat Club Class Volvo B11R bus near Kaniminike Toll Plaza

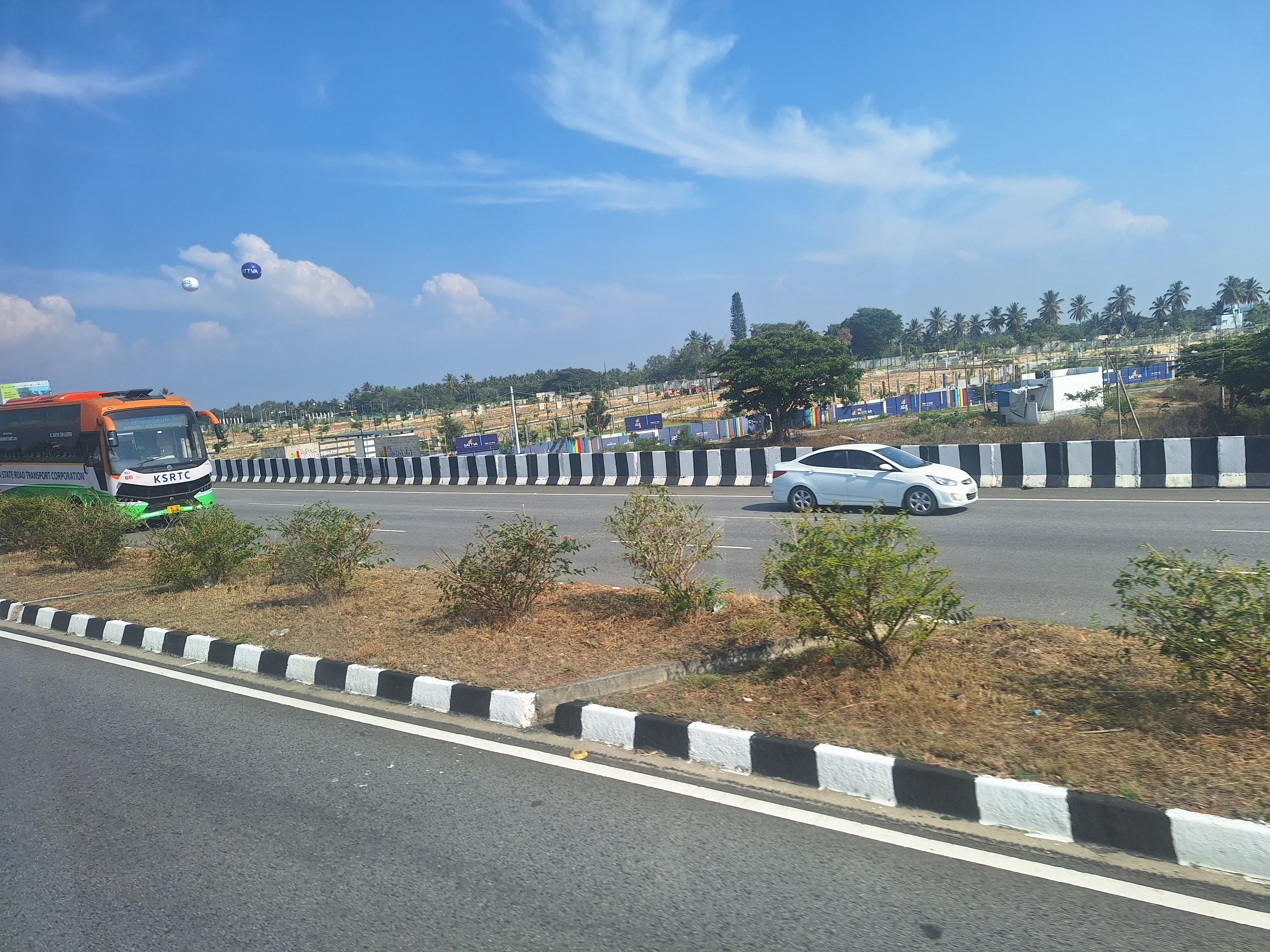
KSRTC ac sleeper cum seater bus in Bangalore-Mysuru Expressway

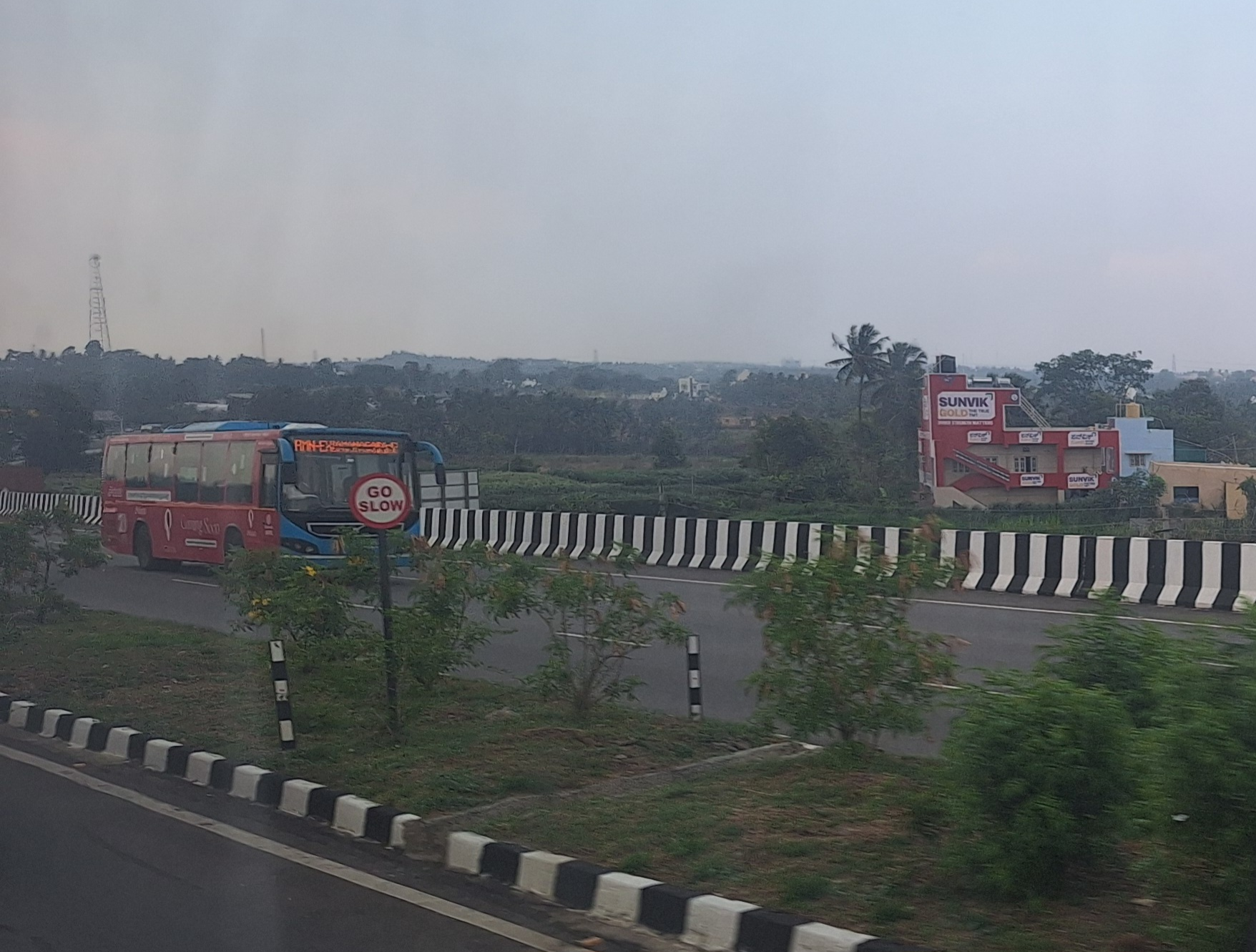
Vajra Vistara heading towards Ramanagara

== See also ==
- Bangalore-Mysore Infrastructure Corridor (NICE Road)
- National Highway 66 (India)
- National Highway 75 (India)
- National Highway 73 (India)
- National Highway 169 (India)
- National Highway 206 (India)
- National Highway 52 (India)
- Ghat Roads
