= Flybus =

Public bus service in India

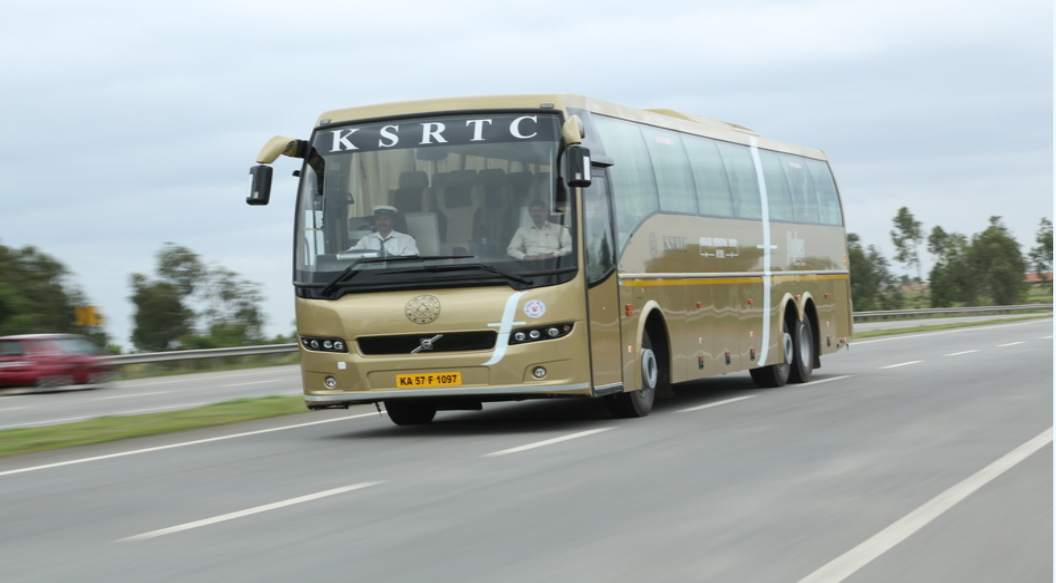
- Founded: 13 August 2013
- Locale: Karnataka
- Service type: Airport bus
- Routes: Kempegowda International Airport (Bangalore) to Mysore, Madikeri and Davangere
- Operator: Karnataka State Road Transport Corporation

Flybus is a premium airport bus service run by the Karnataka State Road Transport Corporation connecting Kempegowda International Airport (KIA) directly to major cities in Karnataka.

== Description ==
It was launched on 13th August, 2013 by then Chief Minister of Karnataka,Siddaramaiah. Its initial route was to Mysore

It is a Volvo semi-sleeper bus which operates from Kempegowda International Airport (KIA) to various city of Karnataka like Madikeri, Mysore and Davanagere.

== Amenities ==
It is an AC luxury bus service with 2+2 reclining seats with chemical toilets, Wi-Fi, and an auto hand wash system built on a multi-axle Volvo B9R (Old) or Volvo B11R (New) chassis with a golden livery.

On 12 November 2025, KSRTC started to offer complimentary Nandini snack kits.

== Routes ==
| Sl.No | Origin | Terminus | Via | Reference |
|---|---|---|---|---|
| 1 | Kempegowda International Airport | Mysore | Hebbal, Channapatna, Mandya | |
| 2 | Kempegowda International Airport | Madikeri | Hebbal, Mandya, Mysore, Hunsur, Kushalnagar | |
| 3 | Kempegowda International Airport | Davangere | Hebbal, Peenya, Chitradurga | |
| 4 | Kempegowda International Airport | Kozhikode | Mysore, Hunsur,Ponnampet,Kutta,Mananthawadi,Kalpetta, | |

== Gallery ==
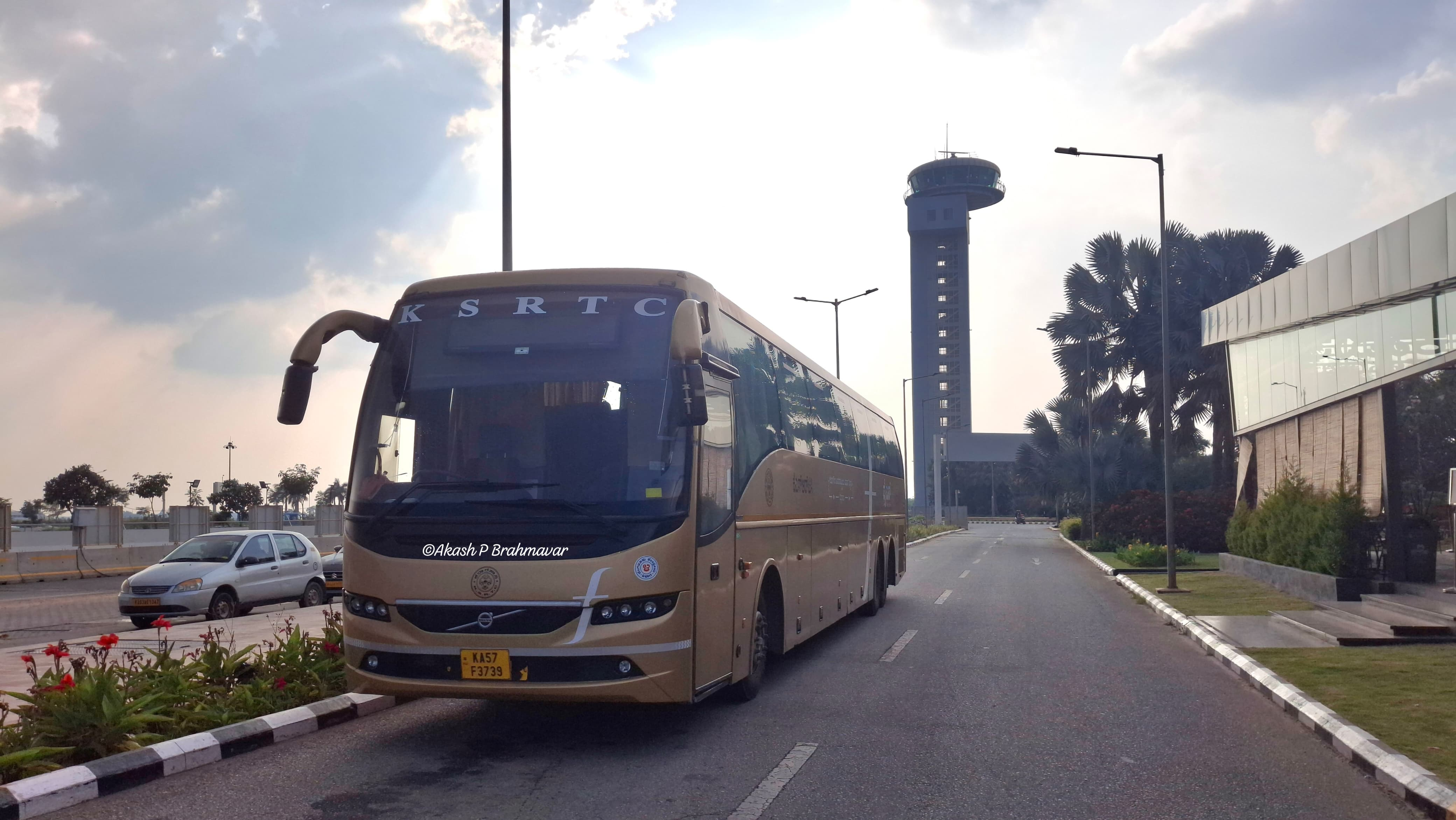
KSRTC Flybus Volvo B11R BS-IV (front)

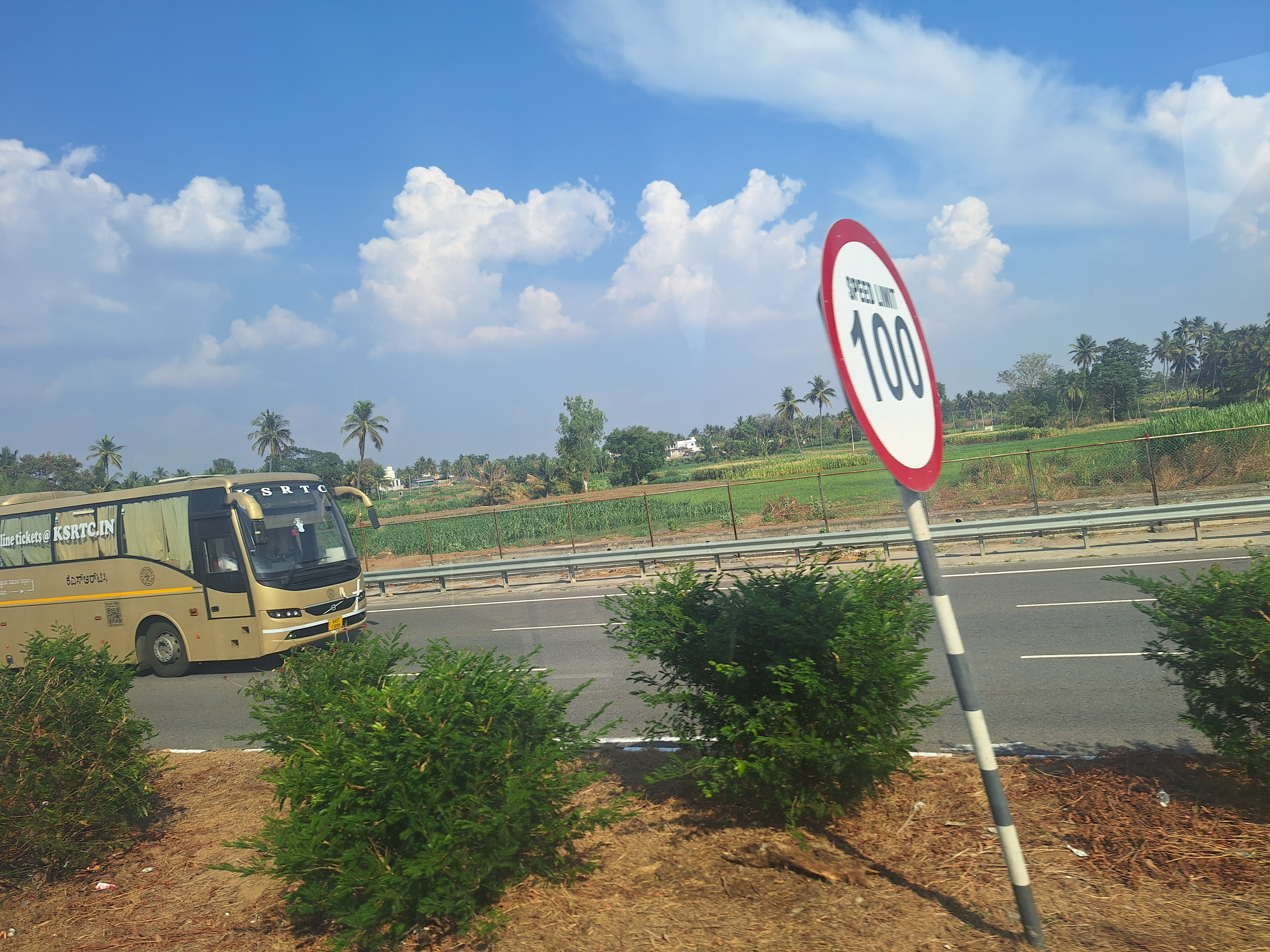
Flybus in Bangalore-Mysuru Expressway

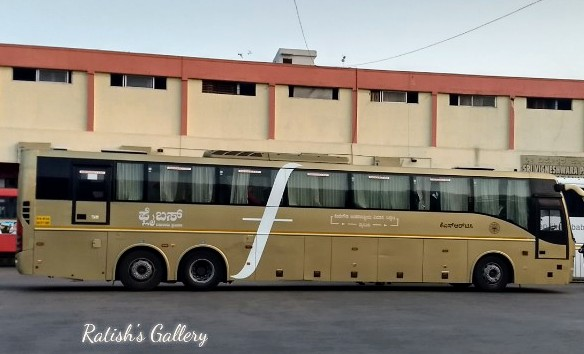
Fly Bus at KSRTC Mysuru Sub Urban Bus Station in Mysore

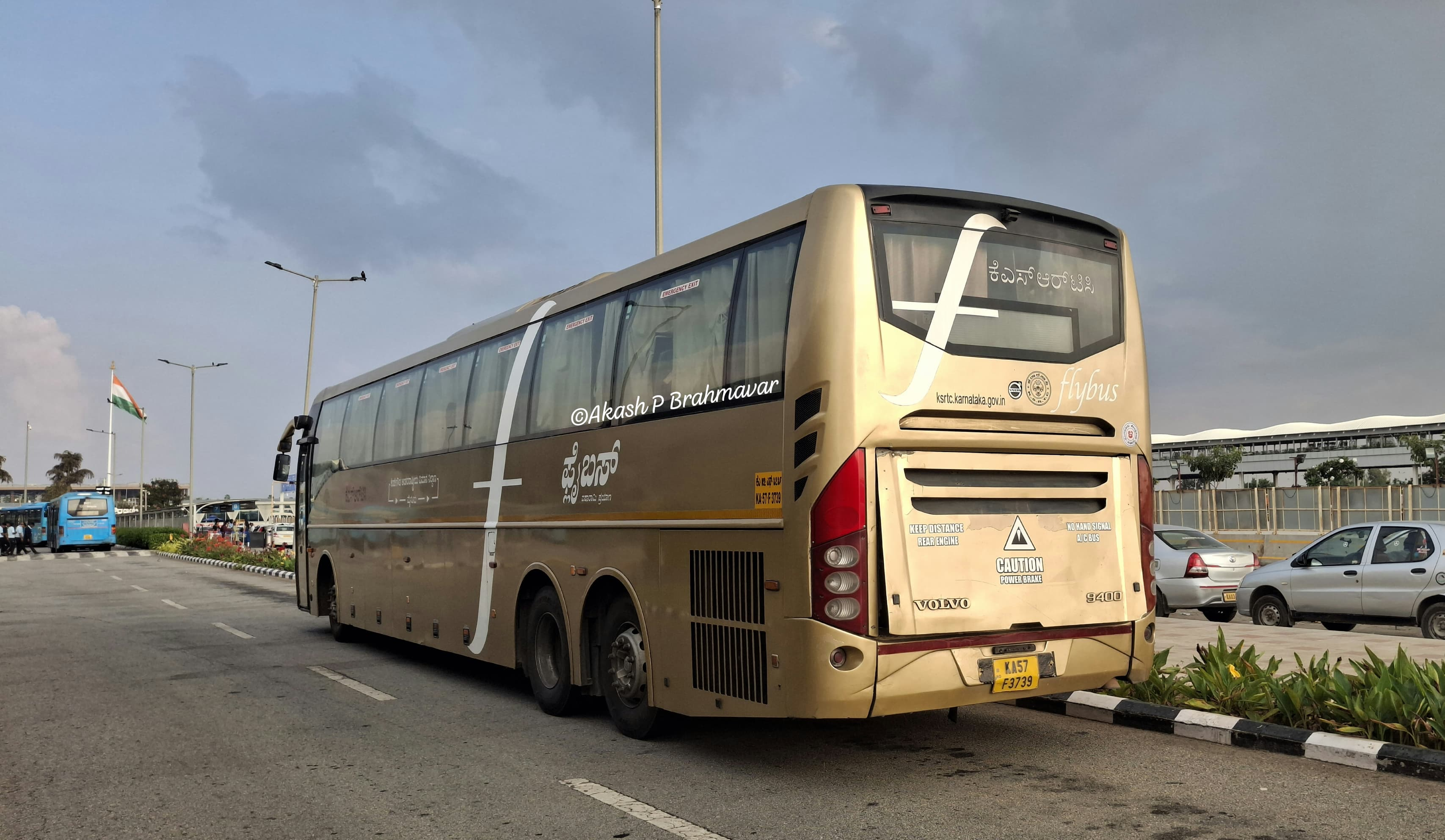
KSRTC owned Volvo B11R BS-IV AC Semisleeper parked at Kempegowda International Airport

== See also ==
- Airavat Club Class
- Vayu Vajra
