= Airavat Club Class =

Public bus service in India

Airavat Club class
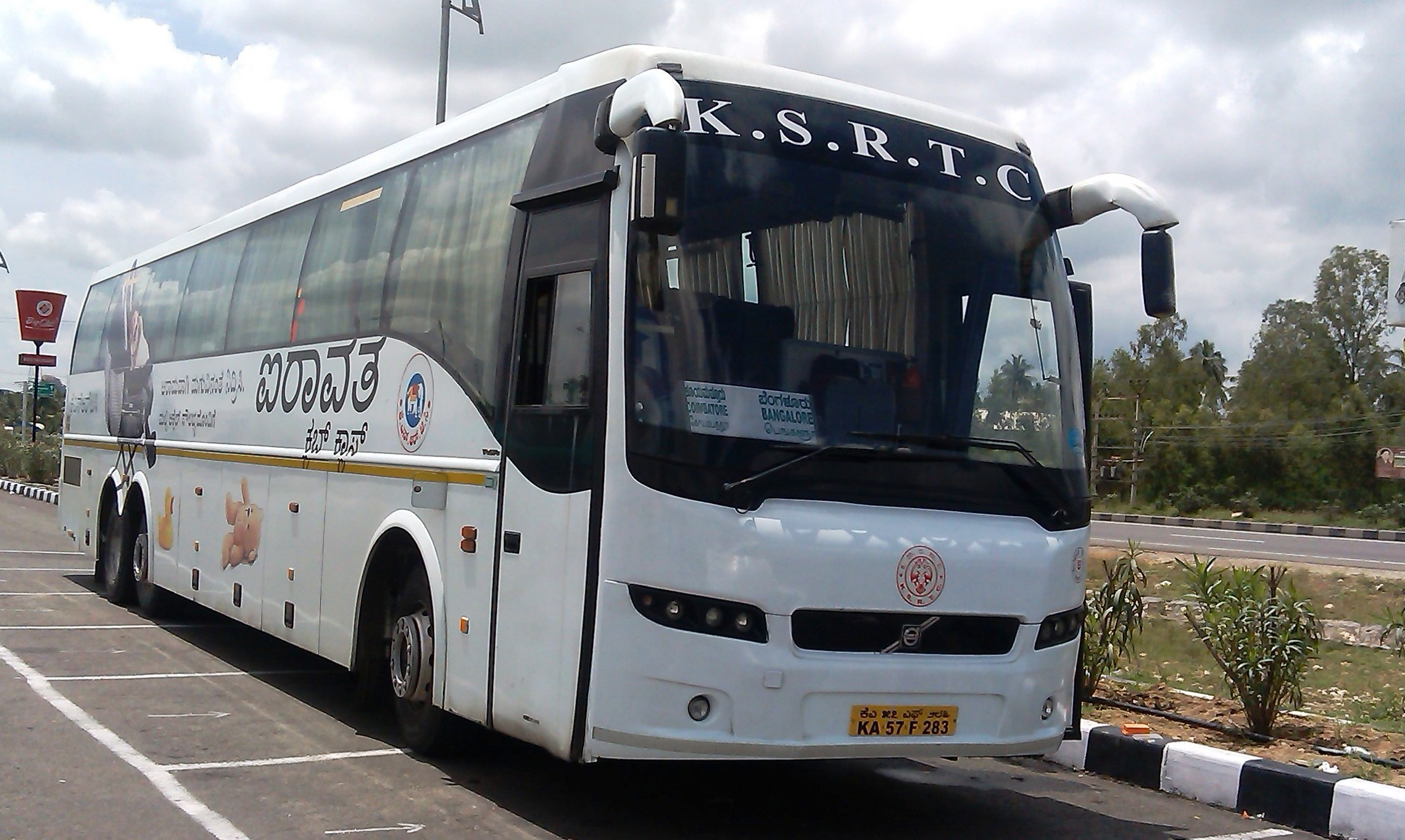
- Parent: Karnataka State Road Transport Corporation,North Western Karnataka Road Transport Corporation
- Founded: 16 May 2012
- Locale: Karnataka
- Service area: Karnataka,Maharashtra,Kerala,Tamil Nadu,Andhra Pradesh,Telangana,Goa and Pondicherry
- Service type: Volvo,Scania bus coaches and Inter-city,Inter-State
- Fleet: 5904
- Operator: Karnataka State Road Transport Corporation,North Western Karnataka Road Transport Corporation( all under Government of Karnataka)
- successor: Airavat Class 2.0
- predecessor: Airavat Class

Airavat Club Class (transl. White elephant club-like experience) is a series of premium Inter-City AC-Seater public bus owned by the Government of Karnataka's public road transport department KSRTC, in Bengaluru, Karnataka, India. They are air conditioned B9R,B11R,Scania AB and Mercedes-Benz buses coloured white with livery featuring a distinctive "Airavat" elephant logo and blue and gold graphic accents.

== Timeline ==
It was launched on 16 May 2012 by then Transport Minister R. Ashoka.

It is a successor to Airavat service, which is bi-axle. These buses consist of Multi Axle Volvo B9R and B11R

In 2011 Mercedes Benz buses where added to this fleet.

In July 2012 new specialized variants, Airavat Bliss (with chemical toilets and pantry) and Airavat Superia (with toilets), were introduced, which was later merged to Airavat Club.

In June 2015 The Airavat Diamond Class (using Scania multi-axle buses) was launched, later merging back into the Club Class brand.

On October 30, 2024, the successor to this class, Airavat Club Class 2.0, was launched by Chief Minister Siddaramaiah, featuring the advanced 15-metre Volvo 9600 multi-axle series.

== Description ==
It is a premium service known for its high level of comfort on long-distance routes. It has a 2+2 seating layout. It connects major cities across South India, with frequent services to the following:

- Karnataka: Bengaluru Mysuru, Mangaluru,Kundapura, Hubballi and Belagavi(Both operated by North Western Karnataka Road Transport Corporation).
- Interstate: Hyderabad, Chennai, Tirupati, Goa, and Mantralayam.

B-9R was launched initially; B11R buses were launched later in 2017.

== Gallery ==
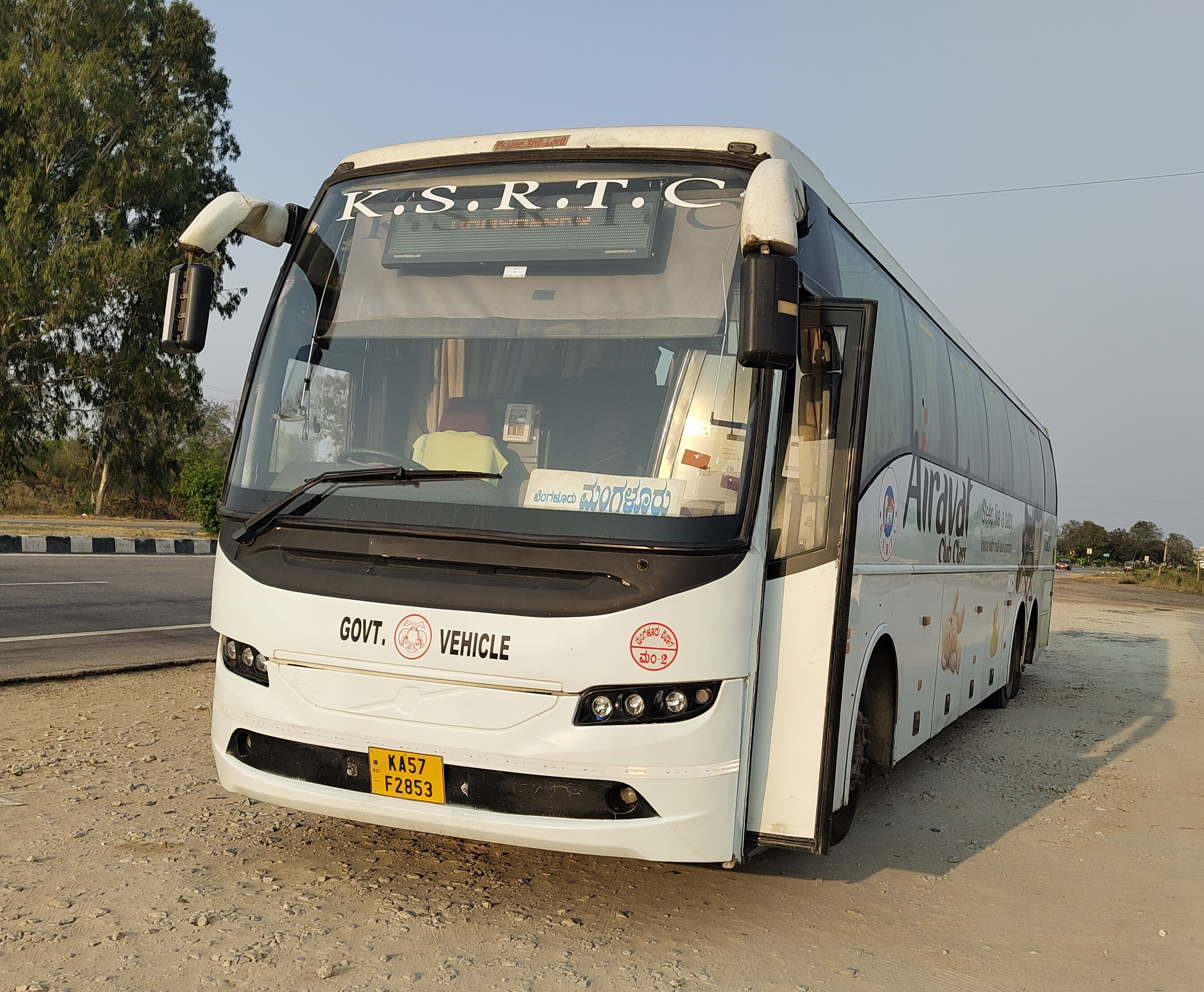
B11R Airavat Club Class

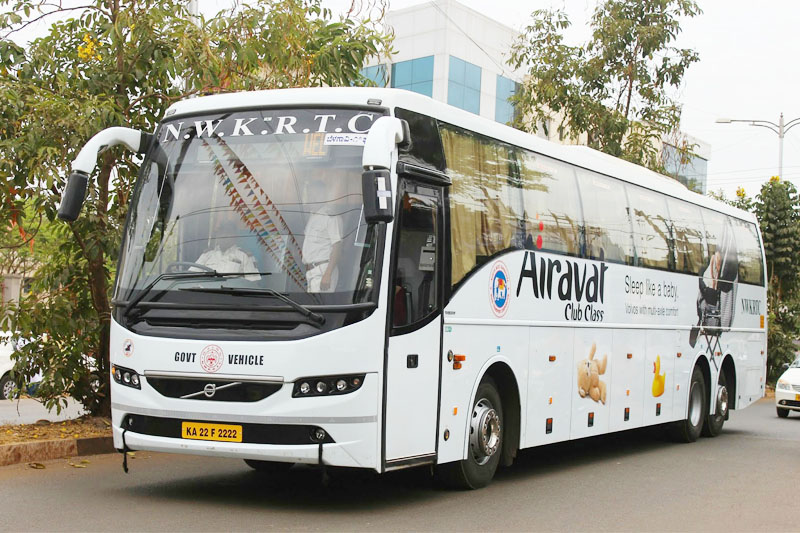
NWKRTC'S Airavat-CLub Class

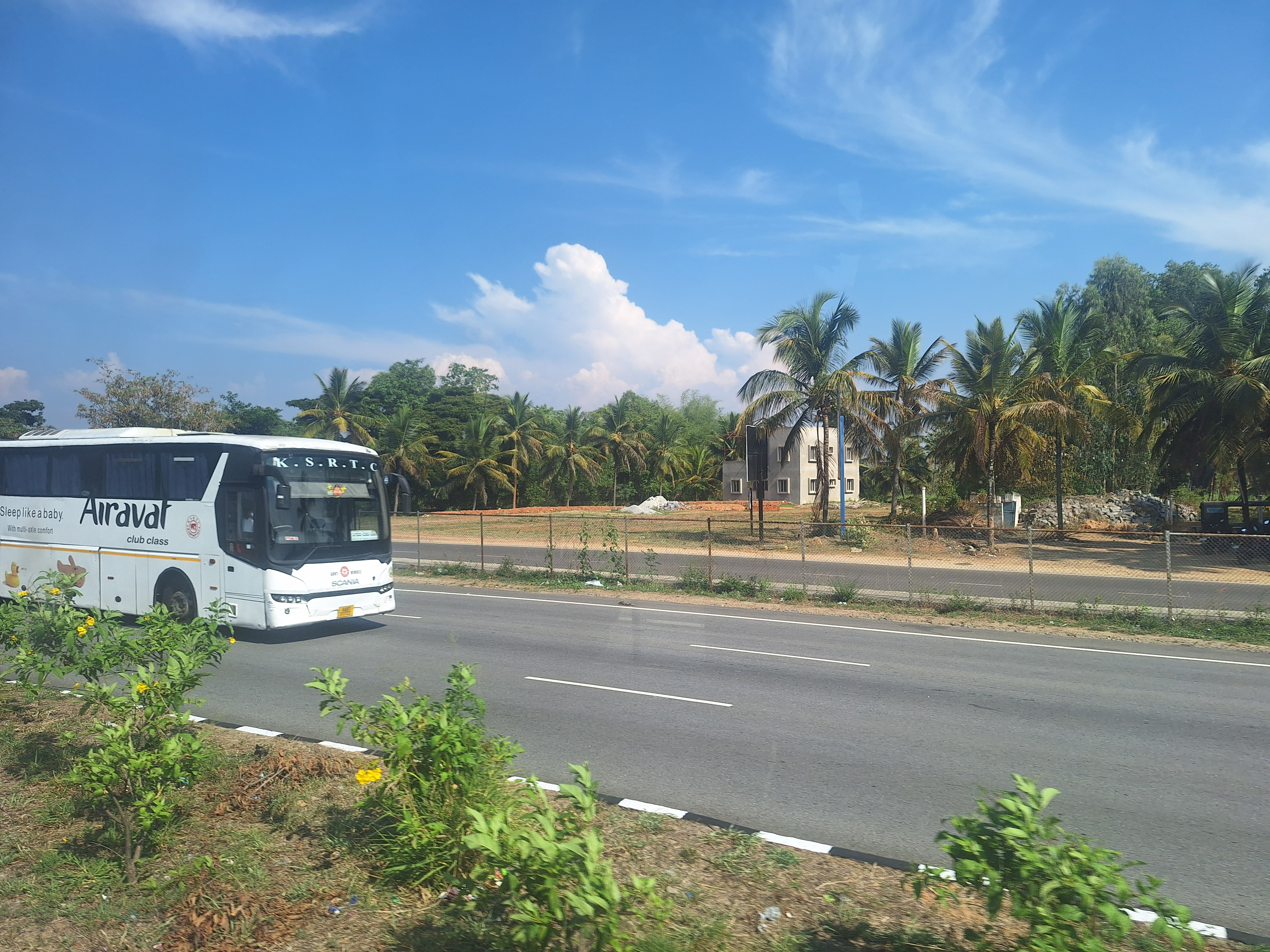
Airavat Club Class Scania bus in Bangalore-Mysuru Expressway

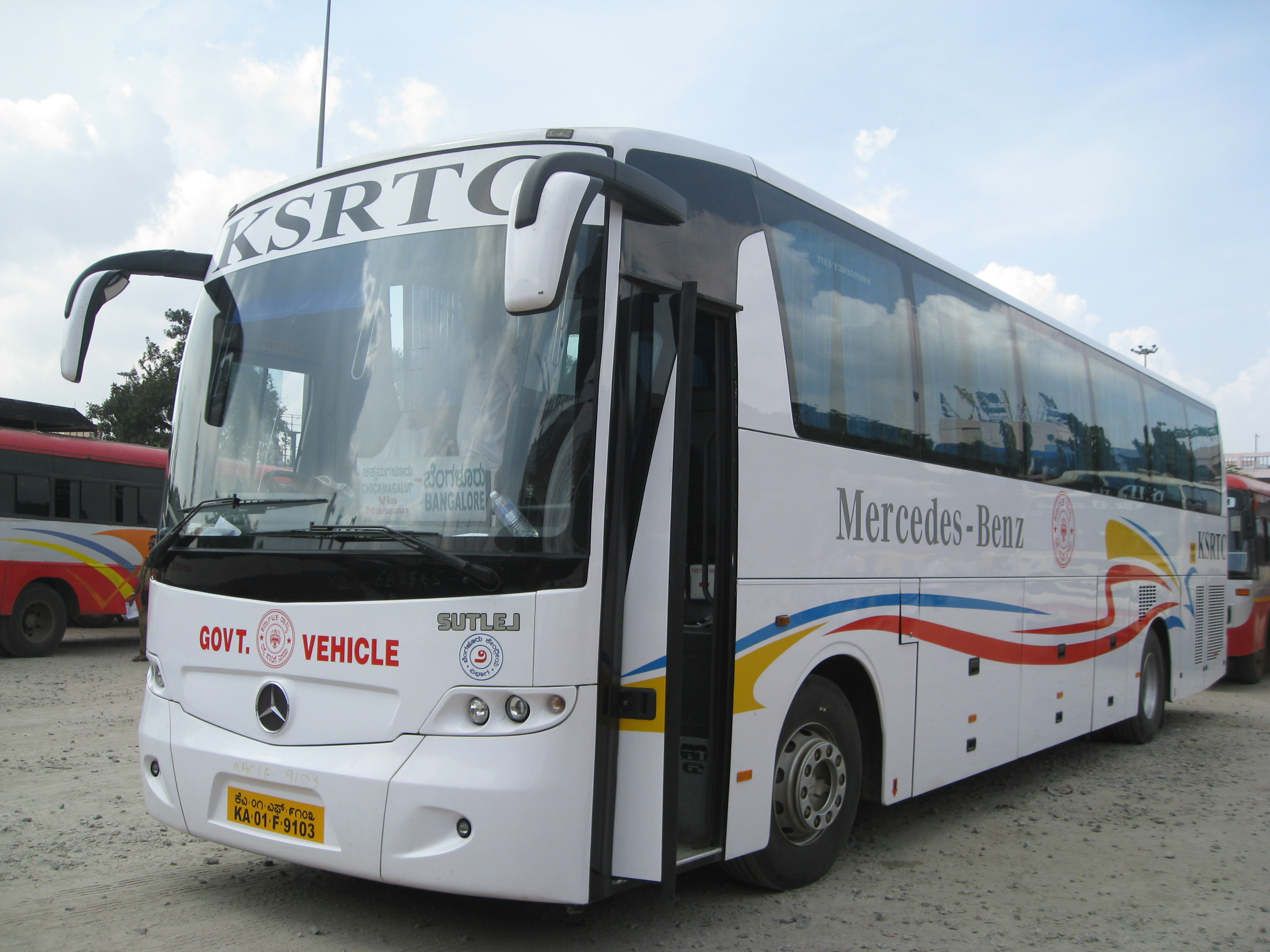
KSRTC-Mercedes-Benz

== See also ==
- Flybus
- Ambaari Utsav Class
