= Metro Feeder(BMTC) =

Public bus service in India

Metro Feeder
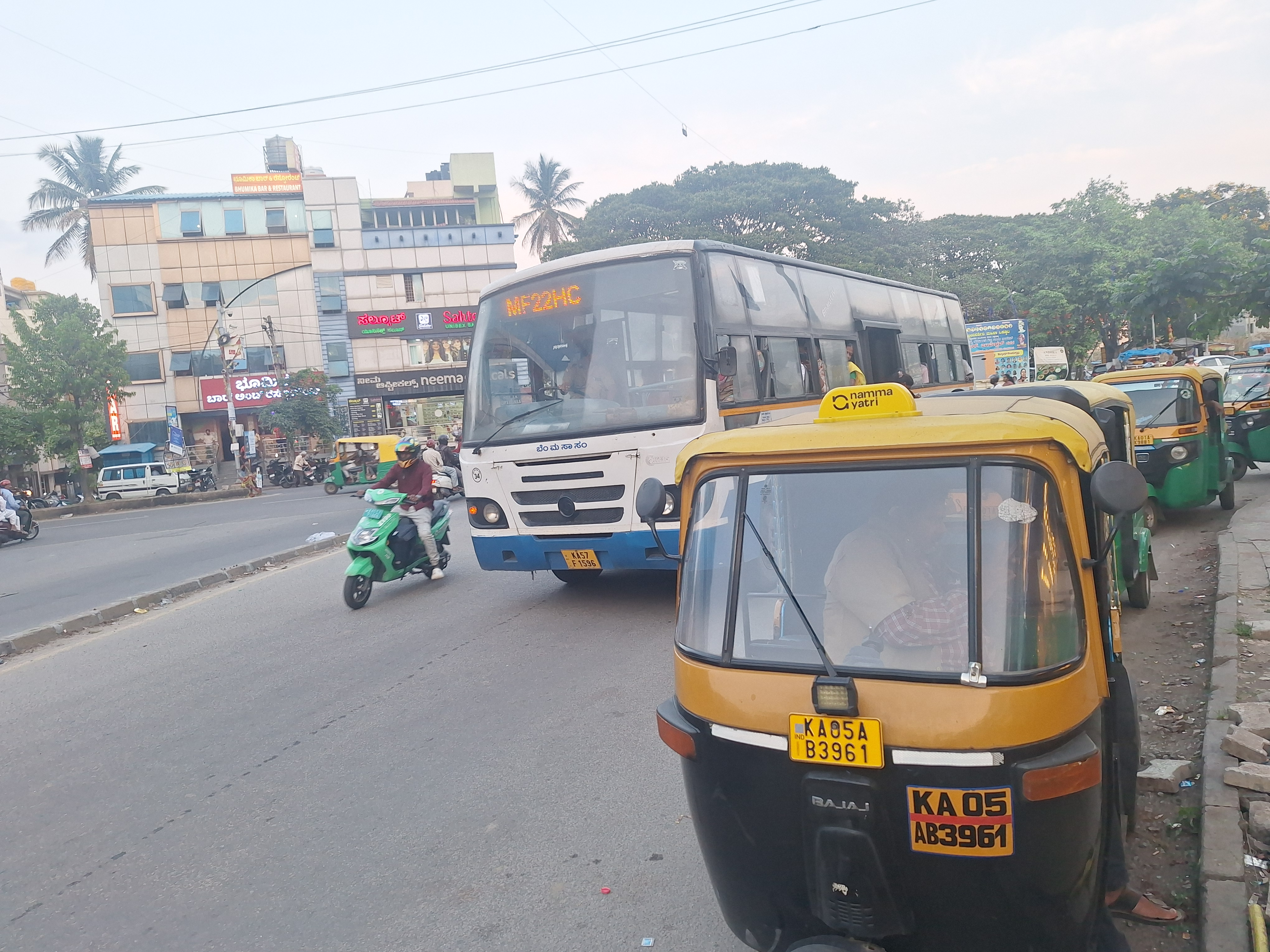
- Metro feeder Midi bus(On Bengaluru Sarige Livery) in Vijaya bank layout.
- Parent: Bengaluru Metropolitan Transport Corporation
- Locale: Bengaluru
- Service area: Bengaluru Urban district,Bengaluru Rural district,parts of Ramanagara district
- Service type: Non-AC,AC Seater Intracity connecting with major Namma Metro Stations
- Fleet: Uses fleet of Bengaluru Sarige,Astra,Vajra
- Daily ridership: 1.5 Lakhs
- Fuel type: Diesel,electric bus
- Operator: Bengaluru Metropolitan Transport Corporation (under Government of Karnataka)
- Website: mybmtc.karnataka.gov.in/en

The Metro Feeder (with prefix MF) is a series of Economic Non-AC or AC Feeder Bus service operated by BMTC across localities and villages of Greater Bangalore. It connects localities with major Namma Metro Stations.It uses Fleet of Bengaluru Sarige,Astra,Vajra. It consists of 2+2 seat layout .

== Description ==
These buses are meant to improve last mile connectivity to localities from Namma Metro Stations.Most of these buses uses fleet of Bengaluru Sarige's Midi buses.. The first Vajra Metro feeder was launced on route from Krishnarajapura metro station to Central Silk Board metro station.

== Routes ==
=== AC Metro Feeder Routes (Uses Vajra bus) ===
| Sl.No | Route Number | Origin | Terminus | Via |
|---|---|---|---|---|
| 1 | MF-1C | KR Puram Metro Station | Central Silk Board | Mahadevapura Ring Road, EMC2, Doddanekundi, Marathahalli Bridge (Kalamandir), Kadubeesanahalli, Eco Space, Bellandur, Sarjapura Ring Road Junction, Agara Junction, HSR BDA Complex |
| 2 | MF-1D | KR Puram Metro Station | Sarjapur | Mahadevapura Ring Road, EMC2, Doddanekundi, Marathahalli Bridge (Kalamandir), Kadubeesanahalli, Eco Space, Bellandur, Sarjapura Ring Road Junction, Bellandur Gate, Doddakannalli, Kodati Gate, Dommasandra, Sompura |
| 3 | MF 6 | Swami Vivekananda Road metro station | Central Silk Board | Indiranagar Police Station, Doopanahalli, Domlur Bridge, Sony Signal, Koramangala Water Tank, Madiwala |

== Welfares and schemes ==
=== 'Shakti Scheme' free bus service for women ===
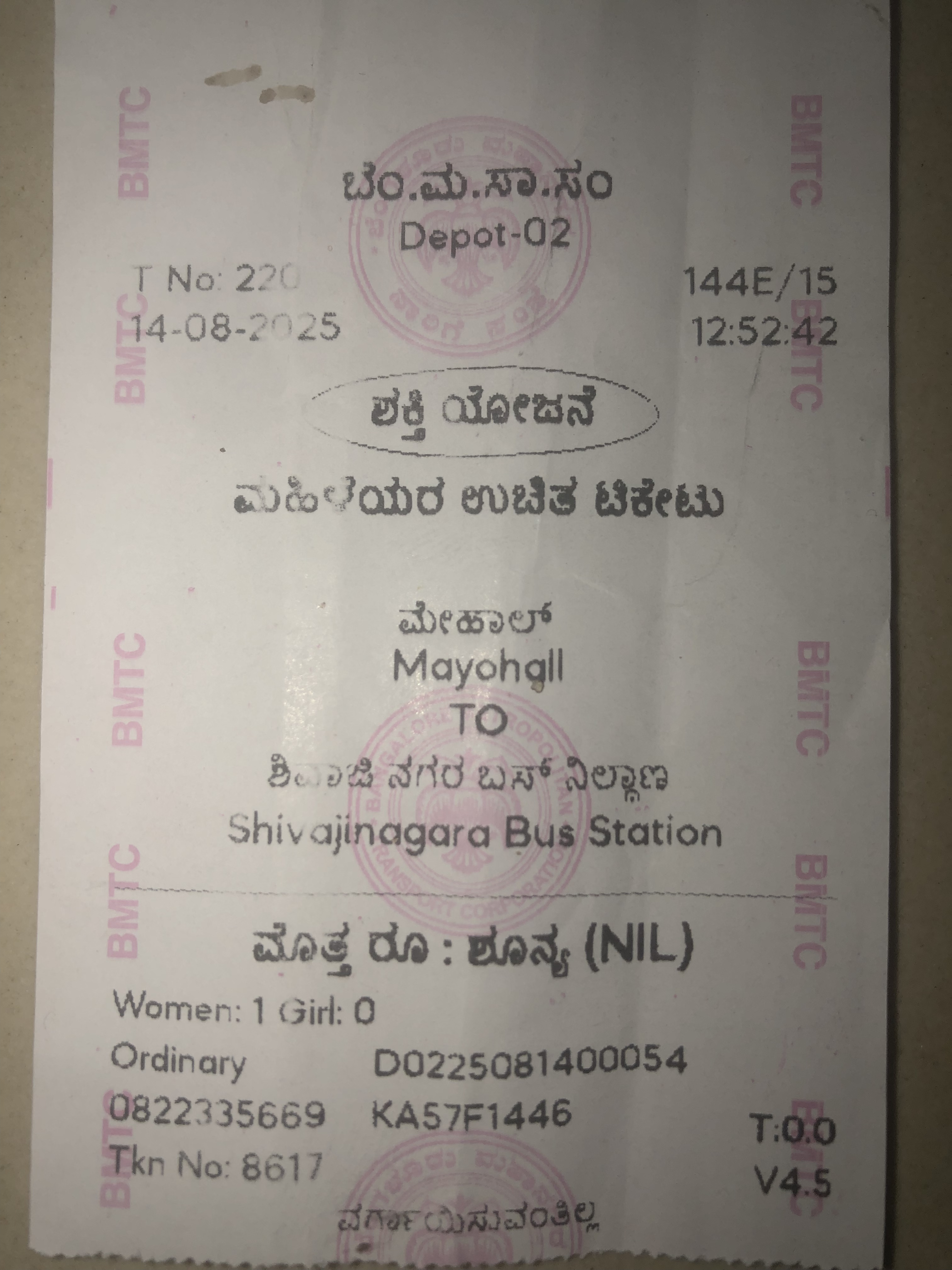
Non-Ac bus Shakthi Yojana Ticket

'Shakti Scheme' was announced by the Second Siddaramaiah ministry on 2 June 2023. It started on 11 June 2023, providing free-of-charge bus service to Karnataka-domiciled women. Beneficiaries show their government-issued photo identification and address proof for the first three months. Bus conductors issue them zero-fare tickets. Thereafter, beneficiaries obtain Shakti smartcards (named after the name of the scheme) through an application submitted via the government's Seva Sindhu website.

==== Terms and conditions of the scheme ====
- The scheme will apply to all four Road Transport Corporations in the state (KSRTC, BMTC, NWKRTC and KKRTC).
- Bengaluru Sarige and Astra Metro Feeders are part of this scheme.
- Women can travel for free only on bus services within the state. Bus services to destinations outside Karnataka will be outside the scheme's purview even if women travel within the state. For example, a woman travelling to Mangaluru in Karnataka i.e., within the state on an Udupi-Kasaragod bus service which is an interstate service to Kasaragod in neighbouring Kerala, will have to buy a ticket.
- The scheme will not apply to luxury buses (Vajra Metro feeders)
- Half of the seats on BMTC ordinary and express buses will be reserved for men. Luxury, AC and interstate buses as well as BMTC buses will be exempted from this.
- The government will reimburse the BMTC based on the distance women travel.

=== Free bus passes for students ===
In June 2026 Karnataka government under the chief ministry of D.K. Shivakumar announced free buses for students studying in Karnataka from primary school to postgraduate level and border areas within 20 km of Karnataka border. It is free for both boys and girls.

- Only Bengaluru Sarige and Astra Metro Feeders are part of this scheme.

== Gallery ==
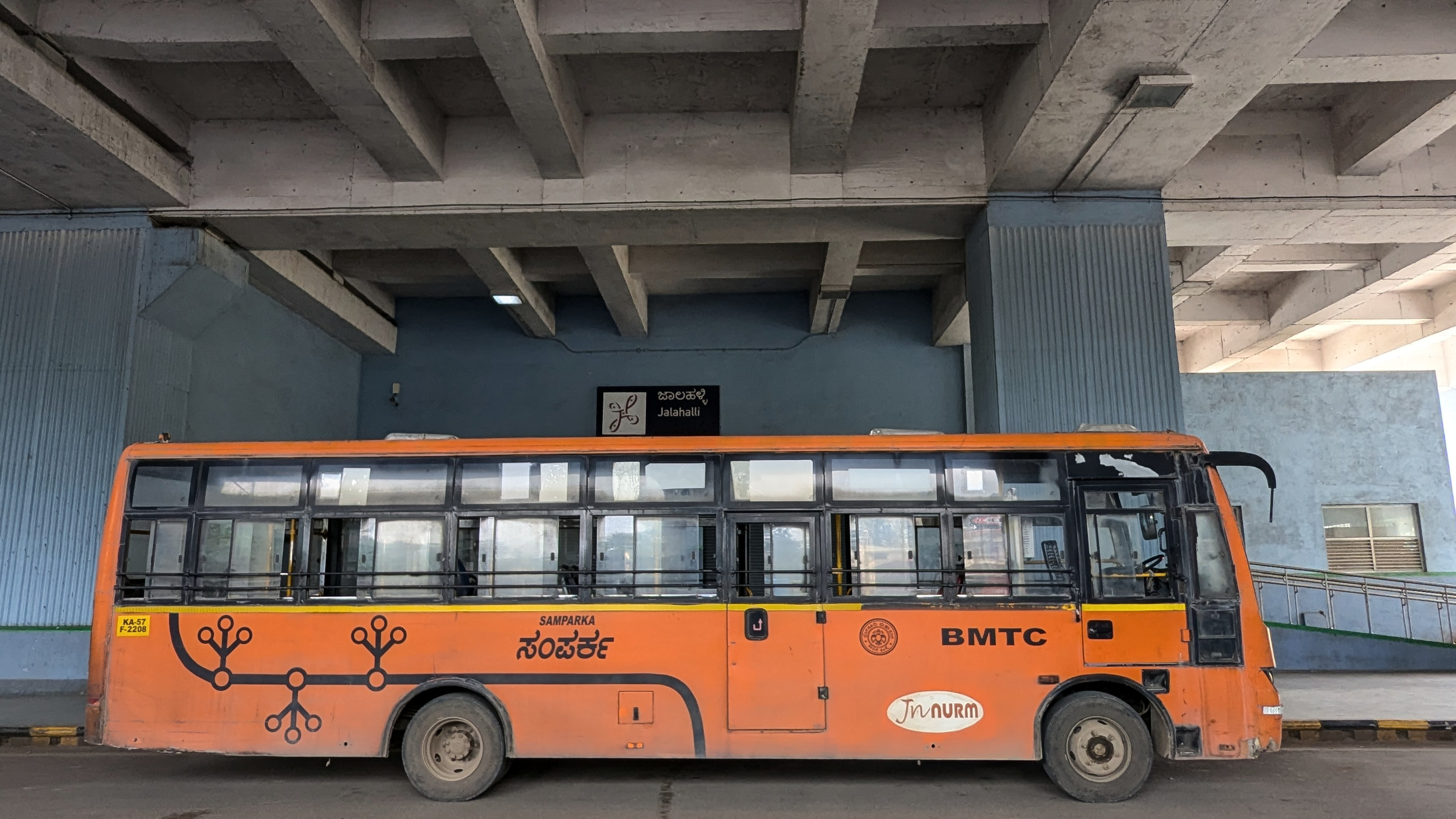
BMTC Midi MF Bus at Jalahalli metro station in old samparka sarige

== See also ==
- List of Namma Metro stations
- Bengaluru Sarige
- Vajra
