= Friends of BMTC =

Volunteer-led public transport awareness initiative in Bengaluru, India

- Formation: 2022
- Founder: Amogh A, Yathish Kumar S, Siddarth S
- Type: Volunteer group
- Purpose: Public transport awareness and commuter assistance
- Headquarters: Bengaluru, Karnataka, India
- Region served: Bengaluru
- Methods: Social media outreach, commuter support

Friends of BMTC (FoB) is a volunteer-driven civic initiative based in Bengaluru, Karnataka, India. The group promotes the use of BMTC buses and assists commuters with information on routes and services through social media and online communities.

== History ==
Friends of BMTC was founded in 2022 by three Bengaluru-based public transport enthusiasts: Amogh A, Yathish Kumar S and Siddarth S. The founders created a Telegram community to help commuters navigate BMTC routes more easily, responding to questions and simplifying route information. The initiative soon grew into a city-wide commuter support platform, gaining media attention for its grassroots approach to mobility assistance.

== Objectives ==
The stated objectives of Friends of BMTC include:

- Encouraging the use of public transport in Bengaluru.
- Providing accessible explanations of BMTC routes, services and connections.
- Helping commuters with trip planning and interchange guidance through online support.
- Highlighting connectivity gaps and service issues raised by passengers.
- Promoting sustainable and affordable mobility.

== Activities ==
=== Information sharing ===
Friends of BMTC shares route explanations, service updates, new route launches and frequency details through posts, graphics and videos. The group aims to simplify BMTC routes for new and regular users alike.

=== Commuter assistance ===
The volunteer team manages a Telegram group where commuters ask about routes, timings and interchanges. Volunteers respond with bus suggestions, live travel tips and alternative options.

=== Documentation projects ===
Friends of BMTC also works on:

- compiling route-level information,
- mapping corridors,
- and explaining lesser-known routes.

These documentation efforts help commuters and serve as a reference for long-term public transport research.

=== Awareness campaigns ===
The group runs online campaigns encouraging metro–bus integration, exploring lesser-known routes, and shifting to sustainable transport modes.

=== Engagement with BMTC ===
While independent, Friends of BMTC is often mentioned in media as part of the active commuter community that informally supports BMTC's communication efforts. Volunteers assist by broadcasting official announcements and sharing commuter feedback.

== Impact ==
Friends of BMTC has been recognised in media reports as one of the citizen-led initiatives improving public accessibility to BMTC information. Its route explanations and community guidance have made the bus network easier to understand for thousands of commuters. The initiative has popularised lesser-known routes, highlighted service improvements, and supported modal shift toward buses. Its posts routinely reach thousands of commuters and have contributed to better awareness of connectivity options across the city.

== Social media and online presence ==
Friends of BMTC maintains an active presence on:

- Telegram (route enquiry group),
- X (formerly Twitter),
- Instagram,
- YouTube.

== See also ==
- Bengaluru Metropolitan Transport Corporation
- Public transport in Bengaluru
- Karnataka State Road Transport Corporation
- Transport in Karnataka
- Urban transport in India
