= Bengaluru Metropolitan Transport Corporation =

Transport corporation of Karnataka, India

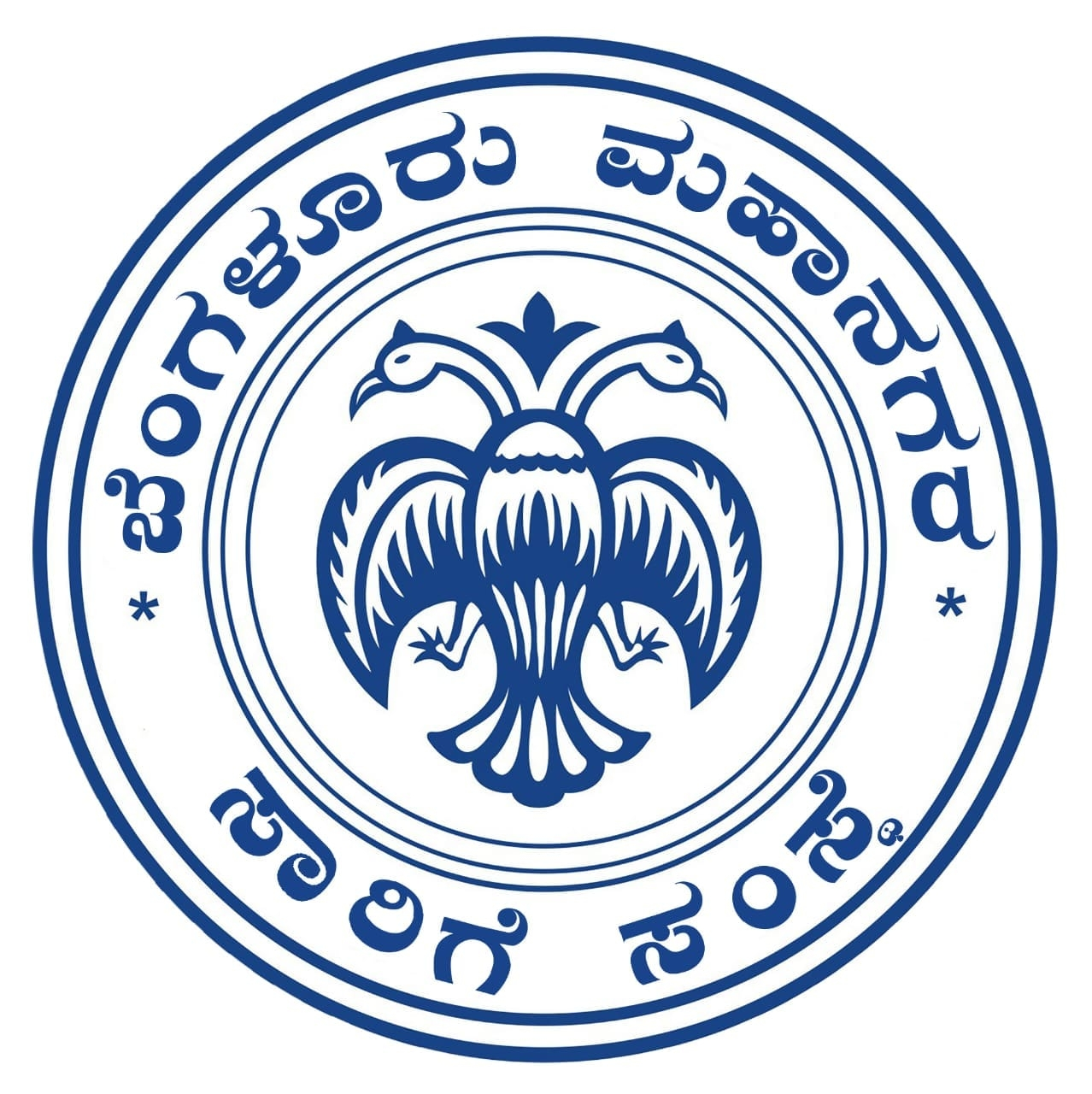
- Formerly: Bangalore Transport Service (1948–1961); Bangalore Transport Service (1961–1997), as part of Karnataka State Road Transport Corporation; Bangalore Metropolitan Transport Corporation (1997–2014)
- Parent: Karnataka State Road Transport Corporation
- Founded: August 15, 1997; 29 years ago as Bangalore Metropolitan Transport Corporation; November 1, 2014; 11 years ago renamed Bengaluru Metropolitan Transport Corporation
- Commenced operation: August 15, 1997; 29 years ago
- Headquarters: BMTC Central Office, Sarige Sadana, Kengal Hanumanthaiah Road, Shantinagara, Bengaluru, Bengaluru Urban district, Karnataka, India
- Locale: Majorly 25 km outward from the boundaries of Bengaluru City, covering most of Bengaluru Urban district, parts of Bengaluru North district, Bengaluru South district, and select destinations in Chikkaballapura district, Ramanagara district and Tumakuru district
- Service area: Majorly within the Bengaluru Metropolitan Region and select destinations in neighbouring districts
- Alliance: Karnataka's Road Transport Undertakings
- Routes: 5,729
- Hubs: • Kempegowda Bus Station, Majestic • Shivajinagar • K. R. Market
- Depots: 50
- Fleet: More than 6955 vehicles, including over 1,700 electric buses (as of July 2026)
- Daily ridership: Approximately 4.8 million daily (October 2025)
- Fuel type: Diesel, Electric battery
- Operator: Government of Karnataka
- Managing Director: Raghunandan Murthy, IAS
- Website: mybmtc.karnataka.gov.in

Bengaluru Metropolitan Transport Corporation (BMTC), formerly Bangalore Metropolitan Transport Corporation, is a state-owned public road transport corporation serving the Indian city of Bengaluru. It is wholly owned by the Government of Karnataka and operates within the Bengaluru Metropolitan Region. As of October 2025, BMTC's operating fleet exceeded 7,000 buses, of which more than 1,700 were electric, and the corporation reported average daily ridership of around 4.8 million passengers, among the highest of any city bus operator in India. Despite this scale, BMTC has in recent years reported large annual operating losses and has come to depend heavily on state reimbursements for the free-travel schemes it administers, a tension discussed further in § Finances below.

== History ==
=== Foundation ===
The Mysore Government Road Transport Department was inaugurated on 12 September 1948 with 120 buses. The transport department of the princely state of Mysore administered it until 1961.

=== Corporatization ===
It was subsequently converted into an independent corporation under Section 3 of the Road Transport Corporation Act, 1950, on 1 August 1961. Following the conversion, all assets and liabilities of the Mysore Government Road Transport Department were transferred to the newly formed Mysore State Road Transport Corporation.

=== Merger ===
On 1 October 1961, the Bangalore Transport Service was merged into the corporation.

=== Renaming ===
On 1 November 1973, following the renaming of Mysore State as Karnataka, the corporation was renamed Karnataka State Road Transport Corporation.

=== Bifurcation ===
- On 15 August 1997, the Bangalore Metropolitan Transport Corporation was carved out of the Karnataka State Road Transport Corporation to serve the Bangalore Metropolitan Region.
- On 1 November 1997, North Western Karnataka Road Transport Corporation was bifurcated to serve north-western Karnataka.
- On 15 August 2000, Kalyana Karnataka Road Transport Corporation (then North Eastern Karnataka Road Transport Corporation) was bifurcated to serve north-eastern Karnataka.

This left the corporation serving the southern part of Karnataka, centred on Bengaluru.

- On 23 November 2009, the Bijapur division was transferred from NWKRTC to KKRTC.
- On 1 November 2014, the corporation adopted its present name, Bengaluru Metropolitan Transport Corporation, along with other city agencies renamed as part of the state's shift to the Kannada form of the city's name.

== Network ==
BMTC stop density, by scheduled daily arrivals

== Governance and administration ==
BMTC is administered by a Managing Director drawn from the Indian Administrative Service and appointed by the Government of Karnataka. Postings to the role have turned over relatively frequently in recent years; in June 2026, IAS officer Sivakumar K.B. was transferred to head the Karnataka State Road Transport Corporation after roughly eight months as BMTC's Managing Director, and was succeeded by Raghunandan Murthy, a 2014-batch IAS officer who continues to hold concurrent charge as Commissioner of Treasuries.

=== Metropolitan coordination ===
Urban transport planning in Bengaluru has historically been divided among agencies such as BMTC, the BBMP (and, since 2025, the Greater Bengaluru Authority and its five city corporations), the Bengaluru Development Authority and the Bengaluru Metro Rail Corporation. To address this, the state has periodically proposed a unified coordinating body. The Bengaluru Metropolitan Land Transport Authority Bill, 2022 provides for a Bengaluru Metropolitan Land Transport Authority (BMLTA), chaired by the Chief Minister, on which the BMTC Managing Director sits alongside representatives of the BBMP/GBA, the metro rail corporation and other transport agencies. As of late 2024, the authority had not yet become operational, and civic commentators have pointed to continuing coordination gaps between BMTC and other mobility agencies in the interim.

BMTC itself remains a distinct state-owned corporation and was not merged into the five city corporations created under the Greater Bengaluru Authority framework, which govern municipal civic functions rather than road transport.

== Fleet and services ==
Video of a BMTC bus being cleaned in bus depot unit 33, Purnapragnya Layout, Bangalore (2024)

BMTC operates several branded categories of service, distinguished by livery, vehicle type and fare class.

Name of the Service	Description	Manufacturer	Gallery
Astra	Non-AC electric bus service, with a turquoise livery on JBM-brand buses, a violet-and-white livery on Ashok Leyland Switch-brand buses, and a light blue and dark blue livery on Tata Motors Starbus EV-brand buses.	JBM; Ashok Leyland's Switch; Tata Motors's Starbus EV	BMTC Switch EV
Bengaluru Sarige	Non-AC bus service built on Ashok Leyland, Tata and Eicher urban chassis, with a dark blue-and-white livery for Bharat Stage IV (BS IV) vehicles and a light blue-and-white or turquoise-and-white livery for Bharat Stage VI (BS VI) vehicles, connecting most parts of the metropolitan region.	Ashok Leyland; Tata Motors; Eicher Motors	BMTC Bengaluru Sarige
Bengaluru Darshini	AC sightseeing bus service built on Volvo 8400LE urban chassis, with a livery of pencil-sketch depictions of Bengaluru landmarks on a white background. The service covers around twenty sites of historical, religious and scientific interest in the city.	Volvo Buses	BMTC's Bengaluru Darshini
Metro Feeder	AC and non-AC services providing last-mile connectivity to major Namma Metro stations, usually prefixed 'MF'.	Ashok Leyland; Tata Motors; Eicher Motors; JBM	Midi bus (on Bengaluru Sarige livery) in Vijaya Bank Layout
Vajra	AC bus service operated using Volvo 8400LE, Corona Skypak and Switch EiV 12 buses, with a light blue livery, running on routes serving technology parks, industrial areas, major bus stations and residential areas.	Volvo Buses; Corona; Switch Mobility	BMTC Vajra BMTC Corona AC (Vajra) Vajra Electric Bus
Vayu Vajra	AC bus service built on Volvo 8400LE urban chassis, with a light blue livery, connecting the metropolitan region to Kempegowda International Airport on 21 routes.	Volvo Buses; Switch Mobility	BMTC's Vayu Vajra Vayu Vajra Electric Bus
Vegadootha Express	Non-AC, limited-stop express bus service built on Ashok Leyland, Tata and Eicher urban chassis, with a light blue-and-white BS VI livery, connecting the central city to the periphery of the metropolitan region. Routes are usually prefixed 'EX'.	Ashok Leyland; Tata Motors; Eicher Motors	
Vajra Vistara	AC intercity bus service on Volvo 8400LE chassis with a light blue livery, launched from March 2026 to provide limited-stop AC connectivity between Bengaluru and suburban towns roughly 40–50 km from the city centre, including Ramanagara, Kanakapura, Channapatna and Tumakuru. Routes typically carry an 'EX' suffix (for example, RMN-EX).	Volvo Buses; Switch Mobility	

=== Suburban and intercity expansion ===
From early 2026, BMTC began extending Vajra Vistara AC services beyond its traditional 25 km operating radius, following discussions with the Karnataka State Road Transport Corporation, which otherwise holds intercity route rights. Services to Ramanagara and Kanakapura were launched in March 2026, followed by Channapatna in May 2026 and a route to Tumakuru — described by BMTC officials as its longest Vajra Vistara route to date — later the same month, running 54 daily trips with a base fare of ₹120. BMTC officials said the routes have limited stops, mostly within Bengaluru city limits, so as not to compete directly with KSRTC's existing non-AC intercity services.

=== Fleet electrification ===
BMTC has expanded its electric fleet largely through gross-cost contracts (GCC), under which private operators own and maintain the buses while BMTC pays a per-kilometre rate, allowing electrification without large upfront capital outlay. By September 2025 the electric segment stood at more than 1,500 buses — roughly one in five vehicles in the fleet — and trade-press reporting citing The Times of India indicated that daily service had by then not only recovered from its pandemic-era decline but exceeded pre-pandemic scheduling on several corridors, with the fleet covering about 61,000 trips and 1.19 million kilometres a day. Tata Motors delivered 148 electric buses to BMTC in mid-2025 as part of this expansion, manufactured at its Dharwad plant and leased under the GCC model at a reported rate of around ₹41 per kilometre, with further AC electric buses ordered from other manufacturers to raise the electric fleet toward roughly 1,800 vehicles by the end of 2025. In October 2025, Transport Minister Ramalinga Reddy put the fleet at 7,067 buses, including 1,799 electric, and rejected calls from some public figures to privatise BMTC, arguing that doing so would prioritise profit over public service.

=== Former services ===
- Parisara Vahini/Parisara Snehi: light blue-and-white or dark blue-and-white livery, with grey and red graphics on some variants. Merged with Bengaluru Sarige.
- Janti Vahana: non-AC vestibule buses with light blue-and-white or dark blue-and-white liveries. Now defunct.
- Suvarna: non-AC buses with a green or orange livery, similar in fare to Jana Sarige buses, serving feeder routes. Merged with Bengaluru Sarige, though some buses retain the older colours.
- Samartha/BIG Trunk: non-AC buses with a green-and-black livery serving trunk routes from downtown to the suburbs. Merged with Bengaluru Sarige.
- Nera Sarige/BIG 10:
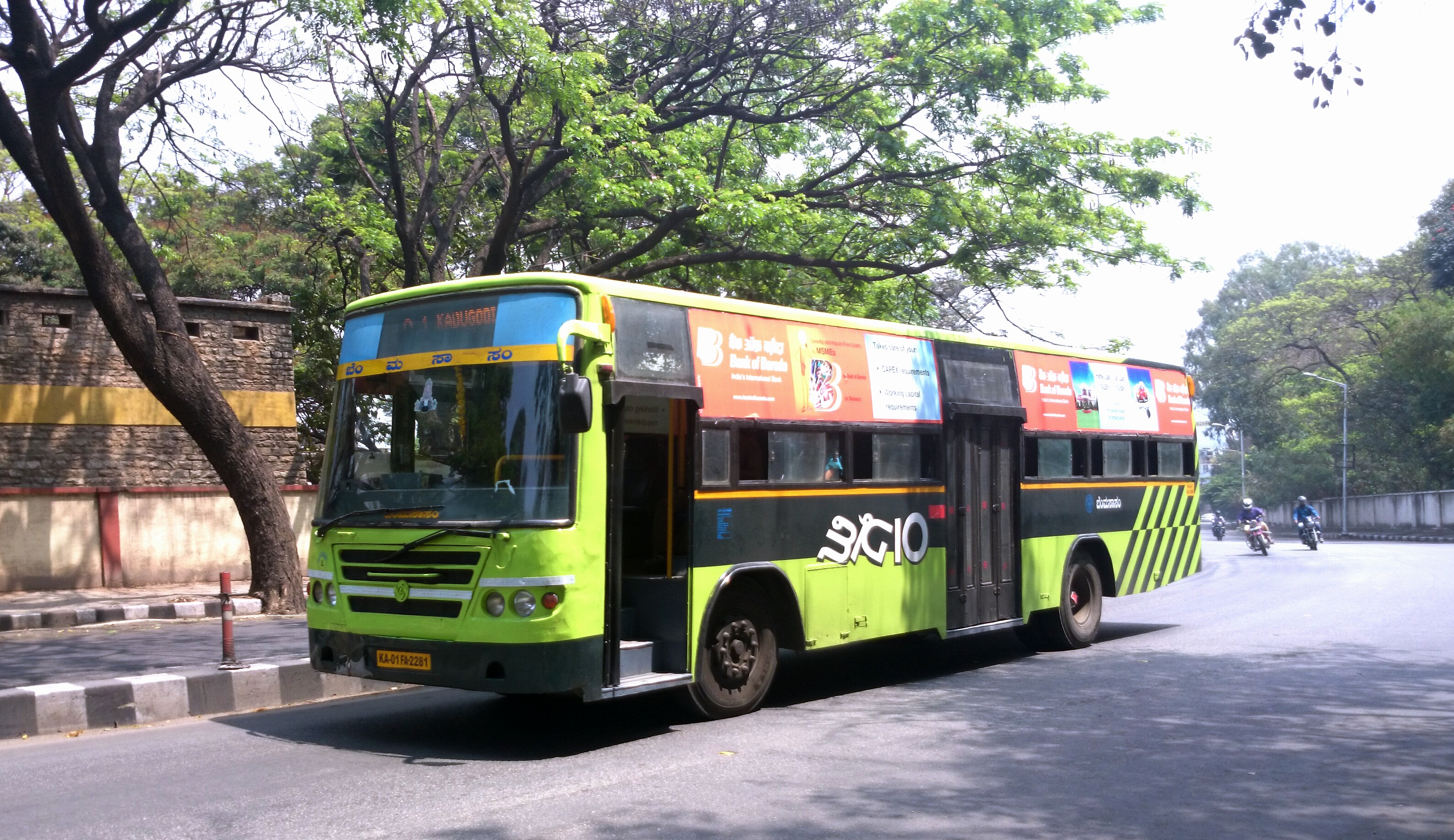
  Bangalore BMTC BIG 10 Bus
  non-AC buses with a green-and-bottle-green livery serving twelve major corridors into the central business district, numbered with a 'G' prefix. Merged with Bengaluru Sarige.
- Samvrutha/BIG Circle: non-AC buses with a white "BIG Circle" livery that plied Bangalore's Inner and Outer Ring Roads, numbered with a 'C' or 'K' prefix. Merged with Bengaluru Sarige.
- Atal Sarige: a low-fare, non-AC service with an Indian tricolour livery, now defunct.
- Pushpak Sarige/Janapriya Vahini/Pushpak Plus: non-AC buses with a beige-and-white livery, operated with a driver-cum-conductor. Discontinued; single-door buses were converted to double-door ones.
- Marcopolo AC, UD AC and Corona AC: services with a white or light blue livery. Marcopolo buses have been withdrawn; some Corona buses have been rebranded as Vajra.
- Nimbus: Bengaluru Sarige and Vajra buses that plied dedicated bus-lane corridors. The only such service, between Central Silk Board Junction and Krishnarajapura, was withdrawn and converted to regular Bengaluru Sarige service after the bus lane was closed for Namma Metro Blue Line construction on the Outer Ring Road.

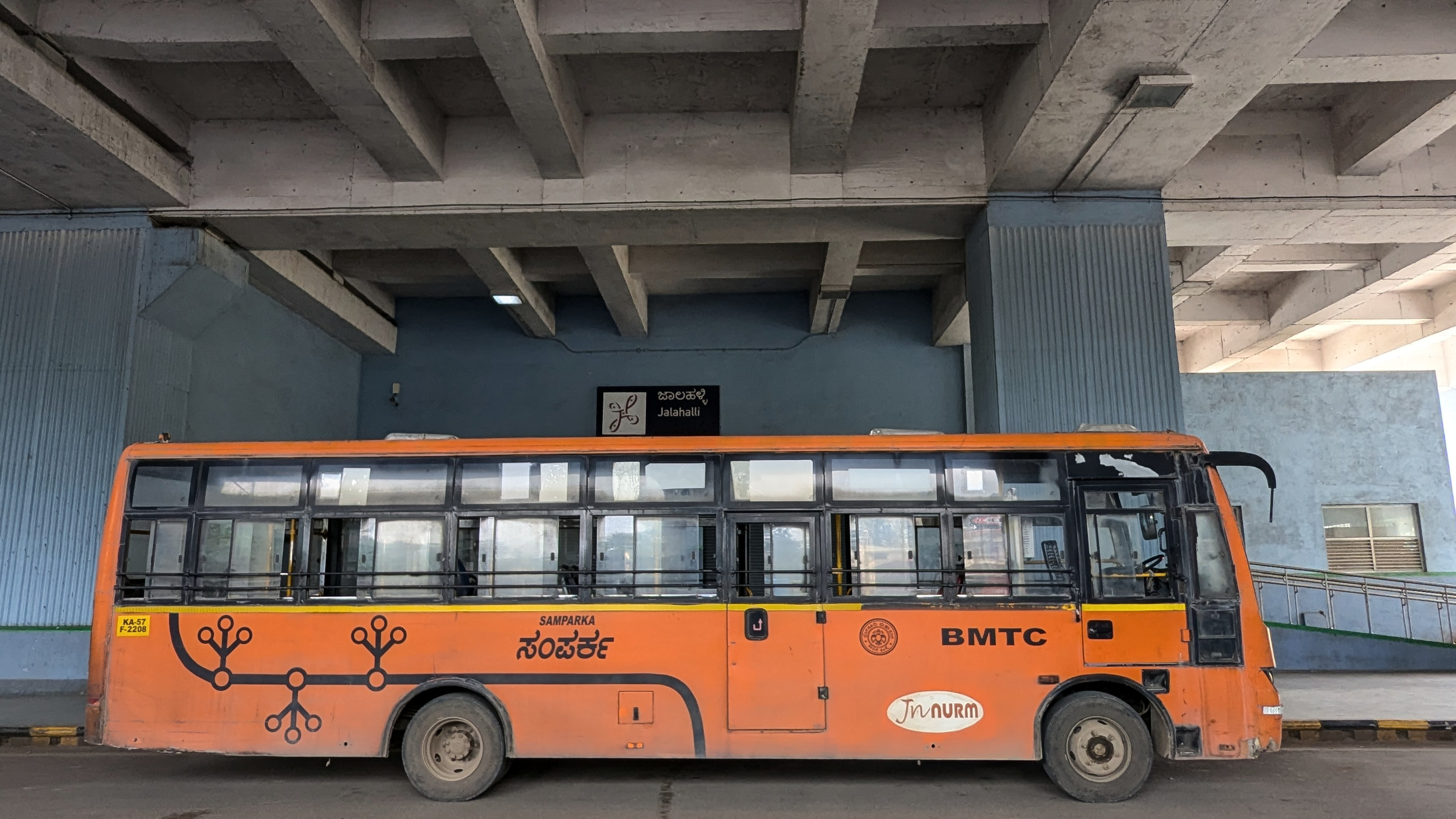
BMTC midi bus at Jalahalli Metro Station

- Samparka: non-AC mini-bus services built on Ashok Leyland and Tata mini urban chassis, with an orange livery, connecting neighbourhoods to the nearest bus station over short distances. Merged with Bengaluru Sarige.

Note: the Parisara Vahini/Parisara Snehi, Suvarna Sarige, Samartha Sarige/BIG Trunk, Nera Sarige/BIG 10, Samvrutha Sarige/BIG Circle, Metro Feeder, Nimbus and Samparka services retain their original numbering and function despite these branding changes.

== Infrastructure ==
=== Depots ===
BMTC operates 50 depots across the Bengaluru Metropolitan Region.

Sl. No.	Depot Number	Depot Name	Division	District	Ref
1	2	Shanthinagara	South	Bangalore Urban	
2	3	Shanthinagara	South	Bangalore Urban	
3	4	Jayanagara	South	Bangalore Urban	
4	6	Indiranagara	East	Bangalore Urban	
5	7	Subashnagara	Central	Bangalore Urban	
6	8	Yeshwanthapura	North	Bangalore Urban	
7	9	Peenya	North-West	Bangalore Urban	
8	10	Hennuru	North-East	Bangalore Urban	
9	11	Yelahanka	North	Bangalore Urban	
10	12	Kengeri	South-West	Bangalore Urban	
11	13	Katriguppe	Central	Bangalore Urban	
12	14	Rabindranath Tagore Nagara	North-East	Bangalore Urban	
13	15	Koramangala	East	Bangalore Urban	
14	16	Deepanjali Nagara	West	Bangalore Urban	
15	17	Chandra Layout	West	Bangalore Urban	
16	18	ITPL	Central	Bangalore Urban	
17	19	Electronic City	East	Bangalore Urban	
18	20	Banashankari	South	Bangalore Urban	
19	21	Rajarajeshwarinagara	West	Bangalore Urban	
20	22	Peenya	North-West	Bangalore Urban	
21	23	Kalyannagara	North-East	Bangalore Urban	
22	24	Krishnarajapura	North-East	Bangalore Urban	
23	25	H. S. R. Layout	Central	Bangalore Urban	
24	26	Yeshwanthapura	North	Bangalore Urban	
25	27	Jigani	South	Bangalore Urban	
26	28	Hebbala	Central	Bangalore Urban	
27	29	Krishnarajapura	North-East	Bangalore Urban	
28	30	Yelahanka	North	Bangalore Urban	
29	31	Sumanahalli	North-West	Bangalore Urban	
30	32	Surya City	East	Bangalore Urban	
31	33	Poornapragna Layout	West	Bangalore Urban	
32	34	Kothanuru Dinne	South	Bangalore Urban	
33	35	Kannahalli	North-West	Bangalore Urban	
34	36	Bidadi	South-West	Ramanagara	
35	37	Kengeri	South-West	Bangalore Urban	
36	38	Chikkanagamangala	East	Bangalore Urban	
37	39	Hosakote	North-East	Bangalore Rural	
38	40	Nelamangala (Makali)	North-West	Bangalore Rural	
39	41	Gunjuru	East	Bangalore Urban	
40	42	Kodathi	East	Bangalore Urban	
41	43	Arashinakunte	North-West	Bangalore Rural	
42	44	Anjanapura	South	Bangalore Urban	
43	45	M. S. Palya	North	Bangalore Urban	
44	46	Sadenahalli	North	Bangalore Rural	
45	47	Manduru	North-East	Bangalore Rural	
46	48	Byrathi	North-East	Bangalore Urban	
47	49	Bidadi	South-West	Ramanagara	
48	50	Devanahalli	North	Bangalore Rural	
49	51	Sadaramangala	East	Bangalore Urban	
50	52	Uttanahalli	North	Bangalore Rural	

=== Bus priority lane ===
BMTC, together with the Bengaluru Traffic Police, introduced a bus lane between Central Silk Board Junction and Tin Factory Junction on the Outer Ring Road, branded Nimbus, to give buses priority over other traffic and shorten journey times on a congested corridor. The lane was subsequently removed after the road's width was reduced by ongoing construction of the Namma Metro Blue Line on the median. Civil society groups have separately called on the state government to reinstate dedicated bus lanes and to fund the ten additional bus corridors proposed by the Directorate of Urban Land Transport.

== Fares and ticketing ==
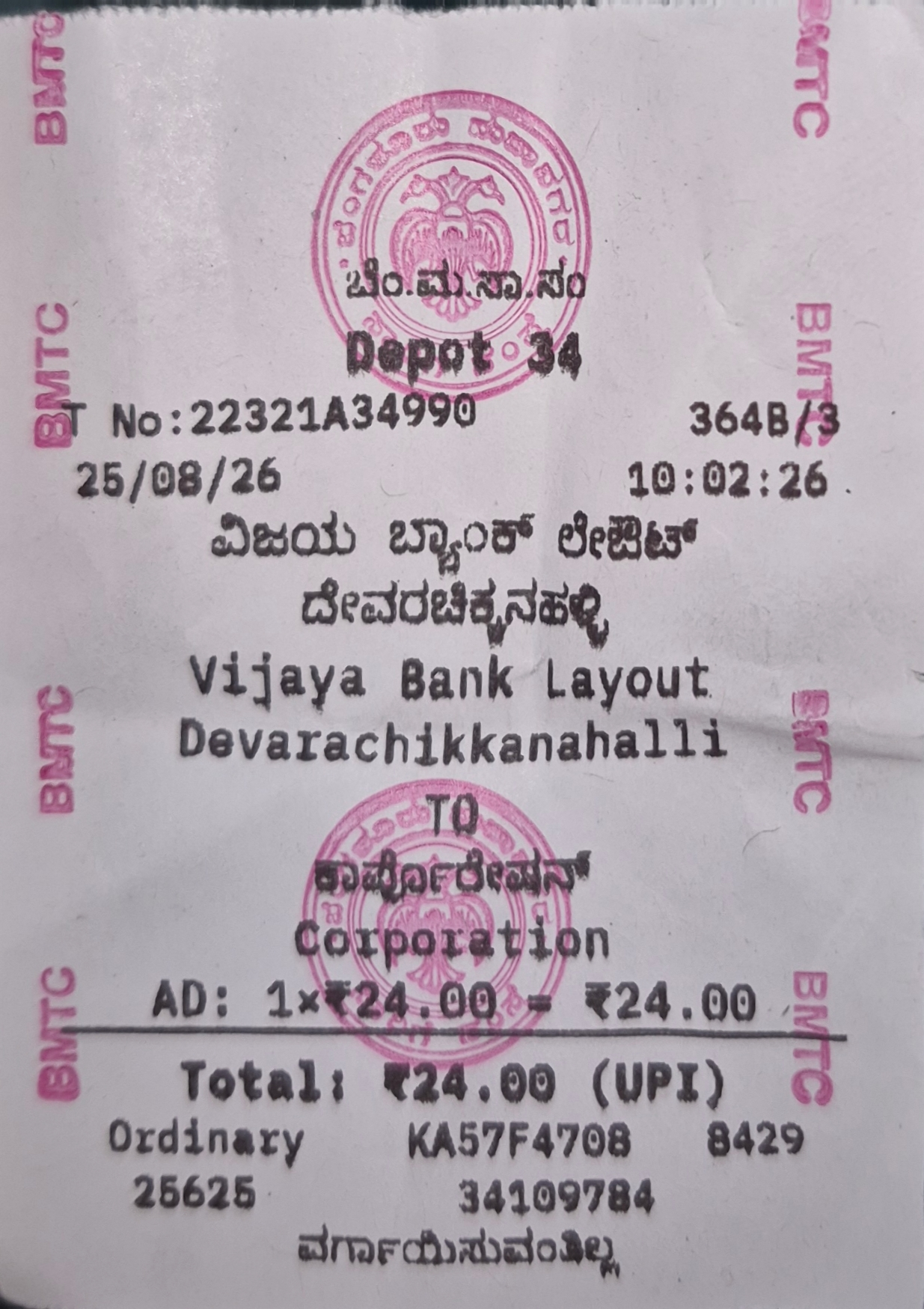
Bmtc bus ticket in 2026 via UPI payment

BMTC Ticket using NCMC Card

BMTC issues a range of monthly passes alongside single-journey tickets. Following a revision reported as effective from January 2026, fare notifications cited by regional media put the ordinary monthly pass at ₹1,200, the Vajra AC monthly pass at ₹2,000, and the Vayu Vajra Gold monthly pass (covering all routes, including the airport) at ₹4,000; concessional student passes are separately available through depots or the Namma BMTC app. Bus passes can also be purchased through the TUMMOC mobile app, described further below. In mid-2026, amid mounting financial losses discussed in § Finances, BMTC and Karnataka's other three state road transport corporations sought government approval for further fare increases, with BMTC reportedly proposing a rise of around 44 per cent, citing repeated diesel price increases and unpaid Shakti Scheme reimbursements; the state government had not taken a final decision as of early July 2026..On 10th September 2026 BMTC introduced NCMC Card ticketing system.

== Technology and digital services ==
BMTC launched an Intelligent Transport System (ITS) on 25 May 2016, fitting buses with GPS devices in a phased manner to transmit live location data to an ITS control room. On 20 May 2023, BMTC launched a bilingual (English and Kannada) mobile app, Namma BMTC, on Android and iOS, providing route and stop information along with real-time bus tracking and an SOS feature that alerts the nearest police station in emergencies. From 6 April 2022, bus passes began to be issued through the TUMMOC mobile app, with passengers scanning a QR code on board to verify a pass. BMTC also began accepting UPI ticket payments intermittently from 2022, launching the facility fully in June 2023, with QR codes displayed on board or with conductors for passengers to scan and pay.

=== National Common Mobility Card ===
BMTC unveiled a smart card for its bus services for the first time in June 2016 and introduced it on a trial basis on Bus No. 335, operating between Majestic and Kadugodi bus stations, in March 2017. Besides serving as an identification document, the card could be used to purchase bus tickets and be swiped at point-of-sale (POS)-enabled merchant establishments; it cost ₹5 (5.2¢ US) and could be recharged up to ₹10,000 (US$100), with higher recharges requiring identification. According to Axis Bank, BMTC's partner in the project, the card was India's first open-loop EMV contactless smart card. The scheme was eventually discontinued in favour of integration with the National Common Mobility Card (NCMC), which is also used by Namma Metro and is planned for the Bengaluru Suburban Railway, intended to allow seamless travel across the city's transit modes.

== Safety and accessibility ==
Following a rise in accidents involving BMTC buses, the corporation began installing advanced driver-assistance systems (ADAS) — supplied by Intel on a trial basis — on some buses from 2023 to warn drivers of collisions and monitor for driver drowsiness. In parallel, BMTC installed panic buttons in around 5,000 buses for use by women passengers in cases of harassment or emergency; pressing the button alerts BMTC's traffic control centre and dispatches a patrol team, in addition to front- and rear-facing cameras fitted to monitor unruly behaviour on board. Newer electric buses inducted from 2023 onward have been fitted with CCTV cameras, panic buttons and wheelchair ramps as standard equipment.

Civil society groups, including Greenpeace India and the Slum Dwellers Federation, have called on the state government to go further, seeking more gender- and disability-friendly bus shelters, additional women's safety measures such as helpline numbers and better-lit bus stops, permanent (rather than contractual) employment terms for drivers and conductors, and free or reserved travel provisions for transgender passengers, senior citizens and people with disabilities.

== Finances ==
BMTC's finances have come under sustained strain in the years following the launch of the Shakti Scheme (below). Media reports citing the corporation's balance sheets put BMTC's annual loss at around ₹178 crore in 2021–22, rising to nearly ₹997 crore in 2022–23, with a further loss of roughly ₹575 crore projected for 2023–24; the state's four road transport corporations collectively reported daily operating costs exceeding ₹31 crore, driven by fuel and staff salary expenses. Officials have said the state government's reimbursements for the Shakti Scheme have repeatedly lagged behind what is owed, with one report in early 2026 citing a shortfall of around ₹850 crore against dues of over ₹3,097 crore, straining BMTC's day-to-day cash flow and contributing to proposals for state-backed borrowing to cover shortfalls. By mid-2026, Transport Minister Byrathi Suresh said the government had pending dues of several hundred crore rupees towards the scheme and that a Cabinet decision on fare increases, discussed in § Fares and ticketing, would need to balance the corporations' financial sustainability against the burden on passengers.

== Welfare schemes ==
=== Shakti Scheme ===
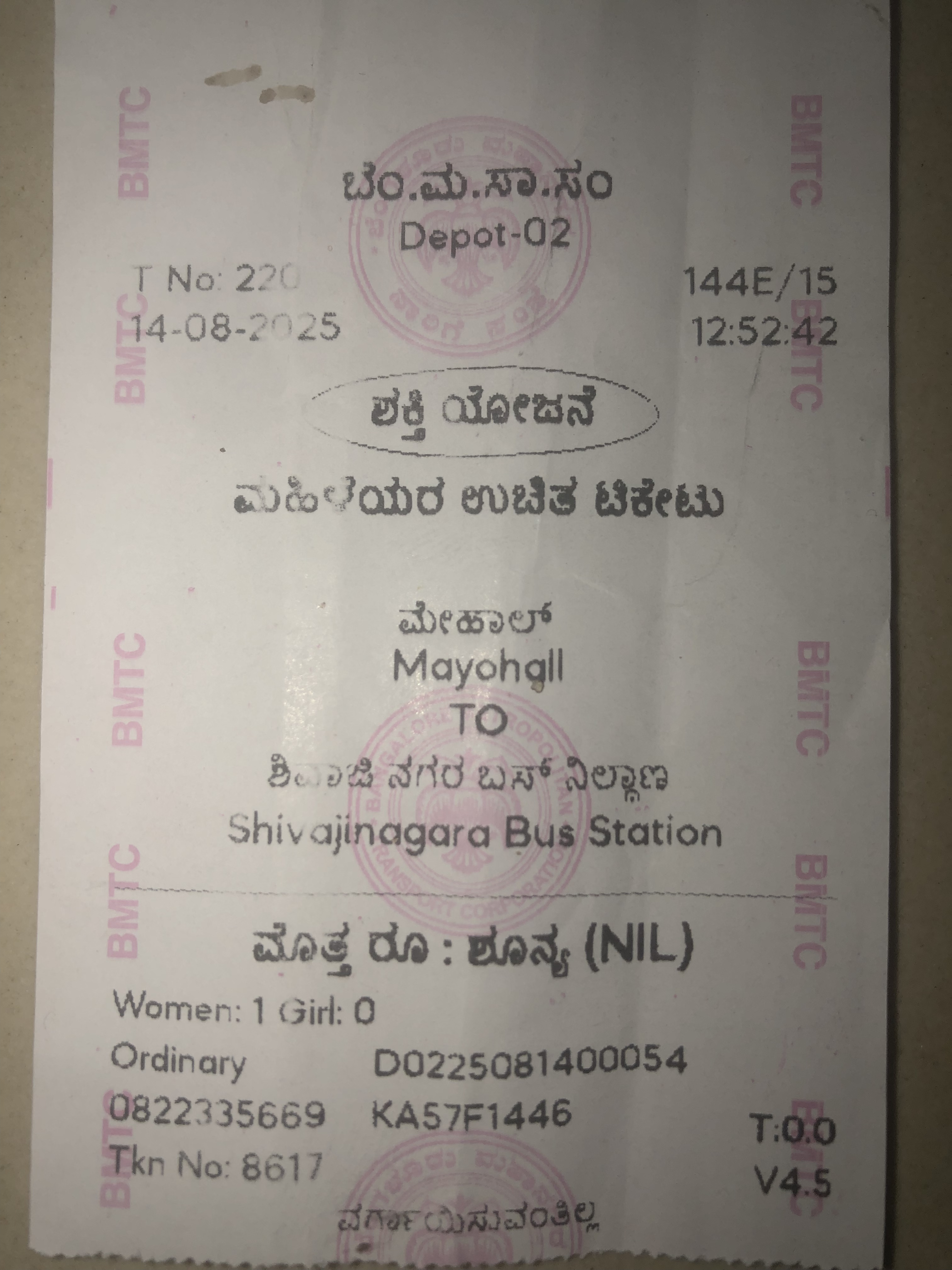
Ticket from Mayohall to Shivajinagara Bus Station under the Shakti Scheme on a BMTC bus

The Shakti Scheme was announced by the Second Siddaramaiah ministry on 2 June 2023 and began on 11 June 2023, providing free bus travel to Karnataka-domiciled women and transgender residents. Beneficiaries initially travelled by showing a government-issued photo identity and address proof, before being issued Shakti smart cards through an application on the government's Seva Sindhu portal. By mid-2026, the scheme had recorded more than 500 crore free trips statewide since launch, with an estimated 55–60 lakh women using it daily across Karnataka's four road transport corporations.

==== Terms and conditions ====
- The scheme applies to all four state road transport corporations (KSRTC, BMTC, NWKRTC and KKRTC).
- On BMTC, the Bengaluru Sarige, Astra and non-AC Metro Feeder services are covered, along with Nice Road buses (subject to a separate ₹25 toll fee).
- Free travel applies only to services within Karnataka; a woman travelling within the state on an interstate route that continues into a neighbouring state, such as an Udupi–Kasaragod service, still needs a ticket for the full journey.
- The scheme excludes luxury classes (Rajahamsa Executive, Airavat, Airavat Club, Pallakki, Ambaari and its variants, Flybus, EV Power Plus) and BMTC's AC services.
- On KSRTC ordinary and express buses, half the seats are reserved for men.
- The state government reimburses the transport corporations based on the distance travelled by women under the scheme, though these reimbursements have frequently run behind schedule; see § Finances.

=== Free bus passes for students ===
In his first cabinet meeting after taking office as Chief Minister in June 2026, D. K. Shivakumar announced a scheme extending free bus passes to all students in Karnataka, from school through postgraduate and doctoral level, including students from bordering districts of neighbouring states who study at institutions in Karnataka; the state issued the implementing order within days. The pass is valid on non-AC bus services of BMTC and the other three state road transport corporations. Because women and transgender students already travel free under the Shakti Scheme, the new pass chiefly extends free travel to male students, who must apply and obtain a pass rather than travel automatically. Applications opened through the Seva Sindhu portal from 12 June 2026, and students who had already paid for passes for the 2026–27 academic year were told they would be refunded.

== Awards and recognition ==
In October 2024, BMTC received the Award of Excellence in Urban Transport, in the category "City with Best Record of Public Involvement in Transport", from India's Ministry of Housing and Urban Affairs, presented at a ceremony in Gandhinagar, Gujarat. The award recognised BMTC's introduction of an intra-layout loop bus service in HSR Layout, described as the first of its kind in India.

== Karnataka's Road Transport Undertakings ==
- KSRTC, Bangalore: covers southern Karnataka, Udupi and Dakshina Kannada districts.
- NWKRTC, Hubli: covers north-western Karnataka and Uttara Kannada district, excluding Bijapur district.
- KKRTC, Kalaburagi: covers north-eastern Karnataka and Bijapur district.
- BMTC, Bangalore: covers the Bengaluru Metropolitan Region, including Bengaluru Urban district and parts of Bengaluru Rural, Ramanagara, Kolar and Chikkaballapura districts. During festive rush periods, Bengaluru Sarige buses are sometimes allocated to Karnataka Sarige (ordinary) intercity routes.

== Controversies ==
In October 2023, police arrested a former BMTC chief traffic manager and placed six other officials under scrutiny after an investigation found forged signatures of senior officials had been used to approve contracts and tenders, including irregular extensions of cleaning contracts and improper tax exemptions, causing the corporation a reported financial loss of ₹17.64 crore.

== See also ==
- List of bus depots in Karnataka
- List of bus stations in Karnataka
- Greater Bengaluru Authority
- Namma Metro
- Karnataka State Road Transport Corporation
