= Nagasandra metro station =

Namma Metro's Green Line metro station

Nagasandra
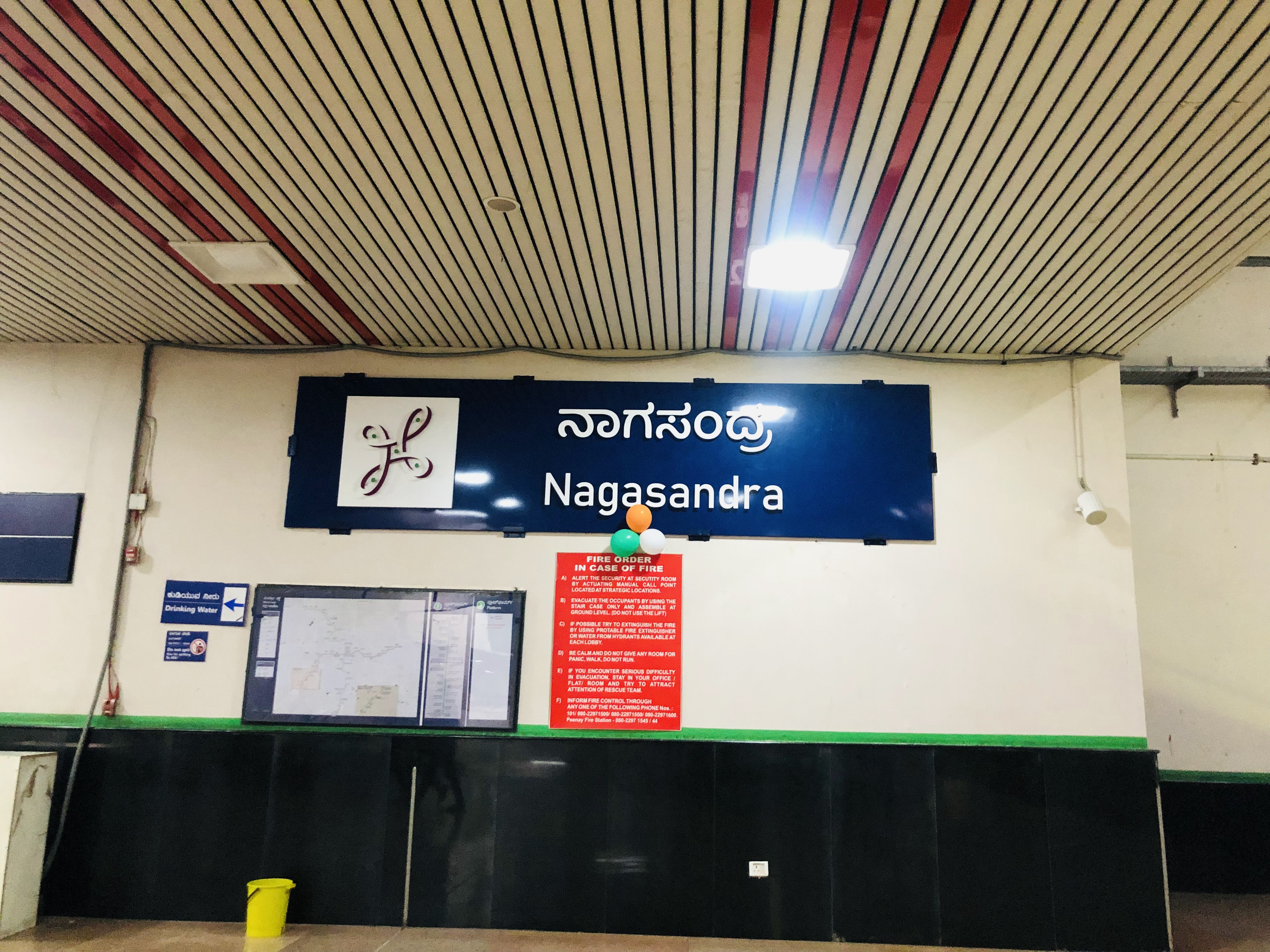
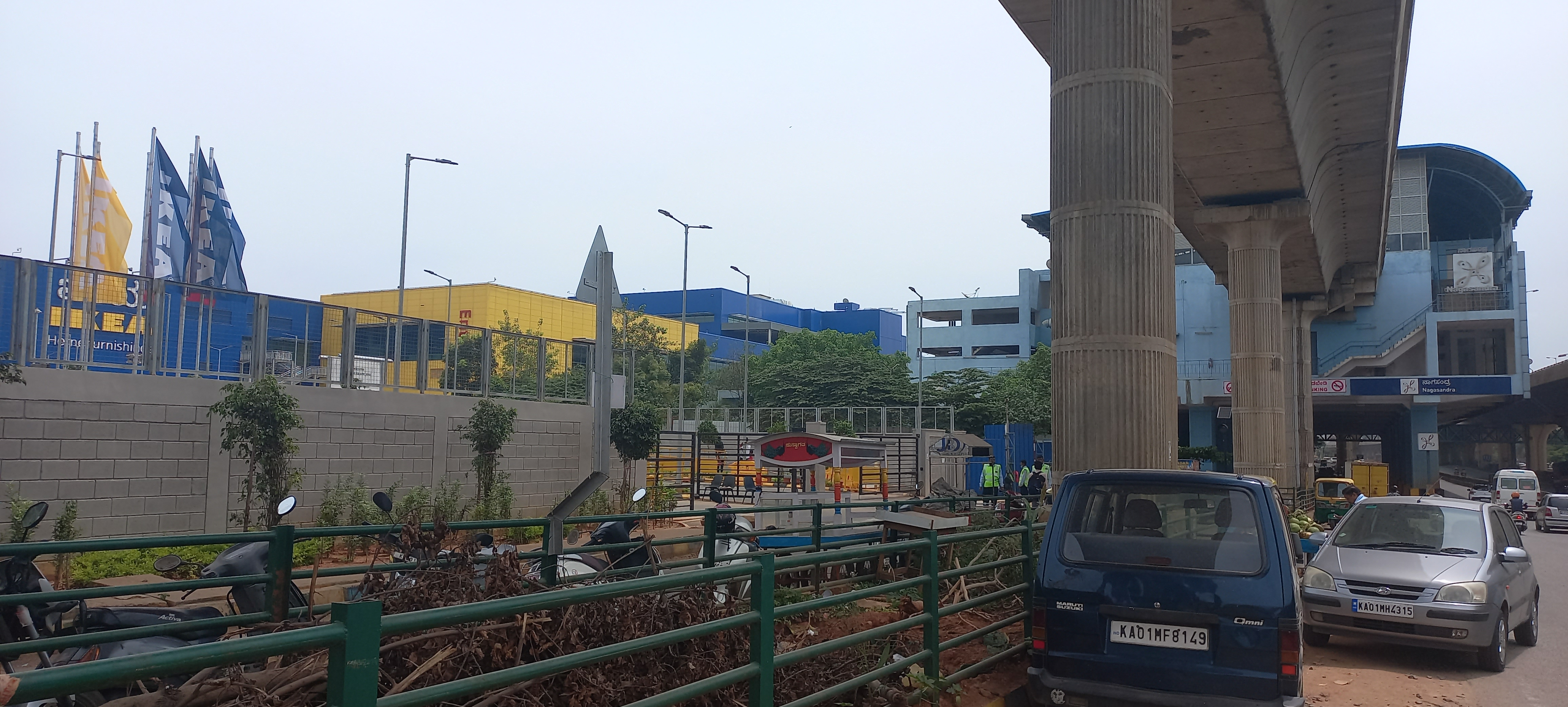
- Nagasandra metro station with IKEA Nagasandra

General information
- Location: Malur Byranahalli Road Bengaluru, Karnataka 560073
- Coordinates: 13°02′53″N 77°30′00″E
- System: Namma Metro station
- Owner: Bangalore Metro Rail Corporation Ltd (BMRCL)
- Operator: Namma Metro
- Line: Green Line
- Platforms: Side platform Platform-1 → Madavara; Platform-2 → Silk Institute
- Tracks: 2

Construction
- Structure type: Elevated, Double track
- Platform levels: 2
- Parking: Available
- Accessible: Yes
- Architect: JMC Projects

Other information
- Status: Staffed
- Station code: NGSA

History
- Opened: 1 May 2015; 11 years ago
- Electrified: 750 V DC third rail

Services
Preceding station	Namma Metro	Following station
Manjunath Nagar towards Madavara	Green Line	Dasarahalli towards Silk Institute
Route map
Location

Nagasandra is an elevated metro station on the north–south corridor of the Green Line of Namma Metro serving the Bagalakunte area in Bengaluru, India. It was opened to the public on 1 May 2015. A foot overbridge connecting Nagasandra metro station to IKEA store was inaugurated on 18 October 2023.

== Station layout ==
G	Street level	Exit/Entrance
L1	Mezzanine	Fare control, station agent, Metro Card vending machines, crossover
L2	Side platform | Doors will open on the left
L2	Platform 2 Southbound	Towards → Yelachenahalli / Silk Institute; Next Station: Dasarahalli
L2	Platform 1 Northbound	Towards ← Madavara; Next Station: Manjunath Nagar
L2	Side platform | Doors will open on the left
L2

== Entry/Exits ==
There are 3 Entry/Exit points – A, B and C. Commuters can use either of the points for their travel.

- Entry/Exit point A: Towards IKEA Bengaluru side
- Entry/Exit point B: Towards MS Ramaiah Enclave Side
- Entry/Exit point C: Towards Jalahalli side

== See also ==
- Bengaluru
- List of Namma Metro stations
- Transport in Karnataka
- List of metro systems
- List of rapid transit systems in India
