= Bengaluru Sarige =

Public bus service in India

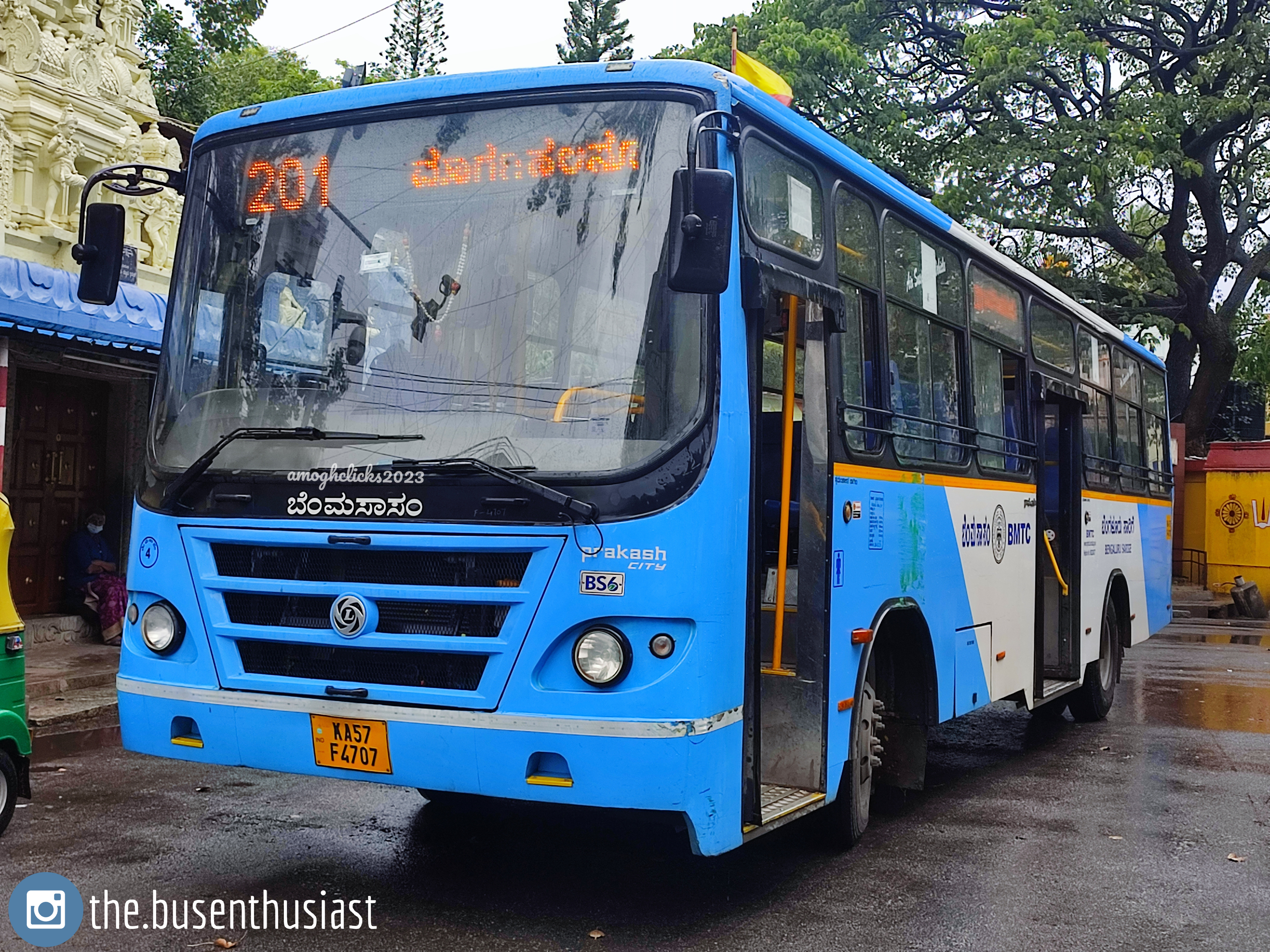
- Parent: Bengaluru Metropolitan Transport Corporation
- Locale: Bengaluru
- Service area: Bengaluru Urban district,Bengaluru Rural district,parts of Ramanagara district and Chikkaballapura district
- Service type: Non-AC Seater Intracity with Ashok Leyland, Eicher Motors, and Tata Motors chassis
- Fleet: 5,227
- Operator: Bengaluru Metropolitan Transport Corporation (under Government of Karnataka)
- Website: ksrtc.karnataka.gov.in/en

The Bengaluru Sarige or Nilli bus (Blue bus in Kannada), is a series of Economic Non-AC Intra-city bus service operated by BMTC across localities and villages of Greater Bangalore. Consists highest fleet of BMTC. And consists of 2+2 seat layout with no reclinable seats compared to Karnataka Sarige of KSRTC .

== History ==
It was launched on 15 August 1997 along with the formation of Bengaluru Metropolitan Transport Corporation to cater for the demand for Bangalore City and its sub urban areas.

== Description ==
These buses are low-floor buses compared to high-floor buses of Karnataka Sarige. Buses in this fleet are used in the bus service of Metro-Feeder(with prefix MF which midi buses of Samparka Sarige merging with Bengaluru Sarige) and Vegadootha Express(with prefix EXP).

== Welfares and Schemes ==
=== 'Shakti Scheme' Free Bus Service for women ===
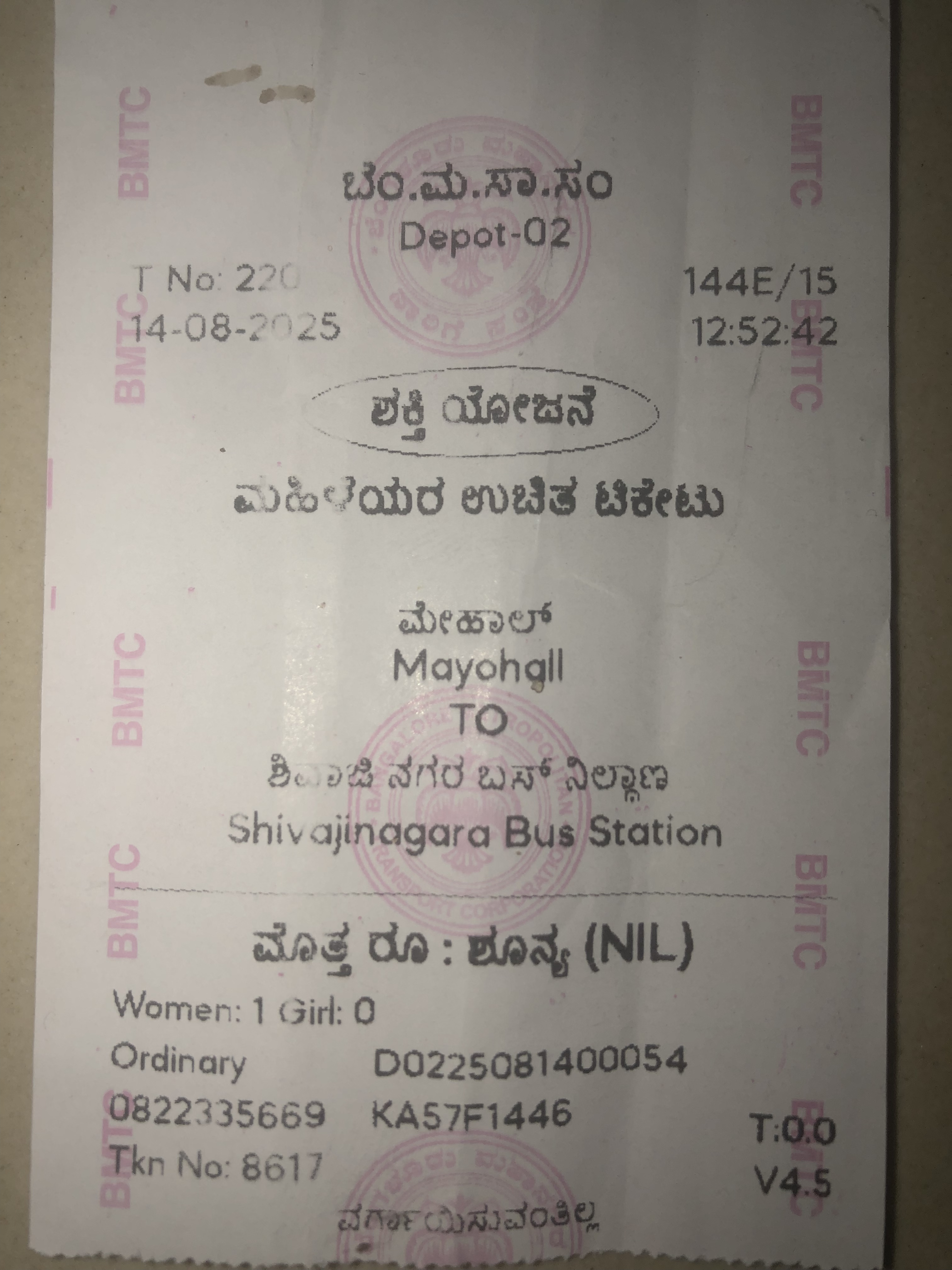
Bengaluru Sarige's Shakthi Yojana Ticket

'Shakti Scheme' was announced by the Second Siddaramaiah ministry on 2 June 2023. It started on 11 June 2023, providing free-of-charge bus service to Karnataka-domiciled women. Beneficiaries show their government-issued photo identity and address proof for the first three months. Bus conductors issue them zero-fare tickets. Thereafter, beneficiaries obtain Shakti smartcards (named after the name of the scheme) through an application submitted via the government's Seva Sindhu website.

==== Terms and conditions of the scheme ====
- The scheme will apply to all four Road Transport Corporations in the state (KSRTC, BMTC, NWKRTC and KKRTC).
- Bengaluru Sarige services is part of the scheme.
- Women can travel for free only on bus services within the state. Bus services to destinations outside Karnataka will be outside the scheme's purview even if women travel within the state. For example, a woman travelling to Mangaluru in Karnataka i.e., within the state on an Udupi-Kasaragod bus service which is an interstate service to Kasaragod in neighbouring Kerala, will have to buy a ticket.
- The scheme will not apply to luxury buses (Rajahamsa Executive Class, Airavat Class, Airavat Club Class, Pallakki Class, Ambaari Class, Ambaari Dream Class, Ambaari Utsav Class, Flybus, EV- Power Plus+services).
- Half of the seats on KSRTC ordinary and express buses will be reserved for men. Luxury, AC and interstate buses as well as BMTC buses will be exempted from this.
- The government will reimburse the BMTC based on the distance women travel.

=== Free Bus passes for Students ===
In June 2026 Karnataka government under the chief ministry of D.K. Shivakumar announced free buses for students studying in karnataka from primary school to postgraduate level and border areas within 20 km of karnataka border.It is free for both boys and girls.

- Bengaluru Sarige is part of this Scheme.

== Gallery ==
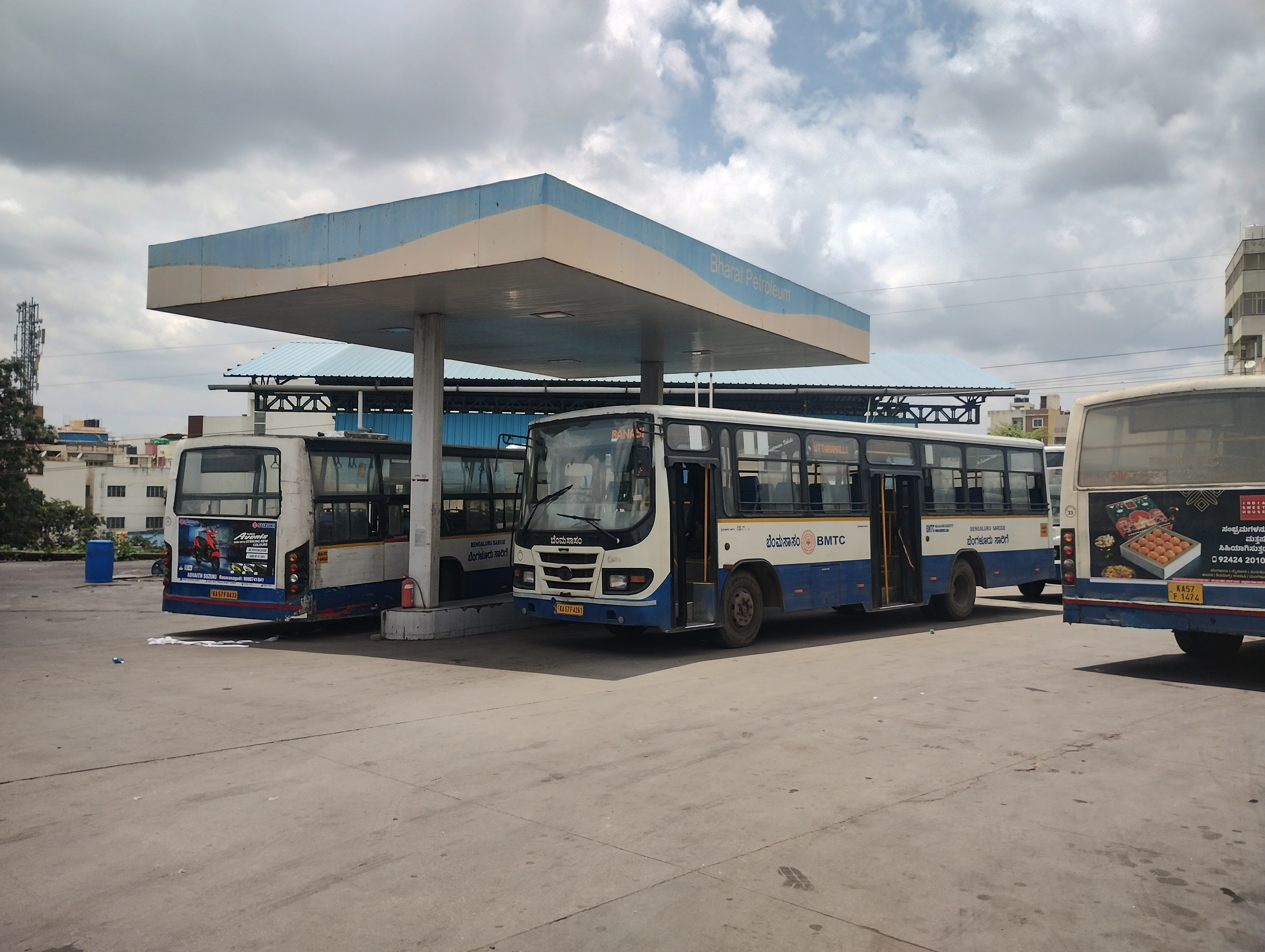
Bengaluru Sarige bus in BMTC bus depot

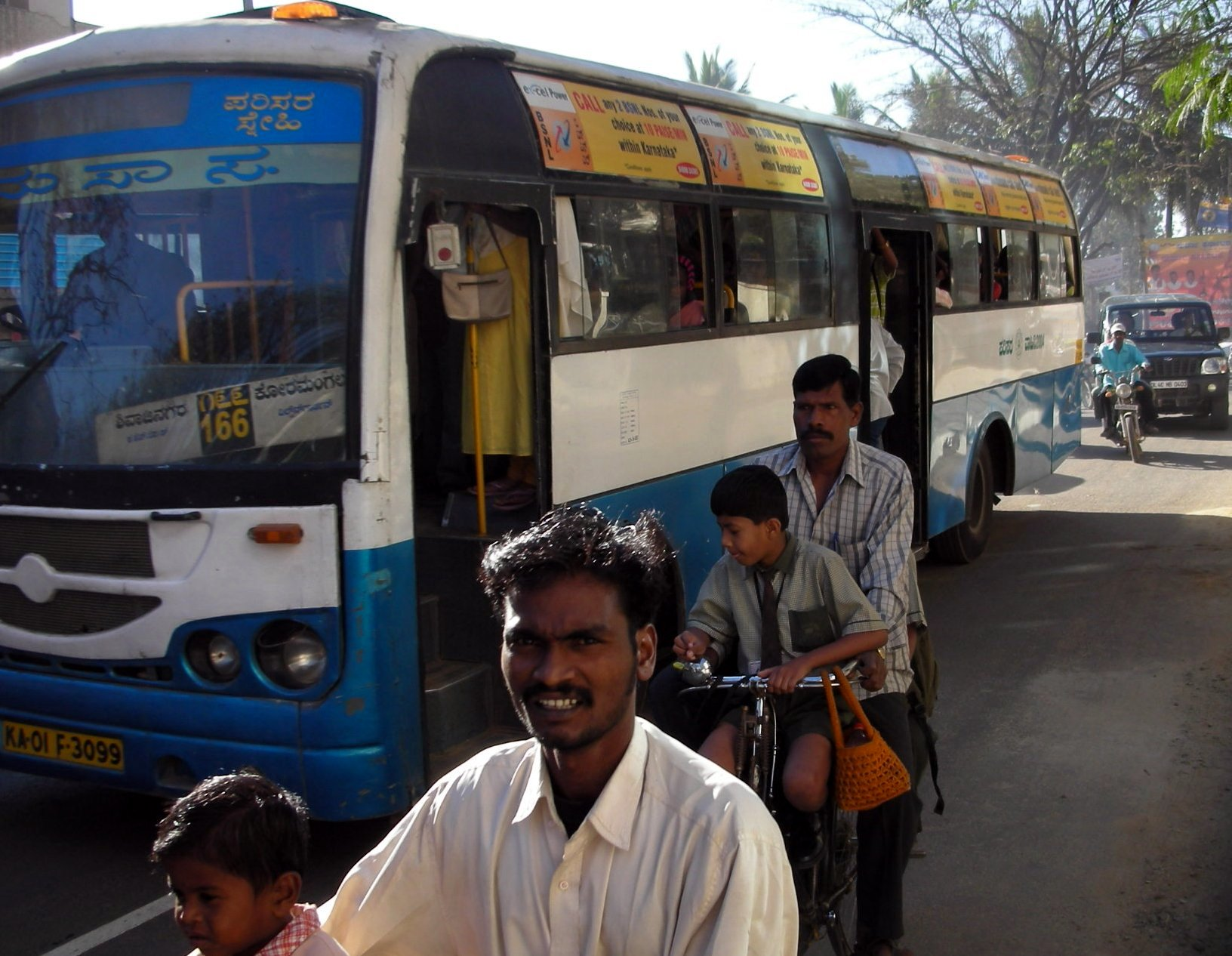
Old Bengaluru Sarige buses which has been scrapped

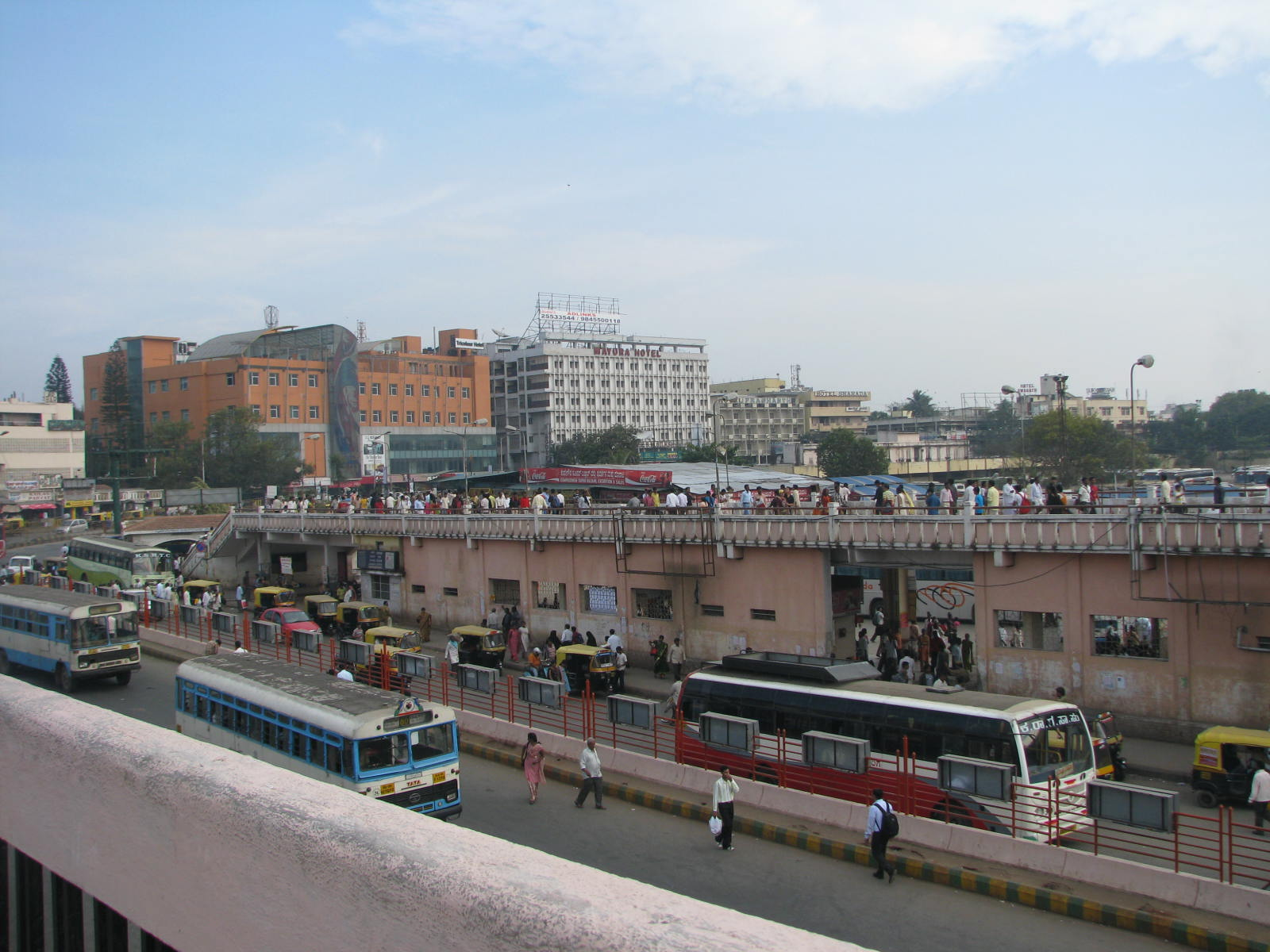
Bengaluru Sarige old High Floor bus in Kempegowda Bus Station

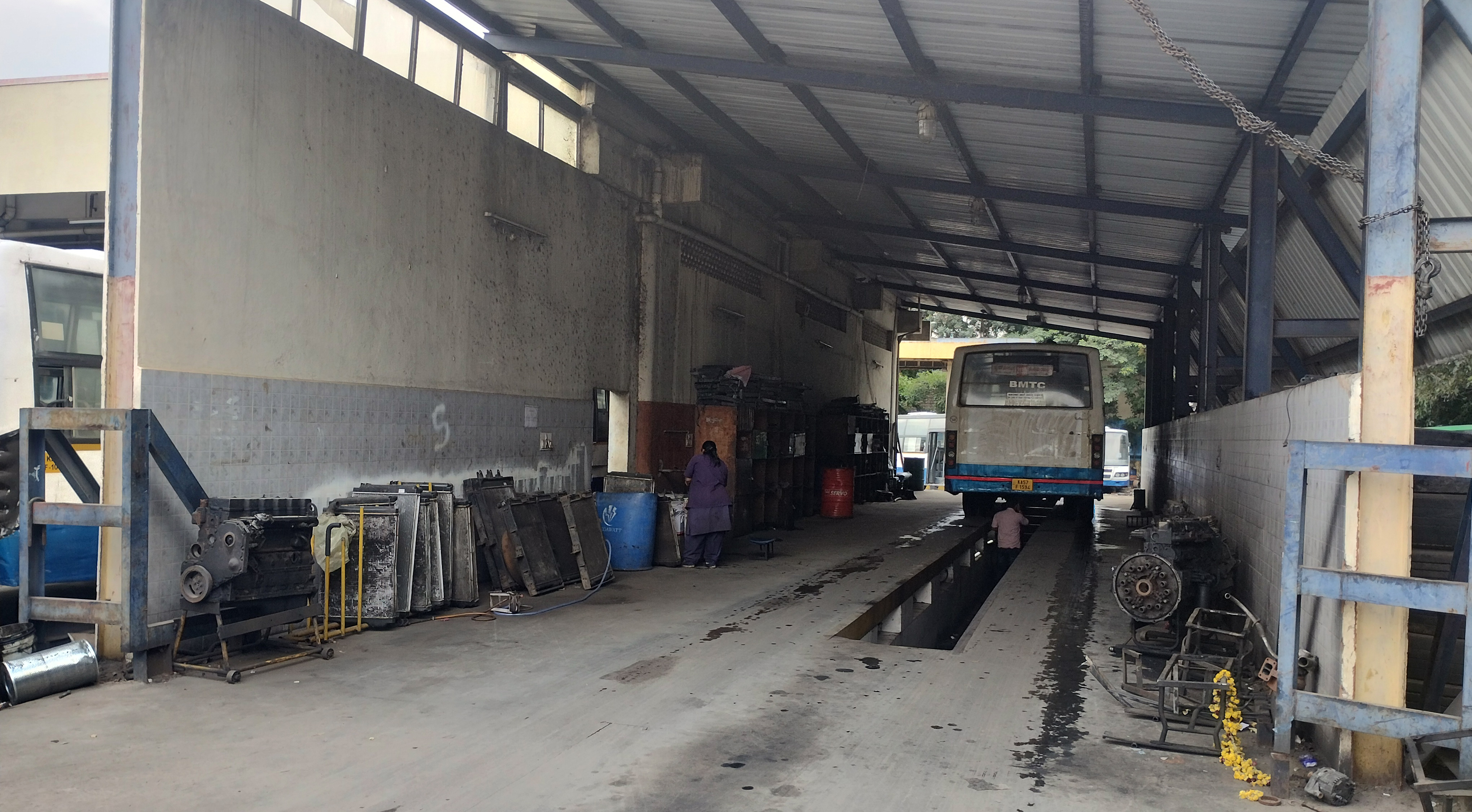
Bus in maintenance Depot

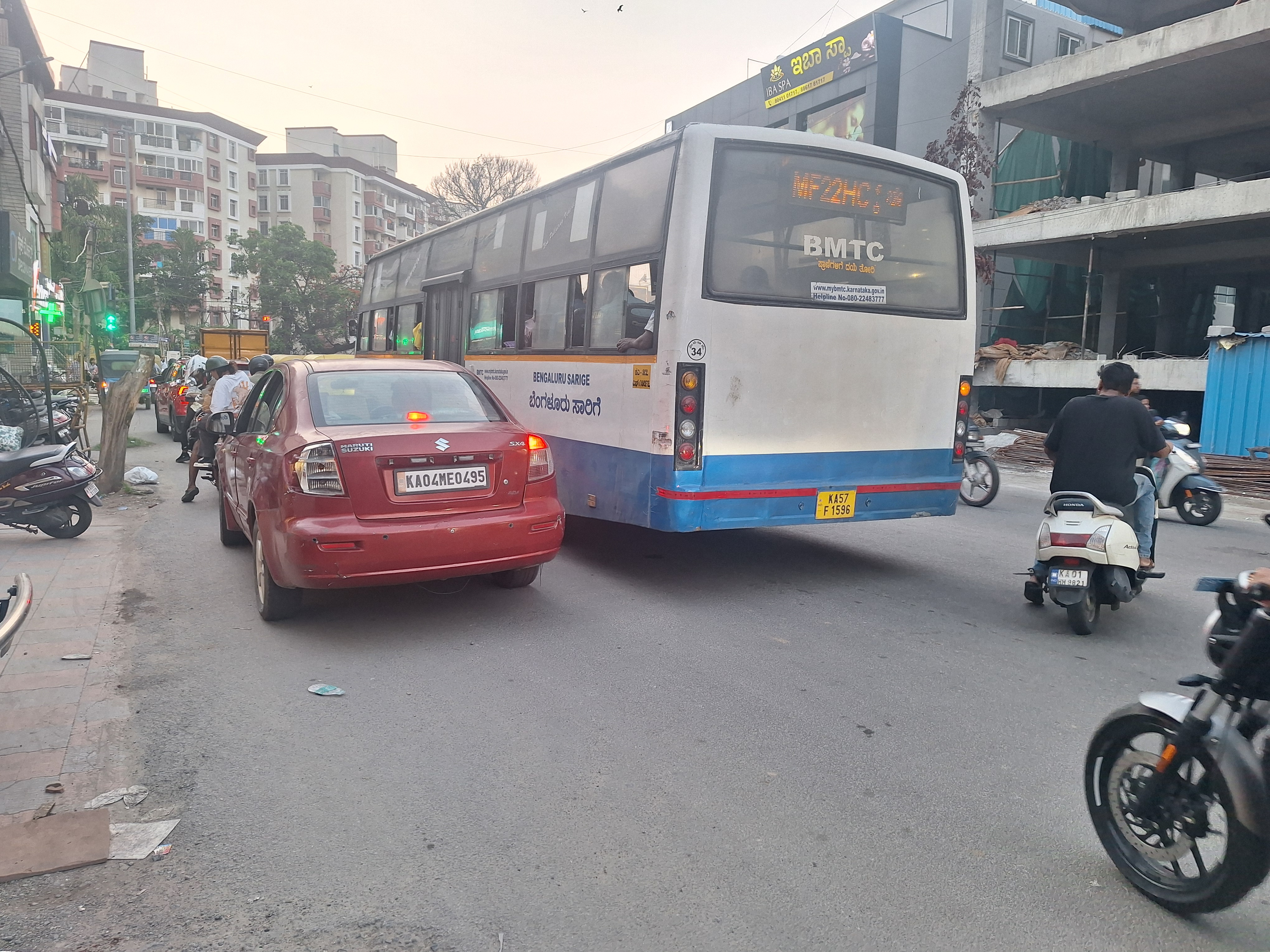
Metro-Feeder Midi bus (On Bengaluru Sarige Livery) stuck in Vijaya bank layout Signal

== See also ==
- Astra,BMTC
- Karnataka Sarige
- Nagara Sarige
