= Chikkabidarakallu metro station =

Namma Metro's Green Line metro station

Chikkabidarakallu
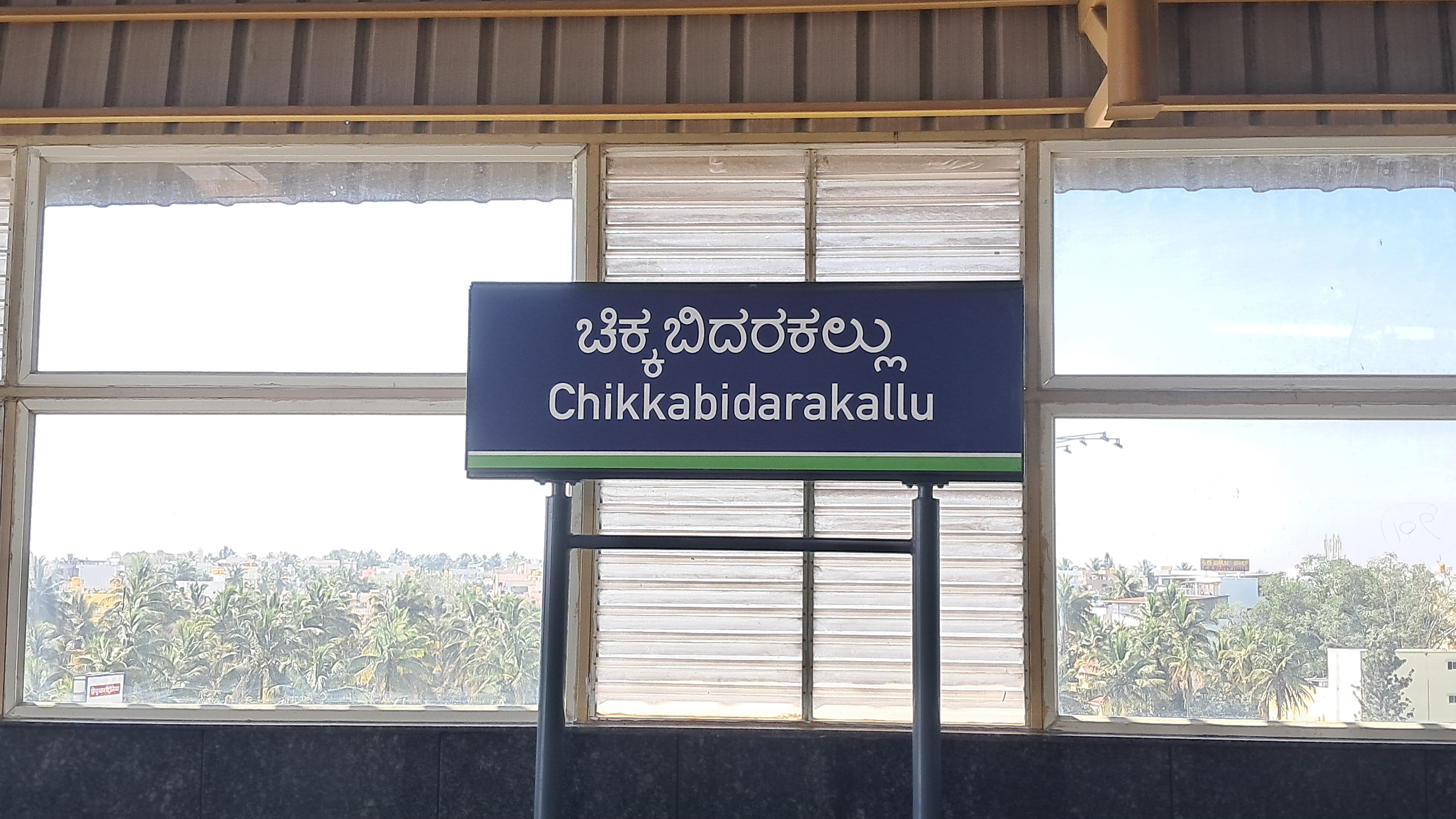
- Station Board as of February 2025

General information
- Location: Tumkur Road, Anchepalya, Bengaluru, Karnataka, 560073
- Coordinates: 13°03′09″N 77°29′17″E
- System: Namma Metro station
- Owner: Bangalore Metro Rail Corporation Ltd (BMRCL)
- Operator: Namma Metro
- Line: Green Line
- Platforms: Side platform Platform-1 → Madavara; Platform-2 → Silk Institute
- Tracks: 2

Construction
- Structure type: Elevated, Double track
- Platform levels: 2
- Parking: (TBC)
- Accessible: (TBC)
- Architect: Simplex Infrastructure

Other information
- Status: Operational & Staffed
- Station code: JIDL

History
- Opened: 7 November 2024; 21 months ago
- Electrified: 750 V DC third rail

Services
Preceding station	Namma Metro	Following station
Madavara Terminus	Green Line	Manjunath Nagar towards Silk Institute
Route map
Location

Chikkabidarakallu is an elevated metro station on the North-South corridor of the Green Line of Namma Metro in Bengaluru, India. The main Prestige Jindal City run by the Prestige Group of Companies in Bengaluru, Karnataka is located around this metro station.

The Madavara-Nagasandra stretch trial run was conducted on August 6, 2024 and with a successful trial run, the metro station was opened on November 6, 2024, with the commercial run starting from November 7, 2024. This metro station was opened without any inauguration ceremony but will be formally inaugurated at a later date.

== Station layout ==
G	Street level	Exit/Entrance
L1	Mezzanine	Fare control, station agent, Metro Card vending machines, crossover
L2	Side platform | Doors will open on the left
L2	Platform 2 Southbound	Towards → Silk Institute; Next Station: Manjunath Nagar
L2	Platform 1 Northbound	Towards ← Madavara
L2	Side platform | Doors will open on the left
L2

== See also ==
- Bengaluru
- List of Namma Metro stations
- Transport in Karnataka
- List of metro systems
- List of rapid transit systems in India
