= Dasarahalli metro station =

Namma Metro's Green Line metro station

Dasarahalli
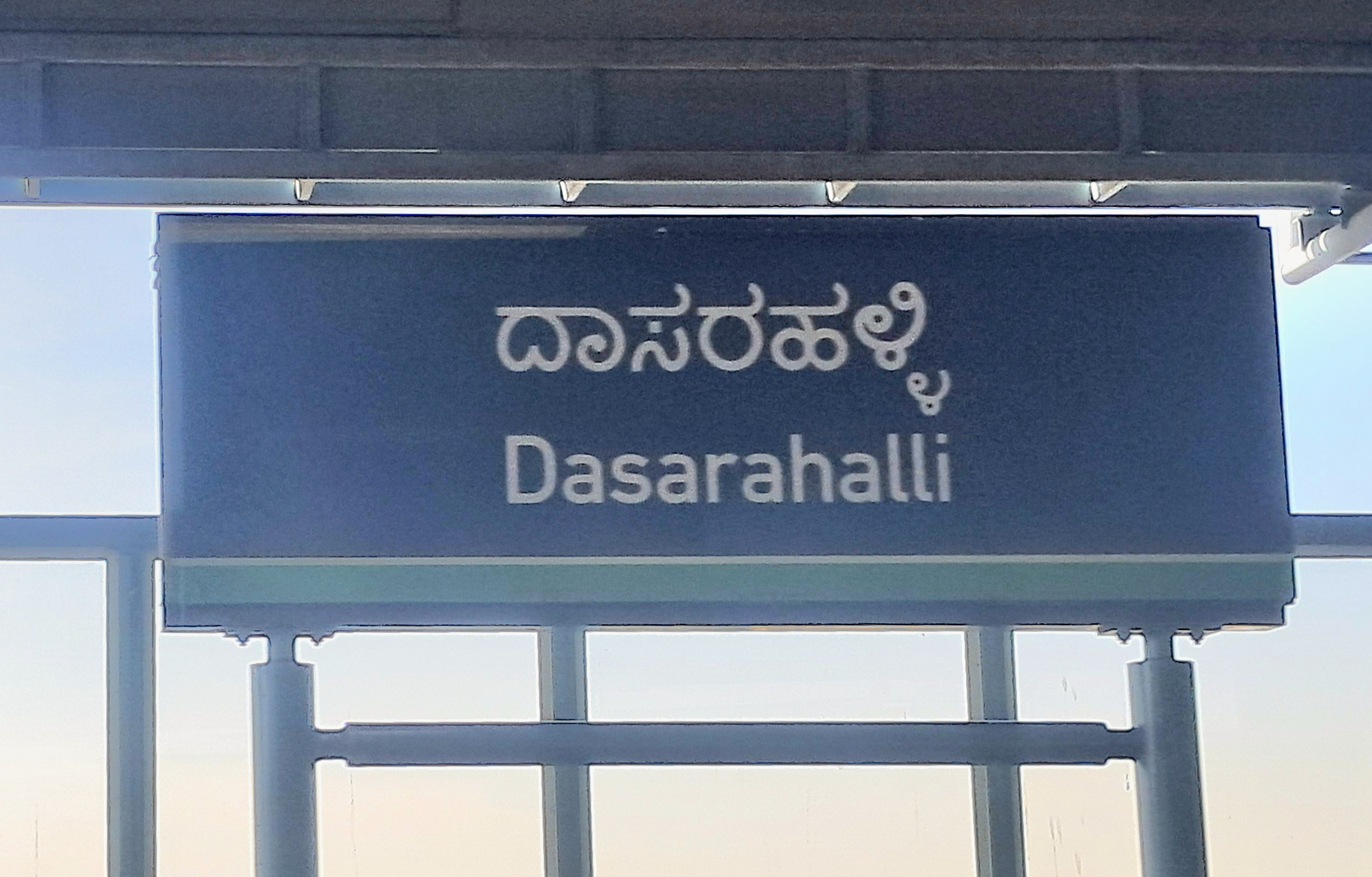
- Station Board as of February 2025

General information
- Location: Dasarahalli, Bengaluru, Karnataka 560058
- Coordinates: 13°02′37″N 77°30′45″E
- System: Namma Metro station
- Owner: Bangalore Metro Rail Corporation Ltd (BMRCL)
- Operator: Namma Metro
- Line: Green Line
- Platforms: Side platform Platform-1 → Madavara; Platform-2 → Silk Institute
- Tracks: 2

Construction
- Structure type: Elevated, double track
- Platform levels: 2
- Parking: Available
- Accessible: Yes
- Architect: JMC Projects

Other information
- Status: Staffed
- Station code: DSH

History
- Opened: 1 May 2015; 11 years ago
- Electrified: 750 V DC third rail

Services
Preceding station	Namma Metro	Following station
Nagasandra towards Madavara	Green Line	Jalahalli towards Silk Institute
Route map
Location

Dasarahalli is an elevated metro station on the North-South corridor of the Green Line of Namma Metro serving the Dasarahalli area of Bengaluru, India. It was opened to the public on 1 May 2015.

== Station layout ==
G	Street level	Exit/entrance
L1	Mezzanine	Fare control, station agent, Metro Card vending machines, crossover
L2	Side platform | Doors will open on the left
L2	Platform 2 Southbound	Towards → Silk Institute; Next Station: Jalahalli
L2	Platform 1 Northbound	Towards ← Madavara; Next Station: Nagasandra
L2	Side platform | Doors will open on the left
L2

== See also ==
- Bengaluru
- List of Namma Metro stations
- Transport in Karnataka
- List of metro systems
- List of rapid transit systems in India
