= Manjunath Nagar metro station =

Namma Metro's Green Line metro station

Manjunath Nagar
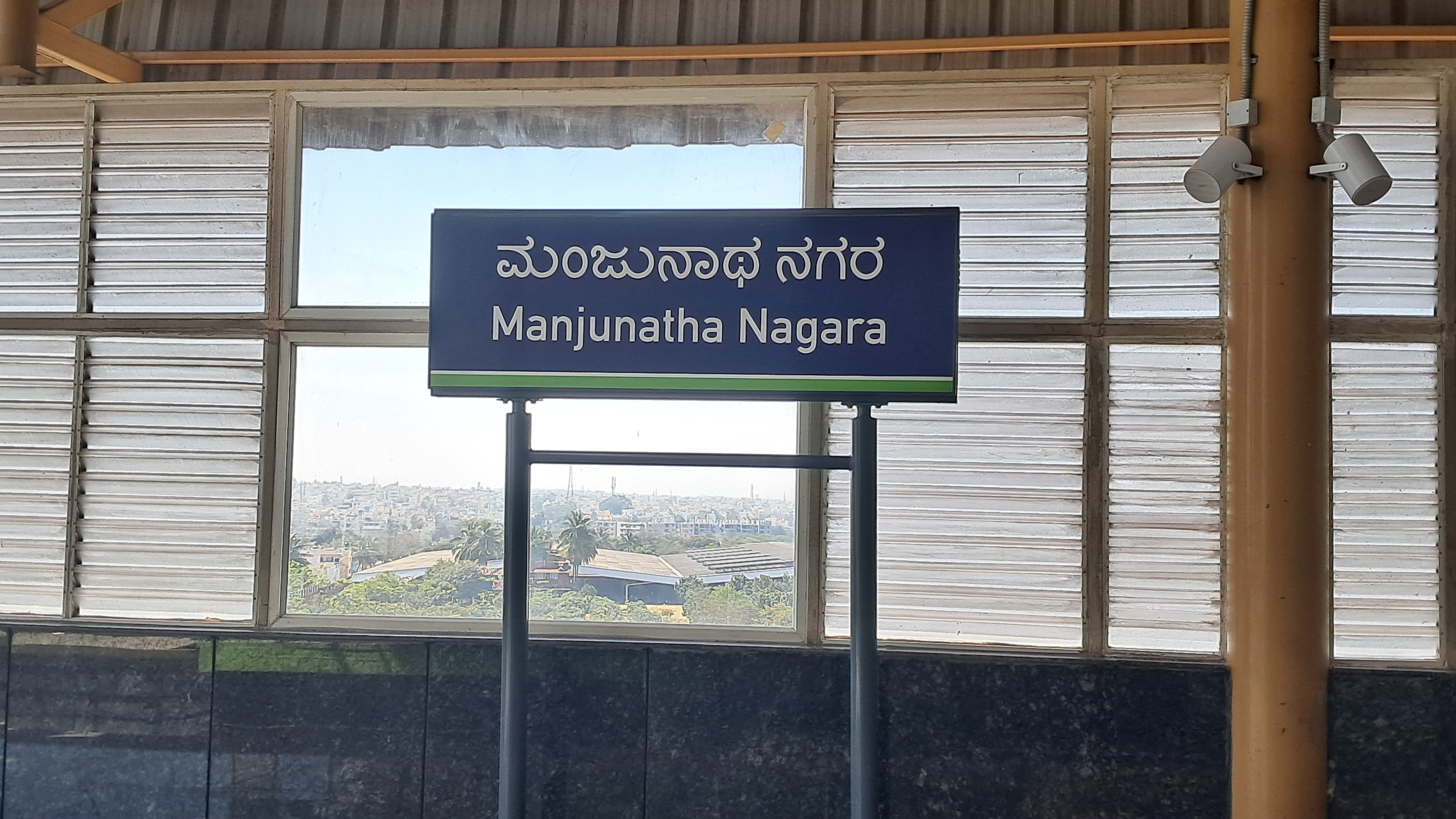
- Station Board as of February 2025

General information
- Location: Tumkur Road, Manjunath Nagar, Bagalkunte, Bengaluru, Karnataka 560073
- Coordinates: 13°03′00″N 77°29′40″E
- System: Namma Metro station
- Owner: Bangalore Metro Rail Corporation Ltd (BMRCL)
- Operator: Namma Metro
- Line: Green Line
- Platforms: Side platform Platform-1 → Madavara; Platform-2 → Silk Institute
- Tracks: 2

Construction
- Structure type: Elevated, Double track
- Platform levels: 2
- Parking: (TBC)
- Accessible: (TBC)
- Architect: Simplex Infrastructure

Other information
- Status: Operational & Staffed
- Station code: MNJN

History
- Opened: 7 November 2024; 21 months ago
- Electrified: 750 V DC third rail

Services
Preceding station	Namma Metro	Following station
Chikkabidarakallu towards Madavara	Green Line	Nagasandra towards Silk Institute
Route map
Location

Manjunath Nagar is an elevated metro station on the North-South corridor of the Green Line of Namma Metro in Bengaluru, India. Around this metro station holds the main Bengaluru-Nelamangala Expressway (NH-75) leading towards the suburb of Nelamangala in Karnataka.

The Madavara - Nagasandra stretch trial run was conducted on August 6 2024 and with approval from Commissioner of Metro Railway Safety (CMRS) received on October 4, the section finally opened to public on 7 November 2024, with the formal inauguration to be done at a later stage.

== Station layout ==
G	Street level	Exit/Entrance
L1	Mezzanine	Fare control, station agent, Metro Card vending machines, crossover
L2	Side platform | Doors will open on the left
L2	Platform 2 Southbound	Towards → Silk Institute; Next Station: Nagasandra
L2	Platform 1 Northbound	Towards ← Madavara; Next Station: Chikkabidarakallu
L2	Side platform | Doors will open on the left
L2

== See also ==
- Bengaluru
- List of Namma Metro stations
- Transport in Karnataka
- List of metro systems
- List of rapid transit systems in India
