= Astra (BMTC) =

Public bus service in India

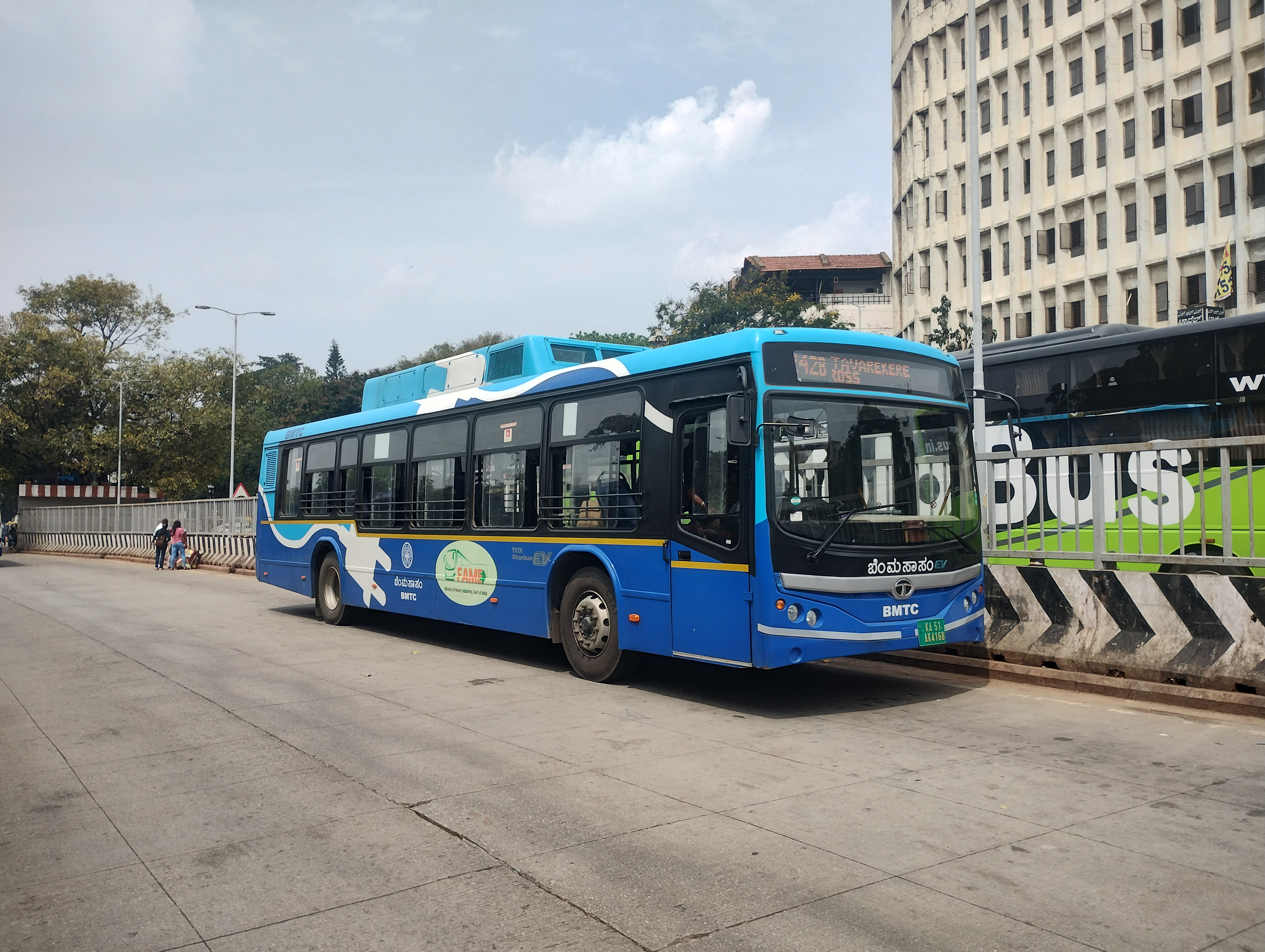
- Parent: Bengaluru Metropolitan Transport Corporation
- Founded: 27 December 2021
- Locale: Bengaluru
- Service area: Bengaluru Urban district,Bengaluru Rural district,parts of Ramanagara district and Chikkaballapura district
- Service type: Non-AC Seater Intracity with JBM Mobility, Switch Mobility, and Tata Motors chassis
- Fleet: 1750
- Fuel type: electric bus
- Operator: Bengaluru Metropolitan Transport Corporation (under Government of Karnataka)
- Website: ksrtc.karnataka.gov.in/en

The Astra or Electric bus is a series of Economic Non-AC Intra-city electric bus service operated by BMTC across localities and villages of Greater Bangalore. It serves as the highest fleet of BMTC along with Bengaluru Sarige. It consists of 2+2 seat layout with no reclinable seats, comparable to Bengaluru Sarige and Karnataka Sarige of KSRTC.

== History ==
Electric buses were launched on trial basis in 2014. It was launched on 27 December 2021 by then Chief Minister of Karnataka Basavaraj Bommai under the Smart Cities Mission.

== Description ==
These buses are similar to low-floor buses like Bengaluru Sarige, but these buses are electric rather than diesel buses.These buses are operated by private operators who manufacture the buses. These operators are paid by BMTC Buses in this fleet are used in the bus service of Metro-Feeder (with prefix MF which midi buses of Samparka Sarige merging with Bengaluru Sarige). 300 Buses under 'FAME-1 provided by switch mobility were launched on 15 August 2022. Buses under FAME-2 provider Tata Motors were launched on 28 July 2023.

== Welfares and schemes ==
=== 'Shakti Scheme' free bus service for women ===
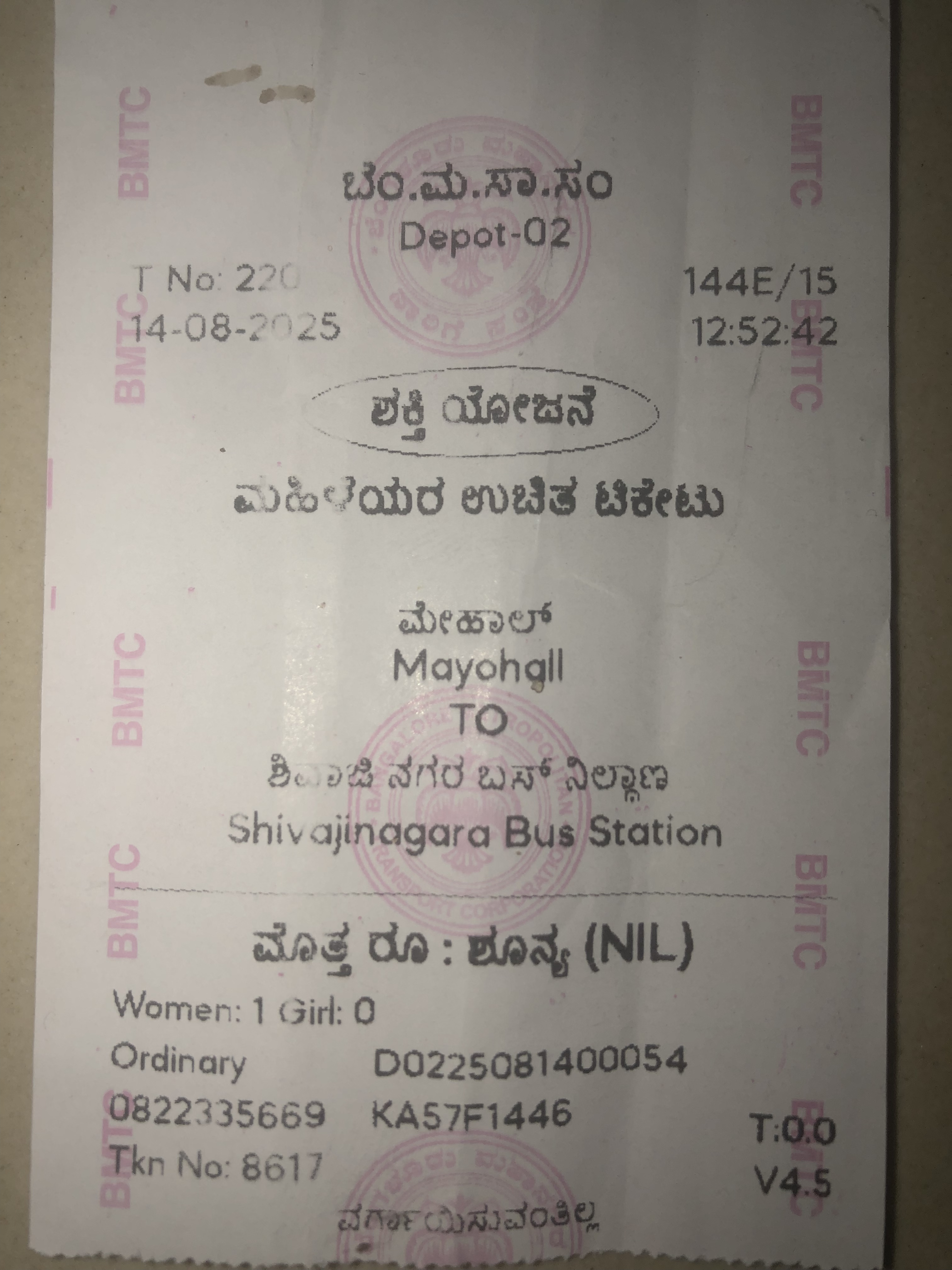
Non-Ac bus Shakthi Yojana Ticket

'Shakti Scheme' was announced by the Second Siddaramaiah ministry on 2 June 2023. It started on 11 June 2023, providing free-of-charge bus service to Karnataka-domiciled women. Beneficiaries show their government-issued photo identification and address proof for the first three months. Bus conductors issue them zero-fare tickets. Thereafter, beneficiaries obtain Shakti smartcards (named after the name of the scheme) through an application submitted via the government's Seva Sindhu website.

==== Terms and conditions of the scheme ====
- The scheme will apply to all four Road Transport Corporations in the state (KSRTC, BMTC, NWKRTC and KKRTC).
- Astra services are part of the scheme.
- Women can travel for free only on bus services within the state. Bus services to destinations outside Karnataka will be outside the scheme's purview even if women travel within the state. For example, a woman travelling to Mangaluru in Karnataka i.e., within the state on an Udupi-Kasaragod bus service which is an interstate service to Kasaragod in neighbouring Kerala, will have to buy a ticket.
- The scheme will not apply to luxury buses (Rajahamsa Executive Class, Airavat Class, Airavat Club Class, Pallakki Class, Ambaari Class, Ambaari Dream Class, Ambaari Utsav Class, Flybus, EV- Power Plus+services).
- Half of the seats on KSRTC ordinary and express buses will be reserved for men. Luxury, AC and interstate buses as well as BMTC buses will be exempted from this.
- The government will reimburse the BMTC based on the distance women travel.

=== Free bus passes for students ===
In June 2026 Karnataka government under the chief ministry of D.K. Shivakumar announced free buses for students studying in Karnataka from primary school to postgraduate level and border areas within 20 km of Karnataka border. It is free for both boys and girls.

- Astra is part of this scheme.

== Criticism and incidents ==
Buses, especially buses from FAME-II Scheme, have received lot of criticism.

- These buses face severe criticism over rash driving, driver negligence, and frequent breakdowns run by private operators.
- The then Transport Minister of Karnataka Ramalinga Reddy wrote letter to Union Ministry of Steel and Industry H.D. Kumaraswamy where he flagged poor operation of buses operated by private players, including lack of training for drivers, poor maintenance, and frequent strikes by staff.
- Many conductors complained steps on rear seats of these electric buses which effect on their health. Many of these conductors shifted to Bengaluru Sarige services.
- On 5 July 2026, a speeding Astra electric bus rammed into a stationary Vayu Vajra (airport) bus moving from Kempegowda Bus Station at Kr Circle. It was due to failure of break system. Because of this incident Transport Minister of Karnataka Byrathi Suresh said no new electric buses will be inducted until review of all electric buses under (GCC) model is done.

== Gallery ==
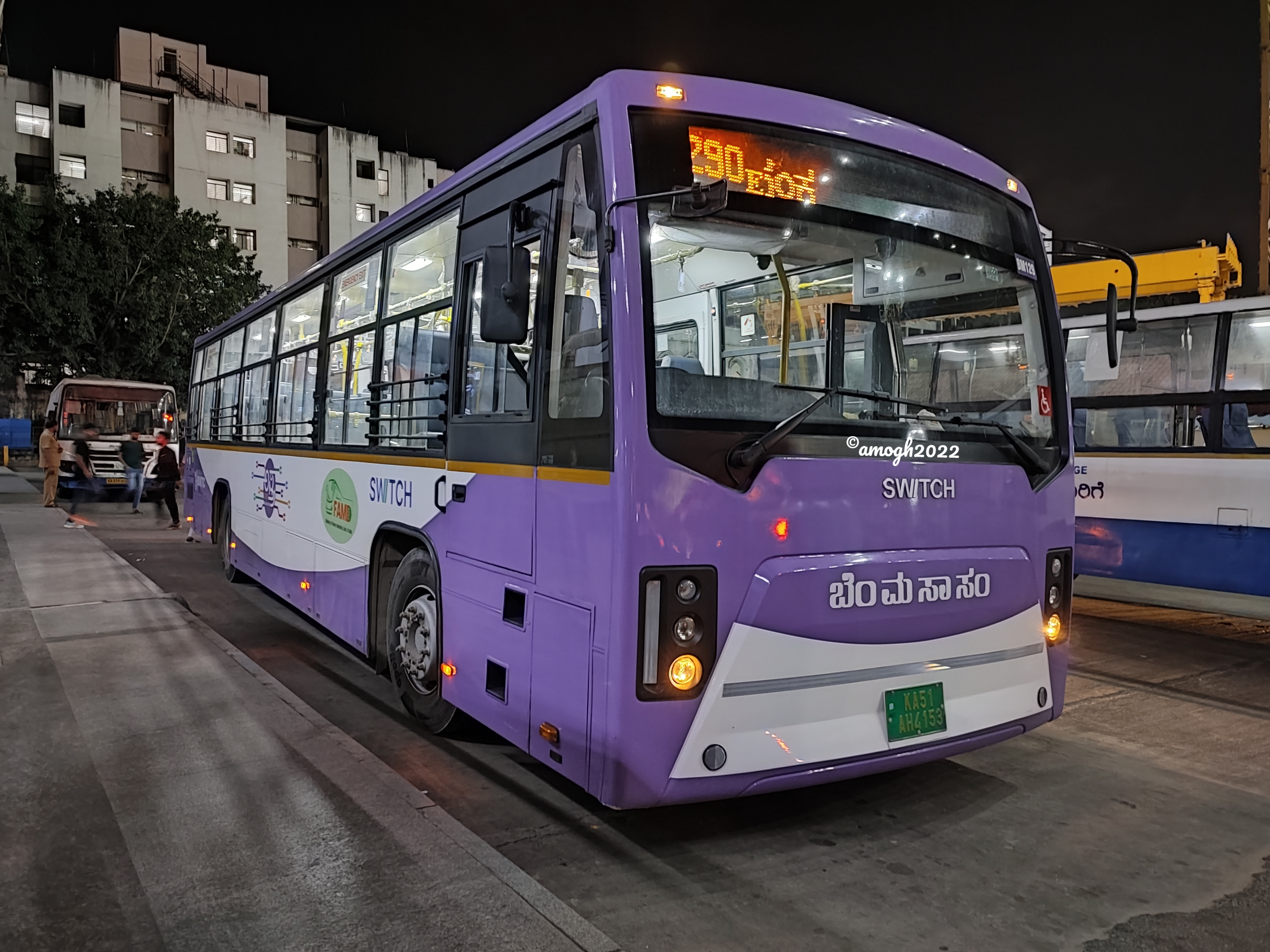
Switch Astra bus in BMTC bus depot

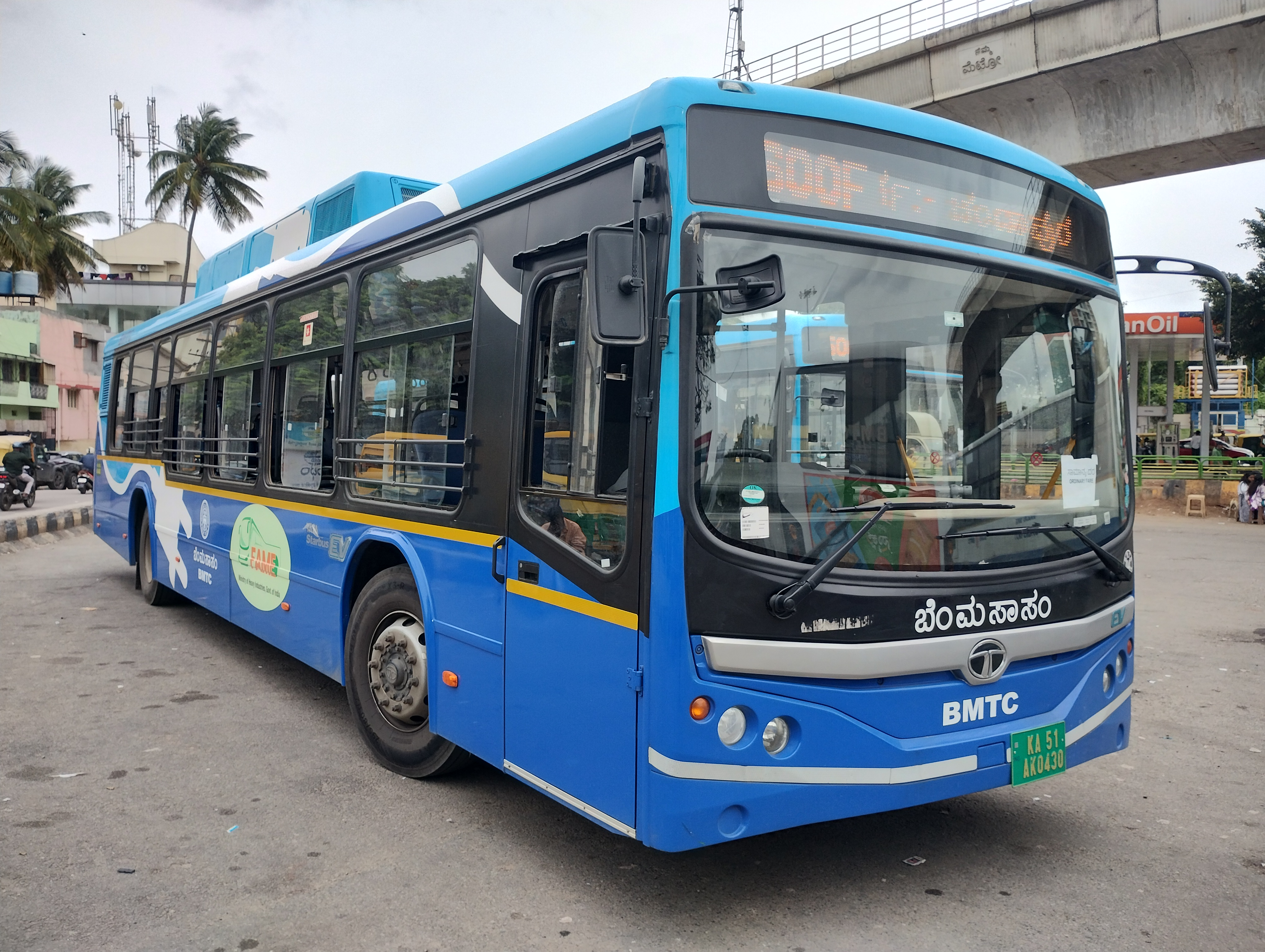
Astra bus in Banashankari TTMC

== See also ==
- Bengaluru Sarige
- Nagara Sarige
- Vajra
