= Jalahalli metro station =

Namma Metro's Green Line metro station

Jalahalli
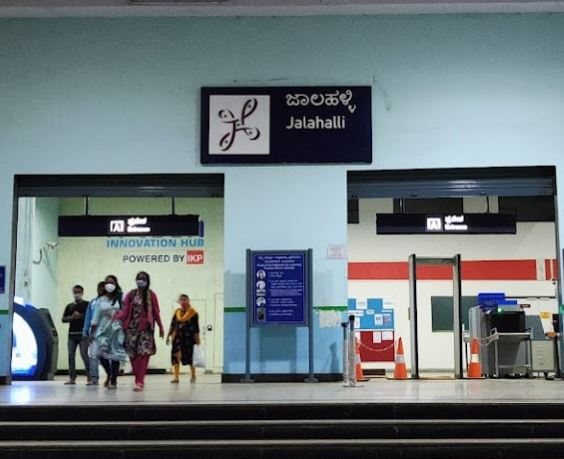
- Jalahalli Metro Station Entrance A

General information
- Location: Bengaluru – Mangaluru Highway, Peenya, Bengaluru, Karnataka 560058
- Coordinates: 13°02′22″N 77°31′11″E
- System: Namma Metro station
- Owner: Bangalore Metro Rail Corporation Ltd (BMRCL)
- Operator: Namma Metro
- Line: Green Line
- Platforms: Side platform Platform-1 → Madavara; Platform-2 → Silk Institute
- Tracks: 2
- Connections: Basaveshwara Bus station

Construction
- Structure type: Elevated, Double track
- Platform levels: 2
- Parking: Available
- Accessible: Yes
- Architect: JMC Projects

Other information
- Status: Staffed
- Station code: JLHL

History
- Opened: 1 May 2015; 11 years ago
- Electrified: 750 V DC third rail

Services
Preceding station	Namma Metro	Following station
Dasarahalli towards Madavara	Green Line	Peenya Industry towards Silk Institute
Route map
Location

Jalahalli is an elevated metro station on the North-South corridor of the Green Line of Namma Metro serving the Jalahalli area of Bengaluru, India. It was opened to the public on 1 May 2015.

== Station layout ==
G	Street level	Exit/Entrance
L1	Mezzanine	Fare control, station agent, Metro Card vending machines, crossover
L2	Side platform | Doors will open on the left
L2	Platform 2 Southbound	Towards → Silk Institute; Next Station: Peenya Industry
L2	Platform 1 Northbound	Towards ← Madavara; Next Station: Dasarahalli
L2	Side platform | Doors will open on the left
L2

== Entry/Exits ==
There are 2 Entry/Exit points – A and B. Commuters can use either of the points for their travel.

- Entry/Exit point A: Towards Jalahalli Cross side
- Entry/Exit point B: Towards Peenya BSNL Customer Service Centre side

== See also ==
- Bengaluru
- List of Namma Metro stations
- Transport in Karnataka
- List of metro systems
- List of rapid transit systems in India
