= Transport in Mysore =

Transport system in Mysore city

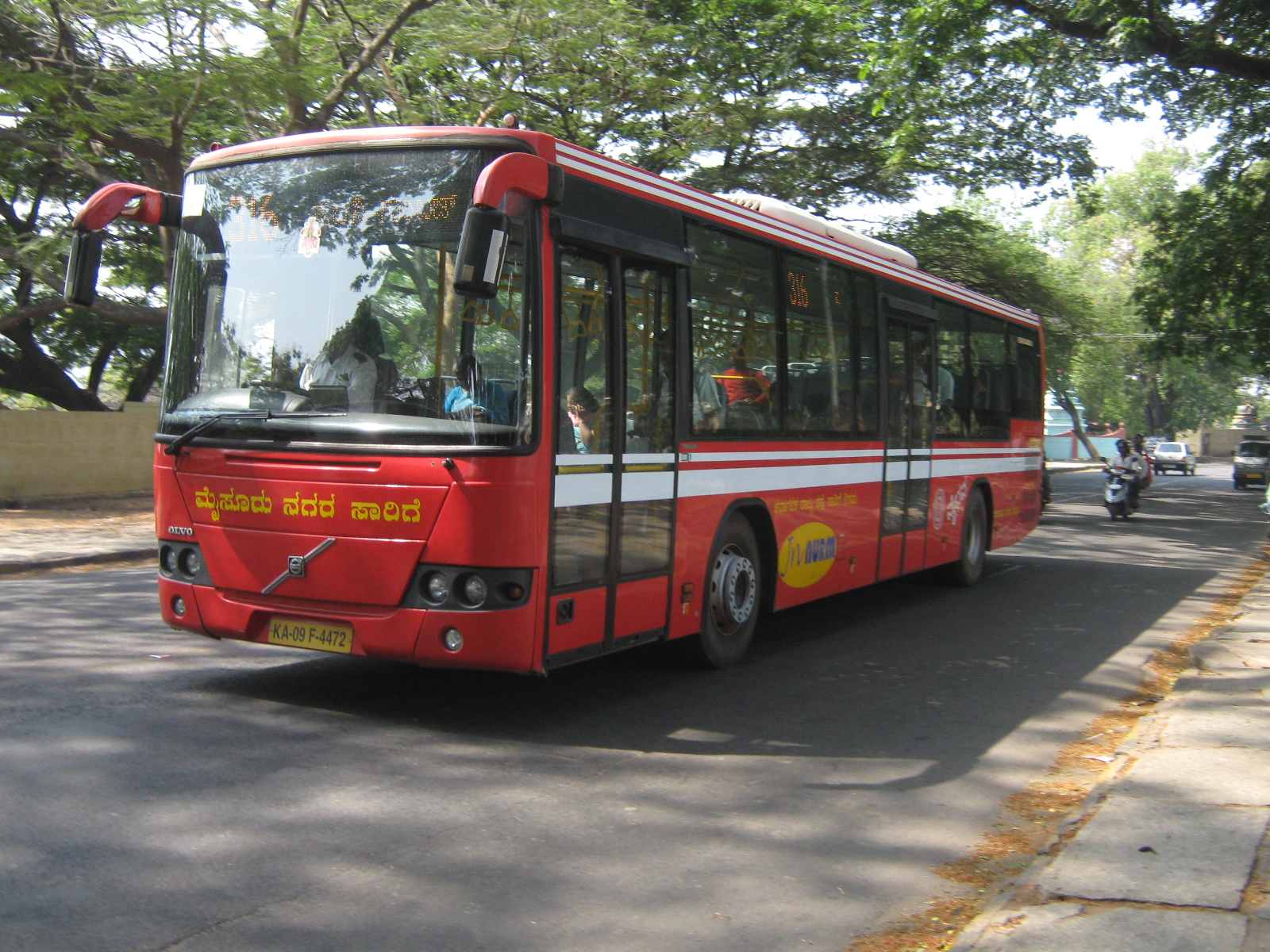
Volvo Bus in Mysore

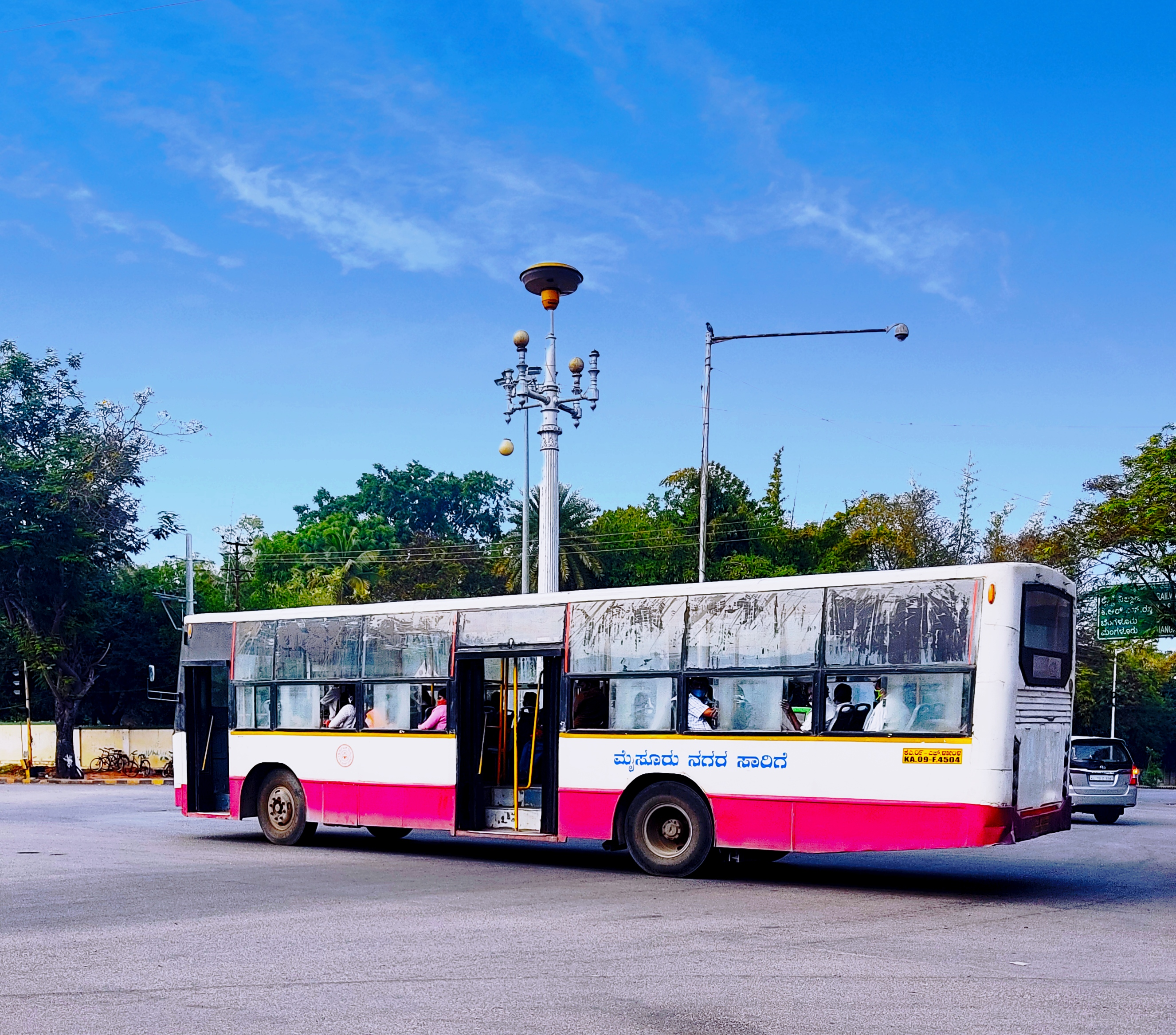
City bus in Mysore

Mysore is one of the most important cities in Karnataka due to its tourism and proximity with the capital city of Bangalore. It is the second largest urban agglomeration in the state of Karnataka. It has a well established road and rail transport with other cities in the country.

== Roads ==
Mysore is connected by National Highway NH-212 Kollegala to the state border town of Gundlupet, where the road forks into the states of Kerala and Tamil Nadu. State Highway 17, which connects Mysore to Bangalore, was upgraded to a four-lane highway in 2006, reducing travel time between the two cities. A project was planned in 1994 to construct a new expressway to connect Bangalore and Mysore. After numerous legal hurdles, it remains unfinished as of 2012. State Highway 33 and National Highway 275 which connect Mysore to H D Kote and Mangalore respectively. Main road links from Mysore are Mysuru – Bengaluru and Ooty, Mysuru – Bannur and Kanakapura, Mysuru - Kollegala, Mysuru - MM Hills and Salem, Mysuru – Hunsur and Mangaluru and Mysuru – Heggadadevana Kote and Manantvady. Mysuru has approximately 2500 km of road network as of 2020. The city has 3 ring road alignments with outer ring road being part of NH275. Important city roads are D.Devraj Urs Road, Sayyoji Rao Road, Irwin Road, Albert Victor Road and Krishnaraja Boulevard.

== Local public transport ==
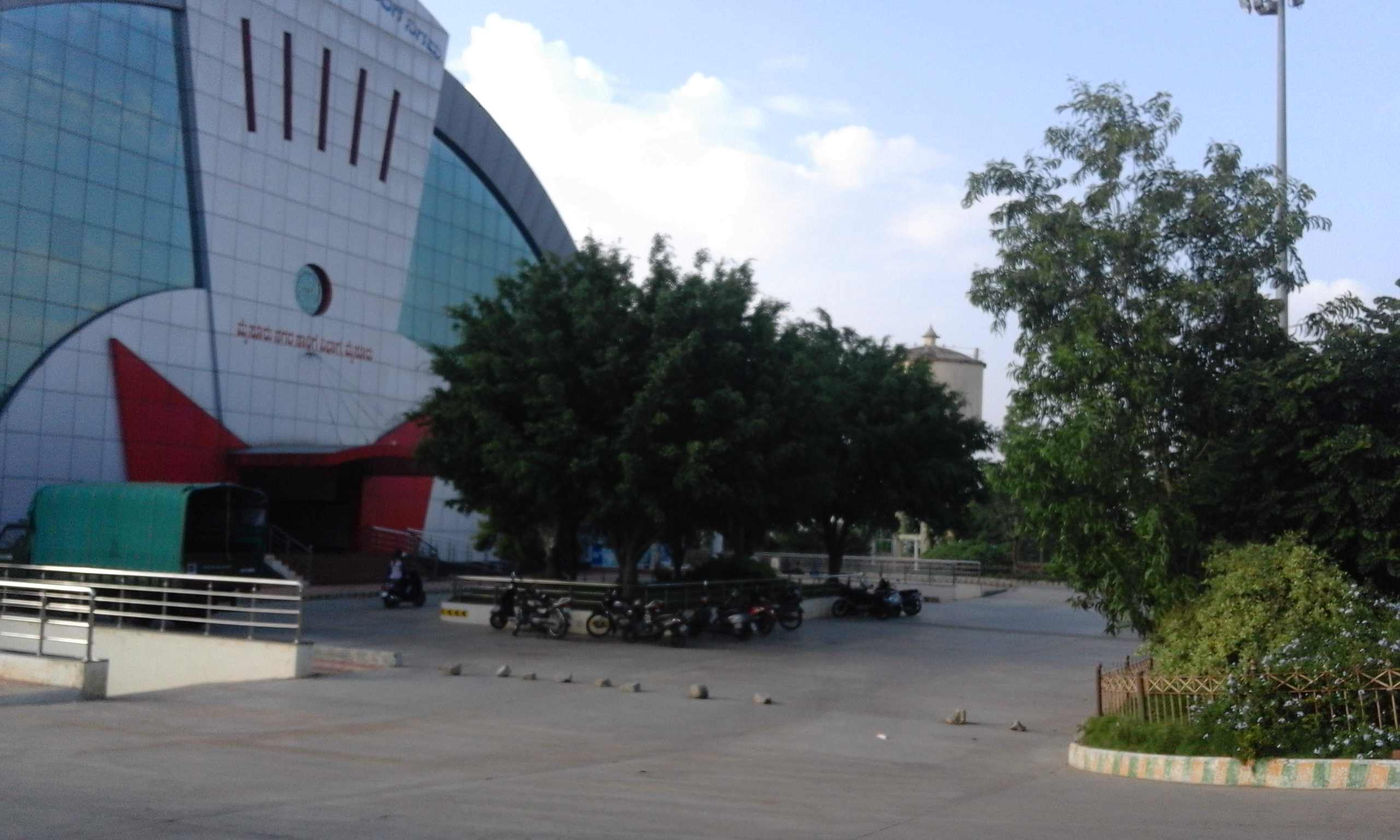
RS Naidunagar Bus Stand

The most popular mode of public transport in the city is KSRTC city buses coming under MCTD Division. Buses are available to all locations in the city as well as villages and towns outside the city. KSRTC MCTD Division has a fleet of around 500 buses. These buses are majorly semi low floor Non-AC city buses. Other buses include AC Volvo buses and older high floor buses. Mysore was the first city in India to implement Intelligent Transport System (ITS) with funding from World Bank. There are 5 IMTC Bus stands in Mysore at Kuvempunagar, Sathgalli, R.S Naidunagar, Yelwala and Chamundi Hills. The main bus stand has 5 bays and 3 bays for suburban busses which ply to towns and villages of the district, Subways and free Wifi facilities.

Within the city, buses are cheap and popular means of transport, auto-rickshaws are also available and tongas (horse-drawn carriages) are popular with tourists. Mysore also has a 42.5-kilometre (26.4 mi) long ring road that is being upgraded to six lanes by the MUDA.

The city has transport services from mobile based taxi services like Ola Cabs, Uber, Jugnoo as well. Also it has mobile based two wheeler taxi Rapido also mobile based self ride two wheeler scooters by Bounce and Vogo four wheeler self ride Zoom cars and many more.

=== Trin Trin PBS ===
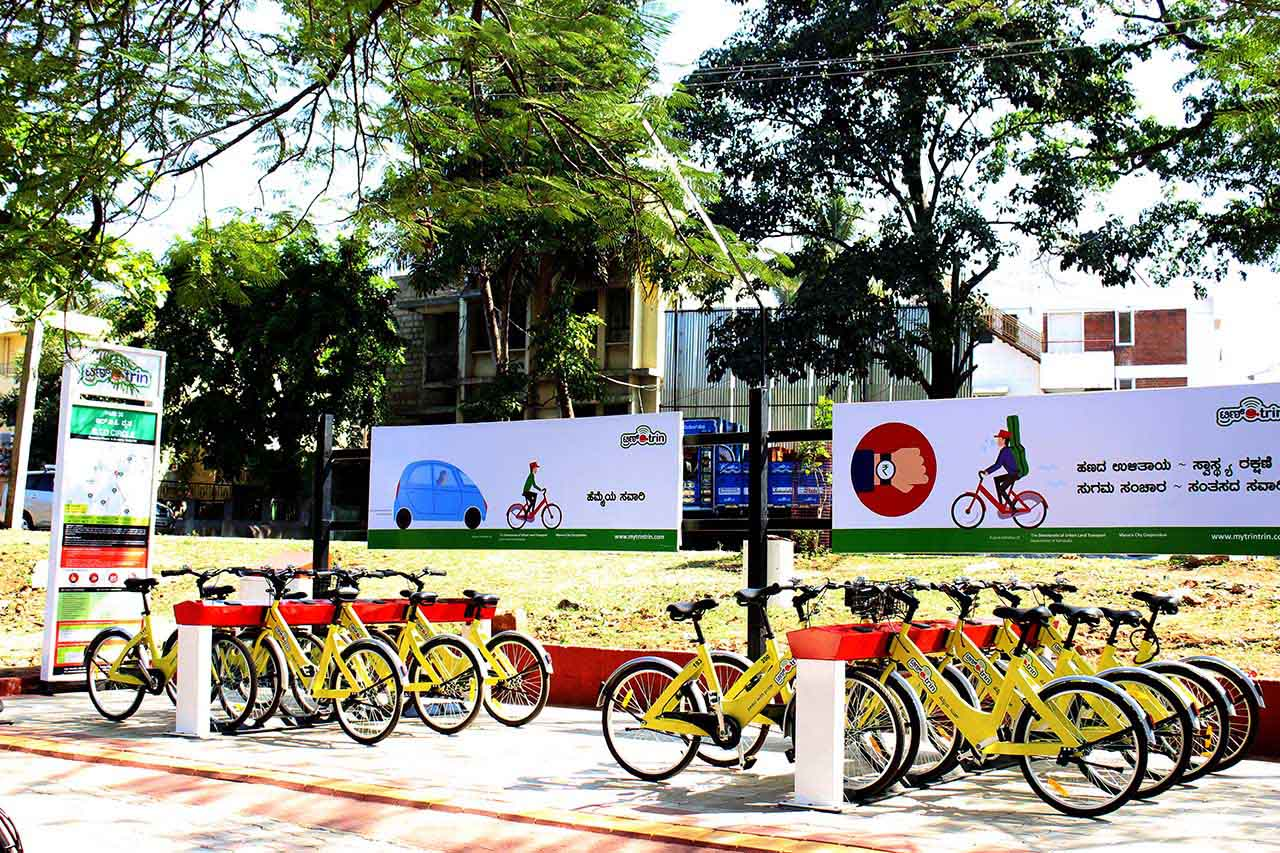
A bicycle docking station

A public bicycle-sharing system, Trin Trin, funded partially by the United Nations is popular mode of transport. It is a government project. It is the first public bike-sharing system throughout India. The key objective of Trin Trin is to encourage local commuters, as well as visitors, to use the bicycle in preference to motorized modes of travel and thereby help scale down the multifarious environmental and road-traffic hazards, enhance conveyance convenience, and make local daily commutes economical for the common citizen.

== Long distance road transport ==
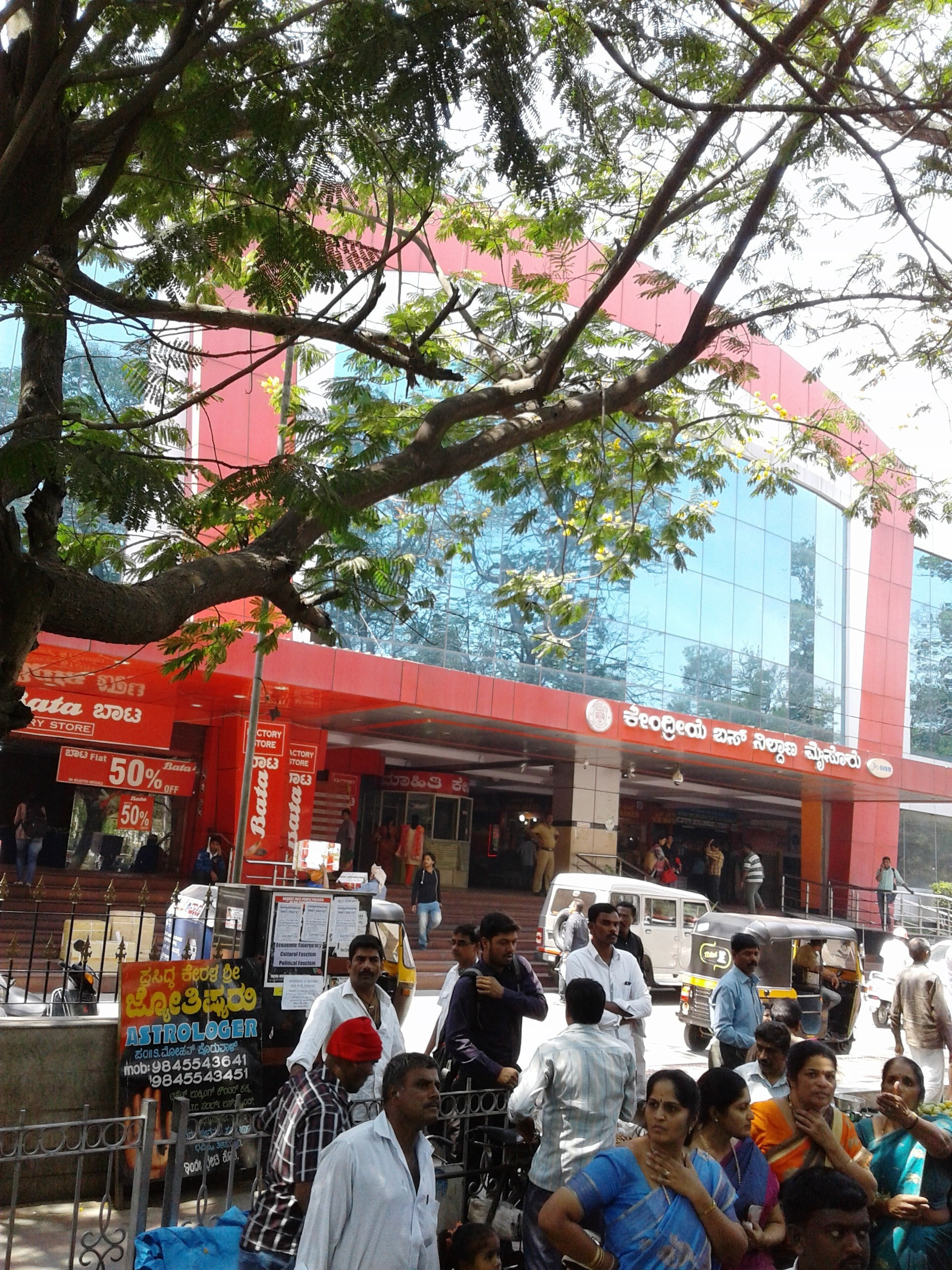
Mysore Rural Bus Stand

Intercity buses are handled by KSRTC. All the intercity buses are operated through the Mysuru Sub Urban Bus Station which is the largest of its kind in Mysore. All kinds of services like Airavat,Airavat Club Class, Rajahamsa Executive Class, Ambaari Class, Standard buses are available to almost every city in the state and some cities in the neighbouring states. There are buses every ten minutes to Bangalore.

The KSRTC Rural Bus stand in Mysore hosts a shopping mall/complex with brands such as Reliance Smart, Reliance Digital etc.

Other private buses are also operated from agencies like SRS Travels, VRL Travels etc.

== Highways ==
The National Highways passing through Mysore are

1. National Highway 275 (India)
2. National Highway 766 (India)
3. National Highway 150A (India)

== Railways ==
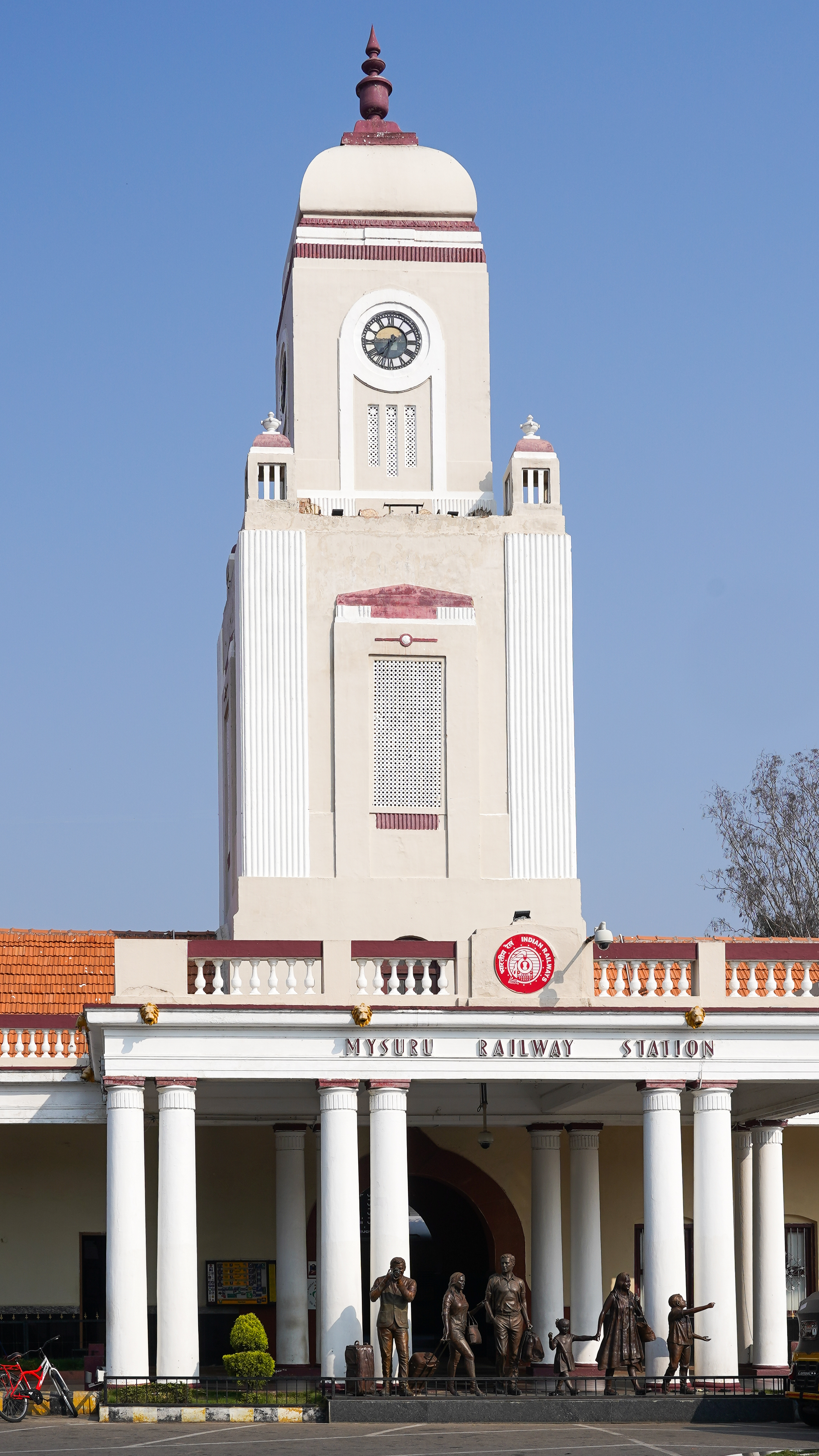
Mysore Junction

Mysore Junction railway station is one of the most important stations in the country. It is the headquarters of SWR Mysore Division. Other railway stations in the city are Chamarajapuram and Ashokapuram. The railway station in Naganahalli Village will be made as satellite railway station to Mysore.

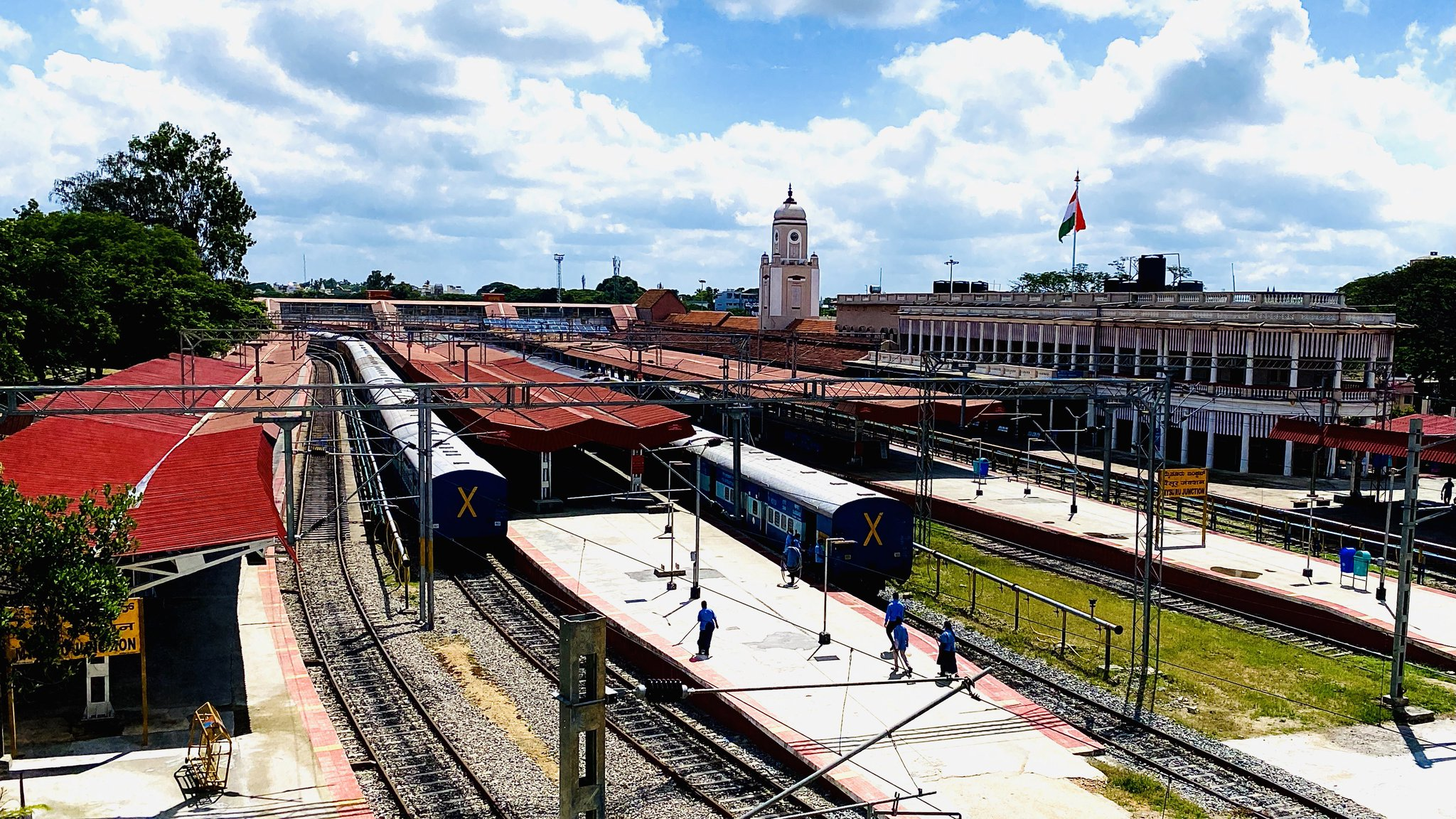
Mysore Railway Station Platforms

Mysore railway station has three lines, connecting it to Bengaluru, Mangalore and Chamarajanagar. Railway lines that connect the city to Chamarajanagara and Mangalore are unelectrified single track and the track that connects to Bengaluru is electrified double track. Fastest train to serve the station is Vande Bharat Express.

== Air ==
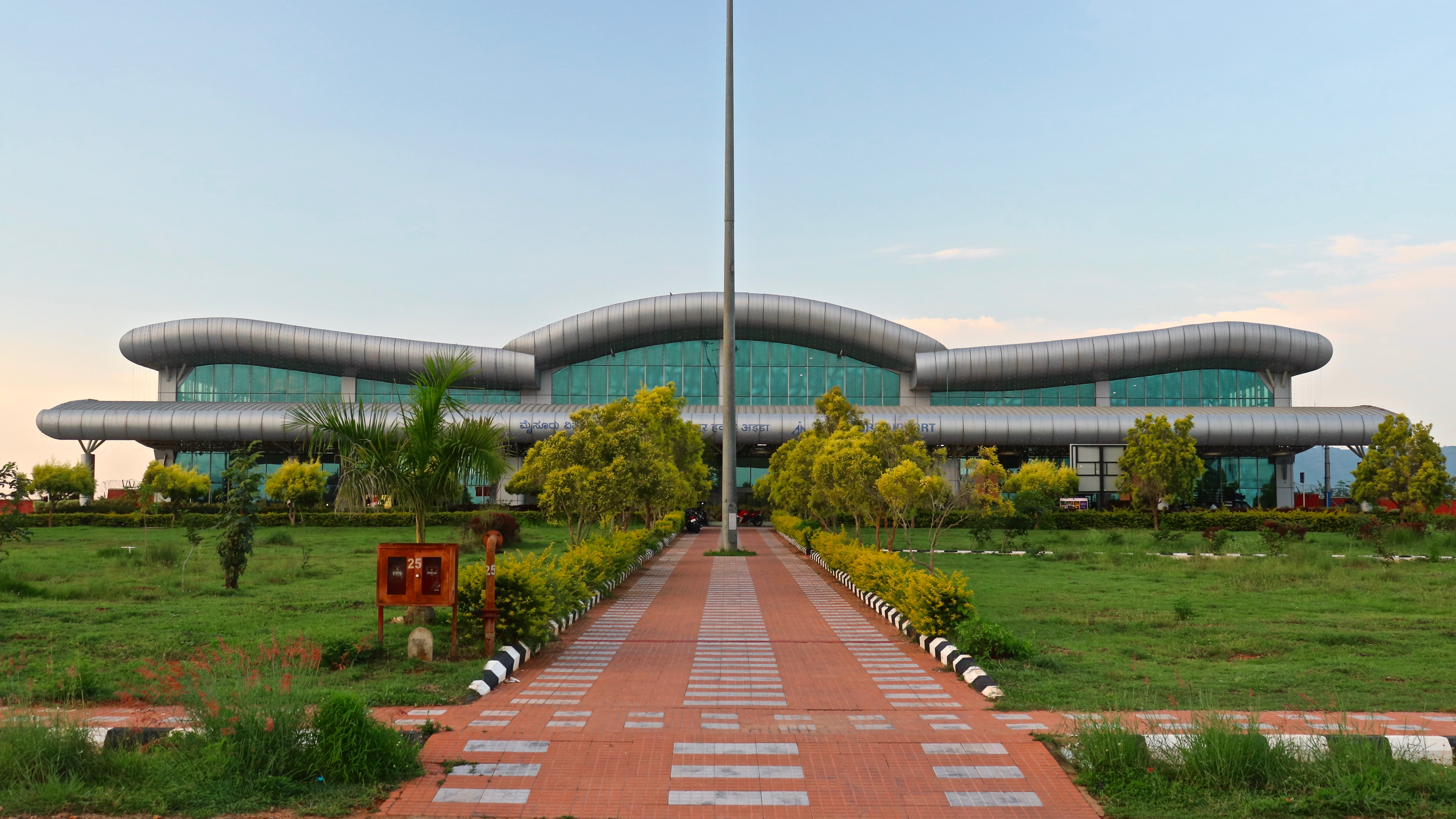
Mysore Airport Terminal

Mysore Airport is a domestic airport that serves the city and is located in Mandakalli village of Mysore. There are daily flights to Kempegowda International Airport Bengaluru, Chennai International Airport, Cochin, Rajiv Gandhi International Airport Hyderabad, Belgaum, Goa Airport and Mangalore International Airport.

Nearest international airport to Mysore is Kempegowda International Airport in Bangalore. Daily FlyBus services are available from Mysore directly to the Bangalore Airport. Flybuses are deluxe multi-axle volvo buses with chemical toilets.

Mysore Airport's passenger terminal occupies 3,250 square metres (35,000 sq ft) and can hold a maximum of 200 passengers. Volvo buses from Mysuru City Bus Stand are available 7 times a day before flight timings.

On 17 May 2018, central government gave permission to the above proposal and as per the plan the existing runway would be expanded to 2750 metres. In 2020, it was announced that government has agreed to upgrade Mysore Airport to International Airport after runway expansion.

== Gallery ==
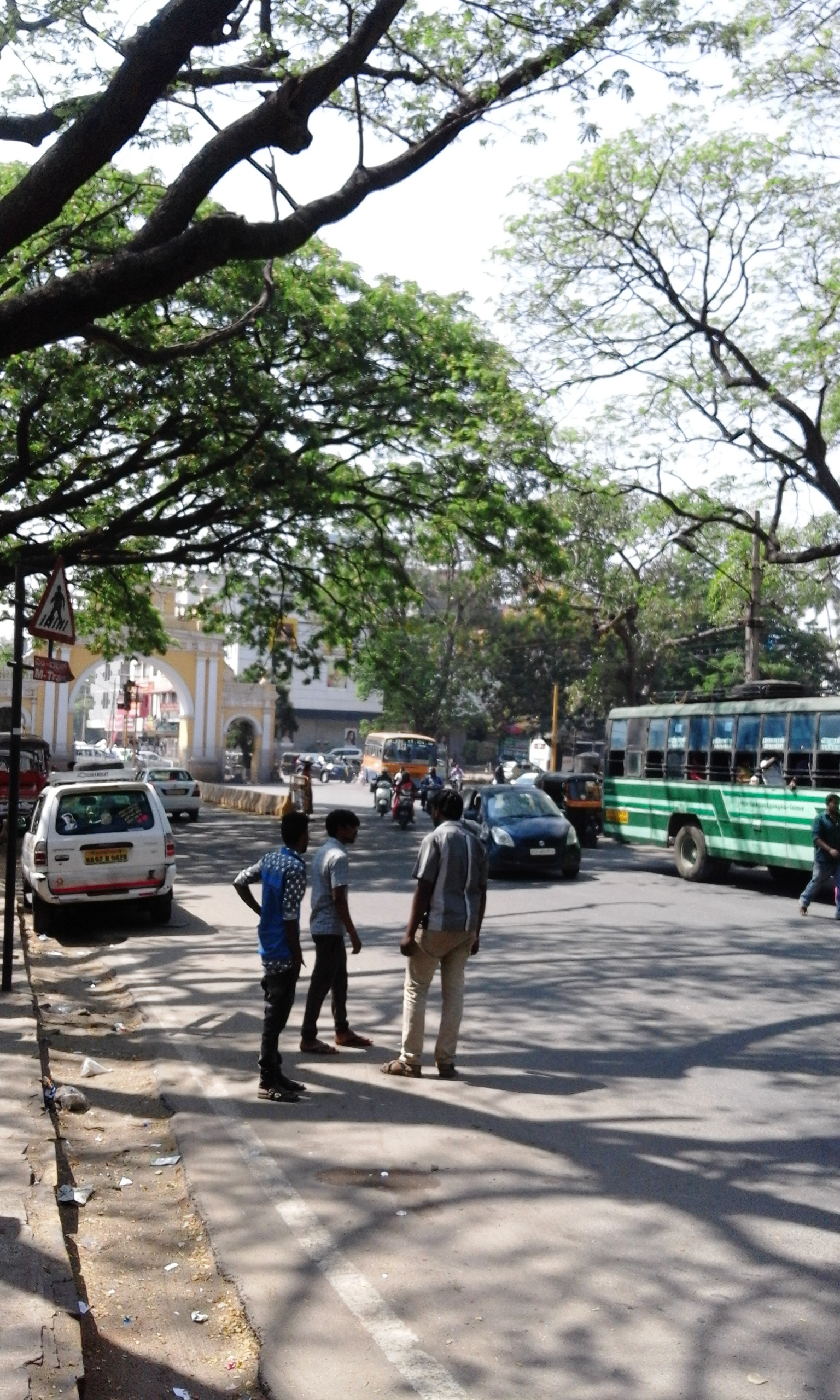

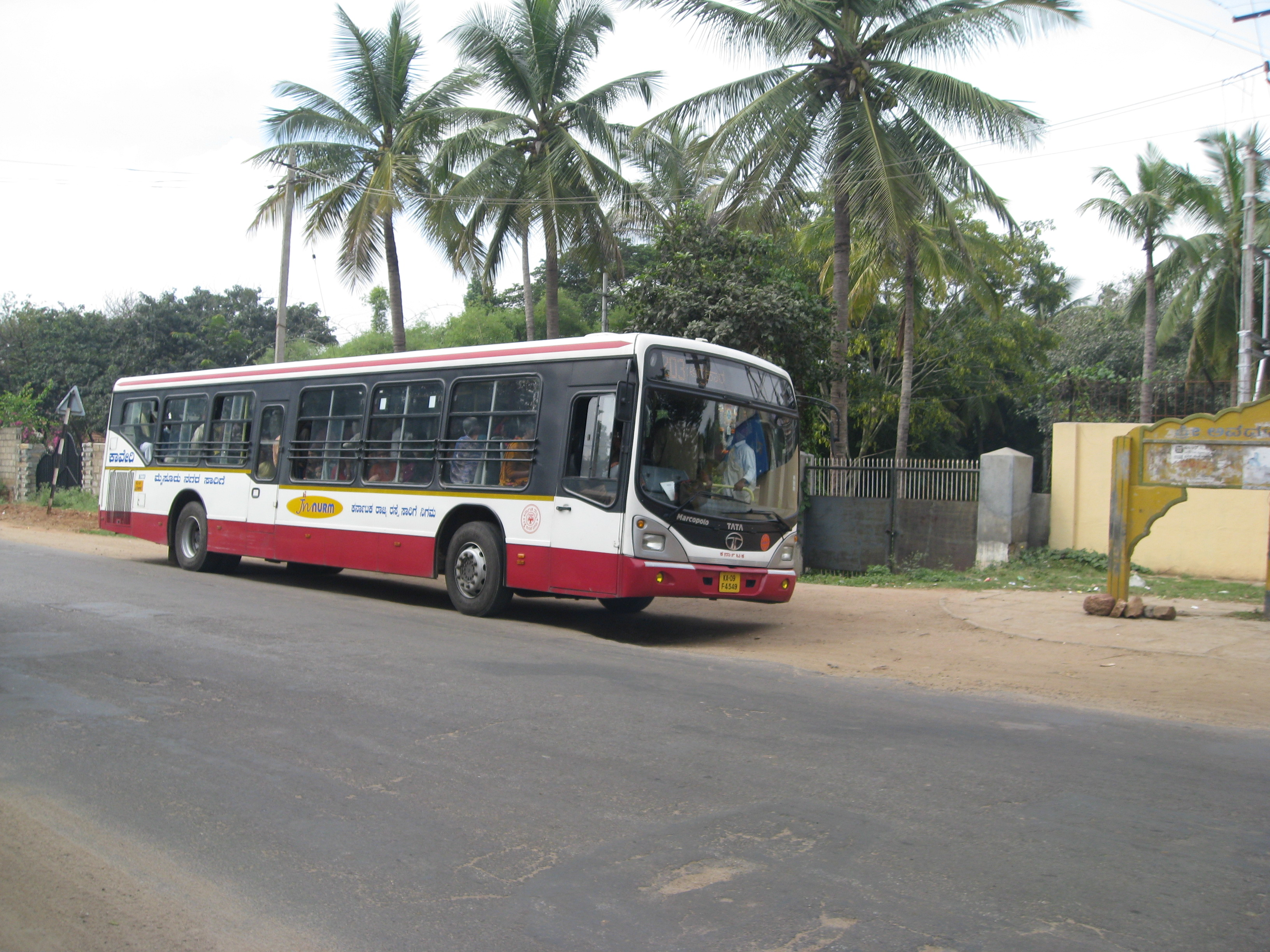

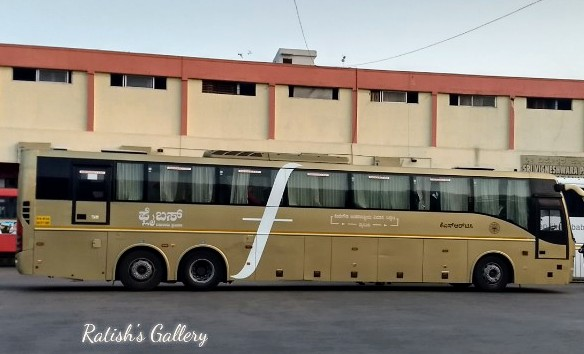

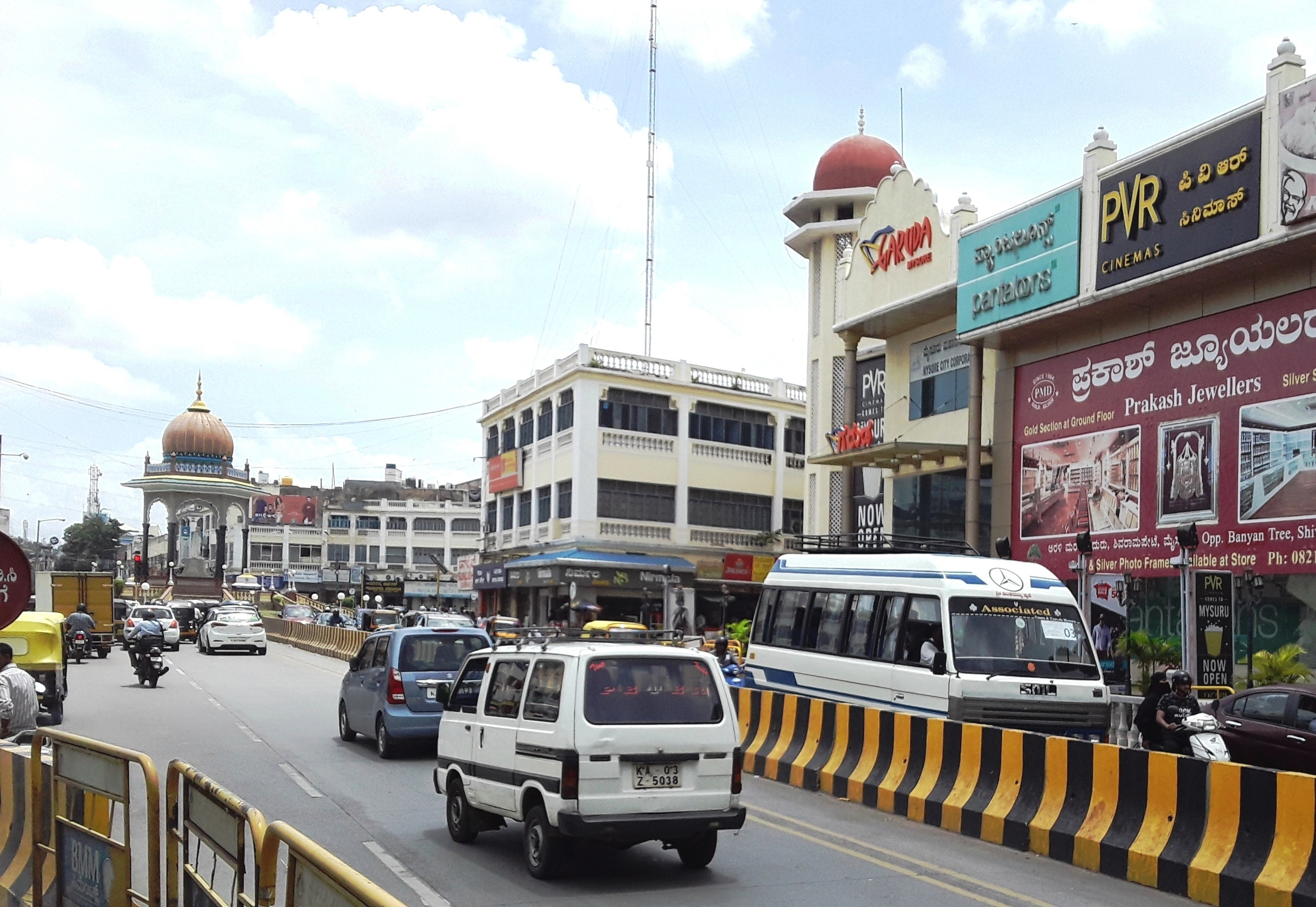

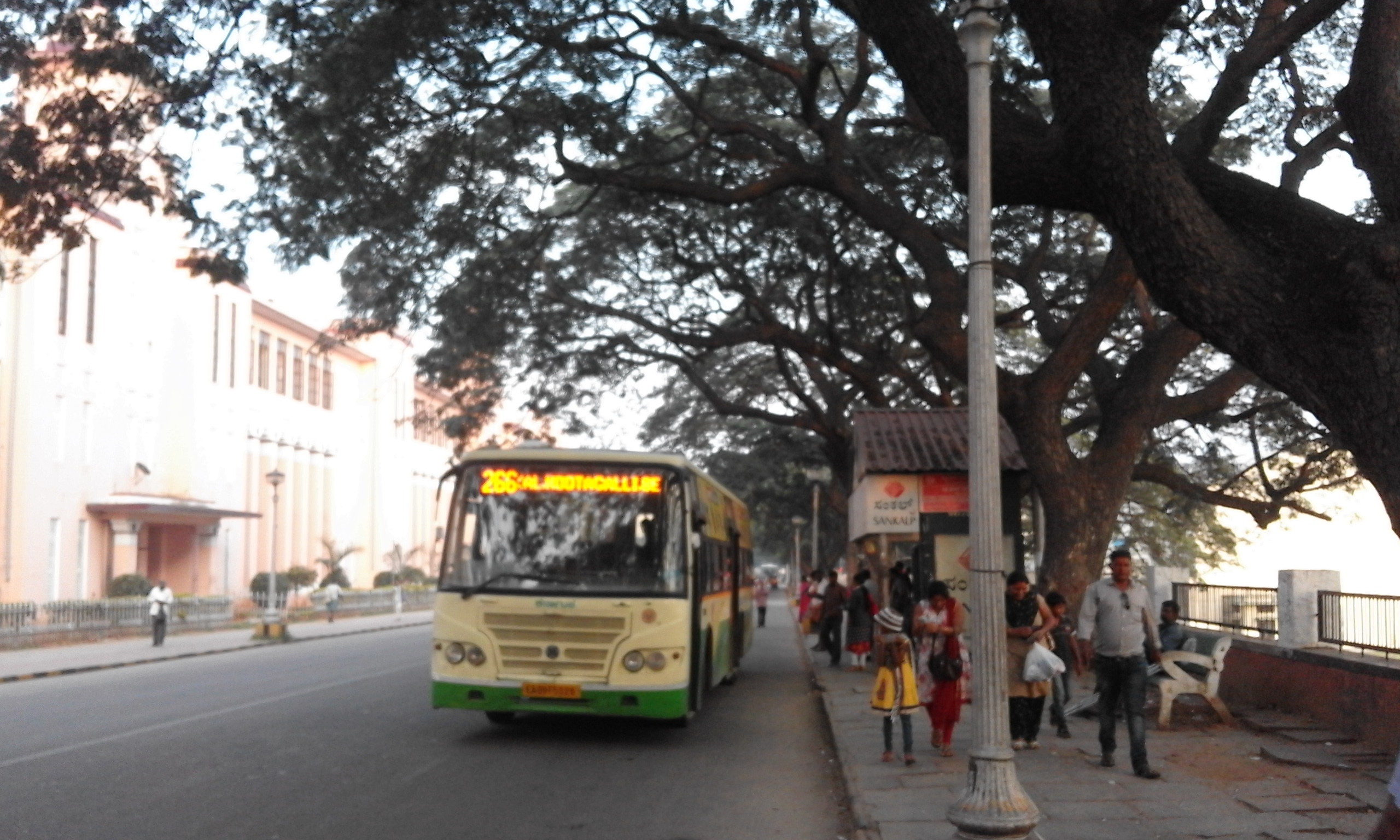

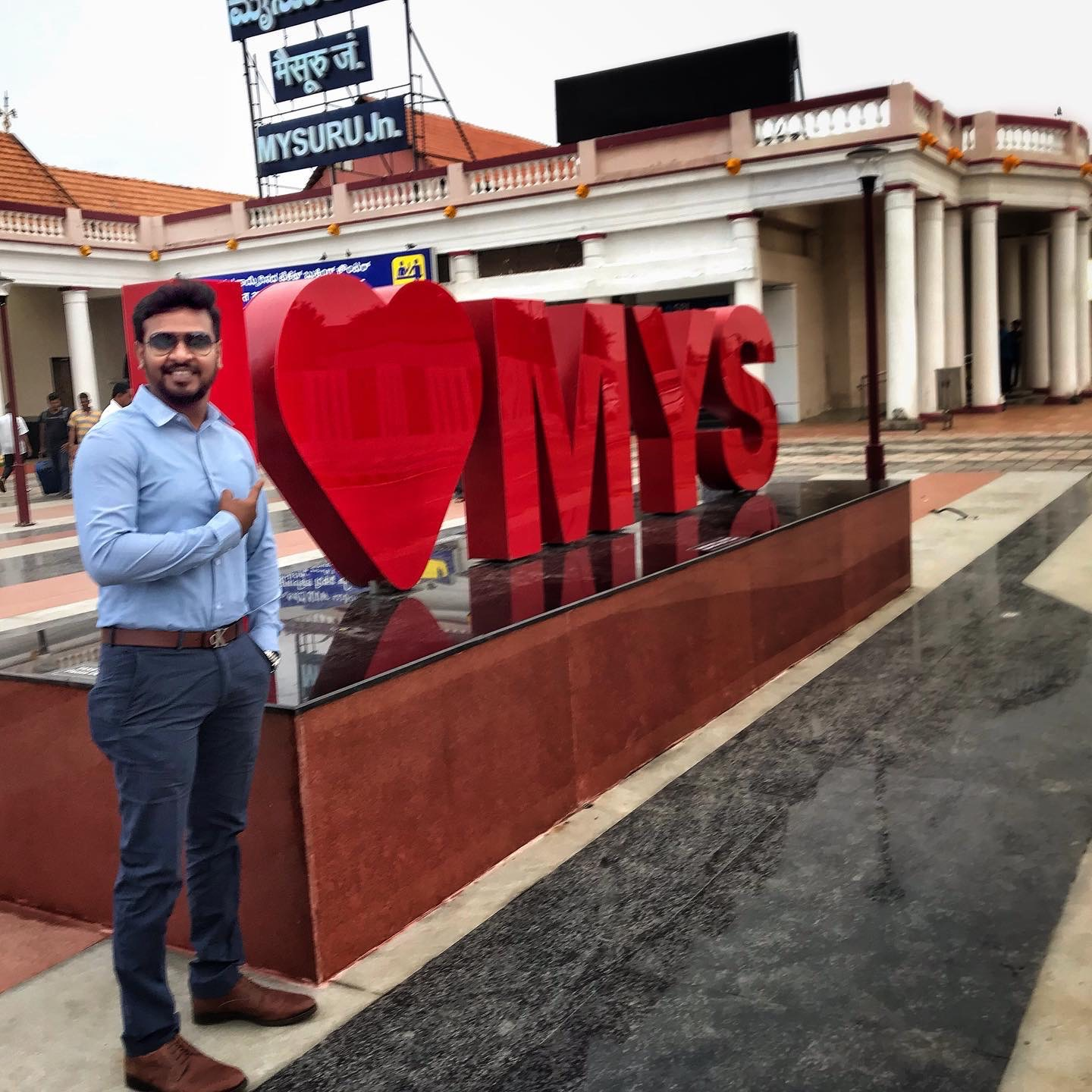

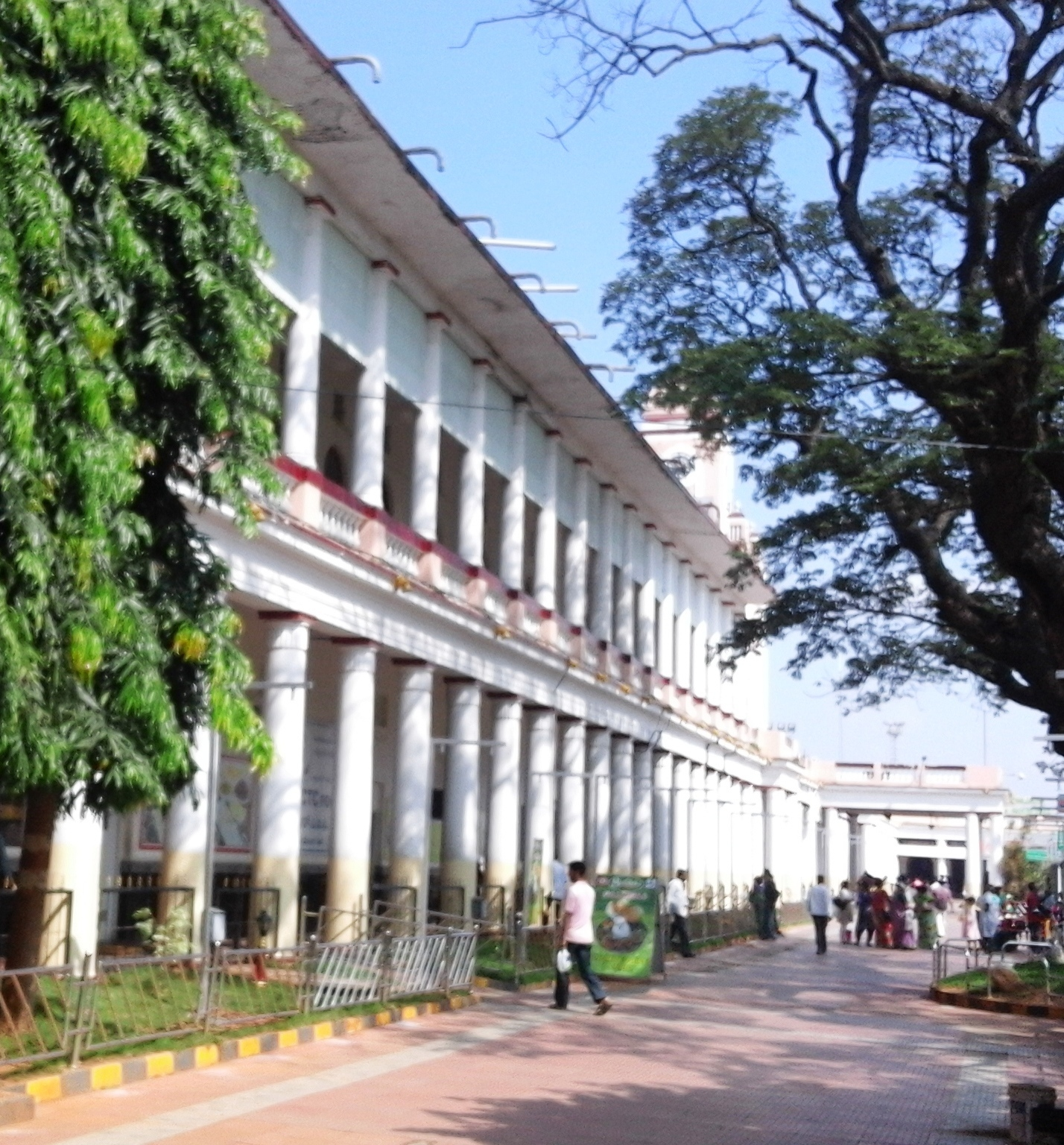

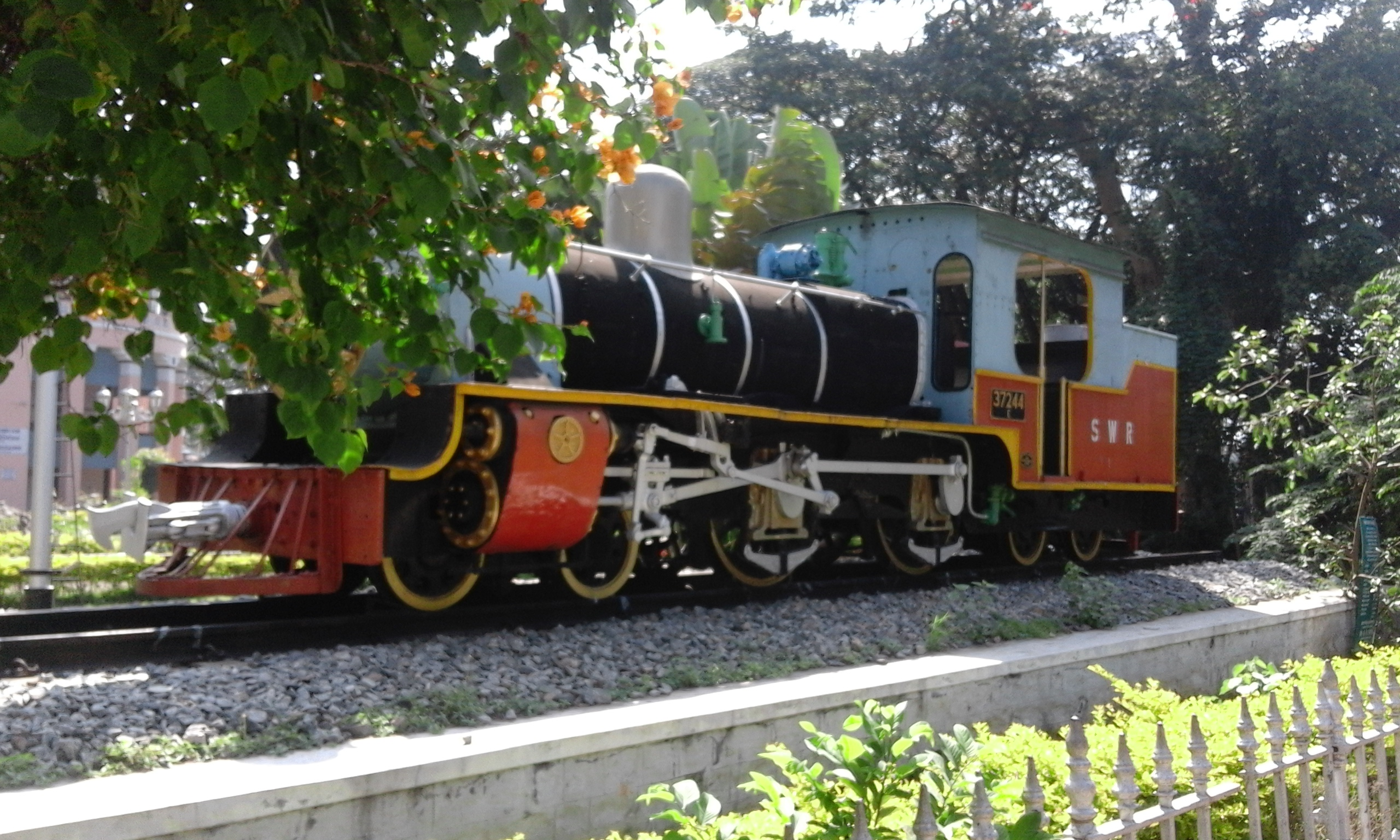

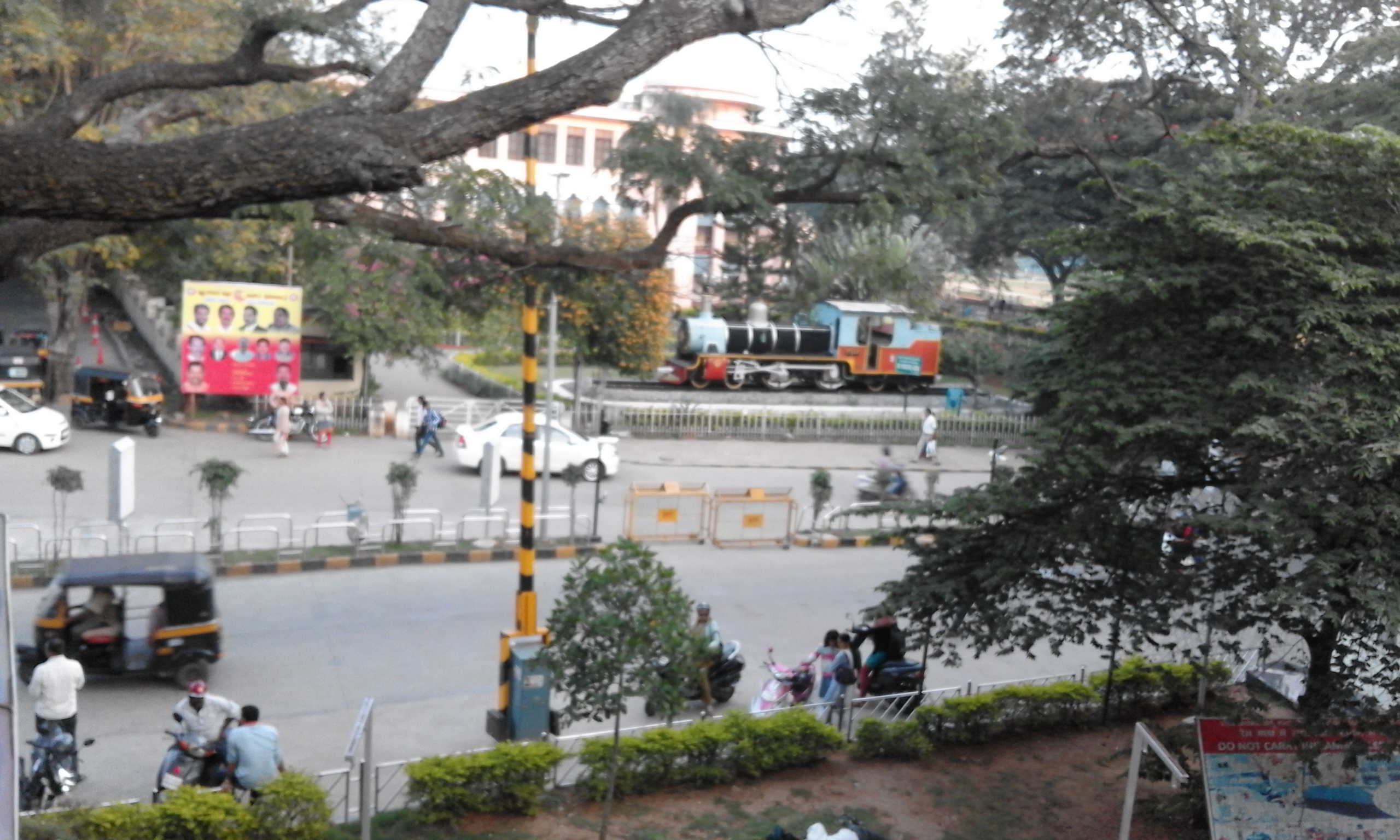

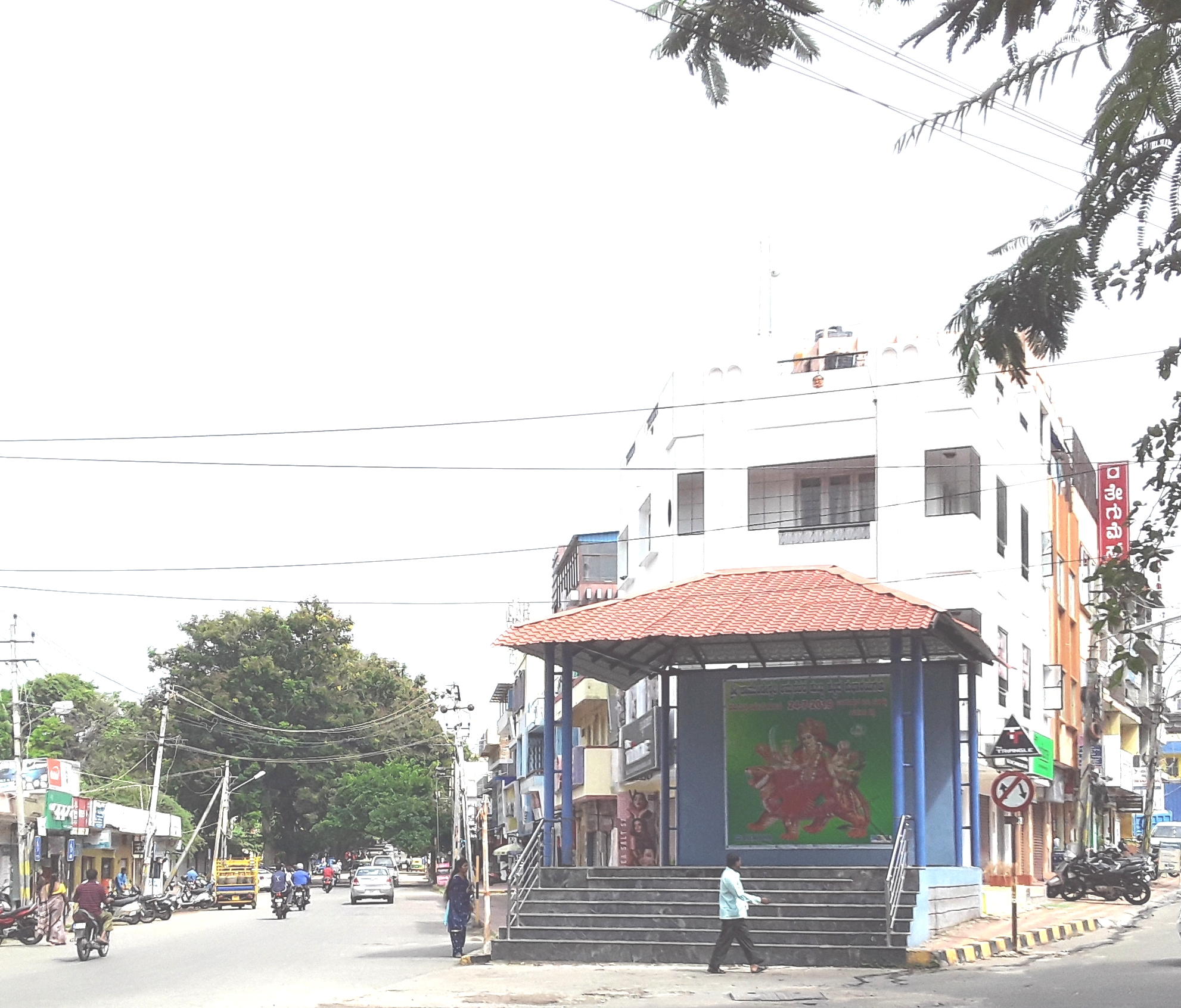

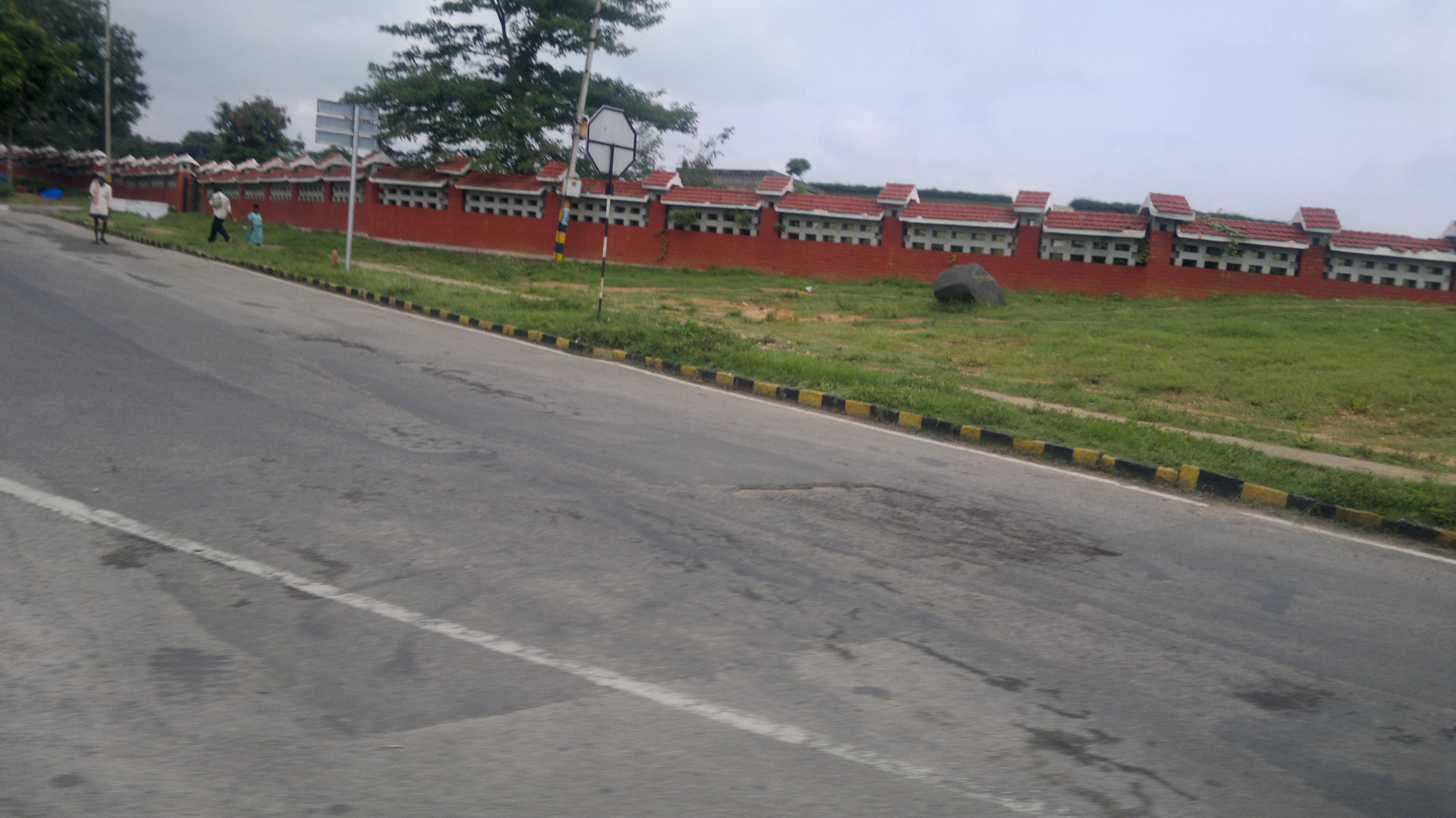

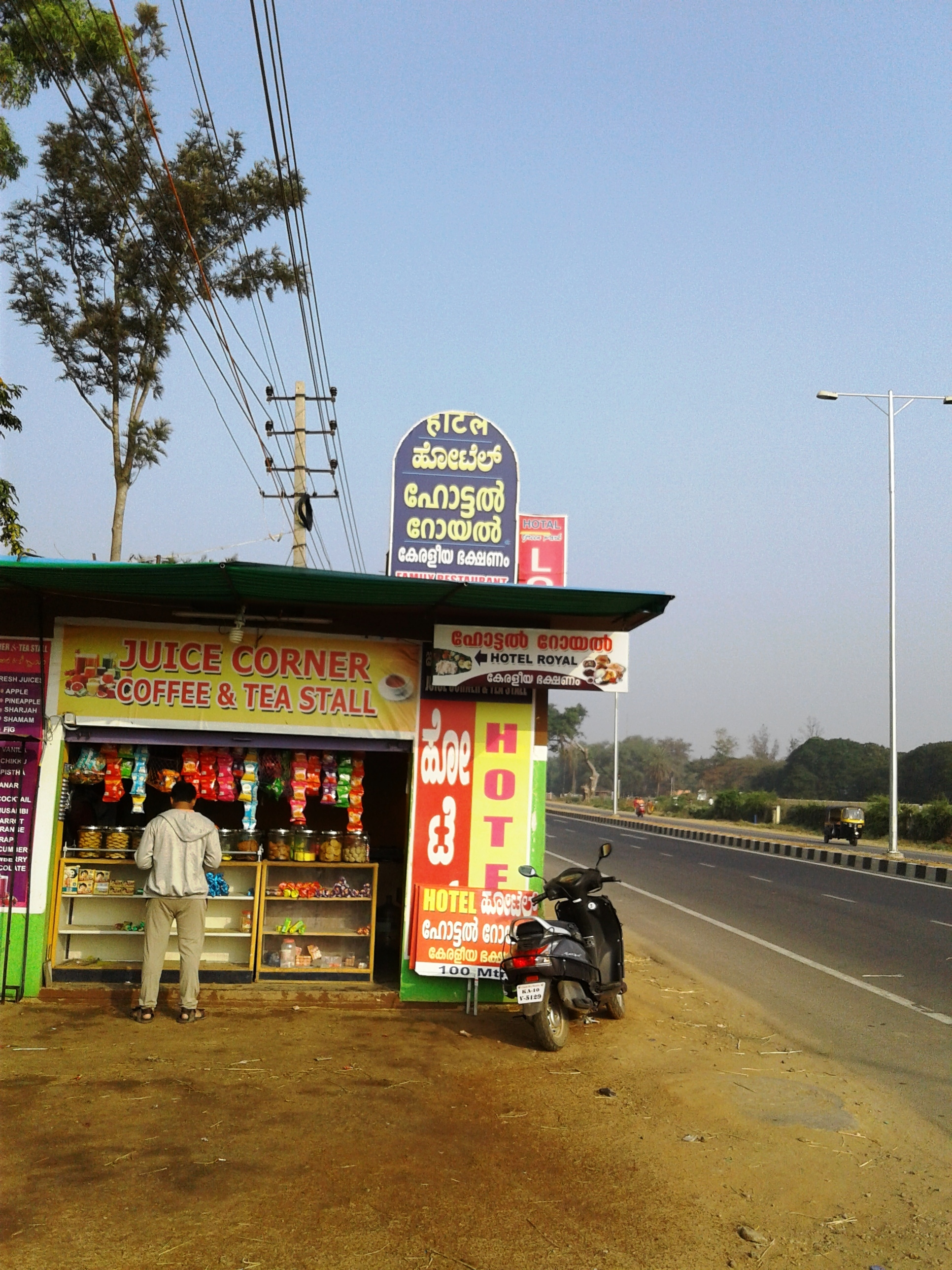

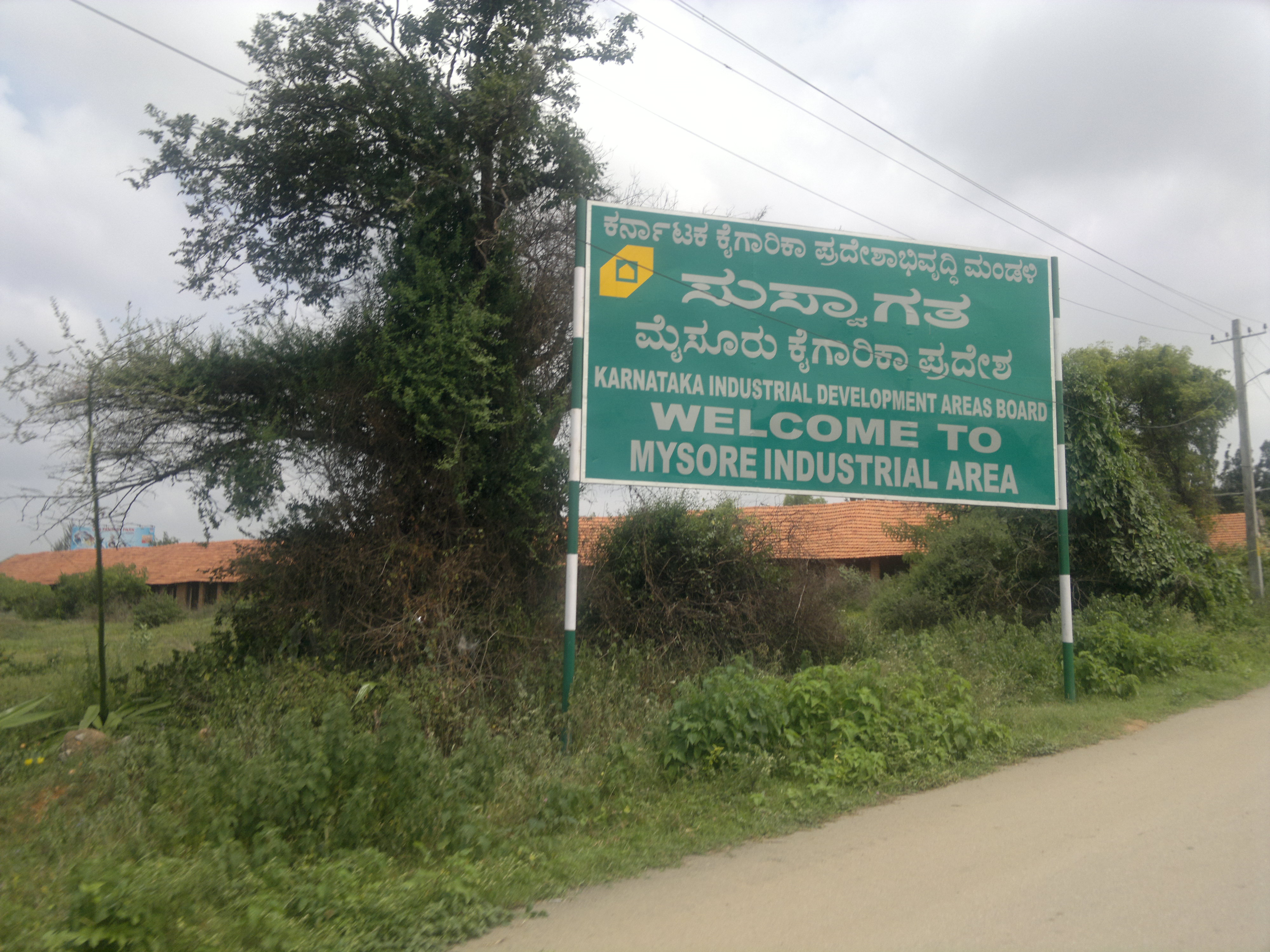

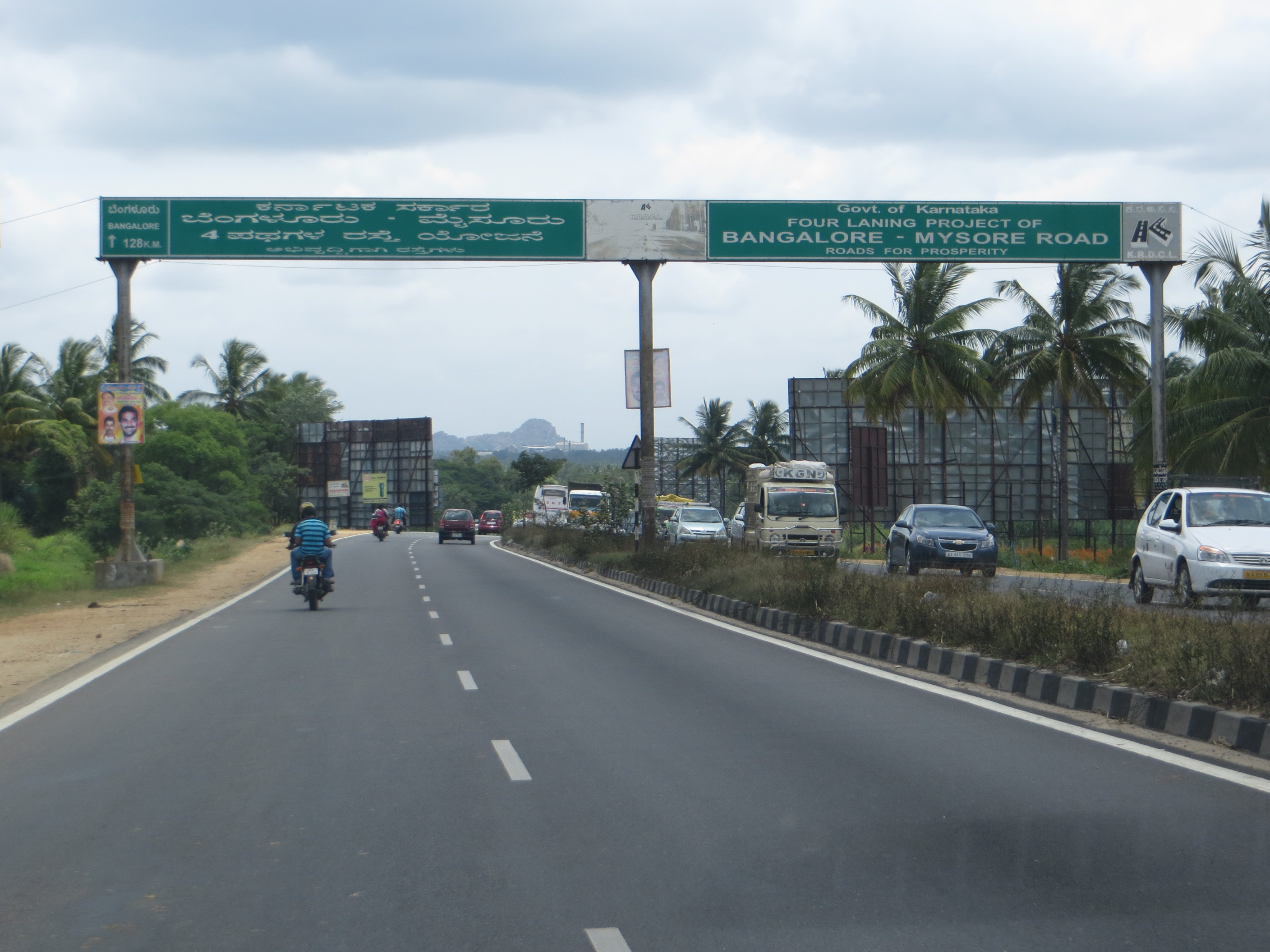

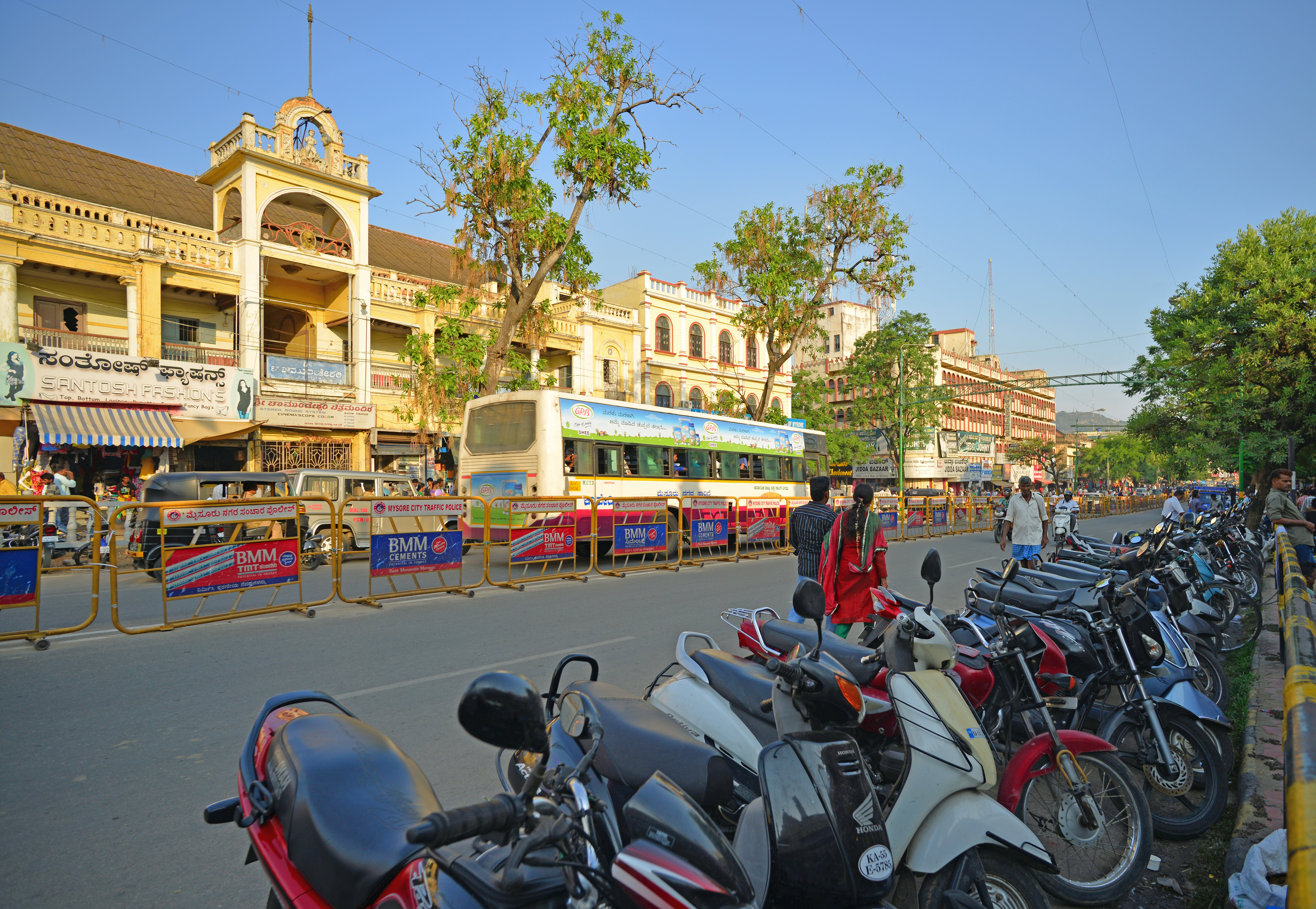

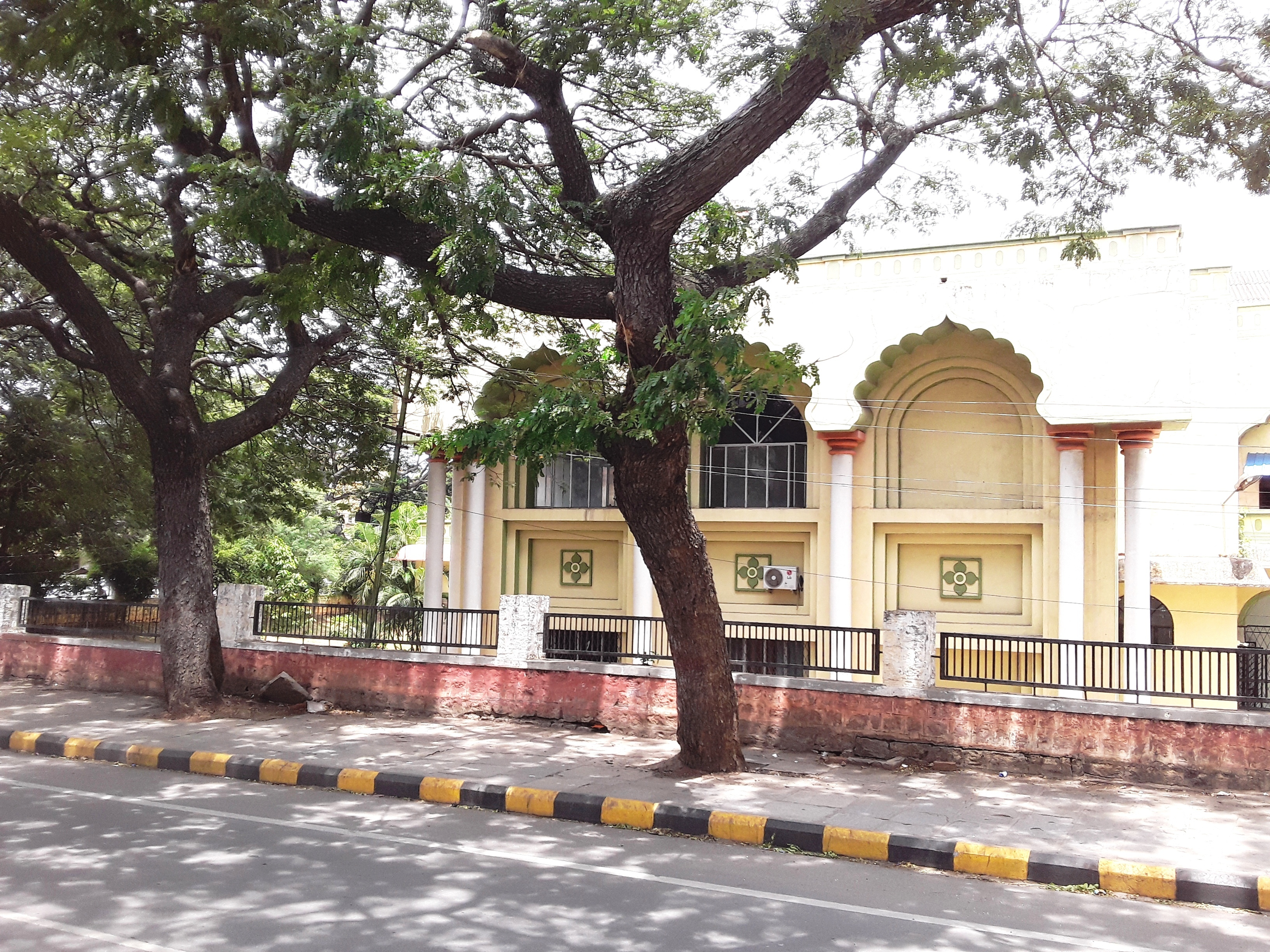

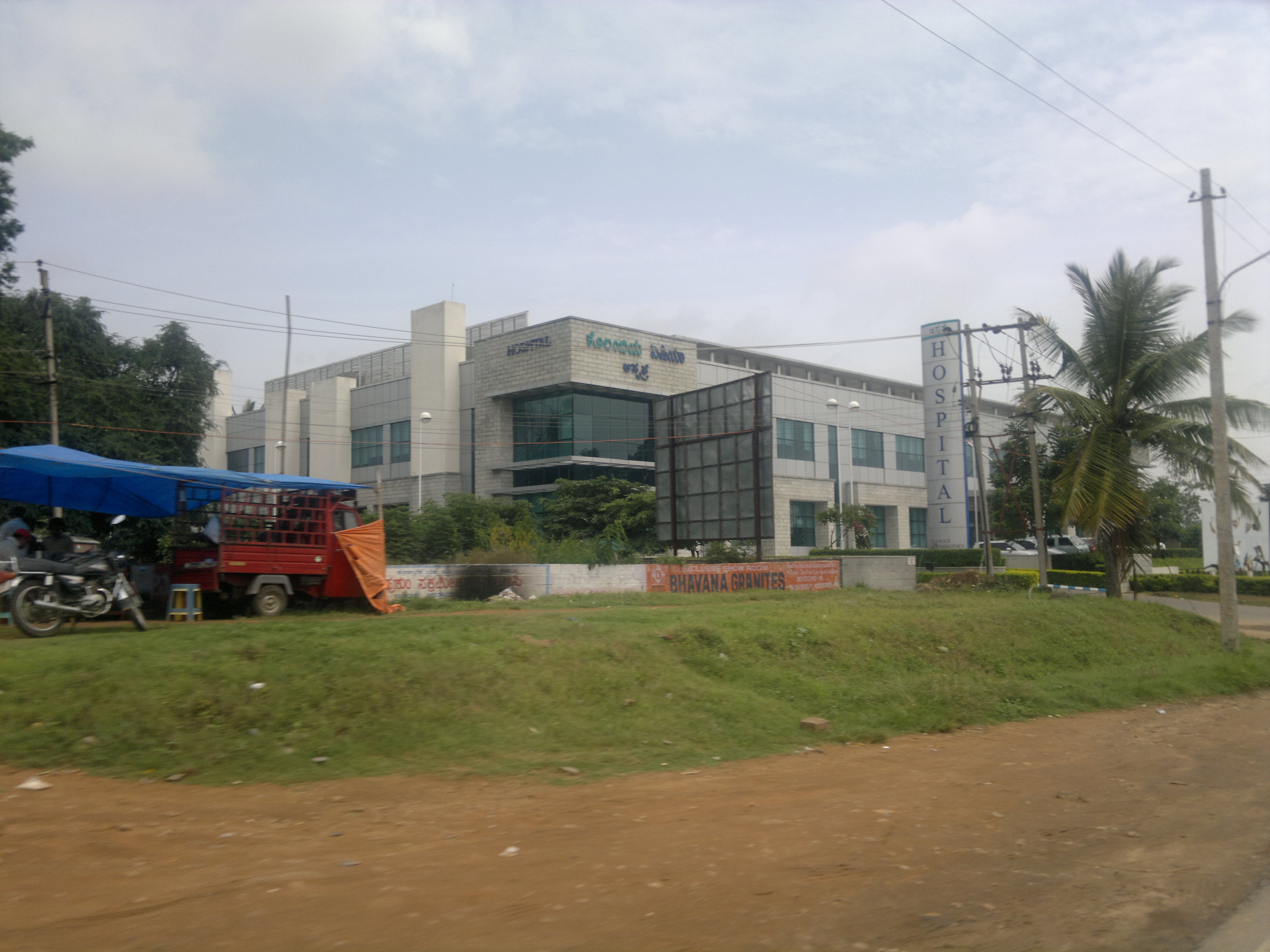

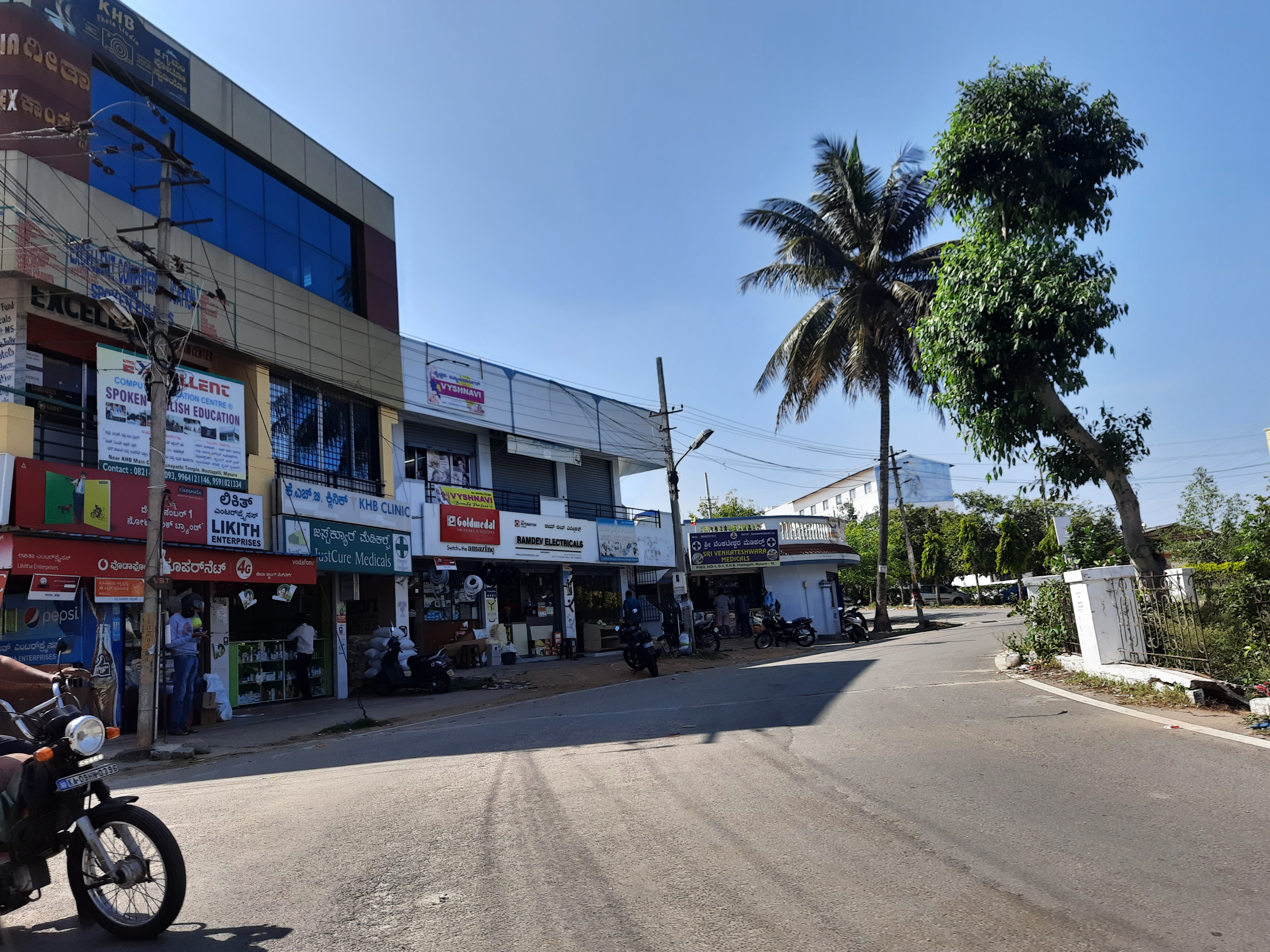

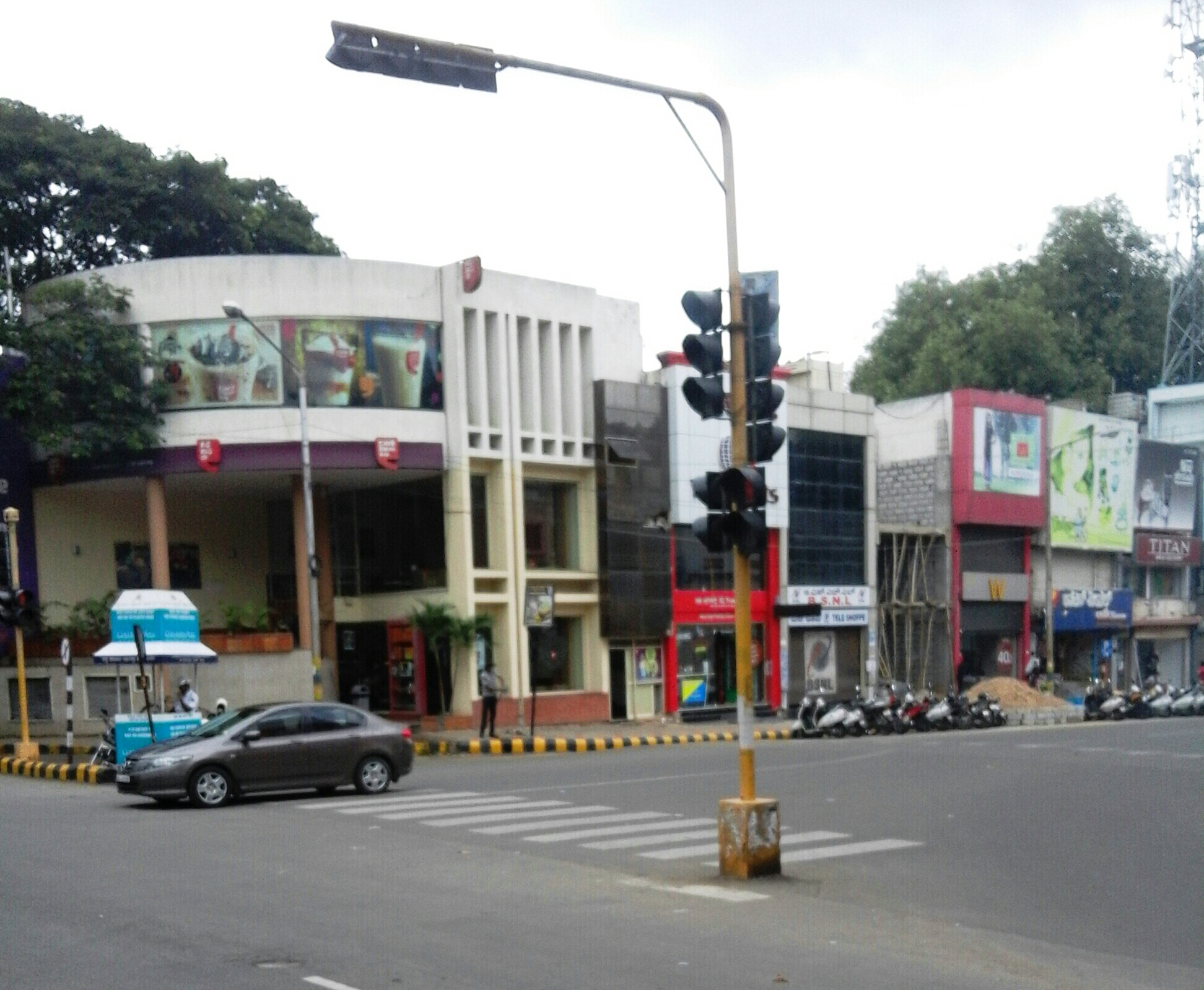

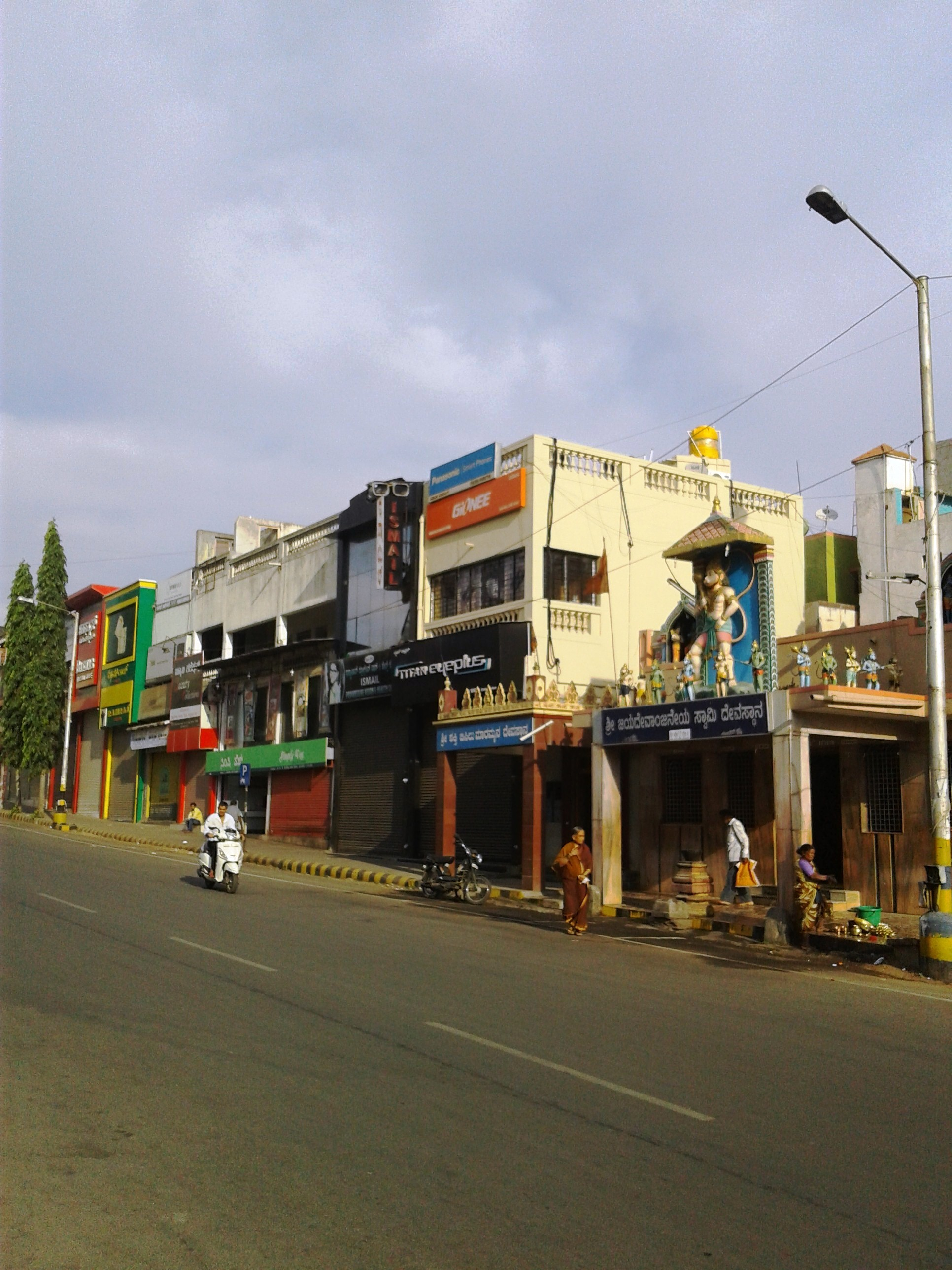

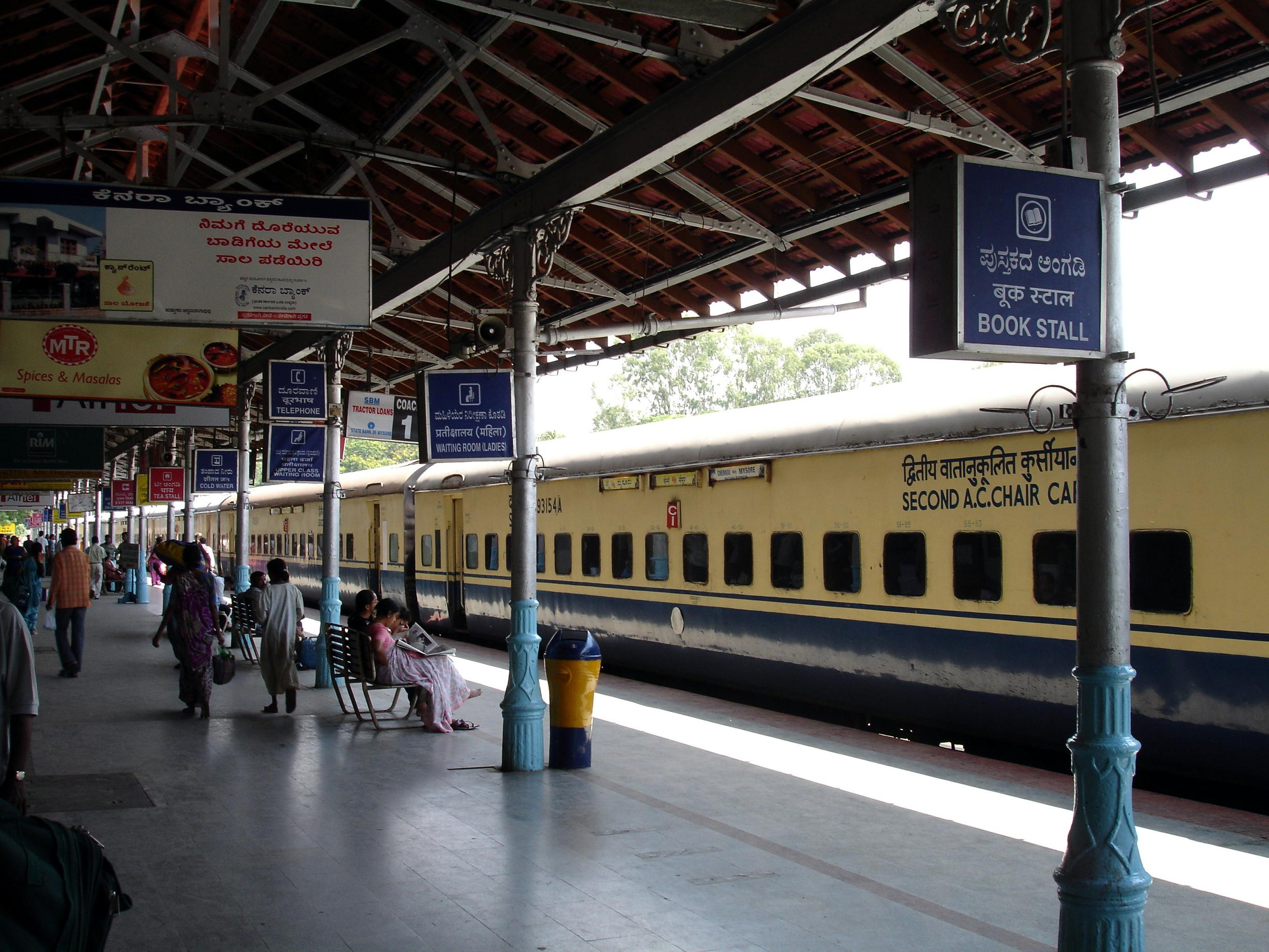

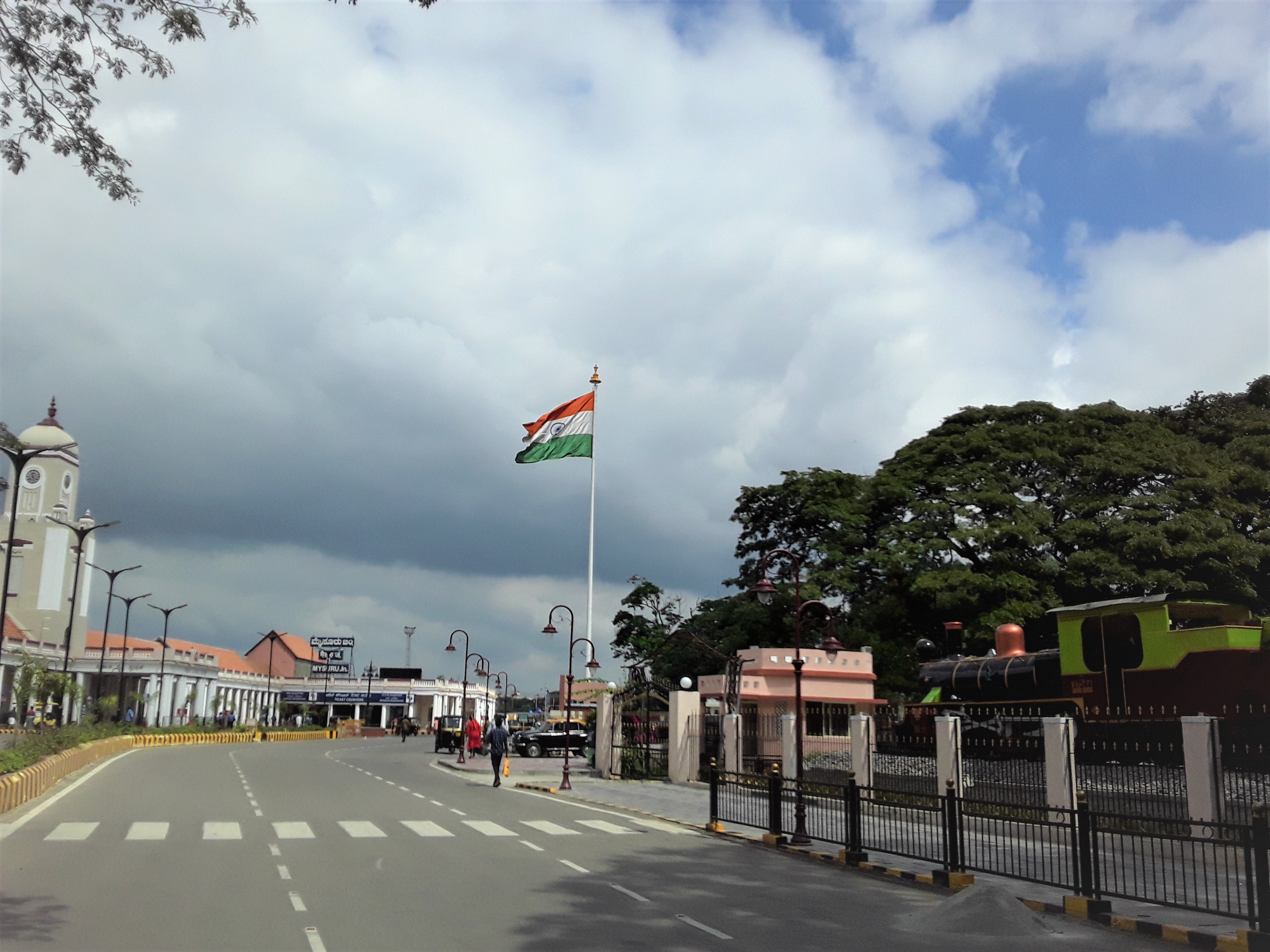
