= Ambaari Utsav Class =

Public bus service in India

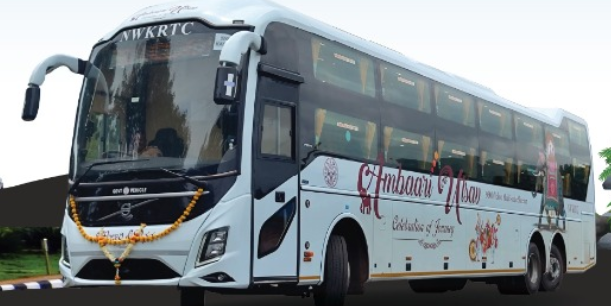
- North Western Karnataka Road Transport Corporation Ambaari Utsav Class
- Parent: Karnataka State Road Transport Corporation,North Western Karnataka Road Transport Corporation
- Founded: 21 February 2023
- Locale: Karnataka
- Service area: Karnataka
- Service type: AC Sleeper Inter-city, Inter-State with Volvo 9600 bus chassis
- Fleet: 40
- Operator: KSRTC,NWKRTC and KKRTC (as Kalyana Ratha) (all under Government of Karnataka)
- Website: ksrtc.karnataka.gov.in/en
- predecessor: Ambaari Dream Class

Ambaari Utsav Class (Kannada: pavilion mounted on the back of an elephant specially used in Mysore Dasara) is a series of Volvo 9600 AC-Sleeper bus service operated by Karnataka RTC's(Ksrtc and NWKRTC)

== History ==
It was launched on February 21, 2023, by then chief minister of Karnataka, Basavaraj Bommai, at Vidhana Soudha,Bengaluru.

== Description ==
It is a Luxury AC-Sleeper service which is operated by KSRTC, NWKRTC.It has 2+1 lower and upper berth sleeper seats2+1. It consists multi-axle volvo bus.Its successor is Ambaari Class(Ni-axle Ac sleeper bus in Corona chassis) and Ambaari Dream Class(Built by prakash and mg builders on volvo chassis) . It is replacing Sleeper services like Ambaari Class(in KSRTC and NWKRTC) and Ambaari Dream Class(in KSRTC). Kalyana Ratha(Which is operated by KKRTC) is a similar class like Ambaari Utsav but operated by sister company of KSRTC.

== Gallery ==
Ambaari Utsav bus in Bejai bus stand

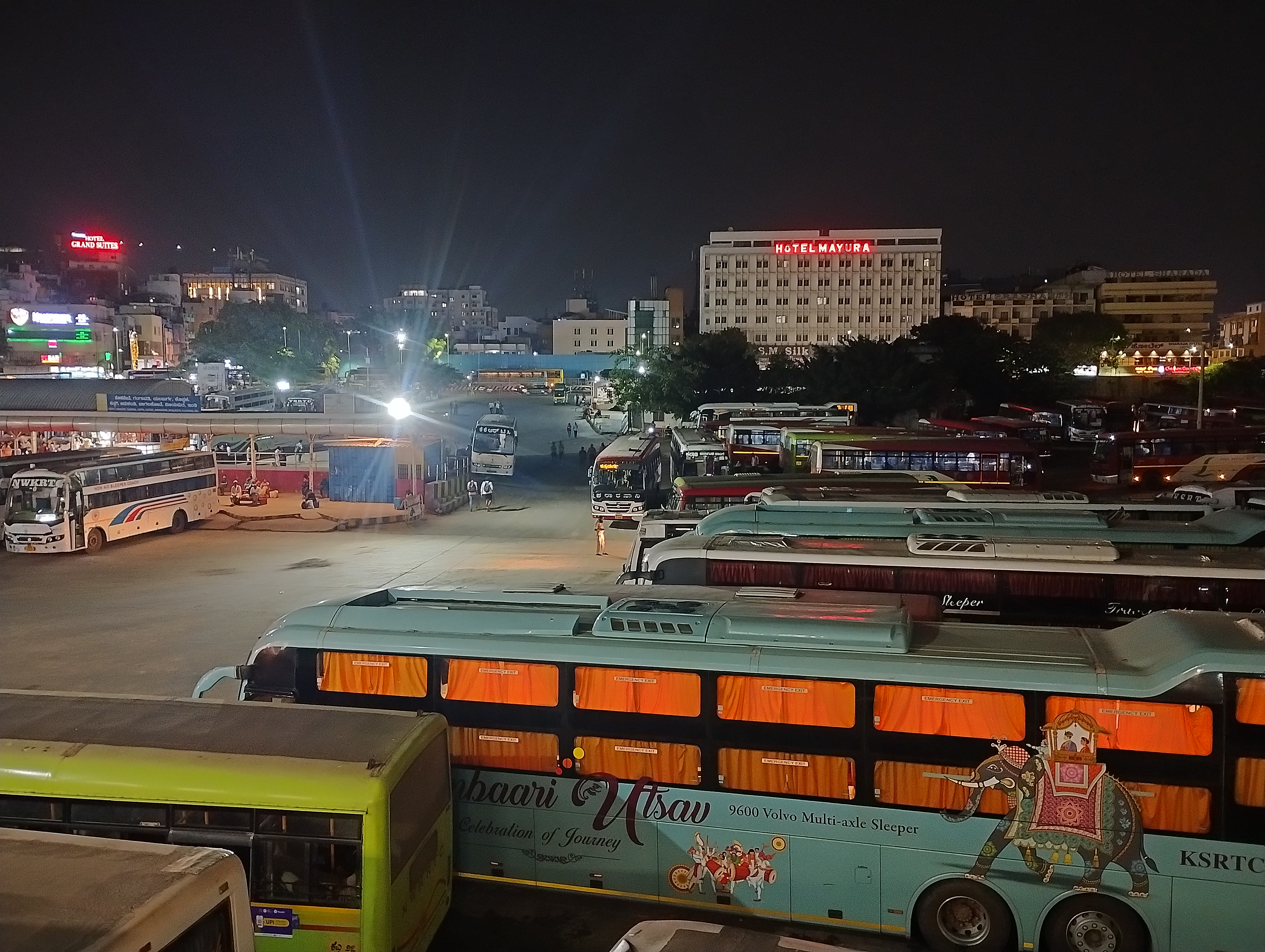
Ambaari Utsav in Kempegowda Bus Terminal 1

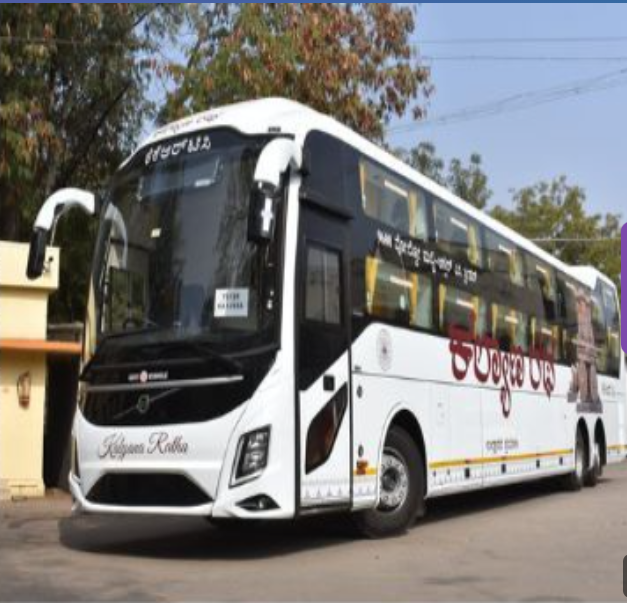
Ambaari Utsav inspied bus service of Kalyana Karnataka Road Transport Corporation called Kalyana Ratha

== See also ==
- Ambaari Class
- Airavat Club Class
