= Ambaari Dream Class =

Public bus service in India

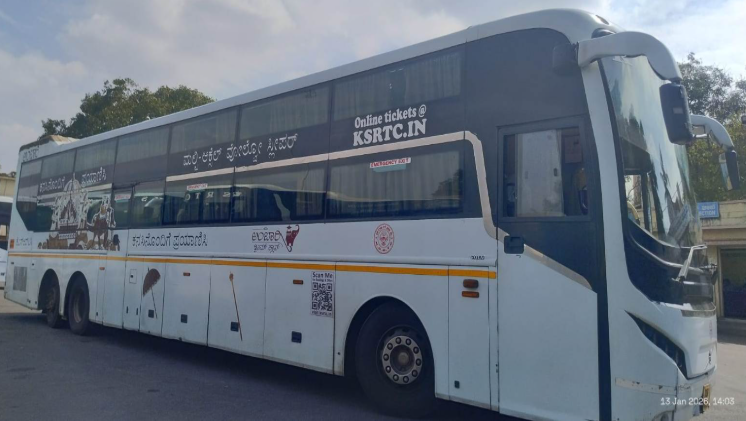
- KSRTC'S Ambaari Dream Sleeper Class
- Parent: Karnataka State Road Transport Corporation
- Founded: 11 April 2019
- Locale: Karnataka
- Service area: Karnataka
- Service type: AC Sleeper Inter-city, Inter-State with Volvo 9600 bus chassis
- Fleet: 24
- Operator: KSRTC
- Website: ksrtc.karnataka.gov.in/en
- predecessor: Ambaari Class

Ambaari Dream Class (Kannada: pavilion mounted on the back of an elephant specially used in Mysore Dasara) is a series of Volvo B11R AC-Sleeper bus service operated by Karnataka State Road Transport Corporation

== History ==
It was launched on 15 April 2019,from Bengaluru to Vijaywada,Hyderabad etc

== Description ==
It is a Luxury AC-Sleeper service(Built by prakash and mg builders on volvo chassis) which is operated by KSRTC.It has 2+1 lower and upper berth sleeper seats 2+1. It consists multi-axle volvo bus.Its successor is Ambaari Class(Bi-axle Ac sleeper bus in Corona chassis) and predecessor to Ambaari Utsav Class(Built on volvo 9600) . It is replacing Sleeper service like Ambaari Class.Following success of this bus service around Tenders were called to convert 100 Airavat Club Class buses to Ambaari Dream Class in 2022.

== See also ==
- Ambaari Class
- Ambaari Utsav Class
