= Ambaari Class =

Public bus service in India

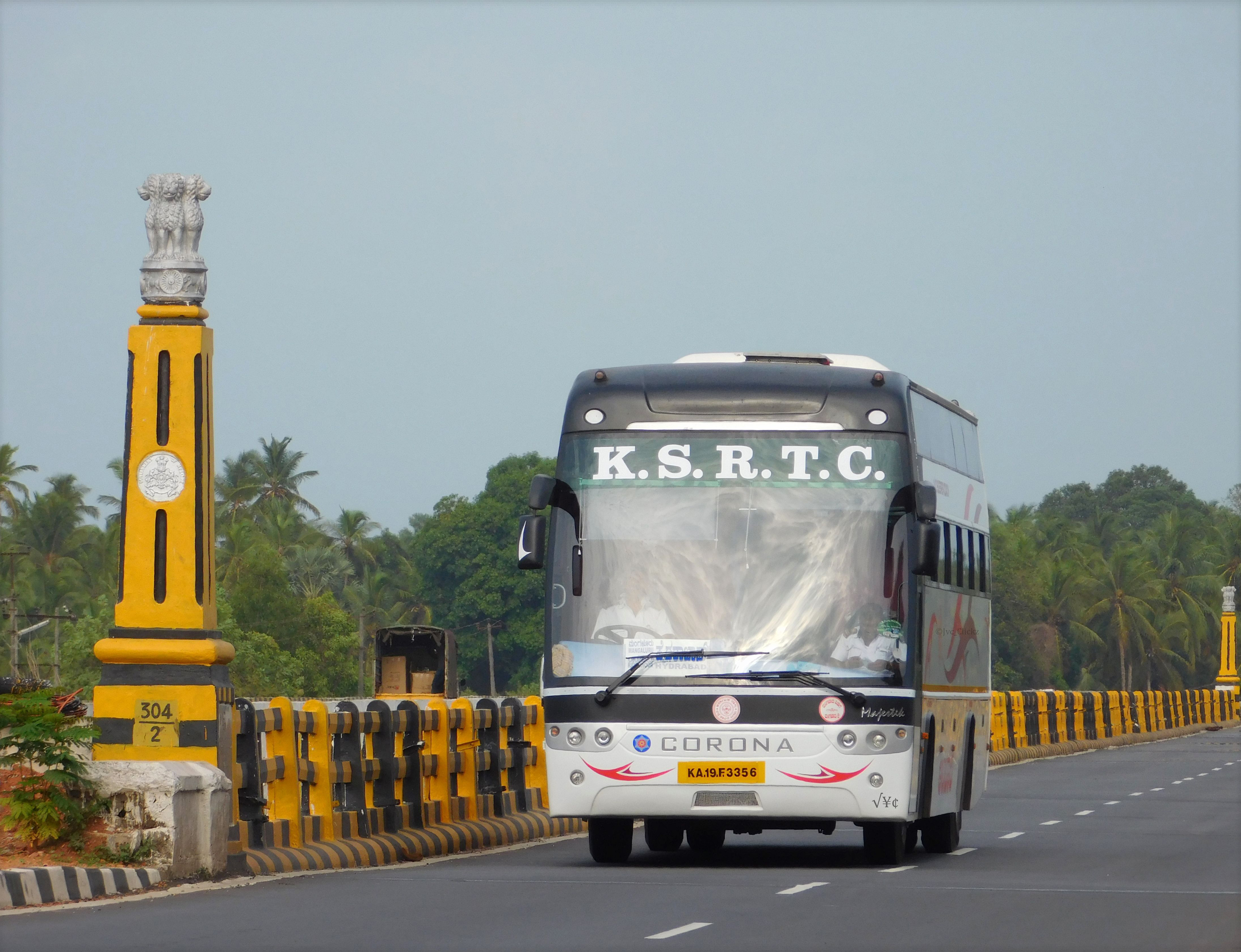
- KSRTC Corona AC Sleeper at Mabukala Bridge on Route: Mangalore - Hyderabad.
- Parent: Karnataka State Road Transport Corporation,North Western Karnataka Road Transport Corporation,Kalyana Karnataka Road Transport Corporation
- Founded: 10 January 2015
- Locale: Karnataka
- Service area: Karnataka
- Service type: AC Sleeper Inter-city, Inter-State with Corona bus chassis
- Fleet: 20
- Operator: KSRTC,NWKRTC,KKRTC (all under Government of Karnataka)
- Website: ksrtc.karnataka.gov.in/en
- successor: Ambaari Dream Class

Ambaari Class(in Kannada it means pavilion mounted on the back of an elephant specially used in Mysore Dasara) is a series of AC-Sleeper bus service operated by Karnataka RTC's (except for Bangalore Metropolitan Transport Corporation) across cities and districts of Karnataka. It consists buses of Corona Chassis.

== History ==
It was launched on 10 January 2010 by then district incharge minister of Gadag District H. K. Patil by launching bus services from Gadag to Bengaluru.

== Description ==
It is an AC-Sleeper service which is operated by KSRTC, NWKRTC and KKRTC. It has 2+1 sleeping layout on both upper and lower berths. It consists bi-axle corona bus unlike its successor like Ambaari Utsav Class and Dream Class as it consist of multi-axle Volvo buses. It is being slowly replaced by Sleeper services like Ambaari Utsav Class(in KSRTC and NWKRTC) and Ambaari Dream Class(in KSRTC), Kalyana Ratha(Operated by KKRTC),AC-Sleeper bus(Tata chasis operated by KSRTC) and Raja Ratha(Operated by NWKRTC)

== Gallery ==
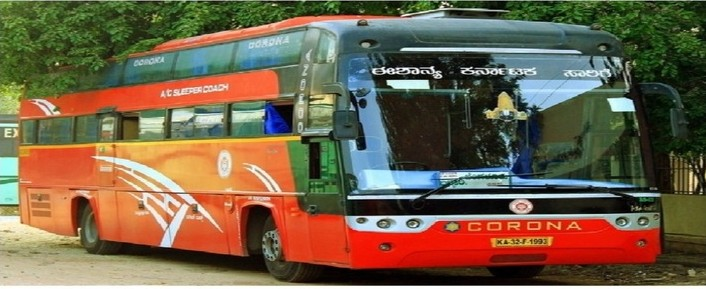
KKRTC'S Ambaari Class

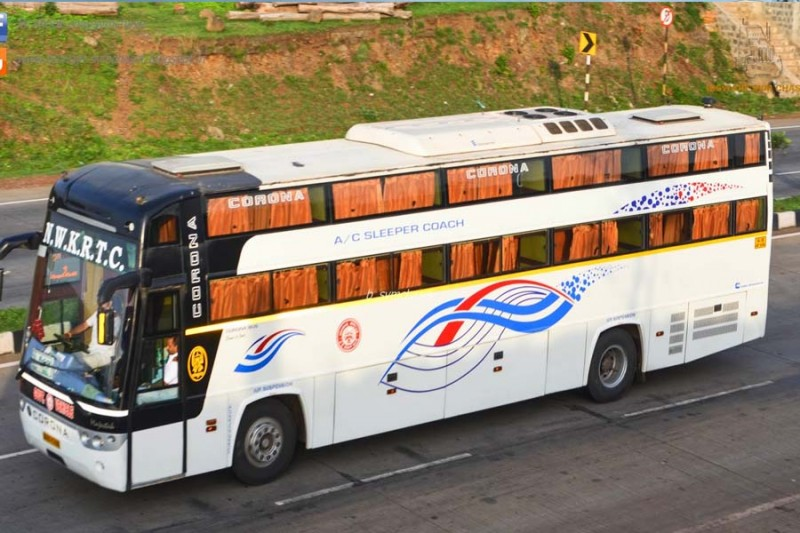
NWKRTC'S Ambaari Class

== See also ==
- Rajahamsa Executive Class
- Karnataka Sarige
