= Seetharamapalya metro station =

Namma Metro's Purple Line metro station

Seetharamapalya
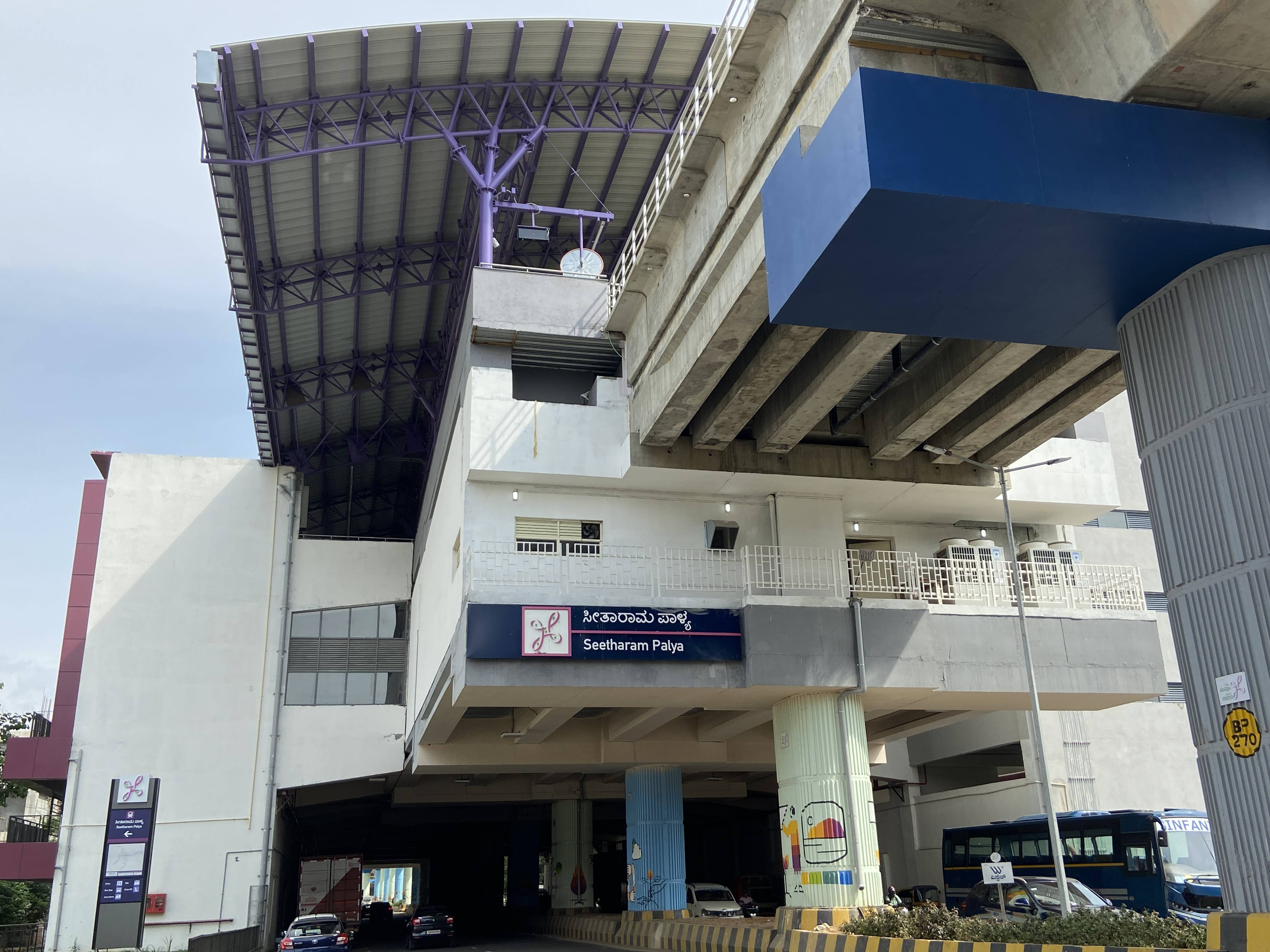
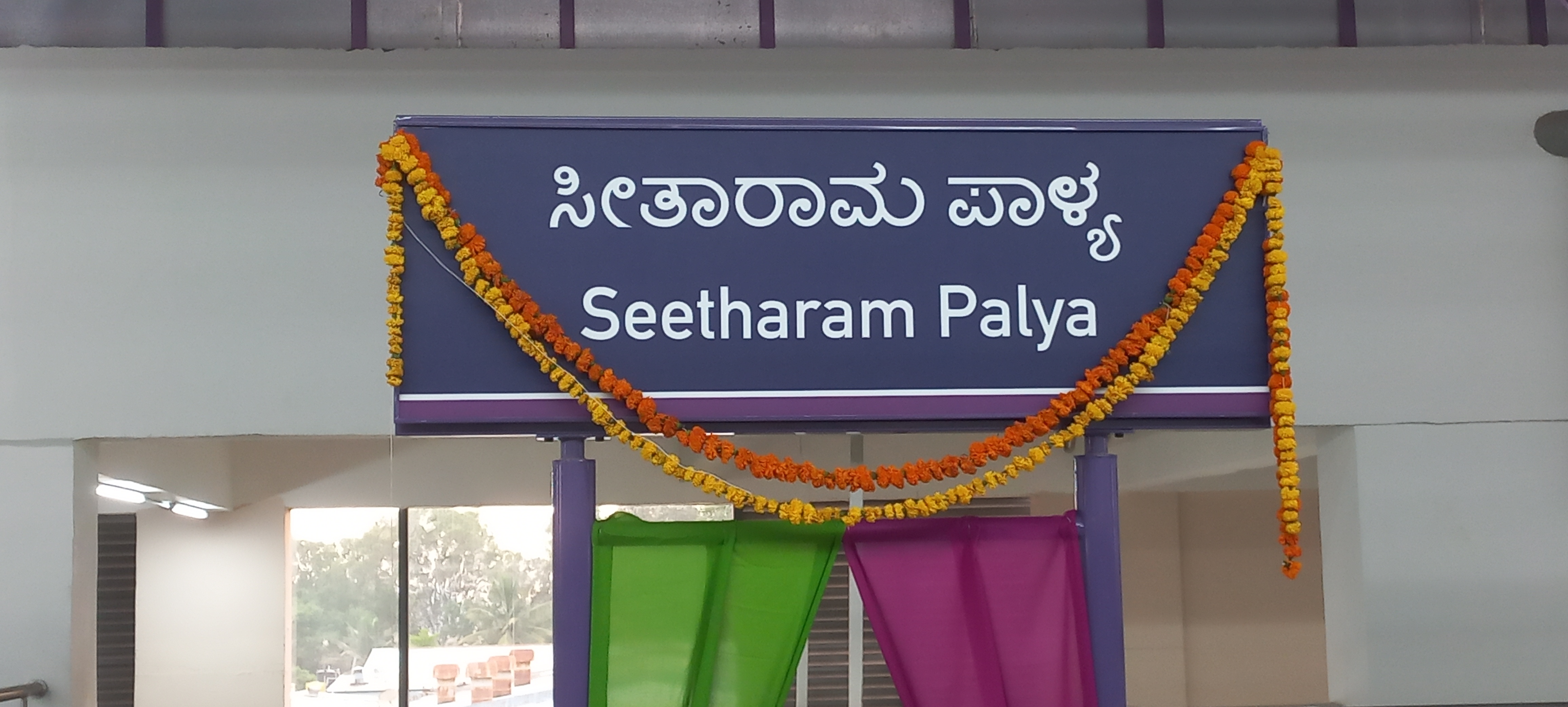
- Seetharamapalya metro station

General information
- Location: Whitefield Road, V. S. T. Mahadevapura Post, Hoodi, Bengaluru, Karnataka 560048
- Coordinates: 12.98092°N 77.70887°E
- System: Namma Metro station
- Owner: Bangalore Metro Rail Corporation Ltd (BMRCL)
- Operator: Namma Metro
- Line: Purple Line
- Platforms: Side platform Platform-1 → Whitefield (Kadugodi); Platform-2 → Challaghatta
- Tracks: 2

Construction
- Structure type: Elevated, Double track
- Platform levels: 2
- Parking: Two Wheelers
- Accessible: Yes
- Architect: ITD - ITD Cementation India JV

Other information
- Status: Staffed
- Station code: VWIA

History
- Opened: 26 March 2023; 3 years ago
- Electrified: 750 V DC third rail

Services
Preceding station	Namma Metro	Following station
Kundalahalli towards Whitefield (Kadugodi)	Purple Line	Hoodi towards Challaghatta
Route map
Location

Seetharamapalya is an elevated metro station on the East-West corridor of the Purple Line of Namma Metro in Bengaluru, India. This station is located near IFB Automotive Pvt. Ltd., Fairfield by Marriott Hotel, IFB Industries and many more.

The Whitefield - Krishnarajapura trial runs were successfully conducted from 25 October 2022 for a month. This metro station was inaugurated on March 25, 2023 by Prime Minister Narendra Modi and was opened to the public on March 26, 2023.

== Station layout ==
G	Street level	Exit/Entrance
L1	Mezzanine	Fare control, station agent, Metro Card vending machines, crossover
L2	Side Platform | Doors will open on the left
L2	Platform 1 Eastbound	Towards → Whitefield (Kadugodi); Next Station: Kundalahalli
L2	Platform 2 Westbound	Towards ← Challaghatta; Next Station: Hoodi
L2	Side Platform | Doors will open on the left
L2

== Entry/Exit ==
There are 2 Entry/Exit points - A and B. Commuters can use either of the points for their travel.

- Entry/Exit point A - Towards Brigade Lakefront side
- Entry/Exit point B - Towards IFB Industries side

== See also ==
- Bangalore
- List of Namma Metro stations
- Transport in Karnataka
- List of metro systems
- List of rapid transit systems in India
- Bangalore Metropolitan Transport Corporation
