= Jnanabharathi metro station =

Namma Metro's Purple Line metro station

Jnanabharathi
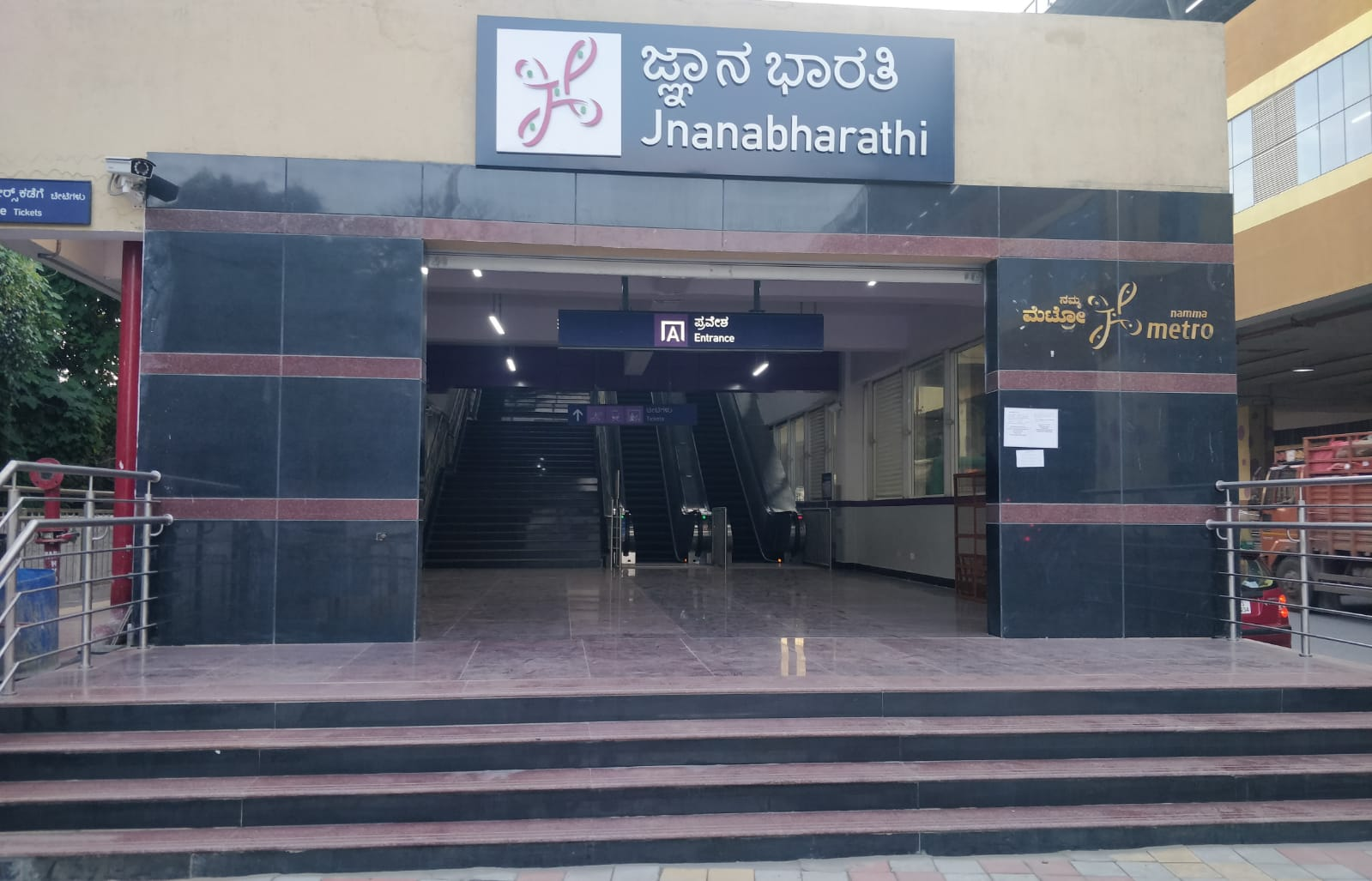
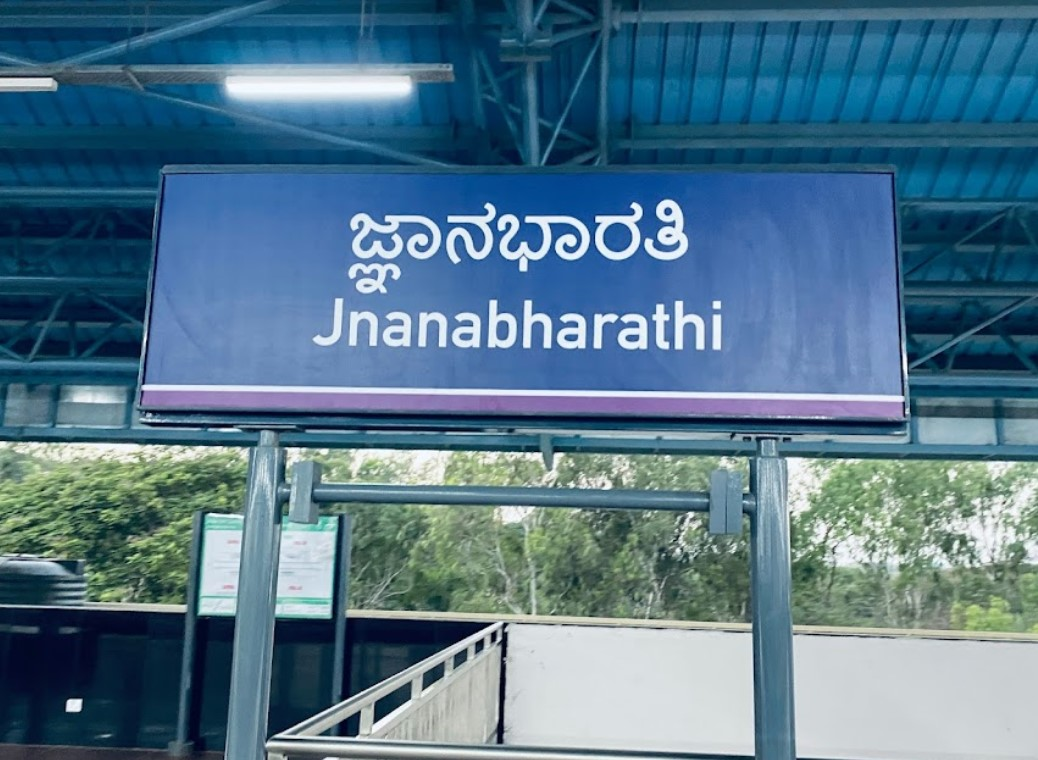

General information
- Other names: Bangalore University, Dhanvantari Vana Park
- Location: Bengaluru University Gate, Kenchenhalli, RR Nagar, Bengaluru, Karnataka 560056
- Coordinates: 12.935555922256171°N 77.51201871082992°E
- System: Namma Metro station
- Owner: Bangalore Metro Rail Corporation Ltd (BMRCL)
- Operator: Namma Metro
- Line: Purple Line
- Platforms: Side platform Platform-1 → Whitefield (Kadugodi); Platform-2 → Challaghatta
- Tracks: 2
- Connections: Jnanabharati Halt

Construction
- Structure type: Elevated, Double track
- Platform levels: 2
- Parking: Available
- Architect: IL&FS

Other information
- Status: Staffed
- Station code: BGUC

History
- Opened: 30 August 2021; 5 years ago
- Electrified: 750 V DC third rail

Services
Preceding station	Namma Metro	Following station
Rajarajeshwari Nagar towards Whitefield (Kadugodi)	Purple Line	Pattanagere towards Challaghatta
Route map
Location

Jnanabharathi is an elevated metro station on the East-West corridor of the Purple Line of Namma Metro serving the Bangalore University campus along with Dhanvantri Vana park in Bengaluru, India. The Station was inaugurated on 29 August 2021 and was opened to the public on 30 August 2021.

== Station layout ==
G	Street level	Exit/Entrance
L1	Mezzanine	Fare control, station agent, Metro Card vending machines, crossover
L2	Side platform | Doors will open on the left
L2	Platform 1 Eastbound	Towards → Whitefield (Kadugodi); Next Station: Rajarajeshwari Nagar
L2	Platform 2 Westbound	Towards ← Challaghatta; Next Station: Pattanagere
L2	Side platform | Doors will open on the left
L2

== Entry/Exits ==
There are 3 Entry/Exit points – A, B and C. Commuters can use either of the points for their travel.

- Entry/Exit point A: Towards Sri Shwetambhar Terapanth Jain Bhavan side
- Entry/Exit point B: Towards Bangalore University South Gate side
- Entry/Exit point C: Towards Pattanagere side

== See also ==
- Bangalore
- List of Namma Metro stations
- Transport in Karnataka
- List of metro systems
- List of rapid transit systems in India
