= Kengeri Bus Terminal metro station =

Namma Metro's Purple Line metro station

Kengeri Bus Terminal
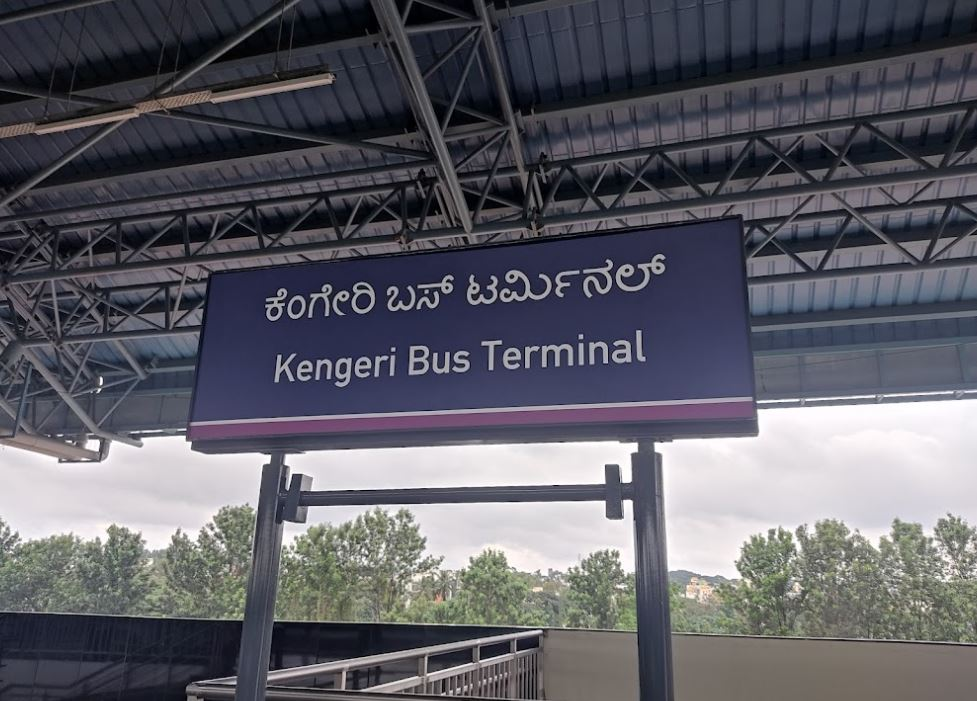
- A metro station connecting the Kengeri Bus Terminal

General information
- Other names: Kengeri Bus Station, Kengeri TTMC
- Location: Kengeri bus terminal Metro Station Mailasandra, Mailasandra, Bengaluru, Karnataka 560060
- Coordinates: 12.914897547311018°N 77.48759284335294°E
- System: Namma Metro station
- Owner: Bangalore Metro Rail Corporation Ltd (BMRCL)
- Operator: Namma Metro
- Line: Purple Line
- Platforms: Side platform Platform-1 → Whitefield (Kadugodi); Platform-2 → Challaghatta
- Tracks: 2
- Connections: Kengeri TTMC

Construction
- Structure type: Elevated, Double track
- Platform levels: 2
- Parking: Available
- Architect: Soma Enterprise Ltd.

Other information
- Status: Staffed
- Station code: MLSD

History
- Opened: 30 August 2021; 5 years ago
- Electrified: 750 V DC third rail

Services
Preceding station	Namma Metro	Following station
Pattanagere towards Whitefield (Kadugodi)	Purple Line	Kengeri towards Challaghatta
Route map
Location

Kengeri Bus Terminal is an elevated metro station on the East-West corridor of the Purple Line of Namma Metro in Bengaluru, India. It is one of the most important metro stations since it holds the Kengeri Bus Terminus in the suburban city of Kengeri. It was inaugurated on 29 August 2021 and opened to the public on 30 August 2021.

== Station layout ==
G	Street level	Exit/Entrance
L1	Mezzanine	Fare control, station agent, Metro Card vending machines, crossover
L2	Side platform | Doors will open on the left
L2	Platform 1 Eastbound	Towards → Whitefield (Kadugodi); Next Station: Pattanagere
L2	Platform 2 Westbound	Towards ← Challaghatta; Next Station: Kengeri
L2	Side platform | Doors will open on the left
L2

== Entry/Exit ==
There are 2 Entry/Exit points - A and B. Commuters can use either of the points for their travel. Passengers wishing to use the bus services from the nearby bus terminal are advised to exit from the eastern side of the metro station.

- Entry/Exit point A - Towards Kengeri side
- Entry/Exit point B - Towards Kengeri side

== See also ==
- Bangalore
- List of Namma Metro stations
- Transport in Karnataka
- List of metro systems
- List of rapid transit systems in India
