= Deepanjali Nagar metro station =

Namma Metro's Purple Line metro station

Deepanjali Nagar
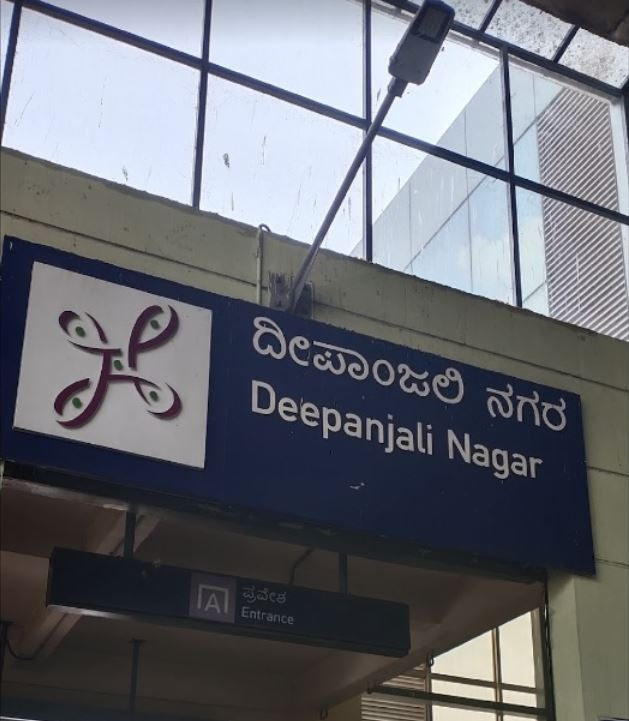

General information
- Other names: Deepanjali Nagara
- Location: Kavika Lay Out, Bapuji Nagar, Bengaluru, Karnataka 560026
- Coordinates: 12.952187°N 77.536939°E
- System: Namma Metro station
- Owner: Bangalore Metro Rail Corporation Ltd (BMRCL)
- Operator: Namma Metro
- Line: Purple Line
- Platforms: Side platform Platform-1 → Whitefield (Kadugodi); Platform-2 → Challaghatta
- Tracks: 2

Construction
- Structure type: Elevated, Double track
- Platform levels: 2
- Accessible: Yes
- Architect: Punj Lloyd - Sembawang Infrastructure (India) JV

Other information
- Status: Staffed
- Station code: DJNR

History
- Opened: 16 November 2015; 10 years ago
- Electrified: 750 V DC third rail

Services
Preceding station	Namma Metro	Following station
Attiguppe towards Whitefield (Kadugodi)	Purple Line	Mysore Road towards Challaghatta
Route map
Location

Deepanjali Nagar is an elevated metro station on the East-West corridor of the Purple Line of Namma Metro serving Deepanjali Nagar in Bengaluru, India. It was opened to the public on 16 November 2015.

== Station layout ==
G	Street level	Exit/Entrance
L1	Mezzanine	Fare control, station agent, Metro Card vending machines, crossover
L2	Side platform | Doors will open on the left
L2	Platform 1 Eastbound	Towards → Whitefield (Kadugodi); Next Station: Attiguppe
L2	Platform 2 Westbound	Towards ← Challaghatta; Next Station: Mysuru Road; Change at the next station for Orange Line **
L2	Side platform | Doors will open on the left
L2

== Entry/Exits ==
There are 3 Entry/Exit points – A, B and C. Commuters can use either of the points for their travel.

- Entry/Exit point A: Towards Mysore Road or towards Kengeri side
- Entry/Exit point B: Towards Attiguppe side with wheelchair accessibility
- Entry/Exit point C: Towards Attiguppe side

== See also ==
- Bangalore
- List of Namma Metro stations
- Transport in Karnataka
- List of metro systems
- List of rapid transit systems in India
- Krishnadevaraya halt railway station
