= Pattanagere metro station =

Namma Metro's Purple Line metro station

Pattanagere
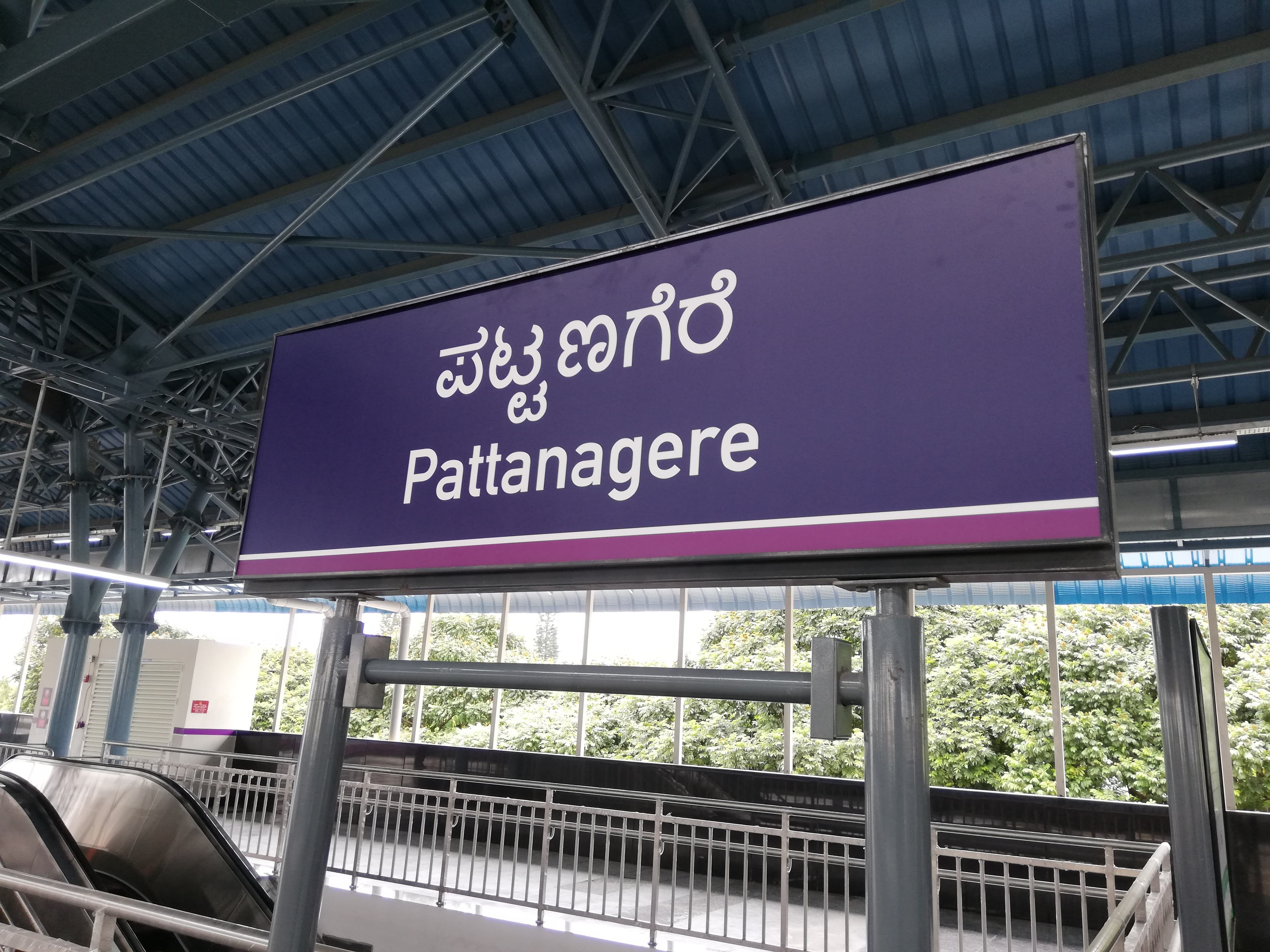

General information
- Other names: R.V. College of Engineering, RV University, Harsha Layout
- Location: Mysore Rd, Harsha Layout, Kengeri Satellite Town, Bengaluru, Karnataka 560059
- Coordinates: 12.92441467654839°N 77.49825635000634°E
- System: Namma Metro station
- Owner: Bangalore Metro Rail Corporation Ltd (BMRCL)
- Operator: Namma Metro
- Line: Purple Line
- Platforms: Side platform Platform-1 → Whitefield (Kadugodi); Platform-2 → Challaghatta
- Tracks: 2

Construction
- Structure type: Elevated, Double track
- Platform levels: 2
- Architect: IL&FS

Other information
- Status: Staffed
- Station code: PATG

History
- Opened: 30 August 2021; 5 years ago
- Electrified: 750 V DC third rail

Services
Preceding station	Namma Metro	Following station
Jnanabharathi towards Whitefield (Kadugodi)	Purple Line	Kengeri Bus Terminal towards Challaghatta
Route map
Location

Pattanagere is an elevated metro station on the East-West corridor of the Purple Line of Namma Metro serving the RV College of Engineering, RV University in Bengaluru, India. To the North lies the Jnanabharathi area and to the South is the suburbs of Kengeri. It was inaugurated on 29 August 2021 and opened to the public on 30 August 2021.

== Station layout ==
G	Street level	Exit/Entrance
L1	Mezzanine	Fare control, station agent, Metro Card vending machines, crossover
L2	Side platform | Doors will open on the left
L2	Platform 1 Eastbound	Towards → Whitefield (Kadugodi); Next Station: Jnanabharathi
L2	Platform 2 Westbound	Towards ← Challaghatta; Next Station: Kengeri Bus Terminal
L2	Side platform | Doors will open on the left
L2

== Entry/Exits ==
There are 2 Entry/Exit points – A and B. Commuters can use either of the points for their travel.

- Entry/Exit point A: Towards RV College of Engineering/RV University side
- Entry/Exit point B: Towards Duvasapalya Road side

== See also ==
- Bangalore
- List of Namma Metro stations
- Transport in Karnataka
- List of metro systems
- List of rapid transit systems in India
