= Kundalahalli metro station =

Namma Metro's Purple Line metro station

Kundalahalli
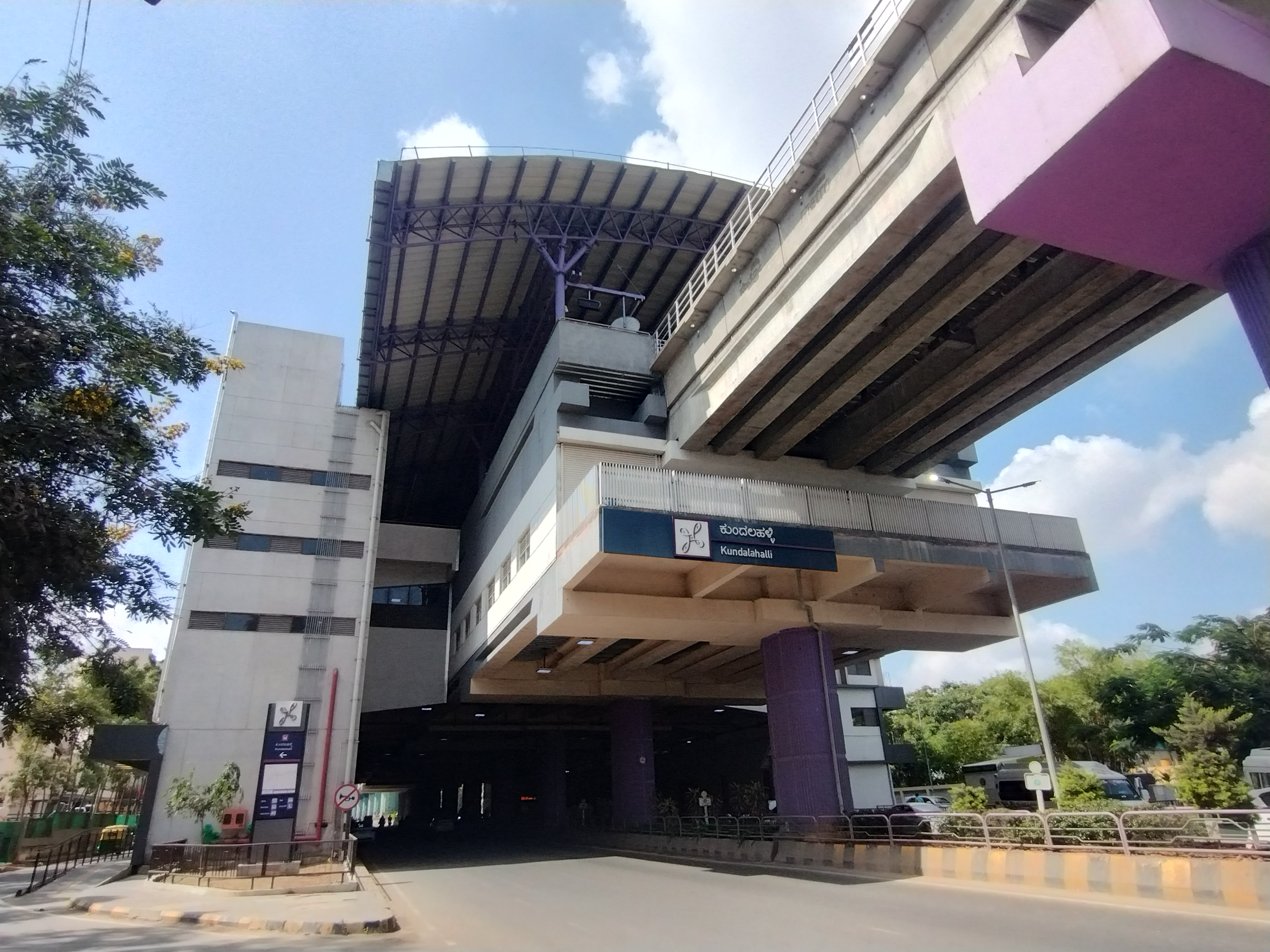
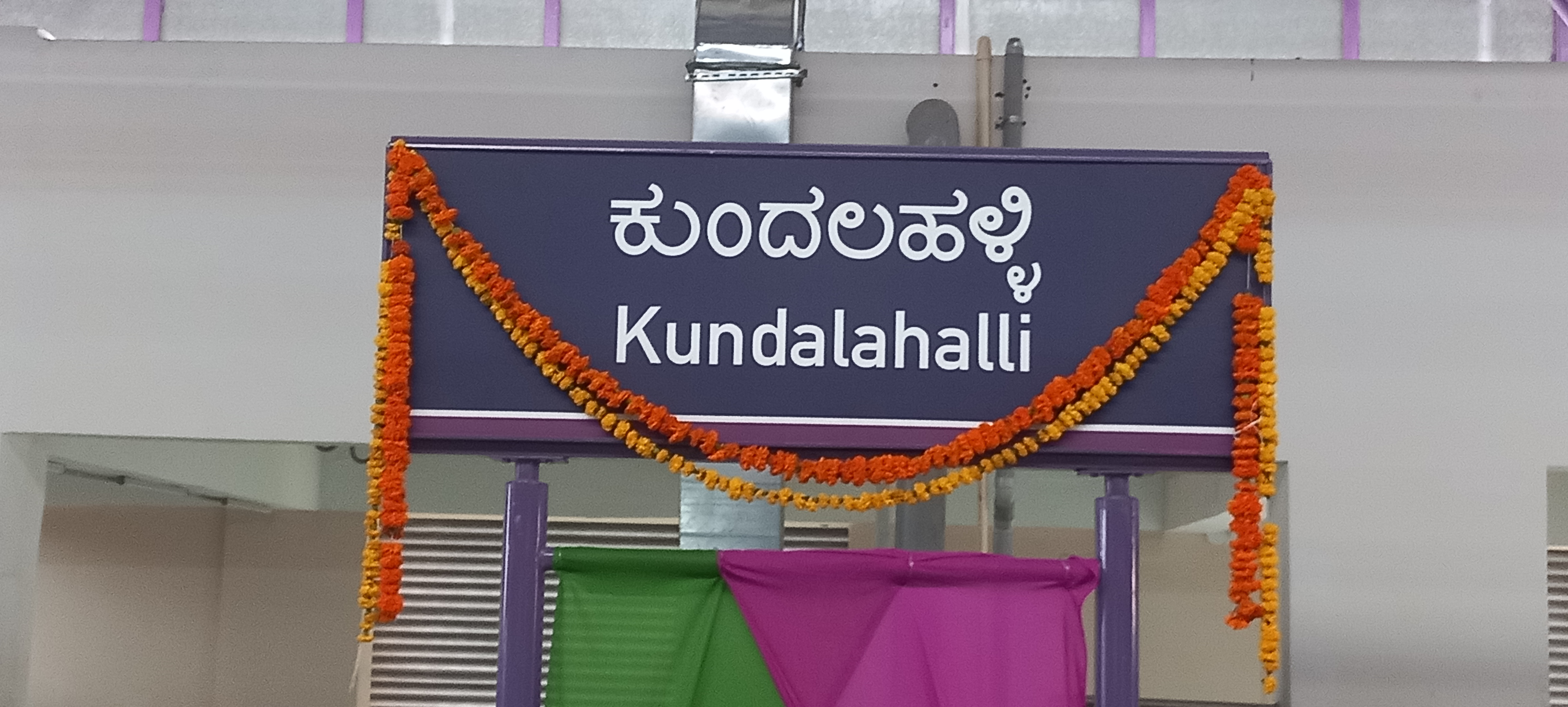
- Kundalahalli metro station

General information
- Location: EPIP Zone, Brookefield Bengaluru, Karnataka 560066
- Coordinates: 12.977461°N 77.715761°E
- System: Namma Metro station
- Owner: Bangalore Metro Rail Corporation Ltd (BMRCL)
- Operator: Namma Metro
- Line: Purple Line
- Platforms: Side platform Platform-1 → Whitefield (Kadugodi); Platform-2 → Challaghatta
- Tracks: 2

Construction
- Structure type: Elevated, Double track
- Platform levels: 2
- Parking: Two Wheelers
- Accessible: Yes
- Architect: ITD - ITD Cementation India JV

Other information
- Status: Staffed
- Station code: KDNH

History
- Opened: 26 March 2023; 3 years ago
- Electrified: 750 V DC third rail

Services
Preceding station	Namma Metro	Following station
Nallurhalli towards Whitefield (Kadugodi)	Purple Line	Seetharamapalya towards Challaghatta
Route map
Location

Kundalahalli is an elevated metro station on the east–west corridor of the Purple Line of Namma Metro in Bengaluru, India. SAP Labs India and some other locations like Fortune Select Trinity Hotel, Ginger Bangalore and many more, are in close proximityto this station.

The Whitefield - Krishnarajapura trial runs were successfully conducted from 25 October for a month. This metro station was inaugurated on March 25, 2023, by Prime Minister Narendra Modi and was opened to the public on March 26, 2023.

== Station layout ==
G	Street level	Exit/Entrance
L1	Mezzanine	Fare control, station agent, Metro Card vending machines, crossover
L2	Side Platform | Doors will open on the left
L2	Platform 1 Eastbound	Towards → Whitefield (Kadugodi); Next Station: Nallur Halli
L2	Platform 2 Westbound	Towards ← Challaghatta; Next Station: Seetharamapalya
L2	Side Platform | Doors will open on the left
L2

== Entry/Exit ==
There are 2 Entry/Exit points - A and B. Commuters can use either of the points for their travel.

- Entry/Exit point A - Towards SAP Labs India side
- Entry/Exit point B - Towards Trinity Club Lounge side

== See also ==
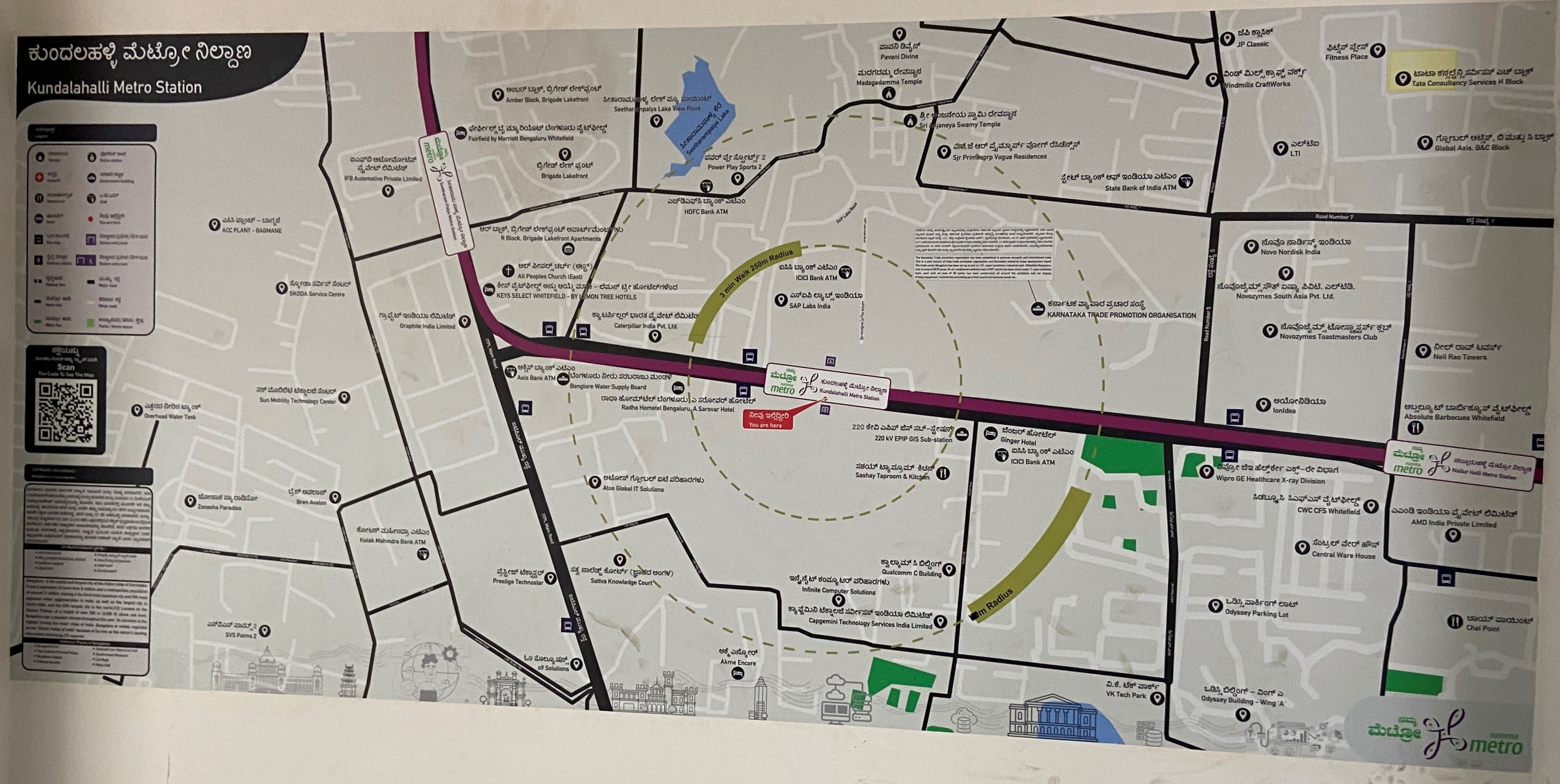
A map shown at the station

- Bangalore
- List of Namma Metro stations
- Transport in Karnataka
- List of metro systems
- List of rapid transit systems in India
- Bangalore Metropolitan Transport Corporation
