= Attiguppe metro station =

Namma Metro's Purple Line metro station

Attiguppe
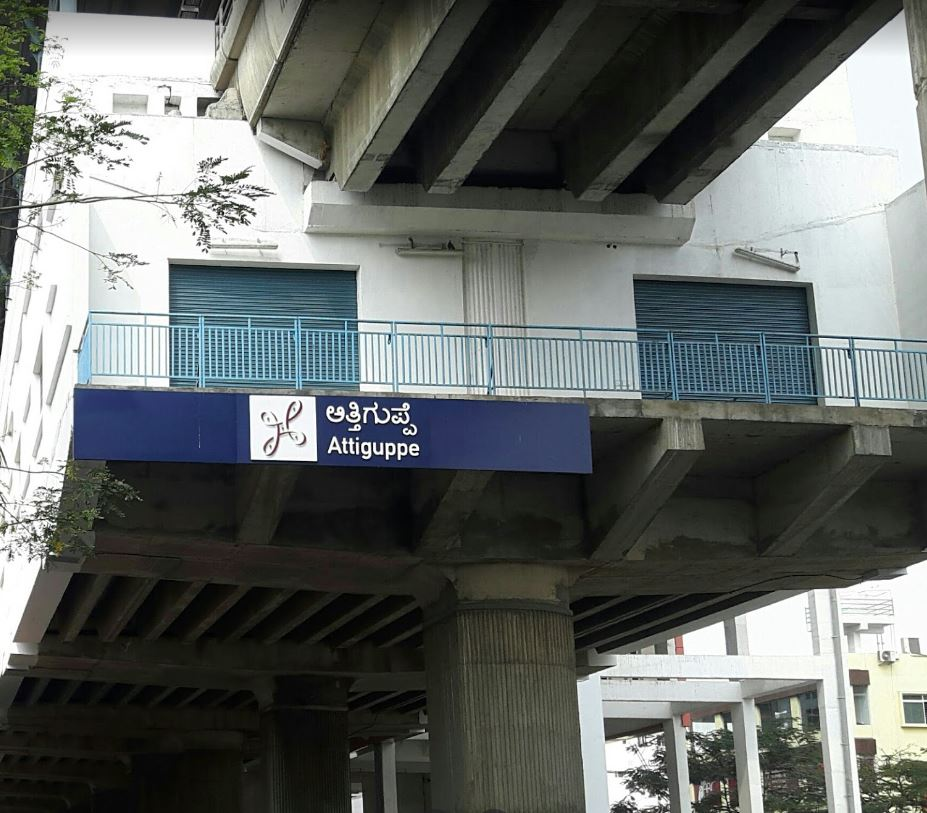

General information
- Location: Chord Rd, Govindaraja Nagar Ward, Attiguppe, Bengaluru, Karnataka 560040
- Coordinates: 12.961957°N 77.533582°E
- System: Namma Metro station
- Owner: Bangalore Metro Rail Corporation Ltd (BMRCL)
- Operator: Namma Metro
- Line: Purple Line
- Platforms: Side platform Platform-1 → Whitefield (Kadugodi); Platform-2 → Challaghatta
- Tracks: 2
- Connections: Vijayanagara TTMC

Construction
- Structure type: Elevated, Double track
- Platform levels: 2
- Accessible: Yes
- Architect: Ahluwalia Contracts (India)

Other information
- Status: Staffed
- Station code: AGPP

History
- Opened: 16 November 2015; 10 years ago
- Electrified: 750 V DC third rail

Services
Preceding station	Namma Metro	Following station
Vijayanagar towards Whitefield (Kadugodi)	Purple Line	Deepanjali Nagar towards Challaghatta
Route map
Location

Attiguppe is an elevated metro station on the East-West corridor of the Purple Line of Namma Metro serving Attiguppe in Bengaluru, India. It was opened to the public on 16 November 2015.

== Station layout ==
G	Street level	Exit/Entrance
L1	Mezzanine	Fare control, station agent, Metro Card vending machines, crossover
L2	Side platform | Doors will open on the left
L2	Platform 1 Eastbound	Towards → Whitefield (Kadugodi); Next Station: Vijayanagar
L2	Platform 2 Westbound	Towards ← Challaghatta; Next Station: Deepanjali Nagar
L2	Side platform | Doors will open on the left
L2

== Entry/Exits ==
There are 3 Entry/Exit points – A, B and C. Commuters can use either of the points for their travel.

== See also ==
- Bangalore
- List of Namma Metro stations
- Transport in Karnataka
- List of metro systems
- List of rapid transit systems in India
