= Vijayanagar metro station =

Namma Metro's Purple Line metro station

Vijayanagar
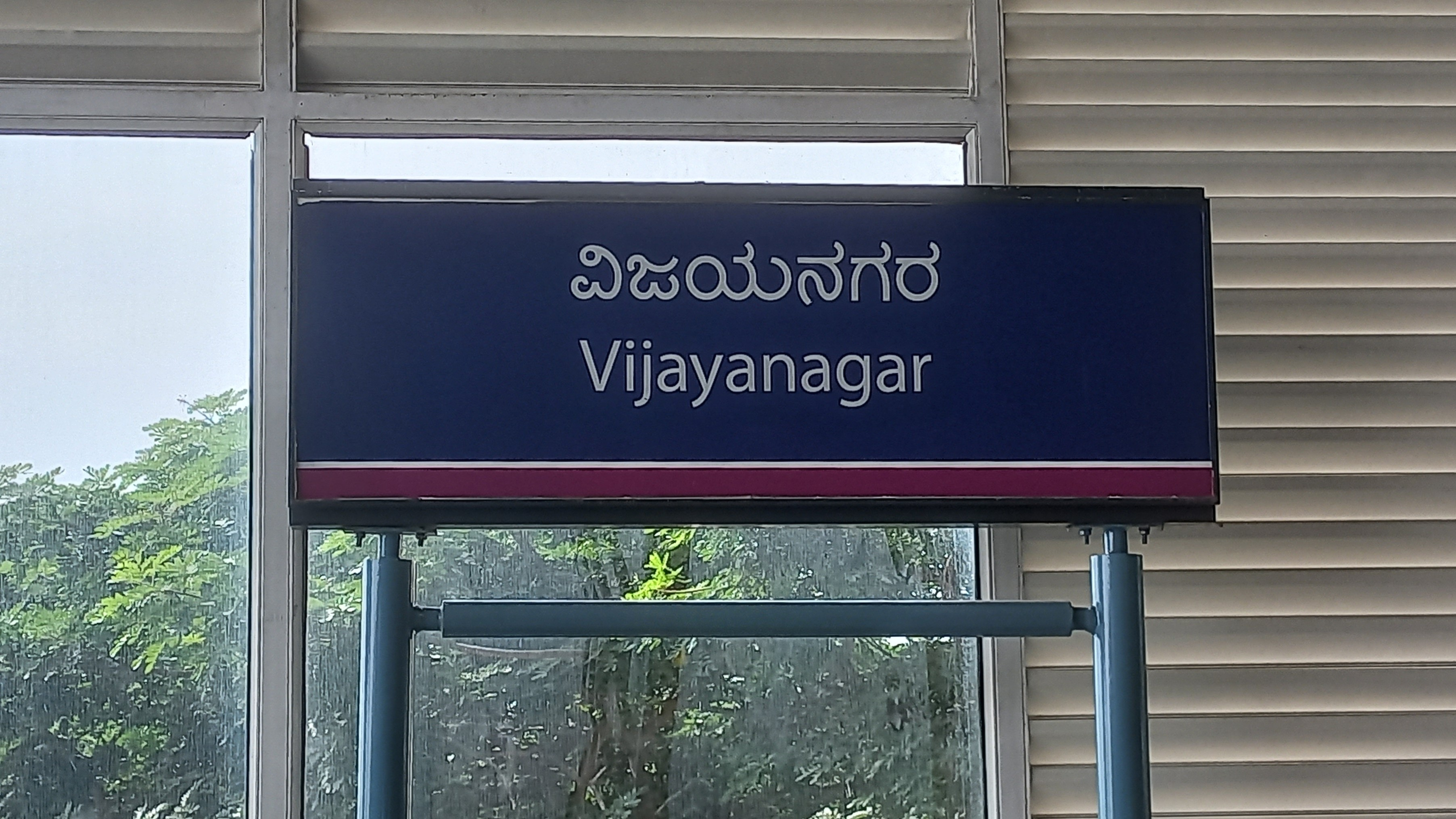

General information
- Location: Chord Rd, Hosahalli Extension, Vijaya Nagar, Bengaluru, Karnataka 560040
- Coordinates: 12.970801°N 77.537285°E
- System: Namma Metro station
- Owner: Bangalore Metro Rail Corporation Ltd (BMRCL)
- Operator: Namma Metro
- Line: Purple Line
- Platforms: Side platform Platform-1 → Whitefield (Kadugodi); Platform-2 → Challaghatta
- Tracks: 2

Construction
- Structure type: Elevated, Double track
- Platform levels: 2
- Accessible: Yes
- Architect: Ahluwalia Contracts (India)

Other information
- Status: Staffed
- Station code: VJN

History
- Opened: 16 November 2015; 10 years ago
- Electrified: 750 V DC third rail

Services
Preceding station	Namma Metro	Following station
Hosahalli towards Whitefield (Kadugodi)	Purple Line	Attiguppe towards Challaghatta
Route map
Location

Vijayanagar is an elevated metro station on the East-West corridor of the Purple Line of Namma Metro serving Vijaynagar in Bengaluru, India. It was opened to the public on 16 November 2015.

== Station layout ==
G	Street level	Exit/Entrance
L1	Mezzanine	Fare control, station agent, Metro Card vending machines, crossover
L2	Side platform | Doors will open on the left
L2	Platform 1 Eastbound	Towards → Whitefield (Kadugodi); Next Station: Sri Balagangadharanatha Swamiji Stn., Hosahalli; Change at the next station for Grey Line
L2	Platform 2 Westbound	Towards ← Challaghatta; Next Station: Attiguppe
L2	Side platform | Doors will open on the left
L2

== Entry/Exits ==
There are 3 Entry/Exit points – A, B and C. Commuters can use either of the points for their travel.

- Entry/Exit point A: Towards Post Office side
- Entry/Exit point B: Towards Hosahalli side
- Entry/Exit point C: Towards Adishwar Electro World side

== See also ==
- Bangalore
- List of Namma Metro stations
- Transport in Karnataka
- List of metro systems
- List of rapid transit systems in India
