= Kengeri metro station =

Namma Metro's Purple Line metro station

Kengeri
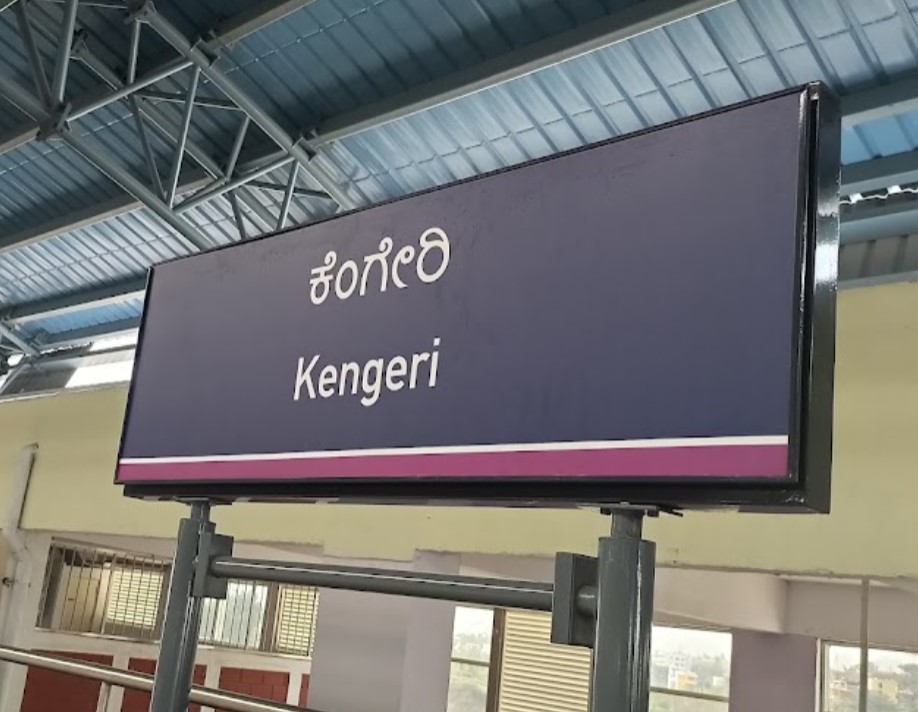
- This metro station serving the suburbs of Kengeri.

General information
- Location: 133/2B, BSM Extension, Kengeri Satellite Town, Bengaluru, Karnataka 560060
- Coordinates: 12.9080°N 77.4765°E
- System: Namma Metro station
- Owner: Bangalore Metro Rail Corporation Ltd (BMRCL)
- Operator: Namma Metro
- Line: Purple Line
- Platforms: Side platform Platform-1 → Whitefield (Kadugodi); Platform-2 → Challaghatta
- Tracks: 2
- Connections: Kengeri

Construction
- Structure type: Elevated, Double track
- Platform levels: 2
- Parking: Available
- Architect: Soma Enterprise Ltd.

Other information
- Status: Staffed
- Station code: KGIT

History
- Opened: 30 August 2021; 5 years ago
- Electrified: 750 V DC third rail

Services
Preceding station	Namma Metro	Following station
Kengeri Bus Terminal towards Whitefield (Kadugodi)	Purple Line	Challaghatta Terminus
Route map
Location

Kengeri is an elevated metro station on the East-West corridor of the Purple Line of Namma Metro serving the suburbs of Kengeri in Bengaluru, India. It was inaugurated on 29 August 2021 and opened to the public on 30 August 2021.

The station was the terminus on the western end of the Purple Line for two years and two months, until the Challaghatta metro station was opened to the public in October 2023. While Kengeri was initially planned to remain a terminus for the Purple Line, difficulty in procuring land around the station to construct a train depot led BMRCL to revise their plans and construct a new final station at Challaghatta.

== Station layout ==
L2	Side platform | Doors will open on the left
L2	Platform 1 Eastbound	Towards → Whitefield (Kadugodi); Next Station: Kengeri Bus Terminal
L2	Platform 2 Westbound	Towards ← Challaghatta
L2	Side platform | Doors will open on the left
L1	Mezzanine	Fare control, station agent, Metro Card vending machines, crossover
G	Street level	Exit/Entrance

== Entry/Exit ==
There are 2 Entry/Exit points - A and B. Commuters can use either of the points for their travel.

- Entry/Exit point A - Towards Challeghatta side
- Entry/Exit point B - Towards Kengeri Police Station side

== See also ==
- Bangalore
- List of Namma Metro stations
- Transport in Karnataka
- List of metro systems
- List of rapid transit systems in India
