= Purple Line (Namma Metro) =

Metro line in Bengaluru, India

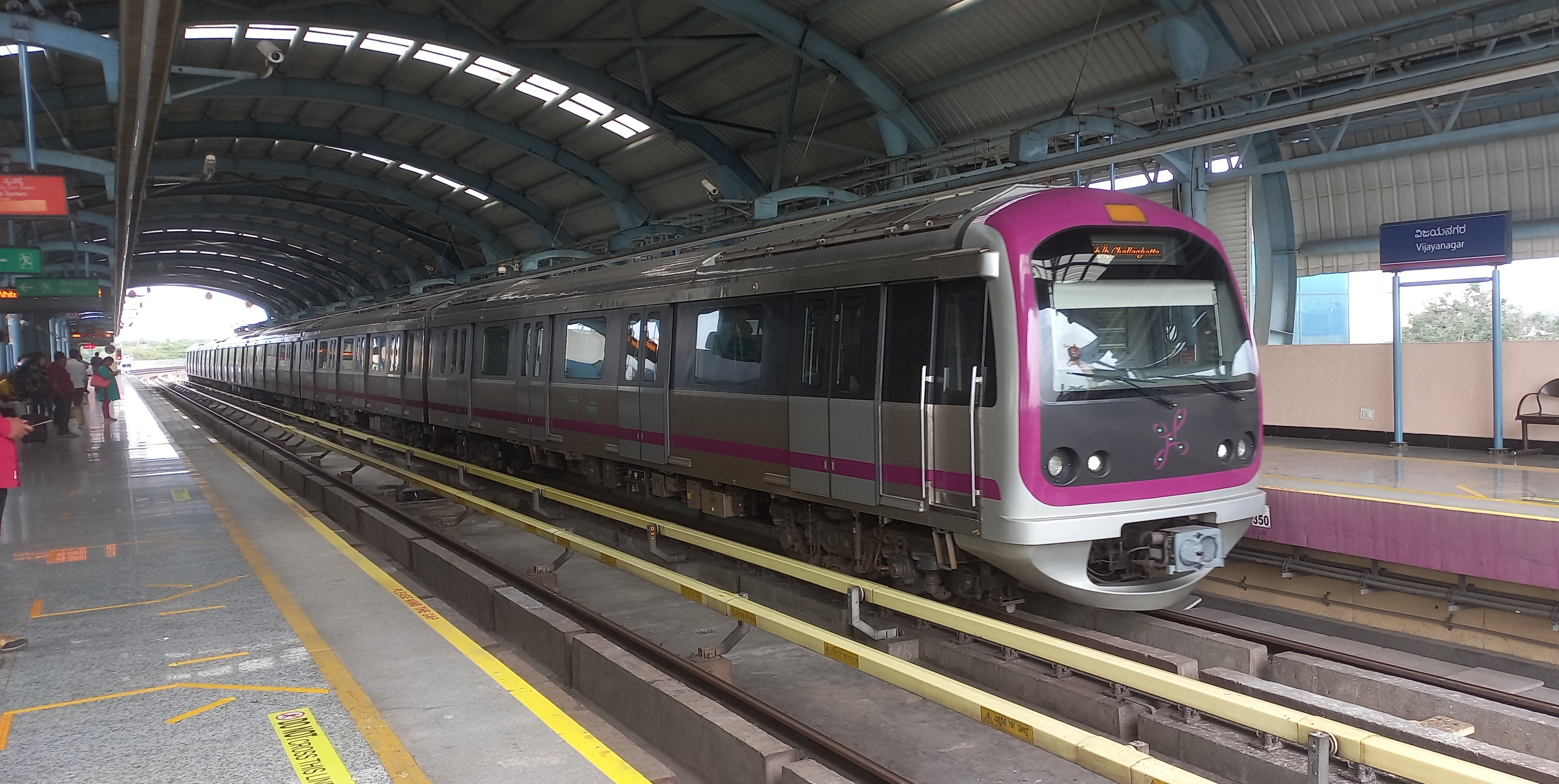
- This trainset on standby at Vijayanagar metro station and heading towards Challaghatta metro station

Overview
- Other names: East–West corridor; Line 1; Whitefield (Kadugodi)–Challaghatta Line
- Native name: ನೇರಳೆ ಮಾರ್ಗ (Neraḷe mārga)
- Owner: Bengaluru Metro Rail Corporation Limited (BMRCL)
- Locale: Bengaluru, Karnataka, India
- Termini: Whitefield (Kadugodi); Challaghatta
- Connecting lines: Operational (2): Green Line Pink Line; Upcoming (4): Blue Line Orange Line Grey Line Red Line; Planned (1): Inner Ring Line
- Stations: 37 (Operational)
- Website: bmrc.co.in

Service
- Type: Metro
- System: Namma Metro
- Depot(s): Kadugodi; Challaghatta (under construction)
- Rolling stock: BEML
- Daily ridership: 191,056 (2019)
- Ridership: 69.74 million (2019)

History
- Opened: 20 October 2011; 15 years ago
- Last extension: 9 October 2023; 3 years ago

Technical
- Line length: 43.49 km (27.02 mi)
- Character: Elevated, at grade and underground
- Track gauge: 1,435 mm (4 ft 8 1/2 in) standard gauge
- Electrification: 750 V DC third rail
- Operating speed: 36 km/h (22 mph)

The Purple Line is a line on the Namma Metro rail system. As of 2023, the line is 43.49 km (27.02 mi) long and spans 37 stations from Challaghatta in the southwest to Whitefield (Kadugodi) to the east. It is mostly elevated, with 31 elevated stations, 5 underground stations and 1 at-grade station. The line passes through many major activity centers and business districts of the city, including Whitefield, ITPL, Krishnarajapura, MG Road, Vidhana Soudha, Majestic, Vijayanagar, Rajarajeshwari Nagar and Kengeri. An interchange with the Green Line is located at Majestic station. Phase I of the Purple Line was the first underground metro section constructed in South India. The line is currently operated by 33 train sets with 6 coaches each. Titagarh will provide 15 train sets out of 21 train sets new order by March 2026.

== Construction ==
Sections of the Purple Line were opened as below:

History
Phase	Section	Opening date	Terminals		Length	Stations
1	Reach 1	20 October 2011	Baiyappanahalli	Mahatma Gandhi Road	6.70 km (4.16 mi)	6
1	Reach 2	16 November 2015	Magadi Road	Mysuru Road	6.40 km (3.98 mi)	6
1	UG 1	30 April 2016	Mahatma Gandhi Road	Magadi Road	5.12 km (3.18 mi) (Note: The stretch from M. G. Road to Magadi Road is 5.12 km (3.18 mi). UG 1 is the name given by the BMRCL to the underground portion of this stretch, which is composed of two 4.82 km (3.00 mi) tunnels.)	5
2	Reach 2A	30 August 2021	Mysuru Road	Kengeri	7.5 km (4.66 mi)	6
2	Reach 1A	26 March 2023	Krishnarajapura	Kundalahalli	6.5 km (4.0 mi)	6
2	Reach 1B	26 March 2023	Kundalahalli	Whitefield (Kadugodi)	7.21 km (4.48 mi)	6
2	Reach 1A	9 October 2023	Krishnarajapura	Baiyappanahalli	2.10 km (1.30 mi)	1
2	Reach 2B	9 October 2023	Kengeri	Challaghatta	2.05 km (1.27 mi)	1
Total			Whitefield (Kadugodi)	Challaghatta	43.49 km (27.02 mi)	37

=== Phase I ===
Civil construction work on Phase I of the line began on 15 April 2007 and was originally scheduled to be completed in 5 years. However, the project faced delays and missed several deadlines. Difficult tunnel boring conditions through a mixed geology with hard rock caused major delays. The first stretch of Purple Line (Reach 1, fully elevated) between Baiyyappanahalli and Mahatma Gandhi Road was inaugurated on 20 October 2011. Reach 2 (fully elevated) between Mysore Road and Magadi Road commenced operations on 16 November 2015. These two sections operated independently until the final section, the underground stretch between Mahatma Gandhi Road and City Railway station was opened on 30 April 2016, thus linking the previously opened stretches and completing Phase I.

Costs for the Purple Line were estimated at ₹4500–5000 crores. The cost of the underground stretch alone amounted to about ₹1,000 crore (US$110 million). Land acquisition for Phase I of the project cost ₹2,500 crore (US$270 million). BMRCL secured ₹6,500 crore (US$690 million) through long-term loans and ₹300 crore (US$32 million) by selling bonds, while the remaining project cost was funded by the central and state governments. Loans were secured from several agencies: ₹3,000 crore (US$320 million) from the Japan International Cooperation Agency (JICA), ₹600 crore (US$64 million) from the Housing and Urban Development Corporation Limited (HUDCO), ₹25 crore (US$2.7 million) from the Asian Development Bank (ADB), and the rest from a French lending agency. Approximately 10% of the ₹6500 crore was to be paid as interest by BMRCL each year. The Federation of Karnataka Chambers of Commerce and Industry (FKCCI) had estimated that interest payment alone would be ₹2 crore (US$210,000); however, BMRCL stated that it was not as high but "definitely more than ₹1 crore (US$110,000) per day".

The tunnels bored using tunnel boring machines (TBMs) are located approximately 60 feet below ground level, have an outer diameter of 6.5 metres and inner diameter of 5.6 metres, and situated are 5 metres apart. Two Japanese TBMs, Helen and Margarita, were used for tunneling work of the Purple Line. Tunneling work began in May 2011 and completed in May 2014. Underground stations (City railway station, Sir M Visvesvaraya, Vidhana Soudha and Cubbon Park) were built by the cut-and-cover method which required 10,000 controlled blasts using 50,000 kg (110,000 lb) of explosives of 125 gm gel nitrate capsules due to hard granite rock. Blasts were carried out daily from 6 am to 7 am from March 2011 to early 2013, as regulations restricted blasting work from being carried out at other times of the day. Preparation for a single blast took approximately 3.5 hours, with the actual duration of a blast being 5 seconds. Approximately, 20,250 truckloads of debris were excavated during construction. Kolar-based National Institute of Rock Mechanics served as the consultant for blasting work. There were no injuries during the entire blasting process. A total of 2500 trees were cut down during the construction of both lines of Phase I.

Reach 1 was originally scheduled to begin operations in March 2010. After missing several deadlines, it was finally opened to the public on 20 October 2011 at 4 pm IST by Union Urban Development Minister Kamal Nath. There was an overwhelming response to the metro at the commencement of operations; as per BMRCL sources, within the first three days of operations, 169,019 people used the mass transit system. At the end of the 4th day, about 200,000 passengers had already commuted on Namma Metro. Namma Metro's first 12-day cumulative revenue was ₹10 million (US$110,000). During the first month, about 1,325,000 people traveled by metro. On average, 41,390 people took the train every day, while the average daily revenue was ₹667,262. BMRC earned a revenue of ₹21 million (US$220,000) in its first month of operation. However, average ridership during the first six months of operation was just 24,900 after the initial rush. BMRCL earned a total of ₹66 million (US$710,000) during the same period. Namma Metro posted a profit of ₹4.1 million (US$44,000) after almost one year of operating Reach I. BMRCL estimates that nearly 8 million passengers traveled on the system during its first year of operations.

Reach 2 received clearance to start services from Satish Kumar, the Commissioner for Metro Rail Safety, on 21 September 2015. Reach 2 was opened to the public on 16 November 2015.

BMRCL applied for safety clearance to open the underground stretch in the third week of March 2016. The Commissioner for Railway Safety (CRS) granted clearance to begin operations on the underground section in the first week of April 2016. The underground section was inaugurated by Union Urban Development Minister M. Venkaiah Naidu, Chief Minister Siddaramaiah and other dignitaries at a ceremony at the Vidhana Soudha on 29 April 2016. The inaugural train through the underground section departed from Vidhana Soudha station at 6:35 pm. The section was opened to the public from 6 am on 30 April 2016. Trains ran until 10 pm on the opening day, making 115 trips and transporting about 93,500 passengers, earning BMRCL a revenue of ₹35 lakh (US$37,000). The following day, 120 trips were operated on the Purple line, transporting about 125,000 passengers. On the first two days of operation, after opening of the underground section, BMRCL collected over ₹7 million in revenues from the Purple Line.

=== Phase II ===
In October 2016, the BMRCL began civil work on the west extension of the Purple Line from Mysuru Road to Kengeri (8.81 km), later extended to Challaghatta. Construction work on the Purple Line corridor was awarded in two packages for ₹ 660 crore. IL&FS Engineering Construction Company won the contract for Reach 2A of 3.94 km from Mysuru Road to Pattanagere, including four stations, at ₹ 327 crore. Soma Enterprise won the contract for Reach 2B of 4.86 km from Pattanagere to Kengeri, later extended to Challaghatta, including two stations and a depot at Challaghatta at ₹ 332 crore. The land needed for the depot at Challaghatta, about 1.5 km away from Kengeri station, was already owned by BMRCL. Later, the line extension included a new station at Challaghatta, close to the depot.

BMRCL floated tenders for the construction of the 15.5-km elevated stretch from Baiyyappanahalli to Whitefield railway station in December 2016. Reach 1A is an 8.03 km section from Baiyyappanahalli to Seetharamapalya, including six new stations, and is estimated to cost ₹ 670.72 crore. Reach 1B, the 7.21 km section from Kundalahalli to Whitefield (Kadugodi), includes seven new stations and is estimated to cost ₹ 666.12 crore. Italian-Thai Development was awarded the contracts for both packages, for a sum of ₹1,300 crore (US$140 million) in May 2017.

Around 270 buildings were demolished for the construction of Reach 1A and 1B. BMRC spent an estimated ₹ 849 crore to acquire properties. Demolition work began in March 2017, and construction work began in February 2018.

The extension from Mysore Road to Kengeri towards the southwest opened on 30 August 2021 and the extension from Krishnarajapura to Whitefield (Kadugodi) towards the east opened on 26 March 2023.

Later, trial runs began from Baiyappanahalli to Krishnarajapura with one station in between (Benniganahalli) on 26 July 2023 and from Kengeri to Challaghatta on 29 July 2023. On 9 October 2023, both the sections were opened for general use, making the whole line operational from Whitefield (Kadugodi) to Challaghatta.

=== Phase III ===
In November 2023, the Government of Karnataka announced that it planned to extend the Purple Line till Hoskote, Bengaluru North District eastwards and Bidadi and Ramanagara district headquarter in Bengaluru South (Ramanagara) District westwards in the future.

== Stations ==
There are currently 37 stations on the Purple Line. All underground stations were built using the cut-and-cover method. Most underground stations are 300 metres long and 25 metres wide, other than the interchange station at Majestic, which is much larger.

Initially, there were no toilets at Namma Metro stations. BMRCL eventually listened to public demands for toilets and the metro's first toilets were opened at Baiyyappanahalli and Indiranagar stations on 21 June 2013.

In September 2015, it was announced that the proposed Narayanapura metro station would be removed and the proposed Krishnarajapura metro station would be shifted by 295 metres to the west, due to difficulty in acquiring land in the area. In April 2016, BMRCL revealed that Whitefield metro station, originally proposed to be located 200 metres away from Whitefield railway station, would be shifted to be directly opposite the railway station to provide easier connectivity between the metro station and railway station.

Yellow tactile tiles are used at all stations to guide the visually impaired. The tiles start at the ramp and lead to the staircases and lifts.

=== Interchanges ===
Passenger interchange facilities, connecting to other metro and railway lines, will be provided at the following stations:

- Whitefield (Kadugodi) (connects to the Whitefield railway station)
- Krishnarajapura (connects to the Blue Line, which runs between Central Silk Board and KIAL Terminals, also connects to the Krishnarajapuram railway station)
- Mahatma Gandhi Road (connects to the Pink Line, which runs between Nagawara and Kalena Agrahara)
- Sir M. Visveshwaraya station, Central College (connects to the Red Line, which runs between Hebbala and Sarjapura)
- Nadaprabhu Kempegowda station, Majestic (connects to the Green Line, which runs between Madavara and Silk Institute, also connects to the KSR Bengaluru railway station and Kempegowda Bus Station)
- Krantivira Sangolli Rayanna Railway Station (connects to the KSR Bengaluru railway station)
- Hosahalli (connects to the Grey Line, which runs between Hosahalli and Kadabagere)
- Mysuru Road (connects to the Orange Line, which runs between Kempapura and JP Nagar 4th Phase)

Purple Line
#	Station name		Opening	Connections	Station type	Platform type
#	English	Kannada	Opening	Connections	Station type	Platform type
1	Whitefield (Kadugodi)	ವೈಟ್‌ಫೀಲ್ಡ್ (ಕಾಡುಗೋಡಿ)	26 March 2023	Whitefield; Kadugodi TTMC	Elevated	Side
2	Hopefarm Channasandra	ಹೋಪ್ ಫಾರ್ಮ್ ಚನ್ನಸಂದ್ರ	26 March 2023		Elevated	Side
3	Kadugodi Tree Park	ಕಾಡುಗೋಡಿ ಟ್ರೀ ಪಾರ್ಕ್	26 March 2023		Elevated	Side
4	Pattandur Agrahara	ಪಟ್ಟಂದೂರು ಅಗ್ರಹಾರ	26 March 2023		Elevated	Side
5	Sri Sathya Sai Hospital	ಶ್ರೀ ಸತ್ಯ ಸಾಯಿ ಆಸ್ಪತ್ರೆ	26 March 2023		Elevated	Side
6	Nallurhalli	ನಲ್ಲೂರುಹಳ್ಳಿ	26 March 2023	Whitefield TTMC	Elevated	Side
7	Kundalahalli	ಕುಂದಲಹಳ್ಳಿ	26 March 2023		Elevated	Side
8	Seetharampalya	ಸೀತಾರಾಮ ಪಾಳ್ಯ	26 March 2023		Elevated	Side
9	Hoodi	ಹೂಡಿ	26 March 2023	Hoodi Halt	Elevated	Side
10	Garudacharpalya	ಗರುಡಾಚಾರ್‍‍ಪಾಳ್ಯ	26 March 2023		Elevated	Side
11	Singayyanapalya	ಸಿಂಗಯ್ಯನಪಾಳ್ಯ	26 March 2023		Elevated	Side
12	Krishnarajapura (K.R.Pura)	ಕೃಷ್ಣರಾಜಪುರ (ಕೆ.ಆರ್.ಪುರ)	26 March 2023	Blue Line (Under Construction); Krishnarajapuram	Elevated	Side
13	Benniganahalli	ಬೆನ್ನಿಗಾನಹಳ್ಳಿ	9 October 2023		Elevated	Side
14	Baiyappanahalli	ಬೈಯ್ಯಪ್ಪನಹಳ್ಳಿ	20 October 2011	Baiyyappanahalli	At Grade	Side
15	Swami Vivekananda Road	ಸ್ವಾಮಿ ವಿವೇಕಾನಂದ ರಸ್ತೆ	20 October 2011		Elevated	Side
16	Indiranagar	ಇಂದಿರಾನಗರ	20 October 2011		Elevated	Side
17	Halasuru	ಹಲಸೂರು	20 October 2011		Elevated	Side
18	Trinity	ಟ್ರಿನಿಟಿ	20 October 2011		Elevated	Side
19	Mahatma Gandhi Road	ಮಹಾತ್ಮಾ ಗಾಂಧಿ ರಸ್ತೆ	20 October 2011	Pink Line (Under Construction)	Elevated	Side
20	Cubbon Park	ಕಬ್ಬನ್ ಪಾರ್ಕ್	30 April 2016		Underground	Island
21	Dr. B.R. Ambedkar Station, Vidhana Soudha	ಡಾ. ಬಿ ಆರ್ ಅಂಬೇಡ್ಕರ್ ನಿಲ್ದಾಣ, ವಿಧಾನ ಸೌಧ	30 April 2016		Underground	Island
22	Sir M. Visvesvaraya Station, Central College	ಸರ್ ಎಂ. ವಿಶ್ವೇಶ್ವರಯ್ಯ ನಿಲ್ದಾಣ, ಸೆಂಟ್ರಲ್ ಕಾಲೇಜು	30 April 2016	Red Line (Approved)	Underground	Island
23	Nadaprabhu Kempegowda Station, Majestic	ನಾಡಪ್ರಭು ಕೆಂಪೇಗೌಡ ನಿಲ್ದಾಣ, ಮೆಜೆಸ್ಟಿಕ್	30 April 2016	Green Line; KSR Bengaluru; Kempegowda Bus Station	Underground	Side & Island
24	Krantivira Sangolli Rayanna Railway Station	ಕ್ರಾಂತಿವೀರ ಸಂಗೊಳ್ಳಿ ರಾಯಣ್ಣ ರೈಲು ನಿಲ್ದಾಣ	30 April 2016	KSR Bengaluru	Underground	Island
25	Magadi Road	ಮಾಗಡಿ ರಸ್ತೆ	16 November 2015		Elevated	Side
26	Sri Balagangadharanatha Swamiji Station, Hosahalli	ಶ್ರೀ ಬಾಲಗಂಗಾಧರನಾಥ ಸ್ವಾಮೀಜಿ ನಿಲ್ದಾಣ, ಹೊಸಹಳ್ಳಿ	16 November 2015	Grey Line (Approved)	Elevated	Side
27	Vijayanagara	ವಿಜಯನಗರ	16 November 2015		Elevated	Side
28	Attiguppe	ಅತ್ತಿಗುಪ್ಪೆ	16 November 2015	Vijayanagara TTMC	Elevated	Side
29	Deepanjali Nagar	ದೀಪಾಂಜಲಿ ನಗರ	16 November 2015		Elevated	Side
30	Mysuru Road	ಮೈಸೂರು ರಸ್ತೆ	16 November 2015	Orange Line (Phase III)	Elevated	Side
31	Pantharapalya - Nayandahalli	ಪಂತರಪಾಳ್ಯ - ನಾಯಂಡಹಳ್ಳಿ	30 August 2021		Elevated	Side
32	Rajarajeshwari Nagar	ರಾಜರಾಜೇಶ್ವರಿ ನಗರ	30 August 2021		Elevated	Side
33	Jnanabharathi	ಜ್ಞಾನಭಾರತಿ	30 August 2021	Jnanabharathi Halt	Elevated	Side
34	Pattanagere	ಪಟ್ಟಣಗರೆ	30 August 2021		Elevated	Side
35	Kengeri Bus Terminal	ಕೆಂಗೇರಿ ಬಸ್ ಟರ್ಮಿನಲ್	30 August 2021	Kengeri TTMC	Elevated	Side
36	Kengeri	ಕೆಂಗೇರಿ	30 August 2021	Kengeri	Elevated	Side
37	Challaghatta	ಚಲ್ಲಘಟ್ಟ	9 October 2023		Elevated	Side

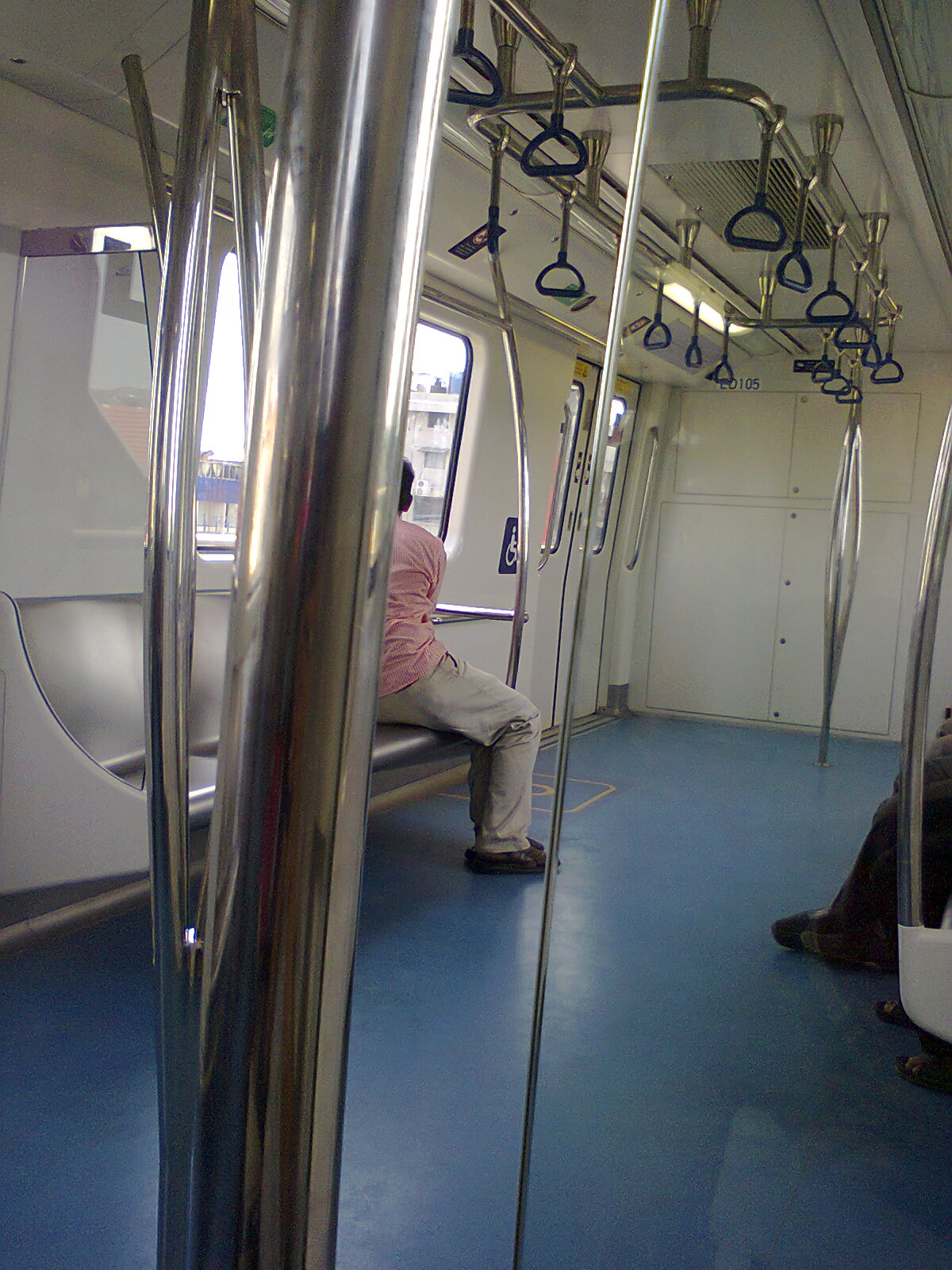
Interior of the Metro coach

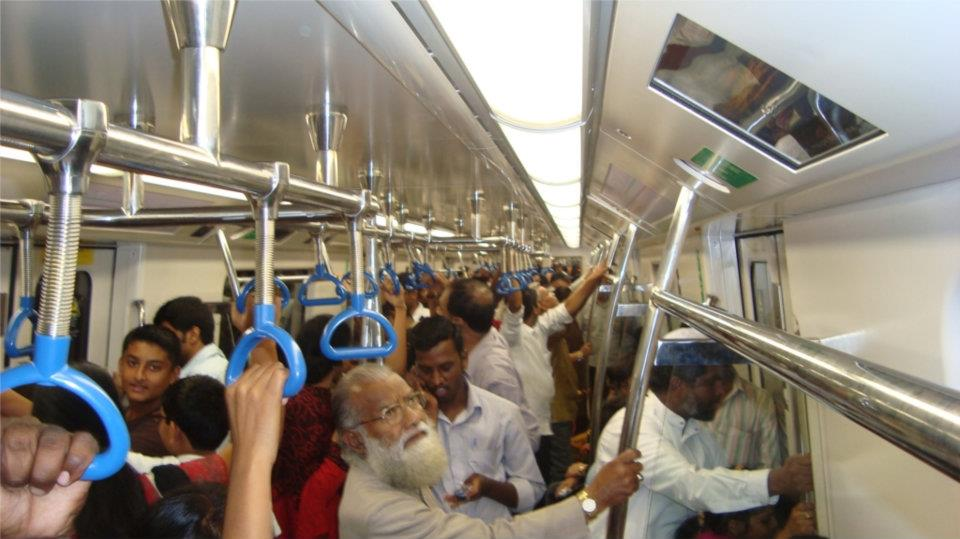
Interior of the Metro coach on inauguration day

== Infrastructure ==
=== Rolling stock ===
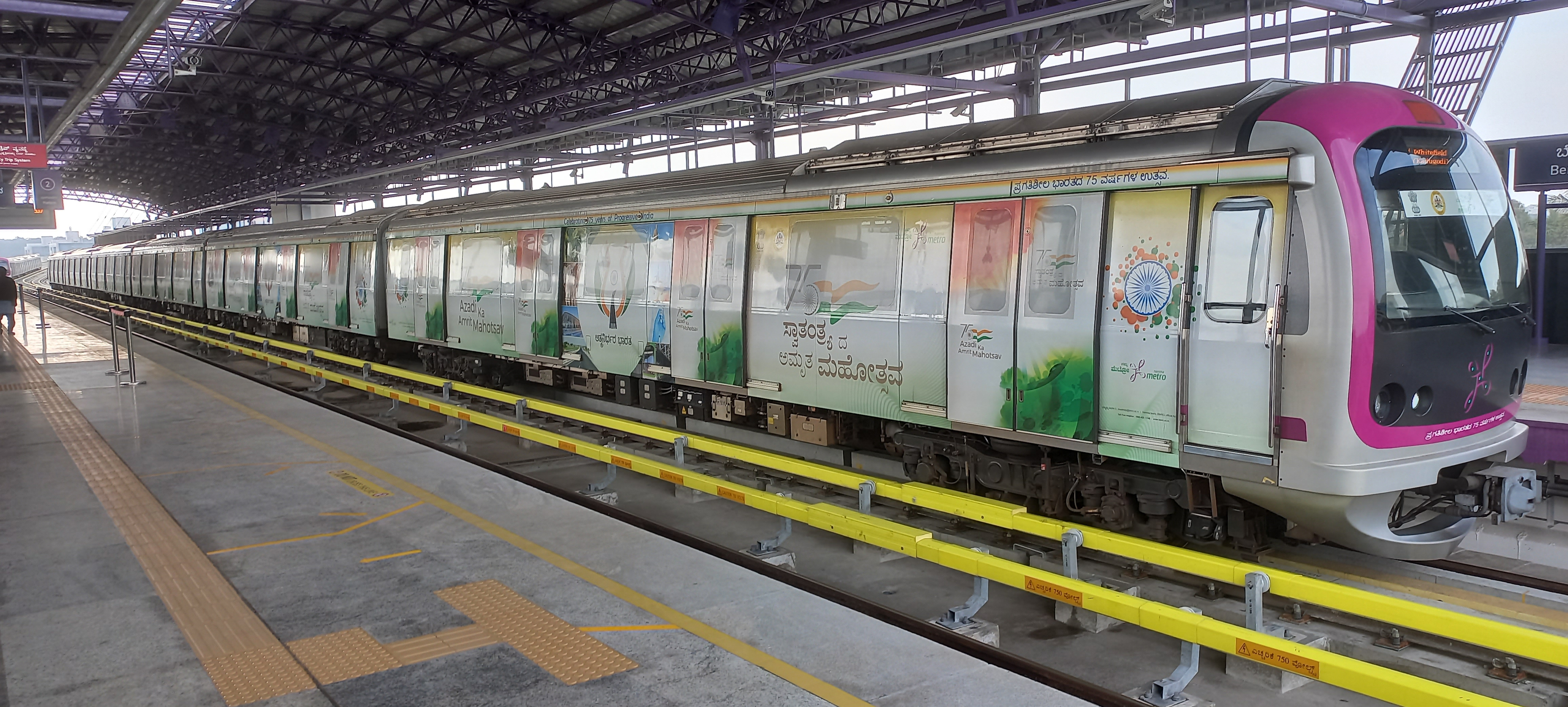
Special Livery of this line with the slogan "75 Years of Azadi Ka Amrit Mahotsav"

BMRC procured 150 metro coaches for fifty 3-car train sets for Phase l of Namma Metro from BEML-Hyundai Rotem at a cost of ₹1,672.50 crore (₹16.72 billion). Coaches were 20.8 metres (68 ft) long, 2.88 metres (9.4 ft) wide and 3.8 metres (12 ft) high. Each coach has a seating capacity of about 50 and standing capacity of approximately 306, making each train have a capacity of about 1000. Traction was through four 180 kW motors in each motor coach. The trains have a maximum speed of 80 km/h, axle load of 15 tonnes, and operate on 750 volt direct current with third rail power collection. The coaches are made of stainless steel and are fully air-conditioned, and contain longitudinal banks of seats, wide vestibules between coaches, non-skid and non-slip floor surfaces, four wide passenger access doors on each side, an automatic voice announcement system and electronic information and destination displays.

Initial operations on the Purple Line began with twenty-one 3-coach trains. As loads increased with increasing ridership, all trains were converted to six coaches. The first six car train was introduced on the Purple Line on 23 June 2018. The additional coaches were supplied by BEML at a cost of Rs 8.8 crore each.

=== Signaling ===
In September 2009, a consortium led by Alstom Project India Limited was awarded a contract worth ₹563.4 crore (US$60.2 million) to supply control and signalling system for the first phase of the project. The consortium is led by Alstom and composed of Alstom Transport SA, Thales Group Portugal S A and Sumitomo Corporation. Alstom will provide the design, manufacture, supply, installing, testing and commissioning of the train control and signalling system and Thales will provide the design, installing, testing and commissioning of the telecommunication system for Phase I of the metro system. It includes the Urbalis 200 Automatic Train Control system which will ensure optimal safety, flexible operations and heightened passenger comfort.

The integrated control centre at Baiyyappanahalli has direct communication with trains and stations, which are fitted with CCTV with visual and audio service information.

== Operations ==
=== Frequency ===
Frequency
General Services								Short Loop Services				
Origin Station	Terminal Station	Monday & 1st/3rd/5th Saturday			Sunday			From & To		Monday & 1st/3rd/5th Saturday		
Origin Station	Terminal Station	From	To	Frequency	From	To	Frequency	From & To		From	To	Frequency (Average)
Whitefield (Kadugodi)	Challaghatta	05:00	05:20	20 Minutes	7:00	10:33	10 Minutes	Majestic	Whitefield (Kadugodi)	8:44	10:24	3.3 Minutes
Whitefield (Kadugodi)	Challaghatta	05:20	10:57	10 Minutes	10:33	20:01	8 Minutes	Mysuru Road	Garudacharpalya	7:48	9:01	10 Minutes
Whitefield (Kadugodi)	Challaghatta	10:57	15:21	8 Minutes	20:01	22:31	10 Minutes	Pattandur Agrahara	Mysuru Road	17:56	19:56	5 Minutes
Whitefield (Kadugodi)	Challaghatta	15:21	22:01	10 Minutes	22:31	22:45	14 Minutes	Baiyappanahalli	Mysuru Road	16:19	20:19	5 Minutes
Whitefield (Kadugodi)	Challaghatta	22:01	22:45	15 Minutes				General Services				
Challaghatta	Whitefield (Kadugodi)	05:00	05:20	20 Minutes	7:00	7:50	15 Minutes	Origin Station	Terminal Station	Public holidays & 2nd/4th Saturday		
Challaghatta	Whitefield (Kadugodi)	05:20	06:00	15 Minutes	7:50	12:00	10 Minutes	Origin Station	Terminal Station	From	To	Frequency
Challaghatta	Whitefield (Kadugodi)	06:00	06:54	11 Minutes	12:00	21:38	8 Minutes	Whitefield (Kadugodi)	Challaghatta	5:00	7:14	10 Minutes
Challaghatta	Whitefield (Kadugodi)	06:54	12:20	10 Minutes	21:38	23:05	10 Minutes	Whitefield (Kadugodi)	Challaghatta	7:14	20:01	8 Minutes
Challaghatta	Whitefield (Kadugodi)	12:20	16:45	8 Minutes				Whitefield (Kadugodi)	Challaghatta	20:01	22:31	10 Minutes
Challaghatta	Whitefield (Kadugodi)	16:45	23:05	10 Minutes				Whitefield (Kadugodi)	Challaghatta	22:31	22:45	14 Minutes
Garudacharpalya	Challaghatta	06:53	10:55	5 Minutes				Challaghatta	Whitefield (Kadugodi)	5:00	8:56	10 Minutes
Garudacharpalya	Challaghatta	10:55	17:10	5 Minutes				Challaghatta	Whitefield (Kadugodi)	8:56	21:38	8 Minutes
Garudacharpalya	Challaghatta	17:10	20:10	5 Minutes				Challaghatta	Whitefield (Kadugodi)	21:38	23:05	10 Minutes
Mysuru Road	Whitefield (Kadugodi)	07:22	10:22	5 Minutes								
Mysuru Road	Whitefield (Kadugodi)	17:02	21:02	5 Minutes								

The metro service runs from 5 am and 12 am daily. The end-to-end travel time on a Purple Line train is 82 minutes. From 7 November 2016, Purple Line trains began running at an interval of every 4 minutes between 9:10 am and 9:58 am to handle rising passenger traffic during morning peak hour; this timing was later withdrawn as the trains were not operating at optimal capacity. From 27 February 2017, the BMRC introduced a new time-table for weekdays. Headways on the line was changed to 4 minutes from 08:30 to 09:10, 7 minutes from 07:00 to 08:30 and 09:10 to 10:40, 8 minutes from 16:00 to 20:40 and 15 minutes at all other times.

Metro services have occasionally operated beyond 22:00 hours. Services are usually extended on festival days or when an international cricket match is being held in Bengaluru.

=== Speed ===
The system is designed for a maximum train speed of 80 km/h. However, the Research Design and Standards Organization (RDSO) fixed the speed at which trains are allowed to commercially operate at 67.50 km/h on straight sections, 35 km/h on curves, and 45 km/h in stations. The maximum permitted speed on the underground section is 40 km/h. Purple Line trains usually operate at speeds of 38–40 km/h. According to metro authorities, the trains require more than 400 metres to accelerate from, or decelerate to a halt. As the inter-station distance on the line is about 1 km, the trains have limited time to run at higher speeds.

=== Fare collection ===
The fare between both termini of the Purple Line is ₹90 (96¢ US). Commuters who pay using smart cards receive a 5% discount per transaction.

As of April 2016, 37.59% of commuters on the Purple Line use smart cards, while the rest purchase tokens.

=== Safety ===
All stations on the line have 4 emergency exits, and Majestic station has 18 emergency exits. Stations have been built to withstand zone III earthquakes. The tunnels are equipped with walkways to help passengers to disembark from a train and walk to the nearest station in case of a technical failure. The underground section is also equipped with 5 cross-passages that will enable passengers to move between tunnels, in case a tunnel section fills up with smoke. There are three tunnel cross-passages between Majestic and Sir M Visvesvaraya metro station, and one each between Vidhana Soudha and Central College, and Majestic and City Railway station. All stations were built with flame retardant materials, and have 100,000 litres of water stored on-site for use in case of a fire.

Namma Metro has a dedicated fire team to take care of operations and maintenance of the firefighting system installed in metro stations. They conduct regular mock exercises and liaison with the state fire department for any assistance in case of a fire emergency.

== See also ==
- Namma Metro
  - Green Line
  - Yellow Line
  - Pink Line
  - Blue Line
  - Orange Line
  - Grey Line
  - Red Line
  - Inner Ring Line
- List of Namma Metro stations
- Rapid transit in India
- List of metro systems
