= Jnanabharati Halt railway station =

Railway station in Bangalore, India

Coordinates: 12.9351°N 77.5111°E

Jnanabharati Halt

General information
- Location: Bangalore, Karnataka; India
- System: Indian Railways station
- Owner: Indian Railways
- Operator: South Western Railway zone
- Line: Mysore–Bangalore railway line
- Platforms: 2
- Tracks: 2
- Connections: Purple Line Jnanabharathi, Auto stand, Bus and Taxi

Construction
- Structure type: Standard (on-ground station)
- Parking: Yes
- Cycle facilities: No

Other information
- Status: Functioning
- Station code: GNB
- Fare zone: South Western Railway zone

Services
Preceding station	Indian Railways	Following station
Kengeri towards Mysore	South Western Railway zone Mysore–Bangalore City line	Nayandahalli towards Bangalore
Route map
Location

Jnanabharati Halt (station code: GNB) is a small railway station located in Bangalore, Karnataka, India. It primarily serves the Jnanabharati campus of Bangalore University and nearby localities. The station lies on the Mysore–Bangalore railway line and is operated by the South Western Railway zone under the Bangalore railway division.

The station consists of two platforms, which are basic in structure and primarily serve MEMU trains. It provides convenient access for students, university staff, and residents in nearby areas such as Nagarabhavi, Malagala, and Kengeri. It is especially useful for those commuting to educational institutions like Bangalore University and the National Law School of India University.

== See also ==
- Bangalore University
- Bengaluru Suburban Railway
- South Western Railway zone
