= Kengeri railway station =

Railway station in Karnataka, India

Kengeri (KGI) केन्गेरी ಕೆಂಗೇರಿ
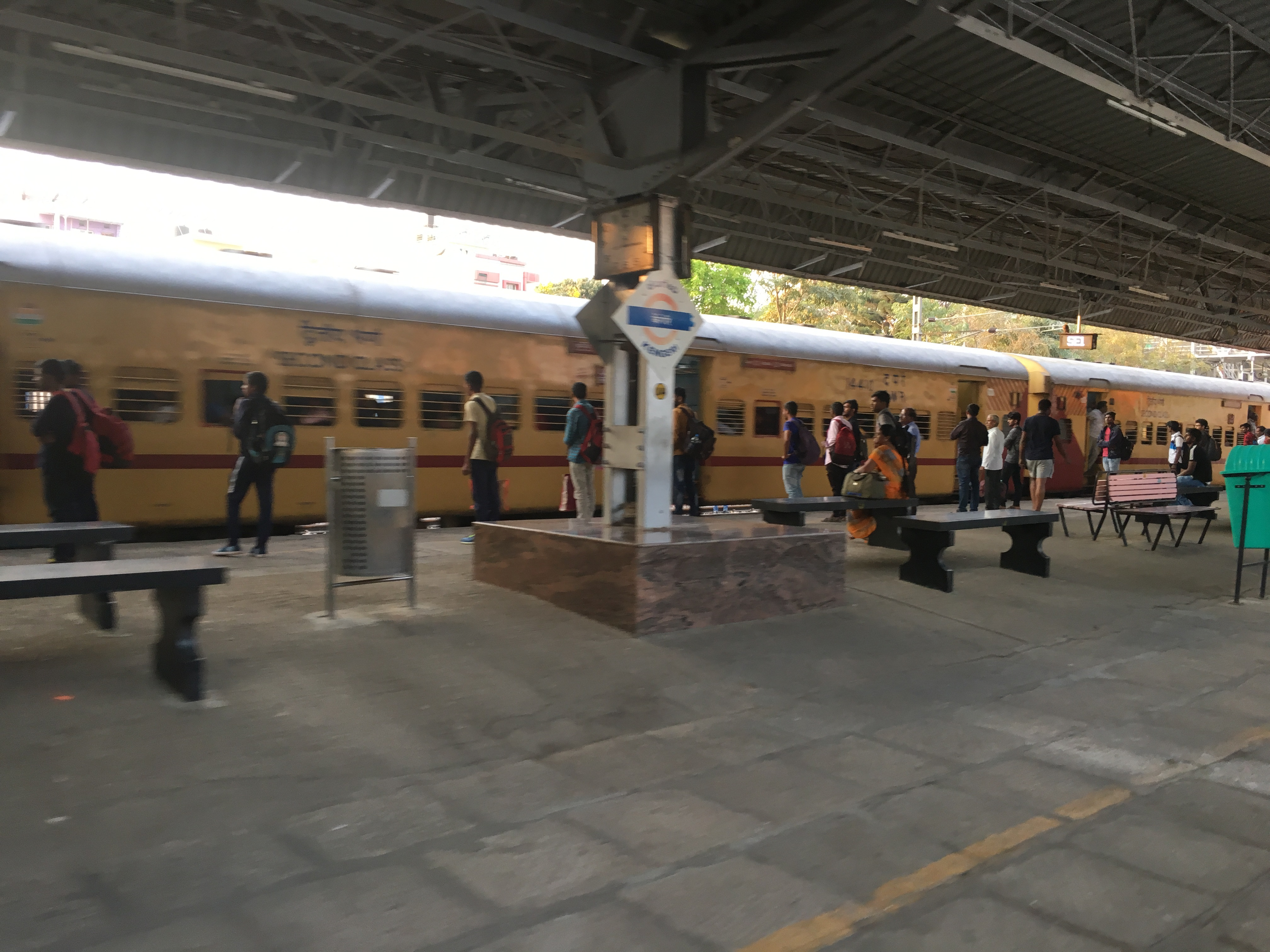

General information
- Location: Railway Parallel Rd, Stage 1, Old Outer Ring Road, Kengeri Satellite Town, Bangalore, Karnataka; India
- Coordinates: 12.9176°N 77.4839°E
- Elevation: 804 metres (2,638 ft)
- System: Indian Railways station
- Owner: Indian Railways
- Operator: South Western Railway zone
- Line: Mysore–Bangalore railway line
- Platforms: 4
- Tracks: 4
- Connections: Purple Line Kengeri, Kengeri BMTC Bus Terminal, Kengeri Satellite Town Bus Stop, Kengeri Railway Station BMTC Bus Terminal, taxi, auto

Construction
- Structure type: Standard (on-ground station)
- Parking: Yes
- Cycle facilities: Yes

Other information
- Status: Functioning
- Station code: KGI
- Zone(s): South Western Railway zone
- Division(s): Bangalore

Services
Preceding station	Indian Railways	Following station
Hejjala towards Mysore	South Western Railway zone Mysore–Bangalore City line	Jnanabharati Halt towards Bangalore
Route map
Location

Kengeri railway station (station code: KGI) is a major railway station on the Mysuru–Bengaluru railway line within the city limits of Bengaluru in the Indian State of Karnataka. It is about 10 km south-west to the centre of city. It is an important railway station within the city limits that include KSR Bengaluru, Yeshwantpur Jn. and Bengaluru Cantt, SMVT Bengaluru, Yelahanka, Krishnarajapuram and Whitefield. It has 4 platforms. It is well connected, with a metro station on the Purple line nearby.

== Location ==
It serves the Kengeri and Kengeri Satellite Town neighborhoods in the western part of the city. It is a popular railway station among residents of west Bengaluru because of its proximity to the Namma Metro Purple Line and the Bangalore Metropolitan Transport Corporation (BMTC) bus stand.

== Infrastructure ==
The station consists of four platforms. It has five ticket counters and two digital ticket kiosks in the terminus. It has a digital sign board. It has a digital large clock in the first platform. It has a number of stalls for food and a Nandini milk parlour. It also has IRCTC Stall. It has two public toilets one in the first platform and the other in the second and third platforms. The second and third platforms are covered with an overhead shelter. It has a foot overbridge over the train tracks connecting all the platforms. It also has a free Wi-Fi service provided by Google Station. The second and third platforms have electronic boards to mention a train's number, the class of the coach which is going to stop at that point a couple of moments before the train's arrival. It has newly established LED TVs for the info of the train to the passengers. It has a large space for two wheeler 4 wheeler and bicycle parking. It has six ticket counters to book tickets. Currently, the station is being modernized under the Amrit Bharat Station Scheme (ABSS).

== Line ==
The station is on the Mysuru – KSR Bengaluru railway line . Platforms 3 and 4 serve for trains going towards Mysuru Junction and platforms 1 and 2 serve for trains going towards KSR Bengaluru City Junction and Yesvantpur Junction.

== See also ==
- Mysore–Bangalore railway line
