= Challaghatta metro station =

Namma Metro's Purple Line terminal metro station

Challaghatta
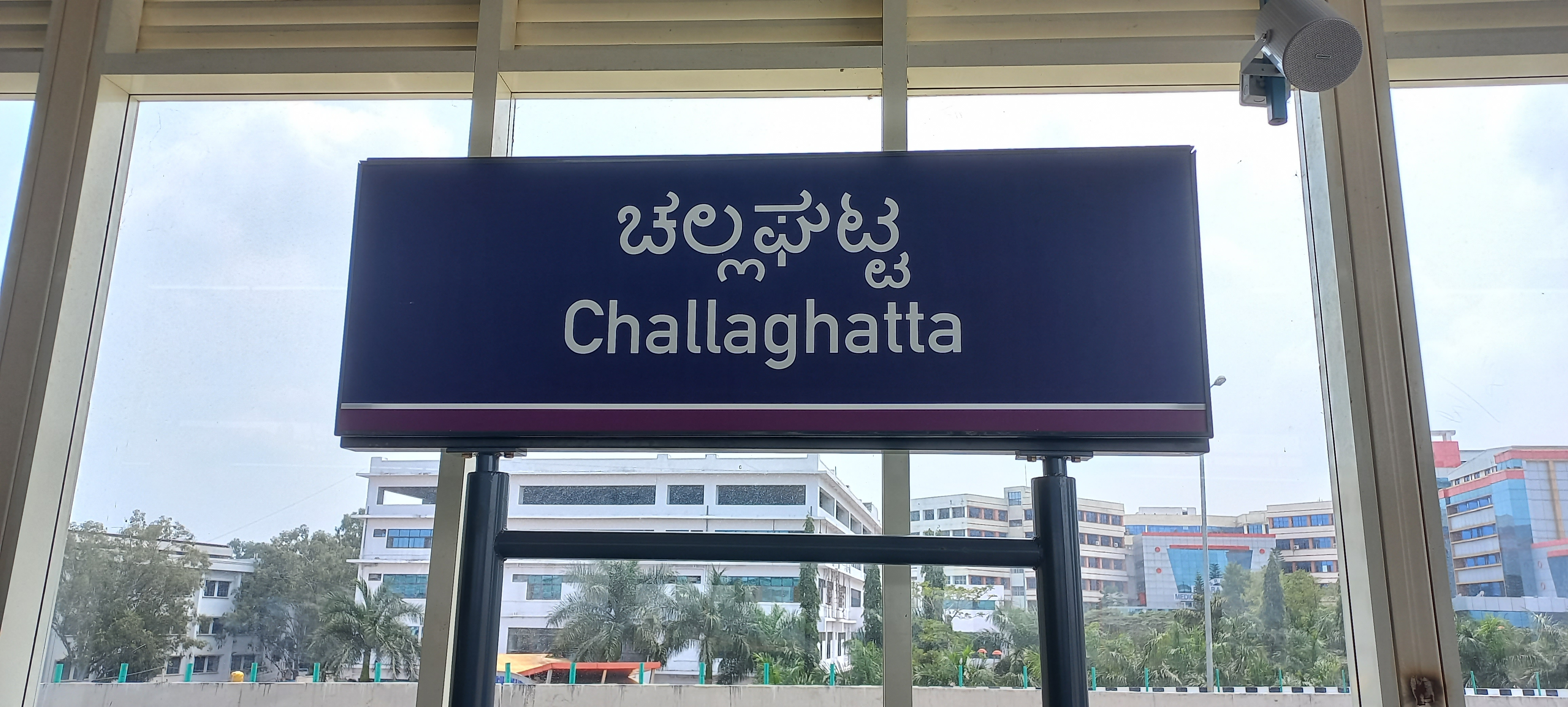
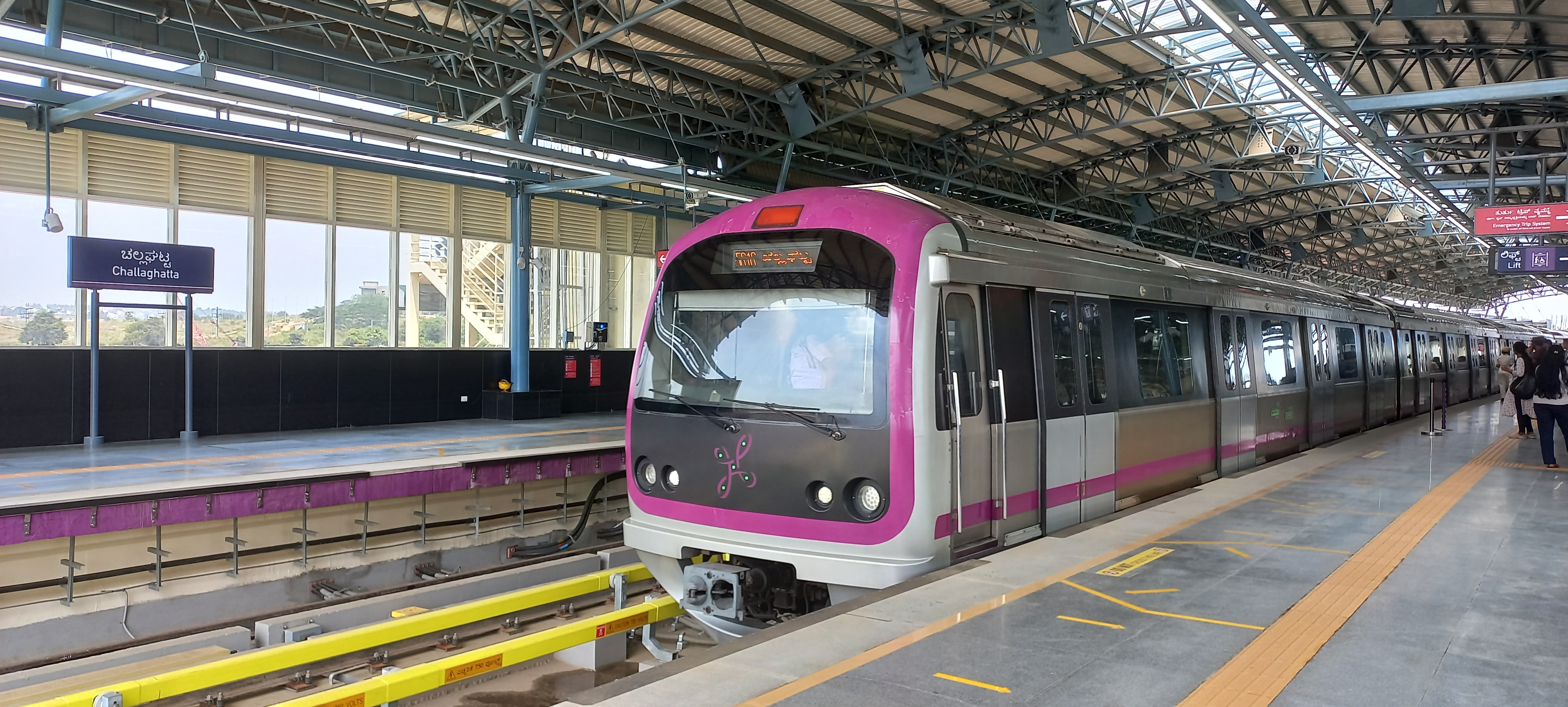
- Namma Metro train terminating at this metro station

General information
- Location: Mysore Main Road, Mysore Rd, BSM Extension, Kengeri Satellite Town, Bengaluru, Karnataka 560060
- Coordinates: 12.89742°N 77.46124°E
- System: Namma Metro
- Owner: Bangalore Metro Rail Corporation Ltd (BMRCL)
- Operator: Namma Metro
- Line: Purple Line
- Platforms: Side platform Platform-1 → Whitefield (Kadugodi); Platform-2 → Train Terminates Here
- Tracks: 2

Construction
- Structure type: Elevated, Double track
- Platform levels: 2
- Parking: Two Wheeler only
- Accessible: Yes
- Architect: Soma Enterprise Ltd.

Other information
- Status: Operational & Staffed
- Station code: CLGA

History
- Opened: 9 October 2023; 3 years ago
- Electrified: 750 V DC third rail

Services
Preceding station	Namma Metro	Following station
Kengeri towards Whitefield (Kadugodi)	Purple Line	Terminus
Route map
Location

Challaghatta is the elevated western terminal metro station on the East-West corridor of the Purple Line of Namma Metro in the Bengaluru border, India. It is on a 2.05 km extension from Kengeri metro station. Alongside the station passes the main Bengaluru - Mysuru NH 275 Expressway which leads towards the cities of Mysore and Mangalore. Trial runs on the new Kengeri - Challaghatta section of the line commenced on 29 July 2023. The station was opened and scheduled services commenced on 9 October 2023. No inauguration ceremony was held, but the new section of line was virtually inaugurated by Prime Minister Modi on 20 October 2023.

== History ==
In the 2011 plans for Phase 2 of the Metro extension, its western terminus was to be at Kengeri, where a train depot was to be built. However, the anticipated site could not be procured and so plans were revised to construct the depot and a further Metro station at Challaghatta. The Karnataka government gave approval for the station in January 2019. The station was scheduled to open by March 2022 but delays put down by an official of the Bangalore Metro Rail Corporation Limited to "land acquisition issues", complications in building the overhead structure and labour shortages from waves of COVID-19 set back the project.

Challaghatta is the smallest of the Phase I and II Bengaluru Metro stations and unlike the others, this metro station has no concourse. The distance from the train to the stairs and escalators is half that found at most other Metro stations. The station has two each of staircases, lifts and escalators. It is anticipated that between five and six hundred travellers will use the station daily.

Shortly after opening, access to the station was criticised by students at nearby colleges, who must cross a busy road to reach the entrance. A pedestrian bridge over the road scheduled for construction by National Highways Authority of India has been delayed.

According to estate agents, the station has led to a significant increase in property prices in the area.

== Station layout ==
P	Side Platform | Doors will open on the left
P	Platform 1 Eastbound	Towards → Whitefield (Kadugodi); Next Station: Kengeri
P	Platform 2 Westbound	Towards ← Train Terminates Here
P	Side Platform | Doors will open on the left
G/C	Street level and Concourse	Exit/Entrance, Fare control, station agent, Metro Card vending machines, crossover

== Entry/Exit ==
There are 2 Entry/Exit points - A and B. Commuters can use either of the points for their travel.

- Entry/Exit point A: Towards Mysore Road side
- Entry/Exit point B: Towards Challaghatta side.

== Nearby ==
- Rajarajeswari Medical College and Hospital
- ACS College of Engineering iON Digital zone

== See also ==
- Bangalore
- List of Namma Metro stations
- Transport in Karnataka
- List of metro systems
- List of rapid transit systems in India
- Bangalore Metropolitan Transport Corporation
