= Whitefield (Kadugodi) metro station =

Namma Metro's Purple Line terminal metro station

Whitefield (Kadugodi)
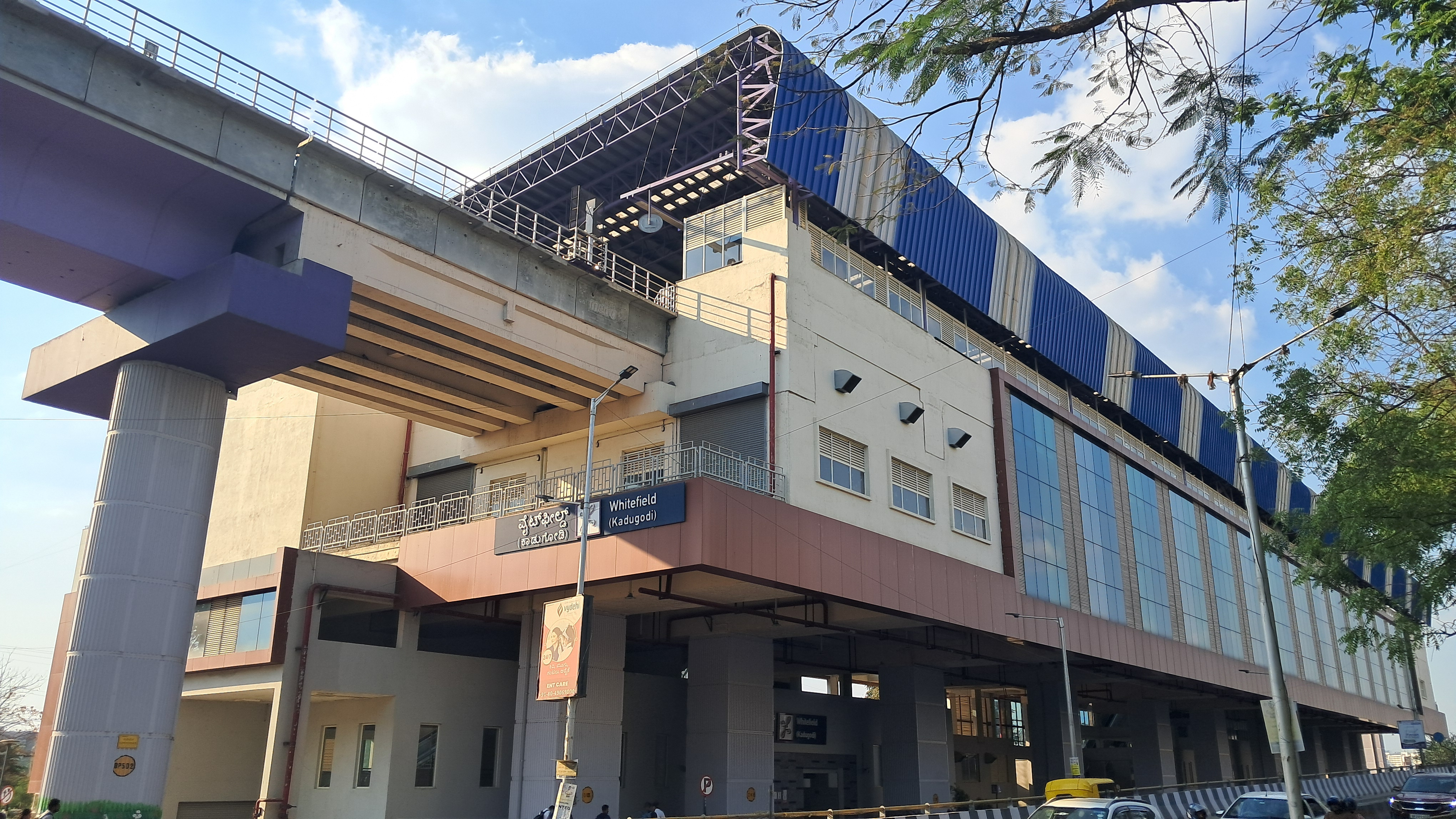
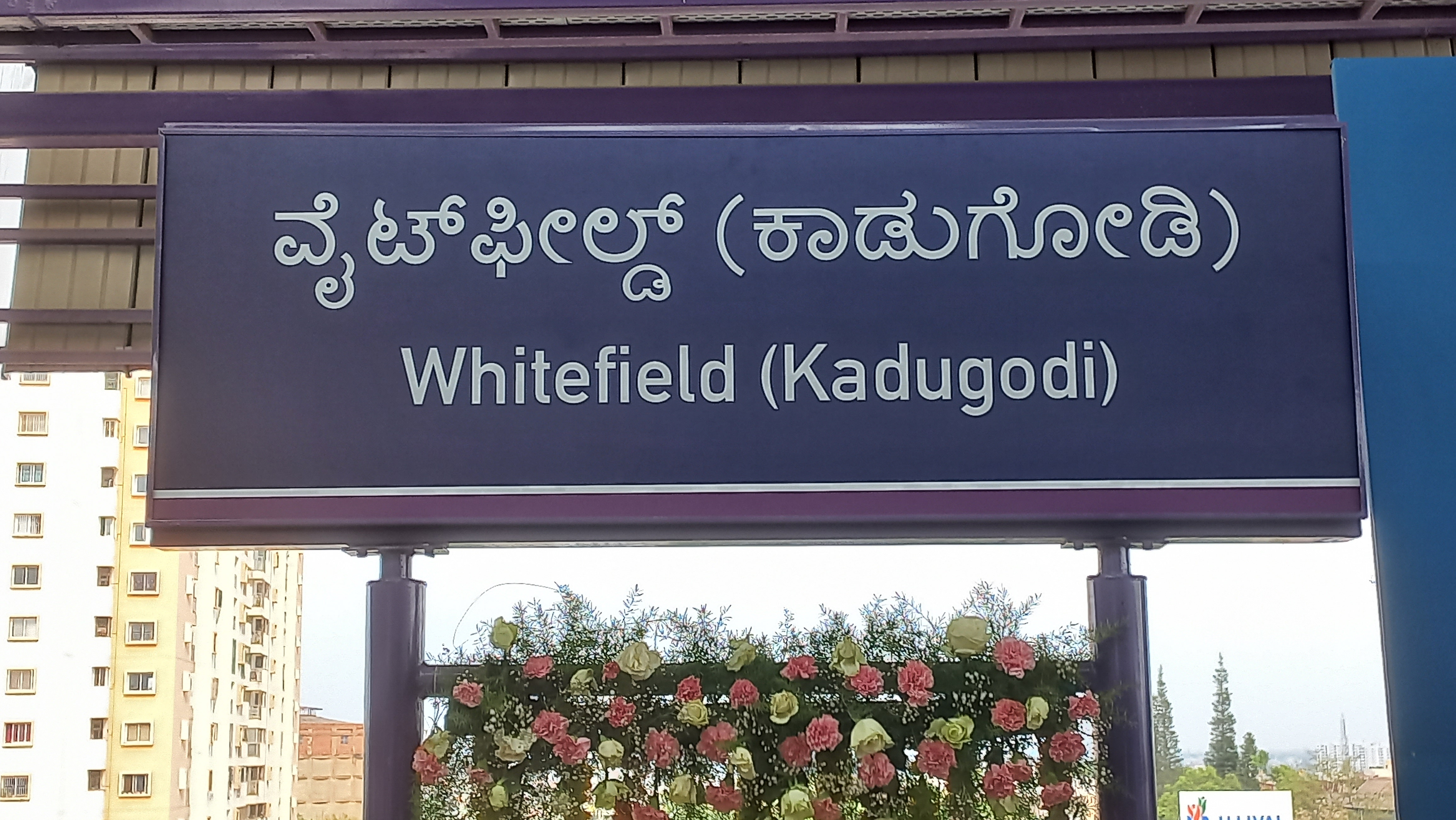
- Whitefield (Kadugodi) Metro Station

General information
- Other names: Whitefield
- Location: Kadugodi Colony, Maithri Layout, Kadugodi, Bengaluru, Karnataka 560067
- Coordinates: 12.99507°N 77.75777°E
- System: Namma Metro station
- Owner: Bangalore Metro Rail Corporation Ltd (BMRCL)
- Operator: Namma Metro
- Line: Purple Line
- Platforms: Side platform Platform-1 → Train Terminates Here; Platform-2 → Challaghatta
- Tracks: 2
- Connections: Whitefield

Construction
- Structure type: Elevated
- Platform levels: 2
- Parking: Two Wheeler only
- Accessible: Yes
- Architect: ITD - ITD Cementation India JV

Other information
- Status: Staffed
- Station code: WHTM

History
- Opened: 26 March 2023; 3 years ago
- Electrified: 750 V DC third rail

Services
| Preceding station | Namma Metro | Following station |
|---|---|---|
| Terminus | Purple Line | Hopefarm Channasandra towards Challaghatta |
Route map
Location
- /0/queryThe property query is required; /0/idsThe property ids is required; /0Failed to match at least one schema; /0/titleThe property title is required; /0/serviceThe property service is required; /0Failed to match exactly one schema; /0/typeDoes not have a value in the enumeration ["ExternalData"]; /0/properties/marker-colorDoes not match the regex pattern ^#?([0-9a-fA-F]{3}){1,2}$; /0/geometriesThe property geometries is required; /0/typeDoes not have a value in the enumeration ["GeometryCollection"]; /0/typeDoes not have a value in the enumeration ["MultiPolygon"]; /0/typeDoes not have a value in the enumeration ["Point"]; /0/typeDoes not have a value in the enumeration ["MultiPoint"]; /0/typeDoes not have a value in the enumeration ["LineString"]; /0/typeDoes not have a value in the enumeration ["MultiLineString"]; /0/typeDoes not have a value in the enumeration ["Polygon"]; /0/coordinatesThe property coordinates is required; /0/featuresThe property features is required; /0/typeDoes not have a value in the enumeration ["FeatureCollection"]

Whitefield (Kadugodi) (formerly known as Whitefield) is the elevated eastern terminal metro station on the east–west corridor of the Purple Line of Namma Metro in Bengaluru, India which serves the main Whitefield neighbourhood area. Around this station is the Whitefield railway station, followed by some locations like Whitefield Traffic Police Station, Kadugodi Police Station, Kadugodi Bus Terminus, MJR Pearl Apartment, BSNL Telephone Service Center, Sri Sathya Sai Baba Ashram and many more.

The Whitefield - Krishnarajapura trial runs were successfully conducted from 25 October for a month. This metro station was inaugurated on March 25, 2023, by Prime Minister Narendra Modi and was opened to the public on March 26, 2023.

== Station layout ==
| L2 | Side Platform | Doors will open on the left |
| L2 | Platform 1 Eastbound | Towards → Train Terminates Here |
| L2 | Platform 2 Westbound | Towards ← Challaghatta; Next Station: Hopefarm Channasandra |
| L2 | Side Platform | Doors will open on the left |
| L1 | Concourse | Fare control, station agent, Metro Card vending machines, crossover |
| G | Street level | Exit/Entrance |

== Connections ==
The metro station is connected with Whitefield of Indian Railways network. It is also connected with Kadugodi BMTC Terminus for City Bus Services.

== Gallery ==
Some of this metro station timeline pictures are shown below:-

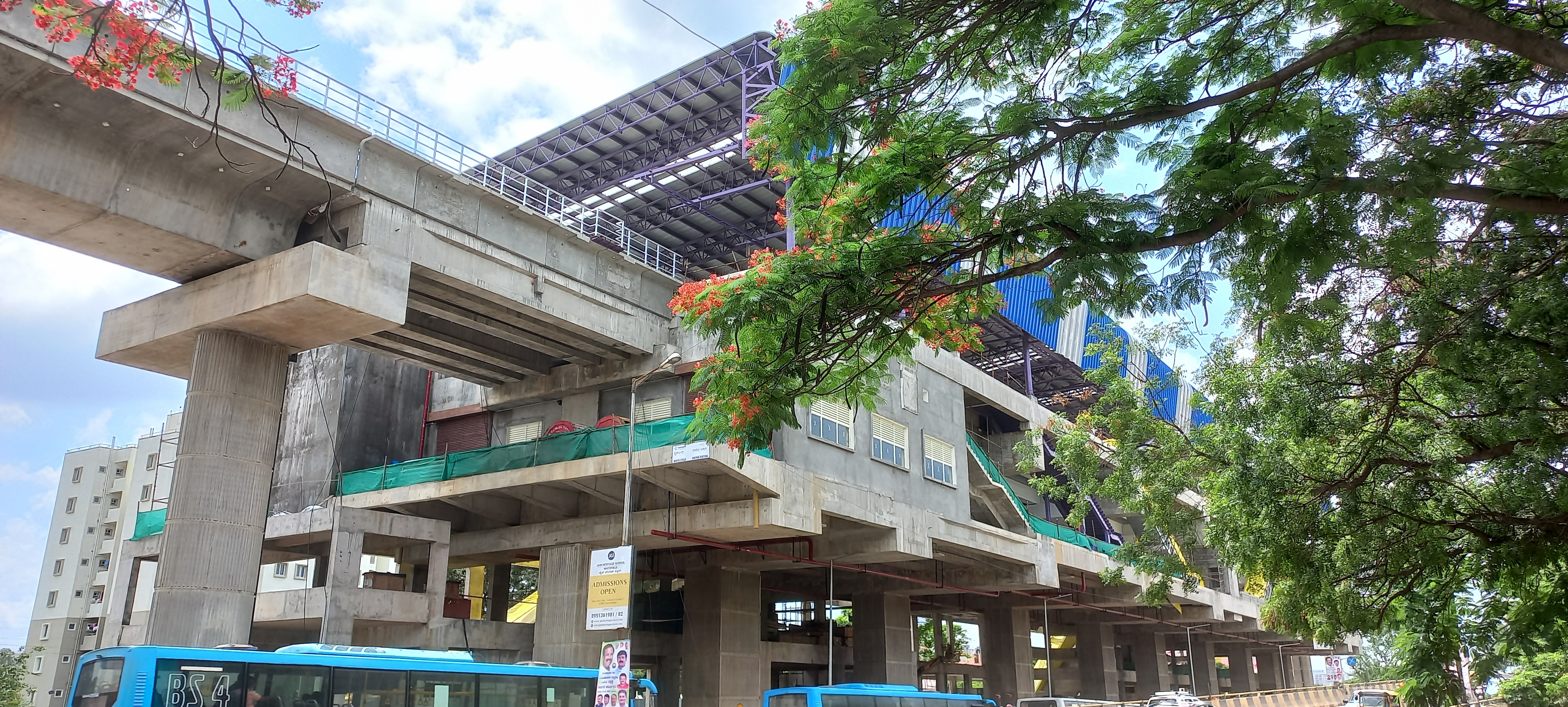
Under Construction as of June 2022

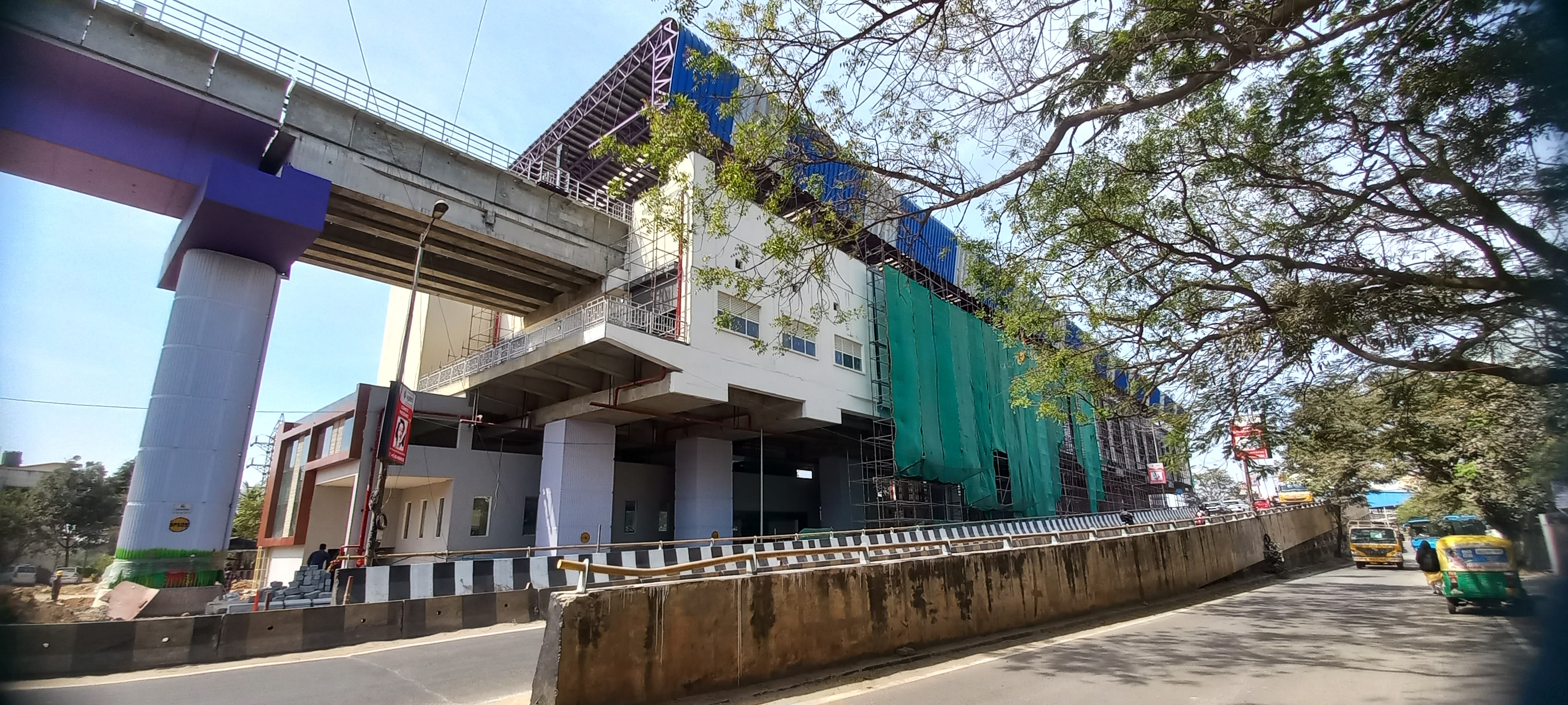
Under Construction as of February 2023

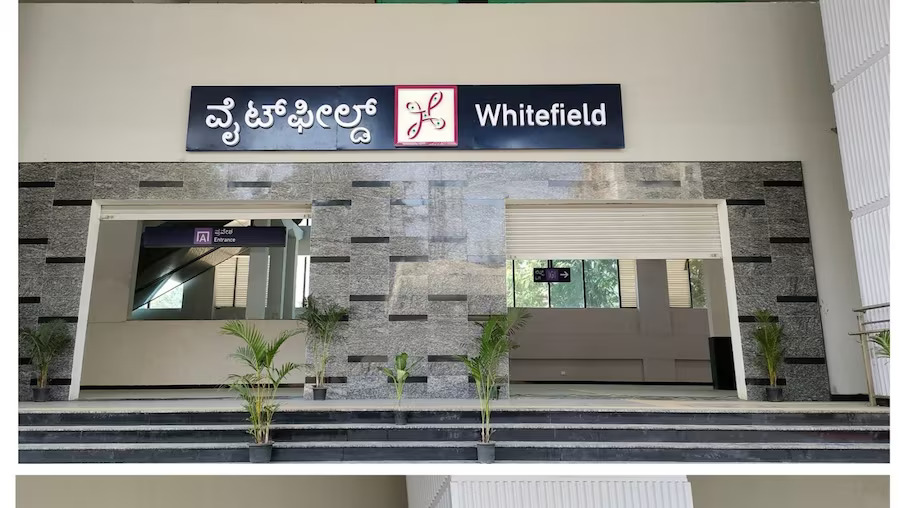
Front Entrance as of March 2023

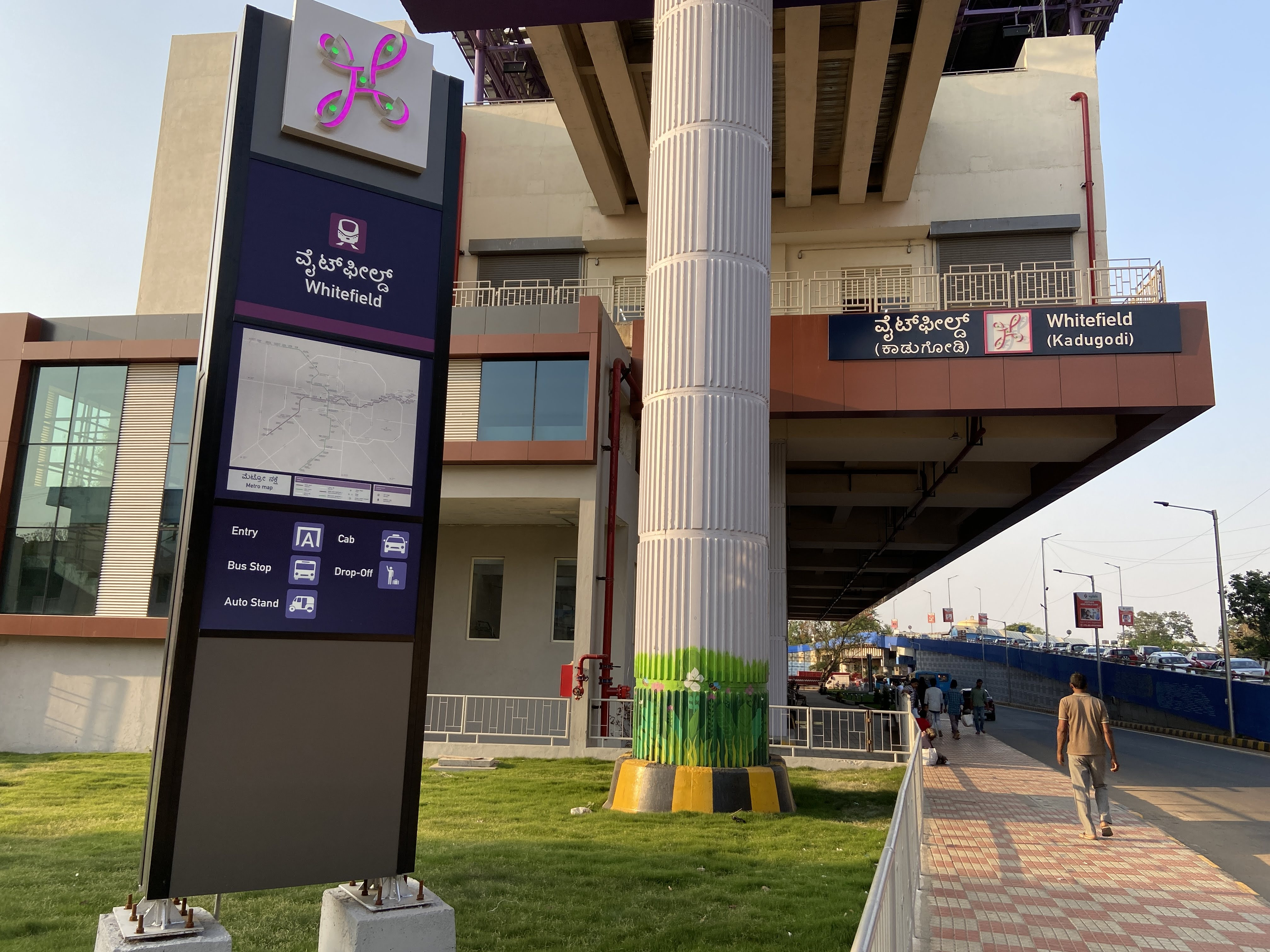
Station Entrance as of April 2023

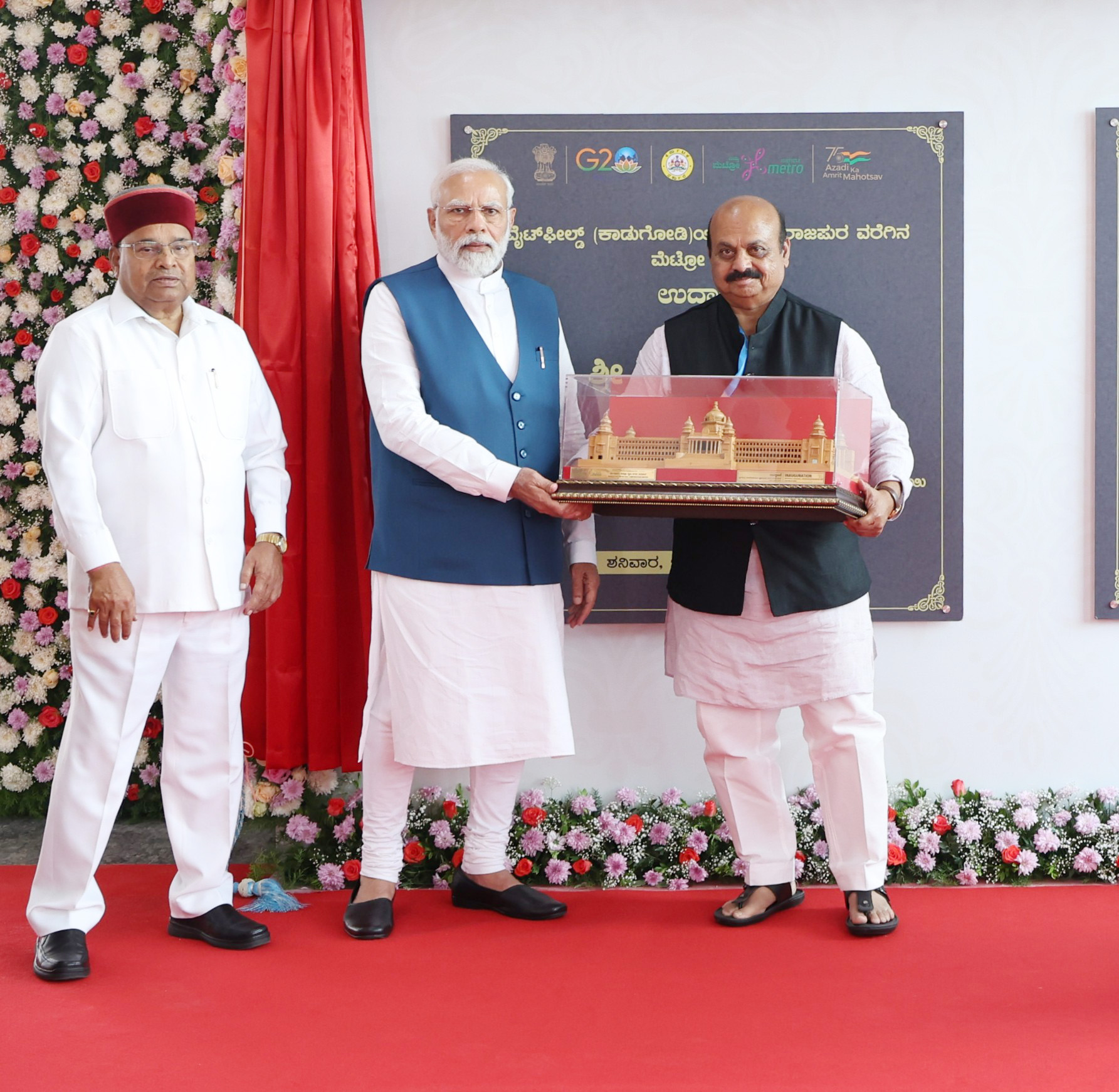
Inauguration of this metro station with PM Narendra Modi along with former Karnataka Chief Minister Shri. Basavaraj Bommai

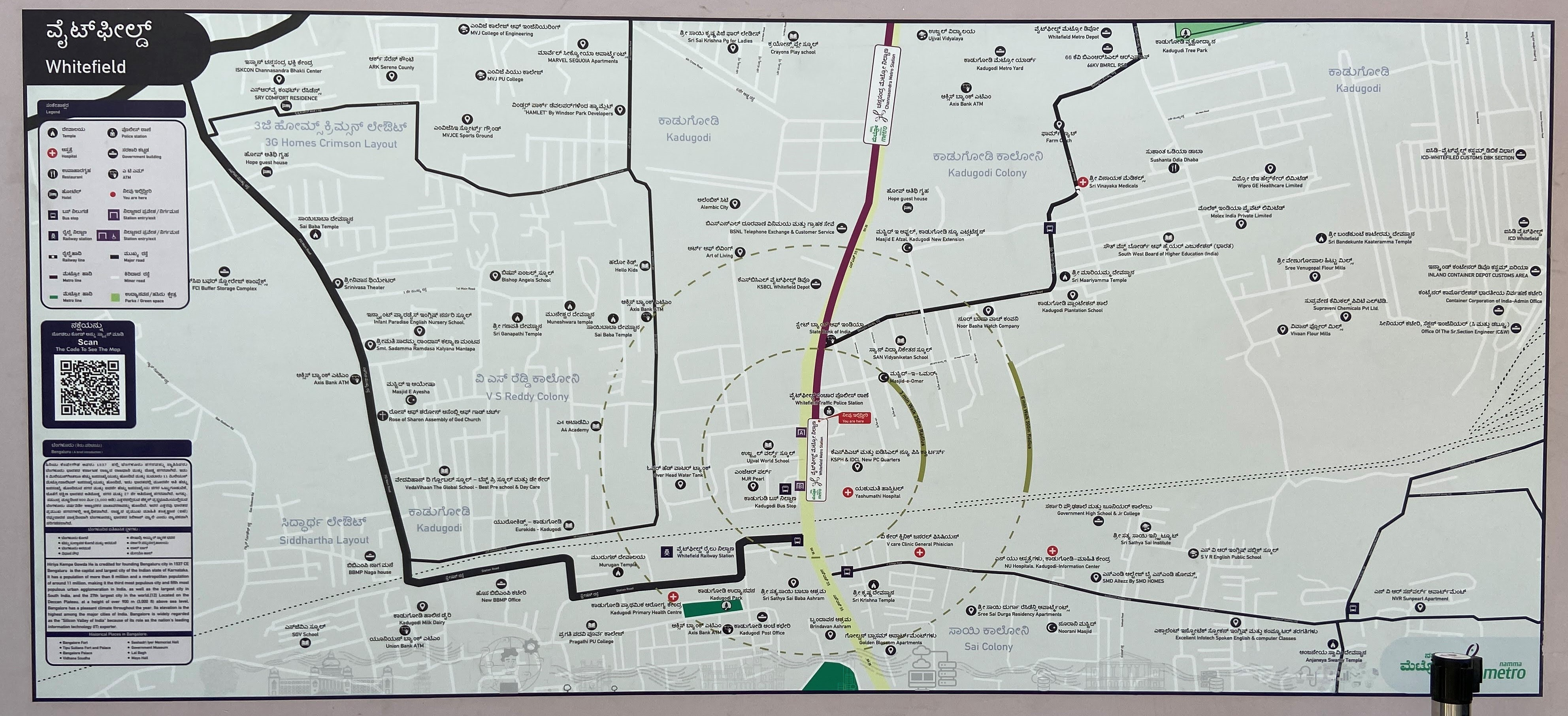
Whitefield (Kadugodi)'s metro map

== Entry/Exit ==
There are 2 Entry/Exit points - A and B. Commuters can use either of the points for their travel.

- Entry/Exit point A - Towards Whitefield Traffic Police Station side
- Entry/Exit point B - Towards Whitefield Railway Station side

== See also ==
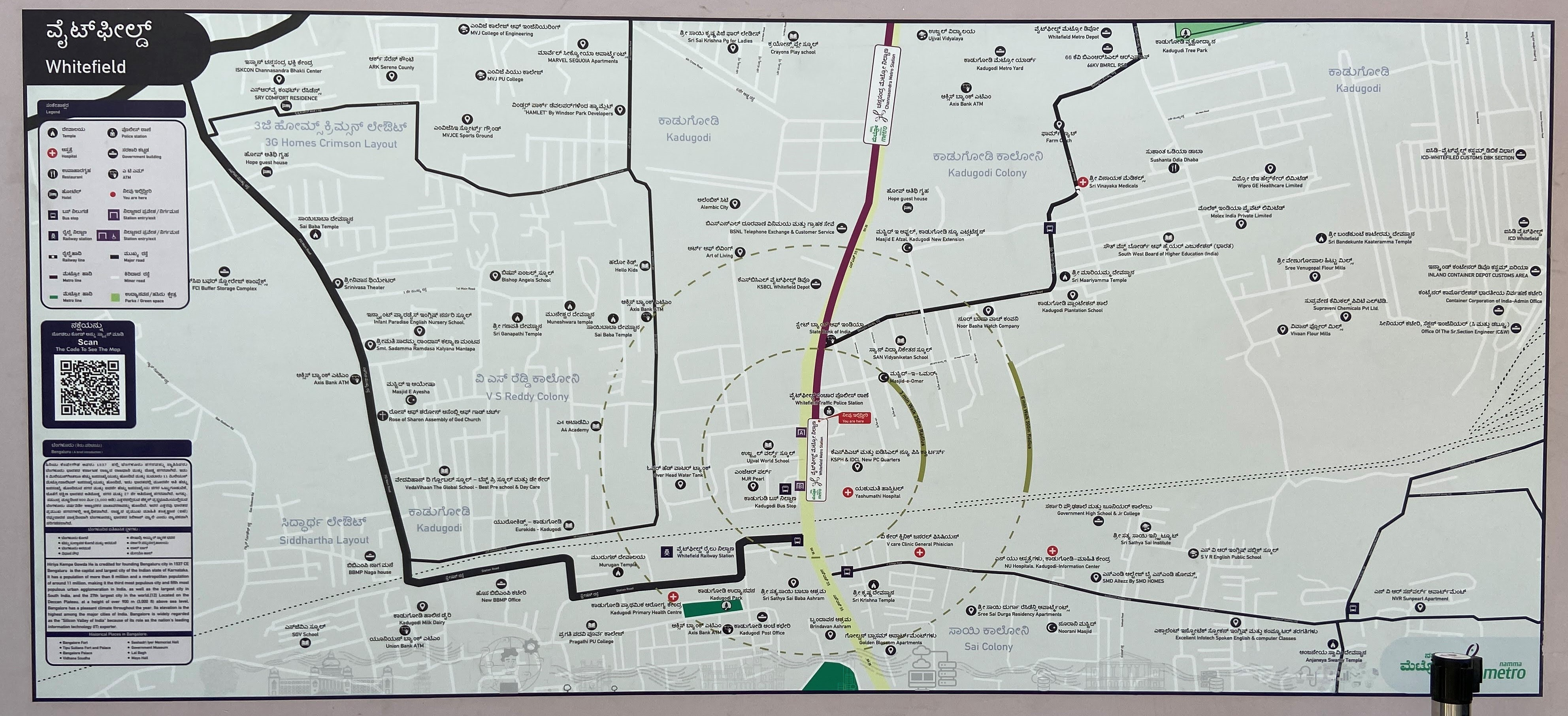
A map shown at the station

- Whitefield, Bengaluru
- Bangalore
- Whitefield railway station
- List of Namma Metro stations
- Transport in Karnataka
- List of metro systems
- List of rapid transit systems in India
- Bangalore Metropolitan Transport Corporation
