= Magadi Road metro station =

Namma Metro's Purple Line metro station

Magadi Road
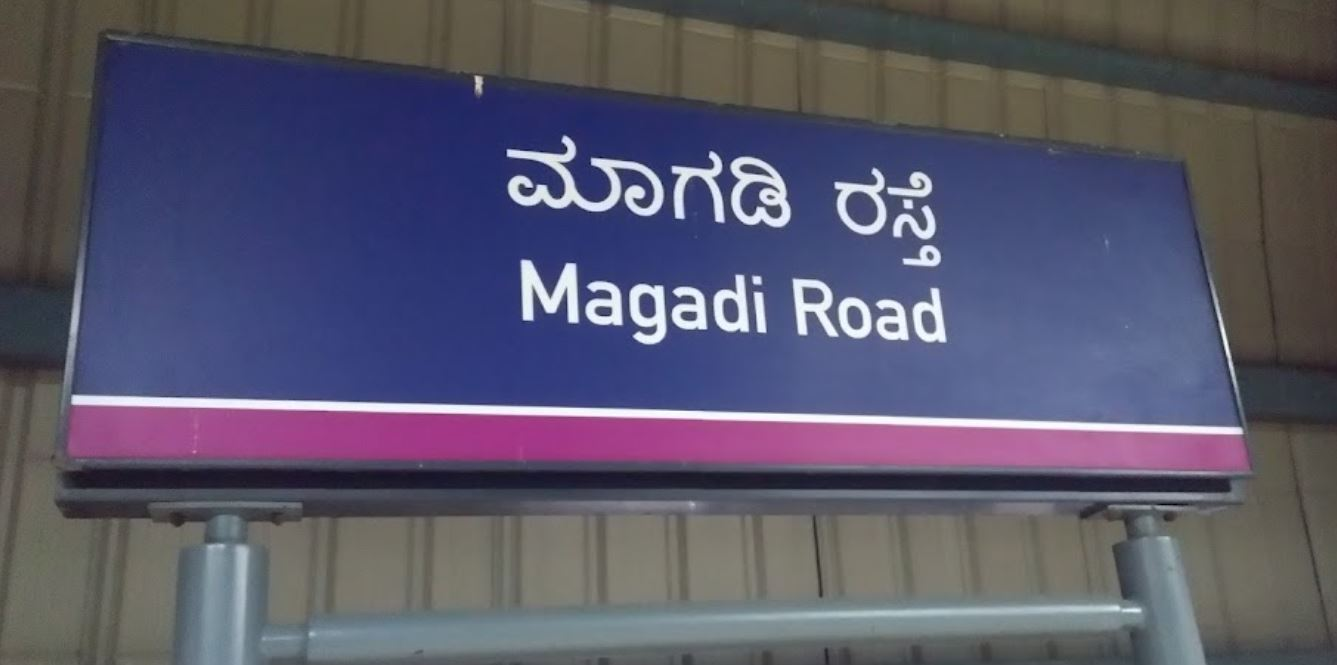

General information
- Location: Magadi Main Rd, Lakshminarayanapuram, Binnipete, Bengaluru, Karnataka 560023
- Coordinates: 12.975578°N 77.555430°E
- System: Namma Metro station
- Owner: Bangalore Metro Rail Corporation Ltd (BMRCL)
- Operator: Namma Metro
- Line: Purple Line
- Platforms: Side platform Platform-1 → Whitefield (Kadugodi); Platform-2 → Challaghatta
- Tracks: 2

Construction
- Structure type: Elevated, double track
- Platform levels: 2
- Parking: Available
- Accessible: Yes
- Architect: Punj Lloyd - Sembawang Infrastructure (India) JV

Other information
- Status: Staffed
- Station code: MIRD

History
- Opened: 16 November 2015; 10 years ago
- Electrified: 750 V DC third rail

Services
Preceding station	Namma Metro	Following station
Krantivira Sangolli Rayanna Railway Station towards Whitefield (Kadugodi)	Purple Line	Hosahalli towards Challaghatta
Route map
Location

Magadi Road is an elevated metro station on the east–west corridor of the Purple Line of Namma Metro serving the Magadi Road in Bengaluru, India. The station was constructed by Punj Lloyd and was opened to the public on 16 November 2015.

The parking lot at the Magadi Road metro station can accommodate around 200 motorcycles and 50 cars.

== Station layout ==
G	Street level	Exit/entrance
L1	Mezzanine	Fare control, station agent, Metro Card vending machines, crossover
L2	Side platform | Doors will open on the left
L2	Platform 1 Eastbound	Towards → Whitefield (Kadugodi); NextsStation: Krantivira Sangolli Rayanna Railway Station
L2	Platform 2 Westbound	Towards ← Challaghatta; Next station: Hosahalli; Change at the next station for Grey Line **
L2	Side platform | Doors will open on the left
L2

== See also ==
- Bangalore
- List of Namma Metro stations
- Transport in Karnataka
- List of metro systems
- List of rapid transit systems in India
- Bangalore Metropolitan Transport Corporation
