= Surekha (artist) =

Indian artist

- Education: Visva Bharati University, Ken School of Arts, Bangalore University
- Known for: Video and photo works
- Website: http://surekhainfo.com/

Surekha is a contemporary Indian video artist whose works showcase themes including identity and feminism/ecology. She has been a full-time artist since 1996 and her video works have been shown at galleries outside India since 2001. Her works are known for the mix of video and physical presence, highlighting inherent experiences. Surekha has been exploring the possibilities of the video form, negotiating the public and private, locating the body as a site of contestation and appropriation. She uses photography and video to archive, document and perform. She has shown her works both in India and many international shows. Surekha, a visual artist from India, is exploring artistic forms through installations, video & photography since last two decades. Her works investigates how visuality can engage with gender/ ecology/socio-political aesthetics, negotiating public and private spaces. Surekha has been to international art residencies and also taught in art universities. She has presented talks at Malmo University, Tate Modern etc., She has been involved in visual art collectives like BAR1, Khoj and was a founder curator of Rangoli Metro Art Center, Bangalore. Surekha lives and works in Bangalore.

== Education ==
She studied visual arts at Ken School of arts (1985–90) and then post graduation from Vishwabharati University (1990–92). She also completed her graduation in sciences from Bangalore University. In 2006, she completed a film course from No.w.here London.

== Exhibits ==
Her work has been shown in Indian and International galleries and museums like, Kunstraum Kreuzberg (Berlin), Sanjose Museum & Ulrich museum (USA), Kunsthaus (Langenthal), Museum Guimet (Paris), EAWAG (Zurich), National Gallery of modern art (Bangalore), Devi Art Foundation & Kiran Nadar Museum of Art (New Delhi), Chemould Prescott Road & Lakeeren art gallery (Mumbai), Kastrupgard Samlingen (Copenhagen), Herbert J.Foundation (Cornell University), Centro Cultural Banco do Brasil, (Rio de Janeiro), Fondacio La Caixa (Barcelona), Bucharest Biennale, Pleasure Dome (Toronto), Loveland Museum (USA), New media festival (Dhaka), Alharama Art Center, Lahore / Karachi, Minneapolis art Institute/Newark Museum, Ivam Museum (Spain), Videonnale-Malmo Museum (Stockholm), Haus der Kulturen der Welt (Berlin), Jerusalem Show- Al'mammal Foundation, Asia Triennale (Manchester), Royal academy (London), Fluss (Austria), Kunst Museum (Bern), Ecole Beaux Arts (Paris), Dakshina Chitra & Boros Museum (Sweden), Ethnographic Museum (Geneva), Aboa Arsanova/Lappenrenta Museum (Finland) and IMA (Brisbane). She has had many solo shows in Bangalore since 1996 (at Venkatappa Art Gallery, Gallery Ske, Sistas art gallery, Karnataka Chitrakala Parishat, Vishweshwariah science Museum, Samuha collective etc.,).

== Art workshops and presentations ==
- 1993-2020 visiting artist at : Mallya Aditi International school, Srishti School of Art & Design and Technology, Ken School of Arts, Chitrakala Parishat, Bangalore, CAVA, Mysore, Viswabharathi university (Kalabhavan).* 2005 Malmo Art Academy, Lund art school, Boros textile school, Sweden
- 2003 Boros Textile School, Voland Art Academy, Sweden
- 2008 Cava Mysore/ Kalabhavan, Santiniketan, MSU, Baroda
- 2010 SN school, Hyderabad University.

== As Jury for Project-grants ==
Jury and project advisor for Bosch art grants (Bangalore)- 2009,2010 Pro helvetia Fellowships (New Delhi) – 2009/2010/2012 Goethe Institute (Residency projects)- 2009/2010
