= Krantivira Sangolli Rayanna Railway Station metro station =

Namma Metro's Purple Line metro station

Krantivira Sangolli Rayanna Railway Station
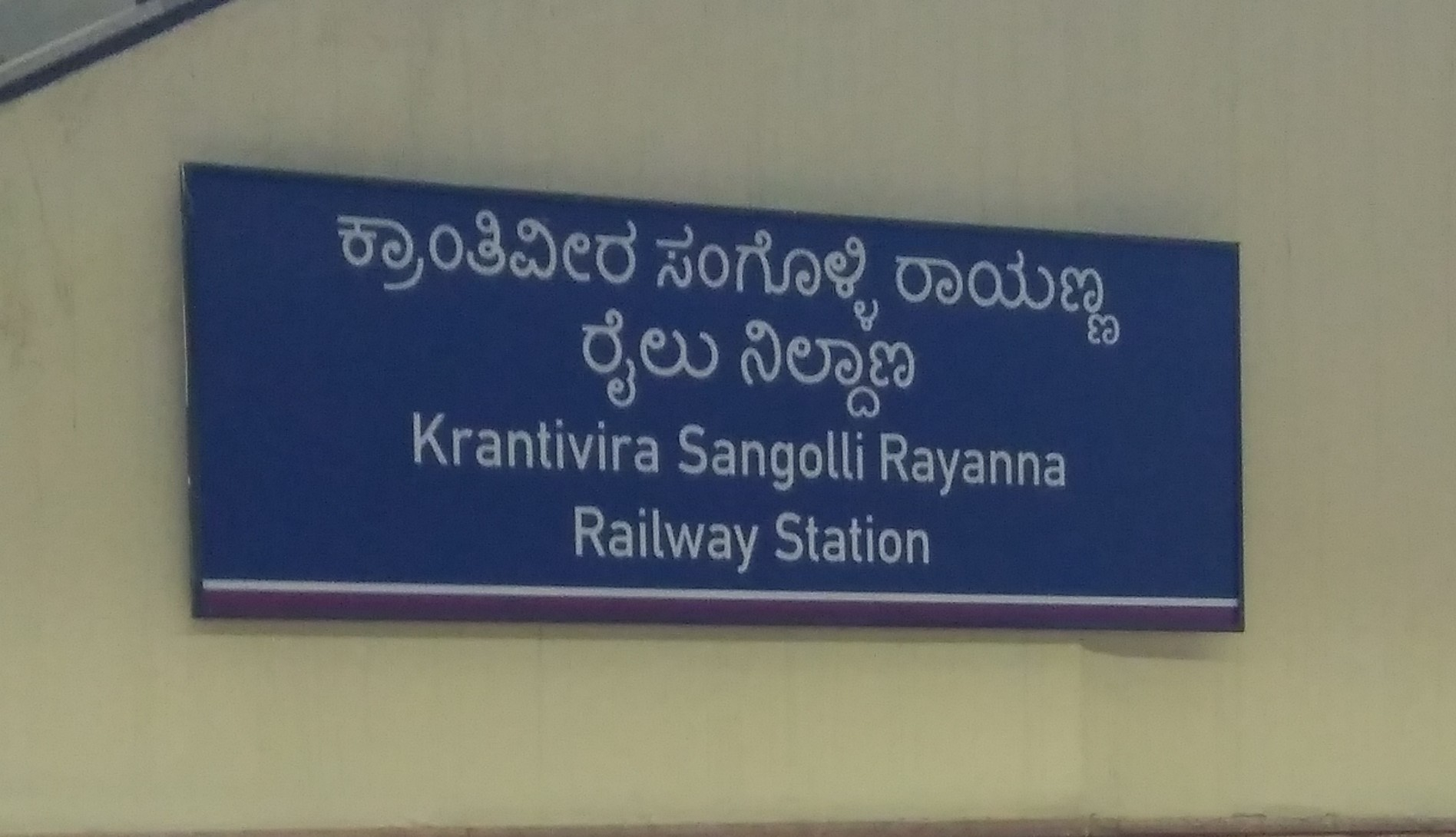

General information
- Other names: City Railway Station
- Location: Tank Bund Road Subhash Nagar, Sevashrama, Bengaluru, Karnataka 560023
- Coordinates: 12.975814°N 77.565708°E
- System: Namma Metro
- Owner: Bangalore Metro Rail Corporation Ltd (BMRCL)
- Operator: Namma Metro
- Line: Purple Line
- Platforms: Island platform Platform-1 → Whitefield (Kadugodi); Platform-2 → Challaghatta
- Tracks: 2
- Connections: KSR Bengaluru

Construction
- Structure type: Underground, Double track
- Platform levels: 2
- Accessible: Yes
- Architect: CEC - Soma - CICI JV

Other information
- Status: Staffed
- Station code: SRCS

History
- Opened: 30 April 2016; 10 years ago
- Electrified: 750 V DC third rail

Services
Preceding station	Namma Metro	Following station
Nadaprabhu Kempegowda station, Majestic towards Whitefield (Kadugodi)	Purple Line	Magadi Road towards Challaghatta
Route map
Location

Krantivira Sangolli Rayanna Railway Station (formerly known as City Railway Station) is an underground metro station on the East-West corridor of the Purple Line of Namma Metro which serves the Subhash Nagar area, Sevashrama area in Bangalore, India. It was opened to the public on 30 April 2016.

A foot overbridge connecting the metro station with platform 10 of the Bangalore City railway station was opened on 18 February 2019. The BMRC reported that monthly ridership at the metro station was 175,000 passengers per day prior to opening the bridge, and increased to 250,000 two months after its opening.

== Station layout ==
G	Street Level	Exit/ Entrance
M	Mezzanine	Fare control, station agent, Ticket/token, shops
P	Platform 1 Eastbound	Towards → Whitefield (Kadugodi); Next Station: Nadaprabhu Kempegowda Stn., Majestic; Change at the next station for Green Line
P	Island platform | Doors will open on the right
P	Platform 2 Westbound	Towards ← Challaghatta; Next Station: Magadi Road

== Entry/Exits ==
There are 5 Entry/Exit points – A, B, C, D and E. Commuters can use either of the points for their travel.

- Entry/Exit point A: Towards KSR Bengaluru Railway Stn.
- Entry/Exit point B: Towards Shree Angala Parameshwari Temple side
- Entry/Exit point C: Towards Tank Bund Road side
- Entry/Exit point D: Towards Tank Bund Road side with wheelchair accessibility
- Entry/Exit point E: Towards Minerva Mills Road side

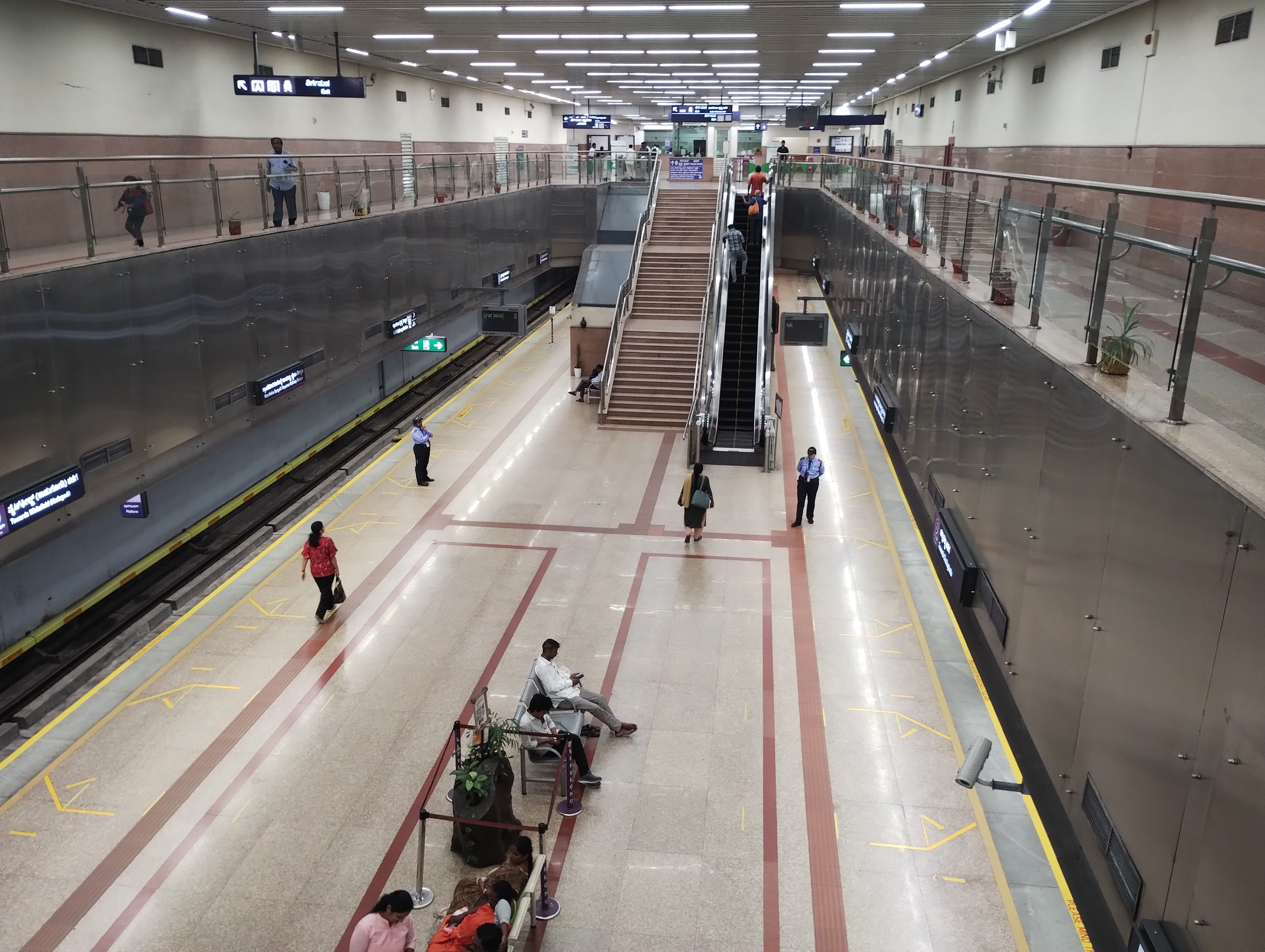
Inside station

== See also ==
- Bangalore
- List of Namma Metro stations
- Transport in Karnataka
- List of metro systems
- List of rapid transit systems in India
- Bangalore Metropolitan Transport Corporation
