= Hosahalli metro station =

Namma Metro's Purple Line metro station

Sri Balagangadharanatha Swamiji Stn., Hosahalli
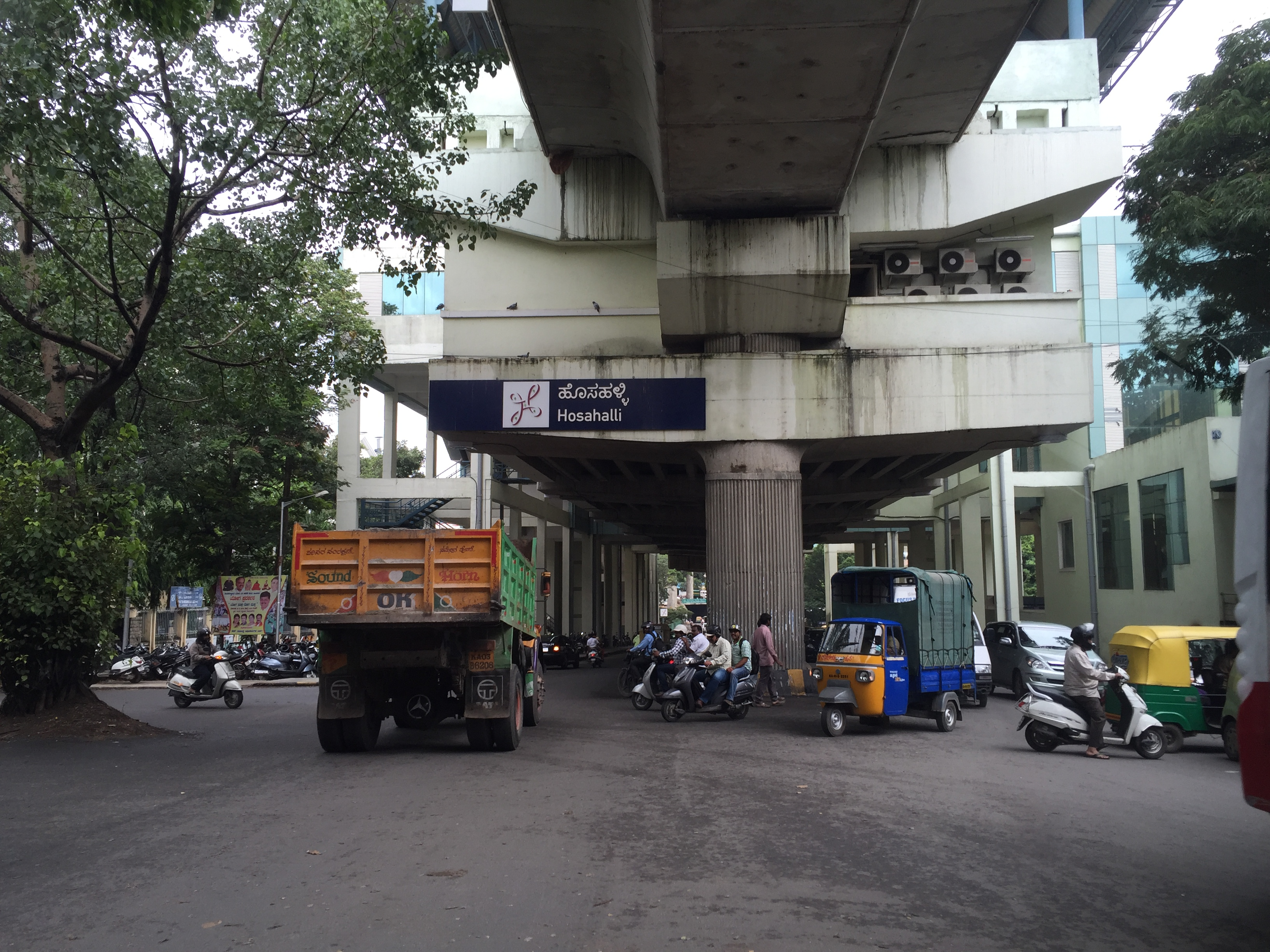
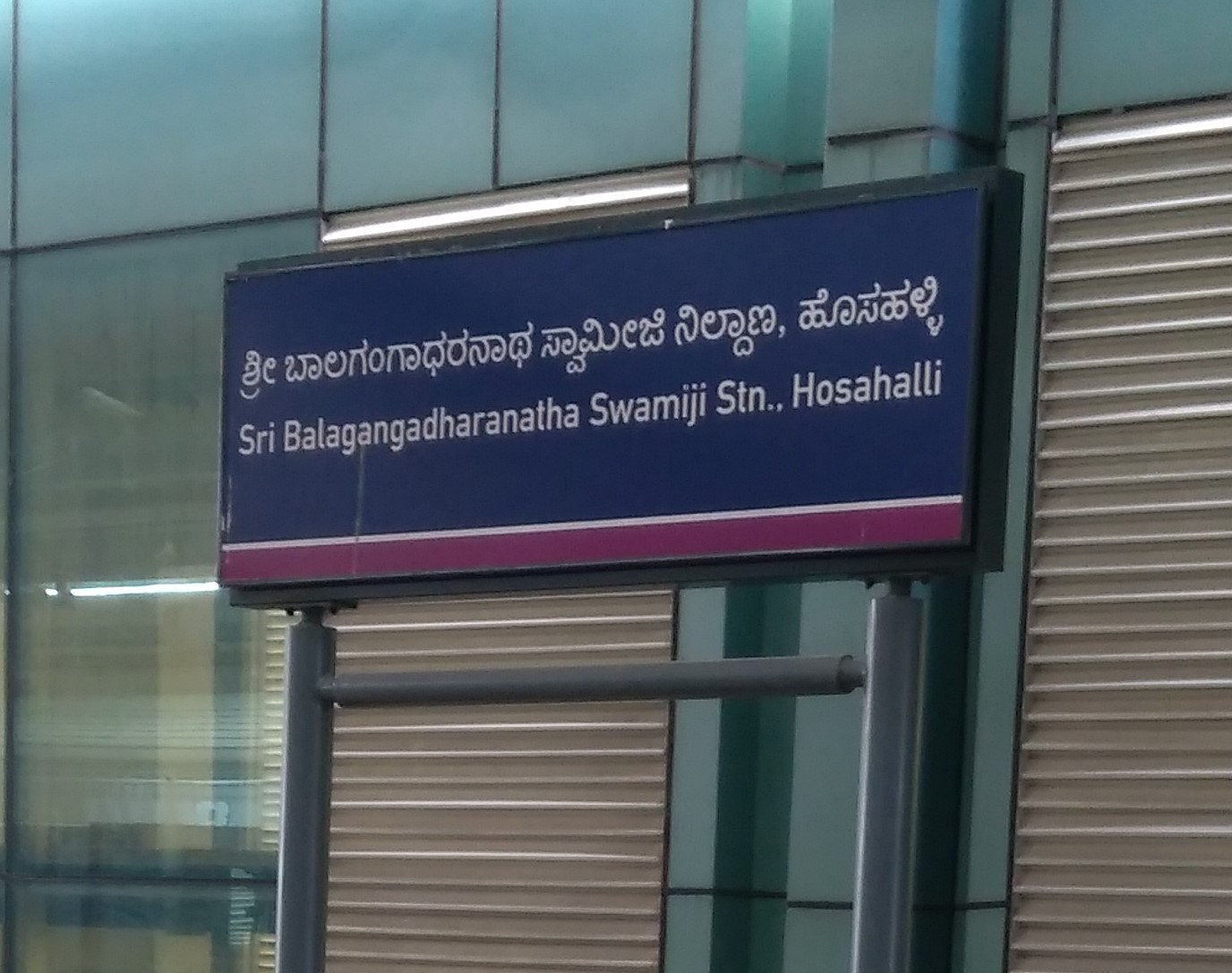

General information
- Other names: Hosahalli
- Location: Chord Rd, Stage 1, Vijaya Nagar, Bengaluru, Karnataka 560040
- Coordinates: 12.974178°N 77.545538°E
- System: Namma Metro station
- Owner: Bangalore Metro Rail Corporation Ltd (BMRCL)
- Operator: Namma Metro
- Lines: Purple Line; Grey Line; Inner Ring Line
- Platforms: Side platform Platform-1 → Whitefield (Kadugodi); Platform-2 → Challaghatta
- Tracks: 2

Construction
- Structure type: Elevated, Double track
- Platform levels: 2
- Parking: Available
- Accessible: Yes
- Architect: Ahluwalia Contracts (India)

Other information
- Status: Staffed
- Station code: HSLI

History
- Opened: 16 November 2015; 10 years ago
- Electrified: 750 V DC third rail

Services
Preceding station	Namma Metro	Following station
Magadi Road towards Whitefield (Kadugodi)	Purple Line	Vijayanagar towards Challaghatta
Terminus	Grey Line (Future service)	KHB Colony towards Kadabagere
Route map
Location

Sri Balagangadharanatha Swamiji Stn., Hosahalli (formerly known as Hosahalli) is an elevated metro station on the East-West corridor of the Purple Line of Namma Metro serving the Hosahalli area in Bengaluru, India. It was opened to the public on 16 November 2015 as a part of the Magadi Road-Mysuru Road section of the Purple Line.

This station is named after Indian religious leader, Balagangadharanatha Swamiji.

== History ==
Upon inauguration, the station was simply named Hosahalli. Proposals to have the station renamed after Balagangadharanatha Swamiji were first brought up by several political leaders at the inauguration ceremony of the Magadi Road-Mysuru Road stretch of the Purple Line, within which the station is. It was implied that these proposals were politically motivated and attempts to please their respective constituencies. This was (at the time) a deviation from BMRCL's norm of not naming railway stations after notable persons.

As of today, the station has officially been renamed, and is referred to as "Sri Balagangadharanatha Natha Swamiji Station – Hosahalli" in announcements on the Namma Metro.

== Station layout ==
Purple Line Station Layout

G	Street level	Exit/Entrance
L1	Mezzanine	Fare control, station agent, Metro Card vending machines, crossover
L2	Side platform | Doors will open on the left
L2	Platform 1 Eastbound	Towards → Whitefield (Kadugodi); Next Station: Magadi Road
L2	Platform 2 Westbound	Towards ← Challaghatta; Next Station: Vijayanagar
L2	Side platform | Doors will open on the left
L2

Grey Line Station Layout (TBC)

G	Street level	Exit/Entrance
L1	Mezzanine	Fare control, station agent, Metro Card vending machines, crossover
L2	Side platform | Doors will open on the left
L2	Platform # Eastbound	Towards → Train Terminates Here
L2	Platform # Westbound	Towards ← Kadabagere; Next Station: KHB Colony
L2	Side platform | Doors will open on the left
L2

== Entry/Exits ==
There are 3 Entry/Exit points – A, B and C. Commuters can use either of the points for their travel.

- Entry/Exit point A: Towards BSNL Telephone exchange – has stairs as well as escalator service to provide entry or exit to/from the metro station
- Entry/Exit point B: Elevator (located towards Shri Adichunchanagiri Mutt)
- Entry/Exit point C: Towards Shri Adichunchanagiri Mutt – has stairs to provide entry or exit to/from the metro station (Escalator is in construction)

== See also ==
- Bangalore
- List of Namma Metro stations
- Transport in Karnataka
- List of metro systems
- List of rapid transit systems in India
- Bangalore Metropolitan Transport Corporation
