= Inner Ring Line =

Proposed loop metro line in Karnataka, India

Inner Ring line

Overview
- Other names: Line 9; Yeshwanthapura–Mahalakshmi Line
- Native name: Oḷauṅgura mārga
- Status: Proposed
- Owner: Bangalore Metro Rail Corporation Limited (BMRCL)
- Locale: Bengaluru, Karnataka, India
- Termini: Yeshwanthpur (proposed)
- Connecting lines: Operational (3) Yellow Line Purple Line Green Line; Upcoming (3): Pink Line Red Line Grey Line
- Stations: 24(proposed)
- Website: bmrc.co.in

Service
- Type: Metro
- System: Namma Metro
- Depot: (TBC)

History
- Planned opening: 2042; 16 years' time (TBC)

Technical
- Line length: 34 km (21 mi)
- Number of tracks: 2
- Character: (TBC)
- Track gauge: 1,435 mm (4 ft 8 1/2 in) standard gauge
- Electrification: 750 V DC third rail

The Inner Ring Line is a proposed metro rail line for the Namma Metro's network in the city of Bengaluru, Karnataka, India by Indian Institute of Science (IISc), featuring 24 stations and Six to Eight interchanges with other lines. A study by the institute has projected that the loop line would increase the overall ridership of Namma Metro by 77 percent. The report also concluded that the emissions of carbon dioxide and particulate matter would reduce by 14.8 percent and 18.6 percent respectively, by 2031.

IISc has recommended the loop line as a better alternative for Government of Karnataka's proposal of city wide tunnel roads. The institute stated that the tunnel roads would lead to an increase in the number of vehicles on the road, as opposed to the line, which would lead to a decrease almost twice the calculated increase with the tunnel roads.

As of February 2026, further deliberation on the proposal has been put on hold, as the state government has instead prioritised feasibility studies for Metro extensions to Bengaluru's satellite towns such as Tumakuru, Devanahalli, Attibele, Hoskote, and Jigani.

== Funding ==
The proposal to build Metro along the city's Inner Ring Road was mentioned in the government's Comprehensive Mobility Plan (CMP) 2031. It is unclear if the 34-km underground line, which is expected to cost about ₹ 10,000 crore, will be a part of Namma Metro’s upcoming Phase III or phase IV expansions. The Bangalore Metro Rail Corporation Ltd (BMRCL) is yet to finalise the new lines including the Inner Ring Line.

== Stations ==
Inner Ring Line
#	Station name		Connections	Station layout (TBC)
#	English	Kannada	Connections	Station layout (TBC)
1	Yeshwanthpura TTMC	ಯಶವಂತಪುರ ಟಿಟಿಎಂಸಿ	Green LineYeshwanthpura	Underground
2	Indian Institute Of Science	ಭಾರತೀಯ ವಿಜ್ಞಾನ ಸಂಸ್ಥೆ		Underground
3	Mekhri Circle	ಮೇಖ್ರಿ ವೃತ್ತ	Red Line	Underground
4	Jaya Chamarajendra Nagara	ಜಯ ಚಾಮರಾಜೇಂದ್ರ ನಗರ		Underground
5	Jayamahal	ಜಯಮಹಾಲ್		Underground
6	Cantonment Railway Station	ದಂಡು ರೈಲ್ವೇ ನಿಲ್ದಾಣ	Pink Line	Underground
7	Halasuru lake	ಹಲಸೂರು ಕೆರೆ		Underground
8	Trinity	ಟ್ರಿನಿಟಿ	Purple Line	Underground
9	Airforce Command Hospital	ಕಮಾಂಡ್ ಆಸ್ಪತ್ರೆ		Underground
10	Domaluru	ದೊಮ್ಮಲೂರು		Underground
11	Embassy Golf Link	ಎಮ್ಬಿಸಿ ಗರ್ಲ್ಸ್ ಲಿಂಕ್		Underground
12	Srinivagilu	ಶ್ರೀನಿವಾಗಿಲು		Underground
13	St John's Hospital	ಸೇಂಟ್ ಜಾನ್ಸ್ ಆಸ್ಪತ್ರೆ		Underground
14	Sudduguntepalya	ಸುದ್ದುಗುಂಟೆಪಾಳ್ಯ		Underground
15	Dairy Circle	ಡೈರಿ ಸರ್ಕಲ್	Pink Line; Red Line	Underground
16	Wilson Garden	ವಿಲ್ಸನ್ ಗಾರ್ಡನ್		Underground
17	Lalbagh	ಲಾಲ್ಬಾಗ್	Green Line	Underground
18	Basavanagudi	ಬಸವನಗುಡಿ		Underground
19	Gavipura	ಗವಿಪುರ		Underground
20	Azad Nagara (sirsi circle)	ಅಜಾದ್ ನಗರ (ಸಿರ್ಸಿ ವೃತ)		Underground
21	Hosahalli (Toll Gate)	ಹೊಸಹಳ್ಳಿ (ಟೋಲ್ ಗೇಟ್)	Purple Line; Grey Line	Underground
22	Dhobi ghat	ದೋಭಿ ಘಾಟ್		Underground
23	Mahalakshmi	ಮಹಾಲಕ್ಷ್ಮಿ	Green Line	Underground

== See also ==
- Namma Metro
  - Purple Line
  - Green Line
  - Yellow Line
  - Pink Line
  - Blue Line
  - Orange Line
  - Red Line
  - Grey Line
  - List of Namma Metro Stations
- Rapid transit in India
- List of metro systems
