= Rangoli Metro Art Center =

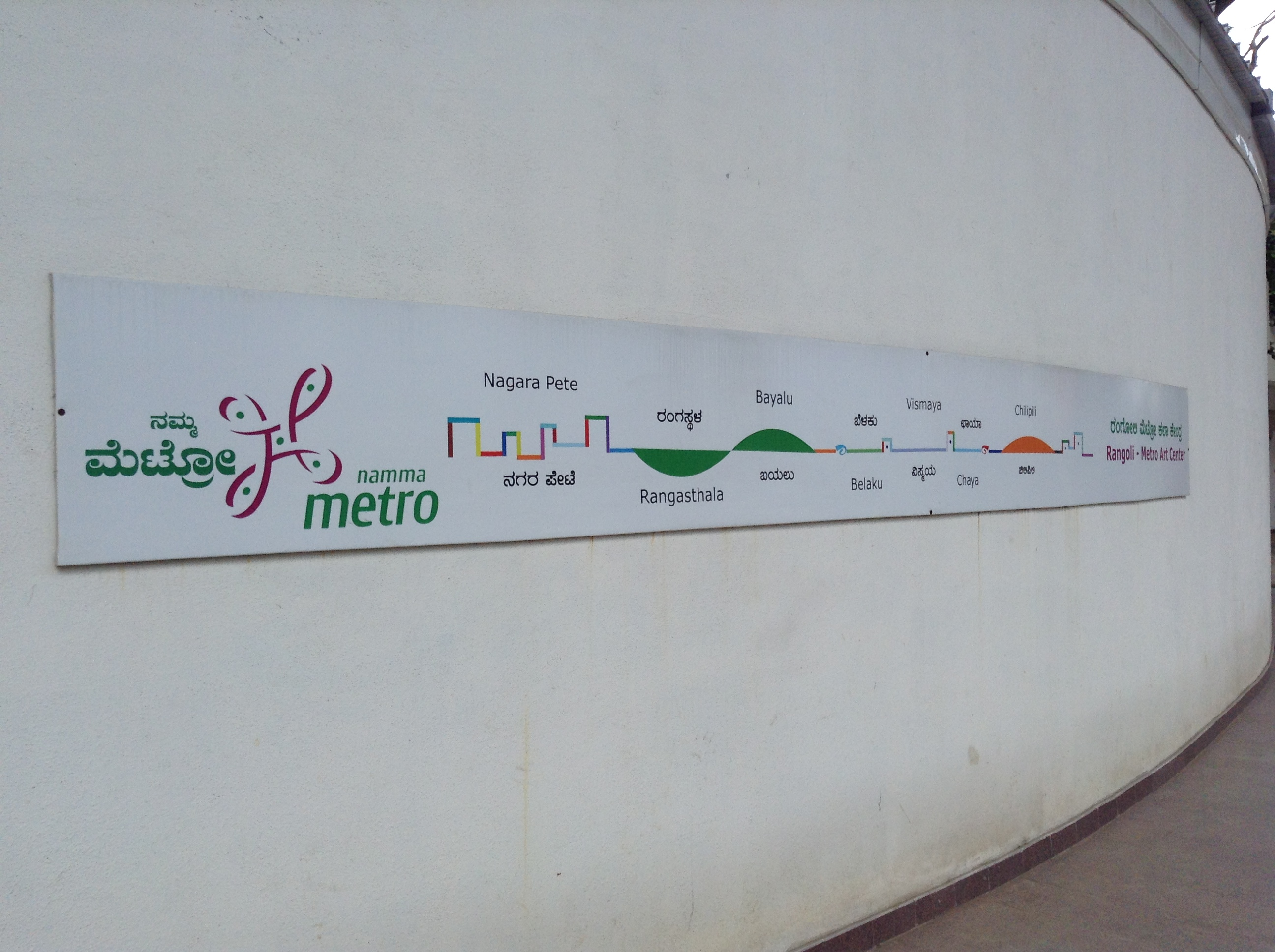
Rangoli - Namma Metro Art Center

Rangoli Metro Art Center was developed by the Bangalore Metro Rail Corporation Ltd (BMRCL), after the construction work of the MG Road metro station, Bangalore was completed. It was inaugurated on 6 May 2013.

BMRCL redesigned the walkway with bougainvilleas. The walkway was available for the public before the construction of the metrorail station. The center includes an art galleries, an auditorium, a play area for kids, and a walkway.

== Facilities ==
- Nagara Pete (Market)
- Art Galleries: Vismaya, Chaya and Belaku
- Children's interactive play area: Chilipili
- Upper Walk-way: Hoovina Haadi
- Open area for outdoor performances: Bayalu
- Friendship Point
- Info Wall: Bangalore over the years
- Green Initiation
- Outdoor spaces for artistic activities, such as workshops and demonstrations

== Events ==
In May 2017, a tribute to artist Yusuf Arakkal was showcased.

On 1 May 2022, the Embassy of France organised Bonjour India's City for All? aimed at making public spaces in Indian cities more accessible to women and transgender people by engaging the masses in public art projects.
