= Grey Line (Namma Metro) =

Proposed line of Bengaluru's Namma Metro

Overview
- Other names: Line 7; Hosahalli-Kadabagere Line
- Native name: Būdi mārga Hosahaḷḷi-Kaḍabagere mārga
- Status: Approved
- Owner: Bangalore Metro Rail Corporation Limited (BMRCL)
- Locale: Bangalore, Karnataka, India
- Termini: Hosahalli; Kadabagere
- Connecting lines: Operational (1): Purple Line; Upcoming (1): Orange Line; Planned (1): Inner Ring Line
- Stations: 11(Elevated)
- Website: bmrc.co.in

Service
- Type: Metro
- System: Namma Metro
- Depot(s): Magadi Road (TBD)

History
- Planned opening: 2029; 3 years' time

Technical
- Line length: 12.5 km (7.8 mi)
- Number of tracks: 2
- Character: Elevated (TBD)
- Track gauge: 1,435 mm (4 ft 8 1/2 in) standard gauge
- Electrification: 750 V DC third rail

The Grey Line is an upcoming metro line serving Bangalore as part of the Namma Metro network in the city. This metro line will serve the industrial areas, manufacturing units, Engineering and Textile Manufacturing Units on Magadi Road, providing connectivity to the Western part of the city, (Note: Outer Ring Road West Side, Magadi Road with its neighbouring areas) thereby improving last-mile connectivity to commercial centres, industrial hubs, educational institutions, and healthcare facilities. The line was approved by the Union Cabinet on August 17, 2024 and is scheduled for completion in 2029.

== History ==
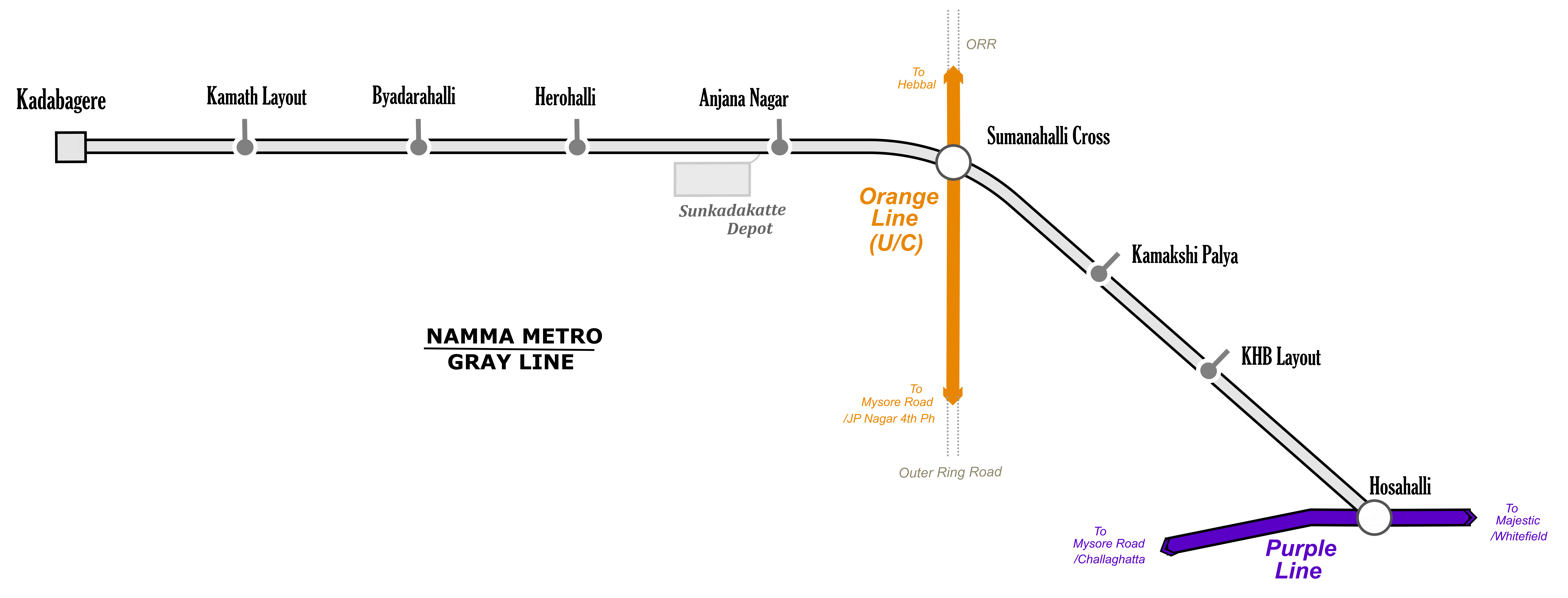

BMRCL began planning Namma Metro Phase-III in 2013, shortly after announcing Phase-II, which included the Yellow Line and Pink Line. Later in June 2013 BMRCL partnered with RITES Limited to conduct a pre-feasibility study for each proposed corridor

By 2016, BMRCL submitted its Phase-III proposal to the Ministry of Urban Development, which initially spanned 150.94 km. However, following the feasibility the network size was reduced to 102 km, with the remaining corridors being planned for Light Rail. The proposed lines were

- Nagavara - Kempegowda International Airport
- Carmelaram - Yelahanka
- Marathahalli - Hosakerehalli
- Silkboard - Hebbal via KR Puram.

However, in 2017 the Karnataka Government announced that the Silkboard - Hebbal line and the Nagavara - Airport line were merged to create the Blue Line and fast tracked to Phase 2A and Phase 2B.

In 2018 the Karnataka Government officially confirmed Phase III with several modifications. Multiple new lines were introduced while some others were dropped. Following another round of modifications in 2020, only two lines were finalized to be part of Phase-III

- Magadi Road Toll Gate to Kadabagere line
- Kempapura to JP Nagara 4th Phase

In July 2020, RITES Limited was assigned to prepare the Detailed Project Report (DPR) work for Phase-III. RITES submitted the DPR to the State Government who approved it in November 2022. The final approval was received from the Central Government in August 2024 paving the way for BMRCL to start land acquisition and tender notification.

== Tendering ==
As of January 2025 BMRCL has issued tenders for Geotechnical Investigations and Detailed Design Consultancy (DDC). Once the Geotechnical Investigations are finished and finalized with the DDC BMRCL plans to release the Civil Work Tender.

Pre-Construction Activity
Tendering	Section	Activity	Successful Bid /Cost	Contractor	Award
Phase-3/GTI/2024/109/ Pkg-4	Hosahalli to Kadabagere	Geotechnical Investigation	₹1.54 crore (US$180,000)	SECON	23 Jul 2024
Phase-3/DDC3/RFP/2024/117	Hosahalli Station to Kadabagere	Detailed Design Consultant	Bidding Underway		
EPDD-5	Traction and Power Supply	Detailed Design Consultant	Bidding Underway		
Total			₹1.54 crore (US$180,000)		

== Stations ==
=== Interchanges ===
Passenger interchange facilities, connecting to other metro and railway lines, are proposed at the following stations:

- Hosahalli (Connects to the Purple Line, which runs from Whitefield (Kadugodi) to Challaghatta)
- Sumanahalli Cross (Connects to the Orange Line, which runs from JP Nagar 4th Phase to Kempapura)

Grey Line
#	Station Name		Connections	Station Layout
#	English	Kannada	Connections	Station Layout
1	Sri Balagangadharanatha Swamiji Station, Hosahalli	ಶ್ರೀ ಬಾಲಗಂಗಾಧರನಾಥ ಸ್ವಾಮೀಜಿ ನಿಲ್ದಾಣ, ಹೊಸಹಳ್ಳಿ	Purple Line	Elevated
2	KHB Colony	ಕೆ.ಎಚ್.ಬಿ. ಕಾಲೋನಿ		Elevated
3	Kamakshi Palya	ಕಾಮಾಕ್ಷಿಪಾಳ್ಯ		Elevated
4	Sumanahalli Cross	ಸುಮನಹಳ್ಳಿ ಕ್ರಾಸ್	Orange Line (Approved)	Elevated
5	Sunkadakatte	ಸುಂಕದಕಟ್ಟೆ		Elevated
6	Herohalli	ಹೇರೋಹಳ್ಳಿ		Elevated
7	Byadarahalli	ಬ್ಯಾಡರಹಳ್ಳಿ		Elevated
8	Kamath Layout	ಅರಣ್ಯ ದ್ವಾರ		Elevated
9	Kadabagere	ಕಡಬಗೆರೆ		Elevated

== See also ==
- Namma Metro
  - Purple Line
  - Green Line
  - Yellow Line
  - Pink Line
  - Blue Line
  - Orange Line
  - Red Line
  - Inner Ring Line
  - List of Namma Metro Stations
- Rapid transit in India
- List of metro systems
