= Namma Metro =

Rapid transit system in Bengaluru, Karnataka, India

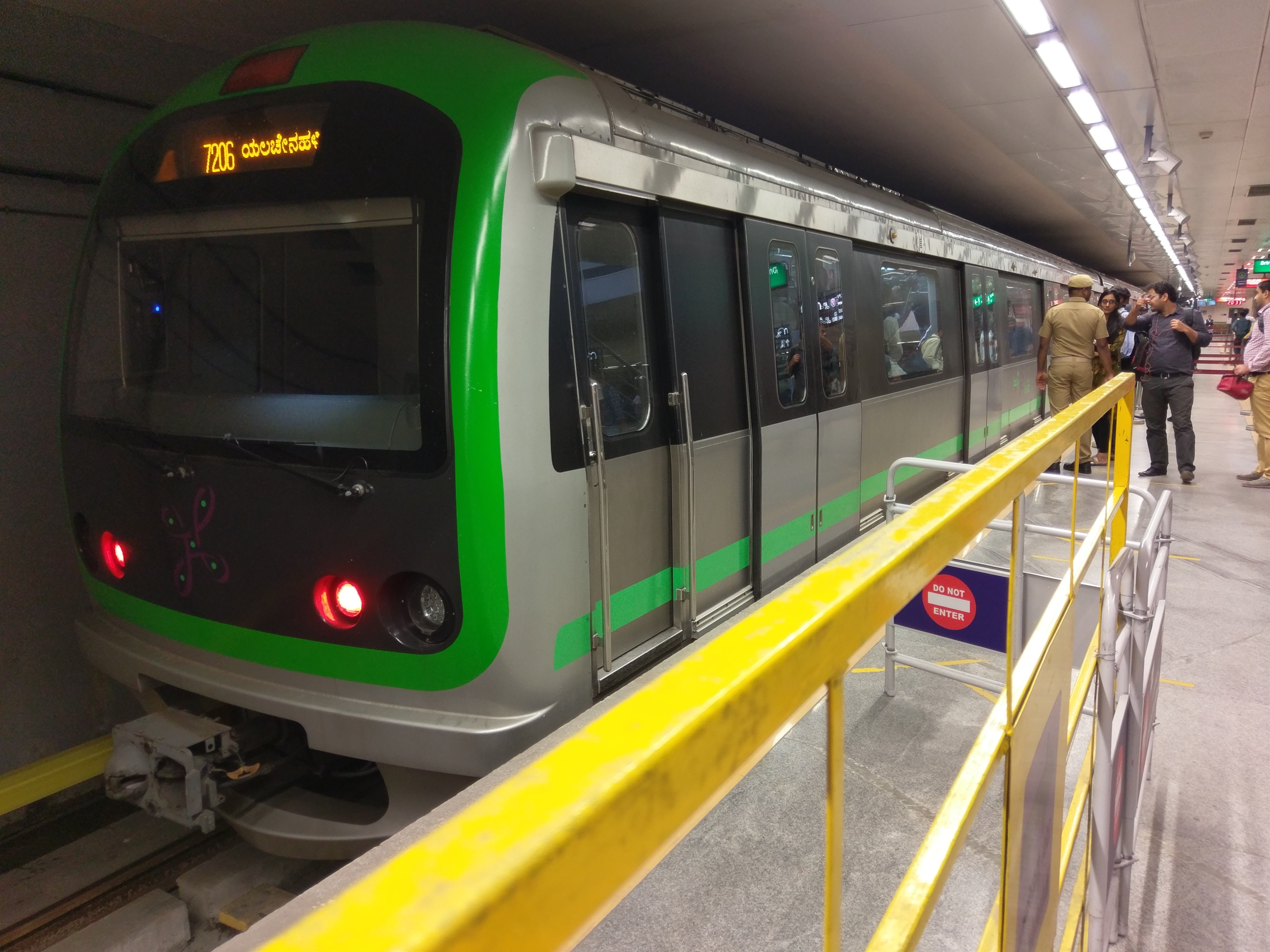
- BEML - Hyundai Rotem rake on Green Line

Overview
- Owner: Bangalore Metro Rail Corporation Limited (BMRCL)
- Locale: Bengaluru
- Transit type: Rapid transit
- Number of lines: 4
- Line number: 1 2 3 4
- Number of stations: 88 (Note: Interchange stations are counted only once. There are a total of 3 interchange stations. If added number goes up to 91 stations)
- Daily ridership: Average: 9,16,461 (April 2026); Highest: 11,19,815 (10 August 2026)
- Annual ridership: 232.8 million (2023)
- Chief executive: Jaffer P.C (MD)
- Headquarters: BMTC Central Office, Sarige Sadana, Kengal Hanumanthaiah Road, Bengaluru, Karnataka, India
- Website: bmrc.co.in

Operation
- Began operation: 20 October 2011; 15 years ago
- Number of vehicles: 90
- Train length: 6 coaches

Technical
- System length: Operational 103.6 km (64.4 mi) ; Under construction (Ph 2, 2A, 2B) 72.95 km (45.33 mi)
- No. of tracks: 2
- Track gauge: 1,435 mm (4 ft 8 1/2 in) standard gauge
- Electrification: 750 V DC third rail
- Average speed: 35 km/h (22 mph)
- Top speed: 80 km/h (50 mph)
Operational network map as of November 2026

Namma Metro (transl. Our Metro), also known as Bengaluru Metro, is a rapid transit system serving the city of Bengaluru, the capital city of the state of Karnataka, India. It is the second-largest metro network in India with an operational length of 103.6 km (64.4 mi), behind Delhi Metro as of November 2026. Namma Metro has a mix of underground, at grade, and elevated stations. Out of the 91 operational metro stations of Namma Metro as of November 2026, there are 83 elevated stations, 7 underground stations and 1 at-grade station. The system runs on standard-gauge tracks and is powered by 750V direct current through third rail.

Upon its inauguration in 2011, it became the first metro system in South India, and subsequently in 2016, the first underground metro in South India as well.

Bangalore Metro Rail Corporation Limited (BMRCL), a joint venture of the Government of India and the State Government of Karnataka, is the agency for building, operating and expanding the Namma Metro network. Services operate daily between 05:00 and 00:00 running with a headway varying between 3–15 minutes. The trains initially began with three coaches but later, all rakes were converted to six coaches as ridership increased.

Map of Bengaluru's urban rail network with operational, under-construction and planned lines of Namma Metro and Bengaluru Suburban Railway.

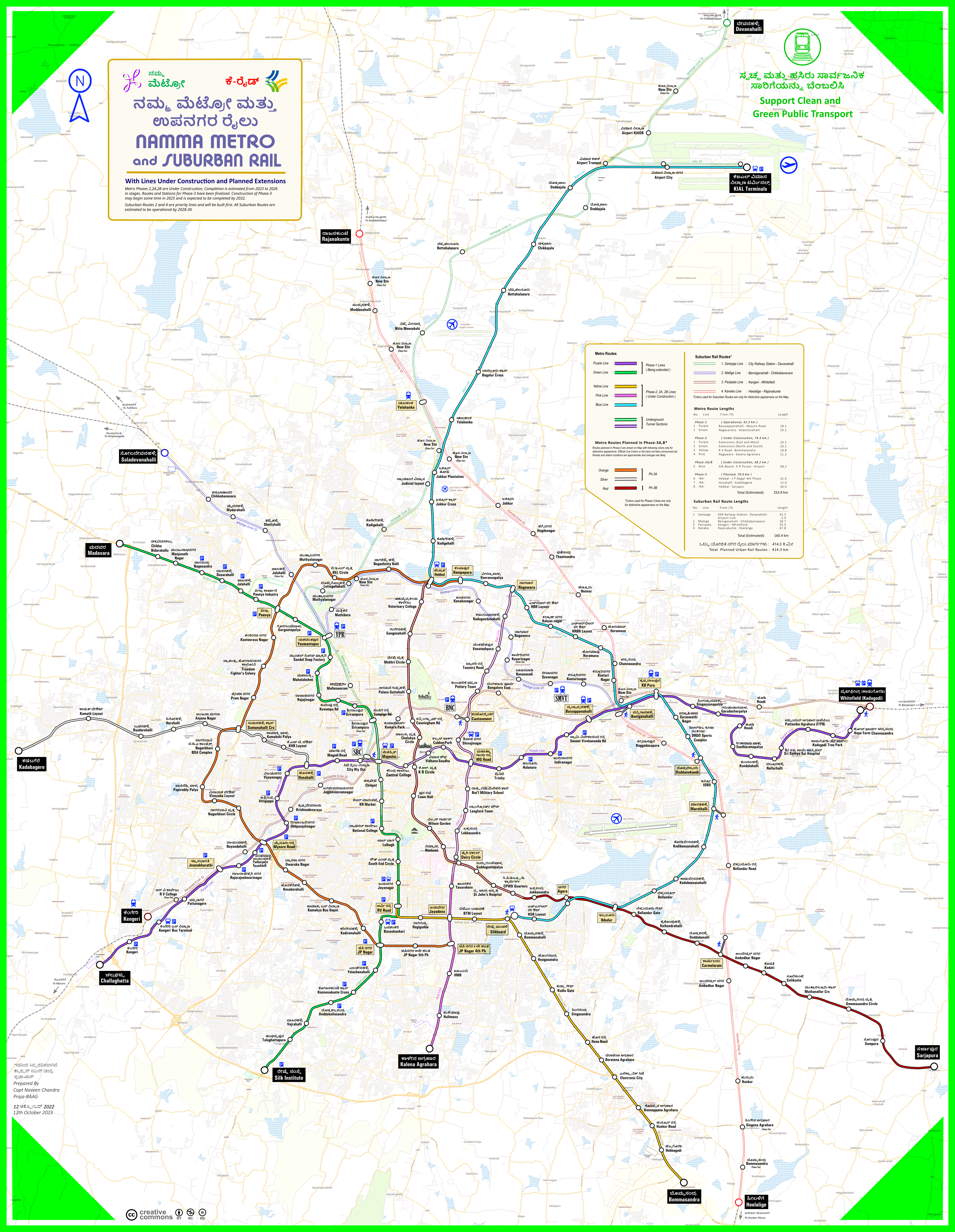
Geographic map

Transit diagram

== Background ==
The State Town Planning Department had recommended looking into a mass rapid transit project, i.e. a metro for Bengaluru city, back in 1977. A high-level Committee had also agreed that a metro study was warranted and a team from Southern Railway (SR) was commissioned to do this in 1981. The Southern Railway team recommended a two-corridor metro, 80 km (49.7 mi) in length, in addition to commuter rail lines and a circular railway.

In 1993, the State of Karnataka established another committee to look into mass rapid transit. This committee had again recommended the same metro project put forward by SR in 1983 along with the same circular railway. The state then created Bangalore Mass Rapid Transit Ltd (BMRTL) in 1994, with terms of reference to seek a public/private partnership for a mass rapid transit project. The government immediately introduced a special city cess dedicated to the anticipated mass rapid transit project. BMRTL commissioned a feasibility study which came up with an elevated, LRT-based, 300 km (186.4 mi) long network on six routes. A private consortium led by United Breweries Group undertook further development of the project on BOT basis. However, the project hadn't taken off.

Later in 2003, the Government of Karnataka commissioned the Delhi Metro Rail Corporation (DMRC), which had successfully developed the Delhi Metro, to carry out a detailed preparation study for a metro in Bengaluru, to be done emulating the technical and financial aspects of the approach used in Delhi. The study recommended a 2-line cross shaped metro, 60 km (37.3 mi) and 50 km (31.1 mi) in length respectively. The intersection of the cross was to be at the Central Railway Station in Bengaluru, completely underground. The economic rate-of-return was forecast at 22.3%. The financial forecast assumes a government subsidy for interest payments and some depreciation, i.e. fare revenue would cover somewhat more than direct operating costs. The Government accepted this option. BMRTL ceased to exist and was replaced by Bengaluru Metro Rail Corporation Ltd (BMRCL).

DMRC prepared and submitted the detailed project for the first phase of Namma Metro in May 2003. The DPR was for a 2-lined cross shaped 33 km (20.51 mi) network with 32 stations for Phase-1 of the project, using standard gauge. The project was approved by the Union Cabinet on 25 April 2006.

== Construction ==
Timeline of Namma Metro's expansion.

=== Phase 1 ===
The foundation stone for construction of Phase-1 was laid by then Prime Minister Dr. Manmohan Singh on 24 June 2006. Navayuga Engineering Company Limited was awarded the first contract to construct Reach-1 of the east–west corridor (named Purple Line later) in 2006. Civil construction on the first section (Reach-1) of the Purple Line between Baiyyappanahalli and Mahatma Gandhi Road, commenced on 15 April 2007.

Detailed Project Reports (DPR) for a northern extension (from Yeshwanthapura to Nagasandra) and a southern extension (from Rashtreeya Vidyalaya Road to Yelachenahalli) of north–south corridor (named Green Line later) was submitted in October 2007 and June 2008 respectively. With these extensions, the total route length for Phase 1 became 42.3 km (26.28 mi). The objective was to connect the metro to the Outer Ring Road at northern and southern ends, and also cover the industrial areas of Peenya in the north-west, thereby providing better connectivity and increasing ridership. In October 2008, the Government of Karnataka approved this extension, which would cost an additional ₹1,763 crore (US$250 million).

==== Underground section ====
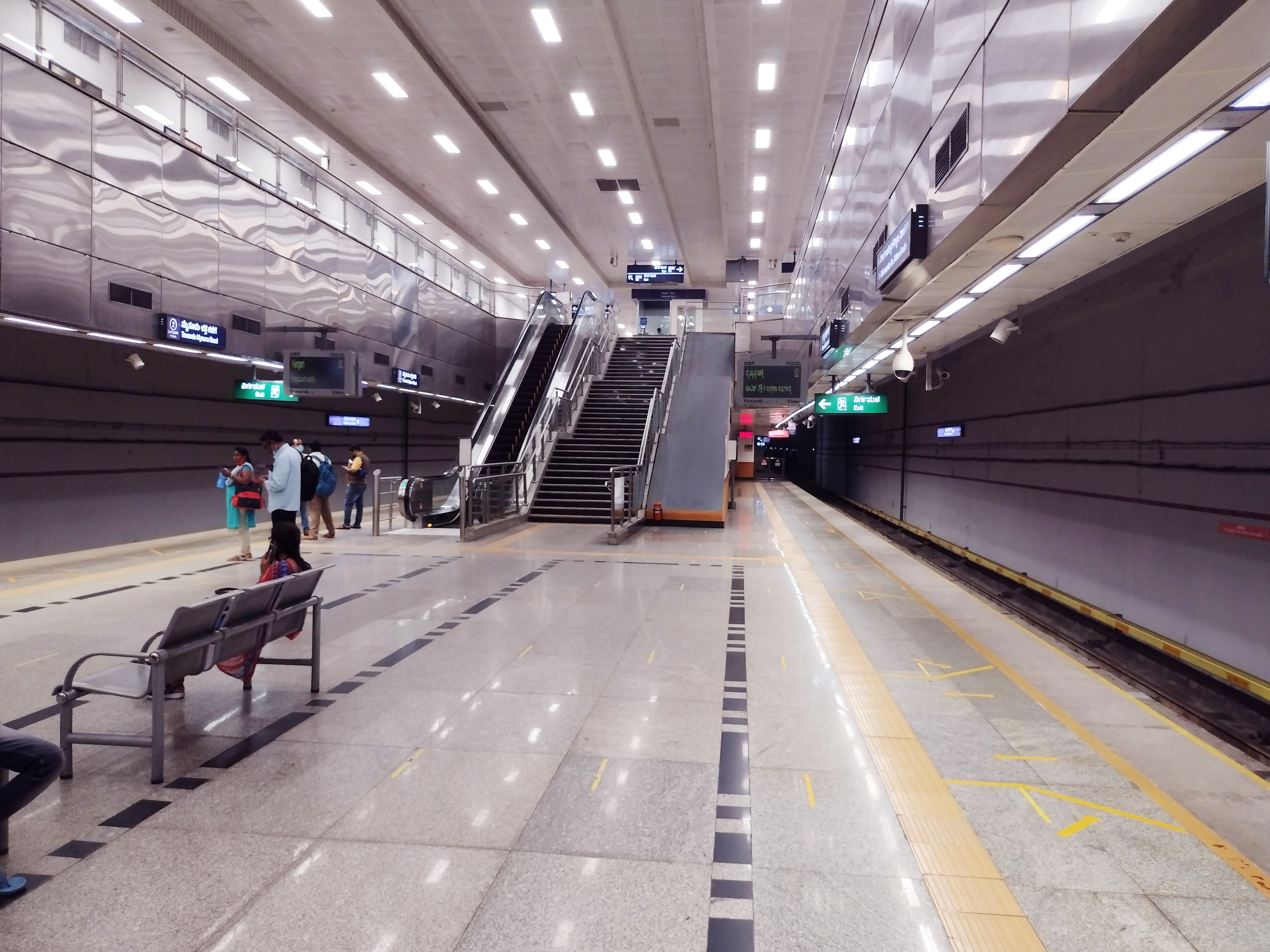
Dr. B. R. Ambedkar metro station, Vidhana Soudha

Both lines in Phase-1 have tunnel sections in the city center, which are also the first metro tunnels built in South India. Construction of underground sections in Phase-1 commenced in late 2012. The delay was due to cancellation of the initial tenders called in early 2008 as the entire DPR had to be revised and bids received were too high. A second round of tendering was done in late 2009 with the gigantic Majestic inter-change station as a separate package. Bids were awarded for the tunnel sections in 2011 and construction began in 2012.

The tunnels bored with tunnel boring machines (TBMs), located approximately 60 feet (18.3 m) below ground level, have a diameter of 5.5 metres (18 ft 1 in) and are 5 metres (16 ft 5 in) apart. The TBMs were nicknamed Helen, Margarita, Kaveri, Krishna and Godavari.

Tunnel boring of underground section UG1 (on east–west corridor) was completed on 17 March 2014. Track works and 3rd rail electrification works were completed on the 4.8 km (2.98 mi) east–west tunnel of the Purple line between Cubbon Park and Magadi Road and Bangalore Metro Rail Corporation Ltd (BMRCL) began trials on 23 November 2015. The entire stretch of the Purple Line was opened on 29 April 2016.

Tunnel boring of underground section UG2 (on north–south corridor) was completed on 23 September 2016. The tunneling faced a major delay when the cutter head of TBM Godavari was broken and spares had to be awaited. Trial runs on the 4.0 km (2.49 mi) east–west tunnel of the Green line between Sampige Road and National College were commenced on 31 March 2017. The entire stretch of Green Line was opened on 19 June 2017, thus completing Phase-1 of the project.

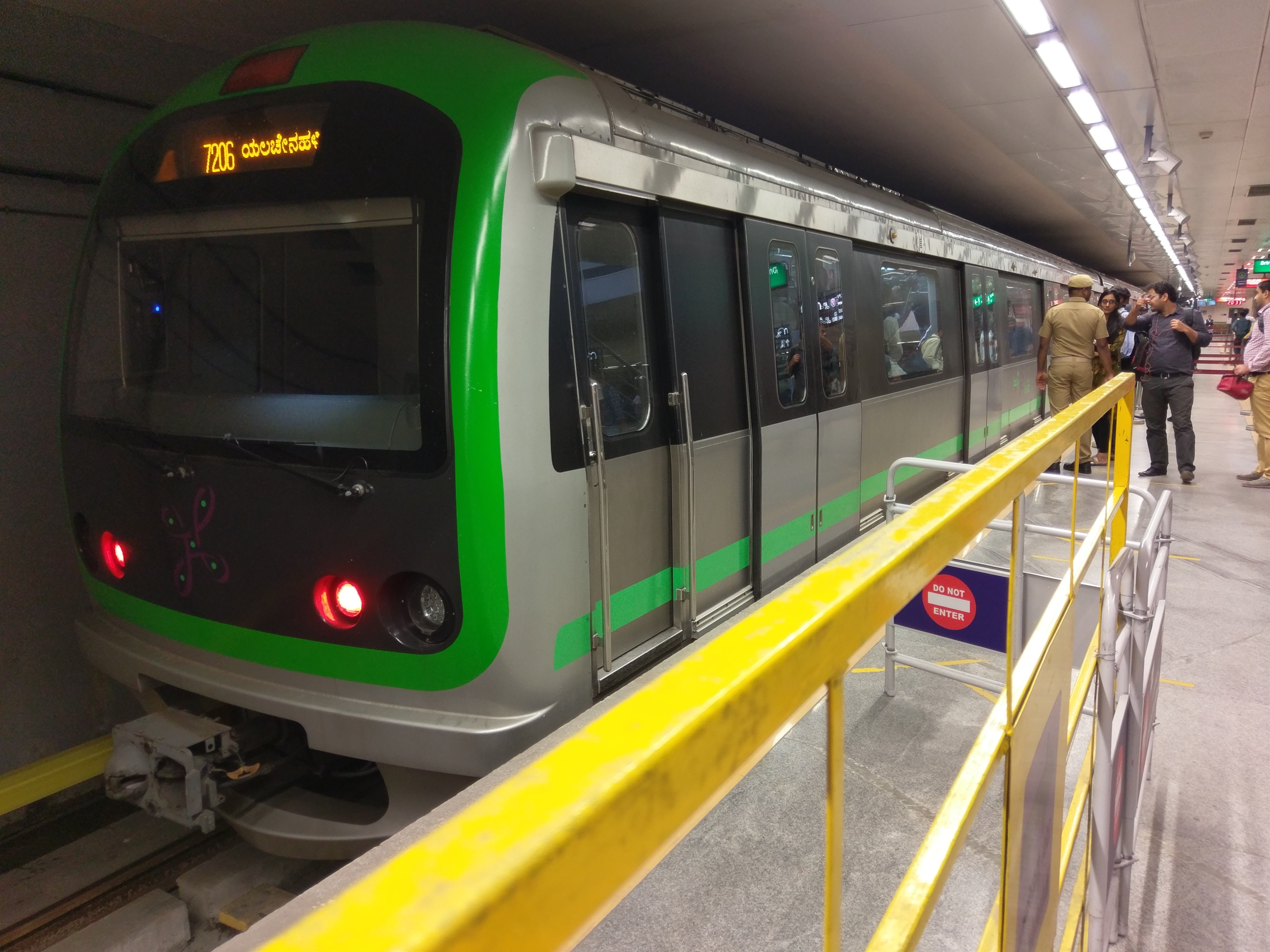
Namma Metro Green Line train

==== Opening ====
After missing deadlines, Namma Metro's first section (Reach-1) finally opened to the public on 20 October 2011. There was an overwhelming response by the public at commencement of operations. As per BMRCL sources, within the first 3 days of operations 169,019 people rode the metro. At the end of the 4th day, about 200,000 passengers had already commuted on Namma Metro. Namma Metro's first 12-day cumulative revenue was ₹1 crore (US$100,000).

The northern section of Green Line (Reach 3, 3A, 3B) was initially scheduled to be opened by the end of 2012. However, it was delayed and finally opened on 1 March 2014. BMRCL MD Pradeep Singh Kharola stated that about 25,000 passengers travelled on the line on the opening day. In the first month of operations, 7.62 lakh people used the line, at an average of 24,605 daily, generating revenues of ₹1.5 crore (US$210,000).

The first underground section (on the Purple line) commenced operations on 30 April 2016, providing connectivity between the east and west of the city. Subsequently, the second underground section, along with southern reaches (viz. Reach 4, 4A) was opened on 18 June 2017.

Once the east and west reaches were inter-connected with opening of the underground section of the purple line, ridership surged significantly. After the north–south underground section was opened (simultaneously with the elevated reach 4,4A in the south), the network provided connectivity in all four directions with interchange between the lines and this further increased ridership. Ridership kept increasing and was around 4,50,000 daily (September 2019).

==== Phase 1 lines and sections ====
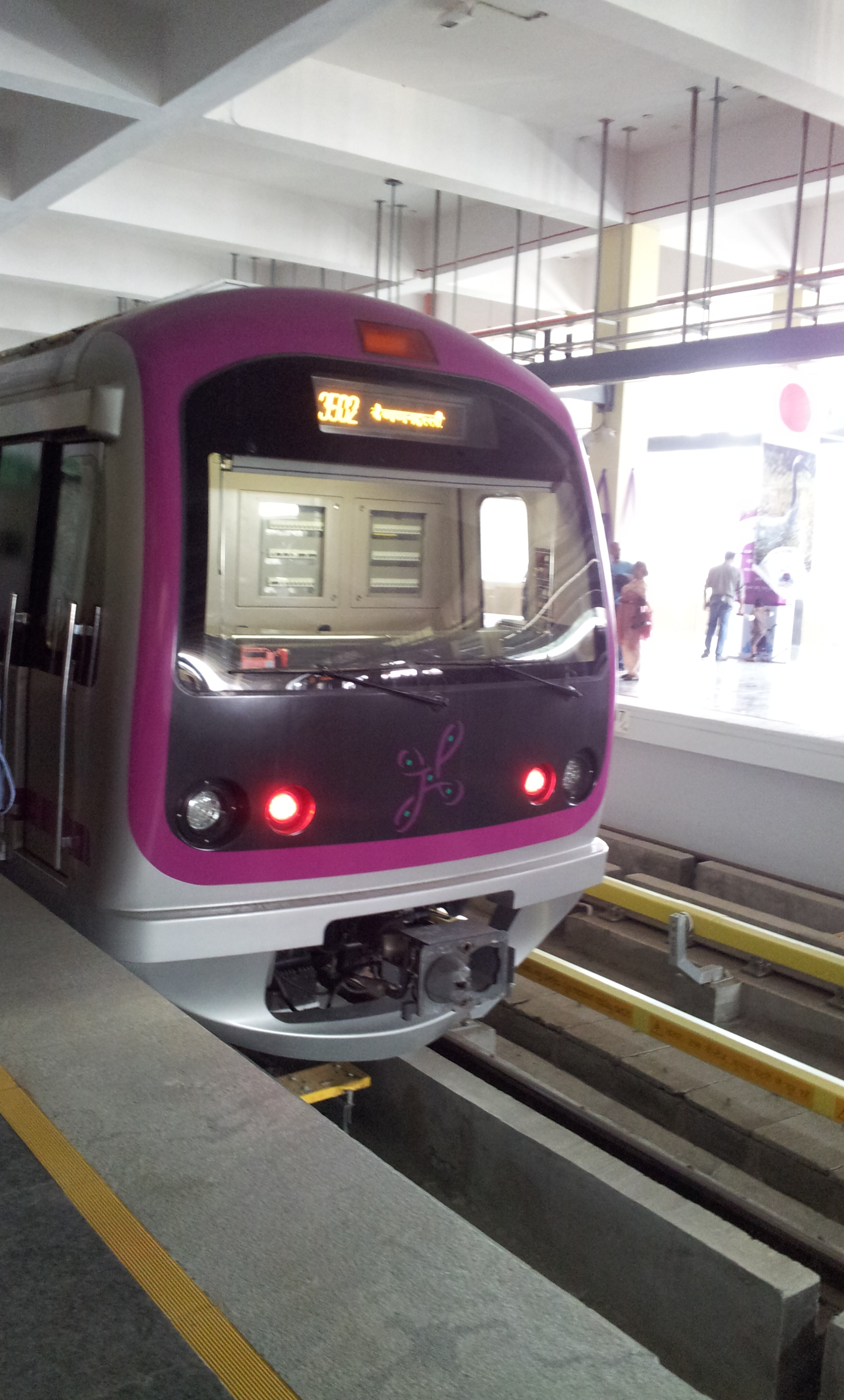
Namma Metro Purple Line train

Phase-1 consists of two lines spanning a length of 42.30 kilometres (26.28 mi), of which about 8.82 kilometres (5.48 mi) is underground and about 33.48 kilometres (20.80 mi) is elevated. There are 41 stations in Phase-1, of which seven stations are underground, one is at grade and 33 are elevated.

The first phase of the project was initially budgeted at ₹6,395 crore (US$875 million). With route extensions and cost escalation, this was later revised to ₹11,609 crores (US$1.6 billion). There were many delays during construction, as a result, there were several postponements. The difficult geological conditions below ground with a mix of soft soil, high groundwater levels, hard granite and large boulders was a major impediment for tunnel boring. A major delay was due to a broken cutter head of TBM Godavari for which spares had to be ordered from Italy. Phase 1, containing two lines aggregating 42.3 km (26.28 mi) was completed and services opened to the public on 19 June 2017. The final cost for Phase 1 was ₹14,405 crores.

Phase 1 network
No.	Line name	Terminals		Stations	Length (km)	Opening date
1	Purple	Baiyappanahalli	Mahatma Gandhi Road	6	6.70 km (4.16 mi)	20 October 2011
1	Purple	Mahatma Gandhi Road	Magadi Road	6	6.4 km (4.0 mi)	30 April 2016
1	Purple	Magadi Road	Mysuru Road	5	5.12 km (3.18 mi)	16 November 2015
2	Green	Mantri Square Sampige Road	Peenya Industry	10	9.91 km (6.16 mi)	1 March 2014
2	Green	Peenya Industry	Nagasandra	3	2.50 km (1.55 mi)	1 May 2015
2	Green	Mantri Square Sampige Road	Yelachenahalli	11	11.62 km (7.22 mi)	18 June 2017
Total				41	42.3 km	

=== Phase 2 ===
The State Government accorded approval for preparation of the detailed project report (DPR) for Phase 2 by DMRC on 4 January 2011. The high power committee (HPC) gave in-principle clearance to proceed with Phase-2 in July 2011. Karnataka government gave in-principle approval to Phase-2 of the Namma Metro project on 3 January 2012. However, there were delays in DPR preparation and hence approval from the Central Government. Phase-2 was cleared by the expenditure finance committee (EFC) in August 2013. The Union Cabinet finally announced that it had approved plans for Phase 2 on 30 January 2014.

The estimated cost for Phase-2 was ₹26,405 crore (US$3.7 billion) at 2011-12 price levels with escalation of 5% annually for 5 years. The State Government would contribute ₹9,000 crore (US$1.3 billion). The Union government would share that part of cost escalation due to increase in central levies, while the state and BMRCL would have to bear any other cost escalations. The total project cost for Phase-2 was estimated to reach ₹30,000 crore (US$4.2 billion) at the start of construction itself. In October 2018, Deputy Chief Minister G Parameshwara stated that the cost of Phase-2 would be around ₹32,000 crore (US$4.5 billion). In May-2025, Karnataka government approved further cost escalation by Rs,9,729 crores. Thus, cost for phase-2 was revised at Rs.40,425 crores (US$5.7 billion)

After an extension of 3.195km to Challaghatta, Phase 2 spanned a total length of 75.29 km with 13.79km underground, 0.48 km (0.298 mi) at grade and 61.37 km (38.13 mi) elevated, and adds 62 stations to the network, of which 12 are underground. Phase-2 included extension of the two Phase-1 lines in both directions, as well as construction of two new lines.

The south end of the Green Line currently ends at Silk Institute (previously named Anjanapura) on Kanakapura Road, and the north end from extends until Madavara (previously named BIEC) on Tumkur Road (NH-4). The east end of the Purple Line would be extended from Baiyappanahalli to Whitefield and the west end currently extends until Challaghatta. A new, 18.82 km (11.694 mi) long, fully elevated line (Yellow Line) was officially inaugurated on 10th August 2025, connecting RV Road to Bommasandra and passing through Electronic City. The second new line will be 21.25 km (13.204 mi) from Kalena Agrahara (previously Gottigere) to Nagawara. The line is mostly underground (13.79 km (8.569 mi)), with a 6.98 km (4.337 mi) elevated section and a 0.48 km (0.298 mi) at-grade section. There are 18 stations on the line, of which 12 are underground and six are elevated. Unlike Phase-1, all stations being built in Phase-2 would have bus bays and/or parking facilities.

Karnataka Industrial Areas Development Board (KIADB) was responsible for acquiring land for Phase-2. It was estimated that 102.02 hectares (252.1 acres) of land would be required for Phase 2 (including Phase 2A). By April 2017, BMRCL had already spent ₹5000 crore on land acquisition.

Construction work began on the south extension of the Green Line from Yelachenahalli to Silk Institute (6.29 km (3.908 mi)) and the west extension of the Purple Line from Mysore Road to Kengeri (8.81 km (5.474 mi)) by October 2016. Construction work on the west extension of Purple Line was awarded in two packages for ₹660 crore, while the Green Line south extension was awarded in a single package for ₹508.86 crore.

Construction work for the north extension of the Green Line (from Nagasandra to Madavara) and the east extension of the Purple Line (from Baiyyappanahalli to Whitefield) began in July 2017. The 3.031 km (1.883 mi) north extension was estimated to cost ₹247.41 crore while the east extension (15.5 km (9.631 mi)) was awarded for ₹1,300 crore (US$180 million).

Construction of the yellow line, a new line from Rashtreeya Vidyalaya Road to Bommasandra in 3 packages began post awarding of tenders in November 2017. The first package (6.418 km / 3.988 mi) was a stretch from Bommasandra to Hosa Road station, including depot entry line to Hebbagodi depot and five Metro stations. The second package was for a 6.38 km (3.964 mi) stretch from Hosa Road to Bommanahalli (previously HSR Layout). Both packages were awarded for ₹1,750 crore (US$250 million) to Thailand-based ITD Cementation India. The third package was for a stretch from RV Road to Bommanahalli (previously HSR Layout), 6.34 km (3.939 mi) long elevated section and five stations, for ₹797.29 crores (US$110 million) and includes the construction of a road-cum-rail flyover, road widening and allied works.

Construction of the 7.5 km (4.660 mi) elevated section of a new pink line between Kalena Agrahara and Suddaguntepalya (previously Tavarekere) stations, estimated to cost ₹575.52 crore (US$81 million) began post tendering in February 2018. The tender includes the construction of the elevated viaduct, 5 stations and car depot line to Kothanur depot.

==== Underground section ====
BMRC initially floated tenders for the construction of the 13.9 km (8.637 mi) underground section in four packages during June 2017. However, the tenders were cancelled as all the bids received were far too high (higher by nearly 70%) at Rs.8553.45 crores (US$1.28 billion) when compared to BMRC's estimated total of Rs 5047.56 crores (about US$760 million).

The second round of tendering resulted in tenders being awarded to three firms during the March–June period, 2019. One of the firms (L&T) won two bids.

The total awarded tunneling tenders for the underground sections was ₹5,925.95 crores (appx US$812 million).

Pre-tunneling construction work and piling for stations began in May 2019 by L&T. Tunnel boring using TBMs began in July 2020 by L&T. Tunnel boring work by the other two contractors (viz. Afcons & ITD-Cem) was commenced in 2021.

==== Phase 2A ====
In September 2016, the government announced that a new 18 km (11 mi) line connecting Silk Board with K.R. Pura would be included in Phase-2 as Phase-2A of the project. The line would be along the eastern half of Outer Ring Road and is proposed to have 13 stations – Silk Board, HSR Layout, Agara, Ibbalur, Bellandur, Kadubeesanahalli, Kodibisanahalli, Marathahalli, ISRO, Doddanekundi, DRDO Sports Complex, Sarasvathi Nagara (previously Mahadevapura) and K.R. Pura. The cost was estimated to be ₹4202 crores. BMRCL prepared the detailed project report for the proposed line and submitted the DPR to the state government on 28 October 2016. Phase 2A was approved by the State Cabinet on 1 March 2017. The ORR Metro line (Blue line) would have interchange stations with the extended Purple Line at K.R. Pura and with the R V Road – Bommasandra line (Yellow Line) at Silk Board.

Tenders for ORR Metro line (east) were called in February 2018 and IL&FS emerged the lowest bidder for all packages. However, the tenders were quashed due to cash flow problems and bankruptcy proceedings by the firm. A second round of tendering was done in December 2019 and bids were received by multiple firms in March 2020. There are two packages. The first package included 2.84 km of ramps for a flyover at Central Silk board junction in addition to 9.859 km of viaduct with six elevated stations. The second package was for 8.377 km viaduct with seven elevated stations, 1.097 km depot line and a 0.30 km pocket track.

==== Phase 2B ====
There had been a proposal to build a 33 km (21 mi) high speed rail line from MG Road to Kempegowda International Airport (KIA), at a cost of ₹5,767 crore (US$810 million). This was to be executed by an independent SPV, but later it was decided that BMRC would manage this project and a regular metro line with fewer halts would be built instead of a high speed rail, thus travel time between city to airport would be less. As early as in February 2012, the Central Government had also requested BMRC to start work on the airport link during Phase 2 itself.

Following this, in September 2016, suggestions were invited from public to choose any one of nine possible extension routes from existing and proposed metro lines to the airport. The proposed extension routes had an average length of 30 km (19 mi), and cost estimates ranged between ₹4,500 crore and ₹7,000 crore. A 25.9 km (16.1 mi) extension from Nagawara via Kannur and Bagaluru was the shortest, while the 35.4 km (22.0 mi) extension from Yeshwanthpur via Yelahanka, Kannur and Bagaluru was the longest of the proposed routes. BMRC received 1,300 responses from the public. A 25.9 km (16.1 mi) extension of the Kalena Agrahara (previously Gottigere) – Nagawara line via Kannur and Bagaluru to the airport emerged as the most popular choice.

Since Bengaluru International Airport Limited (BIAL) forbade underground construction from the southern side of the airport (due to security as it would have to pass beneath the airport's second runway), the shortest route options (i.e. extending the Pink line from Nagawara directly north) were eliminated. An alternate route proceeding north till RK Hegde nagar and then turning west to Jakkur was then explored. However, even this had an obstacle as a high-pressure petroleum pipeline was passing through the originally proposed route.

Bangalore Development Minister K. J. George announced on 12 May 2017 that the government had finalized the Nagawara-Ramakrishna Hegde Nagar-Jakkur-Yelahanka route to the airport. On 10 January 2019, the State Cabinet approved a change in alignment for the proposed metro line to the airport. The new line would begin at Krishnarajapura (K.R. Pura) and be aligned along the northern part of ORR (Outer Ring Road), passing Nagawara, Hebbal, and Jakkur before heading towards the airport along Ballari road. The line would be 39.8 km (24.7 mi) long, about 8 km (5.0 mi) longer than the route previously proposed. It is estimated to cost ₹10,584 crore (US$1.5 billion) almost twice as much as the previous route's estimate of ₹5,950 crore (US$830 million).

The Union Cabinet cleared two much awaited and long delayed lines of the Bengaluru Metro's Phase 2A and 2B on 20 April 2021. Phase 2A and Phase 2B lines total a length of 58.19 km and were approved at a cost of Rs.14,788 crore. The projected ridership on both these lines in 2026 is estimated at 7.7 lakhs. Construction of the airport line is expected to begin by October 2021.

==== Phase 2, 2A, and 2B lines and sections ====
Phase 2 originally involved extending four reaches of the two lines in all directions and two new lines; Yellow and Pink. The ORR-East Line was later included as Phase 2A followed by the Airport Line (as a continuation of the ORR-East Line) as Phase 2B. The line was later named the Blue Line. Construction of Phase 2A has been divided into two (elevated section) packages, while the construction of Phase 2B has been divided into three (elevated section) packages. Airport stations have not been included with tenders as they will likely be built by BIAL.

Phase 2 network (including Ph 2A/B)
No.	Line name	Terminals		Stations	Length (km)	Opening date
1	Purple	Mysuru Road	Kengeri	6	7.50 km (4.66 mi)	30 August 2021
1	Purple	Kengeri	Challaghatta	1	2.05 km (1.27 mi)	9 October 2023
1	Purple	Baiyappanahalli	Krishnarajapura	1	2.10 km (1.30 mi)	9 October 2023
1	Purple	Krishnarajapura	Whitefield (Kadugodi)	12	13.71 km (8.52 mi)	26 March 2023
2	Green	Yelachenahalli	Silk Institute	5	6.29 km (3.91 mi)	15 January 2021
2	Green	Nagasandra	Madavara	3	3.14 km (1.95 mi)	7 November 2024
3	Yellow	Rashtreeya Vidyalaya Road	Delta Electronics Bommasandra	16	19.15 km (11.90 mi)	11 August 2025
4	Pink	Kalena Agrahara	Suddagunte Palya	6	7.5 km (4.7 mi)	13 November 2026
4	Pink	Suddagunte Palya	Nagawara	12	13.75 km (8.54 mi)	September 2027
5	Blue	Central Silk Board	Krishnarajapura	13	16.75 km (10.41 mi)	December 2027
5	Blue	Krishnarajapura	Hebbala	8	12.35 km (7.67 mi)	December 2028
5	Blue	Hebbala	KIAL Terminals	8	30.09 km (18.70 mi)	December 2028
				91	133.48 km	

=== Phase 3 ===
A 124 km (77 mi) Phase 3 was initially proposed in May 2016. Certain significant sections that were proposed for Phase 3 were included in Phase 2 as Phase 2A and Phase 2B. On 7 March 2020 it was announced that two corridors totaling 44.65 km would be built as fully elevated lines under PPP mode (Kempapura-Jayaprakash Nagara 4th Ph (along ORR-West) and Hosahalli-Kadabagere).

On 4 March 2022, during a budget speech by the state government, another new corridor spanning 35 km (22 mi) from Hebbal to Sarjapura was announced (to be taken up as Phase 3A). The Chief Minister stated that the Detailed Project Report (DPR) would be prepared for the proposed corridor, estimated to cost around ₹15,000 crores. The two corridors announced previously were estimated to cost ₹13,500 crores. Later, On 16 August 2024, the Union Cabinet approved Phase 3, which will add two lines and 31 stations, with an estimated cost of ₹15,611 crores. SECON Pvt. Ltd. has officially started geotechnical soil investigation work on Magadi Road for the upcoming 44.65-km Bangalore Metro Phase 3 project. On 11 November 2024, The 35-km stretch between Hebbal and Sarjapura was approved by the state finance department of Karnataka.

Phase 3 network (includes Ph 3A)
No.	Line name	Terminals		Stations	Length (km)	Status	Opening date
6	Orange	Kempapura	N.S. Palya - JP Nagar 4th Phase	22	32.15 km (19.98 mi)	Approved (construction yet to start)	2036
7	Grey	Sri Balagangadharanatha Swamiji Stn., Hosahalli	Kadabagere	9	12.50 km (7.77 mi)	Approved (construction yet to start)	2036
7	Grey	Kadabagere	Tavarekere	5	6.60 km (4.10 mi)	Proposed	2038
8	Red	Hebbala	Sarjapura	28	37.00 km (22.99 mi)	Proposed	2038
Total				59	81.65 km (50.73 mi)		

== Expansion ==
More lines and extensions are under construction. When completed, the 2nd phase (currently underway) will provide connectivity to the city's tech hubs of Electronic City and Whitefield, besides covering the eastern half of Outer Ring Road (ORR) and providing service to the Kempegowda International Airport in the north of the city.

=== Other proposals ===
On 10 March 2023, the Government of Karnataka announced further extensions and routes. The new corridors costing ₹27,000 crores would add 59 km (37 mi) of length to the system. There has also been a proposal for an Inner Ring Line Metro, as recommended by the Indian Institute of Science (IISc) and included in Comprehensive Mobility Plan (CMP-2019).

The Government of Tamil Nadu had sought an extension of the Yellow line from Bommasandra to Hosur Railway Station, located in Hosur, a city near the Karnataka-Tamil Nadu border. The Karnataka Government has advised the Tamil Nadu Government to conduct a feasibility study at its own cost.

== Lines ==
=== Purple Line ===
The Purple Line is aligned northeast-to-southwest, and connects Whitefield (Kadugodi) in the northeast with Challaghatta in the southwest. It is one of the slowest metro lines in India, taking around 1 hour and 29 minutes to traverse the length of 43.45 km, at an average speed of 29 km/h. The line is 43.45 km (27.00 mi) long and has 37 stations. It is elevated on both the east and west sides and has a 4.8 km (3.0 mi) underground section in the middle. The line passes through prime activity centers of the city (Whitefield, ITPL, Krishnarajapura, MG Road, Majestic, Railway Station, Vidhana Soudha, Mysuru Road, and Kengeri).

The first 6.7-kilometre (4.2 mi), 6-station stretch (Reach 1) of the Purple Line between Baiyappanahalli in the east and Mahatma Gandhi Road opened on 20 October 2011. This was the first and inaugural section of Namma Metro. The second 6.4-kilometre (4.0 mi), 6-station stretch (Reach 2) between Mysore Road and Magadi Road opened on 16 November 2015. The underground section, a 4.8 km (3.0 mi) stretch from Cubbon Park to Bengaluru City (KSR) Railway Station opened on 29 April 2016, thus linking the east and west sections that were already opened. Opening the underground section completed the entire Purple Line in Phase 1.

Under Phase 2, the southwest extension of 7.5 km (4.7 mi) opened on 30 August 2021. The eastern extension of 15.2 km (9.4 mi) to Whitefield was under construction. 13.7 km (8.5 mi) of the eastern extension, 12-station stretch which starts from Whitefield (Kadugodi) to KR Pura was opened for service on 26 March 2023 but remained disconnected from the network as a small section was not yet ready (Baiyyappanhalli-KR Pura). On 9 October 2023, Baiyyappanhalli-KR Pura and Kengeri-Challaghatta were also open to the public making the whole line operational from Whitefield (Kadugodi) to Challaghatta. It connects the industrial and suburban areas of south-west with the CBD (MG Road, Trinity) and the IT areas of the east (Baiyappanahalli, Whitefield).

37 new feeder routes of BMTC were introduced in October 2023 from KR Pura station to ensure last-mile connectivity. Stations along the purple metro line are displayed in every coach.

=== Green Line ===
The Green Line is aligned north-to-south and connects Madavara in the north-west to Silk Institute in the south-west, covering a length of 33.46 kilometres (20.79 mi) and has 32 stations. It is elevated on both north and south sides and has a 4.0 km (2.5 mi) underground section in the middle. The Line passes through industrial areas (Peenya, Yeshwanthapur) in the north and also through commercial hubs (Majestic, Chickpete, City Market) and connects large residential catchments in the south (Basavanagudi, Jayanagar, Banashankari, and Thalaghattapura).

The first 9.9-kilometre (6.2 mi), 10-station stretch (Reach 3/3A) of the Green Line opened 1 March 2014. The stretch connected Sampige Road to Peenya Industry. The second 2.5-kilometre (1.6 mi), 3-station stretch (Reach 3B) of the Green Line from Peenya Industry to Nagasandra, opened on 1 May 2015. The third stretch connecting Sampige Road to Yelachenahalli was inaugurated on 17 June 2017 and opened the next day, thereby completing the entire Phase 1. These stretches (including the underground section) were inaugurated by then President late Shri Pranab Mukherjee on 17 March 2017.

Under Phase 2, The southern extension of 6.29-kilometre (3.91 mi), which includes 5 stations from Yelachenahalli to Silk Institute, was inaugurated on 14 January 2021, making it the first section of Phase 2 to be opened for service. The northern extension of 3.14 km (1.95 mi), which includes 3 stations from Nagasandra to Madavara was opened to the public on 7 November 2024, making the whole line operational from Madavara to Silk Institute.

=== Yellow Line ===
The Yellow Line connects Rashtreeya Vidyalaya Road to Bommasandra, covering a length of 19.15-kilometre (11.90 mi) and has 16 stations. This line is completely elevated and runs along the ORR and Hosur road. It begins at Rashtreeya Vidyalaya Road, which is an interchange station with Green Line and passes through two other interchange stations: Jayadeva Hospital station, where it crosses the Pink Line; and Central Silk Board station, where the Blue Line will terminate. The line connects Electronic City with the metro network. Out of 16 stations, 4 stations (Ragigudda, Jayadeva Hospital, BTM Layout, and Central Silk Board) are built along with the new Ragigudda-Silk Board double decker flyover as a rail and road flyover. The entire line was inaugurated on 10 August 2025.

=== Pink Line ===
The Pink Line is aligned from south to north and connects Kalena Agrahara in the south with Nagawara in the north, covering a length of 21.25-kilometre (13.20 mi) and having 18 stations. It is elevated on the southern side till Suddaguntepalya, and the rest is underground till the northern end at Nagawara. The line will pass through N.S. Palya - JP Nagar 4th Phase station (interchange with Orange Line), Jayadeva Hospital station (interchange with Yellow Line) and Mahatma Gandhi Road (interchange with Purple Line). it passes through the Cantonment railway station and ends at Nagawara, which is planned as an interchange station with the Blue Line. The elevated section from Kalena Agrahara to Suddagunte Palya was inaugurated on 13 November 2026.

=== Blue Line (Under Construction) ===
The Blue Line is aligned along the eastern and northern sections of ORR. It deviates from ORR at Hebbal and proceeds along Airport Road to Kempegowda International Airport. Construction is being handled in two sections: Phase 2A covers Central Silk Board to Krishnarajapura and Phase 2B covers Krishnarajapura to Airport. The line will totally be 58.19-kilometre (36.16 mi) long and have 32 stations. It is elevated almost throughout, with a small underground section in way of Yelahanka Airforce base. The line also has a section at grade level closer to the airport. Airport station will be an underground station. This line begins at Central Silk Board (interchange with the Yellow Line), and passes through Krishnarajapura (interchange with the Purple Line) and Nagawara (interchange with the Pink Line). It also passes through Hebbal and Yelahanka. The under-construction line is expected to open in June 2026.

Phase 2A and Phase 2B (Krishnarajapura – Yelahanka – Bangalore Airport) will be funded through a $500 million loan by the Asian Development Bank (ADB) which was approved by its board in December 2020. Japan International Cooperation Agency (JICA) will provide a $318 million loan as well. A formal agreement for this was signed in March 2021.

== Network ==
Namma Metro
No.	Line Name	Terminals		Stations	Length	First Operation	Last Extension
1	Purple	Challaghatta	Whitefield (Kadugodi)	37	43.49 km (27.02 mi)	20 October 2011	9 October 2023
2	Green	Silk Institute	Madavara	32	33.46 km (20.79 mi)	1 March 2014	7 November 2024
3	Yellow	Rashtreeya Vidyalaya Road	Delta Electronics Bommasandra	16	19.15 km (11.90 mi)	11 August 2025	
4	Pink	Kalena Agrahara	Suddagunte Palya	6	7.5 km (4.7 mi)	13 November 2026	
				88	103.6 km (64.4 mi)		

== Finances ==
=== Funding ===
==== Phase 1 ====
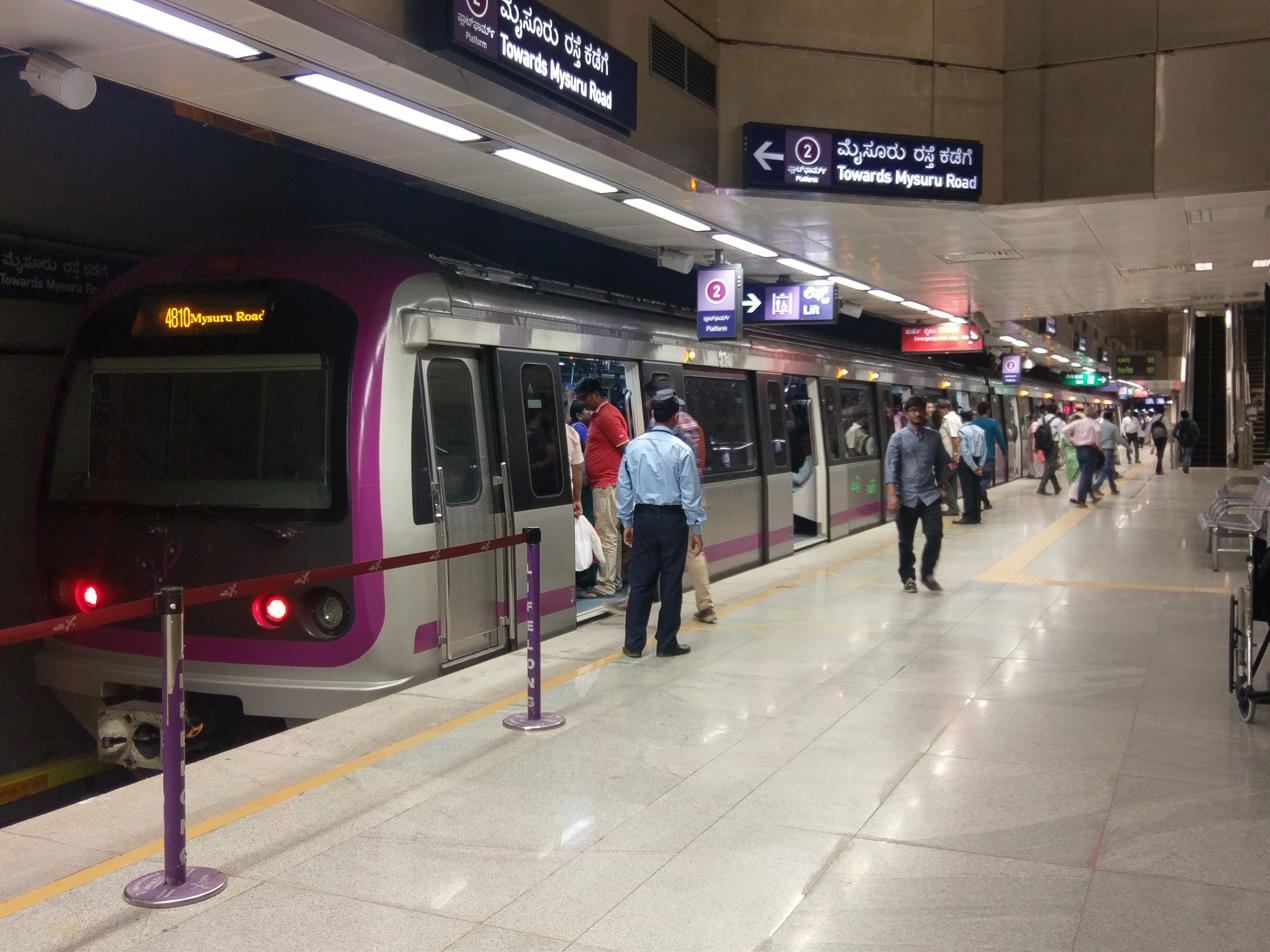
Nadaprabhu kempegowda station, Majestic

Phase 1 missed nine deadlines, and its cost was revised four times. The initial cost estimate for Phase 1 when it was approved in 2006 was ₹6,395 crore (US$680 million). The increase in length from 33 to 42.3 km (20.5 to 26.3 mi) increased the total cost to ₹8,158 crore (US$870 million). Delays caused further escalations. The cost rose to ₹11,609 crore (US$1.2 billion) in 2011 and ₹13,845 crore (US$1.5 billion) in 2015. The final cost to build Phase 1 was estimated at ₹14,405.01 crore (US$1.5 billion). Land acquisition for Phase 1 accounted for ₹2,500 crore (US$270 million).

The Central and State Government funded 58.91% of the cost. The remaining 41.09% was secured through loans from domestic and foreign financial institutions. BMRCL secured ₹6,500 crore (US$690 million) through long-term loans and ₹300 crore (US$32 million) by selling bonds, while the remaining cost was funded by Central Government and the State Government. BMRCL secured loans from several agencies – ₹3,000 crore (US$320 million) from the Japan International Cooperation Agency (JICA), ₹600 crore (US$64 million) from the Housing and Urban Development Corporation Limited (HUDCO), ₹25 crore (US$2.7 million) from the Asian Development Bank (ADB), and the rest from the French Development Agency. Approximately 10% of the ₹6500 crore had to be paid as interest by the BMRCL each year. The Federation of Karnataka Chambers of Commerce and Industry (FKCCI) estimated that this amounted to an interest payment of ₹2 crore (US$210,000) per day. BMRCL stated that interest component wasn't that high but it was "definitely more than ₹1 crore (US$110,000) per day".

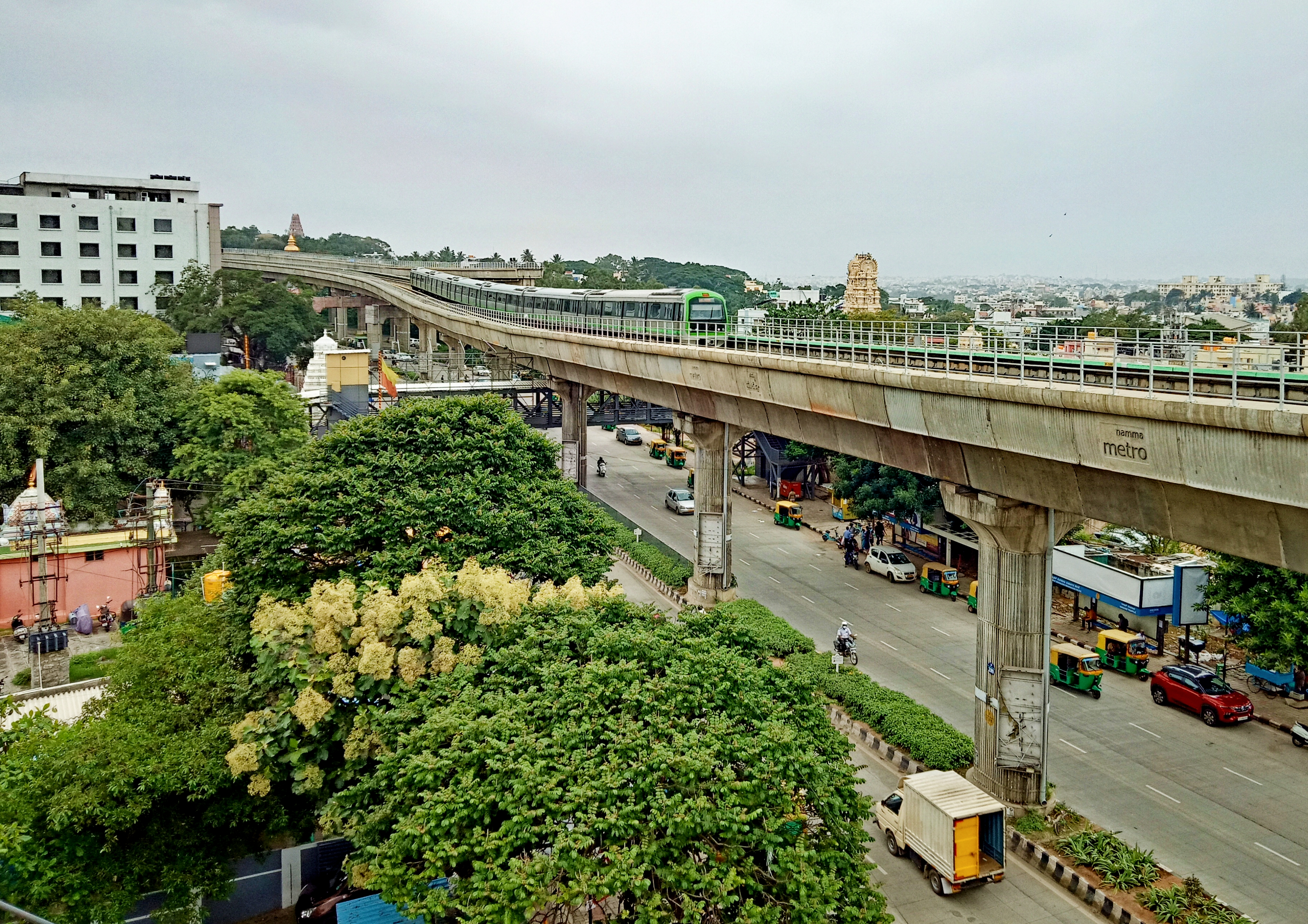
Namma Metro elevated section

==== Phase 2 /2A /2B ====
On 3 January 2012, the Karnataka government approved a budget of ₹27,000 crore (US$2.9 billion) for Phase 2 of Namma Metro project. Phase 2 is estimated to cost ₹26,405 crore (US$2.8 billion). Land acquisition is expected to account for ₹5,000 crore (US$530 million). The Central and State Governments will fund around ₹15,000 crore. The State and Central Governments will bear 30% and 20% of the project cost respectively. The remaining will be obtained through senior term loans. BMRCL is permitted to raise up to ₹9,000 crore through loans.

On 27 March 2012, Asian Development Bank (ADB) signed an agreement to lend $250 million to BMRC to part-finance Phase 2. The loan marked the multilateral lending agency's foray into the urban transport sector in South Asia, the ADB said in a press release. The loan, approved by the ADB Board in March 2011, is the first ADB loan to the urban transport sector without recourse to sovereign guarantees. In 2016, the Agence Francaise De Development (AFD) sanctioned a ₹1,600 crore loan for the project. The rate of interest on the loan is linked to Euro Interbank Offered Rate (Euribor) + 130 basis points. In early 2017, the European Investment Bank agreed to loan ₹3,700 crore to BMRCL, with a repayment period of 20 years at a rate of interest lower than the one on the AFD loan.

In May 2017, BMRC received in-principle approval from the European Investment Bank (EIB) to fund construction of the Gottigere-Nagawara line through a ₹3700 crore loan. The line is being co-financed by the Asian Infrastructure Investment Bank and the Central and State Governments.

Indian firms Biocon and Infosys announced that they would provide funding for the construction of the Hebbagodi and Electronics City metro stations respectively on the RV Road-Bommasandra Metro line. BMRC expects that each firm will contribute ₹100 crore (US$11 million) towards the project. Biocon CMD Kiran Mazumdar Shaw stated that the company wanted to fund the project because it would help decongest the city. Both Biocon and Infosys have offices located near the stations.

BMRCL secured a $318 million loan from JICA in March 2021, and a $500 million loan from the ADB in August 2021 to fund construction of the ORR-Airport metro. The State and Union governments will contribute ₹3,973 crore (US$420 million), and the Karnataka Government will pay an additional ₹2,762 crore (US$300 million) for land acquisition.

=== Revenues ===
During the first month since the opening of Reach I of just 6.7 km, about 13,25,000 people travelled by metro. On average, 41,390 people took the train every day, while the average daily revenue was ₹667,262. The BMRC earned a revenue of ₹2.1 crore (US$220,000) in its first month of operation. However, in the first six months of operation, average ridership went down to 24,968. The BMRC earned a total of ₹6.6 crore (US$710,000) in the same period. Namma Metro posted a profit of ₹41 lakh (equivalent to ₹84 lakh or US$90,000 in 2026) after about one year of operations of Reach I. BMRCL estimates that nearly 80 lakh passengers travelled on the system in its first year of operations. Namma metro is also pursuing selling retail space within the metro stations to generate non-fare revenue.

Note: The following table shows annual ridership and farebox revenue of Namma Metro since inception. The passenger count is calculated from average daily passenger count.

Year	Passengers	Fare box revenue (₹)	Total Revenue (₹)	Profits/Loss (₹)
2011–12	41,66,000	₹6.17 crore (US$660,000)		
2012–13	66,36,000	₹8.70 crore (US$930,000)	₹49.46 crore (US$5.3 million)	-57.06
2013–14	72,55,000	₹9.86 crore (US$1.1 million)	₹35.93 crore (US$3.8 million)	-83.18
2014–15	1,14,00,000	₹17.83 crore (US$1.9 million)	₹42.98 crore (US$4.6 million)	-263.26
2015–16	1,68,00,000	₹28.29 crore (US$3.0 million)	₹54.24 crore (US$5.8 million)	-360.99
2016–17	5,42,25,130	₹110.09 crore (US$12 million)	₹145.12 crore (US$16 million)	-457.85
2017–18	10,92,06,905	₹281.00 crore (US$30 million)	₹539.48 crore (US$58 million)	-352.25
2018–19	13,37,38,555	₹355.02 crore (US$38 million)	₹535.86 crore (US$57 million)	-498.41
2019–20	17,42,19,000	₹376.88 crore (US$40 million)	₹476.23 crore (US$51 million)	-598.58
2020–21	3,50,40,000	₹49.19 crore (US$5.3 million)	₹86.78 crore (US$9.3 million)	-912.14
2021–22	8,21,25,000	₹163.33 crore (US$17 million)	₹228.76 crore (US$24 million)	-455.79
2022–23	17,73,90,000	₹422.61 crore (US$45 million)	₹784.55 crore (US$84 million)	-641.86
2023–24	23,27,76,000	₹573.91 crore (US$61 million)	₹990.02 crore (US$110 million)	-349.07
2024–25	27,66,70,000	₹753.59 crore (US$81 million)	₹1,190.99 crore (US$130 million)	-623.93

== Infrastructure ==
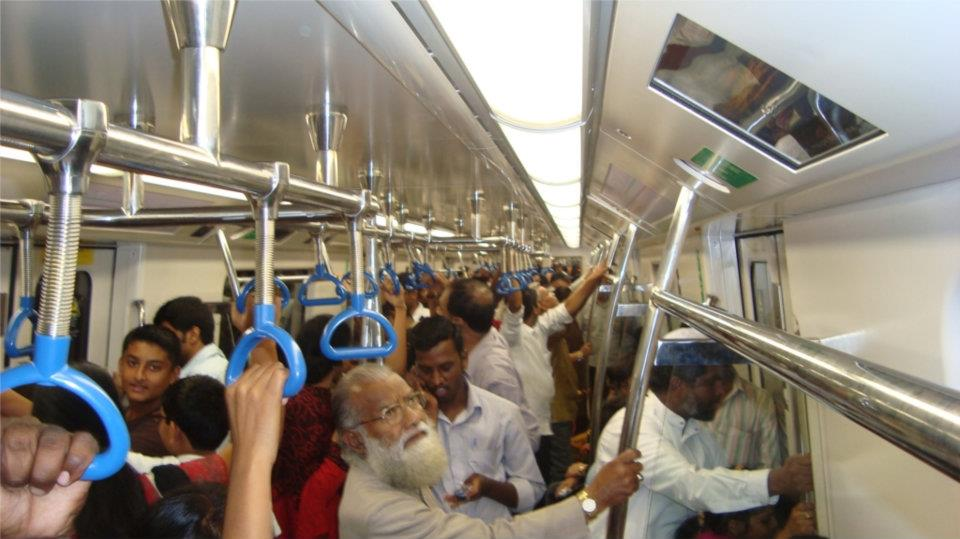
Inside a Metro coach on the day of Inauguration

=== Rolling stock ===
BMRC procured 150 metro coaches for fifty three-car train sets in DMC-TC-DMC formation for Phase l of Namma Metro from BEML – Hyundai Rotem, at a cost of Rs 1,672.50 crore (Rs 16.72 billion). Coach specifications were as follows: length 20.8m, width 2.88m, and height 3.8m. Each coach had a seating capacity of about 50 and standing capacity of 306 (basis 8 per sqm). Thus, each train had a capacity of about 1000. Traction is through four 180 kW motors in each motor coach. The trains have a maximum speed of 80 kmph and axle load of 15 tonnes. The trains operate on 750V DC with third rail bottom power collector system. Features include stainless steel body fully air-conditioned coaches, longitudinal bank of wide seats, wide vestibules between coaches, non-skid and non-slip floor surfaces, wi-fi enabled, four wide passenger access doors on each side, wide windows, automatic voice announcement system and electronic information and destination display system.

Initial operations began with three-coach trains. Each train had a capacity of 1000 passengers. As ridership increased, all trains were converted to six coaches.

The first train set made a trial run in December 2010. In early 2017, BMRC floated tenders for an additional 150 coaches to convert all trains to 6 coach trains on the two Phase 1 routes. On 27 March 2017, BEML announced that it had won an ₹1,421 crore contract to supply the coaches. The first six car train was introduced on the Purple Line on 23 June 2018. By January 2020, all trains had been converted to six coaches.

Free Wi-Fi service was made available to commuters on 31 July 2013. Passengers also have emergency voice communication with train staff through a speaker system. Passengers are provided with a call button to communicate with the driver or control center during an emergency.

Rolling Stock Data for Operational Lines
No.	Line name	Terminals		Stations	Length	Rolling Stock					
No.	Line name	Terminals		Stations	Length	Available		On Order		Total	
No.	Line name	Terminals		Stations	Length	Train Sets	Coaches Per Train Set	Train Sets	Coaches Per Train Set	Train Sets	Coaches Per Train Set
1	Purple	Challaghatta	Whitefield (Kadugodi)	37	43.49 km (27.02 mi)	40	6	–	6	40	6
2	Green	Silk Institute	Madavara	32	33.46 km (20.79 mi)	24	6	14	6	38	6
3	Yellow	Rashtreeya Vidyalaya Road	Delta Electronics Bommasandra	16	19.15 km (11.90 mi)	15	6	6	6	21	6
4	Pink	Kalena Agrahara	Suddagunte Palya	6	7.5 km (4.7 mi)	11	6	12	6	23	6
Total				88	103.6 km (64.37 mi)	90	540	32	192	122	732
Rolling Stock data for Lines Under Construction
5	Blue	Central Silk Board	KIAL Terminals	29	58.19 km (36.16 mi)	2	6	35	6	37	222
Total				29	58.19 km (36.16 mi)	2	12	35	210	37	222

=== Phase 2/2A/2B ===
216 coaches for the Yellow Line as well as extensions of the Purple and Green Lines will be delivered by CRRC Nanjing Puzhen in partnership with Titagarh Wagons, with 204 of 216 coaches to be built in India. BMRCL awarded a contract to BEML to supply 360 coaches (60 trainsets with six coaches each) in August 2023 valued at 3,177Cr. 138 coaches (23 trainsets) will be deployed on the Pink Line, while 222 coaches (37 trainsets) will be deployed on the Blue Line.

On 31 August 2024 BEML revealed the design of upcoming rolling stock for the Pink Line and Blue Line. The first prototype of Pink Line rolled out in December 2025. The coaches for the Blue Line will have specially designed luggage racks for passengers since the Blue Line connects to Kempegowda International Airport.

In December 2025, BMRCL placed an order of 36 additional coaches (6 trainsets) for the Yellow Line. BMRCL announced that out of the 36 trainsets from CRRC-Titagarh, 21 DTG trainsets which was supposed to be deployed for both Green and Purple Lines, will now be commissioned only for the Green Line and 17 existing trainsets from BEML will be transferred from Green Line to Purple Line.

=== Power supply ===
In December 2009, ABB was awarded the contract to provide power solutions for the first phase of the planned metro network. ABB designed, supplied, installed and commissioned four substations that receive and distribute electricity, each rated at 66/33 kV, as well as the auxiliary and traction substations. ABB also provided an integrated network management system, or SCADA (supervisory control and data acquisition), to monitor and control the installations. BMRC currently pays BESCOM ₹5.7 per unit of electricity.

In 2016, BMRCL signed an agreement with CleanMax Solar to set up solar installations at Baiyapanahalli and Peenya stations. After Phase 2 of the metro is complete, CleanMax Solar will set up similar installations at the metro depots in Challaghatta, Whitefield, Kothanur and Hebbagodi. As per the agreement, CleanMax Solar will bear the cost of installation and the BMRC will pay CleanMax a rate of ₹5.5 per unit of electricity for three years. Following the three-year period, all six installations will be transferred to the BMRC. According to the BMRC director of operations NM Dhoke, "The 1.4 MW installation can generate up to 10,000 units, which help power the depot facilities. However, it is not sufficient to power the trains, but it will help us save ₹51 crore over 25 years on energy".

In February 2019, Alstom was awarded a GBP 62 million contract to provide electrification systems for Phase 2 of the Namma Metro. The company will construct 56 substations to supply power for Phase 2 of the system.

=== Signaling ===
In September 2009, the consortium led by Alstom Project India Limited was awarded a contract worth ₹563.4 crore (US$60.2 million) to supply control and signalling system for the first phase of the project. The consortium is led by Alstom and composed of Alstom Transport SA, Thales Group Portugal S A, and Sumitomo Corporation. Alstom will provide the design, manufacture, supply, installing, testing, and commissioning of the train control and signalling system and Thales will provide the design, installing, testing, and commissioning of the telecommunication system for Phase 1 of the metro system. It includes the Urbalis 200 Automatic Train Control system which will ensure optimal safety, flexible operations and heightened passenger comfort.

The integrated control center at Baiyyappanahalli has direct communication with trains and stations are CCTV fitted with visual and audio service information. Passengers have emergency voice communication with train staff.

=== Stations ===
There are 83 stations on the Namma Metro network. Majestic station is the largest with a total floor area of 48,000 square metres (520,000 sq ft).

Initially, there were no toilets at Namma Metro stations. BMRCL eventually heeded public demand, and the metro's first toilets were opened at Baiyappanahalli and Indiranagar stations on 21 June 2013. As of February 2017, there were 33 ATMs at Namma Metro stations.

The 12 underground stations built during Phase 2 will be smaller in size than the underground stations built in Phase I to minimise land acquisition costs. All Phase I underground stations were 272 meters long and 24 meters wide, except for Chikkapete and K.R. Market stations which had the same width but were 240 meters long. In contrast, Phase 2's underground stations are shorter at 210 meters but retain the same width.

On 17 February 2017, Uber announced that it would open booking counters at 12 metro stations by the end of March 2017. The counters enable commuters to book an Uber, and is aimed at commuters who do not have access to the internet or do not have the Uber mobile app installed on their phone. Ola Cabs announced a similar arrangement on 22 February 2017.

=== Depots ===
Under Phase 1, two depots were built at Baiyyappanahalli and Peenya. For the line extensions in Phase 2, BMRC is building additional depots at Silk Institute on the Green Line and at Challaghatta and Kadugodi for the Purple Line. For the new lines in Phase 2, depots are being built at Kothanur (Pink Line) and at Hebbagodi (Yellow Line).

For the Blue Line (airport line, Phase 2A), the Baiyyappanahalli depot is planned to be used as two depots are being built for the Purple Line at its ends. In addition, a depot is planned at Doddajala, near the Trumpet inter-change. The depot at Baiyappanahalli has an operations control center for managing the metro network and also a training center.

Operational Depots
No.	Line name	Depot	Area (In Acres)	Remarks
1	Purple	Kadugodi	44.8	Depot-cum-workshop
2	Green	Peenya	100	Depot-cum-workshop; To also be used by Orange Line
3	Yellow	Hebbagodi	39.3	Depot-cum-workshop
4	Pink	Kothanur	31.5	Depot-cum-workshop
Under Construction
No.	Line name	Depot	Area (In Acres)	Remarks
1	Purple	Challaghatta	38.9	Depot-cum-workshop
2	Blue	Baiyyappanahalli	50	Depot-cum-workshop; Operation control center; Metro training center
3	Blue	Shettigere	22.62	Depot-cum-workshop
4	Green	Anjanapura	8.9	Depot, stabling
Proposed Depots
No.	Line name	Depot	Area (In Acres)	Remarks
1	Orange	Sumanahalli	75	Depot-cum-workshop
1	Grey	Sumanahalli	75	Depot-cum-workshop
2	Red	Sarjapur	TBD	TBD

=== Vertical gardens ===
The BMRC granted permission to Hydrobloom, a start-up company, to grow hydroponic plants on the pillars of the Namma Metro. Pillars covered with plants are referred to as vertical gardens. Hydrobloom had previously developed a vertical garden on a metro pillar near Rangoli Art Centre next to the MG Road Metro station. The gardens are intended for beautification and to reduce air pollution.

=== Safety ===
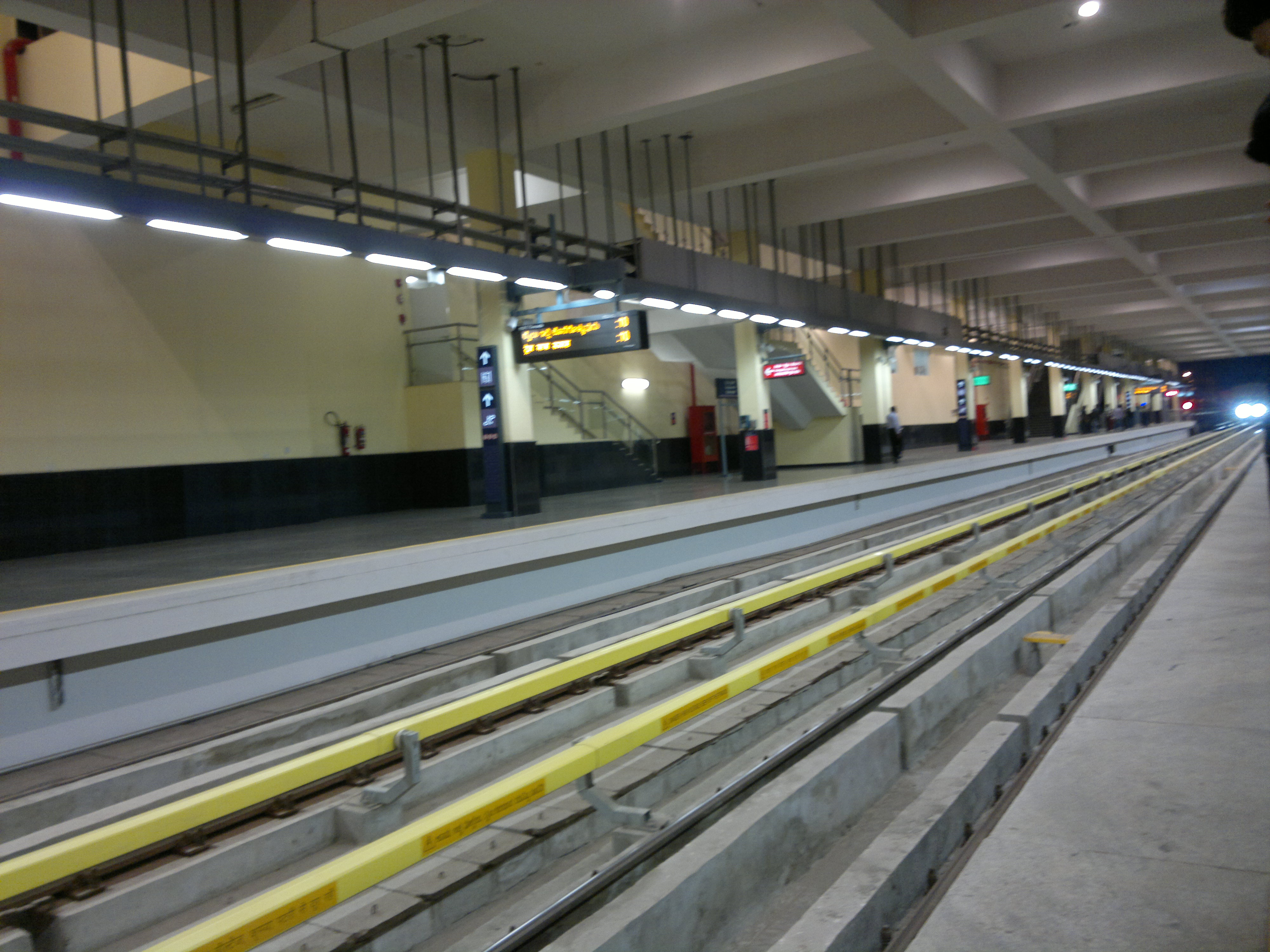
Derailment guard installed across the network

As of February 2014, BMRCL has two road-cum-rail rescue vehicles that can be used to perform evacuations or re-load derailed trains back onto the track.

The trains are equipped with derailment prevention equipment, and the tracks are equipped with concrete barriers to prevent trains from leaving the viaduct. The support pillars are earthquake-proof and are designed to have a lifespan of at least 100 years. Trains are equipped with sensors to detect impending collisions, and have automatic braking systems to prevent speed limits from being exceeded. In case of train stoppages midway between stations during emergencies, pavements beside tracks are provided on elevated viaducts as well as in underground sections.

Since its opening, suicides on Namma Metro tracks have been a prevalent issue, and have raised concerns over the absence of platform screen doors, a safety feature present in other comparably lengthy Indian metro systems such as the Mumbai Metro, Kolkata Metro and Chennai Metro. All lines from the Pink Line onwards are equipped with platform-screen gates (platform-screen doors in underground stations). Following strong public demand, in August 2024, BMRCL has decided to retrofit all existing metro stations with PSDs as well, beginning with the Nadaprabhu Kempegowda (Majestic) and Sir M. Visveshwaraya (Central College) stations on the Purple Line.

=== Accessibility ===
Yellow tactile tiles are used at all stations to guide the visually impaired. The tiles start at the ramp and lead to the staircases and lifts. Disabled and elderly passengers can avail a wheelchair at all metro stations. The wheelchair can be used by the passenger to board a train and then dropped off at the destination station. In February 2017, BBMP and BMRC began a project to upgrade all footpaths along metro routes. The project is estimated to cost ₹40 crore and was scheduled to be completed in 18 months.

=== Rainwater harvesting ===
BMRCL, in a public-private partnership, harvests rainwater from the viaducts on the rail system. The private partner, Karnataka Rural Infrastructure Development (KRIDL), collects the water at multiple points, treats it, and sells it in bulk as potable water. Pipes inside each metro viaduct pillar carry the rainwater from the viaduct down to underground tanks located beneath the median. When these tanks overflow, the water is diverted to 5 metres deep rainwater harvesting pits. Two rainwater harvesting pits are installed between each pillar. The average length between the two pillars is 28 meters. As of March 2017, a 33.48 km (20.80 mi) of the elevated metro is covered by the rainwater harvesting system. With the completion of Phase 2 of the metro, the BMRCL will cover a total of 58 km (36 mi) with rainwater harvesting systems. Around 8 crore litres of water are expected to be collected annually.

BMRCL also harvests rainwater from the 140 acres depot facility at Peenya. Water will be collected from the 190,000 sq foot roof and stored in two tanks with a capacity of 50,000 litres each. Rainwater harvesting is also planned in existing and under-construction stations. The water harvested will be supplied to places where needed, and any excess will be used for groundwater recharge.

BMRC has installed a water harvesting system along Reach 1 and will be doing the same for Reaches 3 and 4. Installation of flower beds was delayed due to garbage being dumped on the median by garbage collectors, BMRC will also set up flower beds on Reach 1 with assistance from the horticulture department. However, the work related to this has slowed down due to garbage contractors dumping garbage along the median, due to the lack of a waste management plan in the city. BMRC also planned to rejuvenate Kengeri and Veerasandra lakes using water collected from a nearby corridor.

== Operations ==
=== Fare collection ===
Ticket tokens (front and back view)

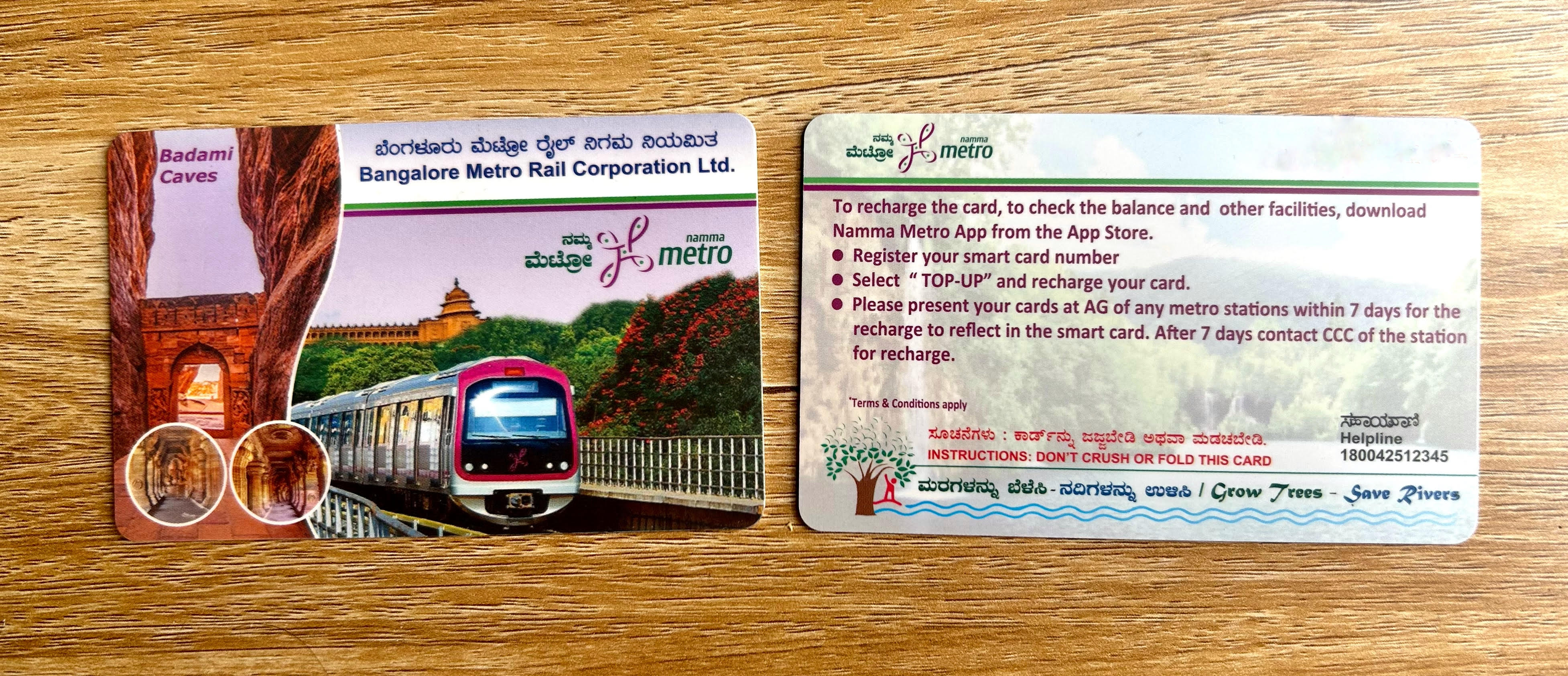
Varshik Card (front and reverse)

MIFARE DESFire platform, developed by NXP Semiconductors, was selected to manage the Automated Fare Collection (AFC) for Namma Metro. The system uses contactless smart tokens, QR based tickets and contactless smart card.

Tokens are available only for a single journey and are captured by the gates on exit. Namma Metro also provided group tickets which is a paper ticket with a higher discount for groups of people that was manually verified to pass through the gates. Smart cards can be used for multiple journeys. There is currently one type of smart card available on the metro. The smart card recharge can be done online through the Namma Metro app, Paytm and Amazon Pay.

- BMRC smart card or Varshik is priced at ₹50, with ₹50 as a user deposit. The card is rechargeable, however for online transactions, the card is required to be presented at the gates within seven days and after one hour of recharge or at the card top-up terminals installed at all metros before 15 days after recharge to update the recharged amount on the card. Failing to do so, the amount will be refunded automatically with 2.5% service fee within 30 days. The card can be recharged anywhere from ₹50 to ₹2,500 in increments of ₹50. Initially planned to be valid for one year after the last recharge, the validity has been changed to 10 years. It provides a 5% (earlier 15%) discount on fares.
- Saral was available for ₹70. It permitted one day's travel on BMTC non-air-conditioned buses and on the metro. Saral is no longer available.
- Saraag was available for ₹110. It permitted one day's travel on BMTC air-conditioned buses and on the metro. Saraag is no longer available.
- Sanchar was available in denominations of ₹10, ₹40, ₹50 and ₹100. Sanchar was withdrawn from 1 March 2017.
- National Common Mobility Card (NCMC) can be purchased from Namma metro stations free of charge by surrendering their varshik cards and in select Bank branches from 30 March. Initially the NCMC card was expected to be also used for shopping, fuel and travelling anywhere within India including BMTC and KSRTC ticketing. However, as of September 2023, BMTC and KSRTC do not support NCMC cards.. As on September 2026, Namma BMTC 2.0 was released where passengers can book bus and metro tickets on the app, and NCMC Card can be used on the Metro and all BMTC Buses.

BMRCL began selling tokens through automatic ticket vending machines (ATVMs) on 4 December 2012 at MG Road, Indiranagar and Baiyyappanahalli stations. The service will eventually be expanded to all metro stations. The touchscreen-enabled ATVMs are available in three languages – English, Kannada, and Hindi. Commuters can purchase a single journey token by selecting the destination station or the amount in the ATVM. They can also add value or add trips to the contactless smart card. Commuters can purchase up to eight tickets at a time and can get the receipt printer for card recharge. ATVMs accept coins of ₹5 and ₹10 denominations and ₹10, 20, 50, 100, 500 denominations of currency notes. However, the ATVM cannot differentiate between ₹1 and ₹2 coins.

In November 2016, BMRC began accepting online payments to recharge smart cards. Approximately 68% of passengers on the metro use smart tokens and 32% use smart cards.

Metro system in Bengaluru charges full fare tickets for children above three years of age which is against the Indian government circular date 6 March 2020, No. TC-II/2910/2016/child fare/VIP. Circular number 12 states that "Children under five years of age shall be carried free and purchase of any ticket is not required". "In case of children of age 5 years to under 12 years of age (in case of no berth) only half of the applicable fare shall be charged and in this case, a minimum distance of charge shall not be applicable". (CC30 of 2017 dated 24 April 2017). Similarly Karnataka government public transport system does not collect fares from children under the age of 6 yrs and half fares from children under 12 yrs of age. Bengaluru metro decided to include 3 ft as a criterion to decide who is classified as a child. The average height of Indian babies at 3 yrs is much more than 90 cms. Since BMRCL is a joint venture of the Government of India and the Government of Karnataka, it should be expected to follow Government of India/ Karnataka rules.

On 26 March 2023, Prime Minister Narendra Modi symbolically launched the long-awaited National Common Mobility Card (NCMC) in Bengaluru while he traveled on the newly inaugurated Whitefield stretch of the Purple Line using the NCMC.

On 9 February 2025, Namma Metro increased its fares, making it the costliest metro system in India. The steep fare hikes resulted in over 100% increase on certain routes, later capped at 71% following public backlash. The fare hike led to a decline in ridership and widespread criticism from commuters and civic groups. Concerns were raised that the fare increase would discourage public transport usage and encourage private vehicle dependency, exacerbating Bengaluru's already severe traffic congestion.

=== Frequency ===
The metro service runs between 05:00 and 23:00 hours. The service starts at 07:00 hours on Sundays. The end-to-end travel time on the Purple Line is approximately 85 minutes, and on the Green Line, nearly 60 minutes. Trains run every 5 minutes between Mysuru Road and Garudacharpalya on the Purple Line and between Nagasandra and Yelachenahalli on the Green Line, and every 10 minutes on other stations, due to inadequate trains. The frequency may be increased after new trains are delivered to BMRCL. Trains currently run at an interval of 10 minutes on the Yellow Line, as only seven trains are available. Frequency on the Yellow Line will increase to 5 minutes after all trains are delivered, with an expected 15-train capacity.

Metro services have occasionally operated beyond 23:00 hours. Services are usually extended on festival days or when an international cricket match is held in the city.

=== Ridership ===
The Purple Line's Reach-1 of 6.7 km was the first to open, in October 2011. On the first three days of operations of Reach-1, 169,019 people rode the metro. At the end of the fourth day, about 200,000 passengers had already commuted on Namma Metro. In the first month since opening of Reach-1, about 1,325,000 people had travelled by metro. Thus, on average, 41,390 people took the train each day during the first month. However, the average ridership in the first six months of operation dropped to 24,968.

The northern section of the Green Line (Reach 3, 3A - 9.9 km) opened in March 2014. About 25,000 passengers travelled on the northern section on the opening day. In the first month of operations of the Green Line stretch, 762,000 people used the line, at a daily average of 24,605.

Reach-1, Reach-3/3A and Reach-2 (opened in November 2015) operated independently until the east–west underground section of Purple Line (connecting Reaches 1 and 2) was opened in April 2016. Once the east and west reaches were inter-connected with the intermediate underground section of the Purple Line, ridership surged hugely to nearly 100,000 a day on the line in the first few days. After the north–south underground section was opened (simultaneously with the elevated reaches 4,4A in the south), the network provided connectivity in all four directions with interchange between the lines and this increased ridership further, reaching between 350,000 and 360,000 on average by December 2017.

As ridership kept growing, overcrowding became a serious concern. Hence, 3-coach trains began to be converted to 6 coaches. The first six car train was introduced on the Purple Line on 23 June 2018. By January 2020, all trains had been converted to six coaches.

During 2019–20, the annual ridership was 174.22 million (average during the year was thus 477,315). The maximum daily ridership of 601,164 was on 25 October 2019 while the highest daily revenue of Rs.1.67 crore was on 2 March 2020. In January 2020, ridership averaged 518,074.

Due to the COVID-19 pandemic, services were halted from 25 March 2020 onwards. Operations resumed on 7 September 2020. In the second wave, operations were again halted from 27 April 2021 to 20 June 2021. Services remained limited throughout the pandemic period and ridership was low due to enforcement of constrained capacity and social distancing norms, as stipulated by the state government.

As of March 2024, the metro system had an average daily ridership of about 636,000 passengers. On 11 August 2025, the ridership was 10.48 lakh, the highest recorded till then in the history of Namma Metro, surpassing 10 lakh for the first time, soon after the launch of Yellow line.

=== Speed ===
The system is designed for a maximum train speed of 80 km/h (50 mph). However, the Research Design and Standards Organization (RDSO) fixed the speed at which trains are allowed to operate commercially as 67.50 km/h (41.94 mph) on straight sections, 35 km/h (22 mph) on curves, and 45 km/h (28 mph) in stations.

=== Security ===
The Karnataka State Industrial Security Force (KSISF) is responsible for security on the Namma Metro. Bangalore Police conducted detailed mock drills at metro stations for the first time on 25 March 2017. Police officials stated that the drill was to assess readiness to deal with situations such as hoax bomb calls, terrorist infiltration, or attacks. Sniffer dogs, bomb detection and disposal squad, anti-sabotage squad, and Quick Reaction Teams (QRTs) were involved in the drill. Police had previously conducted basic mock drills, but this was the first one aimed toward dealing with specific threats. The chosen day was a Saturday, when crowds are usually larger, in order to make the drill more challenging for officers. The BMRCL had not informed of the drill in advance.

=== Laws ===
The Bangalore Metro Rail (Carriage and Ticket) Rules 2011 limit the weight of personal baggage to 15 kg. Rule 3 says: "No person shall, while traveling in metro railway, carry with him any goods other than small baggage containing personal belongings not exceeding 60cm x 45cm x 25cm in size and 15kg in weight, except with the prior approval of the metro railway administration." The rules also prohibit carrying explosive, inflammable, and poisonous substances.

The Metro Railway (Operations and Maintenance) Act, 2002, imposes fines and in some cases jail sentences for offences committed on the metro. Anyone indulging in sabotaging the train or maliciously hurting or attempting to hurt other passengers while travelling in the metro can face imprisonment for up to 10 years. Pasting posters or drawing graffiti on the walls of stations or trains is punishable by a fine of ₹1,000 or imprisonment for up to six months. Traveling in an inebriated state or creating nuisance in the train is punishable by a ₹500 fine. Passengers are monitored at security checkpoints and those that are causing trouble, heavily drunk, or carrying forbidden items are not permitted to board. Spitting on the metro premises is punishable by a fine of ₹100.

=== Mobile app ===
The BMRCL launched a Namma Metro app for Android devices in 2013. However, it had limited features. The app was officially re-launched on 4 November 2016 with additional features. The app was developed by the Centre for Development of Advanced Computing (CDAC). The app allows users to purchase and recharge smart cards, locate nearby metro stations and also provides information related to parking, train frequency, route map, and fare details.

=== WhatsApp chatbot ===
BMRCL introduced a WhatsApp chatbot named Bhagya which can provide easy recharge of smart cards, locations of nearby metro stations and information regarding train frequency and fare details.

=== Fire safety ===
Namma Metro has a dedicated fire team to take care of operations and maintenance of the firefighting system installed in metro stations. They conduct regular mock exercises and liaison with the State Fire Department for any assistance in case of fire emergency.

== In popular culture ==
Several films and commercials have been shot on the Namma Metro premises. The BMRCL charges ₹50,000 (US$530) for shooting inside a metro station, and ₹40,000 (US$430) for shoots inside a metro train during peak hours between 6 am to 10 pm. During non-peak hours, from 10 pm to 4 am, the agency charges ₹50,000 (US$530) for shoots inside metro stations and ₹20,000 (US$210) inside a train. The film producers must also make a security deposit of ₹5 lakh (US$5,300), as insurance for the metro property. Film shoots are permitted during three slots – 6 to 8 am, 12 pm to 2 pm, and 9 to 11 pm. Kannada films can avail lower rates.

The first film to shoot on Namma Metro was the Kannada blockbuster Ugramm in 2013. Later many other Kannada movies, including the 2015 film Rana Vikrama starring Puneeth Rajkumar and Adah Sharma, were shot using Namma Metro's facilities.

The 2012 Malayalam film 22 Female Kottayam, starring Fahadh Faasil and Rima Kallingal, has a song sequence shot in the Namma Metro coach.

In 2017, Kannada flim "Bharjari" starring Dhruva Sarja and Rachita Ram, the introduction scene of Rachita Ram was shot in July 2016 at Mahatma Gandhi Road Metro Station.

In December 2016, the Tamil film Imaikkaa Nodigal, starring Nayanthara, became the first film to shoot scenes inside the tunnel stretch of the Purple Line. According to BMRC officials, prior to this film, one Kannada film, one Telugu film and several commercials had been shot on the Namma Metro premises.

In February 2017, a mobile game based on Namma Metro was released. It is called Bangalore Metro Simulator 2017, and allows users to drive on both the Purple Line and Green Line.

== Controversies ==
In August 2021, the Karnataka government requested large corporations with offices on the Outer Ring Road (ORR) to consider extending remote work policies until the end of 2022 to reduce traffic congestion during the soon-to-be initiated metro rail construction on the stretch from Silk Board to KR Puram. Due to questions raised by IT companies and employees awaiting return to their offices, the government issued a clarification that it was not mandatory.

On 10 January 2023, there was an accident when an under-construction metro pillar rebar on the ORR stretch of the Blue Line fell sideways on a motor vehicle, leading to the death of a woman (Tejaswini Sulakhe) and her child (Vihan) riding on a scooter in HBR Layout. Some officials of the BMRCL and the Nagarjuna Construction Company (with whom the BMRCL had a contract) had been booked. This has led to allegations of corruption and negligence of the civic bodies by the media. BMRCL announced a financial assistance of ₹ 20 lakh. Chief Minister Basavaraj Bommai also announced a separate compensation of Rs 10 lakh for each of the deaths from the Chief Ministers' Relief Fund.

In October 2023, a proposal was made to rename the Namma Metro after the 12th-century Kannada philosopher Basaveshwara. Many citizens urged that the original name of the metro be kept, with some telling the government to focus on other infrastructure projects in Bengaluru.

The opening of the Yellow Line was delayed to lack of trainsets. The train contract was granted to Chinese company CRRC, which struggled first to obtain clearances for a new manufacturing facility, then was unable to secure visas for Chinese engineers until December 2023 due to a downturn in China–India relations.

== See also ==
- Urban rail transit in India
- Bengaluru Suburban Railway
- Namma Metro
  - Purple Line
  - Green Line
  - Yellow Line
  - Pink Line
  - Blue Line
  - Orange Line
  - Grey Line
  - Red Line
  - Inner Ring Line
  - List of Namma Metro stations
  - Rangoli Metro Art Center
- List of metro systems
