= Srirampura metro station =

Namma Metro's Green Line metro station

Srirampura
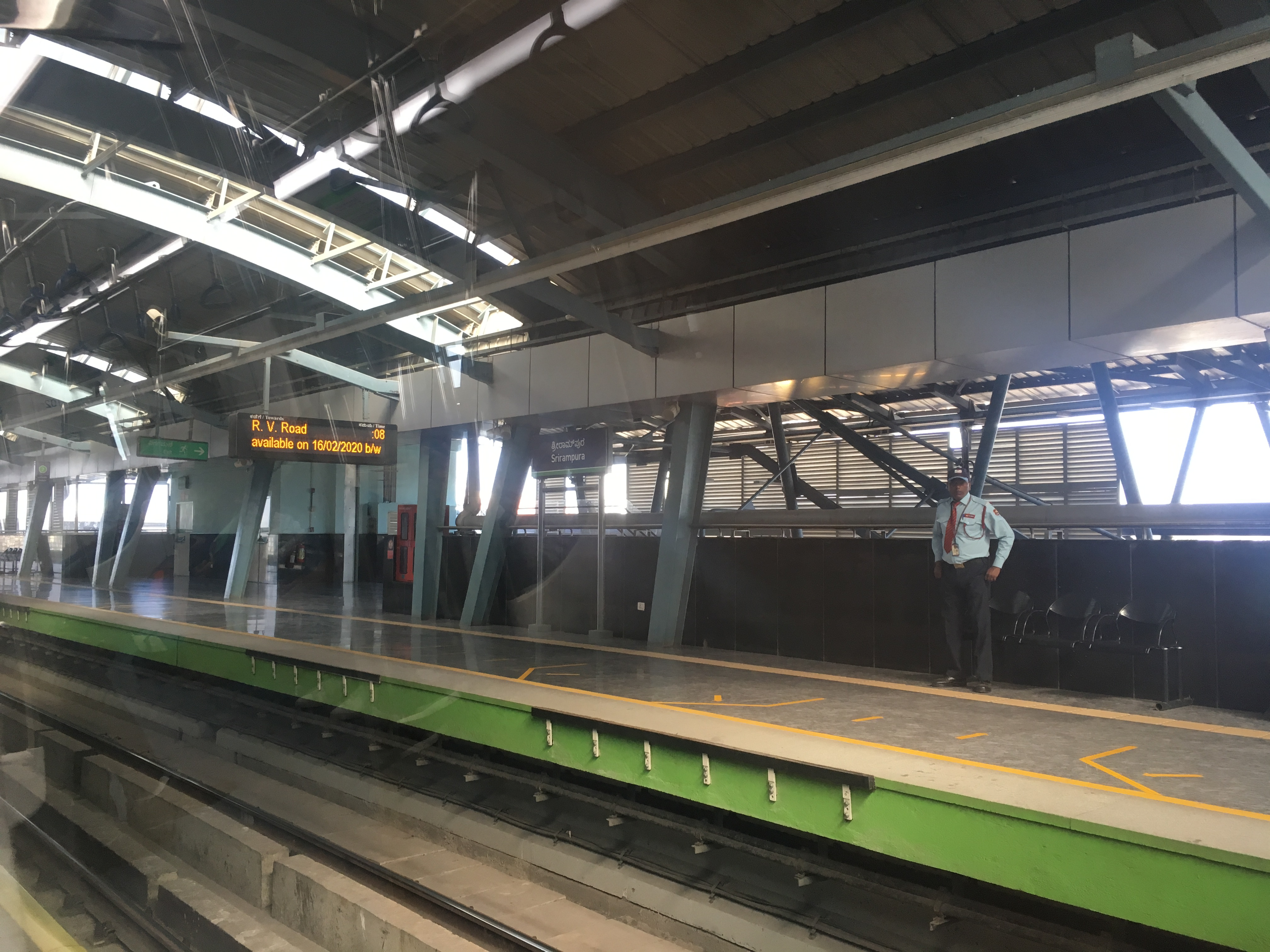

General information
- Other names: Sriramapura
- Location: Mahakavi Kuvempu Rd, Ramamohanapuram, Rajaji Nagar, Bengaluru, Karnataka 560021
- Coordinates: 12.996508°N 77.563283°E
- System: Namma Metro station
- Owner: Bangalore Metro Rail Corporation Ltd (BMRCL)
- Operator: Namma Metro
- Line: Green Line
- Platforms: Side platform Platform-1 → Madavara; Platform-2 → Silk Institute
- Tracks: 2

Construction
- Structure type: Elevated, Double track
- Platform levels: 2
- Accessible: Yes
- Architect: Punj Lloyd - Sembawang Infrastructure (India) JV

Other information
- Status: Staffed
- Station code: SPRU

History
- Opened: 1 March 2014; 12 years ago
- Electrified: 750 V DC third rail

Services
Preceding station	Namma Metro	Following station
Mahakavi Kuvempu Road towards Madavara	Green Line	Mantri Square Sampige Road towards Silk Institute
Route map
Location

Srirampura is an elevated metro station on the North-South corridor of the Green Line of Namma Metro serving the Srirampura area of Bengaluru, India. It was opened to the public on 1 March 2014.

== Station layout ==
G	Street level	Exit/Entrance
L1	Mezzanine	Fare control, station agent, Metro Card vending machines, crossover
L2	Side platform | Doors will open on the left
L2	Platform 2 Southbound	Towards → Silk Institute; Next Station: Mantri Square Sampige Road
L2	Platform 1 Northbound	Towards ← Madavara; Next Station: Mahakavi Kuvempu Road
L2	Side platform | Doors will open on the left
L2

== Entry/Exits ==
There are 3 Entry/Exit points – A, B and C. Commuters can use either of the points for their travel.

== See also ==
- Bengaluru
- List of Namma Metro stations
- Transport in Karnataka
- List of metro systems
- List of rapid transit systems in India
