= VDSA =

VDSA may refer to:

- VDSA, the ICAO airport code for Siem Reap–Angkor International Airport, Siem Reap, Cambodia
- VDSA, the Namma Metro station code for Dr. B. R. Ambedkar Station, Vidhana Soudha metro station, Bengaluru, Karnataka, India
