= Mahakavi Kuvempu Road metro station =

Namma Metro's Green Line metro station

Mahakavi Kuvempu Road
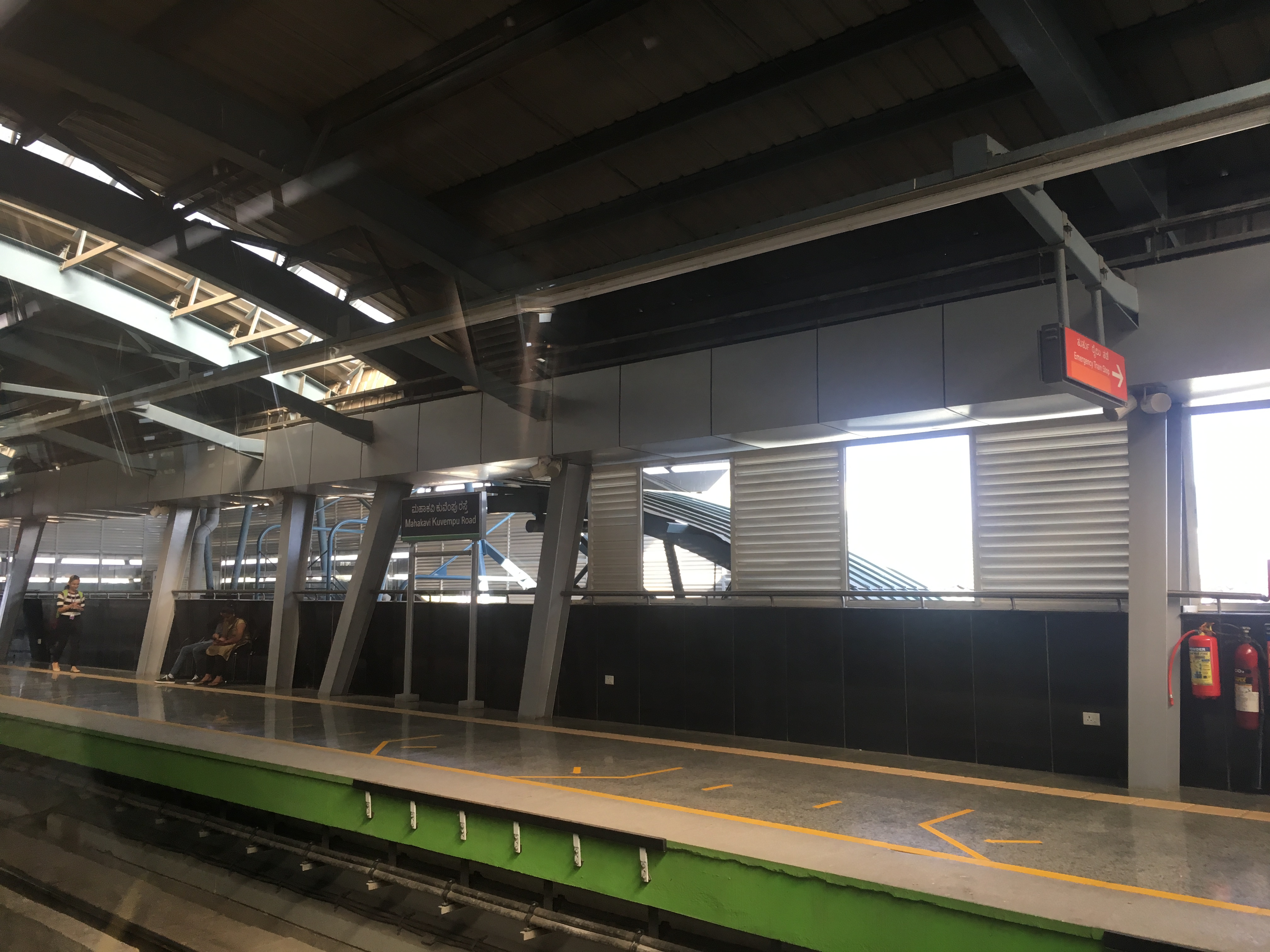

General information
- Other names: Mahakavi Kuvempu Raste, Kuvempu Road, Kuvempu Raste
- Location: Mahakavi Kuvempu Rd, Gayatrinagar, Bengaluru, Karnataka 560021
- Coordinates: 12.998456°N 77.556951°E
- System: Namma Metro station
- Owner: Bangalore Metro Rail Corporation Ltd (BMRCL)
- Operator: Namma Metro
- Line: Green Line
- Platforms: Side platform Platform-1 → Madavara; Platform-2 → Silk Institute
- Tracks: 2

Construction
- Structure type: Elevated, Double track
- Platform levels: 2
- Accessible: Yes
- Architect: Punj Lloyd - Sembawang Infrastructure (India) JV

Other information
- Status: Staffed
- Station code: KVPR

History
- Opened: 1 March 2014; 12 years ago
- Electrified: 750 V DC third rail

Services
Preceding station	Namma Metro	Following station
Rajajinagar towards Madavara	Green Line	Srirampura towards Silk Institute
Route map
Location

Mahakavi Kuvempu Road (formerly known as Kuvempu Road) is an elevated metro station on the North-South corridor of the Green Line of Namma Metro in Bengaluru, India. The station was constructed by Punj Lloyd - Sembawang Infrastructure (India) JV, and was opened to the public on 1 March 2014.

== Station layout ==
G	Street level	Exit/Entrance
L1	Mezzanine	Fare control, station agent, Metro Card vending machines, crossover
L2	Side platform | Doors will open on the left
L2	Platform 2 Southbound	Towards → Silk Institute; Next Station: Srirampura
L2	Platform 1 Northbound	Towards ← Madavara; Next Station: Rajajinagar
L2	Side platform | Doors will open on the left
L2

== Entry/Exits ==
There are 3 Entry/Exit points – A, B and C. Commuters can use either of the points for their travel.

== See also ==
- Bengaluru
- List of Namma Metro stations
- Transport in Karnataka
- List of metro systems
- List of rapid transit systems in India
