= YPM =

YPM or ypm can refer to:

- Pikangikum Airport, an airport near Pikangikum, Ontario, Canada, by IATA code
- Yeshwanthpur metro station, Bengaluru, Karnataka, India, by Namma Metro station code
- Youth Parliament of Manitoba, a charity from Manitoba, Canada
- Muji language, a language spoken in China and Vietnam, by ISO 639 code
- Peabody Museum of Natural History, the Yale Peabody Museum
