= Rajajinagar metro station =

Namma Metro's Green Line metro station

Rajajinagar
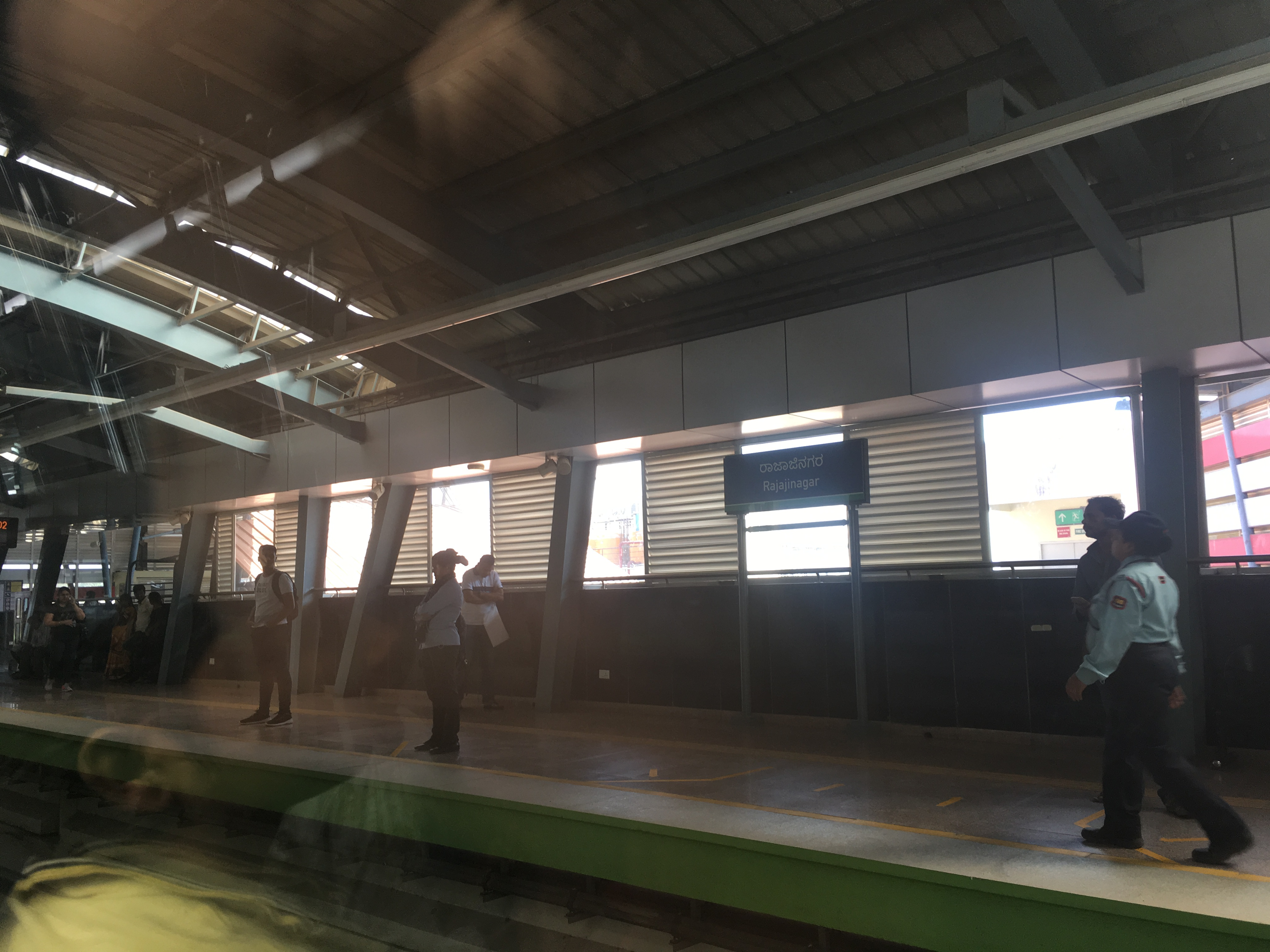

General information
- Other names: Rajajinagara
- Location: Chord Rd, West of Chord Road 2nd Stage, Nagapura, Bengaluru, Karnataka 560086
- Coordinates: 13.000334°N 77.549701°E
- System: Namma Metro station
- Owner: Bangalore Metro Rail Corporation Ltd (BMRCL)
- Operator: Namma Metro
- Line: Green Line
- Platforms: Side platform Platform-1 → Madavara; Platform-2 → Silk Institute
- Tracks: 2

Construction
- Structure type: Elevated, Double track
- Platform levels: 2
- Parking: Available
- Accessible: Yes
- Architect: Punj Lloyd - Sembawang Infrastructure (India) JV

Other information
- Status: Staffed
- Station code: RJNR

History
- Opened: 1 March 2014; 12 years ago
- Electrified: 750 V DC third rail

Services
Preceding station	Namma Metro	Following station
Mahalakshmi towards Madavara	Green Line	Mahakavi Kuvempu Road towards Silk Institute
Route map
Location

Rajajinagar is an elevated metro station on the North-South corridor of the Green Line of Namma Metro serving the Rajajinagar area of Bengaluru, India. Located close to Navrang Theatre. The station was constructed by Punj Lloyd-Sembawang Infrastructure (India) JV, and was opened to the public on 1 March 2014.

== Station layout ==
G	Street level	Exit/Entrance
L1	Mezzanine	Fare control, station agent, Metro Card vending machines, crossover
L2	Side platform | Doors will open on the left
L2	Platform 2 Southbound	Towards → Silk Institute; Next Station: Mahakavi Kuvempu Road
L2	Platform 1 Northbound	Towards ← Madavara; Next Station: Mahalakshmi
L2	Side platform | Doors will open on the left
L2

== Entry/Exits ==
There are 2 Entry/Exit points – A and B. Commuters can use either of the points for their travel.

- Entry/Exit point A: Towards Tata Motors Showroom side
- Entry/Exit point B: Towards Ananya Hospital side

== See also ==
- Bengaluru
- List of Namma Metro stations
- Transport in Karnataka
- List of metro systems
- List of rapid transit systems in India
