= Mahalakshmi metro station =

Namma Metro's Green Line metro station

Mahalakshmi
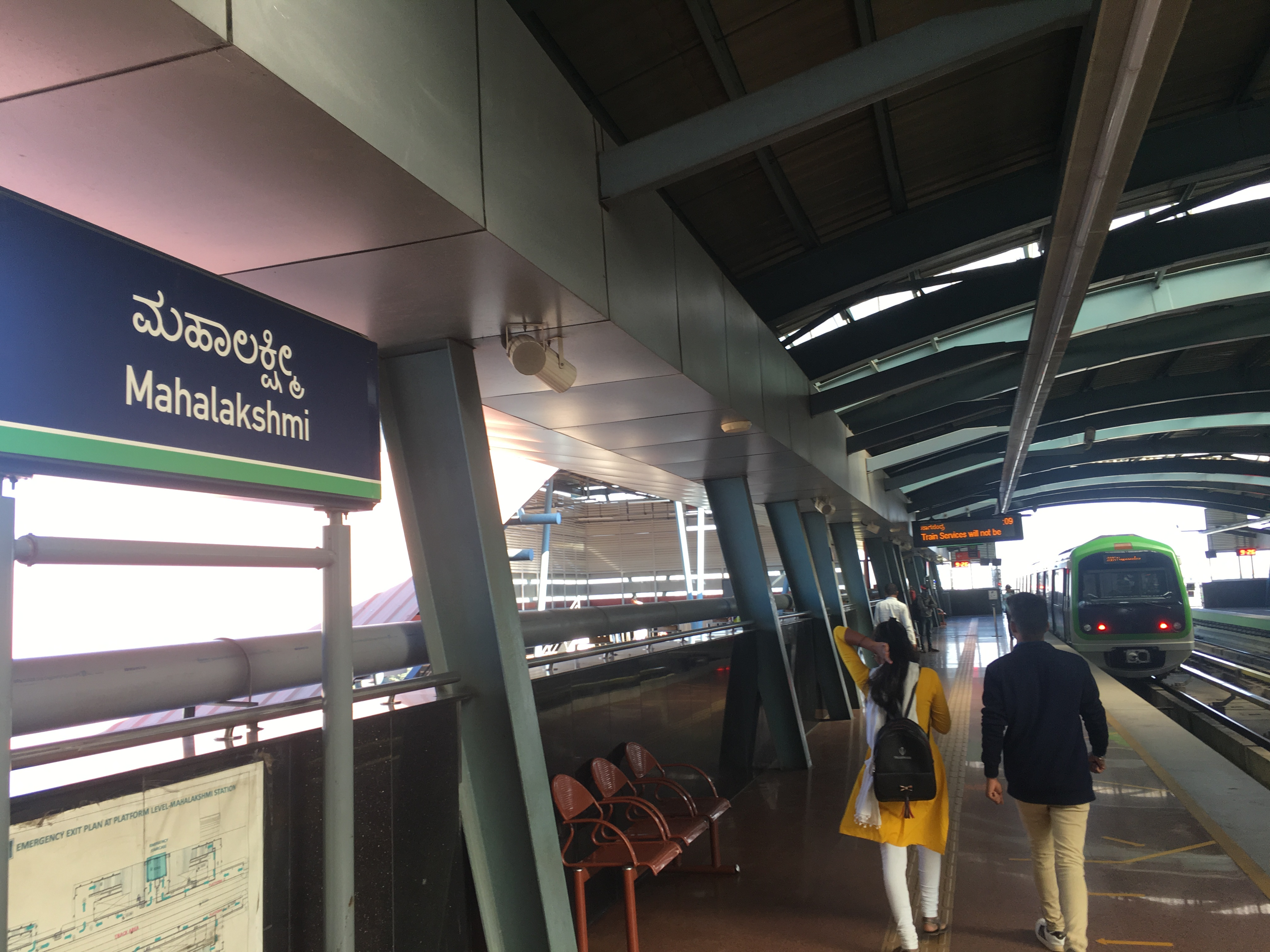

General information
- Other names: Mahalakshmi Layout
- Location: Chord Rd, Nagapura, Bengaluru, Karnataka 560086
- Coordinates: 13.008217°N 77.548821°E
- System: Namma Metro station
- Owner: Bangalore Metro Rail Corporation Ltd (BMRCL)
- Operator: Namma Metro
- Line: Green Line
- Platforms: Side platform Platform-1 → Madavara; Platform-2 → Silk Institute
- Tracks: 2

Construction
- Structure type: Elevated, Double track
- Platform levels: 2
- Accessible: Yes
- Architect: Larsen & Toubro

Other information
- Status: Staffed
- Station code: MHLI

History
- Opened: 1 March 2014; 12 years ago
- Electrified: 750 V DC third rail

Services
Preceding station	Namma Metro	Following station
Sandal Soap Factory towards Madavara	Green Line	Rajajinagar towards Silk Institute
Route map
Location

Mahalakshmi is an elevated metro station on the North-South corridor of the Green Line of Namma Metro serving Mahalakshmi Layout, ISKCON temple and surrounding areas in Bengaluru, India. It was opened to the public on 1 March 2014.

== Station layout ==
G	Street level	Exit/Entrance
L1	Mezzanine	Fare control, station agent, Metro Card vending machines, crossover
L2	Side platform | Doors will open on the left
L2	Platform 2 Southbound	Towards → Silk Institute; Next Station: Rajajinagar
L2	Platform 1 Northbound	Towards ← Madavara; Next Station: Sandal Soap Factory
L2	Side platform | Doors will open on the left
L2

== Entry/Exits ==
There are 3 Entry/Exit points – A, B and C. Commuters can use either of the points for their travel.

- Entry/Exit point A: Towards Srinivasa Temple side
- Entry/Exit point B: Towards KG Ground side
- Entry/Exit point C: Towards ISKCON Temple side

== See also ==
- Bengaluru
- List of Namma Metro stations
- Transport in Karnataka
- List of metro systems
- List of rapid transit systems in India
