= Cubbon Park metro station =

Namma Metro's Purple Line metro station

Cubbon Park
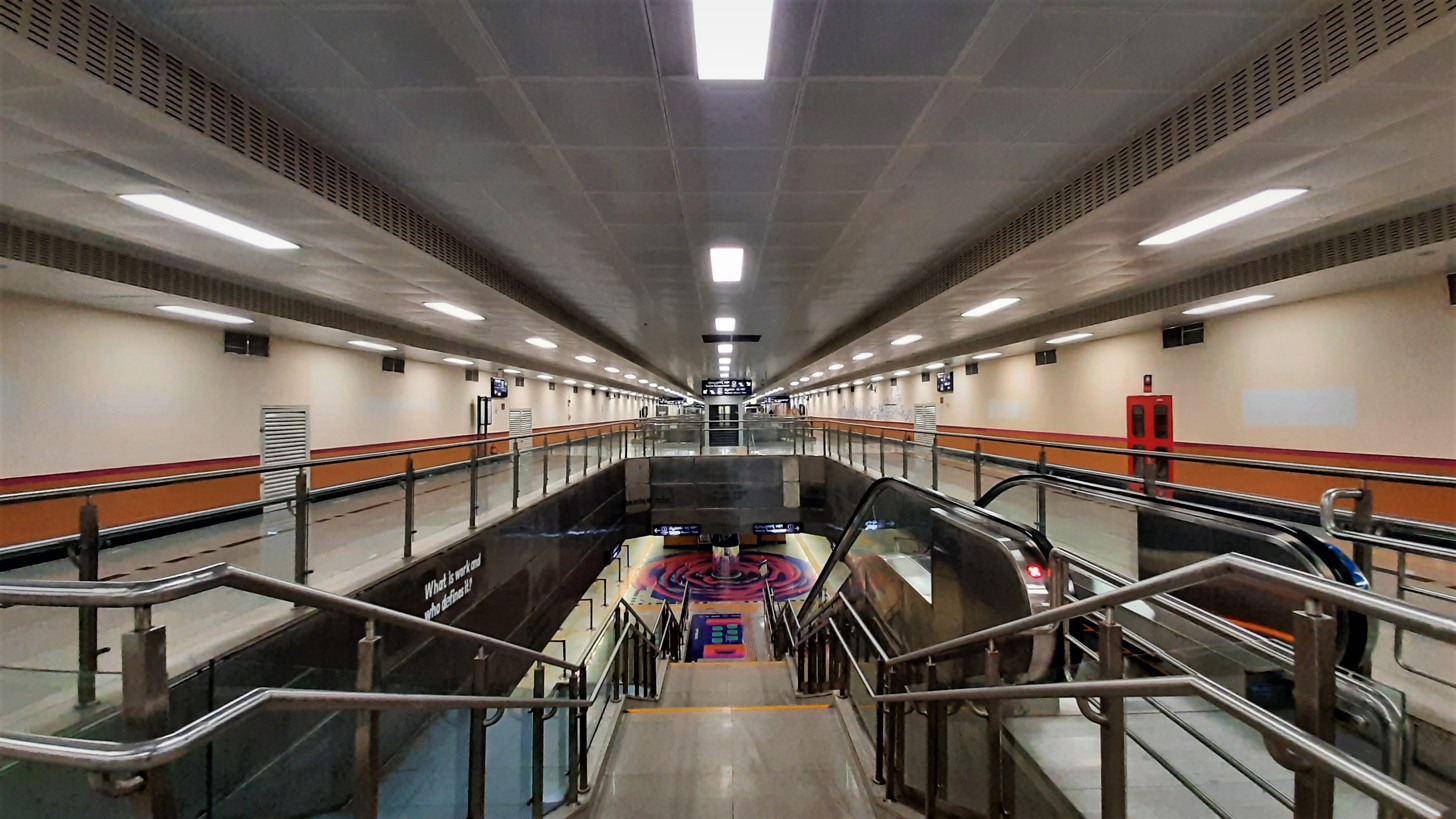
- First level of the interior, after the ticket turnstiles. The platform level is seen at the foot of the stairs.

General information
- Other names: Sri Chamarajendra Park, Cricket Stadium
- Location: Ambedkar Veedhi, Sampangi Rama Nagar, Bengaluru, Karnataka 560001; India
- Coordinates: 12.981095°N 77.596860°E
- System: Namma Metro station
- Owner: Bangalore Metro Rail Corporation Ltd (BMRCL)
- Operator: Namma Metro
- Line: Purple Line
- Platforms: Island platform Platform-1 → Whitefield (Kadugodi); Platform-2 → Challaghatta
- Tracks: 2

Construction
- Structure type: Underground
- Platform levels: 2
- Accessible: Yes
- Architect: CEC - Soma - CICI JV

Other information
- Station code: CBPK

History
- Opened: 30 April 2016; 10 years ago
- Electrified: 750 V DC third rail

Services
Preceding station	Namma Metro	Following station
Mahatma Gandhi Road towards Whitefield (Kadugodi)	Purple Line	Dr. B.R. Ambedkar Station, Vidhana Soudha towards Challaghatta
Route map
Location

Cubbon Park is an underground metro station on the East-West corridor of the Purple Line of Namma Metro in Bengaluru, India. It was opened to the public on 30 April 2016. The station is located a few metres away from one of the entrances to Cubbon Park.

== History ==
The Cubbon Park metro station, like all other underground stations on the Purple Line, was built using the cut-and-cover method.

There was a proposal to build a 35 km line known as Bangalore High-Speed Rail Link, from Cubbon Road to the Bengaluru International Airport in Devanahalli, according to BMRCL sources. This proposal was later shelved.

=== Art ===
Cubbon Park permits artists and students to showcase their work at the station under a project called "Art in Transit". An art installation by Prathmi Mehta, a student of Srishti Institute of Art, Design and Technology, features a board with the question, "What makes Bangalore?" in English and Kannada. The board instructs the viewer to pick up a thread from the tray next to board, and place it on one of 36 options on the board, of which Cubbon Park was one of the three most popular in April 2017.

== Station layout ==
G	Street level	Exit/ Entrance
M	Mezzanine	Fare control, station agent, Ticket/token, shops
P	Platform 1 Eastbound	Towards → Whitefield (Kadugodi); Next station: Mahatma Gandhi Road; Change at the next station for Pink Line
P	Island platform | Doors will open on the right
P	Platform 2 Westbound	Towards ← Challaghatta; Next station: Dr. B.R. Ambedkar Station, Vidhana Soudha

== See also ==
- Bangalore
- Cubbon Park
- List of Namma Metro stations
- Transport in Karnataka
- List of metro systems
- List of rapid transit systems in India
- Bangalore Metropolitan Transport Corporation
