= Mantri Square =

Mantri Square Mall
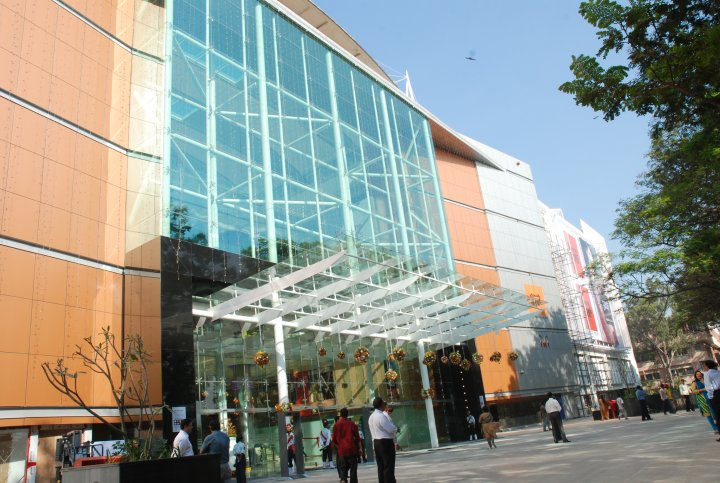
- Location: Bangalore, Karnataka, India
- Coordinates: 12°59′32.1″N 77°34′13.2″E
- Address: 1, Sampige Road, Malleswaram
- Opened: 2010
- Developer: Mantri Developers
- Num. of stores: 252
- Num. of anchor tenants: 6
- Floor area: 1,000,000 sq ft (93,000 m^{2})
- Floors: 3
- Parking: 1800 car parks; 550 two wheelers
- Public transit: Green at Mantri Square Sampige road
- Website: mantrisquare.com

Mantri Square (Kannada: ಮಂತ್ರಿ ಚೌಕ) is a shopping mall situated in the Malleswaram locality in Bangalore, Karnataka, India. Mantri Square is one of the biggest malls in the country. It also has metro rail-connectivity with Sampige Road metro station.

== Mall facilities ==
Facilities at the Mantri Square mall are:

- Department stores
- An expansive hypermarket spread over 9,000 square feet
- Six-screen INOX multiplex
- Amoeba bowling alley and gaming centre
- Food court and dining area spread over 100,000 square feet with 39 food and beverage outlets
- Scary house and Demon Jungle is located at mantri square

It was announced in 2010 that Mantri Square would be connected by the Bangalore Metro with the rest of the city.

== Controversies ==
On 2 June 2011, Bruhat Bangalore Mahanagara Palike (BBMP), the civic authority managing the mall, demolished the compound wall and the ramp of Mantri Square on Sampige Road citing traffic congestion and widening of Sampige Road.

On 16 January 2017, the mall was temporarily closed. Concurrently BBMP withdrew the mall's occupancy certificate following a scaffolding collapse which had injured 2 housekeeping staff.

Regional Commissioner has ruled that the land belongs to the BBMP and directed the civic body to take possession of the land.

== Gallery ==
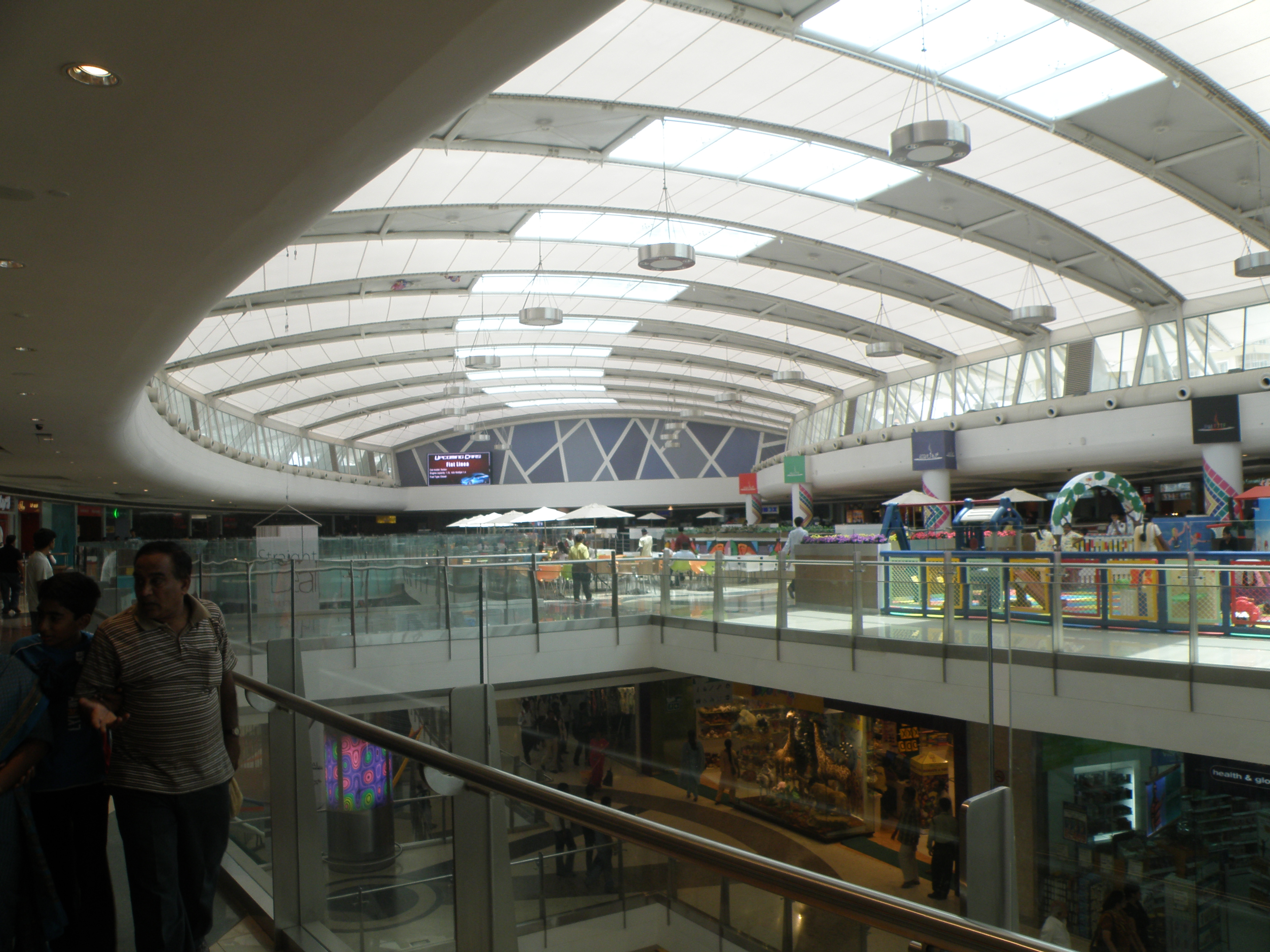
Mantri Square top floor

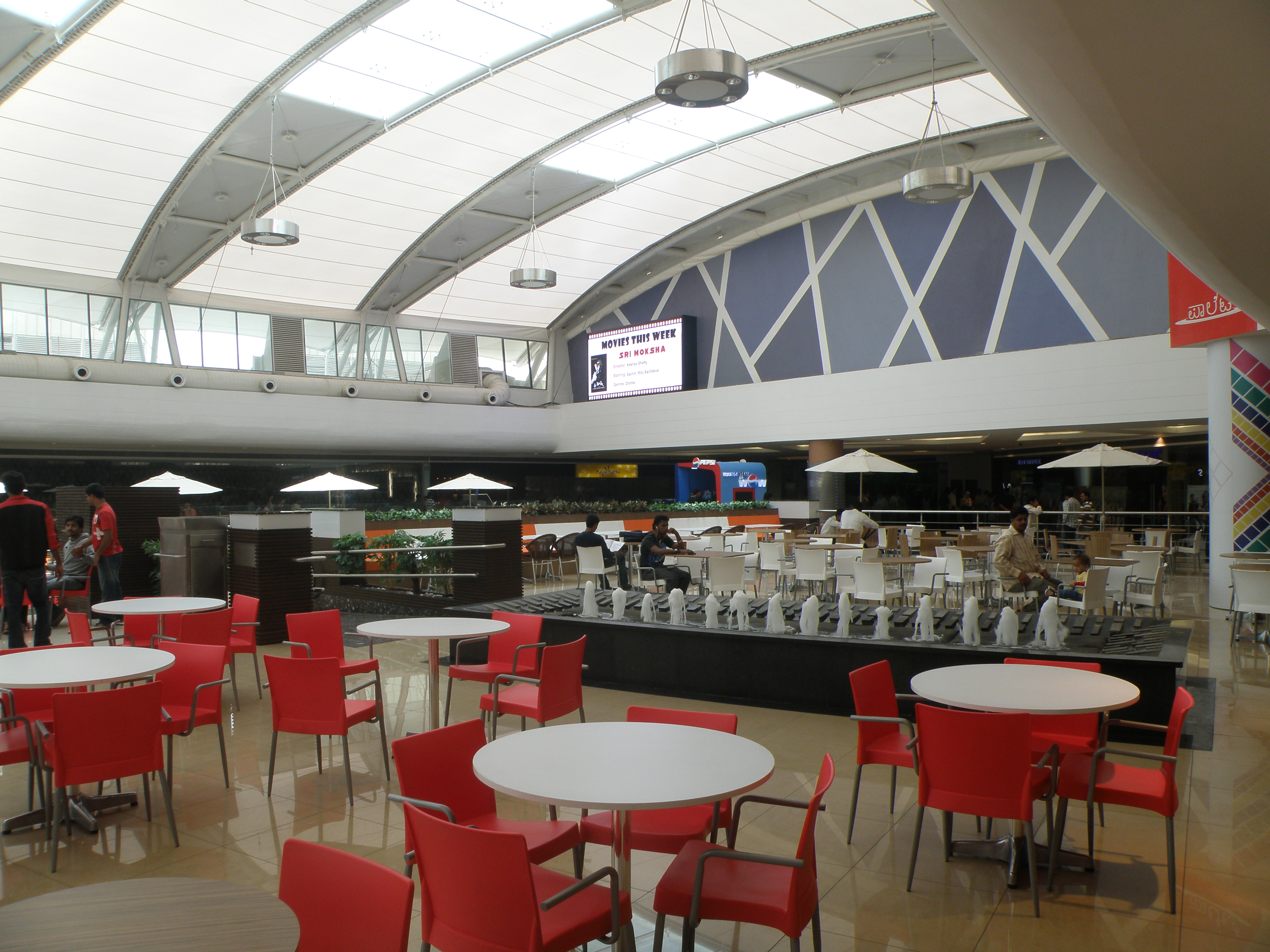
Mantri Square Food court seating

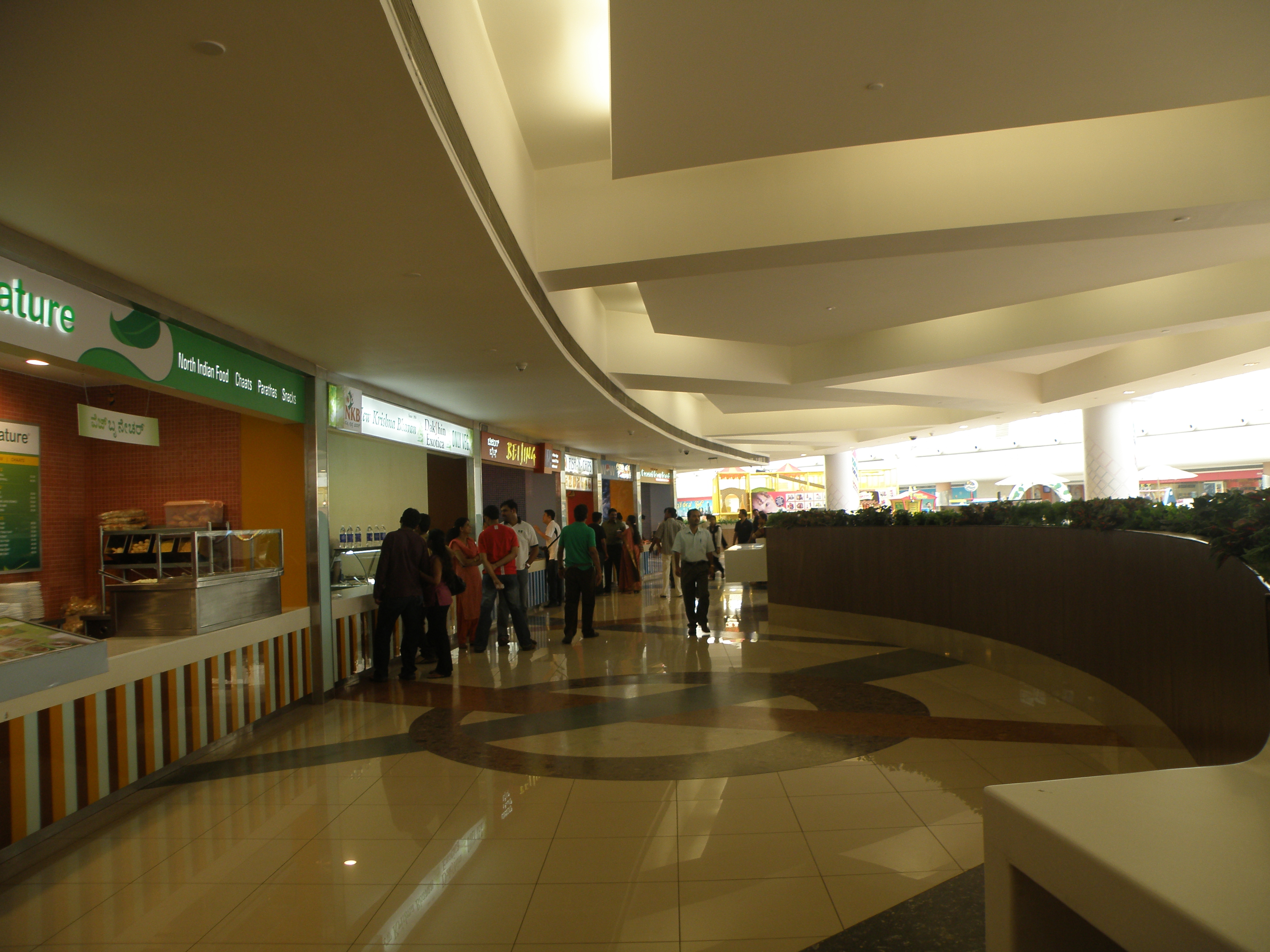
Mantri Square food court stalls

== See also ==
- Sampige Road metro station
- List of shopping malls in India
