= Sir M. Visveshwaraya station, Central College metro station =

Namma Metro's Purple Line metro station

Sir M. Visvesvaraya Stn., Central College
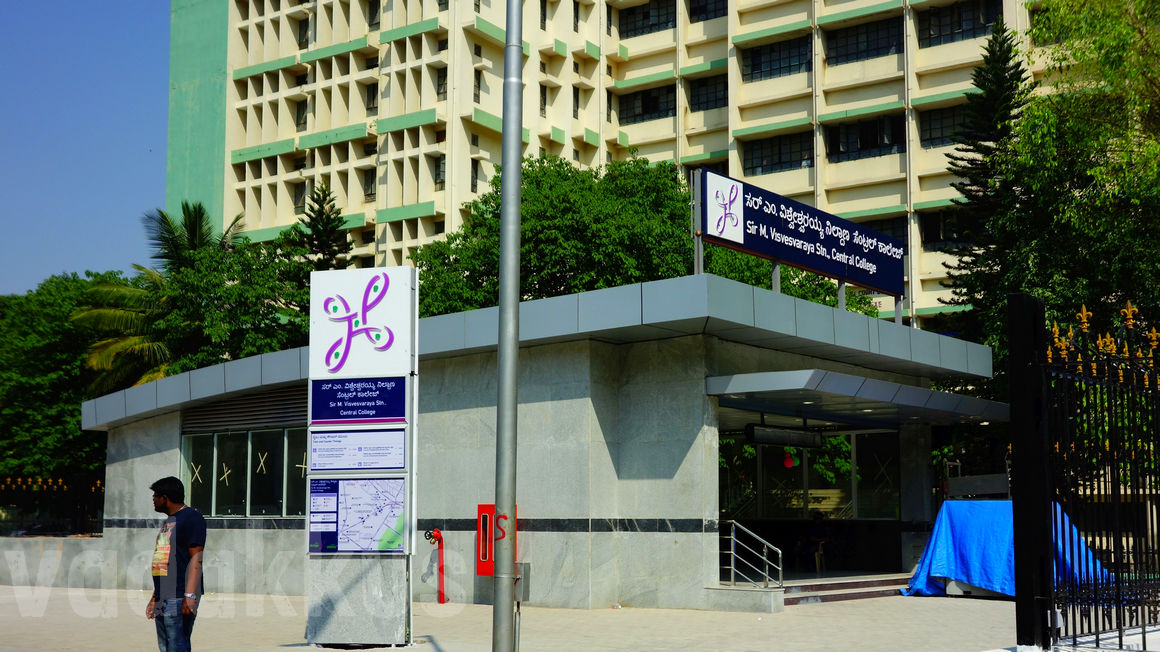
- Entrance View

General information
- Location: Post Office Rd, Ambedkar Veedhi, Sampangi Rama Nagar, Bengaluru, Karnataka 560009
- Coordinates: 12.974104°N 77.584017°E
- System: Namma Metro station
- Owner: Bangalore Metro Rail Corporation Ltd (BMRCL)
- Operator: Namma Metro
- Line: Purple Line
- Platforms: Island platform Platform-1 → Whitefield (Kadugodi); Platform-2 → Challaghatta
- Tracks: 2

Construction
- Structure type: Underground
- Depth: 60 ft (18 m)
- Platform levels: 2
- Accessible: Yes
- Architect: CEC - Soma - CICI JV

Other information
- Status: Staffed
- Station code: VSWA

History
- Opened: 30 April 2016; 10 years ago
- Electrified: 750 V DC third rail

Services
Preceding station	Namma Metro	Following station
Dr. B.R. Ambedkar Station, Vidhana Soudha towards Whitefield (Kadugodi)	Purple Line	Nadaprabhu Kempegowda station, Majestic towards Challaghatta
Route map
Location

Sir M. Visvesvaraya Stn., Central College is an underground metro station on the East-West corridor of the Purple Line of Namma Metro in Bengaluru, India. This metro station was opened to the public on 30 April 2016.

The station acquires its name from the nearby University Visvesvaraya College of Engineering (UVCE), which had been named after M. Visvesvaraya, an Indian engineer, scholar, statesman and the Diwan of Mysore from 1912 to 1918.

The station provides connectivity to the City Civil Court Complex, the Cauvery Bhavan bus stop, and various departments of Bengaluru City University in addition to UVCE.

== History ==
The Sir M. Visvesvaraya metro station, like all other underground stations on the Purple Line, was built using the cut-and-cover method. The station is located at a depth of 60 feet. Authorities carried out 1,200 controlled blasts to dig through the tough rock structure.

== Station layout ==
G	Street level	Exit/Entrance
M	Mezzanine	Fare control, station agent, Ticket/token, shops
P	Platform 1 Eastbound	Towards → Whitefield (Kadugodi); Next station: Dr. B.R. Ambedkar Station, Vidhana Soudha
P	Island platform | Doors will open on the right
P	Platform 2 Westbound	Towards ← Challaghatta; Next station: Nadaprabhu Kempegowda station, Majestic; Change at the next station for Green Line

== Entry/Exits ==
There are 5 Entry/Exit points – A, B, C, D and E. All entry and exit points are located on Post Office Road. Commuters can use either of the points for their travel.

== See also ==
- Bangalore
- List of Namma Metro stations
- Transport in Karnataka
- List of metro systems
- List of rapid transit systems in India
- Bangalore Metropolitan Transport Corporation
