= Sandal Soap Factory metro station =

Namma Metro's Green Line metro station

Sandal Soap Factory
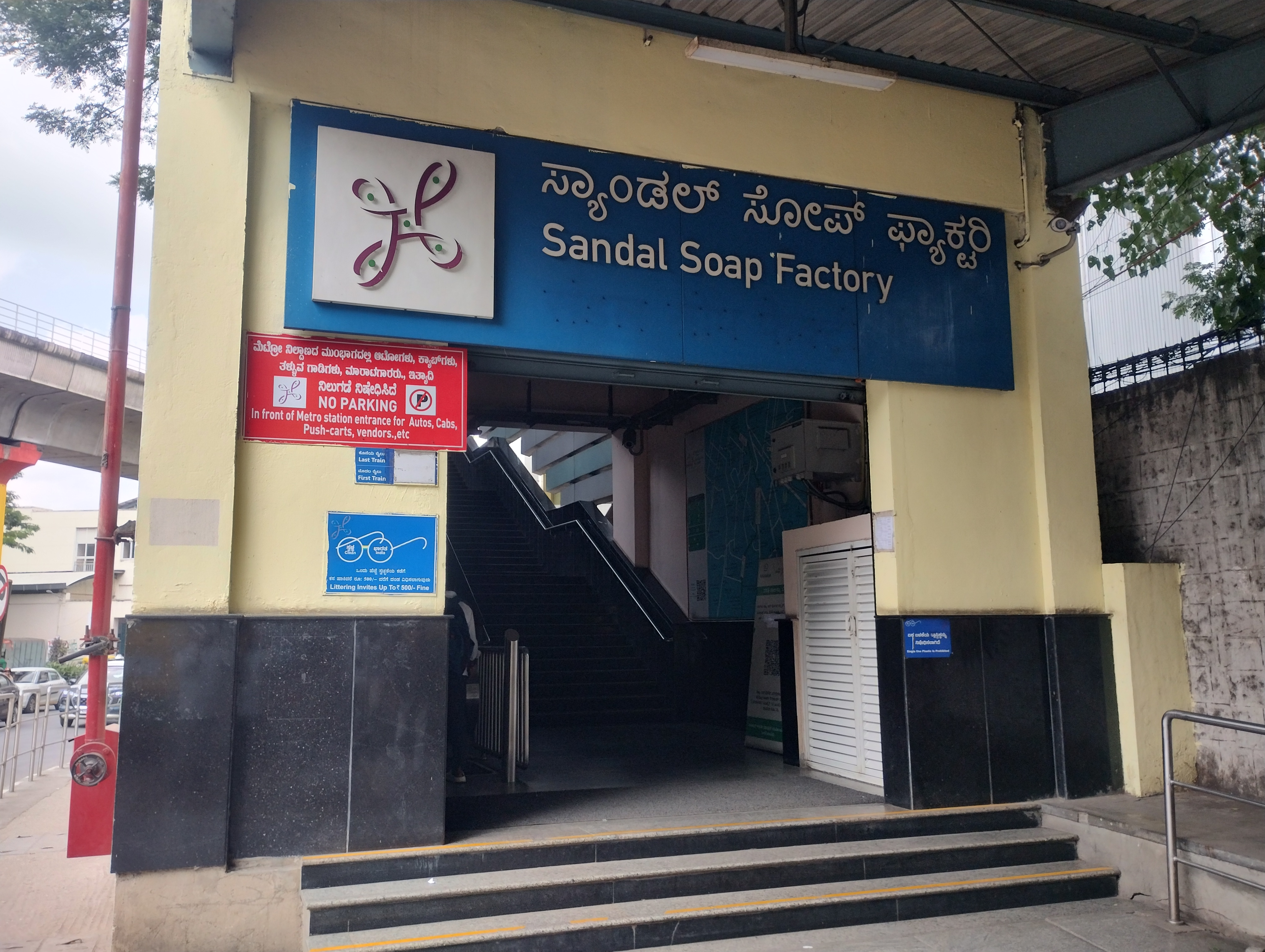
- Entrance of the station

General information
- Other names: Orion Mall, ISKON Temple, Yeshwanthapura TTMC, Soap Factory, Mysore Sandal Factory
- Location: Yeshwanthpur Industrial Suburb, Mahalakshmi Layout, Bengaluru, Karnataka 560086
- Coordinates: 13.014707°N 77.553962°E
- System: Namma Metro station
- Owner: Bangalore Metro Rail Corporation Ltd (BMRCL)
- Operator: Namma Metro
- Line: Green Line
- Platforms: Side platform Platform-1 → Madavara; Platform-2 → Silk Institute
- Tracks: 2
- Connections: Yeshwanthpura TTMC

Construction
- Structure type: Elevated, Double track
- Platform levels: 2
- Parking: Available
- Accessible: Yes
- Architect: Larsen & Toubro

Other information
- Status: Staffed
- Station code: SSFY

History
- Opened: 1 March 2014; 12 years ago
- Electrified: 750 V DC third rail

Services
Preceding station	Namma Metro	Following station
Yeshwanthpur towards Madavara	Green Line	Mahalakshmi towards Silk Institute
Route map
Location

Sandal Soap Factory is an elevated metro station on the North-South corridor of the Green Line of Namma Metro serving the nearby Orion Mall area of Bengaluru, India. It acquires its name from the factory of the Karnataka Soaps and Detergents Limited situated nearby. It was opened to the public on 1 March 2014.

== Station layout ==
G	Street level	Exit/Entrance
L1	Mezzanine	Fare control, station agent, Metro Card vending machines, crossover
L2	Side platform | Doors will open on the left
L2	Platform 2 Southbound	Towards → Silk Institute; Next Station: Mahalakshmi
L2	Platform 1 Northbound	Towards ← Madavara; Next Station: Yeshwanthpur
L2	Side platform | Doors will open on the left
L2

== See also ==
- Bengaluru
- List of Namma Metro stations
- Transport in Karnataka
- List of metro systems
- Mysore Sandal Soap
- List of rapid transit systems in India
