= Goraguntepalya metro station =

Namma Metro's Green Line metro station

Goraguntepalya
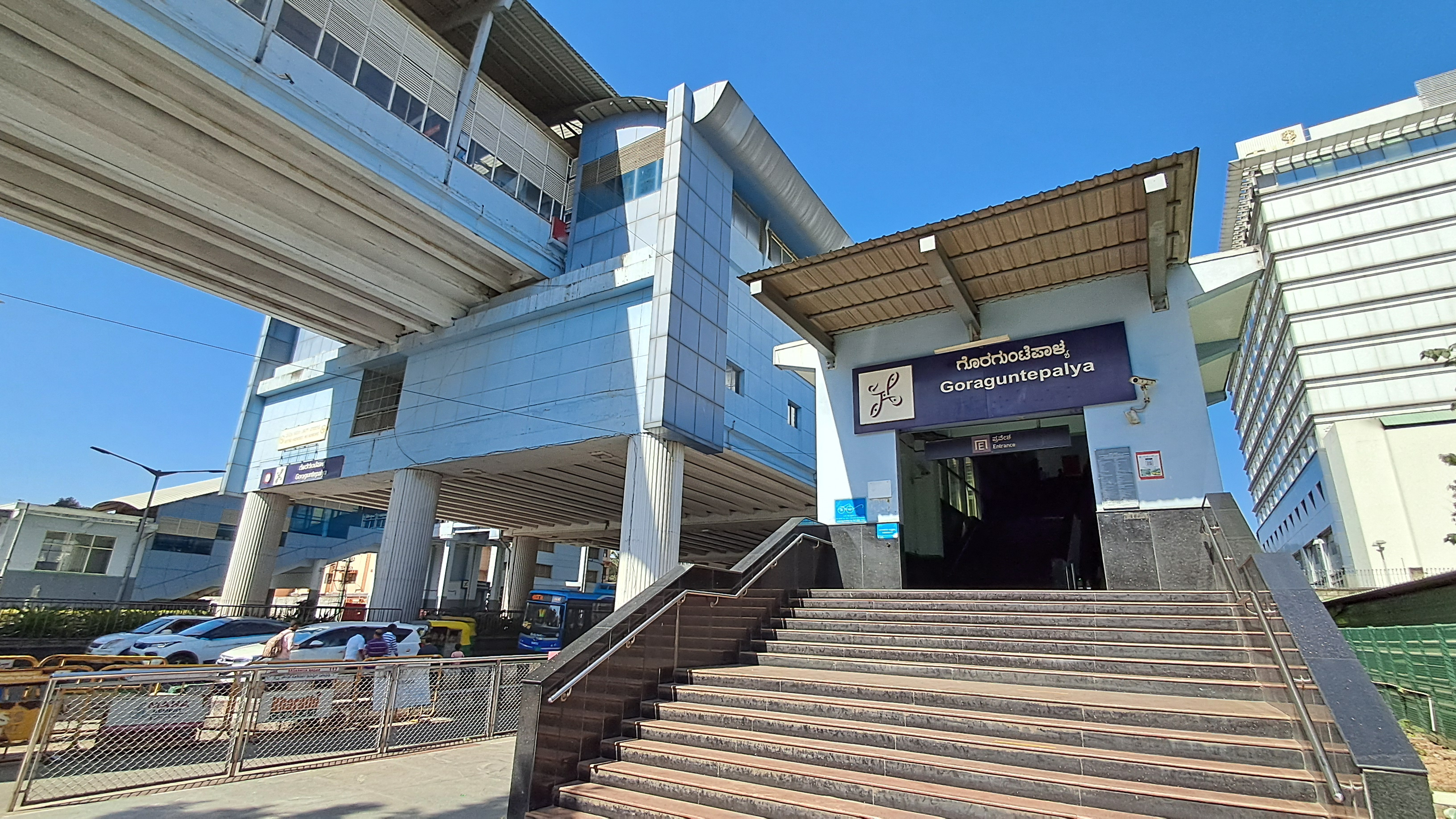
- Front Entrance of this metro station under Green Line of Namma Metro as of February 2025

General information
- Other names: Yeshwanthpur Industry
- Location: Yeshwanthpur Industrial Area, Phase 1, Yeshwanthpur, Bengaluru, Karnataka 560022
- Coordinates: 13°01′42″N 77°32′27″E
- System: Namma Metro station
- Owner: Bangalore Metro Rail Corporation Ltd (BMRCL)
- Operator: Namma Metro
- Line: Green Line
- Platforms: Side platform Platform-1 → Madavara; Platform-2 → Silk Institute
- Tracks: 2

Construction
- Structure type: Elevated, Double track
- Platform levels: 2
- Accessible: Yes
- Architect: Larsen & Toubro

Other information
- Status: Staffed
- Station code: YPI

History
- Opened: March 1, 2014; 12 years ago
- Electrified: 750 V DC third rail

Services
Preceding station	Namma Metro	Following station
Peenya towards Madavara	Green Line	Yeshwanthpur towards Silk Institute
Route map
Location

Goraguntepalya (formerly known as Yeshwanthpur Industry) is an elevated metro station on the north–south corridor of the Green Line of Namma Metro serving the area of Goraguntepalaya in Bengaluru, India. It was opened to the public on 1 March 2014 as Yeshwanthpur Industry, and was renamed as Goraguntepalya in 2016.

== Station layout ==
G	Street level	Exit/ Entrance
L1	Mezzanine	Fare control, station agent, metro card vending machines, crossover
L2	Side platform | Doors will open on the left
L2	Platform 2 Southbound	Towards → Silk Institute; Next Station: Yeshwanthpur
L2	Platform 1 Northbound	Towards ← Madavara; Next Station: Peenya Change at the next station for Orange Line **
L2	Side platform | Doors will open on the left
L2

== Entry/Exits ==
There are 5 Entry/Exit points – A, B, C, D and E. Commuters can use either of the points for their travel.

- Entry/Exit point A: Towards Goreguntapalya Bus Stop side
- Entry/Exit point B: Towards Goreguntapalya Bus Stop side with wheelchair accessibility
- Entry/Exit point C: Towards Mysore Hospital side
- Entry/Exit point D: Towards Taj Yeshwanthpur Hotel side
- Entry/Exit point E: Towards Maruti Suzuki ARENA (RNS Branch) side

== See also ==
- Bengaluru
- List of Namma Metro stations
- Transport in Karnataka
- List of metro systems
- List of rapid transit systems in India
