= Mantri Square Sampige Road metro station =

Namma Metro's Green Line metro station

Mantri Square Sampige Road
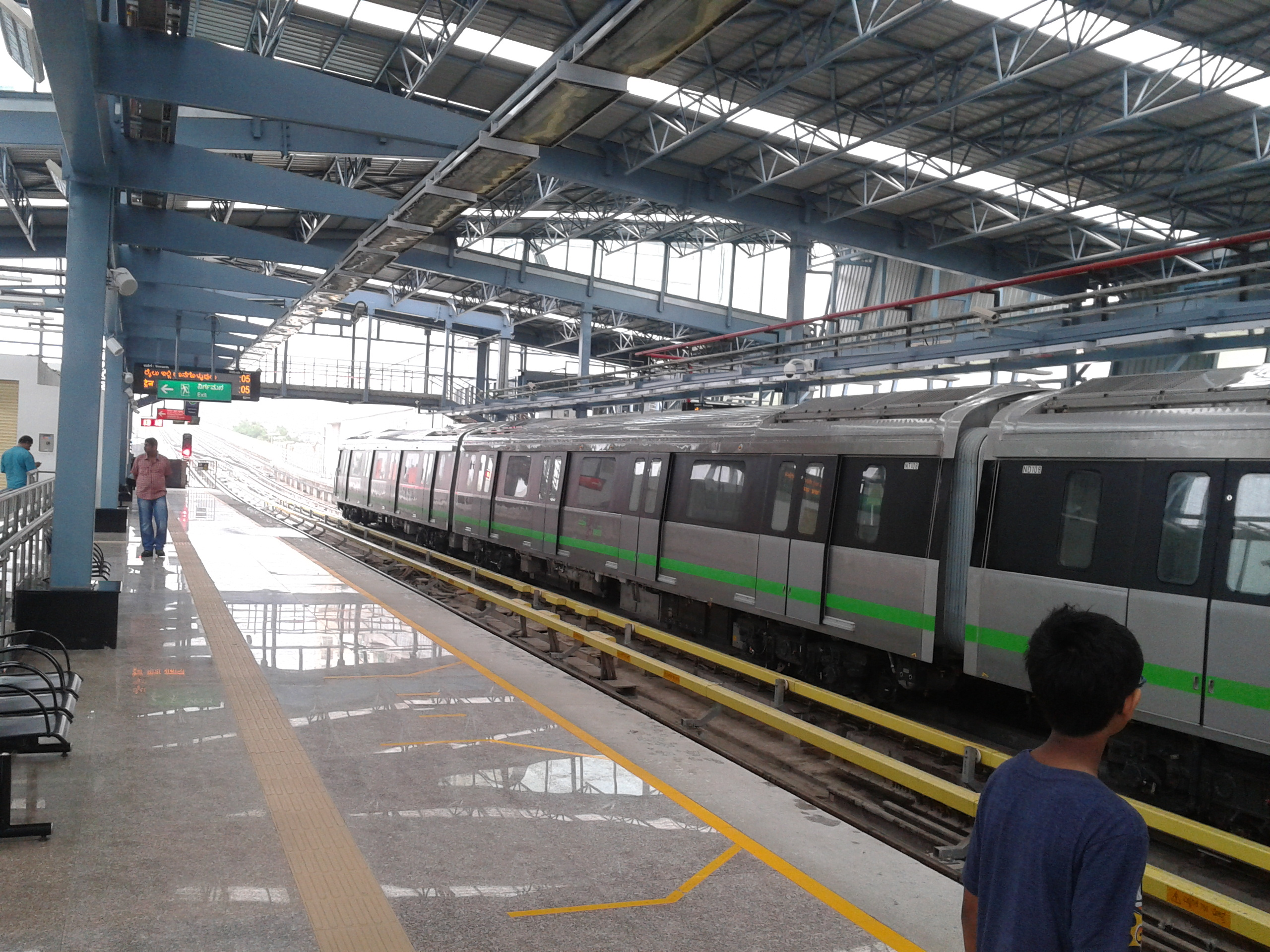
- Station platform

General information
- Other names: Sampige Road, Sampige Raste, Mantri Mall, Mantri Square Mall
- Location: Sampige Road, Malleswaram, Bangalore Karnataka 560003
- Coordinates: 12.990508°N 77.570729°E
- System: Namma Metro station
- Owner: Bangalore Metro Rail Corporation Ltd (BMRCL)
- Operator: Namma Metro
- Line: Green Line
- Platforms: Side platform Platform-1 → Madavara; Platform-2 → Silk Institute
- Tracks: 2

Construction
- Structure type: Elevated, Double track
- Platform levels: 2
- Parking: Available
- Accessible: Yes
- Architect: Mantri Developers

Other information
- Status: Staffed
- Station code: SPGD

History
- Opened: 1 March 2014; 12 years ago
- Electrified: 750 V DC third rail

Services
Preceding station	Namma Metro	Following station
Srirampura towards Madavara	Green Line	Nadaprabhu Kempegowda station, Majestic towards Silk Institute
Route map
Location

Mantri Square Sampige Road (formerly known as Sampige Road) is an important elevated metro station on the North-South corridor of the Green Line of Namma Metro serving the Malleswaram area of Bengaluru, India. It was opened to the public on 1 March 2014. The station was constructed by Mantri Developers and consists of two basements, one ground and one upper floor. The station was named Mantri Square Sampige Road due to a PPP agreement between the Bangalore Metro Rail Corporation Ltd (BMRCL) and Mantri. Mantri Square is a shopping mall located near the station.

The station area covers around 80,000 sq feet. A bridge connecting the station to the first floor of the mall was inaugurated on 20 August 2014. This was the first bridge in India directly linking a metro station with a mall.

== History ==
The BMRCL acquired 5.03 acres of land from Mantri Developers for the station in 2007. The former then entered into an agreement with Mantri for joint development of the land. As per the agreement, Mantri would construct the station at a cost of ₹30 crore and also develop the surrounding land by building about 800,000 square feet of commercial space under a 99-year lease. The Bruhat Bangalore Mahanagara Palike (BBMP) approved plans to construct a 32-storey residential complex and a 27-storey commercial complex adjacent to the Mantri Square mall and the Sampige Road station. The towers will be 112.9 metres and 100.85 metres tall respectively. The residential tower will have three basements, one ground and 32 floors, while the commercial/office tower will have three basements, one ground and 27 upper floors. The station and the two towers will occupy 1,77,885.10 square metres of land. The project is a joint venture of the BMRCL and Mantri Infrastructure Private Limited.

Mantri handed over 12,286 square metres in the acquired area for the construction of a 24-metre four-lane road for commuters. The presence of the Mantri Square mall in the area has created traffic gridlock on Sampige Road. However, traffic experts believe that the construction of the two towers will not affect the traffic flow in the area. Traffic engineering expert M.N. Sreehari stated that the 24 metre-wide road would be able to handle the traffic emanating from the towers. The project was opposed by then Gandhinagar MLA Dinesh Gundu Rao, who felt that it would benefit neither the metro nor the general public. He instead wanted the BMRCL to scrap the agreement, and construct the station on its own.

The BBMP had initially denied approval to the project when its internal probe showed that the builder had allegedly encroached on two acres and 11 guntas of government land comprising railway land, a part of Jakkarayana Kere and a mud road. The BBMP argued that the builder could receive transferable development rights (TDR) in exchange for handing over the encroached mud road to them for the construction of a road. The Survey and Settlement Department affirmed that Mantri had encroached on government land. Then BBMP commissioner Siddaiah opposed approving the plans to Mantri and the BMRCL for the construction of Swastik metro station, which was later renamed as the Mantri Square Sampige Road station. The Indian Railways had removed the encroachment from its land, following the disclosure. It is unclear whether the project was built on the encroached railway land. However, a single judge bench of the High Court, on a writ petition by Mantri, directed the BBMP to approve the plan on 15 April 2013. The BBMP's appeal against this order was disposed of by a division bench on 18 June. The court stated that Mantri could be compelled to surrender the TDR if the court [in a separate pending case] found that it had actually encroached government land. Then BBMP Commissioner M. Lakshminarayana ordered the plan be approved on 26 July, and the Joint Director (Town Planning) approved the same on 22 August 2013.

== Station layout ==
G	Street level	Exit/Entrance
L1	Mezzanine	Fare control, station agent, Metro Card vending machines, crossover
L2	Side platform | Doors will open on the left
L2	Platform 2 Southbound	Towards → Silk Institute; Next Station: Nadaprabhu Kempegowda Stn., Majestic; Change at the next station for Purple Line
L2	Platform 1 Northbound	Towards ← Madavara; Next Station: Srirampura
L2	Side platform | Doors will open on the left
L2

== Entry/Exits ==
There are 3 Entry/Exit points – A, B and C. Commuters can use either of the points for their travel.

- Entry/Exit point A: Towards PNR Nagar side
- Entry/Exit point B: Towards PNR Nagar side with wheelchair accessibility
- Entry/Exit point C: Towards Mantri Square Mall side

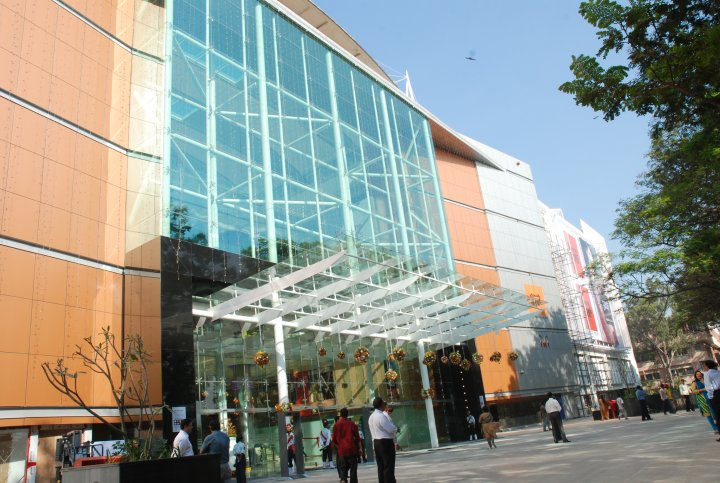
The Mantri Square mall.

== See also ==
- Bengaluru
- List of Namma Metro stations
- Transport in Karnataka
- List of metro systems
- List of rapid transit systems in India
