= Nadaprabhu Kempegowda station, Majestic =

Namma Metro's Purple & Green Line interchange station

Nadaprabhu Kempegowda Stn., Majestic
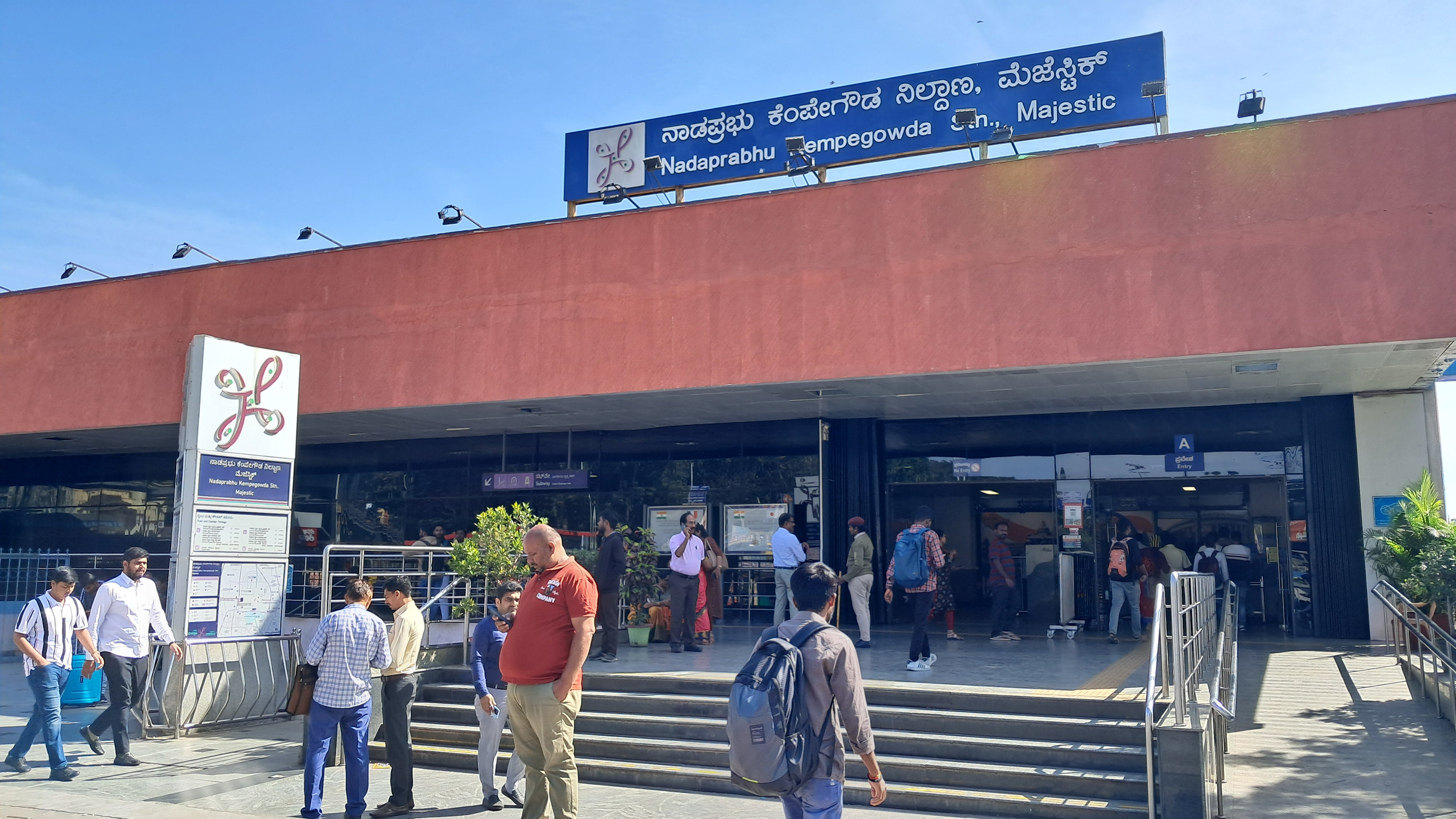
- Majestic metro station entrance 'A' on Gubbi Thotadappa Road

General information
- Other names: Majestic Metro Station
- Location: Tank Bund Rd, Bengaluru, Karnataka 560009; India
- Coordinates: 12.975692°N 77.572836°E
- System: Namma Metro
- Owner: Bangalore Metro Rail Corporation Ltd (BMRCL)
- Operator: Namma Metro
- Line: Purple Line Green Line
- Platforms: Side platform Platform-1 → Whitefield (Kadugodi); Platform-2 → Challaghatta; Island platform Platform-3 → Madavara; Platform-4 → Silk Institute
- Tracks: 4
- Connections: KSR Bengaluru; Kempegowda Bus Station

Construction
- Structure type: Underground, Double track
- Depth: 80 feet (24 m)
- Platform levels: 2
- Parking: available
- Accessible: Yes
- Architect: GYT - COASTAL JV

Other information
- Status: Staffed
- Station code: KGWA

History
- Opening: 30 April 2016 30 April 2016; 10 years ago 18 June 2017; 9 years ago
- Electrified: 750 V DC third rail

Passengers
- July 2017: 9 lakh
- Rank: 1 out of 41

Services
Preceding station	Namma Metro	Following station
Sir M. Visveshwaraya station, Central College towards Whitefield (Kadugodi)	Purple Line	Krantivira Sangolli Rayanna Railway Station towards Challaghatta
Mantri Square Sampige Road towards Madavara	Green Line	Chickpete towards Silk Institute
Route map
Location

Nadaprabhu Kempegowda Station, Majestic is an underground interchange metro station on the east–west corridor of the Purple Line and north–south corridor of Green Line of Namma Metro in Bengaluru, in the state of Karnataka, India. It opened to the public on 30 April 2016 as part of Namma Metro's Phase-1. This important metro station serves as the interchange station allowing passengers to transfer between these lines for ease of travel. The station is located within walking distance from BMTC & KSRTC's Kempegowda Bus Station, as also the City's Main Railway station.

== History ==
=== Construction ===
The contract to construct Majestic station was awarded to Coastal-GYT JV at a cost of ₹272 crore (US$28 million). Construction began in January 2012 and was expected to be completed in 2014, but faced delays due to the hardness of the rock to be excavated, and missed several deadlines. The delays escalated the cost to ₹500 crore (US$52 million). KSRTC, the state inter-city bus transport agency, provided BMRCL with 20 acres of land for construction of the station, slightly over half of which was returned to KSRTC after construction was completed. BMRCL paid KSRTC ₹4.6 crore (US$480,000) annually during the construction period as rent for the land. During the construction period, KSRTC incurred a loss of ₹100 crore (US$10 million) as they had to shut down bus services in the area.

BMRCL employed 2,240 engineers, construction workers and others to build the station. Majestic station (and all other underground stations of Namma Metro's Phase-1) was built using the cut-and-cover method. For Majestic station, the rocks were cut by blasting and 10,000 blasts had to be conducted during excavation. BMRCL stated that it had used 300,000 cubic meters of sand (equal to the volume of six football fields) and 100,000 cubic meters of cement to build the station. The underground section of the station includes a rake interchange to transfer trains between Purple and Green Line trains and vice versa.

The station opened to the public on 30 April 2016. Green Line services commenced at the station (at one level below purple line) on 18 June 2017.

=== Structure ===
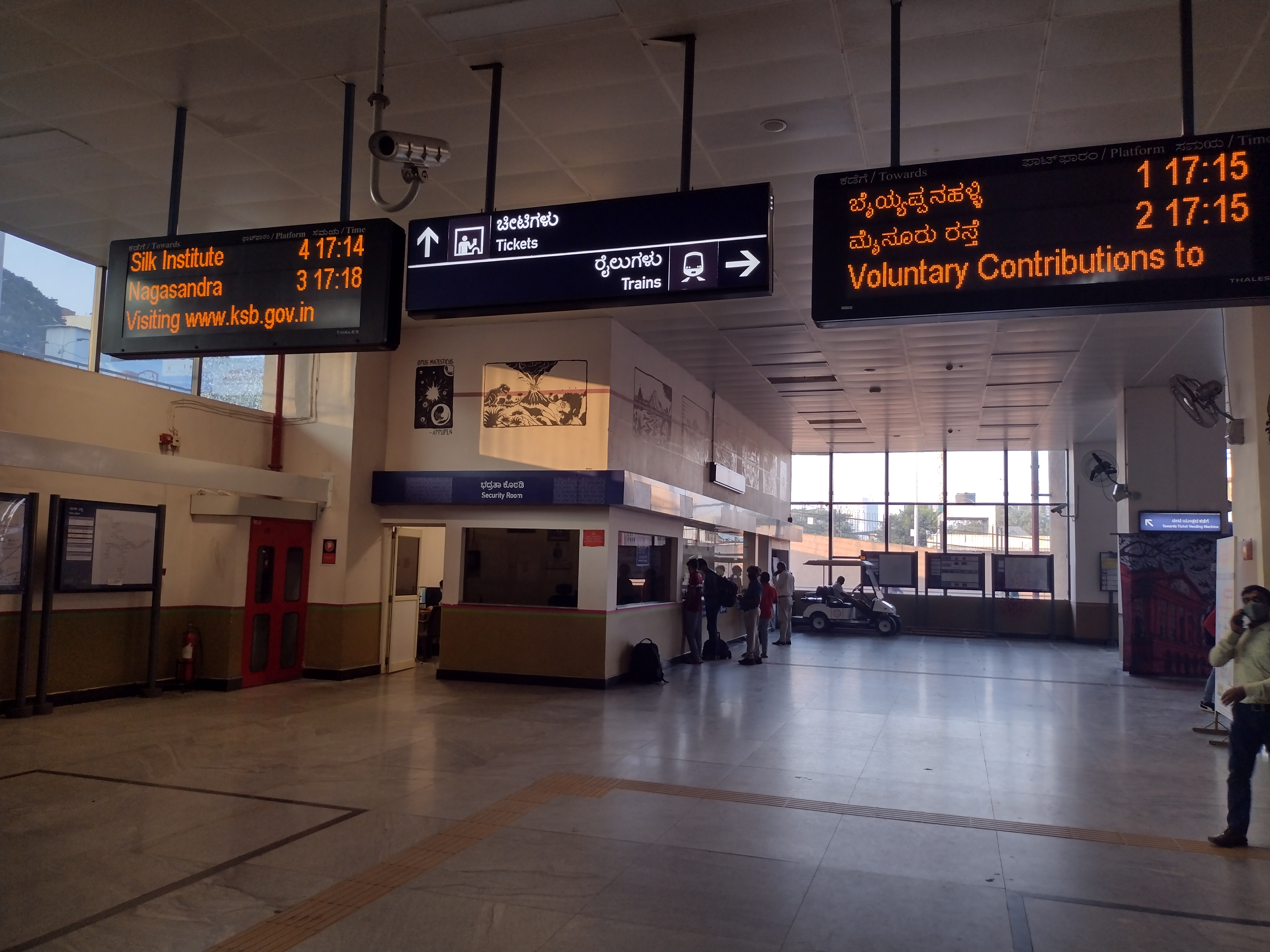
Inside the station

The station has four levels with a total floor surface area of 48,000 square meters (520,000 square feet) and is said to be the largest underground metro station in Asia. The station area covers 7 acres. Purple Line train platform is 365 metres long, Green Line train platform is 300 metres long. It has 12 staircases, 18 escape routes and 24 escalators. The station's platforms are designed to handle 20,000 commuters at any given time.

The surface level houses the entrances. There are four main entrances facing west, north-west, south and east. Pedestrian subways and sky-walks connect the station to the adjacent railway station and the bus terminals.

Ticket counters are located on a mezzanine floor. The first underground level has platforms for Purple Line trains and the second underground level has platforms for Green Line trains, perpendicular to those of the platforms for Purple Line trains.

== Passenger services ==
=== Access ===
Nadaprabhu Kempegowda Majestic Station

There are four entry/exit points – A,A1 B and C and D.

- Entry/Exit point A,A1: Towards KSR Bengaluru Railway Stn. and Kempegowda bus station Terminal 2, 2A, with wheelchair accessibility
- Entry/Exit point B: Towards Chikka Lalbagh with wheelchair accessibility
- Entry/Exit point C: Towards Upparpete Police Station / Tank Bund Road side with wheelchair accessibility
- Entry/Exit point D: Towards the walkway running through Kempegowda bus station Terminal 1 and BMTC bus station complex

A foot over bridge near the 'A' entry/exit also serves to connect the KSR city railway station on its main entrance as an alternative to using the subway connecting KSR City railway station and Kempegowda Bus station. A skywalk directly connecting Metro station with KSR Bangalore city station and Kempegowda bus station is being planned as part of KSR City railway station redevelopment.

=== Station layout ===
Surface level	Street level	Entrances and Exits
UG Level-1	Mezzanine	Fare control, station agent, Metro Card vending machines, crossover
UG Level-2	Side platform | Doors will open on the left
UG Level-2	Platform 1 Eastbound	Towards → Whitefield (Kadugodi); Next Station: Sir M. Visveshwaraya station, Central College
UG Level-2	Platform 2 Westbound	Towards ← Challaghatta; Next Station: Krantivira Sangolli Rayanna Railway Station
UG Level-2	Side platform | Doors will open on the left
UG Level-3	Platform 4 Southbound	Towards → Silk Institute; Next Station: Chickpete
UG Level-3	Island platform | Doors will open on the right
UG Level-3	Platform 3 Northbound	Towards ← Madavara; Next Station: Mantri Square Sampige Road

=== Connections ===
- Kempegowda Bus Station
- City railway station

== See also ==
- Bengaluru
- Kempegowda Bus Station
- List of Namma Metro stations
- Transport in Karnataka
- List of metro systems
- List of rapid transit systems in India
- Bengaluru Metropolitan Transport Corporation
- List of things named after Kempe Gowda I
