= Chickpete metro station =

Metro station in Bengaluru, India

Chickpete
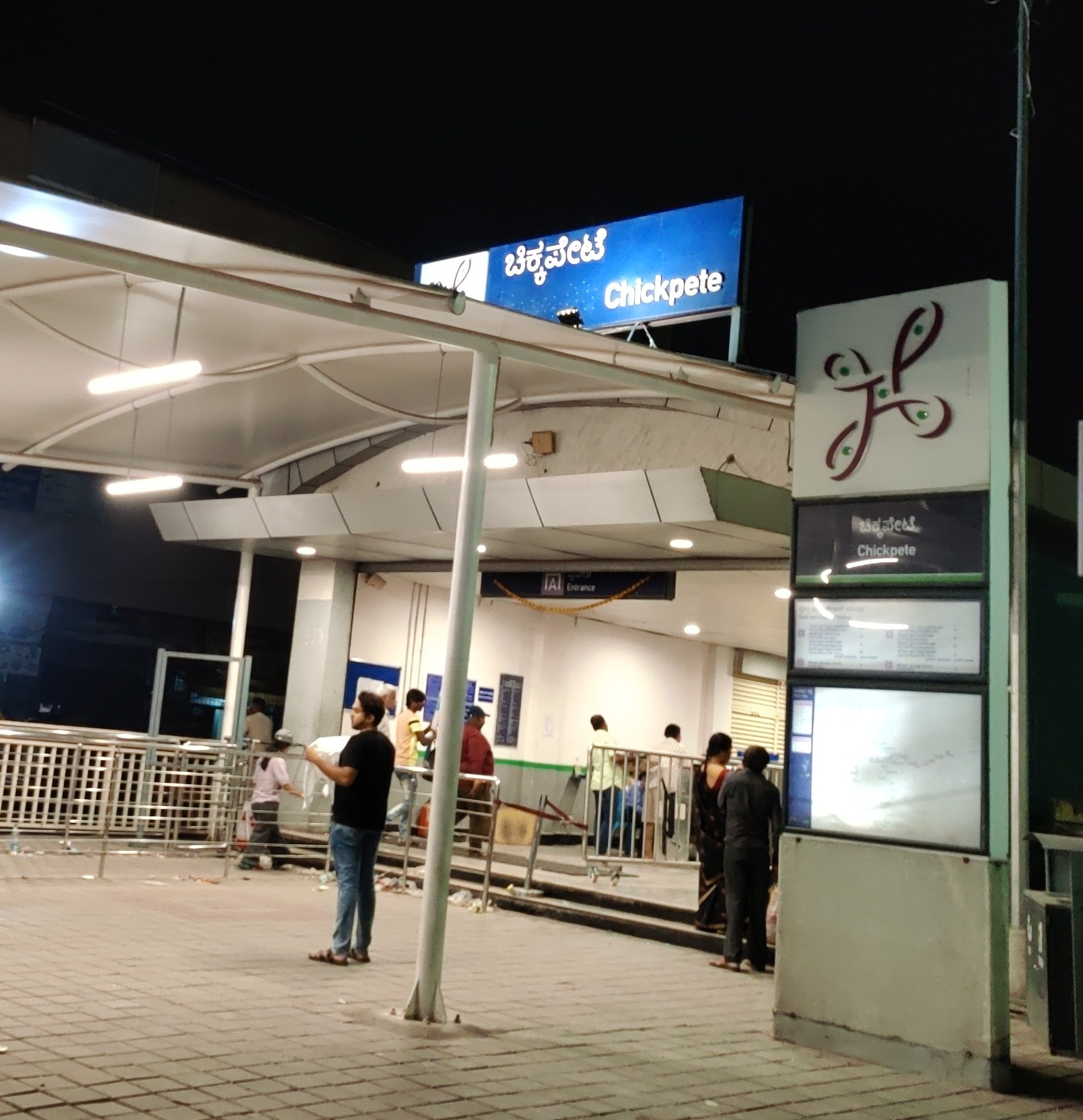
- Chickpete metro station

General information
- Other names: Chikkapete, Chickpet
- Location: BVK Iyengar Rd, Old Tharagupete, Mamulpete, Sultanpete, Bengaluru, Karnataka 560053
- Coordinates: 12.966759°N 77.574782°E
- System: Namma Metro station
- Owner: Bangalore Metro Rail Corporation Ltd (BMRCL)
- Operator: Namma Metro
- Line: Green Line
- Platforms: Island platform Platform-1 → Madavara; Platform-2 → Silk Institute
- Tracks: 2

Construction
- Structure type: Underground, Double track
- Platform levels: 2
- Parking: Yes
- Accessible: Yes
- Architect: COASTAL - TTS JV

Other information
- Status: Staffed
- Station code: CKPE

History
- Opened: 18 June 2017; 9 years ago
- Electrified: 750 V DC third rail

Services
Preceding station	Namma Metro	Following station
Nadaprabhu Kempegowda station, Majestic towards Madavara	Green Line	Krishna Rajendra Market towards Silk Institute
Route map
Location

Chickpete is an underground metro station on the north–south corridor of the Green Line of Namma Metro in Bengaluru, India. It is part of the Phase I of Namma Metro project. It was opened to the public on 18 June 2017.

== Station layout ==
G	Street Level	Exit/ Entrance
M	Mezzanine	Fare control, station agent, Ticket/token, shops
P	Platform 2 Southbound	Towards → Silk Institute; Next Station: Krishna Rajendra Market
P	Island platform | Doors will open on the right
P	Platform 1 Northbound	Towards ← Madavara; Next Station: Nadaprabhu Kempegowda station, Majestic; Change at the next station for Purple Line

== Entry/Exits ==
There are 4 Entry/Exit points – A, B, C and D. Commuters can use either of the points for their travel.

- Entry/Exit point A:- Towards Manivartapete (Sultanpete) side
- Entry/Exit point B:- Towards KR Market side
- Entry/Exit point C:- Towards Sultanpete side
- Entry/Exit point D:- Towards Manivartapete side

== See also ==
- Bengaluru
- List of Namma Metro stations
- Transport in Karnataka
- List of metro systems
- List of rapid transit systems in India
