= Dr. B. R. Ambedkar Station, Vidhana Soudha metro station =

Namma Metro's Purple Line metro station

Dr. B.R. Ambedkar Station, Vidhana Soudha
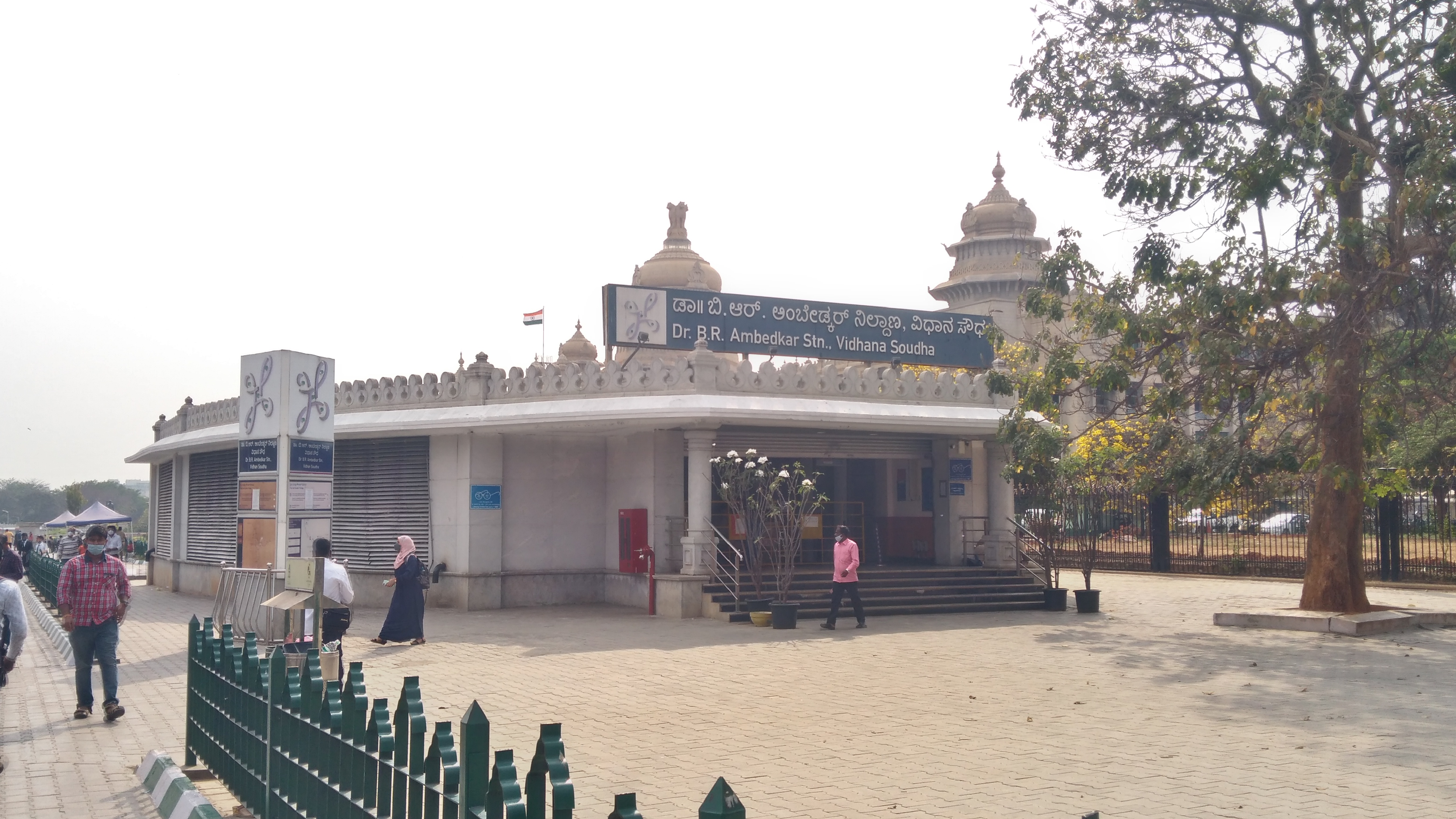
- This metro station with Vidhana Soudha behind Entrance A

General information
- Other names: Vidhana Soudha
- Location: Ambedkar Veedhi, Sampangi Rama Nagar, Bengaluru, Karnataka 560001; India
- Coordinates: 12.979823°N 77.592745°E
- System: Namma Metro station
- Owner: Bangalore Metro Rail Corporation Ltd (BMRCL)
- Operator: Namma Metro
- Line: Purple Line
- Platforms: Island platform Platform-1 → Whitefield (Kadugodi); Platform-2 → Challaghatta
- Tracks: 2

Construction
- Structure type: Underground
- Depth: 4 m (13 ft)
- Platform levels: 2
- Accessible: Yes
- Architect: CEC - Soma - CICI JV

Other information
- Station code: VDSA

History
- Opened: 30 April 2016; 10 years ago
- Electrified: 750 V DC third rail

Services
Preceding station	Namma Metro	Following station
Cubbon Park towards Whitefield (Kadugodi)	Purple Line	Sir M. Visveshwaraya station, Central College towards Challaghatta
Route map
Location

Dr. B.R. Ambedkar Station, Vidhana Soudha (formerly known as Vidhana Soudha), is an underground metro station on the East-West corridor of the Purple Line of Namma Metro. It is situated beneath B.R. Ambedkar Road, between Vidhana Soudha and Attara Kacheri, which respectively house the Karnataka Legislature and High Court in Bengaluru, India. The station was opened to the public on 30 April 2016.

== History ==
=== Construction ===
The Dr. B. R. Ambedkar station at Vidhana Soudha, like other underground stations on the Purple Line, was constructed using the cut-and-cover method. The contract for the station's construction was awarded to the CEC-Soma-CICI Joint Venture, with RITES serving as the lead consultant. Construction of the station required a total work area that was about 320 m long and 48 metres wide. A total area of 133,000 sq m (about 275 metres long and 27 metres wide) up to a depth of 18 metres had to be excavated to construct the station. The excavated soil could not be utilized in the construction process as it was mostly composed of rocky material. Instead, some of the fine quality soil obtained from the excavation at the Cubbon Park metro station, which had been stored on BRV Parade Grounds, was utilised. Fine soil was also obtained from other sources. The sand and smooth rock obtained from building tunnels was also used.

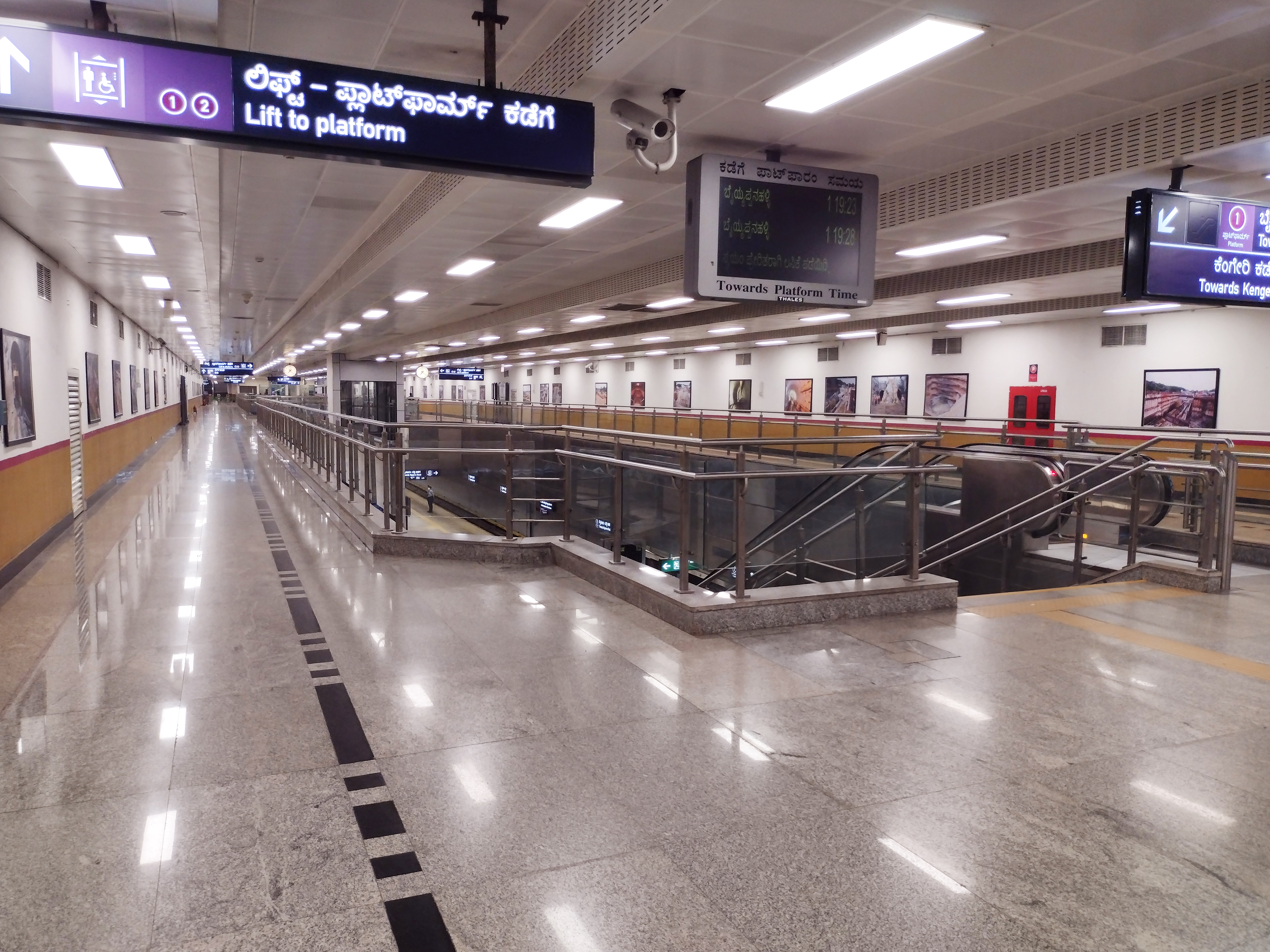
Inside station

The station box is 13 metres long and 24 metres wide, and has no pillars. The design without pillars was chosen to enable free movement of commuters without obstruction, and for aesthetic reasons. In order to achieve the column-less design, the station box was constructed with strong concrete reinforcement. Its walls have a thickness of 1 metre, the concourse slab 0.75 metres thick, and the roof slab has thickness of 1.4 metres. The thick roof slab is designed bear the load of both the station box, and the soil above it. The roof of the station is located at a depth of 4 metres below ground level. To ensure uniformity in the construction of the walls, a specially fabricated steel gantry (10 m in width and 6 m in height) was used. The entire station box is covered with 3 mm thick bituminous membrane, a waterproofing agent, to prevent surface water from leaking into the station. After the station box was constructed, it was covered with up to 4 metres of good quality red soil. The rest of the excavated site was then refilled. After construction completed, the area was restored to its previous state by re-opening the 2-lane Dr. B.R. Ambedkar Road and the lawns in front of the Vidhana Soudha and Karnataka High Court.

On 14 April 2016, the 125th birth anniversary of the jurist and social reformer B. R. Ambedkar, it was announced that the Vidhana Soudha metro station would be named after him.

== Station layout ==
G	Street level	Exit/Entrance
M	Mezzanine	Fare control, station agent, Ticket/token, shops
P	Platform 1 Eastbound	Towards → Whitefield (Kadugodi); Next station: Cubbon Park
P	Island platform | Doors will open on the right
P	Platform 2 Westbound	Towards ← Challaghatta; Next station: Sir M. Visveshwaraya station, Central College

== Entry/Exits ==
There are 6 Entry/Exit points – A, B, C, D, E and F. Commuters can use either of the points for their travel.

- Entry/Exit point A: Towards Vidhana Soudha side or towards Indian Express (Bangalore) Exit A Maps Street view
- Entry/Exit point B: Towards High Court of Karnataka side
- Entry/Exit point C: Towards High Court of Karnataka side Exit B/C Maps Street view
- Entry/Exit point D: Towards Vidhana Soudha side or towards Reserve Bank of India (Bangalore) or towards Cubbon Park side Exit D Maps Street view
- Entry/Exit points E and F: Towards Vikasa Soudha side Exit E Maps Street view

== See also ==
- Bangalore
- List of Namma Metro stations
- Transport in Karnataka
- List of metro systems
- List of rapid transit systems in India
- Bangalore Metropolitan Transport Corporation
