= Yeshwanthpur metro station =

Namma Metro's Green Line metro station

Yeshwanthpur
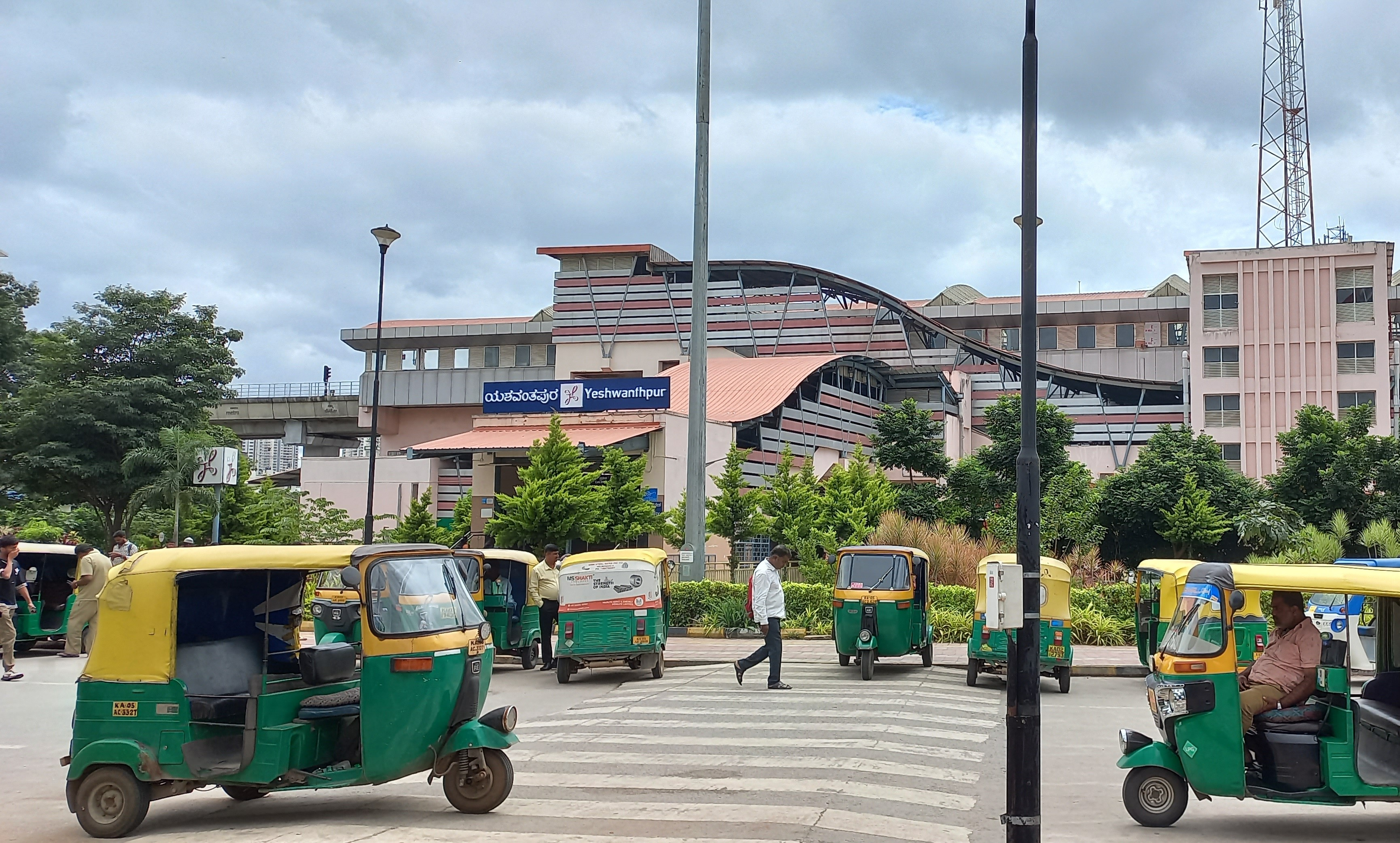
- Front Entrance of this Namma Metro Station

General information
- Other names: Yeshwanthapura, Yesvantpur
- Location: Tumkur Main Rd, Yeshwanthpur Industrial Area, Bengaluru, Karnataka 560022
- Coordinates: 13°01′23″N 77°33′00″E
- System: Namma Metro station
- Owner: Bangalore Metro Rail Corporation Ltd (BMRCL)
- Operator: Namma Metro
- Line: Green Line
- Platforms: Side platform Platform-1 → Madavara; Platform-2 → Silk Institute
- Tracks: 2
- Connections: Yeshwanthpur Jn. Sampige Mallige

Construction
- Structure type: Elevated, Double track
- Platform levels: 2
- Parking: Available
- Accessible: Yes
- Architect: Larsen & Toubro

Other information
- Status: Staffed
- Station code: YPM

History
- Opened: 1 March 2014; 12 years ago
- Electrified: 750 V DC third rail

Services
Preceding station	Namma Metro	Following station
Goraguntepalya towards Madavara	Green Line	Sandal Soap Factory towards Silk Institute
Route map
Location

Yeshwanthpur is an important elevated metro station on the North-South corridor of the Green Line of Namma Metro serving the Yeshwanthpur area of Bengaluru, India. It was opened to the public on 1 March 2014.

== Skywalk ==
The BMRC has proposed constructing a skywalk linking Platform 6 of Yesvantpur Junction railway station with the "E" entrance of the metro station. The skywalk is estimated to cost ₹1 crore (US$100,000). Although the skywalk was first proposed shortly after the metro station's opening in 2014, disagreements over funding have delayed its construction. The BMRC wants the cost to be split evenly with the Indian Railways. However, the Railways believes that the BMRC must bear the entire cost. A Railway official stated, "The rules are quite clear on this matter. Whenever a second government agency creates a new infrastructure project at any specific place and any public amenity needs to be created for that, the onus is on the new entrant to bear the costs of the project. Metro feels the need for it and it needs to be ready to fund it. Why should Railways bear the cost for something that Metro requires?"

The BMRC finalized plans for the skywalk and received clearance for its construction from the South Western Railway's Bengaluru division on 12 April 2019.

== Station layout ==
G	Street level	Exit/Entrance
L1	Mezzanine	Fare control, station agent, Metro Card vending machines, crossover
L2	Side platform | Doors will open on the left
L2	Platform 2 Southbound	Towards → Silk Institute; Next Station: Sandal Soap Factory
L2	Platform 1 Northbound	Towards ← Madavara; Next Station: Goraguntepalya
L2	Side platform | Doors will open on the left
L2

== Connections ==
The station is located opposite the Yeshvantapur railway station.

== Entry/Exits ==
There are 7 Entry/Exit points – A, B, C, D, E, F and G. Commuters can use either of the points for their travel.

== Gallery ==
Some of this metro station pictures are shown below:-

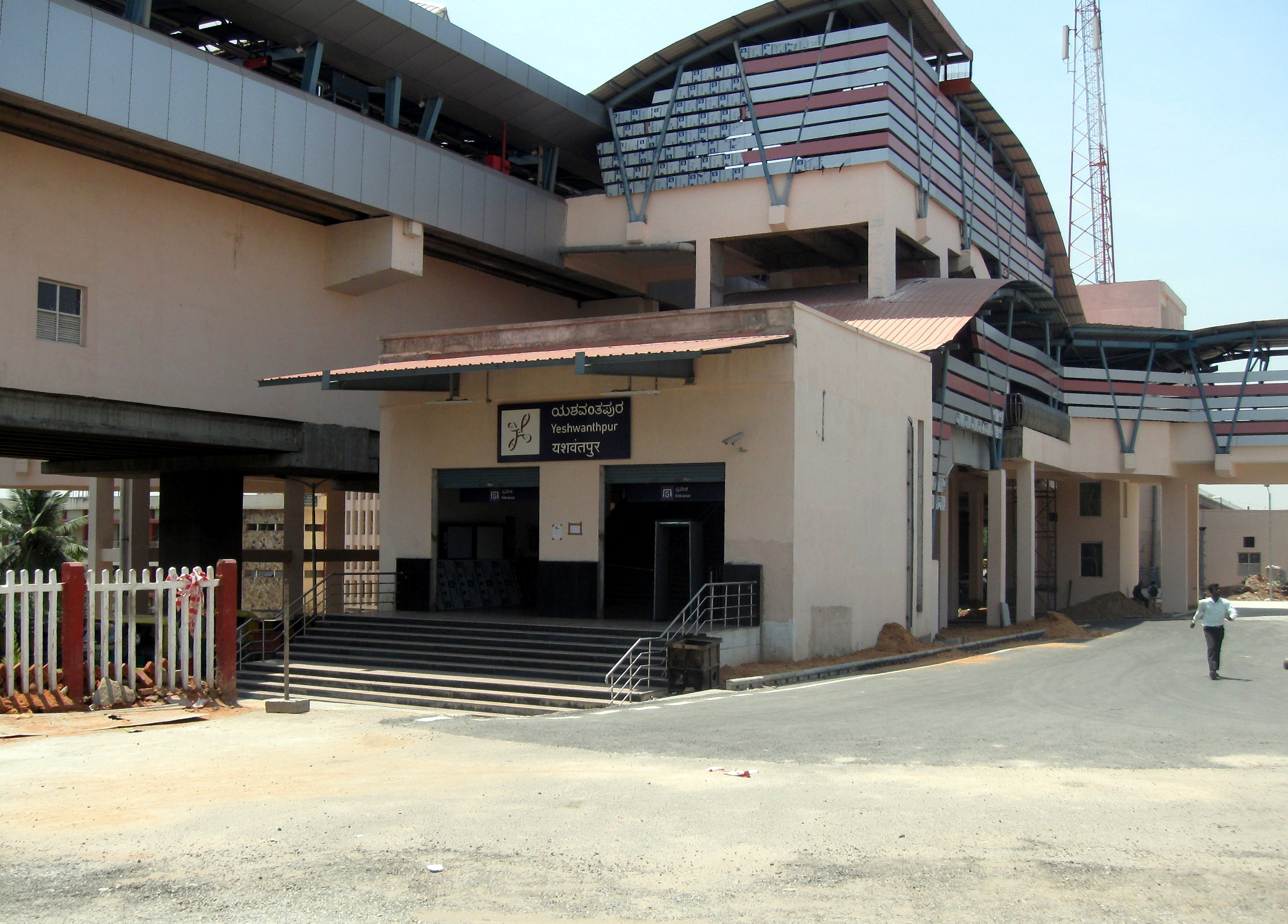
Outside View

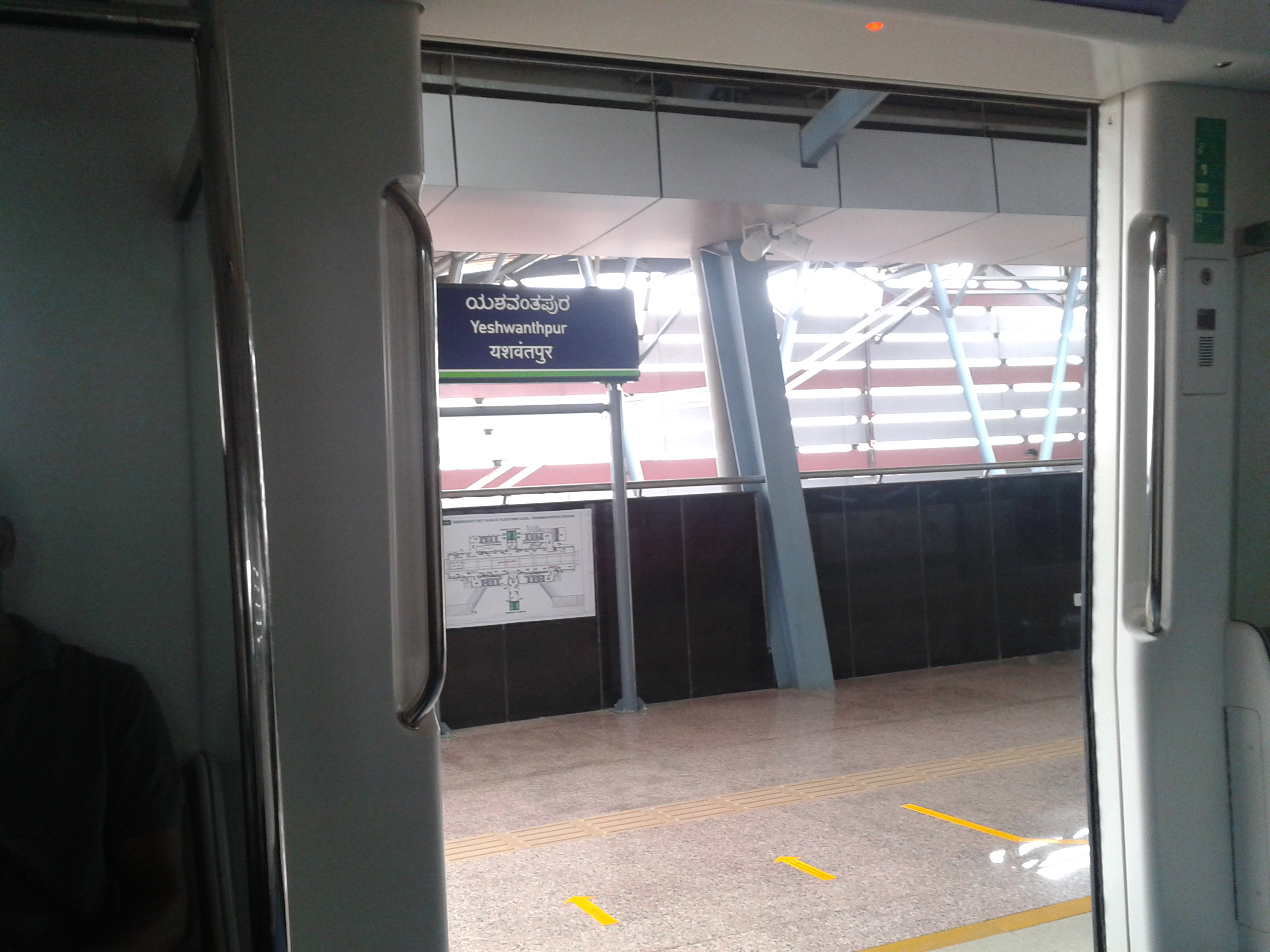
Station signage on the platform

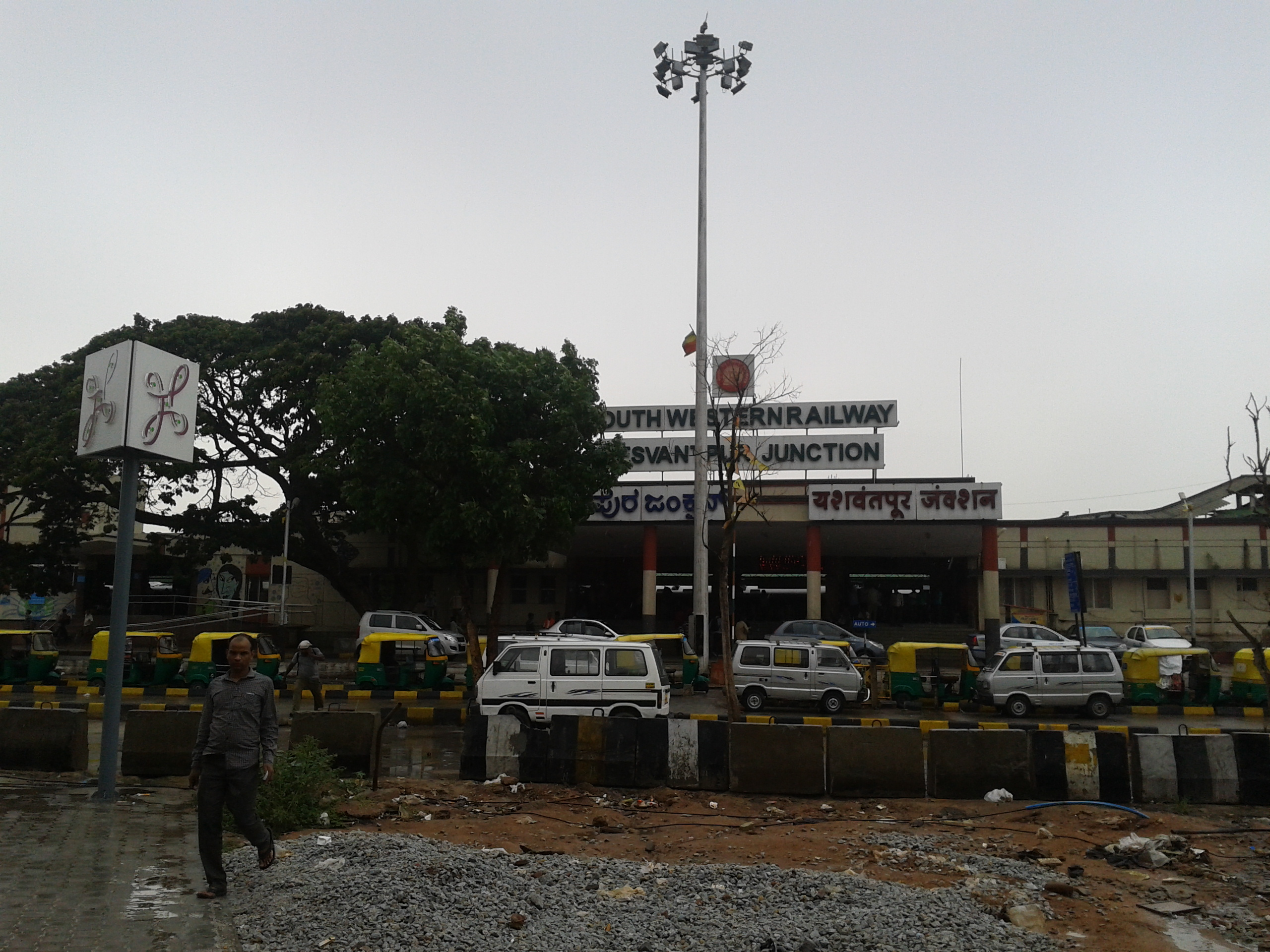
Yeshvantapur Junction located opposite to the metro station

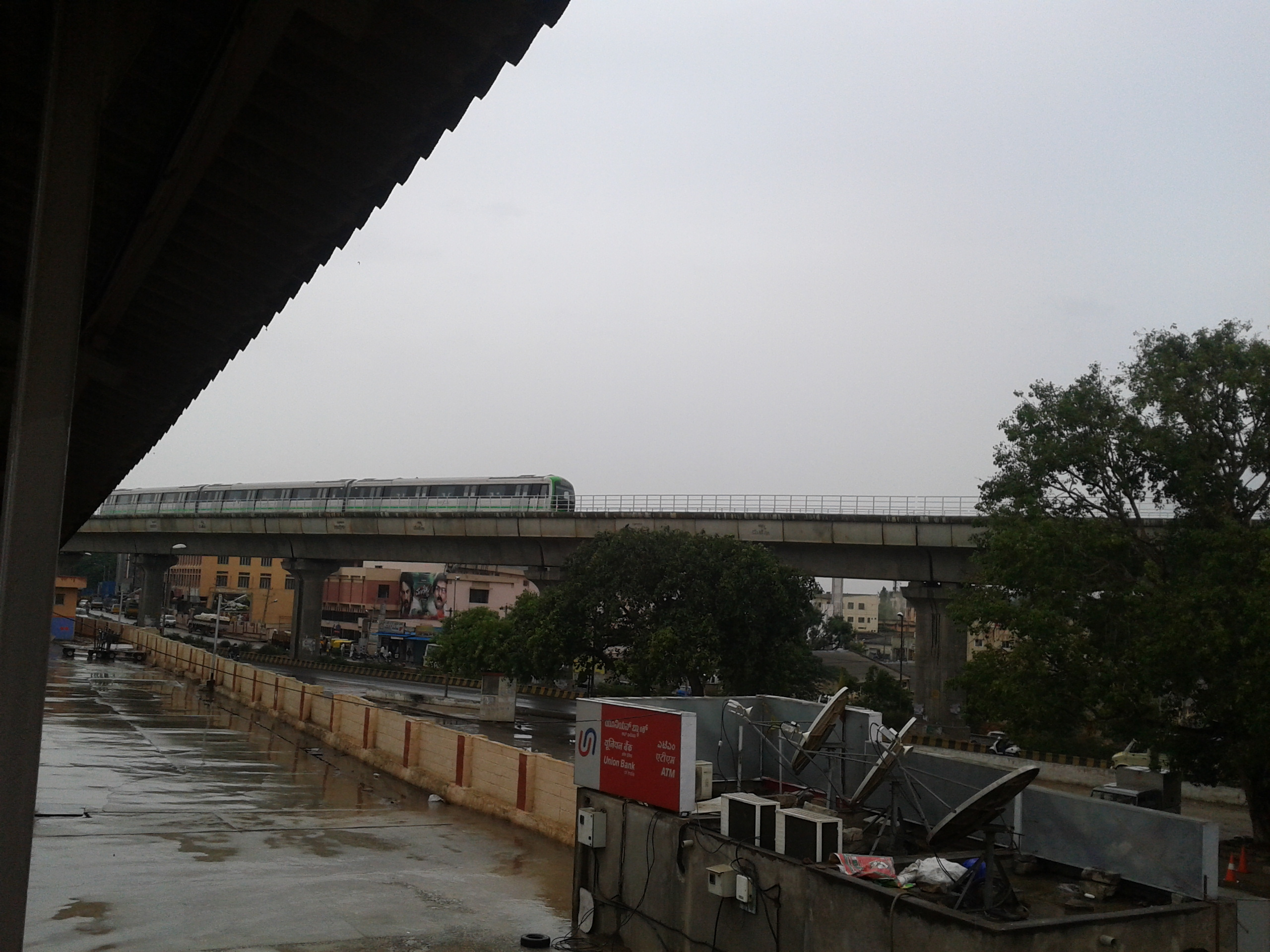
Bangalore Metro as seen from Yeshwantpur Junction

== See also ==
- Bengaluru
- List of Namma Metro stations
- Transport in Karnataka
- List of metro systems
- List of rapid transit systems in India
