= Punj Lloyd =

Construction company based in Gurgaon, India

Punj Lloyd Limited
- Type: Public Limited
- Traded as: BSE: 532693; NSE: PUNJLLOYD
- Industry: Energy; Infrastructure; Defense
- Founded: 1982
- Headquarters: Gurgaon, Haryana, India
- Key people: Atul Punj (Chairman & MD)
- Revenue: ▼₹5,585.77 crore (US$580 million) (2018)
- Operating income: ▼₹−186.01 crore (US$−19 million) (2018)
- Net income: ▲₹−71.82 crore (US$−7.5 million) (2018)
- Total assets: ▼₹11,180.52 crore (US$1.2 billion) (2018)
- Total equity: ▼₹−2,026.78 crore (US$−210 million) (2018)
- Number of employees: 7,359 (March 2018)
- Website: www.punjlloyd.com

Punj Lloyd Limited was an Indian Engineering, procurement and construction (EPC) company providing services for energy, infrastructure and defense sectors. The company's operations are spread across the Middle East and Africa, Asia Pacific, South Asia and Europe. The group includes over 50 subsidiaries and has executed many projects in more than 60 countries. The company is headquartered in Gurgaon, Haryana and its stocks were listed on the Bombay Stock Exchange (BSE) and National Stock Exchange (NSE), until it went into liquidation

== History ==
The foundation of the company was laid by its chairman Atul Punj in 1982 when he started the pipeline division of his family business, Punj Sons Private Limited. He later incorporated it into Punj Lloyd Engineering private limited. The company was rechristened to its current name in 1989. The company is currently in liquidation

== Subsidiary companies ==
Major subsidiaries of Punj Lloyd include:

- PLN Construction Ltd, India
- Punj Lloyd Infrastructure Ltd, India
- PL Engineering Ltd, India
- Dayim Punj Lloyd Construction Contracting Co. Ltd., Saudi Arabia
- Khagaria Purnea Highway Project Ltd, India
- PT Punj Lloyd, Indonesia
- Punj Lloyd, Kazakhstan
- Punj Lloyd Pte Ltd, Singapore
- Punj Lloyd Infrastructure Pte. Ltd, Singapore
- Punj Lloyd Oil & Gas Sdn. Bhd., Malaysia
- Punj Lloyd Sdn. Bhd., Malaysia
- Punj Lloyd Building & Infrastructure Pvt. Ltd, Sri Lanka
- Indraprastha Renewables Pvt Ltd, India
- Punj Lloyd Aviation Limited, India
- Dayawanti Punj Model School (CSR), Sitamarhi, Bhadohi, Uttar Pradesh, India

Other group companies of Punj Lloyd Group are:

- Aero Euro Engineering India Private Ltd, India
- PLE TCI Engenharia Ltda, Brazil
- PT Kekal Adidaya, Indonesia
- Air Works Engineering India Pvt. Ltd., India
