= Cornerstone Park, Bengaluru =

Public park in Bangalore, Karnataka, India

Coordinates: 12.978002°N 77.641209°E

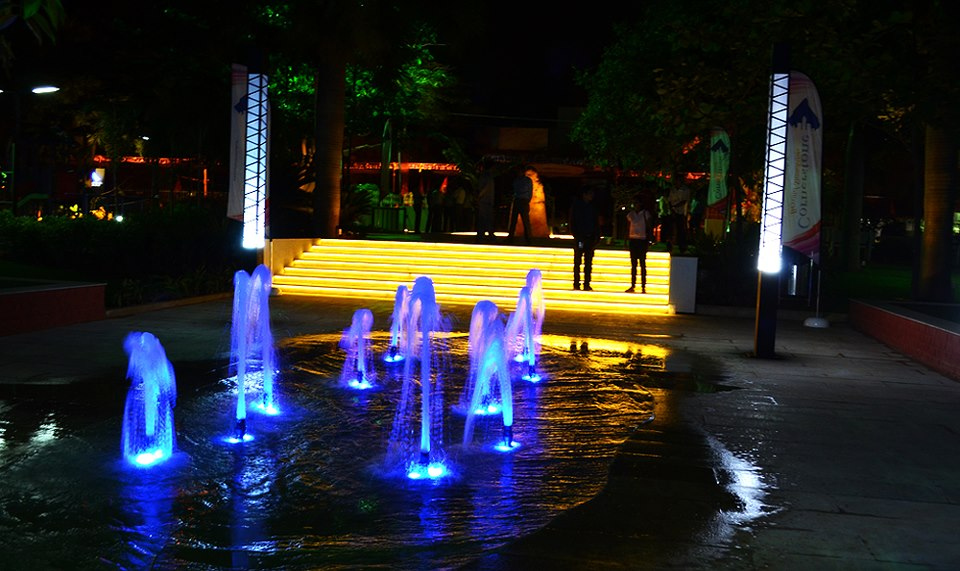
Park at night

Cornerstone Park is a public park located at the junction of the CMH Road and 100 Ft Road in the heart of Indiranagar, Bangalore, Karnataka, India. The BBMP (local council) park was renovated by Cornerstone Properties in 2012 as a part of a social initiative that has been formed to address social and environmental concerns of Bangalore. The renovations were aimed to revitalizing residential neighborhoods and communities with elements of functional design and ecological functions. The highlight of the park is the city's only outdoor vertical garden.

The park was inaugurated on the occasion of the 150th birth anniversary of Swami Vivekananda by Ananthkumar, MP and General Secretary of the BJP and presided by S. Raghu, MLA of Sir C. V. Raman Nagar Constituency. The Chief Guests include P. C. Mohan MP, Shri. A. Ravindra (Chief Advisor for the C. M. & Chief Secretary, Govt. of Karnataka), Savitha Ramesh (Corporator, Hoysala Nagar) and B. P. Kumar Babu (managing director of Cornerstone Properties). The communications were designed and developed by Circuit 9 Communications Private Limited.
