= Ulsoor =

- Neighbourhood
- Halasuru
- Location within Bengaluru
- Coordinates: 12.97°N 77.63°E
- Country: India
- State: Karnataka
- Metro: Bangalore

Languages
  - Official: kannada
- Time zone: UTC+5:30 (IST)
- PIN: 560008,560042
- Vehicle registration: KA-03

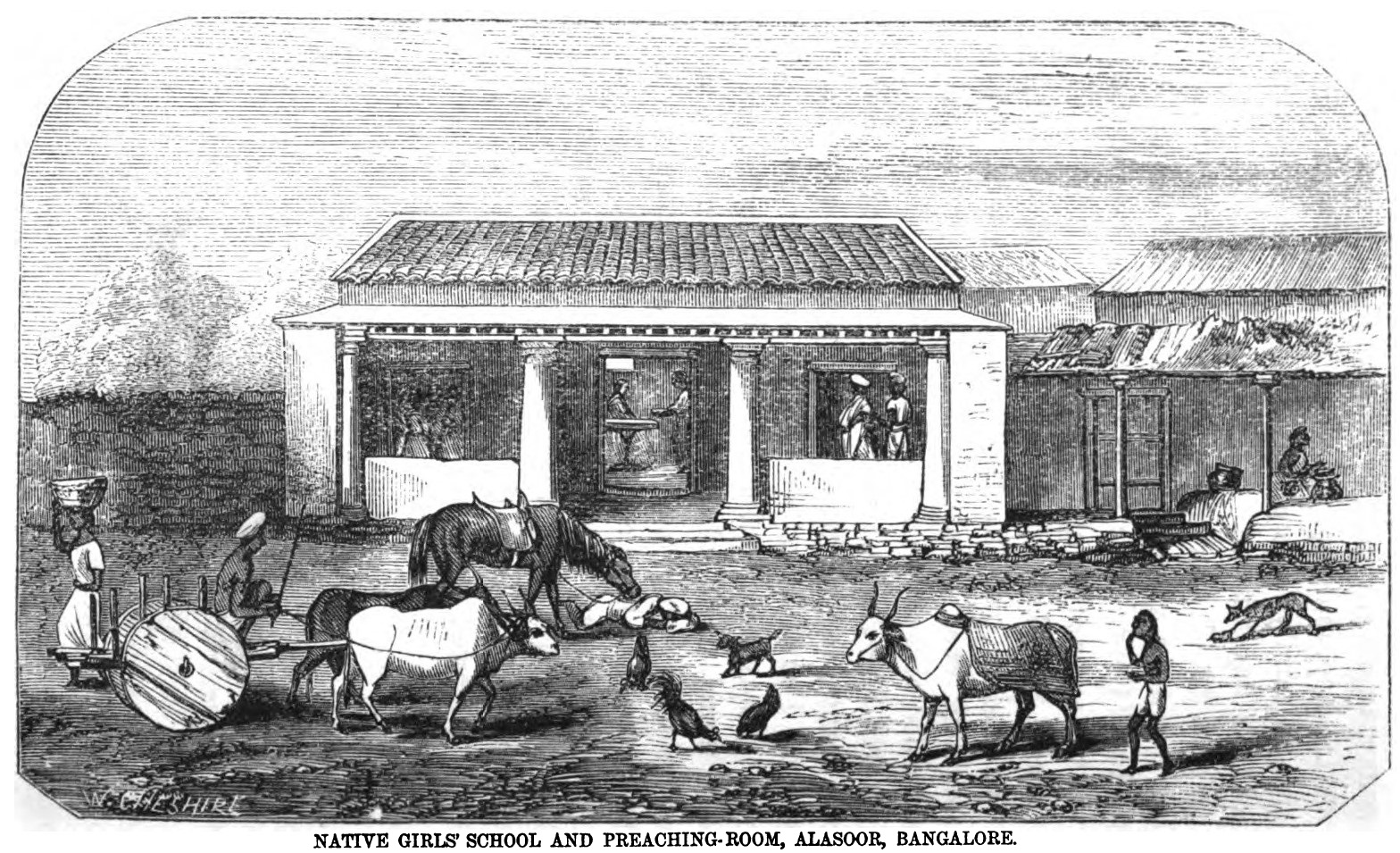
Native Girls' School and Preaching-Room, Alasoor, Bangalore (p.184, 1865)

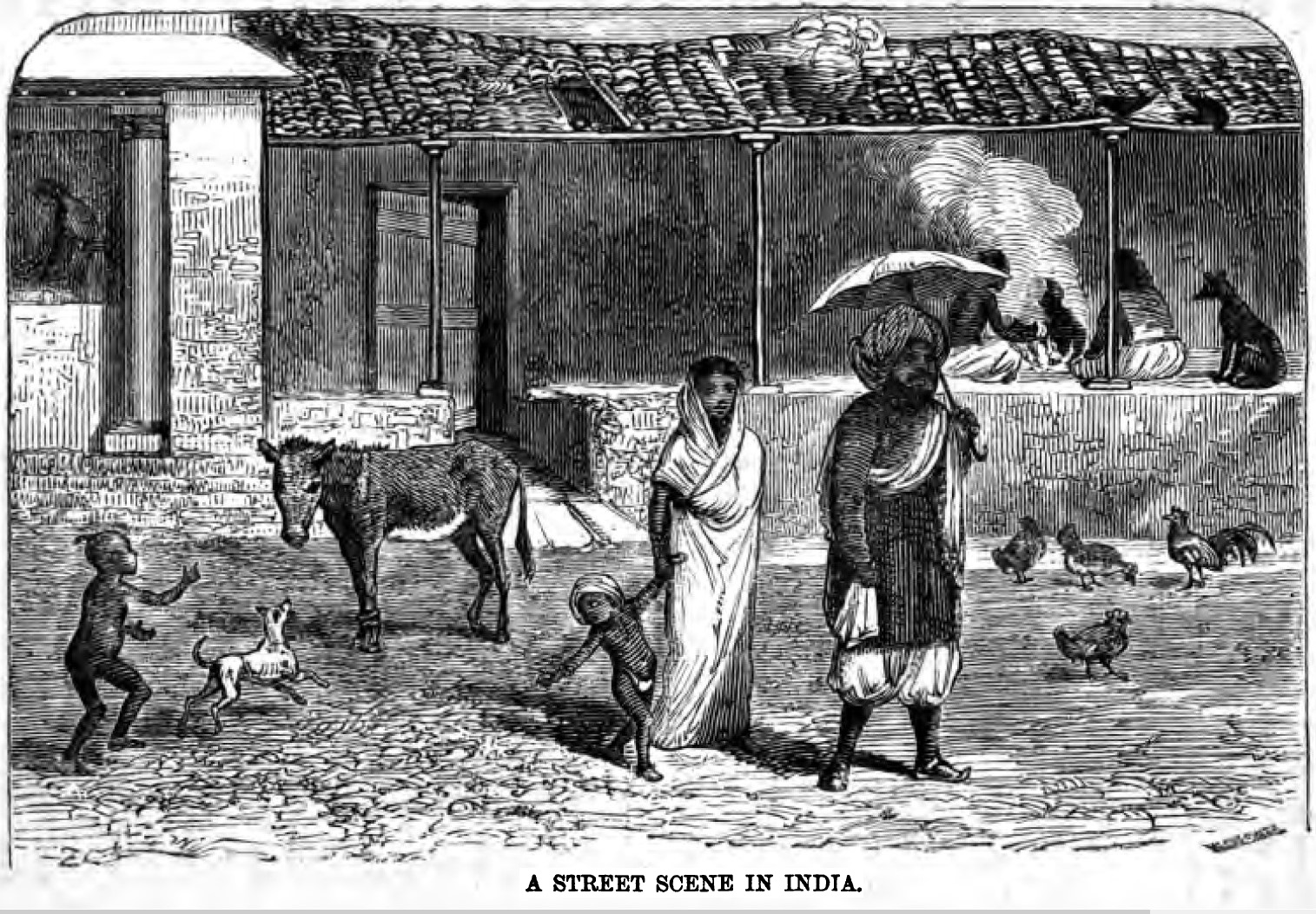
A Street Scene in India, Outside the Wesleyan Girls School, Bangalore (January 1869, p.7)

Juggernaut cart in the Halasuru temple complex in Bangalore, India, around 1870

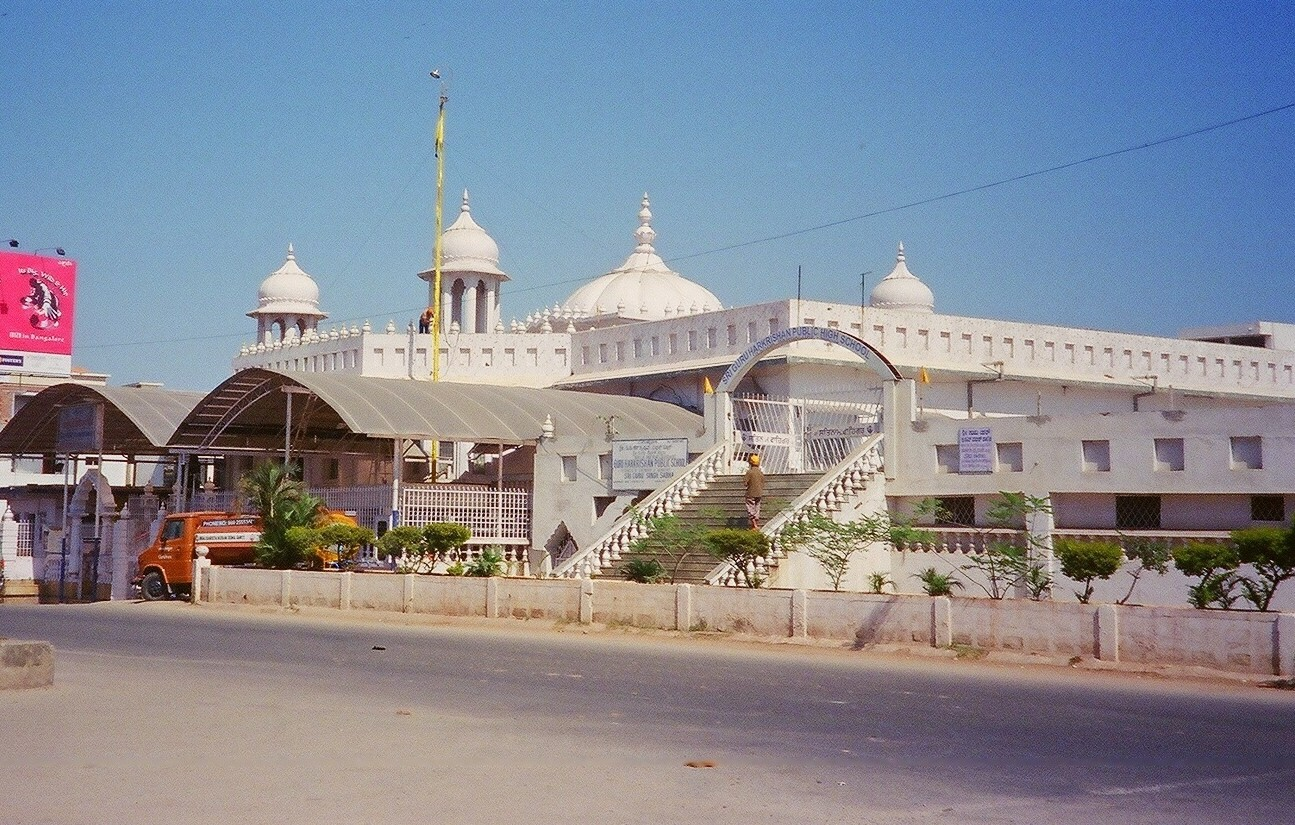
Sri Guru Singh Sabha Gurudwara, Halasuru

Ulsoor, officially known as Halasuru, is one of the oldest neighbourhoods in the city of Bengaluru. It is in central Bengaluru, and begins near the eastern terminus of Mahatma Gandhi Raste. It is renowned for its numerous temples and market.

== History and name ==
The village of Bangalore is said to have been gifted to Kempe Gowda I (1513–1569) by the Vijayanagara emperors. The Halasuru Lake was built by his successor, Kempe Gowda II, and is the only surviving tank built by the Gowda kings in Bangalore. The first British military station was established in Halasuru in 1807.

There used to be a jackfruit orchard near the Halasuru Lake, and the Kannada name for jackfruit being 'Halasina Hannu', the area came to be known as Halasuru. During the British colonial rule, the name was corrupted to Ulsoor.

== Bengaluru Metro Rail ==
There are two Namma Metro Rail stations in Halasuru:

- Halasuru (on Old Madras Road, at the end closer to CMH Road)
- Trinity (at Trinity Circle)

== See also ==
- Halasuru Someshwara Temple
- Indiranagar
- Sri Subrahmanya Temple, Halasuru
- Halasuru lake
