= Sri Subrahmanya Temple, Halasuru =

Temple in Bengaluru, India

Religion
- Festival: Thaipusam

The Sri Subrahmanya Temple is reputed to be more than 350 years old. The temple is close to the celebrated Halasuru Someshwara Temple, and opposite Sri Sri Sri Adi Vinayaka Temple owned by P P Ravindra Kumar near Halasuru metro station. It is said that this temple is older than Sri Someshwara Temple. The deity is also known as Ananda Murugan here. The lord Subrahmanya here is a replica of Murugan at Thiruthani Murugan Temple one of Arupadaiveedus of Murugan. Lord Subrahmanya is flanked by Valli on His right and Devasena on His left in this temple in separate shrines.

== Legend ==
Legend has it that this temple was built by one of the Maharajas of Mysore many centuries ago. The then Maharaja of Mysore was on his way to visit his uncle who was suffering from eye disease. It came to his notice that there were devotees frequenting an Anthill at the present site of the temple. The Maharaja visited the anthill and prayed that if his uncle is cured of the eye disease, he would build a temple at the site for the Lord. Once the Maharaja reached Mysore, it was brought to his notice that his uncle was cured of the eye disease. The temple was constructed to thank the Lord as a votive offering.

There is a sculpture of sage Mandavya in the Mantapam. As per one of the versions, Sage Mandavya had this temple built on being directed by the Lord. Some are of the opinion that this temple was built around the same time Sri Someshwara temple was built due to its connection with Sage Mandavya.

== Specialties of the temple ==
There are separate shrines for Chandikeshwara and Nagadevata. It is believed that the temple was once a Shiva temple. The temple also has Ardha Nareeshwara, Durga, Surya Narayana Sage Agastya, Navagrahas and Kalabhairava enshrined. The temple follows Shaivagama guidelines. There are Nandis on the temple walls and Lord Vishnu shrine at the back entrance of the temple. This is typical of a Shiva temple. The Sthala Vriksha is Athi maram. There is a tank within the temple premises.

== Address and Timings ==
Address: Sri Subrahmanya Swamy Temple, Old Madras Road, Halasuru, Bangalore - 560008.

Timings: 6:00 AM to 12:00 in the noon and 5:30 PM to 9:00 PM
