= Halasuru metro station =

Namma Metro's Purple Line metro station

Halasuru
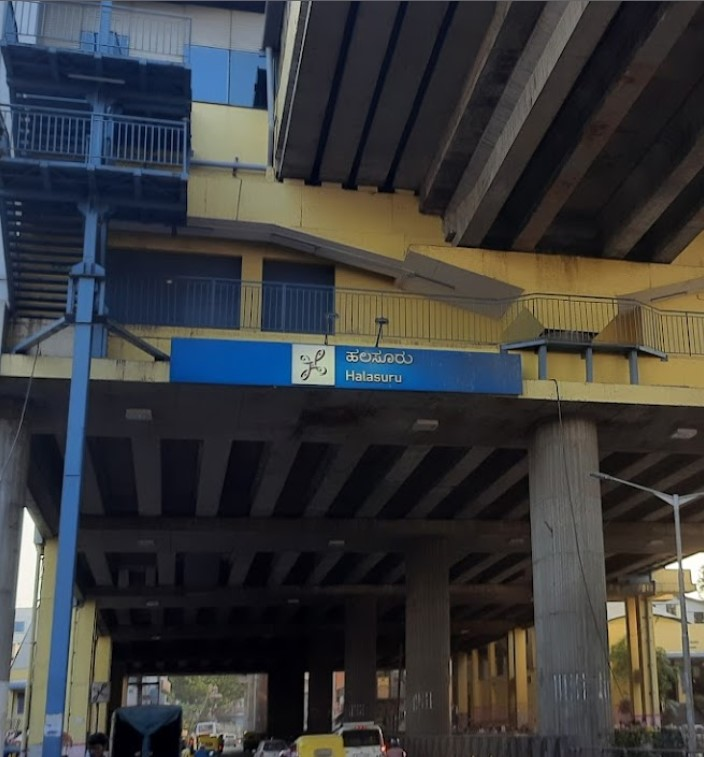

General information
- Other names: Ulsoor
- Location: Swamy Vivekananda Road, Halasuru, Bengaluru, Karnataka 560008; India
- Coordinates: 12°58′32″N 77°37′35″E
- System: Namma Metro station
- Owner: Bangalore Metro Rail Corporation Ltd (BMRCL)
- Operator: Namma Metro
- Line: Purple Line
- Platforms: Side platform Platform-1 → Whitefield (Kadugodi); Platform-2 → Challaghatta
- Tracks: 2

Construction
- Structure type: Elevated
- Platform levels: 2
- Cycle facilities: Yes
- Accessible: Yes
- Architect: IVRCL

Other information
- Status: Staffed
- Station code: HLRU

History
- Opened: 20 October 2011; 14 years ago
- Electrified: 750 V DC third rail

Services
Preceding station	Namma Metro	Following station
Indira Nagar towards Whitefield (Kadugodi)	Purple Line	Trinity towards Challaghatta
Route map
Location

Halasuru is an elevated metro station on the east–west corridor of the Purple Line of Namma Metro in Bengaluru, India. It was opened to the public on 20 October 2011. It is located in the Halasuru locality of Bengaluru.

== Station layout ==
G	Street level	Exit/entrance
L1	Mezzanine	Fare control, station agent, Metro Card vending machines, crossover
L2	Side platform | Doors will open on the left
L2	Platform 1 Eastbound	Towards → Whitefield (Kadugodi); Next station: Indira Nagar
L2	Platform 2 Westbound	Towards ← Challaghatta; Next station: Trinity
L2	Side platform | Doors will open on the left
L2

== Entry/exits ==
There are three entry/exit points – A, B and C. Commuters can use either of the points for their travel.

- Entry/exit point A: towards Ramakrishna Mutt side
- Entry/exit point B: towards Ramakrishna Mutt side
- Entry/exit point C: towards Jogupalya side
  - Wheelchair accessibility has been provided for both entry/exit points A and B.

== See also ==
- Bengaluru
- Halasuru
- List of Namma Metro stations
- Transport in Karnataka
- List of metro systems
- List of rapid transit systems in India
- Bengaluru Metropolitan Transport Corporation
