= Indira Nagar metro station (Bengaluru) =

Namma Metro's Purple Line metro station

Indiranagar
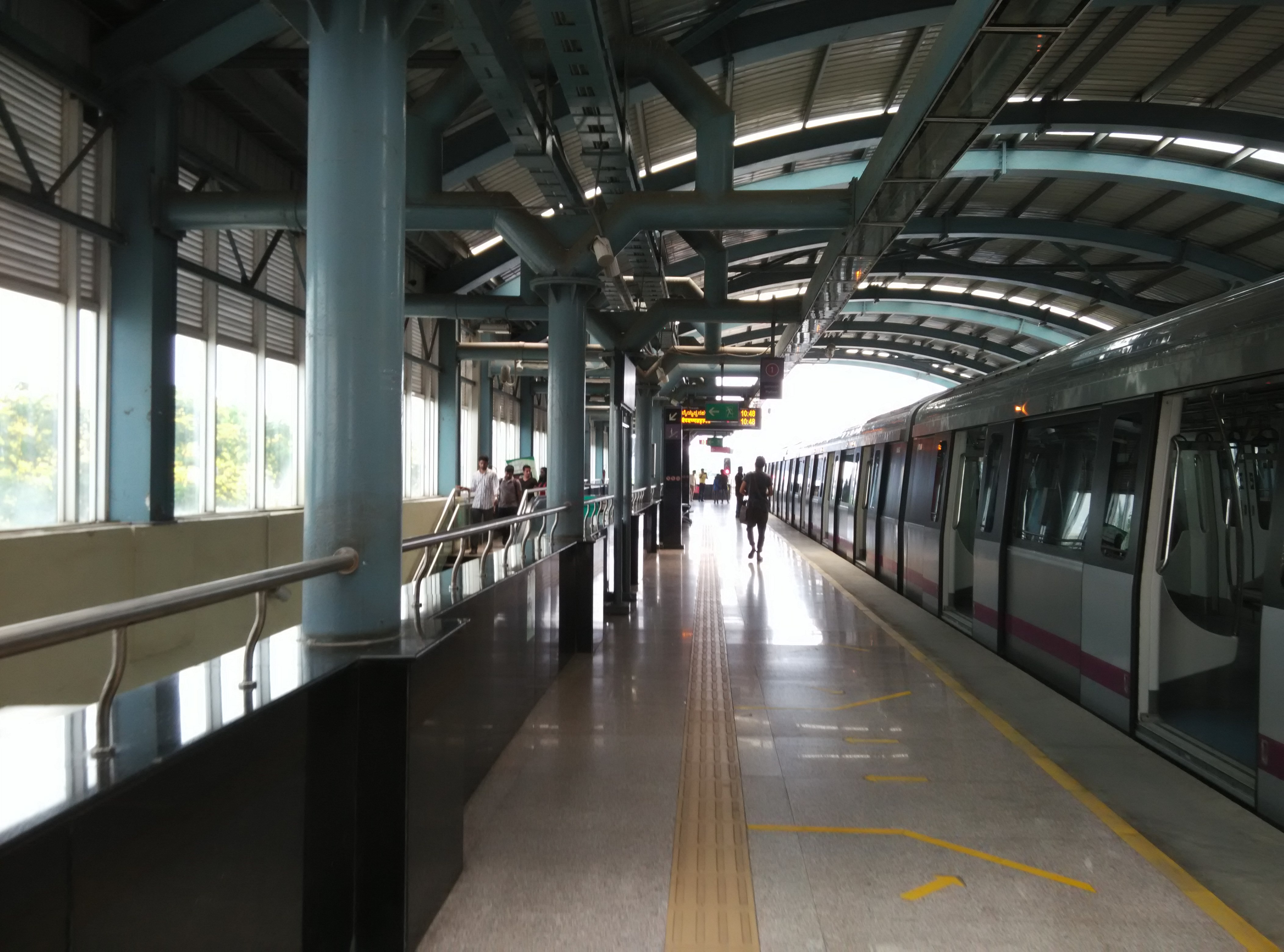
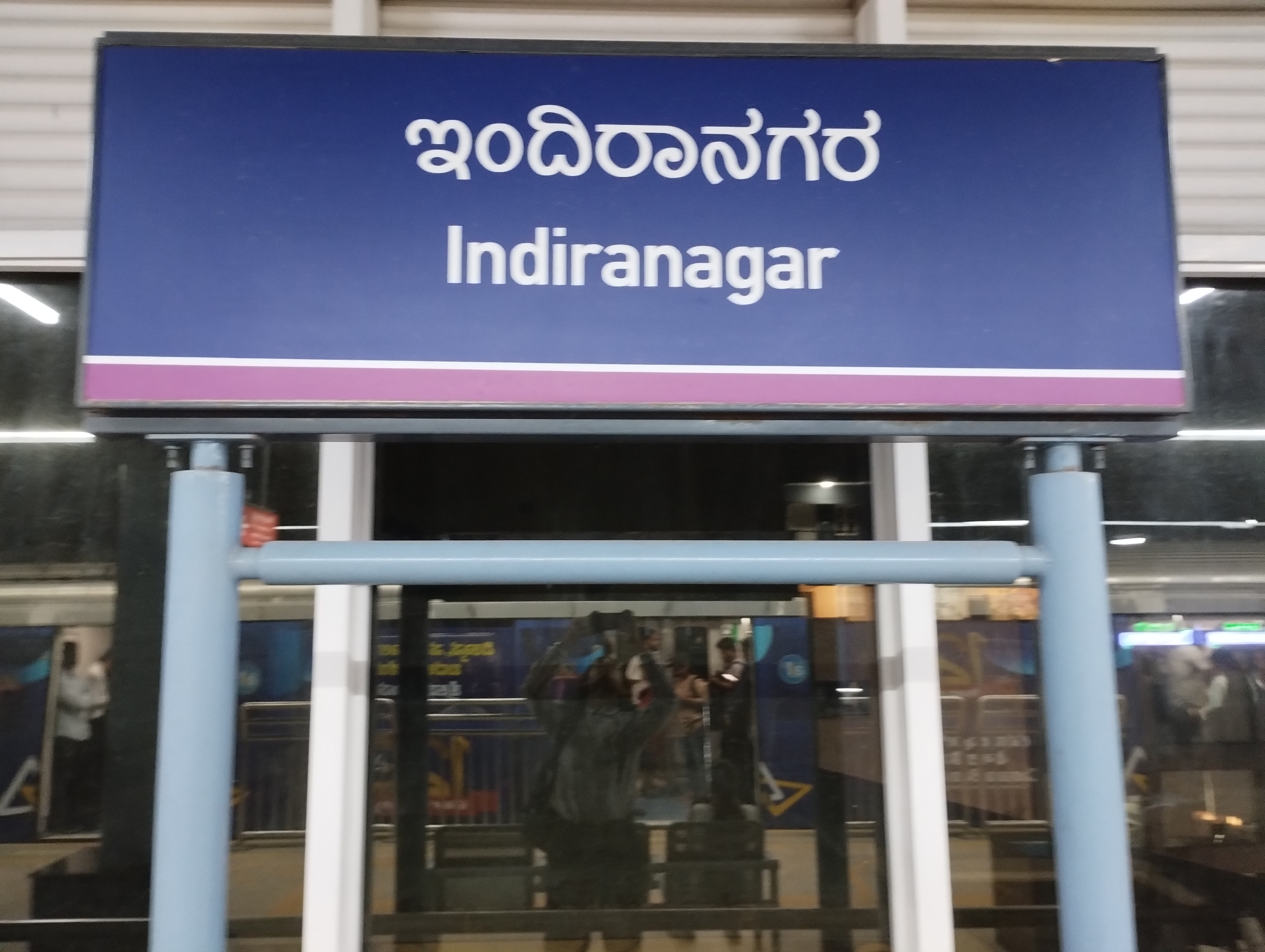
- From top to bottom: the station platform, signage bearing the station's name on one of the platforms.

General information
- Other names: Indiranagara / CMH Road
- Location: CMH Road, Indiranagar; India
- Coordinates: 12°58′43″N 77°38′20″E
- System: Namma Metro station
- Owner: Bangalore Metro Rail Corporation Ltd (BMRCL)
- Operator: Namma Metro
- Line: Purple Line
- Platforms: Side platform Platform-1 → Whitefield (Kadugodi); Platform-2 → Challaghatta
- Tracks: 2

Construction
- Structure type: Elevated
- Platform levels: 2
- Parking: available
- Accessible: Yes
- Architect: IVRCL – I8CR JV

Other information
- Status: Staffed
- Station code: IDN

History
- Opened: 20 October 2011; 14 years ago
- Electrified: 750 V DC third rail

Services
Preceding station	Namma Metro	Following station
Swami Vivekananda Road towards Whitefield (Kadugodi)	Purple Line	Halasuru towards Challaghatta
Route map
Location

Indiranagar is an elevated metro station on the east–west corridor of the Purple Line of Namma Metro. It is located on the CMH Road in the Indiranagar locality in Bengaluru, India. It was opened to the public on 20 October 2011 as one of the first six stations to be inaugurated.

== Station layout ==
P	Side Platform | Doors will open on the left
P	Platform 1 Eastbound	Towards → Whitefield (Kadugodi); Next Station: Swami Vivekananda Road
P	Platform 2 Westbound	Towards ← Challaghatta; Next Station: Halasuru
P	Side Platform | Doors will open on the left
C	Concourse	Fare control, station agent, Metro Card vending machines, crossover
G	Street level	Exit/Entrance

== Entry/exits ==
There are three entry/exit points – A, B and C. Commuters can use either of the points for their travel.

- Entry/exit point A: towards Raghavendra Swamy Mutt
- Entry/exit point B: towards ESI Hospital
- Entry/exit point C: towards ESI Hospital
  - Lift with wheelchair accessibility has been provided for both the entry/exit points B and C.

== See also ==
- List of Namma Metro stations
- Transport in Karnataka
- List of metro systems
- List of rapid transit systems in India
- Bengaluru Metropolitan Transport Corporation
