= Trinity metro station =

Namma Metro's Purple Line metro station

Trinity
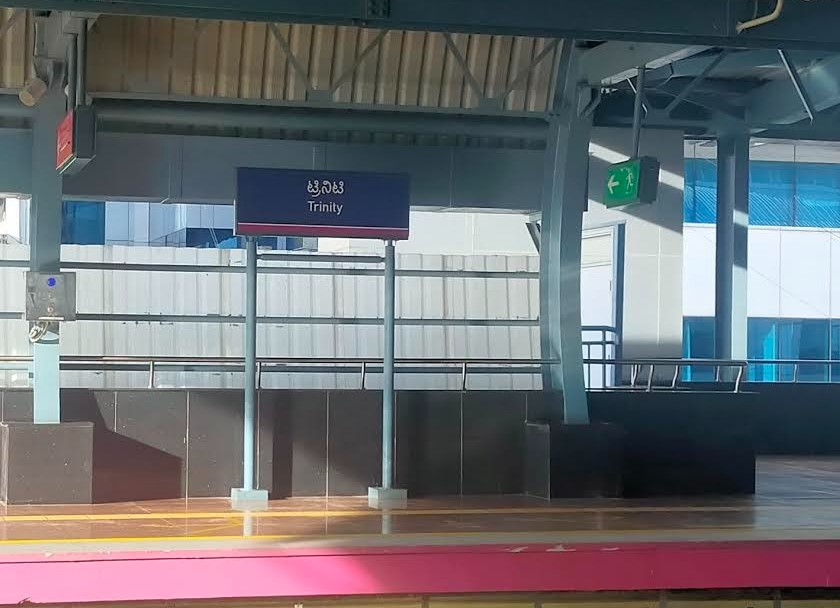
- Trinity metro station

General information
- Location: M.G. Road, Yellappa Chetty Layout, Sivanchetti Gardens, Bengaluru, Karnataka 560001; India
- Coordinates: 12°58′23″N 77°37′01″E
- System: Namma Metro station
- Owner: Bangalore Metro Rail Corporation Ltd (BMRCL)
- Operator: Namma Metro
- Line: Purple Line
- Platforms: Side platform Platform-1 → Whitefield (Kadugodi); Platform-2 → Challaghatta
- Tracks: 2

Construction
- Structure type: Elevated
- Platform levels: 2
- Cycle facilities: Yes
- Accessible: Yes
- Architect: Punj Lloyd - Sembawang Infrastructure (India) JV

Other information
- Station code: TTY

History
- Opened: 20 October 2011; 14 years ago
- Electrified: 750 V DC third rail

Services
Preceding station	Namma Metro	Following station
Halasuru towards Whitefield (Kadugodi)	Purple Line	Mahatma Gandhi Road towards Challaghatta
Route map
Location

Trinity is an elevated metro station on the East-West corridor of the Purple Line of Namma Metro in Bangalore, India. It was opened to the public on 20 October 2011. The station was constructed by Punj Lloyd.

== History ==
On 9 July 2014, the Bangalore Metro Rail Corporation Ltd (BMRCL) issued a tender for co-branding the station with a large corporation. The winning company will be given signage and a kiosk in the station, and their name will become part of the station name, and announced when the stop is called on board the trains.

== Station structure ==
=== Basement ===
The BMRCL constructed a 4,000 sq ft area basement at the station in early 2016. The agency initially planned to use the space for storage, but later decided to rent it out for use by cultural groups. Initially, music jams occurred in basement, but it was more suited for theatre. The basement has eighteen lights installed, and the floor is painted to form a stage. The space can be rented out by obtaining permission from the metro office at MG Road. The BMRCL charges a rent of ₹400 (US$4.20) per hour.

=== Station layout ===
G	Street level	Exit/Entrance
L1	Mezzanine	Fare control, station agent, Metro Card vending machines, crossover
L2	Side platform | Doors will open on the left
L2	Platform 1 Eastbound	Towards → Whitefield (Kadugodi); Next station: Halasuru
L2	Platform 2 Westbound	Towards ← Challaghatta; Next station: Mahatma Gandhi Road; Change at the next station for Pink Line
L2	Side platform | Doors will open on the left
L2

== See also ==
- Bangalore
- List of Namma Metro stations
- Transport in Karnataka
- List of metro systems
- List of rapid transit systems in India
- Bangalore Metropolitan Transport Corporation
