= New Horizon Public School =

New Horizon Public School, Indiranagar
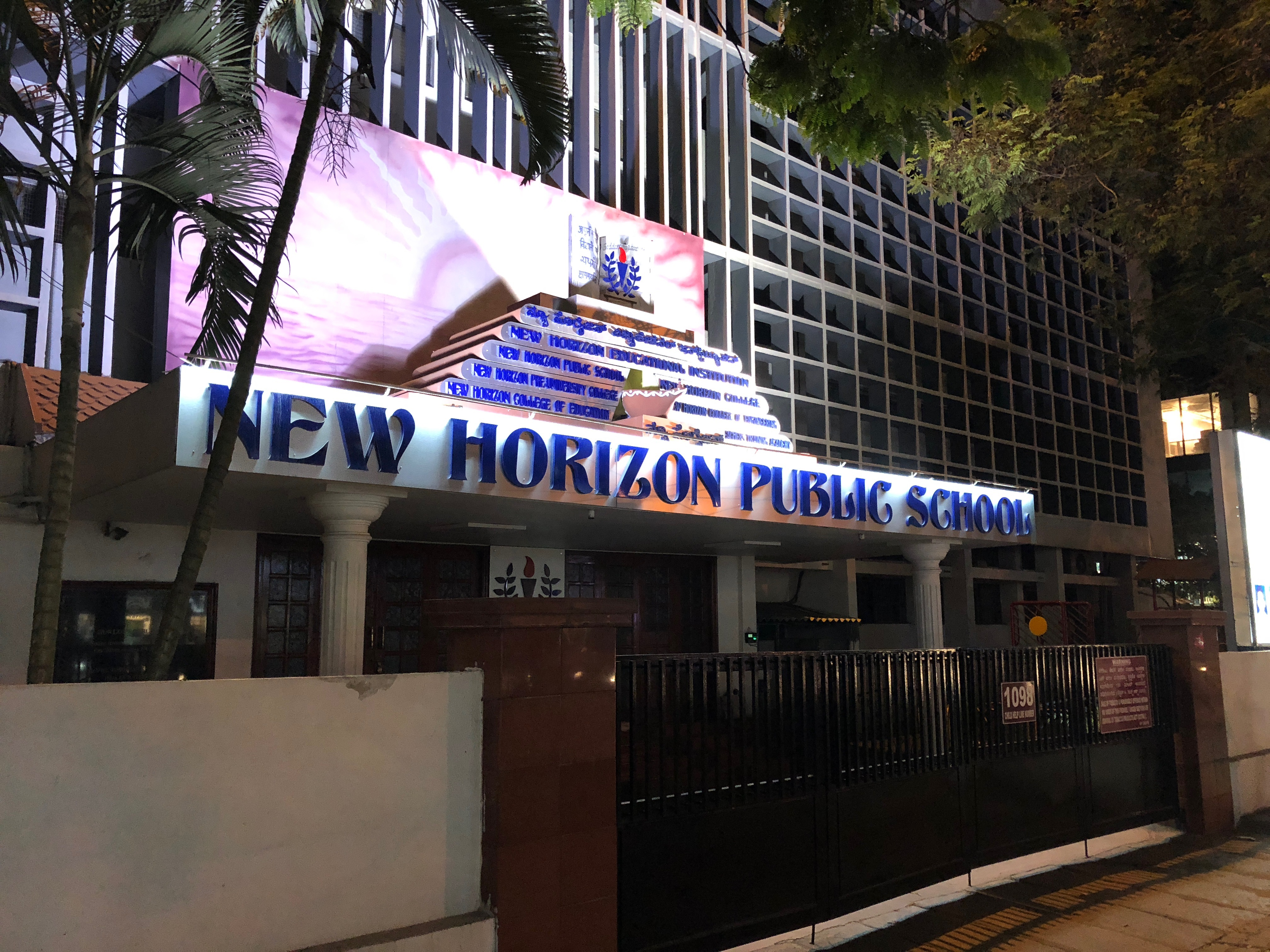
- The entrance of new horizon public school

Location
- 1138, 100 Feet Rd, HAL 2nd Stage, Indiranagar, Bengaluru, Karnataka 560008, India; Bangalore, Karnataka; India
- Coordinates: 12.967487057255648, 77.64181627146574

Information
- Type: Private school
- Motto: In Pursuit of Excellence
- Established: 1970
- Principal: Anupama Sethi
- Enrollment: Nursery – 10 (ICSE)
- Publication: New Horizon Times
- Website: nhps.in

The New Horizon Public School, Indiranagar, is a private school located in Indiranagar, Bangalore, India. The New Horizon campus is situated on 100 Feet Road, Indiranagar.

== Houses ==
The students are divided into four houses named – Agni, Pritthvi, Vayu, Jal, each house having its own motto and song.

== Academics ==
The school follows the ICSE syllabus, using continuous evaluation techniques to assess the students.

- Class I and II: 4 Worksheets
- Class III to IX: Two monthly tests and two terminal examinations are conducted for all subjects during the academic year.
- Class X: Two terminal and two model examinations are conducted in preparation for the ICSE Board examinations. Board Exams are also held in the school itself.

== Sports facilities ==
The school has basketball and volleyball courts. For young children, the school has slides, swings, parallel bars, rope climbing and a sand pit. Older children who are inclined towards sports are trained under professional coaches in athletics, karate, aerobics and other team games.
