= Indiranagar, Bengaluru =

Indiranagar
- Neighbourhood
- Indiranagara
- Location within Bengaluru
- Coordinates: 12.9699°N 77.6499°E
- Country: India
- State: Karnataka
- District: Bengaluru Urban
- Metro: Bangalore
- Ward: 58, 80, 88, 89, 112

Government
  - Body: BBMP

Languages
  - Official: Kannada
- Time zone: UTC+5:30 (IST)
- PIN: 560038
- Vehicle registration: KA-03
- Lok Sabha constituency: Bangalore Central
- Vidhan Sabha constituency: C.V. Raman Nagar, Shantinagar
- Planning agency: BDA

Indiranagar is an affluent and luxury neighbourhood in east Bengaluru, Karnataka, India. Indiranagar is one of the most expensive cosmopolitan neighbourhoods in Bangalore.

== Community ==
The Indiranagar Sangeetha Sabha organises music and dance programs. It also conducts promotional activities, seminars, puppet shows and annual cultural programs, such as vocal and instrumental music concerts. Sangeetha Sabha constructed Purandhara Bhavan, which promotes performing arts, theatre and drama. Close to the Sangeetha Sabha is the Indiranagar Club, spread across 2.5 acres of land. The membership fee is high at 10 lakh rupees, and the club boasts of some of the best gym and workout equipment, yoga clubs, tennis courts, basketball ground, billiards tables, an exclusive cards room and a small library. Indiranagar has the Defence Colony Playground, located next to the Defence Colony Children's Park and the Old People's Park; the Defence Colony Park maintained by DECORA is close by. In addition, Indiranagar is also famous for having a 100 ft. road, which has several high-end fashion brands as well as bars and pubs.

== Education ==
- National Public School, Indiranagar
- New Horizon Public School
- Shree Cauvery School
- Kairali Niketan Edu Trust
- SSB International School
- Sri Rakum School for the Blind

== Healthcare ==
- Chinmaya Mission Hospital
- Sir CV Raman General Hospital
- ESI Hospital
- Motherhood Maternity Hospital
- Apoorva Hospitals and Diagnostic Centre

== History ==
Indiranagar was formed as a BDA layout in the late 1970s, and was named after M.K. Indira In the beginning, the locality was primarily a suburb, dotted with large bungalows and independent houses, mostly owned by defence personnel and public sector employees.

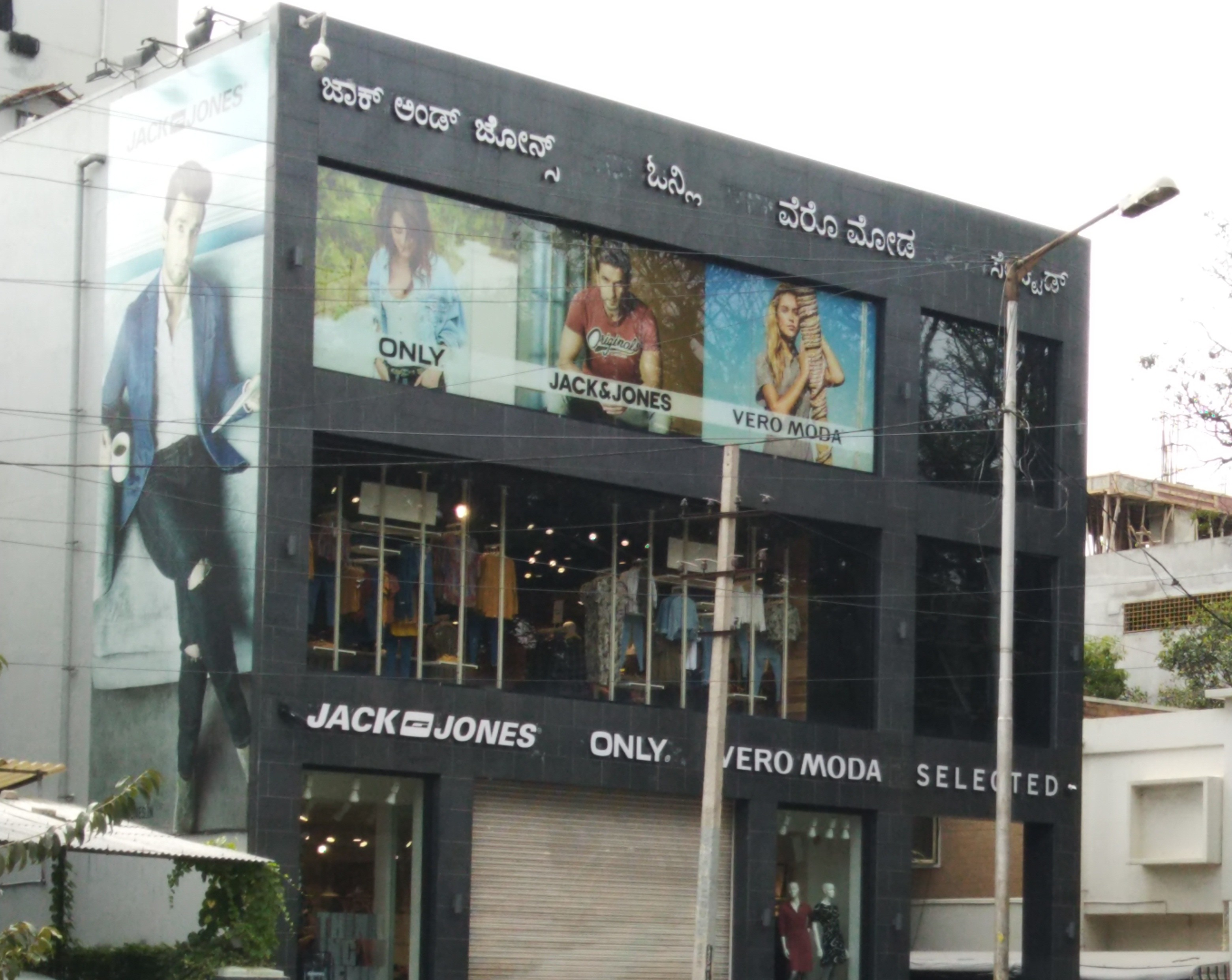
Jack & Jones store

The Information Technology boom in Bengaluru in the late 1990s converted Indiranagar and its two arterial roads (100 Feet Road and Chinmaya Mission Hospital Road) into a semi-commercial area. Today, Indiranagar is an important residential and commercial hub of Bengaluru.

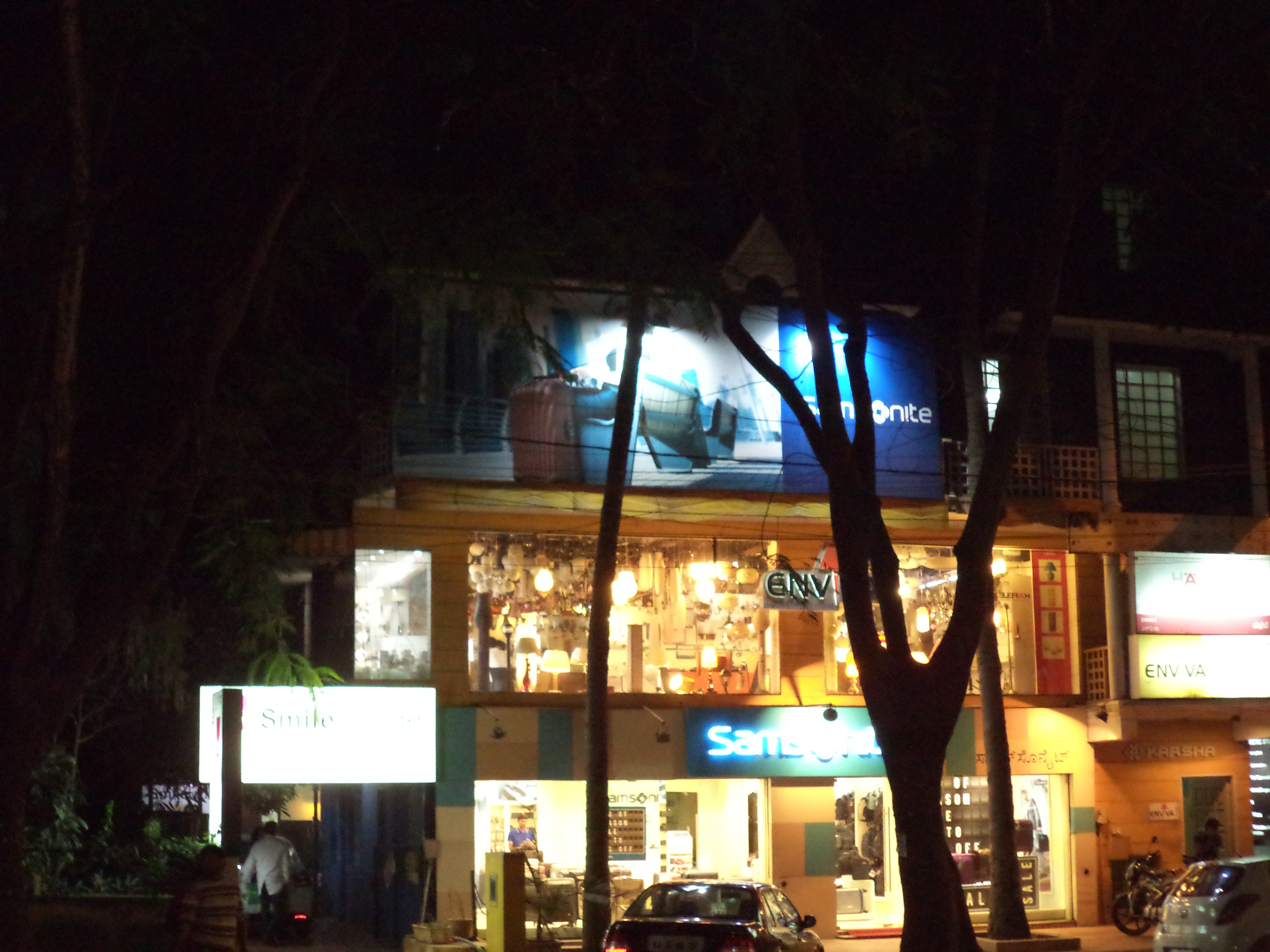
Hundred Feet Road, Indiranagar

Indiranagar is divided into 2 stages, with the 1st stage being the largest. The villages which existed prior to the formation of Indiranagar such as Binnamangala, Lakshmipuram, Motappapalya, Appareddy Palya, Doopanahalli, Kodihalli and Thippasandra as well as the neighbouring BDA layouts such as HAL 2nd Stage and HAL 3rd Stage are often considered as a part of Indiranagar.

== Localities ==
Localities of Indiranagar include Indiranagar 1st and 2nd stage, HAL 2nd and 3rd Stages, Doopanahalli, Motappapalya, Defence Colony, Kodihalli

== Transport ==
=== Metro ===
The Namma Metro Purple Line runs through Indiranagar and has two stations within the neighborhood –

- Indiranagar
- Swami Vivekananda Road.

It was the first section of the Bangalore metro to be operational.

=== Bus ===
Indiranagar is well connected to most areas of Bengaluru with the buses of the BMTC, which runs on 3 major roads of Indiranagar: CMH road, 80 feet road and 100 feet road.

CMH road:

1. Double road Indiranagar
2. Indiranagar Metro station
3. Indiranagar Police station/KFC signal
4. CMH hospital

80 ft Road:

1. Swami Vivekananda metro station
2. CMH hospital
3. Thippasandra

100 ft Road:

1. Binnamangala
2. Indiranagar Police station/KFC signal
3. 6th Main road
4. 12th Main road
5. New Horizon Public School
6. Domlur Flyover (Doopanahalli)

=== Airport ===
Kempegowda International Airport is the nearest airport to Indiranagar. The airport is located approximately 35 to 40 kilometers from Indiranagar which takes about 45 to 60 minutes via the airport road. BMTC operates KIA (Kempegowda International Airport) buses connecting the airport to various parts of Bengaluru, including routes near Indiranagar.

== Residents ==
- Rahul Dravid
- S. Raghu
- Dushyant Dubey
- Roger Binny
- Sanjjana
- Nithya Menen
