= Swami Vivekananda Road metro station =

Namma Metro's Purple Line metro station

Swami Vivekananda Road
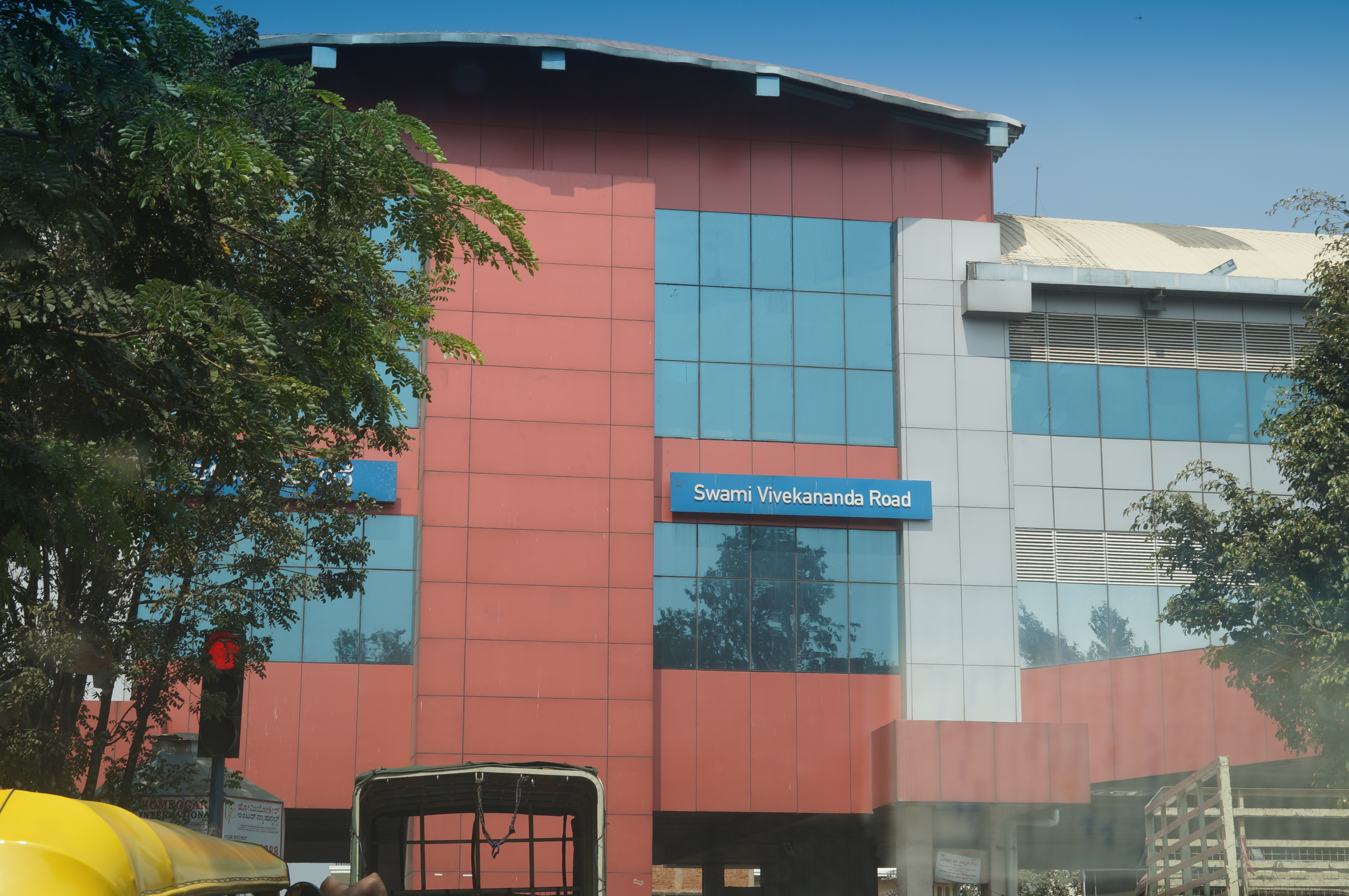
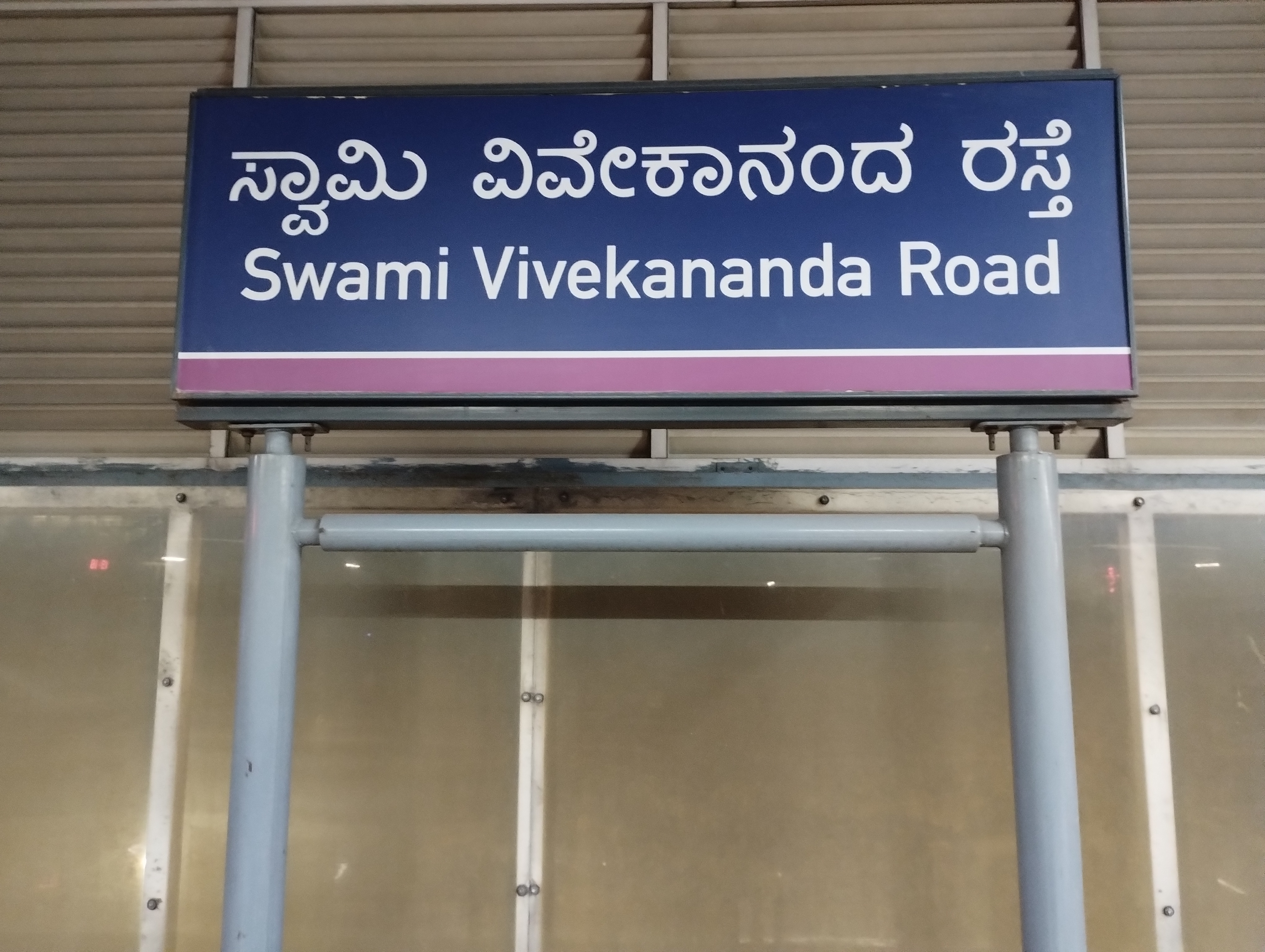
- From top to bottom: a view of the station from CV Raman hospital road signal, signage bearing the station's name on one of the platforms.

General information
- Location: Swami Vivekananda Road, New Baiyyappanahalli Extension, Sarvagnanagar, Bengaluru, Karnataka 560038; India
- Coordinates: 12°59′09″N 77°38′42″E
- System: Namma Metro station
- Owner: Bangalore Metro Rail Corporation Ltd (BMRCL)
- Operator: Namma Metro
- Line: Purple Line
- Platforms: Side platform Platform-1 → Whitefield (Kadugodi); Platform-2 → Challaghatta
- Tracks: 2

Construction
- Structure type: Elevated, Double Track
- Platform levels: 2
- Parking: Paid parking
- Cycle facilities: Parking available
- Accessible: Yes
- Architect: IVRCL

Other information
- Status: Staffed
- Station code: SVRD

History
- Opened: 20 October 2011; 14 years ago
- Electrified: 750 V DC third rail

Services
Preceding station	Namma Metro	Following station
Baiyappanahalli towards Whitefield (Kadugodi)	Purple Line	Indira Nagar towards Challaghatta
Route map
Location

Swami Vivekananda Road (commonly referred to as SV Road) is an elevated metro station on the east–west corridor of the Purple Line of Namma Metro in Bengaluru, India. It serves the localities of Thippasandra and Jeevan Bhima Nagar, and is also close to the Sir M. Visvesvaraya Terminal railway station.

== Station layout ==
P	Side Platform | Doors will open on the left
P	Platform 1 Eastbound	Towards → Whitefield (Kadugodi); Next Station: Baiyappanahalli
P	Platform 2 Westbound	Towards ← Challaghatta; Next Station: Indira Nagar
P	Side Platform | Doors will open on the left
C	Concourse	Fare control, station agent, Metro Card vending machines, crossover
G	Street level	Exit/Entrance

== See also ==
- Swami Vivekananda
- List of Namma Metro stations
- Transport in Karnataka
- List of metro systems
- List of rapid transit systems in India
- Bengaluru Metropolitan Transport Corporation
