= Halasuru Someshwara Temple =

Hindu Shiva temple in Bangalore, Karnataka, India

Halasuru Shri Someshwaraswami Temple
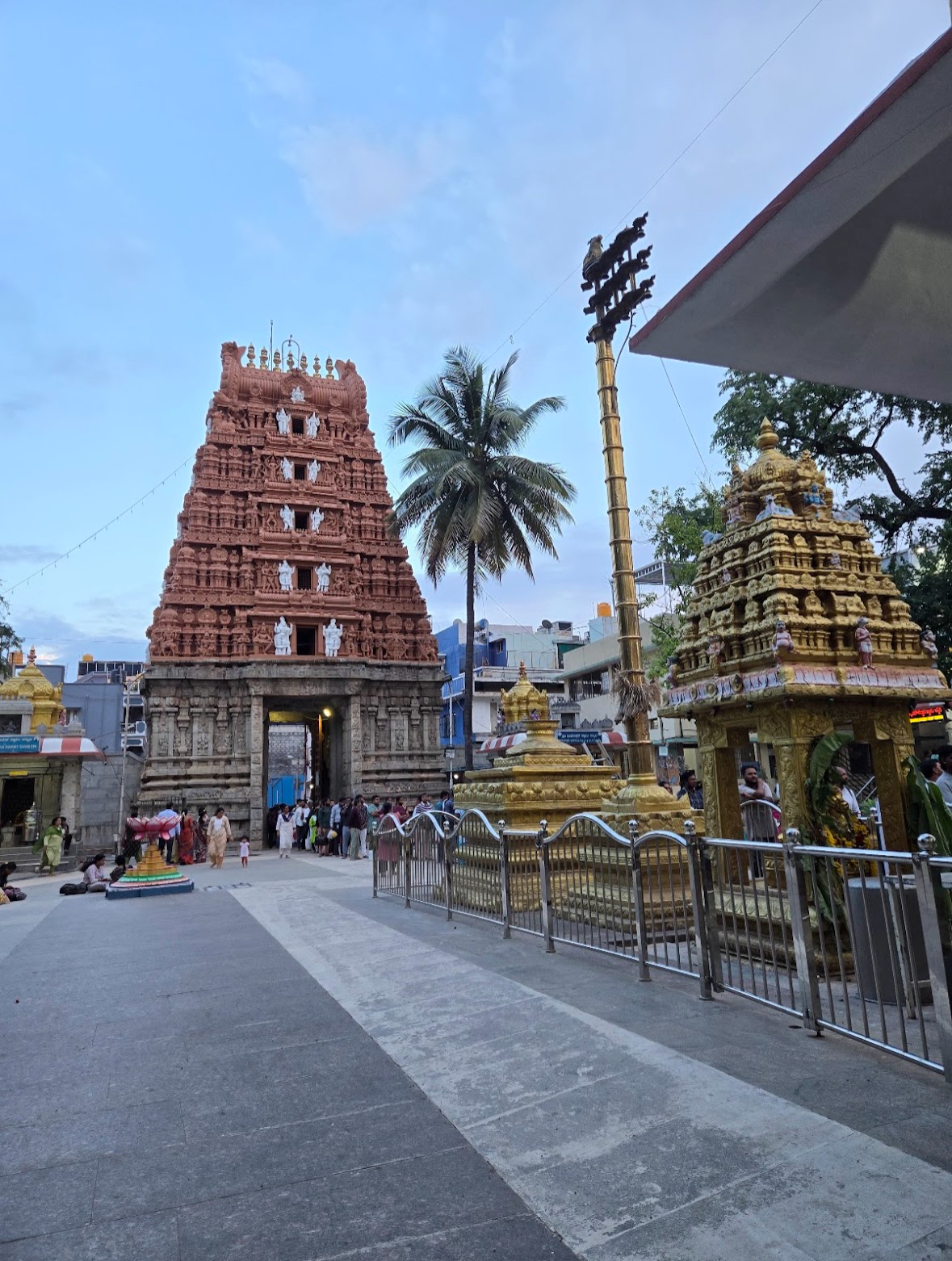
- The entrance of Someshwara temple

- Location in Karnataka

Religion
- Affiliation: Hinduism
- District: Bangalore
- Deity: Someshwara

Location
- Location: Halasuru
- State: Karnataka
- Country: India
- Coordinates: 12.975445°N 77.624231°E

Halasuru Someshwara Temple is a Hindu temple, located in the neighborhood of Halasuru in Bangalore, Karnataka, India. It is one of the old temples in the city, dating back to the Chola period, and it is dedicated to the Hindu god Shiva. Major additions or modifications were made during the late Vijayanagara Empire period under the rule of Hiriya Kempe Gowda II.

Someshwara temples were built by the Cholas in Karnataka. During that period, we see Tamil inscriptions as a few Mudaliars (Tuluva Vellala) were settled. These Mudaliars had settled in parts of TN especially Arcot. The temple is being managed by the Muzarai department.

The archakas are from the Dikshit community. It is one of the oldest and biggest temples of Bengaluru. The main festivals are Mahashivaratri, Brahmotsavam, and Karthika Somawaram. Other festivals include Annabhishekam, Shiva Deepam, Ardra Darshanam, Sankranthi, Yugadi, and Navarathri. Anna prasadam is provided every Monday. During shivaratri the temple hosts more than 100,000 visitors. The vahanas ("vehicles") at the temple include the bull, adhikaranandi, elephant, mouse, peacock, goat and snake, while a silver chariot is a recent addition. Statues of the presiding divine couple are seated on a vahana or chariot which is brought in a procession around the temple while the temple band plays music

== History ==
In the "Gazetter of Mysore" (1887), Benjamin Lewis Rice describes a legend behind the consecration of the temple. Kempe Gowda, while on a hunt, rode far away from his capital Yalahanka. Being tired, he rested under a tree and fell asleep. The local deity Someshwara appeared to him in a dream and instructed him to build a temple in his honor using buried treasure. In return the chieftain would receive divine favor. Kempe Gowda found the treasure and dutifully completed the temple.

According to another version of the legend, King Jayappa Gowda (1420-1450 CE) from a minor dynasty of the Yelahanka Nada Prabhus was hunting in a forest near the present Halasuru area, when he felt tired and relaxed under a tree. In a dream, a man appeared before him and told him that a linga (universal symbol of the god Shiva) was buried under the spot where he was sleeping. He was instructed to retrieve it and build a temple. Jayappa found the treasure and initially built the temple out of wood.

Another account attributes the temple to the Chola Dynasty with later renovations made by the Yelahanka Nada Prabhus. The Kamakshi temple was built by the Mysore Maharajas. However, even before them, Adi Shankaracharya established a Shri Chakra there.

== Structure ==
According to Michell, the temple plan follows many of the basic elements of Vijayanagara architecture though at a lower scale. The temple has a square sanctum (garbhagriha) which is surrounded by a narrow passageway. The sanctum is connected to a closed mantapa (hall) whose walls are decorated with pilasters and sculptures in frieze. The closed mantapa is connected to a spacious open mantapa consisting of four large projecting "bays" (area between four pillars). The piers leading to the sanctum and those facing outward from the open mantapa are the standard Yali (mythical beast) pillars. The eastern gopuram is a well-executed, typical 16th century structure. The brahma samba is located in the east direction of the temple which is about 18 feet in height and has the base radius of 2 feet.

There are several notable sculptures and decorative features in the complex. An impressive pillar (kambha or nandi) pillar) stands near the tall tower over the entrance gate (gopura). The tower itself exhibits well sculptured images of gods and goddesses from Hindu mythology. The open mantapa consists of forty-eight pillars with carvings of divinities in frieze. To the north is the navagraha temple (shrine for the nine planets) with twelve pillars, each pillar representing a saint (rishi). The entrance to the sanctum exhibits sculptures of two "door keepers" (dvarapalakas). Other notable works of art include sculptures that depict King Ravana lifting Mount Kailash in a bid to appease the god Shiva, Durga slaying Mahishasura (a demon), images of the Nayanmar saints (Tamil Shaivaite saints), depictions of the Girija Kalyana (marriage of Parvati to the god Shiva), the saptarishis (seven sages of Hindu lore). Recent excavations at the temple site has revealed the existence of a temple tank (kalyani) which could be 1200 years old. There are other shrines dedicated to Ganapathi, Bhimeshwara, Nanjundeshwara, Arunachaleshwara, Chandramouleeshwara, Kamakshi, Vishnu, Navagraha etc.

== Gallery ==
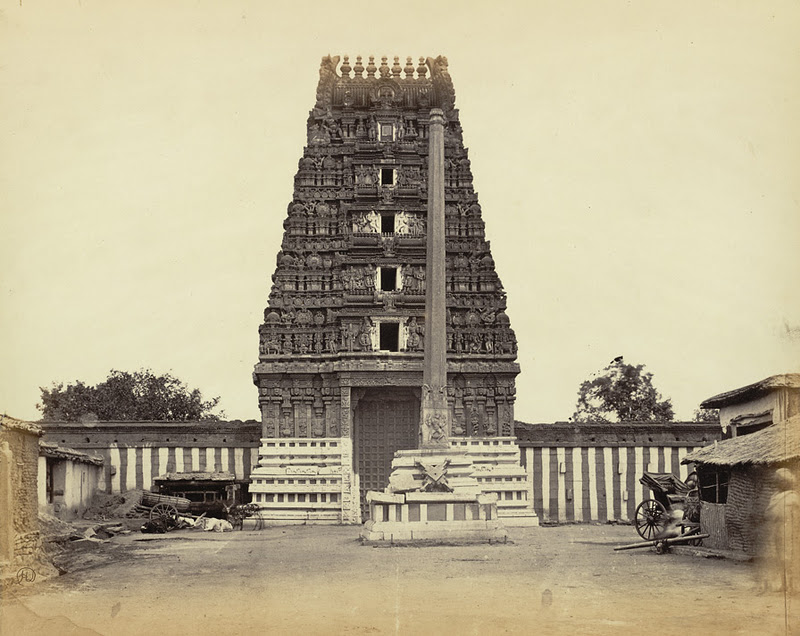
Entrance gopura or gateway of the Ulsoor temple in Bangalore (c.1868), by Henry Dixon, from the Archaeological Survey of India Collections

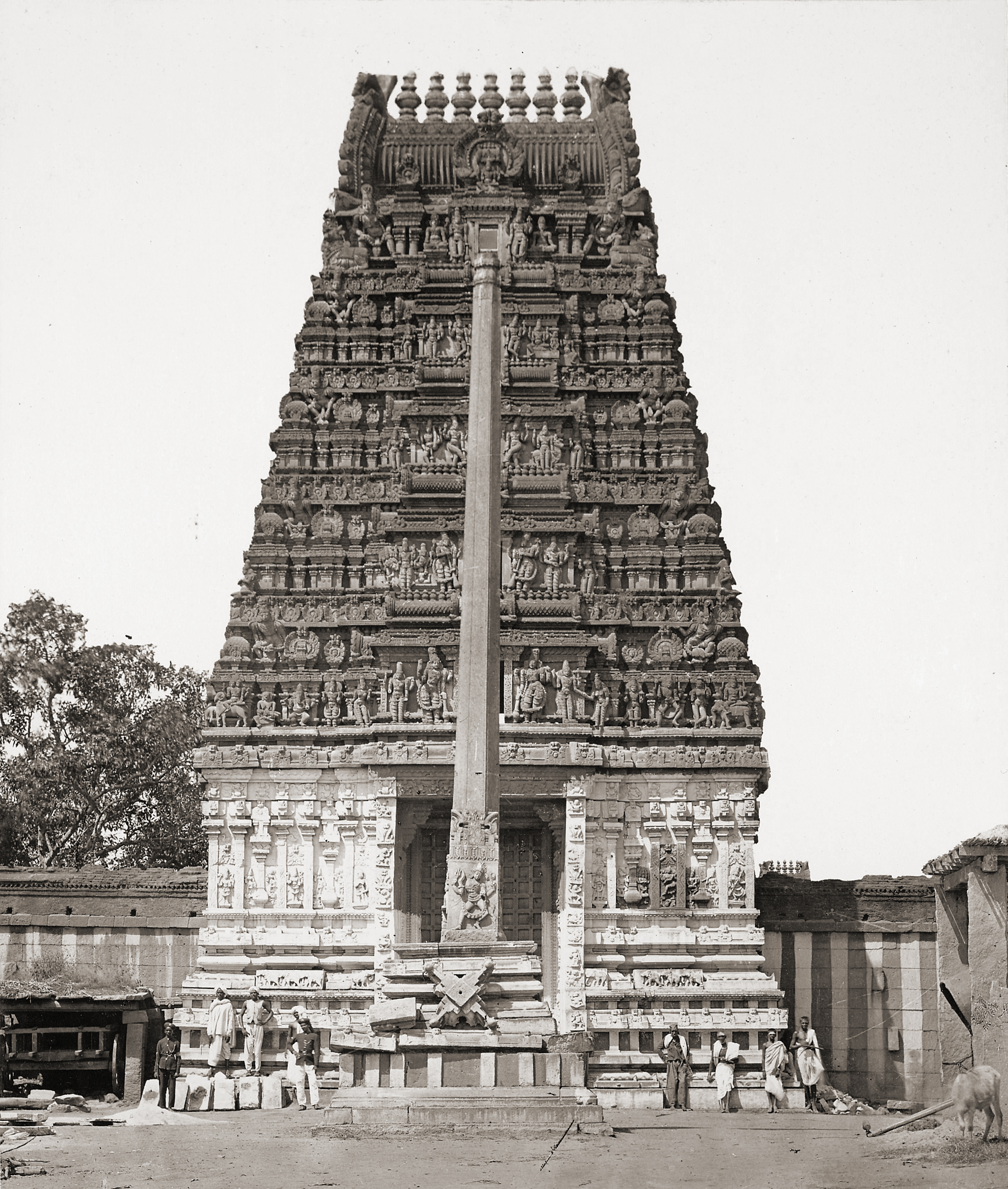
Someshwara temple in 1890

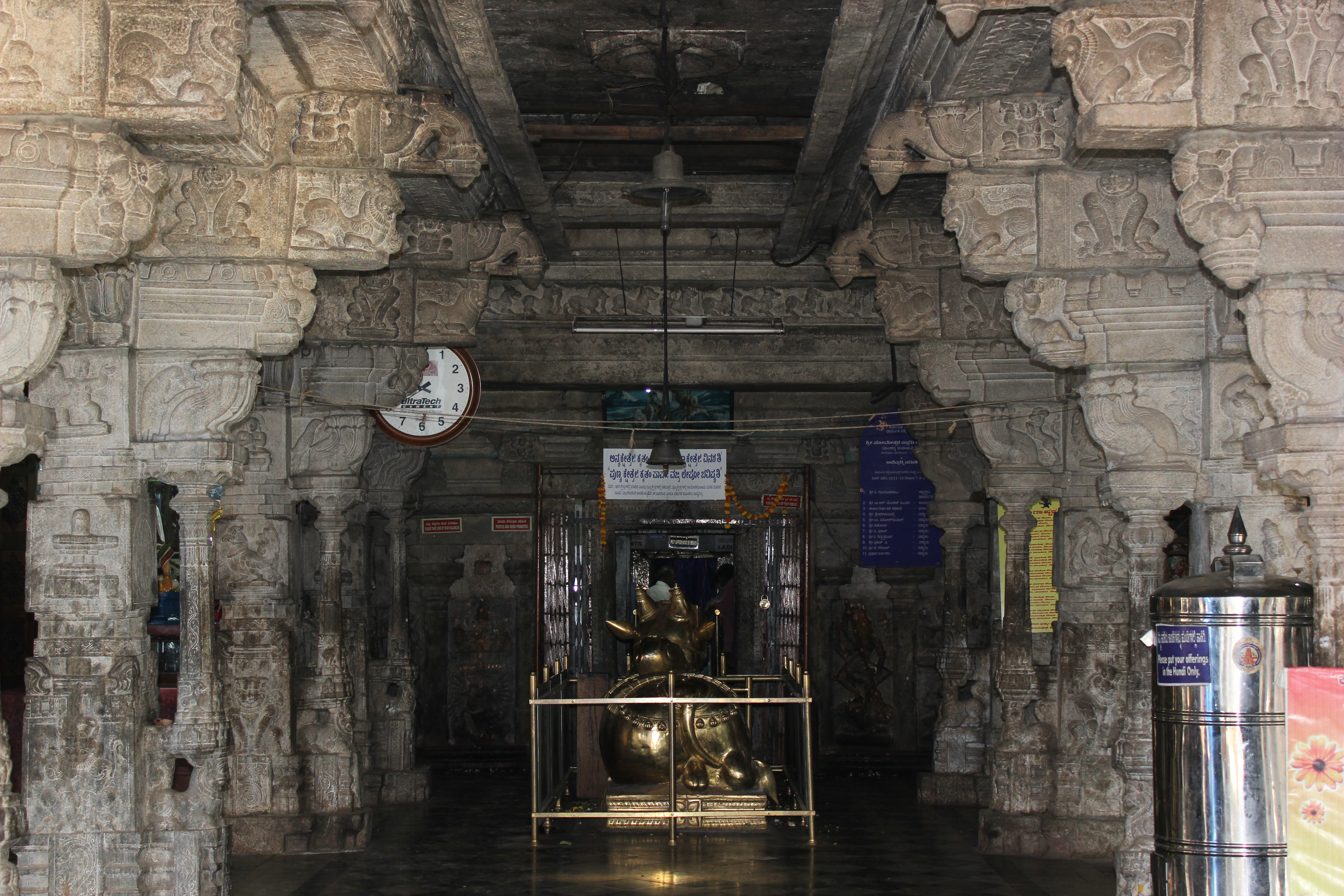
Ornate open mantapa (hall) at the Someshwara temple in Halasuru

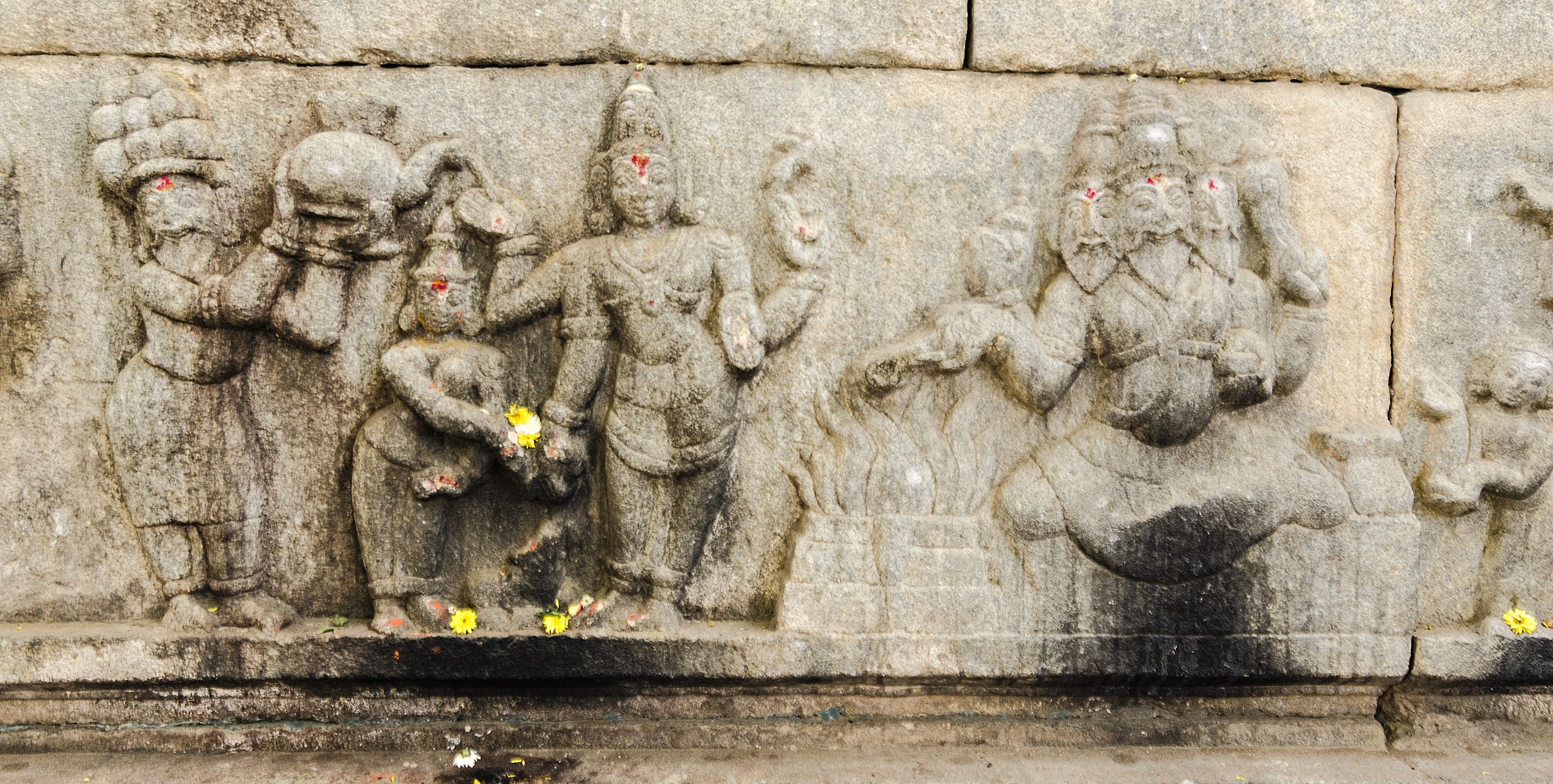
Depiction of the Girija Kalyana (marriage of Parvati to the god Shiva

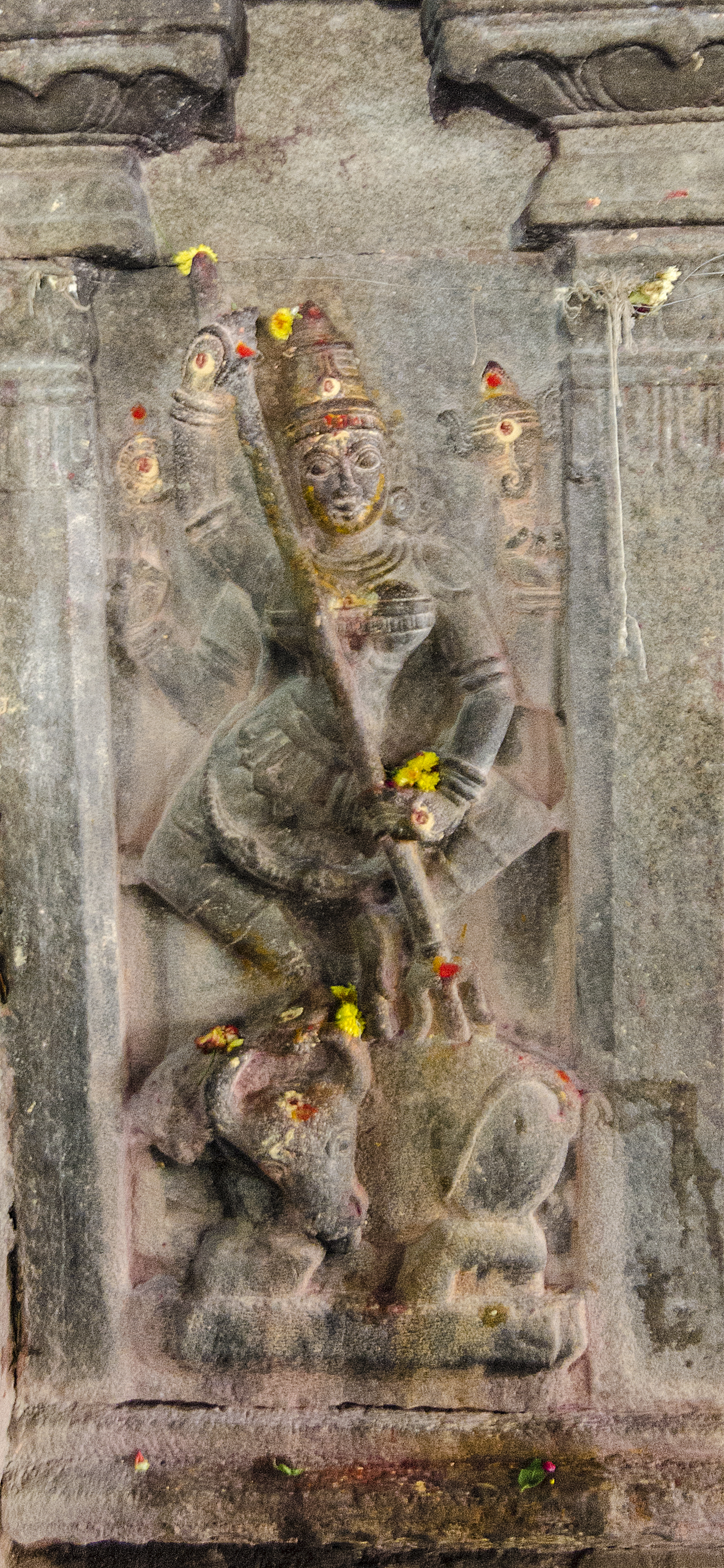
Durga slaying Mahishasura (a demon)

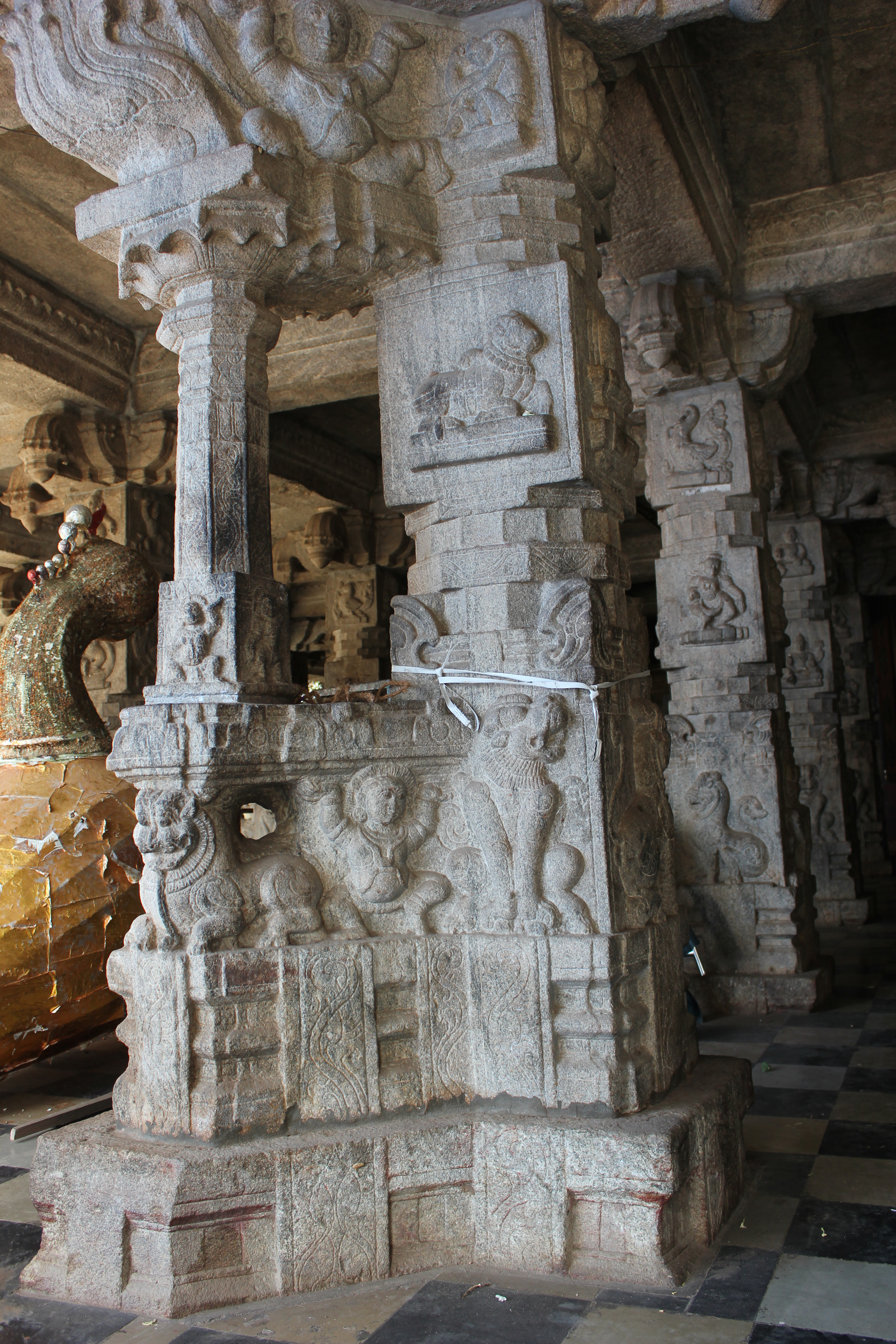
Mantapa pillars at Someshwara temple in Halasuru

== Inscriptions ==
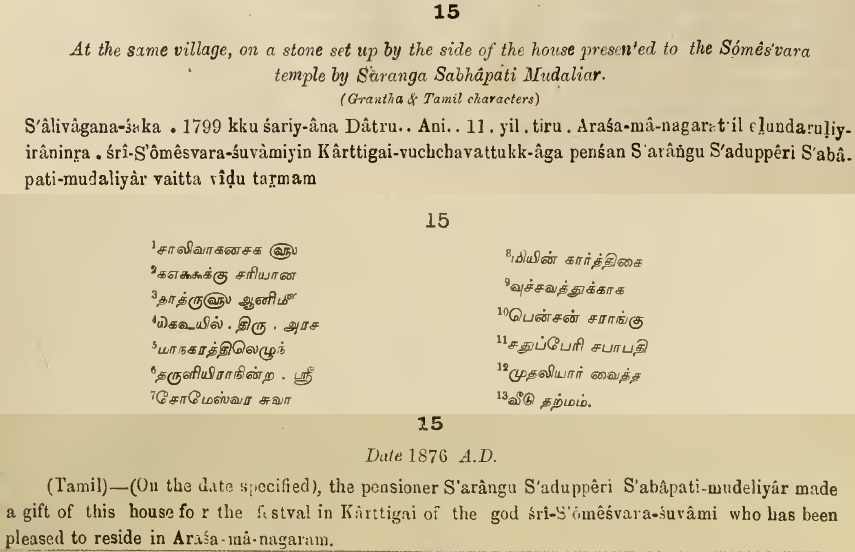
Ulsoor Someshwara Temple, Tamil Inscription BN-15

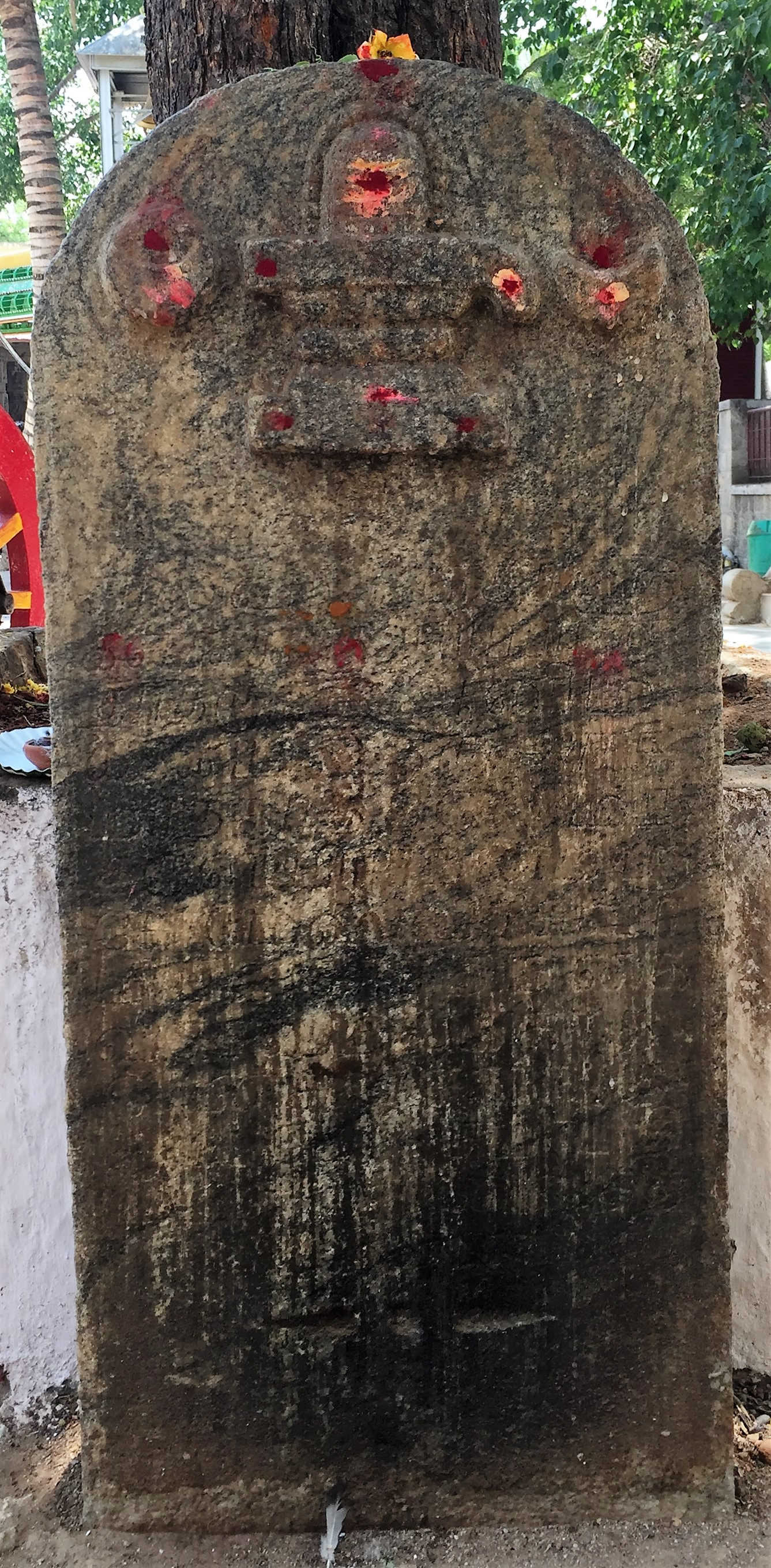
Tamil Inscription, Someshwara Temple, Ulsoor
