= Singasandra metro station =

Namma Metro's Yellow Line metro station

Singasandra
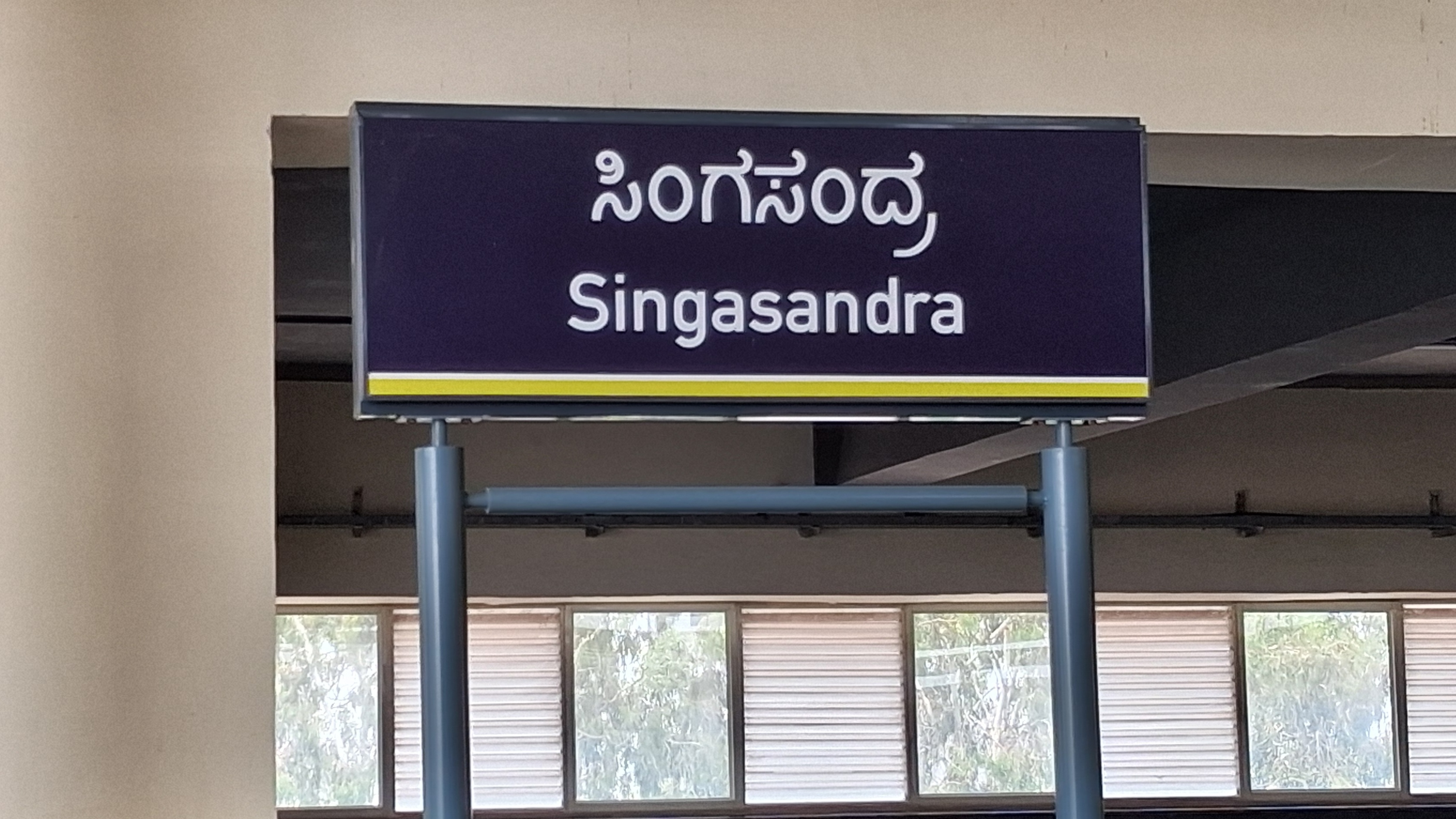
- Station Board of this metro station as of April 2026

General information
- Location: Wellington Paradise, Begur, Bengaluru, Karnataka 560068
- Coordinates: 12.88069°N 77.64498°E
- System: Namma Metro station
- Owner: Bangalore Metro Rail Corporation Ltd (BMRCL)
- Operator: Namma Metro
- Line: Yellow Line
- Platforms: Side platform Platform-1 → Rashtreeya Vidyalaya Road; Platform-2 → Delta Electronics Bommasandra
- Tracks: 2

Construction
- Structure type: Elevated, Double track
- Platform levels: 2
- Parking: Two-Wheeler Parking only
- Accessible: Yes
- Architect: ITD - ITD Cementations India JV

Other information
- Status: Operational and Staffed
- Station code: CKBR

History
- Opened: 10 August 2025; 12 months ago
- Electrified: 750 V DC third rail

Services
Preceding station	Namma Metro	Following station
Kudlu Gate towards Rashtreeya Vidyalaya Road	Yellow Line	Hosa Road towards Delta Electronics Bommasandra
Route map
Location

Singasandra is an elevated metro station on the north–south corridor of the Yellow Line of Namma Metro in Bengaluru, India.

== History ==
In December 2016, the Bangalore Metro Rail Corporation Limited (BMRCL) issued a call for bids to construct the Singasandra metro station along the 6.385 km Reach 5 – Package 2 section (Hosa Road - Bommanahalli) of the 18.825 km Yellow Line of Namma Metro. On 25 April 2017, ITD-ITD Cementation JV was selected as the lowest bidder for this stretch, with their bid closely aligning with the original cost estimates. Consequently, the contract was successfully awarded to the company, which then commenced construction of the metro station in accordance with the agreements.

The Yellow Line began operations from 10 August 2025 and has been officially inaugurated by Prime Minister Narendra Modi, with four trainsets which are ready for operations after arriving from Titagarh Rail Systems in Kolkata. The opening was delayed from May 2025 as previously announced by the Namma Metro Managing Director, Maheshwar Rao.

== Station layout ==
G	Street level	Exit/Entrance
L1	Mezzanine	Fare control, station agent, Metro Card vending machines, crossover
L2	Side platform | Doors will open on the left
L2	Platform 2 Southbound	Towards → Delta Electronics Bommasandra; Next Station: Hosa Road
L2	Platform 1 Northbound	Towards ← Rashtreeya Vidyalaya Road; Next Station: Kudlu Gate
L2	Side platform | Doors will open on the left
L2

== Entry/Exits ==
There are three entry/exit points – A, B and C. Commuters can use either of the points for their travel.

== Gallery ==
Here are some of the metro station captures shown below:-

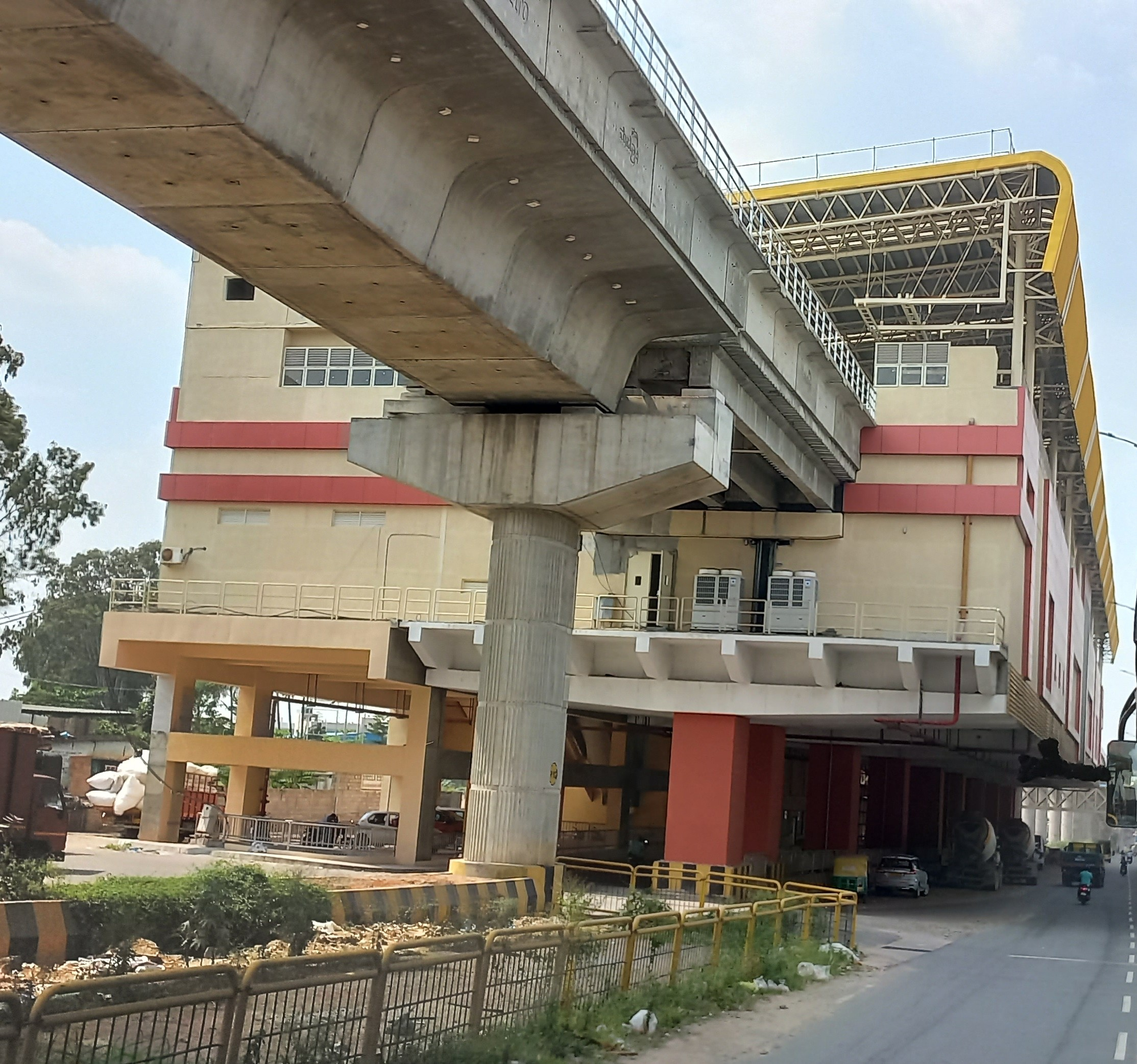
This metro station on U/C as of September 2023

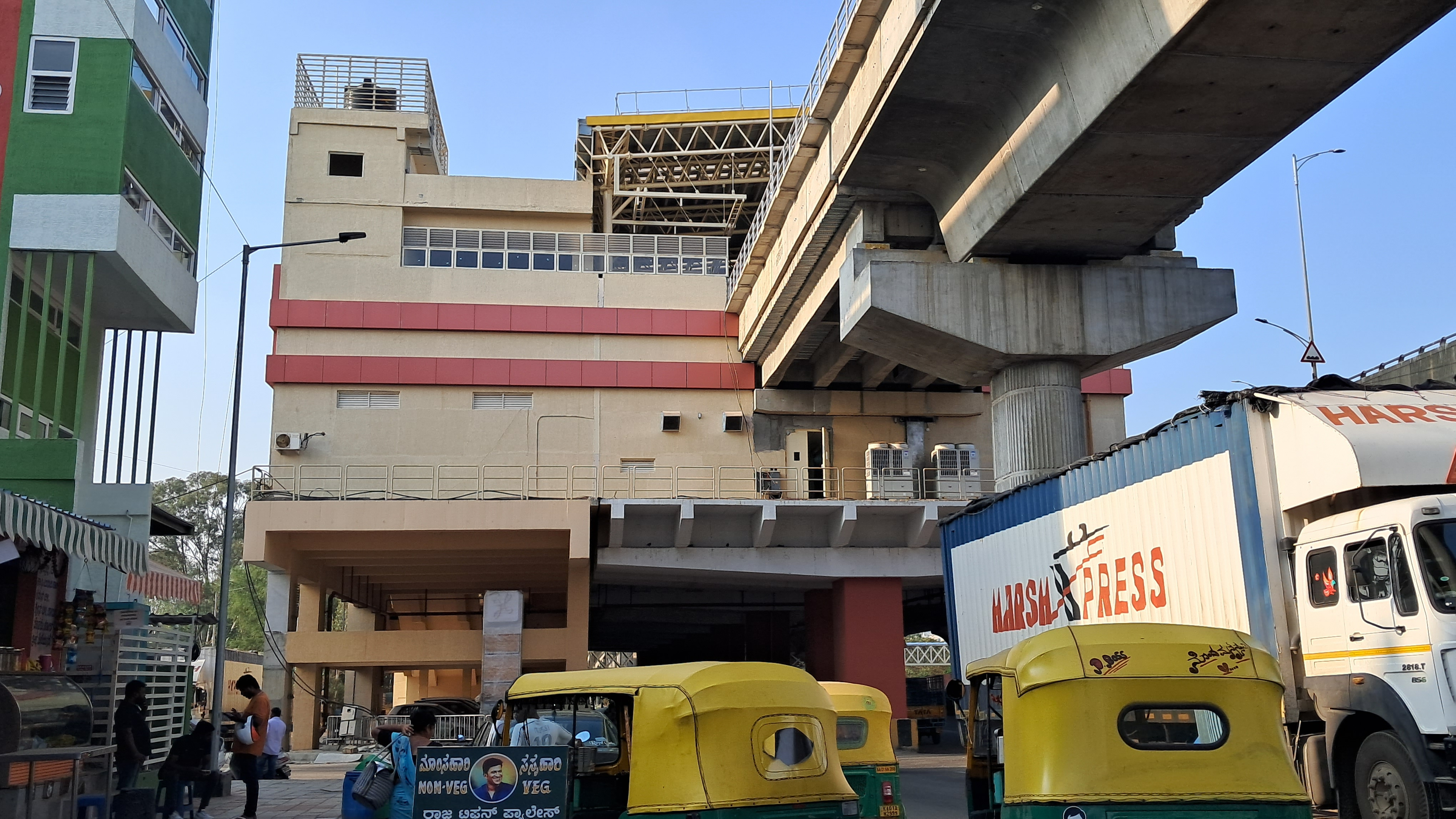
This metro station on U/C as of December 2023

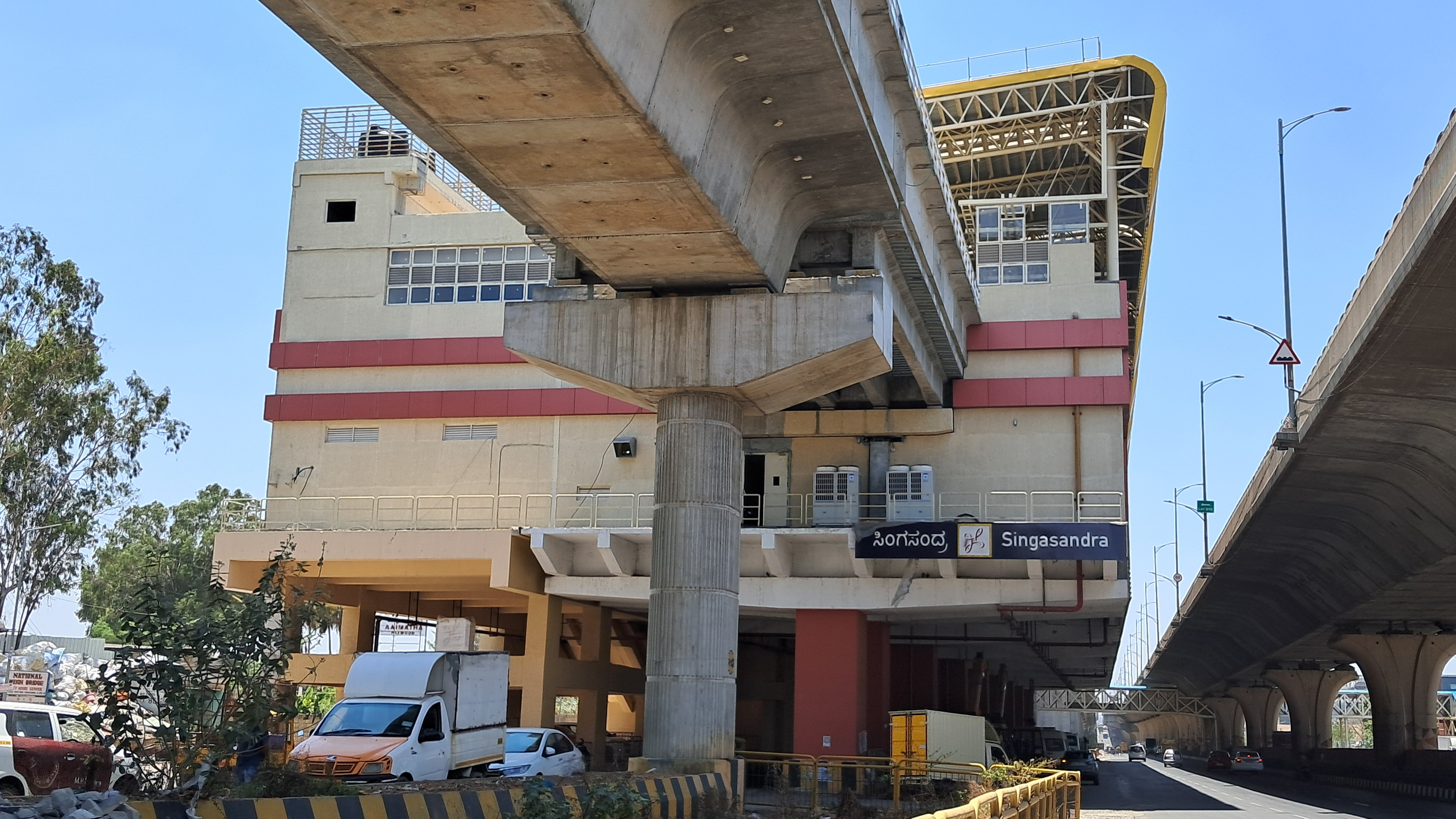
Installation of the station name board as in April 2024

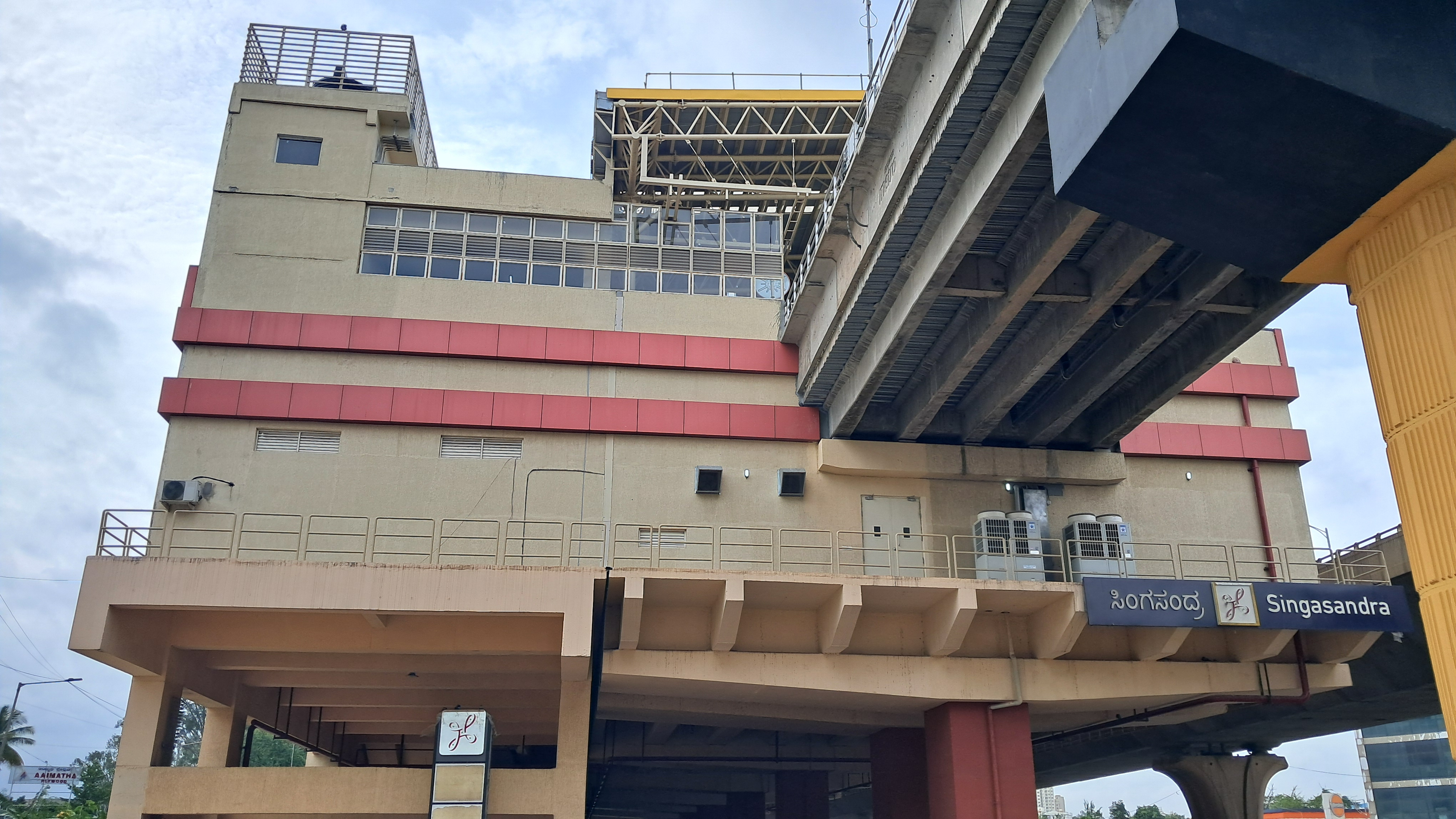
Close-Up view of this metro station as of July 2025

== See also ==
- Bengaluru
- List of Namma Metro stations
- Transport in Karnataka
- List of metro systems
- List of rapid transit systems in India
