= Electronic City metro station =

Namma Metro's Yellow Line metro station

Electronic City
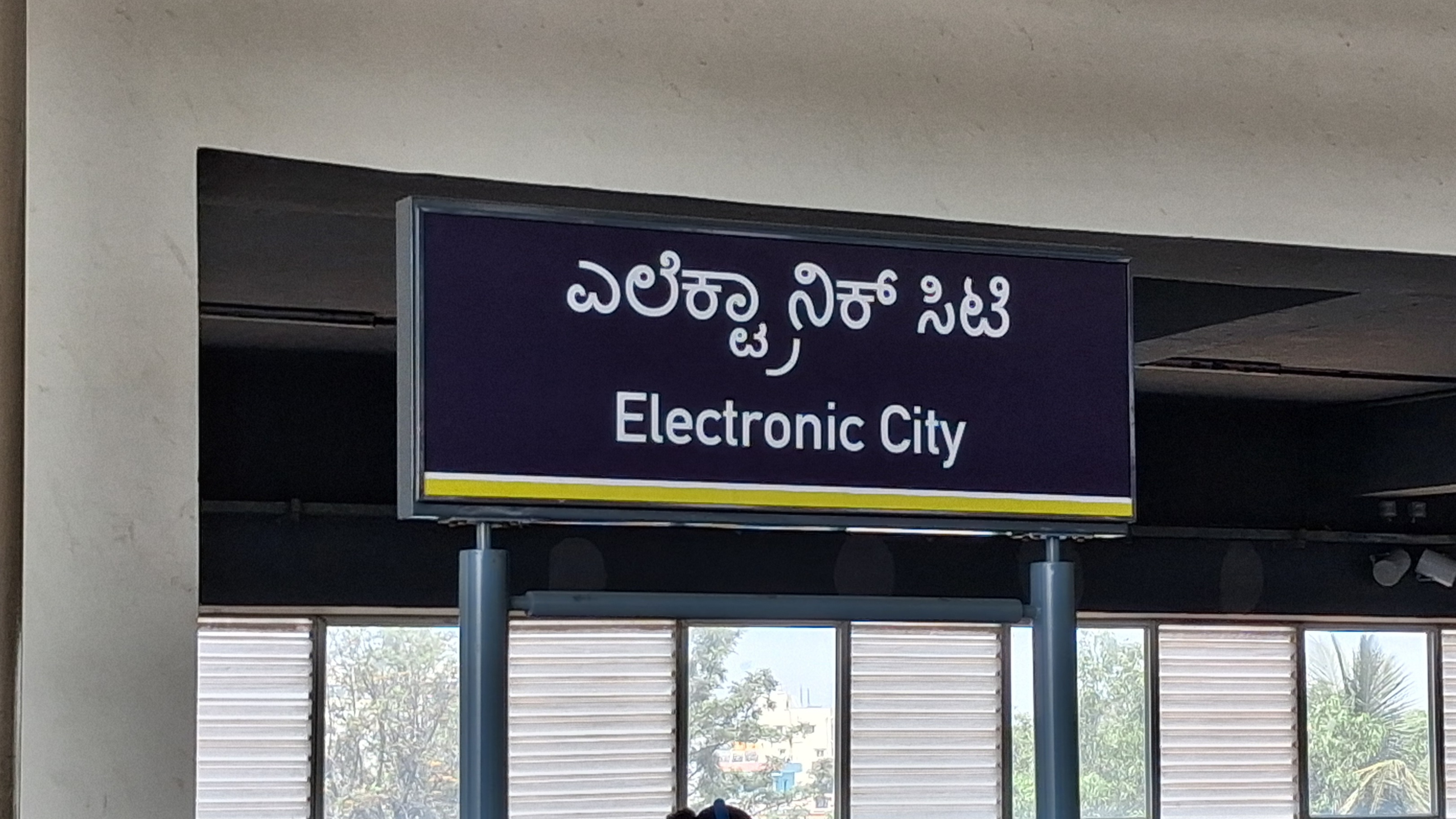
- Station Board of this metro station as of April 2026

General information
- Location: 378, Electronic City Phase 1, Electronic City, Bengaluru, Karnataka 560100
- Coordinates: 12.84649°N 77.67112°E
- System: Namma Metro station
- Owner: Namma Metro
- Operator: Bangalore Metro Rail Corporation Ltd (BMRCL)
- Line: Yellow Line
- Platforms: Side platform Platform-1 → Rashtreeya Vidyalaya Road; Platform-2 → Delta Electronics Bommasandra
- Tracks: 2

Construction
- Structure type: Elevated, Double track
- Platform levels: 2
- Parking: (TBC)
- Accessible: Yes
- Architect: ITD - ITD Cementation India JV

Other information
- Status: Operational and Staffed
- Station code: ETCT

History
- Opened: 10 August 2025; 12 months ago
- Electrified: 750 V DC third rail

Services
Preceding station	Namma Metro	Following station
Beratena Agrahara towards Rashtreeya Vidyalaya Road	Yellow Line	Infosys Foundation Konappana Agrahara towards Delta Electronics Bommasandra
Route map
Location

Electronic City is an elevated metro station on the Yellow Line of the Namma Metro in Bengaluru, India, built to serve the information technology hub in the Anekal suburban area. Near the metro station is the Electronic City Elevated Expressway connecting Central Silk Board to Electronic City, including the Infosys campus and the Wipro Floating Learning Centre.

== History ==
In December 2016, the Bangalore Metro Rail Corporation Limited (BMRCL) issued a call for bids to construct the Electronic City metro station along the 6.418 km Reach 5 – Package 1 section (Bommasandra - Hosa Road) of the 18.825 km Yellow Line of Namma Metro. On 25 March 2017, ITD-ITD Cementation JV was selected as the lowest bidder for this stretch, with their bid closely aligning with the original cost estimates. Consequently, the contract was successfully awarded to the company, which then commenced construction of the metro station in accordance with the agreements.

The Yellow Line began operations from 10 August 2025 and has been officially inaugurated by Prime Minister Narendra Modi, with four trainsets which are ready for operations after arriving from Titagarh Rail Systems in Kolkata. The opening was delayed from May 2025 as previously announced by the Namma Metro Managing Director, Maheshwar Rao.

== Station layout ==
G	Street level	Exit/Entrance
L1	Mezzanine	Fare control, station agent, Metro Card vending machines, crossover
L2	Side platform | Doors will open on the left
L2	Platform 2 Southbound	Towards → Delta Electronics Bommasandra; Next Station: Infosys Foundation Konappana Agrahara
L2	Platform 1 Northbound	Towards ← Rashtreeya Vidyalaya Road; Next Station: Beratena Agrahara
L2	Side platform | Doors will open on the left
L2

== Gallery ==
Here are some of the metro station captures shown below:-

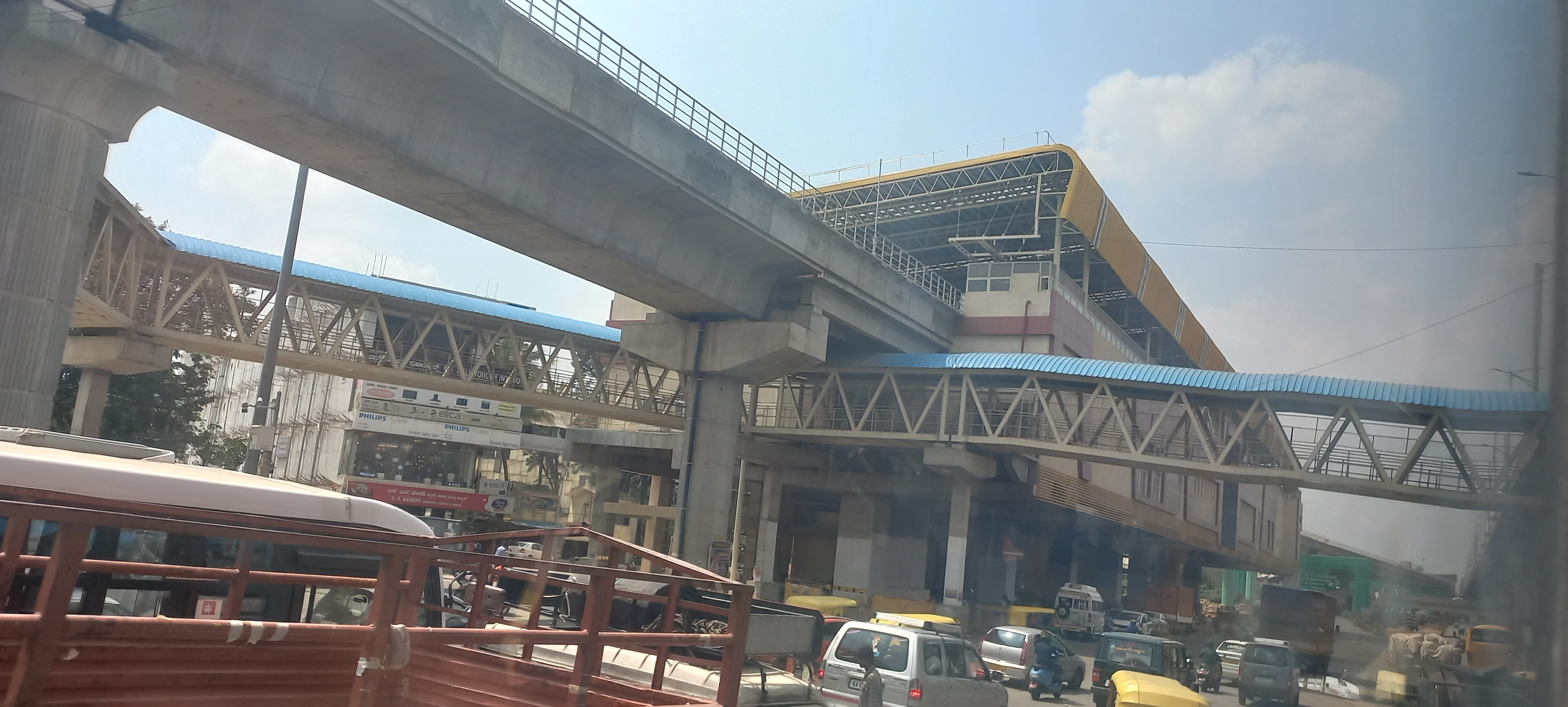
This metro station on U/C as of September 2023

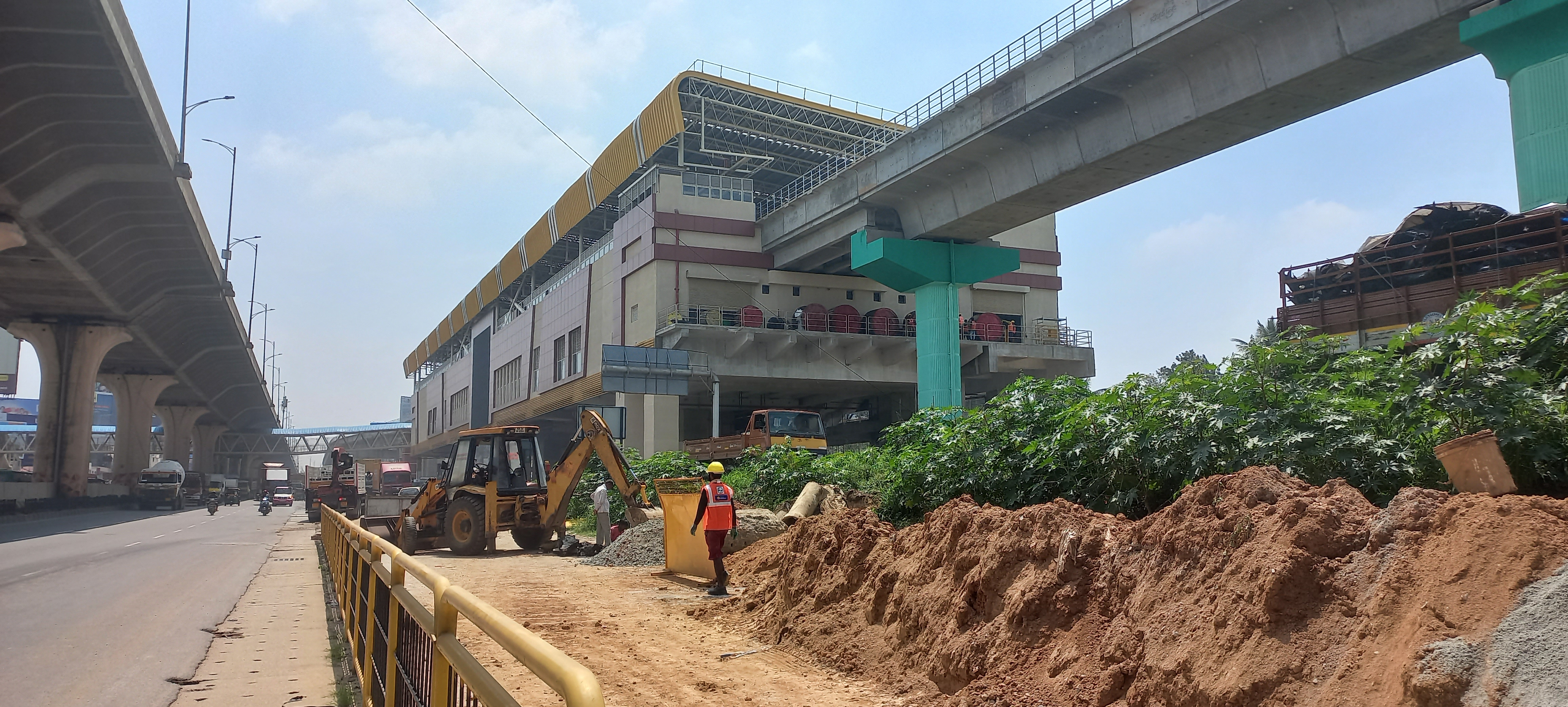
This metro station on U/C as of October 2023

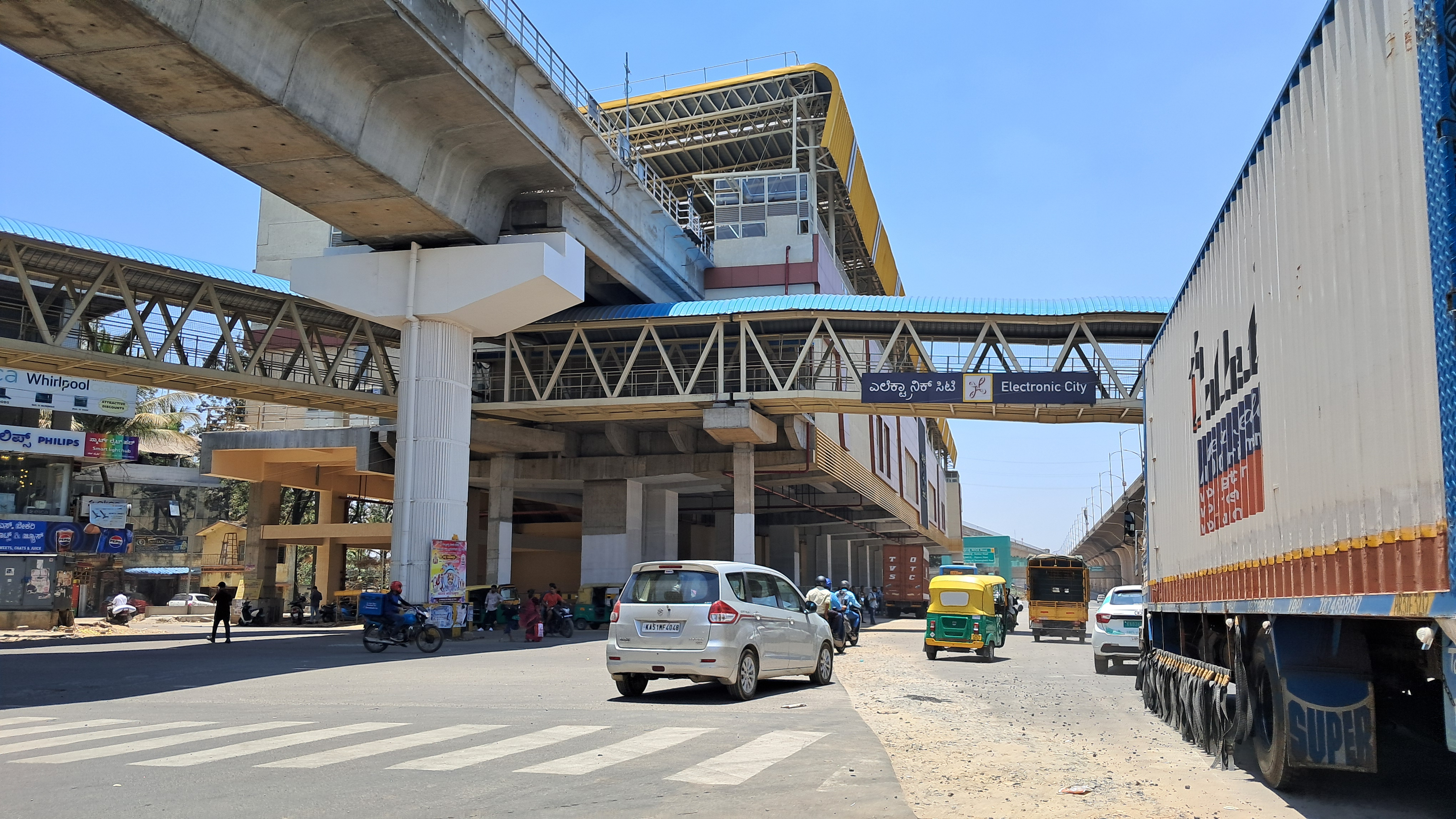
Installation of the station name board as of April 2024

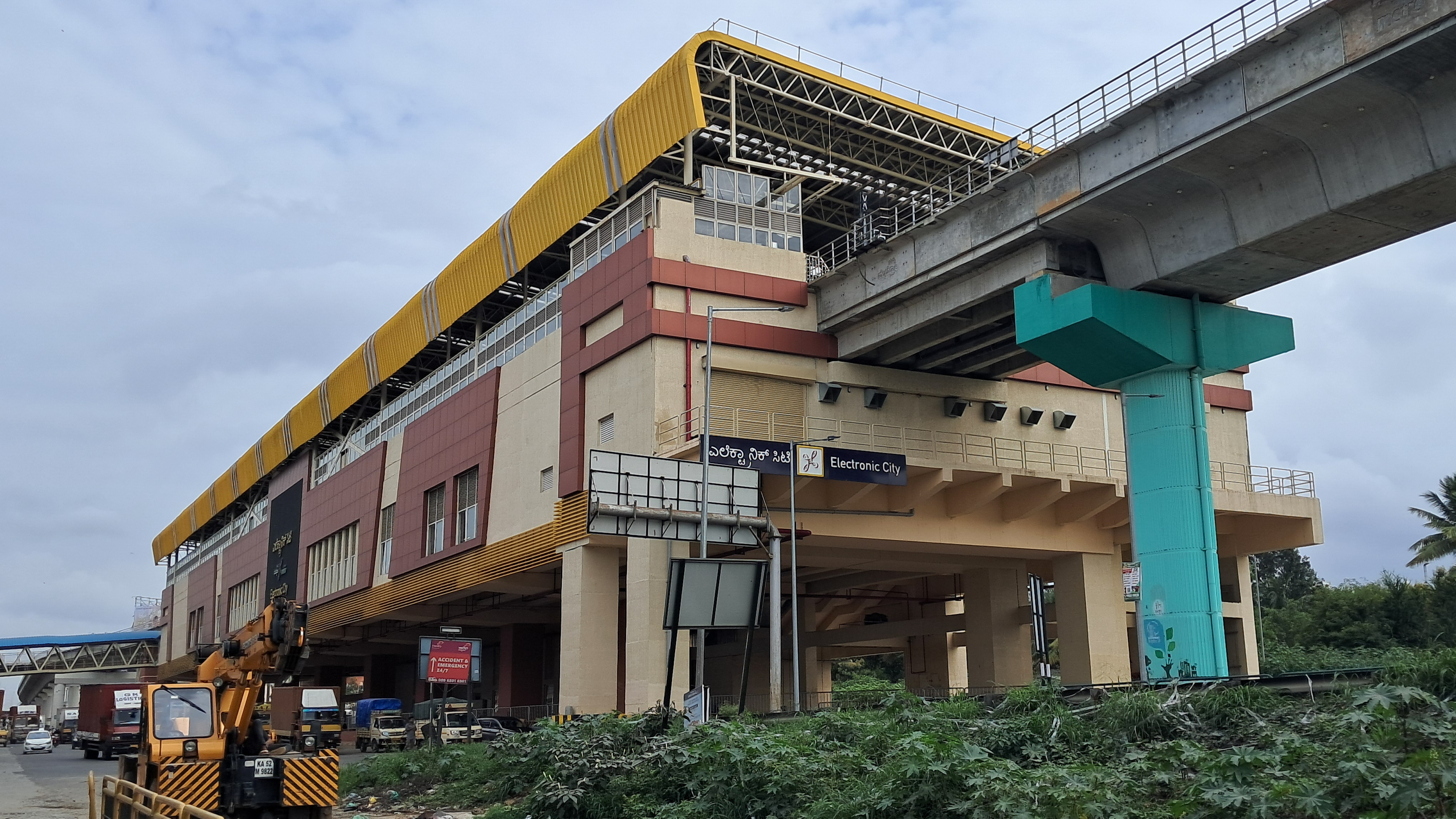
Fully completed road-side view of this metro station as of July 2025

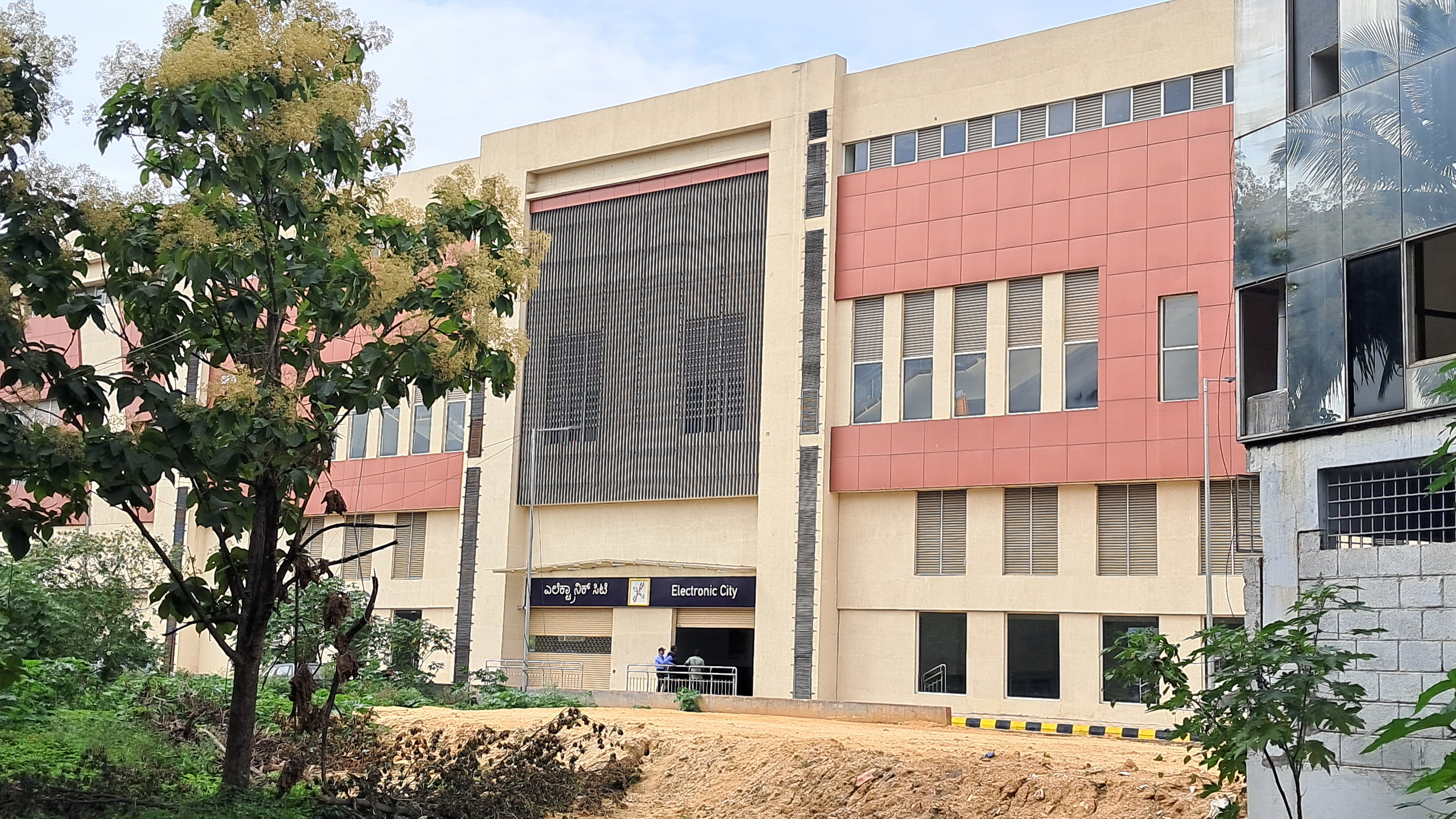
Fully constructed metro station as of July 2025

== See also ==
- Electronic City
- Bengaluru
- List of Namma Metro stations
- Transport in Karnataka
- List of metro systems
- List of rapid transit systems in India
- Bengaluru Metropolitan Transport Corporation
