= Kudlu Gate metro station =

Namma Metro's Yellow Line metro station

Kudlu Gate
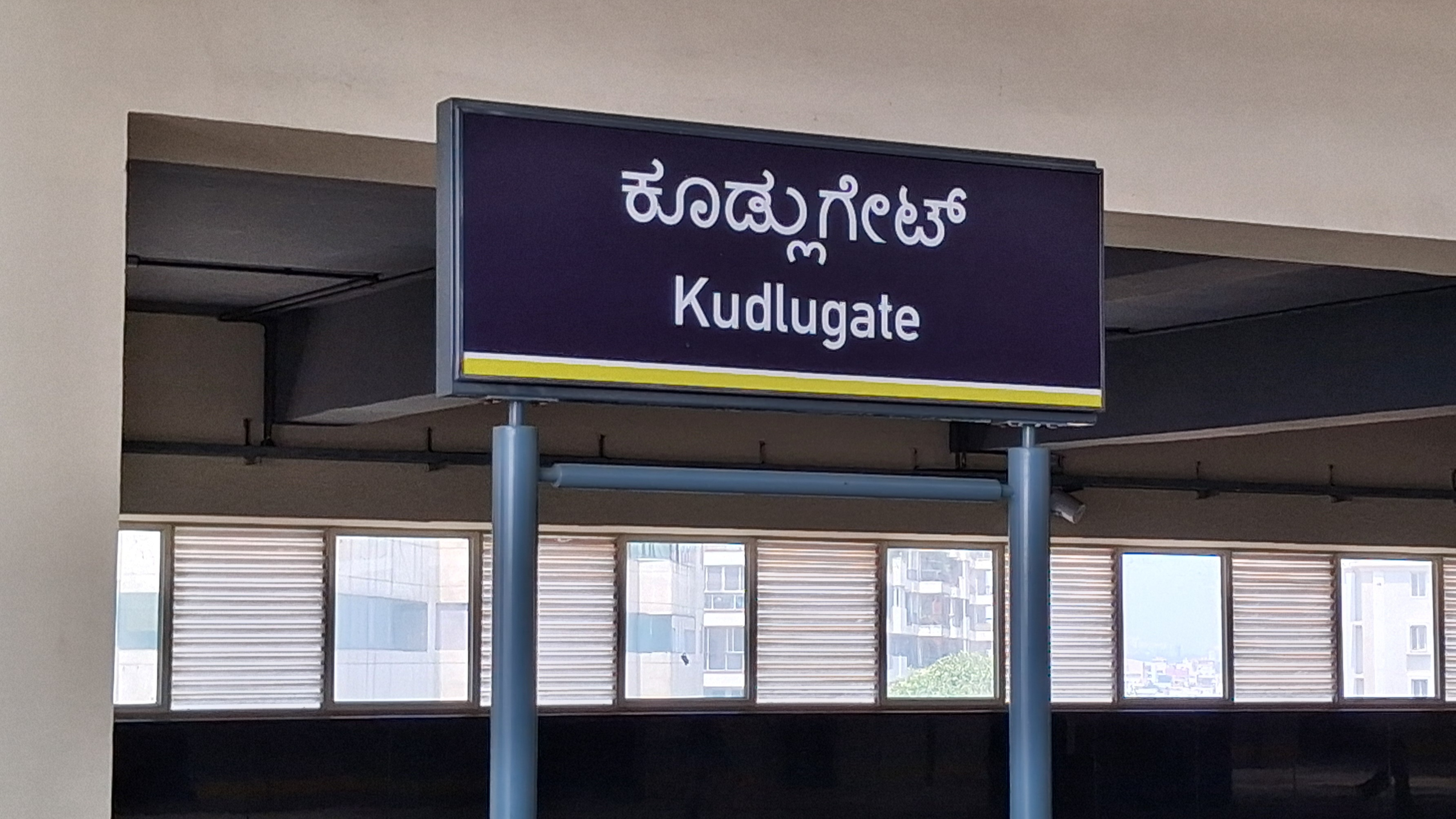
- Station Board of this metro station as of April 2026

General information
- Location: Hosur Rd, Kudlu Gate, Industrial Layout, Singasandra, Bengaluru, Karnataka 560068
- Coordinates: 12.88992°N 77.63929°E
- System: Namma Metro station
- Owner: Bangalore Metro Rail Corporation Ltd (BMRCL)
- Operator: Namma Metro
- Line: Yellow Line
- Platforms: Side platform Platform-1 → Rashtreeya Vidyalaya Road; Platform-2 → Delta Electronics Bommasandra
- Tracks: 2

Construction
- Structure type: Elevated, Double track
- Platform levels: 2
- Parking: Two-Wheeler Parking only
- Accessible: Yes
- Architect: ITD - ITD Cementation India JV

Other information
- Status: Operational and Staffed
- Station code: MSRN

History
- Opened: 10 August 2025; 12 months ago
- Electrified: 750 V DC third rail

Services
| Preceding station | Namma Metro | Following station |
|---|---|---|
| Hongasandra towards Rashtreeya Vidyalaya Road | Yellow Line | Singasandra towards Delta Electronics Bommasandra |
Route map
Location

Kudlu Gate is an elevated metro station on the North-South corridor of the Yellow Line of Namma Metro in Bengaluru, India.

== History ==
In December 2016, the Bangalore Metro Rail Corporation Limited (BMRCL) issued a call for bids to construct the Kudlu Gate metro station along the 6.385 km Reach 5 – Package 2 section (Hosa Road - Bommanahalli) of the 18.825 km Yellow Line of Namma Metro. On 25 April 2017, ITD-ITD Cementation JV was selected as the lowest bidder for this stretch, with their bid closely aligning with the original cost estimates. Consequently, the contract was successfully awarded to the company, which then commenced construction of the metro station in accordance with the agreements.

The Yellow Line began operations from 10 August 2025 and has been officially inaugurated by Prime Minister Narendra Modi, with four trainsets which are ready for operations after arriving from Titagarh Rail Systems in Kolkata. The opening was delayed from May 2025 as previously announced by the Namma Metro Managing Director, Maheshwar Rao.

== Station layout ==
| G | Street level | Exit/Entrance |
| L1 | Mezzanine | Fare control, station agent, Metro Card vending machines, crossover |
| L2 | Side platform | Doors will open on the left |
| L2 | Platform 2 Southbound | Towards → Delta Electronics Bommasandra; Next Station: Singasandra |
| L2 | Platform 1 Northbound | Towards ← Rashtreeya Vidyalaya Road; Next Station: Hongasandra |
| L2 | Side platform | Doors will open on the left |
| L2 |

== Gallery ==
Here are some of the metro station captures shown below:-

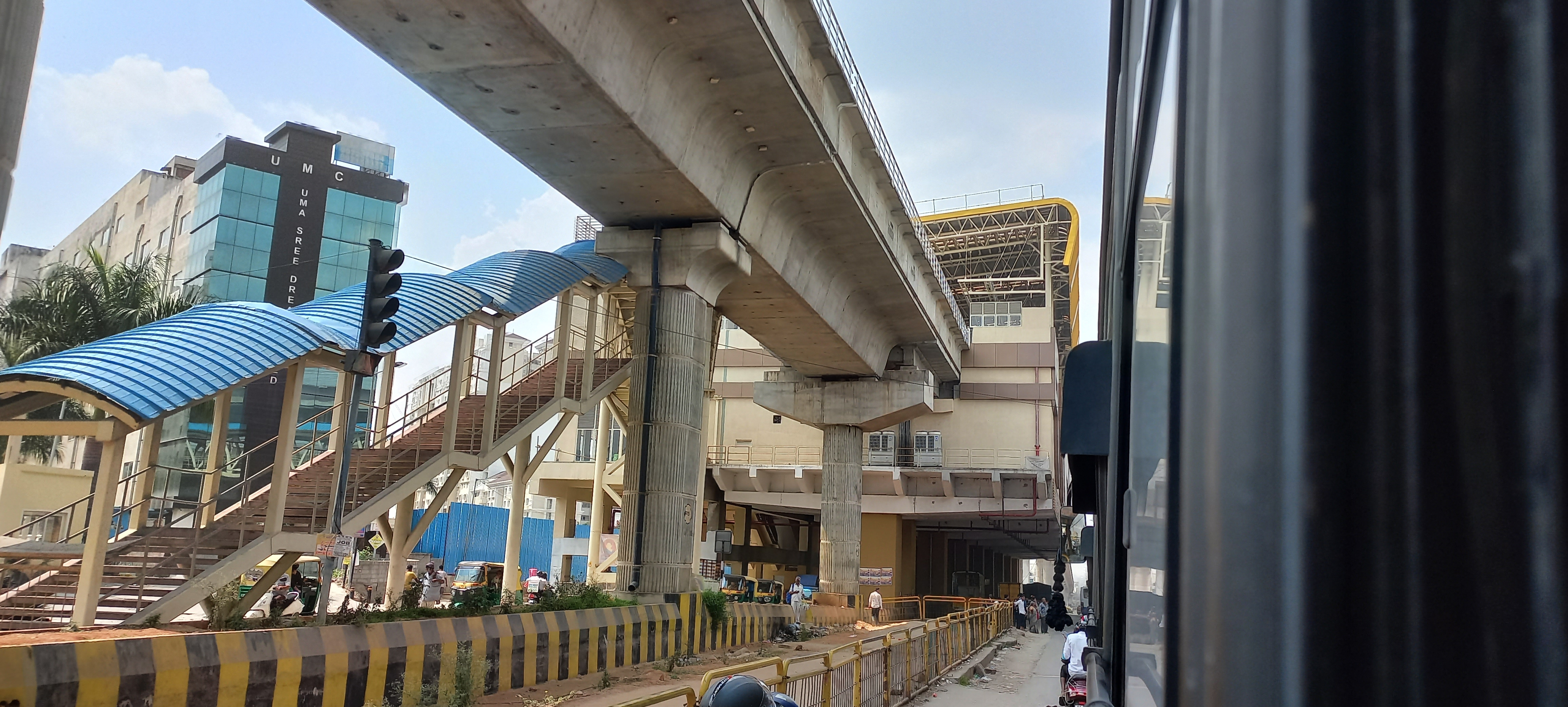
This metro station on U/C as of September 2023

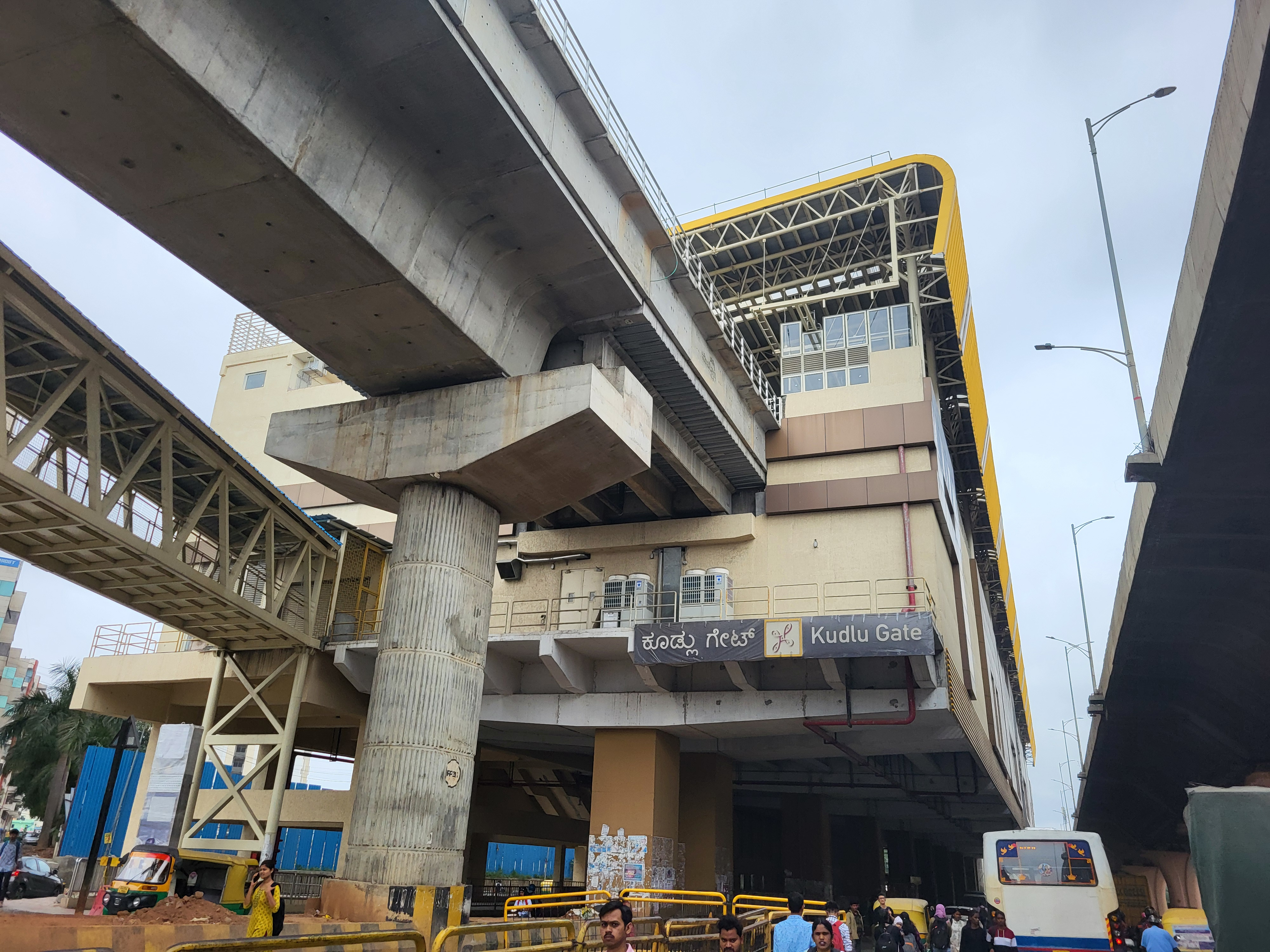
This metro station as of September 2024

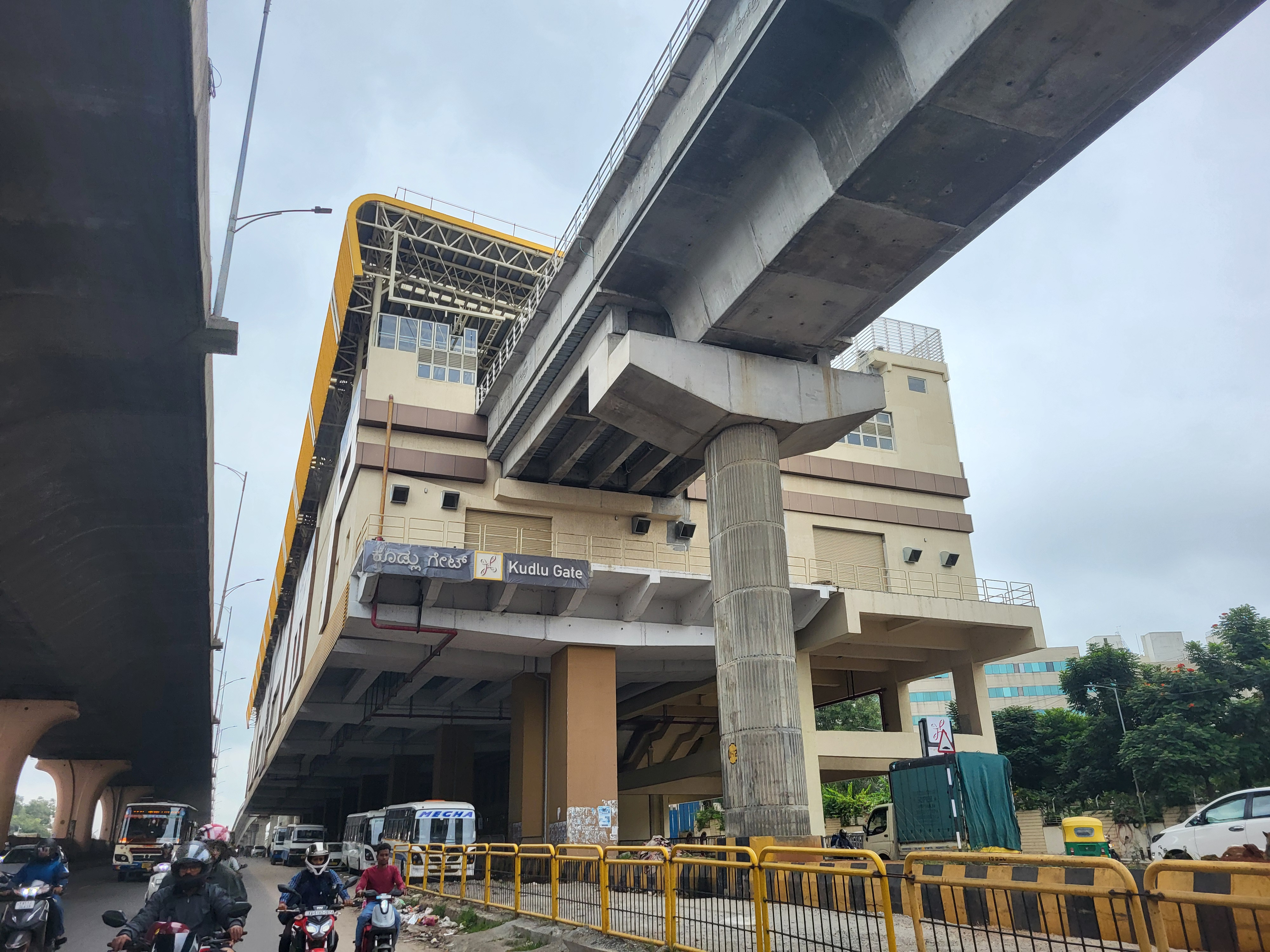
This metro station as of September 2024

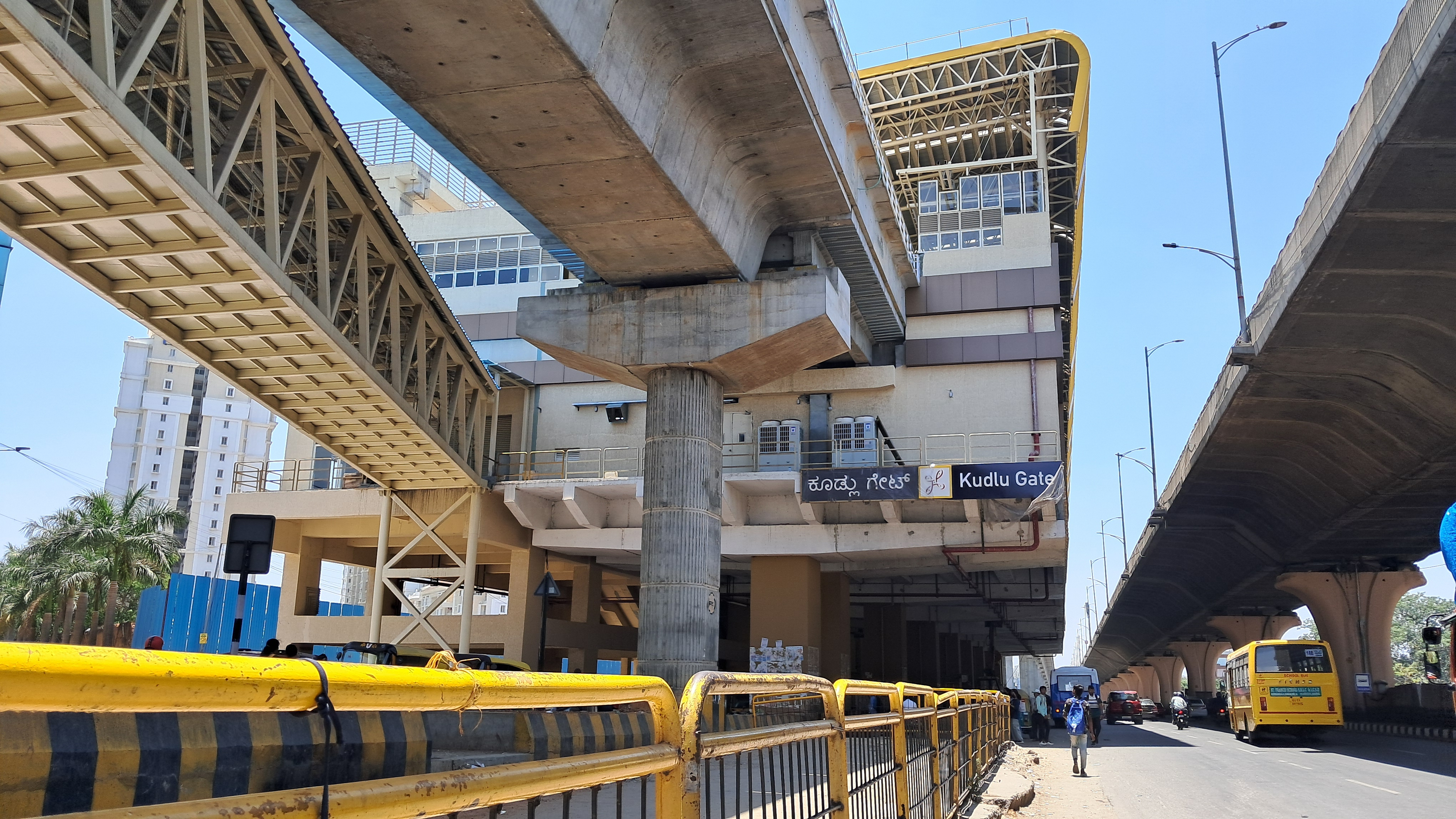
Fully finished road-side view of this metro station as of April 2024

== See also ==
- Bengaluru
- List of Namma Metro stations
- Transport in Karnataka
- List of metro systems
- List of rapid transit systems in India
